= Stankova, Kalush Raion, Ivano-Frankivsk Oblast =

Rural locality in Ivano-Frankivsk Oblast, Ukraine

Stankova Станькова
- Ukraine Ivano-Frankivsk Oblast
- Coordinates: 49°09′10″N 24°18′05″E
- Country: Ukraine
- Oblast: Ivano-Frankivsk Oblast
- District: Kalush Raion

Area
  - Total: 1,735 km^{2} (670 sq mi)
- Elevation: 316 m (1,037 ft)

Population
  - Total: 1,266
  - Density: 0.7297/km^{2} (1.890/sq mi)
- Time zone: UTC+2 (EET)
  - Summer (DST): UTC+3 (EEST)
- Postal code: 77321
- Area code: +380 3472
- Website: село Станькова/райцентр Калуш/облцентр Івано-Франківськ ^{(Ukrainian)}

Stankova (Ukrainian: Станько́ва) is a village in the north of Kalush Raion, Ivano-Frankivsk Oblast, on the border of Stryi Raion, Lviv Oblast. It belongs to Verkhnia rural hromada, one of the hromadas of Ukraine. The population of the village is 1,266 persons and Local government is administered by Stankovaska village council. To the village council Stankova belongs Vylky village.

== Geography ==
This village is located on the altitude of 316 metres (1,040 ft) above sea level, its total area is 17,35 km^{2}.
The village is located away from the central of roads at a distance from the regional center Ivano-Frankivsk 52 kilometres (32 mi), 20 kilometres (12 mi) from the district center Kalush, and 101 kilometres (63 mi) from Lviv.

== History and Attractions ==
The first written mention of the village belongs to 1158.

The village has two churches:
1. Of the Archangel Michael Church (built in 1994).
2. Church of the Nativity. The wooden church, an architectural monument of local importance (built in 1866).
