= Olha Duchyminska =

Ukrainian writer and activist (1883–1988)

- Ольга Дучимінська
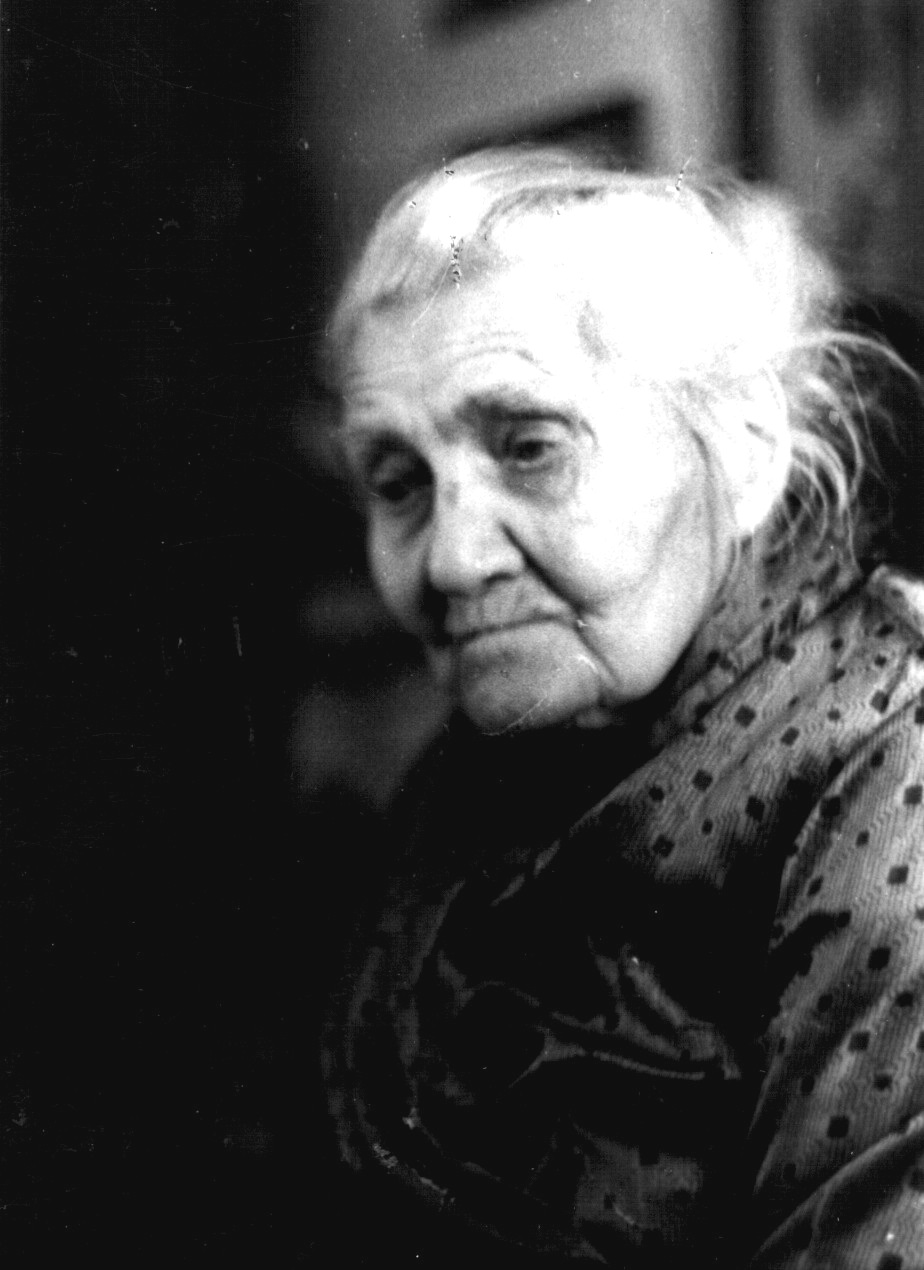
- An image of Duchyminska
- Born: 8 June 1883; Mykolaiv, Kingdom of Galicia and Lodomeria, Austria-Hungary
- Died: 24 September 1988 (aged 105); Ivano-Frankivsk, Ukrainian SSR, Soviet Union
- Resting place: Chukalivka, Ukraine
- Occupations: Writer, feminist, political activist

Olha-Oleksandra Vasylivna Duchyminska (Ukrainian: Ольга-Олександра Василівна Дучимінська; 8 June 1883 – 24 September 1988) was a Ukrainian writer, feminist, and political activist. She is best known for her 1911 poetry work A Bunch of Forget-Me-Nots and her 1945 novel Eti, which addressed the Holocaust. A prominent figure in the Ukrainian women's movement, she co-founded the "Women's Library" in 1912 and organized literacy courses for women in Galicia. She was also a member of the Organisation of Ukrainian Nationalists (OUN), serving as a delegate during the short-lived West Ukrainian People's Republic.

After working as a schoolteacher in small hamlets around Lviv, Duchyminska started working on literary works beginning in 1905. A close friend, Ivan Franko published some of her earlier works in newspapers and bulletins. Eventually, in 1911, she published a book of 15 poems called A Bunch of Forget-Me-Nots, which was widely celebrated for its address of feminine discourse and humanism. Her only other prominent work she published during her lifetime was the novella Eti, which addressed the Holocaust in Lviv with a distinctly anti-war theme. In addition to her literary works, she was a prominent feminist advocate, as she worked with other feminists to promote women's literature in Ukraine. However, in 1949, she was arrested in connection with the murder of Communist writer Yaroslav Halan, and later sentenced to the gulags, where she spent 9 years until being released in 1958 after Joseph Stalin's death. Following her imprisonment, and unable to return home, she moved around Western Ukraine until settling with a cousin of militant leader Stepan Bandera, dying in 1988 in Ivano-Frankivsk.

== Early life ==
Duchyminska was born on 8 June 1883 in the village of Mykolaiv, which was then part of the Kingdom of Galicia and Lodomeria in Austria-Hungary (now Ukraine). She was the daughter of a school director, Vasyl Reshetylovych, and Bronislava Lytvyn who was Polish and the sister of one of Vasyl's gymnasium classmates in Sumy. Her great-grandfather from her family's side came from the village of Reshetylivka, and her grandfather settled in Galicia after marrying into the Bachynsky family of priests. Shortly after Olha's birth, her sisters who were born a little bit after Olha, Severyna and Yarorslava, died of dysentery. In 1887, Vasyl was transferred to work as a teacher in the village of Lopushna in Bibrka. In 1888, her younger sister Mira was born, who managed to survive into adulthood. In 1892, the family relocated to Khorobriv (now in Sokal urban hromada) for Vasyl's work, and again in 1894 to Kunyn (now in Dobrosyn-Maheriv settlement hromada). After initially being homeschooled, she attended a girls' special school starting in fifth grade in Stanyslaviv (now Ivano-Frankivsk), but she stopped in 1897 when her father died and she became an orphan.

After her father's death, thanks to her maternal uncle Yosyp‑Marian Lytvyn who worked as a catechist in Stanyslaviv, she was able to be placed in the Basillian Sisters' school in Yavoriv where she completed up to eighth grade. In 1899, she began to attend the Teacher's Seminary in Przemyśl, where she graduated from in 1902.

== Career ==
=== Teaching ===
After graduating, she was assigned to work as the village schoolteacher in the hamlet of Zalozy (now in Zhovkva urban hromada), where she worked at from 1 September 1902 to 30 August 1903. She was then transferred a multitude of times within short spans from 1903 to 1906, working in Butyny (now in Sheptytskyi Raion), Lysovychi, and Zaderevach (now in Morshyn urban hromada). However, she was hit by personal tragedy during this time, when she gave birth to two sons who died at a very young age. She then moved with her husband to Tiapche (now in Dolyna urban hromada), where she permanently settled from 1906 to 1919, serving from 1915 to 1916 as the head superintendent of St. Olha's bursary. She finally took her last teaching position at Tsenyava (now in Piadyky rural hromada) in 1919, where she worked at until 1925.

=== Literary works ===
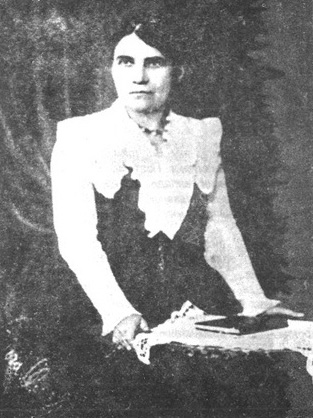
Duchyminska when she was young.

Early on in her literary career she met Ivan Franko, who attempted to get her literary work known by publishing in 1905 Duchyminska's poem in "Swan Song" founded in the daily newspaper Dilo under the pseudonym "Irma Ostapivna", which she called a reworking of Bohdan Lepky's verse. He then published her work "Irony of Fate!" in 1906 in the Literary-Scientific Bulletin (a work of the Shevchenko Scientific Society), and later reprinted in the declamation anthology Rozvaha in 1908, which depicted marriage as chains in a feminist critique of domestic life. She also worked on two poems, Z vesnoiu, wherein she called for sisters and brothers to work, and Narodyny syna about the birth of a child although neither was published.

A few years later, in 1911, she published her first and only poetry collection during her lifetime, a book of 15 poems titled A Bunch of Forget-Me-Nots, again under the pseudonym "Irma Ostapivna" in the student society Sich within Chernivtsi. It was compiled by Mykola Venhzhyn, who also did the preface of the book, and prominently featured personal tragedy after the loss of her children. The proceeds from the sale of the books were sent to the school she was working at. Most of her writing sought to reveal the essence of a person through feelings and sensations, and although she emphasized tragedy she also prominently featured humanism and love for life to remain truly human. Women were portrayed as the heart of history in the stories, like Mary Magdalene and Ukraine itself as part of a distinct feminine discourse. Stylistically, it prominently used fragmentation and ellipses to convey emotion, highlighting the female voice as a bearer of history and suffering. It linked spring to symbolizing renewal and consolation, and autumn as a sadness that paradoxically blooms in defiance, winter as cold and old age yet also protective and beautiful. Thus, she absorbed elements of modernism and neo-romanticism, and her writing often juxtaposed opposing moods while ultimately affirming beauty, which many critics described as original and unique. The book received favorable reviews from critics, especially from author Ivan Nechuy-Levytsky who praised the lyrical song poem When the Sun Was Setting, alongside Nataliya Kobrynska who was a close friend of hers, as Duchyminska dedicated her artistic works to her. However, when folklorist Hanna Barvinok died, Duchyminska decided to change her pseudonym and adopted the name Oleg Barvinok, Oleg meaning "Holy" and Barvinok coming from Hanna.

In addition to her poetry collection, she began her translation of Czech feminist writer Karolina Světlá's book "From Our Battles and Struggles", although this received some criticism from an anonymous critic in Dilo and Mykola Yevshan, although this was not directed at the technique of translation but rather the content of the book. After this, her poems appeared only occasionally. Her next work to be published was in the journal Shliakhy, edition no. 6, called Once a Storm Passed Through My Life, which consisted of only two stanzas and reads like a memory. Throughout 1910 to 1920, she also wrote anti-war novellas regarding World War I called "Warum?" and "Dzvony". It was not until 1928 when her poem Our Sung was published in the women's almanac Zhinocha dolia, which was dedicated to social activist Olena Kysilevska, and was the first time her dropped her pseudonym for her real surname. This poem was specifically dedicated to her views on women at the time, stating women became a free people among humanity as was their destiny. She became increasingly popular in the period of the 1920s-1930s for her literary works after they gained traction in periodicals over the pride of Ukrainian literature, and she was featured on the weekly Nash Svit.

In 1945, she published her last big work, a novella called "Eti", the only of her works to be published during the Soviet period. It tells the story of a Jewish woman, Eti, who hid from the Nazis and touches on the tragedy of the Jewish population in Lviv during the Holocaust. With this, she became the first Ukrainian writer to directly address the Holocaust, although she never returned to the theme after. Eti was anti-war and humanitarian, calling for compassion across races and nations, but apolitical. She failed to gain traction for Eti, with Soviet literary critic Mykhailo Parkhomenko harshly criticizing the work for lacking "true Soviet heroes" like partisans and commissars, considering Eti an "anti-hero". After this, she would not return to poetry until much later during her imprisonment, and most of her works were only published after her death.

=== Social activism ===
Together with Nataliya Kobrynska and Konstantyna Malytska, in 1912 she launched the issue of the "Women's Library", in order to promote women's literature around the world. She also started to organize courses in Galicia to teach women to read and write. By 1925, she organized a local chapter of Prosvita, aimed at promoting literature and national consciousness, and also the following year organized the cooperative "Peasant Union" in rural Galicia to help with women's education. Later, in 1930, she became the Head of the Department of Criticism and Reviews of the Kolomyia magazine "Women's Destiny". She did this until 1939. After 1939, she became an organizer of the Museum of Ethnography and Arts and Crafts in Lviv, working as a guide and librarian to research the ethnographic activities of Ukrainians. She also went to Czechoslovakia during this time, where she delivered lectures on the women's movement in Ukraine.

Duchyminska also became a political activist for the nationalist Organisation of Ukrainian Nationalists (OUN) during the time of the brief West Ukrainian People's Republic She served as a delegate on school and agricultural matters from Dolyna.

== Imprisonment ==
On 23 November 1949, Duchyminska was arrested by Soviet authorities in connection to her alleged involvement in the assassination of prominent Communist writer Yaroslav Halan. During her initial arrest conducted by Lieutenant Surovtsev, her apartment was looted for "bourgeois excesses" and all of her manuscripts were confiscated. While the investigation lasted for the next two years, she was kept in prison in a solitary cell. During her imprisonment, she alleged she was interrogated, tortured, and abused. Finally, on 25-26 May 1951, she was sentenced by a Military Tribunal under the Criminal Code of the Ukrainian USSR, under Articles 54-1a and 54-11, to 25 years of imprisonment in a gulag. During her time in the gulags, she was physically abused and prohibited from corresponding. Due to this, she resorted to writing, compiling an autobiographical poem called "Bohemia", which recalled her life in Lviv, which scholar Pakhomov called an expose to the erosion of solidarity among humanity. She was ambivalent to her "bohemian" circle, despite many having wronged her like Iryna Vilde who refused to sign a petition for her release, and Volodymyr Belyaev who called her a "bourgeois nationalist" and an accomplice in Halan's murder.

On 19 June 1956, after Joseph Stalin's death, her case was agreed to be reviewed again. During the appeal, Article 54-11 was removed, and Article 54-1s of the Criminal Code was reclassified as Article 80-1, thus reducing her sentence to 10 years imprisonment. However, she was released early on 19 December 1958, when she was 75 years old.

== Post-imprisonment ==
After her release, she was not allowed to return to her home, and so she instead sought shelter in Lviv with her longtime younger friend and also writer Iryna Vilde. However, she soon after left to Sambir due to Soviet residency restrictions, although she only registered there to collect her pensions and lived somewhere else during this time. During some time after Sambir, she was deported and moved to Irkutsk Oblast in Russia, where she worked in storage facilities and reconnected with fellow writers who were political prisoners.

Eventually, after being allowed to return to Ukraine, she resettled in Chernivtsi. In the city, she settled with the family of a friend, Olha Kobylianska, who were named the Panchuks. There she became good friends with Halyna Panchuk, and so she stayed with the family for awhile. In 1973, she finally relocated to live with Myroslava Antonovych, a cousin of militant leader Stepan Bandera, who she lived with for the last 15 years of her life.

== Personal life ==
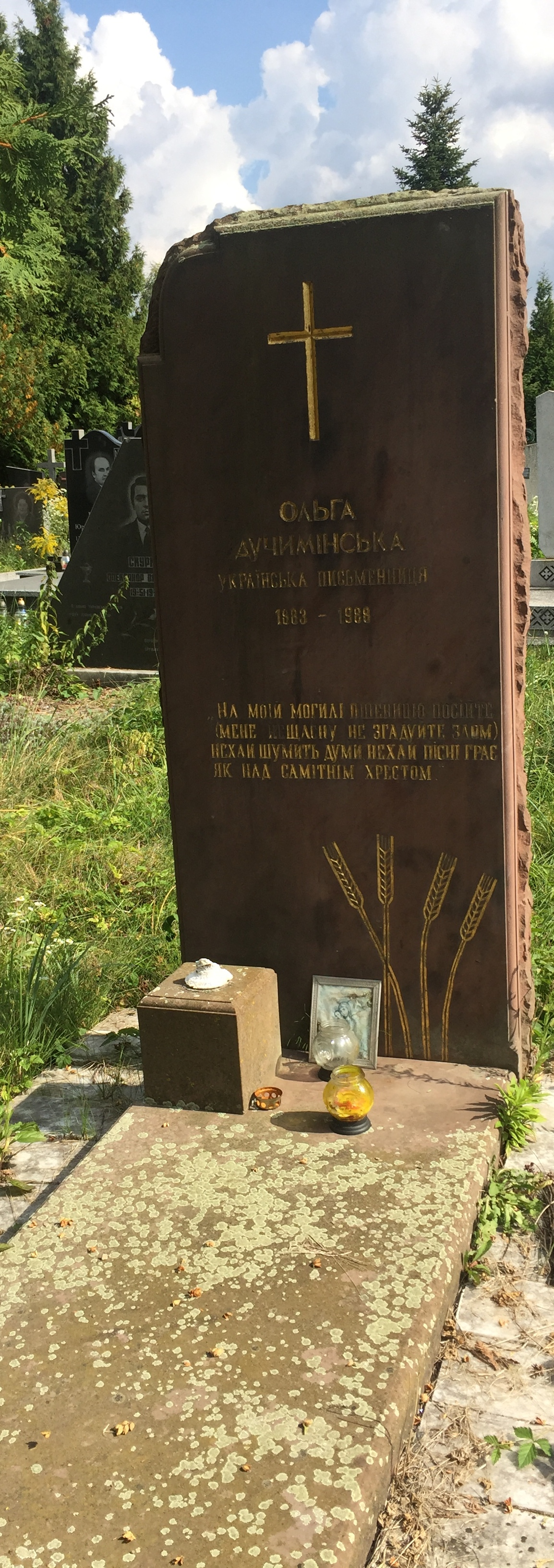
Duchyminska's grave in a cemetery in Chukalivka (near Ivano-Frankivsk)

In 1905, she married Petro Duchyminsky. Petro was also a teacher, but in Zhovkva, but soon after their marriage he and Olha moved to Tiapche in accordance with decision No. 24009 of the Imperial Russian government. In 1908, she had her first daughter named Oksana‑Lidiia‑Myroslava. In 1914, her husband was drafted into the Russian army as part of the campaign of the Ukrainian Sich Riflemen, but after the formation of the Ukrainian People's Army he joined the new Sich Riflemen. He later served in the Battle of Kyiv as part of the UPR forces, but upon the Bolshevik victory in the battle, he was captured and interned in Czechoslovakia where he stayed at.

In 1945, her only daughter Oksana decided to leave Ukraine for Czechoslovakia, mostly likely to live with her father Petro. Eventually, Oksana moved to Munich. During this time, Olha extensively visited and supported her daughter. Her daughter eventually died on 4 December 1972, leaving Olha depressed at the realization of her solitude.

Olha died over a decade later on 24 September 1988 in Ivano-Frankivsk while living with Bandera's cousin. She was buried by the community in the cemetery at Chukalivka (a small village on the outskirts of Ivano-Frankivsk). A wooden cross was placed on her grave by her request, and the community also hung a crown of thorns on the cross.

== Honours ==
In the village where she formally taught, Tiapche, the main primary parish school for the village was dedicated in her honour when they renamed it to her name. She has also had a street named after in Lviv, which connects Kuznyarivka with the intersection of Almazna and Ozernaya streets. It was named after her in 1993. In September 2023, a memorial plaque was dedicated to her in Ivano-Frankivsk, which was created on the initiative of the Union of Ukrainian Women.

She was also the prototype for the character of Lviv-based writer Olena Haidukevich in the 1973 film "Until the Last Minute" by Valery Isakov. Vilde and Olha's relationship was later depicted in the Maria Zankovetska Theatre's play "St. Nicholas Evening" by Roman Horak.
