= Sydor Rey =

Polish poet and novelist (1908–1979)

- Born: Izydor Reiss; 6 September 1908; Wojniłów
- Died: 15 November 1979 (aged 71)
- Occupations: Poet, writer, orphanage worker
- Children: one daughter
- Writing career
- Period: Interbellum; Second World War; Post-War period
- Genre: Lyric poetry

Sydor Rey born Izydor Reiss (6 September 1908 – 15 November 1979) was a Polish poet and novelist. During the Interbellum he worked in the Jewish orphanage of Janusz Korczak in Warsaw. He dedicated his short story Anioł-Stróż ("Guardian Angel"; 1957), part of his book Księga rozbitków, to the memory of Janusz Korczak. A bisexual author, Sydor Rey did not frequently tackle gay subjects in his writings.

== Life in interwar Poland ==
Sydor Rey was born in Wojniłów (now Voinyliv, Ukraine). He studied law and political science at the Lvov University and at Warsaw University. As a writer, Rey debuted in 1929. He was a member of the literary collective (zespół literacki) Przedmieście in Warsaw. The first issue of the group's literary journal indicated that the association was established on the initiative of Helena Boguszewska (1886–1978) and Jerzy Kornacki (1908–1981) in June–July 1933, with Bruno Schulz, Adolf Rudnicki, and Zofia Nałkowska among the invited founder members. Rudnicki had resigned from membership before the publication of their magazine in 1934, while Halina Krahelska and Sydor Rey were inducted as new members.

The group's name (przedmieście, Pol. "faubourg") has been explained as referring both to the group's programmatic preoccupation with the marginalized aspects of the culture and social life in the Second Polish Republic, and to the connotation of "outpost" – hence by extension avant-garde. The volume carried Sydor Rey's short story Królestwo Boże ("The Kingdom of God"), a fictional narrative of a visit to a privately owned factory by a friend of the proprietors. The visit becomes an occasion for remarkably detailed observations on the work conditions of the employees and their relations with the management, the government (represented by an industrial inspector), and the outside world.

=== First novel Kropiwniki ===
Sydor Rey's first novel Kropiwniki was published in 1937. The title of the novel, Kropiwniki, refers to the Polish provincial locality of Kropiwniki in the Volhynia (96 kilometres to the north of the Polish town of Włodzimierz Wołyński; since 1945 within the territory of the Ukrainian SSR), whose name the author uses as a cryptonym for his native Wojniłów, an ancient township founded in 1552 by the charter issued by Sigismund II Augustus. Its real identity thus concealed, the place serves as a canvas on which the author paints the history of three generations of inhabitants from various social classes and religious communities of Polish society, including Poles, Jews, and Ukrainians, representatives of the szlachta but also peasants, merchants, and artisans, thereby presenting an allegory on Polish society as a whole. Each of these various social groups, further subdivided in the book into additional subgroups and subtypes, espouses different and often conflicting sets of beliefs concerning social and political matters, whose beliefs moreover further mutate from generation to generation. While the author parades a plethora of various types of characters on his stage, from the szlachta individuals affecting a grand aristocratic manner, through lordlings enlightened by foreign studies enough to be able to fraternize with the working classes, to well-to-do Jewish businessmen, he devotes most space to the radicalizing poverty of the township and the impenetrable ignorance of the peasant masses of the surrounding villages, succeeding to depict this broad gallery of human types in particularly vivid brush strokes of great directness. Owing however to the well-nigh unmanageable breadth of the scope of his project, it has been observed by contemporary critics that the social doctrine on occasion takes precedence in his writing over art. The author Jerzy Andrzejewski (1909–1983) in literary magazine Prosto z mostu, was even less kind, having seen in Kropiwniki an expression of the alleged Communist stance of an author squandering his talent in a doctrinaire enterprise of quixotic futility. Witold Gombrowicz too wrote a detailed and perhaps most considerate analysis of Kropiwniki, arguing that it is the literary debuts that are more interesting, for all their inchoate form, than an author's later works which, though benefiting from the writer's more crystallized pattern of thought, in general tend to say little that is essentially new.

Rey also translated from the Yiddish into Polish the biographical novel on Karl Marx, Karl Marks (bay zayn shvel): byografisher montazsh-roman by the Polish writer Moisheh Grosman (1904–1961).

A pewnie że poznam drzewo,
Ale drzewo czy mnie pozna?
Tak jak ja się zmieniłem,
Nie zmienia się lipa przydrożna.

________________

Surely I will recognize the tree,
But the tree, will it recognize me?
As much change as I took astride
No poplar could manage by the roadside.

— "List" (A Letter)
December 1957

Biographer Eugenia Prokop-Janiec of Jagiellonian University asserts that it was ultimately the pervasive antisemitism of the Polish society in the 1930s that forced the writers and poets like Sydor Rey and Henryka Łazowertówna (1909–1942), who never otherwise identified themselves as Jewish while working in the Polish language, to align themselves with the Jewish community for the first time. Sydor Rey's vignette entitled Spacer ("A Walk") deals with the thorny subject of race relations in a homoerotic context. It is a short text about a male couple who, taking a stroll in a public park, attract the attention of a gathering crowd not for being gay but for being of different races: the bystanders are not hostile to both characters as a couple, but in each case only to one of them – selected according to the particular bystander's own racial allegiance: the Gentiles in the crowd of onlookers are hostile to the man who looks Jewish, for they believe him to be somehow exploitative of his companion; the Jews in the crowd on the other hand are hostile to the Gentile believing him to be about to cause harm to his Jewish companion to whom they consequently feel obliged to offer assistance. Both men offer explanations to a policeman who arrives on the scene to institute ad hoc inquiry of his own into the commingling of the couple. The story is an allegory on the impossibility of normal relations between the races on a private level without public or official harassment, even as relations between (or within) the sexes are tolerated. A bisexual author, Sydor Rey did not frequently tackle gay subjects in his writings. His epigram "Na plaży" (On the Beach) is one of the exceptions.

Rey was one of the signatories of the open letter of the Polish writers against the bloody pacification by the Polish police of the workers' protests against the Sanacja régime in March 1936.

== Emigration ==
On the eve of the Second World War, in the spring of 1939 Sydor Rey emigrated from Warsaw to New York City, where he subsequently operated a second-hand bookshop. His wife and daughter left behind in Poland perished in Kraków during the Holocaust. During his American period his writings appeared frequently in the Polish-language weekly newspaper Wiadomości: tygodnik ("The News: A Weekly") published in London, and in other émigré periodicals (while Commentary and the Transatlantic Review published translations in the United States). In his reply to a survey of Polish writers living in exile conducted by the Wiadomości of London in 1958, nearly twenty years after his departure from Poland, Rey revealed that every writer creatively active in exile is spiritually present, in the act of creation, in his native land. Hence there are in reality no "émigré writers" and no "émigré literatures". He appended his literary testament with the following codicil.

If I, after well-nigh twenty years spent in the United States, have never thought for a moment of adopting English as my creative medium, it is because spiritually I continue to reside in my Homeland. The split involved here at times invests the written word of an author in exile with a terrifying beauty, which flows from his undaunted vision. But at the same time this split can, in the long run, lead to the degeneration of the creative faculty — the most glaring case in point being that of the giant of Polish literature, Adam Mickiewicz. (...) [This happens] when a writer ceases to use the written word in the service of Beauty, as a building block in the project of constructing his own immaterial world, and starts using it as a magic charm invoked for the sake of transforming his immaterial world into a material one.

And Rey clearly remained devoted to the Polish language for life, in the sort of intricate way of an impeccable stylist, as evidenced in his corrections of the minutiae in the prose of other writers or in the praise he generously showered on the dextrous use of the language in other cases, even of those who might not have been professional writers. He was listed by the Wiadomości of London among the Polish writers in exile who ought to be members of the Polish Academy of Literature were such an institution to be established (or rather revived). There is no evidence, on the other hand, that in the United States Rey found anything like a substitute for the land of his youth; in a poem entitled "Miasto na Long Island" (A City on Long Island) published in 1960 he speaks of a "city flat and straight like a cadaver", with street names invoking "Indians that have been exterminated, running streams that have been filled in, hills that have been levelled down, and forests that have been felled": what use to me this cemetery? he asks. "Don't you know that I was born in a land where a white-winged horse would bend down to peer into my crib?" In the poem "Banita" (The Banished One; 1961) Rey speaks of himself as a person deprived of speech, on account of his being "a poet without a land".

== Publishing from abroad ==
During his exile in the United States he also chose to publish his books — Księga rozbitków ("The Book of the Shipwrecked"; first edition, 1959) and Kropiwniki (second edition, 1962) — in the then Communist-controlled Poland, where their publication would have been subject to (and has received) the advance approval of the censors. He also granted an interview to the Polish Radio in 1963, apparently on a visit to Warsaw (see Recordings).

Księga rozbitków ("The Book of the Shipwrecked") is a collection of eighteen short stories that are, cumulatively, a psychological memoir of an author guilt-stricken for having passed the Holocaust in the physical safety of New York while being spiritually connected to the event as closely as or perhaps in some cases more closely than some of the victims, making the work something of a cross between a novel and a psychodrama cum a Gestalt therapy.

Sydor Rey's novel Ludzie miejscowi ("The Folk of the Place") was published in installments in the Wiadomości of London between 1962 and 1966 (see Works). While his writings in prose were praised for their astute psychological shadowing of characters and deep insights into the human condition, his poetry did not appeal to everyone. Marian Pankowski, reviewing his collection of poetry Własnymi słowami ("In My Own Words"; 1967), refused to apply the label of "poetry" to his verses, arguing that the colloquial and sometimes crude turn of phrase favoured by the author put his epigrams beyond the pale of art, while the consistent unsublimated directness of expression made it impossible to interpret this style as a literary conceit. Rey countered that the criticisms presented by Pankowski were illustrated by tendentiously selected quotations that did not constitute a representative sample and had been taken out of context, and that the overall method of extrapolating judgement of the whole oeuvre from bits and pieces was absurd, "rather like presenting an audience with the bottom sliver of Cézanne's Bathing Women — the figures cut off at the ankle — and averring this fragment to possess 'some characteristics of Cézanne's painting style', only to dispatch the artist in toto with the dictum that 'the rest of his output is much in the same manner'". Since Rey did not publish essays, his philosophical ideas found expression in his fiction, both in prose and in verse. Poems that deal directly or (sometimes) veiledly with the principal tenets of the Judaeo-Christian religious doctrine — such as "Bajka" (Fairy Tale), "Ojcze nasz" (Our Father), or "Raz kozie śmierć" (Once a Death Befell a Goat) which quotes (in Hebrew) one of the Seven Last Words in the scornful context of a pastoral ditty — may offend religious sensibilities, expressive as they are of his deep agnosticism and his radical questioning of the truth value of that doctrine.

As a literary critic, Sydor Rey believed that Boris Pasternak's novel Doctor Zhivago was deeply indebted to Hemingway's A Farewell to Arms, notwithstanding the fact of Hemingway's having been "thick-skinned and effect-driven" as opposed to Pasternak's qualities of fragile intelligence and delicacy. He was an admirer of the works of Thornton Wilder, to whom he dedicated a poem (entitled "Festyn" — "A Village Fair"; translated in The Daily Orange in 1966 as "Picnic"), acknowledging his indebtedness in the writing of Księga rozbitków to the style of Wilder's play Our Town.

His collected papers dating from the period between 1940 and 1969 — The Sydor Rey Papers — are preserved in the Special Collections Research Center of the Syracuse University Library in Syracuse, New York, having been donated to the institution by the Author in 1966. Some of his correspondence with Salo Wittmayer Baron is also preserved among the papers of the latter — The Salo W. Baron Papers, 1900–1980 — in the Department of Special Collections of Stanford University Libraries, while his correspondence with the renowned critic Michał Chmielowiec (1918–1974) is kept among the papers of the latter in the Archiwum Emigracji of the Nicolaus Copernicus University Library in Toruń.

== Works ==
=== Poetry monographs ===
- Pieśni mówione ("Spoken Songs"; 1945)
- Własnymi słowami ("In My Own Words"; 1967)

=== Selected poetry in periodicals ===
- "***" (untitled poem beginning with the words "Jak każdy, z prochu powstał…" (As all that from the ashes have risen…); Wiadomości: tygodnik (London), vol. 12, No. [24] (585), 16 June 1957, p. 1)
- "List" ("A Letter"; Wiadomości: tygodnik (London), vol. 12, No. 51/52 (612/613), 22–29 December 1957, p. 1; subsequently published in Własnymi słowami)
- "Cisza" ("Silence"; Wiadomości: tygodnik (London), vol. 13, No. 29/30 (642/643), 20–27 July 1958, p. 1)
- "Smutek" ("Sadness"; Wiadomości: tygodnik (London), vol. 13, No. 51/52 (664/665), 21–28 December 1958, p. 5; subsequently published in Własnymi słowami)
- "Najcichszy krok" ("The Quietest Step"; Wiadomości: tygodnik (London), vol. 14, No. 42 (707), 18 October 1959, p. 1)
- "Niebo jest moim domem" ("Heaven is My Home"; Wiadomości: tygodnik (London), vol. 15, No. 9 (726), 28 February 1960, p. 1)
- "Na pustyni" ("In the Wilderness"; Wiadomości: tygodnik (London), vol. 15, No. 17 (734), 24 April 1960, p. 1; subsequently published in Własnymi słowami)
- "Miasto na Long Island" ("A City on Long Island"; Wiadomości: tygodnik (London), vol. 15, No. 23 (740), 5 June 1960, p. 1; subsequently published in Własnymi słowami)
- "Bajka" ("Fairy Tale"; Wiadomości: tygodnik (London), vol. 15, No. 51/52 (768/769), 18–25 December 1960, p. 4; a critique of the basic soteriological tenet of the Christian doctrine)
- "Dobrzy sąsiedzi" ("Good Neighbours"; Wiadomości: tygodnik (London), vol. 16, No. 5 (774), 29 January 1961, p. 5; a humorous quatrain dedicated to Konstanty Ildefons Gałczyński, who is compared in the dedication, and in the poem itself, to Dylan Thomas, his good drinking companion and "neighbour in the [same] coffin"; subsequently published in Własnymi słowami)
- "Poezja nierymowana" ("Blank Verse"; Wiadomości: tygodnik (London), vol. 16, No. 21 (790), 21 May 1961, p. 5; a fraszka or bagatelle, epigram: see fraszka)
- "Kłamca" ("The Liar"; Wiadomości: tygodnik (London), vol. 16, No. 21 (790), 21 May 1961, p. 5; a fraszka or bagatelle, epigram: see fraszka)
- "Ojcze nasz" ("Our Father"; Wiadomości: tygodnik (London), vol. 16, No. 52/53 (821/822), 24–31 December 1961, p. 3; a critique of the basic soteriological tenet of the Christian doctrine; subsequently published in Własnymi słowami)
- "Wioska po wojnie" ("A Village after the War"; Wiadomości: tygodnik (London), vol. 16, No. 52/53 (821/822), 24–31 December 1961, p. 3; on the native village)
- "Banita" ("The Banished One"; Wiadomości: tygodnik (London), vol. 16, No. 52/53 (821/822), 24–31 December 1961, p. 3; on his own exile as a poet)
- "Festyn" ("A Village Fair"; Wiadomości: tygodnik (London), vol. 18, No. 37 (911), 15 September 1963, p. 1; dedicated to Thornton Wilder; translated as "Picnic" in The Daily Orange of 15 April 1966)
- "Całopalenie" ("Holocaust"; Wiadomości: tygodnik (London), vol. 19, No. 18 (944), 3 May 1964, p. 1)
- "Mi ato?" ("And What about Me?"; Wiadomości: tygodnik (London), vol. 12, No. 4 (1086), 22 January 1967, p. 6; subsequently published in Własnymi słowami)
- "Kraniec miasta" ("On the Confines of Town"; Wiadomości: tygodnik (London), vol. 12, No. 4 (1086), 22 January 1967, p. 6; subsequently published in Własnymi słowami)
- "Smak słowa i śmierci" ("The Taste of the Word and of Death"; Wiadomości: tygodnik (London), vol. 12, No. 4 (1086), 22 January 1967, p. 6; dedicated to "the memory of Zuzanna Ginczanka"; subsequently published in Własnymi słowami)
- "Raz kozie śmierć" ("Once a Death Befell a Goat"; Wiadomości: tygodnik (London), vol. 12, No. 4 (1086), 22 January 1967, p. 6; a critique of the basic soteriological tenet of the Christian doctrine, quoting the Hebrew words of "My God, my God, why have you forsaken me"; subsequently published in Własnymi słowami)
- "Bestia" ("The Beast"; Wiadomości: tygodnik (London), vol. 12, No. 4 (1086), 22 January 1967, p. 6; subsequently published in Własnymi słowami)
- "Egzystencjalizm" ("Existentialism"; Wiadomości: tygodnik (London), vol. 12, No. 4 (1086), 22 January 1967, p. 6; subsequently published in Własnymi słowami)
- "Śpiew ptaków" ("Birdsong"; Wiadomości: tygodnik (London), vol. 27, No. 12 (1355), 19 March 1972, p. 1)
- "W naszym ogródku" ("In Our Little Garden"; Wiadomości: tygodnik (London), vol. 27, No. 12 (1355), 19 March 1972, p. 1)
- "Na wystawie Picassa" ("At a Picasso Exhibition"; Wiadomości: tygodnik (London), vol. 28, No. 18 (1414), 6 May 1973, p. 6; a critique, in verse, of Cubism)
- "Obieżyświat" ("The Globetrotter"; Wiadomości: tygodnik (London), vol. 31, No. 2 (1554), 11 January 1976, p. 3; an autobiographical reflection in verse)
- "Vincent i Theo" ("Vincent and Theo"; Wiadomości: tygodnik (London), vol. 31, No. 2 (1554), 11 January 1976, p. 3; dedicated "to the memory of Cyprian Norwid")
- "Wrocław–Lwów" ("Wrocław–Lvov"; Wiadomości: tygodnik (London), vol. 31, No. 21 (1573), 23 May 1976, p. 6; dedicated "to the memory of Józef Wittlin")

=== Novels ===
- Kropiwniki ("Kropiwniki"; 1937)
- Księga rozbitków ("The Book of the Shipwrecked", also referred to as "The Book of Survivors", and "The Book of the Wrecked"; 1959)
- Ludzie miejscowi ("The Folk of the Place"; see below)

==== Księga rozbitków installments ====
- Anioł-Stróż ("Guardian Angel"; Wiadomości: tygodnik (London), vol. 12, No. 40 (601), 6 October 1957, p. 1; Guardian Angel: A Story, tr. N. Guterman, Commentary, vol. 67, No. 2, February 1979, p. 58: see online)
- Mój mit ("My Myth"; Wiadomości: tygodnik (London), vol. 13, No. 7 (620), 16 February 1958, p. 3)
- Nekrofilia ("Necrophilia"; Wiadomości: tygodnik (London), vol. 13, No. 17 (630), 27 April 1958, p. 4)
- Felicja ("Felicia"; Wiadomości: tygodnik (London), vol. 13, No. 28 (641), 13 July 1958, p. 3)
- Portret bez twarzy ("Portrait without a Face"; Wiadomości: tygodnik (London), vol. 13, No. 44 (657), 2 November 1958, p. 3; tr. N. Guterman, Transatlantic Review, No. 17, Autumn 1964)
- Trzy fragmenty: Handlarz sztuki; Janczar; Bob ("Three Fragments: The Art Dealer; Ludwik Janczar; Bob"; Wiadomości: tygodnik (London), vol. 14, No. 10 (675), 8 March 1959, p. 3)
- Trzy szkice: Maska pośmiertna; Nauczyciel; Lekarz ("Three Sketches: The Death Mask; The Teacher; The Physician"; Wiadomości: tygodnik (London), vol. 14, No. 23 (688), 7 June 1959, p. 3)
- Earth: A Story (tr. N. Guterman, Commentary, vol. 33, No. 3, March 1962, p. 226: see online)

==== Ludzie miejscowi installments ====
- Konfident ("The Stool Pigeon"; Wiadomości: tygodnik (London), vol. 17, No. 12 (834), 25 March 1962, p. 3)
- Krawiec Grzegorz ("The Tailor Named Gregory"; Wiadomości: tygodnik (London), vol. 17, No. 20 (842), 20 May 1962, p. 2)
- Emilia i Antoni ("Emily and Anthony"; Wiadomości: tygodnik (London), vol. 17, No. 34 (856), 26 August 1962, p. 3; a fragment of an unidentified "larger work", but characters recognizably from Ludzie miejscowi)
- Edmund ("Edmund"; Wiadomości: tygodnik (London), vol. 17, No. 49 (871), 9 December 1962, p. 2)
- Ofiara i radość ("The Victim and the Rejoicing"; Wiadomości: tygodnik (London), vol. 18, No. 21 (895), 26 May 1963, p. 3)
- Pearl ("Pearl"; Wiadomości: tygodnik (London), vol. 18, No. 25 (899), 23 June 1963, p. 3; the subject is an American woman during the period of the so-called Second Red Scare)
- Pan własnego życia ("The Master of His Own Life"; Wiadomości: tygodnik (London), vol. 18, No. 30 (904), 28 July 1963, p. 2)
- Dwór ("The Manor House"; Wiadomości: tygodnik (London), vol. 19, No. 4 (930), 26 January 1964, p. 3)
- Śmierć nieuzasadniona ("Unexplained Death"; Wiadomości: tygodnik (London), vol. 19, No. 19 (945), 10 May 1964, p. 3)
- Pan i sługa ("The Master and the Servant"; Wiadomości: tygodnik (London), vol. 19, No. 38 (964), 20 September 1964, p. 2)
- Dysputa ("A Disputation"; Wiadomości: tygodnik (London), vol. 19, No. 42 (968), 18 October 1964, p. 2)
- Przytułek ("A Refuge"; Wiadomości: tygodnik (London), vol. 19, No. 46 (972), 15 November 1964, p. 3)
- Wariacje na temat śmierci ("Variations on the Theme of Death"; Wiadomości: tygodnik (London), vol. 20, No. 23 (1001), 6 June 1965, pp. 2–3)
- Scena miłosna ("A Love Scene"; Wiadomości: tygodnik (London), vol. 20, No. 28 (1006), 11 July 1965, p. 2)
- Bankiet ("Banquet"; Wiadomości: tygodnik (London), vol. 20, No. 34 (1012), 22 August 1965, p. 2)
- Swaty ("Matchmaking"; Wiadomości: tygodnik (London), vol. 20, No. 41 (1019), 10 October 1965, p. 4)
- Lekcja historii ("A Lesson of History"; Wiadomości: tygodnik (London), vol. 21, No. 19 (1049), 8 May 1966, p. 4)

=== Short stories ===
- Spowiedź ("A Confession"; Republika Dzieci (Łódź), No. 23 (58), 3 June 1931, p. 5)
- Królestwo Boże ("The Kingdom of God"; Przedmieście, ed. H. Boguszewska & J. Kornacki, Warsaw, Towarzystwo Wydawnicze Rój, 1934, pp. 158–177)
- Spacer ("A Walk"; Nowy Głos (a daily Jewish newspaper of Warsaw), vol. 2, No. 155, 5 June 1938, p. 7)
- Odzyskane dzieciństwo ("Childhood Regained"; Wiadomości: tygodnik (London), vol. 15, No. 5 (722), 31 January 1960, p. 3; the story of a middle-aged couple who marry, to the derision of their neighbours in the village, gaining some measure of respect only after the death of their first child)
- Generał ("The General"; Wiadomości: tygodnik (London), vol. 15, No. 14 (731), 3 April 1960, p. 2; originally published in an English translation by Irena Morska in Polish Authors of Today and Yesterday: Bartkiewicz, Falkowski, Gojawiczynska, Morska, Muszal, Olechowski, Orzeszko, Prus, Rey, Reymont, Sienkiewicz, Szymanski, Zeromski, comp. I. Morska, New York City, S. F. Vanni, 1947, pp. 85–90)
- Shulim: A Story (Commentary, vol. 29, No. 4, April 1960, p. 324: see online; also published in (Brazilian) Portuguese translation as Pogrom: A História de Schulim in Entre dois mundos, comp. & ed. A. Rosenfeld, et al., São Paulo, Editôra Perspectiva, 1967)
- Ksiądz-technik ("The Technician Priest"; Wiadomości: tygodnik (London), vol. 15, No. 26 (743), 26 June 1960, p. 2)
- Cudotwórca ("The Miracle Worker"; Wiadomości: tygodnik (London), vol. 15, No. 40 (757), 2 October 1960, p. 2)
- Jadłodajnia ("The Canteen"; Wiadomości: tygodnik (London), vol. 15, No. 47 (764), 20 November 1960, p. 3)
- Cisza ("Peace and Quiet"; Wiadomości: tygodnik (London), vol. 16, No. 23 (792), 4 June 1961, p. 3; the story of a lawyer who, in search of respite from his haranguing wife, is directed to a "quiet and secluded" country retreat which, on arrival (after a long journey), he finds instead overflowing with young revellers, only to be physically assaulted by the lone middle-aged resident to whom he incautiously suggests a change of guesthouse — and who turns out to be the owner)
- Hitler's Mother (The Noble Savage magazine, No. 5, [S.l.], Meridian Books [ Cleveland, World Publishing Co.], 1962, p. 161)
- Stella: A Story (tr. N. Guterman, Commentary, vol. 36, No. 6, December 1963, p. 473: see online)
- Iwancio ("Iwancio"; Wiadomości: tygodnik (London), vol. 22, No. 32 (1114), 6 August 1967, p. 3; originally published in an English translation by Samuel Sorgenstein in Polish Authors of Today and Yesterday: Bartkiewicz, Falkowski, Gojawiczynska, Morska, Muszal, Olechowski, Orzeszko, Prus, Rey, Reymont, Sienkiewicz, Szymanski, Zeromski, comp. I. Morska, New York City, S. F. Vanni, 1947, pp. 91–98)

=== Literary criticism ===
- "Pasternak i Hemingway" ("Pasternak and Hemingway"; letter to the editor, Wiadomości: tygodnik (London), vol. 14, No. 9 (674), 1 March 1959, p. 6)
- "Nasz stosunek do twórczości Sienkiewicza: Sydor Rey" ("The Reception of the Work of Sienkiewicz: Sydor Rey"; Wiadomości: tygodnik (London), vol. 16, No. 7 (776), 12 February 1961, p. 5)
- "Pisarki" ("Women Writers"; letter to the editor, Wiadomości: tygodnik (London), vol. 16, No. 18 (787), 30 April 1961, p. 6; on the superiority of writings produced by women)
- "Para Mistrzów" ("Two Masters"; letter to the editor, Wiadomości: tygodnik (London), vol. 16, No. 20 (789), 14 May 1961, p. 6; extolling the merits of two writers, Kazimiera Iłłakowiczówna (1892–1983) and Jan Rostworowski (1919–1975))
- "Balzac i Victor Hugo" ("Balzac and Victor Hugo"; letter to the editor, Wiadomości: tygodnik (London), vol. 16, No. 36 (805), 3 September 1961, p. 4)
- "Barabasz i Judasz" ("Barabbas and Judas"; letter to the editor, Wiadomości: tygodnik (London), vol. 17, No. 3 (825), 21 January 1962, p. 4; on Nikos Kazantzakis's novel The Last Temptation of Christ, and antisemitism)
- "Deser czy danie główne?" ("A Dessert or the Main Dish?"; letter to the editor, Wiadomości: tygodnik (London), vol. 17, No. 14 (836), 8 April 1962, p. 6; on Polish writers marginalized in literary magazines)
- "Polska szkoła poetycka" ("Polish School of Poetry"; letter to the editor, Wiadomości: tygodnik (London), vol. 17, No. 24 (846), 17 June 1962, p. 6; on the poetry of Zofia Bohdanowiczowa, 1898–1965)
- "O sztuce Gombrowicza" ("On the Art of Gombrowicz"; letter to the editor, Wiadomości: tygodnik (London), vol. 18, No. 29 (903), 21 July 1963, p. 4; on the literary craft of Witold Gombrowicz and Stanisław Przybyszewski)
- "Trza" ("Gotta"; letter to the editor, Wiadomości: tygodnik (London), vol. 28, No. 3 (1399), 21 January 1973, p. 6; on the literary craft of Józef Łobodowski, humorously: "one must not say 'gotta'; one gotta say 'ought to'")

==== Letters ====
- "Teatr śmierci" ("The Theatre of Death"; letter to the editor, Wiadomości: tygodnik (London), vol. 31, No. 7 (1559), 15 February 1976, p. 6; on the acquaintance with Michael Atkins of London)
- "Która noga?" ("Which Leg?"; letter to the editor, Wiadomości: tygodnik (London), vol. 33, No. 52/53 (1708/1709), 24–31 December 1978, p. 12; on Witold Gombrowicz's visits to the Ziemiańska café)

== Recordings ==
- The Polish national broadcaster, Polskie Radio, has a 20-minute recording of an interview with Sydor Rey conducted by the actor Aleksander Bardini on 26 March 1963, in which a fragment of Rey's novel Ludzie miejscowi (then a work-in-progress) is read by Bardini.

== Bibliography ==
- Polish Authors of Today and Yesterday: Bartkiewicz, Falkowski, Gojawiczynska, Morska, Muszal, Olechowski, Orzeszko, Prus, Rey, Reymont, Sienkiewicz, Szymanski, Zeromski, comp. I. Morska, New York City, S. F. Vanni, 1947, page xvi.
- Zofia Kozarynowa, "O Księdze rozbitków", Wiadomości: tygodnik (London), vol. 14, No. 48 (713), 29 November 1959, page 4. (A review of Księga rozbitków; illustrated by a rare photograph of Sydor Rey.)
- Gerald Popiel, "The Memories of an Amputee", The Polish Review, vol. 7, No. 2, Spring 1962, pages 105–110. (A review of Księga rozbitków.)
- [Anonymous], "Kronika: Sydor Rey w zbiorach Syracuse University" (Chronicle: Sydor Rey among the Holdings of the Syracuse University Library), Wiadomości: tygodnik (London), vol. 21, No. 21 (1051), 22 May 1966, page 6.
- Marian Pankowski, "Rzeczywistość nieokrzesana, czyli o wierszach Sydora Reya" (Uncouth Reality: About the Poetry of Sydor Rey), Wiadomości: tygodnik (London), vol. 23, No. 39 (1174), 29 September 1968, page 4. (A review of Rey's collection of poetry Własnymi słowami (1967); see also Rey's response, "W obronie własnej" (In Self-defence), letter to the editor, Wiadomości: tygodnik (London), vol. 23, No. 45 (1180), 10 November 1968, page 6.)
- Richard Sokoloski, "'... Something That Binds Us': Letters of Paweł Mayewski to Tadeusz Różewicz", The Polish Review, vol. 45, No. 2, 2000, pages 131–170.
