= Maryan Zakalnytskyy =

Ukrainian race walker

Personal information
- Born: 19 August 1994 (age 31) Verkhnia, Kalush Raion, Ivano-Frankivsk Oblast, Ukraine

Sport
- Country: Ukraine
- Sport: Athletics
- Event: 50 km Race Walk
Medal record
European Championships
Gold medal – first place	2018 Berlin	50 km walk

Maryan Ihorovych Zakalnytskyy (Ukrainian: Мар'ян Ігорович Закальницький; born 19 August 1994 in Verkhnia, Ivano-Frankivsk Oblast, Ukraine) is a Ukrainian race walker. He is the current European champion in the 50 km walk.

== Career ==
He started his sporting career in Kalush. In 2013 he moved to Kyiv.

In 2018, he won gold medal in the men's 50 kilometres walk at the 2018 European Athletics Championships held in Berlin, Germany.

He studied at the State Pedagogical University in Pereiaslav-Khmelnytskyi.

== Achievements ==
Year	Competition	Venue	Position	Event	Notes
Representing Ukraine
2018	European Championships	Berlin, Germany	1st	50 km	3:46:35
