= Tsineva =

Rural locality in Ivano-Frankivsk Oblast, Ukraine

Tsineva Цінева
- Location in Ivano-Frankivsk Oblast Tsineva (Ukraine)
- Coordinates: 48°53′42″N 24°9′26″E
- Country: Ukraine
- Oblast: Ivano-Frankivsk Oblast
- Raion: Kalush Raion
- Hromada: Duba rural hromada
- Time zone: UTC+2 (EET)
  - Summer (DST): UTC+3 (EEST)
- Postal code: 77640

Tsineva (Ukrainian: Цінева) is a village in the Duba rural hromada of the Kalush Raion of Ivano-Frankivsk Oblast in Ukraine.

== History ==
In the 1515 tax register, the village was recorded as Cherniava (Czerniawa), and 4 lany (about 100 hectares) of cultivated land were documented in the village.

On 19 July 2020, as a result of the administrative-territorial reform and liquidation of the Rozhniativ Raion, the village became part of the Kalush Raion.

== Religion ==
- Saint Michael church (1756, wooden)

== Museum ==
In the village, there is a Museum of Boykivshchyna culture and life.

== Notable residents ==
- Yaroslav Koval (1908–1997), Ukrainian photographer

== Bibliography ==
- "Cieniawa (2)". Geographical Dictionary of the Kingdom of Poland (in Polish). 1. Warszawa: Kasa im. Józefa Mianowskiego. 1880. p. 689.
