= Berlohy =

Rural locality in Ivano-Frankivsk Oblast, Ukraine

Berlohy Берлоги
- Village
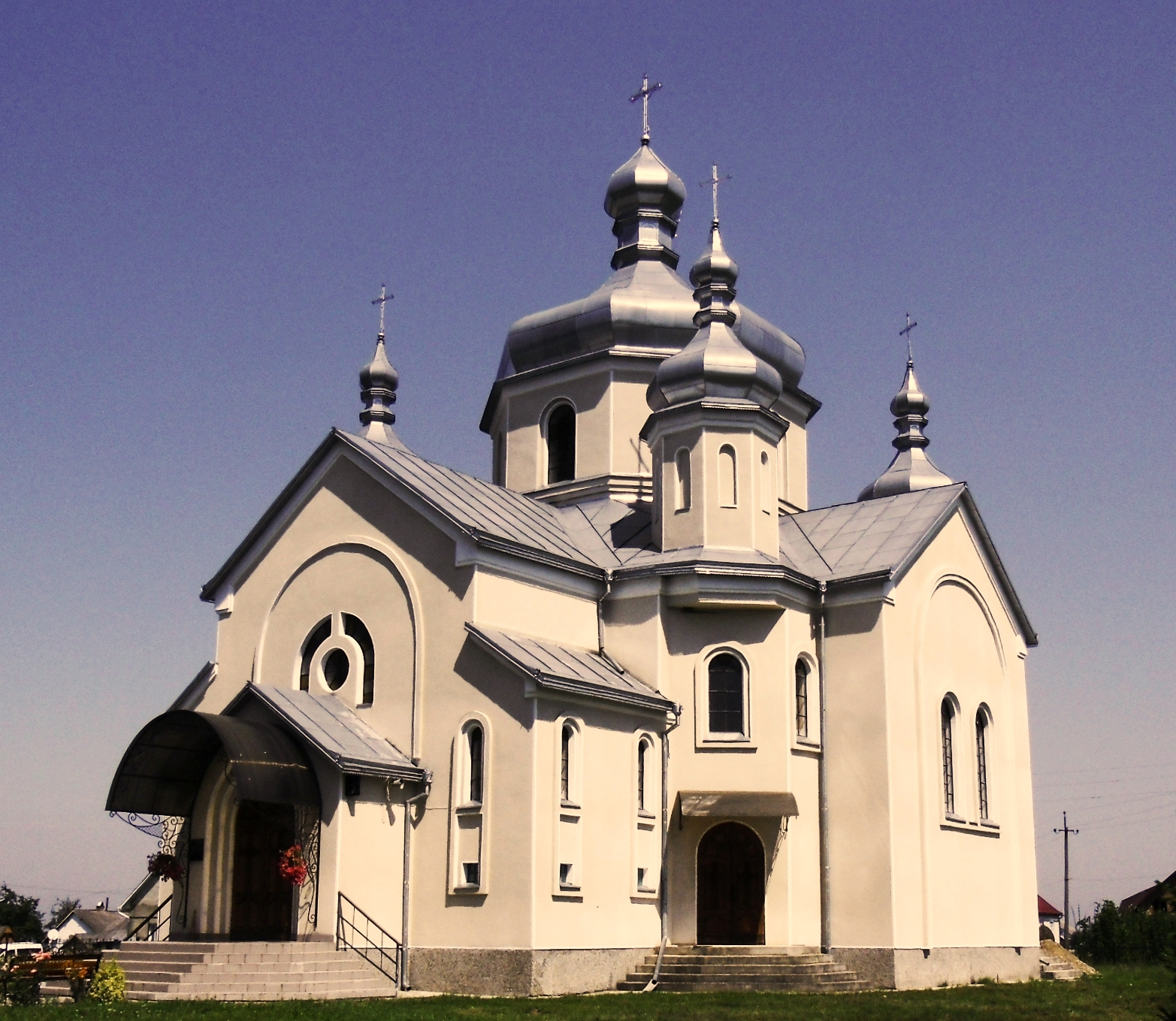
- Church of the Blessed Virgin Mary (was consecrated in 2007).

- Location within Ivano-Frankivsk Oblast
- Coordinates: 48°57′51″N 24°14′51″E
- Country: Ukraine
- Oblast: Ivano-Frankivsk Oblast
- District: Kalush Raion Berlohivska village council.
- Area: 13,346 km^{2} (5,153 sq mi)
- Elevation: 361 m (1,184 ft)
- Population: 1,238
  - Density: 9,276/km^{2} (24,020/sq mi)
- Website: село Берлоги ^{(Ukrainian)}

Berlohy (Ukrainian: Берлоги) is a village (selo) in Kalush Raion, of Ivano-Frankivsk Oblast, approximately 46 km from the regional center, Ivano-Frankivsk. The village is situated on the left bank of the river Limnytsya (Ukrainian: Лі́мниця). Local government — Berlohivska village council. Berlohy belongs to Novytsia rural hromada, one of the hromadas of Ukraine.

== History ==
The first written notation regarding Berlohy dates back to 1387. However, people have lived in the area since the 13th century. Village Berlohy is one of the five oldest settlements in the territory Rozhniativ Raion.

Great religious heritage is shown in the village that previous inhabitants left for future generations. These are: the Church of the Nativity, Wonderworking Icon of Our Lady with Jesus, small wooden chapel (1901) and cross which is near the church (that was supplied by the company "Prosvita" in 1978).

Until 18 July 2020, Berlohy belonged to Rozhniativ Raion. It was the biggest settlement in the raion. The raion was abolished in July 2020 as part of the administrative reform of Ukraine, which reduced the number of raions of Ivano-Frankivsk Oblast to six. The area of Rozhniativ Raion was merged into Kalush Raion.

== Literature ==
- (in Ukrainian) Поташник Микола Дмитрович. Історія села Берлоги Рожнятівського району Івано-Франківської області. — Брошнів - 2011.
