= Yaroslav Koval =

Ukrainian photographer, poet, local historian (1908–1997)

- Ярослав Ількович Коваль
- Born: 16 December 1908; Tsineva, Austria-Hungary (now Ukraine)
- Died: 24 June 1997 (aged 88); Lviv
- Education: University of Lviv
- Occupation: Photographer
- Known for: Photography of Metropolitan Andrey Sheptytsky and others, founding Museum of Boykivshchyna

Yaroslav Koval (Ukrainian: Ярослав Ількович Коваль; 16 December 1908 – 24 June 1997) was a Ukrainian photographer, member of the Ukrainian Photographic Society and the editorial board of the Svitlo i Tin magazine. He was also a poet, local historian, and co-founder of the Museum of Boykivshchyna culture and life.

== Biography ==
Yaroslav Koval was born in Tsineva to a wealthy family. His interest in photography began after World War I, when his brother traded a carbine for a Zeiss "Ideal-222" camera.

He studied at the Ukrainian private gymnasium in Dolyna and later in Rohatyn, where he was influenced by figures such as Antin Krushelnytskyi. In 1930, Koval enrolled in the Faculty of Philosophy at the University of Lviv, taking photography electives under Józef Światkowski. During this time, he was active in the anti-alcohol movement and created exhibits for the First Ukrainian Traveling Anti-Alcohol Exhibition in 1932.

In 1934, Koval opened a photography studio in Rozhniativ. He traveled extensively, documenting the life of local residents and the clergy; his work includes portraits of Metropolitan Andrey Sheptytsky, Archimandrite Klymentiy Sheptytsky, and Bishop Ivan Buchko. He also captured images of notable cultural figures, including the writers Iryna Vilde and Olha Duchyminska, composers Stanislav Lyudkevych, Mykola Kolessa, and Anatoliy Kos-Anatolsky, and artists Oleksa Novakivskyi and Roman Selskyi.

=== Repression and exile ===
Following the Soviet occupation of Western Ukraine in 1939, Koval was briefly arrested. In August 1944, he was arrested again by the NKVD and sentenced to death for alleged collaboration with the OUN. After 39 days on death row, his sentence was commuted to 25 years of hard labor. He served 11 years in the Vorkuta labor camps before being released in 1955.

=== Later Life and Legacy ===
Koval returned to Tsineva in 1955 but was denied a residence permit in Lviv for many years. He worked as a collective farm photographer until he finally moved to Lviv in 1971. After Ukraine's independence in 1991, he helped revive the Svitlo i Tin almanac and published the book Hospodar Perehinskoi Pushchi (1996), dedicated to Metropolitan Sheptytsky.

Koval died on 24 June 1997 and was buried in Tsineva. His grave is marked by a unique tombstone in the shape of a camera.
