= Dovhyi =

Dovhyi (Ukrainian: Довгий) may refer to:

== People ==
- Oleksiy Dovhyi (born 1989), Ukrainian football midfielder

== Places ==
- Dovhyi Island, sandy island in Ochakiv Raion, Mykolaiv Oblast in Ukraine
- Dovhyi Voinyliv, village in Kaluskyi Raion, Ivano-Frankivsk Oblast, Ukraine
