= Spas, Kalush Raion, Ivano-Frankivsk Oblast =

Village in Ivano-Frankivsk Oblast, Ukraine

Spas Спас
- Village
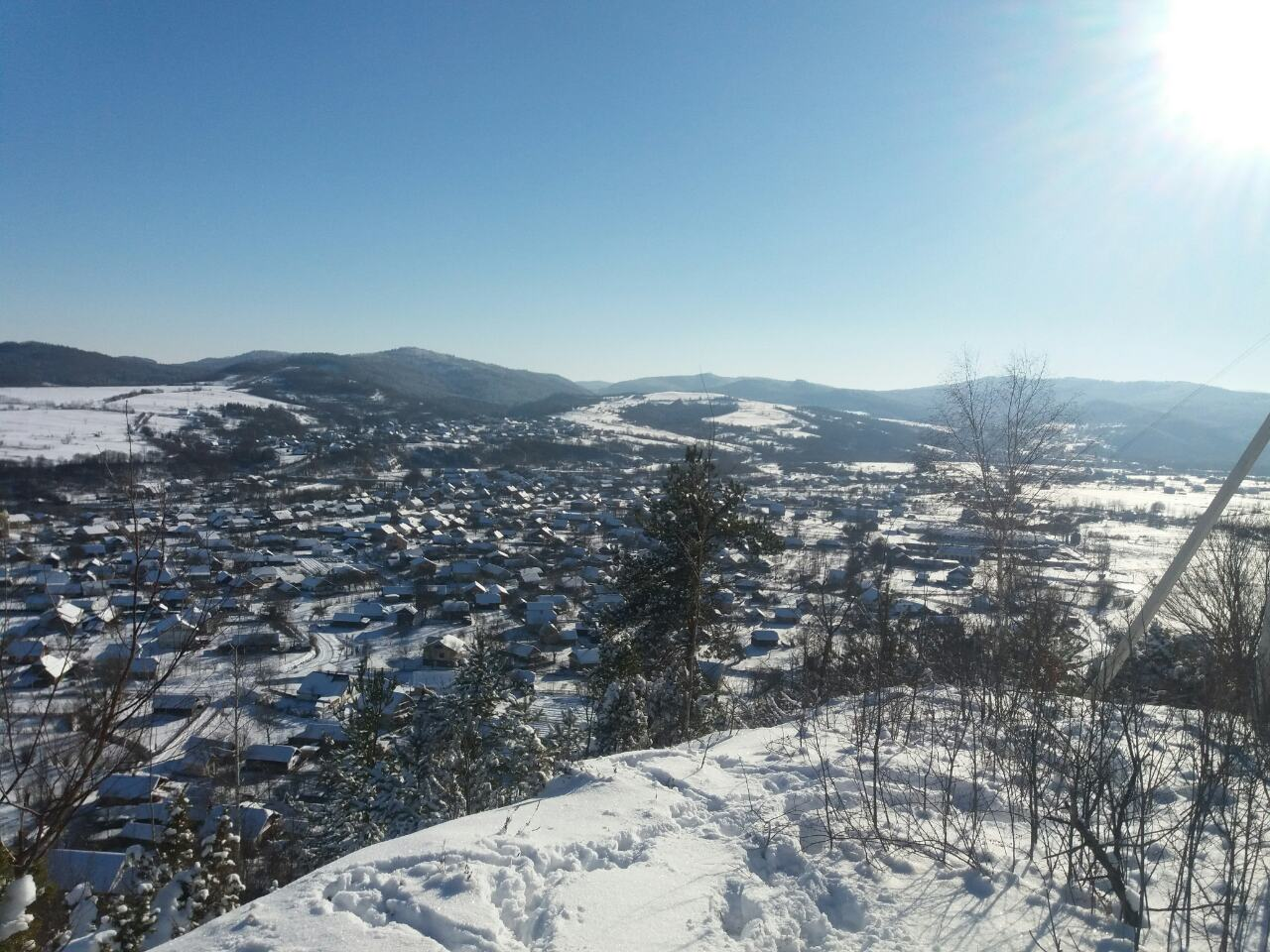

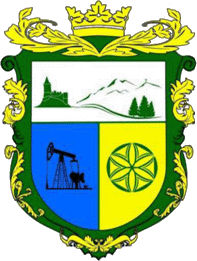
- Coat of arms

- Location of Spas in Ivano-Frankivsk Oblast Location of Spas in Ukraine
- Coordinates: 48°53′34″N 24°03′38″E
- Country: Ukraine
- Oblast: Ivano-Frankivsk Oblast
- Raion: Kalush Raion
- First mentioned: 1469

Population
  - Total: 1,820

Spas (Ukrainian: Спас) is a village in Ivano-Frankivsk Oblast, Ukraine, located in Kalush Raion. It is the administrative centre of Spas rural hromada. Its population is 1,820 (as of 2023).

== History ==
The village of Spas was first mentioned in 1469. Two wooden churches were built in the village in the 18th century, one of which (the Church of the Transfiguration of the Lord, built in 1752) has survived to the present day. In 1939, according to Volodymyr Kubijovyč, the village had a population of 2,750; 2,650 of these people were Ukrainians, 40 were Polish people, 40 were Jews, and the remaining 20 were Germans and of other ethnicities. A monument to five Ukrainian Insurgent Army soldiers who were killed in the village was erected in 2019.

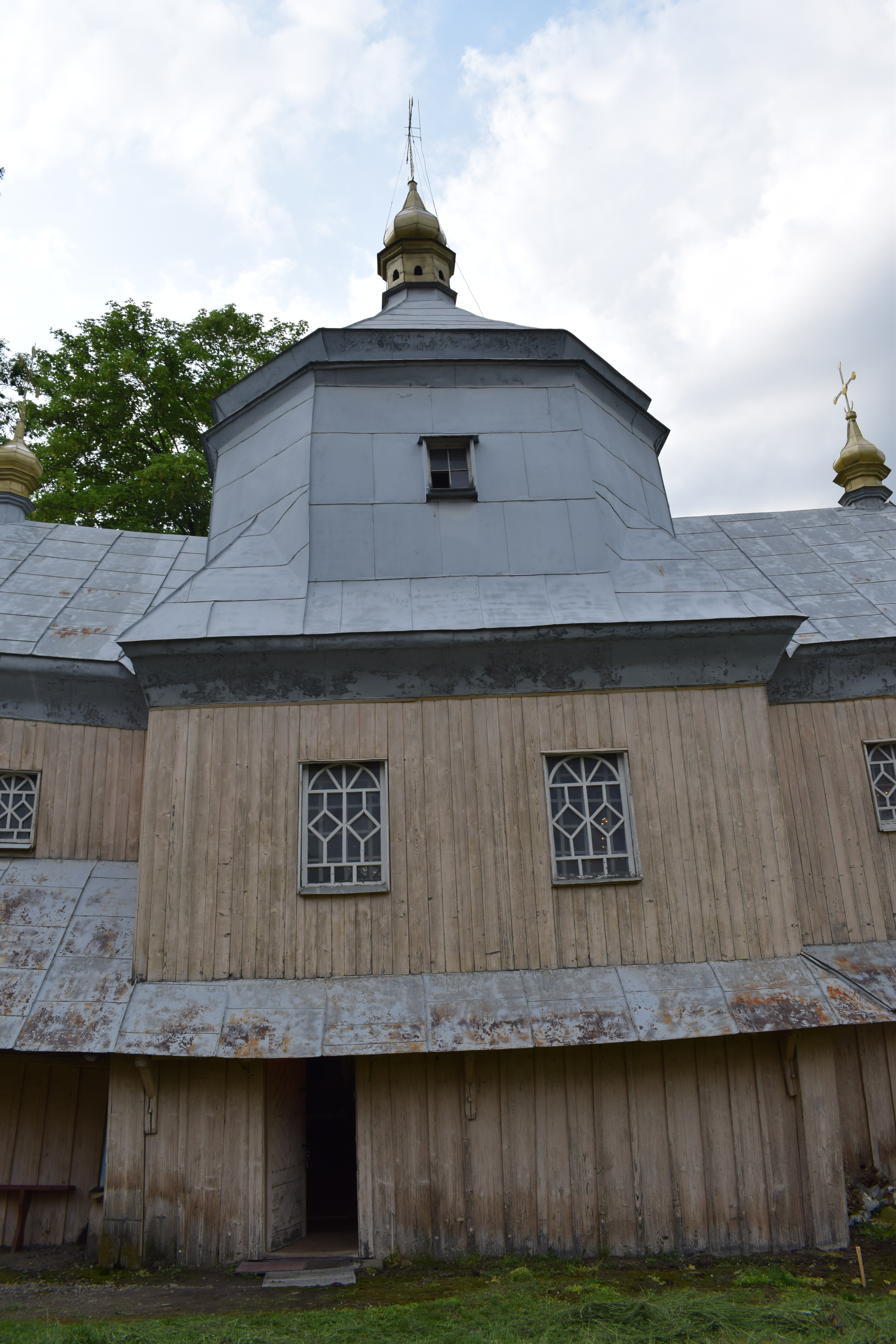
Church of the Transfiguration

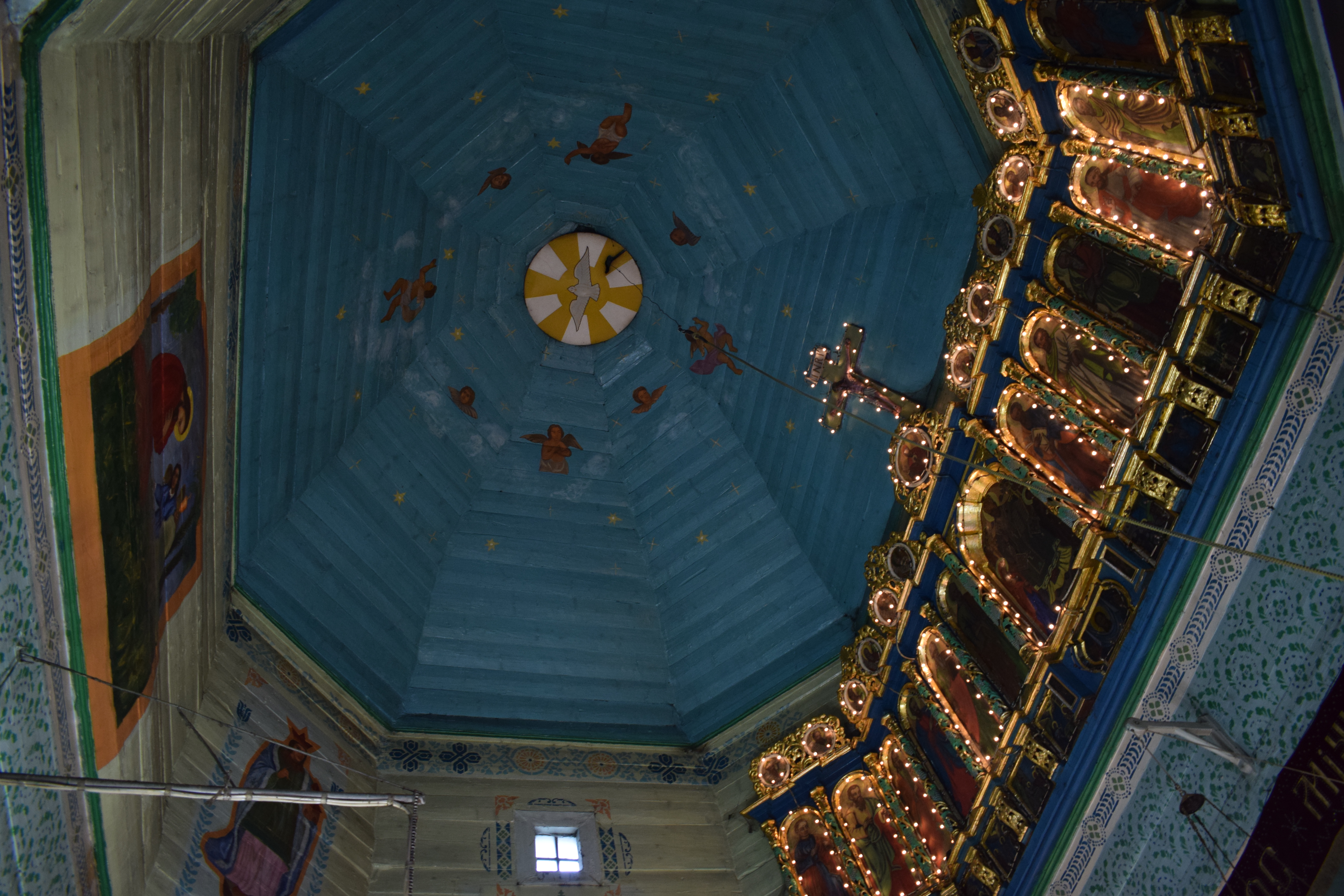
Ceiling

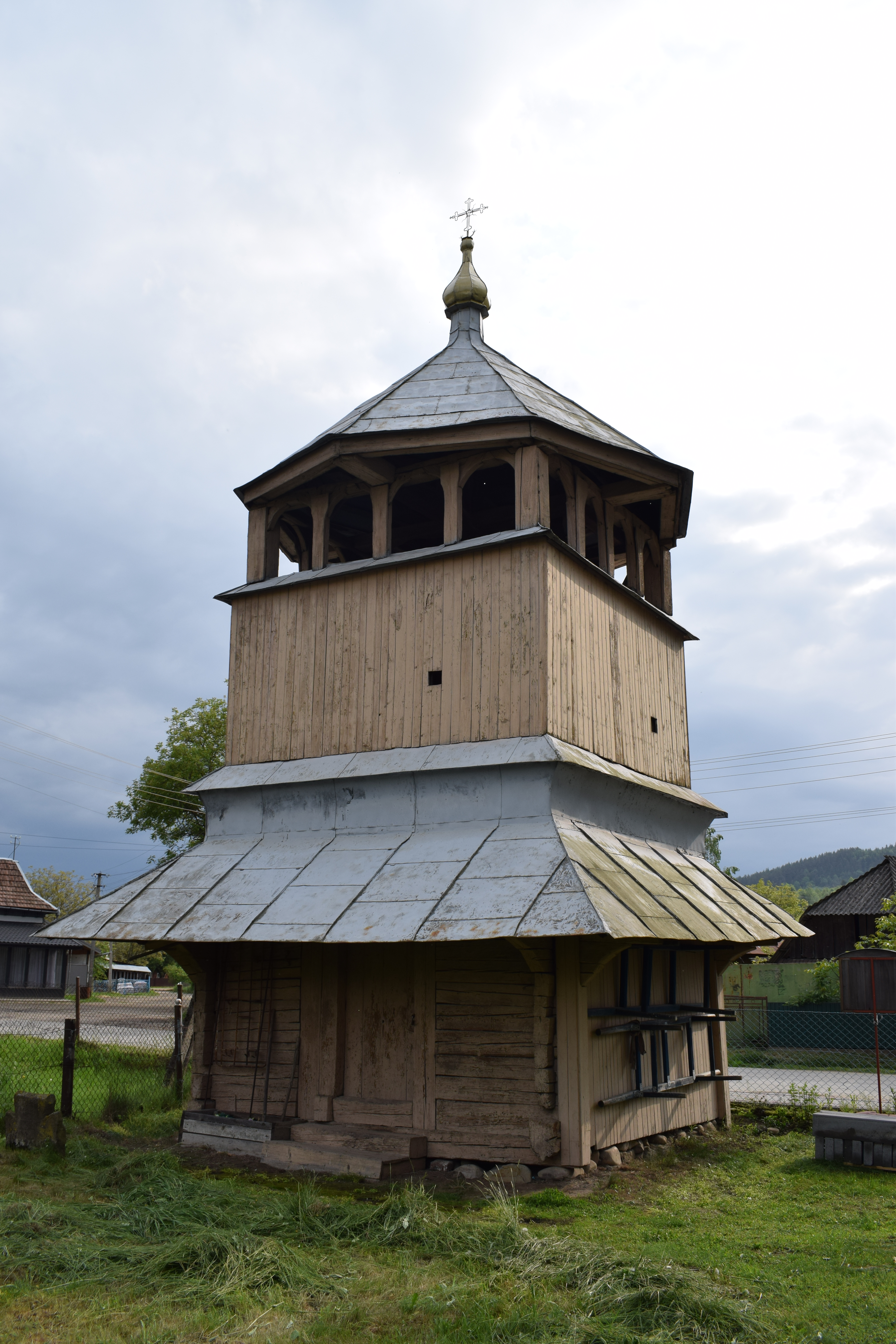
Bell tower

== Notable residents ==
- Mykhailo Vasylyshyn, Soviet soldier accidentally not conferred Hero of the Soviet Union due to an administrative error, later posthumously declared a Hero of Ukraine
