= Morshyn =

City in Lviv Oblast, Ukraine

Morshyn Моршин
- City
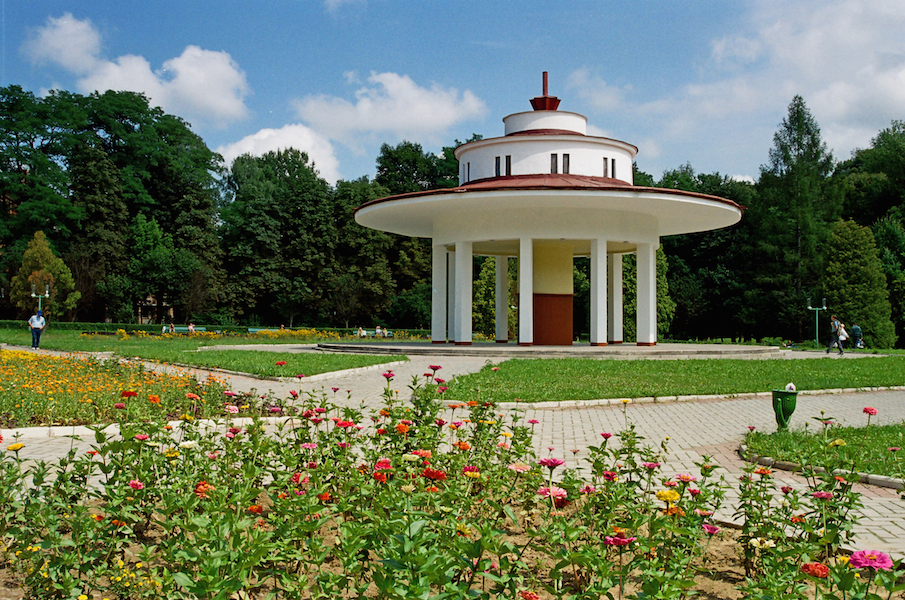
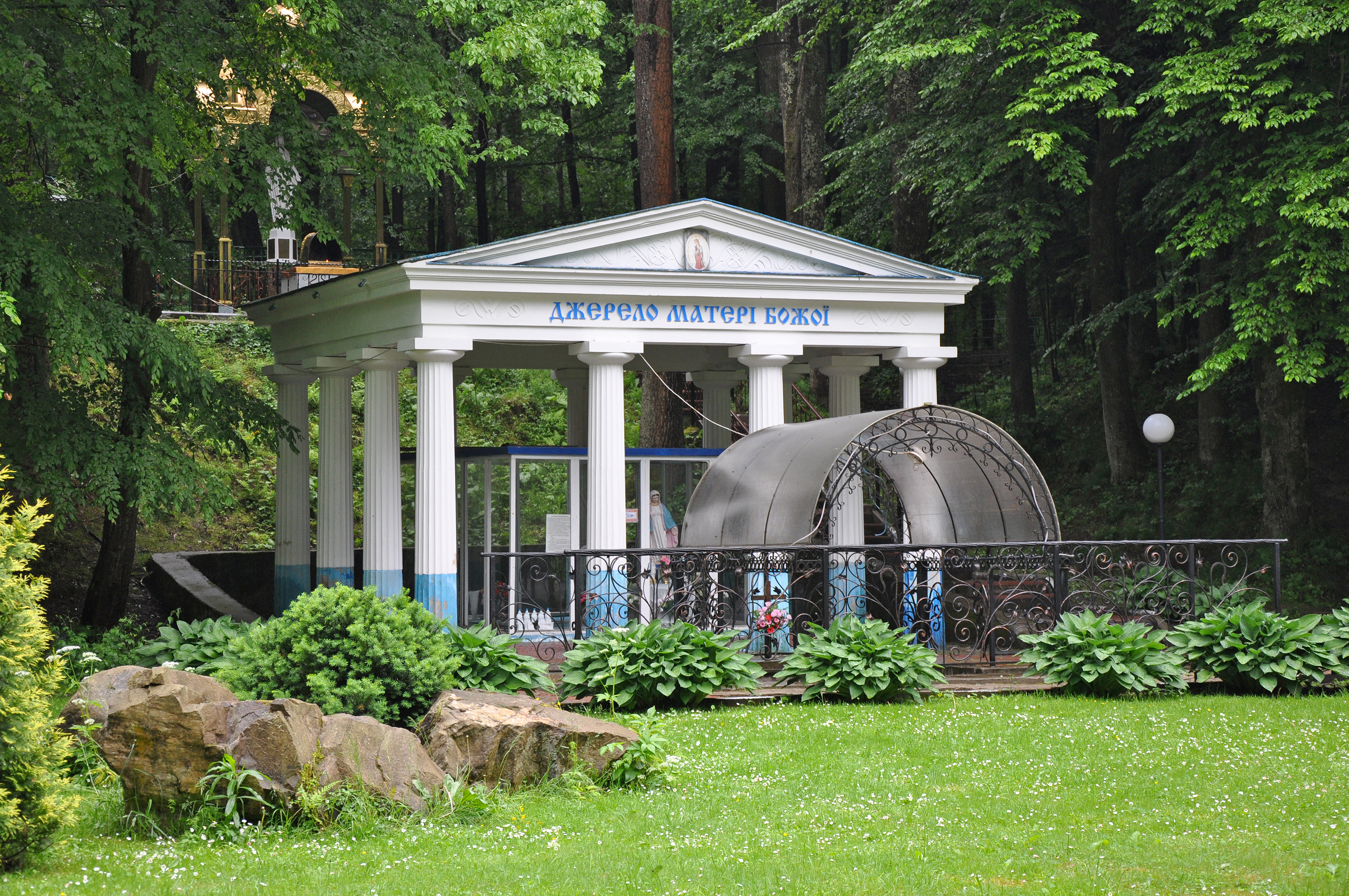
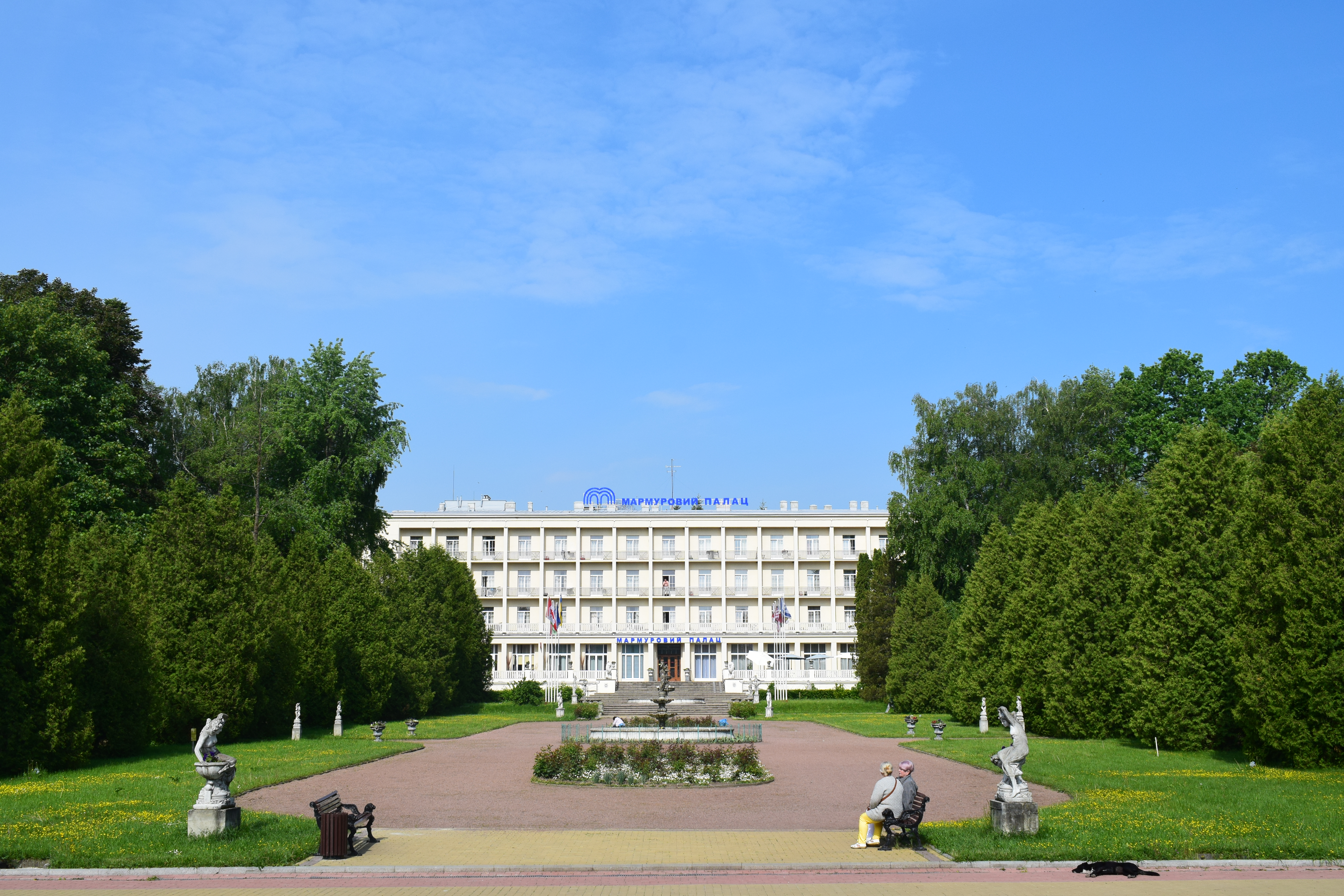
- Top: Old Spring; bottom left: Spring of Virgin Mary; bottom right: Marble Palace Sanatorium

- Flag Coat of arms

- Location within Lviv Oblast Location within Ukraine
- Coordinates: 49°09′0″N 23°52′0″E
- Country: Ukraine
- Oblast: Lviv Oblast
- Raion: Stryi Raion
- Hromada: Morshyn urban hromada
- First mentioned: 1482
- Urban-type settlement: 1948

Government
  - City Chairman Chairman of City Council: Ruslan Ilnytskyi; Mykola Voyevoda

Population (2022)
  - Total: 5,562
- Time zone: UTC+2 (EET)
  - Summer (DST): UTC+3 (EEST)
- Postal code: 79000
- Area code: +380
- Licence plate: BC (before 2004: ТА,ТВ,ТН,ТС)

Morshyn (Ukrainian: Моршин, IPA: [ˈmɔrʃɪn]; Polish: Morszyn-Zdrój) is a small city located at the Eastern Carpathian Foothills within Ukraine's Stryi Raion, Lviv Oblast (region). It hosts the administration of Morshyn urban hromada, one of the hromadas of Ukraine. The population is 5,562 (2022 estimate).

== Overview ==
Historical affiliations

Crown of the Kingdom of Poland 1482–1569
Polish–Lithuanian Commonwealth 1569–1772
Habsburg monarchy 1772–1804
Austrian Empire 1804–1918
West Ukrainian People's Republic 1918-1919
Second Polish Republic 1919–1945
Soviet Union (Ukrainian SSR) 1939–1941
Nazi Germany 1941–1944 (occupation)
Soviet Union (Ukrainian SSR) 1944–1991
Ukraine 1991–present

The first mention of the settlement is found in a court note of 2 January 1482, which indicated that Morshyn and surrounding villages belonged to a nobleman (szlachtic) Juchno Nagwazdan and was part of the Kingdom of Poland. In 1538 the owners of Morshyn, the Branecki family, became interested in the local industry of salt mining and acquired permission from the royal chancellery for the opening of salt mines. Five mine wells were dug out for brine extraction. However, the business did not justify itself as the Morshyns salt was bitter and unfit for consumption. The salt industries fell into decline.

In the second half of the 17th century Morshyn remained a poor village. In 1692, Morshyn accounted for 12 yards (as dwelling units). The settlement was often transferred between owners. Following the first partition of Poland in 1772, Morshyn went to the Austrian Empire.

With the construction of railroad Stryj—Stanislawow through Morshyn, life revived in the village. Since 1878 Morshyn has been known as a spa resort. The first chemical analysis of mineral water was published by a professor of Lviv University, W.Radziszewski, in 1881. Many researchers at that time wrote about the therapeutic properties of Morshyn's brine, comparing it with the waters of famous German, Hungarian, and Czech resorts.

In 1919-1939, Morshyn was in Polish territory and, as "Morszyn-Zdrój," was a popular spa. The spa belonged to the Medical Association (Towarzystwo Lekarskie) from Lviv (Lwów), in late 1920s almost 1000 guests came there yearly. When western Ukraine was under Polish authority, the city was part of the Ivano-Frankivsk regional administration, Stanisławów Voivodeship. Currently the town is located in the close proximity to Ivano-Frankivsk Oblast and the Carpathian Mountains. Currently the city is a major national tourist resort as well as a health resort. The city continues to carry on its legacy as one of the best health resorts in Europe.

Until 18 July 2020, Morshyn was incorporated as a city of oblast significance. In July 2020, as part of the administrative reform of Ukraine, which reduced the number of raions of Lviv Oblast to seven, the city of Morshyn was merged into Stryi Raion.

After the dissolution of the Soviet Union, a couple of football clubs appeared in the city, among which is FC Skala that plays at a local small stadium.

== Gallery ==
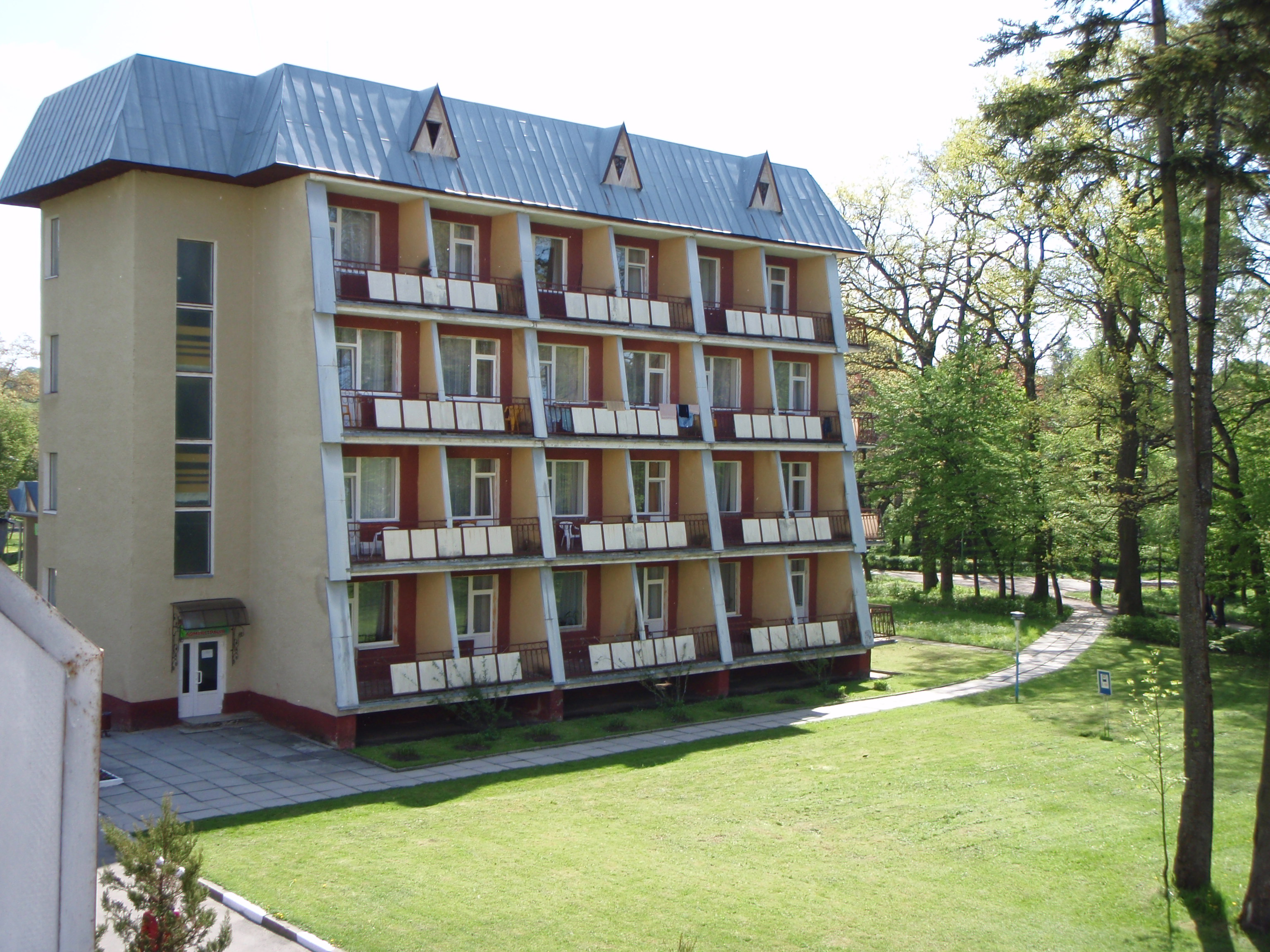
Morshyn sanatorium, Perlyna Prykarpattia (Pearl of the Carpathian Foothills)

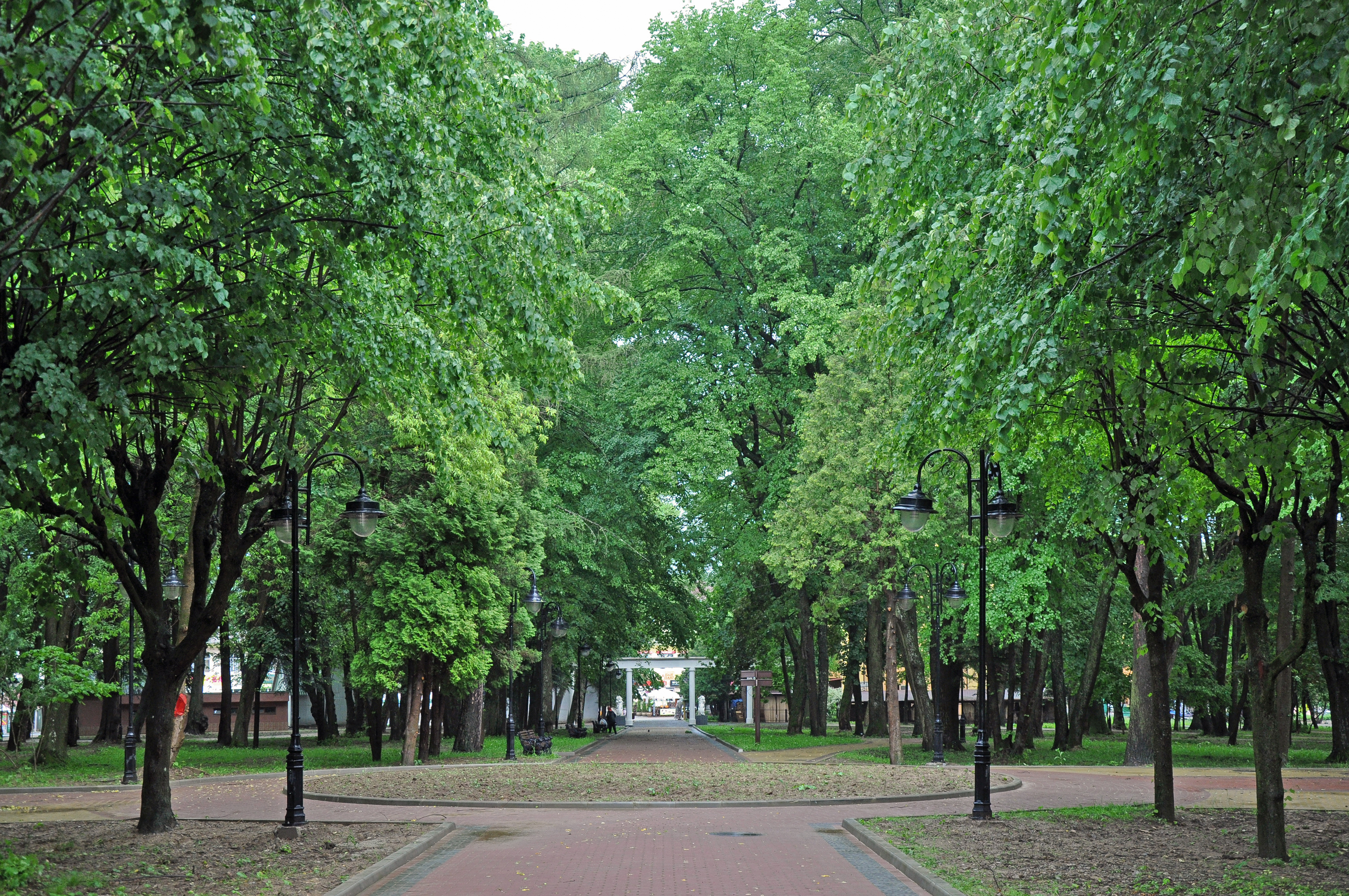
City park

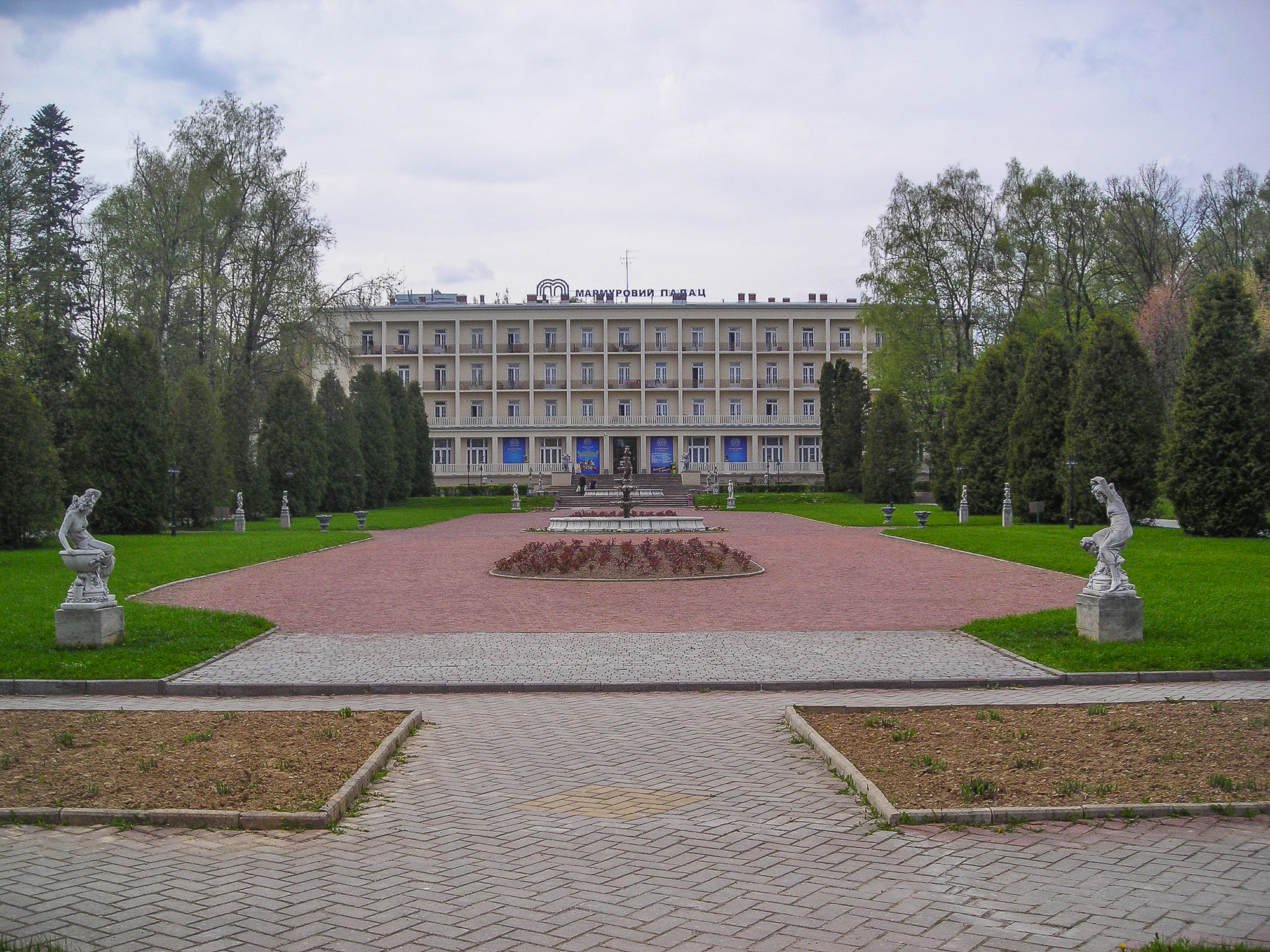
Sanatorium Marmurovyi Palats (Marble Palace)

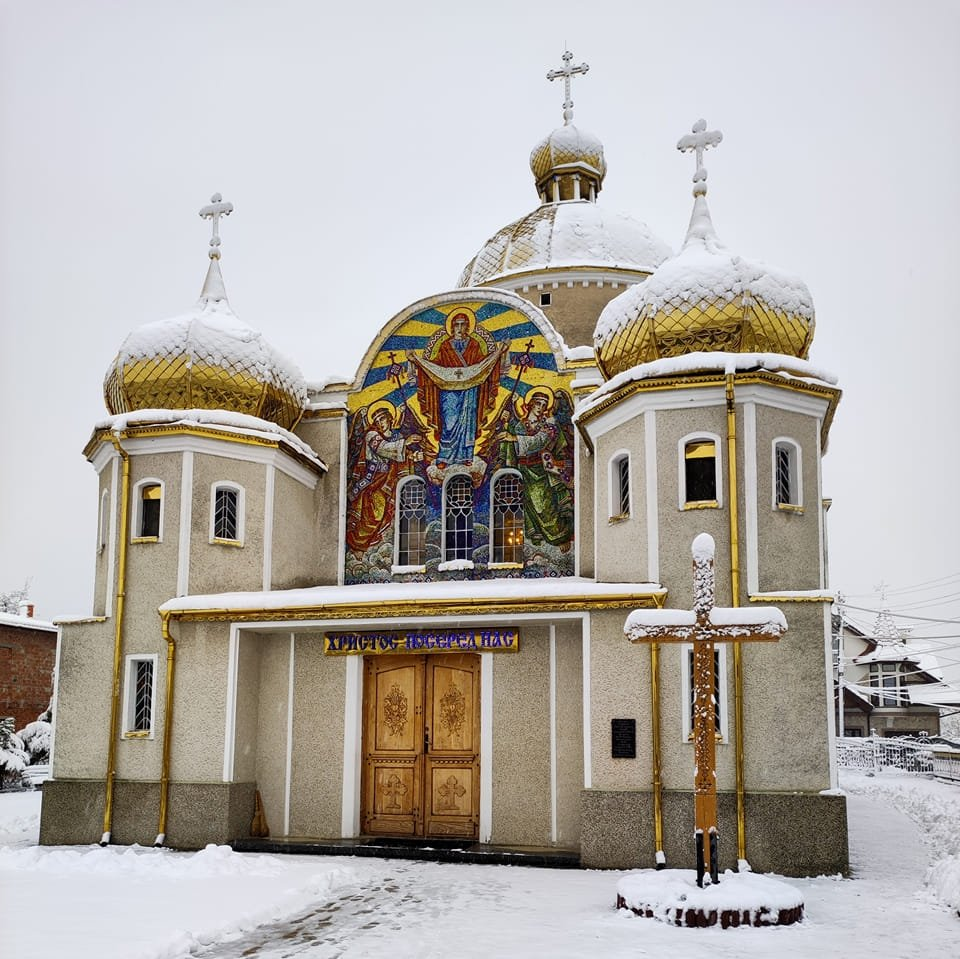
Church of the Intercession of the Blessed Virgin Mary

== See also ==
- FC Skala Stryi (2004)
- FC Medyk Morshyn
