= Voinyliv settlement hromada =

Hromada in Ivano-Frankivsk Oblast, Ukraine

Voinyliv settlement hromada Войнилівська селищна громада
- Hromada
- Interactive map of Voinyliv settlement hromada
- Country: Ukraine
- Oblast: Ivano-Frankivsk
- Raion: Kalush
- Admin. center: Voinyliv

Area
  - Total: 77.07 km^{2} (29.76 sq mi)

Population (2018)
  - Total: 6,477
  - Density: 84.04/km^{2} (217.7/sq mi)
- CATOTTG code: UA26060110000025739
- Settlements: 16
- Rural settlements: 1
- Villages: 15
- Website: voynylivska-gromada.gov.ua

Voinyliv settlement hromada (Ukrainian: Войнилівська селищна громада) is a hromada in Ukraine, in Kalush Raion of Ivano-Frankivsk Oblast. The administrative center is the rural settlement of Voinyliv.

== Settlements ==
The hromada consists of 1 rural settlement (Voinyliv) and 15 villages:

- Dibrova
- Dovzhka
- Dovpotiv
- Dubovytsia
- Kudlativka
- Luka
- Moshkivtsi
- Pavlykivka
- Perevozets
- Perekosy
- Serednia
- Sivka-Voinylivska
- Slobidka
- Tomashivtsi
- Tsvitova
