= Novytsia =

Village in Ivano-Frankivsk Oblast, Ukraine

Novytsia Новиця
- Village
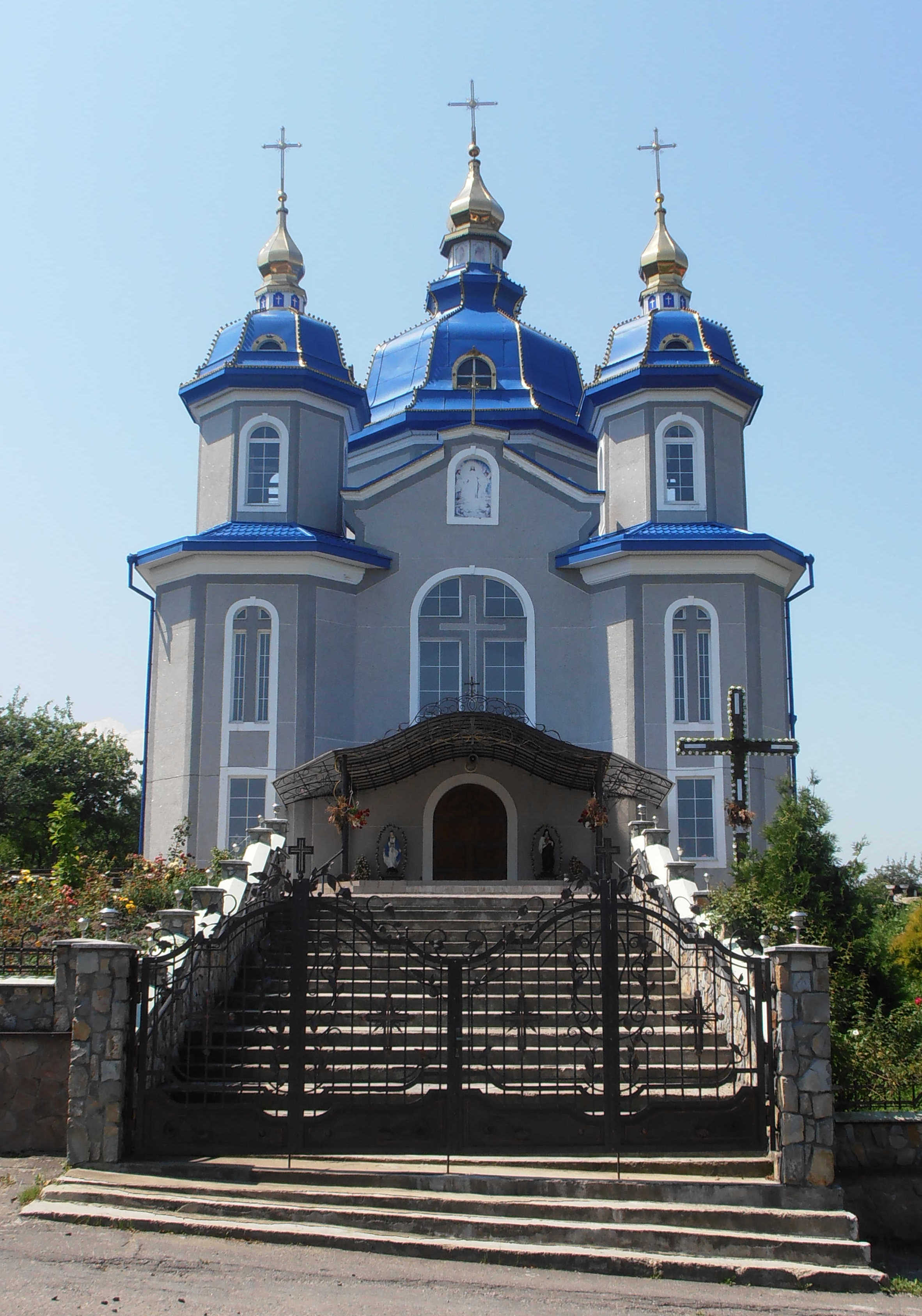
- The Church of the Transfiguration of the Lord in Novytsia
- Interactive map of Novytsia
- Location of Novytsia in Ivano-Frankivsk Oblast Location of Novytsia in Ukraine
- Coordinates: 48°57′36″N 24°19′53″E
- Country: Ukraine
- Oblast: Ivano-Frankivsk Oblast
- Raion: Kalush Raion
- First mentioned: 1367

Population
  - Total: 3,733

Novytsia (Ukrainian: Новиця; Polish: Nowica) is a village in Ivano-Frankivsk Oblast, Ukraine, in Kalush Raion. It is the administrative centre of Novytsia rural hromada. Its population is 3,733 (as of 2023).

== History ==
Novytsia was first mentioned in a charter granted by Casimir III the Great in 1367. This makes it one of the oldest-known continually-inhabited settlements in Prykarpattia. During the 1650s, the village came under the ownership of the Czartoryski family. Other parts of the village were owned by Yosyf Shumlyansky. After the Partitions of Poland, the Austrian Empire took over Novytsia, and the Ukrainian cultural organisation Prosvita later operated in the village.

In 1939, Novytsia had a population of 3,620, including 3,530 Ukrainians, 30 Latynnyky, 30 Polish people, and 30 Jews. The Ukrainian Insurgent Army operated in the village during its resistance to the Soviet Union.

== Notable residents ==
- Vira Rychakivska, Ukrainian economist
