= Novytsia rural hromada =

Hromada in Ivano-Frankivsk Oblast, Ukraine

Novytsia rural hromada Новицька сільська громада
- hromada
- Location within Ivano-Frankivsk Oblast Location within Ukraine
- Coordinates: 48°57′36″N 24°19′53″E
- Country: Ukraine
- Oblast: Ivano-Frankivsk Oblast
- Raion: Kalush Raion
- Administrative center: Novytsia

Area
  - Total: 8,243 km^{2} (3,183 sq mi)

Population (2018)
  - Total: 10,395
- Villages: 10
- Website: novotg.gov.ua

Novytsia rural hromada (Ukrainian: Новицька сільська громада) is a hromada in Ukraine, in Kalush Raion of Ivano-Frankivsk Oblast. The administrative center is the village of Novytsia.

== Settlements ==
The hromada consists of 10 villages:

- Berezhnytsia
- Berlohy
- Hrabivka
- Dobrovliany
- Zavii
- Zelenyi Yar
- Novytsia
- Pidmykhailia
- Serednii Uhryniv
- Staryi Uhryniv
