= Voinyliv =

Rural locality in Ivano-Frankivsk Oblast, Ukraine

Voinyliv Войнилів
- Rural settlement
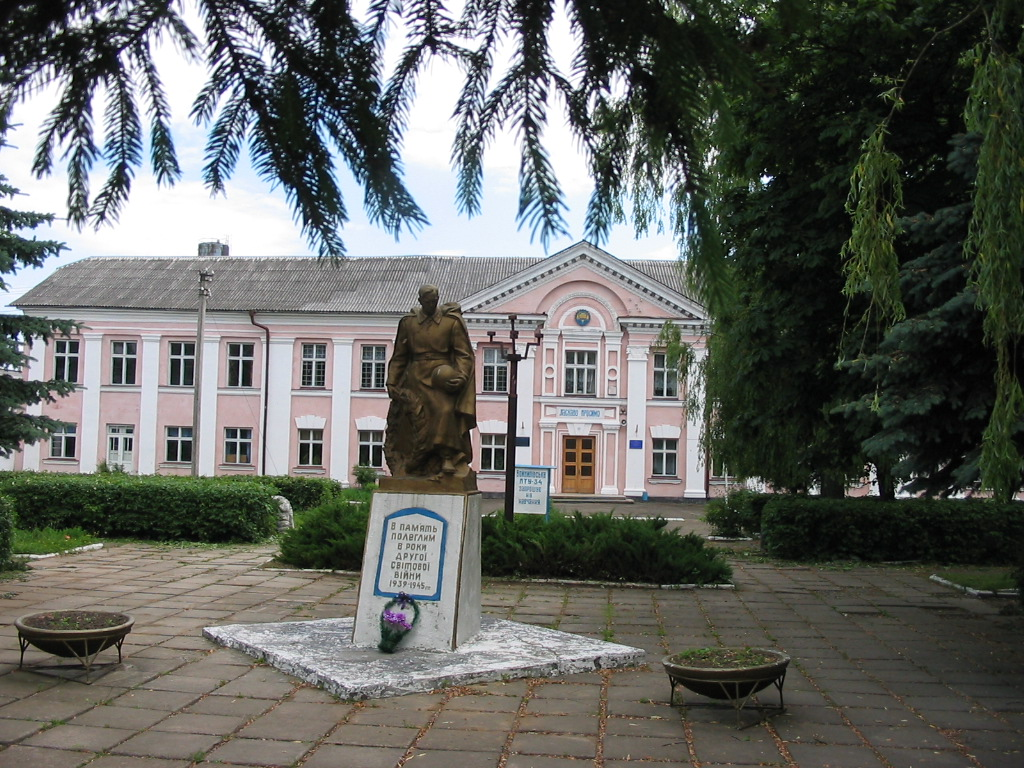
- Soviet era memorial to those who perished in World War II in Voynyliv. Building of Professional Technical College of Voynyliv is on the back.
- Interactive map of Voinyliv
- Location within Ivano-Frankivsk Oblast Location within Ukraine
- Coordinates: 49°07′43″N 24°29′39″E
- Country: Ukraine
- Oblast: Ivano-Frankivsk
- Raion: Kalush
- Hromada: Voinyliv settlement hromada
- First mentioned: 15th century

Population (2022)
  - Total: ▼2,601
- Postal code: 77316
- Area code: +380 03472

Voynyliv (Ukrainian: Войнилів / Voinyliv / Vojnyliv, Polish: Wojniłów / Voyneeloow, Russian: Войнилов / Voynilov / Voinilov) is a rural settlement in western Ukraine. Voynyliv is situated in Kalush Raion of Ivano-Frankivsk Oblast, approx. 100 km from Lviv. The closest city is Kalush to the west. The distance to the closest railway station in Kalush is 22 km and it is 42 km from Voynyliv to the city of Ivano-Frankivsk. Voinyliv hosts the administration of Voinyliv settlement hromada, one of the hromadas of Ukraine. Population: 2,601 (2022 estimate).

Voynyliv lies in the lowlands of the Dniester river basin and is located near the Sivka and Bolokhivka Rivers, the tributaries to the Dniester River.

Postal code for Voynyliv is 77316 and telephone code is +380 03472. In 2002-2005 there was built a school in Voynyliv designed for 689 students.

Within Kalush Raion there is also somewhat smaller village Dovhyi Voynyliv (Ukr.: Long Voynyliv), which should not be mixed with the town of Voynyliv.

== History ==
First historical mention about Voynyliv dates to the 15th century, namely in accounts of the battle of Turkish armies with Polish troops of king Jan III Sobieski of Poland. According to other sources it was founded in 1352 as village Prokopivka and received town privileges in 1443.

Prior to World War II, Voynyliv like most of western Ukraine, belonged to Poland and had ab. 1000 inhabitants. It was a seat of village commune (Polish: gmina) in the district (Polish: powiat) of Kalush. The population of the town consisted of Jews engaged in commerce as well as Poles and Ukrainians. There was Roman Catholic church in Voynyliv though it was taken down by Soviets in 1945. In inter-war period there existed the Society of Polish Landmen. Rich Polish landlords had estates in nearby villages of Serednye, Babyn and Dorokhiv. In 1926 the first independent district union of milkmen was started in Voynyliv with good results, after which other unions started to emerge.

There were two schools in town — one for men and one for women.

Until 26 January 2024, Voinyliv was designated urban-type settlement. On this day, a new law entered into force which abolished this status, and Voinyliv became a rural settlement.

=== Coat of arms ===
Voynyliv had historical coat of arms, officially approved in 1689. It depicted a lion emerging from a fortress wall and holding the wreath in its paws. Similar design of town's coat of arms — a yellow lion on a blue background (national colours of Ukraine) with a fortress wall in the lower part, functions as official symbol of the town today.

== Jewish community ==
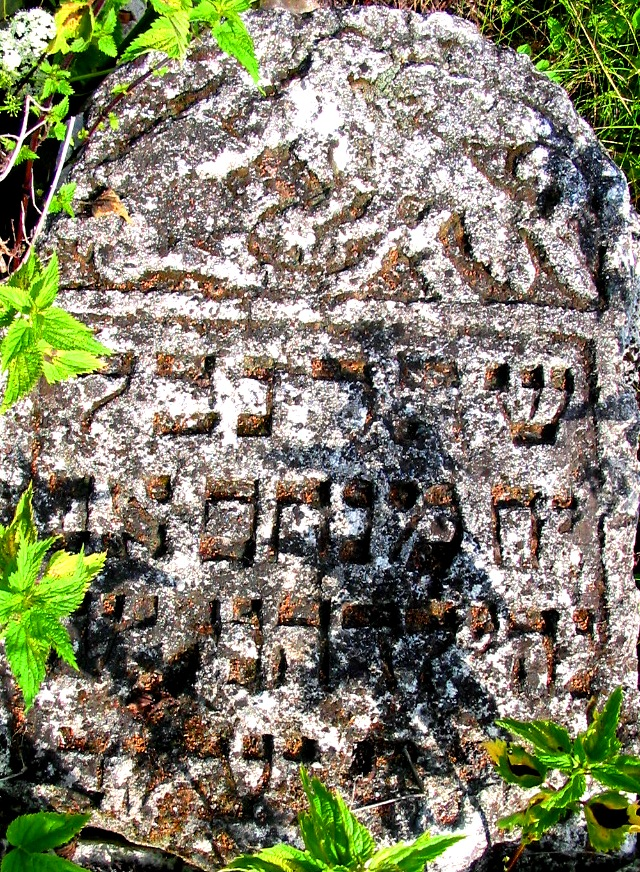
Jewish gravestone with engraved Hebrew text and a mythological animal on the top at the Jewish cemetery of Voynyliv. The top right Hebrew letter is Shin.

The book Where Once We Walked states that before the war Voynyliv had a Jewish population of 944 persons and had a Jewish temple. The Voynyliv Jewish community murdered in the Holocaust, though some Jews stemming from Voynyliv are found in the US and United Kingdom from pre-war immigration. The remnants of Jewish cemetery in Voynyliv preserved.

== Sources ==
- (in Polish) Wojniłów w Słowniku geograficznym Królestwa Polskiego (Voynyliv in the Geographic Dictionary of Polish Kingdom).
