= Verkhnia =

Village in Ivano-Frankivsk Oblast, Ukraine

Verkhnia Верхня
- Village
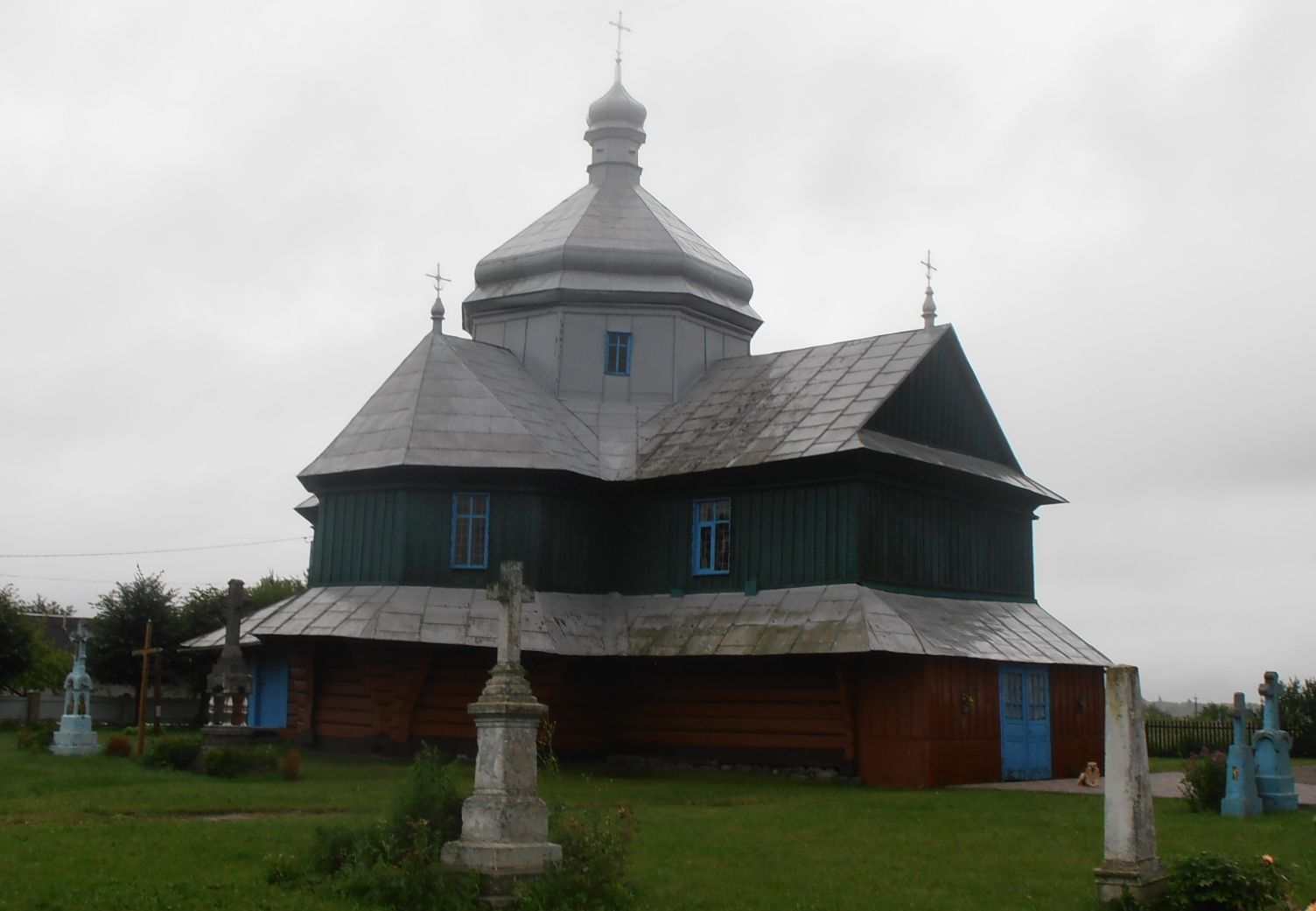
- Saint John the Baptist Church in Verkhnia

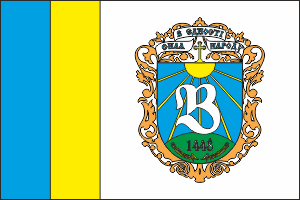
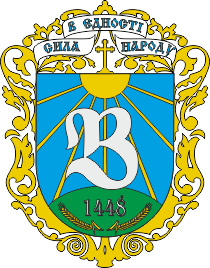
- Flag Coat of arms

- Location of Verkhnia in Ivano-Frankivsk Oblast Location of Verkhnia in Ukraine
- Coordinates: 49°06′08″N 24°18′53″E
- Country: Ukraine
- Oblast: Ivano-Frankivsk Oblast
- Raion: Kalush Raion
- First mentioned: 1448

Population
  - Total: 2,605

Verkhnia (Ukrainian: Верхня; Polish: Wierzchnia) is a village in Kalush Raion, Ivano-Frankivsk Oblast, Ukraine. It is the administrative centre of the Verkhnia rural hromada. Its population is 2,605 (as of 2023).

== History ==
Verkhnia was first mentioned in 1448. Production of natural gas began in the village in 1955.

In 1939, Verkhnia had a population of 2,190 people, including 2,170 Ukrainians and 20 Polish people, according to Volodymyr Kubijovyč. The Polish population was ethnically cleansed in 1944 by the Ukrainian Insurgent Army, which operated actively in Verkhnia. In 1988, a narodny dim was established in the village, including a memorial to Organisation of Ukrainian Nationalists leader Mykola Klymyshyn.

== Notable residents ==
- Stefania Hrebenovska, Ukrainian theatre director
- Bohdan Yatskiv, Ukrainian Insurgent Army commander
- Maryan Zakalnytskyy, Ukrainian race walker
