= Spas rural hromada =

Hromada in Ivano-Frankivsk Oblast, Ukraine

Spas rural hromada Спаська сільська громада
- Hromada
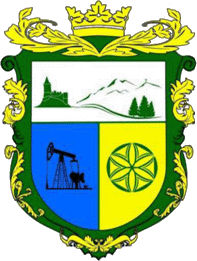
- Coat of arms
- Interactive map of Spas rural hromada
- Country: Ukraine
- Oblast: Ivano-Frankivsk
- Raion: Kalush
- Admin. center: Spas

Area
  - Total: 83.2 km^{2} (32.1 sq mi)

Population (2018)
  - Total: 3,126
  - Density: 37.6/km^{2} (97.3/sq mi)
- CATOTTG code: UA26060250000064599
- Settlements: 6
- Villages: 6
- Website: spaska-gromada.gov.ua

Spas rural hromada (Ukrainian: Спаська сільська громада) is a hromada in Ukraine, in Kalush Raion of Ivano-Frankivsk Oblast. The administrative center is the village of Spas.

== Settlements ==
The hromada consists of 6 villages:

- Spas
- Lypovytsia
- Luhy
- Pidsukhy
- Pohorilets
- Sukhodil
