= Nicholas Ilkov =

Ukrainian Greek Catholic priest (1890–1940)

Mikołaj Ilków (Ukrainian: Mykola Іlkіv, English: Nicholas Ilkov, born on 10 December 1890 – died in 1940, Katyn) was a Polish Greek Catholic priest of Ukrainian origin, member of the Polish parliament or Sejm and victim of the Katyn Massacre.

== Biography ==
Ilków was born to Mikołaj, a peasant, on 10 December 1890 in Przewoziec near Kałusz in the part of Poland that had been seized by the Habsburg Empire. He attended the Franz Joseph I secondary school in Stanisławów. He then studied theology at Jan Kazimierz University in the Polish city of Lwów, and was ordained as a Catholic priest of the Byzantine rite on 30 March 1919. He started working as a catechist in schools in Kałusz.

Ilków was co-founder of the Agrarian Ukrainian Peasant Party. On its behalf, he was elected to the Sejm of the 1st Term of the interwar period in 1922. He was member of parliament for the whole 5-year term, i.e. until 1927. After the end of his Sejm term, he became parish priest in Niżniów in the Stanisławów diocese. On February 27, 1928, he became a reservist of the divines of the Polish Army and was simultaneously appointed chaplain of the reserve with seniority dated 1 January 1 1927 and the 399th position in the military clergy (Greek Catholic rite). He was called to active service as a reserve priest in July 1928, becoming the administrator of the Greek Catholic military parish in Łódź. He was renamed professional military chaplain on 27 June 1935 with the rank of chaplain with seniority dated 1 August 1928. He served as parish priest of the Annunciation of the Blessed Virgin Mary parish at the garrison church of St. Jerzy in Łódź until September 1939, the month in which both the Nazi German and the Soviet invasion of Poland happened.

After the German invasion of Poland on 1 September 1939, which marks the beginning of World War 2, Ilków was in the city of Lwów, besieged by the Germans. After the Soviet attack on 17 September 1939 and the capitulation of Lwów, he became a Soviet prisoner-of-war, just like thousands of professional militaries and policeman and reservists. He was interred at the special NKVD interrogation camp in Starobelsk in the Ukrainian Soviet Socialist Republic. From here he was transferred to an identical camp in Kozelsk. This follows a letter from the commandant of the Kozelsk camp about "receiving a convoy of two priests from the former Polish army" dated 28 April 1940. From here Ilków was taken to the Katyn forest (Transfer List No. 052/4 from 27.04.1940) to be shot dead by NKVD functionaries in Katyn alongside ca 4,400 fellow Polish PoWs. He was buried in a mass grave.

At the location of the mass graves the Katyn Polish War Cemetery was inaugurated by the Polish authorities in and this is where the victims, including Ilków, lie. His body was identified during the 1943 exhumation-study of the mass graves by the Nazi Germans. He is enumerated in the "Amtliches Material zum Massenmord von Katyn" (Berlin 1943) with the no. AM-232-2455 and in the Technical Commission of the Polish Red Cross with no. 02455 (in both cases his surname is misread as "Ilnow").
