= Verkhnia rural hromada =

Hromada in Ivano-Frankivsk Oblast, Ukraine

Verkhnia rural hromada Верхнянська сільська громада
- Hromada
- Interactive map of Verkhnia rural hromada
- Country: Ukraine
- Oblast: Ivano-Frankivsk
- Raion: Kalush
- Admin. center: Verkhnia

Area
  - Total: 140.62 km^{2} (54.29 sq mi)

Population (2018)
  - Total: 10,584
  - Density: 75.267/km^{2} (194.94/sq mi)
- CATOTTG code: UA26060050000042523
- Settlements: 12
- Villages: 12
- Website: verhnyanskasr.gov.ua

Verkhnia rural hromada (Ukrainian: Верхнянська сільська громада) is a hromada in Ukraine, in Kalush Raion of Ivano-Frankivsk Oblast. The administrative center is the village of Verkhnia.

== Settlements ==
The hromada consists of 12 villages:

- Bolokhiv
- Verkhnia
- Vylky
- Humeniv
- Dovhyi Voinyliv
- Zavadka
- Zbora
- Ivankova
- Kulynka
- Nehivtsi
- Stankova
- Stepanivka
