= Duba, Ukraine =

Village in Ivano-Frankivsk Oblast, Ukraine

Duba Дуба
- Village
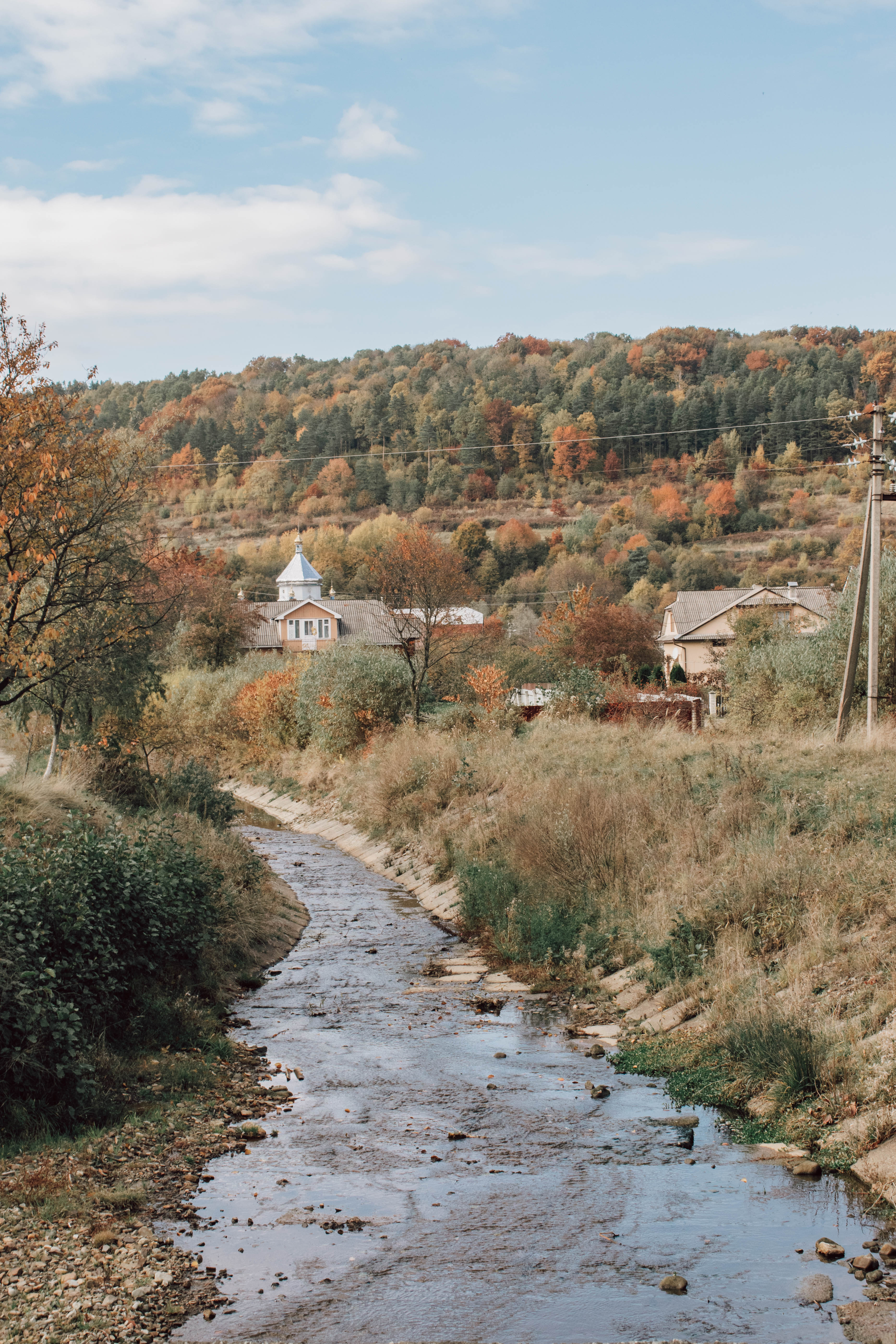
- Saint Nicholas Church in Duba
- Interactive map of Duba
- Location of Duba in Ivano-Frankivsk Oblast Location of Duba in Ukraine
- Coordinates: 48°50′53″N 24°9′12″E
- Country: Ukraine
- Oblast: Ivano-Frankivsk Oblast
- Raion: Kalush Raion
- Established: 1535

Duba (Ukrainian: Дуба) is a village in Ivano-Frankivsk Oblast, Ukraine, located in Kalush Raion. It is the centre of the Duba rural hromada.

== History ==
The village of Duba was founded in 1535. Its residents participated in the 1648 Khmelnytsky Uprising.

The Saint Nicholas Church of Duba, a wooden church, was first mentioned in 1685, and was also mentioned as part of the Roman Catholic Archdiocese of Lviv in 1708. Under the Soviet Union it was part of the Russian Orthodox Church, but it is today owned by the Ukrainian Greek Catholic Church.

== Demographics ==
In 1939, Duba had a population of 1,470. Of these, 1,440 were Ukrainians, 10 were Poles, and another 20 were Latynnyky, a Roman Catholic subgroup of Ukrainians.

In the 1989 Soviet census Duba had a population of 1,269. This number dropped to 1,138 by the 2001 Ukrainian census. According to the 2001 census, 99.74% of the population spoke Ukrainian, while the remaining 0.17% spoke Russian.

== Notable residents ==
- Svitlana Blonska, Ukrainian poet
