= Duba rural hromada =

Hromada in Ivano-Frankivsk Oblast, Ukraine

Duba rural hromada Дубівська сільська громада
- Hromada
- Interactive map of Duba rural hromada
- Country: Ukraine
- Oblast: Ivano-Frankivsk
- Raion: Kalush
- Admin. center: Duba

Area
  - Total: 91.9 km^{2} (35.5 sq mi)

Population
  - Total: 6,958
  - Density: 75.7/km^{2} (196/sq mi)
- CATOTTG code: UA26060150000074921
- Settlements: 11
- Villages: 11
- Website: duba-gromada.gov.ua

Duba rural hromada (Ukrainian: Дубівська сільська громада) is a hromada in Ukraine, in Kalush Raion of Ivano-Frankivsk Oblast. The administrative center is the village of Duba.

== Settlements ==
The hromada consists of 11 villages:

- Vilkhivka
- Duba
- Dubshary
- Ivanivka
- Kniazivske
- Letsivka
- Pidlissia
- Ripne
- Roshniate
- Tsineva
- Yasenovets
