= Morshyn urban hromada =

Hromada in Lviv Oblast, Ukraine

Morshyn urban hromada Моршинська міська громада
- Hromada
- Seal
- Interactive map of Morshyn urban hromada
- Country: Ukraine
- Oblast: Lviv Oblast
- Raion: Stryi Raion
- Admin. center: Morshyn

Area
  - Total: 1,222 km^{2} (472 sq mi)

Population (2021)
  - Total: 14,388
  - Density: 11.77/km^{2} (30.49/sq mi)
- CATOTTG code: UA46100130000048262
- Settlements: 14
- Cities: 1
- Villages: 13
- Website: morshyn-rada.gov.ua

Morshyn urban hromada (Ukrainian: Моршинська міська громада) is a hromada in Ukraine, in Stryi Raion of Lviv Oblast. The administrative center is the city of Morshyn.

== Settlements ==
The hromada consists of 1 city (Morshyn) and 13 villages:

- Bania Lysovytska
- Verkhnia Lukavytsia
- Volia-Zaderevatska
- Horishnie
- Dovhe
- Dolishnie
- Zaderevach
- Lysovychi
- Nyzhnia Lukavytsia
- Pyla
- Smolianyi
- Stankiv
- Falysh
