= Lysovychi =

Rural locality in Lviv Oblast, Ukraine

Lysovychi Лисовичі
- Village
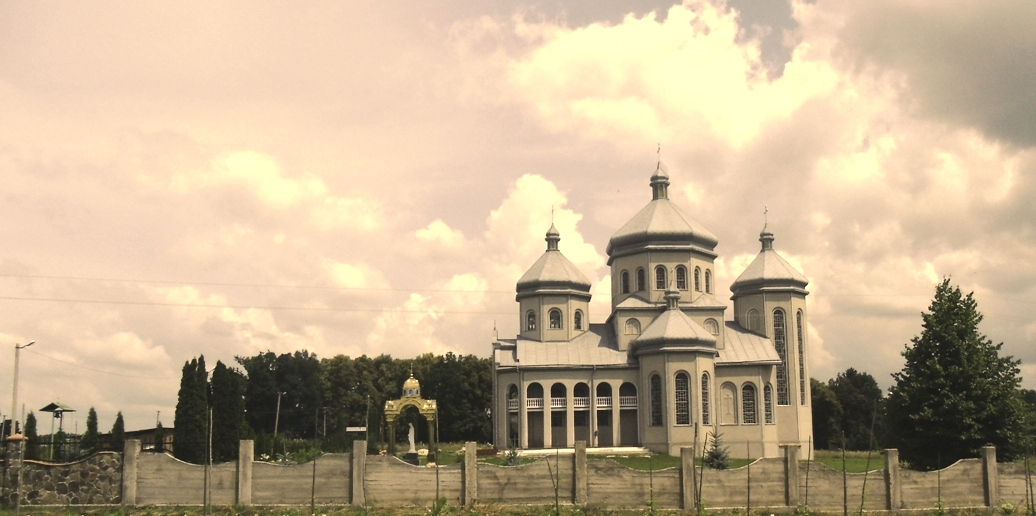
- The Church of St. Demetrius and of the Epiphany

- Location within Lviv Oblast
- Coordinates: 49°07′23″N 23°53′13″E
- Country: Ukraine
- Oblast: Lviv Oblast
- District: Stryi Raion
- Established: 1702

Area
  - Total: 185 km^{2} (71 sq mi)
- Elevation /(average value of): 346 m (1,135 ft)

Population
  - Total: 1,161
  - Density: 6,324/km^{2} (16,380/sq mi)
- Time zone: UTC+2 (EET)
  - Summer (DST): UTC+3 (EEST)
- Postal code: 82486
- Area code: +380 3245
- Website: село Лисовичі ^{(Ukrainian)}

Lysovychi (Ukrainian: Лисо́вичі) is a village in Stryi Raion, Lviv Oblast in western Ukraine. It belongs to Morshyn urban hromada, one of the hromadas of Ukraine. Local government is administered by Lysovytska village council.

== Geography ==
The village is located in the Carpathian Foothills and is located at a distance of 17 kilometres (11 mi) from the district center of Stryi along the road Highway H10 from Stryi to Chișinău and 88 kilometres (55 mi) from the regional center of Lviv, 84 kilometres (52 mi) from the regional center of Ivano-Frankivsk (administrative center of Ivano-Frankivsk Oblast).

== History ==
The first written mention dates back to year 1702. According to other sources Lysovychi were first mentioned in written sources in 1371. During the First World War, the village was the scene of fierce fighting, the ground was burned, crops destroyed.

== Monuments of architecture ==
The village has two sights of architecture Stryi district:

- Epiphany church (Bohoyavlenska tserkva) 1712 (525/1-М).
- Bell tower of Epiphany church (Dzvinytsya Bohoyavlenskoyi tserkvy) (19th century) (525/2-М).

== Personalities ==
- Boris Joseph Ivanovych — regional leader of the Stryj OUN in 1947–48.
- Bukshovanyy Osyp Ivanovych — May 29, 1915 he was wounded and was taken prisoner up to Russia.

== Literature ==
- (in Ukrainian) History of Towns and Villages of the Ukrainian SSR, Lvov region. – Київ : ГРУРЕ, 1968 р., 834 стор.
