= Dovhyi Voinyliv =

Rural locality in Ivano-Frankivsk Oblast, Ukraine

- Village
- Location of Dovhyi Voinyliv within Ukraine
- Coordinates: 49°9′N 24°22′E
- Country: Ukraine
- Oblast: Ivano-Frankivsk Oblast
- Raion: Kalush Raion

Dovhyi Voinyliv (Ukrainian: Довгий Войнилів, Polish: Dołha Wojniłowska) is a village in Kalush Raion, Ivano-Frankivsk Oblast, Ukraine. Before World War II the village was part of Kałusz county in Stanisławów Voivodship, Second Republic of Poland. Dovhyi Voinyliv belongs to Verkhnia rural hromada, one of the hromadas of Ukraine.

== World War II ==
During the wave of massacres of Poles in Volhynia between 1942 and 1945, Dołha Wojniłowska was one of hundreds of sites of mass murder of Polish civilians by OUN-UPA. On April 2, 1944 local Catholic priest, Rev. Błażej Czuba, was burned alive in his parish with 85 people. Soon after, on the first night of Easter, April 9–10, 1944, additional 64 people were massacred there during an OUN-UPA murderous raid overlooked by SS-Galizien. The attack was accompanied by the burning and razing of farmhouses, schools and churches.
