= Kalush Raion =

Subdivision of Ivano-Frankivsk Oblast, Ukraine

Kalush Raion Калуський район
- Raion
- Kaluskyi raion
- Flag Coat of arms

- Interactive map of Kalush Raion
- Coordinates: 49°3′39″N 24°23′15″E
- Country: Ukraine
- Oblast: Ivano-Frankivsk Oblast
- Established: 1939
- Admin. center: Kalush
- Subdivisions: 13 hromadas

Government
  - Head of the RDA: Zhanna Tabanets
  - Council Chairman: Mykhailo Lavriv

Area
  - Total: 3,550 km^{2} (1,370 sq mi)

Population (2022)
  - Total: 279,867
  - Density: 78.8/km^{2} (204/sq mi)
- Time zone: UTC+02:00 (EET)
  - Summer (DST): UTC+03:00 (EEST)
- Postal index: 77300—77363
- Area code: 380-3472

Kalush Raion (Ukrainian: Калуський район, romanized: Kalus'kyj rajon) is a raion (district) of Ivano-Frankivsk Oblast (province). The city of Kalush is the administrative center of the raion. Population: 279,867 (2022 estimate).

On 18 July 2020, as part of the administrative reform of Ukraine, the number of raions of Ivano-Frankivsk Oblast was reduced to six, and the area of Kalush Raion was significantly expanded. Two abolished raions, Dolyna and Rozhniativ Raions, as well as Bolekhiv Municipality and the city of Kalush, which was previously incorporated as a city of oblast significance and did not belong to the raion, were merged into Kalush Raion. The January 2020 estimate of the raion population was 57,409 (2020 est.).

The raion was formed on October 28, 1963. In 1972 part of the raion became incorporated into the Kalush municipality. The oldest settlements in the Raion are Stankiv (1158), Zaviy (13th century), Holyn' (1391), and Novytsia (14th century).

The leader of the Organization of Ukrainian Nationalists, Stepan Bandera, was born in Staryi Uhryniv in Kalush Raion, on January 1, 1909.

Nicholas Ilkov, Ivan Rubchak and the writer M. Kozonis were also born in Kalush Raion.

== Subdivisions ==
=== Current ===
After the reform in July 2020, the raion consisted of 13 hromadas:

- Bolekhiv urban hromada with the administration in the city of Bolekhiv, transferred from Bolekhiv Municipality;
- Broshniv-Osada settlement hromada with the administration in the rural settlement of Broshniv-Osada, transferred from Rozhniativ Raion;
- Dolyna urban hromada with the administration in the city of Dolyna, transferred from Dolyna Raion;
- Duba rural hromada with the administration in the selo of Duba, transferred from Rozhniativ Raion;
- Kalush urban hromada with the administration in the city of Kalush, transferred from the city of oblast significance of Kalush;
- Novytsia rural hromada with the administration in the selo of Novytsia, retained from Kalush Raion;
- Perehinske settlement hromada with the administration in the rural settlement of Perehinske, transferred from Rozhniativ Raion;
- Rozhniativ settlement hromada with the administration in the rural settlement of Rozhniativ, transferred from Rozhniativ Raion;
- Spas rural hromada with the administration in the selo of Spas, transferred from Rozhniativ Raion;
- Verkhnia rural hromada with the administration in the selo of Verkhnia, retained from Kalush Raion;
- Voinyliv settlement hromada with the administration in the rural settlement of Voinyliv, retained from Kalush Raion;
- Vyhoda settlement hromada with the administration in the rural settlement of Vyhoda, transferred from Dolyna Raion;
- Vytvytsia rural hromada with the administration in the selo of Vytvytsia, transferred from Dolyna Raion.

=== Before 2020 ===
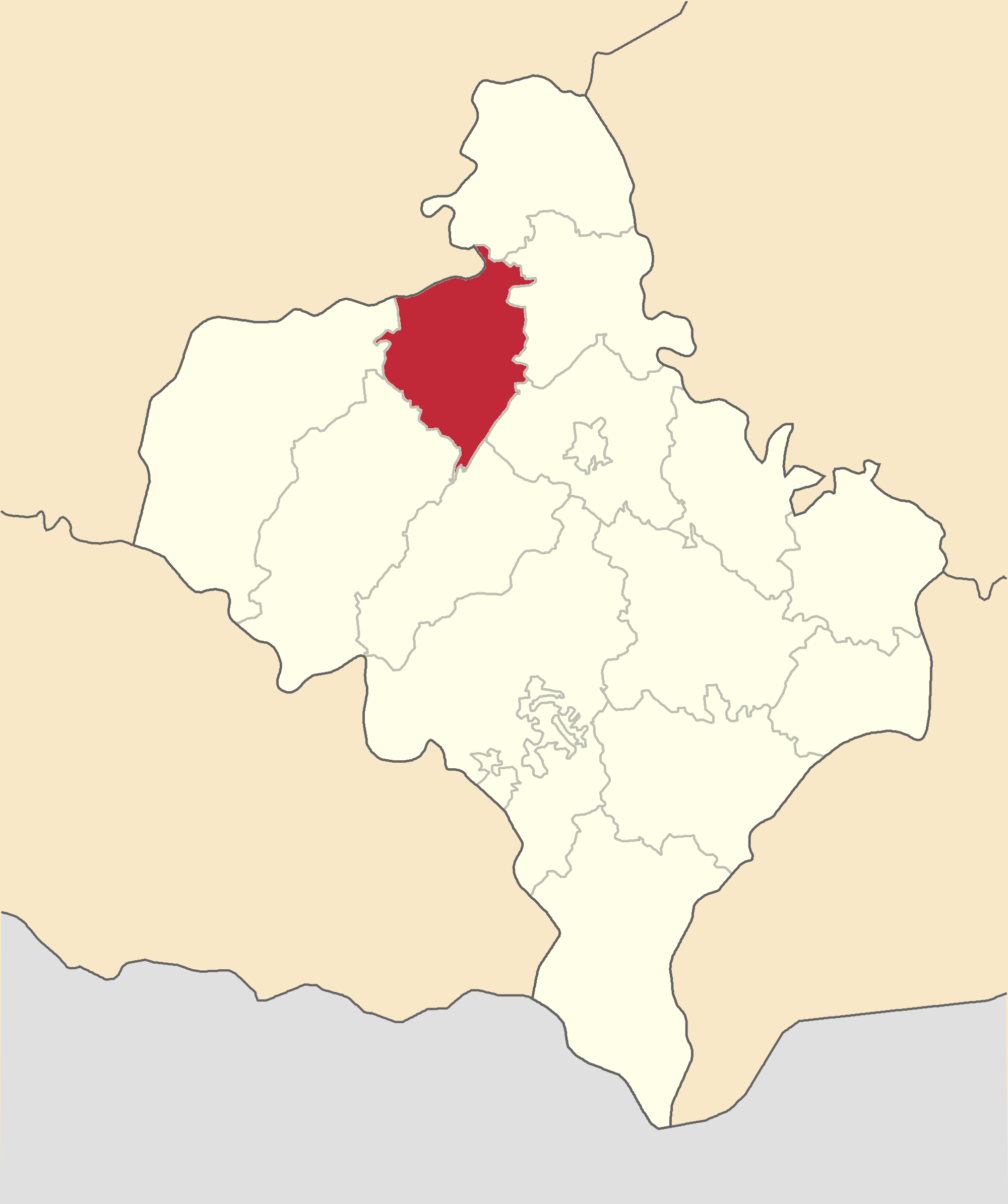
Kalush Raion in Ivano-Frankivsk Oblast (1966-2020)

Before the 2020 reform, the raion consisted of three hromadas:

- Novytsia rural hromada with the administration in Novytsia;
- Verkhnia rural hromada with the administration in Verkhnia;
- Voinyliv settlement hromada with the administration in Voinyliv.
