= Ostrov =

Ostrov means "island" in several Slavic languages and in Romanian. It may refer to:

== Places ==
=== Czech Republic ===
- Ostrov (Benešov District), a municipality and village in the Central Bohemian Region
- Ostrov (Chrudim District), a municipality and village in the Pardubice Region
- Ostrov (Havlíčkův Brod District), a municipality and village in the Vysočina Region
- Ostrov (Karlovy Vary District), a town in the Karlovy Vary Region
- Ostrov (Příbram District), a municipality and village in the Central Bohemian Region
- Ostrov (Ústí nad Orlicí District), a municipality and village in the Pardubice Region
- Ostrov, a village and part of Bor (Tachov District) in the Plzeň Region
- Ostrov, a village and part of Malšín in the South Bohemian Region
- Ostrov, a village and part of Mutěnín in the Plzeň Region
- Ostrov, a village and part of Ouběnice in the Central Bohemian Region
- Ostrov, a village and part of Prachatice in the South Bohemian Region
- Ostrov, a village and part of Třebnouševes in the Hradec Králové Region
- Ostrov, a village and part of Úmyslovice in the Central Bohemian Region
- Ostrov, a village and part of Zbraslavice in the Central Bohemian Region
- Ostrov, a village and part of Žďárec in the South Moravian Region
- Ostrov nad Oslavou, a market town in the Vysočina Region
- Ostrov u Bezdružic, a municipality and village in the Plzeň Region
- Ostrov u Macochy, a market town in the South Moravian Region
- Ostrov u Stříbra, a village and part of Kostelec (Tachov District) in the Plzeň Region

=== Romania ===
- Ostrov, Constanța, a commune in Constanţa County
- Ostrov, Tulcea, a commune in Tulcea County
- Ostrov, a village in Birchiș Commune, Arad County
- Ostrov, a village in Râu de Mori Commune, Hunedoara County
- Ostrov, a village in Osica de Sus Commune, Olt County

=== Russia ===
- Ostrov, Russia; several inhabited localities
- Ostrov, Ostrovsky District, Pskov Oblast
- Ostrov (air base), an air base in Pskov Oblast

=== Slovakia ===
- Ostrov, Sobrance, a village
- Ostrov, Piešťany, a village

== Other uses ==
- Ostrov, or The Island (2006 film), a Russian film
- Ostrovat, or The Island (2011 film), a Bulgarian film

== See also ==
- Ostriv (disambiguation) (Ukrainian form)
- Ostrów (disambiguation) (Polish form)
- Ostrovo (disambiguation)
- Ostrowo (disambiguation)
- Ostrau (disambiguation) (Germanized form)
- Ostroff
