= Ostriv =

Ostriv (Ukrainian: Острів, lit. 'island') may refer to:

== Arts and entertainment ==
- Ostriv (video game)

== Places ==
=== Ukraine ===
Chernihiv Oblast

- Ostriv, Nizhyn Raion

Ivano-Frankivsk Oblast

- Ostriv, Ivano-Frankivsk Raion

Khmelnytskyi Oblast

- Chornyi Ostriv (Khmelnytskyi Oblast), Khmelnytskyi Raion

Kyiv Oblast

- Ostriv, Bila Tserkva Raion

Lviv Oblast

- Ostriv, Chervonohrad Raion
- Ostriv, Sambir Raion
- Ostriv, Stryi Raion
- Ostriv, Zolochiv Raion, Lviv Oblast
- Chornyi Ostriv (Lviv Oblast), Zhydachiv Raion

Riven Oblast

- Ostriv, Volodymyrets Raion
- Ostriv, Dubno Raion
- Ostriv, Radyvyliv Raion

Ternopil Oblast

- Ostriv, Ternopil Raion

Volyn Oblast

- Ostriv, Kivertsivskyi Raion

Zhytomyr Oblast

- Ostriv, Ovruch Raion

== See also ==
- Ostrov (disambiguation)
- Ostrów (disambiguation) (Polish form)
- Ostrowo (disambiguation)
- Ostrowiec (disambiguation)
- Ostrau (disambiguation) (German form)
