= Bohdan Pylypiv =

Ukrainian pyrography artist (born 1954)

- Богдан Іванович Пилипів
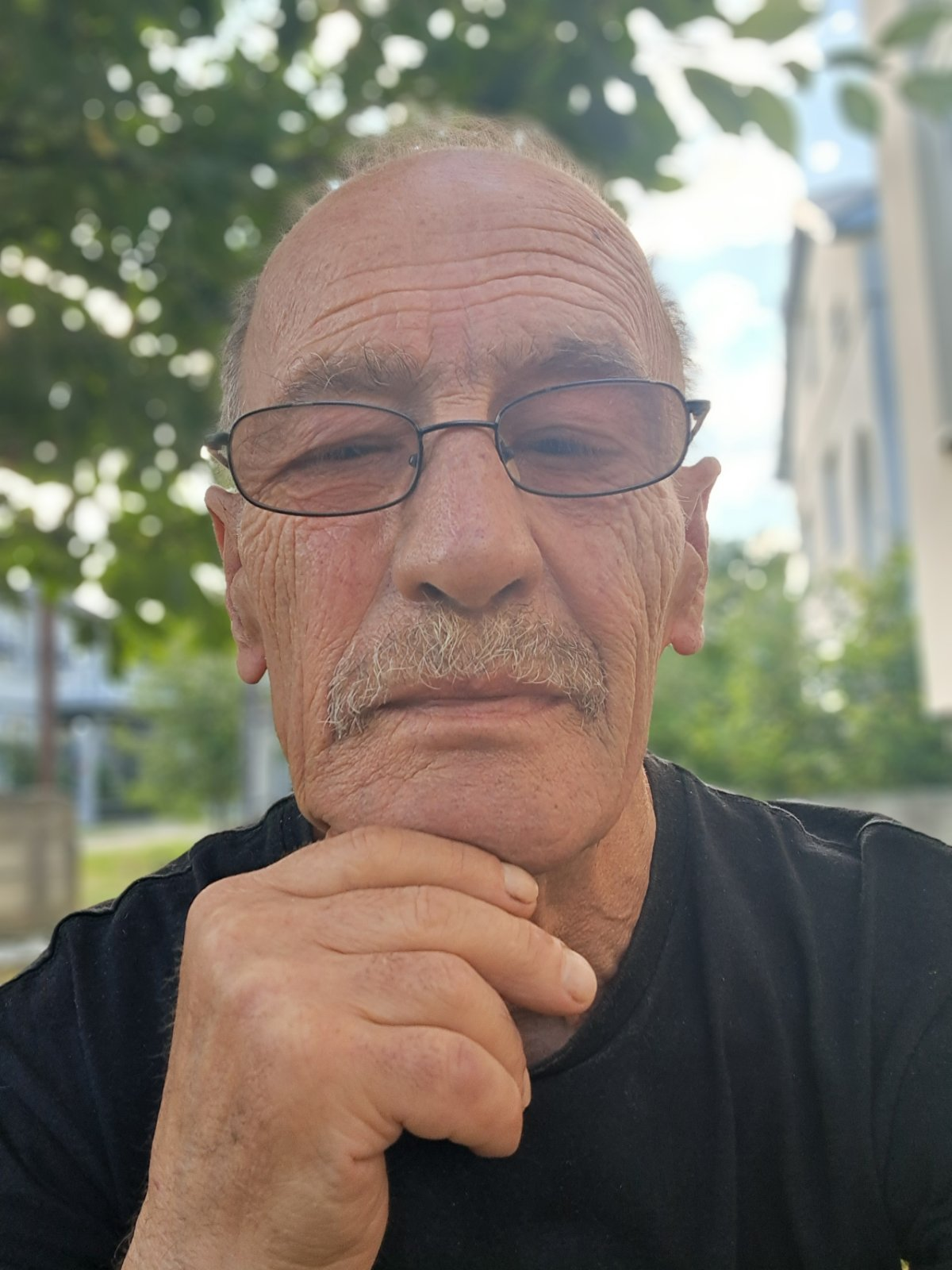
- Born: 14 October 1954 (age 71); Ilemnia (now Ivano-Frankivsk Oblast, Ukraine)
- Education: University of Lviv, Ivan Fedorov Lviv Polygraphic Institute
- Occupation: Pyrography artist

Bohdan Pylypiv (Ukrainian: Богдан Іванович Пилипів; born 14 October 1954) is a Ukrainian pyrography artist. Member of the National Union of Journalists of Ukraine.

== Biography ==
Bohdan Pylypiv was born on 14 October 1954 in Ilemnia (now Vyhoda Hromada, Kalush Raion, Ivano-Frankivsk Oblast, Ukraine).

He graduated from the Faculty of Journalism at the University of Lviv. As a student, he became more deeply interested in book graphics and art in general. He attended lectures by Professor Khrystyna-Olena Sanotska at the Ivan Fedorov Lviv Polygraphic Institute. He studied painting with the coryphaeus of Ukrainian painting Volodymyr Patyk.

In 1995, he worked in Jena (Germany) as a restorer of artworks for a collector of works. During 2003–2005 he was a member of the editorial board, deputy editor-in-chief of the Christian magazine "Verso La Luce" ("To the Light") of the Apostolic Visitation of Ukrainian Catholics in Italy. He is the compiler and illustrator of the unique two-volume Anthology of the work of migrant workers "Light on Other People's Paths" (Rome, 2005). He currently lives and works in Rozhniativ.

== Creativity ==
He works with the unique in the world, painstaking and jewelry technique of "fire graphics" on wooden planes (pyrography). He mastered and perfected the technique on his own, experimenting and bringing it to perfection. Thanks to the author's technique, his works are visually perceived as multidimensional, creating the effect of three-dimensional space. He also creates icons, graphics, paintings (some of them made with paint) and portraits. Participant of regional exhibitions in Ivano-Frankivsk. Personal exhibitions were held in Lviv, Warsaw (2013).

After his son Andrii was seriously injured at the front and lost his life (1982–2023), the artist Bohdan Pylypiv launched a series of charity exhibitions in Europe. The first vernissage was held in Paris, with proceeds going to support soldiers who lost their limbs. Later, his works were presented in six cities in Germany.

On 15 May 2025, the head of the UGCC, Sviatoslav Shevchuk, during an audience with the newly elected Pope Leo XIV, presented him with a painting by Bohdan Pylypiv entitled "War. Preghiera di Requiem".

Among the artist's works:

- copies of works by masters of world renown (Raphael, Mastroianni, Leonardo da Vinci, Sebastiano Conca);
- portraits of Taras Shevchenko, Symon Petliura, Hero of Ukraine Vasyl Slipak, His Beatitudes Liubomyr Huzar and Sviatoslav Shevchuk, Pope John Paul II, Boris Johnson, Andrzej Duda, Justin Trudeau, Joe Biden, Emmanuel Macron, Emperor Naruhito of Japan, King Salman bin Abdulaziz Al Saud of Saudi Arabia, Queen Elizabeth II of Great Britain, Princess Diana, Angelina Jolie, La Gioconda, Donald Trump.

Some of his works are kept in private collections in the United States, Canada, Israel, Poland, Italy, Germany, and Ukraine.

== Gallery ==
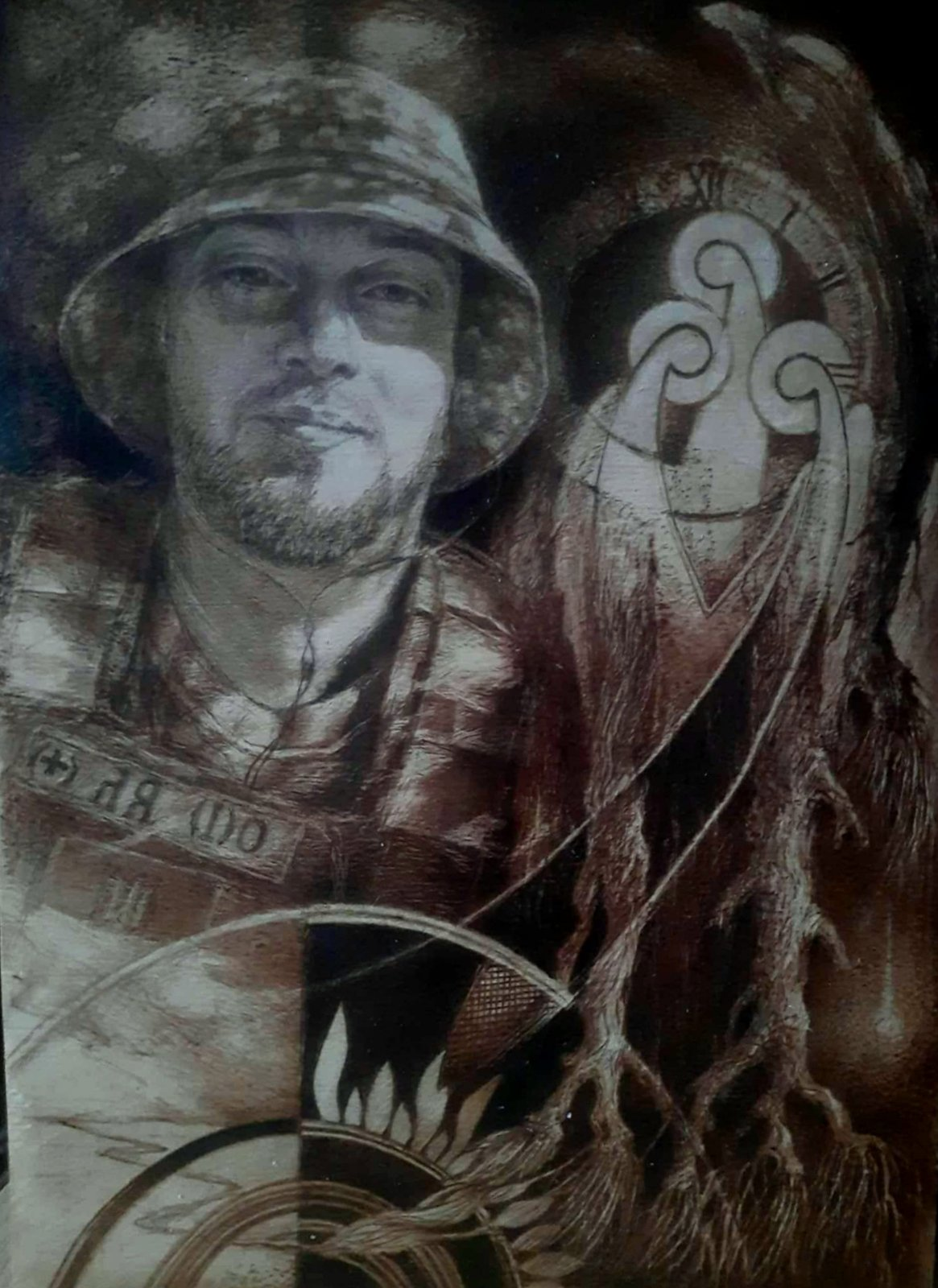
Try anhely Andriika, 2024

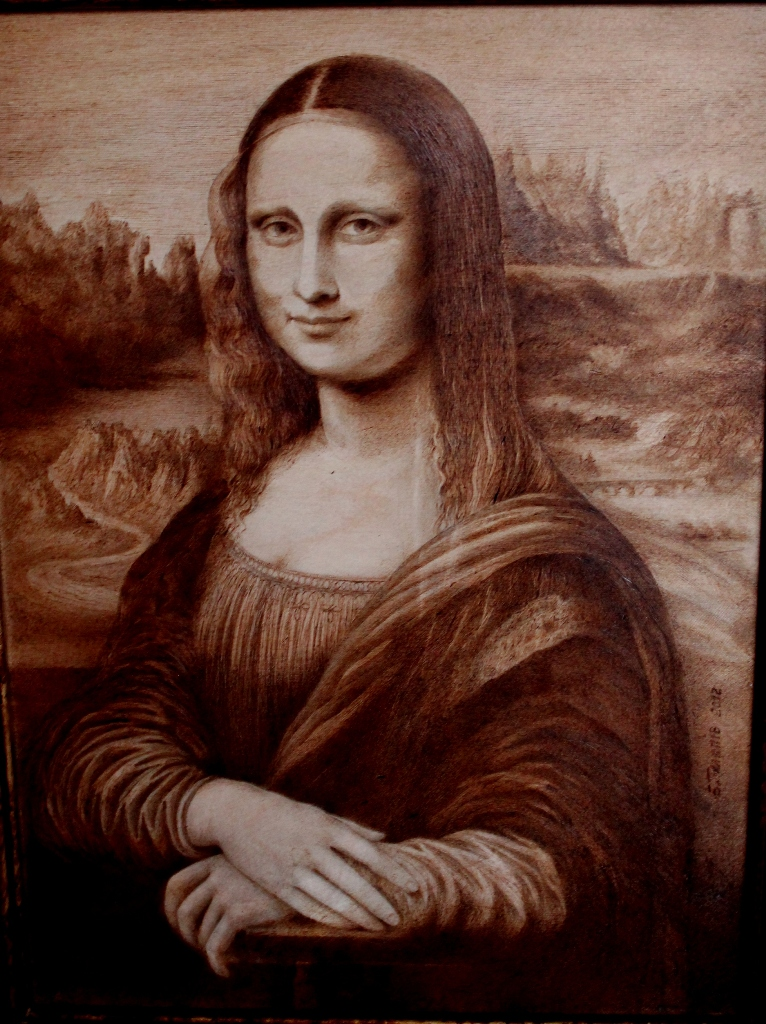
La Gioconda (Mona Lisa), 2014

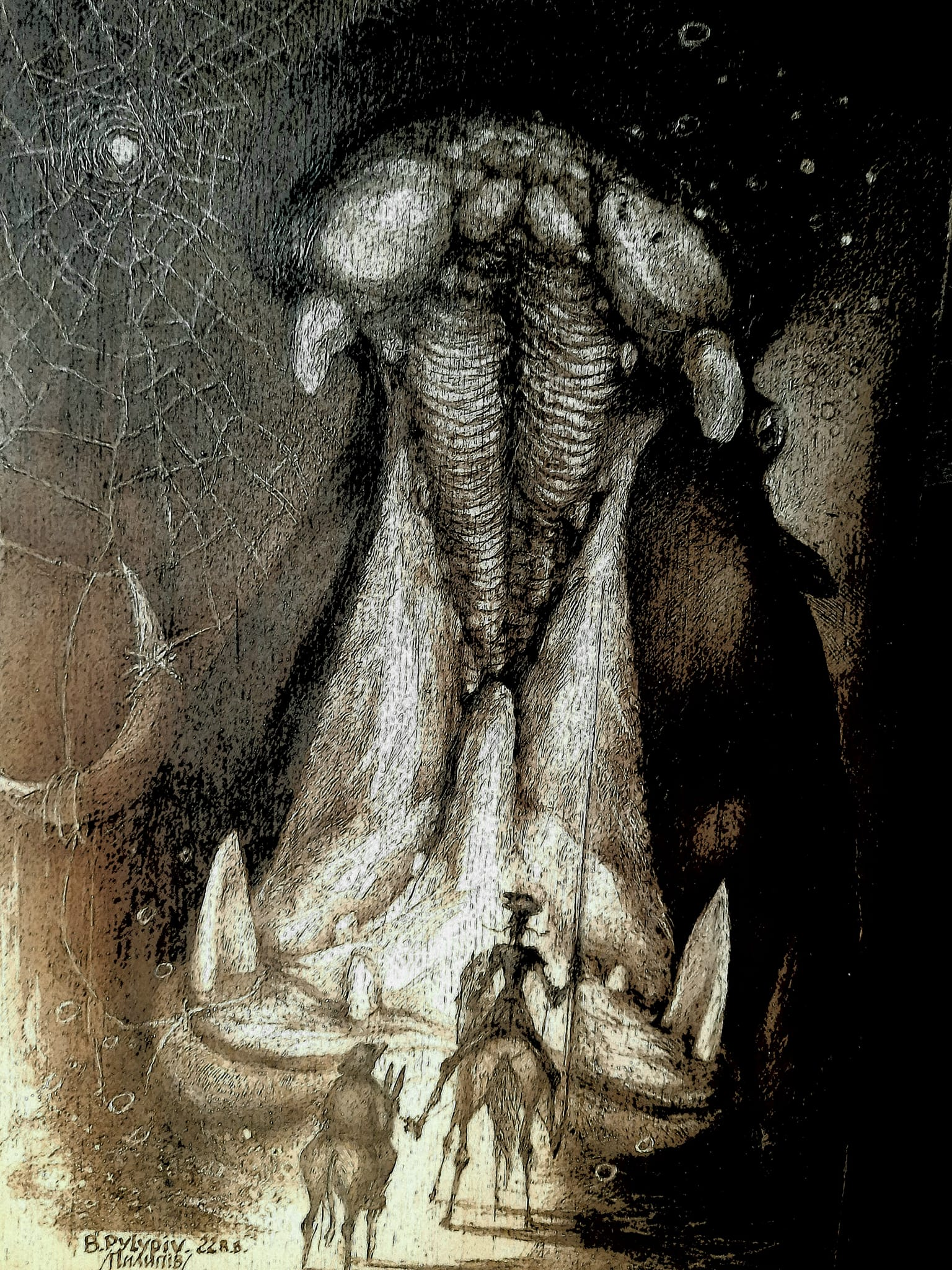
Don Quixote and the hippo, 2022

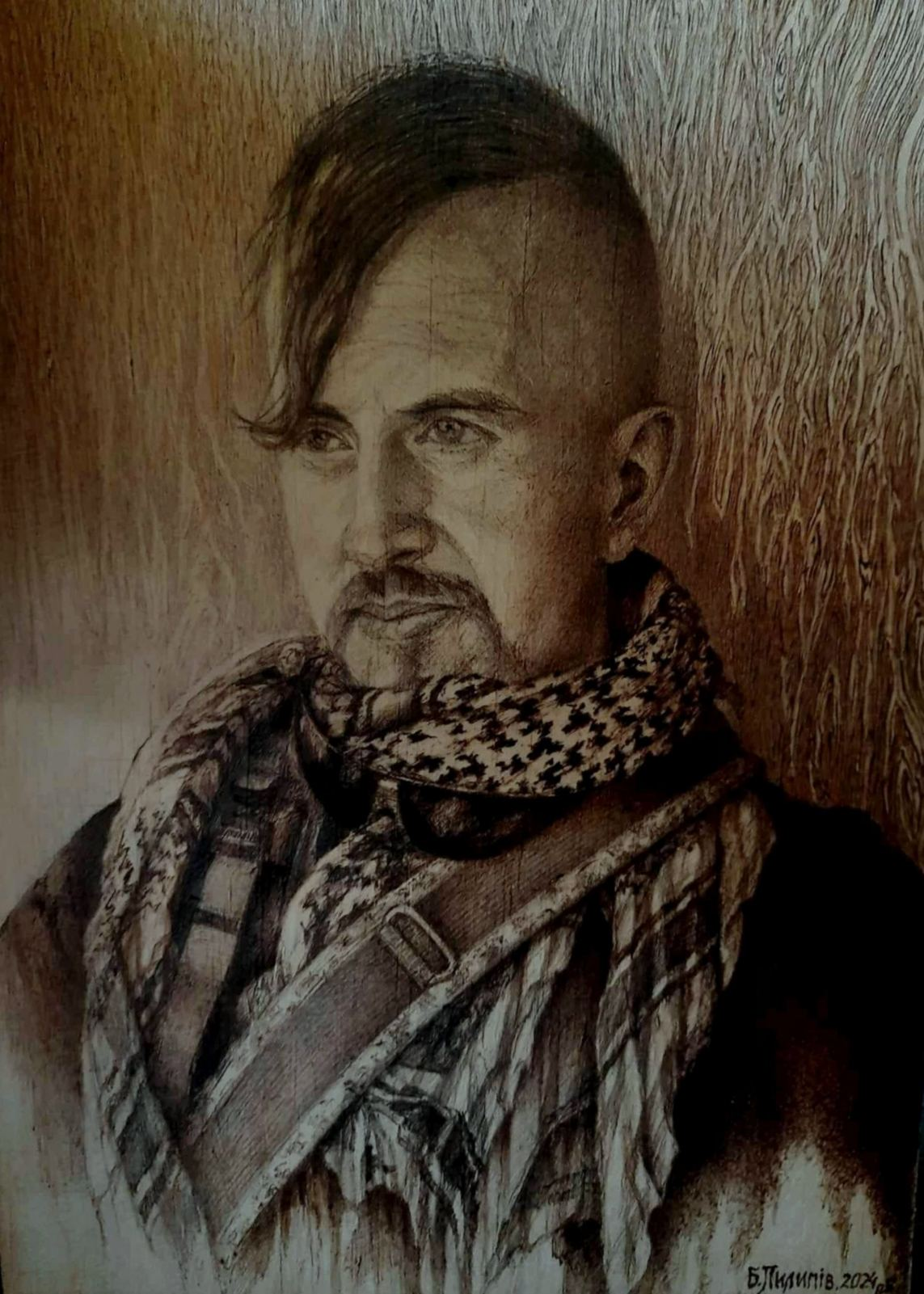
Hero of Ukraine, Soloist of the Paris Opera – Vasyl Slipak, 2024

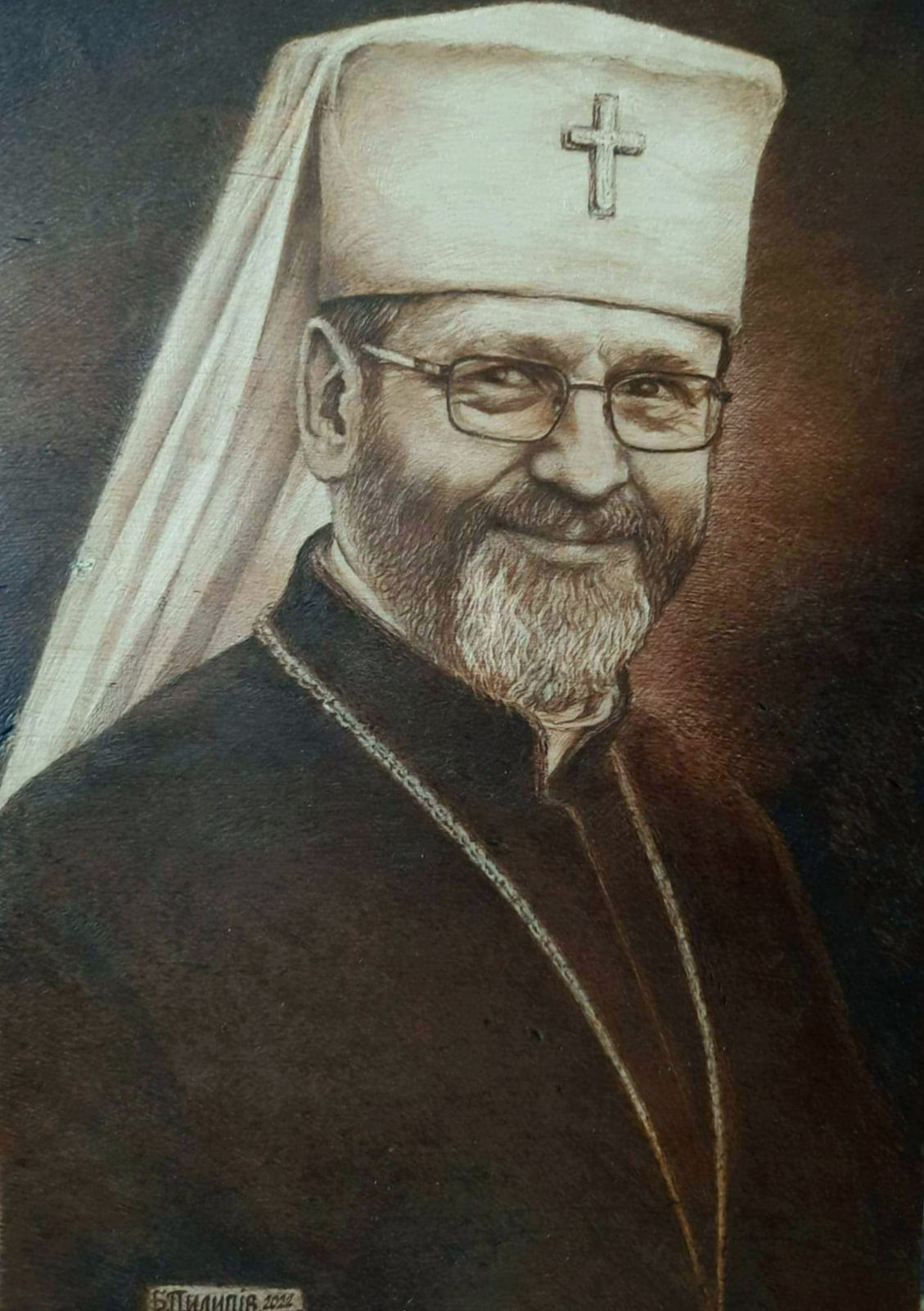
Patriarch, Head of the UGCC His Beatitude Sviatoslav Shevchuk, 2022

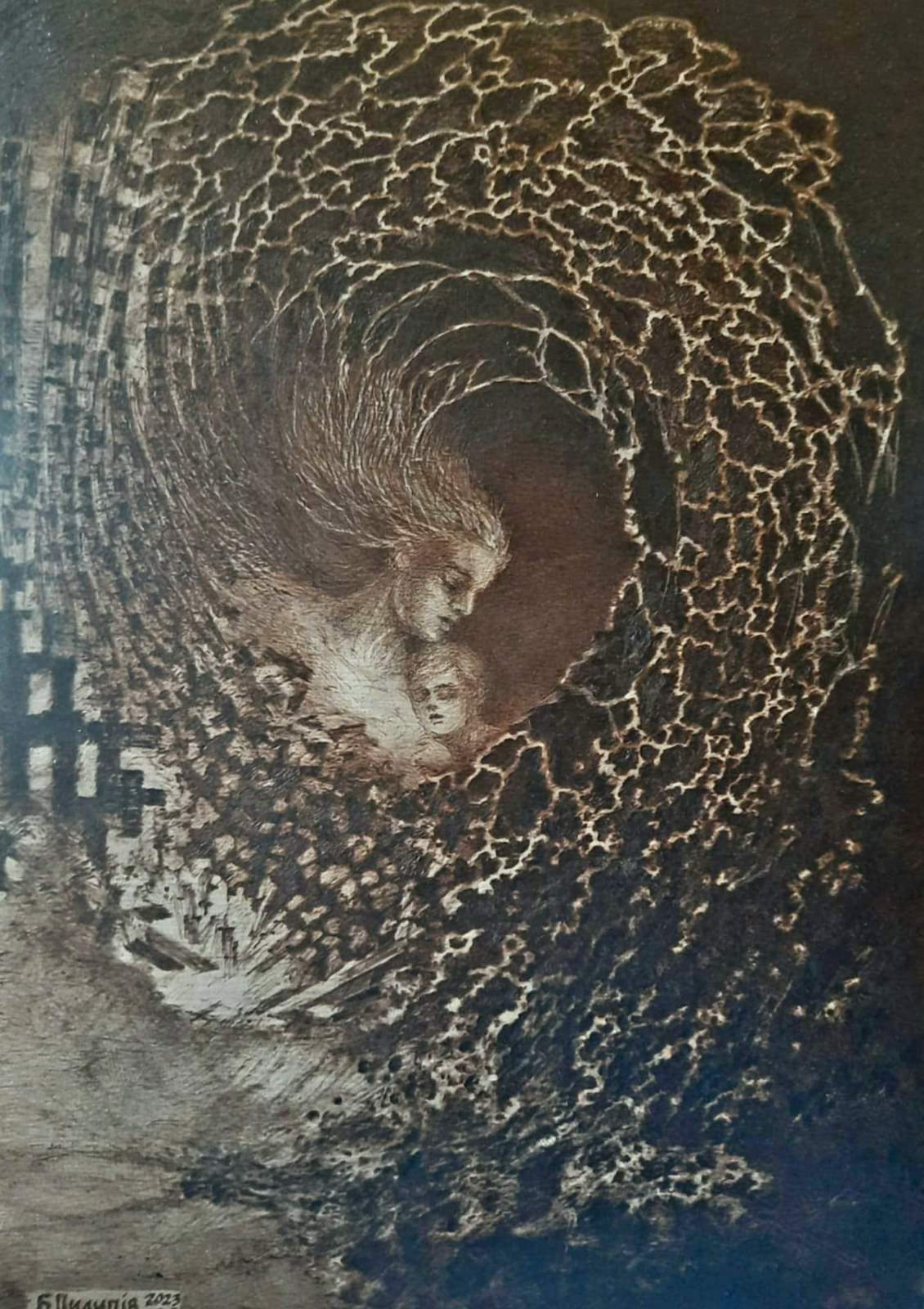
U hornyli viiny, 2023

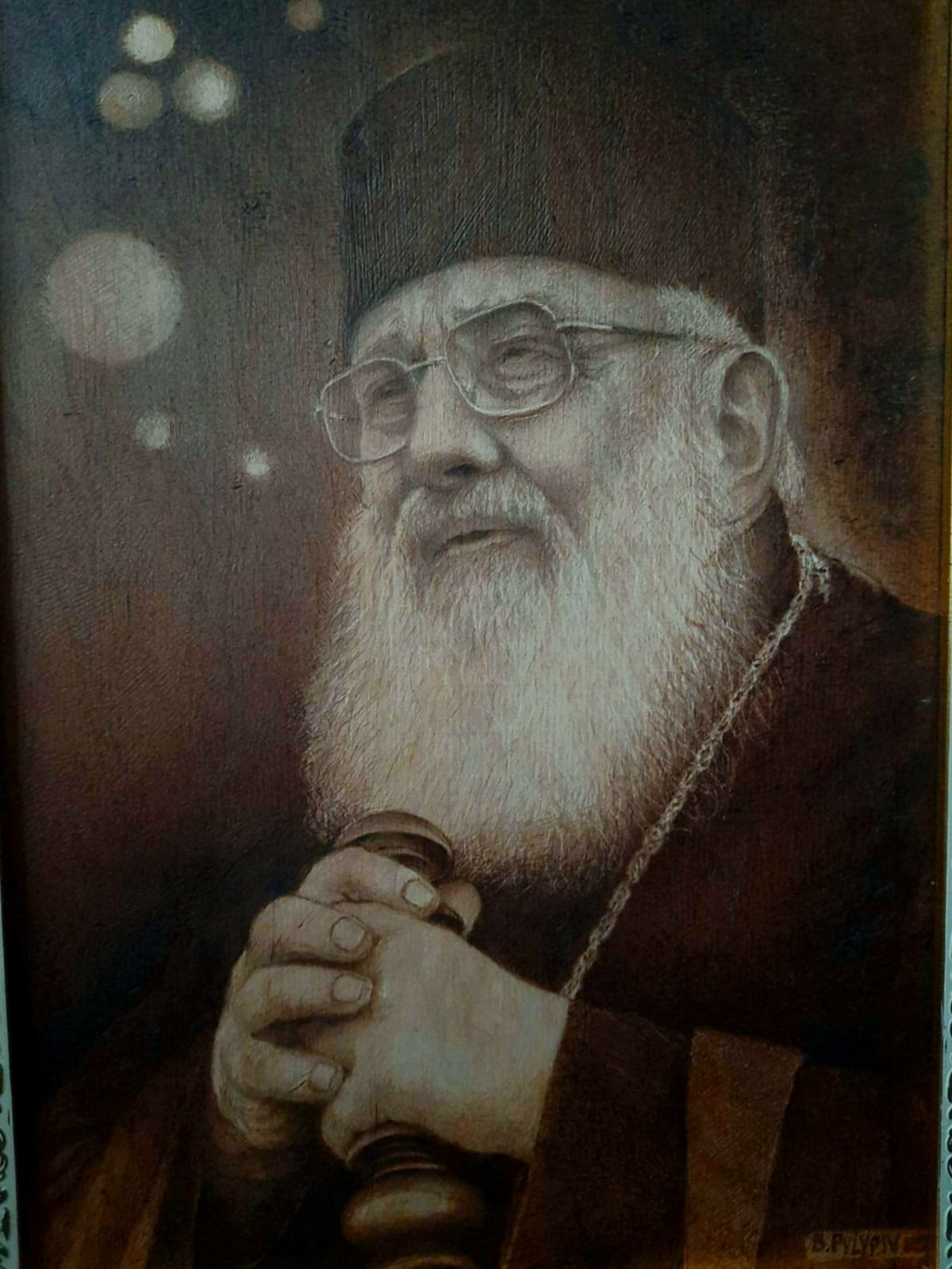
Patriarch Cardinal Lubomyr Husar is the pride and conscience of Ukraine

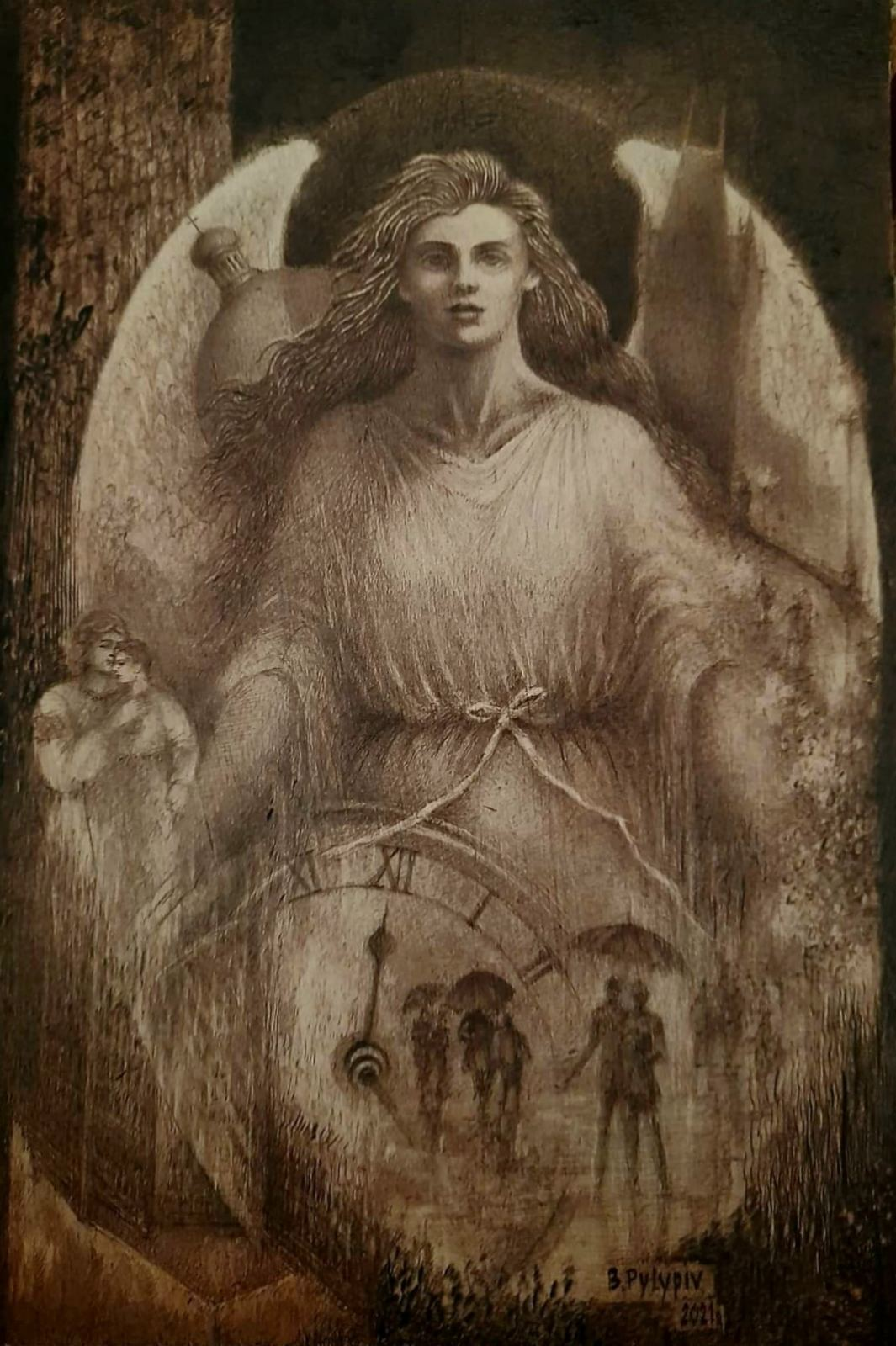
Pid pokrovom Anhela-okhorontsia, 2021

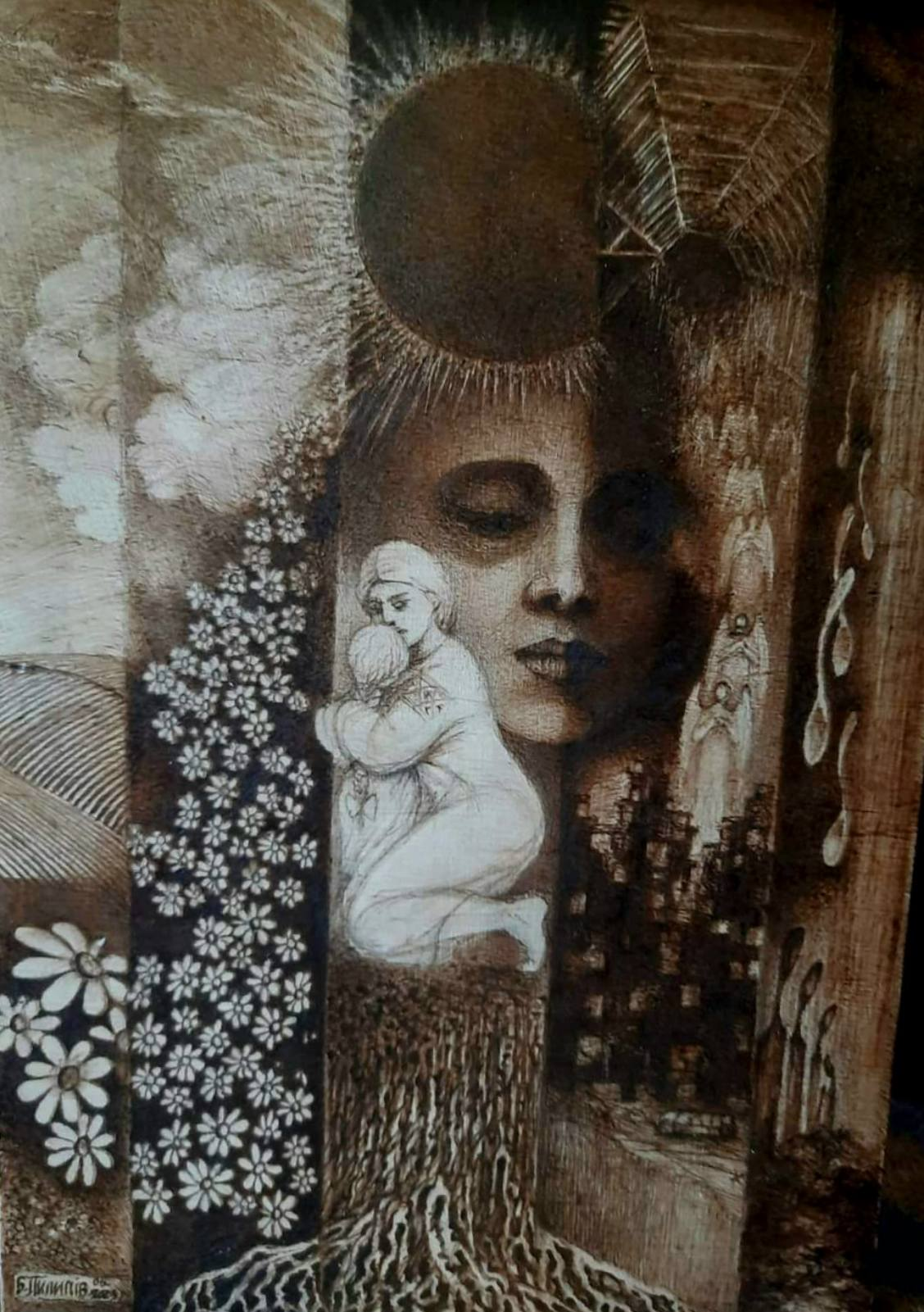
Obnimy mene, mamo. Vidzheny chornu nich, 2023

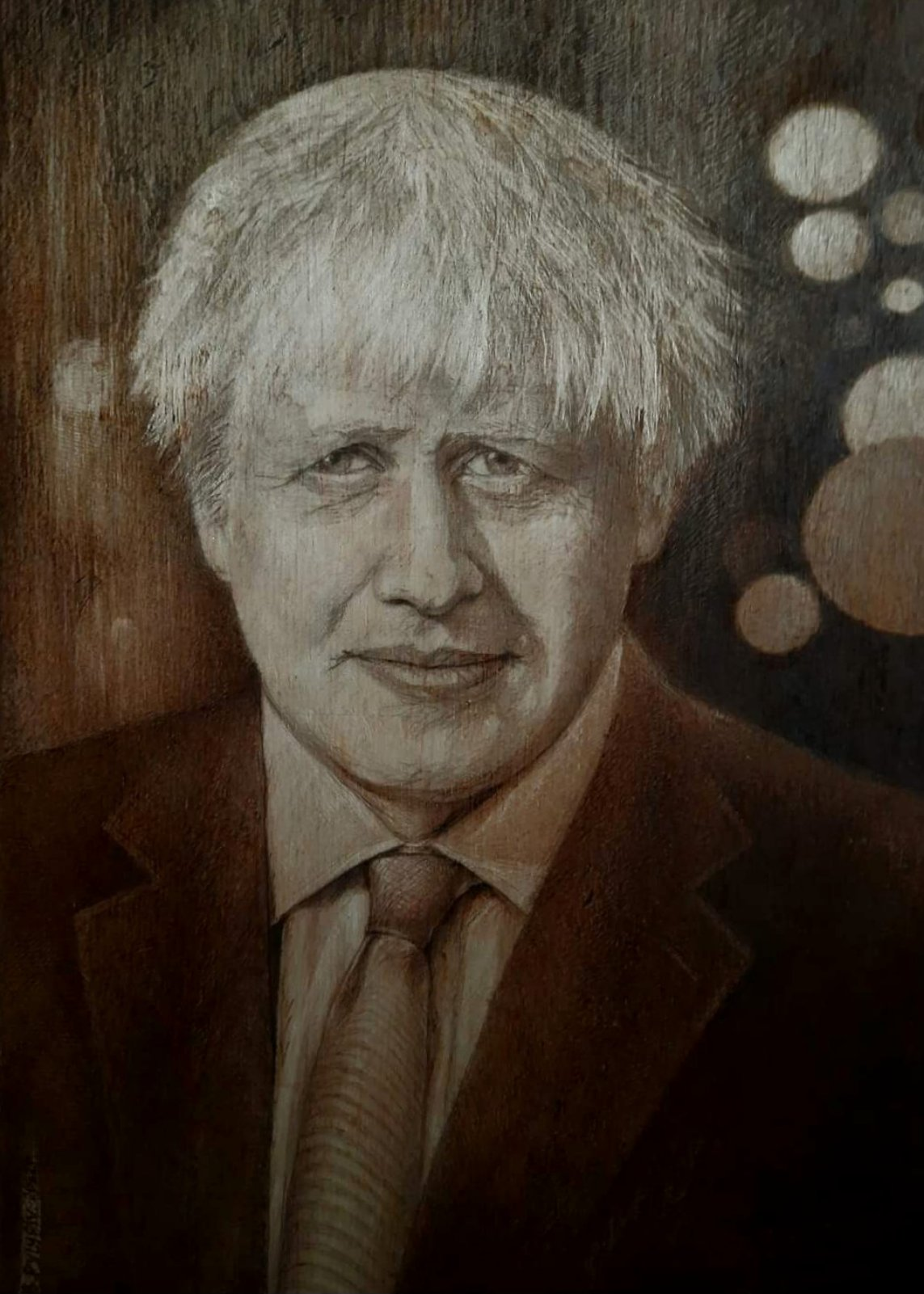
Boris Johnson, 2022

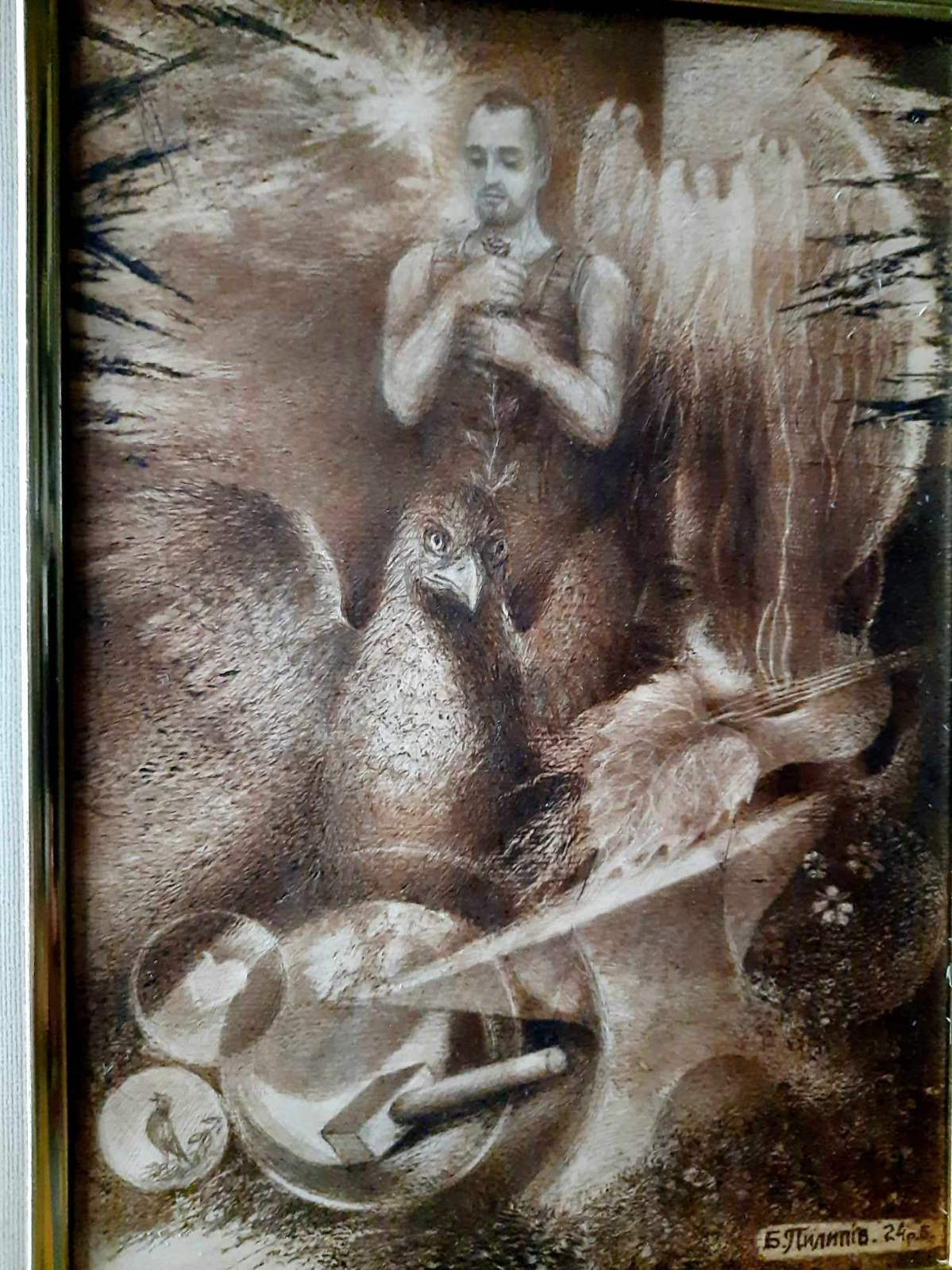
Shliakh u vichnist. Tsina zhertovnosti. Syn Andrii, 2024

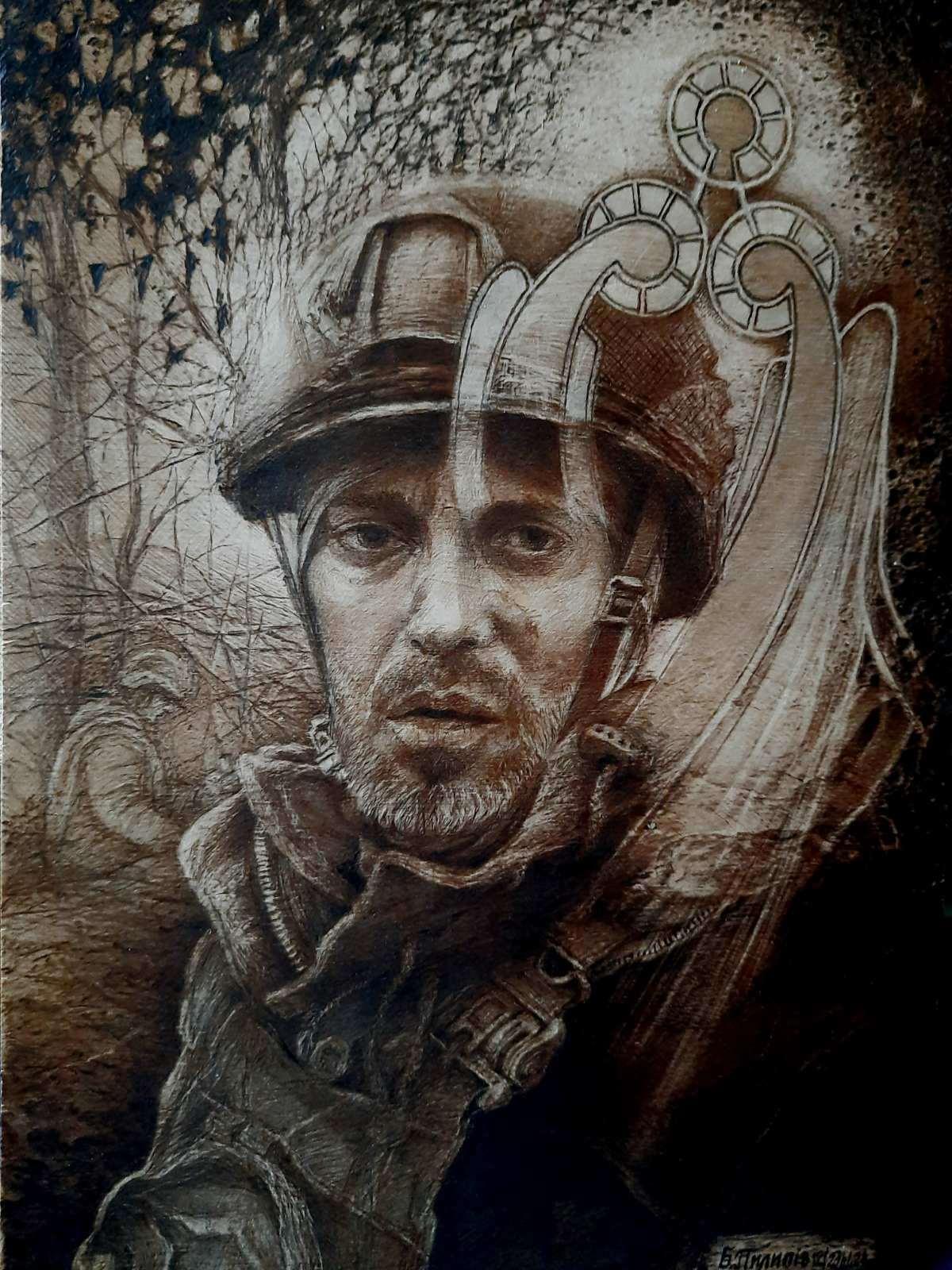
Our brave Falcon. A view from ZERO, 2023—2024

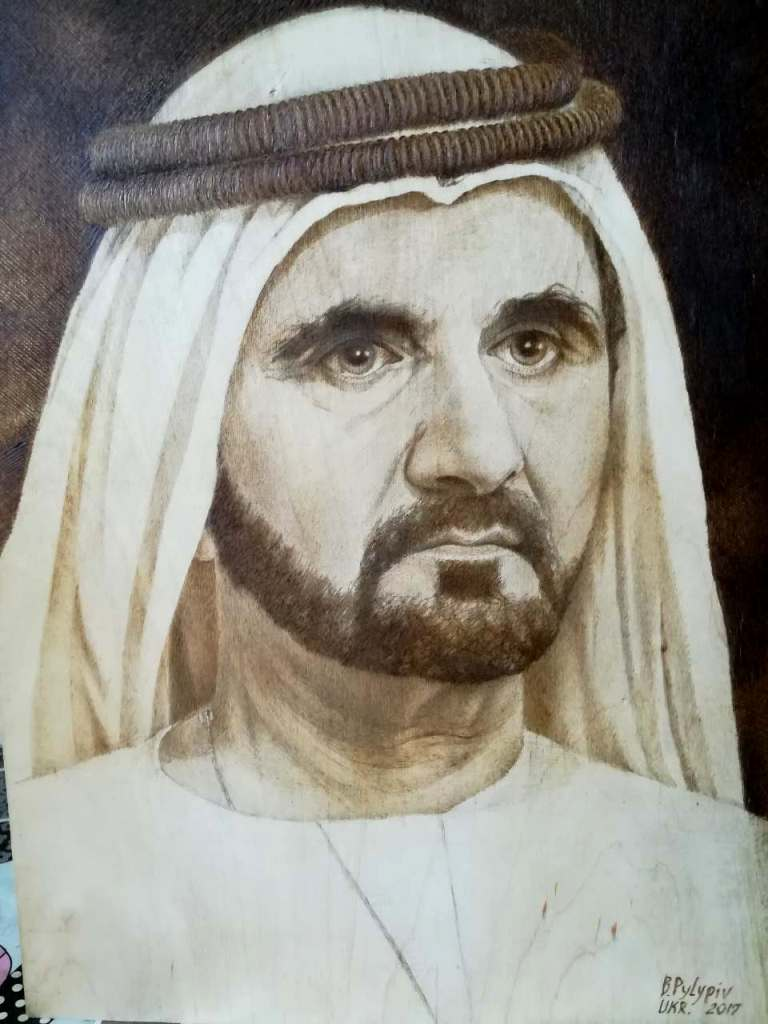
Premier Minister ZEA Mohammed bin Rashid Al Maktoum, 2017

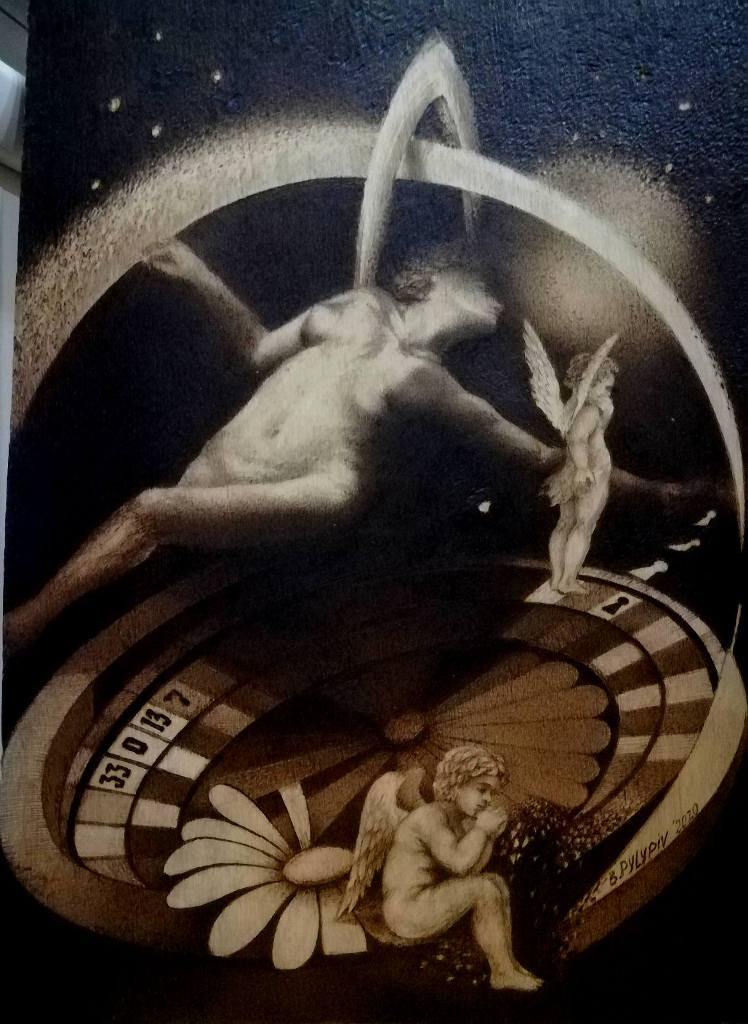
Ruletka, 2020

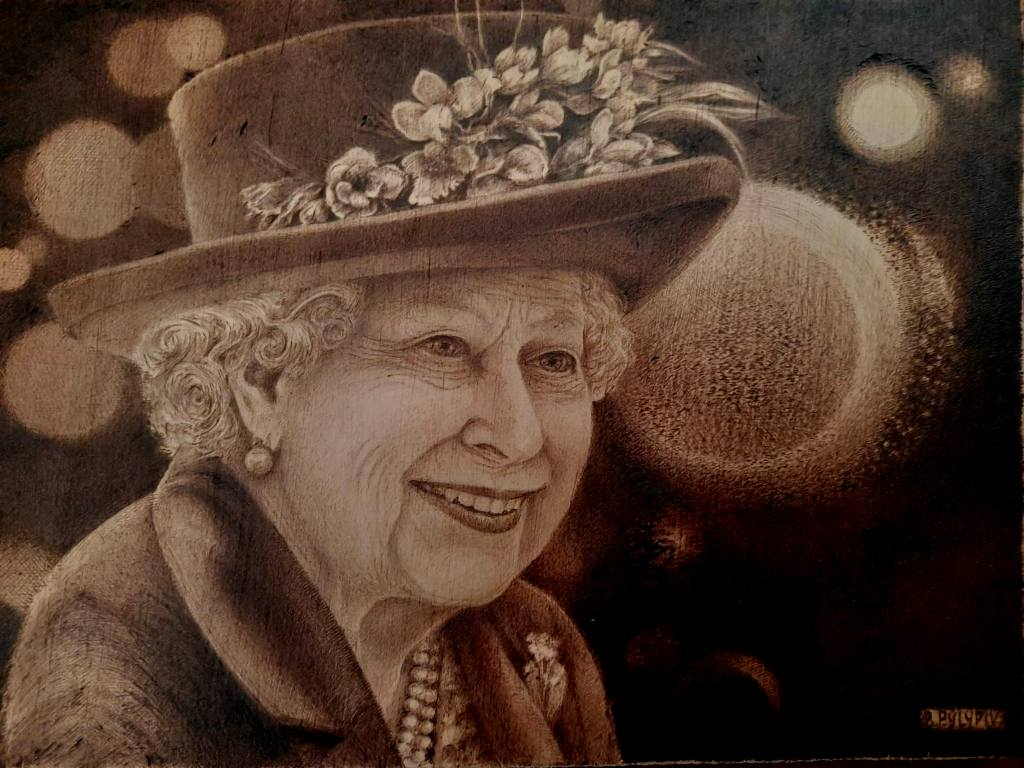
Queen Elizabeth II of Great Britain, 2020

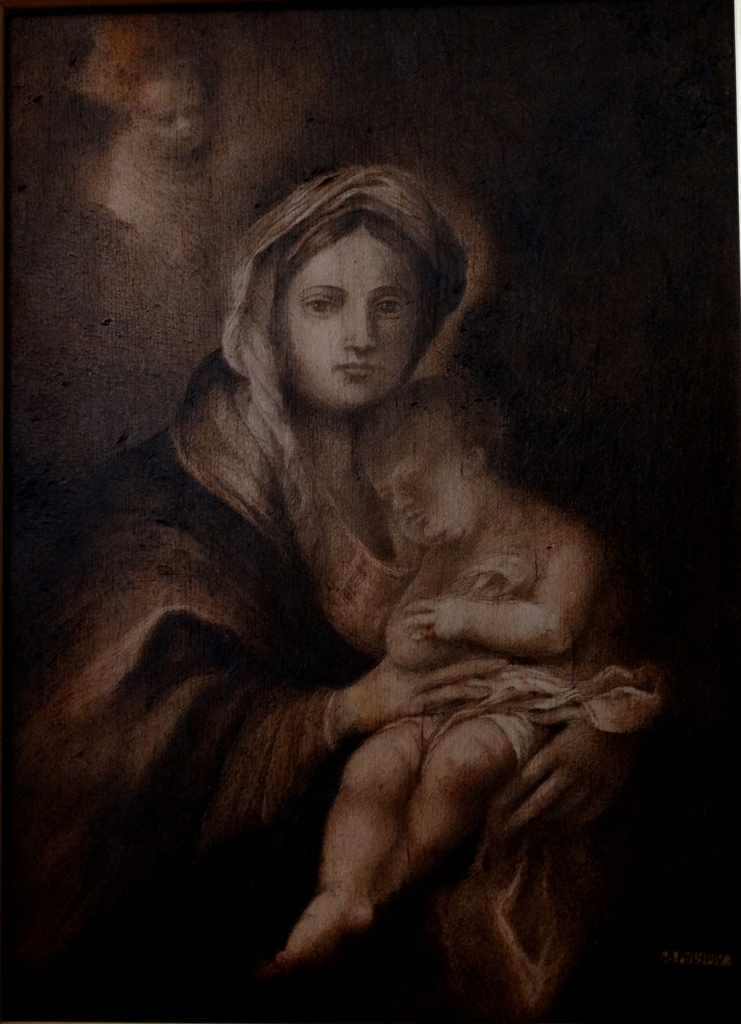
Madonna z dytiam, shcho spyt, 2018

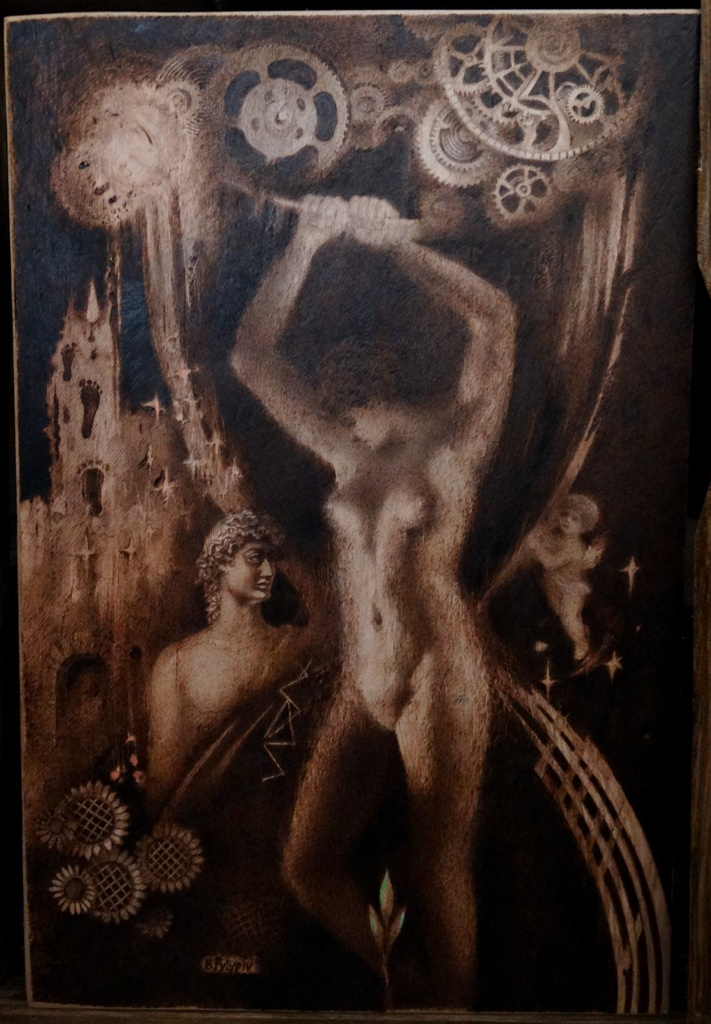
Novyi chas (Nowy czas), 2019

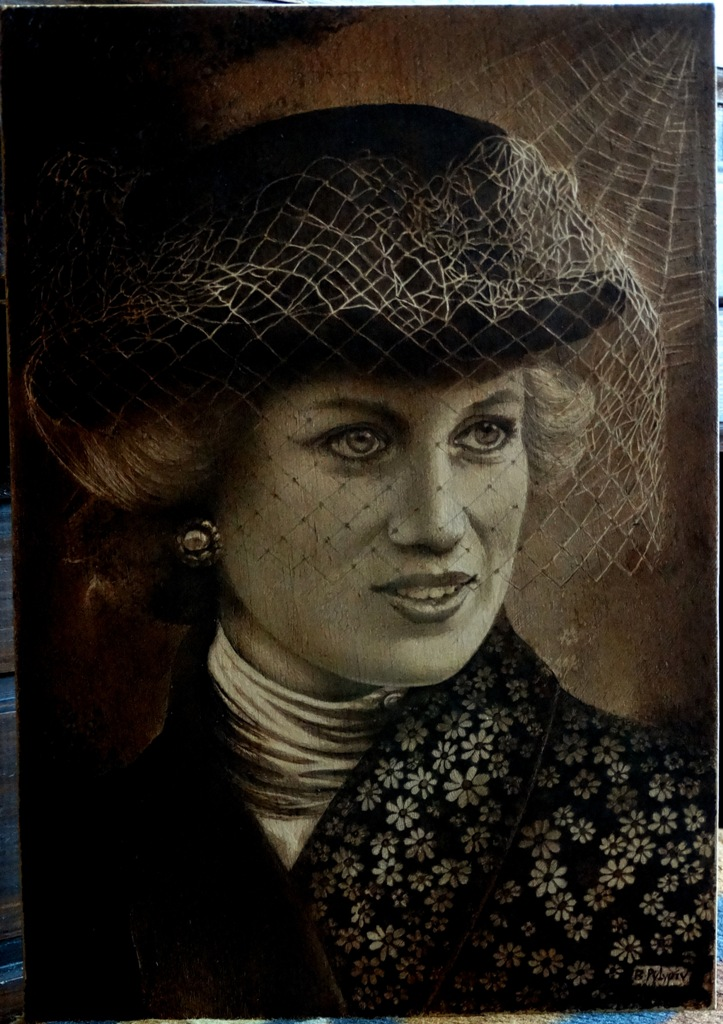
Diana, Princess of Wales, 2018

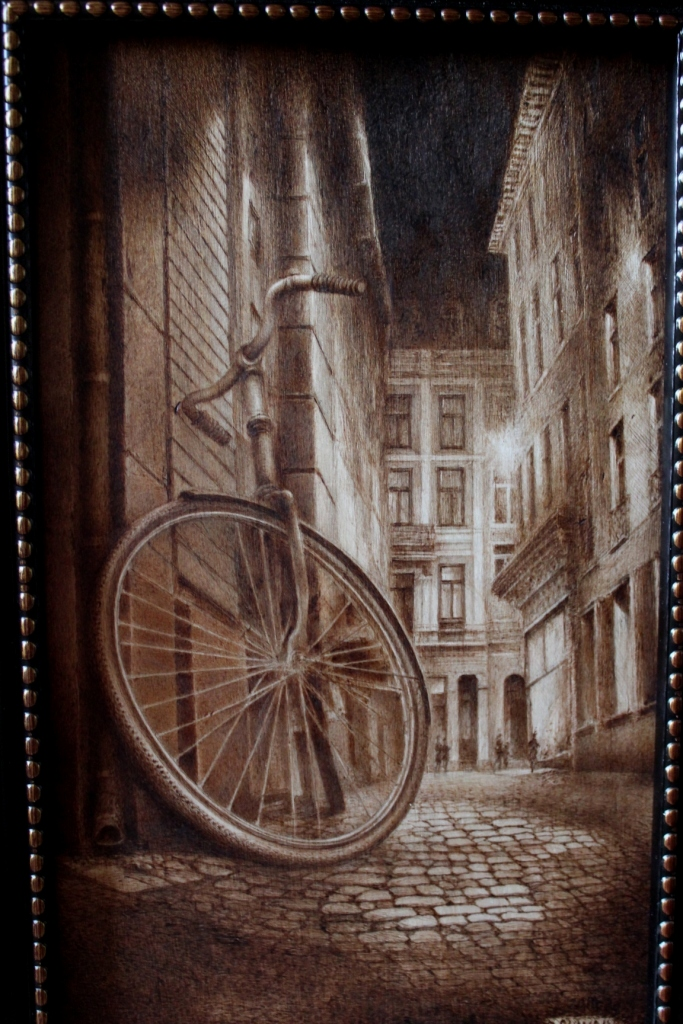
Kraków. A street at night, 2018

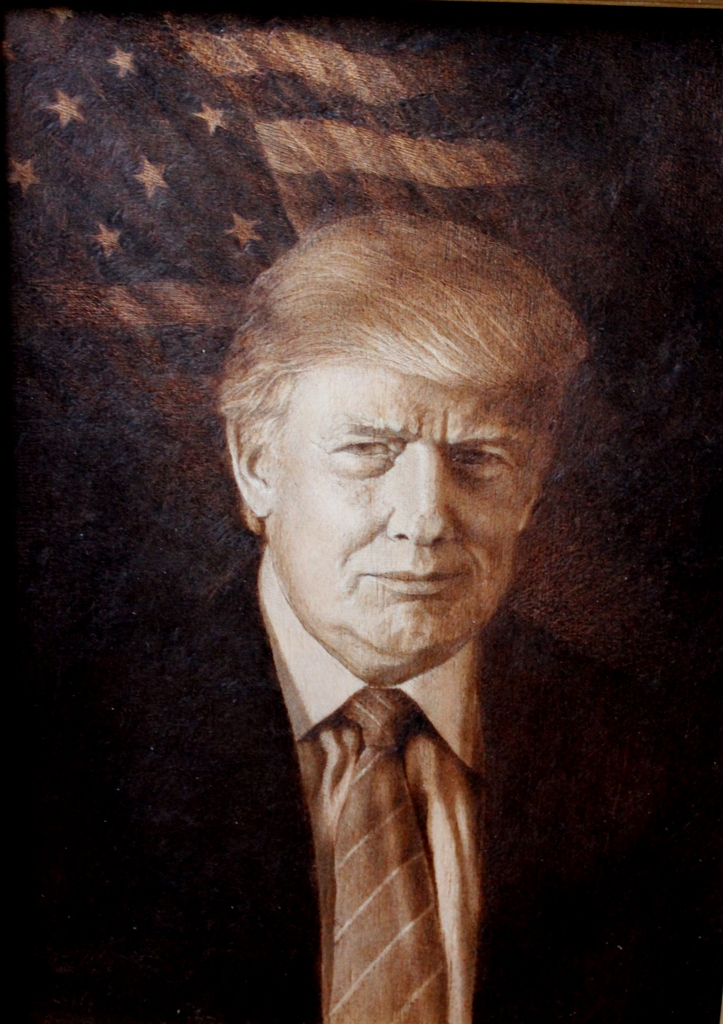
U.S. President Donald Trump, 2018

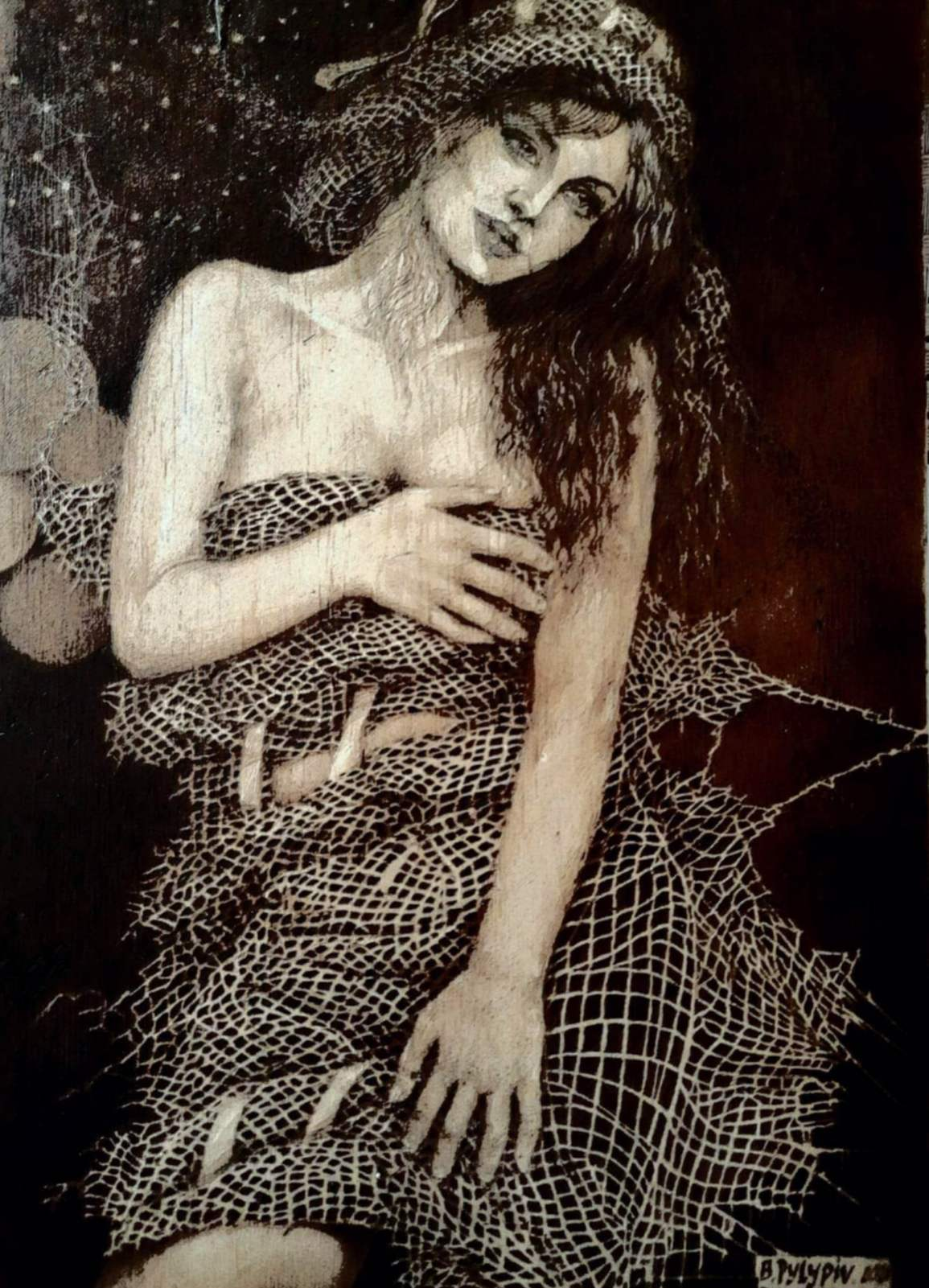
Angelina Jolie, 2021

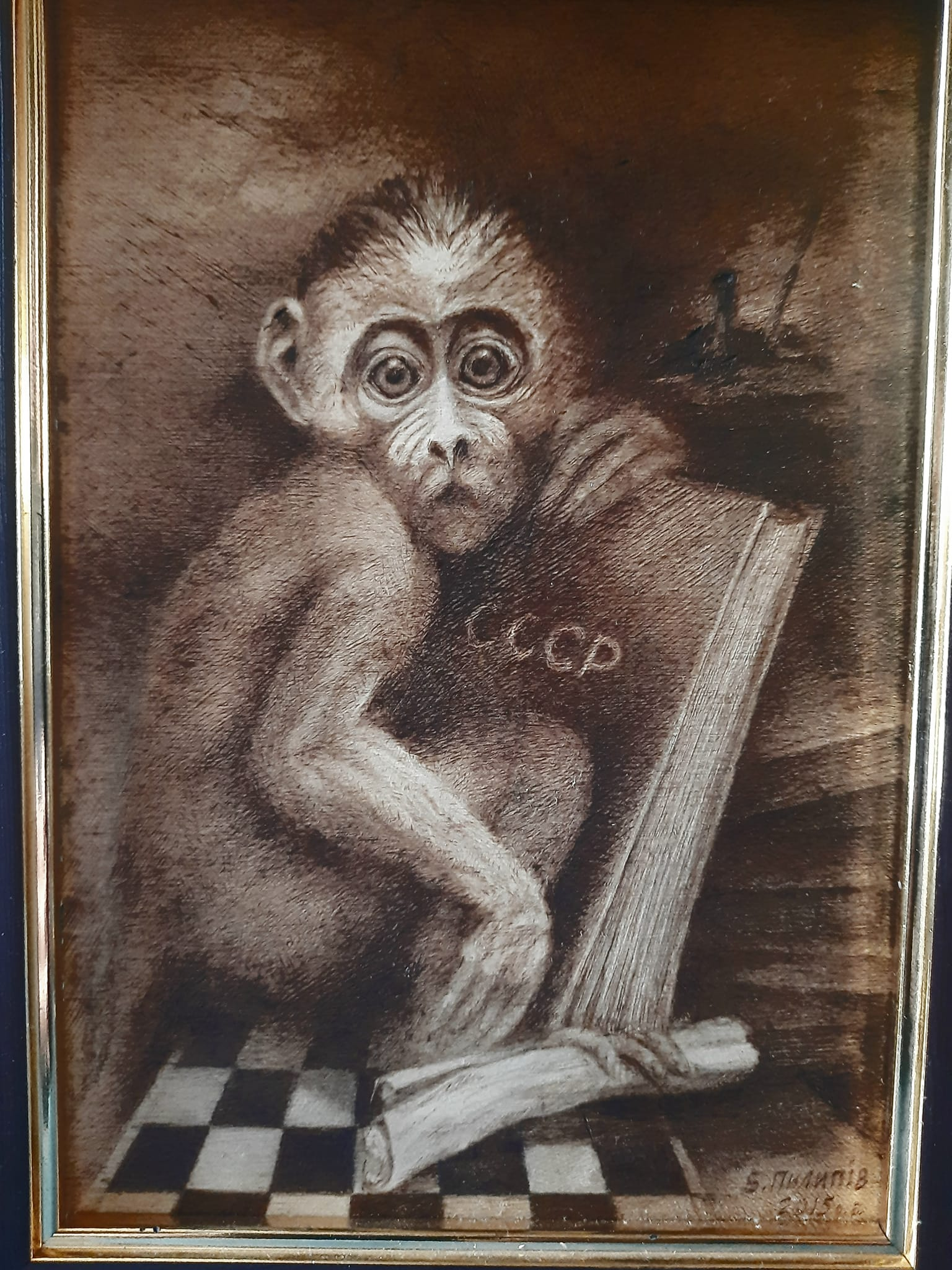
Monkey with a grenade, 2015

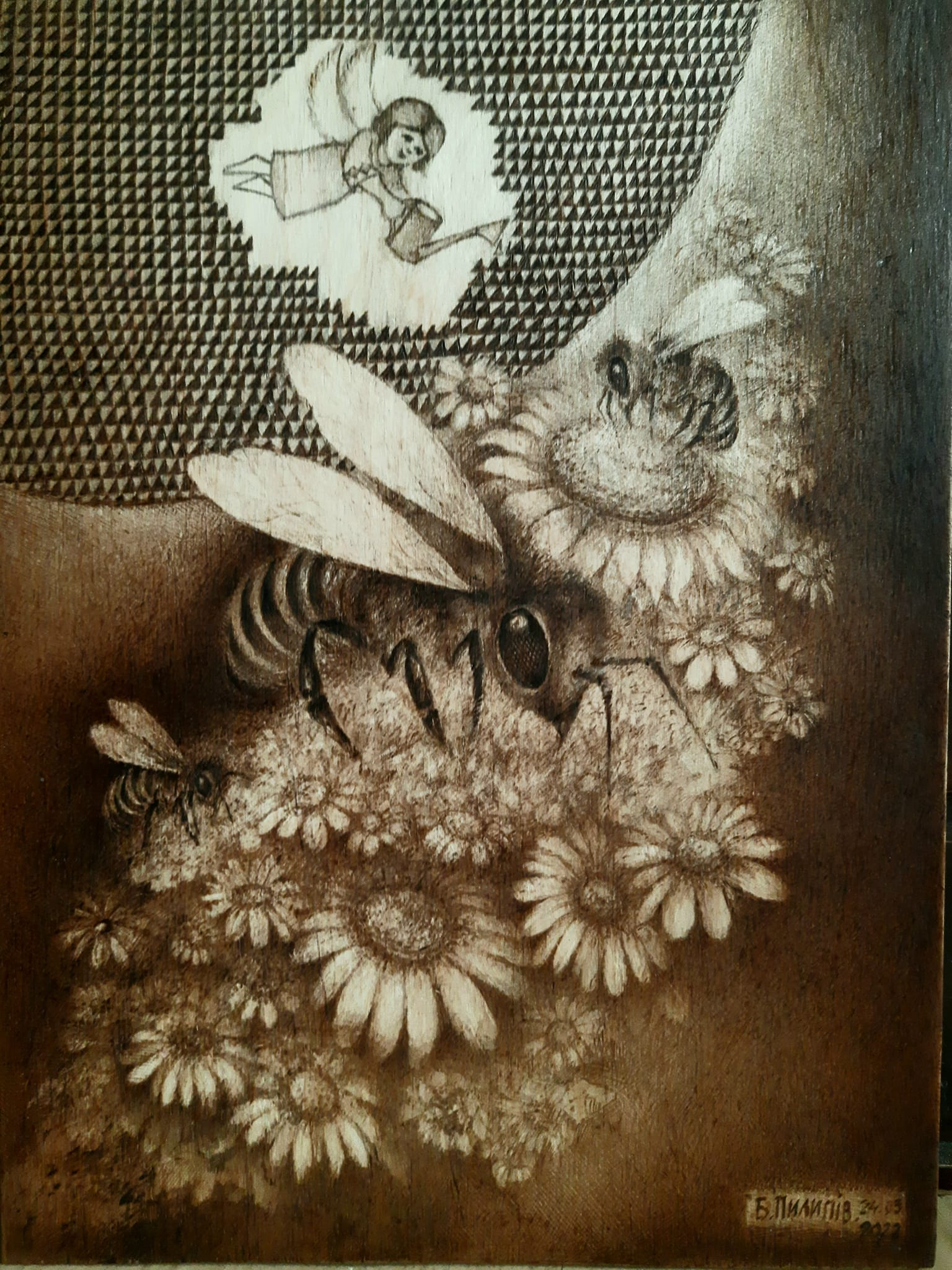
Koly movchat harmaty, 2022

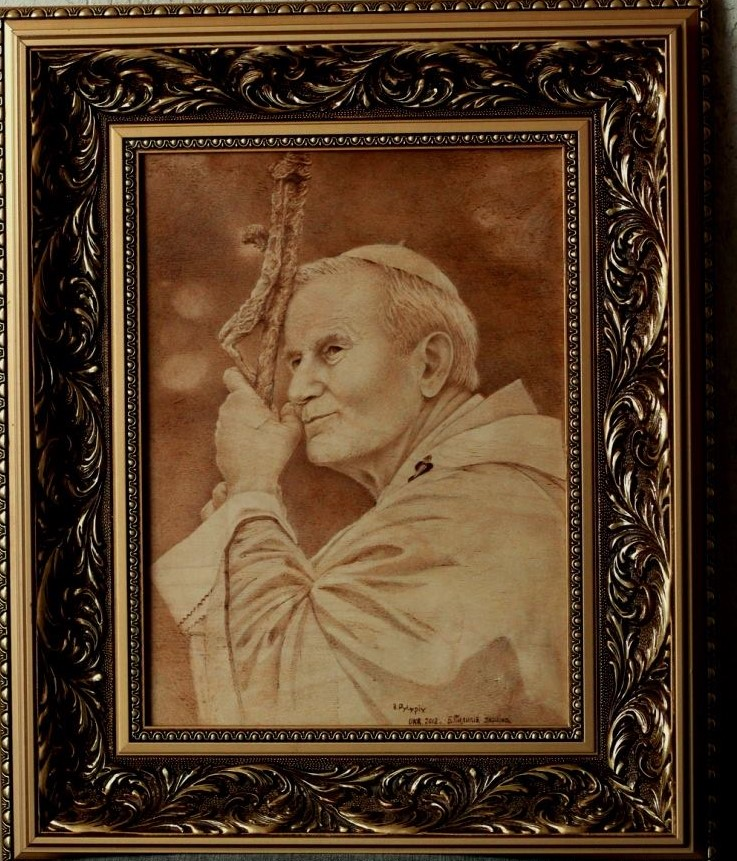
Pope John Paul II, 2018

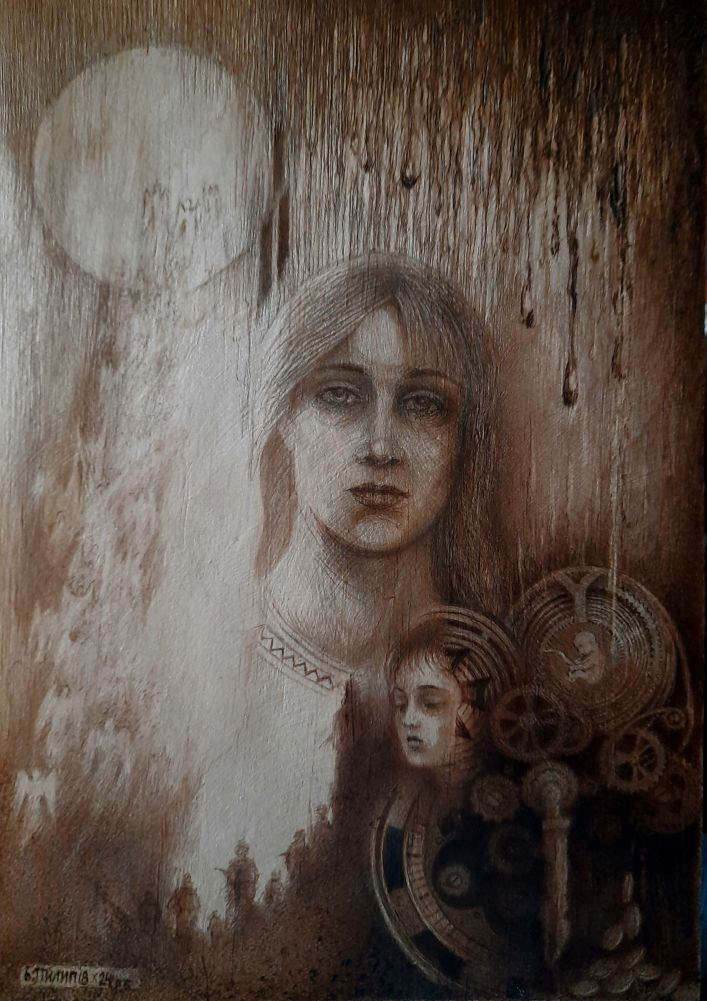
War. Preghiera di Requiem... Our pain, 2024

== Bibliography ==
- Вогняне перо на дерев'яних скрижалях // Зелені Карпати. — 2021. — № 1/4. — С. 168–169.
