= Chornyi Ostriv =

Chornyi Ostriv (alternatively: Chornyy Ostriv; "Black Island") can mean:

- Chornyi Ostriv, Khmelnytskyi Oblast, an urban-type settlement in Khmelnytskyi Raion, Khmelnytskyi Oblast, Ukraine
- Chornyi Ostriv, Lviv Oblast, a village in Zhydachiv Raion, Lviv Oblast, Ukraine
  - Chornyi Ostriv (railway stop), near Chornyi Ostriv, Lviv Oblast, on the Lviv-Chernivtsi line
  - Battle of Czarny Ostrów, 1657

== See also ==
- Ostriv (disambiguation)
