= Vyhoda, Kalush Raion, Ivano-Frankivsk Oblast =

Rural locality in Ivano-Frankivsk Oblast, Ukraine

Vyhoda Вигода
- Rural settlement
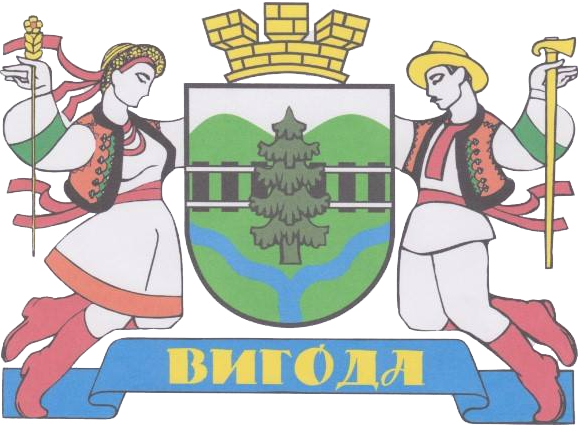
- Flag Seal
- Interactive map of Vyhoda
- Location within Ivano-Frankivsk Oblast Location within Ukraine
- Coordinates: 48°55′42″N 23°55′6″E
- Country: Ukraine
- Oblast: Ivano-Frankivsk Oblast
- Raion: Kalush Raion
- Founded: 1883

Government
  - City Chairman: Mychajlo Maceliuk

Area
  - Total: 1,590 km^{2} (610 sq mi)
- Elevation: 400 m (1,300 ft)

Population (2022)
  - Total: 2,257
  - Density: 143/km^{2} (370/sq mi)
- Time zone: UTC+2 (EET)
  - Summer (DST): UTC+3 (EEST)
- Postal code: 77552
- Area code: +380 3477

Vyhoda (Ukrainian: Вигода; also Wygoda or Vigoda) is a rural settlement in Kalush Raion, Ivano-Frankivsk Oblast, western Ukraine. It is located approximately 120 kilometres (75 mi) from Lviv. Vyhoda became a town in 1940 and lies on the Svicha River in the area of Gorgany. Vyhoda hosts the administration of Vyhoda settlement hromada, one of the hromadas of Ukraine. Population: 1,990 (2025 estimate); 2,257 (2022 estimate).

== History ==
Vyhoda's history started in the 19th century and was closely connected with the activity of Baron Leopold Popper von Podhragy. In 1873, Baron Leopold Popper von Podhragy opened a branch office in Pacykiv (a small village near Vyhoda, which since 1966 is a part of Vyhoda) after buying the domain Vyhoda, which consisted of approximately 35,000 hectares. At that time, the Popper's firm (at the time the company was the largest timber industry venture worldwide) specialized in logging, processing and sale of wood. In the 1880s, the Baron installed the first 18-gang sawmill in the area close to Vyhoda, many more sawmills followed. The Baron opened the first ever College of the Timber Industry in Vyhoda which was unique worldwide and the first in the Austro-Hungarian Empire. The Svicha river was used by Popper's firm as the way to transport wood from mountains to sawmill. However, this way of wood transport was not perfect since the river was often blocked by the wood flooding living area. That is why in 1883 the railroad was built by Baron Popper von Podhragy from the district center Dolyna to Vyhoda. This year (1883) is the official data of Vyhoda's founding. At the end of the 19th century, Vyhoda became to develop drastically, and in 1895 there were water and steam sawmills, the plant of wood frames of musical instruments, mill, and railway station. In 1897, the chemical plant specialized on wood alteration was built by German Peter Wergan. The Vyhoda's inhabitants took part in the First and the Second World War.

Until 18 July 2020, Vyhoda belonged to Dolyna Raion. The raion was abolished in July 2020 as part of the administrative reform of Ukraine, which reduced the number of raions of Ivano-Frankivsk Oblast to six. The area of Dolyna Raion was merged into Kalush Raion.

Until 26 January 2024, Vyhoda was designated urban-type settlement. On this day, a new law entered into force which abolished this status, and Vyhoda became a rural settlement.

== Geography ==
=== Location ===
Vyhoda is located at the base of the Carpathian Mountains, approximately 120 km from Lviv and 70 km from Ivano-Frankivsk. The average altitude of Vyhoda is 400 m (1,312.34 ft) above sea level.

=== Climate ===
Vyhoda's climate is humid continental (Köppen climate classification Dfb). The average temperatures are −6 °C (21 °F) in January and 25 °C (77 °F) in June. Average annual rainfall is 600 mm (26 inches) with the maximum being in summer. Cloud coverage averages 70 days per year.

== Demographics ==
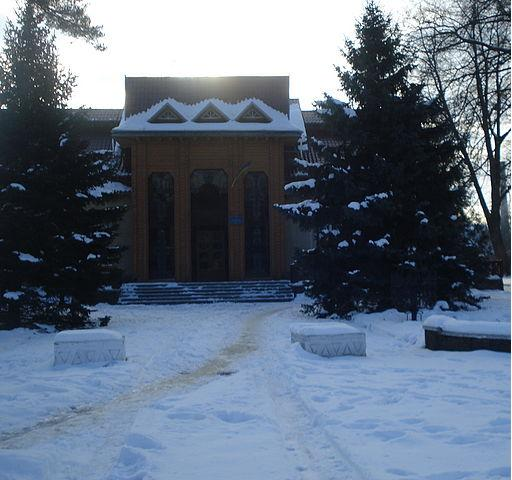
Vyhoda selyshna rada

- 2002: 2,278 inhabitants

The population of Vyhoda consists mainly of Ukrainians.

== Transport and economy ==
The public transportation is mainly represented by small buses and taxi. Large buses are not commonly used. The price (as of January 2011) of a one-way single ride in a taxi from Vyhoda to Dolyna (district center) is 2.5 UAH regardless of the distance traveled. No tickets are provided – and the money is paid to the driver. The connection between Vyhoda and near villages is provided by small buses which are going from district center Dolyna through Vyhoda. The price depends on distance, and in average is 4 UAH per 10 km (as of January 2014). Also, the motorway Dolyna - Khust passes through Vyhoda, providing access to Zakarpattia Oblast by buses or cars.

Several narrow gauge railways connect Vyhoda with the Carpathian Mountains. The settlement is a centre of sawmill and wood industry.

== Religion ==
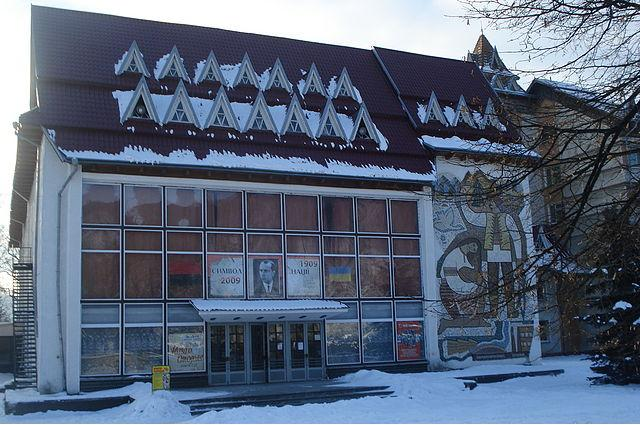
Vyhoda Club

Vyhoda was a vibrant city of both Jews and Christians. There are two Christian churches, which represent two Christian groups: The Ukrainian Catholic and Orthodox. The Jews who lived in Vyhoda prior to World War II were exterminated during the Holocaust.

== Education ==
Vyhoda has one high school, one kindergarten and one music school. The music school was opened in 1970, as the small children school with few teachers. However, now it is a big school located on the corner of V. Tereshkova and Zavodska Str with about 200 students.

== Sport ==
There is broad variety of sport activities in Vyhoda: light athletics, volleyball, basketball, tourism, etc. All sport activities are closely connected with high school. Mainly the teachers of the school's physical education are training the students.

== Tourist attractions ==
- Carpathian tram

== Gallery ==
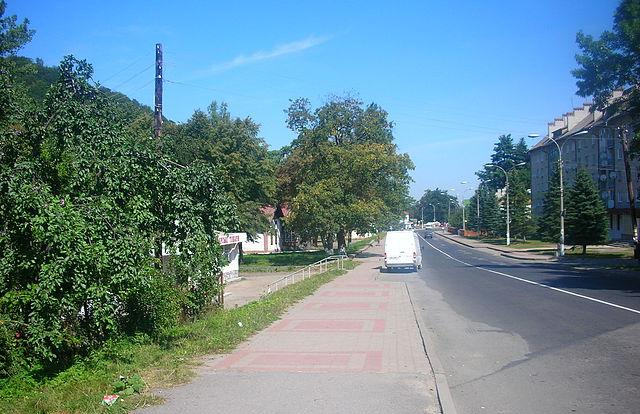
Vyhoda General view

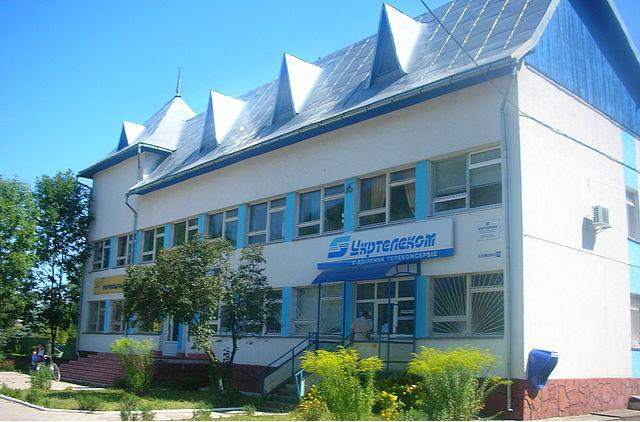
Vyhoda Post

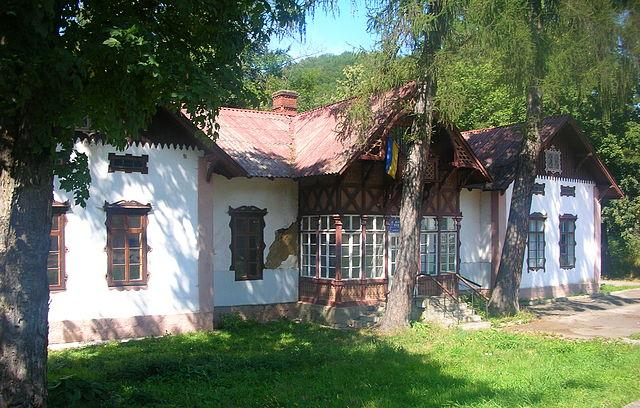
Vyhoda Police department
