= Ostrów =

Ostrów (Polish for "river island") may refer to:

== Places ==
=== Poland ===
Greater Poland Voivodeship

- Ostrów Wielkopolski, a town in Greater Poland Voivodeship (west-central Poland)
- Ostrów, Greater Poland Voivodeship in Greater Poland Voivodeship (central Poland)

Kuyavian-Pomeranian Voivodeship

- Ostrów, Brodnica County in Kuyavian-Pomeranian Voivodeship (north-central Poland)

Lesser Poland Voivodeship

- Ostrów, Proszowice County in Lesser Poland Voivodeship (south Poland)
- Ostrów, Tarnów County in Lesser Poland Voivodeship (south Poland)

Lublin Voivodship

- Ostrów Lubelski, a town in Lublin Voivodship (east Poland)
- Ostrów, Gmina Janów Podlaski, Biała County in Lublin Voivodeship (east Poland)
- Ostrów, Gmina Dorohusk in Lublin Voivodeship (east Poland)
- Ostrów, Gmina Wojsławice in Lublin Voivodeship (east Poland)
- Ostrów, Kraśnik County in Lublin Voivodeship (east Poland)
- Ostrów, Gmina Ulhówek, Tomaszów County in Lublin Voivodeship (east Poland)
- Ostrów, Lubartów County in Lublin Voivodeship (east Poland)

Lubusz Voivodeship

- Ostrów, Lubusz Voivodeship in Lubusz Voivodeship (west Poland)

Łódź Voivodeship

- Ostrów, Łask County in Łódź Voivodeship (central Poland)
- Ostrów, Łowicz County in Łódź Voivodeship (central Poland)
- Ostrów, Opoczno County in Łódź Voivodeship (central Poland)
- Ostrów, Gmina Aleksandrów in Łódź Voivodeship (central Poland)
- Ostrów, Gmina Grabica in Łódź Voivodeship (central Poland)
- Ostrów, Sieradz County in Łódź Voivodeship (central Poland)
- Ostrów, Gmina Ozorków in Łódź Voivodeship (central Poland)
- Ostrów, Gmina Zgierz in Łódź Voivodeship (central Poland)

Masovian Voivodeship

- Ostrów, Garwolin County in Masovian Voivodeship (east-central Poland)
- Ostrów, Kozienice County in Masovian Voivodeship (east-central Poland)
- Ostrów, Mława County in Masovian Voivodeship (north-central Poland)
- Ostrów, Otwock County in Masovian Voivodeship (east-central Poland)
- Ostrów, Sierpc County in Masovian Voivodeship (north-central Poland)
- Ostrów Mazowiecka, a town in Masovian Voivodship (east-central Poland)

Podlaskie Voivodeship

- Ostrów, Gmina Poświętne in Podlaskie Voivodeship (north-east Poland)
- Ostrów, Gmina Suraż in Podlaskie Voivodeship (north-east Poland)

Silesian Voivodeship

- Ostrów, Lubliniec County in Silesian Voivodeship (south Poland)
- Ostrów, Myszków County in Silesian Voivodeship (south Poland)

Subcarpathian Voivodeship

- Ostrów, Przemyśl County in Subcarpathian Voivodeship (south-east Poland)
- Ostrów, Jarosław County in Subcarpathian Voivodeship (south-east Poland)
- Ostrów, Przeworsk County in Subcarpathian Voivodeship (south-east Poland)
- Ostrów, Ropczyce-Sędziszów County in Subcarpathian Voivodeship (south-east Poland)

Świętokrzyskie Voivodeship

- Ostrów, Busko County in Świętokrzyskie Voivodeship (south Poland)
- Ostrów, Opatów County in Świętokrzyskie Voivodeship (south-central Poland)
- Ostrów, Kielce County in Świętokrzyskie Voivodeship (south-central Poland)
- Ostrów, Włoszczowa County in Świętokrzyskie Voivodeship (south-central Poland)

Warmian-Masurian Voivodeship

- Ostrów, Warmian-Masurian Voivodeship in Warmian-Masurian Voivodeship (north-east Poland)

West Pomeranian Voivodeship

- Ostrów, West Pomeranian Voivodeship West Pomeranian Voivodeship (north-west Poland)

=== Belarus ===
- Astraviec, town in Belarus
- Vostrava, village in Belarus where the Astrava Treaty was signed

=== Lithuania ===
- Astravas, suburb of Biržai, Lithuania

== Islands ==
- Ostrów Island, in Gdańsk
- Ostrów Lednicki, on Lednica Lake
- Ostrów Tumski, Głogów
- Ostrów Tumski, Poznań
- Ostrów Tumski, Wrocław

== See also ==
- Ostriv (disambiguation) (Ukrainian form)
- Ostrov (disambiguation)
- Ostrowo (disambiguation)
- Ostrowiec (disambiguation)
