= Ostroff =

Ostroff may refer to:

- Aviva Armour-Ostroff, Canadian actress, writer and filmmaker
- Dawn Ostroff, Chief Content Officer at Spotify
- Eugene Ostroff (1928–1999), American Historian
- Stephen Ostroff, acting commissioner of the US Food and Drug Administration from 2015 to 2016
- Ostroff, a terrorist in the American television series 24

== See also ==
- Ostrov (disambiguation)
