= Ilemnia =

Rural locality in Ivano-Frankivsk Oblast, Ukraine

Ilemnia Ілемня
- Interactive map of Ilemnia
- Location in Ivano-Frankivsk Oblast Ilemnia (Ukraine)
- Coordinates: 48°51′3″N 23°59′22″E
- Country: Ukraine
- Oblast: Ivano-Frankivsk Oblast
- Raion: Kalush Raion
- Hromada: Vyhoda settlement hromada
- Time zone: UTC+2 (EET)
  - Summer (DST): UTC+3 (EEST)
- Postal code: 77650

Ilemnia (Ukrainian: Ілемня) is a village in the Vyhoda settlement hromada of the Kalush Raion of Ivano-Frankivsk Oblast in Ukraine.

== History ==
The village was founded in the valley of the Ilemka River in 1582.

On 19 July 2020, as a result of the administrative-territorial reform and liquidation of the Rozhniativ Raion, the village became part of the Kalush Raion.

== Religion ==
There are two churches of the Intercession in the village: the Ukrainian Greek Catholic Church and the Orthodox Church of Ukraine.

== Notable residents ==
- Bohdan Pylypiv (born 1954), Ukrainian pyrography artist

== Bibliography ==
- "Ilemie (al. Iłemnia, po rusku Iłemie), wieś w pow. doliniańskim". Geographical Dictionary of the Kingdom of Poland (in Polish). 3. Warszawa: Kasa im. Józefa Mianowskiego. 1882. p. 257.
