= Volodymyr Patyk =

Ukrainian artist (1929–2016)

Volodymyr Patyk (Ukrainian: Володимир Йосипович Патик; born 9 October 1926, Chornyi Ostriv, Lwów Voivodeship, Polish Republic – 28 August 2016, Lviv, Ukraine) was a Ukrainian artist. Laureate of the Shevchenko National Prize in 1999

== Biography ==
Patyk was born in the village of Chornyy Ostriv, in what is now Stryi Raion, Lviv Oblast, Ukraine in 1926. In 1953, he graduated from The Lviv National Academy of Arts (in R. Selsky). The artist worked in the field of easel and monumental painting and graphics.

Patyk traveled almost the whole Ukraine, he was in the Carpathian Mountains, far to the north of Russia in Murmansk, he painted in the Baltic states, Siberia, Central Asia - and there the artist was captured by the beauty of nature, people and their activities. Thus was produced his own brushwork, his distinctive, spirited style. The artist proceeds to the contrast of red and green, orange and yellow and blue-violet, red and white, through a variety of means - mosaics, murals, most of all - to oil painting, pastels and various drawing tools. From the last time (since 1990) the main formative role in his artistic style plays a pure color that enhances the activity of emotional pictures and highlights the decorative solution compositions. Patyk is very close to Ukrainian icon and Tuscan primitives, Ravenna mosaics and Italian painters of Protorenaissance.

Patyk was a People's Artist of Ukraine (1996) and a holder of a Shevchenko National Prize (1999).

Patyk died at the age of 89 on 28 August 2016.

== Works ==
- "Through the Masonry" (1955);
- “The Burning Manuscript” (1964, about the bedroom of manuscripts at the Library of the Academy of Sciences of the Ukrainian Socialist Republic in the same room);
- “Shevchenko in the Fatherland”, “Hutsul Madonna” (1965);
- “The Girl from Bukovina” (1966);
- “Dovbush is our glory” (1967);
- “A third of the price to Ukraine” (1968);
- "T. G. Shevchenko among the villagers" (1969);
- “Step by Chigirina” (1976);
- "Tisha" (1976);
- “Requiem” (late 1960 - the beginning of the 1970s rocks - inspired by the rows of Vasyl Simonenko’s poetry “There is no longer room for graves on the book of shot-out illusions”);
- “Land of Shevchenko”, “Reve ta stogne Dnipr wide”, “Okolitsa village Shevchenko” (1981);
- “Memory” (1982 - about the tragedy of the Holodomor of 1933);
- “Rank over the Dnieper”, “Lemkivska Song (Nikifor and Antonich” (1982);
- “Autumn over Tyasmin” (1983);
- “Vidgomin 1933” (1984, canvas, oil);
- “Okolitsa Zolochev” (2008);
- “Stay the Way” (1987);
- “Oh, not the same for me”, “Above the Dnieper”, “Sonyahi” (1988);
- “There will be judgment, there will be punishment” (1989);
- “National Revival” (1990);
- "Montmartre" (1995);
- “Roar and Stogne the Dnieper is wide” (1997);
- series “Across Cherkasy region” (1980-1981);
- murals at the cinema im. Bohdan Khmelnitsky near Lviv;
- mosaics in the “Ocean” store (Volodymyr the Great St.) and on the territory of the “Kinescope” plant (Heroiv UPA St.) near Lviv.
