= Patsykiv =

Rural locality in Ivano-Frankivsk Oblast, Ukraine

Patsykiv Пациків
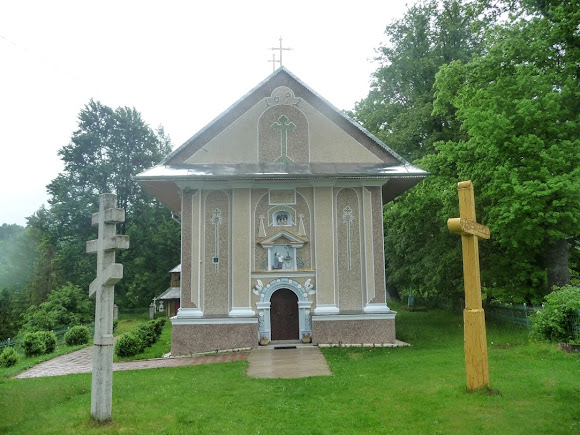
- Assumption Church (17th century)
- Interactive map of Patsykiv
- Location within Ivano-Frankivsk Oblast Location within Ukraine
- Coordinates: 48°55′42″N 23°55′6″E
- Country: Ukraine
- Oblast: Ivano-Frankivsk Oblast
- Raion (district): Kalush Raion
- Founded: 1674

Government
  - City Chairman: Mychajlo Maceliuk
- Elevation: 400 m (1,300 ft)
  - Density: 143/km^{2} (370/sq mi)
- Time zone: UTC+2 (EET)
  - Summer (DST): UTC+3 (EEST)
- Postal code: 77553
- Area code: +380 3477

Patsykiv (Ukrainian: Пациків, Polish: Pacyków) is a small village located in Kalush Raion of Ivano-Frankivsk Oblast and lies on the Svicha river. It belongs to Vyhoda settlement hromada, one of the hromadas of Ukraine.

== History ==
The village was a property of Andrzej Żurakowski and until 1772 belonged to Poland. In 1772 it was, together with Galicia, annexed to Austria (until 1918). In 1880 it was inhabited by 436 people. A well-known faience factory existed here from 1912 to 1939 known for its art-déco pottery. From 1919 to 1939 village belonged to Poland, under Soviet occupation 1939–41, then from 1941 to 1944 under German occupation in District Galicia of General Government. In 1944/45 to 1991 it was to the USSR.

Until 18 July 2020, Patsykiv belonged to Dolyna Raion. The raion was abolished in July 2020 as part of the administrative reform of Ukraine, which reduced the number of raions of Ivano-Frankivsk Oblast to six. The area of Dolyna Raion was merged into Kalush Raion.

== Geography ==
=== Location ===
Patsykiv is located in the Prykarpattia, approximately 120 km (75 mi) from Lviv and 70 km (43 mi) from Ivano-Frankivsk. The average altitude of Pac\tsykiv is 400 m (1,312.34 ft) above sea level.

=== Climate ===
Patsykiv's climate is humid continental (Köppen climate classification Dfb). The average temperatures are −6 °C (21 °F) in January and 25 °C (77 °F) in June. Average annual rainfall is 600 mm (24 in) with the maximum being in summer. Cloud coverage averages 70 days per year.

== Demographics ==
- 2002: 1200 inhabitants

The population of Patsykiv consist mainly of Ukrainians.

== Government ==
Government

== Religion ==
Patsykiv had a significant Jewish population which was wiped out during the Holocaust. Today, it is a city of one religion - Christian. There are two Christian churches, which represent two Christian groups: The Ukrainian Greek Catholic Church and the Eastern Orthodox Church.
