= Mutěnín =

- Municipality
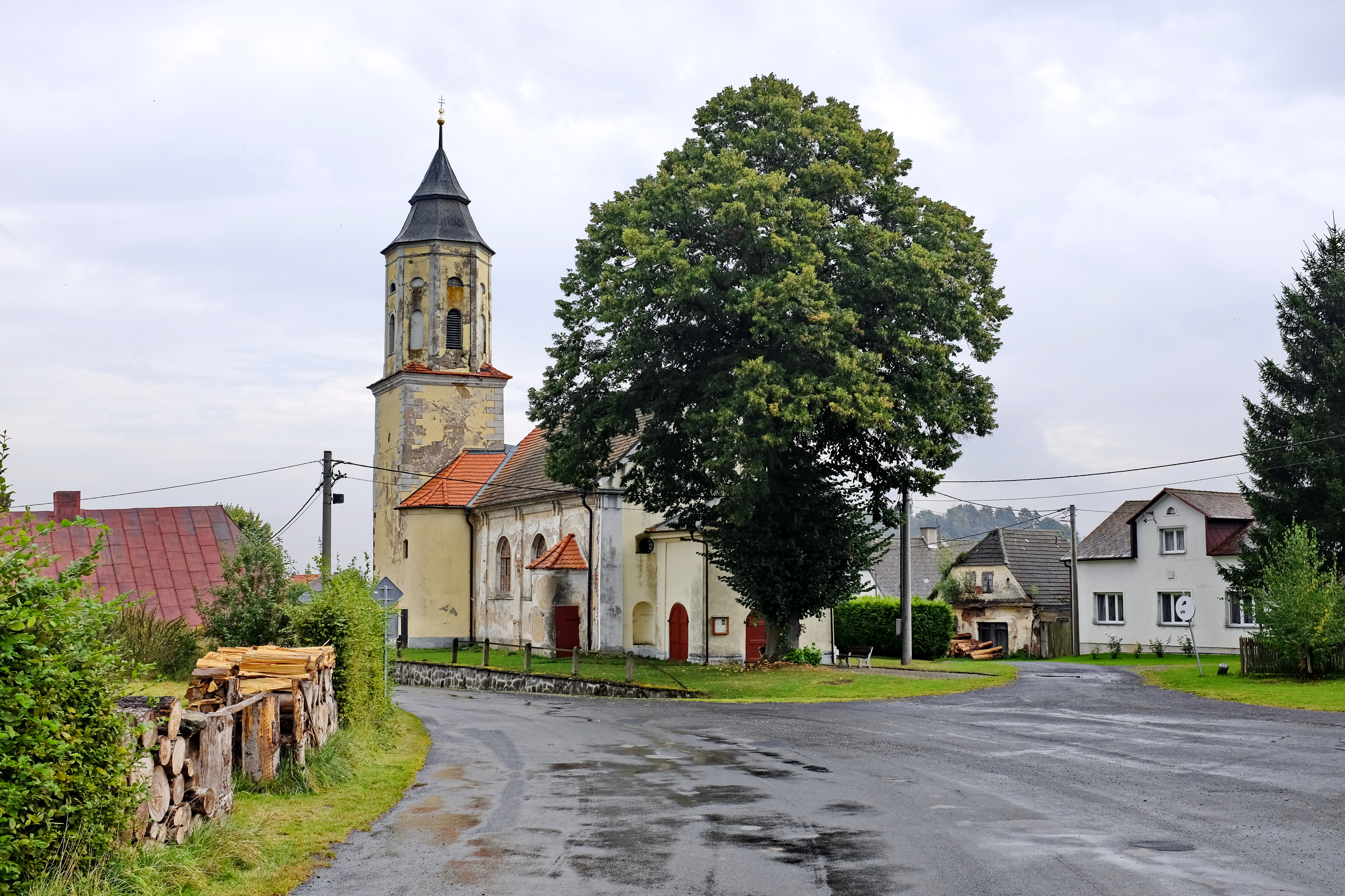
- Church of Saint Bartholomew

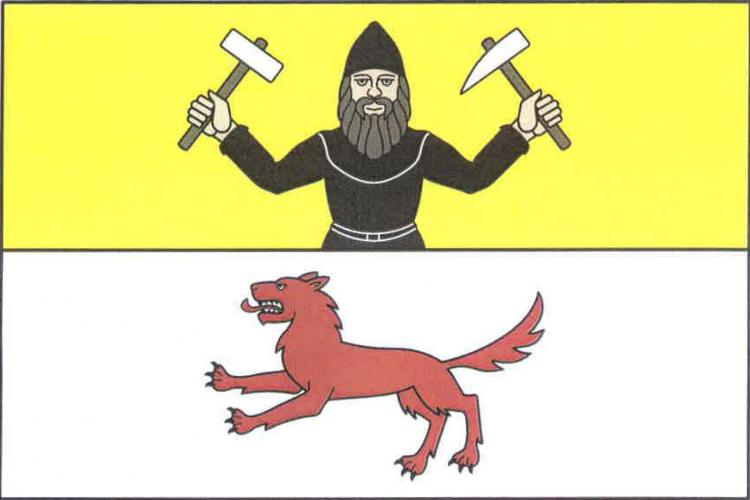
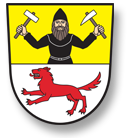
- Flag Coat of arms

- Location in the Czech Republic
- Coordinates: 49°32′42″N 12°44′41″E
- Country: Czech Republic
- Region: Plzeň
- District: Domažlice
- First mentioned: 1253

Area
  - Total: 15.48 km^{2} (5.98 sq mi)
- Elevation: 492 m (1,614 ft)

Population (2026-01-01)
  - Total: 272
  - Density: 17.6/km^{2} (45.5/sq mi)
- Time zone: UTC+1 (CET)
  - Summer (DST): UTC+2 (CEST)
- Postal code: 345 25
- Website: www.mutenin.cz

Mutěnín is a municipality and village in Domažlice District in the Plzeň Region of the Czech Republic. It has about 300 inhabitants.

Mutěnín lies approximately 18 kilometres (11 mi) north-west of Domažlice, 51 km (32 mi) south-west of Plzeň, and 135 km (84 mi) south-west of Prague.

== Administrative division ==
Mutěnín consists of four municipal parts (in brackets population according to the 2021 census):

- Mutěnín (214)
- Erazim (1)
- Ostrov (7)
- Starý Kramolín (34)

== Demographics ==
Historical population
Year	Pop.	±%
1869	1,721	—
1880	1,794	+4.2%
1890	1,778	−0.9%
1900	1,726	−2.9%
1910	1,777	+3.0%
1921	1,665	−6.3%
1930	1,533	−7.9%
1950	624	−59.3%
1961	617	−1.1%
1970	489	−20.7%
1980	343	−29.9%
1991	245	−28.6%
2001	230	−6.1%
2011	255	+10.9%
2021	256	+0.4%
Source: Censuses
