= Úmyslovice =

- Municipality
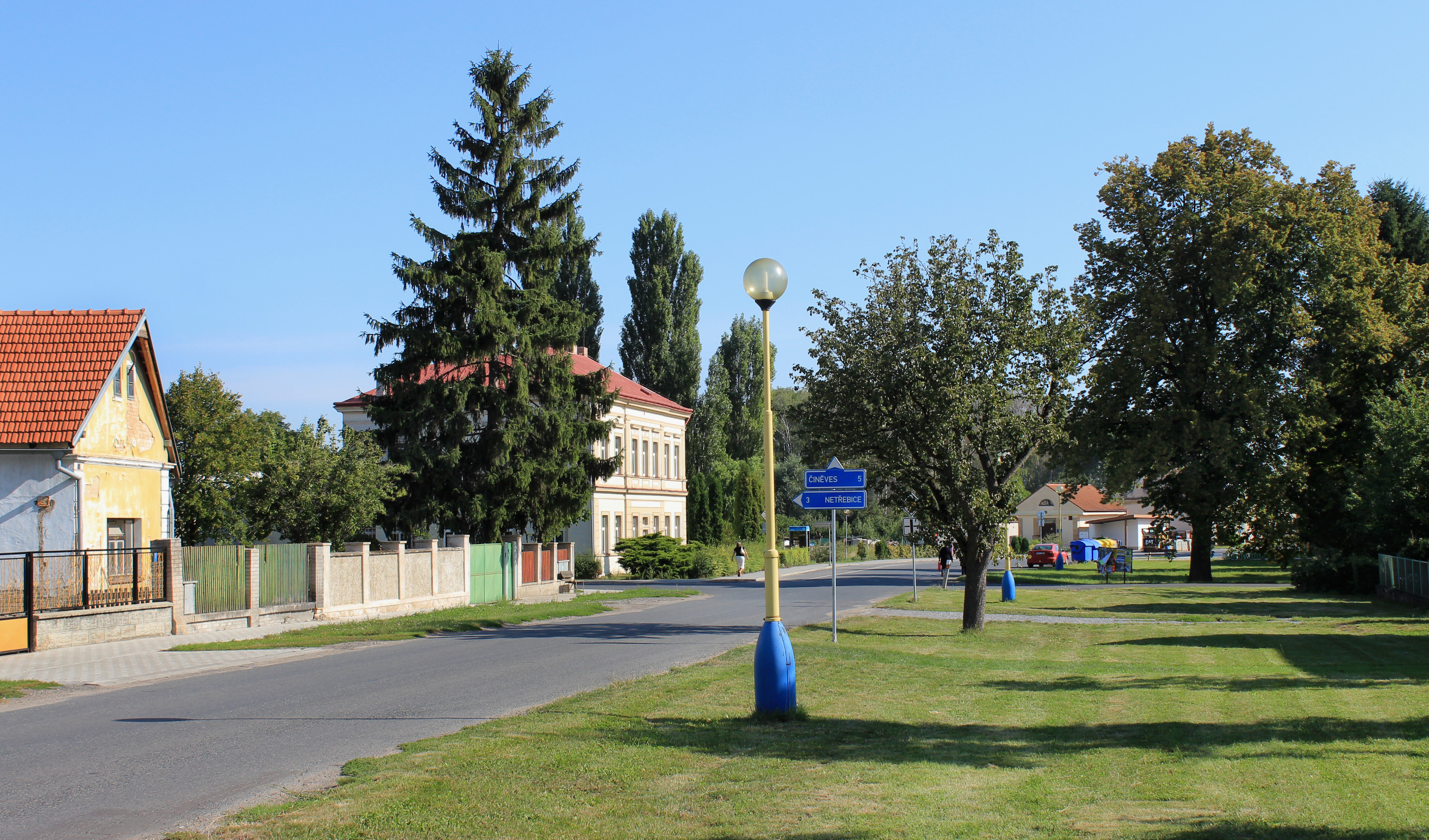
- Centre of Úmyslovice

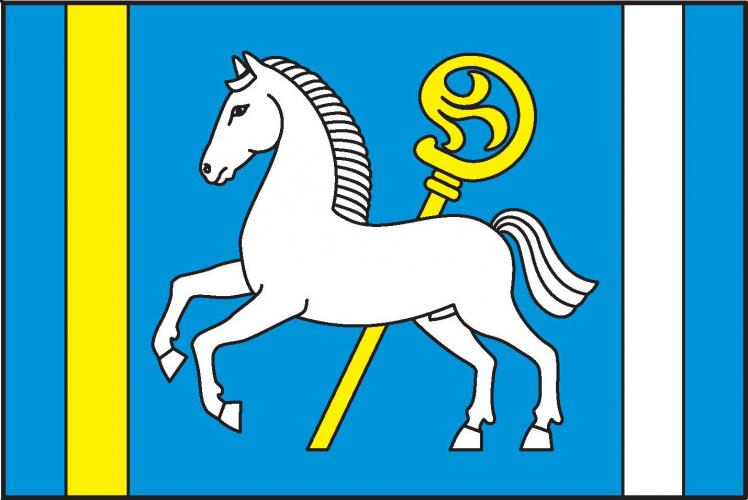
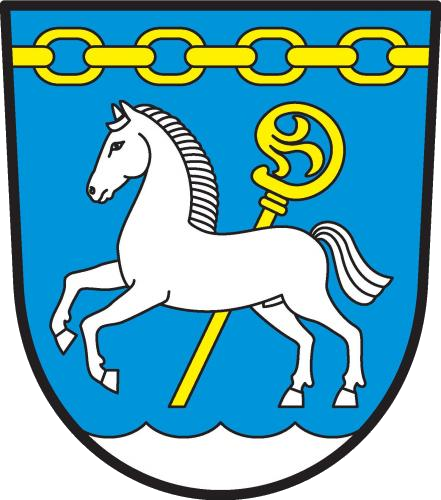
- Flag Coat of arms

- Location in the Czech Republic
- Coordinates: 50°12′12″N 15°10′40″E
- Country: Czech Republic
- Region: Central Bohemian
- District: Nymburk
- First mentioned: 1291

Area
  - Total: 6.24 km^{2} (2.41 sq mi)
- Elevation: 187 m (614 ft)

Population (2026-01-01)
  - Total: 333
  - Density: 53.4/km^{2} (138/sq mi)
- Time zone: UTC+1 (CET)
  - Summer (DST): UTC+2 (CEST)
- Postal code: 290 01
- Website: www.umyslovice.cz

Úmyslovice is a municipality and village in Nymburk District in the Central Bohemian Region of the Czech Republic. It has about 300 inhabitants.

== Administrative division ==
Úmyslovice consists of two municipal parts (in brackets population according to the 2021 census):

- Úmyslovice (281)
- Ostrov (17)

== Etymology ==
The name is derived from the personal name Úmysl or Úmyslav, meaning "the village of Úmysl's/Úmyslav's people".

== Geography ==
Úmyslovice is located about 9 kilometres (6 mi) east of Nymburk and 46 km (29 mi) east of Prague. It lies in a flat agricultural landscape in the Central Elbe Table.

== History ==
The first written mention of Úmyslovice is from 1291. The village continuously belonged to the Poděbrady estate until the establishment of the independent municipality in 1850.

== Demographics ==
Historical population

Year	Pop.	±%
1869	372	—
1880	438	+17.7%
1890	506	+15.5%
1900	512	+1.2%
1910	558	+9.0%

Year	Pop.	±%
1921	516	−7.5%
1930	530	+2.7%
1950	361	−31.9%
1961	401	+11.1%
1970	364	−9.2%

Year	Pop.	±%
1980	344	−5.5%
1991	316	−8.1%
2001	311	−1.6%
2011	297	−4.5%
2021	298	+0.3%

Source: Censuses

== Transport ==
There are no railways or major roads passing through the municipality.

== Sights ==
The main landmark of Úmyslovice is the Church of Saint Leonard. The church was built in 1729–1732, then it was completely rebuilt in the Neoclassical style in 1812. Neo-Gothic modifications were made at the end of the 19th century.
