= Ostrov u Bezdružic =

- Municipality
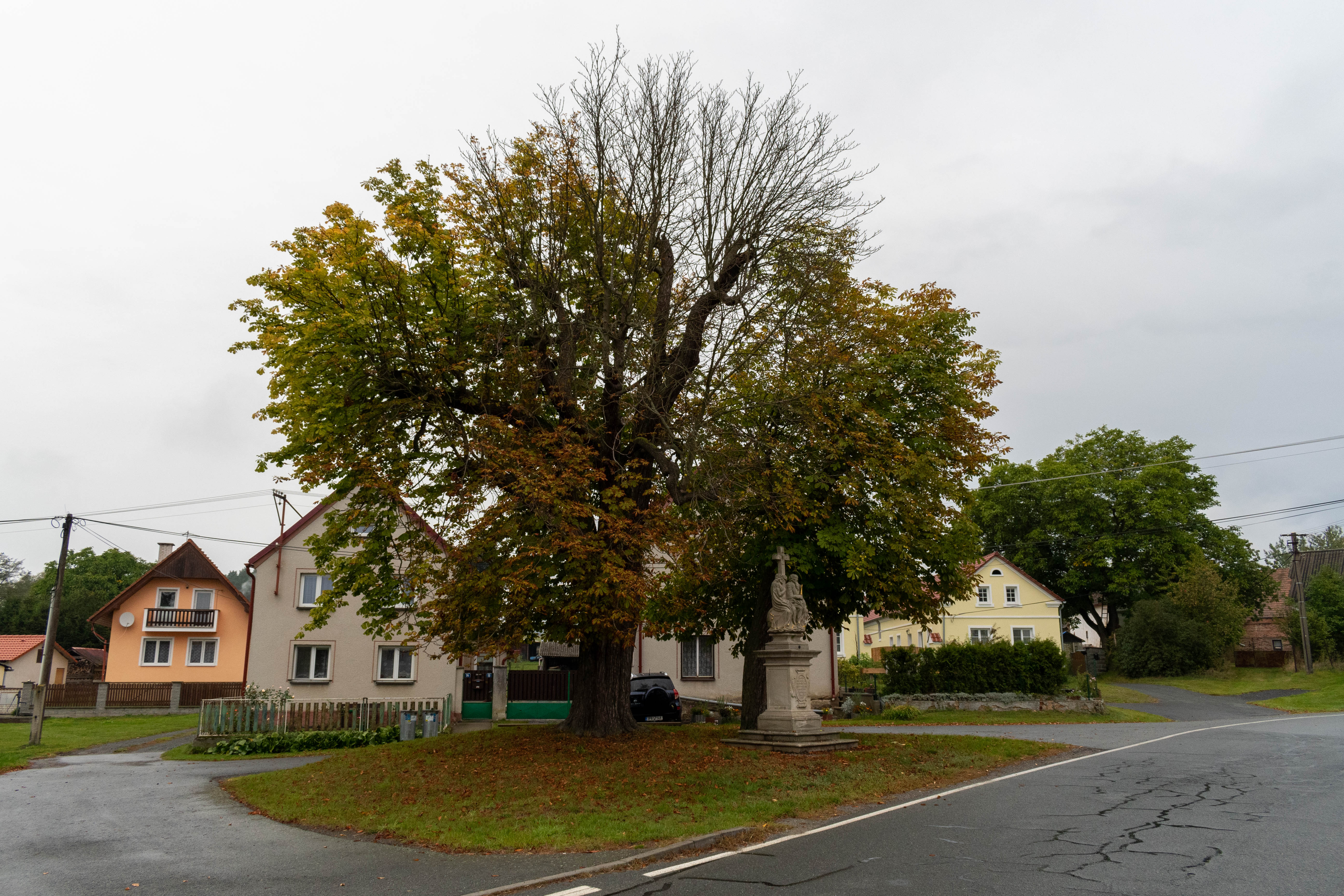
- Pláň, a part of Ostrov u Bezdružic

- Location in the Czech Republic
- Coordinates: 49°54′0″N 13°2′31″E
- Country: Czech Republic
- Region: Plzeň
- District: Plzeň-North
- First mentioned: 1483

Area
  - Total: 13.02 km^{2} (5.03 sq mi)
- Elevation: 515 m (1,690 ft)

Population (2026-01-01)
  - Total: 197
  - Density: 15.1/km^{2} (39.2/sq mi)
- Time zone: UTC+1 (CET)
  - Summer (DST): UTC+2 (CEST)
- Postal codes: 330 36, 330 38
- Website: www.ostrovubezdruzic.cz

Ostrov u Bezdružic (until 1950 Ostrov; German: Wostrowa) is a municipality and village in Plzeň-North District in the Plzeň Region of the Czech Republic. It has about 200 inhabitants.

Ostrov u Bezdružic lies approximately 30 kilometres (19 mi) north-west of Plzeň and 102 km (63 mi) west of Prague.

== Administrative division ==
Ostrov u Bezdružic consists of three municipal parts (in brackets population according to the 2021 census):

- Ostrov u Bezdružic (58)
- Krsov (48)
- Pláň (87)

== Demographics ==
Historical population
Year	Pop.	±%
1869	497	—
1880	574	+15.5%
1890	574	+0.0%
1900	538	−6.3%
1910	536	−0.4%
1921	556	+3.7%
1930	571	+2.7%
1950	258	−54.8%
1961	263	+1.9%
1970	254	−3.4%
1980	239	−5.9%
1991	198	−17.2%
2001	203	+2.5%
2011	195	−3.9%
2021	193	−1.0%
Source: Censuses
