= Ostrov (Havlíčkův Brod District) =

- Municipality
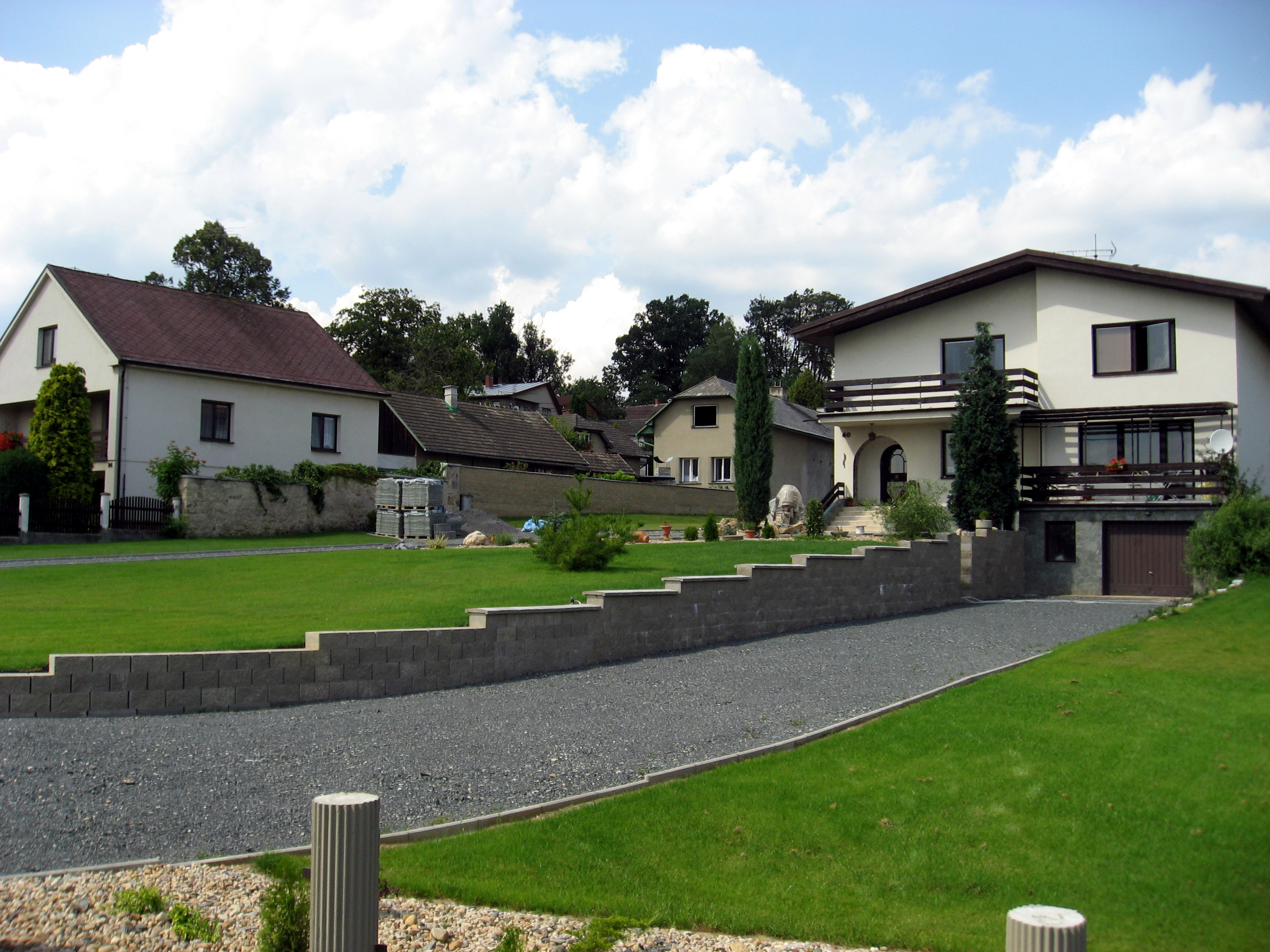
- Houses in Ostrov

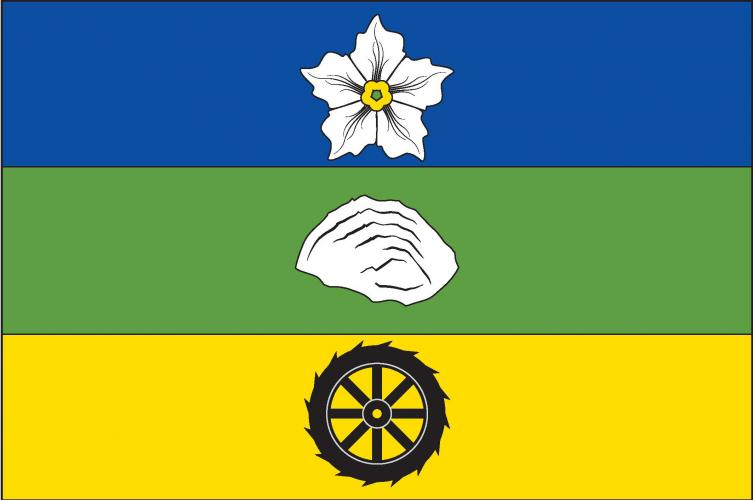
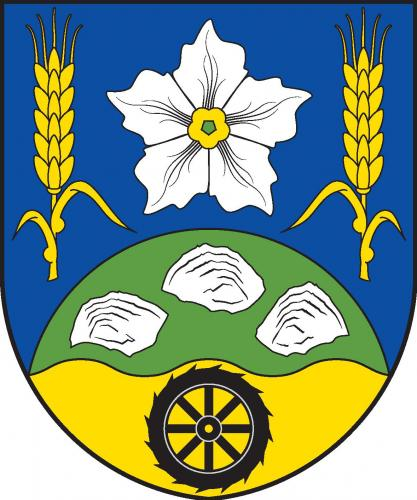
- Flag Coat of arms

- Location in the Czech Republic
- Coordinates: 49°41′35″N 15°18′5″E
- Country: Czech Republic
- Region: Vysočina
- District: Havlíčkův Brod
- First mentioned: 1408

Area
  - Total: 2.53 km^{2} (0.98 sq mi)
- Elevation: 413 m (1,355 ft)

Population (2026-01-01)
  - Total: 166
  - Density: 65.6/km^{2} (170/sq mi)
- Time zone: UTC+1 (CET)
  - Summer (DST): UTC+2 (CEST)
- Postal code: 584 01
- Website: www.ostrov-obec.cz

Ostrov is a municipality and village in Havlíčkův Brod District in the Vysočina Region of the Czech Republic. It has about 200 inhabitants.

Ostrov lies approximately 23 kilometres (14 mi) north-west of Havlíčkův Brod, 39 km (24 mi) north-west of Jihlava, and 77 km (48 mi) south-east of Prague.

== Demographics ==
Historical population
Year	Pop.	±%
1869	180	—
1880	178	−1.1%
1890	193	+8.4%
1900	186	−3.6%
1910	199	+7.0%
1921	189	−5.0%
1930	136	−28.0%
1950	99	−27.2%
1961	109	+10.1%
1970	101	−7.3%
1980	102	+1.0%
1991	107	+4.9%
2001	115	+7.5%
2011	130	+13.0%
2021	146	+12.3%
Source: Censuses
