= Ostrovo =

Ostrovo may refer to:

- Arnissa, a town in Greece formerly called Ostrovo
- Ostrovo, Croatia, a village near Markušica, Vukovar-Syrmia County, Croatia
- Ostrovo, Veliko Gradište, a village in Serbia
- Ostrovo, Požarevac, a village in Serbia
- Ostrovo (island), a river island in Serbia
- Ostrovo, Bulgaria, a village in Razgrad Province, Bulgaria
- Ostrovo (Skopje), a part of Skopje, Macedonia
- Lake Ostrovo or Lake Vergoritis in Macedonia, northern Greece
