= Vyhoda settlement hromada =

Hromada in Ivano-Frankivsk Oblast, Ukraine

Vyhoda settlement hromada Вигодська селищна громада
- Hromada
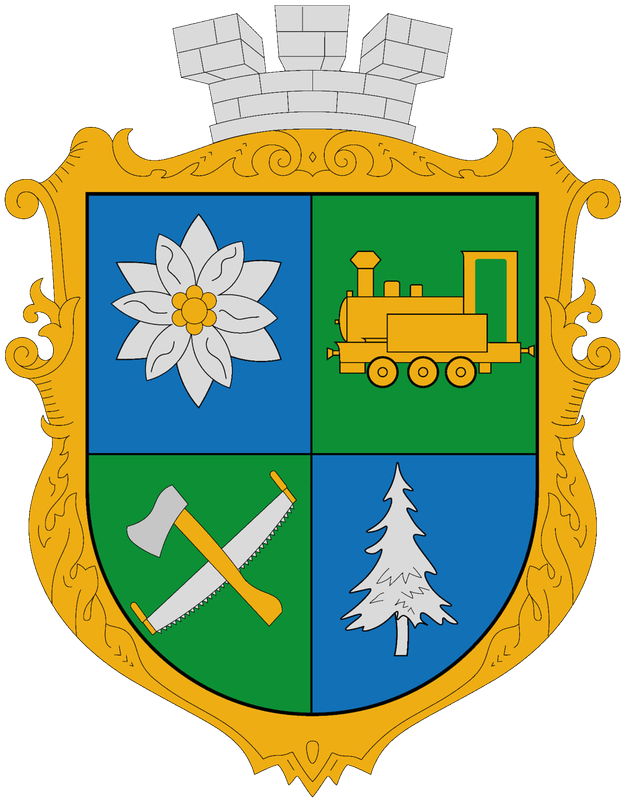
- Flag Coat of arms
- Interactive map of Vyhoda settlement hromada
- Country: Ukraine
- Oblast: Ivano-Frankivsk
- Raion: Kalush
- Admin. center: Vyhoda

Area
  - Total: 385.56 km^{2} (148.87 sq mi)

Population (2018)
  - Total: 12,618
  - Density: 32.726/km^{2} (84.761/sq mi)
- CATOTTG code: UA26060070000011203
- Settlements: 17
- Rural settlements: 1
- Villages: 16
- Website: vygodska-gromada.gov.ua

Vyhoda settlement hromada (Ukrainian: Вигодська селищна громада) is a hromada in Ukraine, in Kalush Raion of Ivano-Frankivsk Oblast. The administrative center is the rural settlement of Vyhoda.

== Settlements ==
The hromada consists of 1 rural settlement (Vyhoda) and 16 villages:

- Anhelivka
- Vyshkiv
- Ilemnia
- Kropyvnyk
- Lolyn
- Maksymivka
- Myslivka
- Novyi Mizun
- Novoselytsia
- Novoshyn
- Patsykiv
- Pidlisky
- Pshenychnyky
- Senechiv
- Staryi Mizun
- Shevchenkove
