= Třebnouševes =

- Municipality
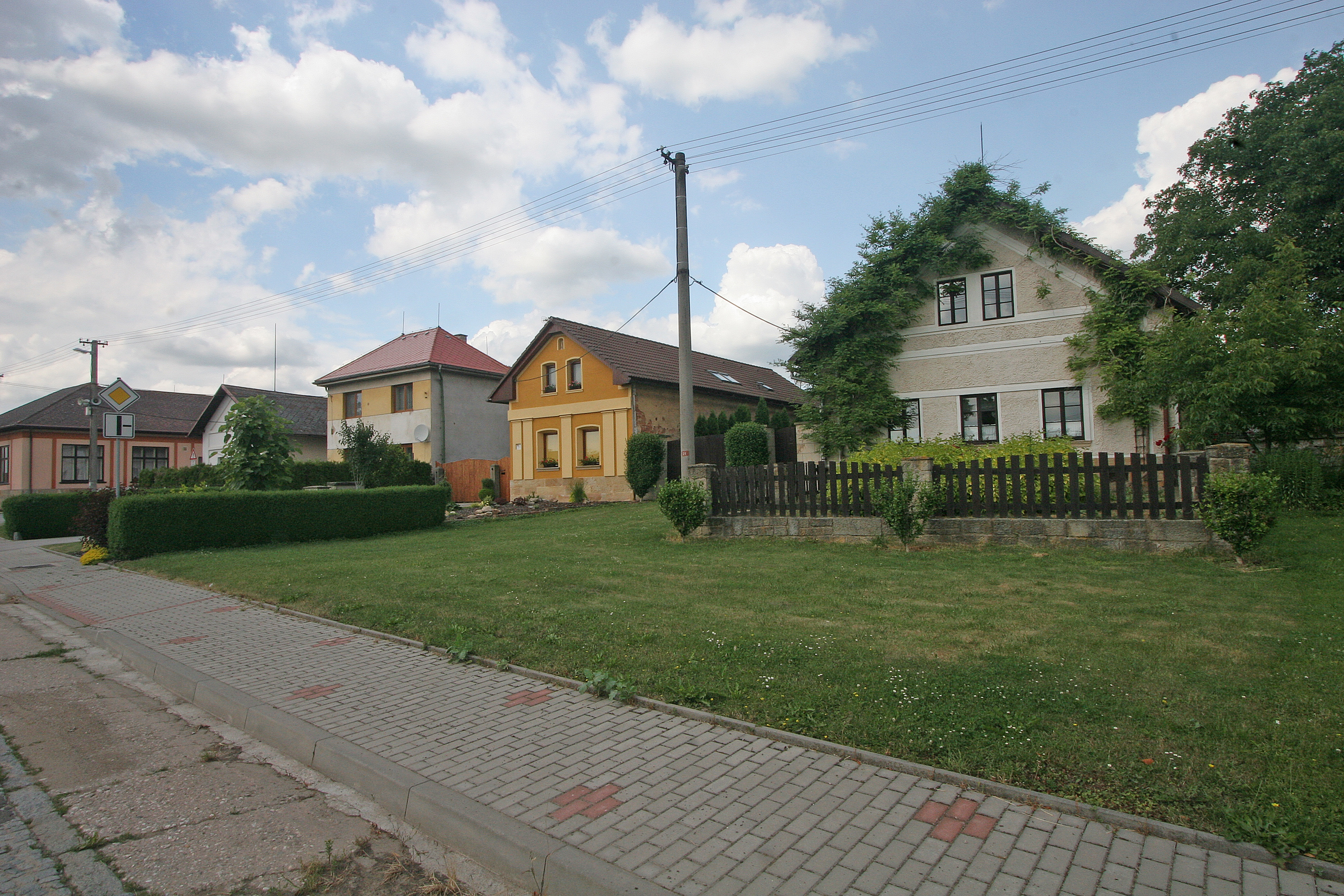
- Houses in Třebnouševes

- Flag Coat of arms

- Location in the Czech Republic
- Coordinates: 50°20′21″N 15°39′6″E
- Country: Czech Republic
- Region: Hradec Králové
- District: Jičín
- First mentioned: 1143

Area
  - Total: 6.27 km^{2} (2.42 sq mi)
- Elevation: 278 m (912 ft)

Population (2026-01-01)
  - Total: 297
  - Density: 47.4/km^{2} (123/sq mi)
- Time zone: UTC+1 (CET)
  - Summer (DST): UTC+2 (CEST)
- Postal code: 508 01
- Website: www.trebnouseves.cz

Třebnouševes is a municipality and village in Jičín District in the Hradec Králové Region of the Czech Republic. It has about 300 inhabitants.

== Administrative division ==
Třebnouševes consists of three municipal parts (in brackets population according to the 2021 census):

- Třebnouševes (190)
- Ostrov (46)
- Vinice (25)

== Demographics ==
Historical population
Year	Pop.	±%
1869	531	—
1880	530	−0.2%
1890	441	−16.8%
1900	478	+8.4%
1910	540	+13.0%
1921	525	−2.8%
1930	488	−7.0%
1950	375	−23.2%
1961	350	−6.7%
1970	305	−12.9%
1980	320	+4.9%
1991	305	−4.7%
2001	286	−6.2%
2011	274	−4.2%
2021	261	−4.7%
Source: Censuses
