= Ostrowiec =

Ostrowiec may refer to several places:

- Ostrowiec, Grodno Region, a town in Western Belarus
  - Ostrowiec District, administrative region in Western Belarus
- Ostrowiec Świętokrzyski, a town and county seat in south-central Poland
  - Ostrowiec County, in Świętokrzyskie Voivodeship, south-central Poland
- Ostrowiec, Łódź Voivodeship (central Poland)
- Ostrowiec, Lubusz Voivodeship (west Poland)
- Ostrowiec, Sokołów County in Masovian Voivodeship (east-central Poland)
- Ostrowiec, Myślibórz County in West Pomeranian Voivodeship (north-west Poland)
- Ostrowiec, Sławno County in West Pomeranian Voivodeship (north-west Poland)
- Ostrowiec, Wałcz County in West Pomeranian Voivodeship (north-west Poland)

Ostrówiec may refer to several places:

- Ostrówiec, Greater Poland Voivodeship (west-central Poland)
- Ostrówiec, Masovian Voivodeship (east-central Poland)
