= Ostrowo =

Ostrowo may refer to:

In Greater Poland Voivodeship (west-central Poland):

- Ostrowo, Gostyń County
- Ostrowo, Konin County
- Ostrowo, Słupca County
- Ostrowo, Śrem County
- Ostrów Wielkopolski, Ostrów County (formerly known in German as Ostrowo)

In Kuyavian-Pomeranian Voivodeship (north-central Poland):

- Ostrowo, Gmina Gniewkowo
- Ostrowo, Mogilno County
- Ostrowo, Nakło County
- Ostrowo, Tuchola County
- Ostrowo, Wąbrzeźno County

In Pomeranian Voivodeship (north Poland):

- Ostrowo, Puck County
- Ostrowo, Bytów County
- Ostrowo, Kartuzy County

In Warmian-Masurian Voivodeship (north Poland):

- Ostrowo, Warmian-Masurian Voivodeship, in Gmina Dubeninki

== See also ==
- Ostrów (disambiguation)
