= Ostrau =

Ostrau may refer to the following places:

- Ostrau, Mittelsachsen, a municipality in the district Mittelsachsen, Saxony, Germany
- Ostrau (Bad Dürrenberg), a village in Bad Dürrenberg in the Saalekreis district, Saxony-Anhalt, Germany
- Ostrau (Elsteraue), a village in Elsteraue in the Burgenlandkreis, Saxony-Anhalt, Germany
- Ostrau (Petersberg), a village and former municipality in the Saalekreis district, Saxony-Anhalt, Germany
- Ostrau (Grimma), a part of Grimma in the district Landkreis Leipzig, Saxony, Germany
- Ostrau (Bad Schandau), a village in Bad Schandau municipality, Saxony, Germany
- the German name for Ostrava, Czech Republic
