= Chornyi Ostriv, Lviv Oblast =

Village in Zhydachiv Raion, Lviv Oblast, Ukraine

Coordinates: 49.4614°N 24.2769°E

Chornyi Ostriv (Ukrainian: Чорний Острів) is a village in Stryi Raion, Lviv Oblast, Ukraine. The village has 636 inhabitants (2025).

There is a railway stop, Chornyi Ostriv, located nearby on the Lviv-Chernivtsi line.

In the Second Polish Republic, the town was the seat of the rural commune of Ostrów in the Bóbre County (Lviv Province).
