= Perehinske =

Rural locality in Ivano-Frankivsk Oblast, Ukraine

Perehinske Перегінське
- Rural settlement
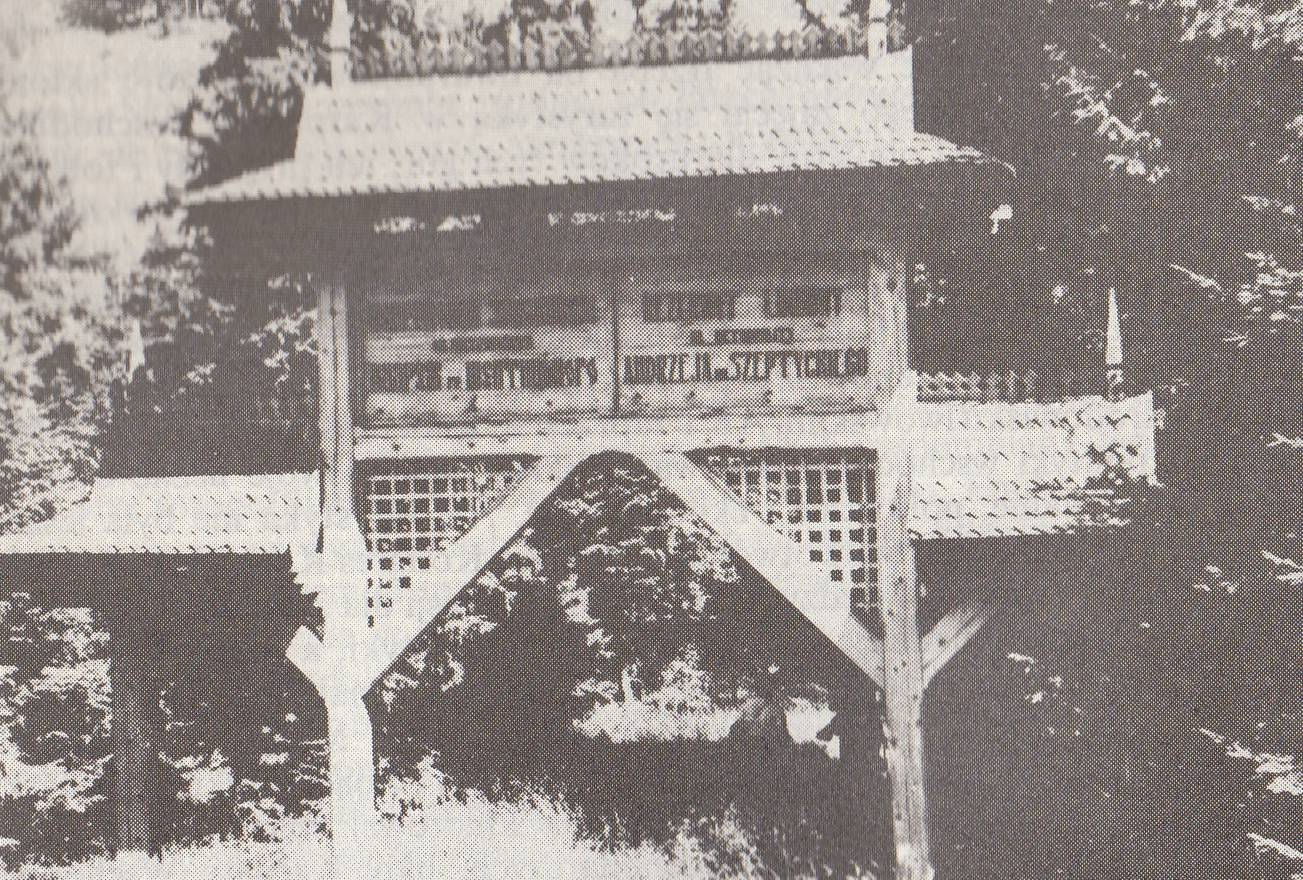
- Swiss Pine forest reserve established by Andriy Sheptytsky, August 1939
- Interactive map of Perehinske
- Location within Ivano-Frankivsk Oblast Location within Ukraine
- Coordinates: 48°59′38″N 24°11′40″E
- Country: Ukraine
- Oblast: Ivano-Frankivsk Oblast
- Raion: Kalush Raion
- Established: 1292

Population (2022)
  - Total: 12,681

Perehinske (Ukrainian: Перегінське; Polish: Perehińsko; Hebrew: פרהינסקו) is a rural settlement in Kalush Raion, Ivano-Frankivsk Oblast, western Ukraine. It is located 15 km away from Rozhniativ. Perehinske hosts the administration of Perehinske settlement hromada, one of the hromadas of Ukraine. Population: 12,681 (2022 estimate).

== History ==
According to Antoni Schneider's research, the village was originally named Peren' hinul or Perehinulsko and could have been settled as early as 1292. Already in the Middle Ages, the village was given by Prince Fiodor Olgierdowic of Gediminids, duke of Ratno, Liuboml and Kobryn to the Orthodox cathedral of Krylos near Halicz. However, with time it passed into private hands and then to the king of Poland. Around 1400, a small monastery was built atop the Serhiy mountain overlooking the village.

In 1548, king Sigismund I of Poland allowed bishop Makary of Lvov, Kamieniec and Halicz to buy back the property. However, the transaction was apparently never accomplished, as in the following decades the village was still registered as a royal property in state's registers. The conflict about the village's ownership lasted 230 years. The matter was first settled in 1593, when Stanisław Żółkiewski, the then castellan of Lvov, donated the village to Gedeon Balaban, the bishop of Lvov. It then passed to his relative Alexander, who died heir-less. In December 1638, king Władysław IV of Poland donated the village to his podczaszy Jan Stanisław Jabłonowski, father to hetman Stanisław Jan Jabłonowski. The conflict over the ownership of the village however continued, as the claim on the village was upheld by both the dis-uniate Orthodox bishop Arseniusz Żeliborski of Lvov and Uniate Basilian monks, who also claimed it on their own behalf. It was only in May 1661 that king Jan Kazimierz of Poland finally ruled in favour of Jabłonowskis and annulled all claims by bishops of Lvov. However, as Jabłonowskis received numerous other villages and titles in Ruthenian Voivodeship, in 1690 the Sejm overruled that decision and granted the village to Orthodox cathedral of Krylos near Halicz.

A royal lustration of 1660 revealed that the village had a manor, a tavern, Orthodox church, mill and 16 lans of arable land, of which 6 were owned by local peasants and the rest belonged to the manor. Altogether, the taxes from the village amounted to 1750 złoty. In 1667, Perehińsko was raided by Tartars, the inhabitants however managed to flee to the mountains and escape unharmed. On May 28, 1690 king Jan III Sobieski granted the village with a privilege to organise markets once a year. The village was seized by the Turks, who destroyed the local orthodox church, but was then retaken by royal forces. In commemoration of this victory, bishop Józef Szumlański founded a new Orthodox church and a small monastery, both devoted to Saint Onuphrius. Although the Jabłonowskis withdrew their claim to the village, the conflict continued, as bishop Szumlański claimed the village to himself rather than to Orthodox church in general and Basilian friars of Krylos continued to question that in courts for another 20 years, until bishop Lew Szeptycki finally settled the issue in 1780.

By the 19th century, the village grew to be one of the largest in the region, from its northern end to the southern outskirts, it measured roughly 50 kilometres. It was a property of Greek Catholic metropolitan bishops of Lvov. In 1880 it had 4294 inhabitants, mostly Ruthenian. The facilities included numerous sawmills utilising wood from surrounding forests and exporting it via the Łomnica (Limnitsia) river, navigable for 6 months in a year.

Although the mountainous region's soils were unsuitable for farming, it contained significant amounts of iron ore. Due to this reason, in 1810, Greek Catholic metropolitan of Lvov Antoni Angełowicz founded a small iron mine to the south-west of the village in a suburb that came to be known as Angełówka, after its founder. However, financial difficulties as well as technical problems led to the enterprises' failure and it went bankrupt in 1818.

According to the Polish census of 1921, there were 5917 people living in Perehińsko, including 612 Jews. In 1939 the village was occupied by the Soviet Union and the following year it was declared an urban-type settlement, an administrative unit between a village and a town. Most traces of Jewish life were destroyed during and after World War II and currently only a devastated cemetery remains.

Until 18 July 2020, Perehinske belonged to Rozhniativ Raion. It was the biggest settlement in the raion. The raion was abolished in July 2020 as part of the administrative reform of Ukraine, which reduced the number of raions of Ivano-Frankivsk Oblast to six. The area of Rozhniativ Raion was merged into Kalush Raion.

Until 26 January 2024, Perehinske was designated urban-type settlement. On this day, a new law entered into force which abolished this status, and Perehinske became a rural settlement.

== Name ==
Perehinske is an official name, but also known as Perehins'ke, Pereginsko, Perehinsko, Perechinsko, Perekhinskoye, Перегинское, Perehińsko, Perekhin'sko, Prekhin'sko, Perechińsko, Perekhin'sko, Pereginskoye or Perensk.

== Administration ==
Perehinske has been in the following administrative districts:

Time	Name	Powiat/Raion	Province	Country
Before World War I (c. 1900):	Perehińsko	Dolina	Galicia	Austrian Empire
Between the wars (c. 1930):	Perehińsko	Dolina	Stanisławów	Republic of Poland
World War II (c. 1940):	Perehinske	Perehinske	Stanislav	Poland until 22 Sep 1939 de facto Ukrainian SSR, Soviet Union 15 Nov 1939 de jure District of Galicia, Nazi Germany 1941-1944; Ukrainian SSR, Soviet Union by 26 July 1944
After World War II (1959):	Perehinske	Rozhniativ	Ivano-Frankivsk	Ukrainian SSR, Soviet Union
1991 2020	Perehinske	Rozhniativ	Ivano-Frankivsk	Ukraine
Since 2020	Perehinske	Kalush	Ivano-Frankivsk	Ukraine

== Notable residents ==
- Ivan Holubovskyi (1878–1957), Ukrainian lawyer, writer
