= Rozhniativ Castle =

Lost defensive structure in Rozhniativ, Ivano-Frankivsk Oblast, Ukraine

- Rozhniativ, Kalush Raion Ivano-Frankivsk Oblast
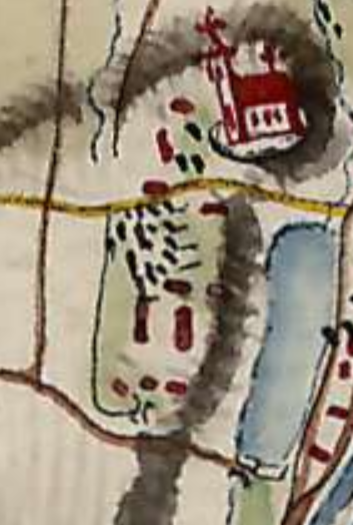
- Rozhniativ Castle on the map of Friedrich von Mieg, 18th century

Site information
- Owner: Ukraine
- Condition: ruined

Location
- Coordinates: 48°56′16″N 24°09′09″E

Rozhniativ Castle or Skarbek Castle (Ukrainian: Рожнятівський замок, romanized: Rozhniativskyi zamok), is a lost defensive structure in the settlement of Rozhniativ, Ivano-Frankivsk Oblast, Ukraine. It is a monument of architecture of local significance.

== History ==
In the southwestern part of Rozhniativ, on a hill (now the territory of the district police department), there is a palace-type building. Next to it are the steep slopes of the hill, where the remnants of a former large reservoir, which served as a natural defense, can be traced, as well as the remains of moats nearby.

The researcher Kamil Baranski mentioned in his work that "in the 15th century, there was a castle that had three towers, moats with water around it, ramparts, and cellars". In the work of Orest Matsiuk, it is noted that the castle was "oriented north-south, with ramparts on the northeastern sides, and a fragment of a bastion on the northern ones". Alfred Wajda wrote about the location of the fortress in an appendix to the magazine "Słowo Polskie" (1925), that "between Kalush and Dolyna, there was a settlement of Stare Selo with a defensive castle, which at one time was besieged by Tatar detachments". The initiator and founder of the castle's construction remain undetermined.

In the autumn of 1648, the citadel of the Polish nobility was captured by the oppressed Ukrainian local population. A detailed description of the event is found in a lawsuit filed by Samuel Poniatowski against the townspeople and peasants of the Kalush and Dolyna starosta districts (concluded in March 1649), which states that "local Ukrainians, having gathered three or four thousand people, first plundered Poniatowski's courtyard in Svarychiv, then went to Rozhniativ Castle, where the nobility had brought their livestock and goods. Realizing that it would be difficult to defend the castle from the enraged peasantry, the nobility was forced to flee in a hurry with their children and wives, leaving all their property in the castle. They left on foot, as it was difficult to travel by cart. The Ukrainians, breaking into the castle and plundering it, headed into the mountains in pursuit. They caught up with the fugitives, killing, torturing, and robbing a large number of the nobility. Barely a few were able to escape, some on foot, others on horses". During the raid, the castle was not destroyed, as the Ukrainian population, due to the lack of its defense, took it without any resistance. The Polish historian Władysław Łoziński also wrote about this event.

In 1650, Cossacks and peasants burned down the fortress, which was later rebuilt. In October 1672, during the pursuit of a large detachment of Tatar Khan Selim Giray loaded with plunder, the Grand Crown Hetman John III Sobieski sent messengers to Rozhniativ Castle for the castle administration to organize local residents for an ambush in the Bodnariv forests.

In the 17th and 18th centuries, the owner of Rozhniativ and the castle was the Grand Crown Master of the Horse, the Bracław Voivode Jan Aleksander Koniecpolski, with his wife Elżbieta, née Rzewuska. After their death, the castle passed to the Podole Voivode Wacław Rzewuski.

Starting in 1830, the castle was inhabited by Count Stanislaw Skarbek, a patron of culture and the founder of the Skarbek Theatre in Lviv (now the Maria Zankovetska National Academic Ukrainian Drama Theatre). It is known that he organized theatrical performances in the castle. In the first half of the 19th century, on his initiative, the Rozhniativ Castle was rebuilt into a palace. The new building was constructed in the Neo-Gothic style with fortification motifs, featuring a high square-in-plan tower-donjon, which adjoined a round tower with machicolations. In the courtyard, gardeners created a large arboretum park. Over time, the fortress lost its defensive functions. There were two passages under the castle that led to the Batyn tract and to the Basilian Monastery.

At the beginning of the 20th century, the palace premises housed a district court, and after the World War II, the palace underwent changes: the upper part of the tower was dismantled, and only a fragment of the first tier was preserved.

The "Inventory of the Rozhniativ key verified on the ground A.D. 1759" (Polish: Inwentarz klucza Rozniatowskiego na gruncie zweryfikowany Ano Dni 1759), discovered by the historian and monument preservationist Aleksander Czołowski, is preserved in the Manuscript Division of the Lviv Stefanyk National Scientific Library of Ukraine. It mentioned that "the castle was surrounded by earthen ramparts, and fortifications were located along the perimeter of the defensive lines: an entrance gate, a wicket, a stone tower, and a rondel (bastion). In the castle courtyard, there were residential and utility rooms: a wooden residence, a building with an unknown purpose, a granary with three bins, a vestibule and an arbor above it, a bakery, a coach house, and a stable. And below the castle was a farmstead house". Thus, the defensive structure was made of wood and earth and had combined tower-wall and proto-bastion fortifications.

On the map of Friedrich von Mieg, published in 1779–1782, six objects of the castle courtyard are traced (a bridge, an entrance gate, a tower, a rondel, a residence, and a synik (probably a ridge turret), which are described in the mentioned inventory.

== Bibliography ==
- Федунків З. Рожнятівський замок: історія та архітектурно-планувальна характеристика в світлі відомих і нововиявлених джерел // «Археологія & Фортифікація України». Збірник матеріалів V Всеукраїнської науково-практичної конференції / [редкол.: В.С. Травінський (відп. ред.) та ін.]. — Кам'янець-Подільський: ТОВ «Друкарня Рута», 2015. — С. 193—199. — ISBN 978-966-2771-76-3.
- "Замок в Рожнятові". Замки, відпочинок, оздоровлення, зцілення в Галичині.
