= Volodymyr Hromnytskyi =

Ukrainian priest (1862–1938)

- Володимир Петрович Громницький
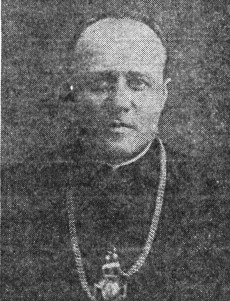
- Born: 11 August 1862; Krasne, now Kalush Raion, Ivano-Frankivsk Oblast, Ukraine
- Died: 23 November 1938 (aged 76); Ternopil
- Occupations: Priest, religious and public figure

Volodymyr Hromnytskyi (Ukrainian: Володимир Петрович Громницький; 11 August 1862 – 23 November 1938) was a Ukrainian Greek Catholic priest, Kryloshanin, religious and public figure. Founding member of the City Brotherhood. Father of Isydor Hromnytskyi, sotnyk of the Ukrainian Galician Army and commander of the railway station in Ternopil during the period of the West Ukrainian People's Republic.

== Biography ==
He was born on 11 August 1862 in Krasne in Kalush Powiat, now Kalush Raion in Ivano-Frankivsk Oblast, Ukraine.

Ordained on 15 March 1885. After ordination, he served as a priest in the parishes of Lysiatychi (1885–1888) and Zhuravno (1888–1889), and worked as an administrator in Zhuravno for a year.

In 1890, he became a priest in the Ternopil parish of the Ukrainian Greek Catholic Church (until 1893), and in 1895 he became its head (from 1893, after the death of father-dean Vasyl Fortuna, he was its administrator). He was the long-time parish priest of the Church of the Nativity of Jesus Christ in Ternopil. He participated in the organization and work of Ukrainian societies. As the head of the branch of the "Ridna Shkola" society, he promoted the activities of educational institutions: a girls' gymnasium, a student bursary, a branch of the "Prosvita" society, the Rusyn and Pedagogical societies, the "Ukrainian Bursa", the "City Brotherhood" (founding member in 1890, chairman in 1895–1921), the Sodality of Our Lady, etc.

In 1914, he was arrested by Russian occupiers and exiled to Russia. In the Ternopil parish, he introduced the Divine Liturgy of the Sacred Heart of Jesus, retreats, akathists, and Divine Services for townspeople, schoolchildren, and gymnasium students. He purchased a plot of land (on what is now Taras Shevchenko Boulevard) for the construction of a parish church (he did not have time to carry out his plan).

On 15 April 1899, the district court in Ternopil registered the first "District Credit Society" in Podillia (he was one of the initiators of its creation).

On 18 November 1918, in the Middle church, he administered the oath of allegiance to the Ukrainian state (ZUNR) to the staff of the Ternopil district military command and the commanders of its subordinate units.

Vice-dean (1898–1901), administrator (1901–1902), and dean of the Ternopil Deanery of the Ukrainian Greek Catholic Church (1901–1927); honorary member of the clergy (1903–1938) and member of the Lviv Metropolitan Consistory of the Ukrainian Greek Catholic Church (1927–1938).

He is buried in the Mykulynetskyi Cemetery in Ternopil in the family tomb.

== Memory ==
One of the streets in Ternopil is named after him.

On 18 October 2020, a monument was erected in Ternopil in honor of Hromnytskyi on the grounds of the History Department of the Ternopil Volodymyr Hnatiuk National Pedagogical University.

== Bibliography ==
- Гулько, Я. Меценат, просвітитель, церковний діяч // Тернопіль вечірній. — 2008. — 28 серп. — 2 верес. — С. VI (Тернопіль, якого вже немає).
- Гулько, Я. Найвидатніший церковний діяч і просвітитель міста // Місто. — 2013. — No. 18 (30 квіт.). — С. 15. — (Невідомий Тернопіль).
- (in Ukrainian) Кузьмович, Л., Громницький Володимир // Ternopil Encyclopedic Dictionary: in 4 v. / editorial board: H. Yavorskyi and other, Ternopil: "Zbruch", 2004, V. 1: А—Й, 696 s. — ISBN 966-528-197-6.
- Лазарович, М. Активні діячі ЗУНР на Тернопільщині // Ї. — 2010. — Ч. 63. — С. 77–90.
- Мороз, В. Він піднімав Тернопіль // RIA плюс. — 2013. — No. 5 (30 січ.). — С. 19.
- Мороз, В. «Многая літа» співала тисяча осіб // RIA плюс. — 2016. — No. 50 (14 груд.). — С. 19. — (Ретро).
