= Verbivka =

Verbivka may refer to:

== Villages ==
- Verbivka — Ivano-Frankivsk Oblast, Kalush Raion
- Verbivka — Ternopil Oblast, Chortkiv Raion
- Verbivka — Kharkiv Oblast, Balakliia Raion
- Gammalsvenskby, a former village that is now a neighbourhood in the village of Zmiivka in Beryslav Raion of Kherson Oblast

== Urban-type settlements ==
- Verbivka, Illintsi Raion — Vinnytsia Oblast, Illintsi Raion

== See also ==
- Verbiv (disambiguation)
