= Ivan Holubovskyi =

Ukrainian lawyer, writer (1878–1957)

- Іван Сильвестрович Голубовський
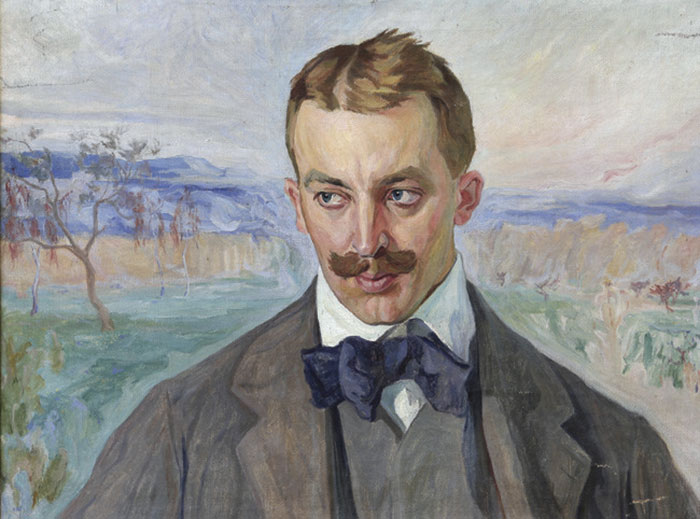
- Oleksa Novakivskyi. Portrait of Ivan Holubovskyi (1905)
- Born: Ivan Sylvestrovych Holubovskyi; 8 March 1878; Perehinske, Austria-Hungary (now Ukraine)
- Died: 17 May 1957 (aged 79); Vejprty, Czechoslovakia
- Education: Lviv University, Jagiellonian University

Ivan Holubovskyi (Ukrainian: Іван Сильвестрович Голубовський; 8 March 1878 – 17 May 1957) was a Ukrainian lawyer, writer. Doctor of Law (1907). Friend and biographer of Oleksa Novakivskyi. Born in the village of Perehinske, Ukraine, he studied law at Lviv University and graduated from the Law Faculty of the Jagiellonian University.

In the first decade of the 20th century, he worked for Galician lawyers and also served in the field court of the Austrian Army.

== Biography ==
Ivan Holubovskyi was born on 8 March 1878 in the village of Perehinske (now the rural settlement of the Perehinske Hromada in the Kalush Raion of the Ivano-Frankivsk Oblast of Ukraine).

In 1888–1900 he studied at gymnasiums in Stanyslaviv, Stryi, Lviv, and Drohobych. He studied law at Lviv University, where he attended Mykhailo Hrushevskyi's first course of lectures on the history of Eastern Europe. In 1901, he took part in the secession of Ukrainian students at Lviv University.

In 1905 he graduated from the Law Faculty of the Jagiellonian University. During his studies, he met Oleksa Novakivskyi.

From 1906 to 1911, he worked for well-known Galician lawyers in Dolyna, Kamianka-Strumylivska, Kalush, Drohobych, and others. During the World War I, he served in a field court of the Austrian Army. In 1920, he opened a law office in Lviv. Helped the Oleksa Novakivskyi Art School with financial and legal problems.

In the 1940s, the German occupation authorities of Lviv sent him and his wife Jadwiga to forced labor in Germany, where he worked as a civilian judge in Chemnitz. In 1945 to 1948, he was the manager of a nationalized German leather processing factory in Vejprty, Czechoslovakia.

Died on 17 May 1957 in Vejprty, where he was buried in the local cemetery.

=== Family ===
He and his wife Polka Jadwiga had two children: a daughter Halyna and a son Andrii.

== Works ==
Holubovskyi dedicated two novels to his friend Oleksa Novakivskyi: "Bohy za odnym stolom" (2001, Dzvin), "Rozmakhom mohutnikh kryl" (2002, with a foreword by art critic Mykola Mushynka; Oleksa Novakivskyi and his art school foundation in Lviv).

He kept the largest collection of Novakivskyi's works, including his portrait. In 1936, he participated in the preparation of the artist's posthumous exhibition organized by the Ukrainian Society of Art Supporters in Lviv (364 works of painting and graphics were presented then).

Holubovskyi was mentioned in catalogs and reviews of exhibitions of Novakivskyi's paintings from M. Mushynka's private collection held in Ukraine, Canada, Slovakia, and the United States.

== Sources ==
- Мушинка, М. Невідомий Олекса Новаківський // Svidomist, 1990, No. 3, s. 46–59.
- Волошин, Л. Іван Голубовський – приятель і однодумець Олекси Новаківського // Dzvin, 2001, Ч. 9, s. 20–21.
- У. Л. Наша обкладинка // Nashe Zyttia, 1979, No. 4, s. 10–12.
