= Krasne, Ivano-Frankivsk Oblast =

Rural locality in Ivano-Frankivsk Oblast, Ukraine

Krasne Красне
- Location in Ivano-Frankivsk Oblast Krasne (Ukraine)
- Coordinates: 48°51′20″N 24°17′1″E
- Country: Ukraine
- Oblast: Ivano-Frankivsk Oblast
- Raion: Kalush Raion
- Hromada: Perehinske settlement hromada
- Time zone: UTC+2 (EET)
  - Summer (DST): UTC+3 (EEST)
- Postal code: 77660

Krasne (Ukrainian: Красне) is a village in the Perehinske settlement hromada of the Kalush Raion of Ivano-Frankivsk Oblast in Ukraine.

== History ==
The first written mention of the village was in 1450.

On 19 July 2020, as a result of the administrative-territorial reform and liquidation of the Rozhniativ Raion, the village became part of the Kalush Raion.

== Religion ==
- Saint Nicholas church (1770, wooden)

== Notable residents ==
- Volodymyr Hromnytskyi (1862–1938), Ukrainian Greek Catholic priest, Kryloshanin, religious and public figure

== Bibliography ==
- "Krasna 6". Geographical Dictionary of the Kingdom of Poland (in Polish). 4. Warszawa: Kasa im. Józefa Mianowskiego. 1883. p. 620.
