= Broshniv-Osada =

Rural locality in Ivano-Frankivsk Oblast, Ukraine

Broshniv-Osada Брошнів-Осада
- Rural settlement
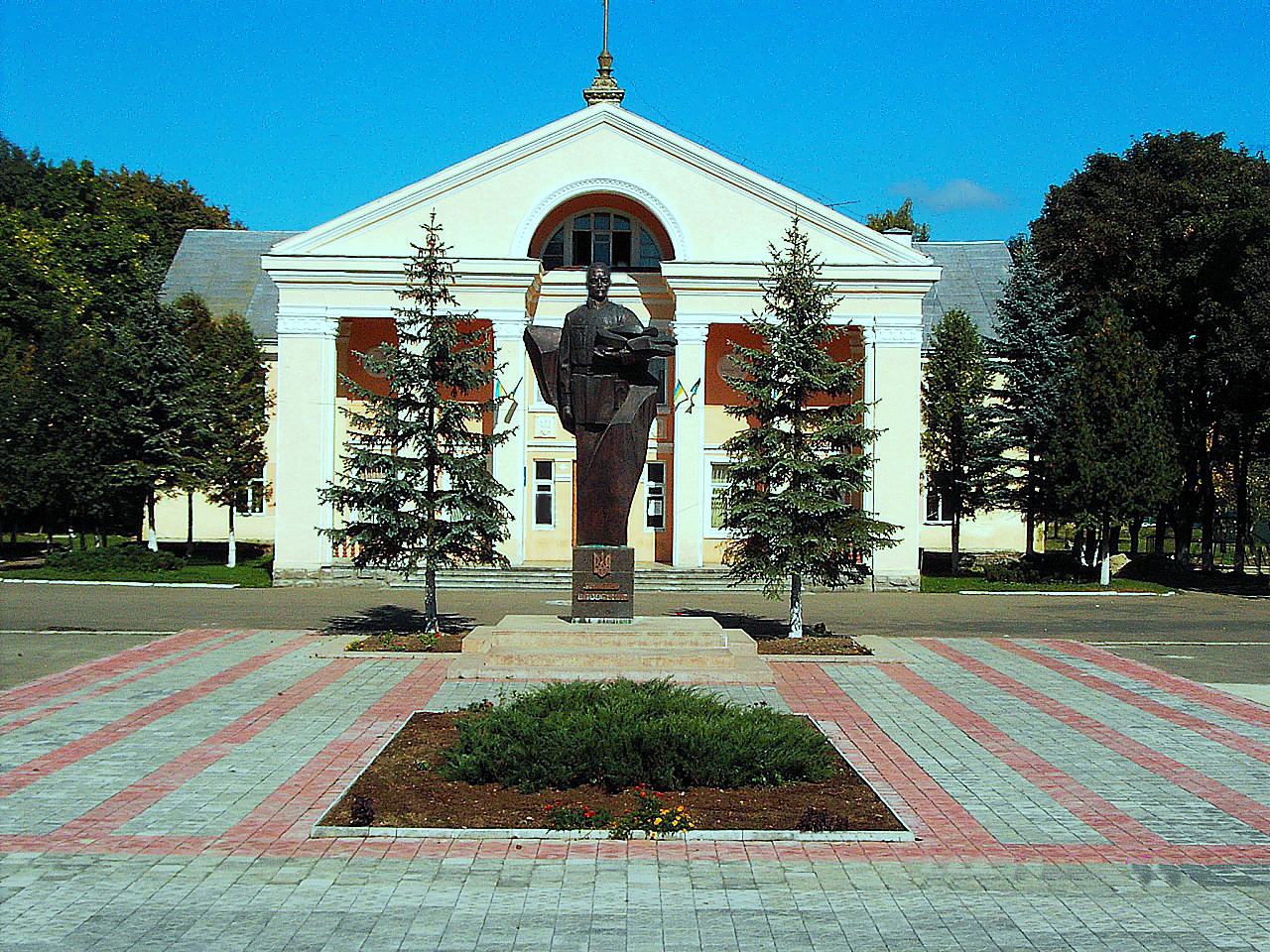
- Monument to Dmytro Vitovsky in front of the Prosvita building

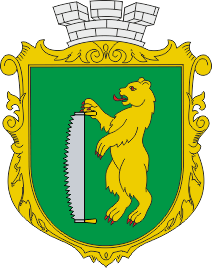
- Coat of arms

- Location within Ivano-Frankivsk Oblast Location within Ukraine
- Coordinates: 48°59′38″N 24°11′40″E
- Country: Ukraine
- Oblast: Ivano-Frankivsk Oblast
- Raion: Kalush Raion
- Established: 1890

Government
  - Mayor: Taras Manoryk

Area
  - Total: 5.04 km^{2} (1.95 sq mi)

Population (2022)
  - Total: 5,419
  - Density: 1,080/km^{2} (2,780/sq mi)
- Postal code: 77611-77613
- Area code: +380 3474-
- Website: broshniv.info

Broshniv-Osada (Ukrainian: Бро́шнів-Оса́да) is a rural settlement in Kalush Raion, Ivano-Frankivsk Oblast, western Ukraine. It hosts the administration of Broshniv-Osada settlement hromada, one of the hromadas of Ukraine. Population: 5,419 (2022 estimate).

== History ==
The first written record of its mention dates from 1890.

Until 18 July 2020, Broshniv-Osada belonged to Rozhniativ Raion. The raion was abolished in July 2020 as part of the administrative reform of Ukraine, which reduced the number of raions of Ivano-Frankivsk Oblast to six. The area of Rozhniativ Raion was merged into Kalush Raion.

Until 26 January 2024, Broshniv-Osada was designated urban-type settlement. On this day, a new law entered into force which abolished this status, and Broshniv-Osada became a rural settlement.

== Economy ==
Broshniv has traditionally served as a centre of sawmill industry, with the wood being delivered by narrow-gauge railways from the nearby Gorgany massive.

== Notable people ==
- Roman Shpek (born 1954), Ukrainian diplomat and economist
- Rostyslav Voloshynovych (born 1991), Ukrainian footballer
- Taras Voznyak (born 1957), Ukrainian culturologist

== Gallery ==
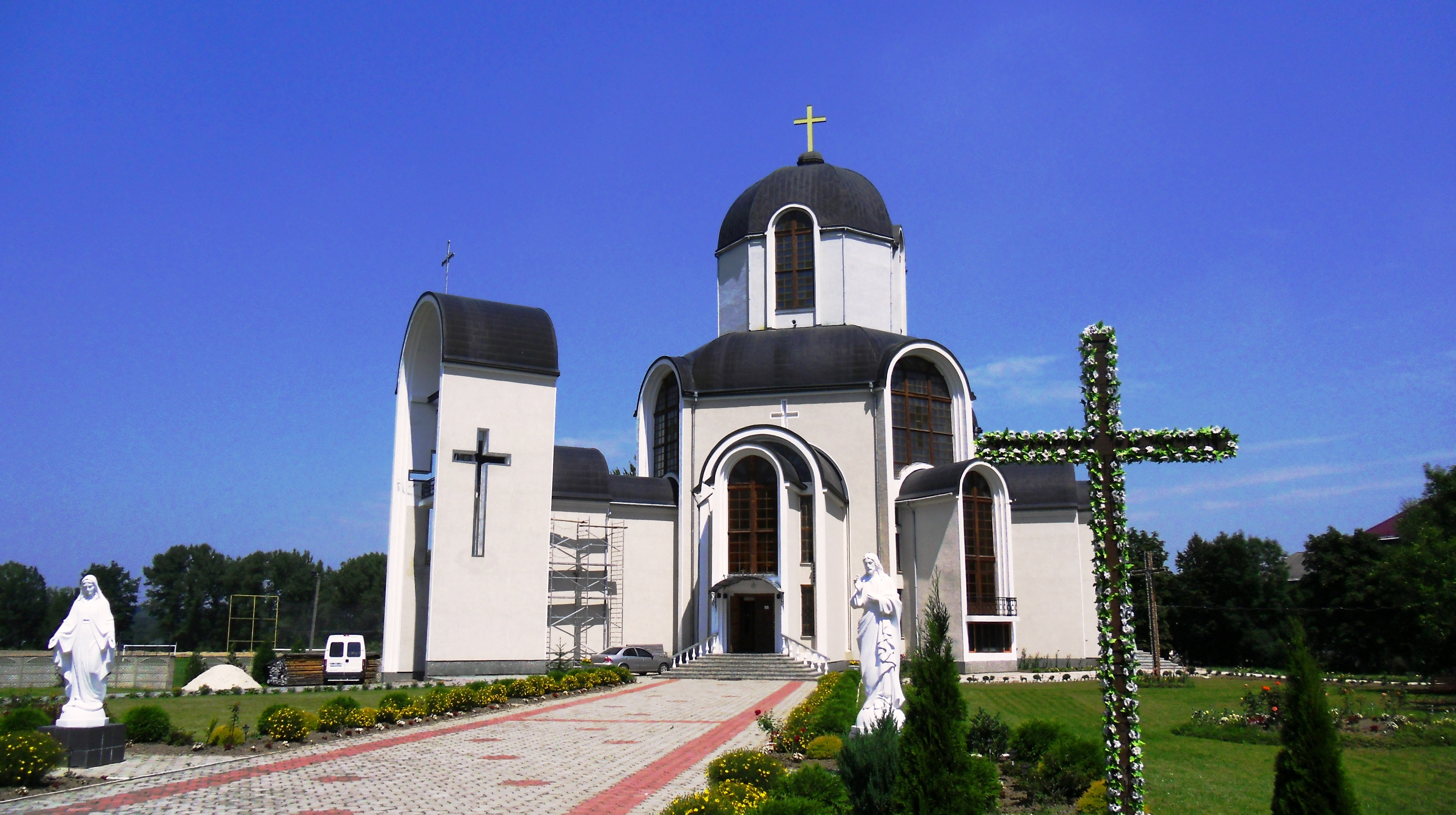
Greek-Catholic Church

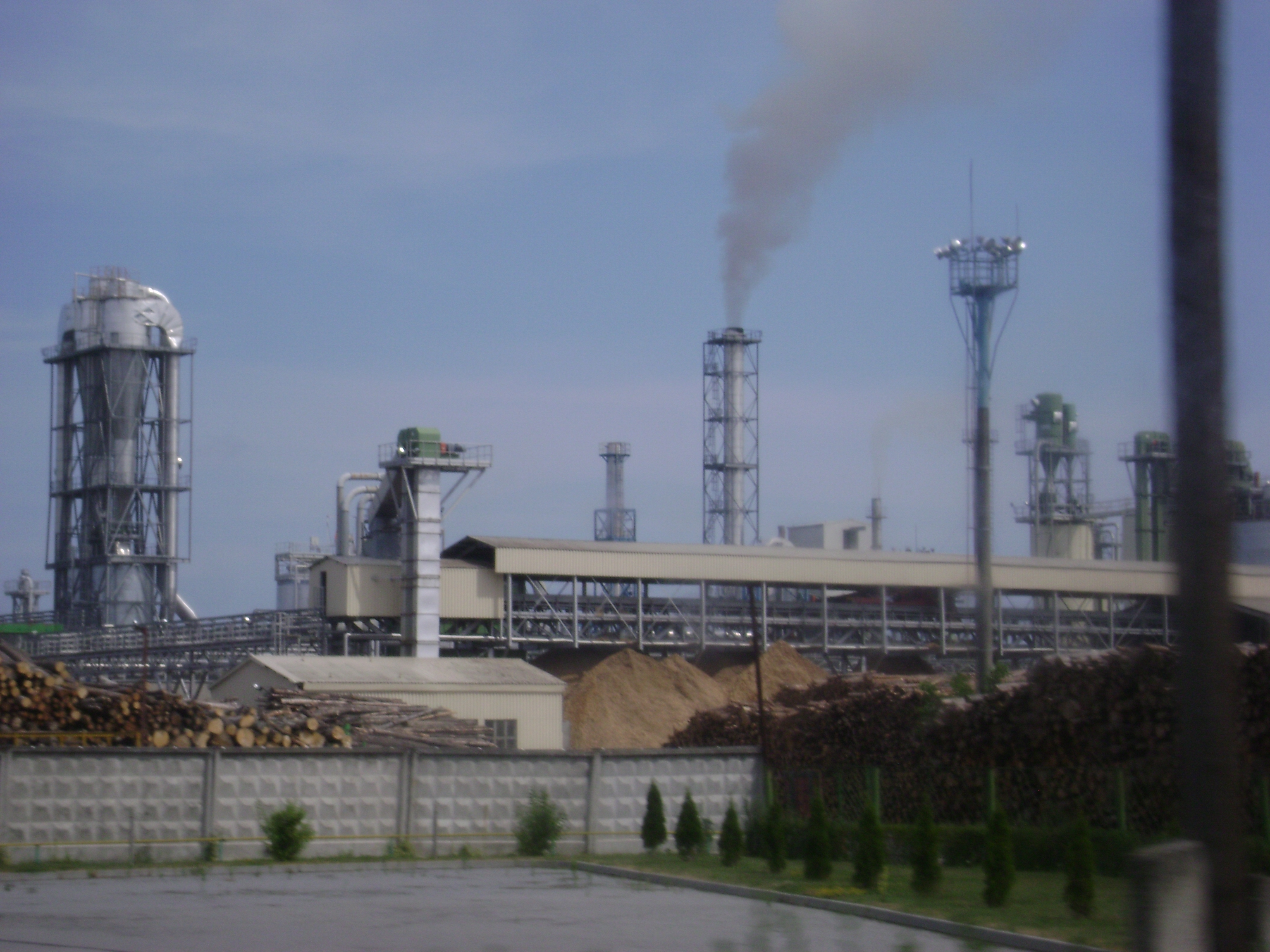
A sawmill in Broshniv
