= Yasen =

Rural locality in Ivano-Frankivsk Oblast, Ukraine

Yasen Ясень
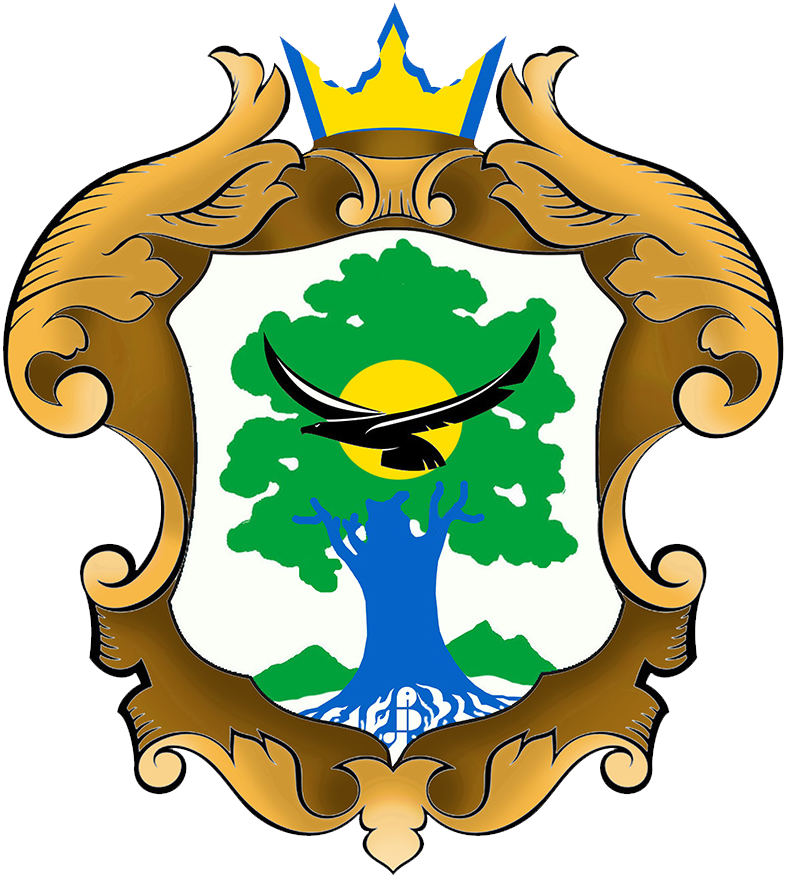
- Coat of arms

- Location in Ivano-Frankivsk Oblast
- Coordinates: 48°44′29″N 24°10′17″E
- Country: Ukraine
- Oblast: Ivano-Frankivsk Oblast
- Raion: Kalush Raion
- Hromada: Perehinske settlement hromada
- Time zone: UTC+2 (EET)
  - Summer (DST): UTC+3 (EEST)
- Postal code: 77673

Yasen (Ukrainian: Ясень) is a village in the Perehinske settlement hromada of the Kalush Raion of Ivano-Frankivsk Oblast in Ukraine.

== History ==
On 20 September 1597, Stanisław Żółkiewski (he had been the Kalush starosta from about 1588) granted the settlers (Petro Kosa, Yurii Pavlishak, Vasyl Leshekal, and others) permission to found a village of the same name in the Yasen tract. According to the localization charter, residents of the new settlement were exempt from paying taxes for three years. The inhabitants of Yasen were granted the status of knez (heads of the village community under the Vlach law) and were entitled to occupy three plots of land in the village.

On 17 July 2020, as a result of the administrative-territorial reform and liquidation of the Rozhniativ Raion, the village became part of the Kalush Raion.

== Notable residents ==
- Ivan Vahylevych (1811–1866), Ukrainian Romantic poet, philologist, and ethnographer of the Galician revival in Western Ukraine

== Sources ==
- "Jasień (1)". Geographical Dictionary of the Kingdom of Poland (in Polish). 3. Warszawa: Kasa im. Józefa Mianowskiego. 1882. p. 468.
