= Voznyak =

Voznyak is a Ukrainian: Возняк surname. Notable people with the surname include:

- Anastasiya Voznyak (born 1998), Ukrainian rhythmic gymnast
- Ihor Voznyak (born 1951), Archbishop of Lviv
- Taras Voznyak (born 1957), Ukrainian writer
