= Vilshanytsia =

Vilshanytsia (Ukrainian: Вільшаниця) may refer to:

- Velyka Vilshanytsia, a village in the Lviv Oblast
- Vilshanytsia, a former village in the Lviv Oblast
- The Vilshanytsia River in the Lviv Oblast
- Vilshanytsia, a village in the Ivano-Frankivsk Oblast
- Vilshanytsia, a village in the Khmelnytskyi Oblast
- Olszanica, a village in the Podkarpackie Voivodeship
