= Verbiv =

Verbiv is the name of two villages in Ternopil Oblast, Ukraine:

- Verbiv, Berezhany Raion
- Verbiv, Pidhaitsi Raion

== See also ==
- Verbivka (disambiguation)
