= Svarychiv =

Rural locality in Ivano-Frankivsk Oblast, Ukraine

Coordinates: 48°58′N 24°12′E

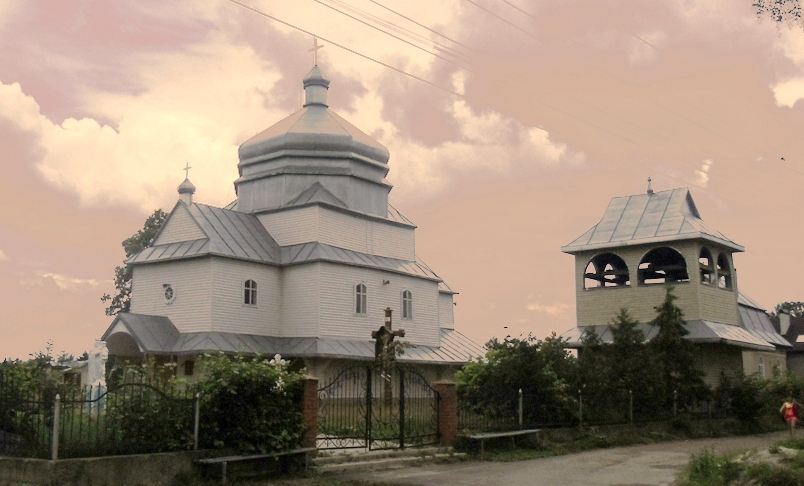
Svarychiv. The Church of Entering the Blessed Virgin Mary in the Temple (1804).

Svarychiv (Ukrainian: Сва́ричів, Polish: Swaryczów) is a village in Kalush Raion in Ivano-Frankivsk Oblast (province) of western Ukraine. It belongs to Rozhniativ settlement hromada, one of the hromadas of Ukraine.

The population on the all-Ukrainian population census 2001 was 5,039 people. It occupies an area of 28,189 km^{2}. Postal code – 77605. Telephone code – 0-3474.

== History ==
The first mention of Svarychiv dates from the year 1648.

Until 18 July 2020, Svarychiv belonged to Rozhniativ Raion. It was the biggest settlement in the raion. The raion was abolished in July 2020 as part of the administrative reform of Ukraine, which reduced the number of raions of Ivano-Frankivsk Oblast to six. The area of Rozhniativ Raion was merged into Kalush Raion.

== Local Council ==
77665, Ivano-Frankivsk Region, Rozhniativ Area, Svarychiv, Dovha Street, 134.

== Notable people ==
- Taras Voznyak (born 1957) – Ukrainian cultural scientist
- Vasyl Mykolaiovych Voloshchuk – violinist, artist vocal genre, the honoured artist of Ukraine, laureate of many contests and festivals.
- Andrii Matsevko – Ukrainian singer, participant of talent shows Ukraine's Got Talent and Ukrainian X-Factor
