= Verbivka, Ivano-Frankivsk Oblast =

Rural locality in Ivano-Frankivsk Oblast, Ukraine

Verbivka Вербівка
- Village
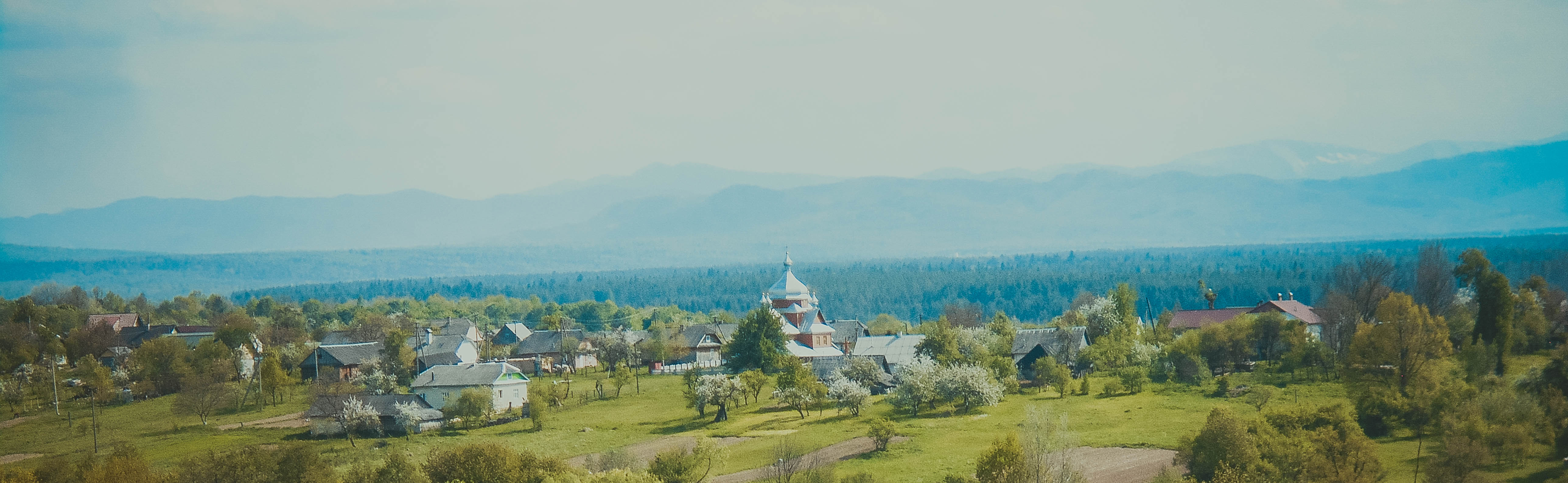
- Skyline of the village with its historic wooden church
- Interactive map of Verbivka
- Coordinates: 48°53′50″N 24°15′47″E
- Country: Ukraine
- Oblast: Ivano-Frankivsk Oblast
- District: Kalush Raion

Population
  - Total: 1,038
- Time zone: UTC+2 (EET)
  - Summer (DST): UTC+3 (EEST)
- Postal code: 77634
- Area code: +380 3474

Verbivka (Ukrainian: Вербівка) is a village in Kalush Raion in Ivano-Frankivsk Oblast (province) of western Ukraine, founded in 1674. It belongs to Rozhniativ settlement hromada, one of the hromadas of Ukraine.

The first name of the village is Ldziany.

A local monument is the wooden church of the Cathedral of the Blessed Virgin Mary in 1807.

Until 18 July 2020, Verbivka belonged to Rozhniativ Raion. It was the biggest settlement in the raion. The raion was abolished in July 2020 as part of the administrative reform of Ukraine, which reduced the number of raions of Ivano-Frankivsk Oblast to six. The area of Rozhniativ Raion was merged into Kalush Raion.
