= Kurov =

- Municipality
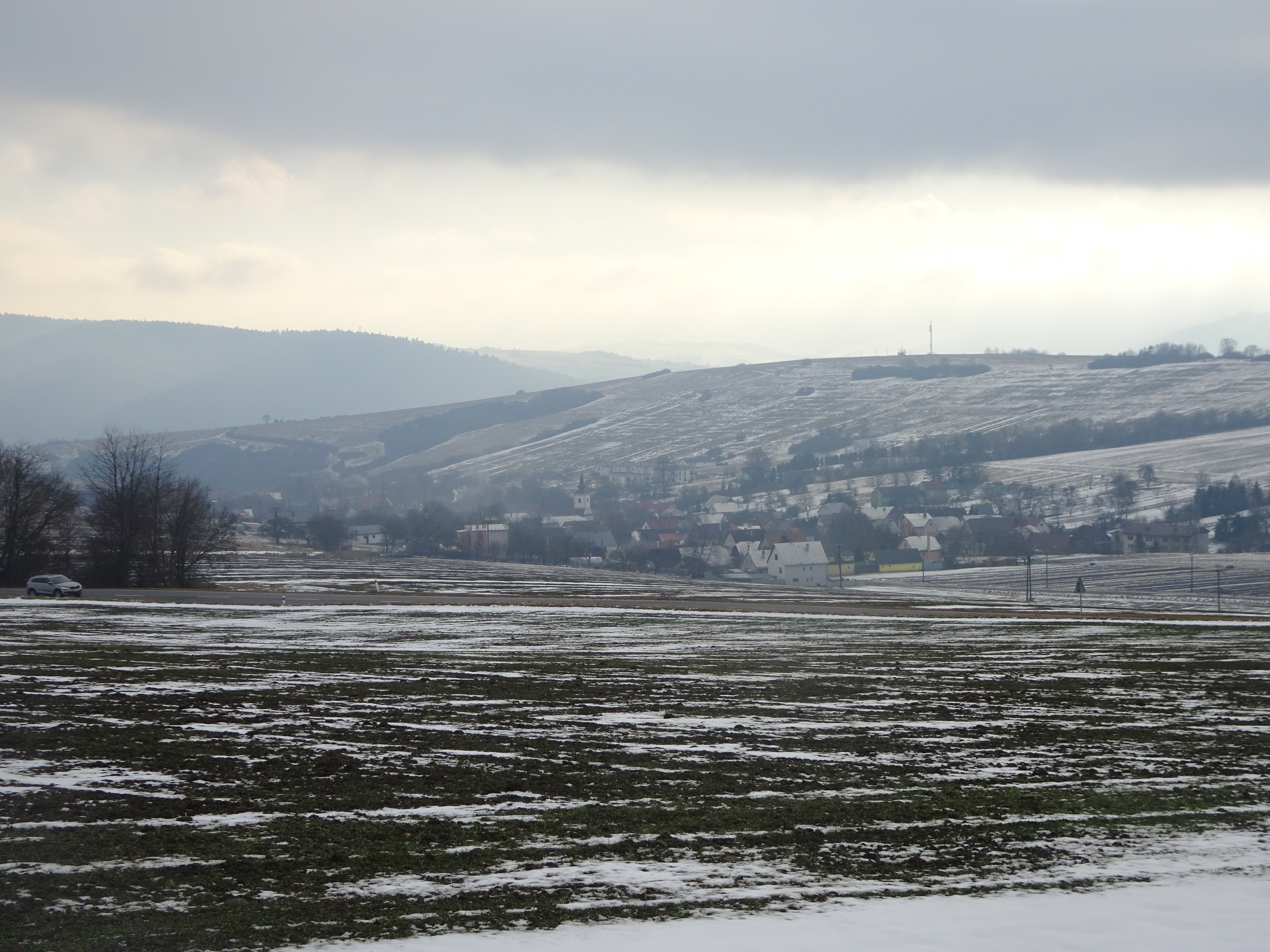

- Flag

- Location of Kurov in the Prešov Region Location of Kurov in Slovakia
- Coordinates: 49.33°N 21.13°E
- Country: Slovakia
- Region: Prešov Region
- District: Bardejov District
- First mentioned: 1332

Area
  - Total: 11.86 km^{2} (4.58 sq mi)
- Elevation: 399 m (1,309 ft)

Population (2025)
  - Total: 739
- Time zone: UTC+1 (CET)
  - Summer (DST): UTC+2 (CEST)
- Postal code: 860 4
- Area code: +421 54
- Vehicle registration plate (until 2022): BJ
- Website: kurov.sk

Kurov is a village and municipality in Bardejov District in the Prešov Region of north-east Slovakia.

== History ==
In historical records, the village was first mentioned in 1332.

== Geography ==
The municipality lies at an altitude of 399 metres (1,309 ft) and covers an area of 11.86 km^{2} (4.58 sq mi) (2025).

== Population ==
Population statistic (10 years)
Year	1995	2005	2015	2025
Count	558	560	613	739
Difference		+0.35%	+9.46%	+20.55%

Population statistic
Year	2024	2025
Count	727	739
Difference		+1.65%

It has a population of 739 people (31 December 2025).

=== Ethnicity ===
Census 2021 (1+ %)
Ethnicity	Number	Fraction
Slovak	626	92.6%
Romani	200	29.58%
Rusyn	193	28.55%
Ukrainian	12	1.77%
Total	676	

In year 2021 was 676 people by ethnicity 626 as Slovak, 200 as Romani, 193 as Rusyn, 12 as Ukrainian, 6 as Not found out, 2 as Czech and 1 as German.

Note on population: The difference values of population numbers in the table "Population statistic" and in the sections "Ethnicity" & "Religion" is caused by the use of various statistical methods.

A significant portion of the municipality's population consists of the local Roma community. In 2019, they constituted an estimated 40% of the local population, concentrated in a settlement on the municipality's edge.

=== Religion ===
Census 2021 (1+ %)
Religion	Number	Fraction
Eastern Orthodox Church	304	44.97%
Greek Catholic Church	276	40.83%
Roman Catholic Church	48	7.1%
None	26	3.85%
Evangelical Church	12	1.78%
Total	676	

In year 2021 was 676 people by religion 304 from Eastern Orthodox Church, 276 from Greek Catholic Church, 48 from Roman Catholic Church, 26 from None, 12 from Evangelical Church, 5 from Not found out, 3 from Other, 1 from Other and not ascertained christian church and 1 from Jehovah's Witnesses.

== Notable residents ==
- Mikuláš Mušinka (1936–2024), Slovak folklorist and Ukrainian studies specialist, art historian, literary critic and bibliographer of Ukrainian (Lemko) origin
