= Perehinske settlement hromada =

Hromada in Ivano-Frankivsk Oblast, Ukraine

Perehinske settlement hromada Перегінська селищна громада
- Hromada
- Interactive map of Perehinske settlement hromada
- Country: Ukraine
- Oblast: Ivano-Frankivsk
- Raion: Kalush
- Admin. center: Perehinske

Area
  - Total: 6,696 km^{2} (2,585 sq mi)

Population (2020)
  - Total: 23,887
  - Density: 3.567/km^{2} (9.239/sq mi)
- CATOTTG code: UA26060210000091421
- Settlements: 16
- Rural settlements: 1
- Villages: 15
- Website: perehinska-gromada.gov.ua

Perehinske settlement hromada (Ukrainian: Перегінська селищна громада) is a hromada in Ukraine, in Kalush Raion of Ivano-Frankivsk Oblast. The administrative center is the rural settlement of Perehinske.

== Settlements ==
The hromada consists of 1 rural settlement (Perehinske) and 15 villages:

- Babske
- Hrynkiv
- Zakernychne
- Krasne
- Kuzmynets
- Lazy
- Lovahy
- Nebyliv
- Osmoloda
- Pohar
- Slyvky
- Sloboda-Nebylivska
- Turivka
- Cherepyna
- Yasen
