= Broshniv-Osada settlement hromada =

Hromada in Ivano-Frankivsk Oblast, Ukraine

Broshniv-Osada settlement hromada Брошнів-Осадська селищна громада
- Hromada
- Interactive map of Broshniv-Osada settlement hromada
- Country: Ukraine
- Oblast: Ivano-Frankivsk
- Raion: Kalush
- Admin. center: Broshniv-Osada

Area
  - Total: 47.22 km^{2} (18.23 sq mi)

Population (2018)
  - Total: 10,139
  - Density: 214.7/km^{2} (556.1/sq mi)
- CATOTTG code: UA26060030000011364
- Settlements: 5
- Rural settlements: 1
- Villages: 4
- Website: broshniv-osadska-gromada.gov.ua

Broshniv-Osada settlement hromada (Ukrainian: Брошнів-Осадська селищна громада) is a hromada in Ukraine, in Kalush Raion of Ivano-Frankivsk Oblast. The administrative center is the rural settlement of Broshniv-Osada.

== Settlements ==
The hromada consists of 1 rural settlement (Broshniv-Osada) and 4 villages:

- Broshniv
- Kadobna
- Krekhovychi
- Rakiv
