= Church of the Nativity of Jesus Christ, Ternopil =

Church in Ternopil, Ukraine

Church of the Nativity of Jesus Christ
- Церква Різдва Христового (Середня)
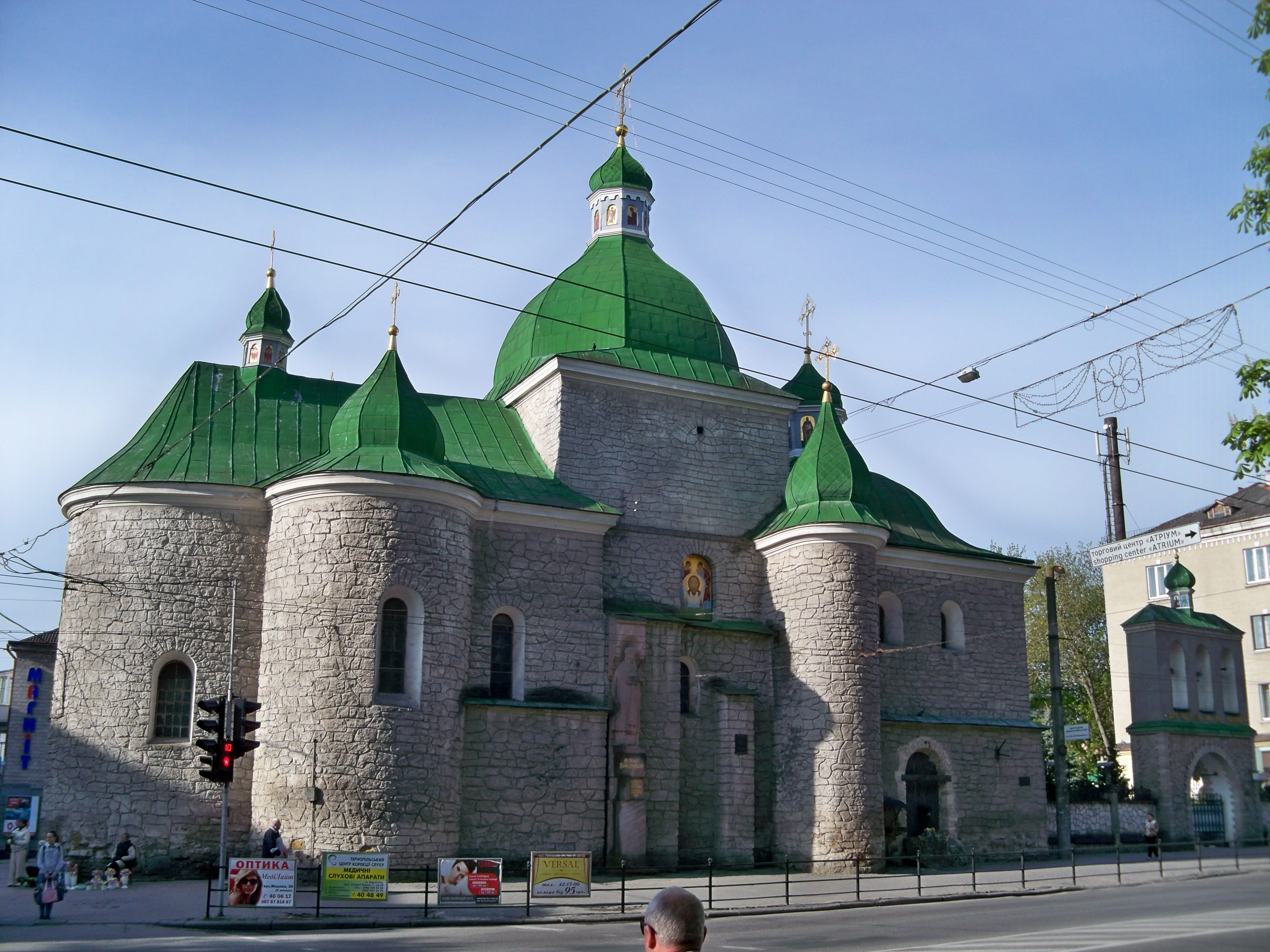

- Location within Ternopil Oblast

Religion
- Affiliation: Orthodox Church of Ukraine

Location
- Location: Ternopil, Ukraine
- Coordinates: 49°33′12″N 25°35′41″E

Immovable Monument of National Significance of Ukraine
- Official name: Воскресенська церква (мур.) (Resurrection Church (stone))
- Type: Architecture
- Reference no.: 190033

The Church of the Nativity of Jesus Christ (Ukrainian: Церква Різдва Христового) is a historical fortified parish church located in the center of Ternopil, Ukraine, at 22 Ruska Street. It belongs to the architectural style known as a conch church. It has been declared a monument of architecture of national significance (protection number 190033).

== History ==
The Church of the Nativity of Jesus Christ was built as an Orthodox church from dressed sandstone blocks between 1602 and 1608 by the builder Leontii. It is situated in the old part of the city and is architecturally interesting in both its structure and interior furnishings.

The church houses the miraculous Icon of the Ternopil Mother of God.

For a time, it served as a Greek Catholic church, and later as the deanery church of the Greek Catholic Metropolia of Halych. From the time of the so-called Synod of Lviv (1946), it was under the administration of the Russian Orthodox Church. After the collapse of the USSR, it belonged to the Ukrainian Autocephalous Orthodox Church, and from 2018, it has been under the jurisdiction of the Orthodox Church of Ukraine.

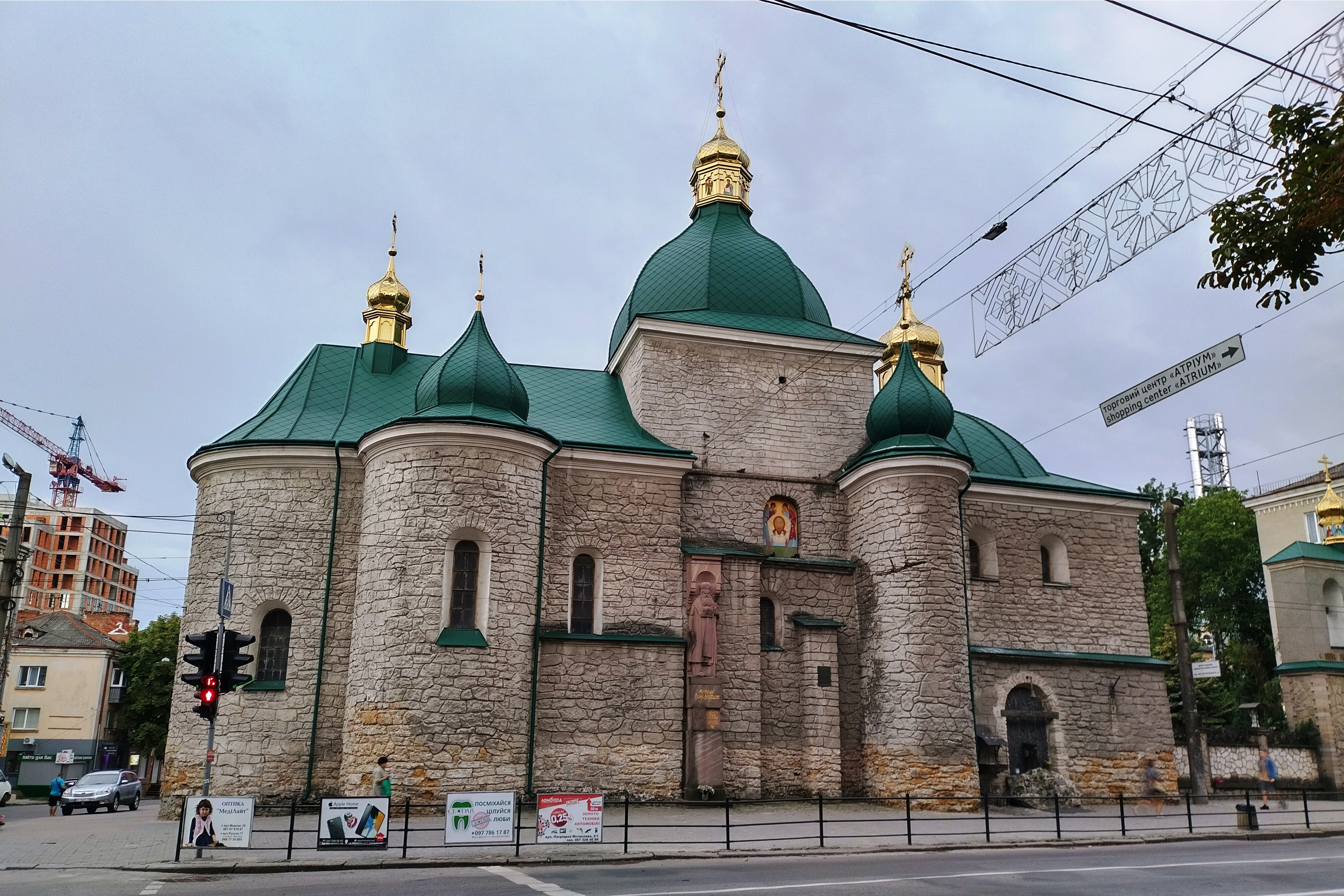

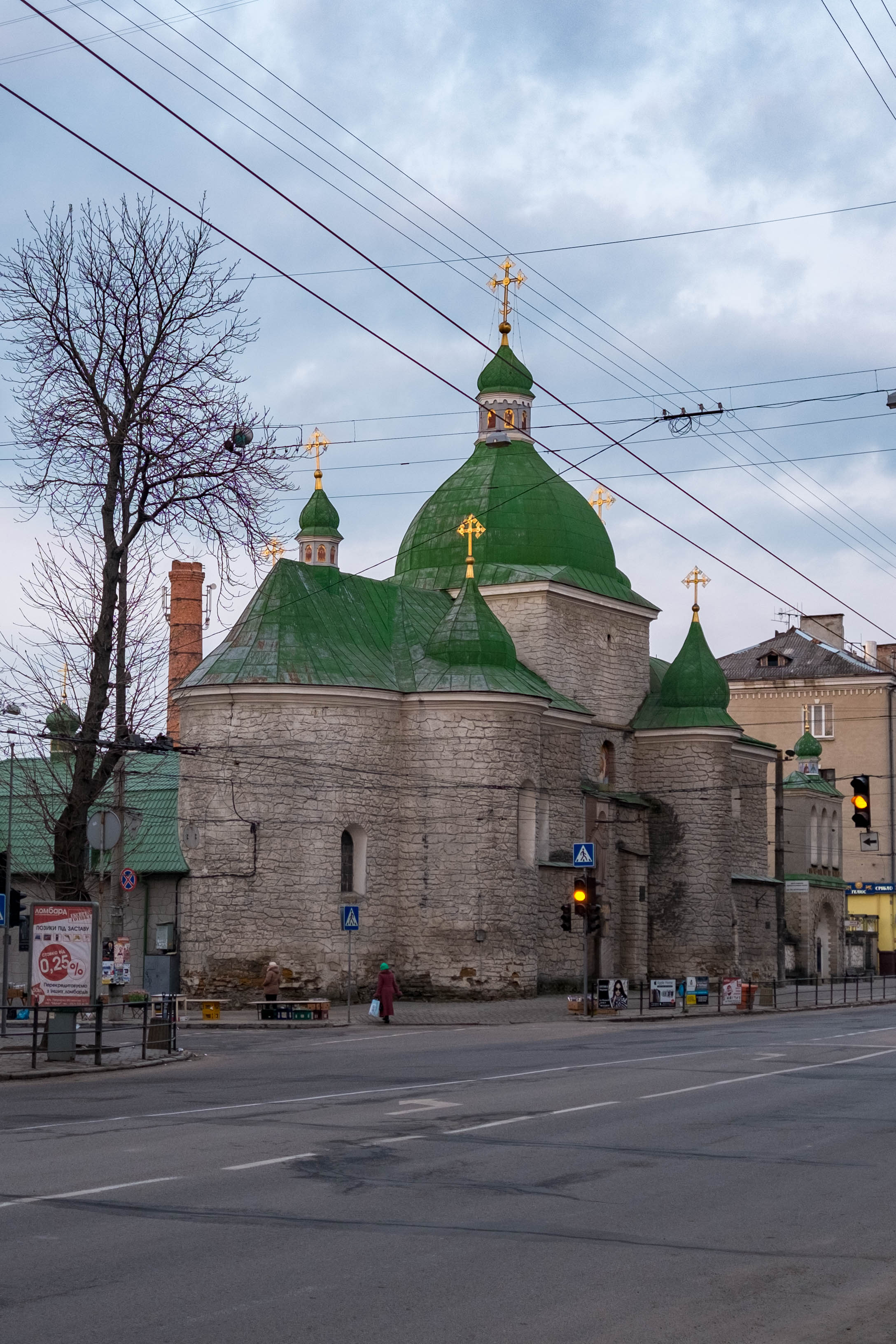

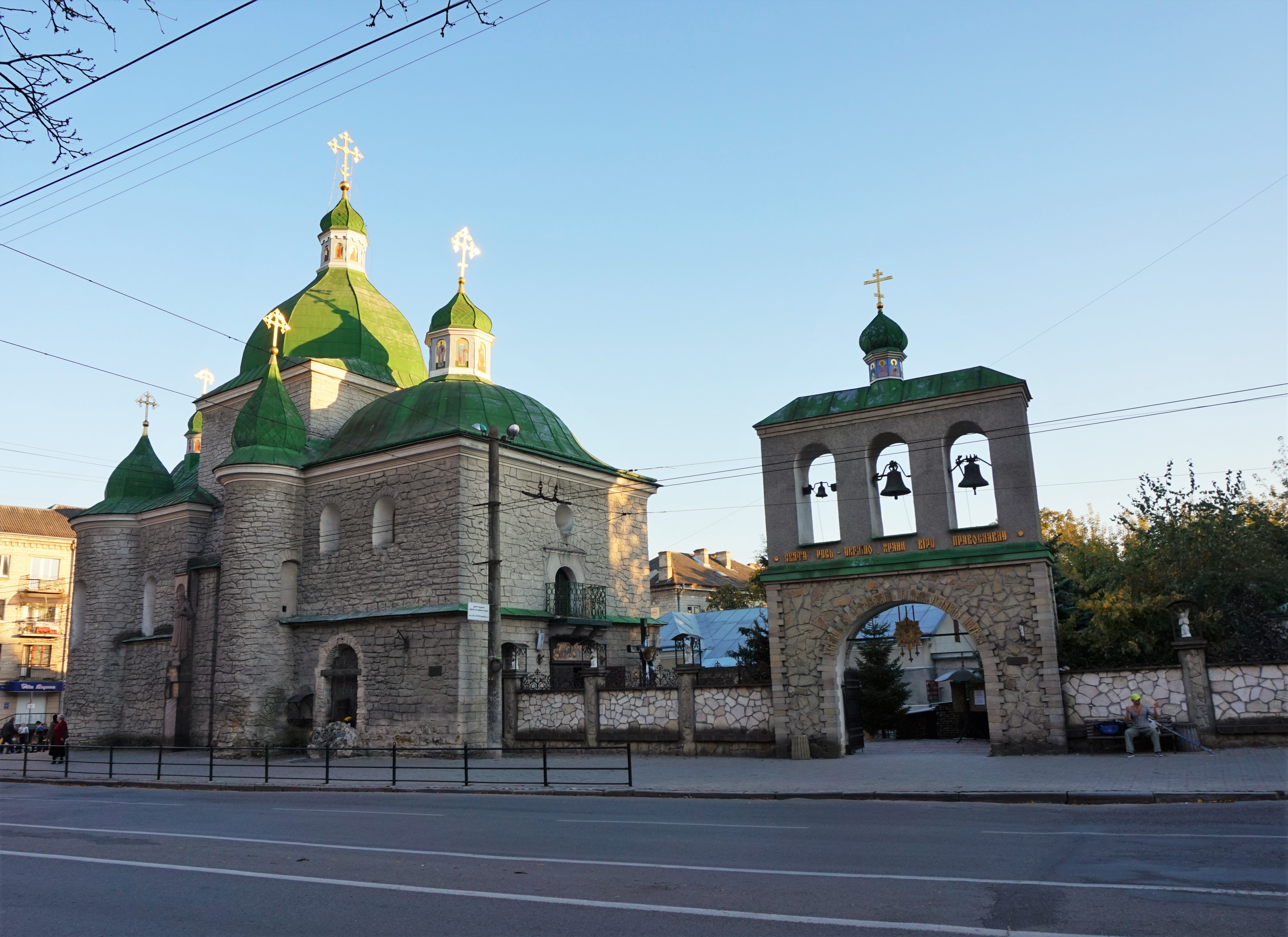

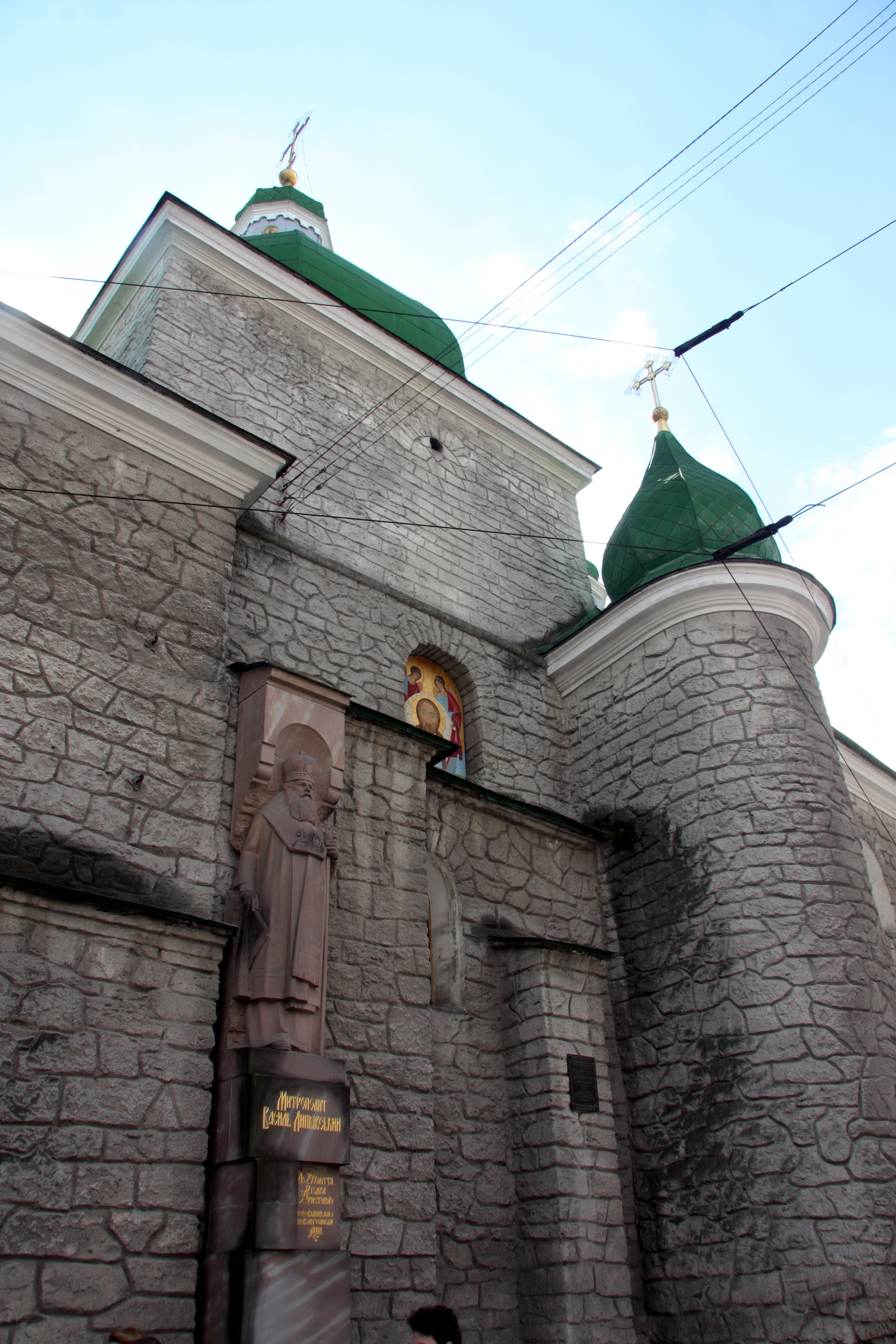

== Bibliography ==
- Grzegorz Rąkowski: Przewodnik krajoznawczo - historyczny po Ukrainie zachodniej. Cz. II: Podole. Pruszków: Oficyna Wydawnicza "Rewasz", 2005, s. 139–140. ISBN 83-89181-46-5.
- Бойцун Л. Церква Різдва Христового // Старовинні церкви Тернополя / Ї. — 2010. — Ч. 63.
- Dmytro Blazejowskyj: Historical Šematism of the Archeparchy of L'viv (1832—1944). Cz. I. Kijów : Publishing house «KM Akademia», 2004, 1103 ss., s. 759—760. ISBN 966-518-225-0.
- (in Ukrainian) Гудима А., Івахів Г., Різдва Христового Церква (Середня) // Ternopil Encyclopedic Dictionary: in 4 v. / editorial board: H. Yavorskyi and other, Ternopil: "Zbruch", 2008, V. 3: П—Я, S. 182–183. — ISBN 978-966-528-279-2.
