= Rozhniativ settlement hromada =

Hromada in Ivano-Frankivsk Oblast, Ukraine

Rozhniativ settlement hromada Рожнятівська селищна громада
- Hromada
- Interactive map of Rozhniativ settlement hromada
- Country: Ukraine
- Oblast: Ivano-Frankivsk
- Raion: Kalush
- Admin. center: Rozhniativ

Area
  - Total: 171.4 km^{2} (66.2 sq mi)

Population (2020)
  - Total: 20,277
  - Density: 118.3/km^{2} (306.4/sq mi)
- CATOTTG code: UA26060230000053464
- Settlements: 10
- Rural settlements: 1
- Villages: 9
- Website: rozhnrada.gov.ua

Rozhniativ settlement hromada (Ukrainian: Рожнятівська селищна громада) is a hromada in Ukraine, in Kalush Raion of Ivano-Frankivsk Oblast. The administrative center is the rural settlement of Rozhniativ.

== Settlements ==
The hromada consists of 1 rural settlement (Rozhniativ) and 9 villages:

- Verbivka
- Verkhnii Strutyn
- Kamin
- Nyzhnii Strutyn
- Petranka
- Rivnia
- Svarychiv
- Sloboda-Rivnianska
- Topilske
