= Rozhniativ Raion =

Former subdivision of Ivano-Frankivsk Oblast, Ukraine

Rozhniativ Raion Рожнятівський район
- Raion
- Rozhniativskyi raion
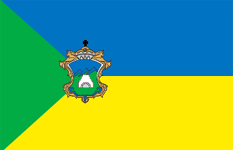
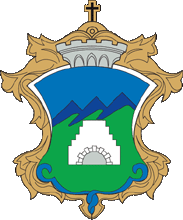
- Flag Coat of arms

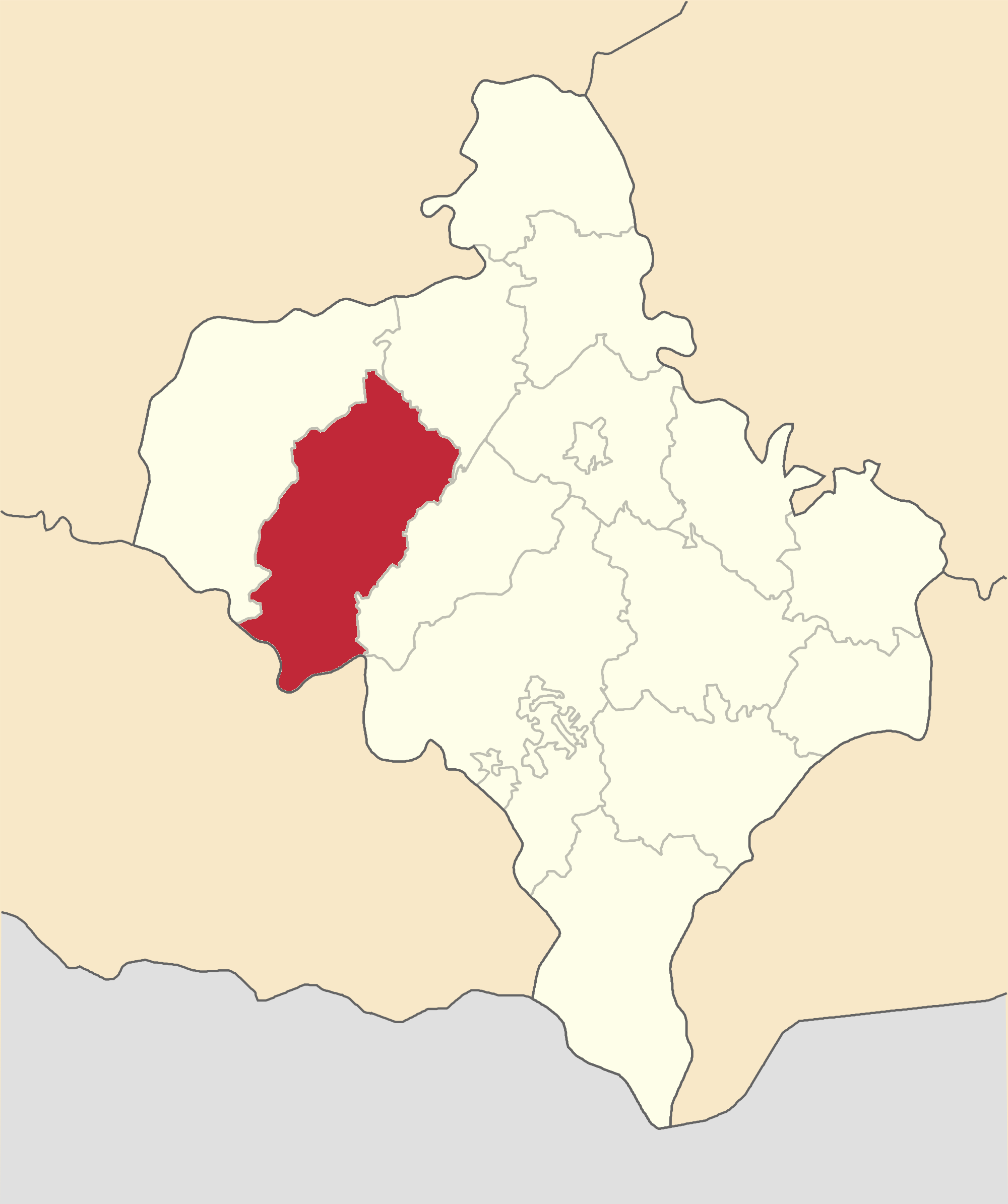
- Coordinates: 48°45′29″N 24°4′29″E
- Country: Ukraine
- Region: Ivano-Frankivsk Oblast
- Established: 4 January 1965
- Disestablished: 18 July 2020
- Admin. center: Rozhniativ
- Subdivisions: List: — city councils; — settlement councils; — rural councils; Number of localities: — cities; — urban-type settlements; — villages; — rural settlements

Population (2020)
  - Total: 71,707
- Time zone: UTC+02:00 (EET)
  - Summer (DST): UTC+03:00 (EEST)
- Area code: +380

Rozhniativ Raion (Ukrainian: Рожнятівський район, romanized: Rožnjativs'kyj rajon) was a raion (district) of Ivano-Frankivsk Oblast (region). The urban-type settlement of Rozhniativ was the administrative center of the raion. The raion was abolished on 18 July 2020 as part of the administrative reform of Ukraine, which reduced the number of raions of Ivano-Frankivsk Oblast to six. Rozhniativ Raion, Dolyna Raion and Kalush Raion were amalgamated. The area of Rozhniativ Raion was merged into Kalush Raion. The year 2020 population estimate for Rozhniativ Raion was 71,707 (2020 est.).

== Subdivisions ==
At the time of disestablishment, the raion consisted of five hromadas:

- Broshniv-Osada settlement hromada with the administration in the urban-type settlement of Broshniv-Osada;
- Duba rural hromada with the administration in the selo of Duba;
- Perehinske settlement hromada with the administration in the urban-type settlement of Perehinske;
- Rozhniativ settlement hromada with the administration in Rozhniativ;
- Spas rural hromada with the administration in the selo of Spas.

== Settlements ==
The region did not have cities, however there were three urban-type settlements.

- Broshniv-Osada
- Perehinske
- Rozhniativ
