= Velyka Vilshanytsia =

Rural locality in Lviv Oblast, Ukraine

Velyka Vilshanytsia Велика Вільшаниця
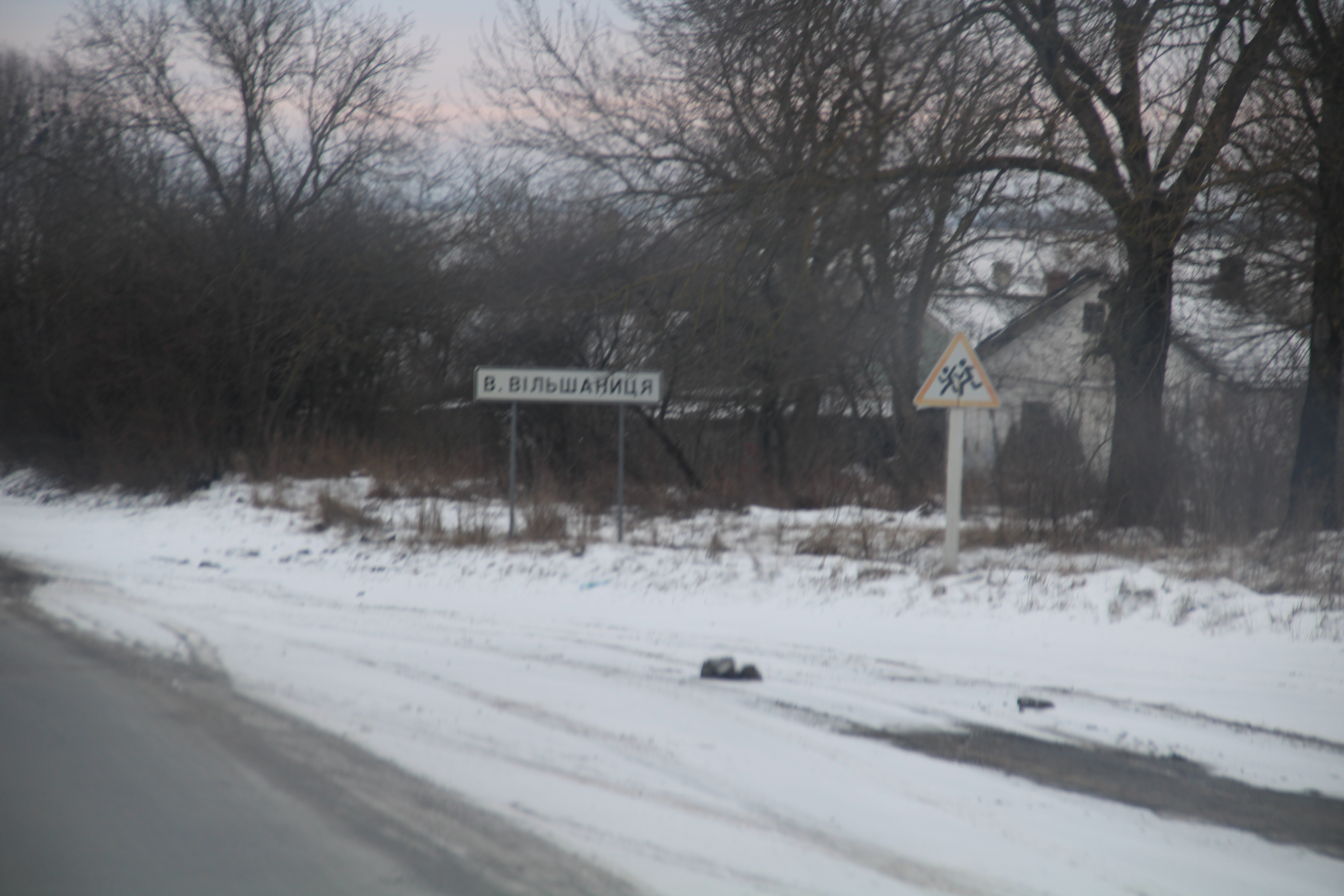
- Entrance to the village

- Location in Lviv Oblast Velyka Vilshanytsia (Ukraine)
- Coordinates: 49°48′25″N 24°39′46″E
- Country: Ukraine
- Oblast: Lviv Oblast
- Raion: Zolochiv Raion
- Hromada: Zolochiv urban hromada
- Time zone: UTC+2 (EET)
  - Summer (DST): UTC+3 (EEST)
- Postal code: 80732

Velyka Vilshanytsia, (Note: Ukrainian: Велика Вільшаниця) also known as Vilshanytsia, (Note: Ukrainian: Вільшаниця) is a village in the Zolochiv urban hromada of the Zolochiv Raion of Lviv Oblast in Ukraine.

== History ==
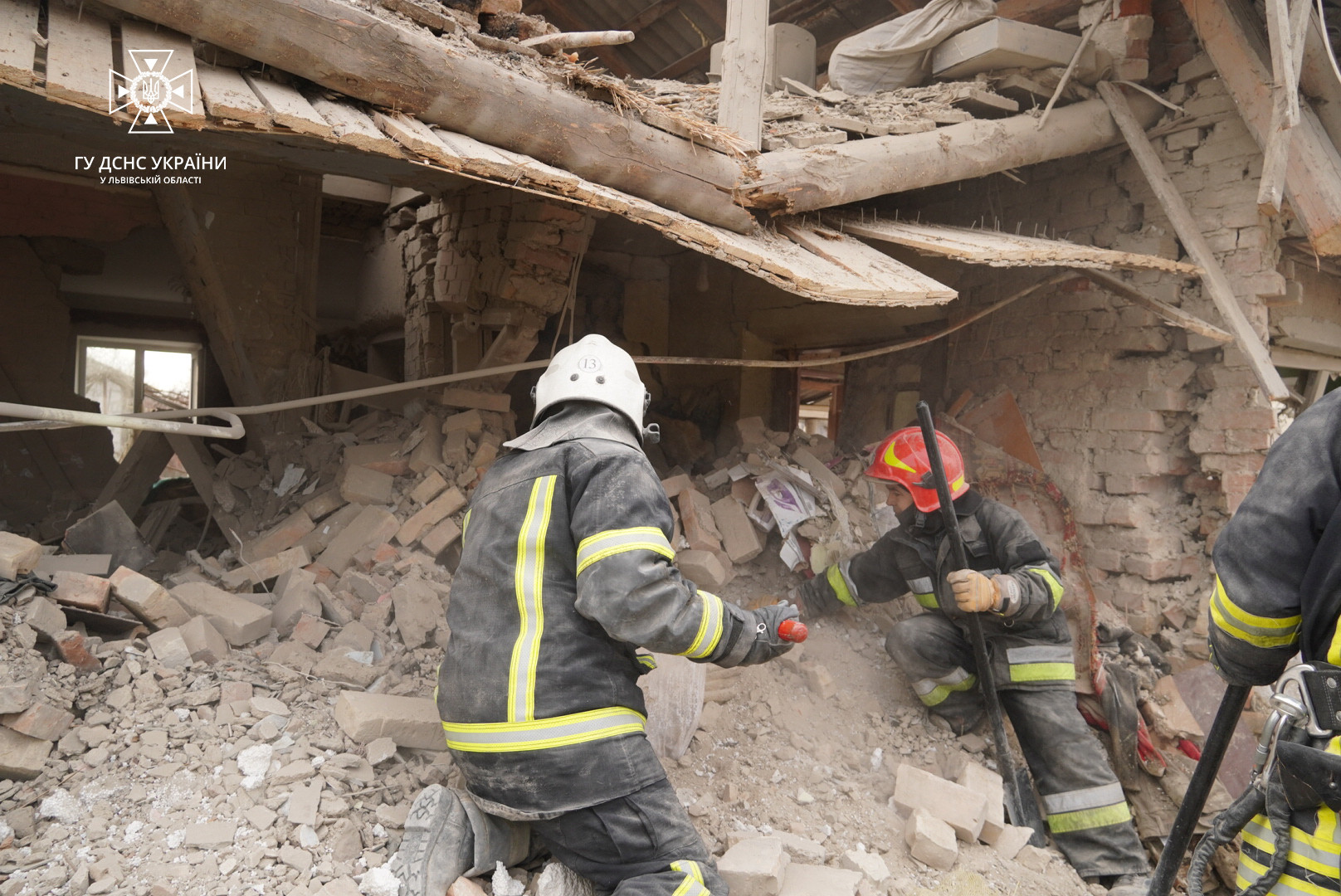
9 March 2023: a very tragic day for the residents of Velyka Vilshanytsia.

The village was first mentioned in writing in the late 14th century.

On 19 July 2020, as a result of the administrative-territorial reform and liquidation of the Zolochiv Raion, the village became part of the Zolochiv Raion.

On 9 March 2023, five people were killed in the village as a result of a Russian missile. Three houses and several other smaller buildings were destroyed by the resulting fires.

== Religion ==
=== Holy Trinity Church ===
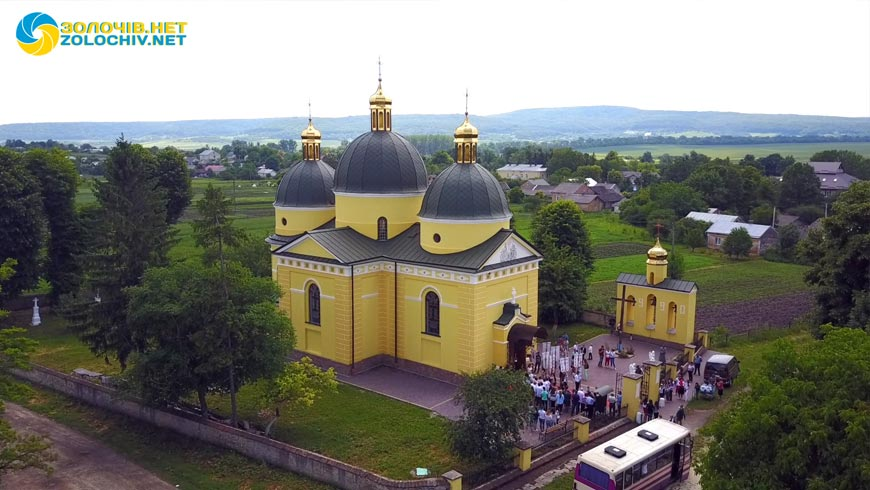
Holy Trinity Church

The construction of a new brick church in Velyka Vilshanytsia began in 1874 under the direction of Father Karol Levytskyi with the financial support of the grafinya Zuzanna Ożarowska, who owned the village. The architect Sylvestr Havryshkevych designed the church in the shape of a cross.

On 16 October (Julian calendar: 4 October) 1881, the new church was consecrated by the metropolitan archbishop Joseph Sembratovych.

In 1883 and 1884, Teofil Kopystynskyi, a famous artist of that era, painted sixteen icons for the church.

The church has been named in honor of the Holy Trinity since 1924.

== Notable residents ==
- Viktor Kurmanovych (1876–1945), Ukrainian politician and military leader
- Volodymyra Zhukovetska (1871–1940), Ukrainian Galician Kolomyia children's writer
- Antoni Schneider (1825–1880), Galician amateur archaeologist and local historian
- Lev Volovets (1936–2023), Ukrainian poet

== Bibliography ==
- "Olszanica 4.) O., wś". Geographical Dictionary of the Kingdom of Poland (in Polish). 7. Warszawa: Kasa im. Józefa Mianowskiego. 1886. p. 499—500.
