= Mikuláš Mušinka =

Slovak folklorist and Ukrainianist (1936–2024)

- Микола Іванович Мушинка
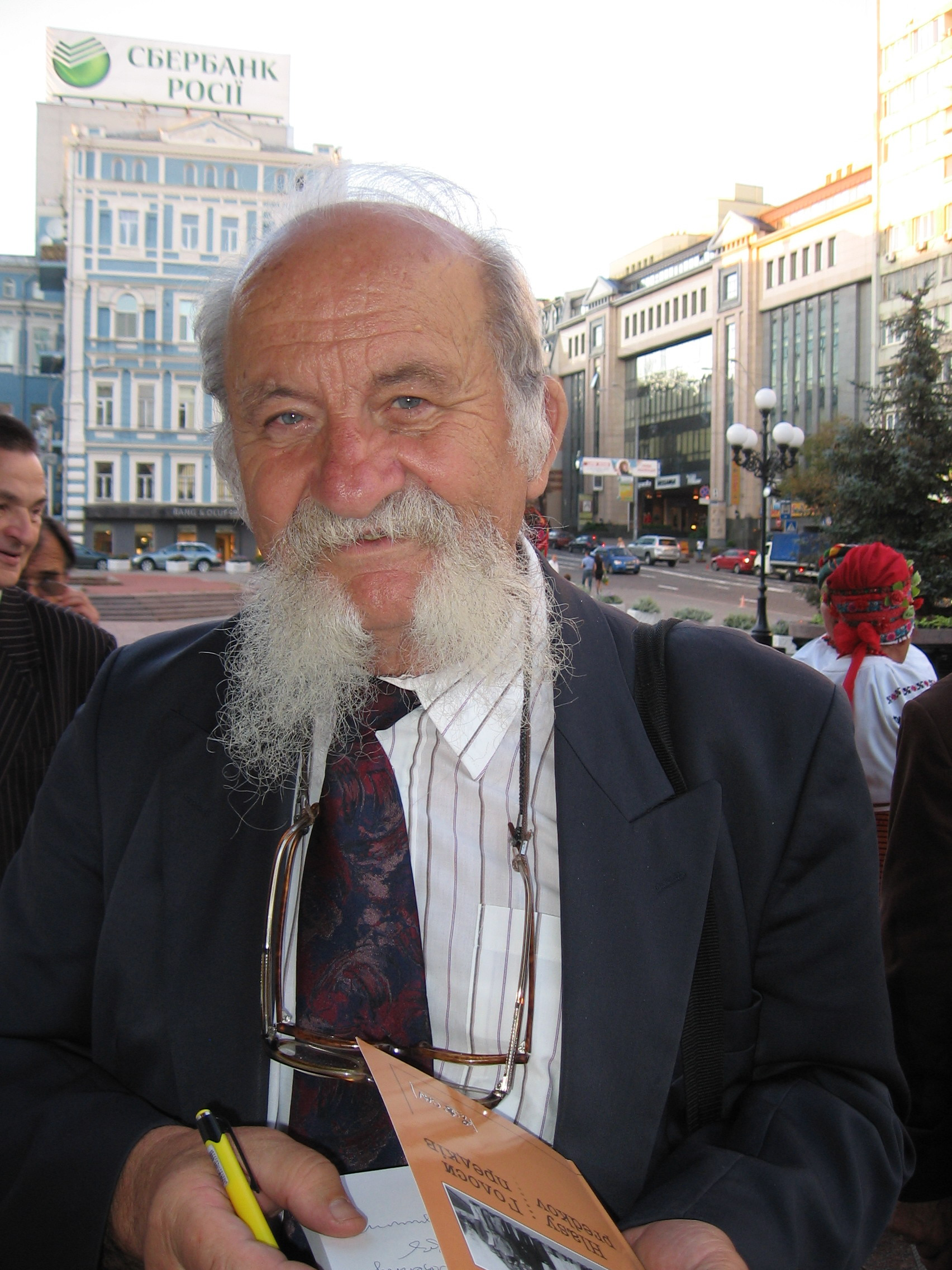
- Mikuláš Mušinka at the V World Forum of Ukrainians in Kyiv, 2011
- Born: 20 February 1936; Kurov, Czechoslovakia
- Died: 13 September 2024 (aged 88); Prešov, Slovakia
- Other names: Mykola Viruk, Mykola Hnatiukivskyi, Mykola Pastushenko, Petro Ihorchuk
- Education: Charles University
- Occupations: Folklorist and Ukrainian studies specialist, art historian, literary critic and bibliographer

Mikuláš Mušinka (Ukrainian: Микола Іванович Мушинка, romanized: Mykola Mushynka; 20 February 1936 – 13 September 2024) was a Slovak folklorist and Ukrainian studies specialist, art historian, literary critic and bibliographer of Ukrainian (Lemko) origin. He held a Candidate of Philological Sciences degree (from 1967) and a Doctor of Philological Sciences degree (1992). Member of the International Commission for the Study of the National Culture of the Carpathians and the Balkans, a full member of the Shevchenko Scientific Society (from 1989), President of the Shevchenko Scientific Society in Slovakia, head of the Association of Ukrainians in Slovakia (from 1990), and a foreign member of the National Academy of Sciences of Ukraine (from 1997).

== Works ==
He researched Lemko folklore in Yugoslavia, Romania, Poland, Ukraine, western Czechia, and Moravia, as well as Ukrainian-Slovak literary ties.

He authored around 200 scientific studies, over 1,000 articles, 350 reviews, and 50 books. More than 70 of these works are dedicated to Volodymyr Hnatiuk.

Selected works:

- Z ukrainskoho folkloru skhidnoi Slovachchyny (1963)
- Ukrainska usna slovesnist (1973)
- Folklor rusyniv Voivodyny (1976, 1987)

== Bibliography ==
- Mushynka Mykola Ivanovych / O. V. Myshanych, I. D. Krasovskyi, O. M. Mushynka // Encyclopedia of Modern Ukraine [Online] / Eds. : I. М. Dziuba, A. I. Zhukovsky, M. H. Zhelezniak [et al.] ; National Academy of Sciences of Ukraine, Shevchenko Scientific Society. – Kyiv : The NASU institute of Encyclopedic Research, 2020, upd. 2024.
- Віднянський С. В. Мушинка Микола // Енциклопедія історії України : у 10 т. / редкол.: В. А. Смолій (голова) та ін. ; Інститут історії України НАН України. — К. : Наукова думка, 2010. — Т. 7 : Мл — О. — С. 139-140. — ISBN 978-966-00-1061-1.
