= Antoni Schneider =

Polish writer on Galicia history (1825–1880)

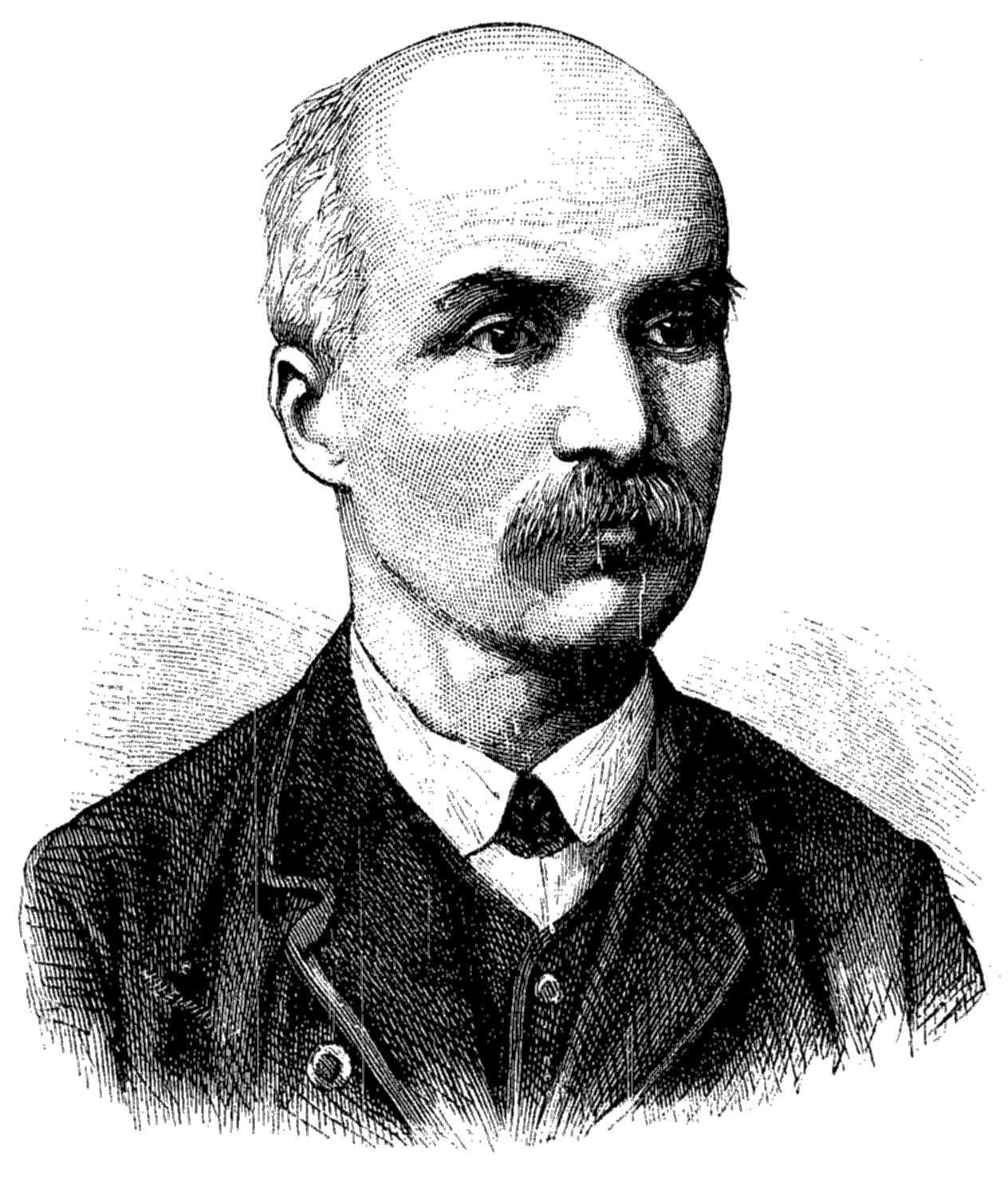
- Born: 12 June 1825; Velyka Vilshanytsia
- Died: 25 February 1880 (aged 54); Lviv
- Occupations: Sightseer, collector, encyclopedist and documenter

Antoni Schneider (12 June 1825 – 25 February 1880) was Polish sightseer, collector, encyclopedist and documenter of the history of Galicia.

== Biography ==
Schneider was the son of an Austrian non-commissioned officer and a Polish noblewoman, Teresa Wodnicka. He continued his education at the Lviv gymnasium, but dropped out due to the family's financial problems. He was then a scribe at the military chancellery, a roadmaster and an accountant. After moving to Lviv, he was employed as a clerk in the administration of the Dziennik Literacki. In 1848 he joined the Hungarian insurgent army, and after the fall of the Hungarian uprising was arrested and imprisoned in the Kufstein fortress. He shared a cell with the Hungarian historian Józef Teleki. Returning to Lviv on foot in 1851, he visited old ruins of castles, mansions and other monuments and collected old documents. Self-taught in order to expertly collect, he learned Latin and paleography, among other things.

In 1864, he published his first articles, presenting the history of "Galician cities and towns" in the pages of the Lviv-based Dziennik Literacki. His rapidly growing collection and publications in the press were noticed by historians Karol Estreicher, Antoni Małecki and Ossolineum curator Jerzy Prince Lubomirski. Thanks to them, he was given a free apartment at the Ossolineum where he could continue further work. In 1868, he began the publication of the Encyklopedia do krajoznawstwa Galicji. In 1876, after further publishing failures, he agreed to donate his collection to the newly established Academy of Learning in Kraków. Today the collection, known as Teki Schneidera, is kept at the National Archives in Krakow. After transferring the entire collection to Krakow in 1877, in the following years he began collecting source materials for the history of Galicia and Bukovina again. This new series of 282 portfolios (95,000 sheets) remained at the Lviv Ossolineum, and is now stored at the Manuscripts Branch of the Stefanyk Scientific Library of the National Academy of Sciences of Ukraine in Lviv.

Antoni Schneider committed suicide on 25 February 1880 in Lviv.

Teki Schneidera are still a subject of research. They are a valuable source for Galician heraldry and sphragistics, as well as toponymic research.

== Works ==
- Encyklopedja do krajoznawstwa Galicji, t. 1, Lwów 1868.
- Przewodnik po mieście Lwowie, Lwów 1871.
- Przewodnik po Lwowie, Lwów 1875.

== Bibliography ==
- Булик Н. Антоні Шнайдер: штрихи до наукового портрету львівського археолога. Матеріали і дослідження з археології Прикарпаття і Волині. — Львів : Інститут українознавства ім. І. Крип'якевича НАН України, 2010. — Т. 14. — s. 440–453.
- Ісаєвич Я. Шнайдер Антон // Енциклопедія історії України : у 10 т. / редкол.: В. А. Смолій (голова) та ін. ; Інститут історії України НАН України. — К. : Наукова думка, 2013. — Т. 10 : Т — Я. — С. 650. — ISBN 978-966-00-1359-9.
- Wiesław Bieńkowski, Dzieło Antoniego Schneidera i jego wartość dla badań nad historią książki, „Roczniki Biblioteczne”, R. XXXI, 1987.
- Katarzyna Ceklarz, Górale Babiogórscy w pismach i dokumentach Antoniego Schneidera, [w:] Górale Babiogórscy w badaniach XIX-wiecznych naukowców i podróżników, red. K. Słabosz-Palacz, Kraków-Zawoja 2018, s. 117–132.
- Łucja Charewiczowa, Historiografia i miłośnictwo Lwowa, Lwów 1938.
- Leszek Puchała, Kolekcja Antoniego Schneidra w zbiorach Lwowskiej Biblioteki Naukowej im. W. Stefanyka, [w:] Materiały do dziejów Podkarpacia we Lwowie i "ucrainica" na Podkarpaciu, Sanok 2006, s. 11–14.
