= Taras Voznyak =

Ukrainian culturologist and political scientist

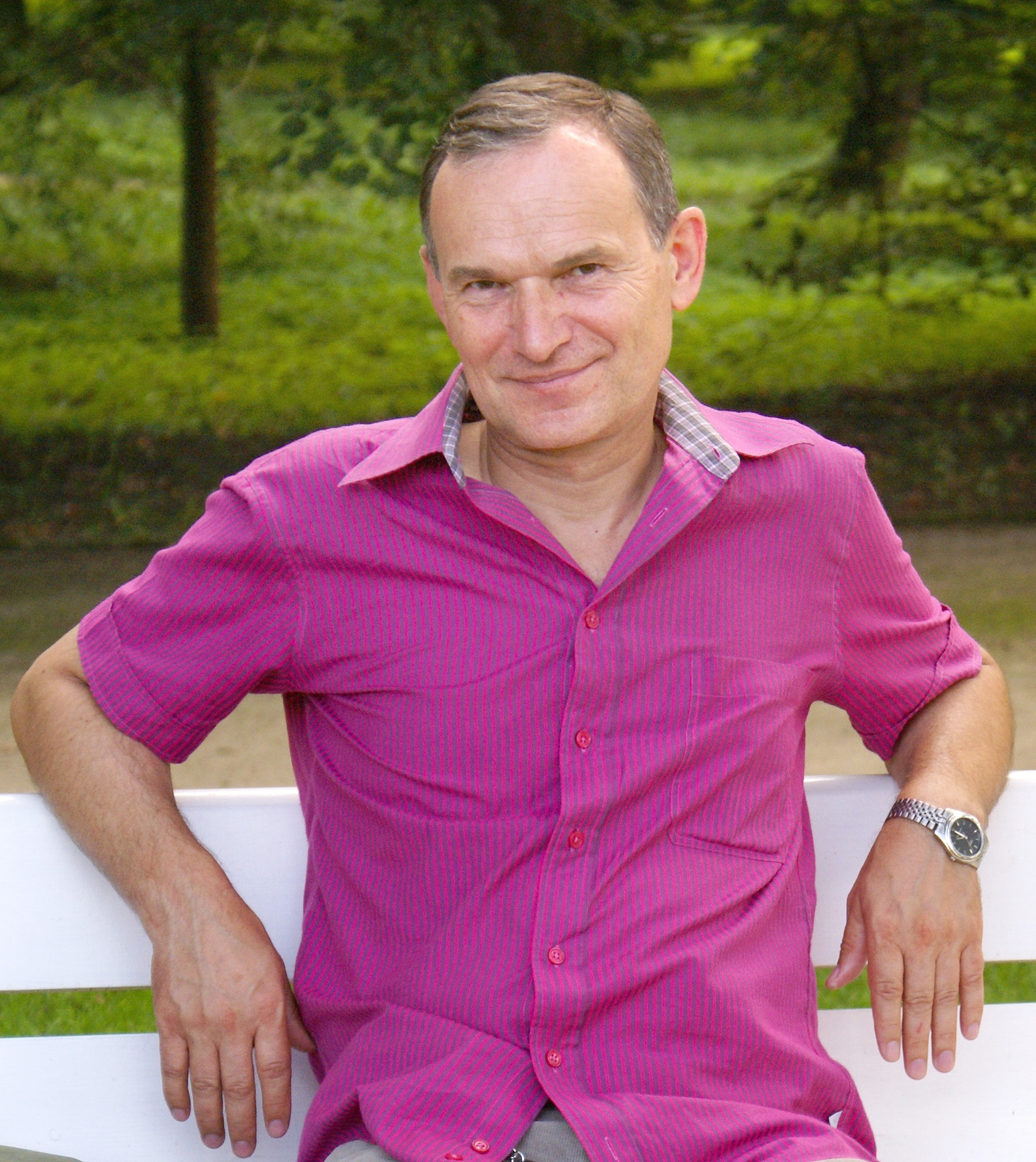

Personal details
- Born: May 11, 1957 (age 69) Svarychiv, Ukrainian SSR
- Education: Lviv Polytechnic National University

Taras Voznyak (Ukrainian: Тарас Возняк, born 11 May 1957) is a Ukrainian culturologist, political scientist, editor-in-chief and founder of Independent Cultural Journal "Ї", director of the Lviv National Art Gallery, laureate of the Vasyl Stus Prize (2021).

== Biography ==
Taras Voznyak was born after his father returned from exile in Magadan (exile lasted from 1945 to 1956). The family settled in the town of Broshniv-Osada. 1974–1979 – Taras Voznyak studies at Lviv Polytechnic Institute (currently Lviv Polytechnic National University) Taras Voznyak was close to an informal group of intellectuals united under the name "Lvivska Shkola" (Lviv School). Ihor Klekh, Hryhoriy Komskyi, Mykola Yakovyna and others were part of this group, which was operating in Lviv in the 1980s. He organised the printing of samizdat culturology literature. He translated a large number of texts and also published within samizdat, in particularly the books of Polish-Jewish writer Bruno Schulz.

=== Editor – Independent Cultural Journal "Ї" ===
In 1987 Taras Voznyak together with Mykola Yakovyna initiated the creation of the Independent Cultural Journal. The name of the Journal – "Ї" – was thought up by Ukrainian translator Hryhoriy Kochur and linguist Yuriy Shevelyov during the meeting in Lviv.

The first issue of the Independent Cultural Journal "Ї" was published in 1989. Since then Taras Voznyak remains the Journal's editor-in-chief and publisher. With the support from Reform Movement of Lithuania "Sajudis", the first five Journal issues were manufactured as photocopies in Vilnius. The photocopies would be brought to Lviv, and then they were stitched and distributed nationally in Ukraine. This is when Oleksandr Kryvenko, the editor of samvydav Lviv newspaper "Postup", joined the Journal team. In 1995 the Journal was officially registered – Taras Voznyak, Mykhaylo Moskal and Oleksandr Pohranychnyi became the Journal founders.

Independent Cultural Journal "Ї" is published in paper and electronic form. The Journal has long ago transformed into an influential NGO and a think tank. The main issues, which the NGO Independent Cultural Journal "Ї" is working upon, are the issues of civil society, human rights, interethnic relations, cross-border cooperation, multiculturalism, European integration, regionalism, globalisation and anti-globalist movements, ecumenical dialogue, political changes in the region.

As a leader of NGO Independent Cultural Journal "Ї" Taras Voznyak organises and holds numerous international, national and local conferences, meetings, round table discussion, and other events. He is the initiator and organiser of community campaigns on the promotion of cultural heritage of Halychyna – in particular the sculptor of 18th century Johann-Georg Pinzel, writer and painter Bruno Schulz, writer Zygmunt Haupt.

Journal "Ї" has become a cult publication in Lviv. Journal's series have been reconstructing local identities of Halychyna, Volyn, Zakarpattya, Bukovina for many years. Several Journal issues have been promoting the almost non-existent Polish, Jewish and Armenian cultural landscapes of the region – Polish, Jewish and Armenian "uni-verse" of Halychyna. A range of Journal issues is dedicated to phenomena of the cities – Lviv, Chernivtsi, Ivano-Frankivsk, Ternopil, Kolomyja, Zhovkva.

In 2001, an honorary distinction "Order for Intellectual Bravery" was established (initiated by Taras Voznyak and Oleksandr Pohranychnyi), which since then has been accepted by Borys Tarasyuk, Nataliya Yakovenko, Myroslav Popovych, Emma Andijevska, Roman Viktyuk, Vyacheslav Bryukhovetskyi, Valentyn Sylvestrov, Myroslav Marynovych, Hryhoriy Hrabovych, Andrzej Nikodemowicz, Borys Gudzyak, Pavlo Chuchka, Yevhen Zakharov, Roman Petruk, Bohdan Osadchuk, Leonid Finberg, Mustafa Jemilev, Anatoliy Hrytsenko, Ihor Isichenko, Oksana Pakhlyovska, Andriy Sodomora, Igor Shevchenko, Yaroslav Grytsak, Aleksandra Hnatyuk, Moses Fishbein, Bohdan Soroka, Bohdan Havrylyshyn, Mykola Kniazhyckyi, Karmela Cepkolenko, Kostiantyn Sigov, Ruslana Lazhychko, Vladyslav Troickyi, Bogumila Berdychovska, Tiberij Silvashi, Iza Chruslinska, Taras Prochasko, Oksana Lyniv, Yevhen Bystryckyi, Paweł Piotr Smoleński, Yosyf Zisels, Patriarch Filaret, Stanisław Rosiek, Tamara Hundorova, Oleksander Roitburd, Roman Kis, Orest Drul, Taras Kompanichenko, Yuriy Shcherbak, Petro Rykhlo, Andrey Piontkovsky, Vlada Ralko, Volodymyr Budnikov, Timothy Snyder, Alvydas Nikžentaitis, Andrzej Betlej, Oleh Khoma, Roman Szporliuk, Yuriy Andruchvych, Vydas Dolinskas, Grzegorz Gauden, Basil Kerski, Olena Stiazhkina.

=== Public life and opinion journalism ===
During the 1990s Taras Voznyak has started to actively publish his culturology essays in Ukraine as well as abroad. He is the author of more than 400 publications in Ukrainian and foreign media; he also writes for the following magazines: "Ї", "Suchasnist" (Contemporary Times), "Kyiv", "Philosophical and Sociological Thought", "Krytyka" (Criticism), "Geneza" (Genesis), "Universum" (Universe), "Glavred" (Chief Editor); newspapers: "Den" (Day), "Dzerkalo Tyzhnya" (Mirror Weekly), "Gazeta Po-Ukrainsky", "Ukraina Moloda" (Young Ukraine), "Ukrainskyi Tyzhden" (Ukrainian Week), blogs: Ukrainska pravda, "Zbruc".

From the time Ukraine won its independence, Taras Voznyak has continuously been involved in establishing cross-border cooperation and maintaining international relations, while holding various official posts.

Taras Voznyak was awarded with an honorary distinction "Knight of Halychyna" in the nomination "Public Figure" (2001), a distinction "20 Years of the First Democratic Convocation of Lviv Regional Council" (2010), a distinction by Lviv Mayor "Saint George Distinction of Honour" (2011), Cross of Merit (Poland, 2014), a distinction of Polish-Ukrainian Ignacy Jan Paderewski Foundation (2014), Honorary award "100th anniversary of the proclamation of the Western Ukrainian People's Republic" (2018), laureate of the Vasyl Stus Prize (2021), awarded by honorary award of the Chernivtsi regional state administration "To the glory of Bukovyna" (2021), awarded by the Order of Ministry of Culture of the Republic of Lithuania "Wear Yours and Believe" (Apdovanojimas "Nešk savo svoją ir tikėk") (2023), laureate of the Polish-Lithuanian Jerzy Giedroyc Award (2023), Officer's Order "For Merit to Lithuania" (Ordinas «Už nuopelnus Lietuvai») (2024), with the distinction of "Knight of Culture" ("Kultūros Riterius" Trakų ististorio muziejus) (Lithuania, 2024), Order of Arts of the Ukrainian National Academy of Arts (2025).

- 1989–present – Head of the Board of Directors of NGO International Centre for Cultural Initiatives, Lviv
- 1996–1999 – Head of the Publishing Council of International Renaissance Foundation, Kyiv
- 1998–present – Member (Pastpresident 2015–2016) of "Lviv-Leopolis" Rotary Club, Lviv
- 2002–2004 – Head of the Steering Council of the "East-East Programme: Partnership Beyond Borders" of International Renaissance Foundation, Kyiv
- 2000–2004 – Committee Member of Taras Shevchenko National Award of Ukraine, Kyiv
- 2005–present – Co-founder and Head of the Board of Directors of Polish-Ukrainian Cooperation Foundation (PAUCI), Warsaw-Kyiv
- 2009–present – Member of the Board of Directors of International Renaissance Foundation, Kyiv
- 2012 – Member and Executive Director (2013-2017) of the Ukrainian Center of International PEN-Club, Kyiv
- 2014 – Candidate for Ukrainian Parliament in the 122nd electoral district
- 2010–present – Member of the International Council on Monuments and Sites – ICOMOS, Kyiv-Lviv
- 2016–present – Director of the Lviv National Art Gallery
- 2017–2019 – Member of the Ukrainian-Polish Forum (Ministries of Internal Affairs of Ukraine and Poland)
- 2018–present — Chancellor of the International Gutenberg Society in Ukraine (Internationale Gutenberg-Gesellschaft)

== Published works ==
- Voznyak Т. Texts and Translations, Kharkiv, "Folio", 1998, 667 p.
- Voznyak Т. Philosophy of Language, Lviv, "Ї", 2009, 180 p.
- Voznyak Т. Phenomenon of the City, Lviv, "Ї", 2009, 290 p.
- Voznyak Т. Philosophical Essays, Lviv, "Ї", 2009, 300 p.
- Voznyak Т. Retrospective Political Science. Kuchma's Era: "Ї", 2010, 180 p.
- Voznyak Т. Retrospective Political Science. Yushchenko's Era. Long Prelude, Lviv: "Ї", 2010, 264 p.
- Voznyak Т. Retrospective Political Science. Yushchenko's Era. Lost Expectations, Lviv: "Ї", 2010, 202 p.
- Voznyak Т. Retrospective Political Science. Yanukovych's Era – I, Lviv: "Ї", 2010, 122 p.
- Voznyak Т. Galician Stetles, Lviv: "Ї", 2010, 444 c.
- Voznyak Т. Tα μετα τα φυσικά of Carpathians. Selected Epiphanies, Lviv: "Ї", 2011, 200 p.
- Voznyak Т. Bruno Schulz. The Return, Lviv: "Ї", 2012, 218 p.
- Voznyak Т. Retrospective Political Science. Yanukovych's Era – II. Then came Freedom – VO Svoboda, Lviv: «Ї», 2013, 544 p.
- Voznyak Т. Retrospective Political Science. Yanukovych's Era – III, Agony of Regime, Lviv: «Ї», 2010, 456 p.
- Voznyak Т. Фαινόμενο of the Place, Lviv: «Ї», Selected Epiphanies, 2014, 106 p.
- Voznyak Т. Geopolitical Contexts of the War in Ukraine, Lviv: «Ї», 2015, 220 p.
- Voznyak Т. Philosophical Essays, Kyiv, Duch i Litera, 2016, 590 p.
- Voznyak Т. Language and Place, Kyiv, Duch i Litera, 2017, 467 p.
- Voznyak Т. Retrospective Political Science. Poroshenko Era. War, Lviv: «Ї», 2017, 300 p.
- Voznyak Т. Retrospective Political Science. Poroshenko Era. System Resistance, Lviv: «Ї», 2017, 475 p.
- Voznyak Т. Bruno Schulz. The Return, Kyiv, Duch i Litera, 2017, 196 p.
- Voznyak Т. Judaica Galiciensia, Kyiv, Duch i Litera, 2017, 546 p.
- Voznyak Т. Cultural Essays, Kyiv, Duch i Litera, 2018, 252 p.
- Voznyak Т. Political Essays, Kyiv, Duch i Litera, 2018, 498 p.
- Voznyak Т. A Small Galician Encyclopedia: a Joke and Seriously, Lviv, Rastr 7, 2020, 368 p.
- Voznyak Т. Art Essays I, Kyiv, Duch i Litera, 2020, 258 p.
- Voznyak Т. Art Essays II, Kyiv, Duch i Litera, 2022, 256 p.
- Voznyak Т. Speeches on the Boundary of the Year, Lviv: «Ї», 2022, 116 p.
- Voznyak Т. Art Essays III, Lviv: «Ї», 2024, 216 p.
- Voznyak Т. Art Essays IV, Lviv: «Ї», 2025, 192 p.
- Voznyak T. Art Essays V, Lviv: «Ї». 2026, 248 p.
- Voznyak T. Art Essays VII, Lviv: «Ї». 2026, 185 p.

== Additional sources of information ==
- Алла Татаренко. Српска књижевност као огледало балканске драме — Белград, Борба — 31 березня 2000 року
- Ukraina: brak pomysłu na państwo — Краків, Tygodnik Powszechny — No.26 (2712), 30 червня 2001 року
- Уляна Івашків. Ушанування інтелектуально відважних — Львів, Поступ — 24 грудня 2002 року
- Ігор Мельник. Діалог між народами — Львів, Поступ — 14 травня 2004
- Яна Кутько. Про що говорить тринадцята літера алфавіту? — Київ, День — No.182, 9 жовтня 2004 року
- Михаил Гольд. Евреи в Галиции. Оконченный роман? — Ежемесячный литературно-публицистический журнал и издательство Лехаим — лютий 2009 року
- Валерий Сердюченко. Клубы львовских интеллектуалов — Нью-Йорк, Лебедь — No. 299, 24 листопада 2002 року
- Ірина Сиривко. Тарас Возняк: Нагорода стимулює працювати краще — Львів, Поступ — 22 січня 2004 року
- Володимир Цибулько. Філософ західної брами раю — Київ, Україна молода — No.82, 11 травня 2007 року
