= Rozhniativ =

Rural locality in Ivano-Frankivsk Oblast, Ukraine

Rozhniativ Рожнятів Rožniatiw
- Rural settlement
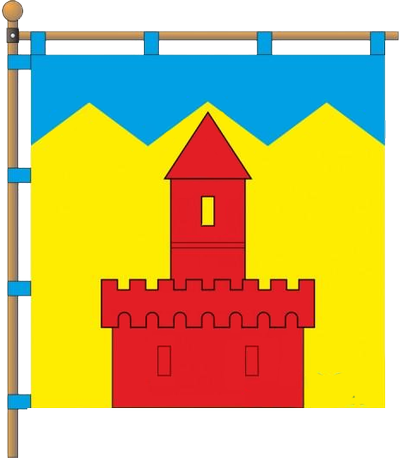
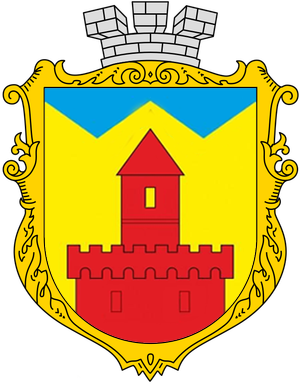
- Flag Coat of arms
- Interactive map of Rozhniativ
- Location of Rozhniativ, Ukraine Rozhniativ (Ukraine)
- Coordinates: 48°56′11″N 24°09′17″E
- Country: Ukraine
- Oblast: Ivano-Frankivsk
- Raion: Kalush Raion
- Established: 11th century (Stare Selo)

Area
  - Total: 19.23 km^{2} (7.42 sq mi)
- Elevation: 367 m (1,204 ft)

Population (2023)
  - Total: 3,873
  - Density: 208.16/km^{2} (539.1/sq mi)
- Area code: +380 3474
- Website: селище Рожнятів ^{(Ukrainian)}

Rozhniativ (Ukrainian: Рожня́тів; Polish: Rożniatów), formerly Rozhnitiv (Ukrainian: Рожні́тів), is a rural settlement in Kalush Raion, Ivano-Frankivsk Oblast, Ukraine. It hosts the administration of Rozhniativ settlement hromada, one of the hromadas of Ukraine. The population is 3,873 (2022 estimate).

== History ==
Until 18 July 2020, Rozhniativ was the administrative center of Rozhniativ Raion. The raion was abolished in July 2020 as part of the administrative reform of Ukraine, which reduced the number of raions of Ivano-Frankivsk Oblast to six. The area of Rozhniativ Raion was merged into Kalush Raion.

Until 26 January 2024, Rozhniativ was designated urban-type settlement. On this day, a new law entered into force which abolished this status, and Rozhniativ became a rural settlement.

== Notable residents ==
- Bohdan Pylypiv (born 1954), Ukrainian pyrography artist

== Location ==
Local orientation

Regional orientation
