= Bohdan Danylyshyn =

Bohdan Mykhaylovych Danylyshyn
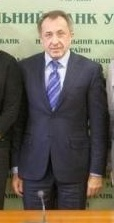
- Danylyshyn in 2016

5th Chairman of the Council of the National Bank of Ukraine
- In office October 25, 2016 – November 14, 2022
- President: Petro Poroshenko; Volodymyr Zelenskyy
- Preceded by: Stanislav Bukovynskyi
- Succeeded by: Vacant

19th Minister of Economy of Ukraine
- In office December 18, 2007 – February 11, 2010
- President: Viktor Yushchenko
- Prime Minister: Yulia Tymoshenko
- Preceded by: Anatoliy Kinakh
- Succeeded by: Vasyl Tsushko

Personal details
- Born: June 6, 1965 (age 61) Tserkivna, Dolynskyi Raion, Ivano-Frankivsk Oblast, Ukrainian SSR
- Party: Independent
- Awards: Honored Science and Technology Figure of Ukraine; State Prize of Ukraine in Science and Technology; Honorary Diploma of the Cabinet of Ministers of Ukraine; Honorary Diploma of the Verkhovna Rada of Ukraine

Bohdan Mykhaylovych Danylyshyn (Ukrainian: Богдан Михайлович Данилишин; born June 6, 1965, in Tserkivna, Dolynskyi Raion, Ivano-Frankivsk Oblast, Ukrainian SSR) is a Ukrainian statesman, politician, economist, Doctor of Economic Sciences, Professor, and Academician of the National Academy of Sciences of Ukraine. He was the Minister of Economy of Ukraine in the second government of Yulia Tymoshenko.

He served as Chairman of the Council of the National Bank of Ukraine from 2016 to November 2022, and as a member until October 2023.

== Biography ==
Bohdan Danylyshyn was born on June 6, 1965, in the village of Tserkivna, Ivano-Frankivsk Oblast. He graduated from the Faculty of Natural Sciences at Ternopil Volodymyr Hnatiuk National Pedagogical University, and completed postgraduate and doctoral studies at the Council for the Study of Productive Forces of the National Academy of Sciences of Ukraine in the specialties of “economics of natural resource use” and “regional economics, development of productive forces.” He is the author of over 150 scientific works, holds a Doctor of Economic Sciences degree (1997), professor (2003), and is an Academician of the National Academy of Sciences of Ukraine (2009). He has taught at Kyiv National University named after Taras Shevchenko, National University of the State Tax Service of Ukraine, National Academy for Public Administration under the President of Ukraine, Charles University (Prague), and Humboldt University (Berlin).

From 2003 to 2010, he served as the head of the expert council of the Higher Attestation Commission of Ukraine on issues of macroeconomics, transformations, international and regional development. He was awarded a Gratitude from the Head of the Higher Attestation Commission of Ukraine.

From 2007 to 2010, he held the position of Minister of Economy of Ukraine in the second government of Yulia Tymoshenko.

In 2008, he became a co-founder and the first Chairman of the Ukrainian-American Council on Trade and Investment. He was awarded a personal Gratitude from U.S. President George Bush. On October 2, 2008, he was elected Chairman of the Council of Exporters of Ukraine.

From 2014, he has been a professor at Kyiv National Economic University named after Vadym Hetman, and from October 2016 to November 2022, he served as Chairman of the Council of the National Bank of Ukraine. He remained a member of the Council until October 2023.

He is the former head of the Council for the Study of Productive Forces of the National Academy of Sciences of Ukraine. He is a full member of the Shevchenko Scientific Society (France).

He has been a member of the Bureau of the Department of Economics of the National Academy of Sciences of Ukraine since 2004.

== Scandals and criminal cases ==
=== Criminal case of 2010 and political asylum in the Czech Republic ===
In August 2010, the Prosecutor General’s Office of Ukraine initiated a criminal case against Bohdan Danylyshyn, accusing him of causing damages to the state amounting to approximately 4.5 million hryvnias. According to the investigation, the damages were inflicted as a result of Danylyshyn approving a single-source procurement procedure for the State Enterprise “Boryspil International Airport” during his tenure as Minister of Economy. Following the initiation of the case, Danylyshyn was placed on the international wanted list and detained in the Czech Republic in October 2010.

In November 2010, Danylyshyn applied for political asylum in the Czech Republic, claiming that the criminal prosecution was politically motivated. On January 13, 2011, the Czech Ministry of Interior granted his request, making him the first Ukrainian citizen to receive political asylum in a European Union country. On January 14, 2011, the Prague Municipal Court released him from custody.

On March 1, 2013, the Ministry of Internal Affairs of Ukraine reported that on December 12, 2012, the Prosecutor General’s Office had terminated the criminal proceedings against Danylyshyn due to the absence of a criminal offense. Following this, he was removed from the international wanted list and returned to Ukraine in 2014. Critics, including opposition politicians and journalists, argued that the case may have been politically motivated and linked to his work in the Tymoshenko government.

=== Ties to Ihor Kolomoyskyi ===
Bohdan Danylyshyn’s tenure as Chairman of the Council of the National Bank of Ukraine (2016–2023) was accompanied by speculations in the media and among economic commentators regarding his possible political and informal proximity to oligarch Ihor Kolomoyskyi — one of the main opponents of the National Bank of Ukraine following the nationalization of PrivatBank.

The basis for such speculations included: regular public criticism of the NBU Board’s actions by Danylyshyn, particularly regarding the discount rate policy and regulatory approach to banks associated with former shareholders of PrivatBank; confrontation with the then NBU Chairman Yakiv Smolii and First Deputy Kateryna Rozhkova, who were accused of “lobbying Western interests” and “ignoring the position of the NBU Council”; expressions of positions similar to the rhetoric of Kolomoyskyi’s lawyers in court cases regarding PrivatBank.

Despite this, Danylyshyn himself has repeatedly denied any ties to Ihor Kolomoyskyi. In public interviews, he emphasized his independence as an analyst and the need for pluralism in monetary discussions.

At the same time, a number of independent experts, including former NBU Board member Serhiy Nikolaychuk, pointed to the potential influence of political actors on the work of the NBU Council in the period after 2019, without naming Danylyshyn directly, but implying the threat of “oligarchic counter-reaction” following the cleansing of the banking sector.

=== Conflicts with the NBU Board in the Interests of Kolomoyskyi ===
During his tenure as Chairman of the Council of the National Bank of Ukraine (2016–2023), Bohdan Danylyshyn repeatedly engaged in public conflicts with the NBU Board, including with Board Chairman Yakiv Smolii and his First Deputy Kateryna Rozhkova. These conflicts were accompanied by mutual accusations, as well as allegations of political bias and undermining the independence of the regulator.

In December 2019, Yakiv Smolii stated that the NBU Council, chaired by Danylyshyn, was exerting systematic pressure on the Board, including through public destabilization of monetary policy, accusations of “detachment from the real sector,” and “ignoring the economic interests of citizens.”

In response, Danylyshyn stated that the NBU Board “ignores the Council’s position” and “distances itself from macroeconomic dialogue with the real sector.” He also publicly hinted at possible corruption risks in the Board’s actions, mentioning one of its members — Viktor Kozyuk, who, according to Danylyshyn, was allegedly linked to state support for private structures.

During one of his public appearances in 2020, Danylyshyn also accused the Board of conducting a “monetary experiment” with a high discount rate, which, in his opinion, led to a slowdown in lending and industrial decline. In response, Rozhkova stated that such rhetoric “discredits the institution” and “plays into the hands of populists.”

In June 2020, following Yakiv Smolii’s resignation, which was accompanied by statements about “systemic political pressure,” economists, including former NBU heads, stated the threat to the regulator’s independence and named conflicts in the NBU Council as one of the destabilizing factors.

Critics of Danylyshyn pointed out that his position coincided with the theses promoted by opponents of “PrivatBank” and Ihor Kolomoyskyi in court proceedings.

== Criticism ==
=== Accusations of erroneous economic forecasts ===
As Minister of Economy, Danylyshyn was repeatedly criticized for his economic forecasts and decisions. In 2008–2009, he publicly denied the possibility of a second wave of economic crisis and predicted an economic upturn in the second half of the year, which did not materialize amid the global financial crisis. His statements about the stability of the hryvnia and the absence of prerequisites for devaluation also sparked controversy, as the hryvnia significantly depreciated during that period.

=== Criticism in the context of the “bankopad” of 2014–2017 ===
The “bankopad” of 2014–2017, during which the National Bank of Ukraine liquidated about 100 banks, became one of the most controversial chapters in the history of the Ukrainian banking system. Bohdan Danylyshyn, as Chairman of the NBU Council from 2016, found himself at the center of criticism for his role during this period. Although he was not directly responsible for the decisions on bank liquidations, his public statements and position on reforms sparked controversy.

Critics, including some politicians and representatives of the banking sector, argued that the “bankopad” was partially politically motivated and led to the destruction of a significant part of banks with Ukrainian capital. For example, Yulia Tymoshenko in 2018 stated that 90% of the liquidated banks met NBU requirements and accused the bank’s leadership of excessive rigidity. Danylyshyn, although he did not directly support such accusations, repeatedly emphasized the need to protect national banks and criticized the reforms for their negative impact on the economy. His position was perceived as indirect support for critics of the “bankopad”.
