= Tserkivna =

Rural locality in Ivano-Frankivsk Oblast, Ukraine

Tserkivna Церківна
- Interactive map of Tserkivna
- Location in Ivano-Frankivsk Oblast
- Coordinates: 49°0′9″N 23°47′10″E
- Country: Ukraine
- Oblast: Ivano-Frankivsk Oblast
- Raion: Kalush Raion
- Hromada: Vytvytsia rural hromada
- Time zone: UTC+2 (EET)
  - Summer (DST): UTC+3 (EEST)
- Postal code: 77532

Tserkivna (until 2025 Tserkovna; Ukrainian: Церківна) is a village in the Vytvytsia rural hromada of the Kalush Raion of Ivano-Frankivsk Oblast in Ukraine.

== History ==
On 19 July 2020, as a result of the administrative-territorial reform and liquidation of the Dolyna Raion, the village became part of the Kalush Raion.

Until 15 June 2025, it was called Tserkovna. The renaming was initiated by the villagers, given that historically its residents used the name Tserkivna.

== Religion ==
- St. Paraskeva church (1807, UGCC, wooden).

== Sources ==
- "Cerkowna, pow. Dolina". Geographical Dictionary of the Kingdom of Poland (in Polish). 1. Warszawa: Kasa im. Józefa Mianowskiego. 1880. p. 535.
