= Vytvytsia rural hromada =

Hromada in Ivano-Frankivsk Oblast, Ukraine

Vytvytsia rural hromada Витвицька сільська громада
- Hromada
- Interactive map of Vytvytsia rural hromada
- Country: Ukraine
- Oblast: Ivano-Frankivsk Oblast
- Raion: Kalush Raion
- Admin. center: Vytvytsia

Area
  - Total: 154.94 km^{2} (59.82 sq mi)

Population (2018)
  - Total: 5,935
  - Density: 38.31/km^{2} (99.21/sq mi)
- CATOTTG code: UA26080250000056546
- Settlements: 9
- Rural settlements: 1
- Villages: 8
- Website: vytvytska-gromada.gov.ua

Vytvytsia rural hromada (Ukrainian: Витвицька сільська громада) is a hromada in Ukraine, in Kalush Raion of Ivano-Frankivsk Oblast. The administrative center is the village of Vytvytsia.

Hromada was formed on 6 September 2016 as a merger of the Vytvytska, Kalnyanska, Roztochkivska, Slobidsko-Bolekhivska, and Stankovetska village councils of the former Dolynskyi district. There are 8 schools, 2 kindergartens, 5 urgent care facilities, and 3 outpatient clinics or polyclinics in the community.

== Settlements ==
The hromada consists of 1 rural settlement (Vyhodivka) and 9 villages:

- Vytvytsia
- Kalna
- Lypa
- Luzhky
- Roztochky
- Sloboda-Bolekhivska
- Stankivtsi
- Tserkovna
