= Stankivtsi, Ivano-Frankivsk Oblast =

Rural locality in Ivano-Frankivsk Oblast, Ukraine

Stankivtsi Станківці
- Interactive map of Stankivtsi
- Location in Ivano-Frankivsk Oblast
- Coordinates: 48°59′50″N 23°47′53″E
- Country: Ukraine
- Oblast: Ivano-Frankivsk Oblast
- Raion: Kalush Raion
- Hromada: Vytvytsia Hromada
- Time zone: UTC+2 (EET)
  - Summer (DST): UTC+3 (EEST)
- Postal code: 77531

Stankivtsi (Ukrainian: Станківці) is a village in Vytvytsia rural hromada, Kalush Raion, Ivano-Frankivsk Oblast, Ukraine.

== History ==
It was first mentioned in 1663.

== Religion ==
- Saint Michael church (1830, wooden; 2003, brick; UGCC)

== Sources ==
- "Stańkowce, 2.) pow. doliński". Geographical Dictionary of the Kingdom of Poland (in Polish). 10. Warszawa: Kasa im. Józefa Mianowskiego. 1889. p. 212.
