= Dolyna Raion =

Former subdivision of Ivano-Frankivsk Oblast, Ukraine

Dolyna Raion Долинський район
- Raion
- Dolynskyi raion
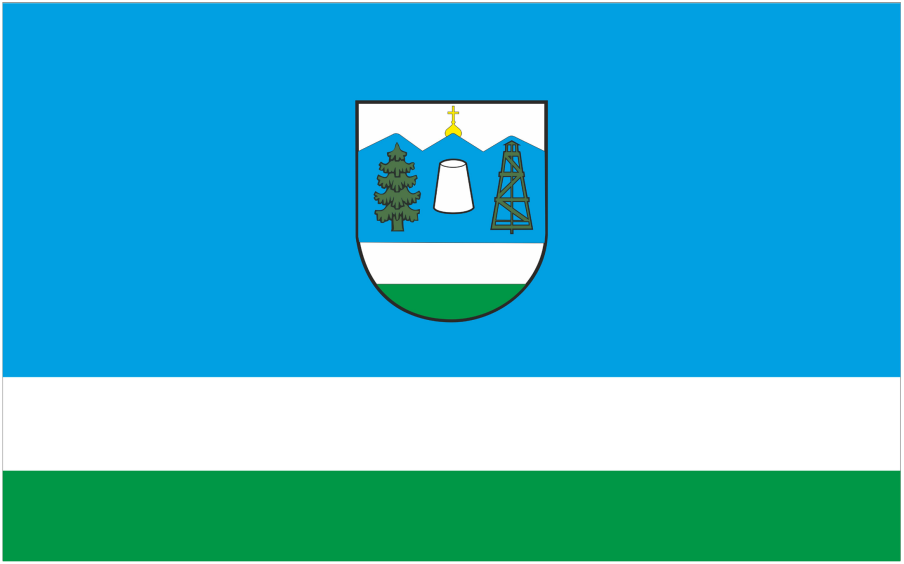
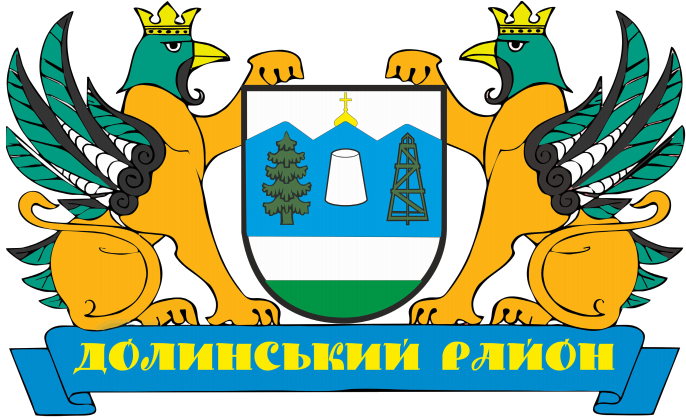
- Flag Coat of arms

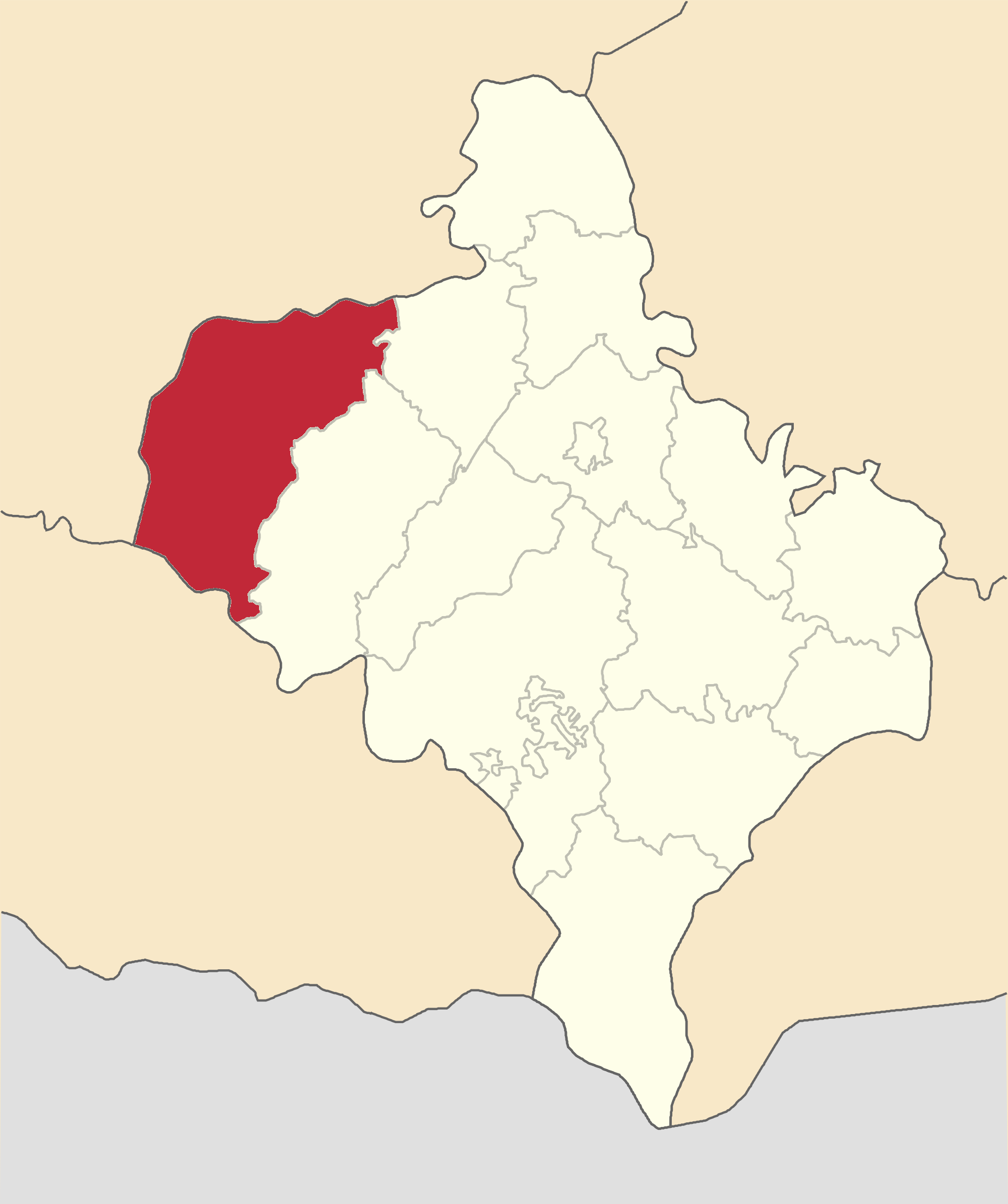
- Coordinates: 48°53′28″N 23°50′35″E
- Country: Ukraine
- Region: Ivano-Frankivsk Oblast
- Established: January 1, 1947 (1940, originally)
- Disestablished: 18 July 2020
- Admin. center: Dolyna
- Subdivisions: List: — city councils; — settlement councils; — rural councils; Number of localities: — cities; — urban-type settlements; 41 — villages; — rural settlements

Government
  - Governor: Oleksandr Krynytsky

Area
  - Total: 1,248 km^{2} (482 sq mi)

Population (2020)
  - Total: 68,266
  - Density: 54.70/km^{2} (141.7/sq mi)
- Time zone: UTC+2 (EET)
  - Summer (DST): UTC+3 (EEST)
- Postal index: 77500
- Area code: 380-3477

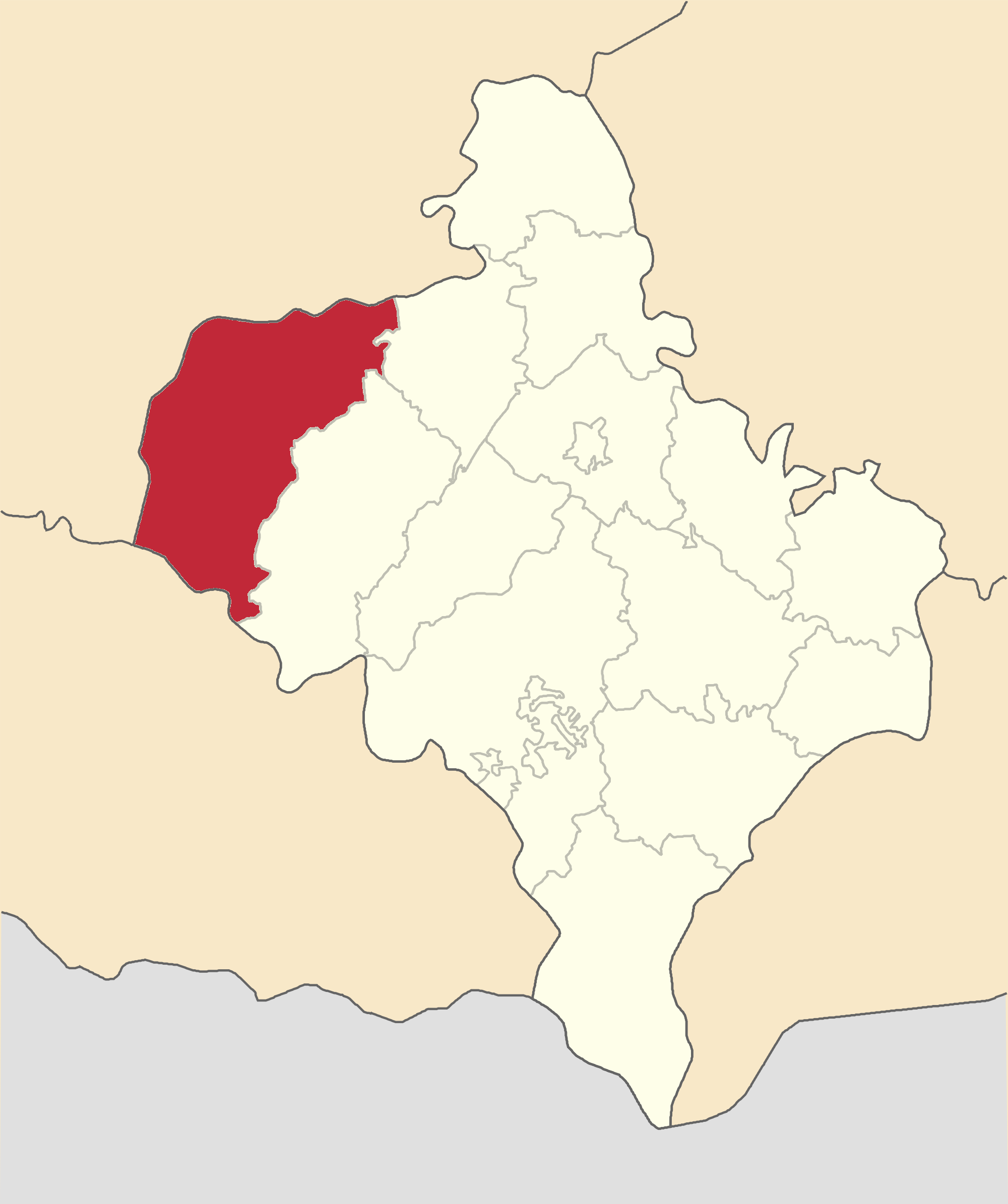
Dolyna Raion in Ivano-Frankivsk Oblast

Dolyna Raion (Ukrainian: Долинський райо́н, romanized: Dolyns'kyj rajon) was a raion (administrative district) of Ivano-Frankivsk Oblast of Ukraine. The city of Dolyna was the administrative center of the raion. The raion was abolished on 18 July 2020 as part of the administrative reform of Ukraine, which reduced the number of raions of Ivano-Frankivsk Oblast Oblast to six. The area of Dolyna Raion was merged into Kalush Raion. The last estimate of the raion population was 68,266 (2020 est.).

The raion was located in the historical land of Boyko people.

At the time of disestablishment, the raion consisted of three hromadas:

- Dolyna urban hromada with the administration in Dolyna;
- Vyhoda settlement hromada with the administration in the urban-type settlement of Vyhoda;
- Vytvytsia rural hromada with the administration in the selo of Vytvytsia.

== History ==
The history of Dolyna Raion, located in the Valley of Prykarpattia, dates back to the medieval times when the Ascension Monastery was built in the area and monks started chronicling the region in 1112. The City of Dolyna was granted Magdeburg rights in 1525. One of the oldest settlements in the district, Goshiv, was established in 1469.

In the 18th century, a rebellion against lords, led by the opryshkas, a mobile group of mountain population, broke out in the region. The Polish-Lithuanian Commonwealth was divided in 1772 and the Valley was occupied by the Austrian army. The town was later governed by Vaclav Zhevusky, a Polish headman, who was accused of mistreating the population by the townspeople in 1781. The Austrian administration then took direct control of the city. In 1791, the Valley lost its old privileges and the title of "Free Royal City".

In 1848, the lordship was completely abolished in Galicia, a significant event in the region's history. The Russian army occupied Galicia on August 21, 1914, and the Valley was captured by the Russians on September 8. On December 3, 1920, Dolyna County was included in the Stanislav Voivodeship of the Republic of Poland. In 1940, Dolyna District was formed from three components of Dolyna County, including the city of Dolyna and the communes of Rakhin and Broshniv.

In 1949, the underground of the OUN was most active in the villages of Trostyanets and Krekhovychi, according to the data of the regional administration of the MGB. Vyhodsky District was added to Dolyna District in 1957 and in 1962, the district was included in the Kalusa Industrial District. However, by 1965, Dolyna District was formed again.

== Geography ==
The Dolyna Raion is located in the northwestern part of the Ivano-Frankivsk region in western Ukraine. It is a part of the Carpathian Mountains and is known for its rich natural resources.

The district has a total area of 1.25 thousand km², with the district center located in the town of Dolyna, which is 58 km from the regional center. The district has been a part of the administrative-territorial division of Ukraine since 1939 and borders the Lviv, Transcarpathian, Rozhnytiv, and Kalush districts of the Ivano-Frankivsk region.

The natural resources of the region include oil, associated gas, salt, sulfur, iron ore, manganese, menilitic shale, brick clay, gravel and pebble deposits, and Carpathian sandstones. The area is also rich in peat deposits, with a deposit being developed in the village of Obolonya. There are also deposits of hydro-mineral resources on the territory of the district, some of which are used for the production of drinking and medical water.

=== Climate ===
The climate in the region is characterized by moderate continental, humid conditions with cool summers and mild winters. The average length of the frost-free period is 155–160 days, and the growing season lasts 205–215 days. Spring frosts typically end in the third decade of April, while autumn frosts usually begin in the third decade of September.

The region is divided into two distinct climatic zones based on the conditions of heat and moisture supply and the unique distribution of other meteorological factors. The first zone is excessively humid and moderately warm and is located in the foothills of the district. The second zone is also excessively humid and covers the mountainous part of the district. This zone is further divided into two vertical subdivisions, the first being moderately warm in the mountain valleys, the second being cool (up to 1000 m) and cold (above 1000 m).

Dolyna

Climate chart (precipitation, max. and min. temperature)
J	F	M	A	M	J	J	A	S	O	N	D
-6 −1 −4	-6 0 −3	-3 5 1	3 11 7	7 17 12	10 20 15	12 22 17	11 21 17	8 17 12	3 11 7	-1 5 2	-5 1 −2
- █ Average max. and min. temperatures in °C
- █ Precipitation totals in mm
- Source: https://weatherspark.com/y/91453/Average-Weather-in-Dolyna-Ukraine-Year-Round
Imperial conversion
J	F	M	A	M	J	J	A	S	O	N	D
-0.2 30 25	-0.2 32 27	-0.1 41 34	0.1 52 45	0.3 63 54	0.4 68 59	0.5 72 63	0.4 70 63	0.3 63 54	0.1 52 45	-0 41 36	-0.2 34 28
- █ Average max. and min. temperatures in °F
- █ Precipitation totals in inches

=== Natural resources ===
The region is also well-endowed with a range of natural minerals. The presence of oil and gas make it an important area for energy production, while salt, sulfur, and other minerals like iron ore and manganese are valuable resources for various industrial purposes. The menilitic shale, brick clay, and gravel and pebble deposits can be used for construction and road building. The Carpathian sandstones, known for their durability and beauty, are often used for architectural and decorative purposes.

The area also has substantial peat deposits, which are an important source of fuel and can be used for horticulture and agriculture. The presence of peat deposits in the villages of Obolonya and Knyazhaluka indicate the potential for future extraction and development.

Finally, the district is home to hydro-mineral resources, which are crucial for the production of drinking and medical water. These resources are carefully managed to ensure their sustainability and availability for future generations.

=== Hydrology ===
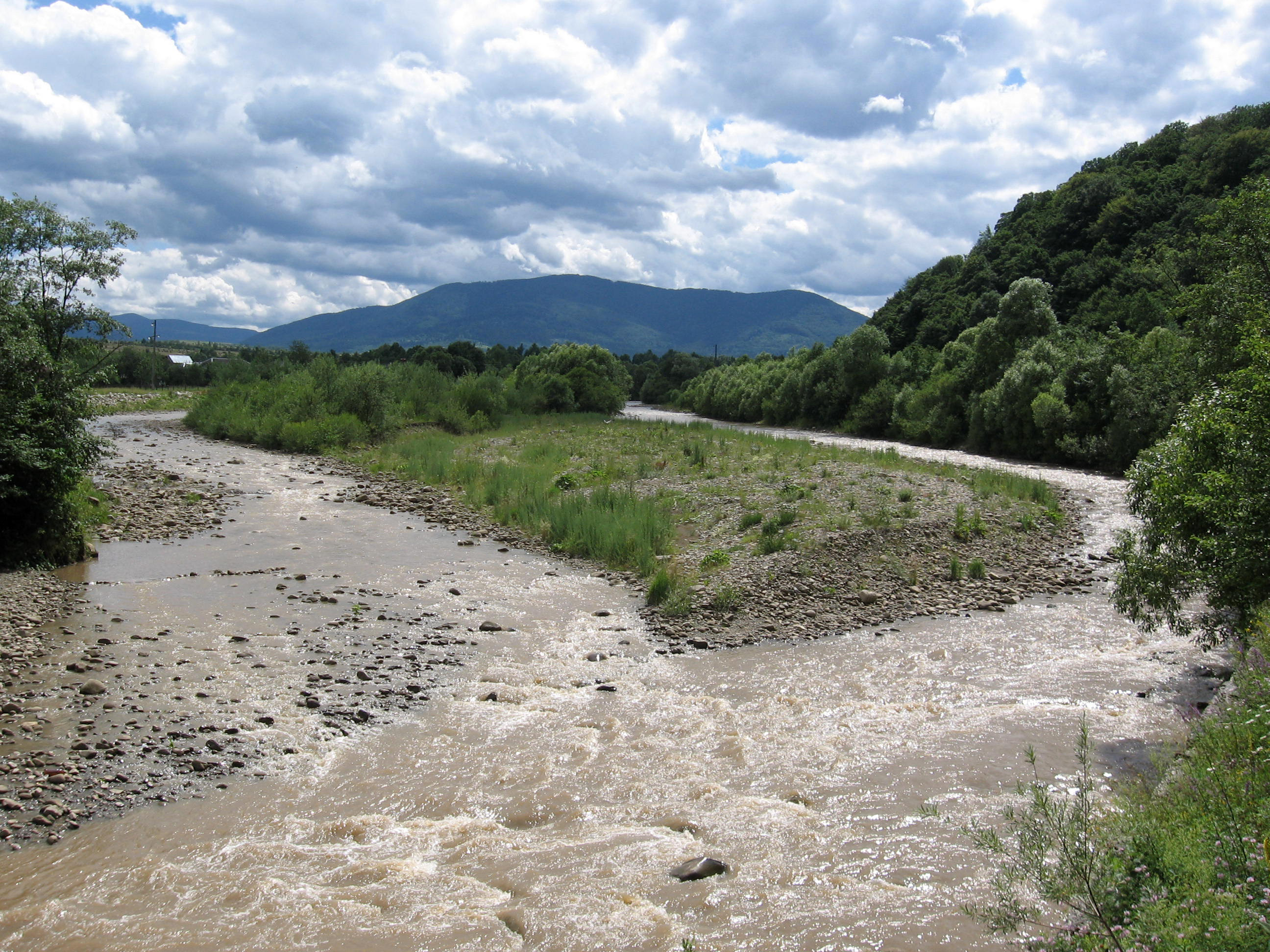
River Svicha

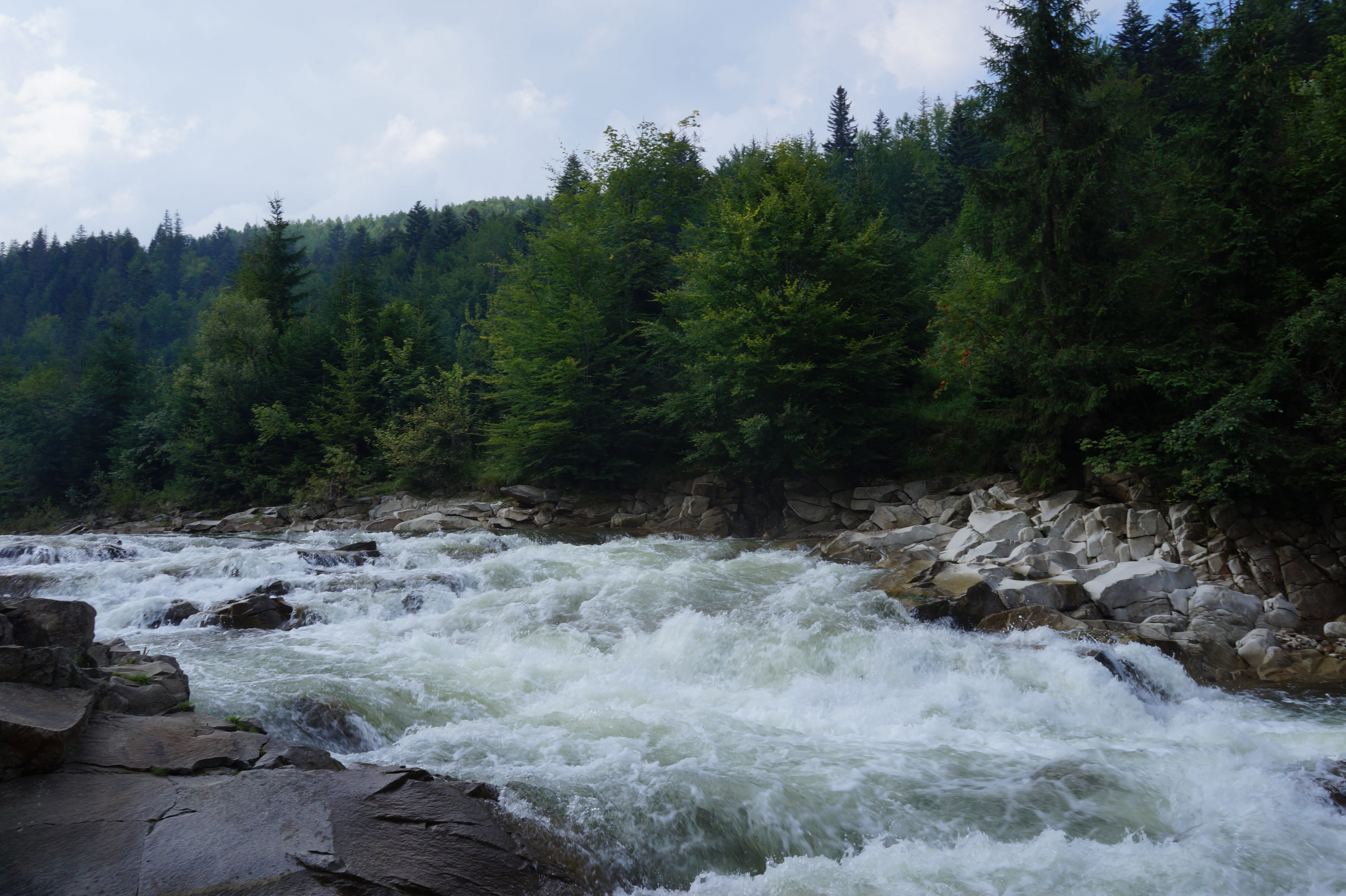
Mizunsky waterfall

The Dolynsky District is rich in water resources, with the largest river being the Svicha River that originates from the Vyshkiv Gorges ridge at an altitude of 1155 meters and has a total length of 167 kilometers. The Myzunka River, which is 51 kilometers long, is the second largest and drains into the Svicha River. Additionally, the Luzhanka River, which is 29 kilometers long, flows through the district. Other notable rivers in the area include the Turyanka River, the Sivka River (a tributary of the Dniester), and the Sadzhavka River. These rivers are characterized by their mountain-type nature, with an unstable water level regime that can rise to 3–4 meters.

The Dolynsky District is home to picturesque waterfalls such as the Mizunsky, Pravych, Gurkalo Luzhanskyi, and Gurkalo Lypivskyi waterfalls. While there are no large natural lakes in the area, one of the largest is the Dolyn Lake, which covers an area of 25 hectares and has an average depth of 2.5 meters and water reserves of approximately 600,000 cubic meters. There are also numerous artificial reservoirs, ponds, and lakes in the area that are primarily used for recreational purposes, with very little commercial fish being grown.

=== Wildlife and vegetation ===
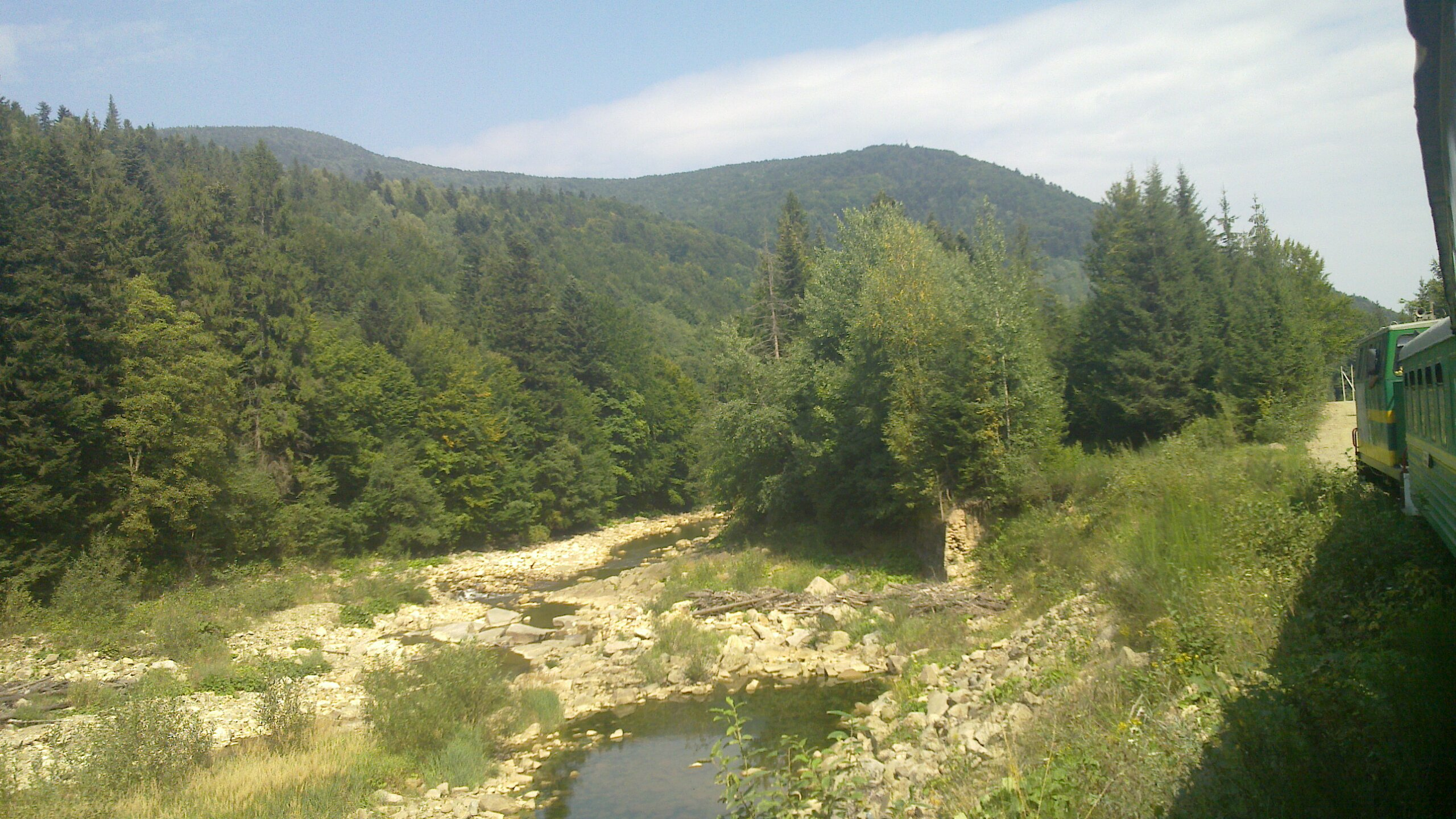
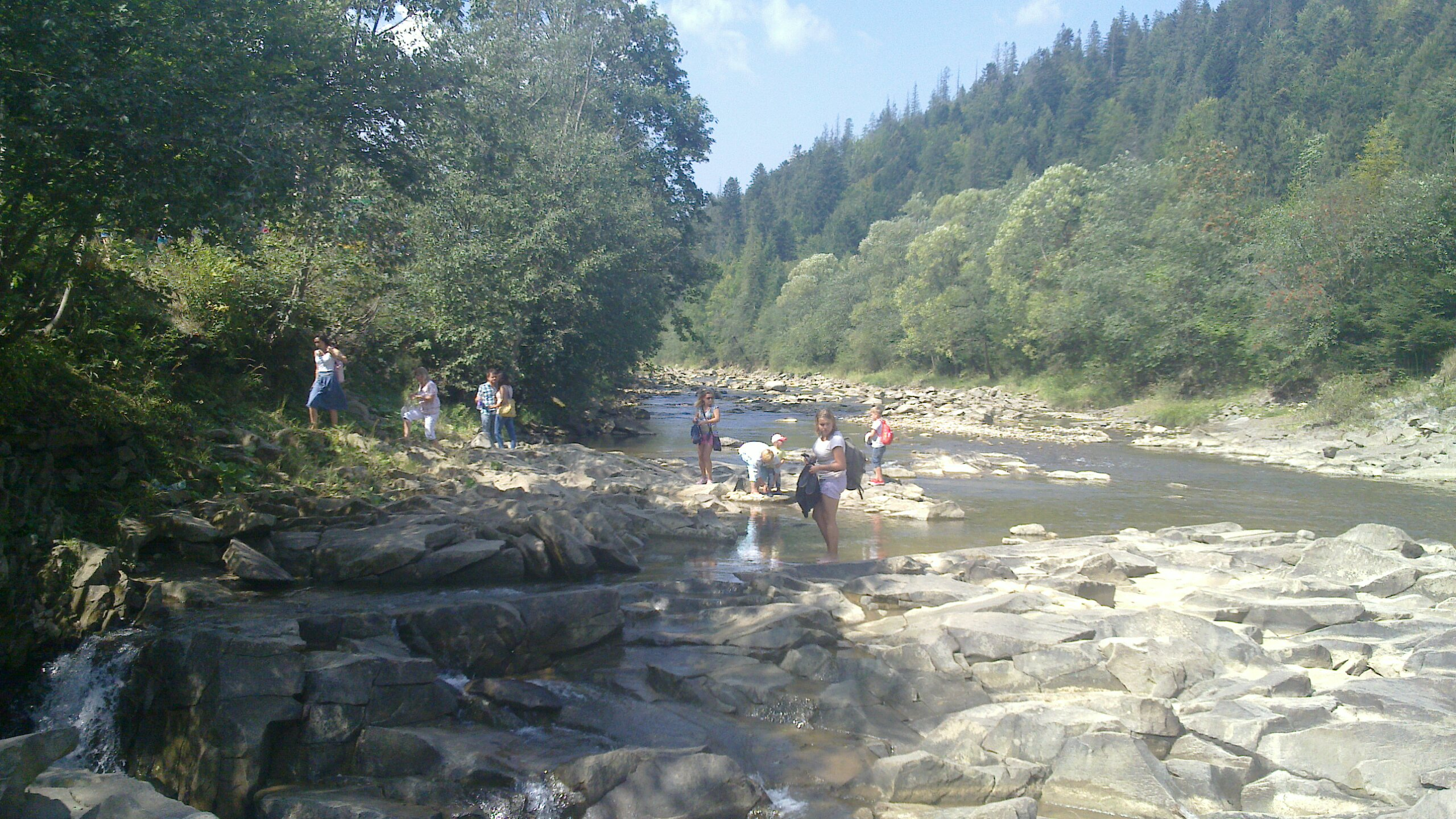
Forrests in Dolyna Raion

The forests in the district occupy a large area, and are managed by the Vyhoda State Forestry Enterprise and the Dolyna Specialized Inter-Economic Forestry Enterprise. These organizations are responsible for organizing the cutting of trees for primary use and for sanitary purposes.

The Carpathian mountain forests are abundant with natural berries such as strawberries, raspberries, blackberries, blueberries, and lingonberries. The forests are also home to a diverse range of wildlife, including deer, bears, roe deer, lynx, martens, and more.

== Demography ==
Age Group	Male	Female
In total	33,847	37,211
Up to 15 years	7800	7587
15-24	4846	4646
25-44	10,682	10,589
45-64	6845	8047
65-85	3557	5988
Over 85	117	384

Population pyramid 2011
%	Males	Age	Females	%
0.16		85+		0.50
0.28		80–84		0.73
0.76		75–79		1.77
1.78		70–74		2.65
2.15		65–69		3.25
2.22		60–64		3.04
1.79		55–59		2.27
2.46		50–54		2.87
3.13		45–49		3.10
4.13		40–44		4.16
3.76		35–39		3.89
3.45		30–34		3.44
3.67		25–29		3.37
3.44		20–24		3.18
3.36		15–19		3.32
4.41		10–14		4.31
3.64		5–9		3.51
2.86		0–4		2.86

=== National composition ===
National Demographic Breakdown Based on 2001 Census Data:

Nationality	Population	Percentage
Ukrainian	69818	98,25 %
Russians	791	1,11 %
Poles	155	0,22 %
Belarusians	77	0,11 %
Gypsies	44	0,06 %
Others	174	0,24 %

=== Linguistic Demarcation ===
Language	Speakers	Percentage
Ukrainian	70165	98,74 %
Russian	703	0,99 %
Romani	40	0,06 %
Belarusian	38	0,05 %
Moldovan	22	0,03 %
Other	91	0,13 %
