= Vytvytsia =

Village in Ivano-Frankivsk Oblast, Ukraine

Vytvytsia Витвиця
- Village
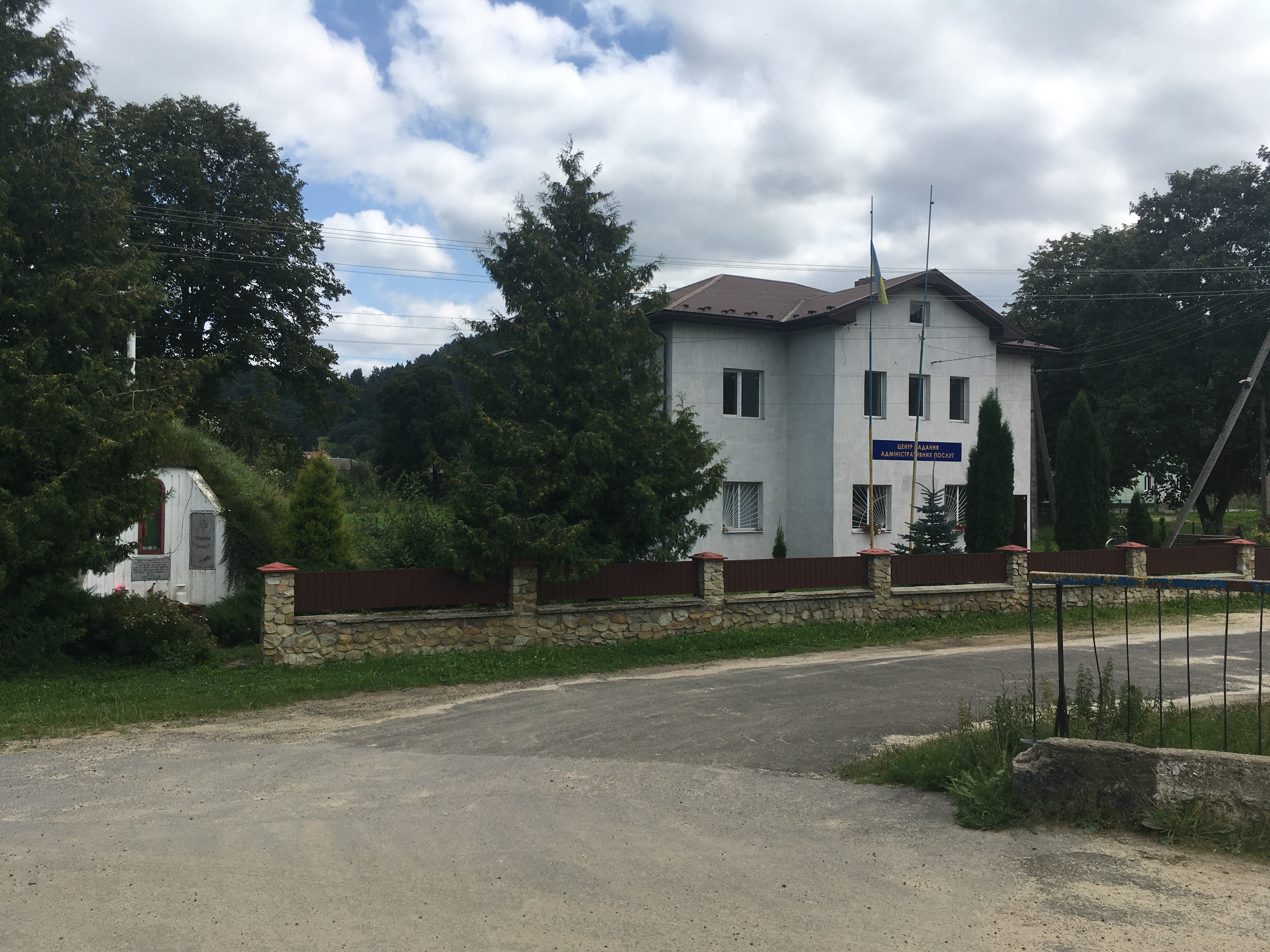
- The headquarters of Vytvytsia village council

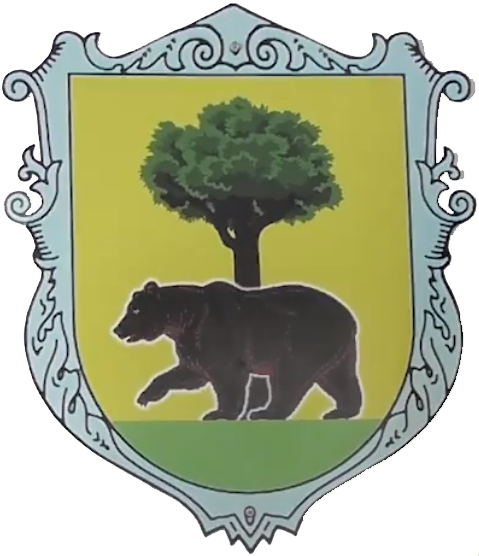
- Coat of arms
- Interactive map of Vytvytsia
- Location of Vytvytsia in Ivano-Frankivsk Oblast Location of Vytvytsia in Ukraine
- Coordinates: 48°59′26″N 23°50′38″E
- Country: Ukraine
- Oblast: Ivano-Frankivsk Oblast
- Raion: Kalush Raion
- First mentioned: 1397

Population
  - Total: 1,255

Vytvytsia (Ukrainian: Витвиця; Polish: Witwica) is a village in Ivano-Frankivsk Oblast, Ukraine, in Kalush Raion. It is the administrative centre of Vytvytsia rural hromada. Its population is 1,255 (as of 2023).

== History ==
Vytvytsia was first mentioned in 1397, in a document by Władysław II Jagiełło. In 1939 the village had 1,690 residents (1,640 Ukrainians, 20 Polish people, 20 Jews, and 10 Latynnyky), according to Volodymyr Kubijovyč.

There are two churches in the town; the wooden Church of Saint Ivan the Theologian (Ukrainian Greek Catholic Church) and the brick Church of Apostle Andrew the First-Called (Orthodox Church of Ukraine).

== Notable residents ==
- Pavlo Vytvytskyi, Ukrainian Greek Catholic priest and Organisation of Ukrainian Nationalists politician
- Stepan Volkovetskyi, Ukrainian diplomat and politician, People's Deputy of Ukraine
- Zenovii Krasivskyi, Ukrainian poet and Soviet dissident, co-founder of the Ukrainian Helsinki Group
- Mykhailo Seleshko, Organisation of Ukrainian Nationalists politician
- Petro Sichko, Ukrainian Insurgent Army soldier and Soviet dissident, member of the Ukrainian Helsinki Group
- Stepan Yanishevskyi, Ukrainian Insurgent Army commander
