= Criminal cases against supporters of Yulia Tymoshenko =

Ukrainian legal cases

Under President Viktor Yanukovych, the Government of Ukraine prosecuted Yulia Tymoshenko and many of her supporters and allies. Yanukovych beat Tymoshenko in the 2010 Ukrainian presidential election. Foreign observers criticized the prosecutions as politically motivated. Tymoshenko was imprisoned from 2011 to 2014, and was freed shortly before Yanukovych fell from power. Yanukovych subsequently fled to Russia and was convicted in absentia for treason.

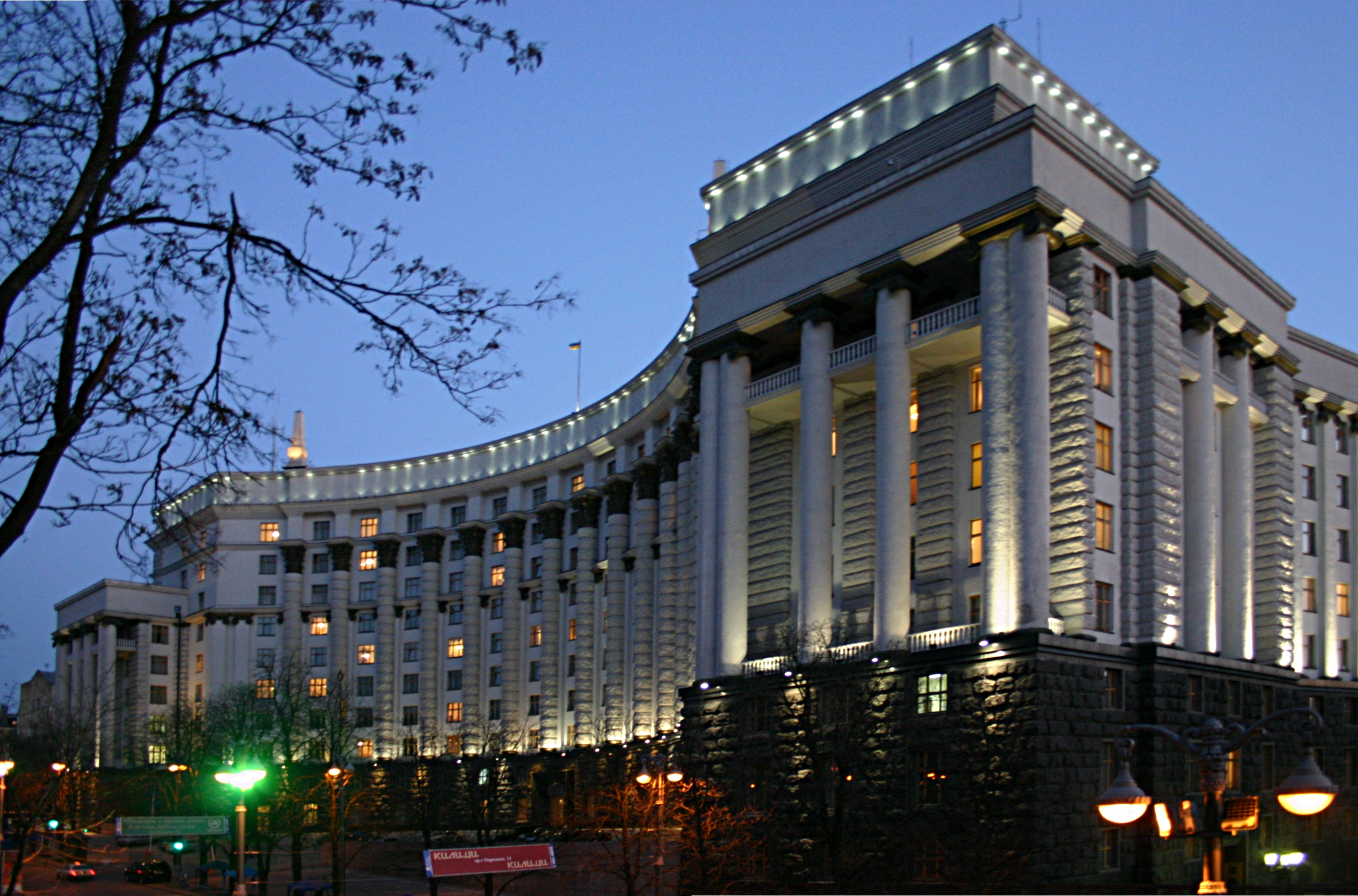
Building of Ukrainian Cabinet of Ministers

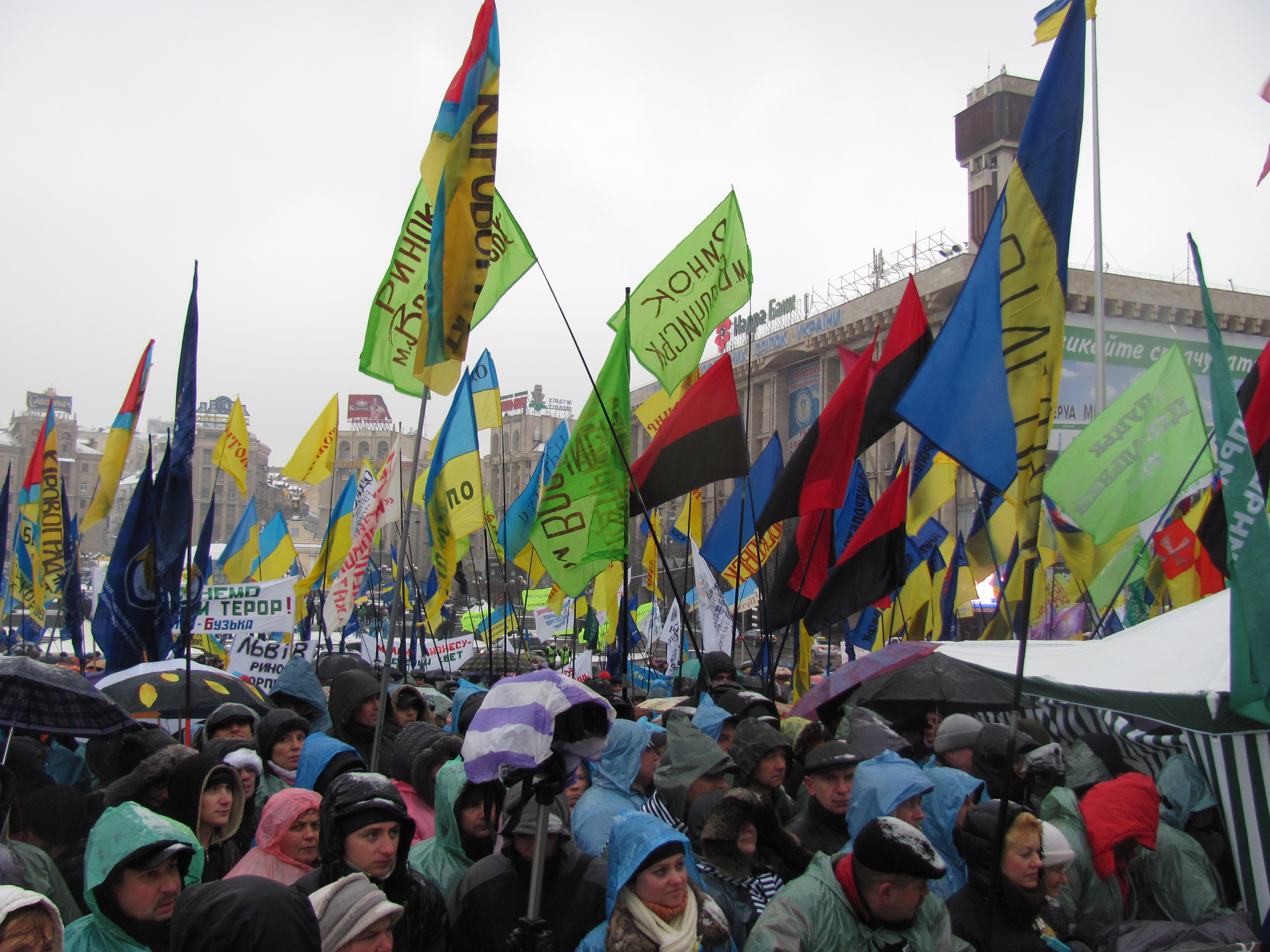
Tax Maidan, Kyiv. 29 November 2010

== Tymoshenko's associates who have been under prosecution since 2010 ==
Since April 2010, a number of criminal cases have been initiated against Yulia Tymoshenko and her associates.

Political persecutions in Ukraine over «members of government and Tymoshenko's associates» were widely discussed in mass media of Ukraine, Europe, Russia and the USA.

On 22 April 2010, Yanukovych announced that the General Prosecutor of Ukraine had opened more than 30 criminal cases against members of the previous government. In October 2011, more than fifteen members of Tymoshenko's Cabinet of Ministers were being prosecuted; half of them being on detention for 8–12 months. All of them were, basically, convicted in exceeding office authorities:

1) Prime-Minister Yulia Tymoshenko : «Tymoshenko herself was called in for questioning by authorities on at least nine occasions in December 2010».

2) Minister of Internal Affairs (4 February 2005 — 1 December 2006 and 18 December 2007 — 28 January 2010) — Yuriy Lutsenko.

3) Acting Minister of Defense (June 2009 — March 2010) — Valeriy Ivaschenko.

4) Minister of Finance (18 December 2007 — 11 March 2010) — Bohdan Danylyshyn (Russian pronunciation: «Danilishin»).

5) Minister of Environment Protection (December 2007 — March 2010) — Heorhiy Filipchuk.

6) First Deputy Head of the Minister for Justice (December 2007 — March 2010) — Yevgen Korniychuk.

7–8) Head of the Ukrainian Customs (28 January 2009 — 24 March 2010) — Anatoliy Makarenko. Deputy Head of the Energy Regional Customs — Taras Shepitko.

9–10) Head of the State Treasury of Ukraine (December 2007 — March 2010) — Tetyana Slyuz. First Deputy Head of the State Treasury (September 2009 — April 2010) — Tetyana Gritzun.

11–12) First Deputy Head of «Naftogaz» (state monopoly for oil and gas trading) (6 February 2008 — 24 March 2010) — Igor Didenko, Maria Kushnir — Deputy Chief Accountant of Naftogaz.

13) Minister of Construction (former mayor of Lviv) — Vasyl Kuybida.

14) Governor (Head of State Administration) of Dnipropetrovsk region (a former Minister for Transport and Communications) — Viktor Bondar.

15) Governor of Kharkiv region — Arsen Avakov.

16–18) Also, several former officials were repeatedly interrogated to start a criminal case, namely, First Deputy Prime Oleksandr Turchynov, but the cases have not been opened: «Former First Deputy Prime Oleksandr Turchynov was also called in for questioning at least six times in the last four months of the year (2010)».

Because of the threat of criminal prosecution against their relatives, such known politicians as the leader of Kyiv ByuT branch Anatoliy Semynoga and the leader of «Prosvita» organization Pavlo Movchan had to leave BYuT.

19) Head of the State Committee on the Material Reserve (a deputy minister of economy), former mayor of Mariupol in 1994–1998 (Donetsk region) — Mykhailo Pozhyvanov. Mykhailo Pozhyvanov has received a permit to live in Austria and has applied for political asylum.

20–27) Suing, also, started against the activists of the «Tax Maidan — 2010» which was held, in close co-operation, by the organization of small-size manufacturers and Tymoshenko's BYuT.

At the end of 2010 and the beginning of 2011, eight detained representatives of the «Spilna Sparava» (Common Cause) — entrepreneurs who (with the support of Tymoshenko's party) organized a «Tax Maidan».

28–32) On 12 October 2011, the General Procurator's Office of Ukraine announced the intention to resume the criminal cases (closed in 2003–2005 years) against Tymoshenko's relatives (Olexander Tymoshenko, Gennady Tymoshenko) as well as the employees of the UESU corporation Yevgen Shago, Antonina Bolyura, Lydia Sokolchenko (under the UESU case on supply of construction materials to Russia in 1996–1997).

In January 2011, Oleksandr Tymoshenko requested asylum in the Czech Republic due to «increasing pressure being put on the opposition leader through her family» and 6 January 2011 Oleksandr Tymoshenko granted Czech asylum.

33) In November 2012, the Procurator's Office informed about the criminal cases opened against the well-known ex-Deputy from the BYuT faction Andriy Shkil (a supporter of Ukrainian nationalist organizations UNA-UNSO and, also, one of the organizers of the protest action «Ukraine without Kuchma» held in March 2001. In December 2012, Shkil had to leave Ukraine for the Czech Republic.

34–36) Criminal cases were also started against a number of candidates for city mayors from the Batkivschina Party at the local elections in 2010. After the local election 2010, the Mayors of the cities of Zaporizhia, Kremenchuk, Novomoskovsk (and others) who had been elected from the «Batkivshchyna», were so heavily pressed that they had to leave the Party and claim their non-party belonging, otherwise they could not be given possibility to do their jobs.

== Assessment in Russia ==
The president and the prime minister of Russia also made a number of statements concerning the «politically motivated trial on Yulia Tymoshenko»; also, on 11 October 2011 the Russian Foreign Ministry officially said (see the site of the Foreign Ministry of Russia): «We cannot ignore the fact that leaders of many countries as well as world public take the whole of the judicial process as initiated, exclusively, by political motives».

Director of the Ukrainian affiliate of the Institute of CIS states (The Russian national institution for investigation of the CIS problems) Vladymir Kornilov pointed out that if Kyiv continue to ignore the EU, Russia and the US concerns about the "case of Yulia Tymoshenko" it could happen that Brussels would treat Ukraine like yet another Belarus».

== Assessment in US ==
On 5 October 2010, in Kyiv, Drago Kos, the president of the Group of States against Corruption (GRECO), stated he saw no improvements in the country's anticorruption efforts since the Yanukovych government took office.

On 30 December 2010, the US State Department notified the Ukrainian authorities on its concern about the cases against the Tymoshenko's team pointing out that «prosecution should not be either selective or politically motivated».

On 24 June 2011, the US State Department stated that the trial of Tymoshenko was a politically motivated process according to figures from the opposition.

=== Responses as for Tymoshenko sentence (after 11 October 2011) ===
On 11 October 2011 (on the day of Tymoshenko verdict), the US Presidential Administration called on «to release Yu. Tymoshenko as well as other political leaders and former government officials».

On 13 October 2011, Co-Head of the US Congress group of support for Ukraine Marcy Kaptur registered the draft resolution on «persecution of the opposition leader Yulia Tymoshenko and her associates».

- «The U.S. Senate's Foreign Relations Committee passed the draft of the resolution authored by James Inhofe (R-OK) and Dick Durbin (D-IL) on 19 September… The resolution suggested that the State Department introduce a visa ban on those responsible for her imprisonment and that the State Department and the Organization for Security and Cooperation in Europe (OSCE) apply pressure on Yanukovych to release Tymoshenko… Secretary of State Hillary Clinton demanded Tymoshenko's release early this year, so the resolution reflects the views of the Obama administration and not only the views of its authors».

22 January 2013 in a letter to Tymoshenko U.S. Secretary of State Hillary Clinton said: «I … want to reaffirm that the United States supports your immediate release. I hope the New year brings new prospects for your release and wish you a return to good health».

=== Overall assessment of the situation in Ukraine in 2010–2013 ===
1 February 2013 former U.S. Ambassadors to Ukraine (William Green Miller — 1993–1998, Steven Pifer — 1998–2000, John Herbst — 2003–2006) recommend the new U.S. Secretary of State John Kerry not to meet with Viktor Yanukovych and insist on Kyiv's compliance with democratic standards.

A report presented to the U.S. Senate by Director of National Intelligence James Clapper described Ukraine as "slipping into authoritarianism".

Writing in The Ukrainian Week, Oleksandr Mykhelson reported on the Yanukovych administration's use of lobbyists in Europe and the United States. In April 2013, The Economist wrote about the political situation in Ukraine:

- «With Viktor Yanukovych, a thuggish president, in charge and his arch-rival, Yulia Tymoshenko, in jail, Ukraine is clearly not a democracy. But it is not a dictatorship either… Oligarchs treat Ukraine as a cash cow… According to the Ukrainian edition of Forbes, companies linked to ten beneficiaries win 60% of all government contracts. The leader of the Forbes list is Alexander Yanukovych, the president's elder son… But politically Mr Yanukovych is not as strong as he seems… His defeat was most striking in Kyiv where the ruling party (Party of Regions) got under 13% of the vote (in October's parliamentary elections-2012)».

== Assessment of criminal cases of Tymoshenko's associates in EU ==
On 13 January 2011, the Czech Republic «granted an asylum» to ex-Minister for economics Bohdan Danylyshyn.

=== Assessment in the United Kingdom ===
On 22 June 2010 (just before the beginning of the trial of Tymoshenko), British Ambassador in Ukraine Leigh Tuner gave an interview to the Day newspaper in which he warned the Ukrainian authorities against persecution of the opposition:

- «We are carefully watching the development of criminal prosecution of the former government officials…we are concerned about the allegedly political grounds lying these criminal cases…. By presently, we have clearly defined to the Ukrainian authorities that whatever selectivity and inadequacy in exercising legal prosecutions might significantly, and for a long term, spoil the international image of Ukraine».

=== Six European Parliament resolutions on cases involving Yulia Tymoshenko and other former government officials ===
Within the period of 2010–2012, the European Parliament adopted six resolutions as regards the criminal cases of Tymoshenko and her associates.

On 9 June 2011, the European Parliament approved a resolution on Ukraine — «Cases of Yulia Tymoshenko and other officials of the former government»:

- «having regard to its previous resolutions on Ukraine and particularly that of 25 November 2010… having regard to the Statement of its President on the detention of Yulia Tymoshenko on 26 May 2011, having regard to the Statement by the spokesperson of EU High Representative Catherine Ashton on the case of Yulia Tymoshenko on 26 May 2011, having regard to the Statement by Commissioner Stefan Fule following his meeting with Yu. Tymoshenko on 24 March 2011… : 2. Expresses concern about the increased selective prosecution of figures from the political opposition in Ukraine».

On 25 October 2011 the European Parliament approved (by majority of 5 factions out of six) the resolution on Ukraine (the third during a year) in which having regard to the statements of the EU member-states, declared :

- «whereas a growing number of officials are being held criminally accountable for their actions including former government ministries, but mostly (deputy) heads of state departments and inspectorates, heads of sub-units of law-enforcement agencies, district court judges and heads of local authorities… the Parliament deplores the sentencing of former PM Yulia Tymoshenko (Par. 2 of the Resolution)… insists that all judicial proceedings against former and current senior government officials should be conducted in accordance with European standards» (Par.6 of the Resolution).

On 13 December 2012, the European Parliament approved the sixth resolution to show concerns about political arrests of «Tymoshenko's associates»:

- The European Parliament «expresses regret at the fact that according to the OSCE, PACE, NATO Parliamentary Assembly and European Parliament observers, the electoral campaign, electoral process and post-electoral process failed to meet major international standards». In particular, it concerns such aspect as «the arrest of opposition political leaders» The Resolution calls on Ukrainian authorities «to free and rehabilitate politically persecuted opponents, including Yulia Tymoshenko, Yury Lutsenko and others» (European Parliament Resolution of 13 December 2012 on the situation in Ukraine 2012/2889 (RSP), Human Rights Committee, European Parliament, Brussels).

=== PACE, OSCE resolutions ===
On 26 January, PACE adopted the resolution on "The Functioning of Democratic Institutions in Ukraine". It points out the political character of criminal cases against the ministers of Tymoshenko's government (including those of Jurij Luzenko, Valeriy Ivashchenko, Bohdan Danylyschyn, Georgy Filipchuk, general Anatoliy Makarenko, Eugene Korniychuk).

The resolution, also, calls on the Ukrainian government "to consider all legal means available to release these members of the former government and to allow them to stand for the upcoming parliamentary elections" in autumn of 2012. For the first time, it mentions the possibility of introducing "sanctions" against some of the Ukrainian top officials now in power. However the Ukrainian government has, actually, ignored the key requirements of the resolution and no «sanctions» were applied (during, at least, the year 2012).

On 11 July 2012, OSCE resolution was adopted on Ukraine, which declared that «there should not be any political prisoners» and called on Ukraine "to free all political prisoners".

=== European Court of Human Rights ===
On 3 July 2012, the European Court of Human Rights recognized Lutsenko's arrest «arbitrary» and his human rights «breached». As Jean-Claude Mignon, president of the Council of Europe's Parliamentary Assembly said, the trial «had been politically motivated» and «charges were absolutely no justification for a prison sentence».

== The case of ex-minister for economics Bohdan Danylyshyn ==
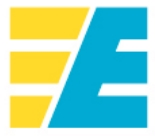
The logo of the Ministry of Economic Development and Trade (Ukraine)

On 5 August 2010 Bohdan Danylyshyn flew to Germany.

On 12 August 2010 the General Procurator's Office of Ukraine started a criminal case against minister for economics in Tymoshenko government (2007–2010) Bohdan Danylyshyn convicted in abusing his power and exceeding his office authorities under Part 2 Article 364 of the Criminal Code of Ukraine. Danylyshyn was announced for international search. On 18 October 2010 Danylyshyn came from Germany to the «Ukrainian Embassy in the Czech Republic» where his lawyer allegedly had agreed about a «meeting for the sake of reconciliation» but after that meeting Danylyshyn was detained on 18 October 2010 by Czech Police (at Interpol request) when he was leaving the Ukrainian Embassy in Prague.

Being imprisoned, Danylyshyn applied for a «political asylum» and was granted a political asylum in the Czech Republic on 12 January 2011.

On 26 September 2013, all criminal cases against Danylyshyn were closed, and he was questioned as a witness. Danylyshyn said:

- «Interrogation touched my cases, completion of airport "Borispol" and others. But all the prosecution was ceased. Currently I have not got any problems with the Ukrainian authorities».

Media indicate that these criminal cases are closed only with a view to preparing the Association Agreement EU and Ukraine. This unexpected termination of criminal cases has shown that the prosecutor's office of Ukraine may unnecessarily open criminal cases against innocent people, and can unexpectedly close criminal cases without explanation or apology.

== The case of ex-minister for defense Ivaschenko ==
The logo of the Ministry of Defense of Ukraine

On 24 August 2010, ex-minister for defense Valery Ivaschenko was arrested, the Prosecutor General's Office opened a criminal case against Ivaschenko under Part 2, Article 364 of the Criminal Code of Ukraine (abuse of power or office). He was charged with adoption of an illicit decision as for sale of the property belonging to the Feodosia ship-mechanical plant.

On 20 June 2011, V. Ivaschenko announced a hungry strike as a protest against his detention, however because of sudden deterioration of his health he had to terminate his action.

On 12 April 2012, Pechersky District Court of Kyiv has sentenced former Acting Defense Minister of Ukraine Valeriy Ivaschenko to five years in prison and barred him from fulfillment of organizational and administrative activities in state agencies for three years. He was accused of abuse of power. Ivashchenko called the Prosecutor General of Ukraine «criminal organization» and warned judges and prosecutors on criminal liability for illegal, unlawful actions and decisions. According to him, «it's only a matter of time». Last week, the District Court of Kyiv Solomensky sentenced to three years imprisonment of former Environment Minister Georgy Filipchuk.

In August 2012 year the Appeal court of Kyiv has reduced the sentence, replacing the real term for identification. The European Union Delegation has issued the statement in agreement with the EU Heads of Mission in Ukraine :

- «The Delegation takes note of the release of Mr Ivaschenko after nearly two years in detention, during which his health condition deteriorated», «a now suspended sentence due to be appealed by the defence».

In January 2013 Ivashchenko went abroad. 14 January 2013 Valery Ivaschenko was granted political asylum in Denmark.

== The case of ex-minister for environment protection Georgy Philipchuk ==
Logo of the Ministry of Ecology and Natural Resources of Ukraine

On 14 December 2010, ex-minister for Ukrainian environment protection Georgy Filipchuk was taken under arrest:

- «The General Procurator's Office of Ukraine, on 13 December 2010, opened a criminal case against former minister for Ukrainian environment protection Georgy Philipchuk for the evidence of crime specified by p.2 art.364 of the Criminal Code of Ukraine (an office abuse) which resulted in ill consequences». Filipchuk was incriminated co-acting as for the case on Kyoto money (see Legal proceedings against Yulia Tymoshenko since 2010 year).

On 8 April 2011 the procurators informed about Georgy Filipchuk release from jail «for the reason of terminating the process of investigation on the case materials».

5 April 2012, the Solomiansky District Court of Kyiv sentenced former Environment Minister Heorhiy Filipchuk to three years in prison, finding him guilty under Part 3, Article 365 of the Criminal Code of Ukraine. Filipchuk was convicted for abuse of office and power over the signing of an agreement with the AstapovLawyers law firm on the provision of consultations to the Environment Ministry during the consideration of a dispute at international law institutes regarding the cancellation of an agreement signed between the Ukrainian government and Vanco International Ltd. on the development of the Black Sea shelf.

In accordance with the decree of 7 April 2013 (under the proposal of the Presidential Commission on Pardons) president Yanukovych pardoned six prisoners: in particular, ex-Minister of Environmental Protection Heorhiy Filipchuk was released from the principal and additional sentences.

== The case of former first deputy minister for Justice Korniychuk ==
On 22 December 2010 procurators arrested former first deputy minister for justice (in Tymoshenko's Cabinet of Ministers) Yevgen (Eugene) Korniychuk; he is a son-in-law of Vasyl Onopenko, head of the Supreme Court of Ukraine. Korniychuk was detained on the day when his wife gave birth to their baby — two days after, the newly born baby got in a reanimation. Just several weeks later, Yevgen Korniychuk was released under condition of «travel limitation» (after Vasyl Onopenko had seen President Yanukovich).

On 15 February 2011 the Procurators Office changed the measure of suppression for a recognizance not to leave.

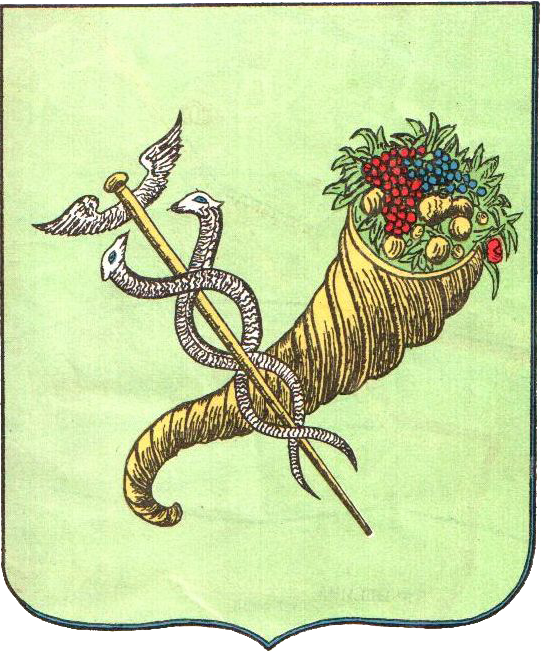
Coat of arms of Kharkiv

== The case of Arsen Avakov, ex-governor of Kharkiv region ==
Governor of Kharkiv region Arsen Avakov — had to stay in Italy for almost a year where he was given an asylum. In November 2012 Avakov was elected to parliament and returned to Ukraine.

== The case of ex-minister for regional development and construction Vasyl Kuybida ==
Coat of arms of Lviv

In June 2010 the criminal case was started against Vasyl Kuybida (the minister of regional development and construction in Tymoshenko's government in 2007–2010; the mayor of Lviv in 1994–2002; a doctor of sciences in the field of state administration). The Office of State Security (SBU) convicted Kuybeda in that he had appointed, without announcing a contest, a head of the state office for architectural — and -construction monitoring in the Rivnenska region. The trial started in August 2010 but was over and over postponed — for September, October, November.

Kuybida witnessed that according to the regulation, in case if an applicant for the position of the regional head for architectural and construction monitoring was approved by the minister and agreed on with the governor, a contest should not be conducted. Ex-governor of the Rivnenska region Victor Matchuk confirmed Kuybida's witnessing.

On 13 December 2010 the a. m. case was suspended following the decision of the Shevchenkovsky District Court of the city of Kyiv. The prosecutor made a protest against closing the case, but on 14 January 2011 the Kyiv Appeal Court confirmed the decision on terminating the case.

Vasyl Kuybida said that the case was initiated with the aim not to let him take part in the election for the position of Mayor of Lviv:

- "They started "to hook" me as soon as I had conducted consultations as for my might-be participation in balloting for the position of a city Mayor. After that, I was enforced to spend lots of time in Kyiv and, hence, to give up the idea of taking part in the elections. Therefore, finally they managed to get that I was not on balloting».

True, the local elections in Ukraine were held on 31 October 2010 — and soon after «the case of Kuybida» was closed. It is worth mentioning that prior to the local elections in Ukraine, criminal cases were launched against mayors of a number of locations".[37][36]

After the final fall of Yushchenko's rating, since 2010 Kuibida stands firmly on the side of Tymoshenko. In June 2013, he said:

- "Tymoshenko has proven to the world that it is possible to set the tone and manage complex political processes even behind bars, meaning that her neutralization from the political arena has failed once again».

Coat of arms of Dnipropetrovsk

== The case of Victor Bondar, ex-governor of Dnipropetrovsk region ==
16 June 2010 Viktor Bondar said : «I left the policy».

On 24 December 2010, ex-minister for transport, ex-governor of the Dnipropetrovsk region Victor Bondar was detained by the procurators. Strictly speaking, Bondar joined the team of Prime-Minister Tymoshenko in the months on the very eve of presidential election-2010, nevertheless his support (as governor of one of the largest regions of Ukraine) was very important in the course of election campaign.

V. Bondar's case was opened in relation to his work as acting minister for transport in the year 2006 in Yekhanurov's government (after the previous minister for transport Ye. Chervonenko had been sacked) at the time of construction of the bus station Teremki in Kyiv — losses were estimated at 5 mln grn (about $950 thousand). Viktor Bondar was charged under Part 5 Article 27, Part 2 Article 194, Article 353 of the Criminal Code of Ukraine — complicity in intentional elimination of stranger property resulting in heavy losses, combined with willful appropriation of office duties.

After his release from prison Viktor Bondar was not involved in politics in 2011–2012. However, in autumn 2012 Viktor Bondar took part in the parliamentary elections as «independent candidate» — in the electoral district No. 191 in western Ukraine. He won the election because he was perceived as an opponent of «Party of Regions», but in parliament joined the faction «Party of Regions». Although in January 2013 Viktor Bondar voted for the «Law for the release of Tymoshenko and Lutsenko».

== The criminal cases on the gas crisis RosUkrEnergo and Gazprom (January 2009) ==
=== Chronology of events as for the RosUkrEnergo claim to the Stockholm Arbitral Court ===
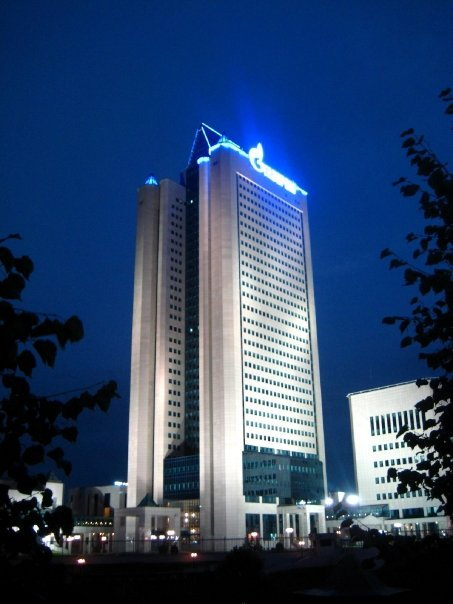
The main office of «Gazprom» in Moscow

The logo of the Ministry of Fuel and Energy of Ukraine

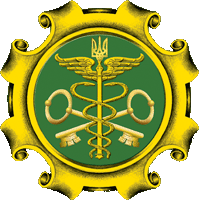
The logo of the State Customs Service of Ukraine

For the first time RosUkrEnergo put a suit against NAK Naftogaz of Ukraine in April 2008 (to the Arbitrary Court under the Stockholm Chamber of Commerce), but in January 2009, RosUkrEnergo claimed on Naftogas another three suits. Naftogaz filed four counter-claims as for RosUkrEnergo. All the claims on the issue were combined under one case.

On 2 April 2010, The Stockholm Arbitrary Court approved the interim decision (concerning the claims of RosUkrEnergo towards NAK Naftogaz of Ukraine as for $2 bln) and obliged Naftogaz to pay back the borrowed $19 mln.

On 8 July 2010, The Stockholm Arbitrary Court adopted a decision (based on «amicable settlement» under which Naftogaz of Ukraine had admitted all the RosUkrEnergo claims) according to which NAK Naftogaz of Ukraine was bound to return to RosUkrEnergo «11 bln cub.m of gas plus 10% of compensation».

Those 11 bln cun. m. of Russian gas were destined, in January 2009, to RosUkrEnergo (RUE), but RosUkrEnergo did not pay to Gazprom for it. Therefore, in 2009:

- Naftogaz paid off the debt of RosUkrEnergo to Gazprom in the amount of $1.7 bln, and in return, Gazprom transferred Naftogaz the a.m. 11 bln of gas as compensation (that is, at the price of $156 per 1000 cub.m.).
- Also, RosUkrEnergo was expelled from the gas supply scheme (within Ukraine and beyond its boundaries); the Gas Agreement was concluded directly between the state-owned companies Naftogaz and Gazprom. Prior to April 2010, Gazprom owned 50% of RosUkrEnergo shares, but in April 2010, Gazprom withdrew as co-founder of RosUkrEnergo — RosUkrEnergo became a fully private company with a controlling block of shares at Firtash's hands.

During the period from November 2010 to April 2011, Nagtogaz transferred to the Swiss company RosUkrEnergo 12.1 bln cub.m of gas (11 bln + 10% of compensation); the RUE paid Nagtogaz back $1.7 bln. As for the year 2011 (at the gas price for the EU being $490 per 1000 cub.m.), the total value of the transferred gas should have been no less than $5.4 bln.

The Firtash's point of view can be seen from his interview to the Focus magazine.

=== The case of Igor Didenko, Anatoly Makarenko ===
On 23 June 2010 Anatoly Makarenko, ex-head of the Ukrainian Customs was jailed.

On 8 July 2010, arrested was Igor Didenko, former first deputy head of Naftogaz.

On 22 July 2010 first deputy procurator general Victor Pshonka (half a year later he has already become a procurator general) informed: «Taras Shepitko, a deputy head of a department of the Energy Regional Customs was taken under guard» (21 July 2010). Pshonka emphasized that the decisions of the Stockholm Court could not be taken as ground to launch a criminal case.

All the three people were blamed for that they, within the terms of the Ukrainian-Russian interstate Agreement of 19 January 2009 (aimed at overcoming Ukrainian-Russian gas crisis−2009), had cleared and placed into a balance account of the state-owned company NAK Naftogaz 11 bln cub.m. of gas from the Gazprom company (supplied originally for the Swiss company Rosukrenergo but not paid by it); exactly that Rosukrenergo indebtedness of 1.7 bln USD, was the principal reason why Russia stopped, for 20 days, gas transition to Ukraine and Europe in January 2009).

=== The case of Taras Sheptko in March 2009 ===
Yet under president Yushchenko, on 2 March 2009, the Office of Ukrainian Security, SBU (head — Nalivaichenko, first deputy head — Khoroshkovsky) started the criminal case as for the fact, allegedly, of appropriation by Naftogaz « of 6.3 bln cub.m. of transited natural gas for the amount of more that 7.4 bln. Grn (nearly 1 bln. USD)». Under this case, detained was deputy head of a Department of Energy Regional Customs Taras Shepitko. However Igor Didenko acting as head of the Naftogaz Managing Board appealed against the decision to open the case in «the Shevchenkovsky District Court of the city of Kyiv». On 24 March 2009 the Shevchenkovsky District Court recognized as unlawful the SBU particular actions and rejected the SBU decision to open the a.m. case.

=== The case of Maria Kushnir — Deputy Chief Accountant of Naftogaz ===
Maria Kushnir was the fourth convict in the «gas case of RosUkrEnergo» (under which Didenko, Makarenko, Shepitko were arrested).

On 23 July 2010, the Office of Ukrainian Security (SBU) initiated a criminal case against «deputy chief accountant of Naftogaz» Maria Kushnir. On 26 July 2010, the Pechersky District Court of the city of Kyiv sanctioned the detention of Kushnir. Head of SBU Valery Khoroshkovsky claimed that Kushnir had been appointed to that job in the Naftogaz of Ukraine specially to take part in customs clearance of the gas belonging to RosUkrEnergo; « Her only duty was just to fix the needed signature. It was exactly she who gave orders to place the gas into the balance account of the Naftogaz, and who signed the origin of the document».

At first, Kushnir was incriminated «p.2 art.367 of the Criminal Code of Ukraine» (duty negligence resulted in ill losses) pursuant which it might be up to a three-year sentence. However, on 9 September 2010, the criminal case was opened against Kushnir under p. 2 art.364 of the Criminal Code of Ukraine («abuse of office duties» causing ill consequences).

On 10 September 2010 due to mutual actions with the law-enforcement bodies of the Russian Federation, Kushnir was detained in the Volgograd region (the Russian Federation) and a month later was extradited to Ukraine. Since then, (and until October 2011) M. Kushnir had been in a detained centre (SIZO), there was not any information on further developments round her case in mass media.

=== Release of Makarenko and Shepitko after a year of being kept in detention centre (SIZO) ===
On 5 July 2011, Makarenko and Shepitko were unexpectedly released from detention but their criminal cases were not terminated and there still existed «restrictions to travel». The press saw the connections between Makarenko's freeing and the coming meeting (on 6 July 2011) of the Russian Prime Minister Putin and President Yanukovich in the Crimea. Yet in the summer of 2010, «commanders of the Russian Navy» (who have known Makarenko since his years in the Russian navy) applied to V.Putin and V. Yanukovich with the request to release Makarenko from detention. Putin expressed his support for the request in his speech on the Day of Russian Navy, 2010.

In response to Makarenko release, in the Ukrainian mass media there appeared «information leaked from deputies representing radically opposed factions of the Verkhovna Rada that, presumably, Russia advised Ukraine to "stop persecutions of Tymoshenko"». Also, at the press-conference in Moscow on 7 July 2011 on the results of Putin-Azarov talks, Prime Minister Putin said that Russia was against re-consideration of «the gas agreement of 19 January 2009» and, as he thought, criticism of that agreement by Ukrainian government had a «political constituent; an intention to impose the opinion that the predecessors had everything done badly».

20 July 2012 Kyiv's Pechersky district court returned a verdict under former head of Ukraine's Customs Anatoly Makarenko, he was sentenced to four years’ imprisonment with a delay of penalty.

== Heads of State Treasury's Office: Tetyana Slyuz and Tetyana Hrytzun ==
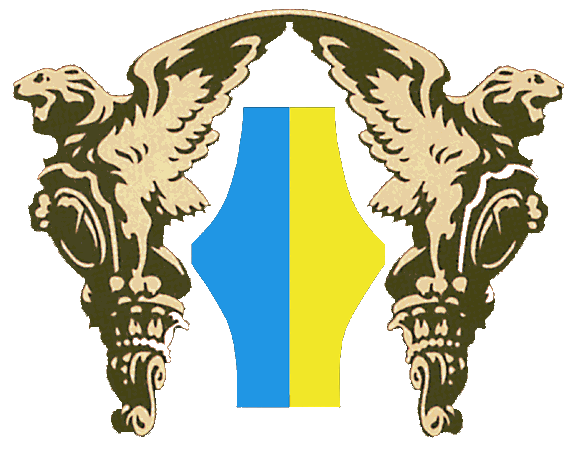
The logo of the National Bank of Ukraine. State Treasury of Ukraine — structural unit of the National Bank

=== Tetyana Slyuz ===
On 24 December 2010 Tetyana Yaroslavivna (Head of Ukrainian State Treasury's Office) was declared to be on search; she was incriminated in relation to the case of Kyoto money (see Legal proceedings against Yulia Tymoshenko since 2010). The prosecutors affirmed that Slyuz was staying abroad.

21 February 2011, Yulia Tymoshenko said about Tetyana Slyuz :

- «The police are visiting her 77-year-old mother. Oleksiy Sytnykiv is threatening her with some strange things, telling her that her daughter was killed by opposition forces… Tetyana Slyuz's son, Andriy, is also being dragged to questionings».

In the parliamentary elections of 2012 Tatiana Sliuz was elected member of parliament, and received parliamentary immunity.

=== Tetyana Hrytzun, first deputy head of the Ukrainian State Treasury's Office ===
On 19 July, detained was Tetyana Hrytzun (former first deputy head of the Ukrainian State Treasury's Office). On 22 July 2010, The Pechersky District Court gave sanction to her arrest — she was charged with «abuse of power or official authorities that led to serious consequences» (Part 2 of Article 364 of the Criminal Code of Ukraine foresees 3–6 years in jail):

- «According to investigators, from September 2009 through April 2010 she gave instructions to her subordinates not to transfer UAH 800 million ($100 million) of competition guarantees to bidder companies in a tender for the privatization of the Odesa Port-Side Plant (OPSP), Nortima Ltd. and to Frunze-Flora, in spite of an order on the return of the funds issued by the State Property Fund».

As of October, 11th, 2011, Tetyana Hrytzun was kept at the detention centre (SIZO).

The main point of the conflict around the Odesa Port-Side Plant is as follows:
— Prime Minister Tymoshenko is intention was, via privatization of the strategic enterprise OPSP, to substantially inject into the state budget in «the crisis 2009 year». It was, also, the time, when Ukraine was preparing to the presidential election. President Yushchenko fought against Tymoshenko, and he vetoed privatization of the Odesa Port-Side Plant. Due to that, «the most affluent investors» did not take part in the auction; the claims for participation were presented by just three companies. At the auction, the price, practically, remained at its basic level. The auction was won by the firm «Nortima» (owned by Ihor Kolomoyskyi), but Tymoshenko informed that the plant would not be sold off so as «the participants had agreed about the minimal price». In response, Kolomoyskyi promised to start suing while Tymoshenko stopped discharging pledges deposited by the firms «Nortima» and «Frunze-Flora». But the third member of the auction — the Russian company «Azot-Service» (which represented the interests of Gazprom) immediately received the money that previously made a pledge at the auction. Tymoshenko explained that at the moment the state has no money to spend (the crisis 2009 year), but promised to immediately repay the full amount as soon as the plant will be privatized.

== The case of ex-minister for internal affairs Yury Lutsenko ==
The logo of the Ministry of Internal Affairs of Ukraine

On 26 December 2010, ex-minister for internal affairs of Ukraine Yuriy Lutsenko was detained. Three criminal cases were initiated against Lutsenko :

- For overrated pension for his driver (by almost 100 euro per month and, also, 2.5 thousand euros were paid at one installment, when retired).
- For money spent on celebration of the Militia Day in the Ukraina Palace in 2008–2009 [52] — during two years, it was spent, all in all, about 600,000 grn (about 60,000 euros).
- For unlawful pursuing the figures involved into the case of Yushchenko poisoning (p. 3 art. 364 of the Criminal Code — abuse of power duties by an officer of law-enforcement body).

=== Starvation by Yuriy Lutsenko — 30 days, and 25 kg of weight loss ===
As a protest against his unlawful detention, on 23 April 2011 Yuriy Lutsenko started a hunger strike (during his starvation, he fully stopped eating, but drank coffee with sugar). On 28 April he signed his formal letter addressed to the SIZO authorities with which he informed about «his will to stop eating». Before 10 May he had already lost 19.5 kg of weight and was placed into the medical unit of the Lukyanovsky SIZO (a detention centre) because of worsening of his physical state. That same day, he was sent to the Kyiv Emergency hospital in 3, Bratislavska street. On 19 May, his condition was so bad, that «his veins were dripped with glucose solution». The 23 May 2011 was the day of a trial which had to settle the question on «measures of suppression» (that is, Lutsenko might have been released). Lutsenko ceased starvation only after the trial, on 23 May (thus, having sustained a 30-day hunger strike and lost nearly 25 kg of weight). He said:

- "I think, it is not expedient to go on with starvation. I started it to bring to the knowledge that in our Ukraine there are no procurators. Due to today's trial I've managed to let everyone know that we do not have a justified court; however, further on, I need to be in good health to break all that down".

After the hunger strike Lutsenko has deteriorated state of health. In January 2013, Yuri Lutsenko had surgery on his intestines.

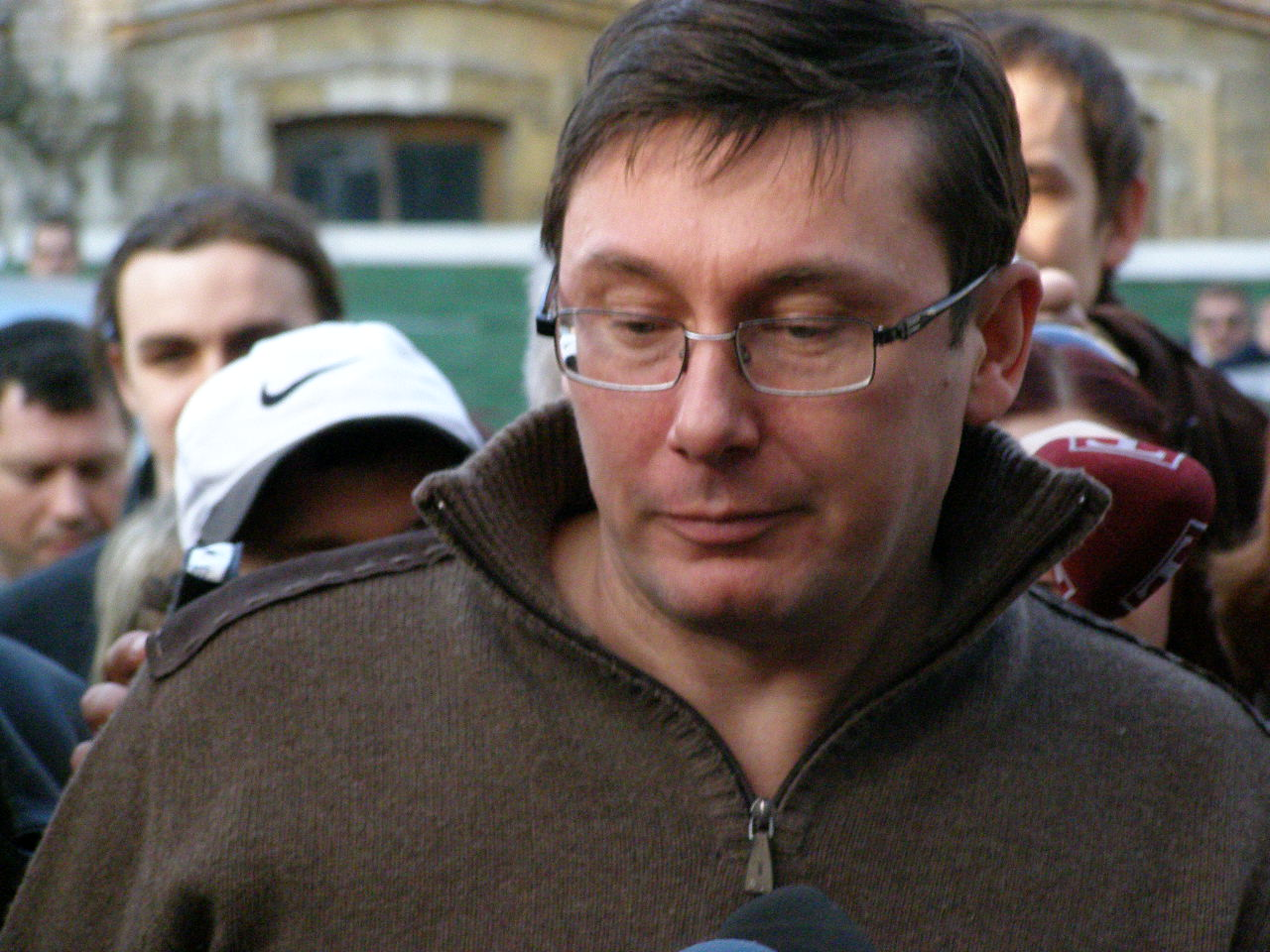
Yuriy Lutsenko in opposition (20 March 2007), seven months before the early elections to the Verkhovna Rada.

=== Letters from jail ===
From a jail Lutsenko had written (by June 2011) six letters — publicist articles on actual political issues.

=== Lutsenko refused to plead guilty and ask for pardon ===
Lutsenko and his family had repeatedly stated that they would not seek a pardon, because they believe the charges where groundless and political punishment.

On 3 July 2012, the European Court of Human Rights recognized Lutsenko's arrest «arbitrary» and his human rights «breached».

On 21 July 2012, Lutsenko was supported by the head of the Committee of Parliamentary Co-Operation of EC-Ukraine in the European Parliament, Marek Sivec (a former head of the Bureau for the National Security of Poland). He officially applied to the Ukrainian authorities with the request to release Yu. Lutsenko until the beginning of a trial under his personal guarantee:

- «I have made a decision to apply to the fully authoritative legal bodies of Ukraine with the request to take into consideration my personal guarantee as for Lutsenko's release and to make it possible for him to feel free when responding before the court». Sivec reminded of the Resolution of the Europarliament which established «growing persecutions of the previous cabinet officials and opposition».

=== Pardon Lutsenko ===
7 April 2013 a decree by Yanukovych pardoned Lutsenko (under the proposal of the Presidential Commission on Pardons) for health reasons and «to decriminalize and humanize Ukrainian legislation».

== Tax Maidan-2010 ==
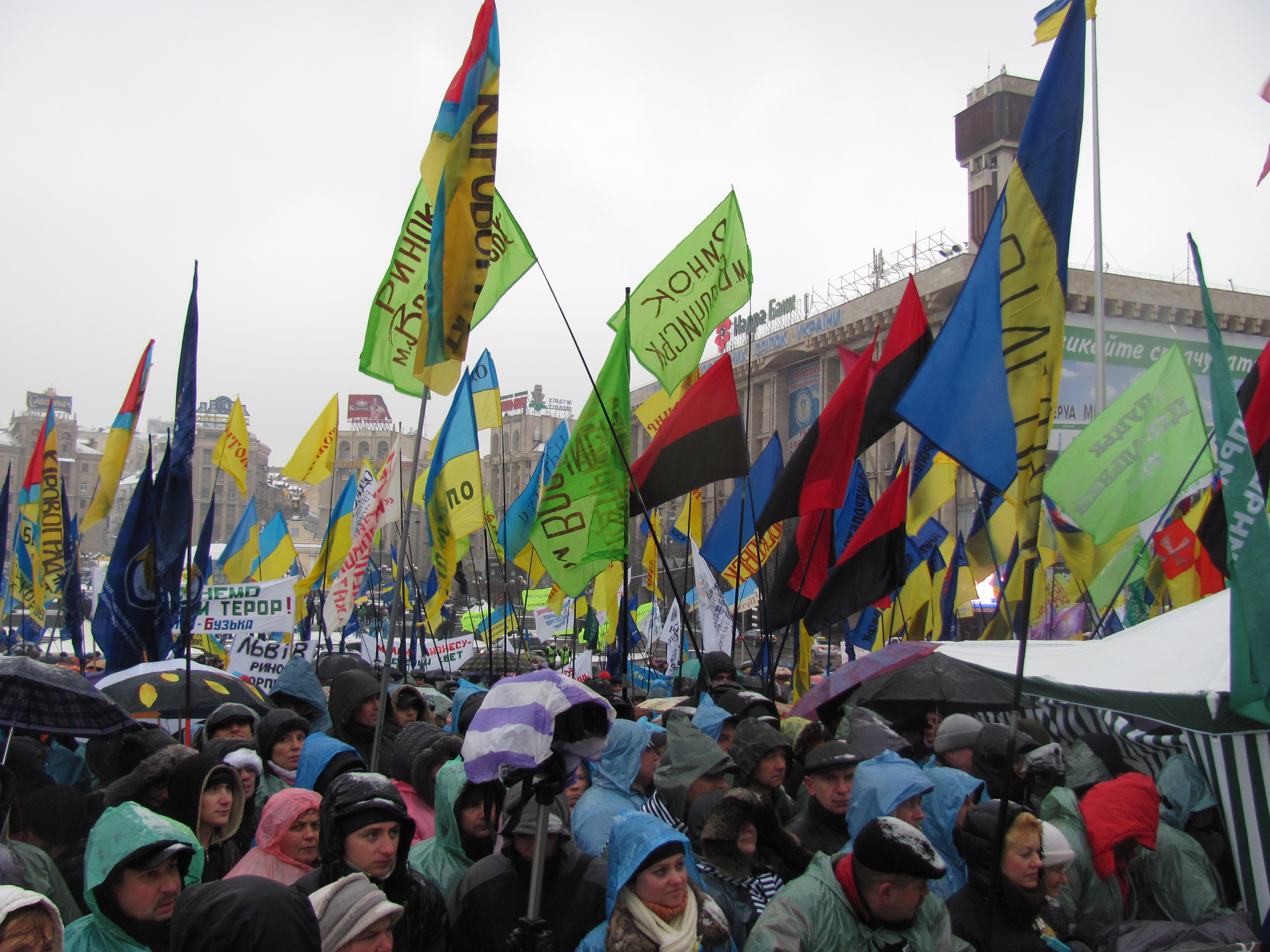
The Tax Maidan (Kyiv). 29 November 2010

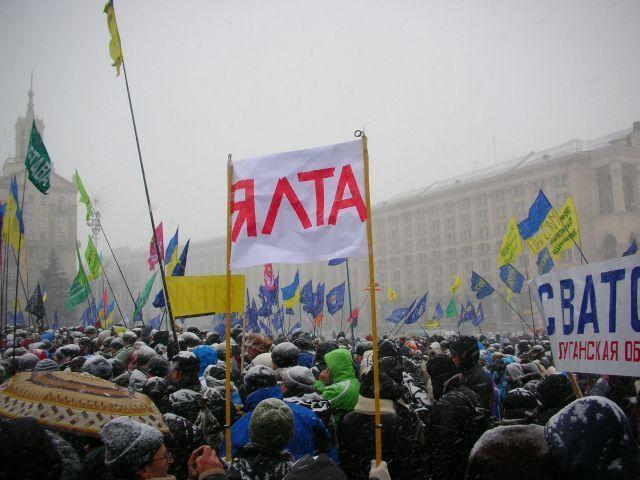
The Tax Maidan (Kyiv). 2 December 2010

In the autumn 2010, Ukraine saw the wave of mass protests from the entrepreneurs of small-size and medium-size businesses; they protested against a number of steps by Yanukovich officials towards cuts in «social standards» through a number of oligarch reforms :

- The new «Pension Code» and «Labour Code» tended to essentially deteriorate the lives of ordinary people.
- The new «Tax Code» significantly (several times more) increased taxes for «small business» («the smallest business» that was under a simplified tax system before, suffered mostly); The medium-size business also suffered losses. Natural persons were not permitted (at the cost of surcharge introduction) to execute work for legal persons; besides, the Code allowed to carry out «inspection of an entrepreneur's living place by Tax Inspection without any sanction by the Procurator's Office».

The Tax Maidan became the culmination point in the protest movement (the All-Ukrainian rallies of small and medium-size entrepreneurs against «the Azarov-Tigipko Tax Code» took place on 22 November 2010 — 3 December 2010). Maidan-2010 achieved that «the heaviest tax provisions of the Azarov-Tigipko Tax Code» were abolished. Those protests of «small and medium businesses» were supported by, almost exclusively, Tymoshenko's BYuT (on 22 November 2010 Tymoshenko made a program speech at the Maidan in Kyiv).

=== Repressions against Tax Maidan−2010, activists arrests ===
On 27 November 2010, President Yanukovich and Prime Minister Azarov came up to the tents of protesters. They promised business people «to hear all their requests and intentions». Really, a part of the most odious provisions of the Tax Code was removed in the new edition of the Code of 29 November 2010, Nevertheless:

- On 3 December 2010, at 5:00 am, the Maidan was surrounded by four rows of «special police». Policemen demolished the tents of the Tax Maidan activists.
- On 28 December 2010, the three activists of the Tax Maidan : Garkavenko I., Zaplatkin O., and Gruzyniv V. were arrested; the fourth detained (co-organiser of the action O. Mandich) was soon released. As for January, the 14th, the criminal cases were launched against seven activists of the Tax Maidan, among them being entrepreneurs : Okhtyrsky, Mandich, Kavenko, Gruzynov, Zaplatkin, Melnichenko, Fedchuk. They were incriminated with «the damage of the tiled cover at the Independence Maidan to the money amount of 230, 000 grn (21,000 euros)».
- In December 2010 detained was, also, an activist of the Tax Maidan Sergey Kostak (as for July 2010, he was kept in the SIZO (a detention centre)).

Therefore, «peaceful protests against the Tax Code» (which had been afterwards considerably changed and amended due to the agreement with the President and Prime-Minister) resulted in detentions eight people were being kept, without a trial, at the detention centre for more than 7 months and released only in July 2011. Leader of the Tax Maidan-2010 Olexander Danilyuk and his «organization of small business undertakers Spilna Sprava (Common Cause)» have joined the protest actions against the trials on Tymoshenko and her associates.

== Collaboration of President Yanukovich with the part of the opposition who do not recognize Tymoshenko as a leader ==
Yet, there exists a part of the opposition who do not consider Tymoshenko as their leader and, hence, can not be seen as «Tymoshenko associates», though they are also a certain subdivision of oppositionists.

=== V. Yushchenko's political team ===
After Victor Yanukovich had taken office (February 2010), persecutions were carried out almost exclusively against the political team of Yulia Tymoshenko as well as the ministers of her Cabinet. Victor Yanukovich collaborates with part of the opposition — Victor Yushchenko's closest associates have been offered top positions:

- Viktor Baloha — minister for emergency (2010–2012) (his brother Ivan Baloga was head of the Trans-Carpathian region in 2010).
- Petro Poroshenko — head of the Supervisory Council at the National Bank (2007–2012), later on, he was appointed minister for economic development and trade of Ukraine (2012) in Azarov's Cabinet.
- Roman Bezsmertnyi — ambassador in Belarus (2010).
- Eugen Chervonenko — head of the department for aviation in the Ministry for Emergency.
- Vladislav Kaskiv (who was a leader of the organization «Pora» until October 2006) — head of the State agency for investments and management of national projects.
- Marina Stavniychuk (a member of the Venice commission) — for some time (2010), a deputy head at President's Administration.
- Yuriy Pavlenko (a minister under Yushchenko) was appointed a Representative of Ukrainian President for children's rights just on the days of his witnessing at the Tymoshenko's trial.

=== Other political opposition forces ===
Also, prosecution processes did not touch the leaders and political groups of the «non-united opposition» (non-united opposition oppose themselves both to Yanukovich and Tymoshenko): ex-speaker Arseniy Yatsenyuk, Sergiy Tigipko, Anatoliy Hrytsenko, Oleh Tyahnybok.

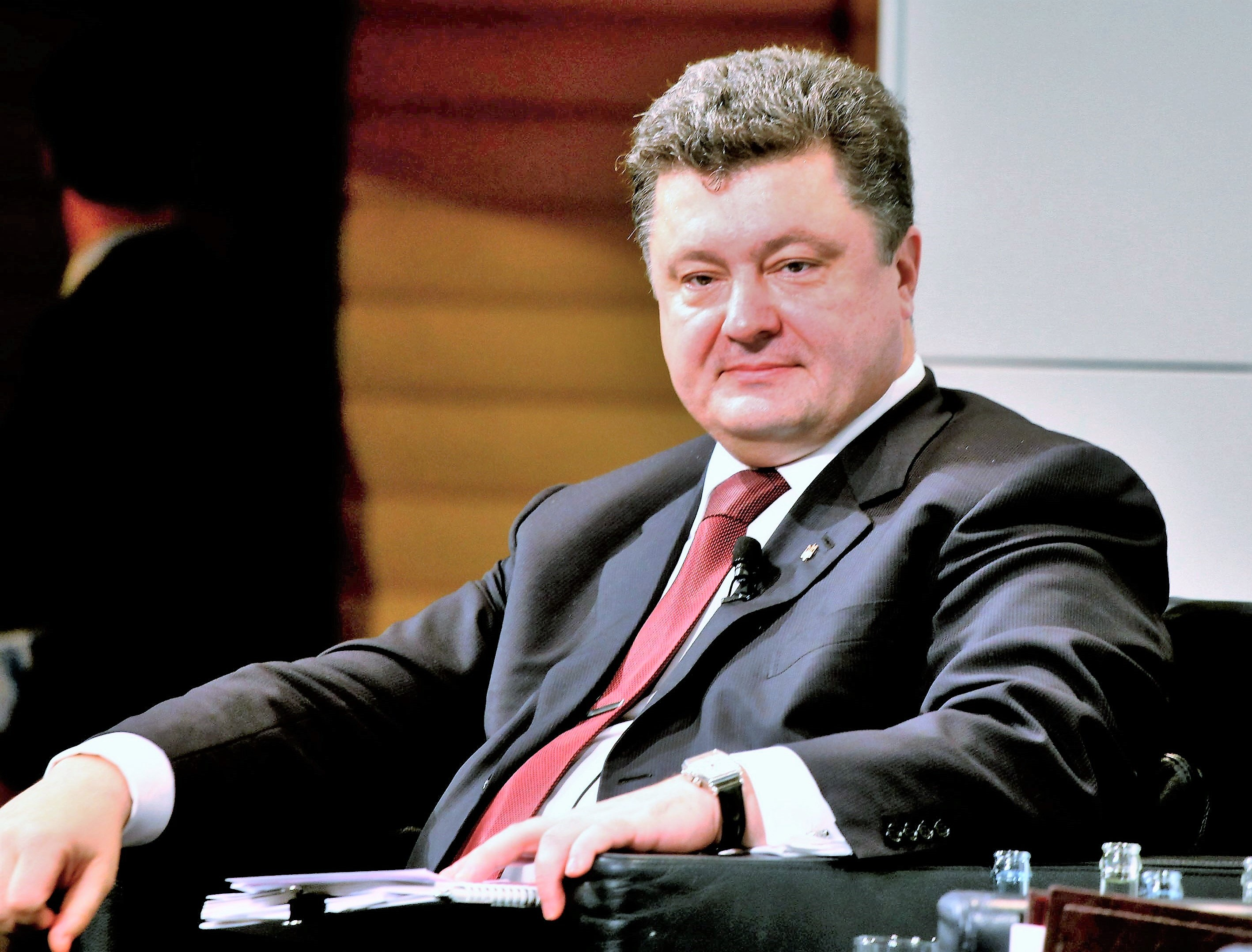
Petro Poroshenko, head of the Supervisory Council of the Ukrainian National Bank in 22.2.2007-26.4.2012, minister in 2012

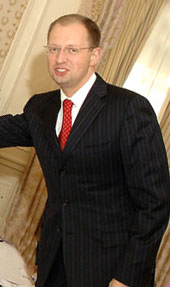
Arseniy Yatsenyuk, ex-speaker, foreign minister in Yanukovish's government in 2006

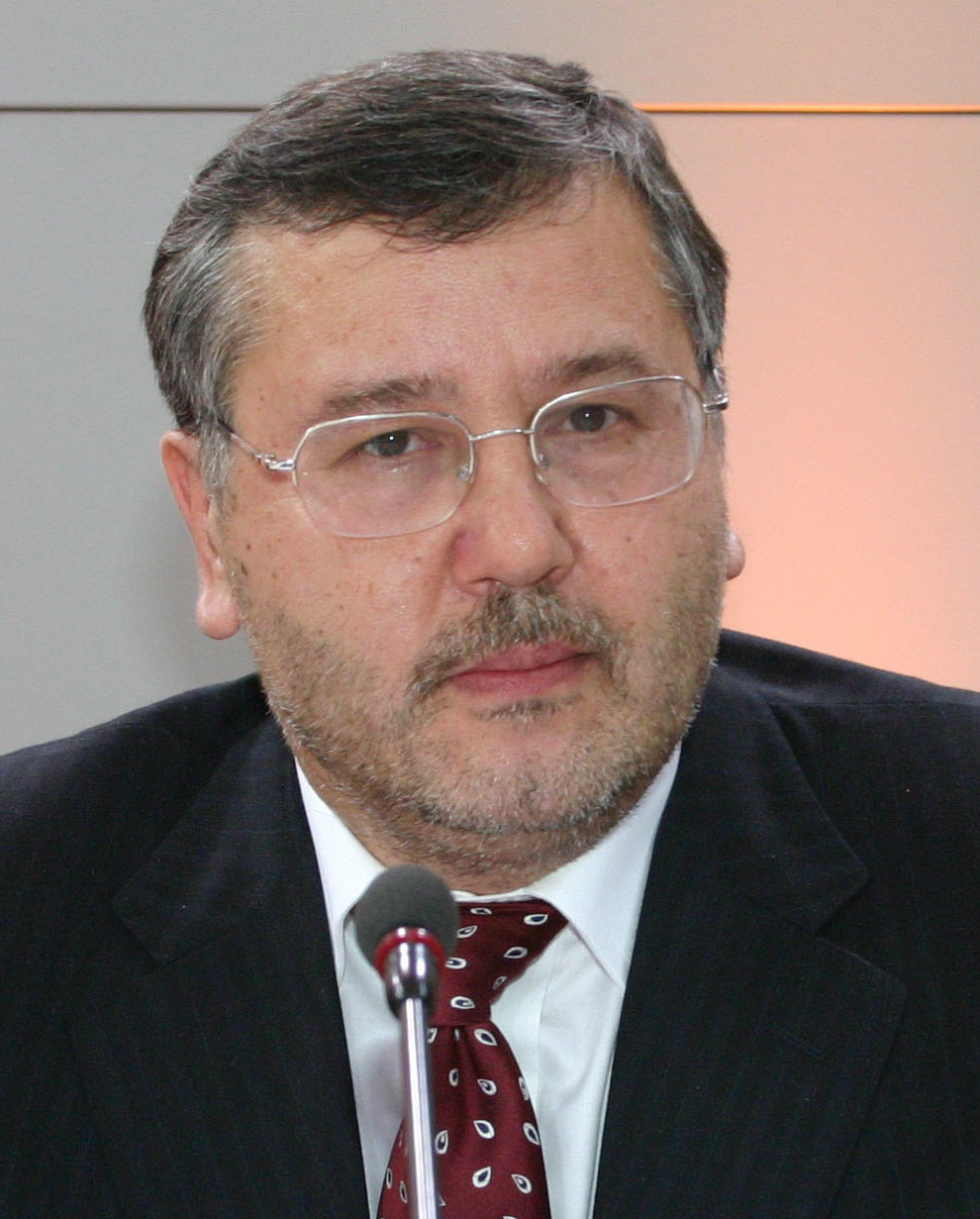
Anatoliy Hrytsenko, minister for defense in Yanukovich's government in 2006

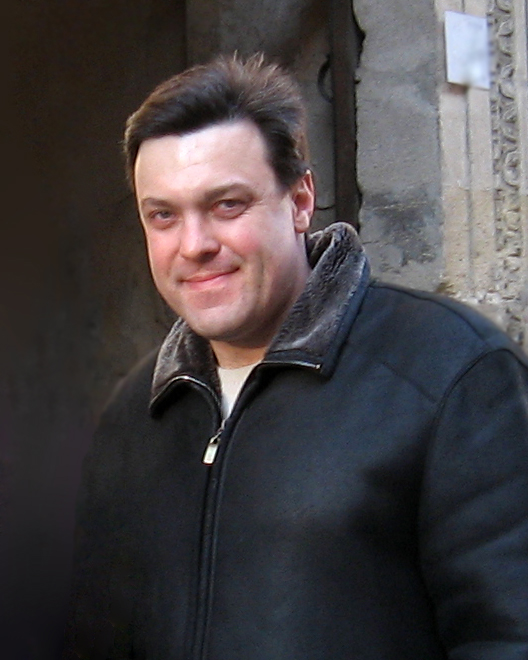
Oleg Tyagnibok, Ukrainian nationalist. January, 2008

There are the examples of Yanukovich collaboration even with former BYuT politicians, but only with those who have completely torn off their ties with BYuT. Two of them have significant positions in government:

- Olexandr Feldman (No. 43 in the BYuT passing lists at the election-2007, ex-head of the BYuT branch in the Kharkiv region, an owner of the biggest market place in Kharkiv) — 25 June 2010 was expelled from BYuT-Batkivshchyna, yet he refused to give back his deputy mandate from BYuT; on 16 March 2011 he joined the Party of Regions. On 8 July 2011 he was elected a member of the political council of the Party of Regions.
- Andrey Portnov (No. 58 in the BYuT passing lists at the election-2007, a known lawyer of the PrivatBank group (headed a team of Tymoshenko's lawyers at the trial following presidential election-2010). On 2 April 2010 he was appointed a deputy head of the Presidential administration (PA head had 9 deputy heads). That same time, he was expelled from BYuT-Batkivshchyna; on 16 April 2010 he gave his BYuT deputy mandate back, on 5 April 2011 he was dismissed as deputy head of presidential administration.

Both Feldman and Portnov were, in the past, the deputies of «certain significance» for BYuT, but not at all the close associates of Tymoshenko (No. 43 and No. 58, respectively, in the BYuT lists). As a total, during 2010–2012 years, the BYuT faction expelled (basically, for voting against faction decisions) more than a third of deputies — out of 156, remained «slightly more than 100 deputies» (October 2012).

== See also ==
- «The Instrumentalisation of the judiciary in Ukraine: authoritarian excesses of one man or an approach to political development?» Foundation Robert Shuman. 23 July 2012.
- Courtroom Drama. Valentyna Telychenko: «Dependent courts are a bigger problem for Ukraine than the imperfect Criminal Code». Site «The Ukrainian Week», 27 January 2012.
- «The Party of Regions monopolises power in Ukraine». OSW Commentary. 29 September 2010.
- «From stabilisation to stagnation. Viktor Yanukovych's reforms». 12 March 2013.

Political repression in Ukraine. Ukrainian Helsinki Committee

- «Report on Political Persecution in Ukraine in 2011». Ukrainian Helsinki Human Rights Union. Site «helsinki.org.ua», 21 November 2011.
- Some thoughts regarding criminal cases against Tax Code Protesters (in «Political Persecution in modern Ukraine 2010–2011»). Yevhen Zakharov. Ukrainian Helsinki Human Rights Union. 18 January 2011.

Six resolutions of the European Parliament (2010–2012 year) on the issue of repression against Tymoshenko and her associates:

- European Parliament resolution of 25 February 2010 on the situation in Ukraine. Thursday, 25 February 2010 — Brussels.
- European Parliament resolution of 9 June 2011 on Ukraine: the cases of Yulia Tymoshenko and other members of the former government. Thursday, 9 June 2011 — Strasbourg.
- European Parliament resolution of 27 October 2011 on the current developments in Ukraine. Thursday, 27 October 2011 — Strasbourg.
- European Parliament resolution of 1 December 2011 containing the European Parliament's recommendations to the Council, the Commission and the EEAS on the negotiations of the EU-Ukraine Association Agreement (2011/2132(INI)). Thursday, 1 December 2011 — Brussels.
- European Parliament resolution of 24 May 2012 on Ukraine (2012/2658(RSP)). Thursday, 24 May 2012 — Strasbourg.
- European Parliament resolution of 13 December 2012 on the situation in Ukraine 2012/2889(RSP)). Thursday, 13 December 2012 — Strasbourg.

== Multimedia materials ==
- 2011 — Canada, «Debate on Democracy in Ukraine», House of Commons, Ottawa. 18 October 2011..
- 2011 — EU concerned by Tymoshenko appeal failure. 29 August 2012.
- 2011 — Interview with Eugenia Tymoshenko at the EPP Congress in Marseille, France. 16 December 2011.
- 2010 — Speech of the repressed leader of Ukrainian opposition Yulia Tymoshenko. 6 August 2011.; 5,000 police officers block the center of Kyiv. 11 October 2011.
- 2011 — (Ukrainian language) General Makarenko and Taras Shepitko released from detention (after a year of being in SIZO without trial) 5 July 2011.
- 2012 — Bohdan Danylyschyn. Czech Republic: The Fate of the Tymoshenkos. European Journal. 6 April 2012.
- 2011 — Vitali Klitschko about Yulia Tymoshenko. 11 October 2011.
- 2012 — In Kyiv Madonna asks about Tymoshenko (Madonna asks the crowd if they are upset that Yulia Tymoshenko is in jail, but why they are not protesting to get her released?). 4 August 2012.

=== Yanukovych and Azarov answer the question of political repressions in Ukraine ===
- 2011 — Euronews interview : Ukraine's president Yanukovych defends Tymoshenko trial. 31 October 2011.
- 2012 — Euronews interview : No dictatorship in Ukraine — says prime-minister Azarov. 12 May 2012.
