= Karol Zyndram Maszkowski =

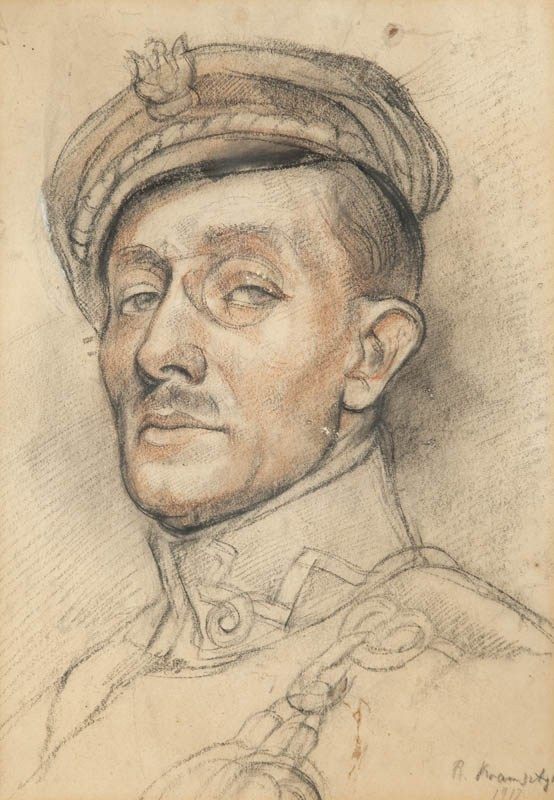
Karol Maszkowski as a Lieutenant (1917); portrait by Roman Kramsztyk

Karol Antoni Maszkowski, later known as Karol Zyndram Maszkowski (26 May 1868, Lwów - 24 March 1938, Warsaw) was a Polish painter, poster designer, and stained glass artist.

== Biography ==
His father Karol Maszkowski, was a mathematician who lectured and served as a Rector at Lwów Polytechnic. His mother, Marica, née Ferrero, was from Italy. In 1886, after his father's death, he moved to Kraków, where he studied medicine at the Jagiellonian University. After a year, he also began to study painting at the School of Fine Arts.

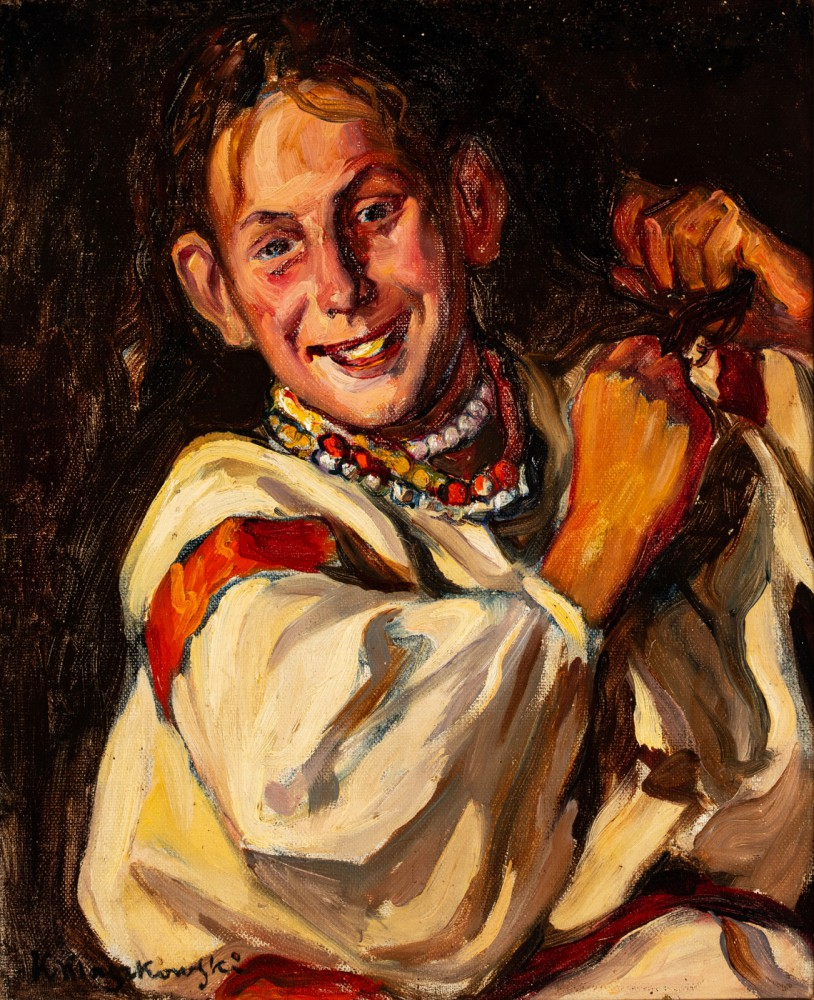
Laughing Hutsul Girl

After graduating, he travelled; to Vienna, Venice and Munich, where he took lessons from Ludwig von Löfftz. He also spent some time studying decorative painting at the Gwoździec Synagogue. When he returned to Kraków, he was an assistant to Jan Matejko at St. Mary's Basilica. In 1892, he submitted a doctoral dissertation, on a subject he had been assigned three years earlier, but chose not to take the exam; having decided to pursue a career in art, rather than medicine. He then moved to Paris, where he polished his skills at the École Nationale Supérieure des Beaux-Arts with Jean-Léon Gérôme, followed by some time at the Académie Julian.

In 1898, he returned to Kraków. The following year, he was commissioned by the Polish Academy of Arts and Sciences to create drawings of the art work at the Gwoździec Synagogue. In 2014, those drawings would be used to reconstruct part of the synagogue at the POLIN Museum of the History of Polish Jews. In 1902, he retired to the Huculszczyzna region, to focus on his painting. He came out of seclusion in 1911, to begin teaching drawing classes, in the evening, at the School of Fine Arts. He also became Manager of the furniture collection at the Museum of Science and Industry. His memberships included those in the gymnastic society Sokół, and the local Riflemen's Association.

In 1914, he joined the rifle unit of the Polish Legion, and donated his manor house in Zembrzyce for the convalescence of wounded soldiers. It was during this time that he adopted "Zyndram" (raven) as his middle name. He initially fought under the command of Captain Zbigniew Dunin-Wasowicz, then worked at staff headquarters for the Polish Legion. In 1915, he was transferred to the command of then Lieutenant-Colonel, Edward Rydz-Śmigły; participating in the battles of Jastków, Kostiuchnówka, and several others. In 1916, he fell ill with typhus. Although he recovered, this ended his active participation in the war so, in 1917, he returned to Kraków and became involved in organizing the military museum. He was promoted to captain in 1918, worked in the propaganda department of the 2nd Rifle Division, and lectured at the Military Geographical Institute. He served until 1922, when he was transferred to the reserves.

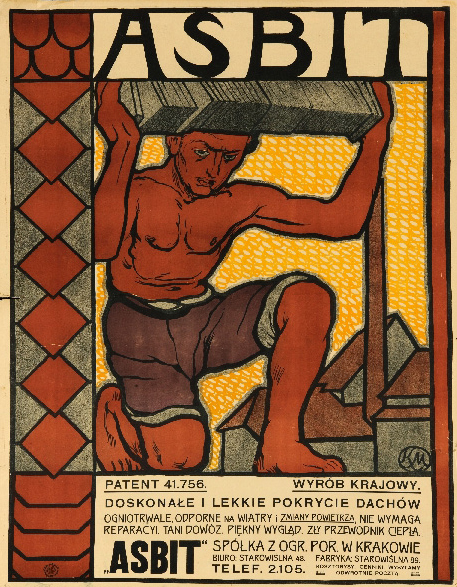
Poster for "Asbit", a roofing company

In 1925, he moved to Poznań where, for thirteen years, he was Director of the University of the Arts. In 1933, he was named a Knight in the Order of Polonia Restituta. He resigned in 1938, due to health problems. He died suddenly while visiting his family in Warsaw. He was interred at the Powązki Military Cemetery.
