= Barbara Kirshenblatt-Gimblett =

American academic

Barbara Kirshenblatt-Gimblett (born September 30, 1942, in Toronto, Ontario) is a scholar of Performance and Jewish Studies and a museum professional. Professor Emerita of Performance Studies at New York University, she is best known for her interdisciplinary contributions to Jewish studies and to the theory and history of museums, tourism, and heritage. She is currently the Ronald S. Lauder Chief Curator of the Core Exhibition and Advisor to the Director at POLIN Museum of the History of Polish Jews in Warsaw.

== Biography ==
Barbara Kirshenblatt-Gimblett was born in Toronto, Ontario, during the Second World War, and raised in Toronto's downtown immigrant neighborhood during the immediate postwar years. Both of her parents were Jewish and were born and raised in Poland. Her mother came to Canada from Brześć nad Bugiem in 1929 and her father from Opatów in 1934. She attended Orde Street Public School and Northview Heights Collegiate, as well as the Farband Shule, Peretz Shule, and D'Arcy Talmud Torah. At Northview Heights she took the leading role in George Bernard Shaw's Saint Joan, which was showcased at the Sears Drama Festival. She lived in Israel during 1961-1962 and studied at an ulpan, worked on Kibbutz Revivim, taught manual training to boys with learning disabilities in Tel Aviv, and conducted research on textiles in Jerusalem. Upon her return to Toronto, she began her university studies and academic career. She married the artist Max Gimblett in 1964. They have lived and worked in the United States since 1965.

== Academic career ==
An honors English major at the University of Toronto from 1962 to 1965, Kirshenblatt-Gimblett graduated from the University of California, Berkeley, with an A.B. and M.A. in English literature in 1966 and 1967 respectively. She received her PhD in 1972 from Indiana University Bloomington, where she studied folklore, anthropology, ethnomusicology, sociolinguistics, and material culture under folklorist Richard Dorson.

She has held faculty appointments at the University of Texas at Austin (English Literature and Anthropology), Columbia University (Linguistics and Yiddish Studies), University of Pennsylvania (Folklore and Folklife), and New York University (Performance Studies) since 1981. She is Professor Emerita of Performance Studies and distinguished University Professor Emerita (an honor conferred in 2002) at the Tisch School of the Arts, New York University, where she chaired her department for more than a decade. She was also Affiliated Professor of Hebrew and Judaic Studies in the Graduate School of Arts and Science. From 2000 to 2001, she held a fellowship at the Katz Center for Advanced Judaic Studies.

== Advisory boards and roles ==
Kirshenblatt-Gimblett served as President of the American Folklore Society from 1988 to 1992 and as the AFS delegate to the American Council of Learned Societies. She has been on boards and advisory committees for the following institutions: Getty Institute for the History of Art and the Humanities; Center for Folklife Programs and Cultural Studies, Smithsonian Institution; Stanford Humanities Center; Association for Museum History; the Schlesinger Library on the History of Women in America, Radcliffe College; Association for Jewish Studies Executive Board and AJS Women's Caucus; the American Center for Wine, Food, and the Arts; Social Science Research Council; and International Center for Advanced Studies, New York University. She was admitted, by invitation, to the American Academy for Jewish Research and the Society of American Historians. She is on the Academic Advisory Council of the YIVO Institute for Jewish Research.

== Museums ==
Kirshenblatt-Gimblett has worked as a consultant for many museums, exhibition projects, and cultural festivals. These include ANU: Museum of the Jewish People (Tel Aviv), Jewish Museum Berlin, the United States Holocaust Memorial Museum (Washington, D.C.), Yeshiva University Museum (New York), The Jewish Museum (New York), Skirball Museum (Los Angeles), Weitzman National Museum of American Jewish History (Philadelphia), Spertus Institute for Jewish Learning and Leadership (Chicago), Smithsonian Institution (Washington, D.C.), National September 11 Memorial & Museum (New York), Museum of Jurassic Technology (Los Angeles), and the Los Angeles Festival.

She has been on the advisory boards for the Jewish Museum Vienna, Jewish Museum Berlin and the Jewish Museum and Tolerance Center (Moscow). She is an advisor for The Lost Shtetl Museum (Šeduva, Lithuania), the Belarusian-Jewish Cultural Heritage Center (Minsk), which aims to create a Belarusian Jewish museum, the Armenian Jewish Museum (Vlora) and Besa Museum (Tirana), and the Foodish program at ANU – Museum of the Jewish People (Tel Aviv).

She has curated exhibitions for the YIVO Institute for Jewish Research, The Jewish Museum (New York), and the Smithsonian Institution, and published extensively on museums, including in Nowa (2011), and since then in catalogues for the Core Exhibition and temporary exhibition at POLIN Museum of the History of Polish Jews (Warsaw), and in academic journals and books. She is a member of the International Council of Museums, UNESCO's International Council of Museums, Vice-chair of the International Committee of Memorial and Human Rights Museums, a member of the Council of American Jewish Museums, and Association of European Jewish Museums, which has honored her with lifetime membership.

In 2006, after consulting for the Museum of the History of Polish Jews for several years, she agreed to lead the team developing the Core Exhibition, a multimedia narrative experience dedicated to the 1000-year history of Polish Jews.

== Writing ==
They Called Me Mayer July: Painted Memories of a Jewish Childhood in Poland Before the Holocaust, which she coauthored with her father Mayer Kirshenblatt, was accompanied by an exhibition of the paintings and a documentary film, Paint What You Remember. The book won three awards, two of them Canadian Jewish Book Awards, and was a finalist in three categories for the National Jewish Book Award. The film records Mayer Kirshenblatt's return to his hometown, Opatów, with his family and the warm reception he and his memories received from those living there today. The exhibition, which opened at the Magnes Museum (Berkeley, California) in 2007, traveled to The Jewish Museum (New York) and the Jewish Historical Museum (Amsterdam). The audio guide received a 2010 MUSE award from the American Association of Museums in recognition of outstanding achievement in the use of digital media "to enhance the museum experience and engage audiences." A print version of the exhibition was shown in Opatów and at the Galicia Jewish Museum in Kazimierz/Kraków. Awakening Lives: Autobiographies of Jewish Youth in Poland before the Holocaust, to which Kirshenblatt-Gimblett contributed, coincides with the period of Kirshenblatt's youth in Poland.

Kirshenblatt-Gimblett is the author of Destination Culture: Tourism, Museums, and Heritage (University of California Press, 1998). She co-authored The Israel Experience: Studies in Youth Travel and Jewish Identity with Harvey Goldberg and Samuel Heilman (Jerusalem: Studio Kavgraph, Andrea and Charles Bronfman Philanthropies, 2002). Her edited books include Writing Modern Jewish History: Essays in Honor of Salo W. Baron (Yale University Press, 2006), which won a National Jewish Book Award; The Art of Being Jewish in Modern Times (co-edited with Jonathan Karp) (University of Pennsylvania Press, 2007); Museum Frictions: Public Cultures/Global Transformations (co-edited with Ivan Karp and Corinne Kratz et al.) (Duke University Press, 2006); Art from Start to Finish (co-edited with Howard Becker and Robert Faulkner, University of Chicago Press, 2005), They Called Me Mayer July: Painted Memories of a Jewish Childhood in Poland Before the Holocaust(co-authored with Mayer Kirshenblatt, her father) (University of California Press, 2007), and Anne Frank Unbound: Media, Imagination, Memory (co-edited with Jeffrey Shandler) (Indiana University Press, 2012), among others.

Her earlier books include Image before My Eyes: A Photographic History of Jewish Life in Poland, 1864–1939, with Lucjan Dobroszycki (Schocken, reissued 1995), which was accompanied by a landmark exhibition for the YIVO Institute for Jewish Research at The Jewish Museum and feature documentary film (recently reissued on DVD). Her other publications include Speech Play: Research and Resources for Linguistic Creativity (editor and contributor); Fabric of Jewish Life: Textiles from the Jewish Museum Collection (in collaboration with Cissy Grossman); Authoring Lives; and numerous articles.

== Honors ==
She was designated Distinguished Humanist for 2003 by the Melton Center for Jewish Studies at Ohio State University. In 2008, she was honored with the Foundation for Jewish Culture award for lifetime achievement and the Mlotek Prize for Yiddish and Yiddish Culture, and was selected for the Forward 50, which celebrates leadership, creativity, and impact. In 2010 she received the Shofar Award of the 25th Annual Jewish Music Festival and in 2015 she was awarded the Officer's Cross of the Order of Merit of the Republic of Poland from the President of Poland, an honorary doctorate from the Jewish Theological Seminary of America, and the Marshall Sklare award for her contributions to the social scientific study of Jewry. In 2017, she received an honorary doctorate from the University of Haifa and was elected to the American Academy of Arts and Sciences. In 2020 she was honored with the Dan David Prize.

Previous awards include the Guggenheim Fellowship and grants from the American Council of Learned Societies, National Endowment for the Arts, and National Endowment for the Humanities. She was a Getty Scholar at the Getty Center for the History of Art and the Humanities in 1991–1992, in residence at the Rockefeller Foundation's Bellagio Conference and Study Center in 1991, a Phi Beta Kappa Visiting Scholar in 1995, a Winston Fellow at the Institute for Advanced Studies at the Hebrew University in Jerusalem in 1996, a University of Auckland Foundation Visitor in 1998, a fellow at the Swedish Collegium for Advanced Study in the Social Sciences) in Uppsala in the Spring of 1999, and a resident research fellow at the Center for Advanced Judaic Studies at the University of Pennsylvania in 2001.
