= Gwoździec Synagogue =

Former synagogue in Hvizdets, Ukraine

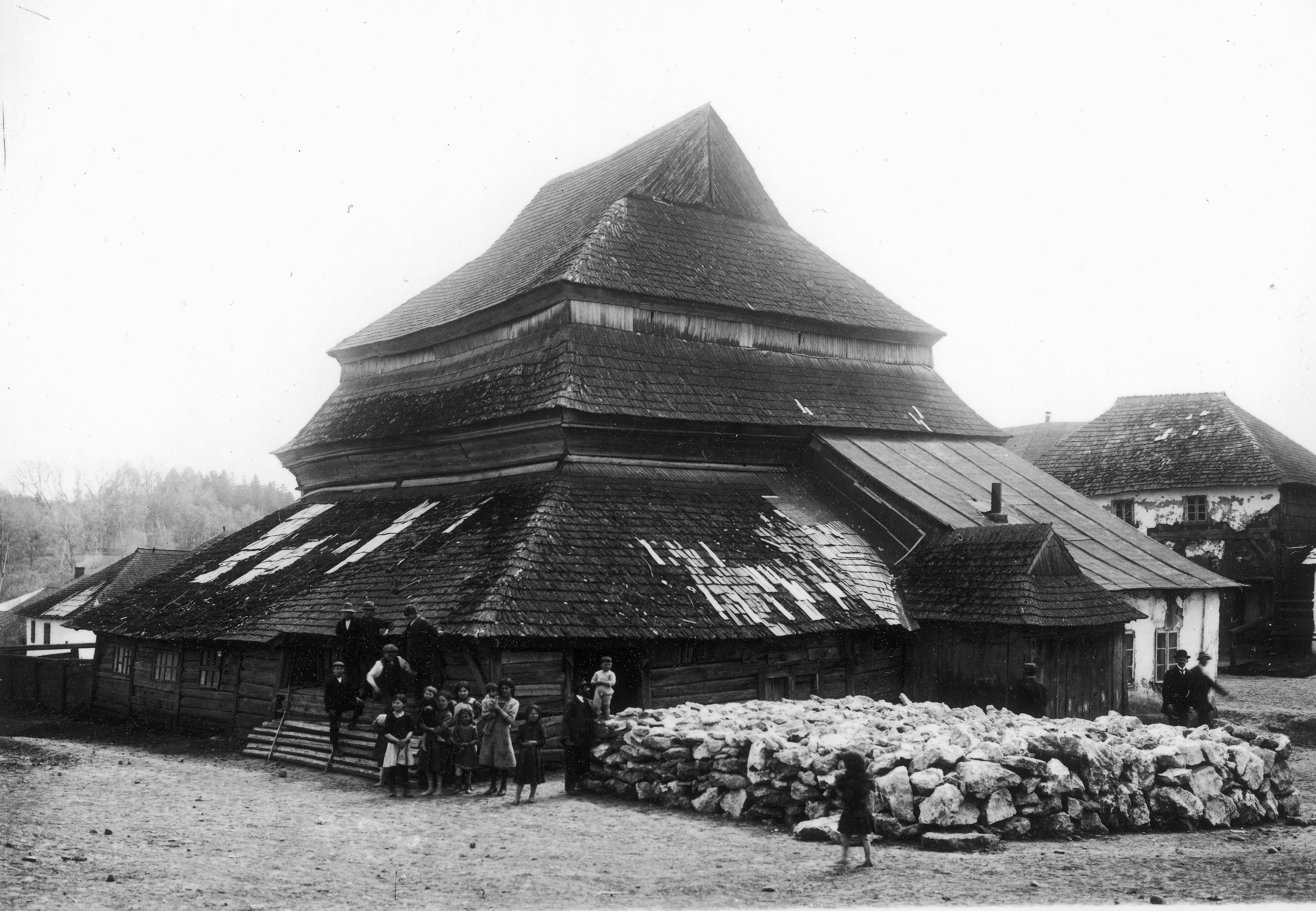
- The former synagogue, taken sometime between 1880 and 1939

- Location of the destroyed synagogue Gwoździec Synagogue (Ukraine)

Religion
- Affiliation: Judaism (former)
- Ecclesiastical or organizational status: Synagogue (1650–1941)
- Status: Destroyed

Location
- Location: Gwoździec, Polish–Lithuanian Commonwealth, (now in Kolomyia Raion)
- Country: Ukraine
- Interactive map of Gwoździec Synagogue
- Coordinates: 48°34′46″N 25°17′1″E

Architecture
- Style: Wooden
- Completed: c. 1650
- Destroyed: 1941; during World War II

Specifications
- Length: 10 metres (33 ft)
- Width: 10 metres (33 ft)
- Height (max): 15 metres (49 ft)
- Materials: Timber

The Gwoździec Synagogue was a Jewish synagogue located in the former Polish–Lithuanian Commonwealth in what is now Hvizdets in Ukraine. Built in the mid-17th century, the synagogue endured severe damage during the First World War, and was destroyed by the Nazis in 1941. The synagogue is notable for its highly elaborate ceiling decorations, which were reconstructed at the POLIN Museum of the History of Polish Jews.

== Description ==
The building, which was about 15 meters high, consisted of a rectangular floor plan with post-and-beam walls, and a stepped hip roof covered with wood shingles. The sanctuary interior was elaborately painted with colorful plants, animals, zodiac signs, and texts.

== History ==
According to inscriptions on the ceiling, the polychromy, dated around 1652, was the work of Israel ben Mordechai from Yarychiv (Jaryczów). Between 1700 and 1731, an octagonal cupola was added to the barrel vault. The polychromy was renewed in 1729 by Isaac ben Yehuda Leib Cohen of Jaryczów and Mordechai Liśnicki of Jaryczów. Additions over time include a vestibule, women's sections, and a brick wing that served as a small synagogue, which could be heated in winter, and as a Cheder. The synagogue was destroyed by fire during World War I, when the Russian front moved through the town. The synagogue was subsequently rebuilt, but was destroyed a second time by Nazi Germany in World War II. The reconstructed timber-frame roof and painted ceiling were installed in the core exhibition of POLIN Museum of the History of Polish Jews, in Warsaw, in 2013.

=== Reconstruction ===
The Association of the Jewish Historical Institute of Poland collaborated with Handshouse Studio, a non-profit educational institution in Massachusetts, on the reconstruction of the painted ceiling and timber-frame roof for the core exhibition of POLIN Museum of the History of Polish Jews. The mission of Handshouse Studio is to create innovative hands-on projects that illuminate history, explore science, and perpetuate the arts by collaboratively recreating lost historic objects as accurately as possible. While it is impossible to recover the original object, in the sense of its original materials, it is possible to recover the knowledge of how to build it by building it using traditional tools, materials, and techniques, which is how the reconstruction was carried out.

It was possible to reconstruct this synagogue because it is the single best documented of the hundreds of wooden synagogues that once stood in the territory of the Polish–Lithuanian Commonwealth. The first to document this synagogue was the Polish painter, Karol Zyndram Maszkowski, who visited Gwoździec in the autumn 1891. His doctoral dissertation, which is dedicated to this synagogue, provides detailed drawings of the architecture and polychromy, as well as descriptions. He made additional drawings in 1898/1889, when he returned to Gwoździec at the request of the Polish Academy of Sciences in Cracow. Isidor Kaufmann (1853-1921), a Jewish painter in Vienna, who spent many months in the region, made a painting in 1897/1898 of part of the interior of the Gwoździec synagogue, one of a very few color studies of the polychromy. The most extensive documentation, 200 architectural drawings and photographs, was made between 1910 and 1913 by Alois Breier (1885-1948) for his doctoral dissertation in architecture at the Technische Universität Wien. Thomas Hubka authored the definitive modern study of this synagogue.

The first 3D virtual model of the synagogue was created by Handshouse Studio and Thomas Hubka, with students at Bowling Green State University in 2006.

The reconstruction was made by a team of about 300 students, volunteers, and experts using traditional tools and processes. The timber-framing, which started from 200 raw logs with the bark still on, was completed in three two-week workshops led by Handshouse Studio in collaboration with the Timber Framers Guild, during the summer of 2011 at the Museum of Folk Architecture, Sanok. The painting workshops took place in the summers of 2011 and 2012 in masonry synagogues in seven cities across Poland: Rzeszów, Kraków, Wrocław, Gdansk, Sejny, Kazimierz Dolny, and Szczebrzeszyn. At the end of the workshops, the structure was taken apart and stored until the autumn of 2013, when the parts were brought to POLIN Museum of the History of Polish Jews, reassembled, hoisted into place within the core exhibition, and suspended from cables. The ceiling and roof, which weigh about 25 tons, are about 85% scale. The central bimah, which was reconstructed in the same way, is 100% scale.

The entire process is the subject of a documentary film, by Trillium Studios, Raise the Roof.

== Gallery ==
Schematic drawings, 1910-1913
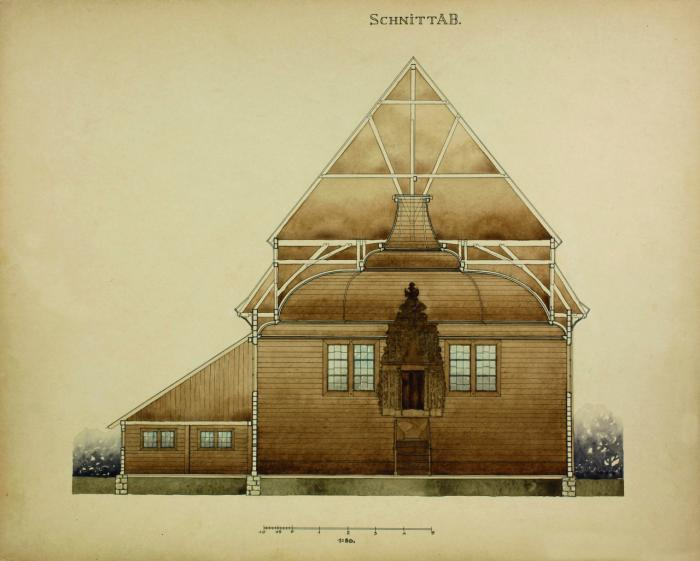

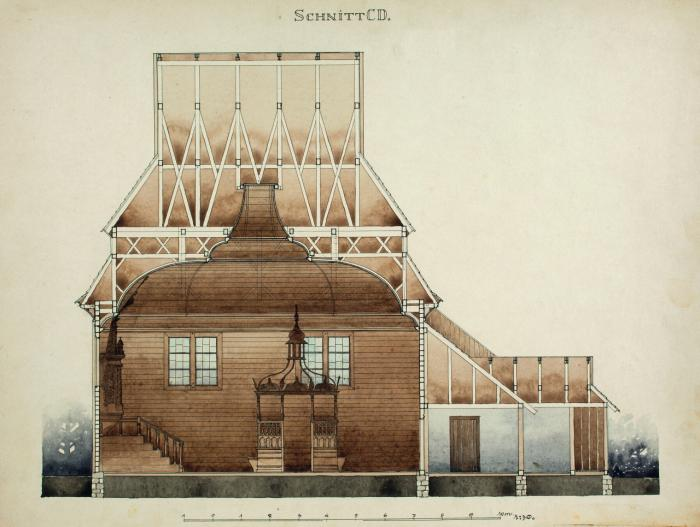

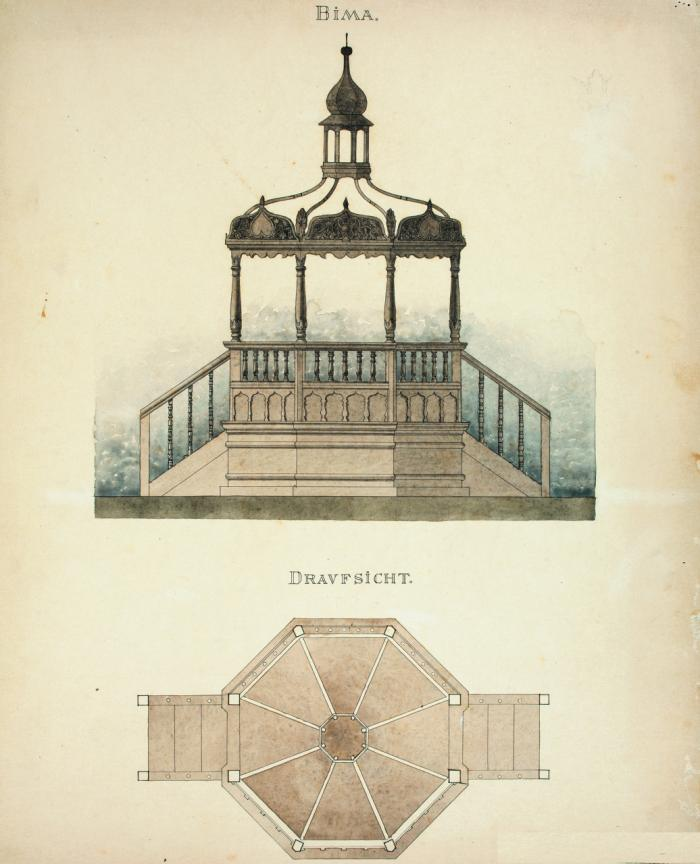

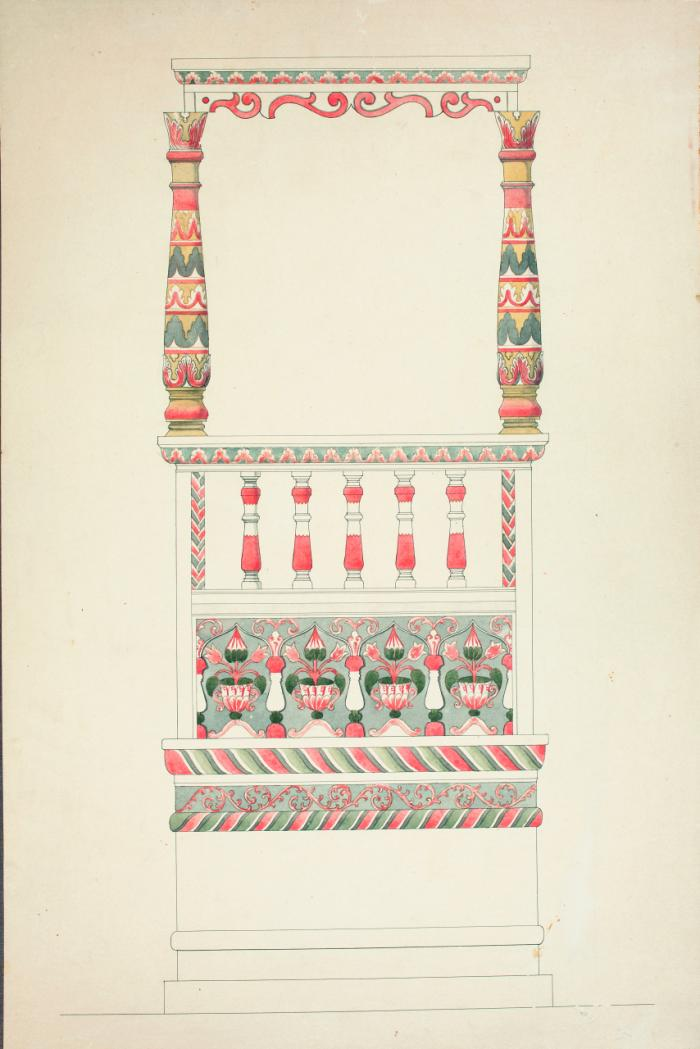

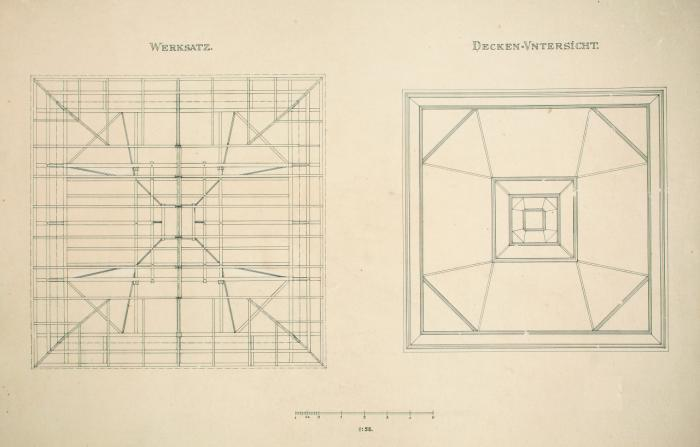
Interior decorations, photos from 1910-1913
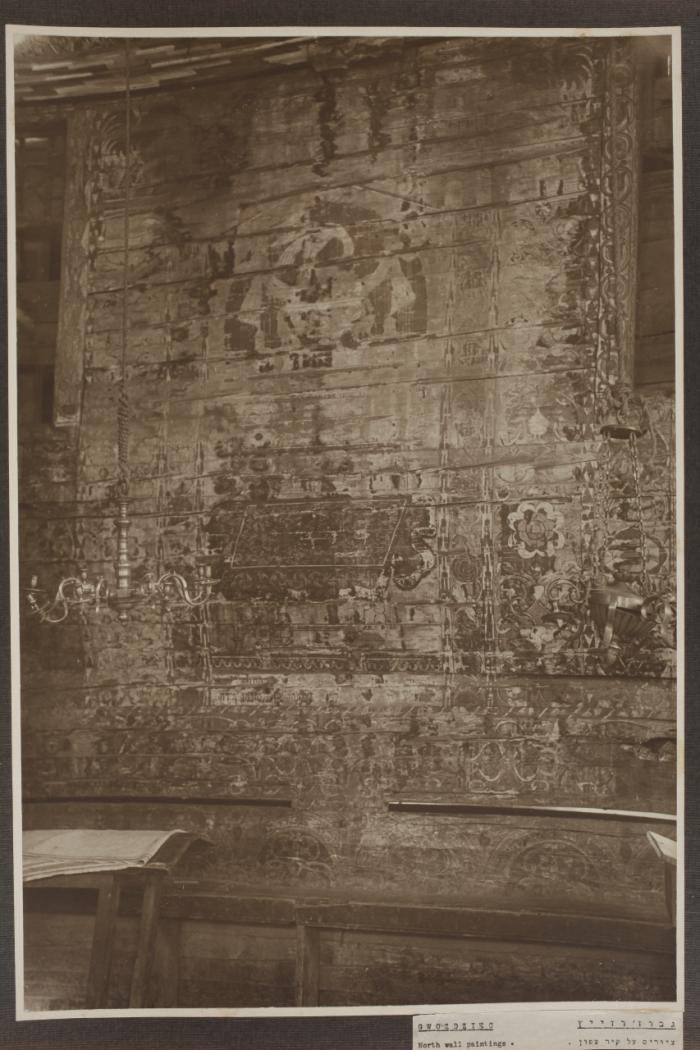

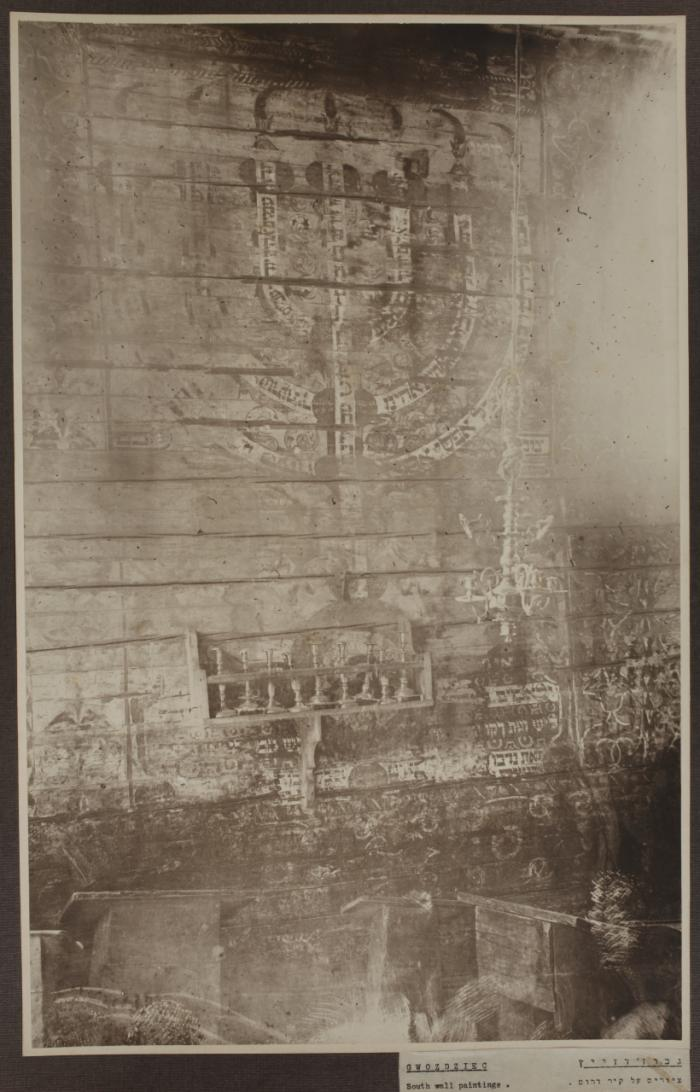

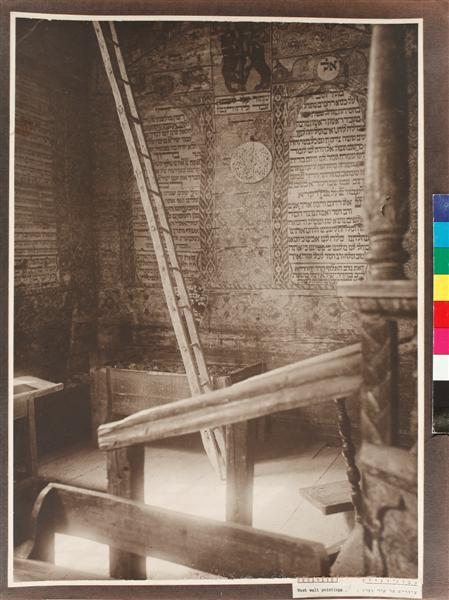

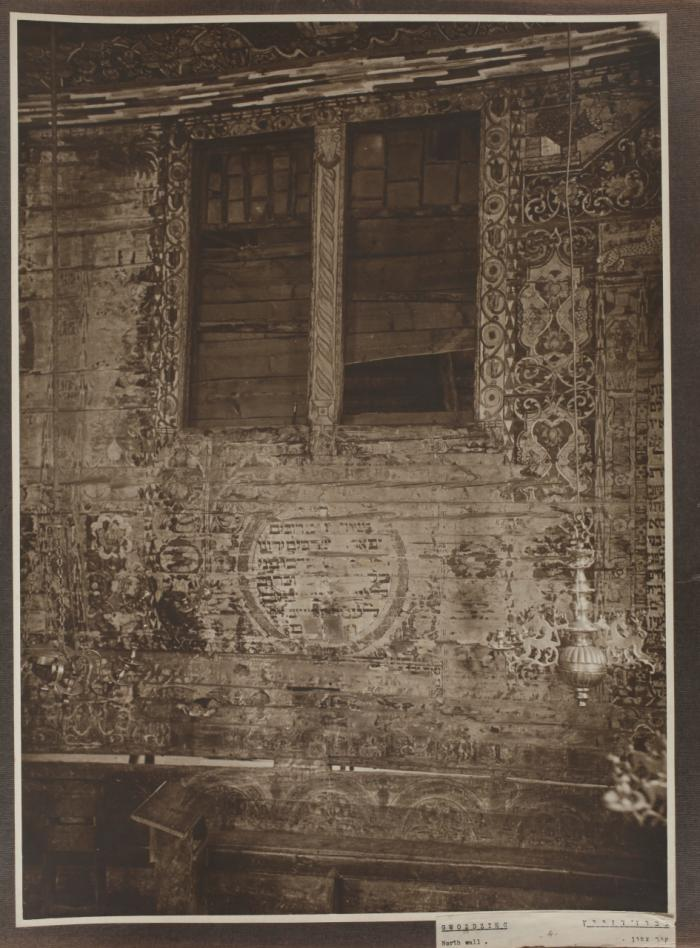

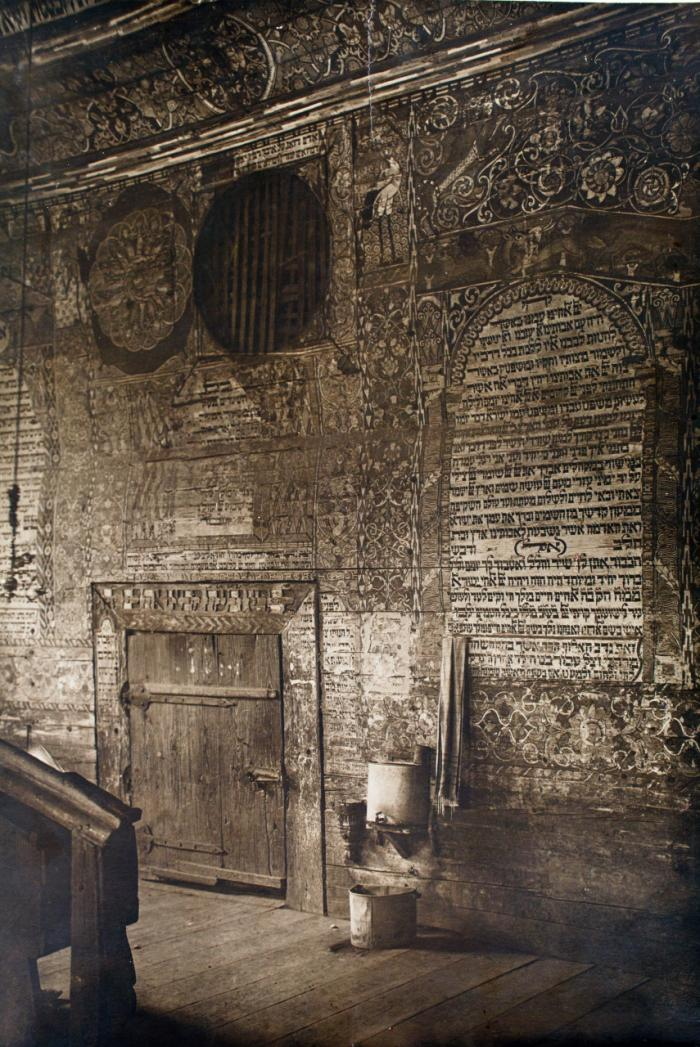

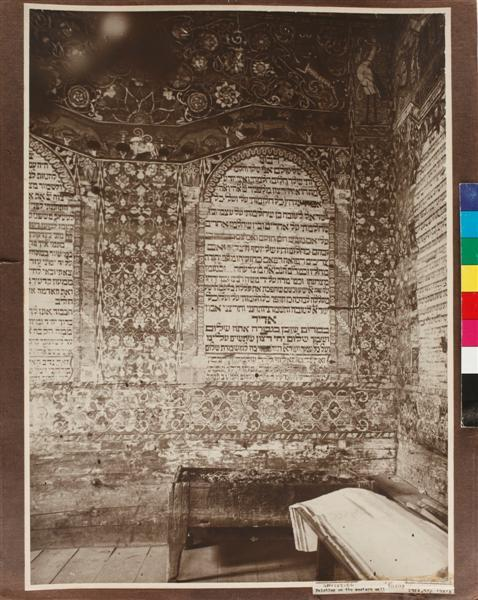

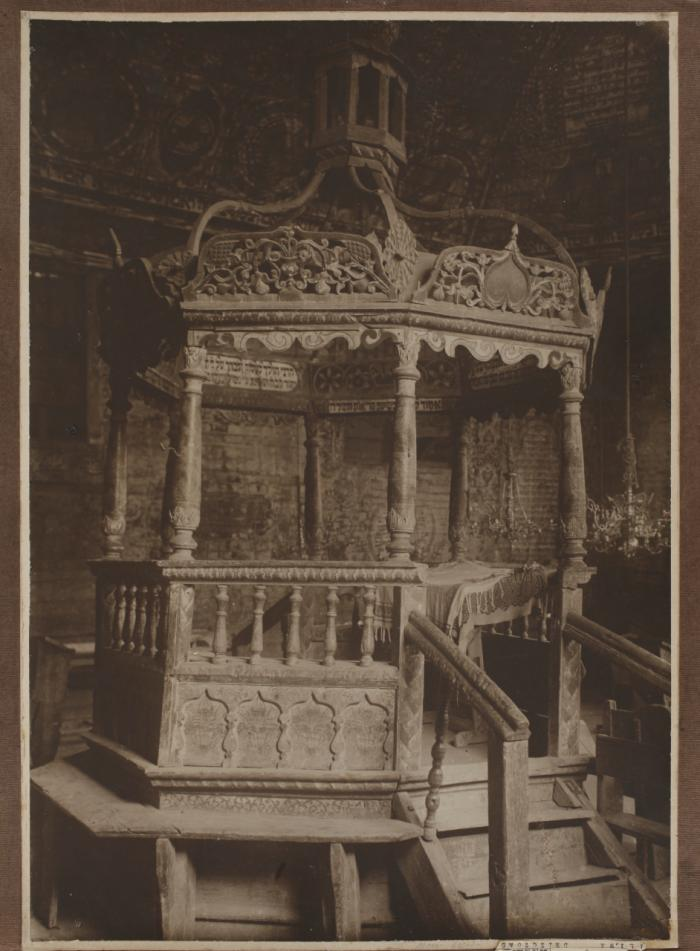
Reconstructed interior and bimah at POLIN Museum of the History of Polish Jews, Warsaw
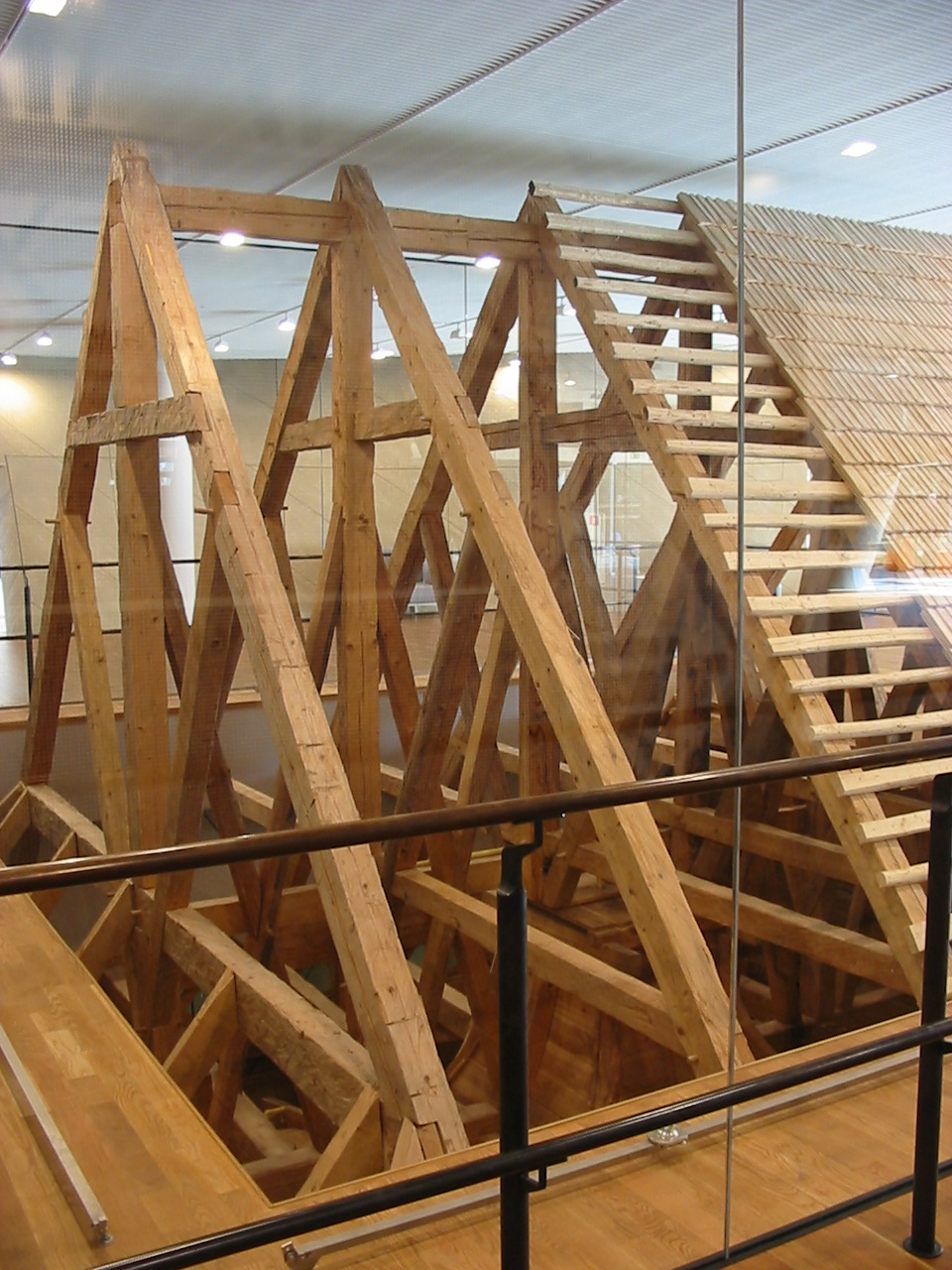

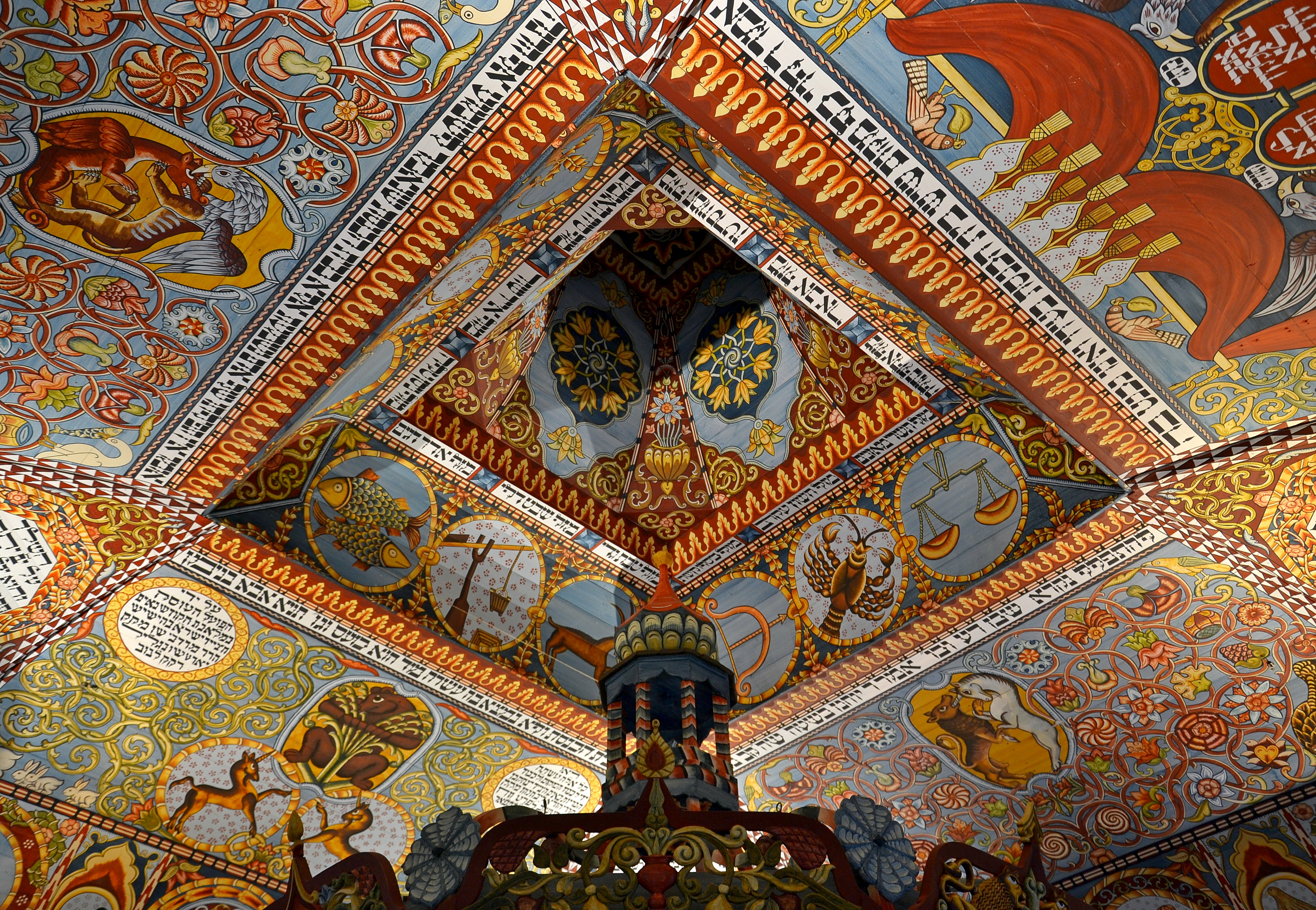

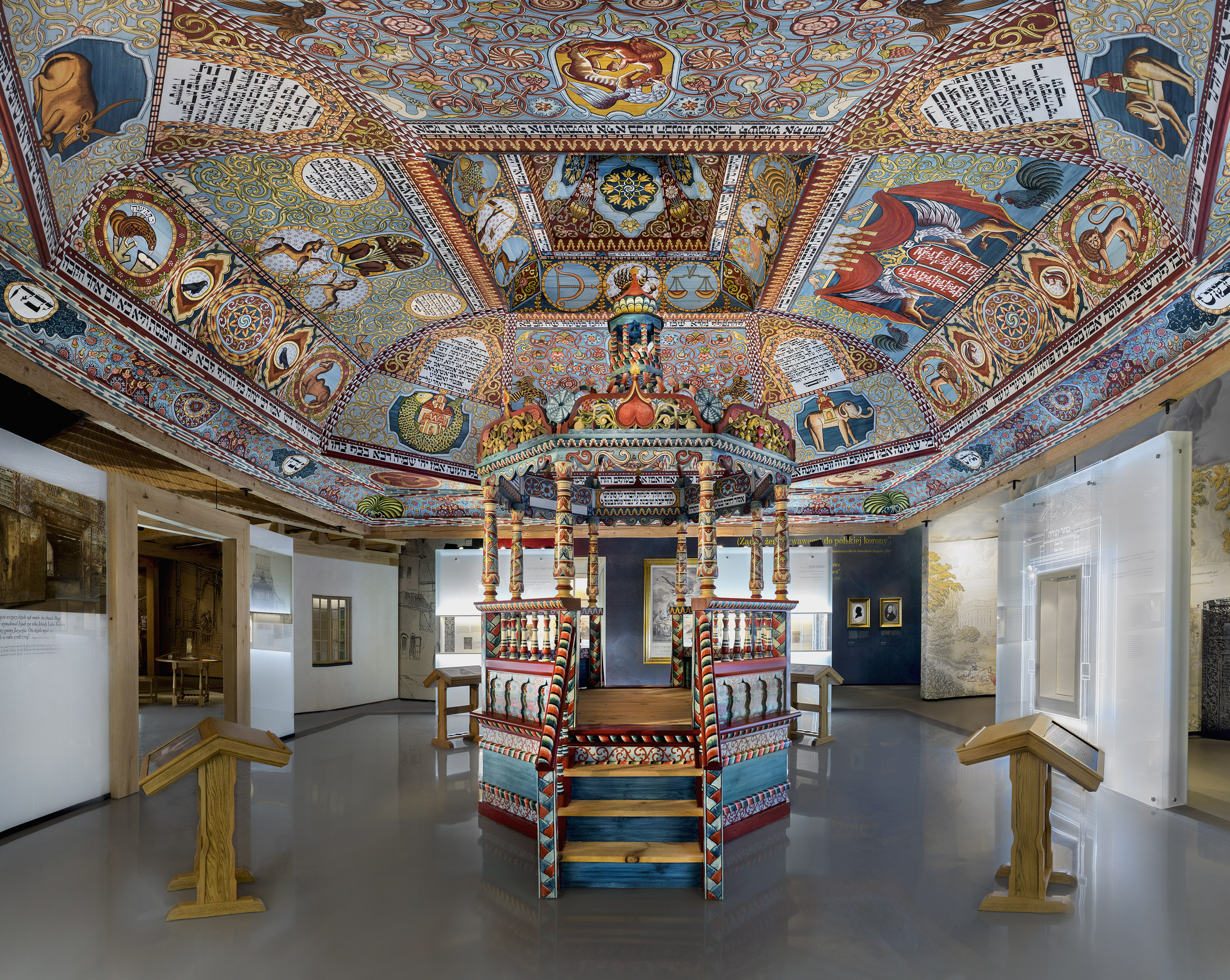

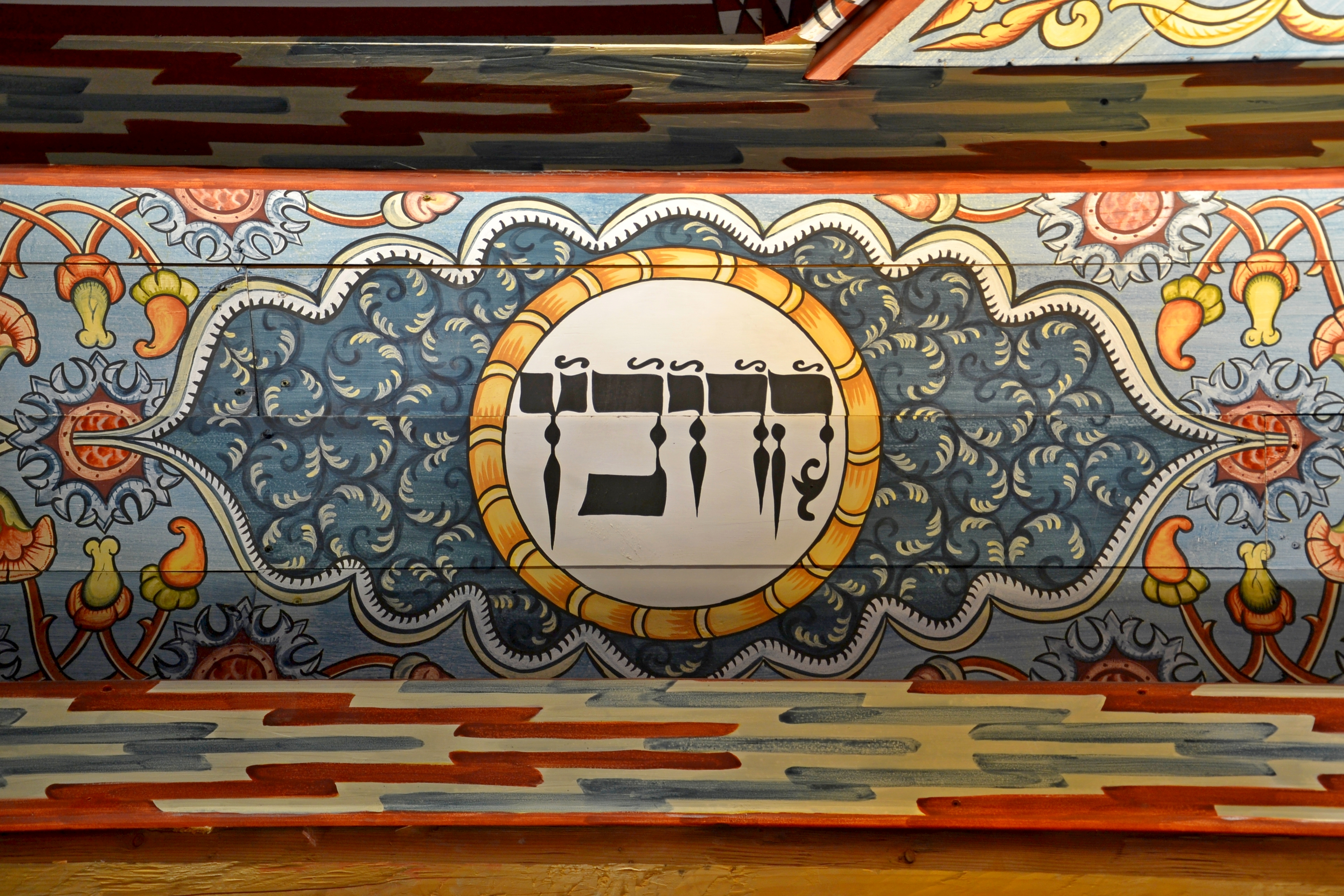

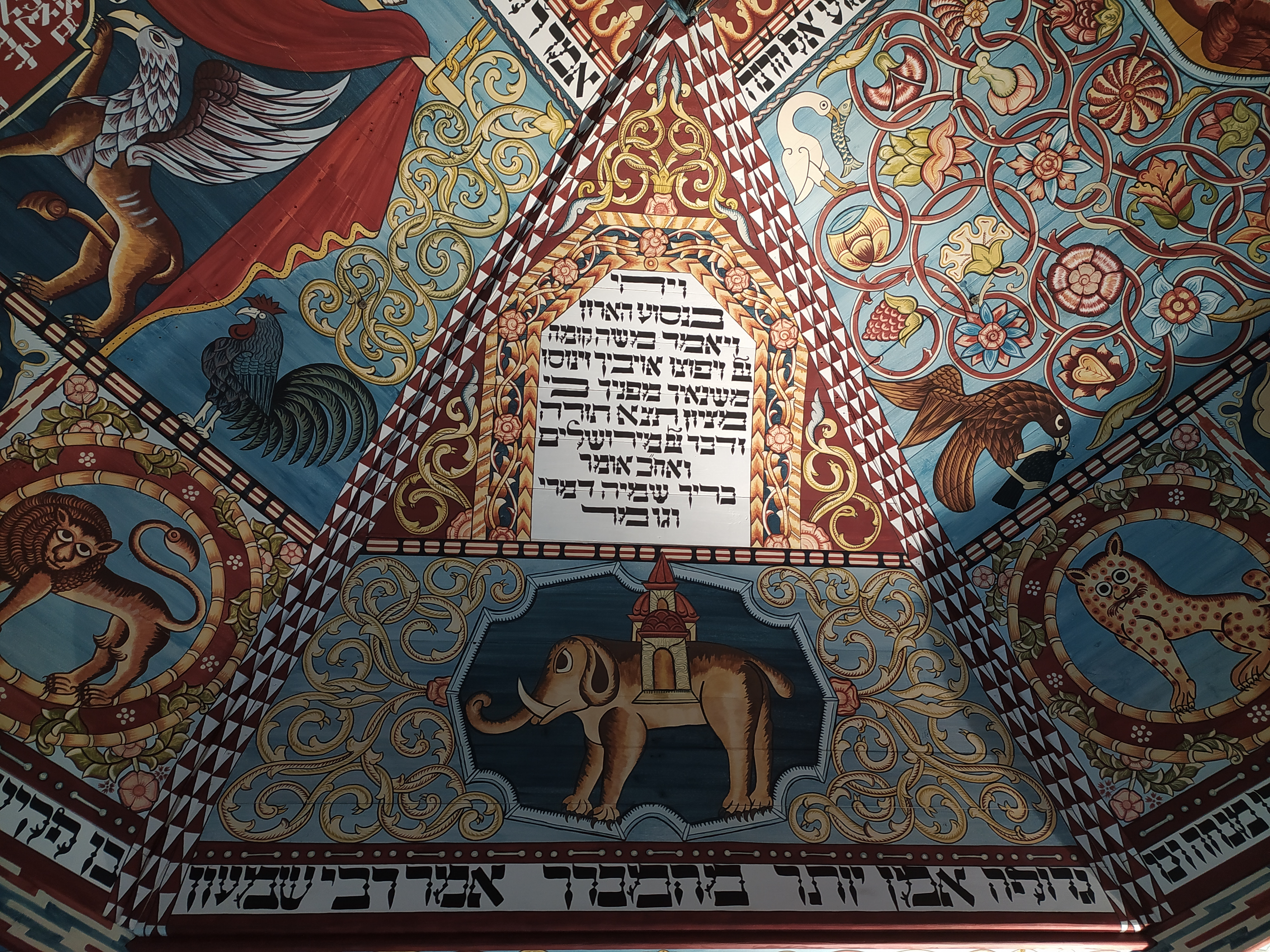

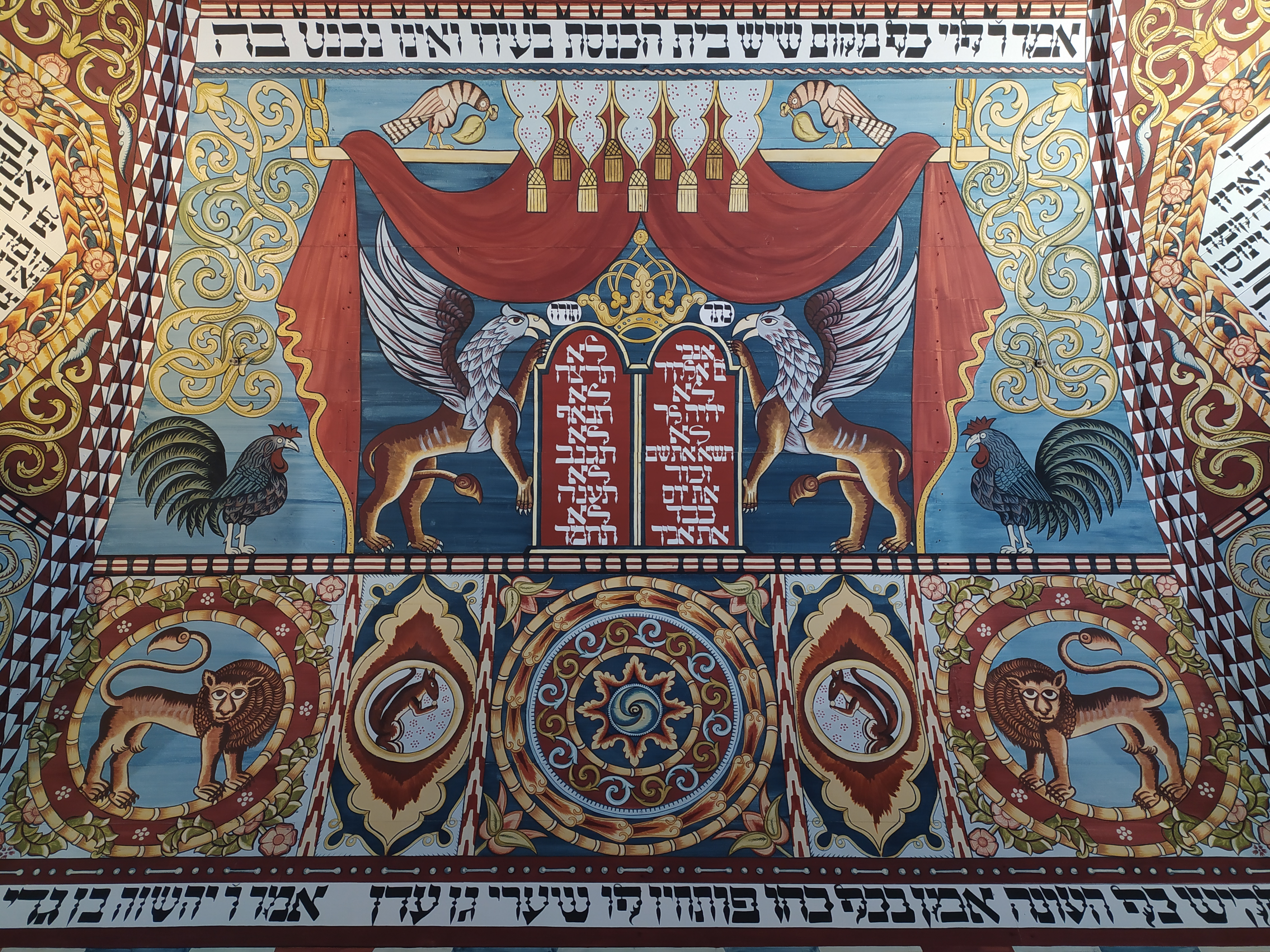

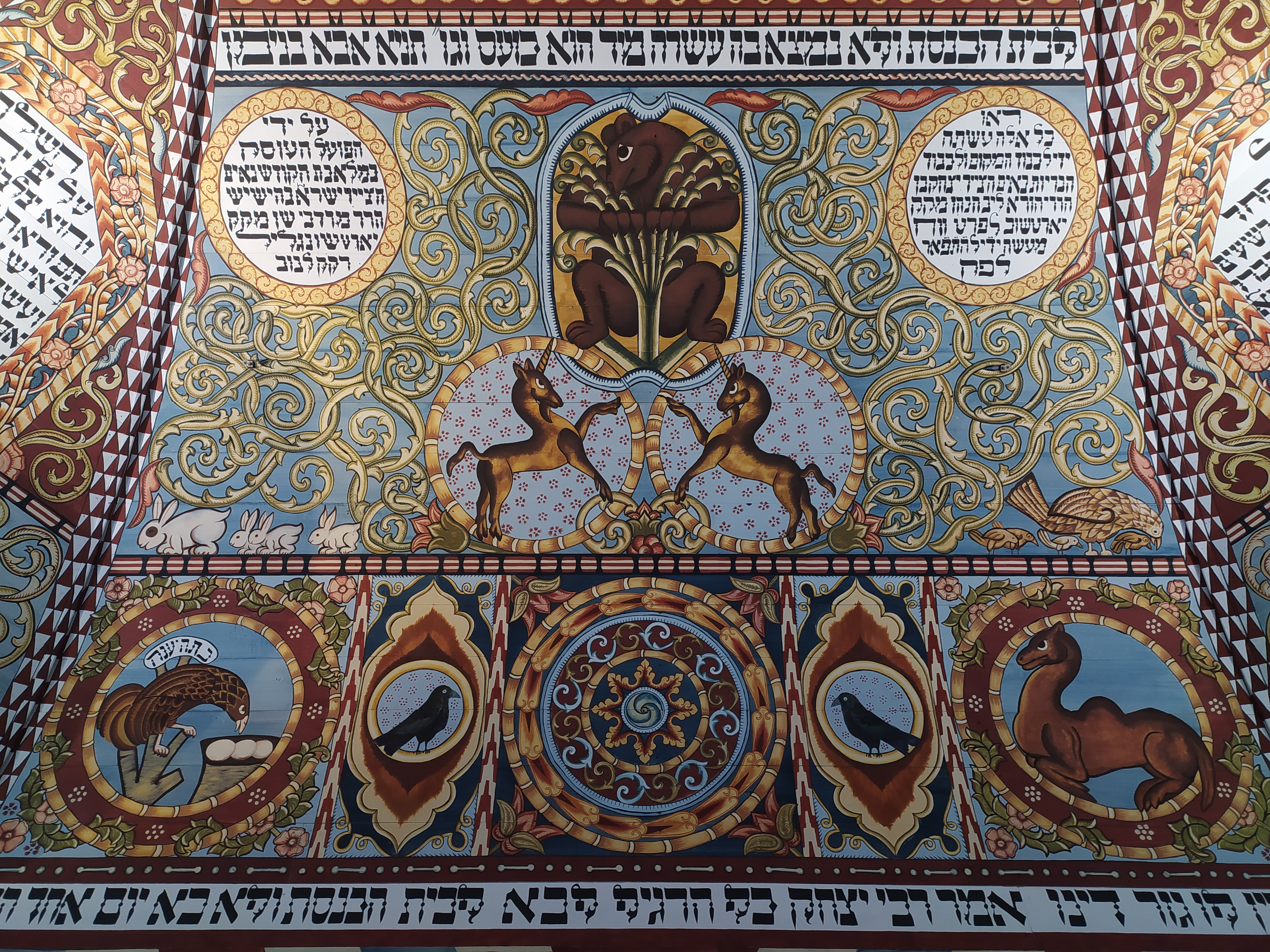

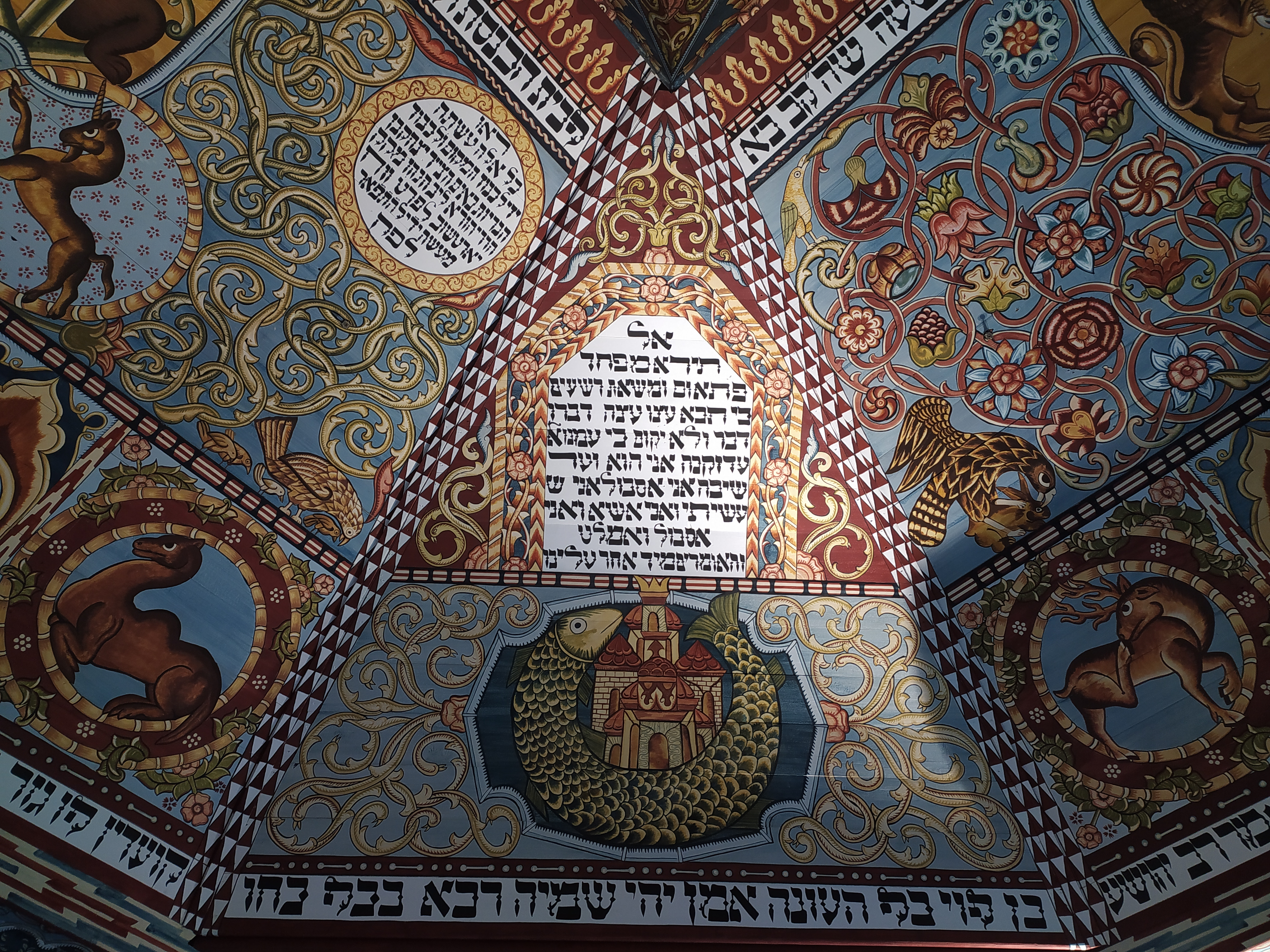

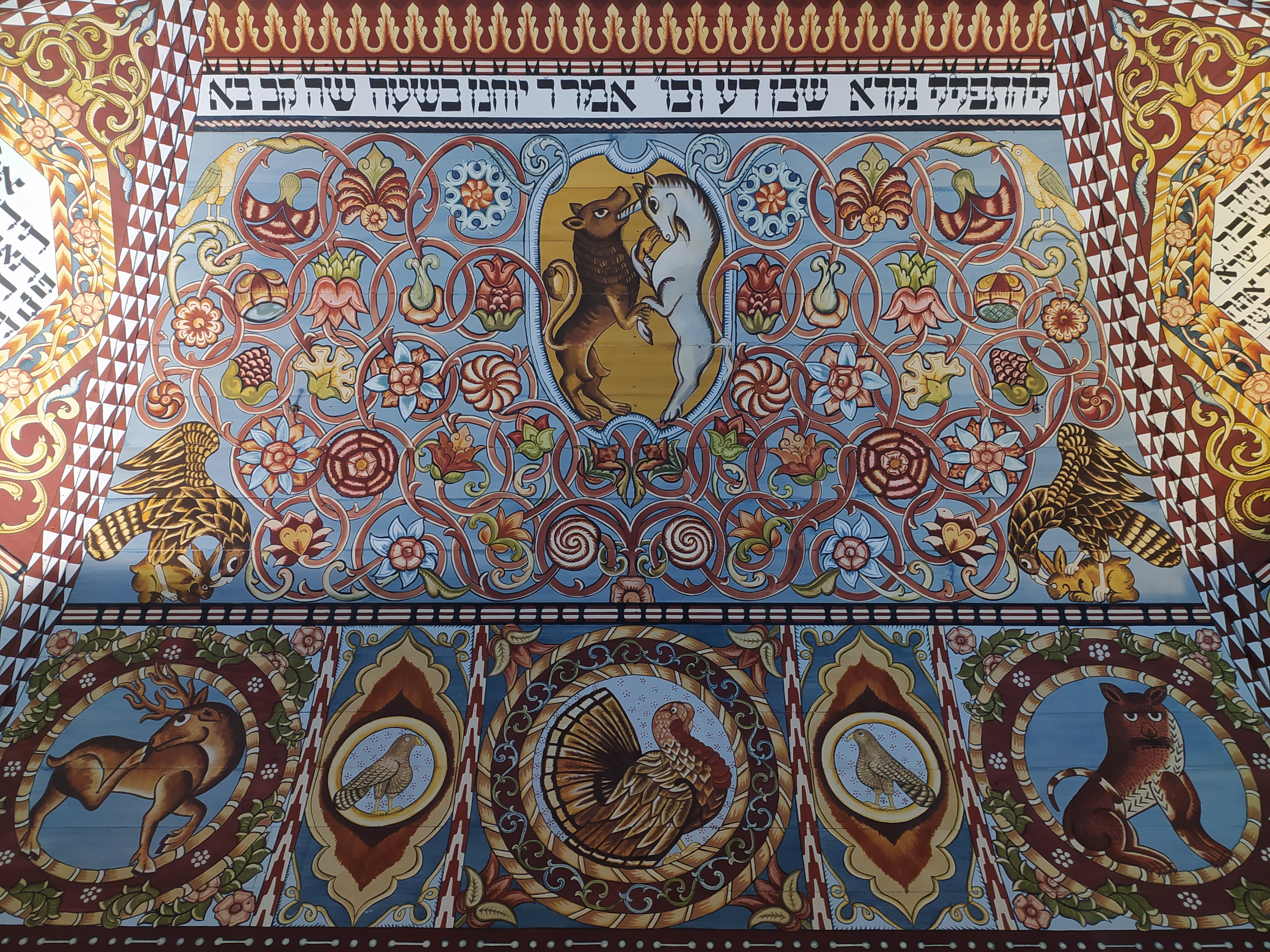

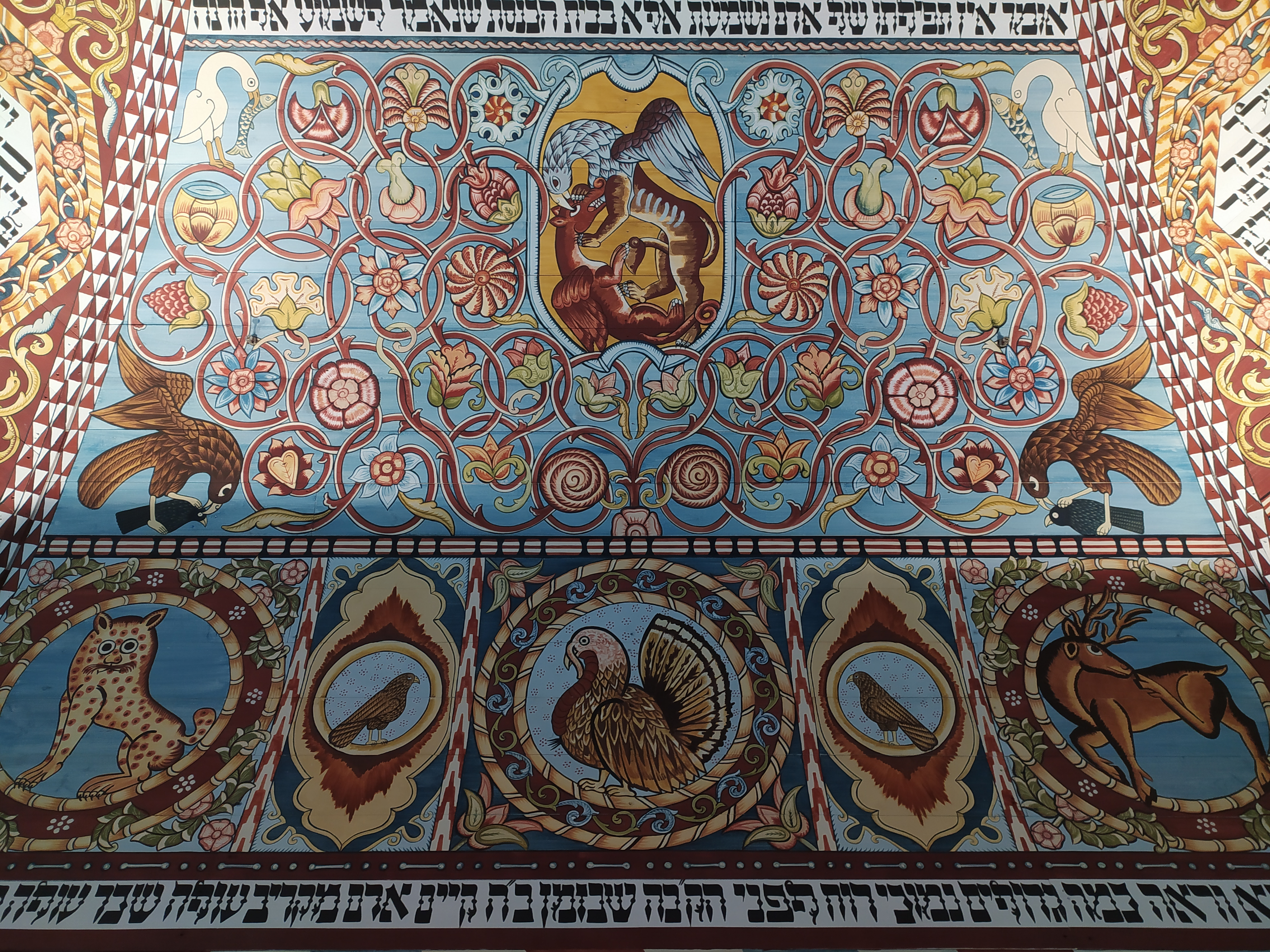

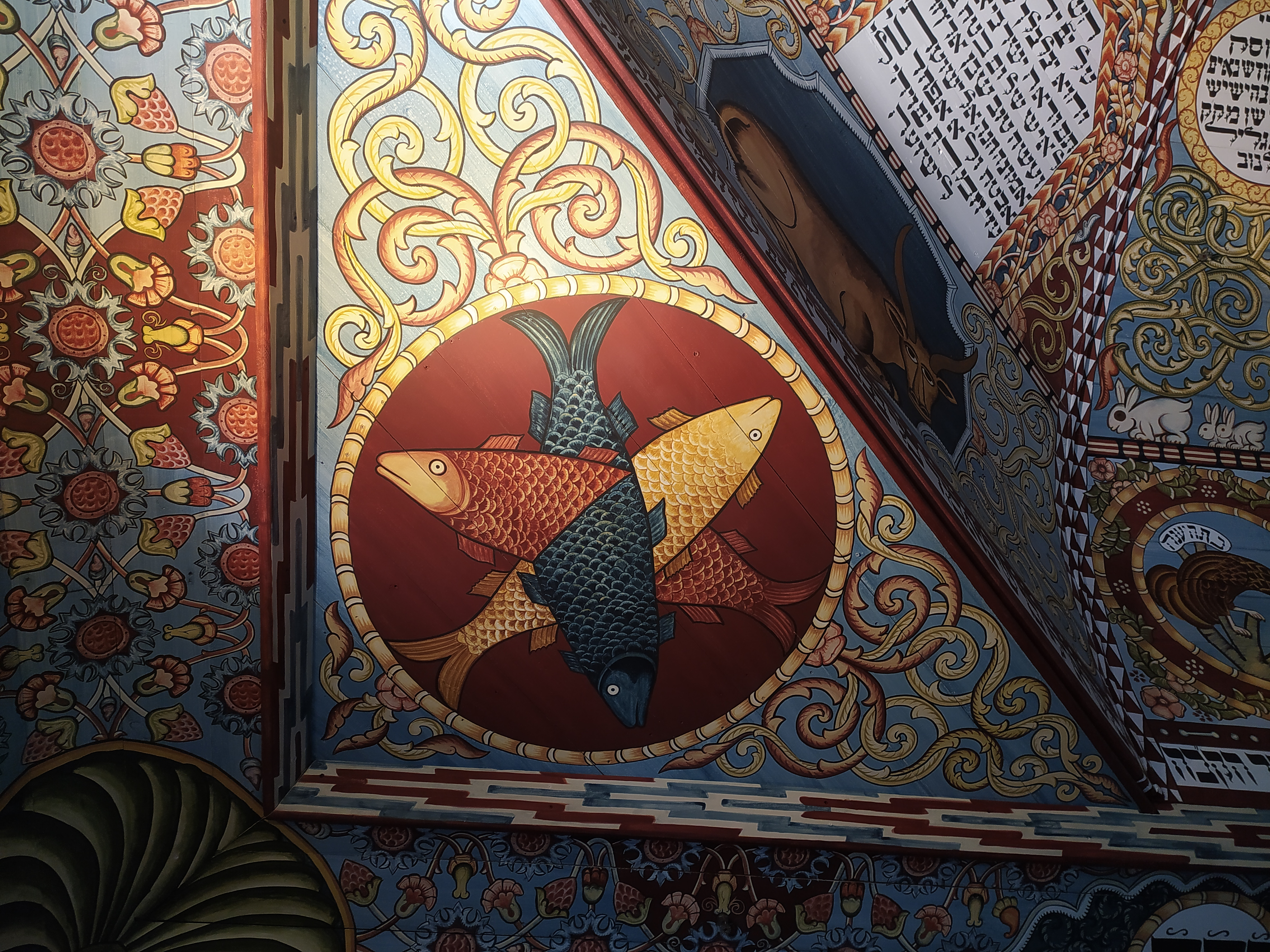

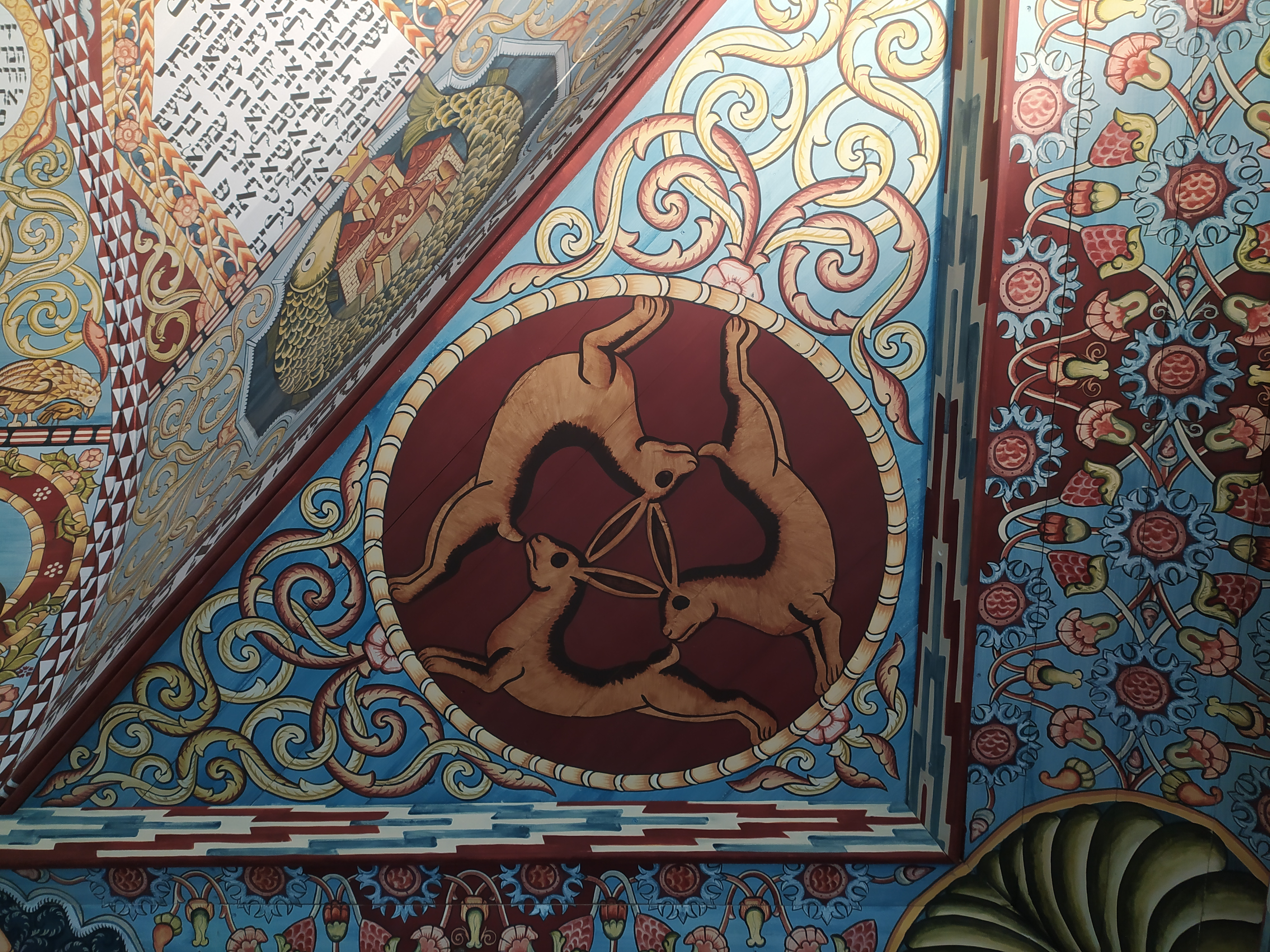

== Sources ==
- Maria i Kazimierz Piechotkowie: Bramy nieba: bożnice drewniane na ziemiach dawnej Rzeczypospolitej: Instytut Sztuki PAN: Warszawa: Wydaw. Krupski i S-ka, cop. 1996: ISBN 8386117028
