= POLIN Museum of the History of Polish Jews =

Historic museum in Warsaw

- Muzeum Historii Żydów Polskich
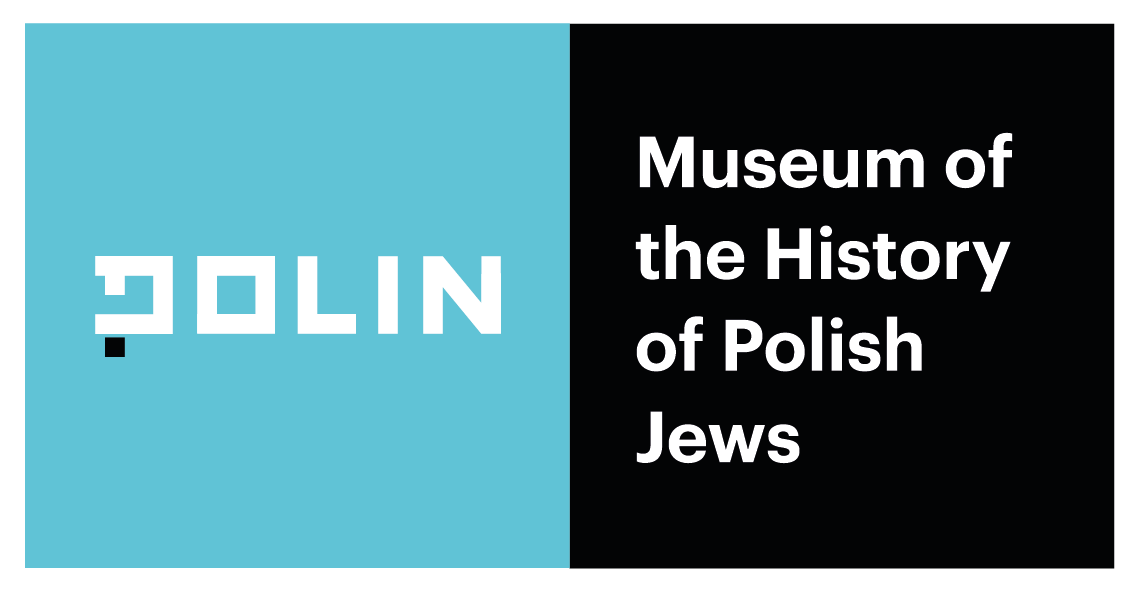

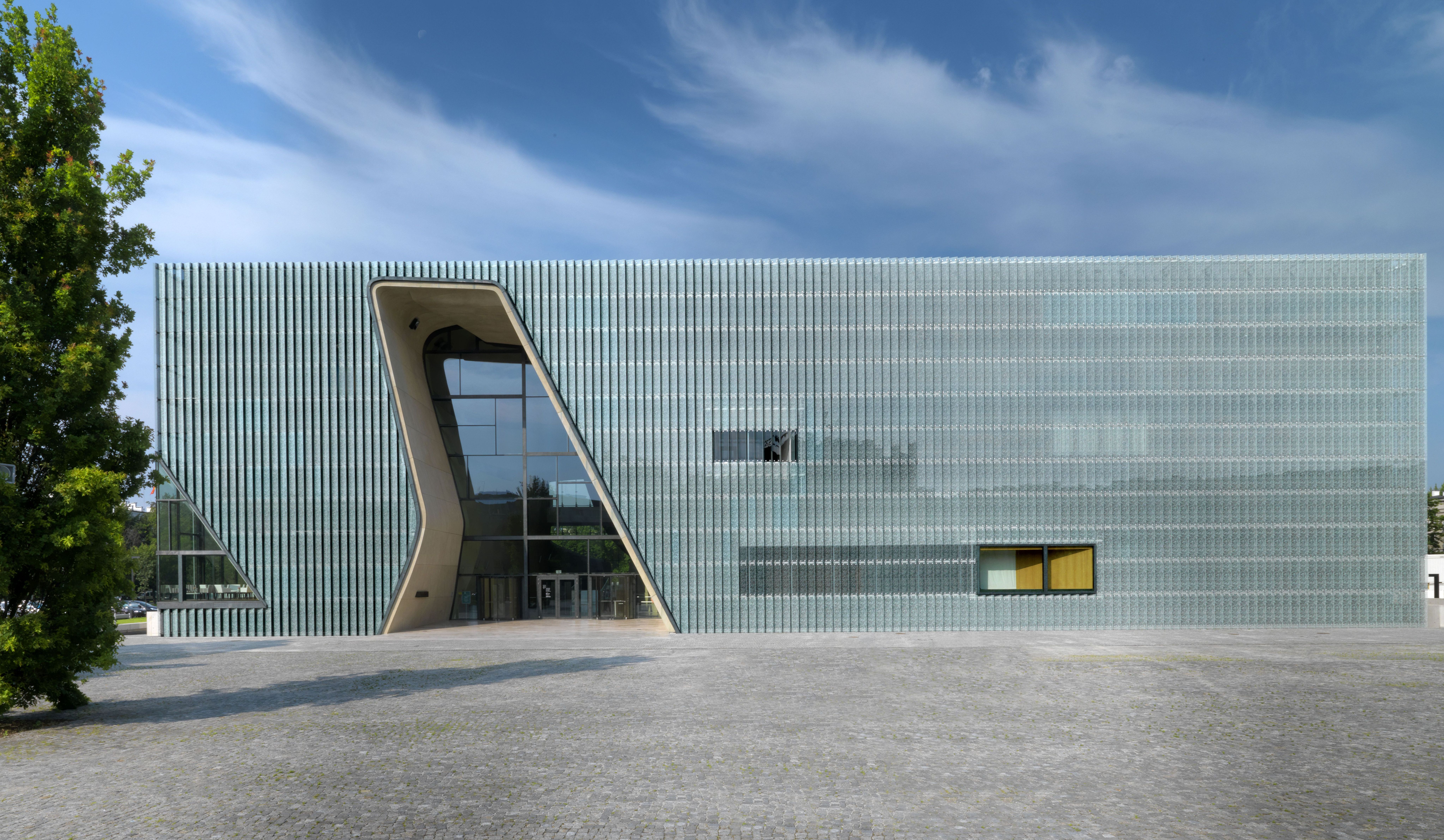
- The museum building
- Established: 2005 (opened April 2013)
- Location: Warsaw, Poland
- Coordinates: 52°14′58″N 20°59′35″E
- Type: Historical, cultural
- Collection size: History and culture of Polish Jews
- Visitors: expected 450,000
- Director: Zygmunt Stępiński
- Curator: Barbara Kirshenblatt-Gimblett
- Website: Museum official website

POLIN Museum of the History of Polish Jews (Polish: Muzeum Historii Żydów Polskich) is a museum dedicated to preserving and recalling the memory of the history of Jews in Poland. The museum is located on the site of the former Warsaw Ghetto. The Hebrew word Polin in the museum's English name means either "Poland" or "rest here" and relates to a legend about the arrival of the first Jews to Poland. Construction of the museum in designated land in Muranów, Warsaw's prewar Jewish quarter, began in 2009, following an international architectural competition won by Finnish architects Rainer Mahlamäki and Ilmari Lahdelma.

Completed at a cost of 320 million zł, the museum opened on 19 April 2013 with the core exhibition, showcasing the thousand-year history of Polish Jews, opening on 28 October 2014. The museum's architecture features a minimalist exterior with glass fins and copper mesh, and an interior designed by Event Communications. A central feature is the cavernous entrance hall, symbolizing the fractured history of Polish Jews. The organizational structure of POLIN includes an academic team led by Barbara Kirshenblatt-Gimblett and chief historian Antony Polonsky.

The museum's Core Exhibition, occupying over 4,000 square metres (43,000 ft^{2}), presents a comprehensive narrative of Jewish history in Poland across eight galleries. These galleries cover periods from the early Jewish settlers in Poland to the Holocaust and the post-war years, using multimedia narratives, interactive installations, and reconstructions, such as the Gwoździec synagogue's roof and ceiling. The museum also operates the Virtual Shtetl portal, providing extensive information on Jewish life in Poland before and after the Holocaust. The Core Exhibition won the European Museum of the Year Award in 2016.

== History ==
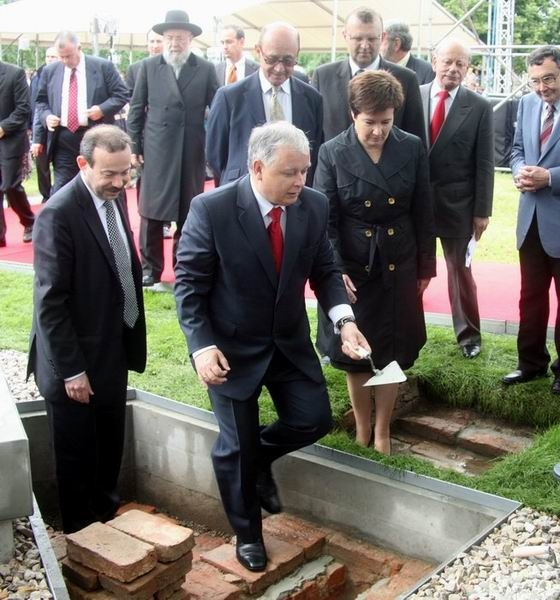
President of the Republic of Poland, Lech Kaczynski, at the groundbreaking ceremony for the POLIN Museum, 26 June 2007

The idea for creating a major new museum in Warsaw dedicated to the history of Polish Jews was initiated in 1995 by the Association of the Jewish Historical Institute of Poland. In the same year, the Warsaw City Council allocated the land for this purpose in Muranów, Warsaw's prewar Jewish quarter and site of the former Warsaw Ghetto, facing the Monument to the Warsaw Ghetto Heroes. In 2005, the Association of the Jewish Historical Institute of Poland established a private-public partnership with the Polish Ministry of Culture and National Heritage and the City of Warsaw. It was formally established in May 2006; its first director was Jerzy Halbersztadt. In September 2006, a specially designed tent called Ohel (the Hebrew word for tent) was erected for exhibitions and events at the site of the museum's future location.

An international architectural competition to design the building was launched in 2005, supported by a grant from the Ministry of Culture and National Heritage. On 30 June 2005, the winner was announced by the jury as the team of two Finnish architects, Rainer Mahlamäki and Ilmari Lahdelma. On 30 June 2009, construction of the building was officially inaugurated. The project was completed in 33 months at a cost of 150 million zł allocated by the ministry and the city, (Note: The Association for the Jewish Historical Institute of Poland took responsibility for creating the Core Exhibition and raising the funds for it at a cost of about 120 million zł) with a total cost of 320 million zł. It is financially supported by annual funds from the Polish Ministry of Culture and Warsaw City Council.

The building opened and the museum began its educational and cultural programs on 19 April 2013, on the 70th Anniversary of the Warsaw Ghetto Uprising. During the 18 months that followed, more than 180,000 visitors toured the building, visited the first temporary exhibitions, and took part in cultural and educational programs and events, including film screenings, debates, workshops, performances, concerts, and lectures. The Grand Opening, with the completed Core Exhibition, took place on 28 October 2014. The Core Exhibition documents and celebrates the thousand-year history of the Jewish community in Poland that was decimated by the Holocaust.

In 2016 the museum won the European Museum of the Year Award from the European Museum Forum.

== Construction ==
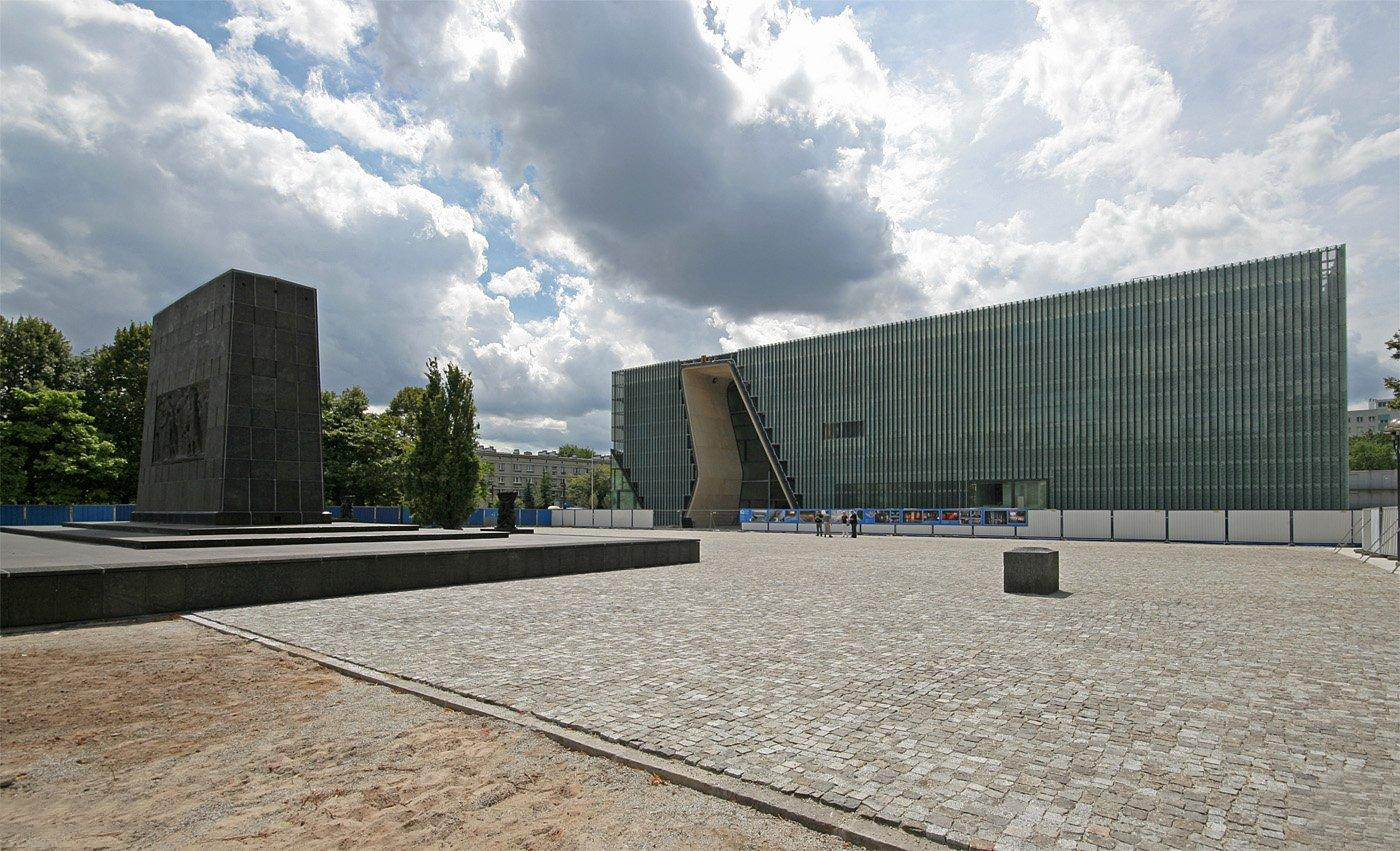
Museum faces the Memorial to the Warsaw Ghetto Uprising

The museum faces the memorial commemorating the Warsaw Ghetto Uprising of 1943. The winner of the architectural competition was Rainer Mahlamäki, of the architectural studio 'Lahdelma & Mahlamäki Oy in Helsinki, whose design was chosen from 100 submissions to the international architectural competition. The Polish firm Kuryłowicz & Associates was responsible for construction. The building's minimalist exterior is clad with glass fins and copper mesh. Silk-screened on the glass is the word Polin, in Latin and Hebrew letters.

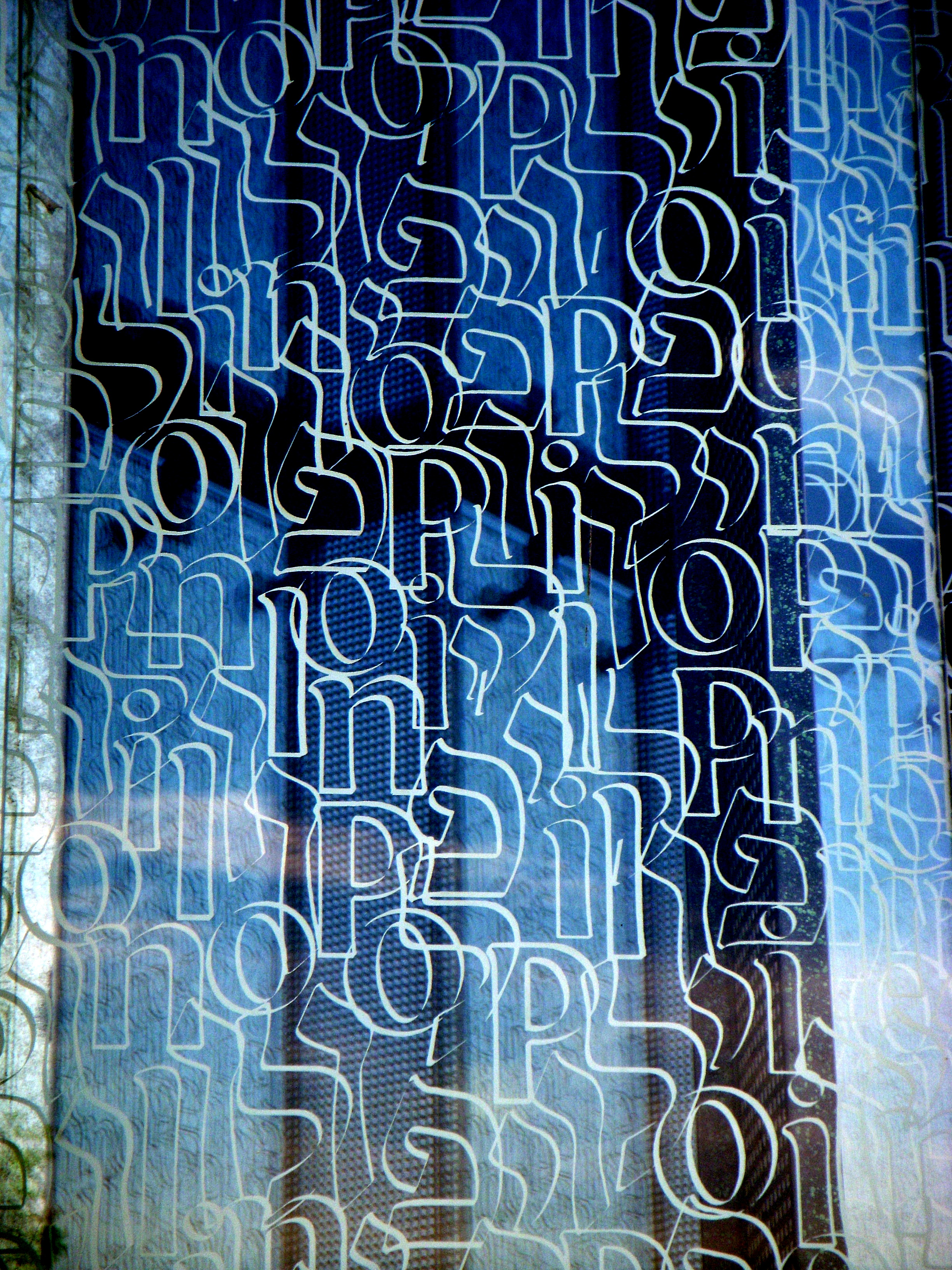
Hebrew and Latin letters of the word Polin

The central feature of the building is its cavernous entrance hall. The main hall forms a high, undulating wall. The empty space is a symbol of cracks in the history of Polish Jews. Similar in shape to gorge, which could be a reference to the crossing of the Red Sea known from the Exodus. The museum is nearly 13,000 square meters of usable space. At the lowest level, in the basement of the building, will be placed the main exhibition about the history of Jews from the Middle Ages to modern times. The museum building also has a multipurpose auditorium with 480 seats, temporary exhibition rooms, an education center, an information center, a playroom for children, café, shop, and a future kosher restaurant.

Since the museum presents the whole history of Jews in Poland, not only the period under German occupation, the designer wanted to avoid similarities to existing Holocaust museums (such as the Jewish Museum in Berlin and the museum at Yad Vashem) which had austere concrete structures. The architects kept the museum in the colors of sand, giving it a more approachable feeling.

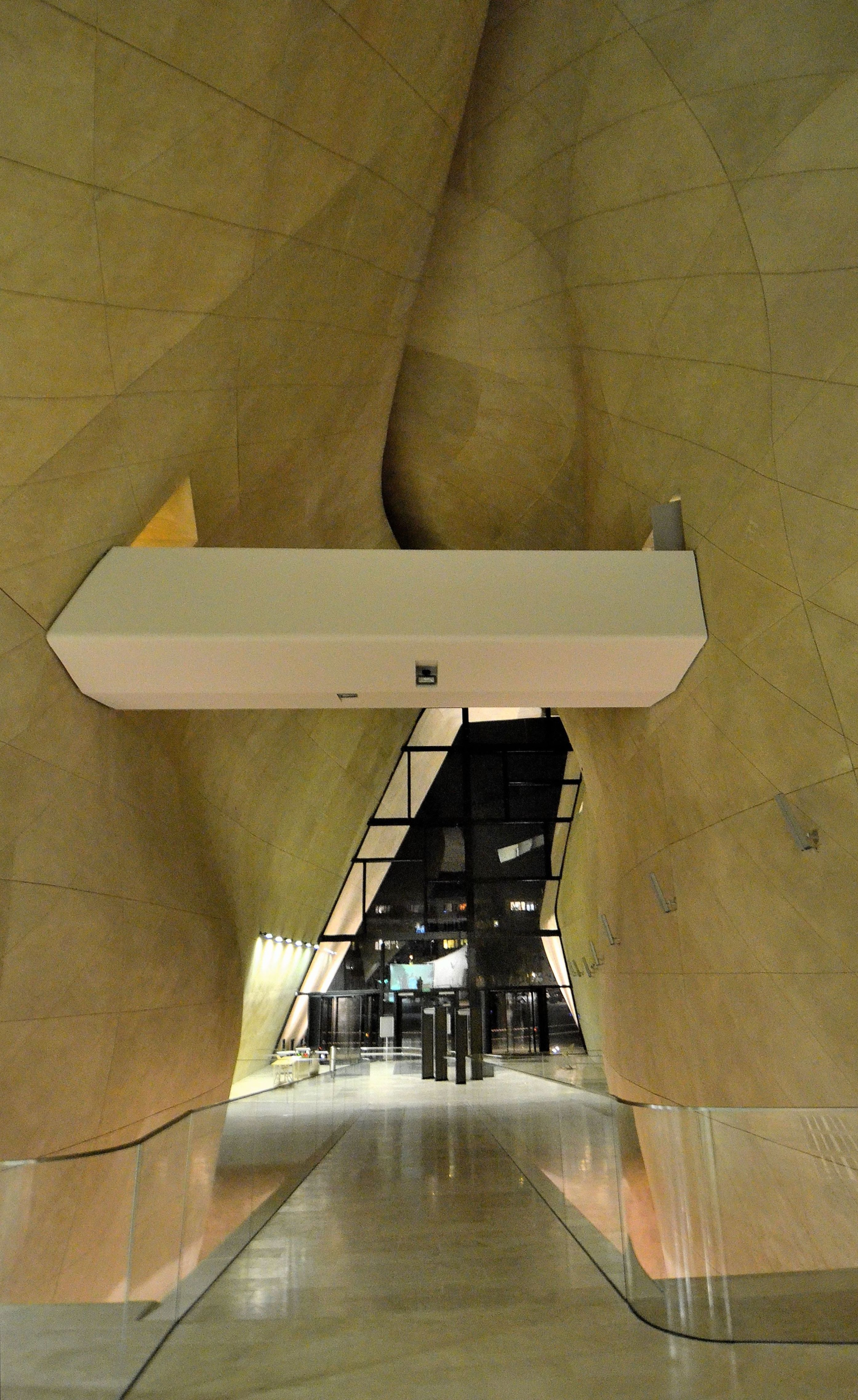
Main hall

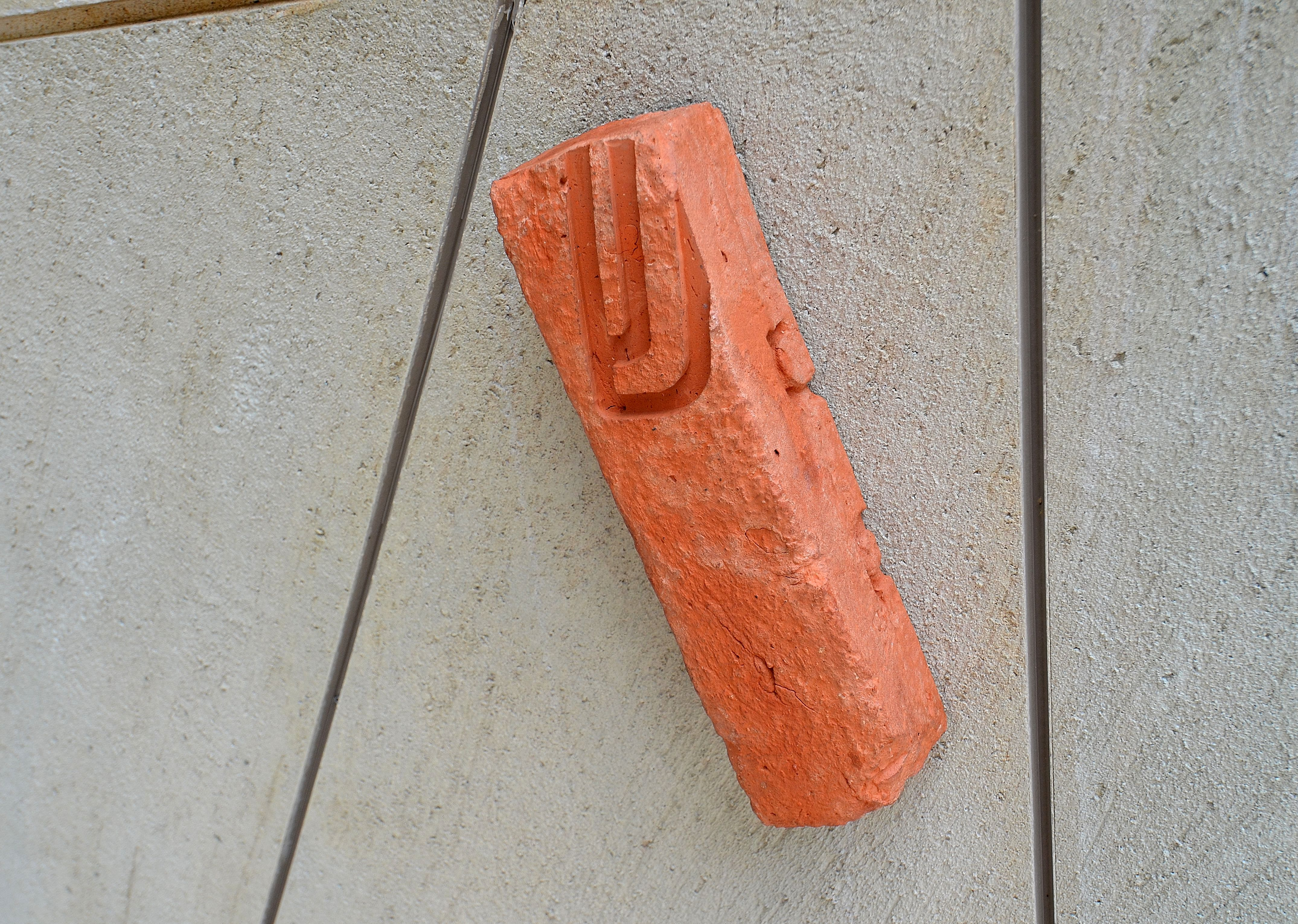
Traditional Mezuzah at the entrance

The interior design was conceived and master-planned by London-based museum design consultancy, Event Communications, along with local firms.

In 2008, the design of the museum was awarded the Chicago Athenaeum International Architecture Award. In 2014, the designer Rainer Mahlamäki was awarded the Finlandia Prize for Architecture for his design of the museum. The same year, the building received the SARP Award of the Year conferred by the Association of Polish Architects.

== Organizational structure ==
The Core Exhibition's academic team consists of Barbara Kirshenblatt-Gimblett (Program Director) of New York University, Hanna Zaremska of the Institute of History of the Polish Academy of Sciences, Adam Teller of Brown University, Igor Kąkolewski of the University of Warmia and Mazury, Marcin Wodziński of the University of Wrocław, Samuel Kassow of Trinity College, Barbara Engelking and Jacek Leociak of the Polish Center for Holocaust Research at the Polish Academy of Sciences, Helena Datner of the Jewish Historical Institute, and Stanisław Krajewski of Warsaw University. Antony Polonsky of Brandeis University is the Core Exhibition's chief historian.

American Friends of POLIN Museum of the History of Polish Jews is a U.S. based non-profit organization supporting the foundation of the museum.

On 17 June 2009, the museum launched the Virtual Shtetl portal, which collects and provides access to essential information about Jewish life in Poland before and after the Holocaust in Poland. The portal now features more than 1,240 towns with maps, statistics, and image galleries based in large measure on material provided by local history enthusiasts and former residents of those places.

== Distinguished Benefactors and Donors Council ==
=== Distinguished Benefactors ===
Distinguished Benefactors are a group of individuals and institutions who have supported the museum's programme activities after the Museum of the History of Polish Jews' founding campaign, which was conducted between 1993 and 2014 by the Association of the Jewish Historical Institute in Poland. The first Distinguished Benefactor is businessman, art collector and patron Gregory Jankilevitsch.

The current list of Distinguished Benefactors of the Museum of the History of Polish Jews includes:

- Koret Foundation
- Jan Kulczyk on behalf Kulczyk Holding
- Zygmunt Rolat
- Taube Family Foundation
- William K. Bowes Jr. Foundation
- The Parasol family oraz The Bonita Trust
- Monika and Wiktor Markowicz
- Irene Kronhill Pletka and The Kronhill Pletka Foundation
- Carmit and Ygal Ozechov
- Tomek Ulatowski
- Janette and Aleksander Goldberg
- Foundation for Polish-German Cooperation
- Conference on Jewish Material Claims Against Germany
- Rodziny Oliwenstein i Radzyminski
- The Neubauer Family Foundation on behalf of Miles Lerman
- The David Berg Foundation
- The Jewish Community Federation of San Francisco
- The Hellman Family
- The Nissenbaum Family Foundation
- Orange Polska
- Klara and Larry A. Silverstein
- Helen Tramiel z d. Goldgrub i Jack Tramiel z d. Trzmiel
- Federal Republic of Germany
- Kingdom of Norway
- Gregory Jankilevitsch
- Odette and Nimrod S. Ariav Foundation
- Robert Wereda

=== Donors Council ===
The Donors' Council is a support committee established in 2015. It is composed of representatives of the museum's Distinguished Benefactors. The role of the council is to support the museum and the Association of the Jewish Historical Institute in Poland in its dealings with foreign Jewish communities, opinion leaders and potential new donors. Members of the council also sponsor the fundraising budget of the Jewish Historical Institute.

Current members of the Donors' Council are:

- Tad Taube
- Zygmunt Rolat
- Anita Friedman
- Corinne Evens
- Irene Kronhill Pletka
- Ygal Ozechov
- Tomek Ulatowski
- Andrzej Rojek

== Core exhibition ==
The core exhibition occupies more than 4,000 m^{2} (43,000 sq ft) of space. It consists of eight galleries that document and celebrate the thousand-year history of the Jewish community in Poland – once the largest Jewish community in the world – that was almost entirely destroyed during the Holocaust. The exhibition includes a multimedia narrative with interactive installations, paintings and oral histories, among other features created by more than 120 scholars and curators. One item is a replica of the roof and ceiling of a 17th-century Gwoździec synagogue.

== Galleries ==
=== Forest ===
This gallery tells the tale of how, fleeing from persecution in Western Europe, the Jews came to Poland. Over the next thousand years, the country would become the largest European home for the Jewish community.

=== First Encounters (10th century–1507) ===
This gallery is devoted to the first Jewish settlers in Poland. Visitors meet Ibrahim ibn Jakub, a Jewish diplomat from Cordoba, author of famous notes from a trip to Europe. One of the most interesting objects presented in the gallery is the first sentence written in Yiddish in the prayer book of 1272.

=== Paradisus Iudaeorum (1569–1648) ===
This gallery presents how the Jewish community was organized and what role Jews played in the country's economy. One of the most important elements in this gallery is an interactive model of Kraków and Jewish Kazimierz, showing the rich culture of the local Jewish community. Visitors learn that religious tolerance in Poland made it a "Paradisus Judaeorum" (Jewish paradise). This golden age of the Jewish community in Poland ended with pogroms during the Khmelnitsky Uprising. This event is commemorated by a symbolic fire gall leading to the next gallery.

The title of the gallery has been subject to some criticism and debate among scholars due to the antisemitic roots of the proverb it is taken from, a 17th-century condemnation of the "rampant prevalence of the infidels".

=== The Jewish Town (1648–1772) ===
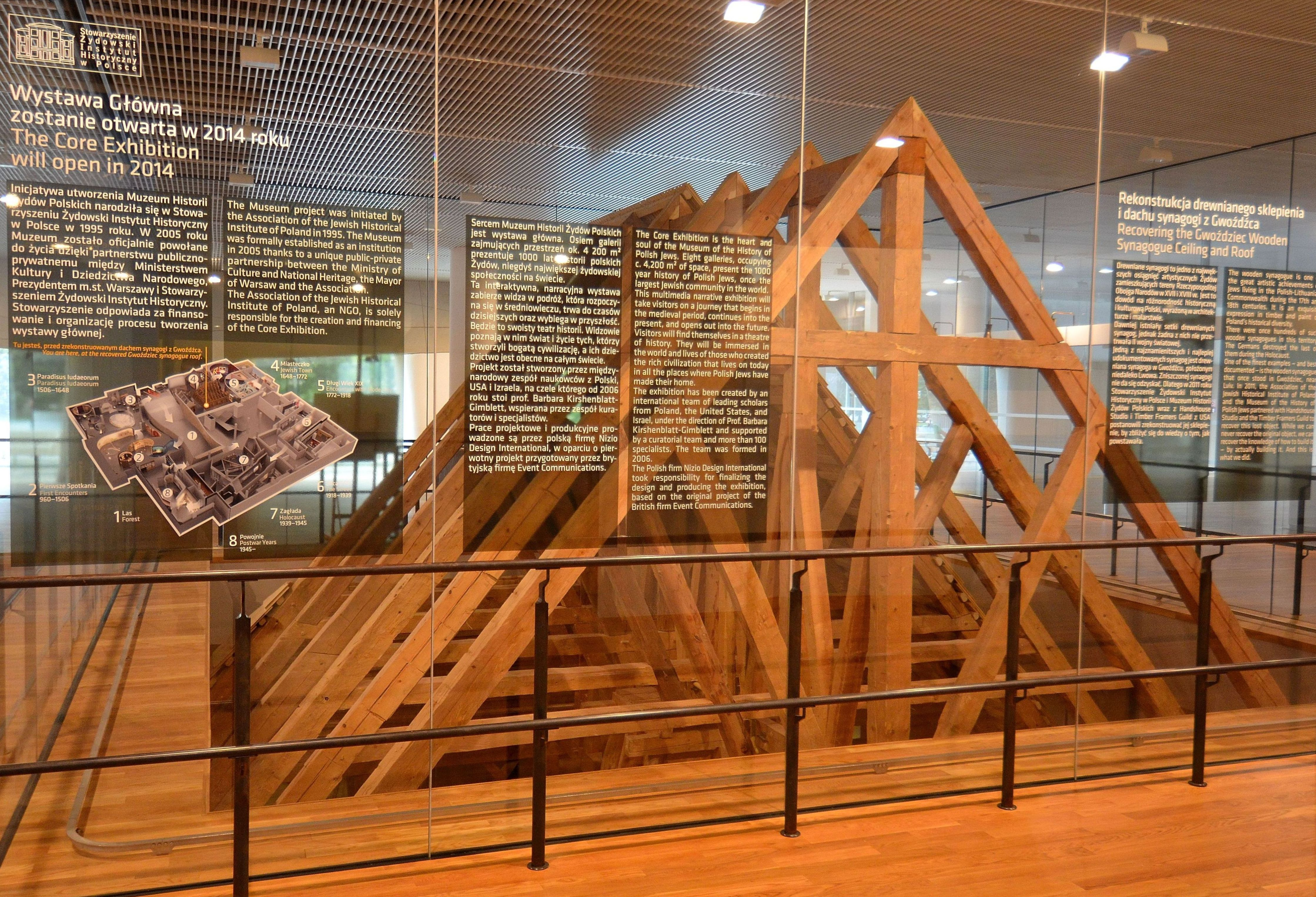
Gwoździec synagogue roof reconstruction

This gallery presents the history of Polish Jews until the period of the partitions. It is shown by an example of a typical borderland town where Jews constituted a significant part of the population. The most important part of this gallery is a unique reconstruction of the roof and ceiling of Gwoździec, a wooden synagogue that was located in pre-war Poland.

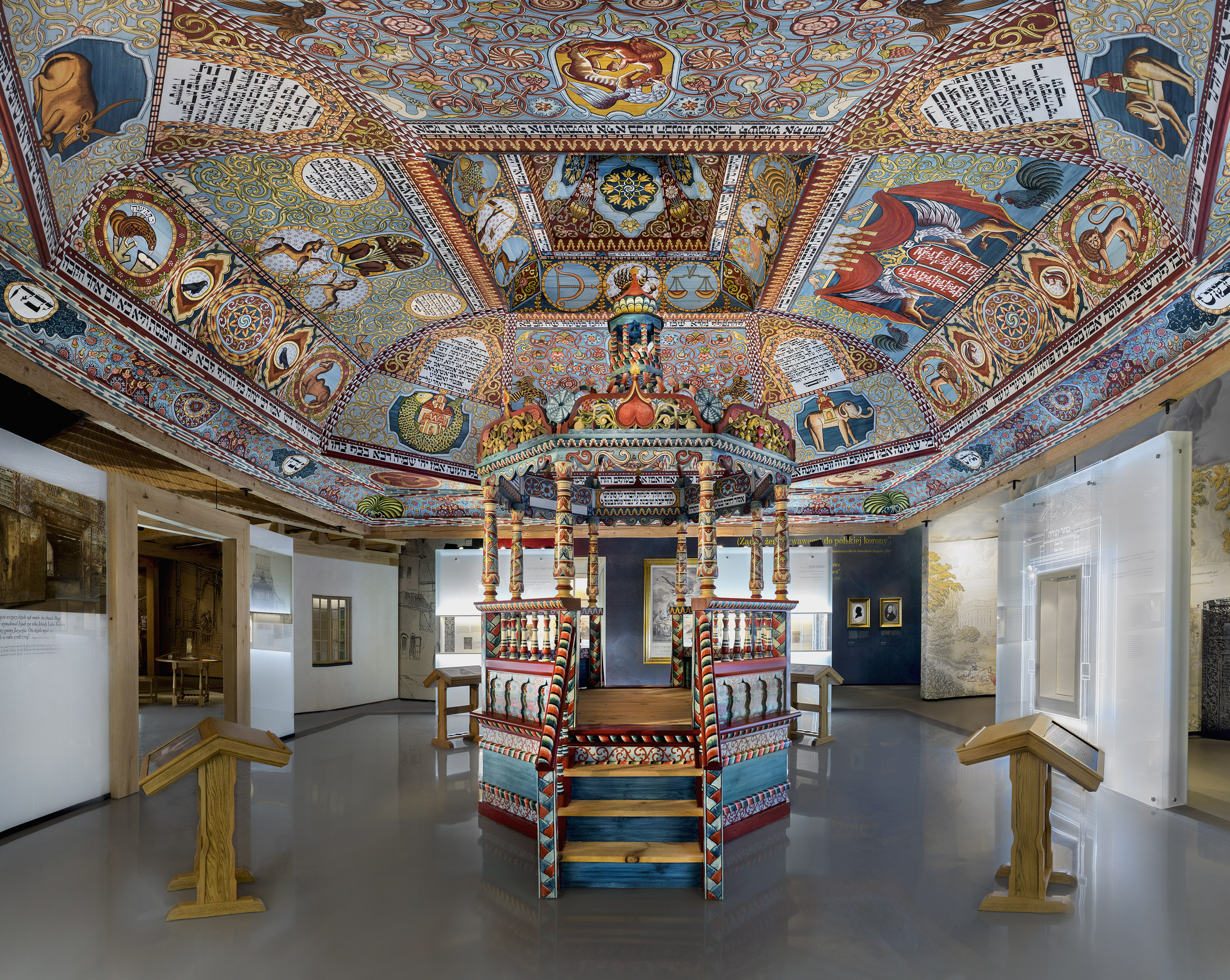
Reconstructed vault and bimah in the Museum of the History of Polish Jews

=== Encounters with Modernity (1772–1914) ===
This gallery presents the time of the partitions when Jews shared the fate of Polish society divided between Austria, Prussia and Russia. The exhibition includes the role played by Jewish entrepreneurs, such as Izrael Kalmanowicz Poznański, in the industrial revolution in Polish lands. Visitors also learn about changes in traditional Jewish rituals and other areas of life, and the emergence of new social movements, religious and political.

=== On the Jewish Street (1914–1939) ===
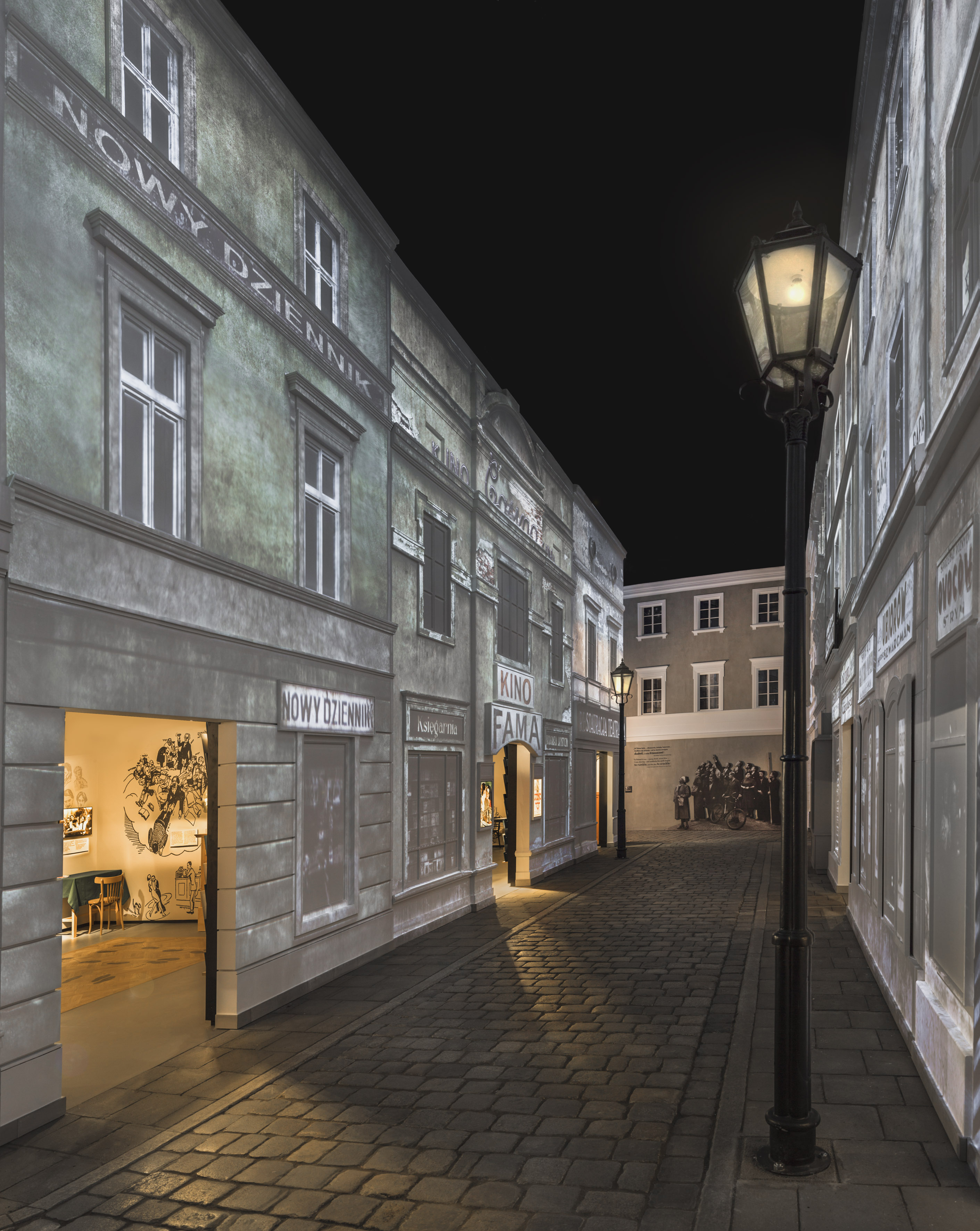
"On the Jewish Street" gallery with entrances to exhibition halls

This gallery is devoted to the period of the Second Polish Republic, which is seen – despite the challenges that the young country had to face – as a second golden age in the history of Polish Jews. A graphic timeline is presented, indicating many of the most important political events of the interwar period. The exhibition also highlights Jewish film, theater, and literature.

=== Holocaust (1939–1944) ===
This gallery shows the tragedy of the Holocaust during the German occupation of Poland, which resulted in the deaths of approximately 90 percent of the 3.3 million Polish Jews. Visitors are shown the history of the Warsaw Ghetto and introduced to Emanuel Ringelblum and the clandestine group of volunteers that went by the code name Oyneg Shabbos, who collected documents and solicited testimonies and reports chronicling life in the Ghetto during the Nazi occupation. The gallery also portrays the horrors experienced by the Poles during World War II as well as their reactions and responses to the extermination of Jews.

=== Postwar Years (1944–present) ===
The last gallery shows the period after 1945, when most of the survivors of the Holocaust emigrated for various reasons, including the post-war takeover of Poland by the Soviets, the hostility of some portion of the Polish populace, and the state-sponsored anti-Semitic campaign conducted by the communist authorities in 1968. An important date is the year 1989, marking the end of Soviet domination, followed by the revival of a small but dynamic Jewish community in Poland.

The exhibition was developed by an international team of scholars and museum professionals from Poland, the United States and Israel, in conjunction with the museum's curatorial team under the direction of Barbara Kirshenblatt-Gimblett.

== Reception ==
The museum's opening exhibition, focused on "post-Jewish" objects retained by non-Jewish Polish individuals, was criticized by anthropologist Erica Lehrer. The catalog referred to the objects being “found,” “rescued,” “salvaged,” “kept safely,” and “cared for”, without discussing the "extortion, theft, and murder" by which many such objects were obtained.

Jewish activists called for boycotting the museum because it held a joint event with an anti-Israel organization in 2024. The museum director stated that they had contacted the organization to be more aware of their content, and said that the museum does not support everything presented by organizations they work with.

== See also ==
- History of the Jews in Poland
- Gwoździec Synagogue
- Galicia Jewish Museum
- Yad Vashem
- Jewish Museum in Berlin
- United States Holocaust Memorial Museum
