= Vowpa =

Agrotown in Grodno Region, Belarus

Vowpa Воўпа (Belarusian)
- Agrotown
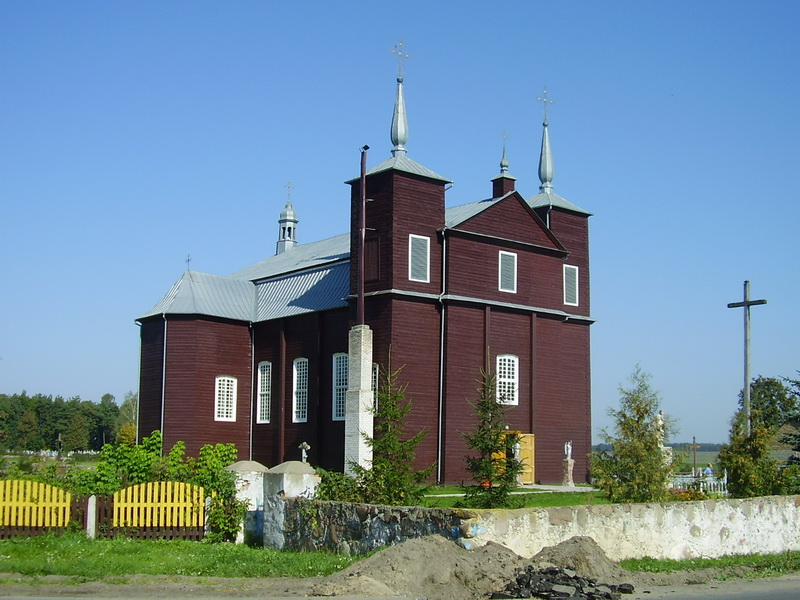
- Church of Saint John the Baptist

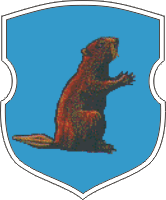
- Seal

- Location within Belarus
- Coordinates: 53°22′08″N 24°22′18″E
- Country: Belarus
- Region: Grodno Region
- District: Vawkavysk District
- Time zone: UTC+3 (MSK)

Vowpa (Note: Also spelled Voŭpa, Volpe, Wolpe, Wolp, or Woupa) (Belarusian: Воўпа; Polish: Wołpa; Russian: Вольпа, romanized: Volpa; Lithuanian: Volpos) is an agrotown in Vawkavysk District, Grodno Region, in western Belarus. It serves as the administrative center of Vowpa selsoviet.

== History ==
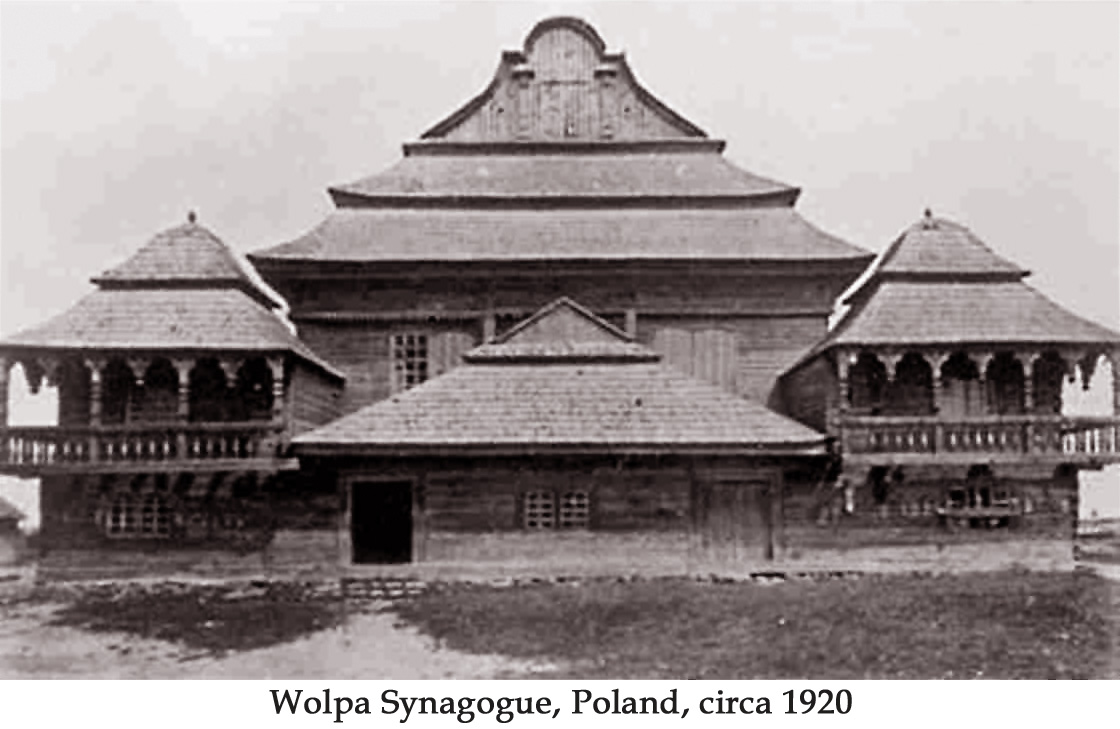
Wołpa Synagogue, 1920, Second Polish Republic

At various times it was either a royal town of the Polish–Lithuanian Commonwealth or a private town of the Holszański and Sapieha families, administratively located in the Wołkowysk County in the Nowogródek Voivodeship. It was often visited by King Stephen Bathory during his stays in nearby Grodno. In 1643, Kazimierz Leon Sapieha received King Władysław IV Vasa in the town.

The Wołpa Synagogue is located in the town, and is reputed to be the "most beautiful" of the wooden synagogues of the former Polish–Lithuanian Commonwealth, a "masterwork" of wooden architecture.

In the interwar period, Wołpa, as it was known in Polish, was administratively located in the Grodno County in the Białystok Voivodeship of Poland. In the 1921 census, 59.9% people declared Polish nationality, 38.9% declared Jewish nationality and 1.2% declared Belarusian nationality.

During World War II, the town was first occupied by the Soviet Union until 1941, then by Nazi Germany until 1944, and re-occupied by the Soviet Union afterwards.

== Demographics ==
Historical population
Year	Pop.	±%
1886	1,634	—
1921	1,731	+5.9%
