= Zamelis Synagogue =

Former synagogue in Vilnius, Lithuania

- Lithuanian: Zamelio sinagoga
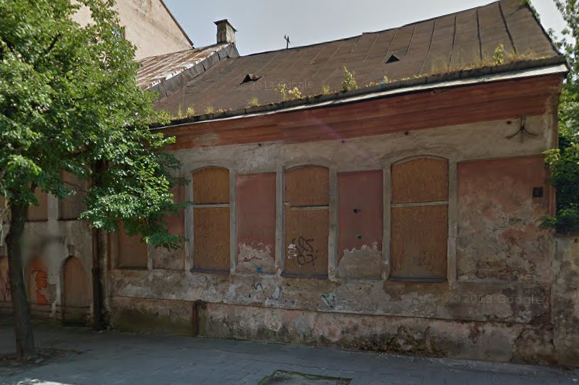
- Lower part of the abandoned synagogue

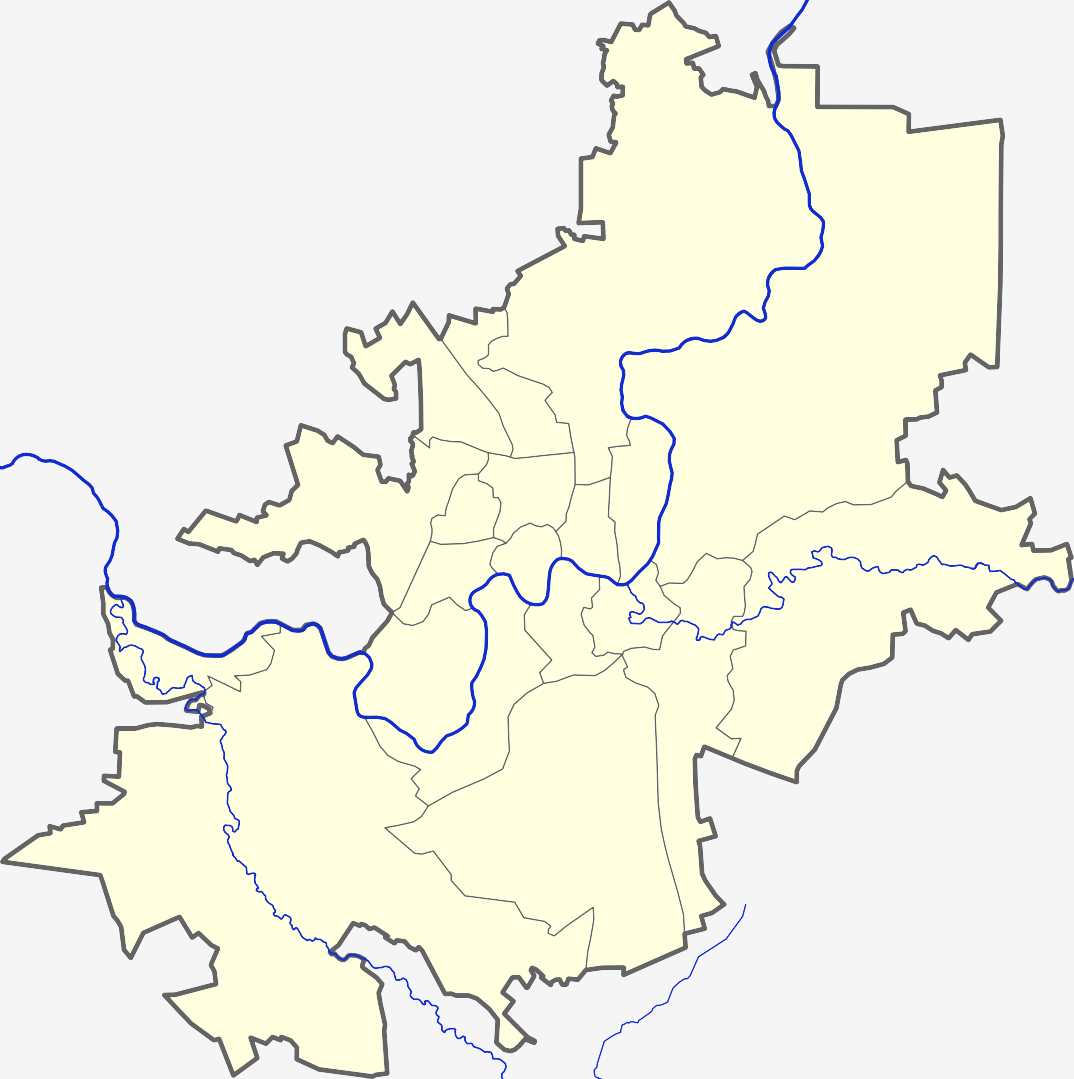
- Location of the former synagogue in Vilnius

Religion
- Affiliation: Judaism (former)
- Rite: Nusach Ashkenaz
- Ecclesiastical or organizational status: Synagogue (1833–1940); Profane use (1945–1990); Cultural center (since 2015)
- Status: Abandoned (as a synagogue); Repurposed

Location
- Location: 6 Gėlių Street, Vilnius, Vilnius County
- Country: Lithuania
- Interactive map of Zamelis Synagogue
- Coordinates: 54°40′26″N 25°17′02″E

Architecture
- Architect: Alekse Polozov
- Type: Synagogue architecture
- Style: Historicist
- Groundbreaking: 1817
- Completed: 1833
- Materials: Brick

The Zamelis Synagogue (Lithuanian: Zamelio sinagoga), also called Zavl's Synagogue, is a former Jewish congregation and synagogue, located at 6 Gėlių Street, in Vilnius, in the Vilnius County of Lithuania.

== History ==
Located on a site donated by Zavel Peisakhovich, where once stood a wooden synagogue, the synagogue was designed by Alekse Polozov in the Historicist style and built at the beginning of the 19th century, between 1817 and 1833. It was actively used until 1940. Sir Moses Montefiori visited the synagogue in 1846. After World War II it was used as a warehouse and apartment complex until 1990. At the end of the 20th century, the building was abandoned.

In 2015, reconstruction works started in the abandoned synagogue, funded by the Cultural Heritage Department under the Lithuanian Ministry of Culture and the Lithuanian Jewish Community via the Goodwill Foundation. As of 2018, the building was used as a cultural center.

== See also ==
- History of the Jews in Lithuania
- Lithuanian Jews
