= Wołpa Synagogue =

Former synagogue in Vowpa, Belarus

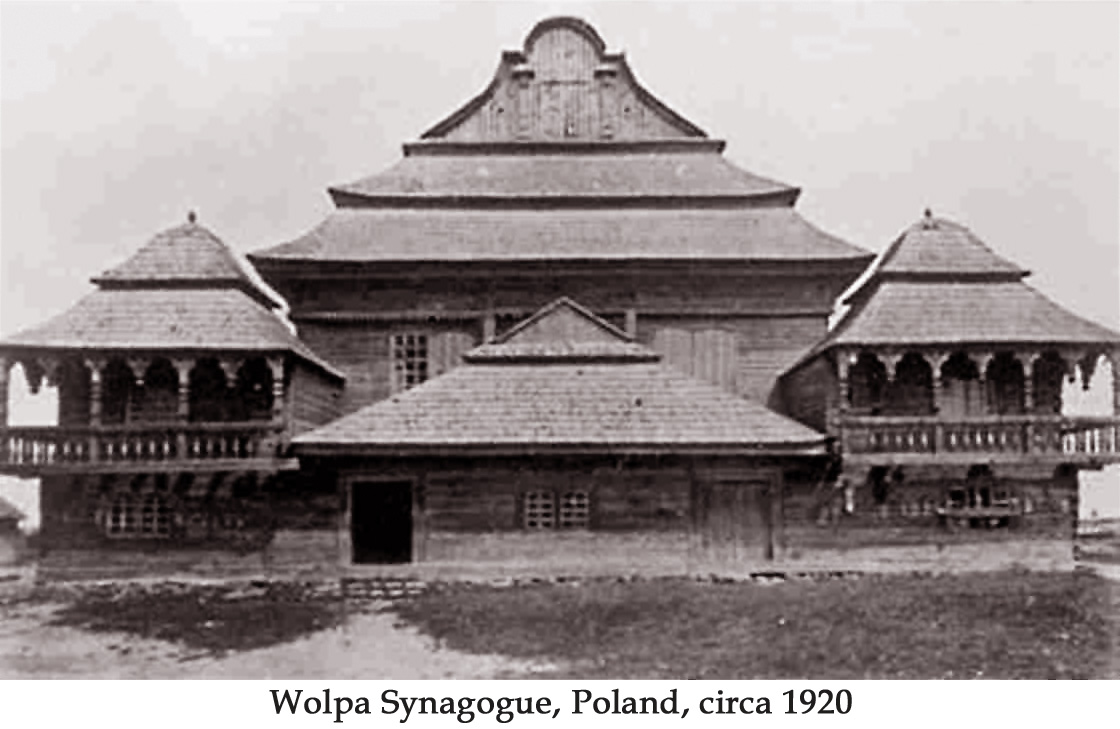
- The former Wolpa Synagogue, 1920, Second Polish Republic

- The former synagogue in what is now Belarus

Religion
- Affiliation: Judaism (former)
- Ecclesiastical or organizational status: Synagogue (–1940s)
- Status: Destroyed

Location
- Location: Vowpa
- Country: Belarus
- Interactive map of Wołpa Synagogue
- Coordinates: 53°21′52″N 24°21′57″E

Architecture
- Type: Synagogue architecture
- Style: Vernacular
- Completed: c. 1643
- Destroyed: November 1942; during World War II
- Materials: Timber

The Wołpa Synagogue was a synagogue located in the town of Vowpa, in what is now western Belarus. It was reputed to be the "most beautiful" of the wooden synagogues of the former Polish–Lithuanian Commonwealth, a "masterwork" of wooden vernacular architecture.

== History ==
The synagogue was built in c. 1643, and altered in minor ways several times. In 1929 the building was listed as a Polish Monument of Culture. It was burnt by the Germans during the World War II, believed to be in November 1942.

== Architecture ==
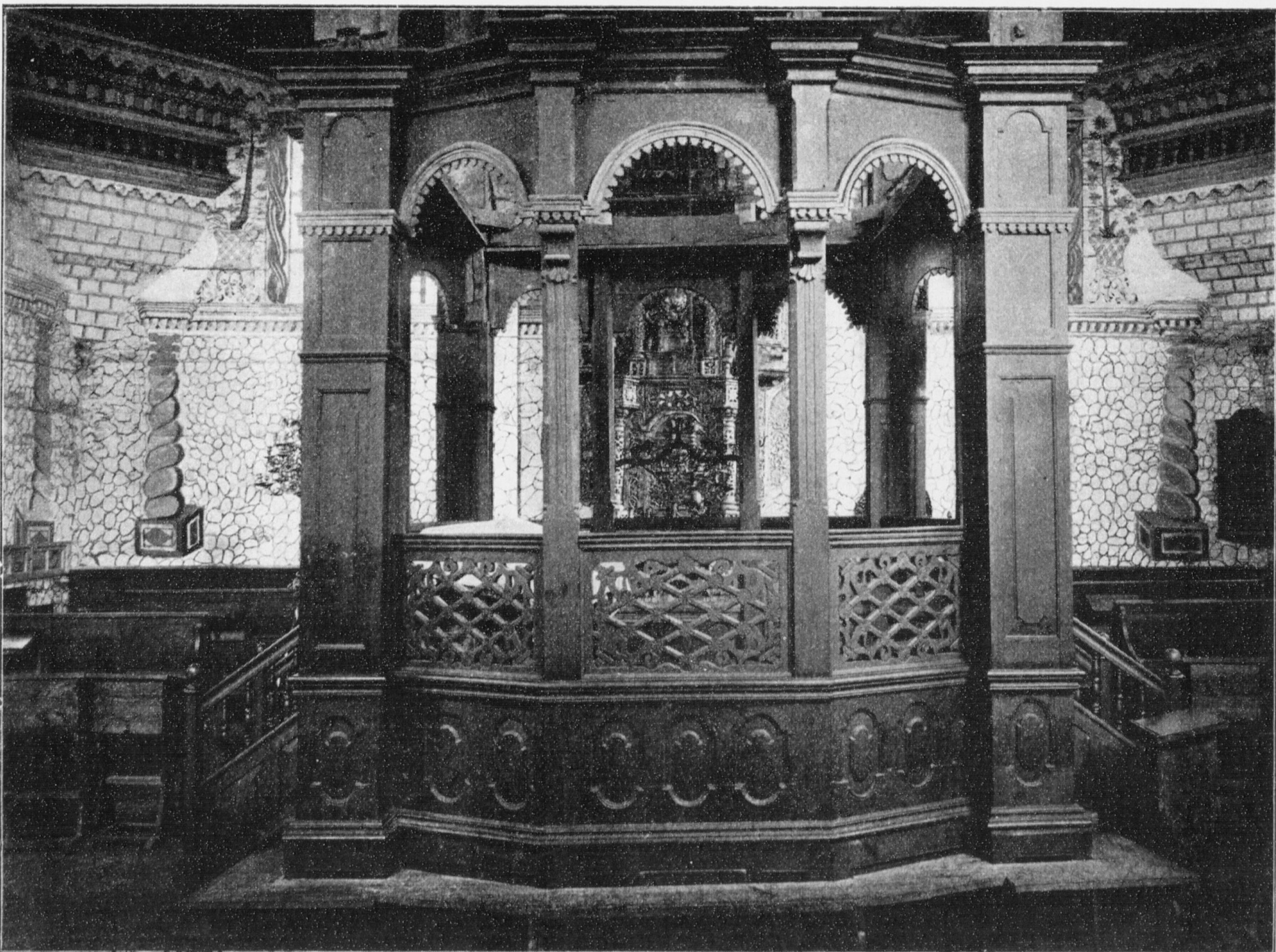
Bimah in the Wolpa Synagogue, 1845

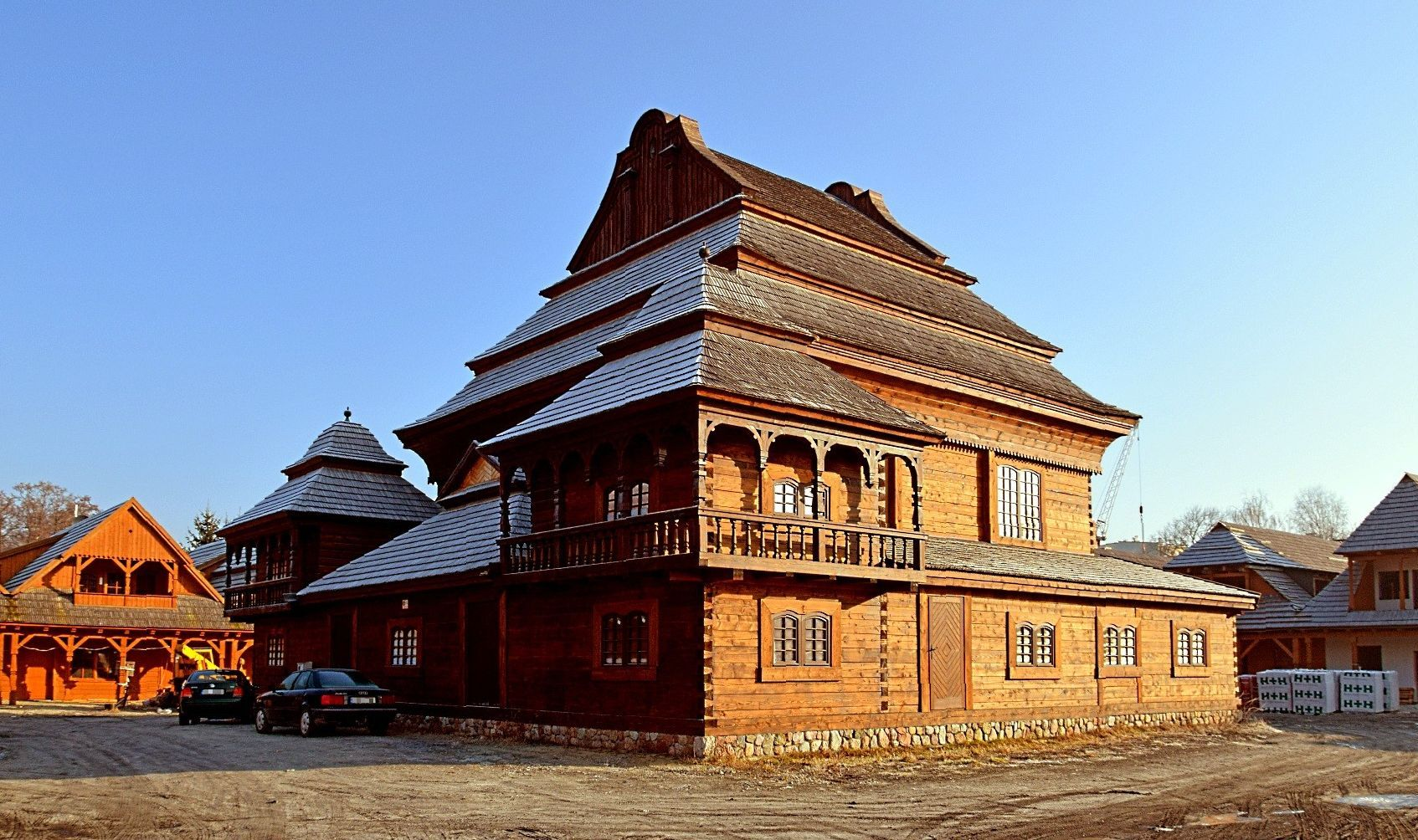
Replica in Biłgoraj, Poland

The main hall was 13 by 12.8 metres (43 by 42 ft) with a vaulted ceiling described as having been "the most magnificent of all known wooden ceilings" in Europe. Of course, since Christians were free to build with brick and stone, few European buildings of the scale of the Wolpa synagogue were ever built in wood. The walls of the main hall were 7.2 meters high. The vaulting, under a three-tiered roof, rose to a height of fourteen meters in three tiers marked by fancy balustrades. Each tier was made up of several curving sections faced in wooden paneling to form a graceful, tiered and vaulted dome. The vaulted ceiling was supported by the four wooden corner columns that rose from the bimah, and by trusses in the roof.

The Torah Ark was an elaborate, multi-tiered confection in painted, carved wood, with columns, bas-relief menorahs, vases, floral swags, roofed towers, the tablets of the Ten Commandments and an eagle.

In the early nineteenth century, the vaulted ceiling was painted in a "dark sapphire" color spangled with "glistening" gold stars. The walls were painted in naive Trompe-l'œil style to resemble a Classical masonry building. Polish Jewish communities were routinely denied permission to build in masonry.

The exterior featured a three-tiered roof and a pair of elaborate corner pavilions with two-tiered roofs over elaborate vaulted ceilings.

In 1997, the Yiddish Book Center on the campus of Hampshire College in Amherst, Massachusetts, the world's largest repository of Yiddish books and literature, chose to model its building on existing photographs of the Wolpa Synagogue.

In 2015, an exact replica of Wolpa Synagogue was built in Biłgoraj, Poland.

In 2024, the VR reconstruction of the Wolpa Synagogue was released by the Belarusian-Jewish Cultural Heritage Center. The project features hand-restored paintings based on extensive academic research. The virtual reconstruction includes two versions of the interior: before and after renovation in 1920s, and shows a 360-degree view of the present-day location.

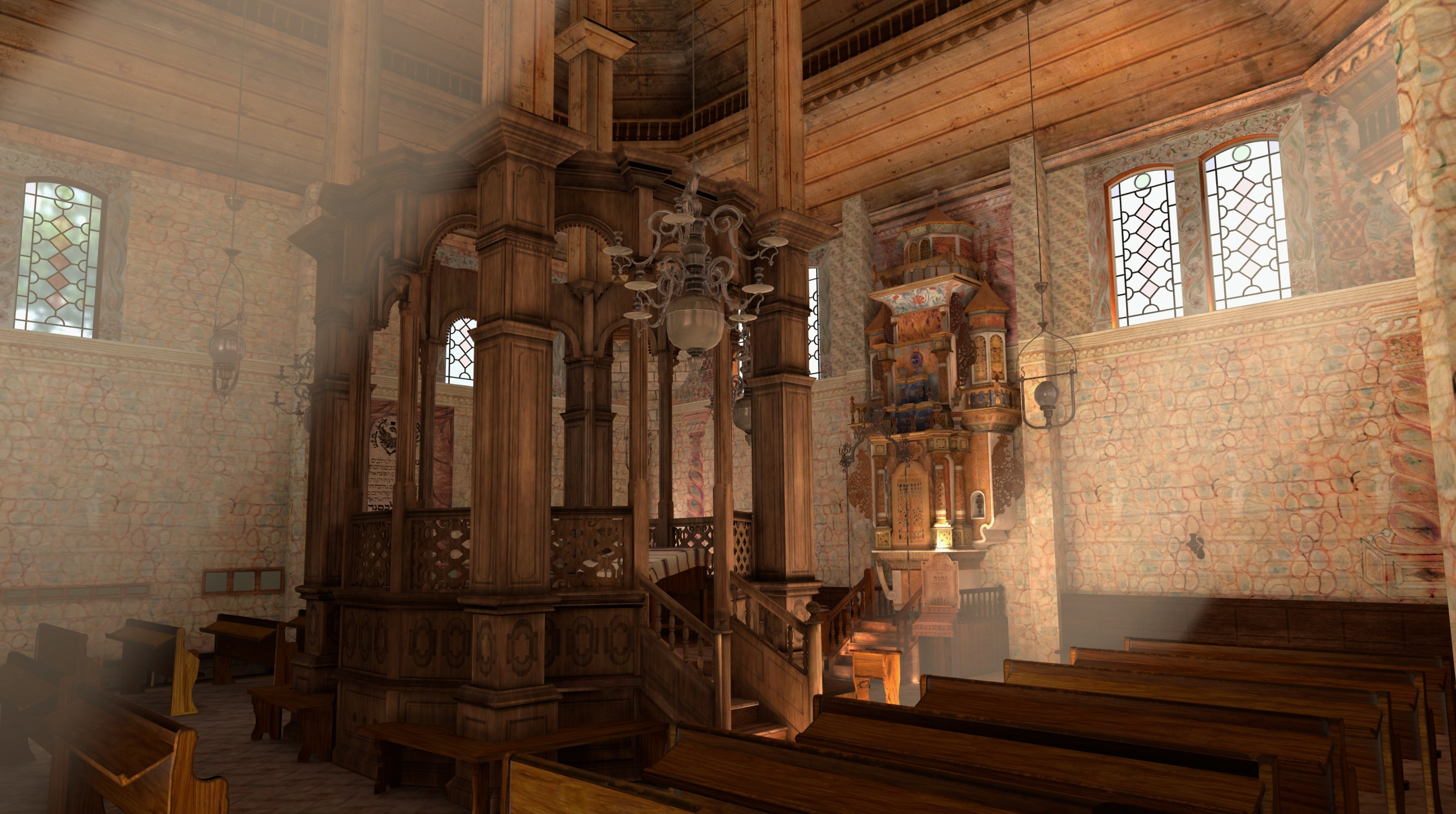
Virtual reconstruction of the Wolpa synagogue. Belarusian-Jewish Cultural Heritage Center
