= Synagogue of Alanta =

Former Orthodox synagogue in Alanta, Lithuania

- Lithuanian: Alantos sinagoga
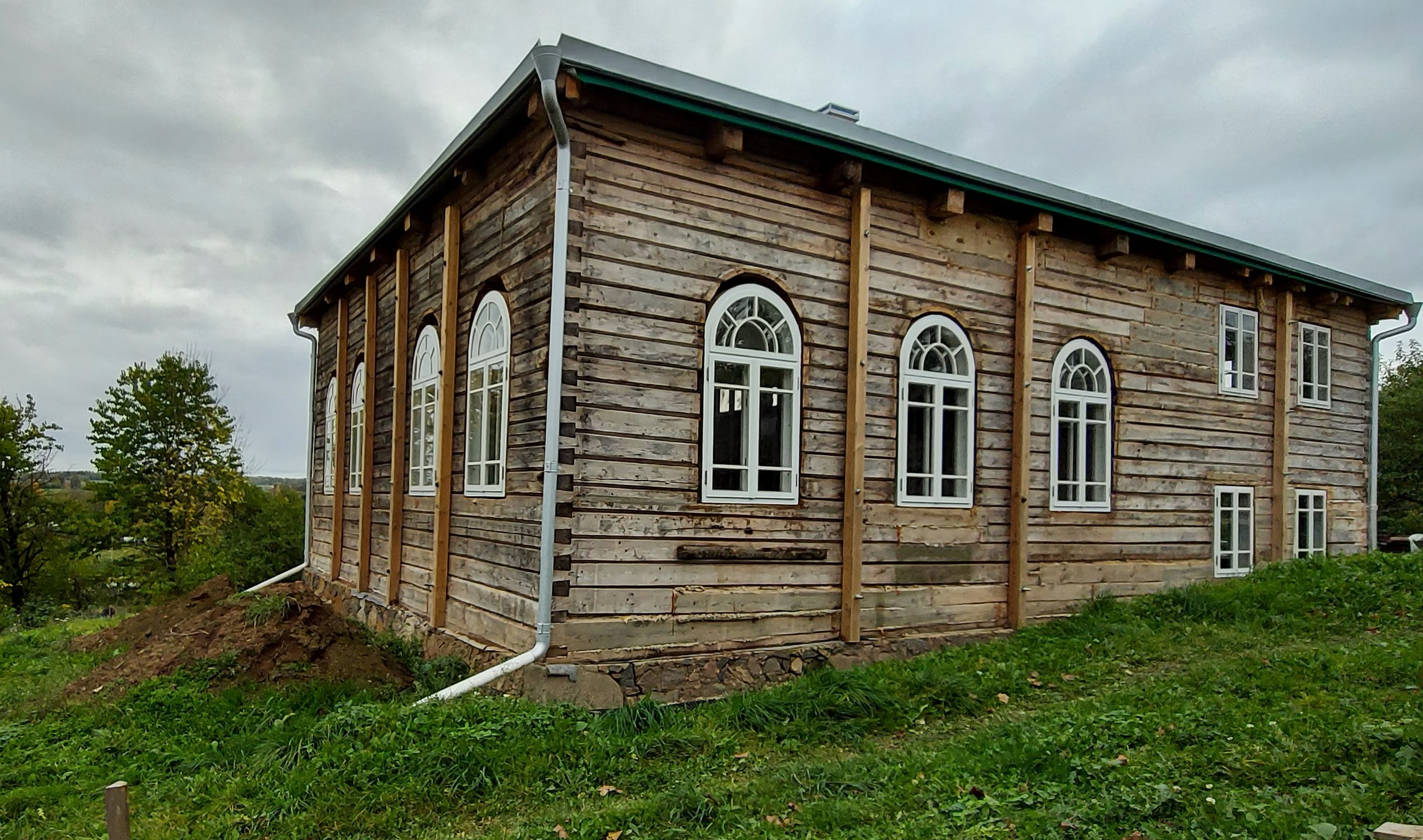
- The former synagogue in 2020

- Location of the former synagogue in Lithuania

Religion
- Affiliation: Judaism (former)
- Rite: Nusach Ashkenaz
- Ecclesiastical or organizational status: Synagogue (c. 1850s–1941); Profane use (1941–1990); Cultural center (since 2021)
- Status: Inactive (as a synagogue); Repurposed

Location
- Location: 3a Ukmergės Street, Alanta, Molėtai District Municipality, Utena County
- Country: Lithuania
- Interactive map of Synagogue of Alanta
- Coordinates: 55°20′45″N 25°17′42″E

Architecture
- Type: Wooden synagogue
- Style: Romantic
- Completed: c. 1850s
- Materials: Timber

The Synagogue of Alanta (Lithuanian: Alantos sinagoga) is a former Jewish congregation and synagogue, located at 3a Ukmergės Street, in Alanta, in the Molėtai District Municipality, in the Utena County of Lithuania. A wooden synagogue that was designed in the Romantic style, the building operated as a synagogue from the mid-19th century until it was devastated by Nazis in 1941. Subsequently used for profane purposes, the building was restored during 2021 and now operates as a cultural center.

The Alanta synagogue is one of 17 former wooden synagogues remaining in Lithuania.

== Structure ==
The synagogue is a wooden log structure of rectangular plan, built on a rough-stone concrete foundation and divided into two floors in the west. The structure is spanned with a hipped rafter roof covered with tin. On the exterior, the building is protected with horizontal weather-boarding above the windowsills of the prayer hall, and a vertical one below them. A prayer hall of almost square plan is situated on the eastern side. On the western side, the building includes a vestibule and a small room with a stove, which also heated the prayer hall. A staircase in the southwestern corner leads to a women's section on the first floor, which opens to the prayer hall with two long rectangular windows. The main entrance to the building is in the western wall and the women's entrance is on the southern wall. Ten round-headed windows opened from the prayer hall: three windows on the southern and northern walls and two pairs of windows on the eastern wall. The windows of the vestibule and the women's section are rectangular. The ceilings are joisted flat constructions; that of the prayer hall is supported by two large beams, resting on the western wall of the women's section and the eastern wall of the prayer hall.

== History ==
Built in second half of 19th century, the building operated as synagogue until 1941. After World War II it was used as grain warehouse. After Lithuanian Independence the building was returned to Lithuanian Jewish community and synagogue listed as protected building.

Rabbi Benjamin Gittelshon served as the rabbi.

Neither a bimah (presumably at the center), nor a Torah ark (presumably at the eastern wall) has survived.

In 2015 emergency repair works was carried out. Reconstruction works commenced in 2020 and were completed in 2021.

== See also ==
- History of the Jews in Lithuania
- Lithuanian Jews
