= Wooden synagogues in the Polish–Lithuanian Commonwealth =

Style of synagogue in the former Polish-Lithuanian Commonwealth

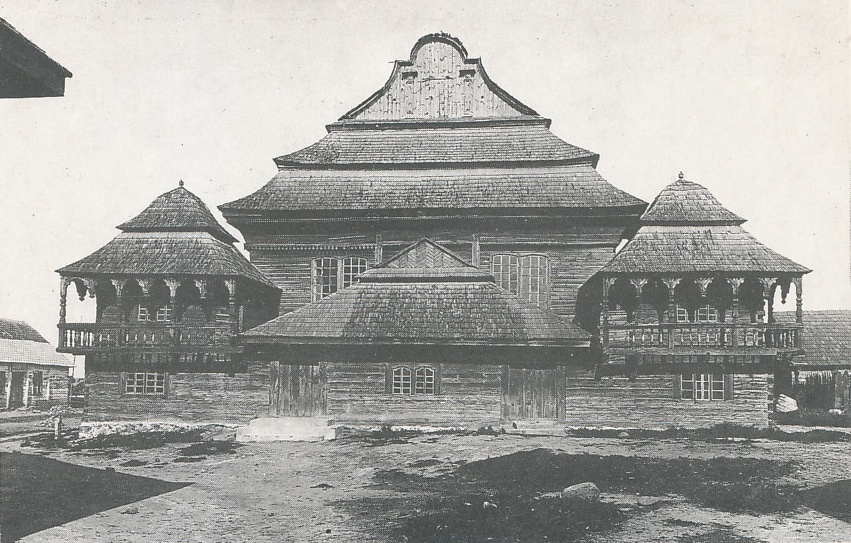
Wolpa Synagogue

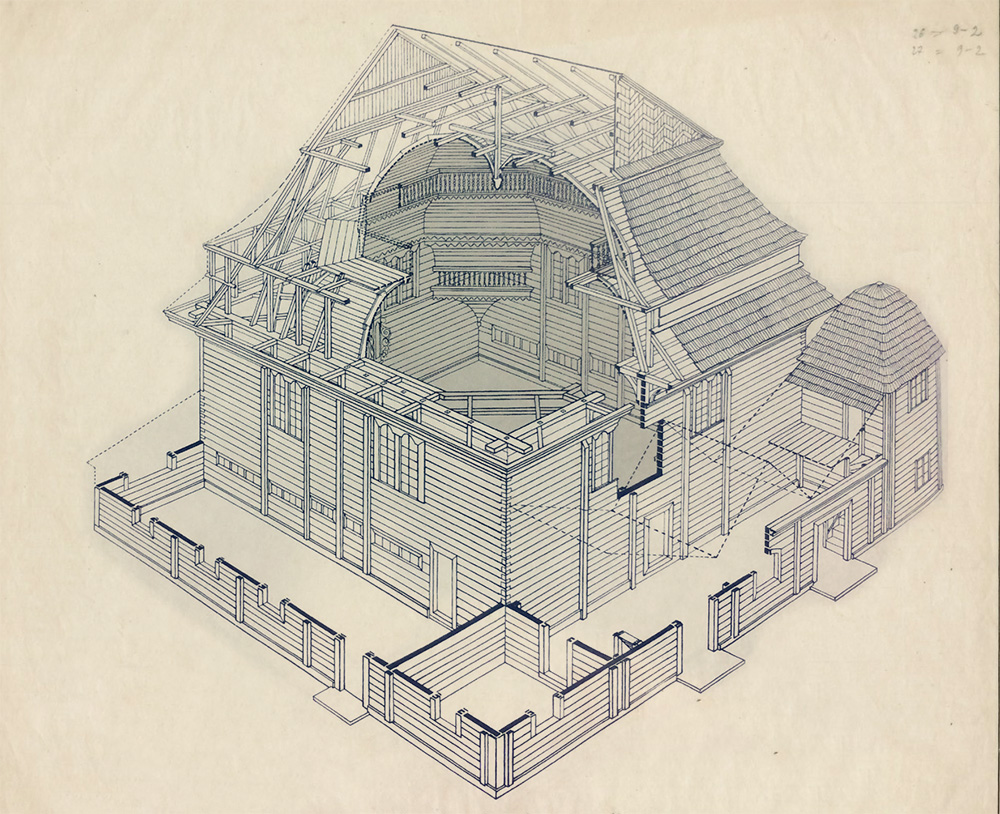
Cross section of a wooden synagogue

Wooden synagogues are an original style of vernacular synagogue architecture that emerged in the former Polish–Lithuanian Commonwealth. The style developed between the mid-16th and mid-17th centuries, a period of peace and prosperity for the Polish-Lithuanian Jewish community. While many were destroyed during the First and Second World Wars, there are some that survive today in Lithuania.

== History ==
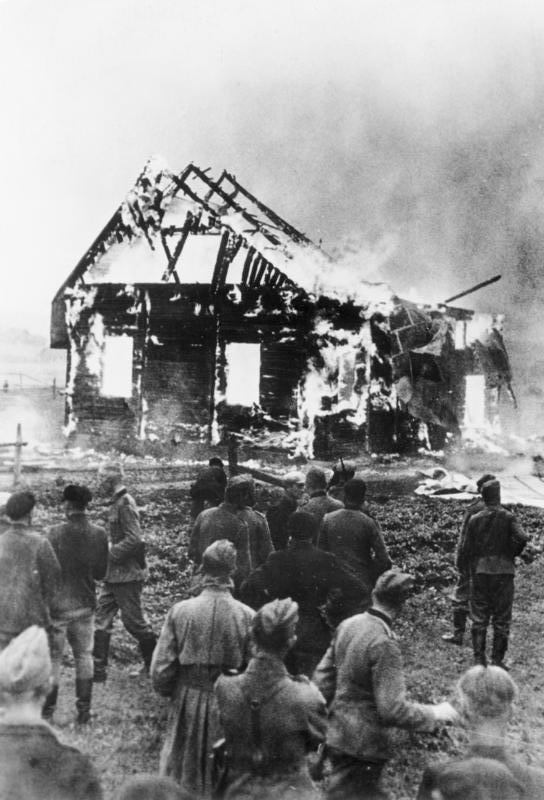
German soldiers observe burning wooden synagogue in Lithuania during World War II.

According to Maria and Kazimierz Piechotka, wooden synagogues in Poland–Lithuania developed during the Renaissance, sometime from the mid-16th to mid-17th century. This period was described as a time of peace and prosperity for the Jewish community of the vast Polish–Lithuanian Commonwealth, which at its peak occupied much of Central and Eastern Europe. The style was particularly common in the eastern territories of the Commonwealth which now constitute Lithuania, Belarus and Ukraine. Moreover, such synagogues were predominantly found in smaller townships, villages and shtetls rather than larger cities.

Timber was abundant and inexpensive in the heavily forested Commonwealth, but a large part of the motivation for building in wood rather than stone or brick was the great difficulty of obtaining government permission to erect masonry synagogues. The wooden synagogues, which featured multi-layered high roofs, multi-beamed domes, galleries, wooden balconies and arches were built to high standards of craftsmanship.

The synagogues fell victim to obsolescence and neglect over the next centuries. During the Second World War, the Germans burned and destroyed nearly all of the wooden synagogues that were still standing. None remain in Poland today, however, some did survive in Lithuania.

== Uniqueness as an artistic and architectural form ==
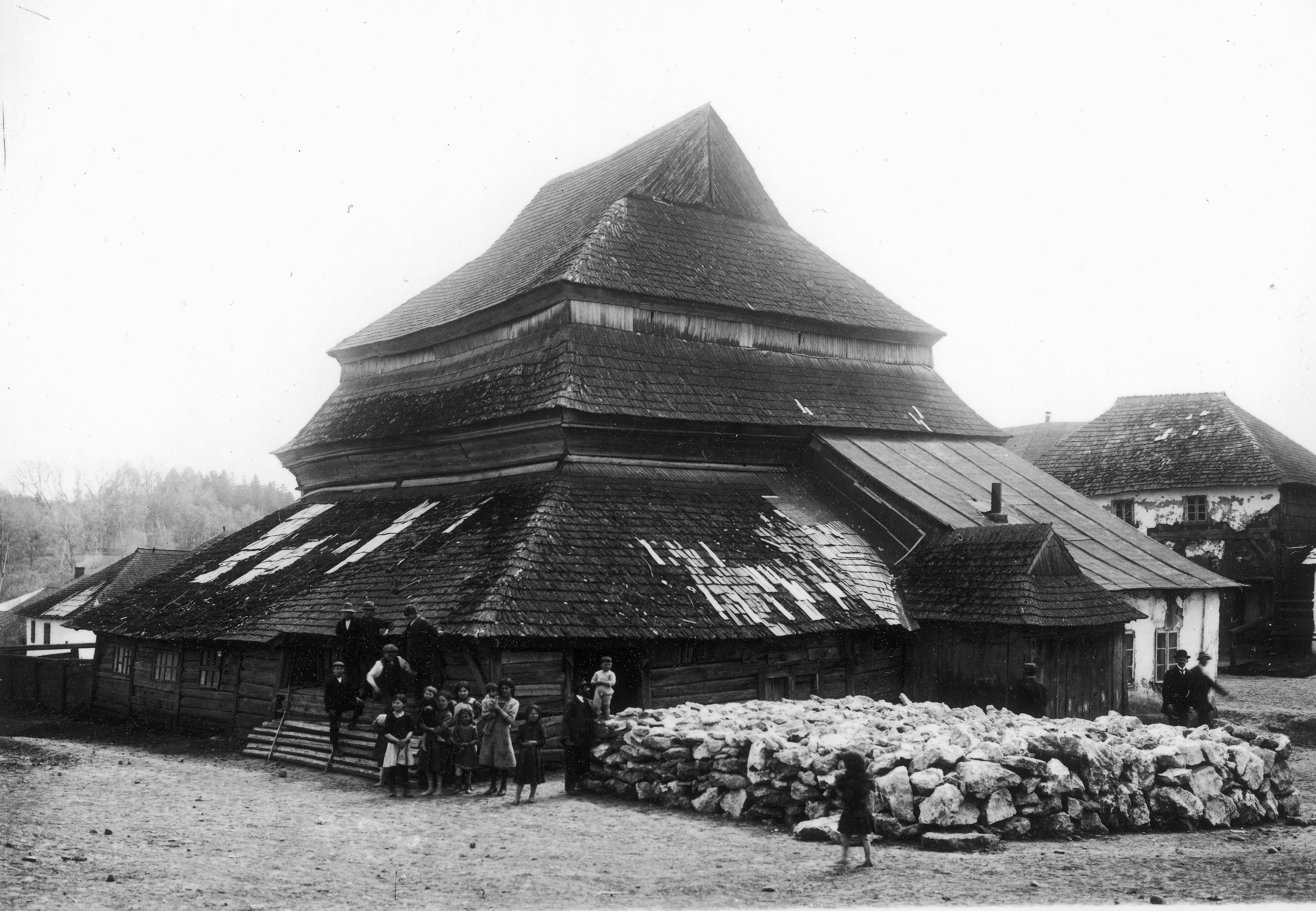
Gwoździec Synagogue

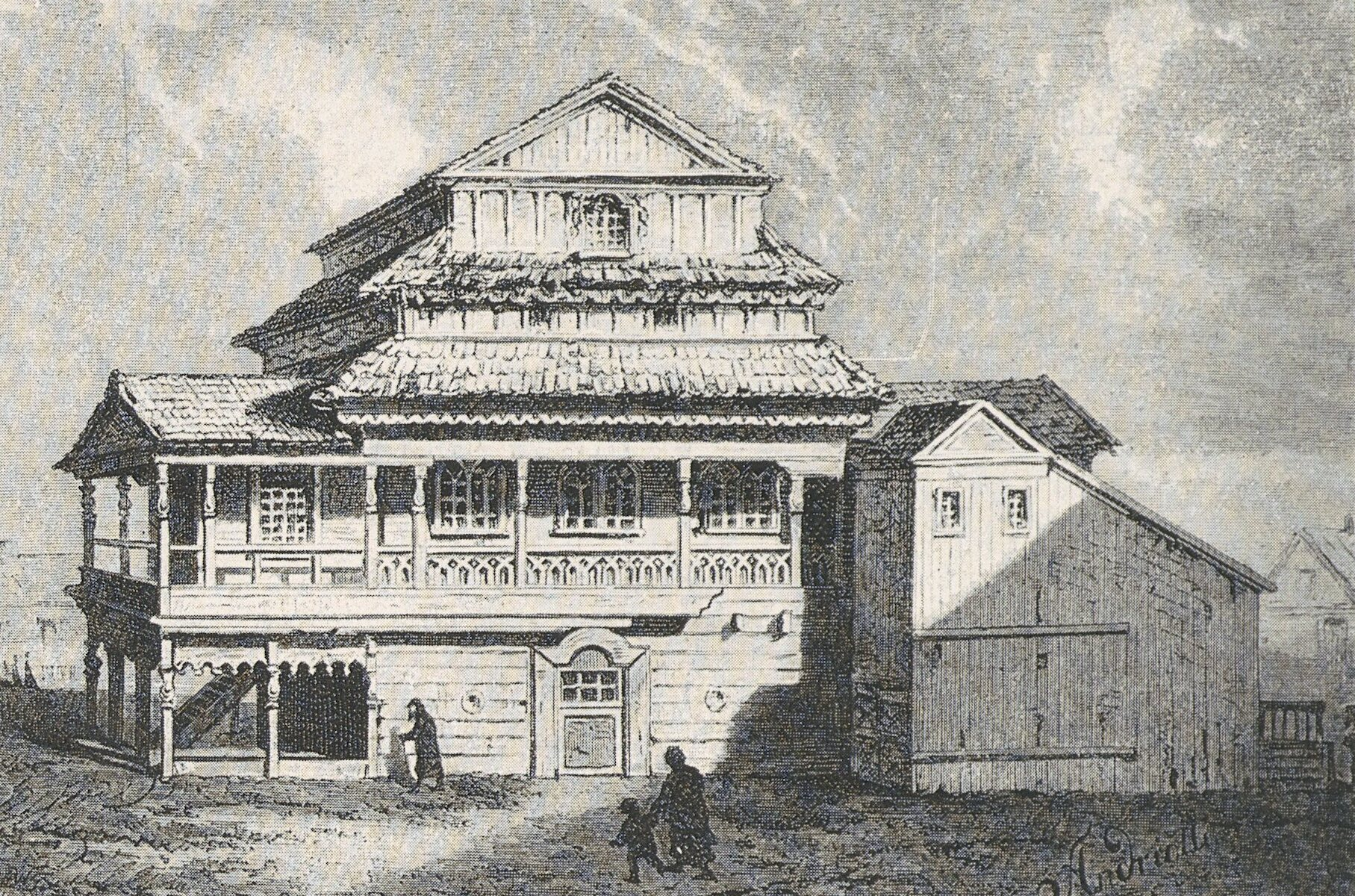
Wooden synagogue in Jurbarkas

The wooden synagogue was "an original architectural genre" that drew on several models, including Poland's wooden building traditions and central plan, masonry synagogues in which four massive masonry pillars that define the Bimah rise to support the roof vaulting. Central pillars support the vaulting of only a handful of wooden synagogues. Instead, in wooden synagogues the vaulting and domes are suspended by elaborate roof trusses. Common features shared by wooden synagogues include the independence of the pitched roof from the design of the interior domed ceiling. The outside of a wooden synagogue gave no hint of the domes and multiple, Baroque vaults that would be found within. The exteriors were decidedly plain, giving no hint of the riot of carving, painting, domes, balconies and vaulting inside. The architectural interest of the exterior lay in the large scale of the buildings, the multiple, horizontal lines of the tiered roofs, and the carved corbels that supported them. The elaborate domed and vaulted ceilings were known as raki'a (Hebrew for sky or firmament) and were often painted blue sprinkled with stars. The Bimah was always placed in the center of the room. Wooden synagogues featured a single, large hall. In contrast to contemporary churches, there was no apse. Moreover, while contemporary churches featured imposing vestibules, the entry porches of the wooden synagogues was a low annex, usually with a simple lean-to roof. In these synagogues, the emphasis was on constructing a single, large, high-domed worship space.

According to art historian Stephen S. Kayser, the wooden synagogues of Poland with their painted and carved interiors were "a truly original and organic manifestation of artistic expression—the only real Jewish folk art in history".

According to Louis Lozowick, writing in 1947, the wooden synagogues were unique because, unlike all previous synagogues, they were not built in the architectural style of their region and era, but in a newly evolved and uniquely Jewish style, making them "a truly original folk expression", whose "originality does not lie alone in the exterior architecture, it lies equally in the beautiful and intricate wood carving of the interior".

Moreover, while in many parts of the world Jews were proscribed from entering the building trades and even from practicing the decorative arts of painting and woodcarving, the wooden synagogues were actually built by Jewish craftsmen. Other research points to certain synagogues being made by Christian master builders. For example, the early history of the Gwoździec Synagogue is unknown and portions of the structure date back to 1650. The original structure was built in a regional style exhibiting both Jewish and Polish vernacular architecture. In the 18th century there was a dramatic reconfiguration of the prayer hall ceiling. It is believed to be the first cupola of its kind. The timber framers are unknown but presumed to be Christian master builders since until the 19th century Jews were excluded from the trade. The liturgical paintings were made by Jewish artists. Isaac, son of Rabbi Judah Leib ha Cohen and Israel, son of Rabbi Mordecai, have inscribed their names on the paintings in the western ceiling.

The interior vaulting of the Wolpa Synagogue is described by art historians Maria and Kazimierz Piechotka as having been "the most magnificent of all known wooden ceilings" in Europe. Of course, since Christians were free to build with brick and stone, few European buildings of the scale of the Wolpa synagogue were ever built in wood. The walls of the main hall were 7.2 meters high. The vaulting, under a three-tiered roof, rose to a height of fourteen meters in three tiers marked by fancy balustrades. Each tier was made up of several curving sections faced in wooden paneling to form a graceful, tiered and vaulted dome. The vaulted ceiling was supported by the four wooden corner columns that rose form the bimah, and by trusses in the roof.

Art historian Ori Z. Soltes points out that the wooden synagogues, unusual for that period in being large, identifiably Jewish buildings not hidden in courtyards or behind walls, were built not only during a Jewish "intellectual golden age" but in a time and place where "the local Jewish population was equal to or even greater than the Christian population".

== Types of wooden synagogues ==
Wooden synagogues can be divided into three types by the plan of the building, according to an article by G.K. Lukomski.

- The first has a square plan and a pyramidal roof in one, two and even three stages with decorated cornices.
- The second type, oblong in shape, has a roof decorated with arcading.
- The third type, more simple, resembles Polish secular buildings used to store grain, hay, etc.

Wooden synagogues may also be divided into three groups according to the shape of the roof and the number of cornices which divide them into stages (of the Mansard type, called in Polish "podcienie"), i.e., roofs with one, two or three stages.

- The type with roofs of one stage with perceptibly curved and tilted eaves, are probably the oldest in date. This is a very simple construction resembling a secular building used for agricultural purposes rather than a religious temple - a barn or store-house for grain. Its construction is very logical, or rational; every beam, every pillar and every buttress is clearly visible.

Examples: synagogue at Lanckorona in Podolie; Polaniec; Pareczow; Orsza; Szkloff; Radoszyce; Pilica; Nowogradek; Przedborz; Zydaczew; Brzozdowice; Pieczenierzyn; Jablonow.

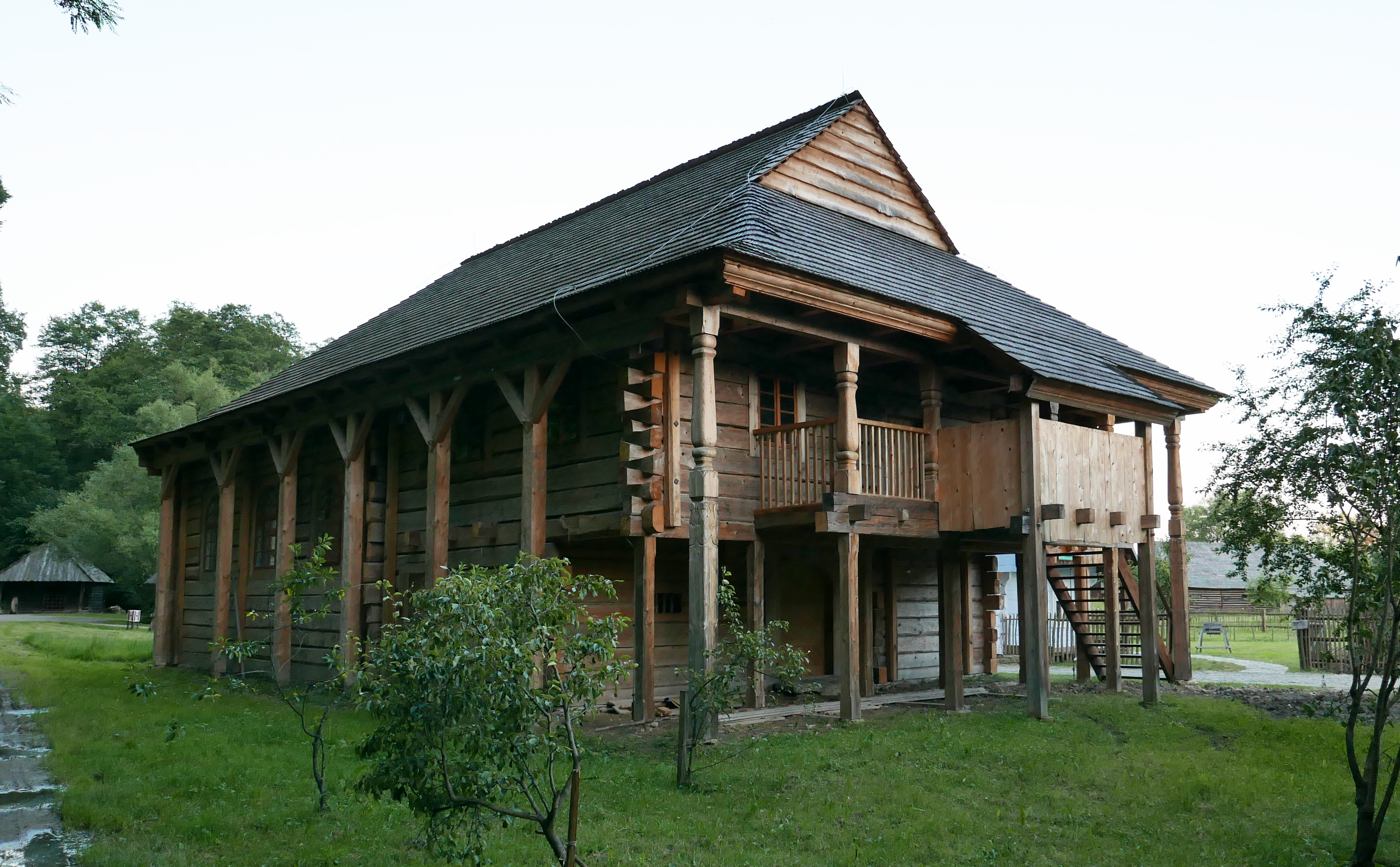
Polaniec

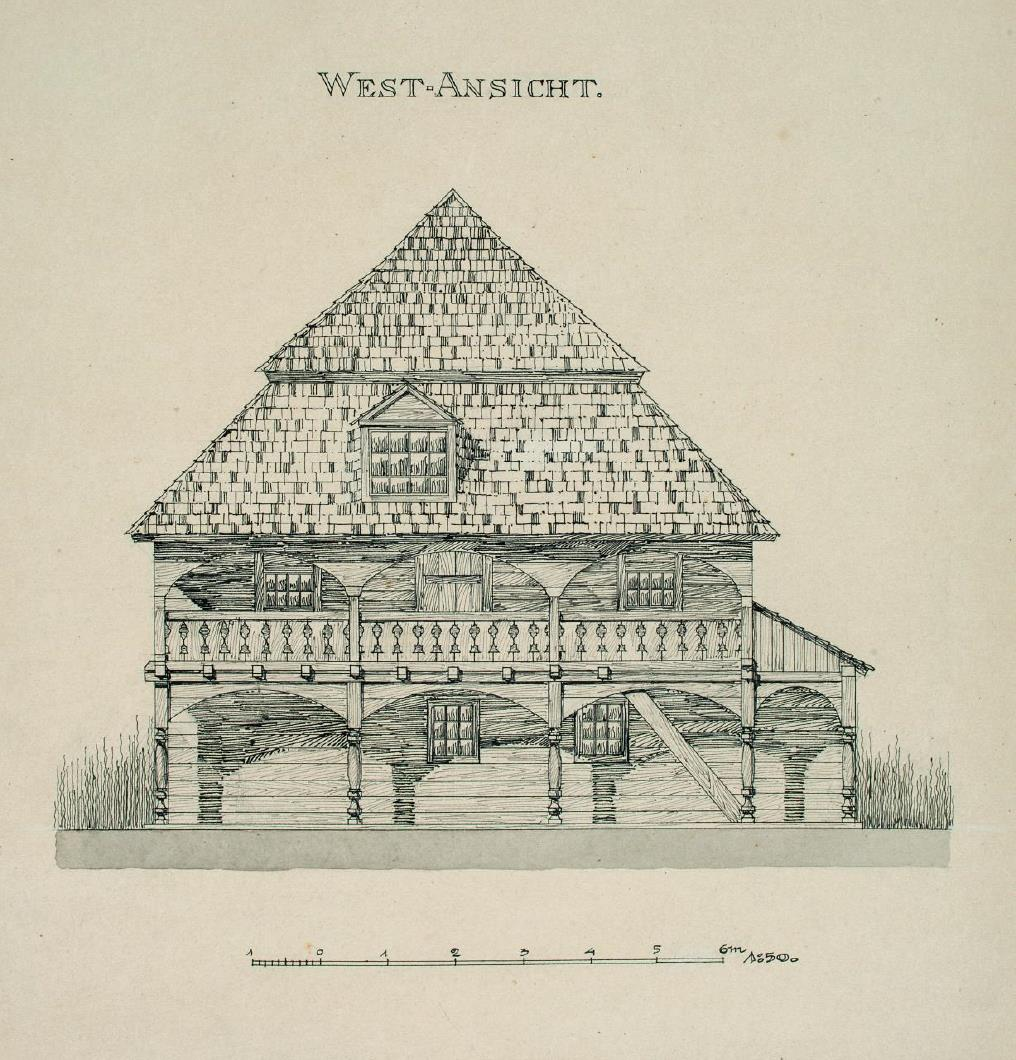
Peczenizyn

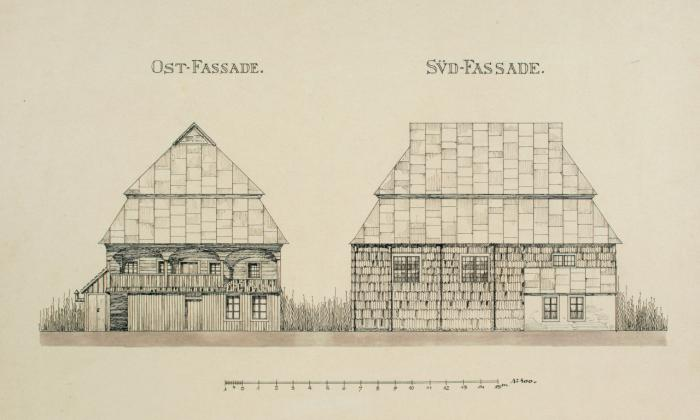
Jabłonów
- The type with two roofs are often very large. It is interesting to note that the facades of the two towers can differ in design. A characteristic detail is the covering of the walls with narrow planks which act as an outer lining.

Examples: Gwozdziec; Grodno; Chodorow; Uzlany (Usljany); Kamyenyets; Nasielsk; Njaswisch; Mogilev.

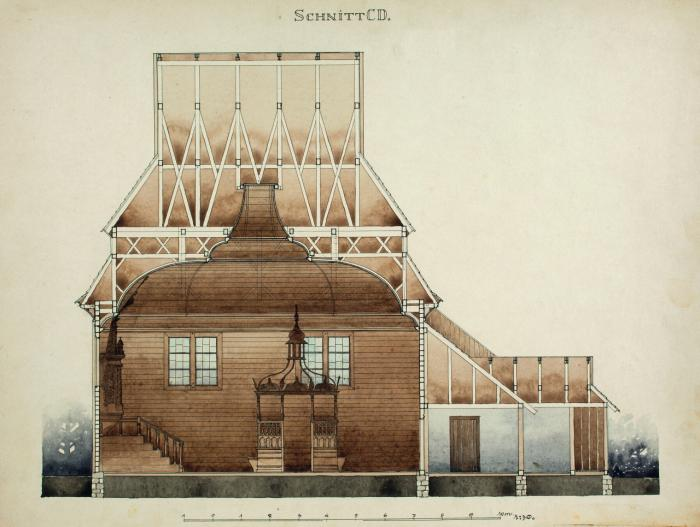
Gwoździec

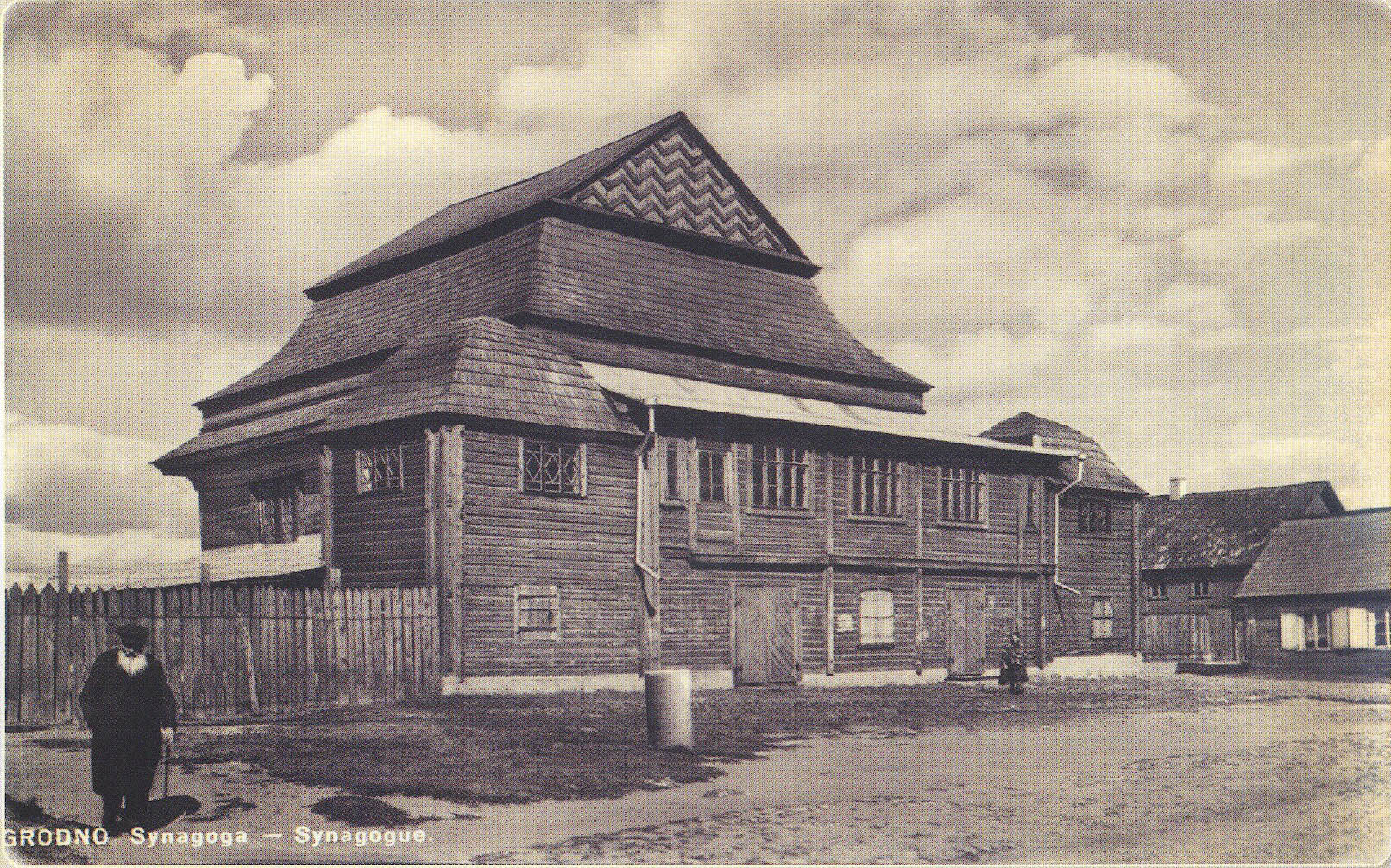
Grodno

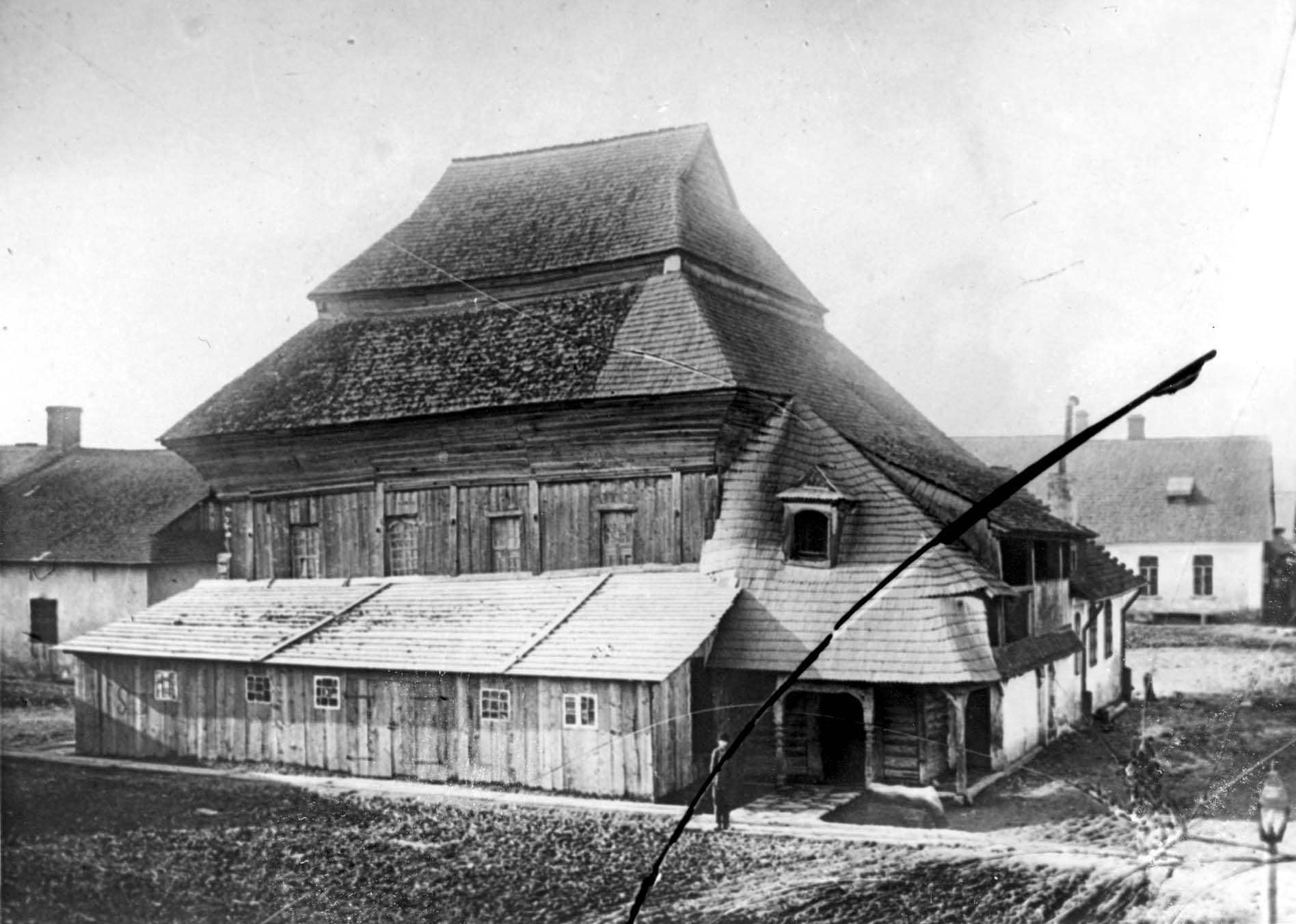
Chodorow

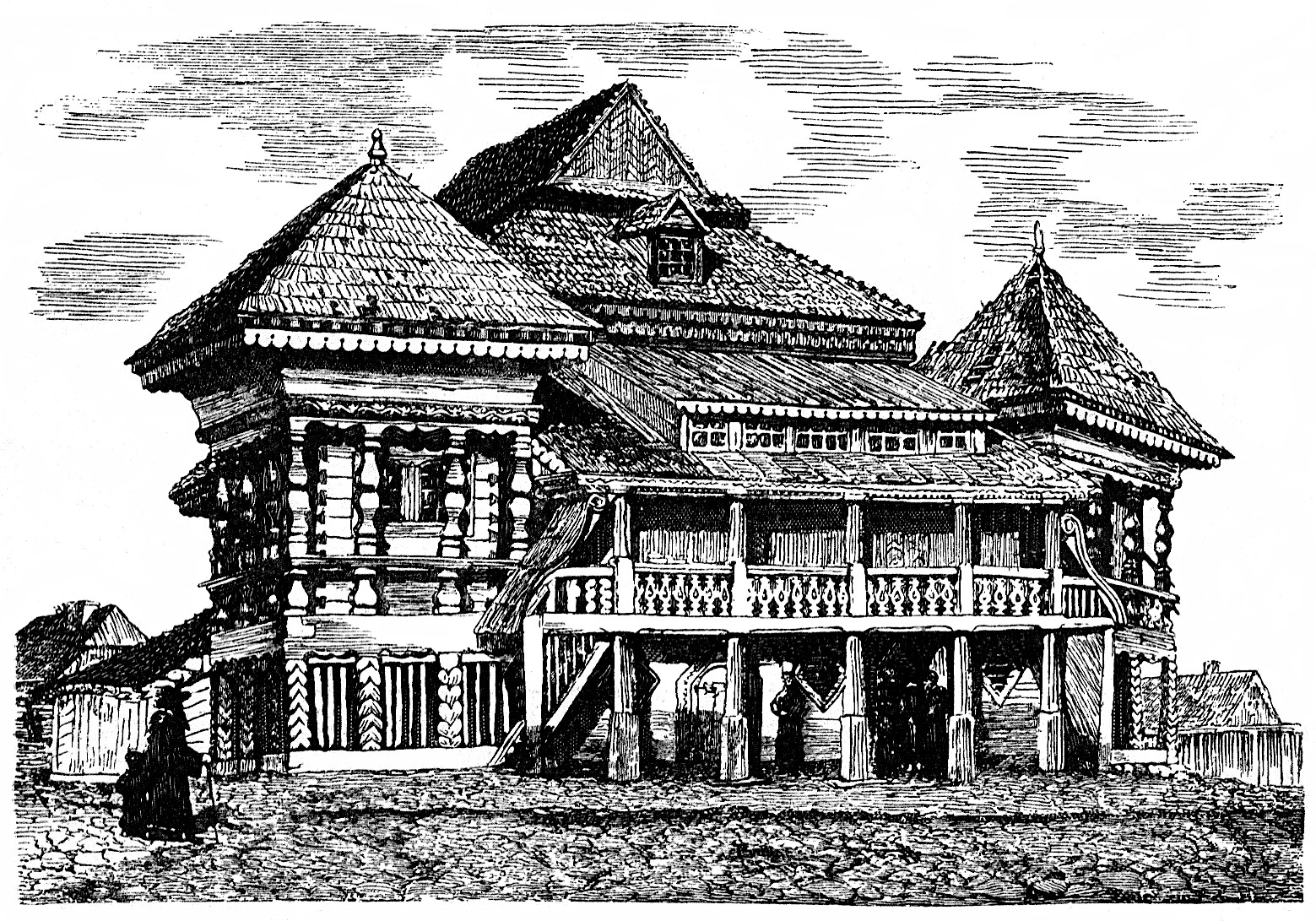
Nasielsk

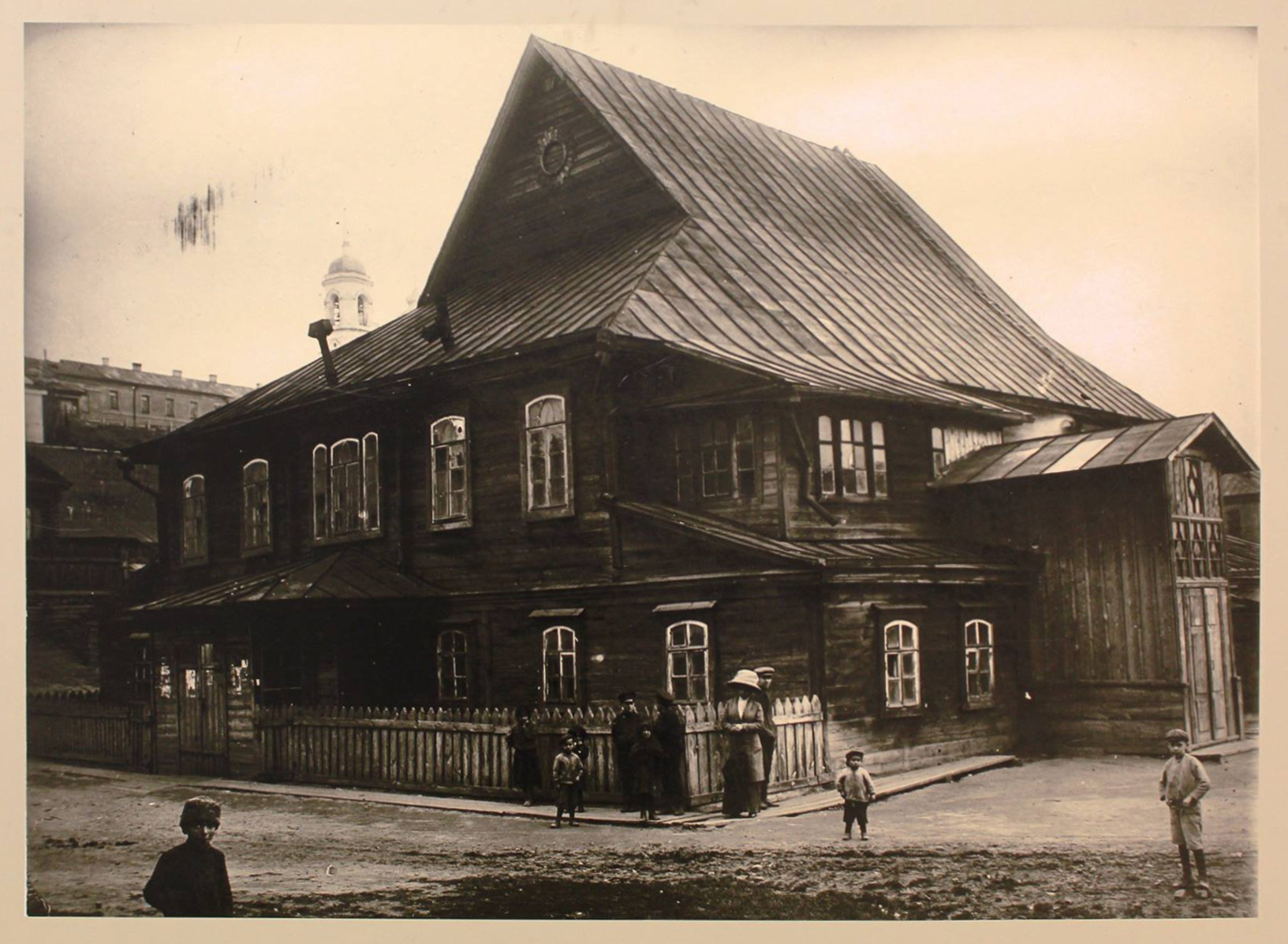
Mogilev
- The type with three stages or more.

Examples: Nowe-Miasto; Pohrebyszcze; Jedwabne; Narowla; Wolpa; Zabłudów.

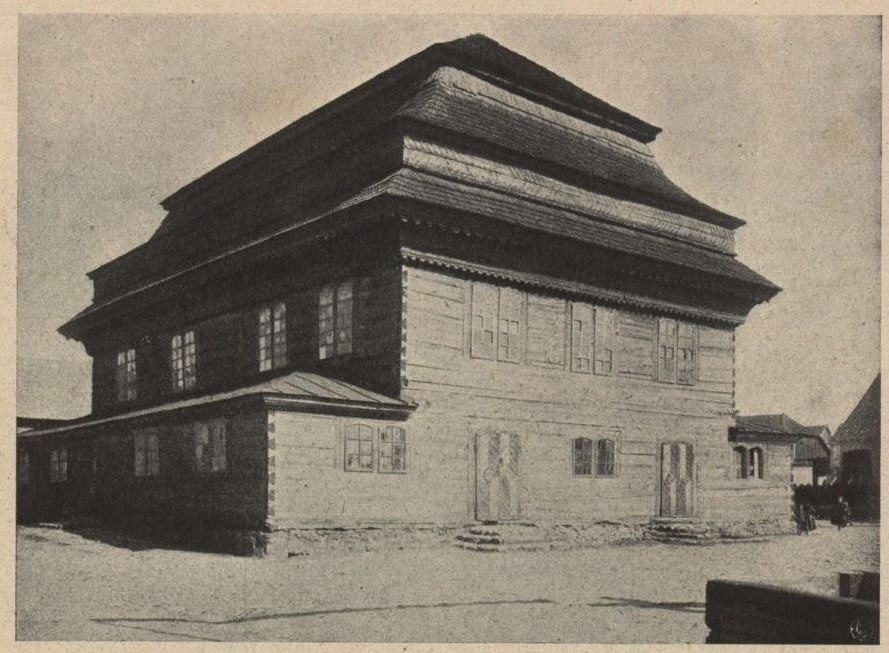
Jedwabne

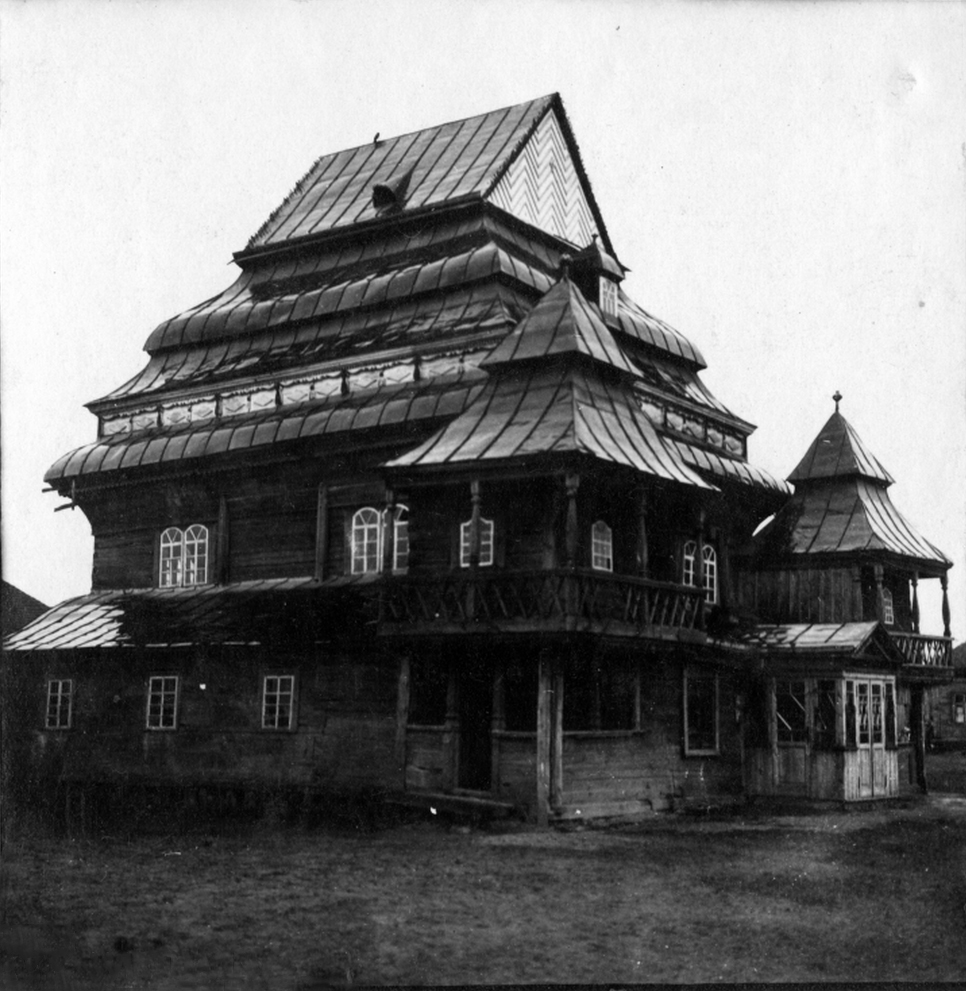
Narowla

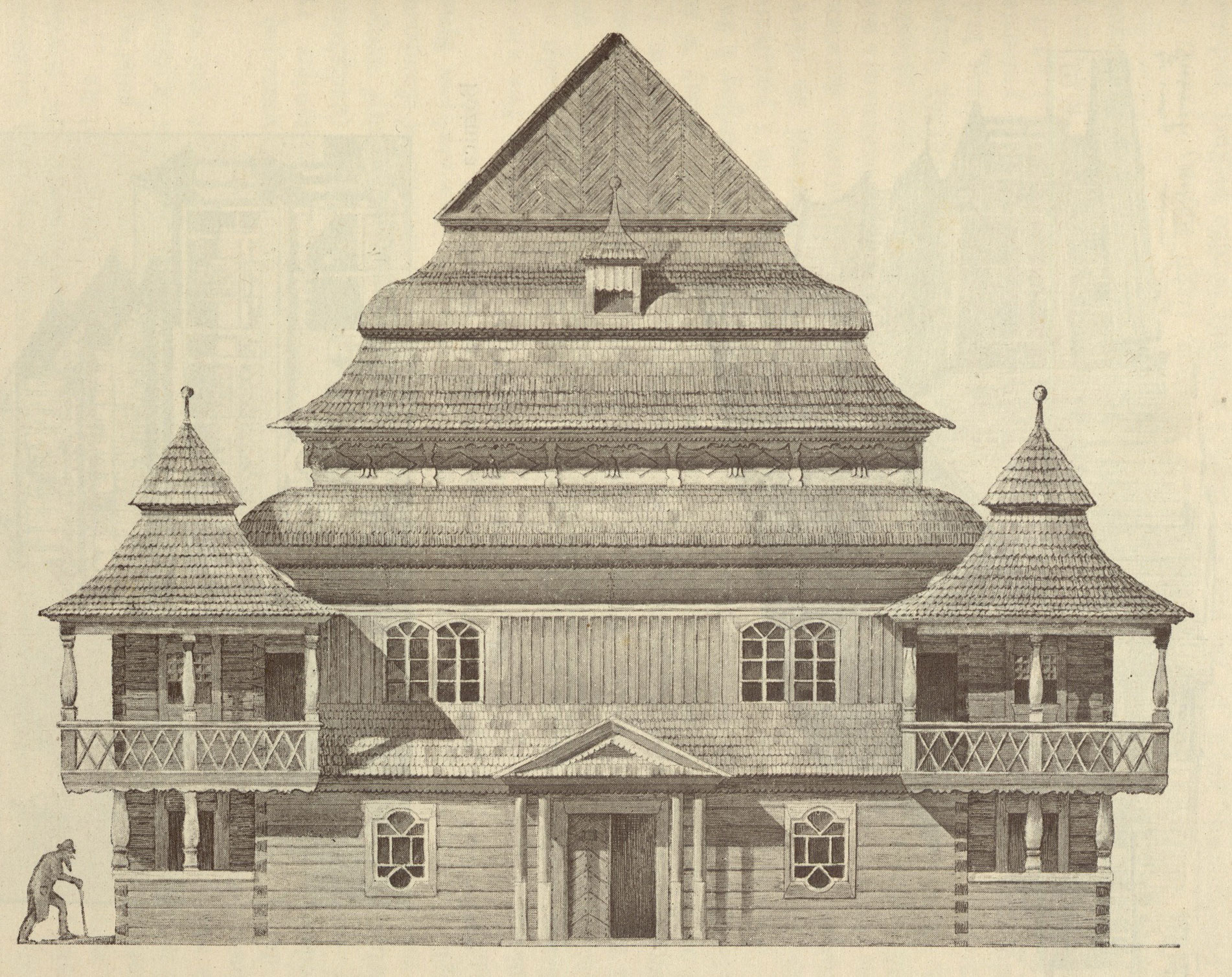
Narowla

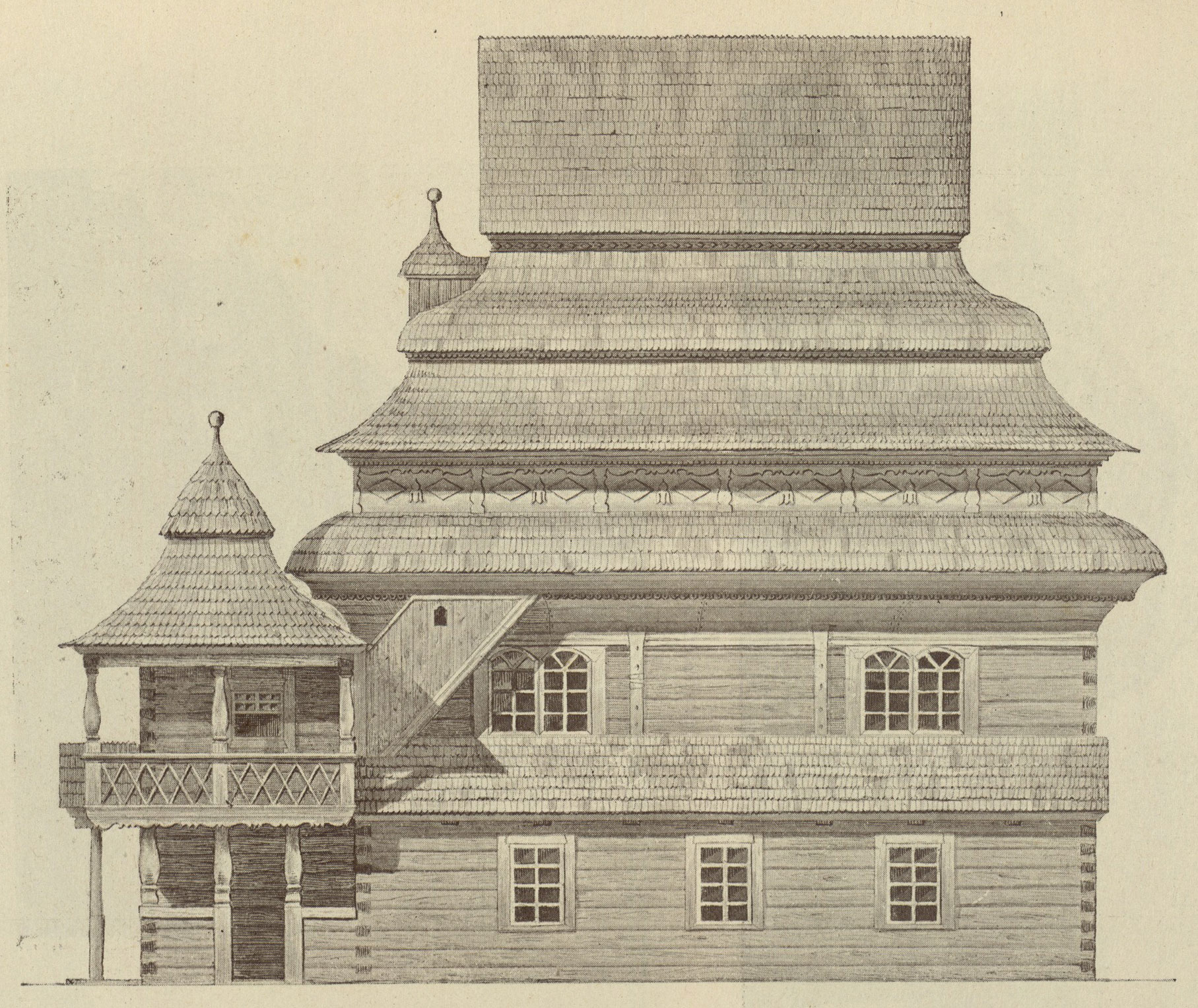
Narowla

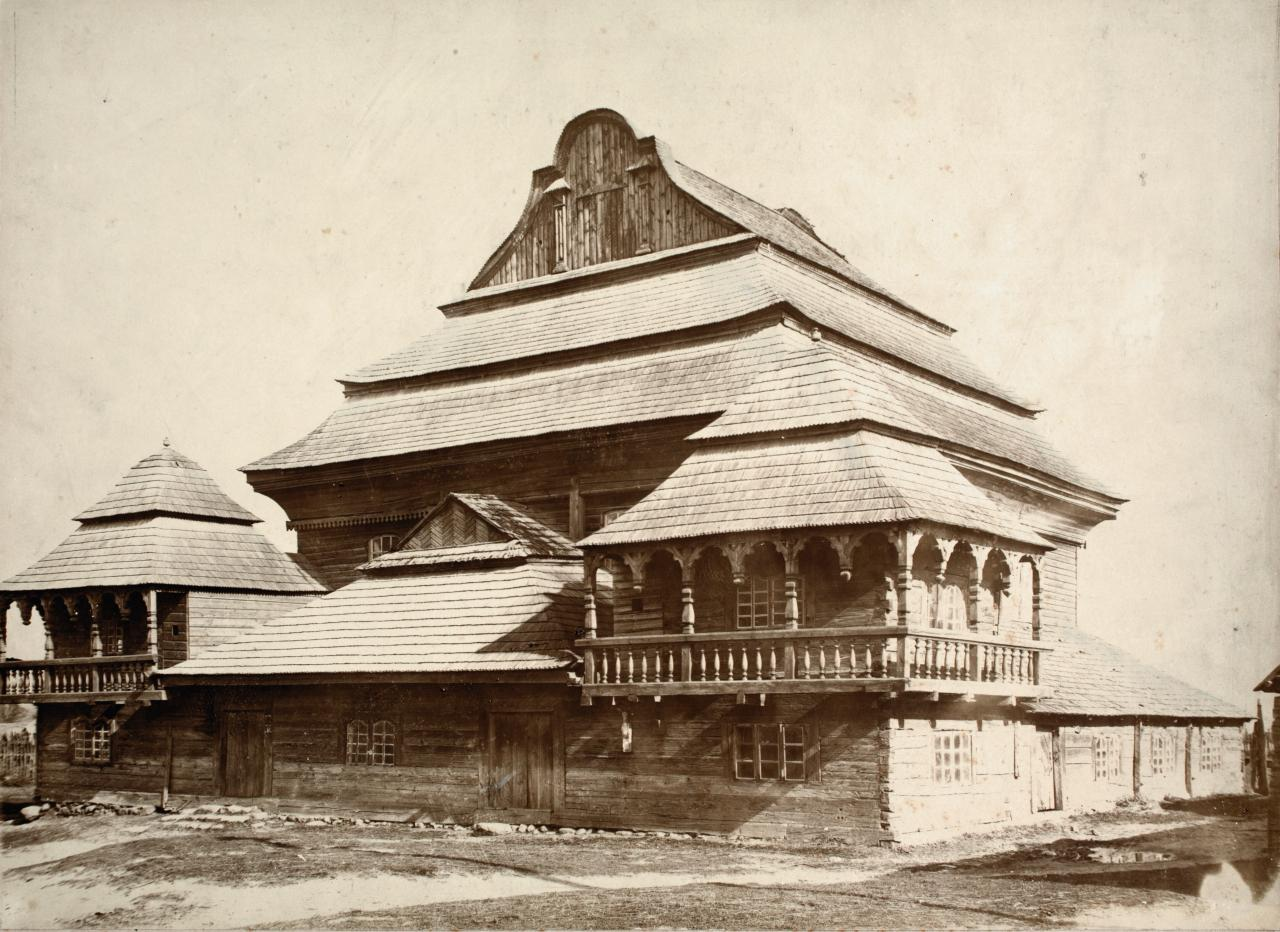
Wolpa

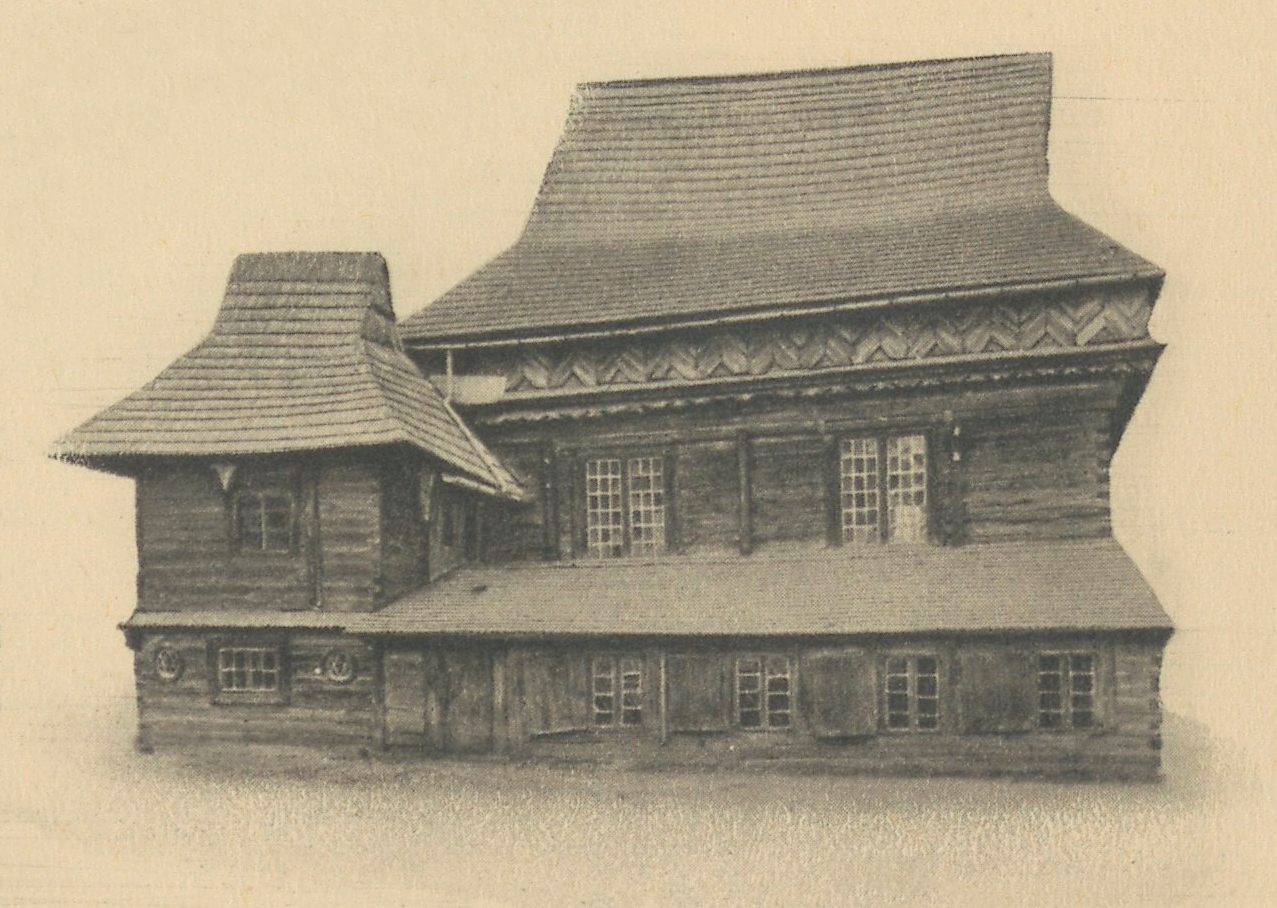
Zabłudów

== Interior decoration ==
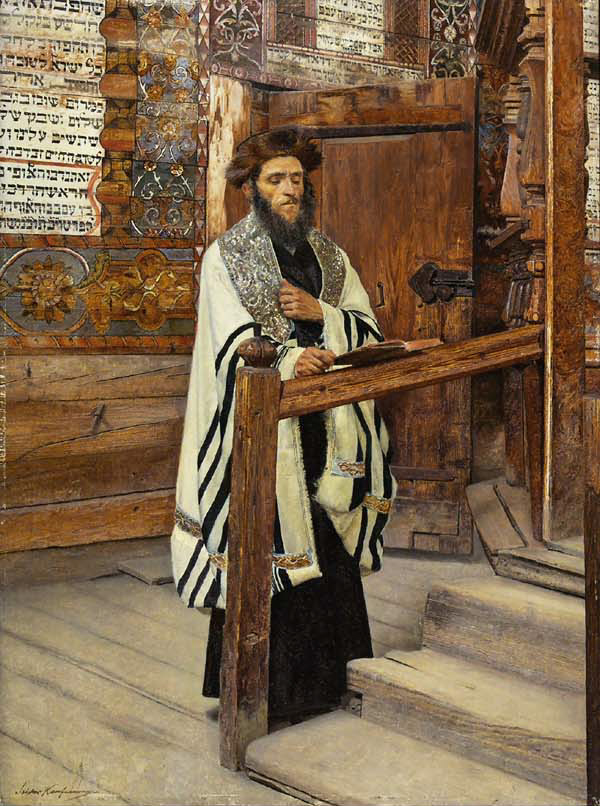
Isidor Kaufmann's painting Rabbi in wooden synagogue of Jabłonów, 1897

The interiors were decorated with wall and ceiling paintings that, in many cases, covered the walls and ceilings entirely, and with elaborately carved wooden Torah arks.

Thomas Hubka has traced the style of decorative painting in the wooden synagogues to the medieval Hebrew illuminated manuscripts of Ashkenazi Jewry.

The intricate wooden decoration of the barrel vaulted ceiling of the Przedbórz Synagogue was considered so beautiful that before the Second World War it drew tourists to the small village of Przedbórz.

== Regional variations ==
Architectural historian Rachel Wischnitzer has traced regional variations in wooden synagogue style. The interiors of the wooden synagogues of Lithuania were not as exuberantly painted as were synagogues of other regions. Instead, Lithuanian synagogues were notable for architectural details such as ceilings with the boards laid in decorative herringbone patterns. Several Lithuanian synagogues featured corner pavilions. The wooden synagogues of Galicia were notable for their elaborate wall paintings.

== Influence on art and architecture ==
- Frank Stella's Polish village series draws on images of Wooden synagogues published by Maria and Kazimierz Piechotka in their 1957 book, Wooden synagogues.
- The Sons of Israel Synagogue, by architects Davis, Brody and Wisniewski, in Lakewood, New Jersey evokes Polish wooden synagogues in modern materials in the shape of its roof.
- The Temple B'rith Kodesh in Rochester, New York, by architect Pietro Belluschi is roofed with a domed wooden drum intended to evoke the wooden synagogues of Poland.
- The modern building of Congregation Beth Shalom Rodfe Zedek in Chester, Connecticut was designed by artist Sol LeWitt who conceptualized the "airy" synagogue building with its shallow dome supported by "exuberant wooden roof beams" as a homage to the Wooden synagogues of eastern Europe.

== In culture ==
Wooden synagogues were quite abundant, and several famous authors and artists include them in their works.

Adam Mickiewicz gives detailed description of wooden synagogues in his epic poem Pan Tadeusz, Or, the Last Foray in Lithuania; a Story of Life Among Polish Gentlefolk in the Years 1811 and 1812, first published in 1834.

The new inn made an uninspired impression;
The old one had been built in ancient fashion
Dreamed up by the carpenters of Tyre, and then
Spread through the world by the Jews—a style unknown
To architects in any other place.
The Jews it was who brought it here to us.
It's shaped like a ship in front, a temple behind;
The ship part is a Noah's Ark on land,
Or, as the vulgar say, a barn—a house
For sundry creatures (horses, oxen, cows,
Billy goats); while flocks of poultry dwell upstairs
With crawling insects too, and snakes in pairs.
The oddly formed rear section brings to mind
The Temple of Solomon on the Mount, designed
By Hiram's carpenters—who for their part
Had been the first to learn the builder's art.
Synagogues still are built this way; in turn,
Their shape is seen in that of inn and barn.
A roof of thatch and unplaned boards juts high,
Like a ragged Jewish hat, into the sky.
Above are long rows of wooden galleries
On moldering pillars that are mysteries
Of architecture—leaning to one side
Like Pisa's famous tower, still they abide,
Shunning, in fact, the models of Ancient Greece
For the pillars lack both capital and base.
They're topped with arches (also made of wood),
Half-rounded, copying the Gothic mode,
Formed not with burin or with chisel, but by
The carpenter's ax, deployed most artfully.
They curve like the arms of sabbath candlesticks.
At the end are knobs, a little like the box
That Jews strap to their foreheads when they pray,
Called "tzitzit" in their tongue.

— Adam Mickiewicz, Pan Tadeusz, Book IV (1834)

Napoleon Orda, renowned Polish-Lithuanian artist, painted at least two wooden synagogues.

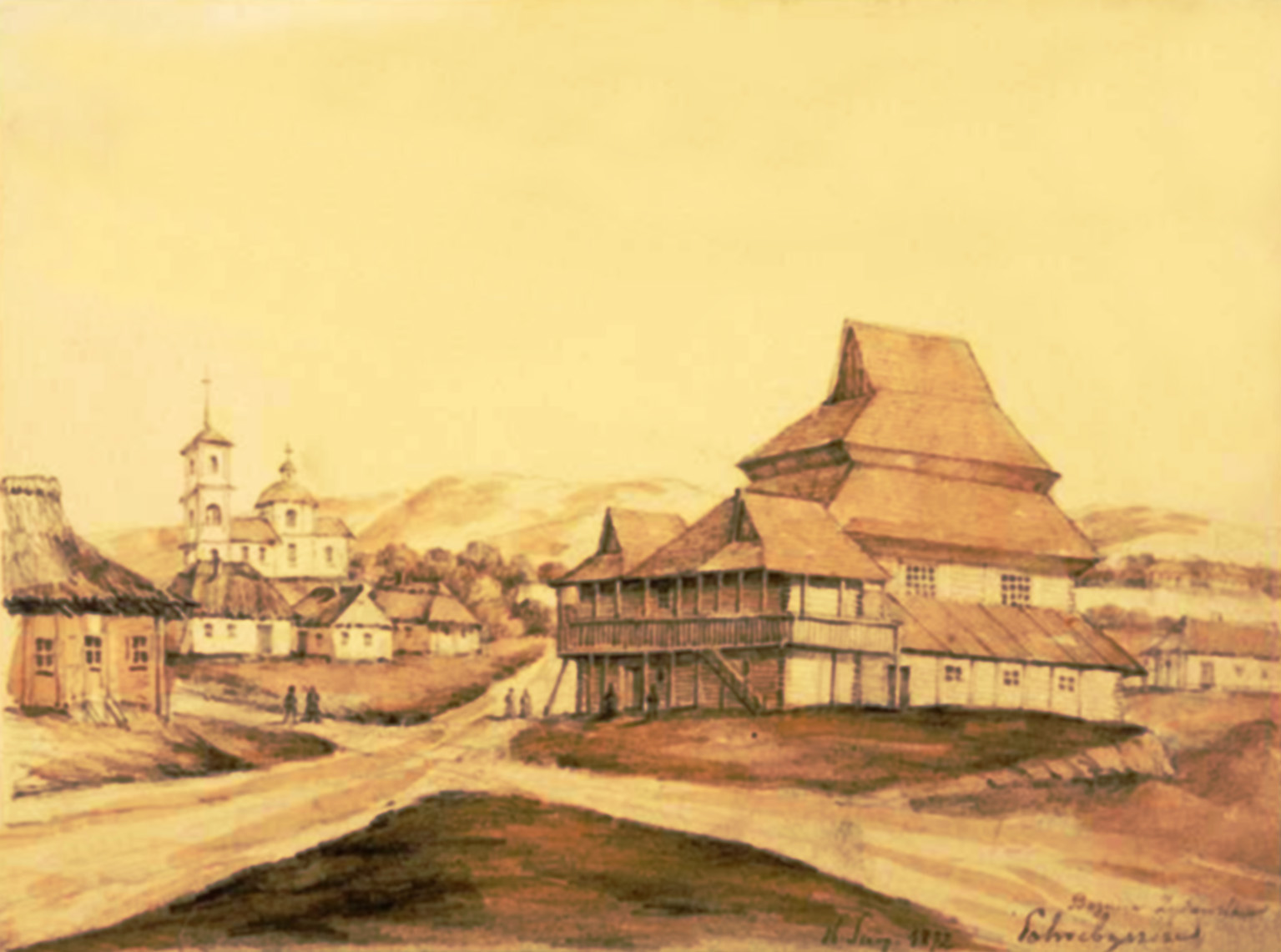
Pohrebyszcze, 1872

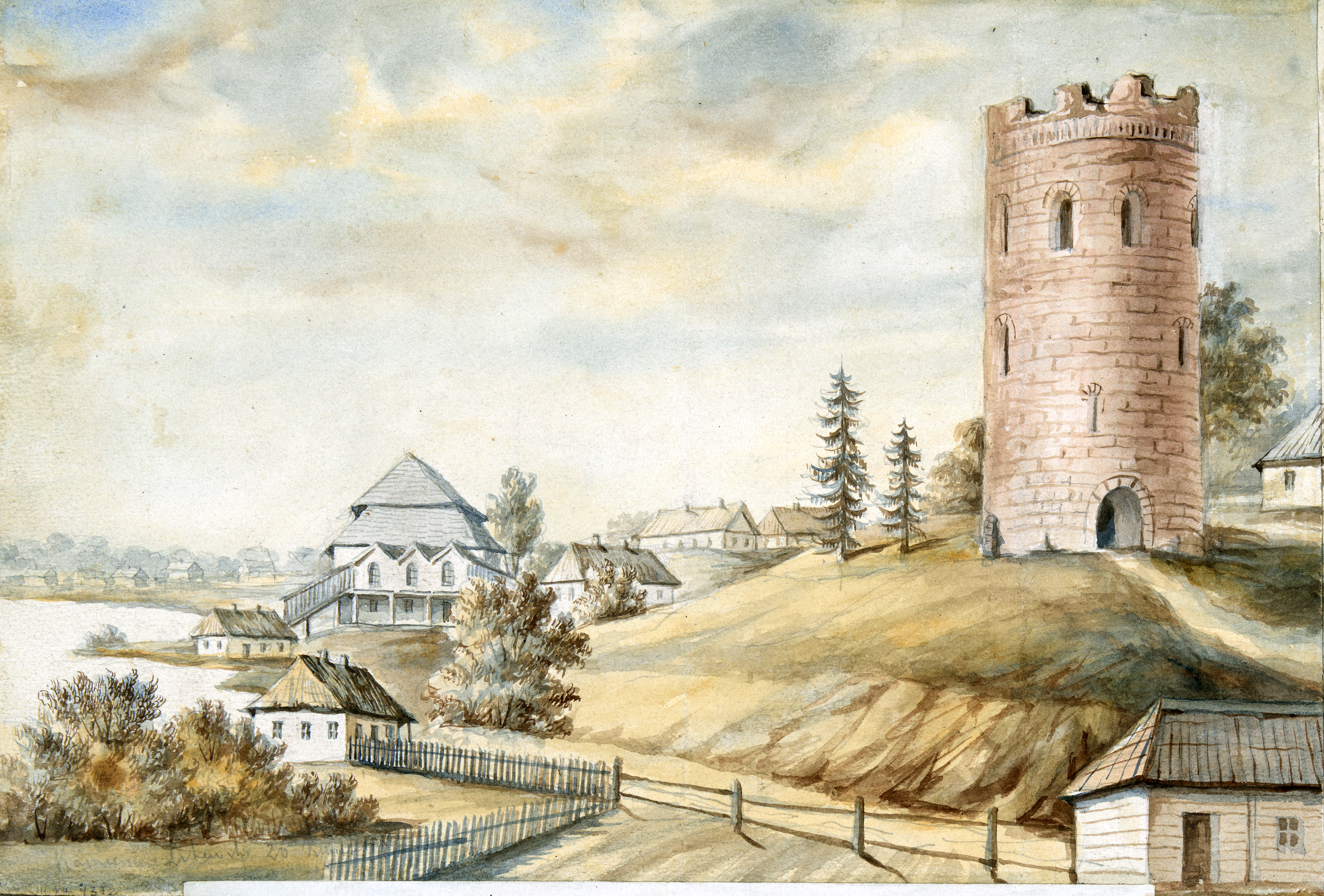
Kamianiec, 1876

El Lissitzky wrote about the murals in Cold synagogue in Mogilev after his and Issachar Ber Ryback's expedition:

The centerpiece of the whole place is the ceiling. On the western side, by the entrance, there stand giant lions and, behind them, peacocks. The lions hold two shields with inscriptions, the lower one is a memorial by the master for himself. Then there are three northern and three southern panels like a kind of frieze upon which unfurls the lives of predators and prey. Below there is water, upon it the earth, above the earth a sky; in the sky, stars that blossom into flowers. In the water—fish; they are being caught by the birds. On the earth a fox carries a bird in its snout. A bear climbs a tree looking for honey. Birds carry snakes in their beaks. All these flying things and running things—are people. Through their four-footed or feathered masks they look with human eyes. This is a very significant trend in Jewish folk art. Is that not a rabbinical face in the lion’s head in the zodiac paintings of the Mogilev Shul?

— El Lissitzky, On the Mogilev Shul: Recollections (1924)

"Jewish period" was very short in the art of El Lissitzky; on the contrary, for Issachar Ber Ryback everyday life of a Jewish shtetl became the foundation of his art. Ryback created several paintings of wooden synagogues, he probably was inspired for these works during the shtetl tour few years earlier.

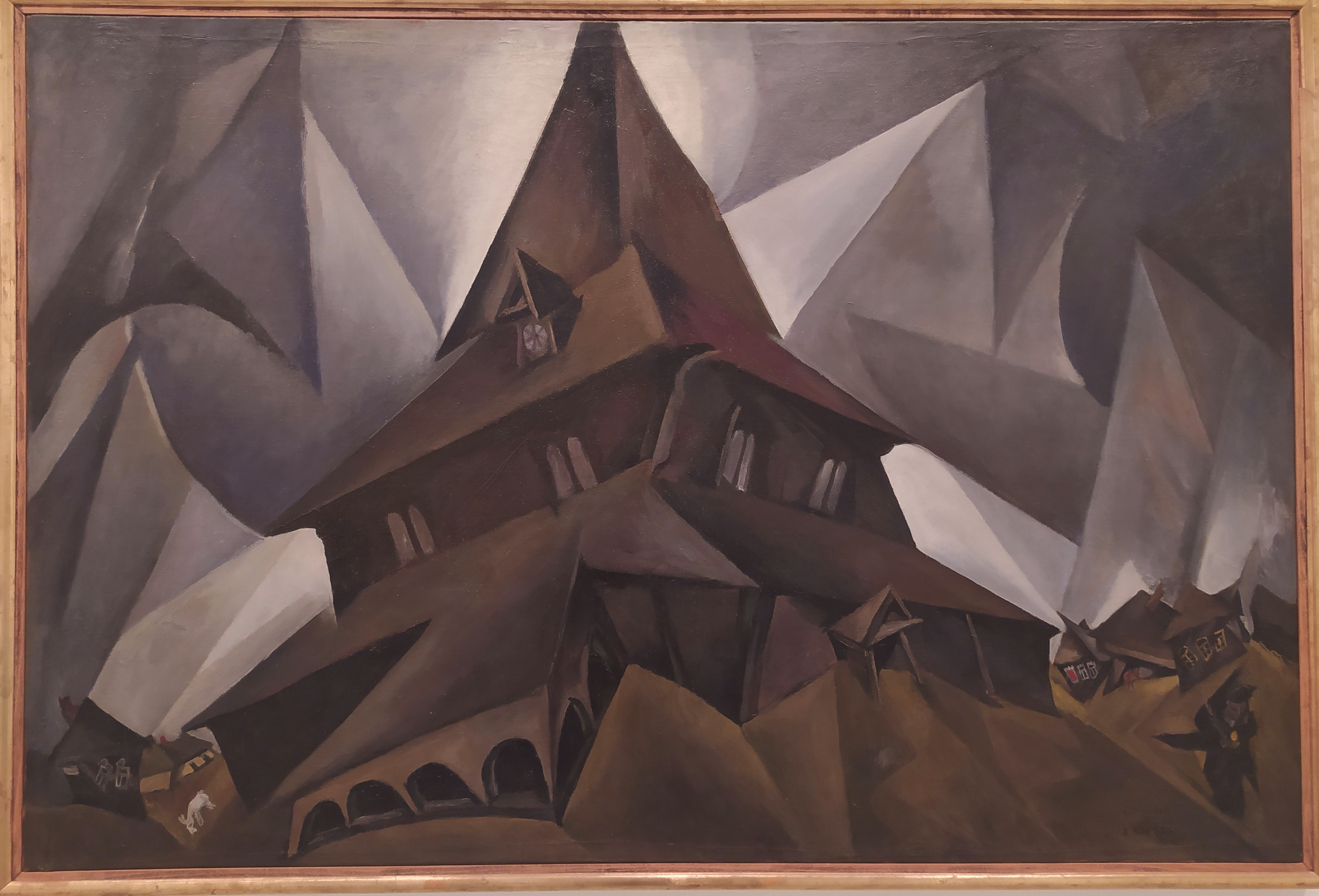
The Synagogue in Dubrouna by Ryback (1917)

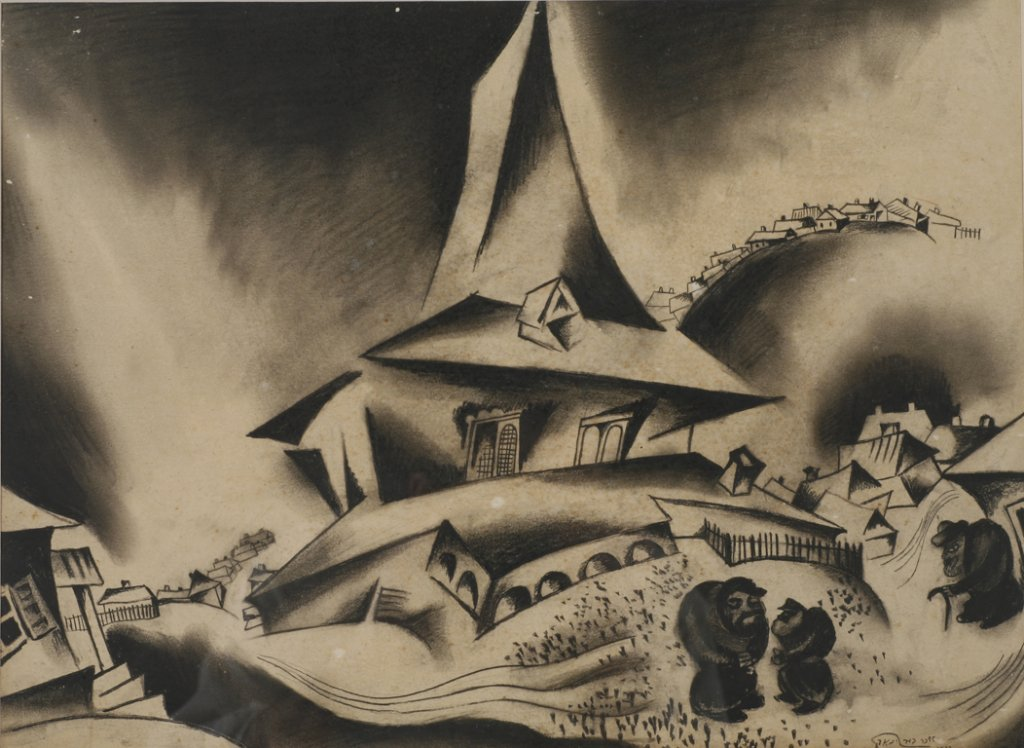
The Big Synagogue

Marc Chagall claimed that Chaim Segal, the artist who created murals in the Cold synagogue in Mogilev and several other synagogues, was his great-grandfather, and compares his own art to Segal's synagogue murals:

Jews, if they feel like it (I do), may cry that the painters of the shtetl wooden synagogues (why am I not with you in one grave) and the whittlers of the wooden synagogue rattles — "Hush!" (I saw it in An-sky's collection, got seared) are gone. But what is really the difference between my crippled Mohilev great-grandfather Segal who painted the Mohilev synagogue and me, who painted the Yiddish theater (a good theater) in Moscow? Believe me, no fewer lice visited both of us as we wallowed on the floor and in workshops. in synagogues and in theater. Furthermore, I am sure that, if I stop shaving, you would see his precise portrait...

By the way, my father [looked like him]. Believe me, I put quite a bit of effort, no less love (and what love!) have we both expended.

The difference is only that he [Segal] took orders for signs and I studied in Paris, about which he also heard something.

— Marc Chagall, Leaves from My Notebook (1920s)

== List of wooden synagogues ==
=== Surviving wooden synagogues ===
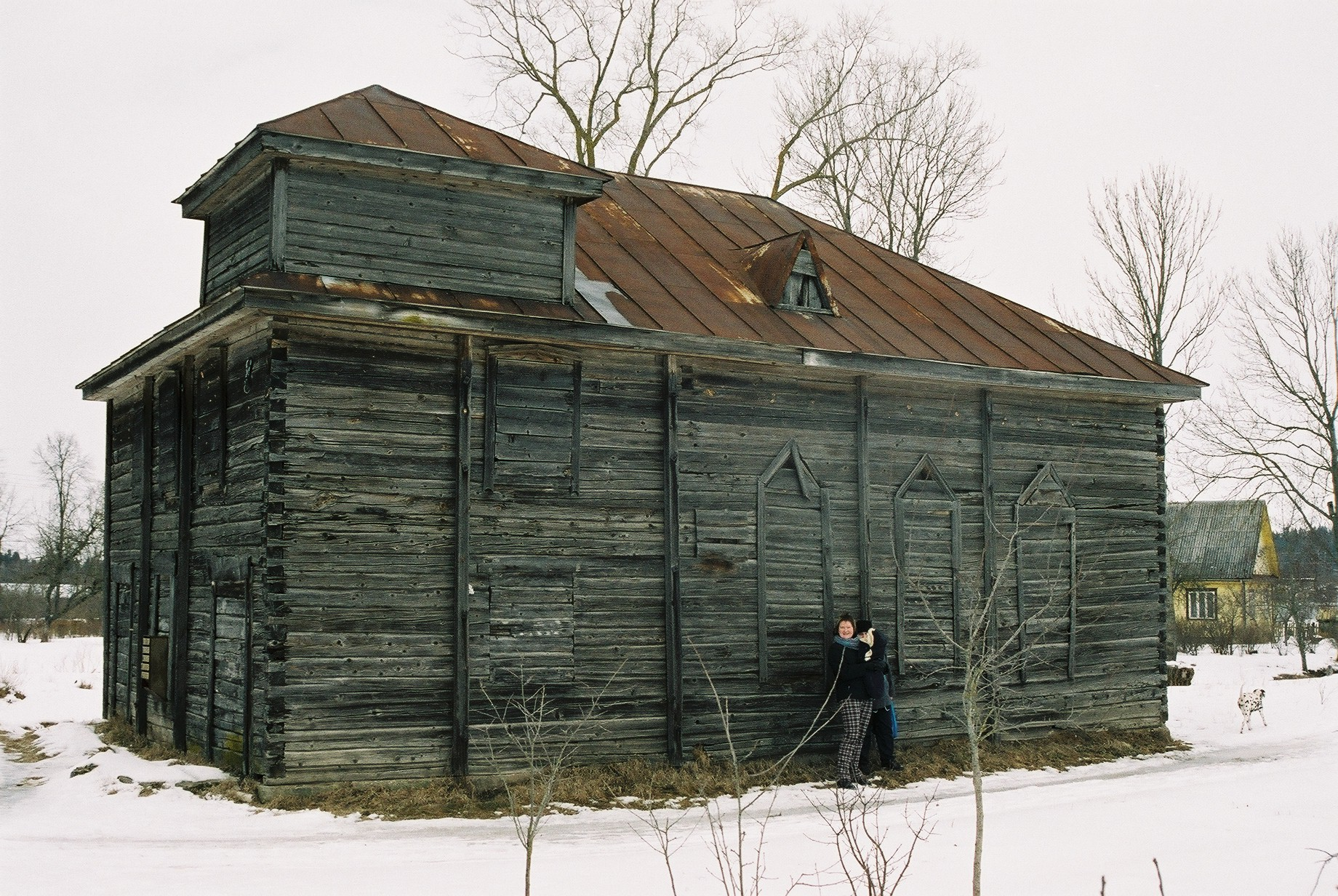
Surviving wooden synagogue in Kurkliai

Although it was long thought that none of the wooden synagogues survived the destruction of the First and Second World Wars, it is now known that a number do survive, albeit only of the smaller type.

Surviving examples include:

- Synagogue of Alanta, built in the late 19th century, in deteriorating condition
- Kaltinėnai
- Kurklach Synagogue, in Soviet times used as barn, now in deteriorating condition
- Laukuva
- Pakruojis, the largest of the wooden synagogues that survives in Lithuania (built 1801), restored in 2017.
- Rozalimas Synagogue, built in 19th century
- Subate (Latvia)
- Telszach Synagogue, built in the 19th century, vacated around 1940
- Tirkšliai
- Trakai Kenese, a Karaite synagogue called Kenesa built in the 18th century, with Torah ark and interior preserved in good condition
- Veisiejai
- Žiežmariai, under restoration since March 2016, exterior works completed in 2018

=== Destroyed wooden synagogues ===
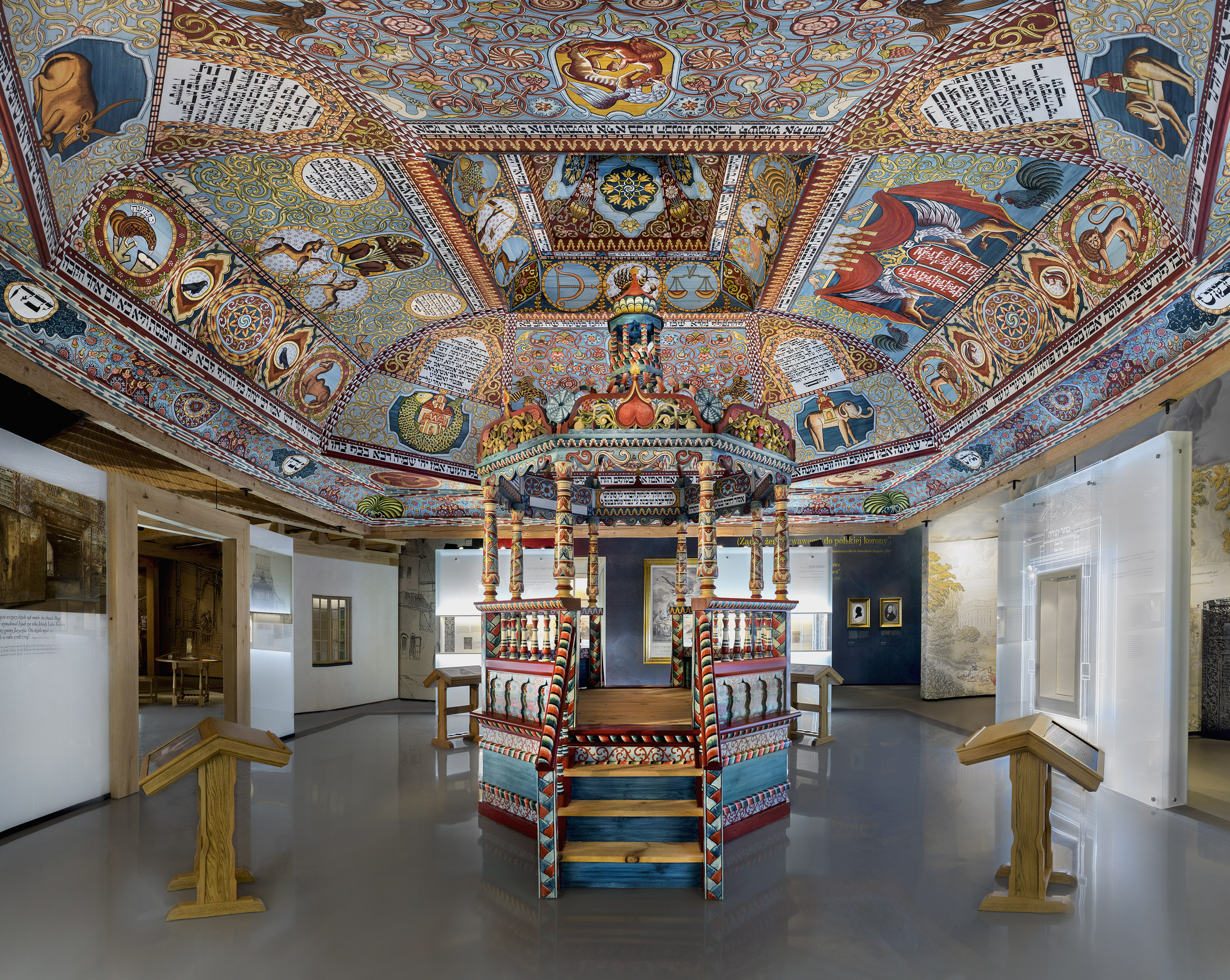
Reconstruction of the interior of the Gwoździec synagogue

Almost all wooden synagogues were destroyed in the 20th century. Some of them were documented during the ethnographic expeditions.

- Cold Synagogue, Mogilev - with murals from 1740, documented by El Lissitzky and Issachar Ber Ryback
- Gwoździec Synagogue - with murals from 1652, reconstructed in POLIN Museum of the History of Polish Jews
- Wołpa Synagogue - reputed to be the "most beautiful" of the wooden synagogues
- Przedbórz Synagogue
- Nasielsk Synagogue
- Zabłudów Synagogue

== Replicas ==
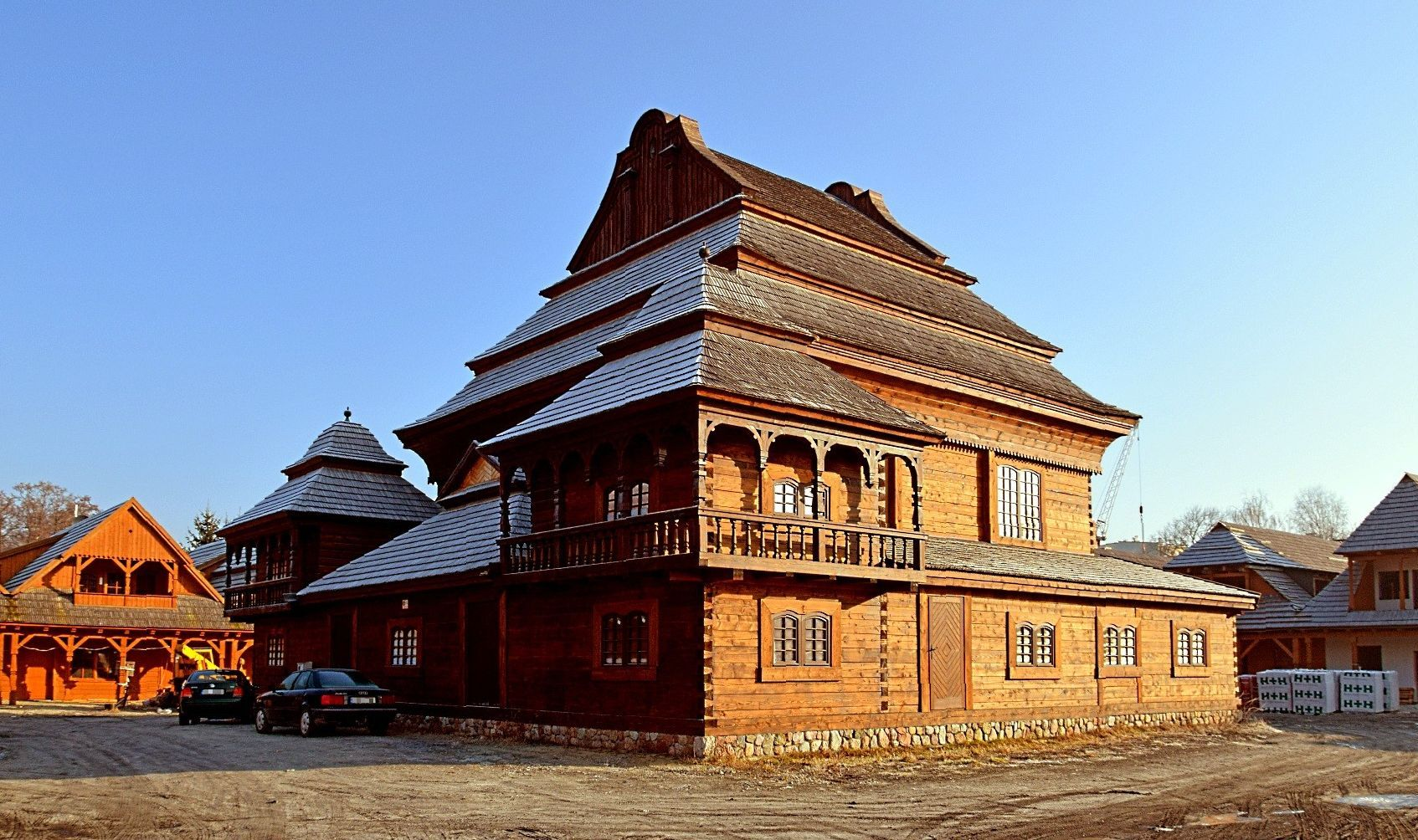
Replica of the Wołpa synagogue

There is a replica of the Wołpa Synagogue in Bilgoraj, and another replica of the synagogue (Połaniec) is in Sanok.

POLIN Museum of the History of Polish Jews in Warsaw has a partial reconstruction of the Gwoździec Synagogue.

The ceiling painting of the synagogue in Chodoriw was reconstructed for the ANU - Museum of the Jewish People (Beit Hatefusot) in Tel Aviv.

In the Musée d'Art et d'Histoire du Judaïsme (Museum of Jewish Art and History) in Paris there are models of several wooden synagogues.

In 2026, an art installation Nabatele became part of the Yiddishland Pavilion on the Venice Biennale. Created by a Jewish-Ukrainian artist Anna Kamyshan, it is a shtetl-style wooden synagogue placed on a rock that floats 45 meters above water.

== See also ==
- List of wooden synagogues
- History of the Jews in Poland
- History of the Jews in Lithuania
- History of the Jews in Galicia (Eastern Europe)
- History of the Jews in Ukraine
- Three hares
- Vernacular architecture of the Carpathians
