= Monastery of the Dormition of the Mother of God, Zabłudów =

Orthodox monastery in Zabłudów, Poland

Monastery of the Dormition of the Mother of God
- Location within Poland
- Interactive map of Monastery of the Dormition of the Mother of God

Monastery information
- Controlled churches: Church of the Dormition of the Mother of God

People
- Founders: Janusz and Maria Radziwiłł

Architecture
- Completion date: 1567 (church) first half of the 17th century (monastery buildings)
- Closed: 1824

Site
- Location: Zabłudów
- Coordinates: 53°00′46″N 23°20′16″E

The Monastery of the Dormition of the Mother of God was a men's Orthodox monastery in Zabłudów, operating from the first half of the 17th century until 1824.

The monastery in Zabłudów was established in the late first half of the 17th century, adjacent to a church of the Dormition of the Mother of God founded in 1567, through the endowment of Janusz Radziwiłł and Maria Radziwiłł. It was intended for 12 monks who managed a hospital and a lower theological school. Initially, it was subordinate to the Monastery of the Holy Spirit in Vilnius, and later to the Monastery of the Holy Trinity in Slutsk.

Despite pressure from Uniate Church authorities, the monastery never adopted the Union of Brest. In the 17th and 18th centuries, it was one of the most significant Orthodox centers in Podlachia. From 1746 to 1755, it housed the relics of Gabriel of Białystok, a boy informally revered by Orthodox Christians in the Polish-Lithuanian Commonwealth as a holy martyr. By the 18th century, only four monks resided there. Due to financial difficulties and a low number of vocations, it was closed in 1824 by decision of the consistory of the Diocese of Minsk.

== History ==
=== In the Polish-Lithuanian Commonwealth ===
==== 17th century ====
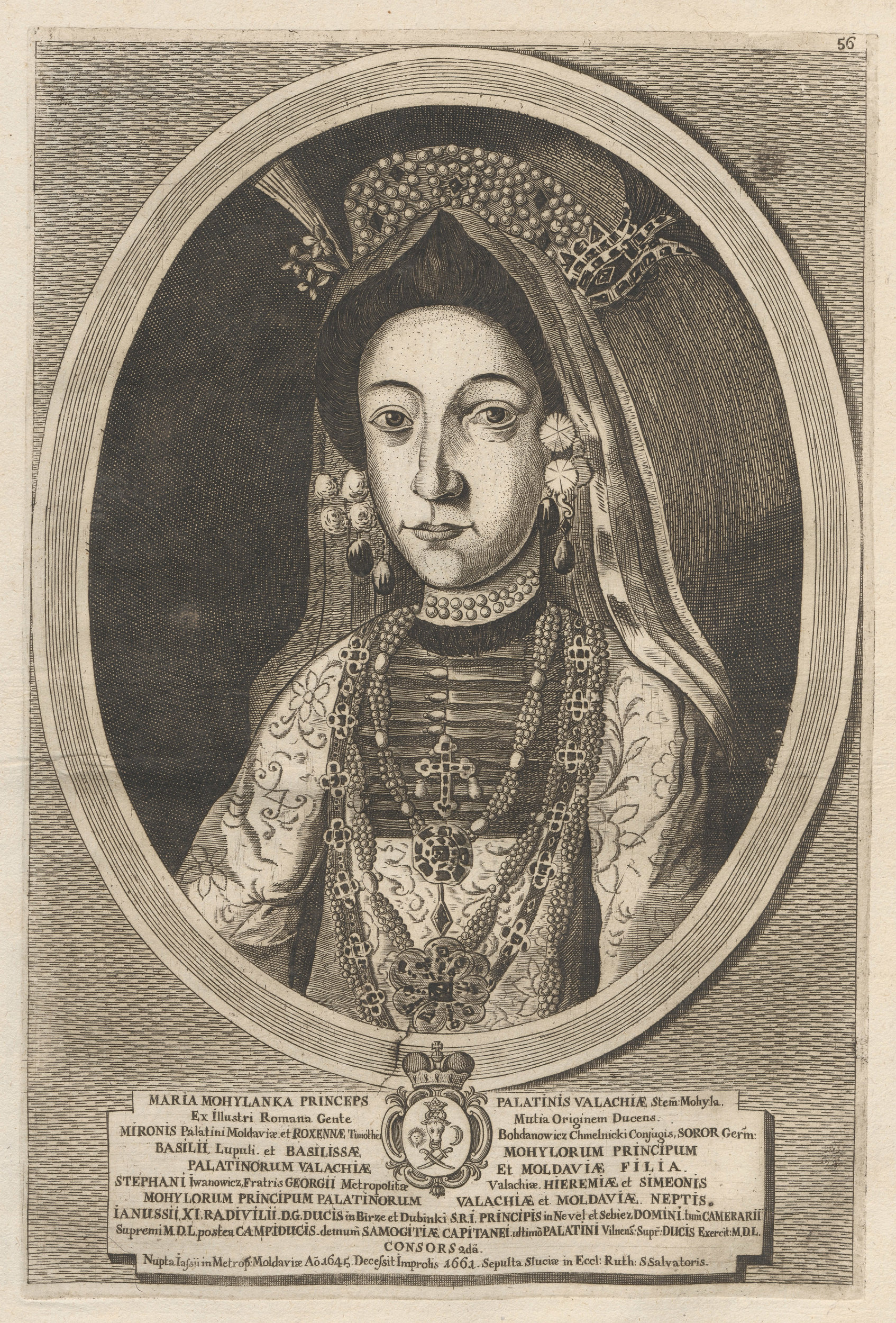
Maria Radziwiłł, founder and patroness of the monastery in Zabłudów

The Monastery of the Dormition of the Mother of God in Zabłudów was founded by Janusz Radziwiłł and his wife Maria Wołoszka, an Orthodox believer, before 1655. Tomasz Kempa argues that its founding occurred in the 1640s, attributing the initiative primarily to Maria Radziwiłł, a devoted patron of Orthodox Christians, similar to her role in establishing the Monastery of the Transfiguration in Kėdainiai around the same time. The founding document specified it was for 12 monks, a number maintained throughout the 17th century.

A common misconception in some sources suggests the monastery was founded in 1567, alongside the Orthodox Parish of the Dormition of the Mother of God, established by Hrehory Chodkiewicz, the local estate owner.

In 1659, shortly before her death, Maria Radziwiłł drafted a will, influenced by Archimandrite Joseph Tukalskyi-Nelyubovych of the Vilnius monastery, bequeathing 600,000 PLN to the Kyiv Pechersk Lavra, and monasteries in Vilnius, Vievis, Kupiatychi, Kronie, Minsk, and Zabłudów, allocating 100,000 PLN specifically to the latter. She directed funds for a school run by the monks and designated Zabłudów as her burial site if burial in Vilnius proved impossible, while also mandating special prayers for her soul and her parents, entrusting execution to Archimandrite Joseph. However, her husband's nephew, Bogusław Radziwiłł, contested the will, raiding the monastery to prevent the transfer of assets. In 1661, he convinced the Warsaw Sejm to declare it a forgery by Joseph. The archimandrite and Belarusian Bishop Teodozjusz Wasilewicz repeatedly challenged this before the Lithuanian Tribunal, accusing Radziwiłł of obstructing the will and attacking monastery lands, but the funds were never received. This thwarted plans for a full school, limiting it to a lower theological seminary for priest candidates.

Some literature posits the monastery was under the Monastery of the Holy Trinity in Slutsk, but Kempa's analysis of Maria's will suggests it initially recognized the authority of the Vilnius monastery, shifting to Slutsk only in 1686.

Despite pressure, the monastery never joined the Union of Brest, remaining Orthodox. Bołtryk suggests monks from the Supraśl Orthodox Monastery, unwilling to accept its union transition, joined Zabłudów. Its survival as an Orthodox hub was aided by the tolerance of the Calvinist Biržai Radziwiłłs, local estate owners. Metropolitan Havryil Kolenda pushed to integrate it (and the Zabłudów parish) into the Uniate Church. In 1666, a Grodno court ordered the church transferred to Uniates, but the monastery remained Orthodox, and the Uniates ceased pursuit. Jewish locals also occasionally raided the monastery.

==== 18th century ====
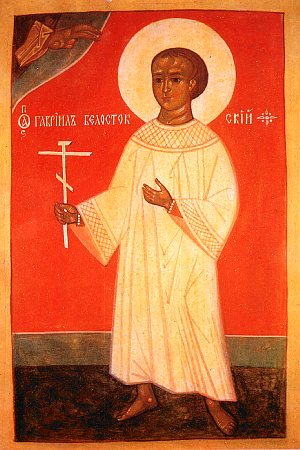
Gabriel of Białystok on a 19th-century icon. His relics were kept in the monastery from 1746 to 1755.

In the 18th century, tensions arose with local Roman Catholic clergy, who opposed a 1738 bell tower construction and, with the Vilnius Catholic bishop's support in 1746, blocked rebuilding the main church after a fire. These disputes prompted Russian intervention in 1753 and recurred in 1761 over temple construction.

In 1746, the body of Gabriel of Białystok, a murdered Orthodox boy from Zwierki on 17 April 1690, revered informally as a saint, was brought to the monastery. Highly venerated in the Commonwealth, his presence was significant. Due to ongoing Uniate pressure, his relics were moved to Slutsk in 1755 via a procession authorized by Hieronim Florian Radziwiłł. This coincided with Zabłudów passing to the Catholic Białystok Radziwiłłs, less supportive than their predecessors. A 1768 letter from the Slutsk archimandrite to Michał Radziwiłł sought to enforce monks' rights to forest access and tithe collection.

In 1755, Metropolitan Tymoteusz Szczerbacki banned Podlachian monastery superiors from engaging in Catholic disputes, enforcing passivity and diminishing Zabłudów's prominence after Gabriel's relics left.

Conditions improved after 1783 under Hegumen Sofroniusz Michalski, who renovated buildings, refurbished the church interior, commissioned a new iconostasis, and received liturgical books and utensils from Bishop Wiktor Sadkowski of Pereyaslav.

=== In Prussian Partition ===
After the Third Partition of Poland, Zabłudów fell under Prussian rule. The monastery remained a key Orthodox center for Podlachia's small Orthodox population, one of three such churches alongside those in Bielsk Podlaski and Drohiczyn. Most other parishes had joined the Uniate Church in the 17th century. In 1798, it became a branch of the Monastery of Saint Simeon Stylites in Brest.

Prussian authorities intended it as the center of an eparchy for the Białystok department under the Ecumenical Patriarchate of Constantinople, with Hegumen Sofroniusz as its head, but the Treaties of Tilsit shifted Zabłudów to Russia, halting the plan.

=== In the Russian Empire ===
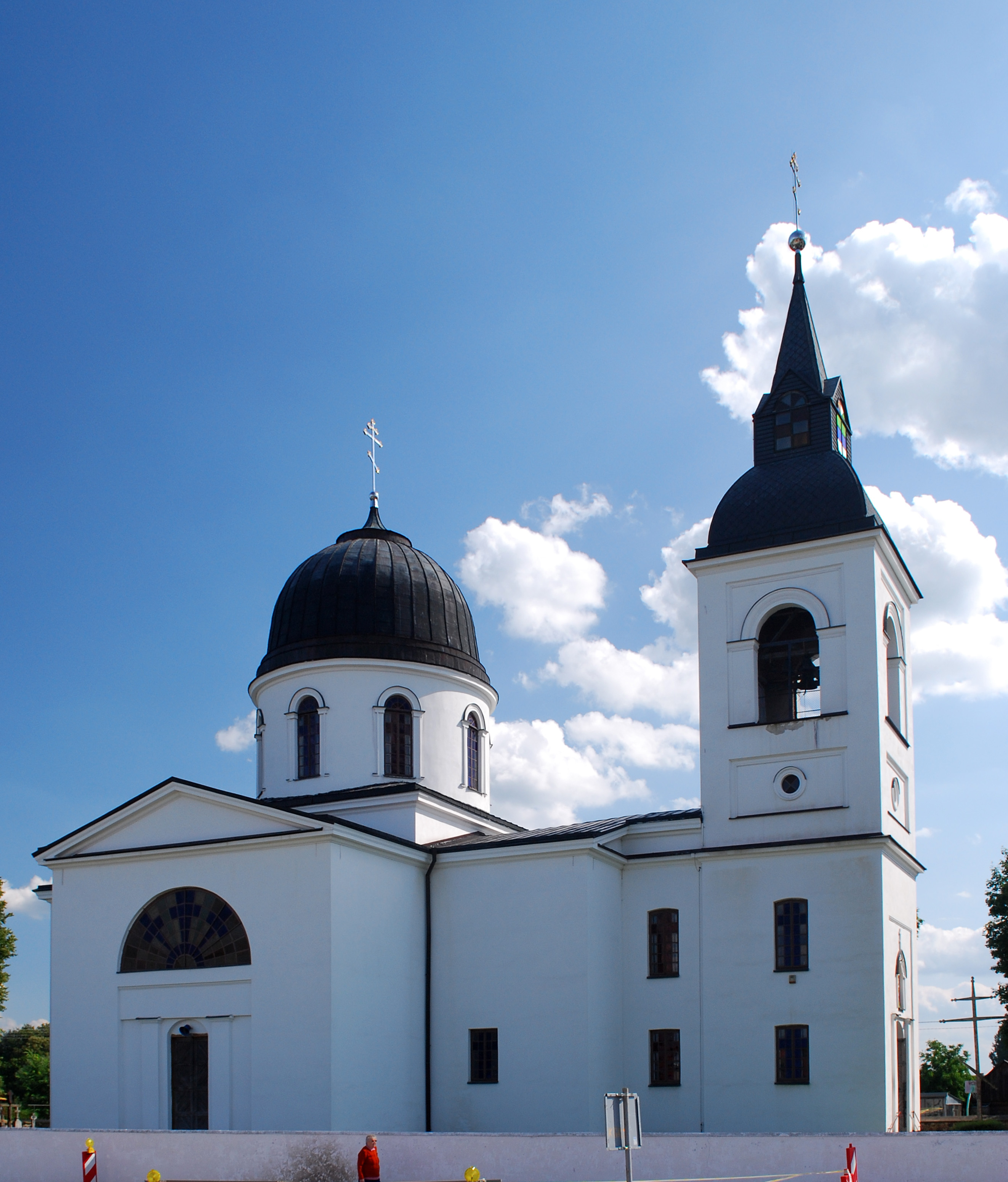
Church in Zabłudów, built to replace the older structure serving both parish and monastery

Upon incorporation into Russia, the monastery fell under the Diocese of Minsk of the Russian Orthodox Church. By then, it was severely declined. A 1808 visitation ordered by Bishop Hiob Potiomkin found two monks, two secular priests, and poor structural conditions.

A fire destroyed it in 1821, and it was closed in 1824 by the Minsk consistory due to poverty and few monks. Urszula Pawluczuk links this to Tsar Alexander I's tolerance of non-Orthodox groups. Its assets went to larger monasteries, where the last monks relocated. The Orthodox parish persisted, building a new church, but the monastery structures did not survive.

== Architecture ==
The 1808 visitation documented the monastery's components: a three-domed Church of the Dormition of the Mother of God, a bell tower with five church bells, a former refectory church repurposed as living quarters and candle storage due to disrepair, and farmstead buildings including a bakery. All were wooden, with economic structures having straw roofs, enclosed by a fence. The main church, from the 16th century, was founded by Grzegorz Chodkiewicz, while the refectory church, for monks' exclusive use, dated to the mid-17th century.

== Monastic community ==
The founding documents allocated space for 12 monks. In the early 18th century, it housed four hieromonks; by 1783, a hegumen and three monks. From 1798, the hegumen also served as archimandrite of the Brest monastery. That year, it had a hegumen and two monks. By 1808, only two monks and two secular priests remained, managing a hospital with four patients.

The monastery's rich library, bolstered by ties to Slutsk, held handwritten and printed liturgical books from the 16th and 17th centuries, produced in Zabłudów, Moscow, Kyiv, or Vilnius by 1677.

== Property and livelihood ==
Maria and Janusz Radziwiłł pledged 150,000 PLN at its founding, but this was never received. The 1808 Podlachia visitation showed it subsisted on cultivating three włóki (about 55 hectares or 136 acres) donated by Grzegorz Chodkiewicz, plus tithes from 233 peasant fields under the parish. It owned three rentable houses in Zabłudów, leased with land-use rights for one day's weekly labor. The monks ran a farmstead and bakery, and priests served a parish of 2,622 faithful. Persistent tithe collection issues necessitated external aid.

Financial hardship persisted. In 1821, it sought Maria's bequeathed income, submitting documents to the Minsk consistory, but closure preempted resolution.
