= Upytė =

- Town
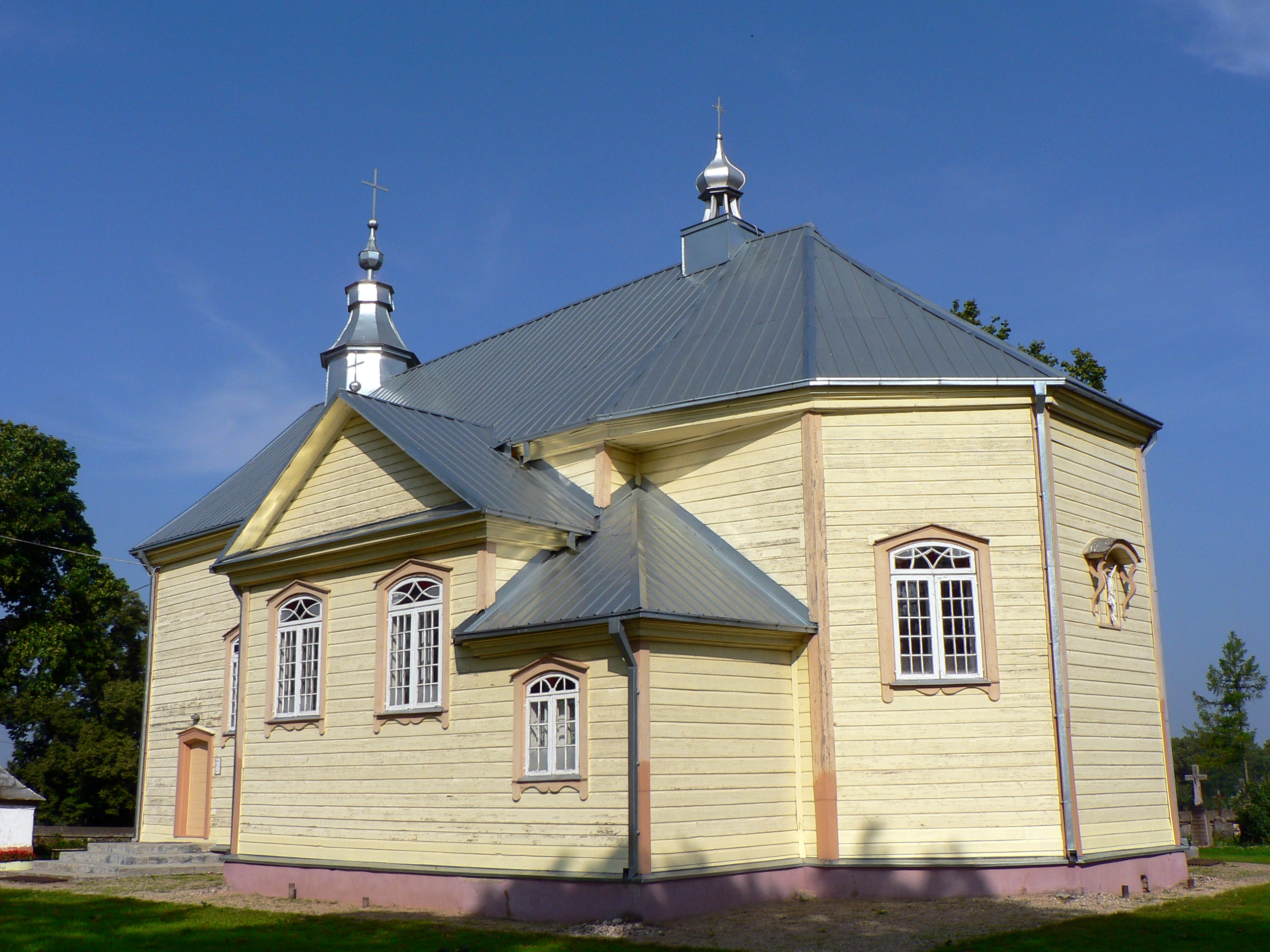
- The wooden St. Charles Borromeo church in Upytė (built in 1878 upon the foundations of an earlier church from 1742).

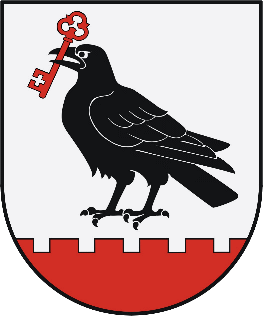
- Coat of arms

- Location within Lithuania
- Coordinates: 55°39′11″N 24°13′59″E
- Country: Lithuania
- County: Panevėžys County

Population (2011)
  - Total: 525
- Time zone: UTC+2 (EET)
  - Summer (DST): UTC+3 (EEST)

Upytė is a small village in Panevėžys district municipality in northern Lithuania. It is situated some 12 km southwest of Panevėžys on the banks of Vešeta Creek. It is now the capital of an elderate. In 1987 it had 580 residents. In the Lithuanian language, Upytė is a diminutive form of the word upė, which means river.

In 2004 Upytė celebrated its 750th anniversary by holding a conference Upytė Land: History and Culture. Upytė linen museum is located in Stultiškiai.

== History ==
The name Upytė was first mentioned in 1254 in a Livonian chronicle dealing with the divisions of the Upmala region. Upytė had a wooden castle built on an island which later became a hillfort when Lake Vešeta was drained. The castle was an important northern defence post against numerous incursions of the Livonian Order. Between 1353 and 1379 alone, it repelled ten such attacks. The castle was further expanded and fortified in the 15th century, when it served as the seat of the Starost of Upytė. It is believed that the abandoned castle collapsed in the 17th century after the seat of the starost was moved to Panevėžys. The remnants of the castle survived into the 18th century.

Upytė was a capital of the Upytė region (Lithuanian: Upytės žemė) in the Grand Duchy of Lithuania. The area was later made into an eldership, part of the Principality of Trakai. A document from 1556 states that Panevėžys, along with 57 other towns and 359 villages was part of this eldership. In the 16th century, Upytė began to lose its prominence when the defensive castle became obsolete, and Krekenava became the capital of the Upytė Eldership in 1548. At that time, Panevėžys grew to become a center of economic importance and Upytė became eclipsed by this rival. Nevertheless, Upytė is one of the longest surviving regional capitals from earlier times.

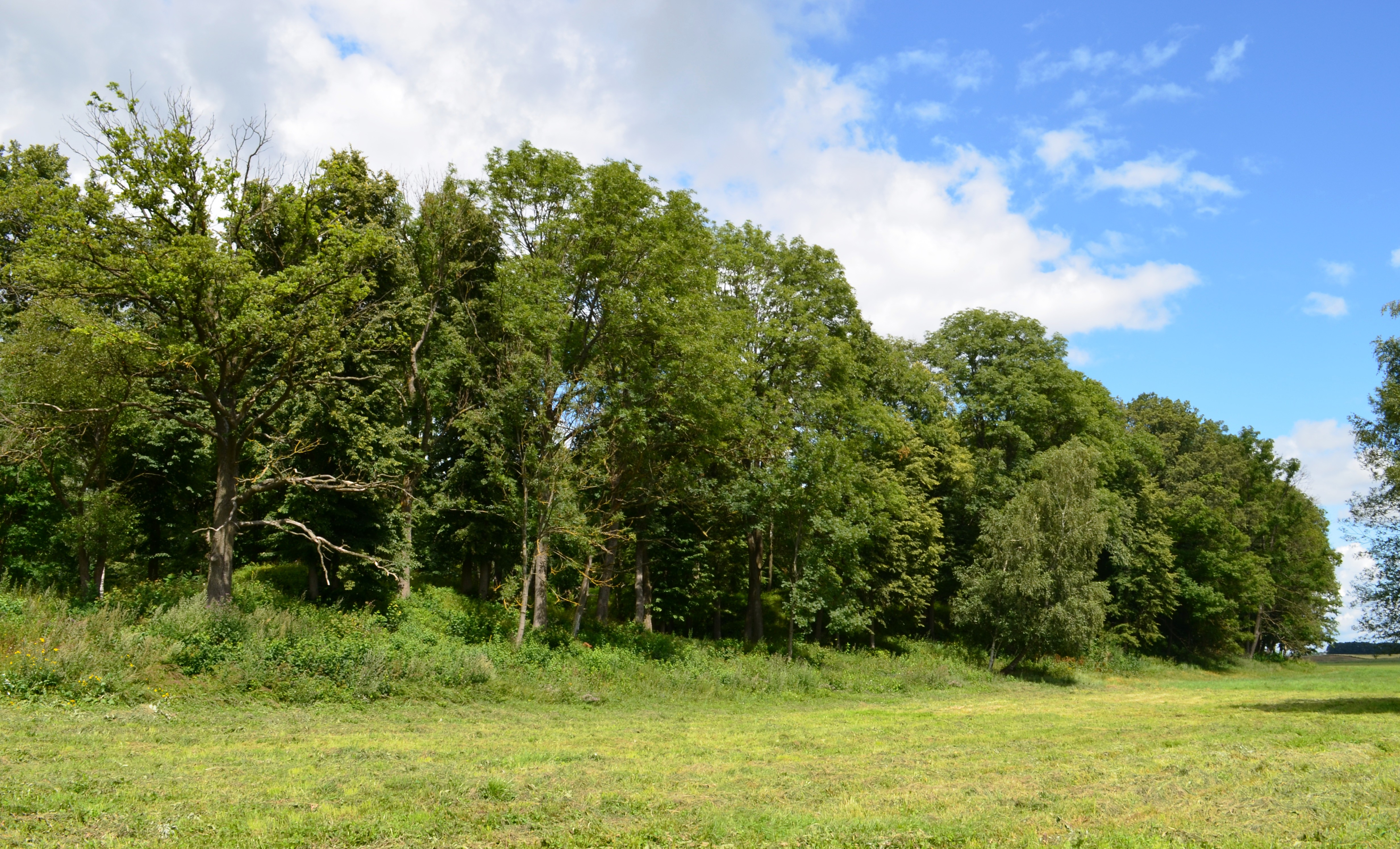
Hill of Čičinskas

The elders of Upytė included Konstanty Ostrogski, Stanislovas Goštautas, Michał Kazimierz Radziwiłł and Janusz Radziwiłł. In 1652, one of its elders, a delegate to Warsaw Sejm, Władysław Siciński (Polish name, in Lithuanian known as Čičinskas), allegedly bribed by Janusz Radziwiłł, was the first person to execute his Liberum veto rights in order to disrupt Sejm convention. The Liberum veto was believed to be one of the factors leading to the collapse of Polish-Lithuanian democracy, and eventually to the partition of the commonwealth by foreign powers.

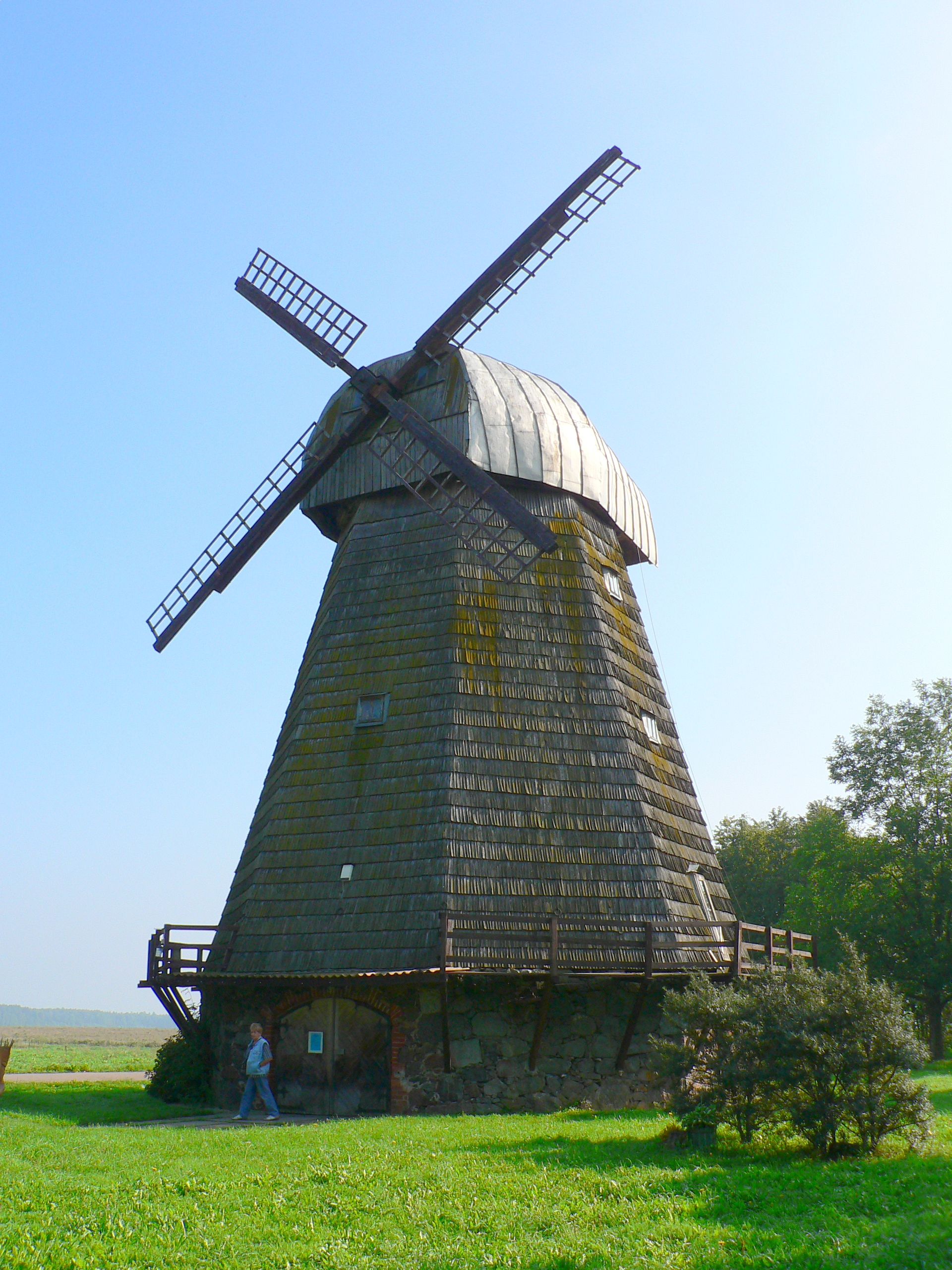
Historic wooden windmill in Stultiškiai 2km from Upytė (today a museum of linen)

According to a local legend the evil master Čičinskas was struck by thunder god Perkūnas for all his sins, and his estate sank in a sinkhole located near the Upytė hillfort, called now the "Hill of Čičinskas". The legend has it that his dead body appeared since and haunted the Russians in the neighbourhood. Eventually, Mikhail Muravyov the Hanger ordered it to be exhumed and buried under the floor of the church in 1865. According to the legend this led to Muravyov's death soon after. The legend was reproduced by poets Adam Mickiewicz in his ballad The Stay in Upita and Maironis in his poem Čičinskas. It was also mentioned by a number of other Lithuanian and Polish authors.

In 1938 archeologists excavated a graveyard near Upytė, dating from the 3-5th centuries, containing 51 graves of women, men, and children. The graves provided a number of findings: men's graves had iron tools and guns (bridles, axes, knives, etc.) and women's had bronze jewellery (bracelets, pins, pendants, beads, etc.)
