= Sicinski =

Sicinski, Siciński (feminine: Sicińska; plural: Sicińscy) is a surname. Lithuanian form is Sicinskis, Belarus Сіцынскі, Ukrainian Сіцінський. Notable people with the surname include:

- Bob Sicinski (born 1946), Canadian ice hockey player
- Władysław Siciński (c. 1615 – 1672), Polish-Lithuanian noble
