= Zabłudów Synagogue =

Destroyed synagogue in Zabłudów, Poland

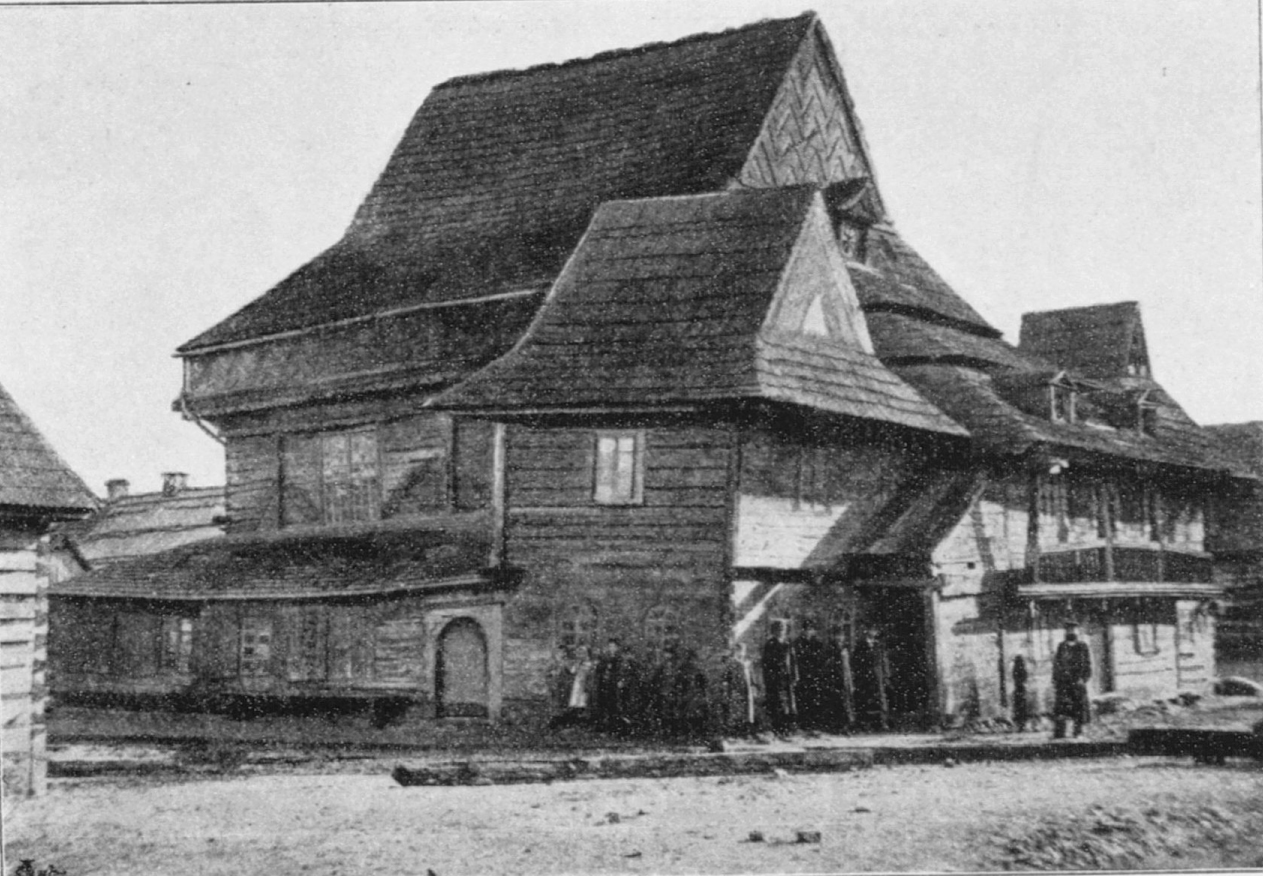
- The former wooden synagogue, 1895

- Location of the destroyed synagogue in Podlaskie Voivodeship

Religion
- Affiliation: Orthodox Judaism (former)
- Ecclesiastical or organizational status: Synagogue (c. 1640–1941)
- Status: Destroyed

Location
- Location: Zabłudów, Podlaskie Voivodeship
- Country: Poland
- Interactive map of Zabłudów Synagogue
- Coordinates: 53°00′57″N 23°20′04″E

Architecture
- Architect: Janusz Radziwiłł
- Type: Synagogue architecture
- Style: Wooden synagogue
- General contractor: Janusz Radziwiłł
- Completed: c. 1640
- Destroyed: June 24, 1941

Specifications
- Length: 11.3 m (37 ft)
- Width: 11.7 m (38 ft)
- Height (max): 9.75 m (32.0 ft)
- Materials: Timber

The Zabłudów Synagogue was a former Orthodox Jewish congregation and wooden synagogue, located in Zabłudów, in the Podlaskie Voivodeship of Poland. Completed in c. 1640, the synagogue served as a house of prayer until World War II when it was destroyed by Nazis in June 1941. The synagogue was burned to the ground by the German occupying authorities immediately after their conquest of the town.

== History ==
In the 17th century the town was owned by the Radziwiłł family. In 1635 permission was granted by Krzysztof Radziwiłł for the construction of the synagogue. Most likely this was built by his son Janusz Radziwiłł in 1640. Over the years it was permanently extended and altered. The last alterations took place between 1895 and 1923. It was burnt down by German soldiers in the first days of the invasion of the Soviet Union in June 1941.

A replica of the Zabłudów synagogue was made in 2004 at the University of Wisconsin in the course study.

== Architecture ==
The main hall was built of horizontal timbers and was nearly square in plan, or 11.3 m × 11.7 m (37 ft × 38 ft). The walls had a height of 6.5 m (21 ft); the height to the most elevated point of the barrel vault was 9.75 m (32.0 ft). Originally the main hall would have been lit by eight two-light windows, 2 in each wall. Following addition of a women's prayer room on the upper level, the west windows were removed. Already in 1646 it had been decided to build a women's room at ground level. In later years, two corner pavilions were added. In 1765 restoration of the entire building was undertaken and at the beginning of the 18th century the vestibule was enlarged and a women's room was constructed above it. The shape of the roof was altered several times.

The Holy Ark was elevated on two levels and composed of elements of varied artistic and material quality.

The Bimah was an octagonal little building-chapel with two porches over the stairs. It was located near the entrance.

== Gallery ==
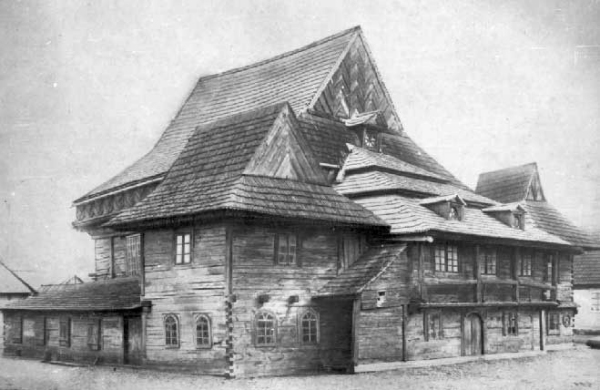
Zabłudów Synagogue

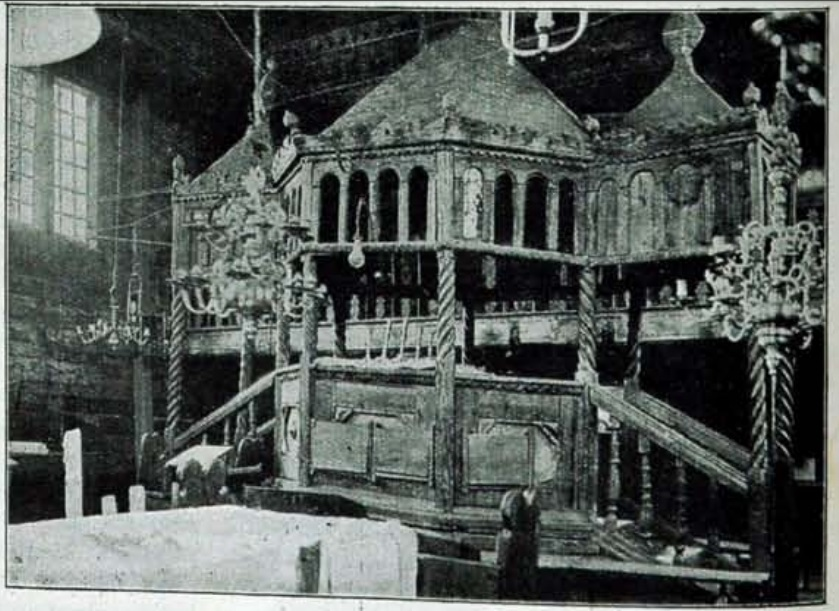
Bimah

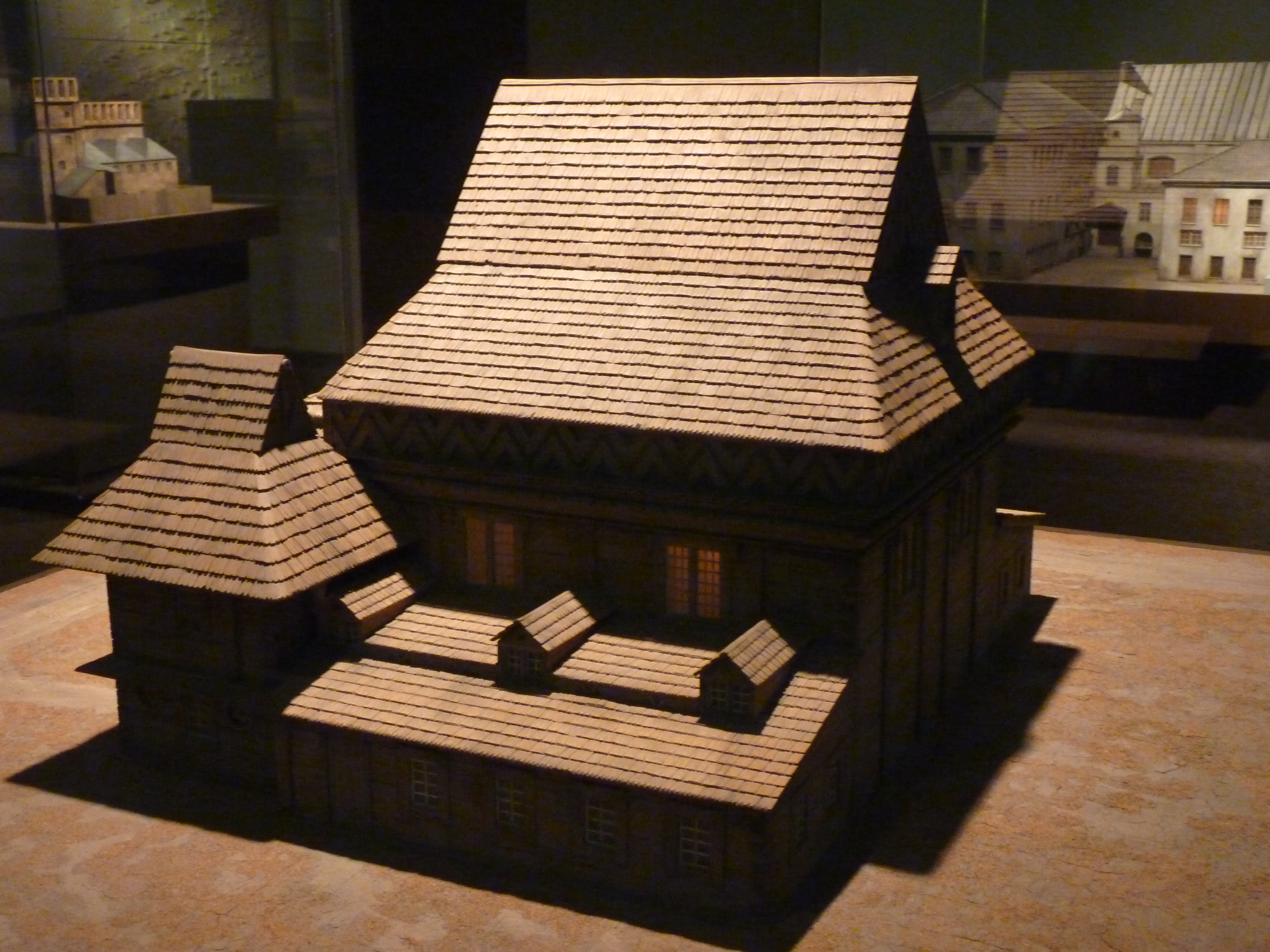
A model of the synagogue

== See also ==
- History of the Jews in Poland
- List of active synagogues in Poland
