= Soldan =

Soldan may refer to:

== People ==
- Soldan family, in Moldavia
- Louis Soldan (1920–1971), Austrian actor
- Mackenzie Soldan (born 1992), American basketball and tennis player
- Narciso Soldan (1927–1987), Italian footballer
- Sandra Soldan (born 1973), Brazilian athlete
- Silvio Soldán (born 1935), Argentine presenter
- Uğur Soldan (born 1978), Turkish author
- Venny Soldan-Brofeldt (1863–1945), Finnish painter
- Carlos Moreyra y Paz Soldán (1898–1981), Peruvian engineer and politician
- Edmundo Paz Soldán (born 1967), Bolivian writer
- Luis Alayza y Paz Soldán (1883–1976), Peruvian writer and diplomat
- Mariano Felipe Paz Soldán (1821–1886), Peruvian historian and geographer
- Sawdan (9th century), Emir of Bari, also known as Soldan

== Other uses ==
- Aho & Soldan, a film production company
- Soldan, an archaic word for Sultan
- 14190 Soldán
- Soldan International Studies High School, a school in St. Louis, Missouri

== See also ==
- Soldano (disambiguation)
