= Soldano =

Soldano may refer to:

- Soldano, Liguria, a comune in the province of Imperia, Italy
- Soldano Custom Amplification, a custom guitar amplifier manufacturing company in the USA
- Cristian Mauro Soldano (born 1976), Argentine swimmer
- Diego Soldano (born 1969), Argentine actor
- Franco Soldano (born 1994), Argentine footballer
- Nina Soldano (born 1963), Italian actress

== See also ==
- Soldan (disambiguation)
