= Maria Radziwiłł =

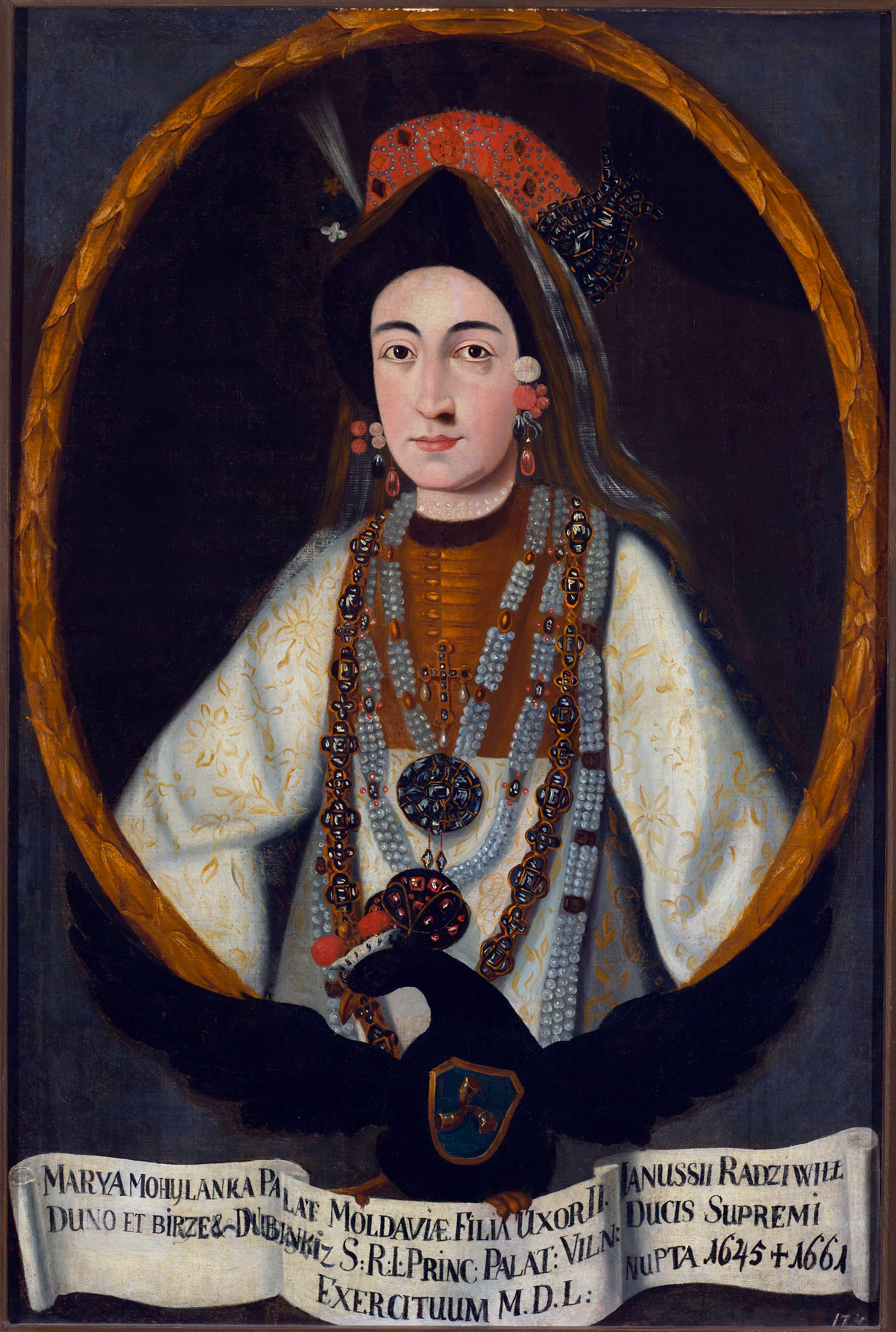
Maria Lupu-Radziwiłł, around 1733/37, after a contemporary copper engraving

Maria Radziwiłł (born Maria Lupu around 1625 in Moldavia; died 14 or 15 January 1660 in Lutsk, Polish–Lithuanian Commonwealth) was a Moldavian patroness and wife of the Lithuanian Grand Hetman Janusz Radziwiłł.

== Life ==
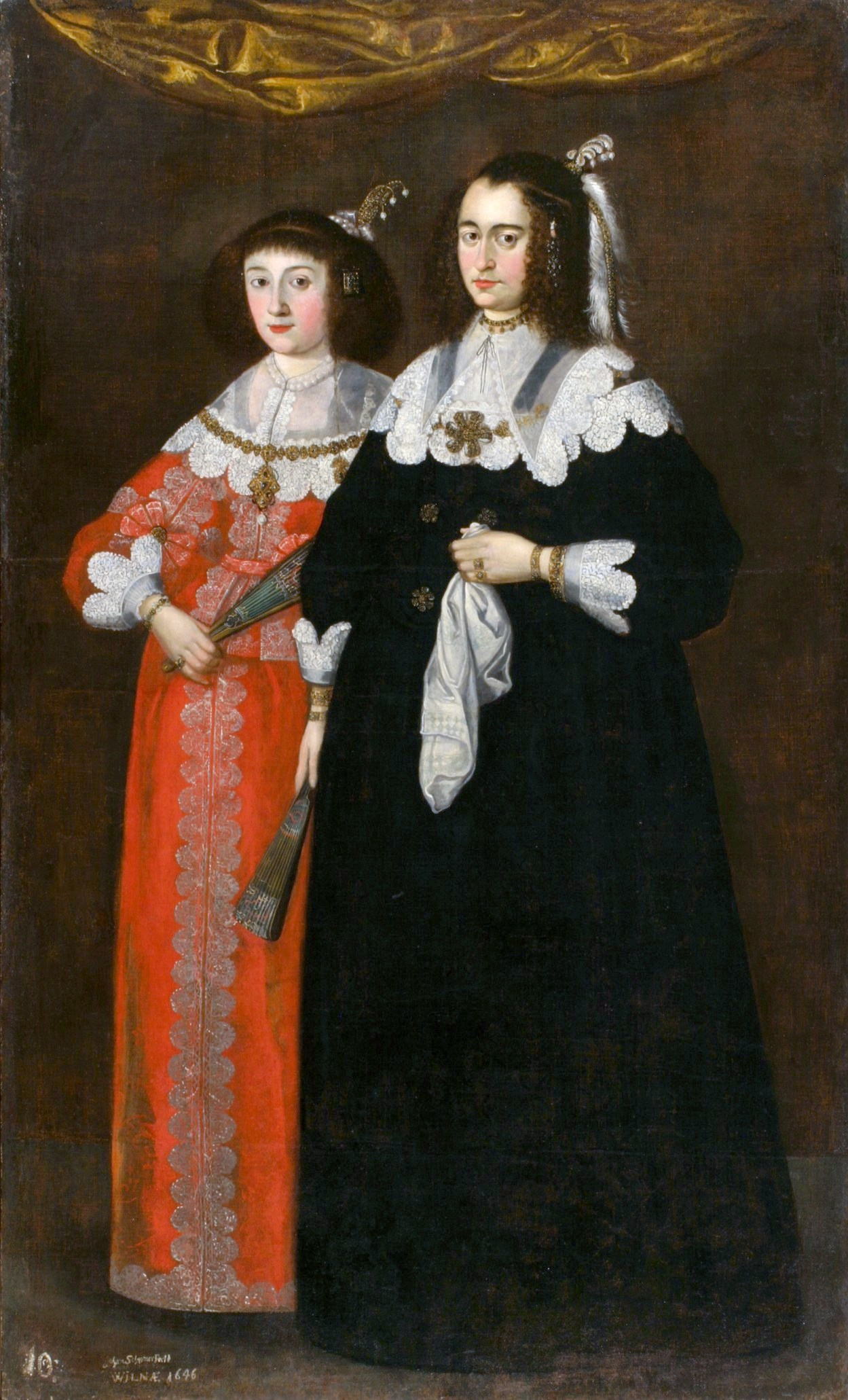
Maria Lupu with the previous wife Katarzyna Potocka, painting by Johann Schretter 1646

Maria was a daughter of the Moldavian voivode Vasile Lupu and his wife, Todoșca Costea Soldan. Her sister Ruxandra became the wife of the military leader Tymofiy Khmelnytsky, and her half-brother Ștefăniță Lupu became the Prince of Moldavia. Maria received an education, learning to speak Greek and Latin languages, and later also Polish.

In 1645 she married the Grand Chamberlain of the Grand Duchy of Lithuania Janusz Radziwiłł after the death of his first wife Katarzyna. This marriage was intended to strengthen the political alliance between the Principality of Moldavia and Poland-Lithuania. The pompous ceremony in the cathedral in Iași was chaired by the Kiev Metropolitan Peter Mogila. The bride was praised in contemporary accounts for her beauty and splendid jewelry.

Maria brought a dowry from her father into the marriage, from her husband she received 45,000 złoty, as well as diamonds, gold and silver worth 15,000 złoty, and some land from the Polish king Władysław IV Vasa. The couple spent the honeymoon in Italy.

In 1652, when her Protestant husband founded a small Orthodox monastery in his seat in Kėdainiai, Maria's father and Maria herself made donations for the inventory. After Janusz Radziwiłł's death in 1655, Maria led a long and somewhat unsuccessful legal battle over part of his inheritance.

Maria Radziwiłł supported Orthodox churches in Poland-Lithuania and the Principality of Moldavia. In her will of November 1659, she bequeathed the Holy Spirit Monastery in Vilnius 200,000 złoty, 13 other monasteries, 7 churches, hospitals and a school 471,000 złoty. She was buried in the Orthodox Trinity Monastery in Lutsk. There were also disputes about her further inheritance.

Maria Lupu Radziwiłł has been portrayed many times. At least eight paintings and engravings have survived.

In 1917 her zinc coffin was removed from the Trinity Monastery in Lutsk. Since 2018 a Maria Lupu-Radvilienė Essay Contest is held in Kėdainiai, where she had lived for a long time, organized by the Romanian embassy in Lithuania.

== Literature ==
- Lilia Zabolotnaia: The history of the private life of Maria (Lupu) Radziwiłł reflected in the images of the epoch. In: Annales Universitatis Mariae Curie-Skłodowska. Sectio M, Balcaniensis et Carpathiensis. Vol. 2. 2017. Pp. 209–221.
- Lilia Zabolotnaia: The Riddles, Myths and Facts concerning Maria (Lupu) Radziwiłł’s Last Will and Testament. In: Istorija, Lietuvos .... Nr. 97, 1. Vilnius 2015. S. 5–25. PDF
