= Gabriel of Białystok =

Child saint in Orthodox Christianity (1684–1690)

Saint Gabriel of Białystok
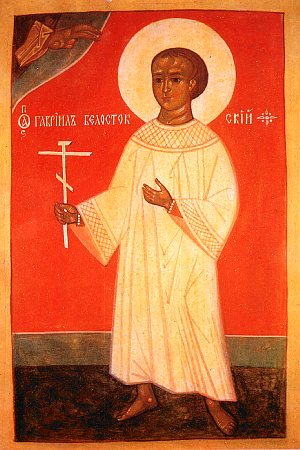
- 19th-century icon

Child Martyr
- Born: April 2, 1684
- Hometown: Zwierki
- Died: May 3, 1690 (aged 6); Białystok, Poland
- Venerated in: Eastern Orthodox Church
- Beatified: 13 March 1820
- Canonized: 13 September 1820
- Feast: 20 April
- Attributes: martyr's cross, white robes
- Patronage: children; sick children

Gabriel of Białystok (Russian: Гавриил Белостокский, romanized: Gavriil Belostoksky; Polish: Gabriel Białostocki), also known as Gabriel of Zabłudów (Polish: Gabriel Zabłudowski; alternatively Gavrila or Gavriil; April 2 [O.S. March 22] 1684 – April 20, 1690), is a child saint in the Eastern Orthodox Church. The story of his death is considered by some authors, especially from the Jewish community, as an example of antisemitic blood libel. His feast day is held on April 20 (of the Julian Calendar, which equates to May 3 of the Gregorian Calendar).

== Biography ==
According to tradition, six-year-old Gabriel was kidnapped from his home in the village of Zwierki (13 km from Zabłudów, Grodno Uezd, Grand Duchy of Lithuania; today's Poland) during the Jewish Passover, while his parents, pious Orthodox Christians Peter and Anastasia Govdel, were working in a nearby field. Shutko, a Jewish arendator of Zverki, was accused of taking the boy to Białystok, piercing him with sharp objects and draining his blood for nine days, before bringing the dead body back to Zverki and dumping it in a local field.

=== Relics and canonisation ===
After the discovery of his body, Gabriel was buried in Zverki, in an area of the local cemetery where child plague-fatalities would later be interred. In a funeral of 1720, the grave was accidentally unearthed and the body was found to be supernaturally incorruptibile; the remains were then transferred to the crypt of Zverki's Orthodox church. Gabriel's cult grew over the years, largely due to reputed healings at his grave. In 1746, the relics were transferred to Zabłudów and then onto various locations. When his relics were transferred in 1755 to the Monastery of the Holy Trinity in Slutsk, in the Minsk Guberniya, a placard related that a Jew had been responsible for his death. His cult developed and spread throughout the Russian Empire, and he was canonized in 1820. He is considered the patron saint of children. In the 1930s the relics were transferred to the Minsk Museum of Atheism. In 1944, they were moved to Grodno, where they stayed until 1992 when they were moved to Białystok (Russian: Свято-Никольский собор), where they remain the focus of pilgrimages.

== Blood libel concerns ==
Some authorities have expressed concern that veneration of Gabriel of Białystok may be used to foment antisemitism. In a 1997 report to the Union of Councils for Soviet Jews (UCSJ), first deputy of the Euro-Asiatic Jewish Congress, Yakov Basin suggested:

Contemporary accounts, which claim that Jews murdered a boy in a ritual manner in order to use his blood, are resurrecting the medieval canard that Jews use the blood of Christian babies for their ritual purposes during pre-Passover days. On April 11, 1690, a few days before the beginning of Passover, 6-year-old Gavril Belostoksky was found murdered and drained of his blood in his village of Zverki, which was at the time a Belarusian town, but is now in Polish territory. Soon thereafter, the accusation that he had been murdered by Jews who needed his blood to bake matzoth was spread throughout Belarus. The libel was bolstered in 1844 in Vladimir Dal's book, Investigation of the Murder of Christian Babies by Jews and the Use of Their Blood. The Russian Orthodox Church canonized Gavril in the 20th century as the patron saint of sick children; he is commemorated in the beginning of each May.

On July 27, 1997, a film depiction of the legend surrounding Gabriel's death was aired on Belarusian television which was criticised by Leonid Stonov as a move to "exploit the topic of blood libel." The revival of the cult in Belarus was cited as an expression of antisemitism in US State Department reports on human rights and religious freedoms, which were passed to the UNHCR.

The autocephalous Orthodox Church in America, operating within the communion of Russian Orthodoxy, has continued commemoration of Gabriel of Bialystok as a child martyr and saint but refer to his assailants only as "evil people" in the kontakion read on his feast day, emphasising "the evil of which fallen man is capable, regardless of ethnicity or creed."

== See also ==
- Antisemitism in the Russian Empire
- List of Russian saints
- Simon of Trent

== Sources ==
- Харкевич, Я.; Черепица, В. Н. (2005). "Гавриил Белостокский". Православная энциклопедия — Т. X: Второзаконие — Георгий. Православная энциклопедия. pp. 200–202. ISBN 5-89572-016-1.
