= Zwierki =

- Village
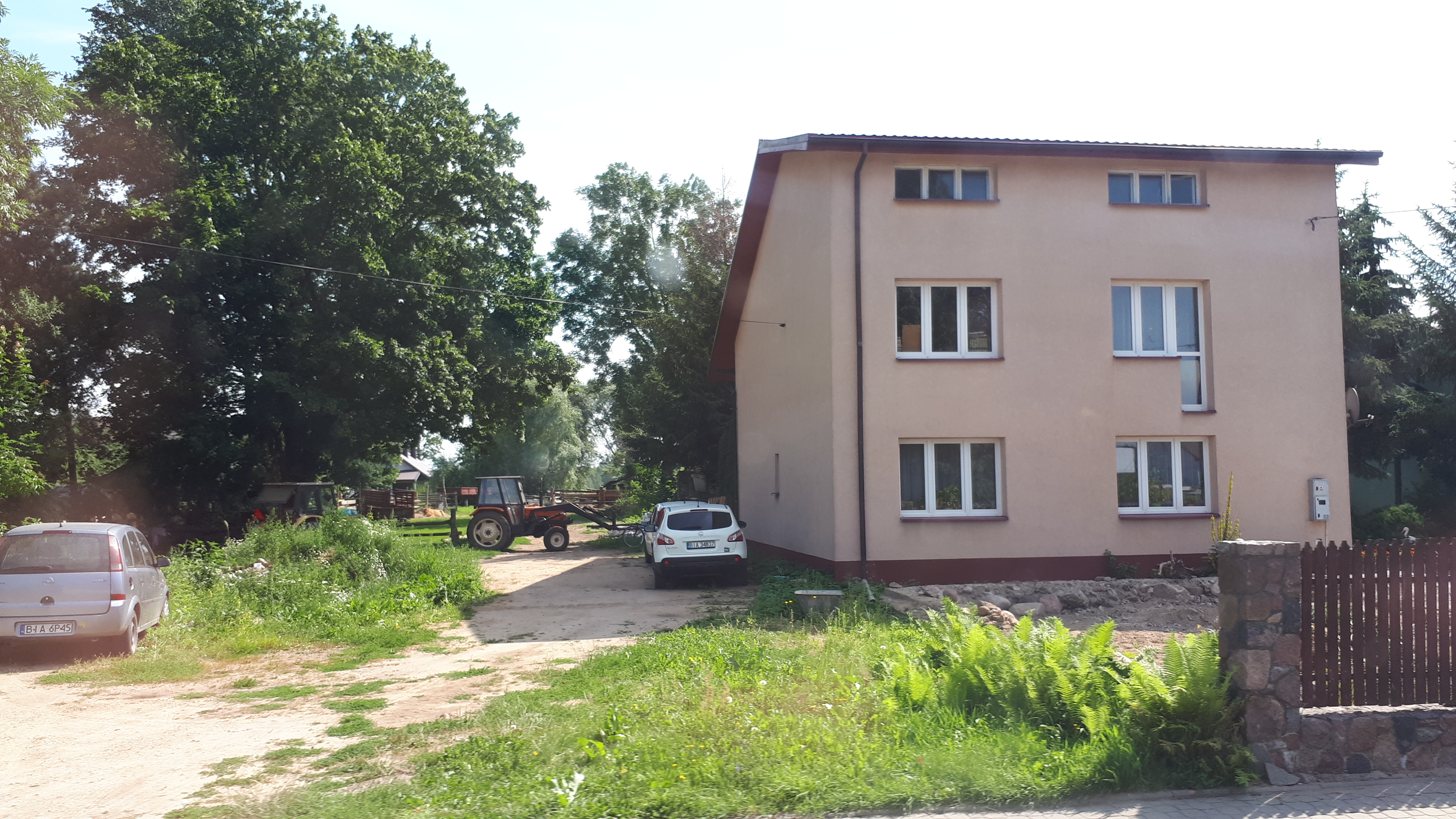

- Location within Poland
- Coordinates: 53°3′N 23°18′E
- Country: Poland
- Voivodeship: Podlaskie
- County: Białystok
- Gmina: Zabłudów
- Population (2021): 329

Zwierki [ˈzvjɛrki] is a village in the administrative district of Gmina Zabłudów, within Białystok County, Podlaskie Voivodeship, in north-eastern Poland.

== History ==
The village was founded in the XVI century.

In the XVIII century there was an Orthodox church in the village, strictly connected to the Monastery of the Dormition of the Mother of God, which was one of the few that did not accept resolutions of the Union of Brest (Zabłudów's church has remained Orthodox after 1596). However, it was destroyed completely in a fire in 1746.

At the end of the XVIII century, Zwierki was a magnate village of the Zabłudów County located in the Grand Duchy of Lithuania, Trakai Voivodeship, Grodno Powiat.

In 1915, most of the Zwierki population (mostly Orthodox Christians) was mass evacuated into the Russian Empire's interior as a part of the bieżeństwo. The return to the village did not begin until after 1918. Only 75% of the former population returned to Zwierki from Russia.

In 1921, the village numbered 38 houses and 203 residents, including 104 Orthodox Christians and 99 Catholics.

In 1923, one of the cells of the Communist Party of Western Belorussia was founded in Zwierki and functioned underground there until the dissolution of the party in 1938.

In 1980, Zwierki had 195 residents who lived in 48 houses (over a dozen of whom lived in the colonies). During those times the settlement had a bidenominational character. The parish seat for both Roman Catholic and Orthodox residents was located in the nearby town of Zabłudów. At this time Zwierki was also bilingual. Older residents of Zwierki used a dialect of the Belarusian language, while the younger and Catholic residents spoke a dialect of Polish.

Between the years of 1954 and 1959, the village was the seat of the Zwierki Gromada. Between 1975 and 1998, the settlement was part of Białystok Voivodeship.

== Notable people ==
- Gabriel of Zabłudów - Orthodox saint
