= Władysław Siciński =

Polish–Lithuanian noble (c. 1615 – c. 1672)

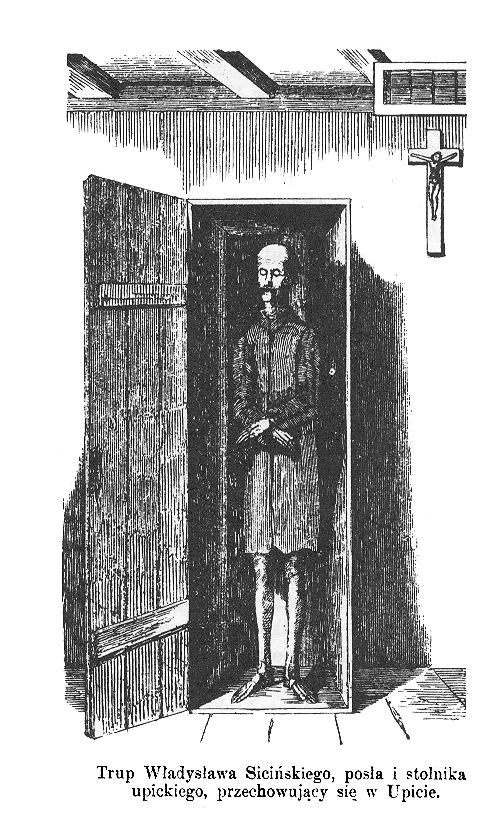
- Mummified body of Siciński, member of parliament from Upytė
- Born: c. 1615
- Died: c. 1672
- Occupations: Nobleman, politician

Władysław Wiktoryn Siciński (Lithuanian: Vladislovas Sicinskis or Čičinskas; c. 1615 – c. 1672) was a member of the Polish–Lithuanian nobility and dignitary of the Polish–Lithuanian Commonwealth. Lord Master-of-the-Table (since 1655) and Lord Vice-Justice (since 1666) of Upytė, he was among the deputies of the Trakai Voivodeship nobility to the Sejm of the Polish–Lithuanian Commonwealth of 1652 which took place during the Khmelnytsky Uprising. He is credited with using the liberum veto for the first time in Polish-Lithuanian history during the Sejm. Some historians have speculated that he might have acted on orders from Janusz Radziwiłł, though Wisner observed there is no evidence to support this theory.

After the partitions of the Polish–Lithuanian Commonwealth, writers searched for causes of the collapse of the state. They blamed Golden Liberty and liberum veto for creating anarchy and disorder that led to the downfall and Siciński, a Protestant and a provincial man, became the villain of history who sacrificed the greater good for his narrow self interests. In 1850s, local residents of Upytė claimed that a certain mummy was the body of Siciński. It was placed in a special cabinet in the local church. After the Uprising of 1863, Governor General of Vilna Mikhail Muravyov-Vilensky ordered the mummy to be secretly buried to quell local superstitions. The order was carried out in August 1865.

== Legend in literature ==
Siciński became legendary as an incredibly cruel landlord in Lithuanian folk legends and is a popular character in Lithuanian and Polish literature. Appearances in fictional works include:

- Adam Mickiewicz, a ballad Popas w Upicie (1825)
- Juljan Mickevicz, Sycynski Poseł Upitski (1828)
- Adam Krechoviecki, Veto (1889)
- Jan Kupiec, a poem Seimelis Jasuose (1904)
- Maironis, a ballad Čičinskas (1919)
- Teofilis Tilvytis, a poem Prasmegęs dvaras (1949)
- Vytautas Misevičius, Čičinskas (1959)
- Juozas Marcinkevičius, a dramatic poem Čičinskas
- Kostas Astrauskas, a drama Čičinskas (1974–1975)
