= Zabłudów =

Town in Podlaskie Voivodeship, Poland

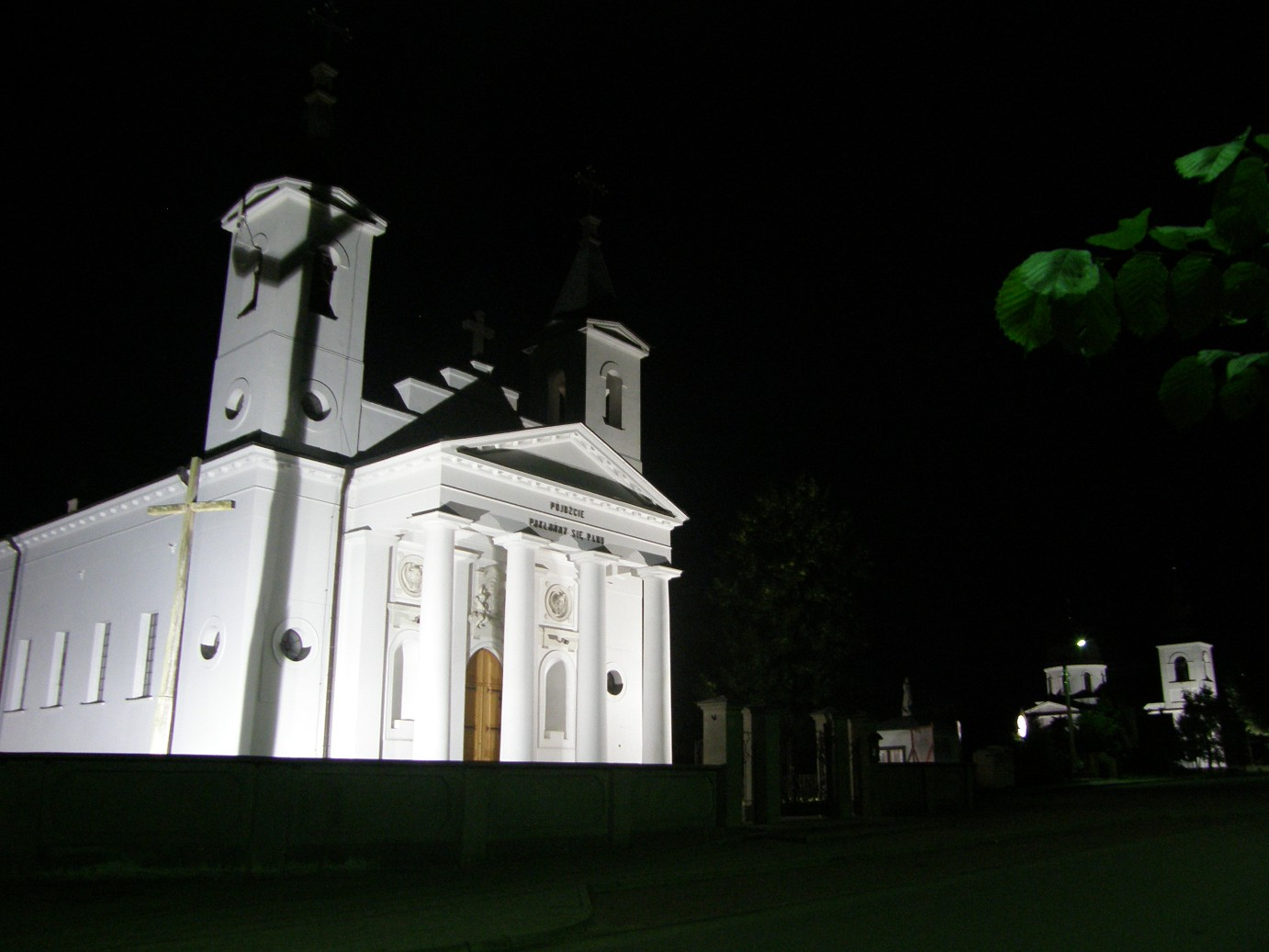
- Zabłudów at night

- Flag Coat of arms

- Location within Poland
- Coordinates: 53°1′N 23°20′E
- Country: Poland
- Voivodeship: Podlaskie
- County: Białystok
- Gmina: Zabłudów
- Founded: 1553
- Town rights: 1553

Area
  - Total: 14.3 km^{2} (5.5 sq mi)

Population (2006)
  - Total: 2,400
  - Density: 170/km^{2} (430/sq mi)
- Time zone: UTC+1 (CET)
  - Summer (DST): UTC+2 (CEST)
- Postal code: 16-060
- Vehicle registration: BIA
- Website: http://um-zabludow.pbip.pl

Zabłudów (Note: Polish pronunciation: [zaˈbwuduf]; Belarusian: Заблудаў, romanized: Zabłudaŭ; Ukrainian: Заблудів, romanized: Zabludiv; Yiddish: זאַבלודאָווע, romanized: Zabludove) is a town in Białystok County, Podlaskie Voivodeship, in north-eastern Poland, seat of Gmina Zabłudów.

== History ==
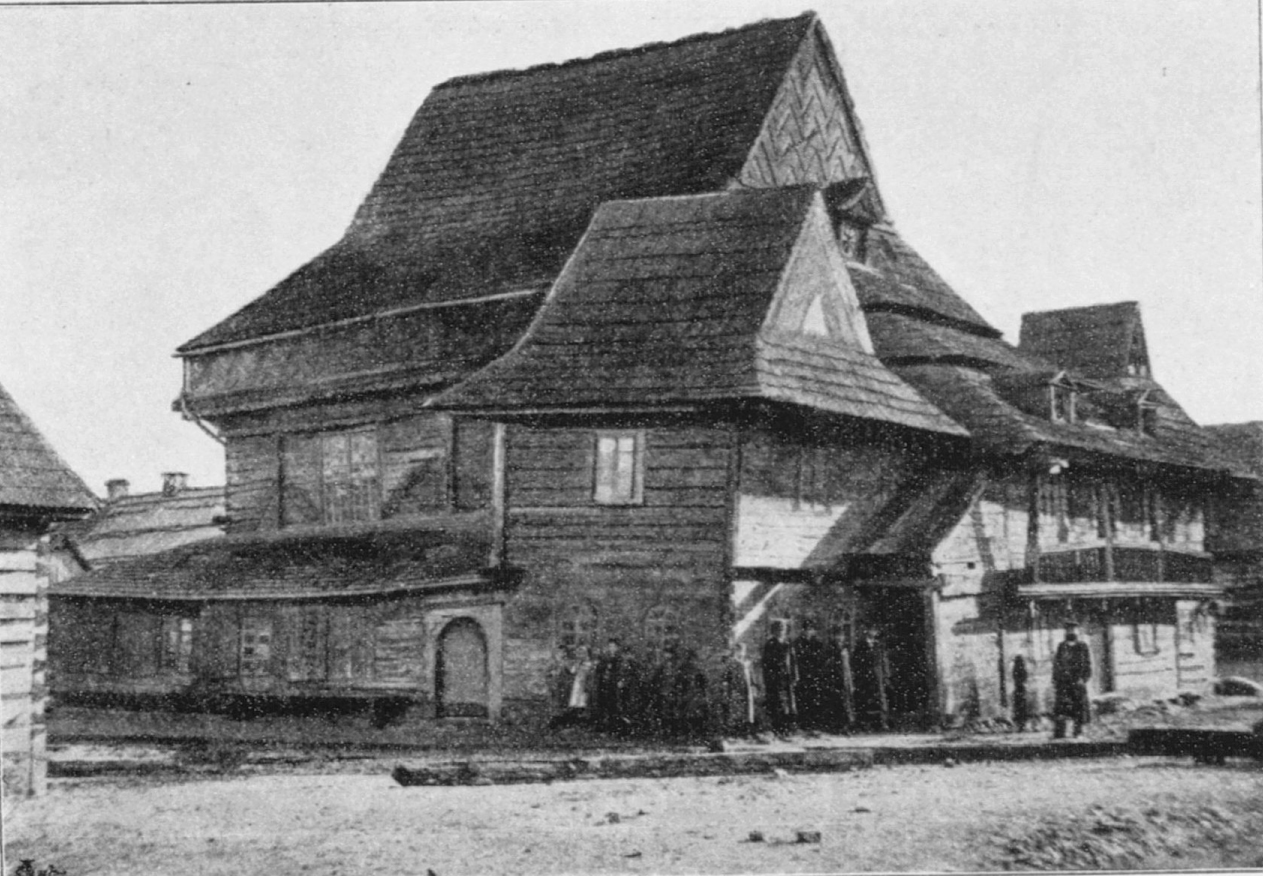
Wooden Synagogue of Zabłudów in 1895

The town of Zabłudów was founded in 1553, it was also granted Magdeburg town rights. An annual fair and weekly market were established. It was a private town which in the late 16th century passed successively to the families of Pac, Sapieha, Leszczyński, Sanguszko, and from 1598 until the beginning of the 19th century it was owned by the Radziwiłł family. In 1567-1568 Hetman Hrehory Chodkiewicz established a printing house in Zabłudów; between 1568 and 1570 Ivan Fedorov and Pyotr Mstislavets produced a Church Slavonic gospel book and a psalter there.

In the 17th century, there were guilds of tailors, shoemakers and potters; agriculture also developed. Also in the 17th century, Protestants, including the Polish Brethren, as well as Jews, settled in the town. In 1654, King John II Casimir Vasa confirmed Zabłudów's town rights and granted the coat of arms. In 1659 during the Russian-Polish War it was destroyed by invading Russian forces.

It was annexed by Prussia during the Third Partition of Poland in 1795. In 1800, the Prussian administration ordered the demolition of the local Catholic church, Germanisation attempts began, in 1803 a German school was founded. In 1807 the town passed to the Russian Partition of Poland. Initially, Polish language was briefly restored to schools and offices, but soon Russification began. The marching Russian troops during the Polish November Uprising in 1831 brought a cholera epidemic. Later, similar to other cities in the region such as Białystok and Supraśl, the textile industry developed.

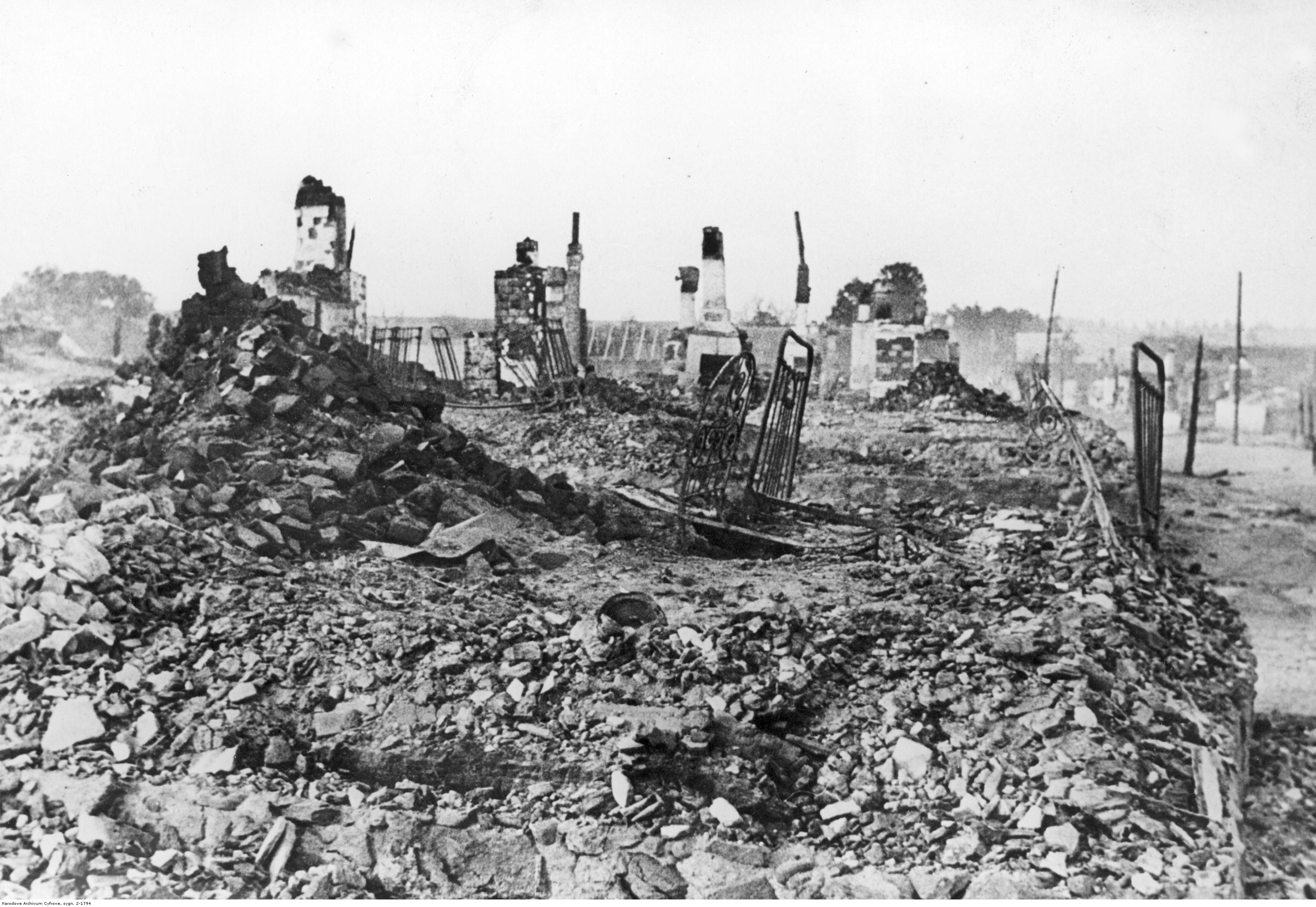
A destroyed part of Zabłudów during the occupation of Poland (1939–1945)

The town was home to a thriving Jewish community for hundreds of years. It was once the location of the notable Zabłudów Synagogue, a wooden synagogue of a type unique to the Polish–Lithuanian Commonwealth, built in 1637. A replica of the Zabłudów synagogue was made in 2004 at the University of Wisconsin in the course study.

During World War II, Zabłudów was occupied by the Soviets from 1939 to 1941 and by Nazi Germany from 1941 to 1944. On 23 June 1941, during their retreat, the Russians committed a massacre of 15 Poles in the vicinity of Zabłudów. Upon entering Zabłudów, the Germans burned part of the town, destroying the Zabłudów Synagogue in June 1941, and in July 1941, they created a ghetto for some 1,800 Polish Jews from the vicinity. On 2 November 1942, the ghetto was liquidated by Germans and the Blue Police and approximately 1,400 Jews were transported by Holocaust trains to the 10th Cavalry camp near Białystok and from there to the Treblinka extermination camp on November 10. All were gassed that day. A few dozen managed to hide from the ghetto roundup, though most of those were found and shot. Several local Polish and Belarusian families did shelter some Jews, but in May, 1945, seven of the ten survivors were shot by an armed Polish gang.

Prior to 1999 it was part of the Białystok Voivodeship.

== Demographics ==
Historical population

Year	Pop.	±%
1857	3,000	—
1871	3,200	+6.7%
1890	4,000	+25.0%
1897	3,772	−5.7%
1910	4,000	+6.0%

Year	Pop.	±%
1921	2,861	−28.5%
1931	3,158	+10.4%
1939	3,850	+21.9%
1950	1,120	−70.9%
1960	1,331	+18.8%

== Points of interest ==
- Classicist Church of Saints Peter and Paul at the market square built in 1805-1840
- Eastern Orthodox Church of Virgin Mary at the main square built between 1847–1855
- Chapel of Saint Roch, built in the 18th century
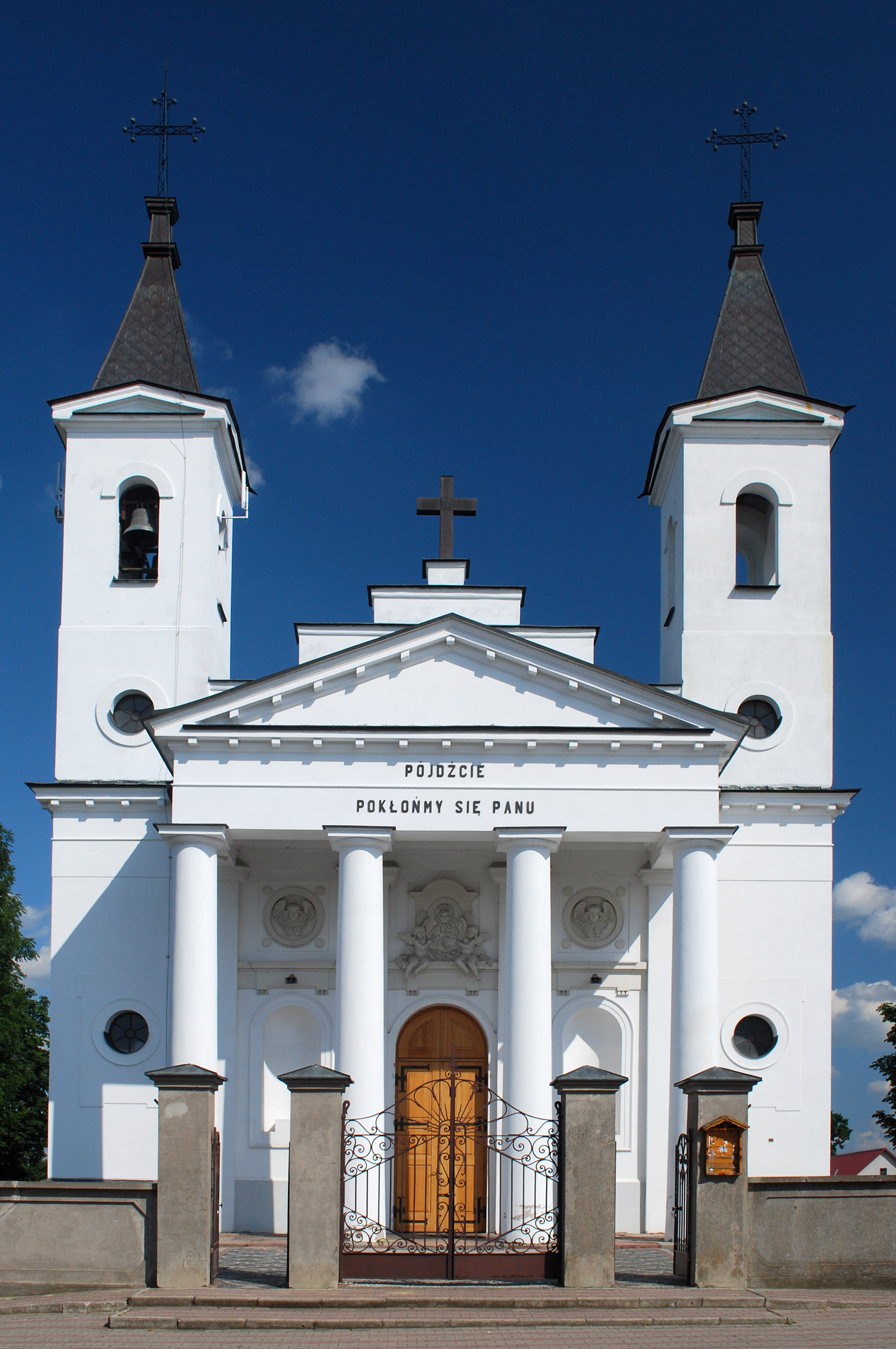
Classicist Church of Saints Peter and Paul

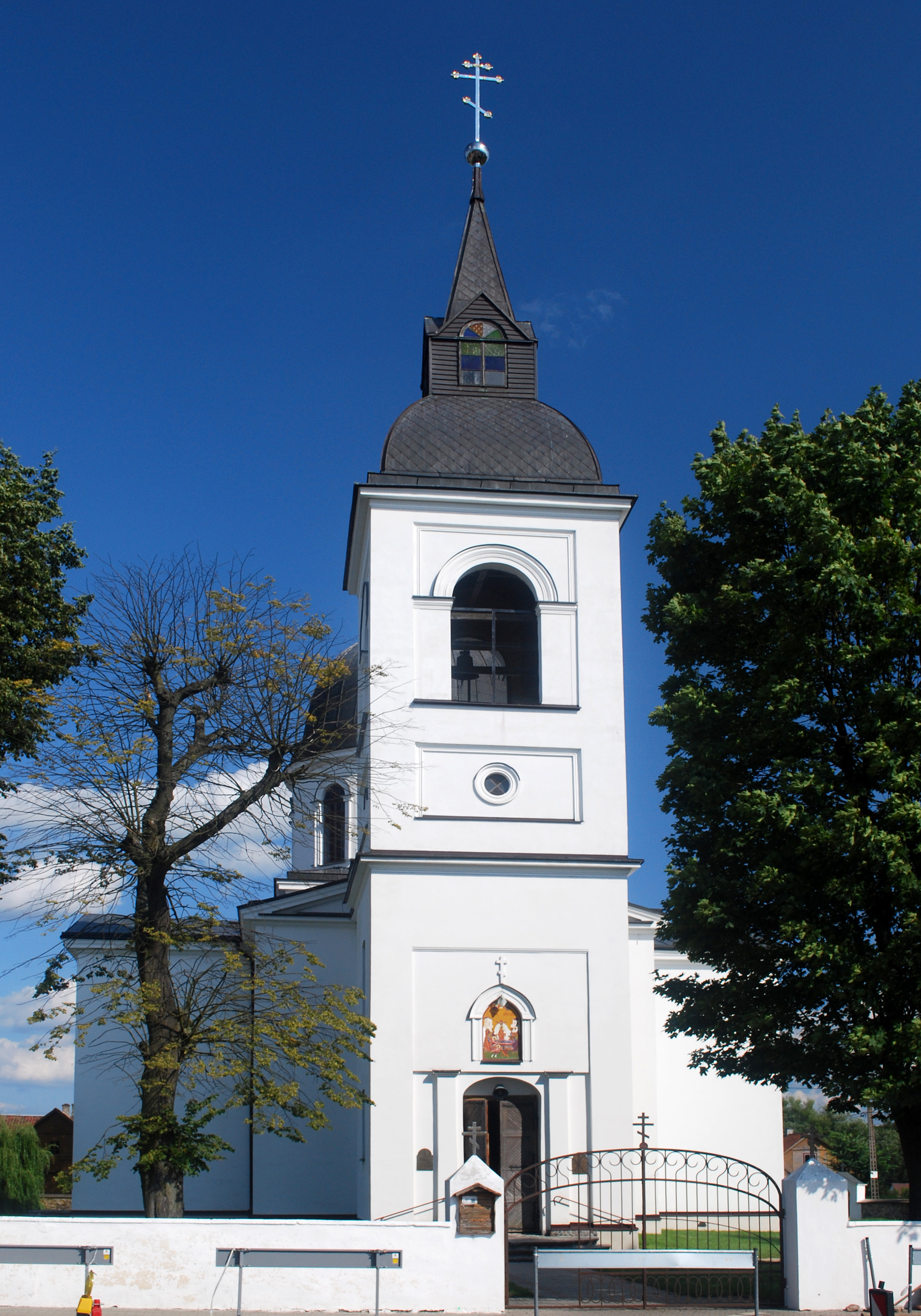
Eastern Orthodox Church of Virgin Mary

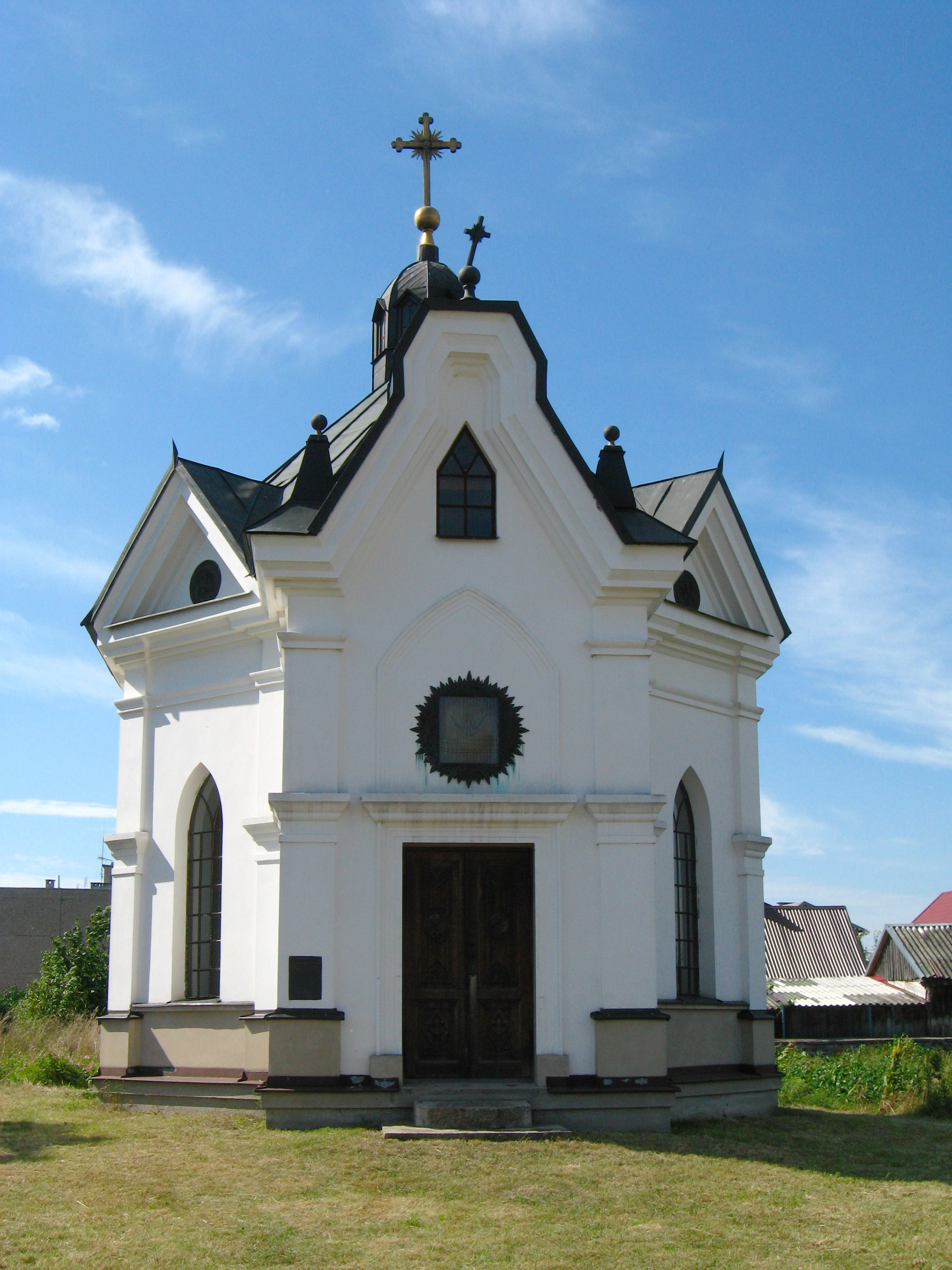
Chapel of Saint Roch

== See also ==
- Monastery of the Dormition of the Mother of God, Zabłudów
