= Soldan family =

Moldavian noble family

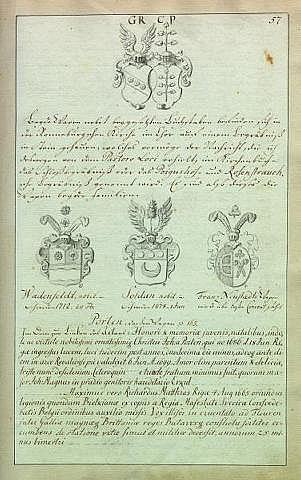
Soldan family coat of arms (in the middle)

The House of Soldan (also spelled Söldán, Șoldan) was an old noble family in medieval Moldavia. In the 16th and 17th centuries, members of the family assumed important offices within the princely chancellery of the principality.

== Origins ==
The family is mentioned for the first time in Romanian documents in a charter from 22 September 1411, when the sons of Soldan the Old receive from the prince of Moldavia important feudal domains on the Șomuz valley. In the charter, Alexander the Good offers to Peter Soldan, his wife (the daughter of boyar Ghiulea Capitaneus, captain of the Moldavian army) and to his brother, Miclaus, the Tatar slave villages at Tamârtășăuți on the Șomuz. The estate is called from that moment onwards Șoldănești. At the same time, Peter and Miclaus Soldan are the first known slave owners in Moldavia in Wallachia. Later on, the family receives numerous privileges and lands, holding estates in Neamț, Suceava, Botoșani and Bessarabia.

Nicolae Iorga believes that the Soldan family were originally Hungarian nobles who settled in Moldavia from Transylvania together with the first prince of independent Moldavia, Bogdan I, and then Romanised their name. Historians Radu Rosetti and Gheorghe Ghibănescu also argue that in the charter from 1411 the family name is written before the first name, this being a custom only in Hungarian documents. Moreover, the first name of Peter’s brother, Miclaus, could come from the Hungarian form of Nicholas, which is Miklós. Rosetti is thus convinced that the Soldans were Hungarians from the Maramureș region. However, noble families with the name Soldan can also be found in Prussia and Sweden, so a possible German origin of the family should not be excluded. The family might have first become Hungarian in Maramureș and then Romanian in Moldavia.

The family’s seal and coat of arms is represented by a lion.

== Family members and alliances ==
For about four centuries, the Soldan family was one of the most important aristocratic (boyar) families in Moldavia. Important members of the family were Pătrașco Șoldan, Great Chancellor of Moldavia; Dumitrașco Șoldan, Great Vornic; Vasile Șoldan, Great Treasurer of Moldavia. Through marriage alliances, the family connected with princely families such as Racoviță, Lupu, Cantacuzino and Movilă.

Dumitru Șoldan was Vornic (administrator of justice) in the time of prince Petru Rareș, being one of his closest boyars. The proof is the financial support Dumitru offered to the prince in order to build Probota monastery, Petru Rareș’ princely necropolis. In 1530, as it is written in the monastery’s inauguration charter, Dumitru paid for the princely house located within the monastery and for one of the towers.

Pătrașco Soldan, Great Logothete (Great Chancellor) of Moldavia between 1603 and 1610, was probably the son of Dumitru Șoldan and he was married to Antimia, related to the Greek noble Gheorghe Kataratos. They had together eight children: Anghelina, Teofana (married in the princely family Racoviță), Dumitrașco, Toderașco, Candachia, Catrina (married with the Great Treasurer Iordache Cantacuzino), Todoșca, and Tudosia (married to the Chief of Soroca). Appointed Great Logothete by prince Ieremia Movilă, Pătrașco supports after his death the accession to the throne of Ieremia’s son, Constantin. Despite his very young age, Constantin is elected prince with the help of Pătrașco.

Dumitrașco Șoldan, Pătrașco’s son, has held some of the most important offices of the Moldavian medieval state. He was appointed Steward between 1626-1631, High Steward from 1632 onwards, Great Spătar (Great Master of Ceremonies and Commander in Chief of the Army), Great Vornic of the Lower Country between 1636-1641 and Great Treasurer from 1642 until his death. He increased the prestige of his family even further by marrying princess Safta Caraiman, whose mother was a direct descendant of prince Stephen the Great. Together they had three children: Alexandra, Tofana, and Stephen, who would become Vornic of Moldavia under prince Vasile Lupu. During his time as Great Vornic, Dumitrașco grants Vasile Lupu estates in the county of Suceava in order to support the first princely academy at Trei Ierarhi in Iași. Moreover, together with princess Safta, he built the defence walls of Bisericani monastery in 1631 and the ceremony house and a tower at Pângărați monastery in 1642. After their deaths, they were buried at their estate in Șoldănești.

Dumitrașco Soldan was also one of Vasile Lupu’s most trustworthy diplomats and military commanders. In 1637, Vasile Lupu invades Wallachia, ruled by his rival, Matei Basarab. Fearful that Vasile Lupu might take over Wallachia and then aim at Transylvania, George I Rákóczi helps Wallachia to reject Lupu’s attack. Seeing that the two princes allied against him, Vasile Lupu fears an invasion from the West, so he sends Dumitrașco Șoldan to protect the border with Transylvania and he is appointed Protector of Oituz fortress, with a high strategic value. Rákóczi quits his attack plans and, one year later, he seeks peace with both Romanian princes. Vornic Dumitrașco Șoldan was sent as Moldavia’s chief peace negotiator with the mission to close an alliance with the prince of Transylvania. Even if the peace negotiations between Moldavia and Wallachia fail, Rákóczi agrees with the alliance between him and Vasile Lupu, pledging to help each other in case of foreign invasions.

Toderașco Șoldan, Dumitrașco’s brother, was appointed Logothete in Moldova’s Chancellery in 1635 and he was later made Vornic of Botoșani between 1639-1642, being the first boyar with this title.

Candachia Șoldan was the wife of Costea Bucioc, Moldavia’s chief military commander who fought with the Poles against Ottoman rule. After the defeat at the Battle of Cecora in 1620, he was taken prisoner and impaled by the Turks. Their daughter, Tudoșca Costea Șoldan, was the first wife of prince Vasile Lupu. In their turn, Todoșca Costea Șoldan and Vasile Lupu had two daughters: Maria, married to the Polish prince Janusz Radziwiłł, Court Chamberlain of Lithuania and Voivode of Vilna Voivodeship; and Ruxandra, mother of Catrina, married into the former Byzantine imperial family of the Cantacuzino.

== Downfall ==
In Descriptio Moldavie, a chronicle of Moldavia, prince Dimitrie Cantemir mentions all seventy five noble families representing the ruling class of Moldavia, the Șoldans still being among them at the beginning of the 18th century. Indeed, in the late 17th-early 18th centuries, members of the Șoldan family were still holding important offices within the country’s government: Toderașcu Șoldan was Vornic of Botoșani; Ștefan Șoldan was Treasurer; Simion Șoldan was Vornic; Nicolae Șoldan was Postelnic (Chamberlain). However, as the Phanariot regime was imposed by the Ottoman rule, local elites started to be oppressed and old boyar families begin to decay.

In 1717, in the context of an Austro-Turkish war, Moldavian noblemen are forced to choose between Ottoman rule, represented by prince Mihai Racoviță, and a western, Christian governance within the Holy Roman Empire which desired an expansion eastward. Chamberlain Nicolae Șoldan, together with two other high-ranking boyars and with the support of the Austrian army, start a riot against Racoviță. Many young noblemen, oriented towards the West rather than towards the Ottoman Empire, joined the rebellion against the Moldavian prince. However, the riot was crushed. In a last attempt to force Racoviță to abandon the throne, Nicolae Șoldan kidnaps his sister and sends her to Kronstadt as the prisoner of the Austrian army. Racoviță captures the rebels, including Nicolae Șoldan, who is considered to be the leader of the rebellion. Even if he is left alive, his entire property is seized, including the ancestral estate of Dulcești, owned by the Șoldans for at least two centuries. After this episode, local noble families, already despised by the Ottomans after the attempt of prince Constantin Brâncoveanu to ally himself with the Habsburgs and of prince Dimitrie Cantemir to ally with the Russians, are beginning to rapidly decline, being replaced with Greek nobles from Constantinople. At the end of the 18th century, the Șoldans were completely removed from Moldavian power circles.
