= Janusz Radziwiłł (1612–1655) =

Polish–Lithuanian magnate

Janusz II Radziwiłł
- Prince; Grand Hetman of Lithuania
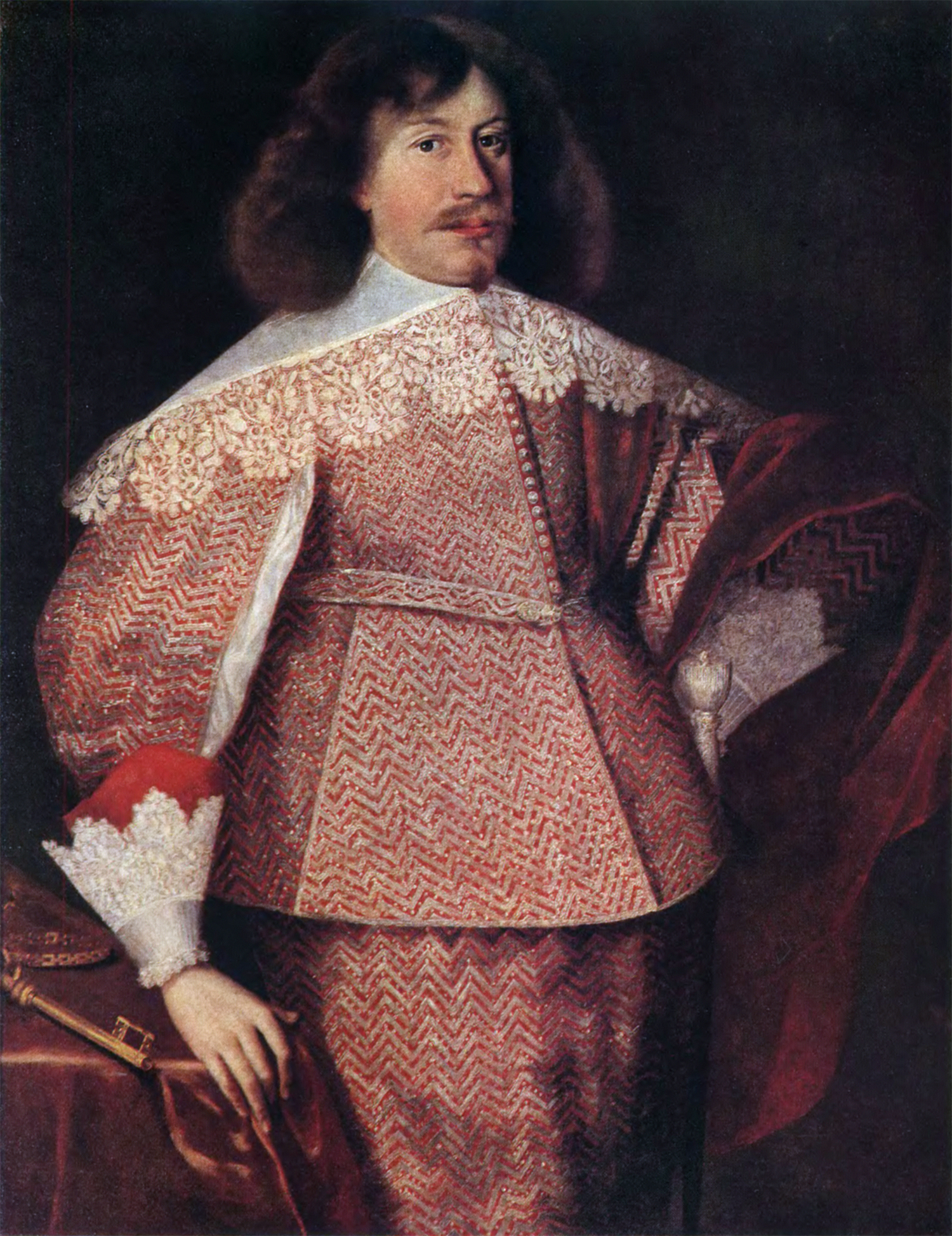
- Portrait by Bartholomeus Strobel, 1634

- Coat of arms
- Born: 2 December 1612; Papilys near Birże, Polish–Lithuanian Commonwealth
- Died: 31 December 1655 (aged 43); Tykocin, Polish–Lithuanian Commonwealth
- Buried: Kėdainiai
- Noble family: Radziwiłł
- Spouses: Katarzyna Potocka; Maria Lupu
- Issue: with Katarzyna Potocka: Anna Maria Radziwiłł
- Father: Krzysztof Radziwiłł
- Mother: Anna Kiszka

Prince Janusz Radziwiłł, also known as Janusz the Second or Janusz the Younger (Lithuanian: Jonušas Radvila,Belarusian: Януш Радзівіл, 2 December 1612 – 31 December 1655) was a noble and magnate in the Polish–Lithuanian Commonwealth. Throughout his life he occupied a number of posts in the state administration, including that of Court Chamberlain of Lithuania (from 1633), Field Hetman of Lithuania (from 1646) and Grand Hetman of Lithuania (from 1654). He was also a voivode of Vilna Voivodeship (from 1653), as well as a starost of Samogitia, Kamieniec, Kazimierz and Sejwy. He was a protector of the Protestant religion in Lithuania and sponsor of many Protestant schools and churches.

For several decades, the interests between the Radziwłł family and the state (Polish–Lithuanian Commonwealth) had begun to drift apart, as the Radziwiłłs increased their magnate status and wealth. Their attempts to acquire more political power in the Grand Duchy of Lithuania culminated in the doings of Janusz Radziwiłł, who is remembered in Polish historiography as one of the Grand Duchy nobles responsible for the end of the Golden Age of the Commonwealth.

In his times he was one of the most powerful people in the Commonwealth, often described as a de facto ruler of the entire Grand Duchy of Lithuania. During the Deluge, the Swedish invasion of Poland-Lithuania during the Second Northern War, he sided with the Swedish king signing the Treaty of Kėdainiai and the Union of Kėdainiai. This move however antagonised him with most of other nobles, including members of his own family. His forces were eventually defeated in battle and he himself died in a besieged castle at Tykocin.

== Early life ==
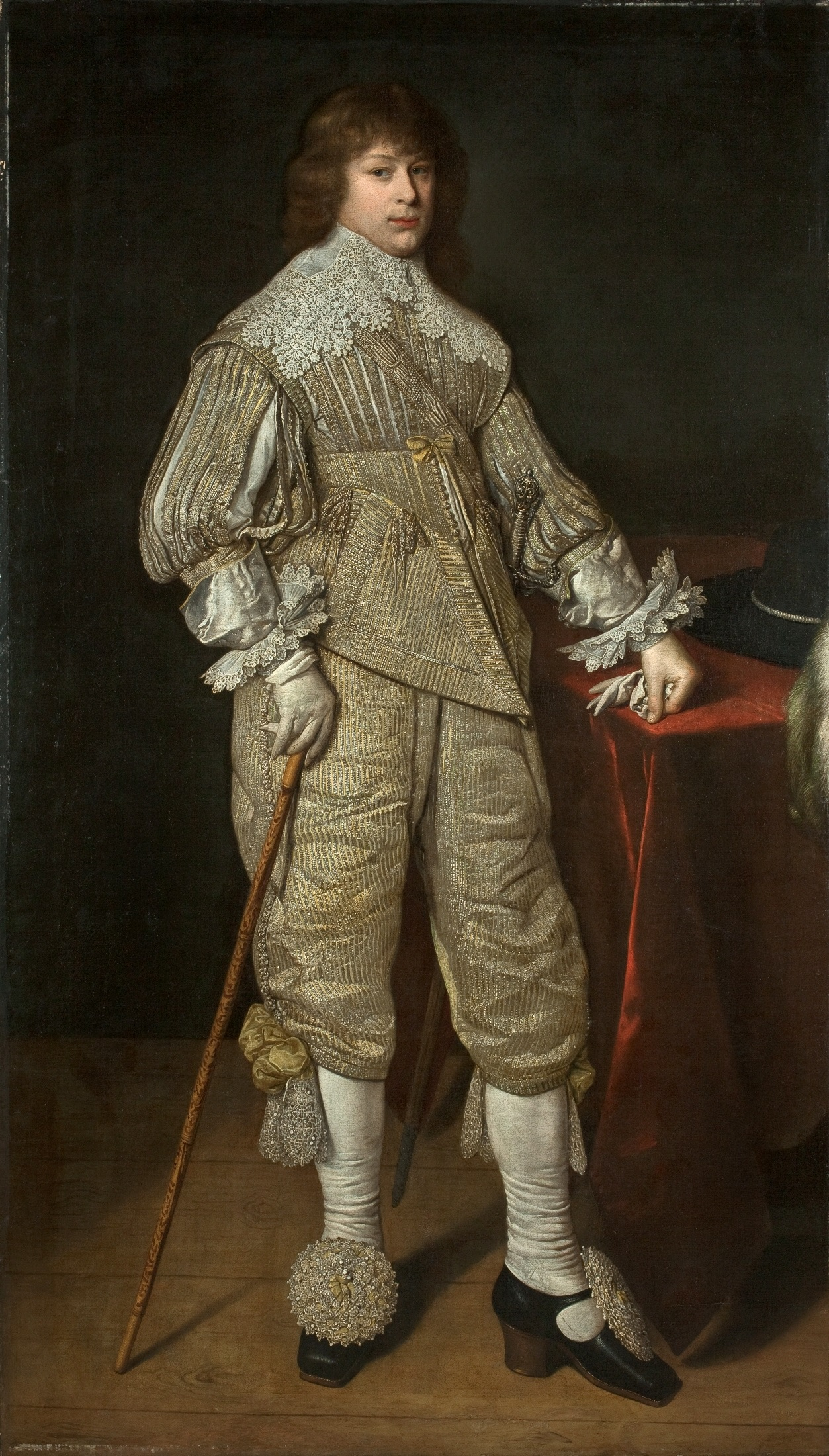
Portrait by David Bailly, 1632

He was born on 2 December 1612 in Papilys (Popiela). He was heir to one of the most powerful of princely Polish–Lithuanian families, the Radziwiłł family.

In September 1628 he departed for a four-year-long voyage, primarily in Germany and the Netherlands, returning to the Commonwealth's capital of Warsaw by autumn 1632. This included studying law and theology for two years in Leipzig University. Soon afterward the new king of the Commonwealth, Władysław IV Vasa, sent him with a diplomatic mission to the Netherlands and England. As a reward, he received his first governmental office, becoming the podkomorzy (Court Chamberlain) of Lithuania in early 1633. He took part in the Smolensk War in 1634, through he primarily accompanied the king, and did not participate actively in major combats. He became a regular part of Władysław IV Waza's company, spending much time at the royal court over the next five years. In 1635 he became the starost of Kamieniec, and in 1638, Kazimierz Dolny (near Lublin). Since 1636 he administered his family's estates, through not very efficiently, which he admitted himself. He also attended most of the Sejm (Commonwealth's parliament) sessions.

He married a Katarzyna Potocka on 2 February 1638. He was a Calvinist, and his wife, Catholic, though this did not cause significant difficulties. They had three children, though only their daughter Anna Maria, born in 1640, survived to adulthood. Katarzyna died on 21 November 1642. In 1645 he married Maria Lupu, daughter of a Moldavian voivod Vasile Lupu.

== Rise to power ==
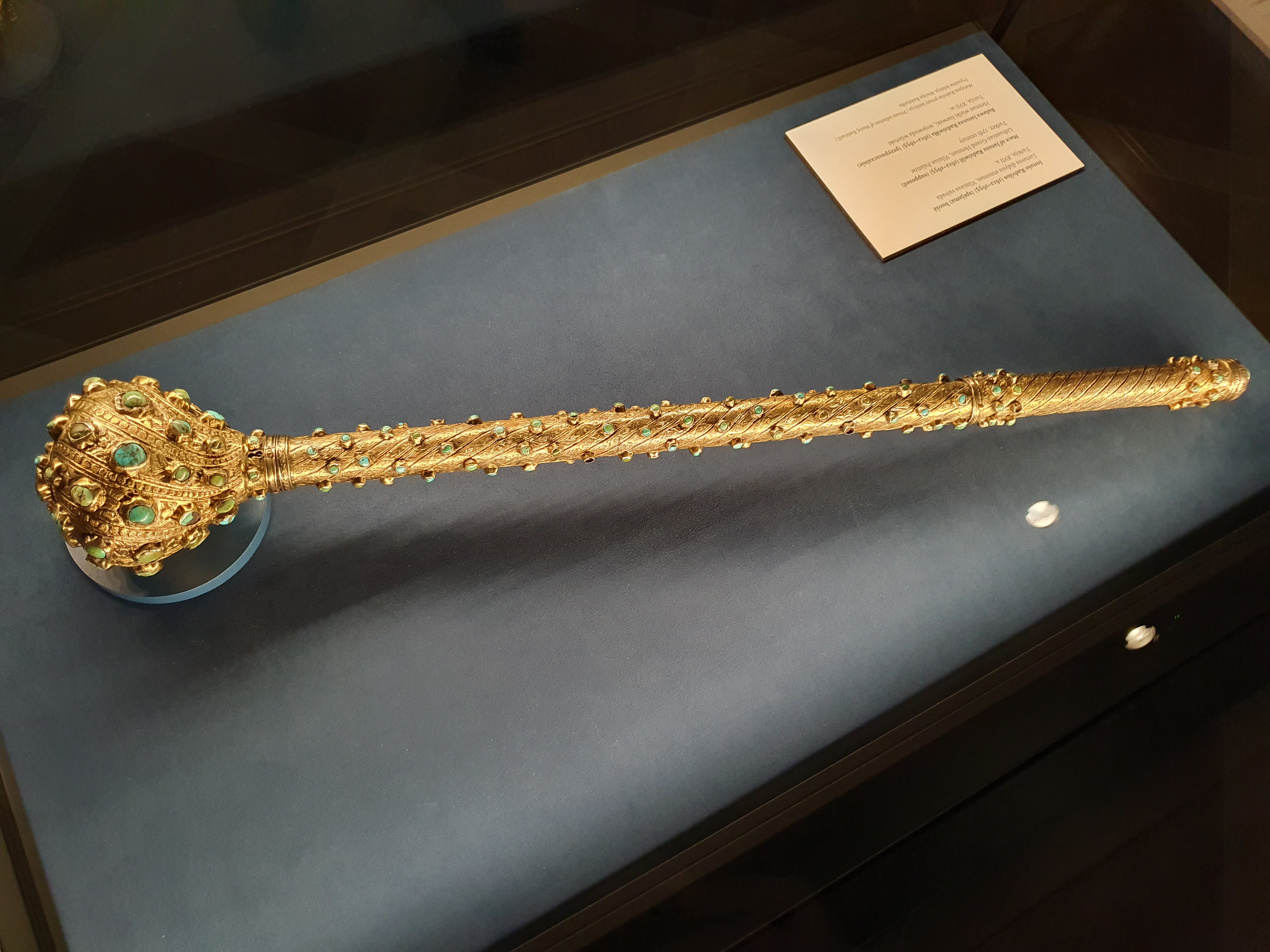
Mace of Janusz Radziwiłł (17th c.)

The death of his father in 1641 made him one of the wealthiest magnates in the entire Commonwealth. In 1646 he became a member of the senate of Poland, as he an important office that granted him this privilege: in April that year, he became the Field Hetman of Lithuania. Later, in November, he also received another prestigious title, that of a starost of Samogitia. In 1648 he was elected to the Lithuanian Tribunal. Later that year, the Commonwealth suffered two drastic events: death of king Władysław (succeeded by John II Casimir Vasa), and the beginning of the Khmelnytsky Uprising. In February 1649 he commanded the Commonwealth forces in the victorious Battle of Mazyr, and in July, at Battle of Loyew. Fighting resumed in 1651, and Radziwiłł was once again victorious, commanding the Lithuanian forces at the Second Battle of Loyew in July, capture of Kiev on 4 August, and the Battle of Bila Tserkva in September.

In 1652 a liberum veto was invoked in the Sejm by Władysław Siciński, forcing it to disband. Some historians have speculated that Siciński might have acted on orders from Janusz Radziwiłł, through Wisner observed there is no evidence to support this theory.

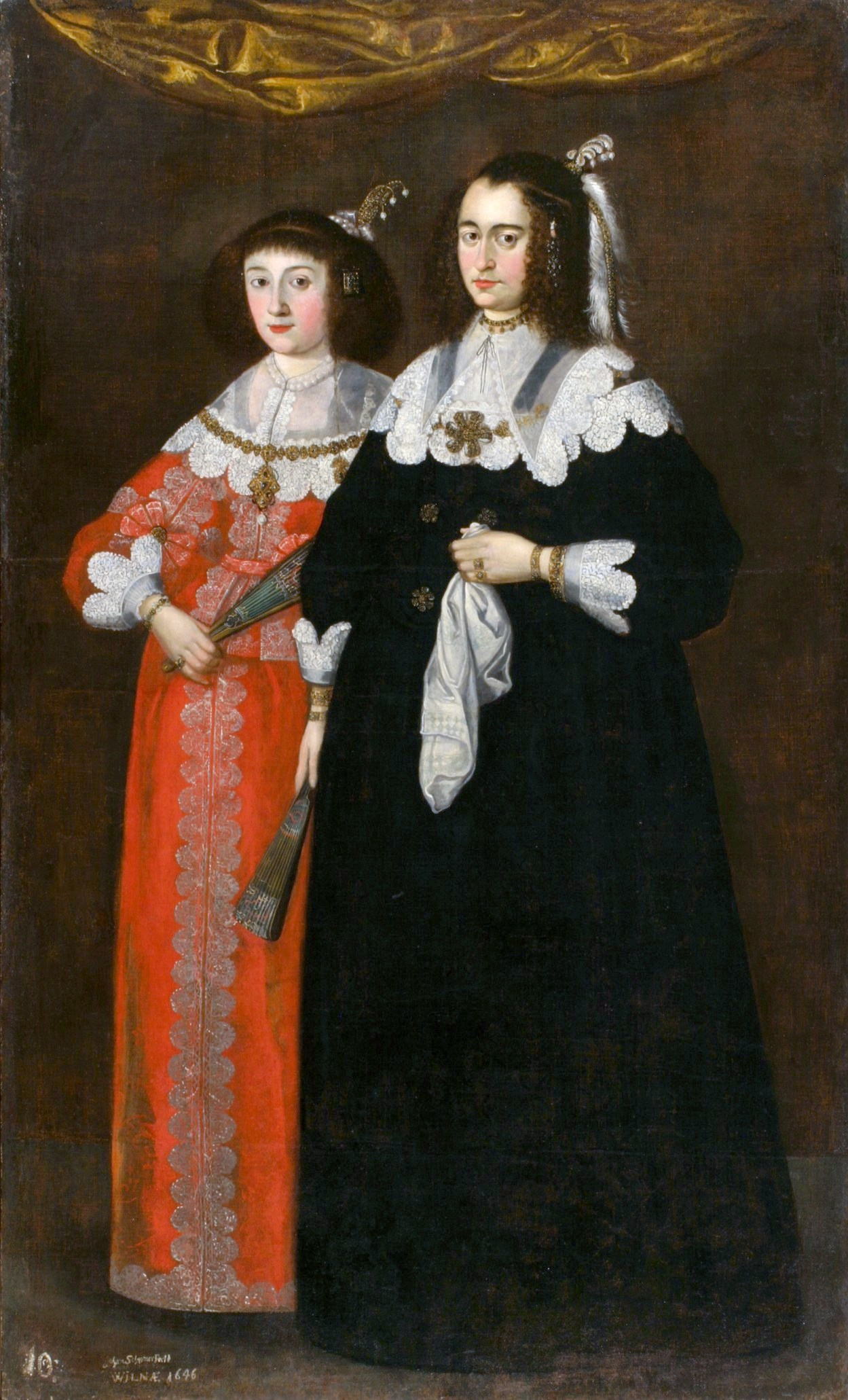
Portrait of two wives of Janusz Radziwiłł, 1640s

In 1653 the Cossacks allied themselves with Russia, and in turn, Russian forces invaded the Commonwealth from the east. In March that year Janusz received the office of voivode of Wilno. On 17 June 1654 Janusz was elevated from the Field Hetman position to the Grand Hetman of Lithuania. Despite the nominations, relations between him and the king have been worsening. In late August 1654 Janusz Radziwiłł defeated invading Russians at the Battle of Shklow, but this was his last victory. Days later he was defeated by the Russians at the Battle of Shepeleviche. The following winter Lithuanian counter-offensive proved unsuccessful; with the inconclusive Siege of Mahylyow.

== Union with Sweden ==
Janusz Radziwiłł trust in the Poles was damaged during the Battle of Vilnius in 1655 when he, being the Great Hetman of the Grand Duchy of Lithuania, had to defend the Grand Duchy's capital Vilnius from the approaching Tsardom of Russia forces. When a large Russian army approached Vilnius (at least 41,000 men), Janusz Radziwiłł could muster just 5,000 to 7,000 men. The morale was further damaged by the order of king John II Casimir Vasa to royal troops (about 5,000 men) to retreat to Marienburg. City residents began hasty evacuations. Most valued treasures, including the coffin of Saint Casimir, main books of Lithuanian Metrica, and valuables from Vilnius Cathedral, were transported outside the city.

Janusz Radziwiłł took up defensive position on the northern shore of the Neris river near the present-day Green Bridge to cover the evacuations. The battle started around 6 a.m. on 8 August 1655 and lasted the whole day. The Lithuanians managed to capture three Russian flags. At night, the Lithuanian army split into two groups that retreated to Vilkaviškis and to Kėdainiai. The garrison of the Vilnius Castle Complex surrendered two days later. The invading forces plundered the city and murdered its inhabitants for several days. A fire consumed part of the city. Tsar Alexis of Russia arrived to the city on 14 August. The city was so badly devastated that he could not find suitable accommodations in the city and instead built a large tent in Lukiškės.

With the war against Russia still ongoing, the Commonwealth suddenly had to face a new enemy. In June 1655 Swedish forces started to advance across the northern territories of the Commonwealth. The Swedish invasion of Polish–Lithuanian Commonwealth, part of the Second Northern War, is known in Lithuanian history as the Deluge. Together with his cousin Bogusław Radziwiłł, Janusz began talks with Swedish king Charles X Gustav of Sweden, discussing how to reverse the Union of Lublin which created the Commonwealth. Janusz first declared the Grand Duchy a Swedish protectorate in the Treaty of Kėdainiai on 17 August 1655, then the brothers signed another treaty on 20 October according to which the Swedish–Lithuanian union was founded, and in which Radziwiłł's were to rule a part of the Grand Duchy.

Janusz was not alone in abandoning the Polish side and acting in favour of the Lithuanian raison d'état; many Polish nobles, such as Deputy Chancellor of the Crown Hieronim Radziejowski and Grand Treasurer of the Crown Bogusław Leszczyński, believing that John II Casimir was a weak king or a Jesuit-king, encouraged Charles Gustav to claim the Polish crown. John II Casimir had few friends among the Polish szlachta, as he openly sympathized with Austria and showed disregard and contempt for the Commonwealth. Poznań Voivode Krzysztof Opaliński surrendered Greater Poland to Charles Gustav, and soon other voivodes followed.

Although much of the Commonwealth, including Warsaw, Kraków, and the western portions of the Grand Duchy, were taken by the Swedes, King John II Casimir and his allies were able to regain power after a few years starting with the Jasna Góra resistance and the Tyszowce Confederation. The Swedish defeat and eventual retreat from the territories of the Commonwealth spelled an abrupt end for the plans of Janusz and Bogusław. Janusz died in Tykocin, besieged by loyal Commonwealth forces (desperate Swedish defenders later blew themselves up).

== Legacy ==
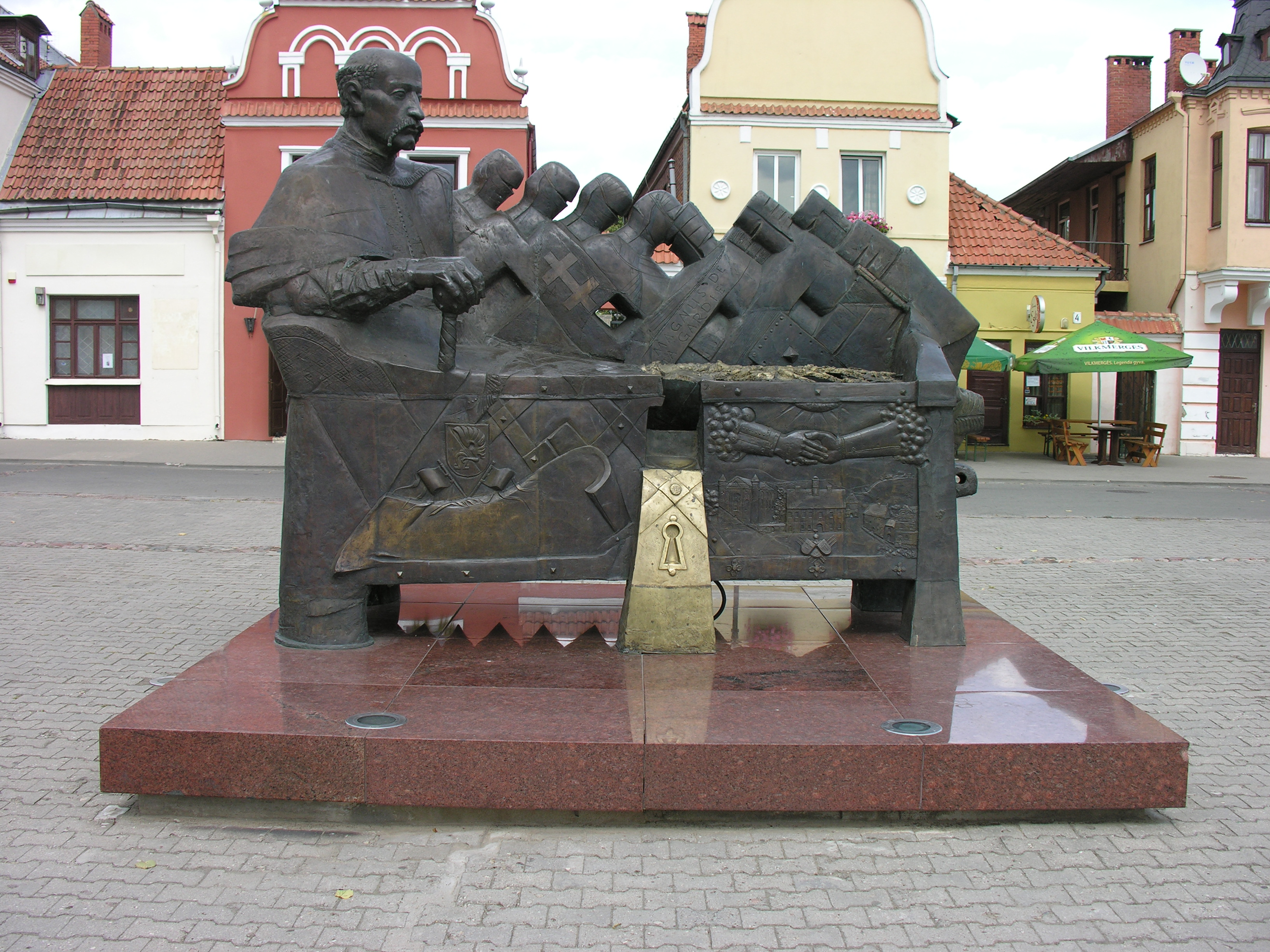
A monument to Janusz Radziwiłł in Kėdainiai, Lithuania

Janusz Radziwiłł is ill-remembered in Polish popular culture, particularly due to the negative portrayal of his supposed treason and alliance with Swedes during the Deluge by Polish 19th century Nobel Prize winner, Henryk Sienkiewicz. Sienkiewicz, in his Trilogy, wrote about Radziwiłł's death: "Earthly ruin, a fallen soul, darkness, nothingness-that is all he managed to attain as a reward for service to himself".

In Lithuania Janusz Radziwiłł (Jonušas Radvila) is remembered favourably as prominent patron of Lithuanian press and defender of Lithuanian interest.

Janusz Radziwiłł (1612–1655) is portrayed prominently as Hetman by Władysław Hańcza, in the movie-epic The Deluge by Jerzy Hoffman.
