= List of wooden synagogues =

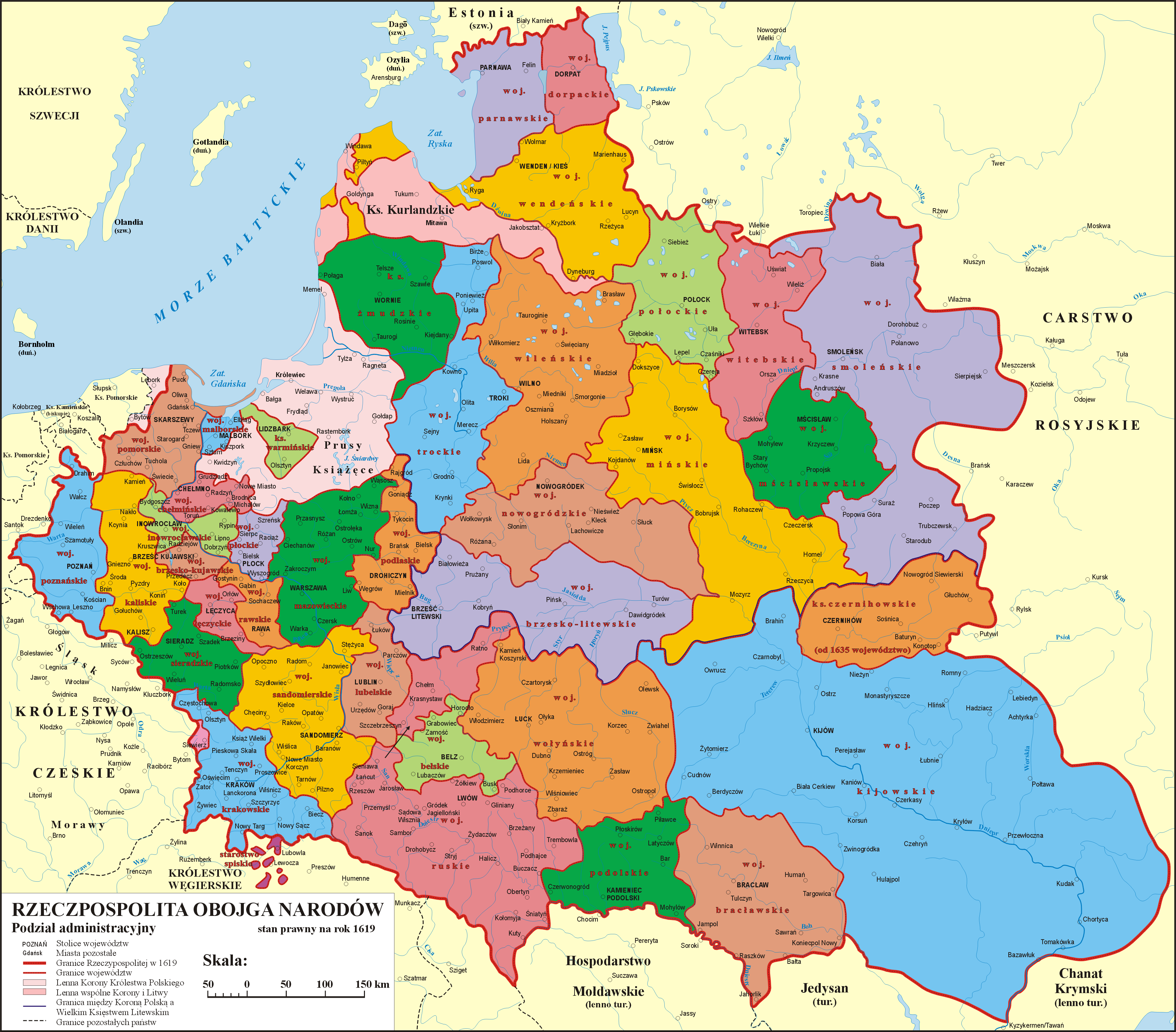
Polish-Lithuanian Commonwealth in 1619

The list of wooden synagogues shows destroyed and extant synagogues, the builders of which adapted an architecture traditional in Central and Eastern Europe to the requirements of Jewish worship. All the large, representative wooden synagogues were destroyed by the end of World War II. Today only a few simple wooden synagogues exist, most of them in Lithuania. Synagogues that no longer exist are recorded as far as they are more precisely known from drawings or photographs.

If years are given in italics, then these are approximate values.

The use of wood as a building material for synagogues was obvious in a wooded region; churches were also initially built as wooden structures. However, a synod in Piotrków in the 16th century demanded that synagogues always be made of wood, not stone, so that stone buildings for Jewish communities were only possible with special permission. Wooden synagogues remained the norm at a time when Christian churches were mostly built as stone. The political space in which wooden synagogues with typical construction features and painting patterns developed was the Poland-Lithuania Commonwealth (1569–1795), in which the Jewish Council of the Four Lands existed (1580–1764).

== List by country and place ==
=== Belarus ===
| Place and region | Synagogue name | Dates | Description | Images |
|---|---|---|---|---|
| Aziory, Grodno | (commons) | 1775–1917 | The building consisted of an almost square main hall. To the west was an arcade with an entrance to the vestibule and a room above, which could have been a prayer room for women. There were lower extensions along the south and north sides, probably also with the women's prayer rooms. At the corners to the west were two lower corner pavilions. These had a two-tier pyramid roof. The main building had a hipped roof and above, slightly offset, a gable roof. The gable was designed in the baroque style. The extensions on the sides had pent roofs. The main hall had two twin windows on each of the three outer sides; the rest of the rooms had smaller, rectangular windows. The ceiling of the main hall had a vault that reached into the roof structure. The bima had the shape of an octagonal, baroque arbor with high wooden columns and was surrounded by a balustrade. The Torah shrine was two-tiered with an attachment that protruded into the vault. It narrowed towards the top and pillars on the sides were decorated with floral motifs. | |
| Byaroza, Brest | (commons) | ????–1941 | | |
| Davyd-Haradok, Brest | (commons) | 1750–1941 | Extensive renovations were carried out in the 19th century; the two-story extensions in the west and north probably date from this time. Due to the roof of the main room, it can be assumed that it was almost square and had a vault inside. | |
| Dubroŭna, Vitebsk | | ???? - 1930 | In 1886 there were 14 synagogues in Dubroŭna. | |
| Hlybokaye, Vitebsk | | 1742–1940s | The construction of the Main Synagogue had a long history. In 1742, Bishop M. Zenkovich of Vilna issued a permit to the local Jewish community to build a synagogue on the site of the one destroyed by fire, again on the condition that the latter did not look like a church (without towers, with a low roof and not high). The synagogue was of a rare wooden-masonry type. | |
| Hrodna, Hrodna | Zaniomanskaja Synagogue (commons) | 1790–1941 | The building was 28.5 meters long, 19 meters wide and 12.5 meters high. There was a separate section for women in the northern and southern part of the ground floor and in the gallery. The walls were richly decorated with biblical verses and prayers. The vault was especially richly decorated. Following the example of Polish landowners' seats, at the façade there were corner alcoves, often used in synagogues in the mid-18th century. Between the two wars, Professor Oskar Sosnowski of the Department of Architecture of the Polytechnic of Warsaw, and photographer and art historian Szymon Zajczyk directed architects to create extensive documentation of the wooden synagogues. They created architectural drawings, replica paintings, and photographs. Much of this project was destroyed during World War II but a substantial amount survived. The synagogue in Hrodna was measured and photographed in 1928. | |
| Ivyanets, Minsk | (commons) | 1912–???? | | |
| Kamyenyets, Brest | | 1750–WWII | The compact building consisted of the main hall with a vestibule in front and the women's prayer room above. It was covered with a two-tiered mansard hipped roof. On the south side, and very likely also on the north side, were four high arched windows. As can be seen in the painting by Napoleon Orda from 1867, on the west side there was a two-story gallery, open at the bottom and closed at the top, and covered by three gabled roofs. The access to the women's rooms was via two external stairs to the right and left of it. At the turn of the century (1900), this porch was very likely replaced by an elongated extension with a pent roof. | |
| Leonpol, Vitebsk | | 1700s–???? | The Leonpol synagogue, erected in the 18th century, was located on the edge of the town. On a slightly sloping relief, the synagogue stood on a foundation of stone boulders. With outward simplicity, it had a rather original structure of a log house. The first tier and the side rooms were arranged as a six-walled log house (four outer walls and two inner transverse walls), and the upper tier rested with transverse walls on the elongated walls of the lower one. The walls were made of beams, in a clean corner, and on the second tier in the walls they had additional reinforcement with the help of foxes (vertical beams reinforced with dowels). Thus, in the architecture of the Leonpol synagogue, two groups of volumes were clearly defined in the simplest version: the main two-tier and the side single-tier ones. The joining of the side ones with gable roofs to the main volume, at the same time, resembles a basilica-spatial solution, which is quite rare in wooden architecture. | |
| Lunna, Grodno | | 1800–1941 | | |
| Mogilev, Mogilev | Cold Synagogue (commons) | 1750–1941 | The synagogue building was a wooden structure built on a stone foundation. The walls of were cut from edged logs into a clean corner. The central log house was dominant in height, to which side log houses were adjoined as covered galleries. A pentagonal structure was added to the main facade, which covered the main entrance. The building was covered with a high gable roof, with a complex plan and numerous outbuildings. In the end of 19th - beginning of 20th century the roof was covered with tin. The interior was almost entirely covered with magnificent polychromes made in 1745 by the Słuck painter Chaim ben Yitzchak ha-Levi Segal. Murals, made on boards, represented the images of 12 signs of the zodiac, mythical animals and cities. Some researchers noted that under the image of mythical cities features of Mogilev from the times of the Polish-Lithuanian Commonwealth were visible. These murals were studied by El Lissitzky and Issachar Ber Ryback. | |
| Maladzyechna, Minsk | | ????–1941 | | |
| Mstsislaw, Mogilev | (commons) | 1775–1941 | The tall building of the main hall was surrounded in the north, west and south by lower extensions, the roofs of which leaned against the side walls and began below the windows. In the west they housed the vestibule and a heated prayer room for the winter, as well as the women's prayer rooms on the other sides. Presumably each side had two pairs of high-mounted twin windows. The high hipped roof had a baroque-style gable on the west with a small window in the middle. | |
| Naroulia, Gomel | (commons) | 1750–1918 | The large, rectangular main hall measured 10.80 x 8.60 m and was surrounded on three sides by lower rooms: to the west by the vestibule and to the south and north by the prayer rooms for women. The entrance to the vestibule and from there to the main hall on the west side was through a portico with a gable supported by columns. To the north and south of this side there were corner pavilions, which had access to the women's prayer rooms on the ground floor and stairs to the rooms on the first floor. The women's rooms each had three rectangular windows; above each wall there were two pairs of windows that let the light into the main hall. The roof had up to four stories, which consisted of concave, convex and straight slopes. These were separated from each other by cornices of different heights. There was a decorative frieze between the first convex roof and the second concave. The corner pavilions had two-story tent roofs, the roofs of the women's rooms leaned against the side walls. The design of the entire building indicated that the main hall, vestibule, women's rooms and corner pavilions were built at the same time. | |
| Nyasvizh, Minsk | | ????–1941 | | |
| Orsha, Vitebsk | | ????–1928 | | |
| Peski, Hrodna | commons | 1775–1941 | The main hall, which was 12.60 × 12.60 m square, was located a few steps lower than the rooms surrounding it on three sides. Up to the beginning of the vault it was 7.60 m and up to its top 13.50 m high. The much lower extensions were the vestibule in the west and the women's prayer rooms in the south and north. There were also two corner pavilions in the west, the walls of which were the same height as the walls of the main hall. The buildings were constructed from horizontal beams and their design shows that all parts of the building were built at the same time. The entrance to the vestibule was through two symmetrically placed doors on the west side, the entrance to the main hall was then through a door in the middle. Small stairs on the sides led to the corner pavilions; from there, there was an entrance to the women's rooms. The upper levels were accessed by stairs in the vestibule. The main hall had two pairs of (high) rectangular windows on each side. Similar but smaller windows were in the women's rooms and on the upper floor of the pavilions. The roof of the main hall consisted of three levels: a lower mansard roof, a hipped roof in the middle and a gable roof above. A round window with a Star of David was built into the gable on the west side during renovations. The corner pavilions had pyramid roofs. The roofs of the women's rooms leaned against the sides to the south and north. The porch had transverse roofs; a kind of monopitch roof on each side and a gable roof in the middle. As a result, the windows on the west side, which were located in between, were not covered by the roof structure of the vestibule. The bima was an octagonal podium surrounded by a balustrade and was located in the center of the room. A few steps led to the Torah shrine on the east side. It was trapezoidal in shape with small pillars at the corners. The sides were decorated with floral motifs and animals. Above was a structure with the tablets of the law held by lions and crowned by a crown. The walls were whitewashed; only the Torah shrine was multi-colored and the wooden bima was natural-colored. | |
| Ros', Grodno | | 1700s–???? | A photograph from the beginning of the 20th century shows that it was also a two-tiered building. Its core consisted of a ritual room close to a square. At the level of the first tier, auxiliary rooms were located under a pitched roof, covering the main volume along the perimeter. In comparison with Leonpol synagogue, this one was approximately twice as large in volume. The length of the walls at the level of the first tier was about twenty meters, and at the level of the second - about twelve. The walls were made of hewn beams, in a clean corner, and had horizontal planking. The windows in the upper tier were high, doubled, with bow-shaped ends, with wide platbands. They sat symmetrically about the vertical axis of the building. The entire building ended with a high roof with a wide baroque pediment, sheathed with herringbone planks, with an arched window with six glass panes. The roof had a tattered covering, which also created a colorful texture and was in contrast to the smoothly sheathed walls. | |
| Skidzyelʹ, Grodno | | 1700s–???? | | |
| Usljany, Minsk | | 1725–1941 | In the 1930s only male bed room, western vestibule and above it female gallery; earlier further extensions on the ground floor. Torah shrine (1761) by the art carver Ber (Minsk State Art Museum). | |
| Vileyka, Minsk | | ????–1941 | | |
| Vishnyeva, Minsk | | ????–1941 | The synagogue was set on fire by the German occupiers in the course of the Holocaust in 1941. Israeli President Shimon Peres recalled this in his speech to the German Bundestag on January 27, 2010, on the Day of Remembrance for the Victims of National Socialism: “When the Nazis marched into Wiszniewo, they ordered all Jews to assemble in the synagogue. My grandfather went in first, wrapped in the same prayer shawl that I wrapped myself in as a child. His family followed him. The doors were bolted from the outside and the wooden building was set on fire. All that remained of the entire community was glowing ashes and smoke." | |
| Wolpa, Hrodna | Wołpa Synagogue (commons) | 1625–1941 | | |
| Zhlobin, Gomel | | ????–1940s | | |

=== Germany ===
| Place and region | Synagogue name | Dates | Description | Images |
|---|---|---|---|---|
| Bechhofen, Mittelfranken | | 1685–1938 destroyed in Kristallnacht | A barrel vault seven meters high and a floor space of around eight by nine meters rose above the wood-paneled prayer room. Adjacent to the main room was the prayer room for the female parishioners, which was separated by a diamond-shaped lattice. There were living rooms above it. In 1732 the synagogue was beautifully painted by the Galician painter Eliezer Sussmann. The paintings were depictions of the Jerusalem Temple and copies of Hebrew legal texts. Numerous valuable cult objects were kept in the synagogue, including a very old Torah scroll from the Jewish community of Herrieden, which was dissolved in 1681, several old Torah pennants and the memorandum of the Jewish community from 1729. During the Nazi era, the first desecration occurred in November 1936 when the synagogue and several Jewish houses were smeared with red paint. Although the synagogue was listed, it was burned down with its precious rituals during the November pogrom on November 9, 1938. The ruin was removed a little later. The synagogue property came into the possession of the municipality of Bechhofen. In the 1980s, a memorial was set up on the property. A memorial stone with an inscription plaque was placed in the middle. | Innenansicht |

=== Latvia ===
| Place and region | Synagogue name | Dates | Description | Images |
|---|---|---|---|---|
| Ludza, Latgale | (commons) | 1804 | Baroque, timber construction clad with bricks in the early 20th century. Dome ceiling, painting. Restored in 2016. | |
| Rēzekne, Latgale | | 1845 | Neoclassical. Restored in 2015. | |

=== Lithuania ===
| Place and region | Synagogue name | Dates | Description | Images |
|---|---|---|---|---|
| Alanta, Utena | Synagogue of Alanta | 1870 between 1870 and 1900 | The synagogue is a wooden log structure of rectangular plan, built on a rough-stone concrete foundation and divided into two floors in the west. The structure is spanned with a hipped rafter roof covered with tin. On the exterior, the building is protected with horizontal weather-boarding above the windowsills of the prayer hall, and a vertical one below them. A prayer hall of almost square plan is situated on the eastern side. On the western side, the building includes a vestibule and a small room with a stove, which also heated the prayer hall. A staircase in the southwestern corner leads to a women's section on the first floor, which opens to the prayer hall with two long rectangular windows. The main entrance to the building is in the western wall and the women's entrance is on the southern wall. Ten round-headed windows opened from the prayer hall: three windows on the southern and northern walls and two pairs of windows on the eastern wall. The windows of the vestibule and the women's section are rectangular. The ceilings are joisted flat constructions; that of the prayer hall is supported by two large beams, resting on the western wall of the women's section and the eastern wall of the prayer hall. | |
| Jurbarkas, Tauragė | (commons) | 1780–1941 | | |
| Kaltinėnai, Lithuania, Tauragė | | 1938 | Architect: Kazys Kralikas. Wooden synagogue with attached rabbi apartment. Used as a prayer house until 1941, after 1945 barn, vacant since 1990. | |
| Kurkliai, Utena | (commons) | 1936 | Traditional synagogue architecture with expressionist elements. The building is not oriented strictly from west to east, but from southwest to northeast. It is 11.85 m long and 7.88 m wide, the outer walls are 6.95 m high. In addition to the traditional synagogue architecture, expressionist elements such as an asymmetrically arranged tower on the southwest corner to highlight the main entrance, high, pointed windows and dormers on the hipped roof were used. There were two stars of David on the tower. The single-story main room was to the southeast; in the northwest there was a two-story construction with three rooms on the ground floor (anteroom to the men's bed room, the staircase to the women's bed room above and a heated room in between). There were separate entrances and smaller square windows. The building had eight large windows: three each on the long sides and two in the southeast, between which the Torah shrine stood. The bima was in the center of the room (slightly offset to the rear). Rows of seats were arranged next to the bima and between the bima and the Torah shrine. When it was converted into a warehouse, the windows were closed with boards, the interior was destroyed and a large gate was added in the southeast. After the Second World War it was used as a warehouse for a long time (after renovations) and has been empty since the 1990s. The synagogue has been restored since 2019. | |
| Laukuva, Tauragė | | 1928 | Was reconstructed after 1945, now vacant. | |
| Pakruojis, Šiauliai | (commons) | 1801 | Together with another wooden synagogue and a Shtibl, also made of wood, it formed the Shulhoyf; the ensemble survived two fires in the 19th century. The German occupiers detained the Jewish population on the site (July 1941), from where they were brought to Morkakalnis and murdered there. The building ensemble still existed in the post-war period, the Shtibl was demolished in 1970, and the second synagogue before 1997. After being vacant until 1954, the building was used as a cinema until 1971, then a gymnasium, shop and was finally empty again. After a fire in 2009, the wooden building was renovated in 2014. The reopening took place in May 2017 in the presence of the Israeli ambassador and other dignitaries. It was an early classicist wooden building with a mansard roof. The vestibule with the winter synagogue lied in the northwest, above it, slightly protruding and supported by two wooden Doric columns, the women's gallery. The barrel vault was painted around 1895. | |
| Plungė, Telšiai | | 1931 | Prayer house of the Chevra kadisha. The original structure is well preserved. Wooden house on an almost square floor plan with a tin-covered, red-painted tent roof. Used as a school building after 1945, has since been returned to the Jewish community. | |
| Rietavas, Telšiai | | 1700s–???? | In Soviet times timber from the synagogue was used for construction of a storehouse. | |
| Rozalimas, Šiauliai | (commons) | 1881 | The elongated wooden building stands on a stone base. The dimensions are 16.19 × 11.62 m with a height of 7.78 m. The prayer room in the southeast was almost square with 11.20 × 10.50 m. In front of it were further rooms in the north-west, above which the women's prayer room was located. Originally the rooms for the women and the main room had a common ceiling. After the Second World War and the murder of the Jewish population in the Holocaust, the building was used as a warehouse and a second ceiling was put in the main room. In the south-west, an asbestos-covered annex was added; entrances have also been changed. Part of the wooden beams on this side were also replaced by silicate bricks. The building was covered with a crooked roof. | |
| Seda, Telšiai | | 1825 | | |
| Telšiai, Telšiai | | 1873 | | |
| Tirkšliai, Telšiai | | 1825 | | |
| Trakai, Vilnius | | 1790 | | |
| Valkininkai, Alytus | | 1775–1941 | The main hall (the men's prayer room) was entered through a vestibule to the west. To the left and right of it were two low corner pavilions. The (also lower) prayer room for women was built along the north side; This part was wider than the corner pavilion in front of it and therefore protruded laterally over its entire length. This asymmetry of the overall structure was probably due to the terrain (sloping terrain). The walls were made of horizontal beams on a stone base. The entrance to the vestibule was through two symmetrically attached doors with a triangular point on the west side and from there through a central door to the main hall. To the right and left was another door to the corner pavilions. The door to the women's area was rectangular and to the side of the corner pavilion on the wall extending beyond it. The building had two high-lying rectangular windows in pairs on each side. The women's rooms and the corner pavilions had smaller square windows. Between the outer doors to the vestibule was a small round window and in the roof there was an attic window to the west and east. The roof was three-tiered; the lower two steps were mansard roofs closed off by a gable roof. The main hall was five steps lower than the surrounding rooms. It was almost square with 11.60 × 10.50 m. The wall height was 7.30 m and up to the top of the vaulted dome 11.50 m. Four rectangular wooden pillars supported the roof vault and divided the room into nine almost equally sized fields. Between these columns, shifted to the west towards the entrance, stood the Bima. The bima itself was octagonal and had the shape of a small arbor or chapel with an upwardly open canopy that protruded into the vaulted dome. At the top stood the figure of an eagle with wings spread and its head cocked up. The Torah shrine in the Rococo style protruded clearly from the east wall. It consisted of several levels, with the structure protruding into the vault. Above the lower part, which housed the Torah scrolls, the tablets of the law were placed on the second level. These were framed by carvings (including birds and lions). The whole thing was completed at the top by the figure of a double-headed eagle. Both the Bima and the Torah shrine were of high artistic value and handcrafted production; however, their style differed, so that it must be assumed that they were made by different artists and craftsmen. | |
| Veisiejai, Alytus | | 1925 | | |
| Vilkaviškis, Marijampolė | (commons) | 1545–1940s | At the beginning of the 16th century Queen Bona (wife of King Zigmunt August the Second) donated timber to the citizens of Vilkovishk for building prayer houses. Jews were among the beneficiaries and built the Great synagogue in 1545, which existed till World War II. It was renovated several times over the years. The synagogue contained an oak Aron Kodesh, that was three stories high (11 meters), decorated with engraved wooden ornaments, which housed several scrolls brought by those expelled from Spain as well as the usual Scrolls of the Torah. | |
| Žiežmariai, Kaunas | | 1875 | The building was 22.57 × 17.19 m and has a maximum height of 9.63 m. The main hall (the men's prayer room) faces southeast and measures 13.85 × 15.00 m. There was one in the northwest spacious vestibule flanked by two adjoining rooms. In the western corner there was an extension with a staircase to the women's rooms. The synagogue was covered by a hipped roof. The main entrance was in the middle of the northwest wall; another door in the northeast leads directly into the main room. This has 18 arched windows. The interior was plastered with painting, of which only remnants can be seen. The bima stood in the middle of the room and was surrounded by four pillars, two of which supported the ceiling until the renovation. The structure thus resembles the nine-field stone synagogues. The Torah shrine was on the east wall. Above it was a painted plaster relief with a palm tree in a triangular vase, which can still be seen. The few remaining shapes and colors of the interior design suggest a neoclassical aesthetic, while the palm motif may be inspired by Lithuanian folk motifs. | |

=== Poland ===
| Place and region | Synagogue name | Dates | Description | Images |
|---|---|---|---|---|
| Cieszowa, Silesian | | 1741–1911 | Simple wooden synagogue in the style of a farmhouse. The synagogue in Cieszowa was built before 1751 by the builder of the existing church. In 1911 (four years after priest Karol Urban purchased it for 1,200 thalers), the synagogue was pulled down. | |
| Dobrzyń nad Wisłą, Kuyavian-Pomeranian | | ????–1940s | | |
| Gąbin, Masovian | (commons) | 1710–1939 | | |
| Janów Sokólski, Podlaskie Voivodeship | | mid-1700s–1941 | | |
| Jedwabne, Podlaskie | Jedwabne Synagogue (commons) | 1770–1913 | The layered, pitched roof visible in surviving exterior photographs conceals a series of massive trusses from which the great dome was suspended. The roof, which features three well-defined stages, was considered one of the most architecturally complex and interesting of wooden synagogue roofs. The synagogue was enlarged in the nineteenth century by the addition of one story extensions on each side for the use of the women of the community. | |
| Końskie, Świętokrzyskie | (commons) | 1780–1939 | The main hall was on the west side and a two-story gallery at its corners in the south and north. This was originally open, during the renovations in 1905 it was closed with a wooden panel. Access to the upper floor was via two symmetrical stairs on the sides. Between the gallery and the main hall there was still the vestibule and a smaller room and another room as a (small) prayer room for women. The large women's prayer room was located above this. The main hall (the men's prayer room) had two twin windows with round arches on the outer walls. The two-tiered mansard hipped roof was divided by a small step and was closed at the bottom by a frieze. The extensions of the gallery at the corners had their own little gable roofs. The men's prayer room was almost square with 11.90 × 12.10 m; the wall height was 7.60 m and the height to the top of the dome was 13.80 m. An octagonal dome had been built into the roof in two steps; at the bottom it was divided into eight trapezoidal elements and at the top into triangles. The bima under the dome had an arbor shape (also octagonal). An older Torah shrine was replaced by a new one (probably in the 19th century). This was in the shape of a narrow cupboard with double doors and small pillars. Above it was a double-headed eagle with a crown, which probably came from the original Torah shrine. | |
| Kórnik, Greater Poland | | 1767–1940 | Of the well-known Polish wooden synagogues, this was the furthest to the west. Its architectural style differs from the other synagogues there and its style was reminiscent of Protestant churches. It is therefore possible that the architect acquired his knowledge in what was then Germany. The dimensions were 18.20 m from west to east and 13.13 m from south to north; the wall height was 5.20 m and inside up to the dome 10.00 m. Access to the vestibule was through a porch framed by pairs of columns with a gable roof that reached to the beginning of the roof of the main building. The two-tier roof consisted of a mansard roof and a hipped roof above. There were four high arched windows on the side walls in the south and north and two each in the west and east. In the south and west there were small rectangular windows underneath. In the mansard part of the roof there were also small round windows with a gable built into it. From the porch three steps led up to the vestibule and from there two more steps down to the main room, the men's prayer room. The gallery for the women was located above the vestibule and along the south wall; this was supported by pillars and protruded into the hall. Access to the gallery was via a staircase in the southwest corner, which was reached there through a door from the outside. In the south-east there was another staircase for an emergency exit. The entire interior had an octagonal dome under which (slightly to the north) stood the Bima. This was framed by an octagonal wooden balustrade. The Torah shrine was not in the middle of the east wall. Because of the women's gallery protruding into the hall, it was offset to the north in the middle between the north wall and the end of the gallery. It was multi-colored, consisted of several levels and was decorated, among other things, with motifs of double-headed eagles, birds of prey and lions. In the middle were the tablets of the law. The Eternal Light (Ner Tamid) was not placed near the Torah shrine, as usual, but was in the northwest corner in the niche of an annex reminiscent of a stove in living rooms. Except for the east wall and the dome, the walls were whitewashed. Plaques with texts were placed under and between the windows. | |
| Lutomiersk, Łódź | | 1765–1914 | The synagogue consisted of the men's prayer room and a vestibule in the west with another room. Above was the gallery for the women. This protruded a little over the wall into the hall. In front of the entrance was a portico with two symmetrically arranged stairs to a small veranda and the entrance of the women. The main hall had three large square windows on the south and north sides (and probably two in the east). The vestibule and women's room had one downstairs and two upstairs two smaller windows. In the southwest was an additional entrance to the vestibule. The roof was two-tiered; Above a frieze was a mansard gable roof and above it a short hipped roof that merged into a gable roof. The gables were divided by pilasters; the lower one had two semicircular windows arranged symmetrically and an oculus in the middle above. The main room was 15.27 × 15.60 m. It was divided into three longitudinal rooms by two rows of four wooden columns each, similar to church naves; in the middle with a width of 10.00 m and each side with a width of 2.80 m. The octagonal bima stood in the middle of the room; above her a dome arched under the roof. The Torah shrine on the east wall was a cupboard placed between two pillars. Above it were two eagles, one on top of the other, with a crown in between. These were gilded; the walls were painted a light blue paint. Significantly influenced by Central European church architecture. | |
| Nasielsk, Masovian | Nasielsk Synagogue | 1700–1880 | The main hall of the synagogue was square. There were wings on each side that served as women's prayer areas. A women's prayer balcony was added above the vestibule in 1857. The synagogue had a two-tiered roof with dormer windows. The ceiling thought to have been vaulted. The exterior featured a second story balcony and a pair of corner pavilions that contained stairs to the women's gallery. The exterior featured unusually elaborate railings, pillars and cornice trim. Building was demolished due to dilapidation. | |
| Nowe Miasto nad Pilicą, Masovian | | 1785–1941 | | |
| Pilica, Silesian | | 1747–1941 | Interior painting from 1816. | |
| Połaniec, Świętokrzyskie | (commons) | 1744–1943 | The rectangular synagogue had a hipped roof with a smaller gable on the west. The roof protruded well beyond the building and was supported on all four sides by wooden pillars. In the west there was a vestibule and another room at ground level. This was followed by the main hall, the men's prayer room. Above the vestibule and the adjoining room was the women's prayer room, which was accessible via an outer staircase. In the middle third of the stem was another small stem. The main hall had rectangular windows, the other rooms had smaller, square windows. The bima in the form of an octagonal arbor stood almost in the middle of the main room and was surrounded by a balustrade. The Torah shrine on the east wall was framed by a pair of columns and had a top with a crown. After 2014, a replica was built in the open-air museum for folk architecture in Sanok 150 km away. | |
| Przedbórz, Łódź | | 1760–1939 | On the south side of the men's room, the women's room was built on. Originally arcades across the entire width of the building. | |
| Puńsk, Podlaskie | | 1900–late 19th / early 20th century | After 1945 it was converted into a residential building. | |
| Śniadowo, Podlaskie | (commons) | 1768–1914; Burned down by Russian soldiers during World War I. | It consisted of a square (12 × 12 m) large main hall. The walls were 6 m high; it was 10.20 m to the highest point of the vault, and the floor was a few steps lower than the outer rooms. On the west side there was a vestibule and above it a gallery with arcades. A two-story corner pavilion stood to the right and left. The north and south sides were flanked by women's dreams. The main building had a three- story tent roof, with the upper step transitioning to an octagonal point. The corner pavilions had a two-story roof. Inside, four wooden pillars supported the vault; they divided the floor plan into nine equally sized fields. In the middle stood the bima; it was in the shape of an octagonal arbor with a canopy with a crown on the top. | |
| Suchowola, Podlaskie | (commons) | 1747–1941 | The imposing building consisted of the men's prayer room, the main room, and a vestibule in front of it in the west and two small rooms to the right and left of this. The women's prayer rooms were along the entire north and south walls. The high roof was divided into three levels, a lower part, a mansard hipped roof and a gable roof above. The parts were separated from each other by small walls. The lower women's rooms and the vestibule each had a pent roof that leans against the walls. At the corners to the west, two gable roofs still gave the impression of corner pavilions. The main hall had two pairs of windows (with round arches) on each wall above the pent roof. The women's rooms and the vestibule had smaller, rectangular windows. The entrance to the vestibule was through two symmetrically arranged, pointed gable doors and from there laterally into the side rooms and centrally into the prayer room. The access to the women's rooms was from the outside on the long sides. The prayer room measured 15.00 x 10.80 m, was 6.50 m high on the walls and 11.60 m high up to the top of the vault. It was a few steps lower than the outer rooms. The vault was supported by four wooden pillars, in the middle of which stood the bima and which divided the room into nine almost equally sized fields. Inside was a small balcony along the west wall; this was probably the only part that was added later. The richly decorated Torah shrine on the east wall resembled a baroque altar and extended to the beginning of the vault. It was framed by pillars. In the upper part were the tablets of the law and above them an eagle with spread wings. | |
| Wiśniowa, Lesser Poland | | 1910 frühes 20. Jh.–???? | | |
| Wysokie Mazowieckie, Podlaskie | (commons) | ????–1880 | The wooden synagogue was demolished in the 1870s due to its disrepair. It was replaced by the New Synagogue. The wooden and oriented synagogue building was erected on a square plan. The main hall, intended for men, was illuminated by high, double windows with semicircular endings. The entrance to it was on the west side. The women's halls were located on the ground floor, in "outbuildings"on both sides of the synagogue, covered with seven separate hip and hip roofs. They also had a separate entrance from the south. Wooden logs were joined without nails. The synagogue was crowned with a high, three-story shingled roof. | |
| Zabłudów, Podlaskie | Zabłudów Synagogue (commons) | 1635/46–1941 | When the synagogue was built, Zabłudów belonged to the Radziwiłł family. Krzysztof Radziwiłł gave permission to build it in 1635. This was then probably built around 1640 by his son Janusz Radziwiłł. In the years up to its destruction in World War II, it was constantly expanded and rebuilt; the last time between 1895 and 1923. The main hall, built from horizontal beams, was almost square with 11.30 × 11.70 m. The height of the walls was 6.50 m; it was 9.75 m to the highest point of the barrel vault. Originally it had two windows in each wall, some of which were later closed by the renovations. As early as 1646 it was decided to add a room on the ground floor for the women. There were two small, slightly different pavilions on the corners. In 1765 there were further major modifications. At the beginning of the 19th century, the vestibule was expanded and another women's room was built above it. The roof shapes were also changed during renovation work. The elevated Torah shrine was two-tiered and had different artistic and material qualities. The bimah was near the entrance and was shaped like an octagonal little chapel. | |

=== Russia ===
| Place and region | Synagogue name | Dates | Description | Images |
|---|---|---|---|---|
| Kostroma, Kostroma | | 1907 | Used as a synagogue from 1907 to 1930 and since 2001 after restoration | |
| Tomsk, Tomsk | | 1872, 1906 | It appeared in 1872 as a prayer school for soldiers, and in 1906, after a fire, it turned directly into a Soldiers' synagogue. After the fire, the building was rebuilt, with decorations in the form of three domes on the roof and carvings around the door portal and on the window frames in the form of a Torah scroll, a star of David, and grapes. In 1930, the synagogue was closed — the building was taken away from the Jewish community and converted into a dormitory for employees of Tomsk State University. In 2018, the synagogue building was transferred to the Jewish community of Tomsk. | |

=== Ukraine ===
| Place and region | Synagogue name | Dates | Description | Images |
|---|---|---|---|---|
| Berezdivtsi, Lviv | (commons) | 1790–1941 | The synagogue consisted of a 8.20 × 7.50 m main room, the prayer room for the men. The walls were 5 meters high; the inner height up to the top of the vault was 6.50 m. In front of the room was a vestibule and next to it another room for the kehillah. Above was the women's prayer room, which only allowed a view into the main room through narrow slits. Access to the women's room was via a staircase along the south wall. This led to a covered balcony that was supported by columns. The roof was an extension of the main roof. The roof itself was two-tiered, the lower part was a hipped roof and above it a gable roof. The three outer sides of the men's prayer room each had two pairs of windows. The bima was not in the middle of the room, but was offset towards the entrance. It had a canopy and was richly decorated. The Torah shrine stood on a console and was two-tiered with side wings. The essay protruded into the vault. The exact shape of the vault is doubtful, it has been described as both an octagonal dome and a barrel vault. The bima and the Torah shrine, like the building, were most likely from the end of the 18th century, as were the colored wall paintings. These had faded at the beginning of the 20th century. Only in the vault were there figures, probably the signs of the zodiac. In these, the faces of the human figures were painted over. In the 19th century, another room for women was added along the north wall at ground level, along the length of the main room. The vestibule was also given a small porch through which the building could be entered. The women's room had a pent roof, this partially covered the windows to the main room, just like the gable roof of the porch covered the windows of the women's room above the vestibule. | |
| Bila Tserkva (Bila Cirkev), Zakarpattia | | ????–1944 | | |
| Khodoriv (Chodorow, Hodorov), Lviv | (commons) | 1642–1941 | The earliest date given for the construction of the main hall of the synagogue is 1642. The spaces surrounding them have been added over the years. There were also extensive renovations that changed the external appearance, for example the exterior of the building was redesigned due to an unskillful renovation in 1909/10. During the First World War it was damaged by a fire started by Russian soldiers; however, the damage has been repaired. The main hall was almost square with 12.00 × 12.75 m. The height of the walls was 7.30 m; it was 10.50 m to the top of the vault and the roof had receded gradually until the renovation. The octagonal bimah stood near the entrance; During the restorations between 1909 and 1910, the presumably wooden construction was replaced by a cast one. The Torah shrine was probably built later than the main hall. It consisted of two different parts that weren't the same age: the shrine itself and a flat frame with sculptures attached to the wall. Shortly after its construction, the building was richly decorated with multicolored paintings by Israel, son of Mordechai Liśnicki from Jaryczów. Further restorations of the interior decoration took place in 1895 and 1905. | |
| Chornobyl, Kyiv | (commons) | ????–1941 | | |
| Dolyna (Janiv), Ternopil | (commons) | 1700–1941 | The main building of the wooden synagogue was built around 1700. Probably between 1750 and 1800, a stone porch with a small prayer room and another prayer room for women on the first floor was added to the west side. In 1928 it was classified as extremely dilapidated and therefore renovated in 1934. The wooden building stood on a stone base. The square main hall was 10.20 x 10.20 m in size. The walls were 6.60 m high; the highest point of the vault was 10.60 m. On each side there were 2 window groups with 2 windows each, whereby the windows on the west side were covered by the annex. The windows and also the doors had round arches. The stone extension was added regardless of the plan of the main building; so the wooden ceiling of the prayer room for women was halfway up the window. The 6.50 m high Torah shrine was from 1795 and had a bronze eagle figure on its top. The pillars were multicolored. The bima stood in the middle between the entrance and the stairs to the Torah shrine. | |
| Horokhiv, Volyn | | ????–1941 | | |
| Horodok, Khmelnytskyi | | ????–1940s | | |
| Horodnia, Chernihiv | | 1900–???? | | |
| Hvizdets (Gwoździec), Ivano-Frankivsk | Gwoździec Synagogue (commons) | 1640/52–1941 | According to inscriptions on the ceiling, the polychromy, dated around 1652, was the work of Israel ben Mordechai from Yarychiv (Jaryczów). Between 1700 and 1731, an octagonal cupola was added to the barrel vault. The polychromy was renewed in 1729 by Isaac ben Yehuda Leib Cohen of Jaryczów and Mordechai Liśnicki of Jaryczów. Additions over time include a vestibule, women's sections, and a brick wing that served as a small synagogue, which could be heated in winter, and as a Cheder. The synagogue was destroyed by fire during World War I, when the Russian front moved through the town. The reconstructed timber-frame roof and painted ceiling were installed in the core exhibition of POLIN Museum of the History of Polish Jews, in Warsaw, in 2013. | |
| Yabluniv (Jabłonów), Ivano-Frankivsk | (commons) | 1674–1914 burned down by the Russian army on November 6, 1914 | Construction began around 1650; the oldest secured date results from the inscription 1674 above the Torah shrine. The rich murals were done in stages from that date to 1727. Among other things, at the end of the 19th century and 1910, external extensions were both built and others demolished. The elongated building was covered with a two-tier hipped roof, the upper part of which merged into a gable roof towards the top. There were extensions (at different times) on the north wall. In the west there was a porch that was initially open. Its lower part was later closed with boards so that only the veranda above remained open. The entrance to the west led through the vestibule with two rooms on both sides into the main hall, which was a few steps lower. The women's prayer rooms were located above the vestibule. The walls were richly decorated with multicolored murals. The bima was near the entrance to the vestibule and therefore not in the middle of the room. It was in the shape of an octagonal arbor. The Torah shrine on the east wall stood on a pedestal. It was richly decorated and consisted of two levels, in the upper level were the tablets of the law. | |
| Yaryshiv (Jaryshiv), Vinnytsia | (commons) | 1725–1941 | The main hall was almost square with a vestibule, on the upper floor of which there were prayer rooms for the women. The wooden structure stood on a brickwork. On the south side there was another, brick-built extension, which also housed women's rooms. On the west side was a two-story gallery that protruded laterally over the main hall. The roof consisted of two lower hipped roof steps and a gable roof on the third level. Inside, the ceiling was expanded into an octagonal dome. The walls and the ceiling were painted multicolored with animal-shaped mythical creatures and psalms. The bima was also an octagonal podium with a balustrade. The Torah shrine was richly decorated with carvings. | |
| Kamianka-Buzka, Lviv | (commons) | 1730–1941 | The main hall, built from horizontal beams, was almost square at 13.00 × 12.00 m. The height of the walls was 7.50 m; it was 9.50 m to the top of the vault and had a two-tiered roof. In its construction it was a gable roof, which, however, showed itself as a mansard roof with front gables through two rows of extensions. A vestibule was later added to the west side and the prayer room for women on the first floor. Further women's rooms were on the north and south sides. The main hall and the women's prayer room each had their own vault. The octagonal bima in the middle of the hall, richly decorated with wood carvings, was in the shape of a small arbor-like chapel. The Torah shrine was a cupboard adorned with floral motifs and standing on a desk. | |
| Khyriv, Lviv | | 1720–1941 | Male prayer room with barrel vault and cove on the fighter. The women's rooms on two floors above the western anteroom. Gable roof in east–west direction. | |
| Korytnyzja (Korytnica), Volyn | | ????–1941 | | |
| Kytaihorod, Khmelnytskyi | commons | ????–1940s | | |
| Lutsk, Volyn | (commons) | 1814–1972 | The rectangular wooden building consisted of the high, almost square prayer room for the men and, in front of it, the vestibule, above which the prayer room for the women was located. This had narrow openings to the main hall, as well as a gallery for a choir. A staircase led from the vestibule to the women's rooms and (through this) to the gallery. A narrow extension to the west was the same height as the whole building and led to the vestibule. The men's prayer room had two rectangular windows on three sides to the north, east and south; the two floors of the vestibule and women's room had two smaller windows on each side. The roof was two-tiered with a mansard roof and above it a hipped roof that merged into a gable roof. The narrow extension to the west had a gable roof. During the alterations and renovations after the First World War, the rectangular windows were replaced by arched windows and the extension in the west was demolished and a portico with a gable roof was built in its place. The walls were (mainly) decorated with floral ornaments. The bima was a simple table covered with a tablecloth. There were fixed rows of seats for the assembled. The Torah shrine consisted of four levels that tapered towards the top and were framed by columns. The Torah scrolls themselves were on the second level behind a carved folding door. Above were the tablets of the law. Among them was a saying from the Talmud. This was very unusual as the Karaites only refer to the Torah and reject the Talmud. The Torah shrine was probably made by a member of Rabbinic Judaism, as their own community was too small to find a skilled craftsman. | |
| Lanckorun (Zarichanka), Khmelnytskyi | | ????–1940s | | |
| Mikhalpol (Mykhailivka), Khmelnytskyi | | 1750–1941 | Main building on an almost square floor plan with extensions to the west and the north (story). | |
| Mynkivtsi, Khmelnytskyi | (commons) | 1787–1941 | The main hall was square. The walls consisted of horizontal wooden beams, which were covered with boards on the outside. The roof was two stories. Inside the hall were multi-colored paintings. In the course of time, disorderly additions were built around the main hall, some of them made of large stones and some of wood. | |
| Norynsk, Zhytomyr | (commons) | 1800–???? | The main hall (the men's prayer room) was almost square. Originally there was a room for women along the north wall. This was torn down and the women's room relocated to the west via the vestibule. The entire building was covered by a hipped roof, which merged into a gable roof in the upper half. The eaves were different between the main hall and the vestibule / women's room. This suggests that these two parts were built at different times and then got a common roof. Inside, the men's prayer room had an octagonal, multicolored painted dome. The bima was also octagonal; unlike many others in similar synagogues, however, it did not have a canopy. | |
| Olyka, Volyn | (commons) | 1879–1942 | The vestibule was in front of the almost square main hall in the west. Above this there was a gallery for the choir (which protruded somewhat into the main hall), and behind it (separated by a wall) the women's rooms. In front of it was a two-story gallery with the same height. Stairs to the right and left of the gallery led to the first floor and from there to the women's rooms. There were single-storey extensions along the side walls. The gallery was divided into seven fields on the lower level and four on the upper level by supporting beams. The main hall had two pairs of windows in the south (and probably also in the north and east). Inside, the ceiling was supported by four wooden pillars that divided it into nine fields. A two-tier hipped roof covered the entire building (main hall, vestibule, gallery). The roofs of the extensions in the south and north leaned against the walls of the synagogue building. The bima was an octagonal podium with an open-topped dome that was surrounded by a balustrade. She stood between the pillars that supported the ceiling. The Torah shrine was in the form of a cupboard protruding from the wall with columns and floral motifs on the side walls. Above were the tablets of the law. Blessing hands and birds of prey closed it at the top. | |
| Orynyn, Khmelnytskyi | | ????–1941 | | |
| Ostropol, Khmelnytskyi | | ????–1940s | | |
| Ovruch, Zhytomyr | | ????–1941 | | |
| Pavlivka, Volyn | (commons) | 1750–1941 | The building had unusual proportions compared to other wooden synagogues in the region. Compared to the square footprint of the main hall, it was unusually high and its area was also less than the total area of the surrounding rooms. In the entrance area was the vestibule, which was preceded by an arcade supported by wooden columns. Above was the women's prayer room. Along the side walls in the south and north were two full-length extensions that contained additional rooms. The windows of the main hall were placed very high; Two twin windows each above the extensions and two simple ones on the east wall. Like the (smaller) windows above the vestibule, they were closed off by segments of a circle. The windows of the extensions on the sides were rectangular. The main building had a hipped roof that merged into a small gable roof. The other parts had monopitch roofs. It is unknown whether the vestibule and side extensions were built at the same time or later. The symmetrical plan speaks for the same time, while the different wall constructions speak for a later time. | |
| Pechenizhyn, Ivano-Frankivsk | (commons) | 1795–1941 | The main hall was almost square with 8.60 × 8.5 m; the walls had a height of 4.30 m. In the west there was a vestibule, which was used as a prayer room in the basement in winter and the women's rooms were on the first floor. In 1903 a side wing was added to the south for additional prayer rooms for women. There were two rectangular windows on each side wall; on the south side they were later covered by the extension. The entire original structure had a two-tier hipped roof with hammer-beam vaults. The gable of the rafter roof of the extension from 1903 stood at right angles to the roof of the main hall. The main hall presumably had a vaulted ceiling at first, but this was later removed so that one could see up to the roof. The main room was decorated with multi-colored paintings. The high Torah shrine was three-tiered and richly decorated. It was separated from the rest of the room by a small door. The bima stood on an octagonal podium near the entrance and had a balustrade with two rows of round balusters standing on top of one another. | |
| Pohrebyshche, Vinnytsia | Pohrebyshche Synagogue (commons) | 1690–1941 | Even older synagogue destroyed in Cossack uprisings. The main hall had three aisles and was almost square (12.00 × 12.40 m). It consisted of the central part and two side parts that were narrower (1.80 m) and lower. Around the main hall there were extensions on three sides: in the west the vestibule with a second floor for the prayer room for women and two further single-storey halls on the sides, these were also prayer rooms for women. On the western side there was a two-story corner pavilion on both sides. The side aisles and women's rooms were under one roof, while the central nave was under a separate two-part mansard roof. The vestibule with the women's gallery above had its own roof, the corner pavilions had steep gable roofs. The walls consisted of horizontal beams, which were reinforced by struts in the main hall. The walls were painted in multiple colors and showed birds, plants and domesticated animals. The main hall was covered by a two-tier roof. The Torah shrine was 4.50 m high and consisted of three parts. It was decorated with carvings and inscriptions. The bima stood on an octagonal podium and was surrounded by a balustrade. | |
| Poliske (Khabne), Kyiv | | ????–1941 | | |
| Polonne, Khmelnytskyi | | ????–1940s | | |
| Polonne, Khmelnytskyi | | ????–1940s | | |
| Rozdil, Lviv | (commons) | 1730–1941 | The main hall was almost square. The entrance was from the south through the vestibule, next to which there was another room. Above that was the area for the women. In later years there were extensions, so there was another women's area along the north side and a two-story corner pavilion in the north-west. There were two windows on each of the outer walls, while those on the north wall were partially covered by the extension. The high roof was two-tiered; below was a hipped roof, and above that, separated by a small wall, another hipped roof that merged into a gable roof. | |
| Skelivka, Lviv | (commons) | 1800–1941 | The main hall was 10.80 × 8.60 m tall and had to key of vault m a height of 10.00. You were in the West, the vestibule and a side room in front. Above was the women's prayer room; this was accessible via a staircase along the west wall. The entrance to the main hall for the men was from the south through the adjoining room and vestibule to the prayer room. There were two windows on each of the outer walls of the hall; The adjoining room and the women's gallery each had a smaller, simple window. The roof was a hipped roof that merged into a smaller gable roof at the top. Inside the prayer room had a monastery vault. The walls were painted in color, but the paintings were barely recognizable at the beginning of the 20th century. The Torah shrine stood on a high platform and was decorated with wooden decorations. The octagonal bima stood in the middle of the room. | |
| Skhidnytsia, Lviv | | 1900 | Probably the only wooden synagogue that still exists in Ukraine today. Now it is a Baptist house of prayer. | |
| Smotrych, Khmelnytskyi | (commons) | 1745–1941 | Almost square main room with combined roof; galleries attached to the west and north. | |
| Talne, Cherkasy | | ????–1941 | | |
| Targowica (Mlyniv), Rivne | (commons) | 1820–1941 | The building consisted of a square main hall, in front of which there was a vestibule and above it the prayer room for the women. In front of these was a narrow, also two-story gallery with a staircase to the women's rooms. The walls consisted of horizontal wooden beams in two levels, which were divided by a cornice. The lower floor was divided into three by wooden pilasters on the sides; upstairs were the windows. For the main hall there were two pairs of windows with round arches; in the women's area a large square and a smaller rectangular window. The synagogue roof was a two-tier hipped roof; the gallery in front had a transverse gable roof, but only at the level of the lower step of the main roof. The vestibule and gallery were built at the same time as the main hall. Inside, the vault of the main hall was supported by four wooden pillars, making nine fields. The eight outer fields had a flat ceiling, while the middle field consisted of a twelve-sided dome that protruded into the roof structure. The walls and the ceiling were painted. The dome, in particular, was richly decorated and structured by three ribbons: floral motifs at the bottom, the signs of the zodiac in the middle, and above vases and baskets between flowers and birds. The final vault was blue and painted with stars. With the signs of the zodiac it was noticeable that the twins were depicted without heads. Presumably, they wanted to circumvent the prohibition of the Second Commandment by interpreting it in such a way that only complete people were not allowed to be drawn. | |
| Velyki Komyaty, Berehove Raion, Zakarpattia Oblast | | Early 20th century | Only preserved wooden synagogue in Ukraine. Relocation to an open-air museum in Uzhhorod is planned for 2025, where the synagogue will serve as a cultural space for the Jewish community. | |
| Zhydachiv, Lviv | (commons) | 1742–1941 | The rectangular building consisted of the square (9 × 9 m) large, one-story main hall (the prayer room for men) and the vestibule to the west, above which the prayer rooms for women were. The main hall had two large, almost square, windows on each of the three outer sides. The vestibule and women's gallery had smaller, rectangular windows. On the west side a staircase in a small porch led to the gallery and a door to the vestibule. A second door was in the southwest corner. During the renovation after 1910, a second (symmetrical) extension was added. The roof was two-tiered with a hipped roof in the lower area and a gable roof set off from it. The porch had its own small roof. During the renovations after 1910, the main roof was replaced by a simpler, stepless hipped roof made of sheet metal and the new (larger) extension was given a pent roof that leaned against the wall. The square male bed room in block construction was closed off by a dome that transformed from a square into an octagon. The wall height was 5.50 m and the height to the top of the dome was 9.50 m. The walls and the dome had a rich, multi-colored painting. The octagonal bima in the middle of the room was surrounded by a wooden parapet. The elaborately carved and painted Torah shrine reached into the dome and curved into it. | |

== In the modern synagogue building ==
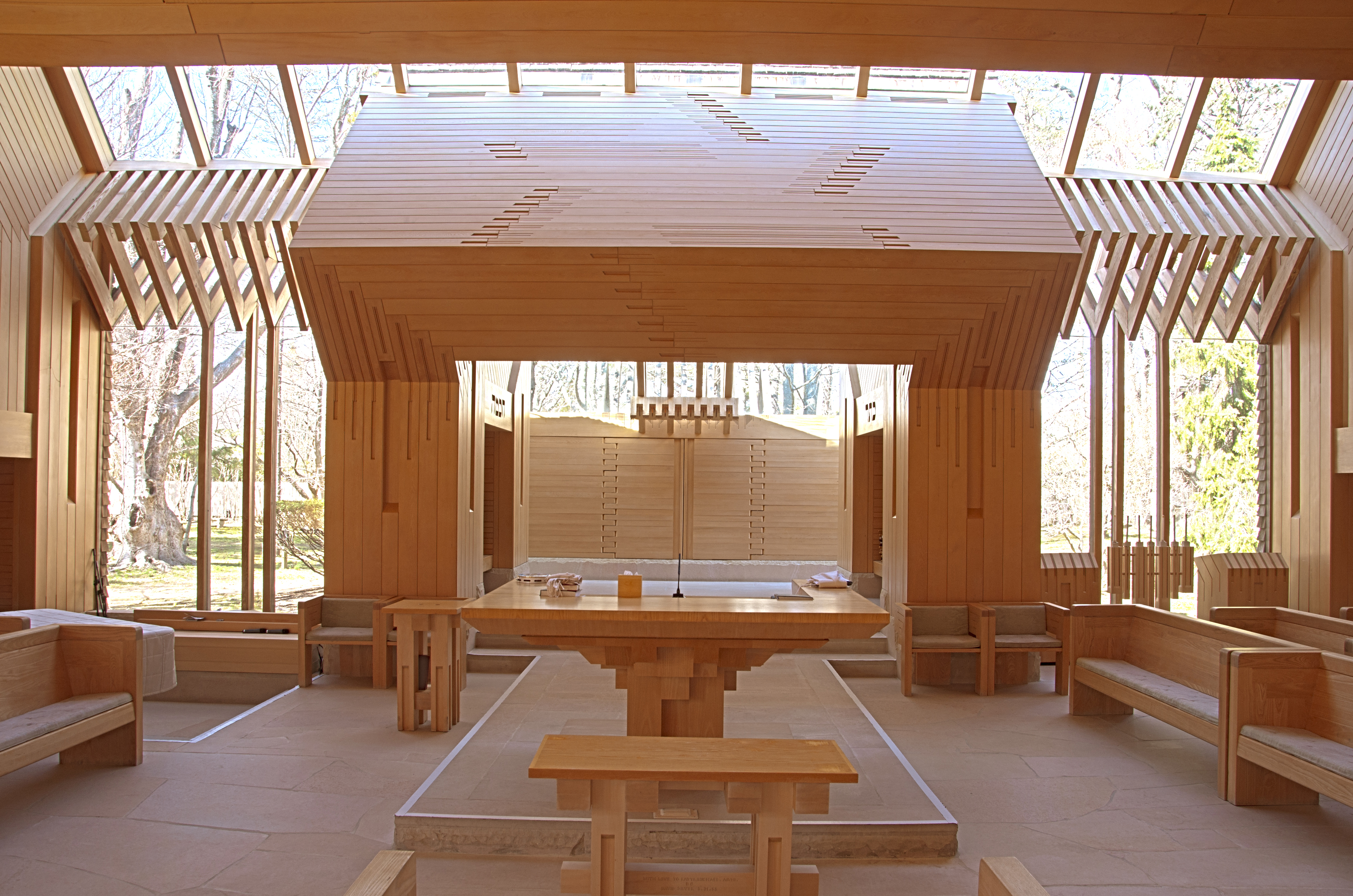
Jewish Center of the Hamptons

Since the publication of the book Wooden Synagogues by Maria and Kazimierz Piechotka (1959), some American architects have referred to the formal language of Polish wooden synagogues:

- Brith Kodesh, Rochester (Pietro Belluschi) 1963
- Sons of Israel Synagogue, Lakewood (David Brody and Wisniewski) 1963
- Adath Yeshurun, Syracuse (Percival Goodman) 1970
- The Jewish Center of the Hamptons (Norman Jaffe) 1989
- The Orthodox Hampton Synagogue (Eddie Jacobs)
- Beth El, Chappaqua (Lous Kahn) 1972

== Replicas ==
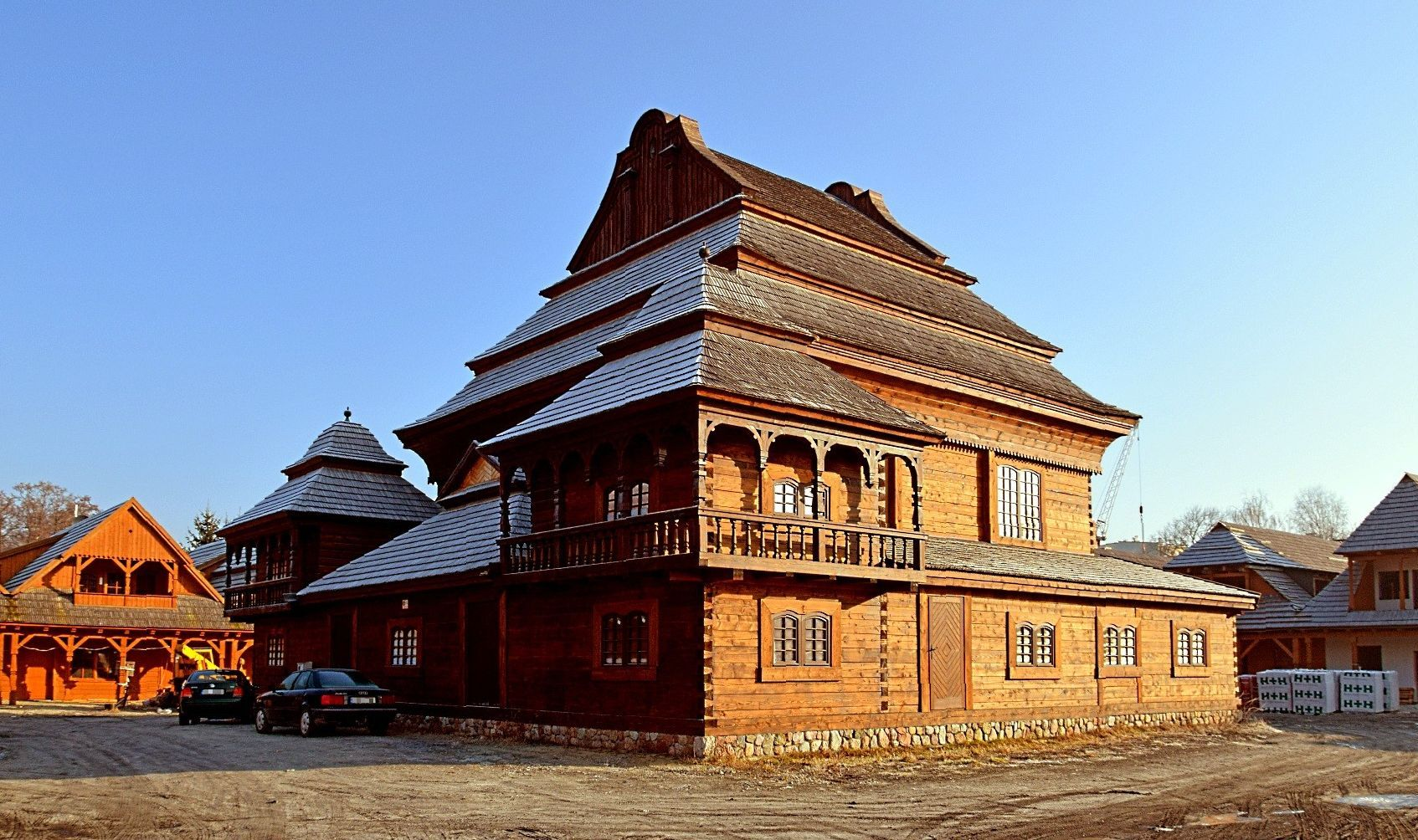
Replica of the Wołpa synagogue

There is a replica of the Wołpa Synagogue is in Bilgoraj, and another replica of the synagogue (Połaniec) is in Sanok.

POLIN Museum of the History of Polish Jews in Warsaw has a partial reconstruction of the Gwoździec Synagogue. The ceiling painting of the synagogue in Chodoriw was reconstructed for the ANU - Museum of the Jewish People (Beit Hatefusot) in Tel Aviv.

In the Musée d'Art et d'Histoire du Judaïsme (Museum of Jewish Art and History) in Paris there are models of several wooden synagogues.

In 2026, an art installation Nabatele became part of the Yiddishland Pavilion on the Venice Biennale. Created by a Jewish-Ukrainian artist Anna Kamyshan, it is a shtetl-style wooden synagogue placed on a rock that floats 45 meters above water.
