= Andriy Bal =

Ukrainian footballer and coach

Andriy Bal Андрій Баль
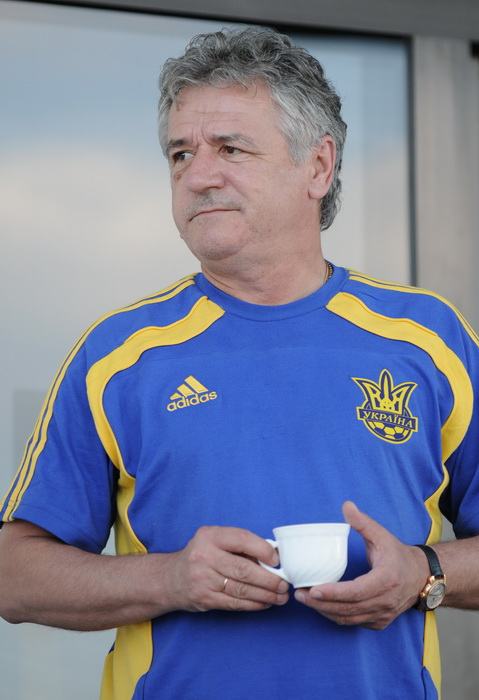
- Bal in 2011

Personal information
- Full name: Andriy Mykhaylovych Bal
- Date of birth: 16 February 1958
- Place of birth: Rozdil, Ukrainian SSR (now Ukraine)
- Date of death: 9 August 2014 (aged 56)
- Place of death: Kyiv, Ukraine
- Height: 1.78 m (5 ft 10 in)
- Position: Midfielder

Youth career
- –1971: DYuSSh Novyi Rozdil
- 1971–1975: OShISP Lviv
- 1975–1977: Karpaty Lviv

Senior career*
Years	Team	Apps	(Gls)
1977–1980	Karpaty Lviv	134	(12)
1981–1990	Dynamo Kyiv	240	(11)
1990–1991	Maccabi Tel Aviv	28	(4)
1991–1993	Bnei Yehuda	62	(3)
Total		464	(30)

International career
1990	USSR U-21	7	(0)
1981–1989	Soviet Union	20	(1)

Managerial career
- 1993–1998: Maccabi Haifa (assistant)
- 1998–1999: Maccabi Herzliya
- 1999–2000: Hakoah Ramat Gan
- 2000–2001: Dynamo Kyiv (assistant)
- 2001–2003: Vorskla Poltava
- 2003–2007: Ukraine (assistant)
- 2008: Moscow (assistant)
- 2009–2010: Chornomorets Odesa
- 2011–2012: Ukraine (assistant)
- 2012–2013: Dynamo Kyiv (assistant)
- 2012: Ukraine (caretaker)
Medal record
Men's football
Representing Soviet Union
FIFA U-20 World Cup
Winner	1977 Tunisia
UEFA European Under-21 Championship
Winner	1980 Europe
Winner	1990 Europe
UEFA European Under-19 Championship
Winner	1976 Hungary
- * Club domestic league appearances and goals

Andriy Mykhaylovych Bal (Ukrainian: Андрій Михайлович Баль; 16 February 1958 – 9 August 2014) was a Soviet and Ukrainian professional footballer who played as a midfielder and football manager.

== Club career ==
Born in Rozdil, Ukrainian SSR, Bal was a product of the Lviv youth football schools. By 1976 he was playing in the senior squad of Karpaty Lviv. After five years with the team, he earned a transfer to Dynamo Kyiv. He went on to spend the majority of his playing career with the team, winning four championship medals with them, as well as four Soviet Cups. He also picked up three runner-up medals. Another major achievement of his career with Dynamo Kyiv was winning the 1986 Cup Winners' Cup. In 1990, he left Dynamo to play in Israel with Maccabi Tel Aviv. He spent a season there before moving on to Bnei Yehuda, where he finished his playing career in 1993.

== International career ==
Bal played for the USSR national team 20 times, and scored 1 goal., a 20-meter strike in the game against Brazil at the 1982 FIFA World Cup in Spain. He represented the team at all levels and won the 1976 U-19 UEFA Championship, the 1977 FIFA World Youth Championship, twice won the U-21 UEFA Championship (in 1980 and 1990). He also played in the 1986 FIFA World Cup, where the Soviet team reached the Round of 16, losing to Belgium in extra-time.

== Coaching career ==
After retiring from playing Bal began coaching in Israel. His first coaching job was with Maccabi Haifa. From there he went on to coach Maccabi Herzliya and Hakoah Ramat Gan. In 2000, he returned to Ukraine to join the coaching staff of Dynamo Kyiv. In 2001, he became head-coach of Vorskla Poltava. After two seasons with them, he became Oleg Blokhin's assistant coach with the Ukraine national team. On 14 December 2007, he was officially announced as assistant-coach at FC Moscow, again moving there with Blokhin.

== Personal life ==
His brother Orest Bal was also a professional footballer.

== Death ==
Bal died on 9 August 2014 during a football match of veteran teams as a result of a blood clot. His death happened in between the deaths of two other famed Dynamo Kyiv players, Valyantsin Byalkevich (died 1 August 2014) and Andriy Husin (died 17 September 2014). The memorial for the three deceased players was held in Kyiv on 28 September 2014, followed by the veteran charity game.

== Honours ==
=== As player ===
Dynamo Kyiv

- UEFA Cup Winners' Cup: 1986
- Soviet Top League: 1981, 1985, 1986, 1990
- Soviet Cup: 1982, 1985, 1987, 1990

Karpaty Lviv

- Soviet First League: 1979

Bnei Yehuda

- Toto Cup: 1992

Soviet Union U21

- U-21 UEFA Championship: 1980, 1990

Soviet Union U20

- U-20 FIFA World Cup: 1977

Soviet Union U19

- U-19 UEFA Championship: 1976

=== As coach ===
Maccabi Haifa

- Israeli Championship: 1993–94
