= Nasielsk Synagogue =

Former synagogue in Nasielsk, Poland

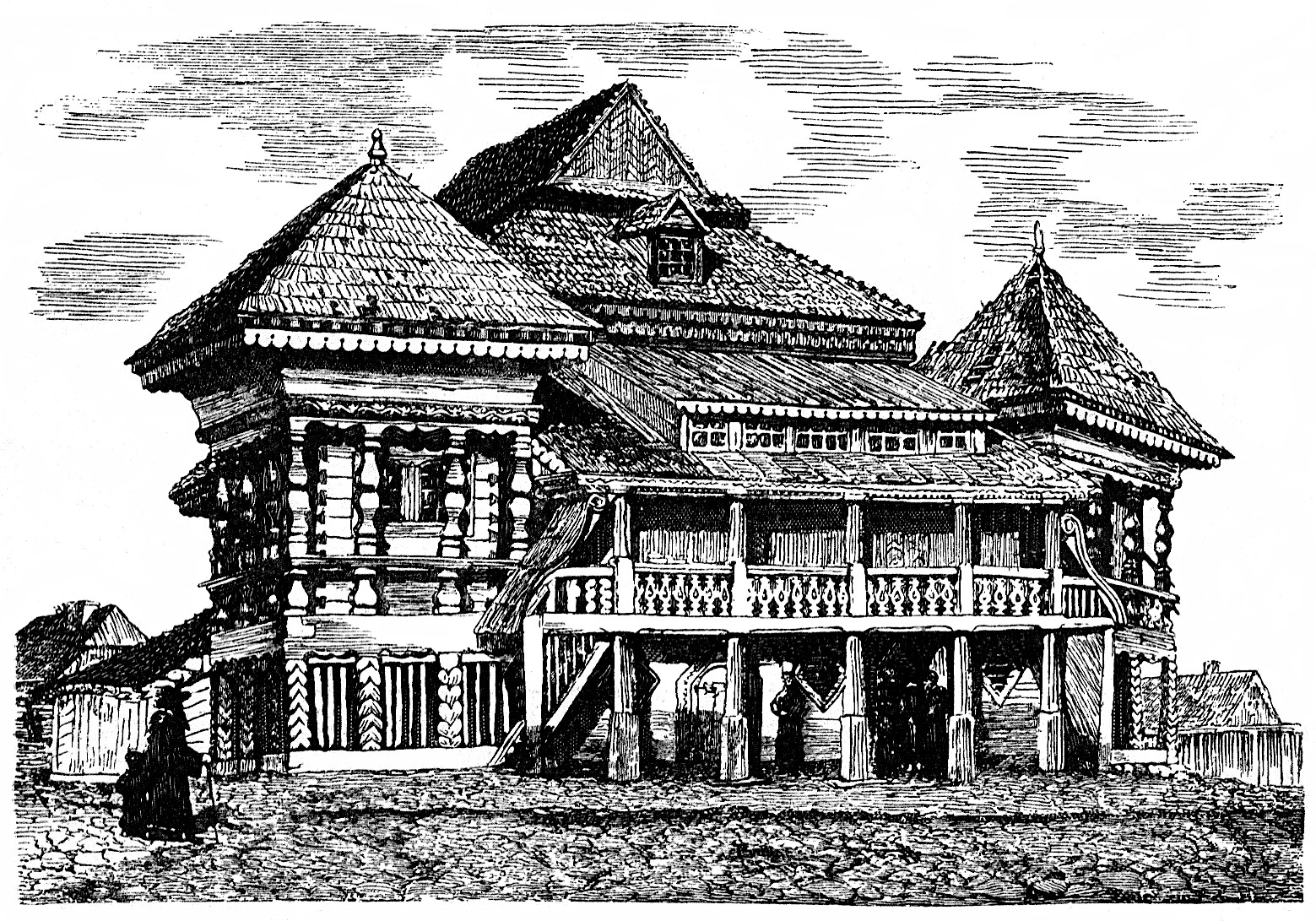
A 1900 illustration of the synagogue

The Nasielsk Synagogue was a notable vernacular wooden synagogue in Nasielsk, Poland. It was built in the late 17th century or early 18th century by Simcha Weiss, son of Shlomo of Lutsk. The deteriorating synagogue was demolished in 1880.

The first official inventory of important buildings in Poland, A General View of the Nature of Ancient Monuments in the Kingdom of Poland, led by Kazimierz Stronczynski from 1844 to 1855, describes the Nasielsk Synagogue as one of Poland's architecturally notable buildings.

The main hall of the synagogue was square. There were wings on each side that served as women's prayer areas. A women's prayer balcony was added above the vestibule in 1857. The synagogue had a two-tiered roof with dormer windows. The ceiling is thought to have been vaulted. The exterior featured a second story balcony and a pair of corner pavilions that contained stairs to the women's gallery. The exterior featured unusually elaborate railings, pillars and cornice trim. The wooden doors were adorned with a carved lion of Judah.

== See also ==
- Wooden synagogues in the Polish–Lithuanian Commonwealth
- List of wooden synagogues
- Nasielsk
