= Novyi Rozdil =

City in Lviv Oblast, Ukraine

Novyi Rozdil Новий Розділ
- City
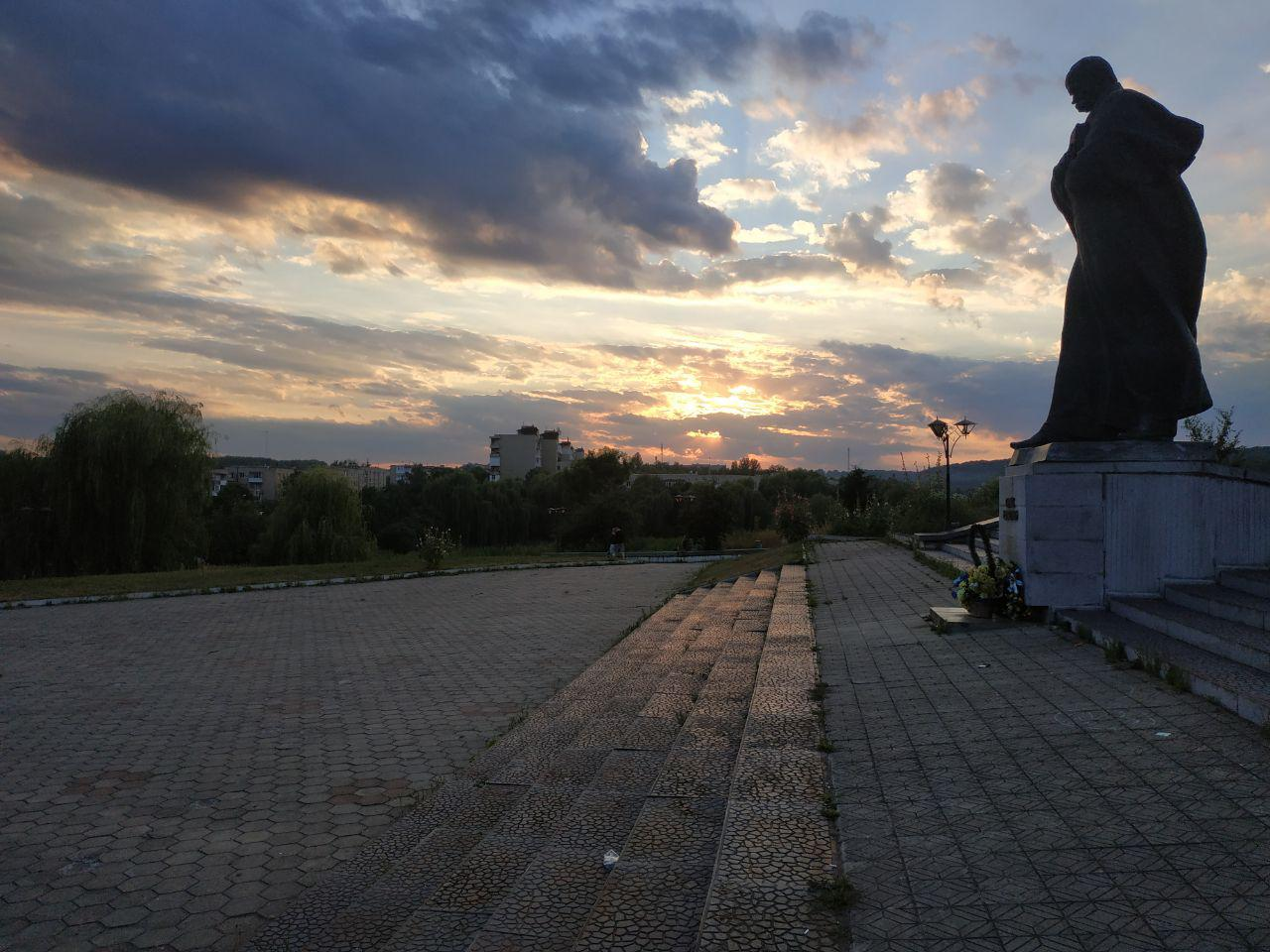
- Monument to Taras Shevchenko

- Flag Coat of arms

- Location within Lviv Oblast Location within Ukraine
- Coordinates: 49°28′11″N 24°08′12″E
- Country: Ukraine
- Oblast: Lviv Oblast
- Raion: Stryi Raion
- Hromada: Novyi Rozdil urban hromada

Area
  - Total: 23.6 km^{2} (9.1 sq mi)

Population (2023)
  - Total: 29,643
  - Density: 1,260/km^{2} (3,250/sq mi)
- Time zone: UTC+2 (EET)
  - Summer (DST): UTC+3 (EEST)
- Postal code: 81652
- Area code: +380-3261
- Website: https://novyyrozdil-gromada.gov.ua/

Novyi Rozdil (Ukrainian: Новий Розділ, IPA: [noˈwɪj rozˈd⁽ʲ⁾il]) is a city in Stryi Raion, Lviv Oblast (region) of Ukraine. Novyi Rozdil hosts the administration of Novyi Rozdil urban hromada, one of the hromadas of Ukraine. Population: 29,643 - 76.1% total population of Novyi Rozdil urban hromada (1 November 2023).

Until 18 July 2020, Novyi Rozdil was incorporated as a city of regional significance. In July 2020, as part of the administrative reform of Ukraine, which reduced the number of raions of Lviv Oblast to seven, the city of Novyi Rozdil was merged into Stryi Raion.

== International relations ==
=== Twin towns — Sister cities ===
Novyi Rozdil is twinned with:

- Police, Poland
- Pasewalk, Germany
- Saintes, France

== Notable people ==
- Les Panchyshyn, artist
- Olha Freimut, television presenter
