= Les Panchyshyn =

Ukrainian artist (born 1979)

- Born: Les Panchyshyn; 26 October 1991 (age 34); Novyi Rozdil, Ukraine
- Education: Ivan Trush Lviv State College of Decorative and Applied Arts
- Known for: Painting

Les Panchyshyn is a Ukrainian visual artist, photographer, music video maker, sculptor. He is known for his work in painting, video art and multimedia projects, which often combine traditional and modern art style. His work incorporates elements of philosophical inquiry and visual experimentation, focusing on themes related to human experience, culture, and identity. It often engages with non-traditional forms, symbols, and materials to examine contemporary social and cultural issues. Panchyshyn has participated in exhibitions in Ukraine, the United States and Europe.

== Biography ==
Les Panchyshyn was born on October 26, 1991, in Novyi Rozdil, Lviv region, Ukraine. In his early childhood, his family moved to Lviv, where he began his primary education and attended a local music school where he studied violin.

In 2000, he began his formal art education at the Oleksa Novakivskyi Lviv Art School for Children. Later, he entered the Lviv State Academy of Decorative and Applied Arts, where he initially specialized in art ceramics under the guidance of Taras Levkov.

During her studies, Panchyshyn developed an interest in photography and had several group and solo exhibitions between 2007 and 2009. In 2009, he won a prize in a photography competition organized by Ukrsotsbank.

In his junior year, he switched his focus from ceramics to painting and began experimenting with video production and editing. In 2010, he won a prize in the painting competition "Lviv in the eyes of Young People".

After graduating from the Trash Academy in 2011, he was admitted to the Lviv State Academy of Arts, where he continued his education in fine arts.

== Early career (2012-2015) ==
Between 2012 and 2014, Panchyshyn was part of the SLAVA FROLOVA GROUP, a Ukrainian curatorial platform that supports emerging artists.

In 2012, Les Panchyshyn became interested in video art and started working on music videos for young Ukrainian artists. Les shot videos for Olesya Kyrychuk, rock bands Rock-H, Patricia, Panchyshyn, Svitlana Tarabarova, "Yariko", "Natalka Karpa" Worked on concert videos for the bands Antitela, Piccardian Tertsia, Tartak, Komu Vnyz, Gapochka, Shadow of the Sun, Vivienne Mort".

He has also collaborated with cultural institutions such as Staryi Lev Publishing House and participated in audiovisual projects for the media platform "Ukrainians" and the ShchedreEtno Music Festival.

== Transformation and Exhibition (2016-2020) ==
In 2016, Panchyshyn moved to Kyiv, where he became increasingly active in solo and group exhibitions. His work is exhibited in galleries and art Spaces in Ukraine as well as in Austria, Germany, France, Belgium and the United States.

In 2017, he joined the band PANCHYSHYN*, working as a musician as well as an illustrator.

In 2017 and 2018, he has illustrated two children's books: That's Lviv (2017), and Winter King (2018), both published by Vydavnytstvo Staryi Lev.

That year, he curated two plein air painting events at Edem Resort & Spa, culminating in an exhibition at Edem Art Space.

Panchyshyn became a member of the public organization VILNI, through which he contributed to the traveling exhibition project "Art Cube", which was presented in several Ukrainian cities.

In 2020, Les Panchyshyn Gallery is hosting an exhibition at the Grand Hotel Lviv, bringing together artists from different regions. After completion, all the paintings were presented at Les Panchyshyn Gallery in Kyiv.

== International Work and Society Program (2021-2022) ==
In 2021, Panchyshyn had a solo exhibition at the National Museum of Ukraine in Chicago. That year, he collaborated with a Ukrainian brand Overall that creates clothing collections. He made limited edition cargo pants with his paintings on them and exhibited them at Ukrainian Fashion Week. He also worked on a commercial design project with the water company Khotkov.

In collaboration with the energy company DTEK, he contributed to the "Lelechenki" project, creating two sculptures in Kyiv (VDNH) and Odesa (Park of Glory). At the end of 2021, he received the "Best new exhibitor" at Miami Art week.

Panchyshyn took part in a charity tour in the United States organized by the Resurrected Soldiers of Ukraine to support healthcare for Ukrainian veterans. Thirteen of his paintings were donated for auction, and others were featured in a charity exhibition at the ARTSY Gallery in New York. The funds were used for the treatment and prosthetics of our military.

After the escalation of the Russian invasion in 2022, he donated the proceeds of more than 20 artworks to Ukrainian charities, including "Come Back Alive (Prytula Foundation)" and the Pritura Foundation.

== Recent works (2023) ==
In 2023, Panchyshyn collaborated with Dtek to present a public sculpture called "Light will Conquer Darkness" in Irpin. The project raised funds for the purchase of drones for the Ukrainian armed forces.

He also had a solo exhibition at the Ritz Hotel in Miami and exhibited at Piccadillo Gallery. His painting series "Ukraine Forever" was exhibited at a public event hosted by the mayor of Sunny Island Beach (Miami) and was later transferred to the mayor's office and are exhibited there.

His painting "A New Hope" was auctioned at a charity event organized by All Hands and Hearts coordinated by the Center for Saving Uklan in Miami. The artwork raised $17,000 for the reconstruction of the Ukrainian city.

Panchyshyn took part in international exhibitions in 2023, in the joint exhibition "Hope for the lights" (Vienna) with Ivan Marchuk at the Barbareum Art Space, and in the group exhibition "Milk and Blood" in Estonia. His work has also been exhibited at the galleries Amart, the Infinity Academy (Vienna) and the Bruce Lurie Gallery in New York and the Hamptons Art Fair.

== Education ==
Panchyshyn studied at the Lviv Children's Art School named after O. Novakivskyi and later graduated from the Lviv State Academy of Decorative and Applied Arts named after Ivan Trush. He went on to study at the Lviv National Academy of Arts and Art Students League of New York

== Family ==
Panchyshyn comes from a family with a background in music and art. His father, Oreste Panchishin, was a session musician who performed with the Plast Band and now plays in the band "Patricia". His mother, Iryna Panchyshyn, was a musician and poet. His brother Ostap Panchyshyn is a singer and composer who leads the music project PANCHYSHYN.

He is married to Anna Panchyshyn and has two children, a daughter named Maria Lazebna and a son named Leonardo Panchyshyn.
