= Zaniomanskaja Synagogue =

Former synagogue in Hrodna, Belarus

- Belarusian: Занёманская сынагога
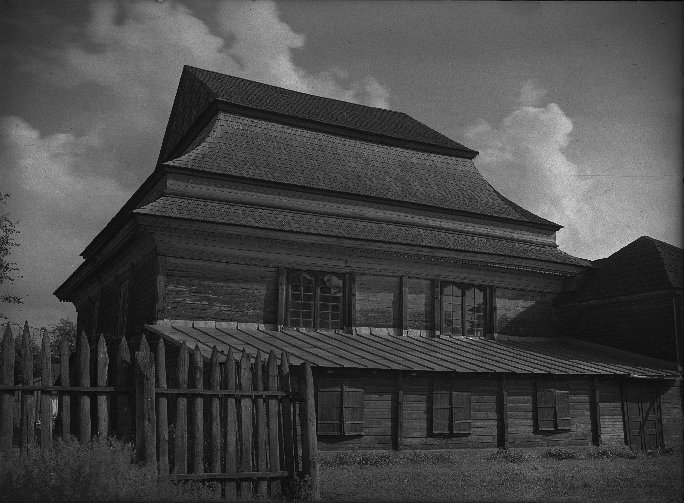

- Location of the former synagogue in Belarus

Religion
- Affiliation: Judaism (former)
- Ecclesiastical or organizational status: Synagogue (c. 1750–c. 1940)
- Status: Destroyed

Location
- Location: Grodno, Grodno Region
- Country: Belarus
- Interactive map of Zaniomanskaja Synagogue
- Coordinates: 53°40′15″N 23°49′30″E

Architecture
- Type: Synagogue architecture
- Style: Wooden
- Completed: c. 1750
- Destroyed: during World War II

Specifications
- Length: 28.5 metres (94 ft)
- Width: 19 metres (62 ft)
- Height (max): 12.5 metres (41 ft)

Zaniomanskaja Synagogue (Belarusian: Занёманская сынагога; Polish: Synagoga drewniana w Grodnie) was a vernacular wooden synagogue located in the city of Grodno, in Belarus. It was built in c. 1750 in what was then the Polish–Lithuanian Commonwealth. The synagogue was damaged by a fire in 1899 and then rebuilt, adding two small corner buildings. It was destroyed by the Germans during World War II.

== Description ==
The synagogue building was 28.5 metres (94 ft) long, 19 metres (62 ft) wide and 12.5 metres (41 ft) high. There was a separate section for women in the northern and southern part of the ground floor and in the gallery.

The walls were richly decorated with biblical verses and prayers. Following the example of Polish landowners' seats, at the façade there were corner alcoves, often used in synagogues in the mid-18th century.

In the interbellum period (1918–1939), Professor Oskar Sosnowski from the Department of Architecture of the Polytechnic of Warsaw and photographer and art historian Szymon Zajczyk directed architects to create extensive documentation of the wooden synagogues. They created architectural drawings, replica paintings, and photographs. Much of this project was destroyed during World War II but a substantial amount survived.

The synagogue in Grodno was measured and photographed in 1928.

== Gallery ==
Interior

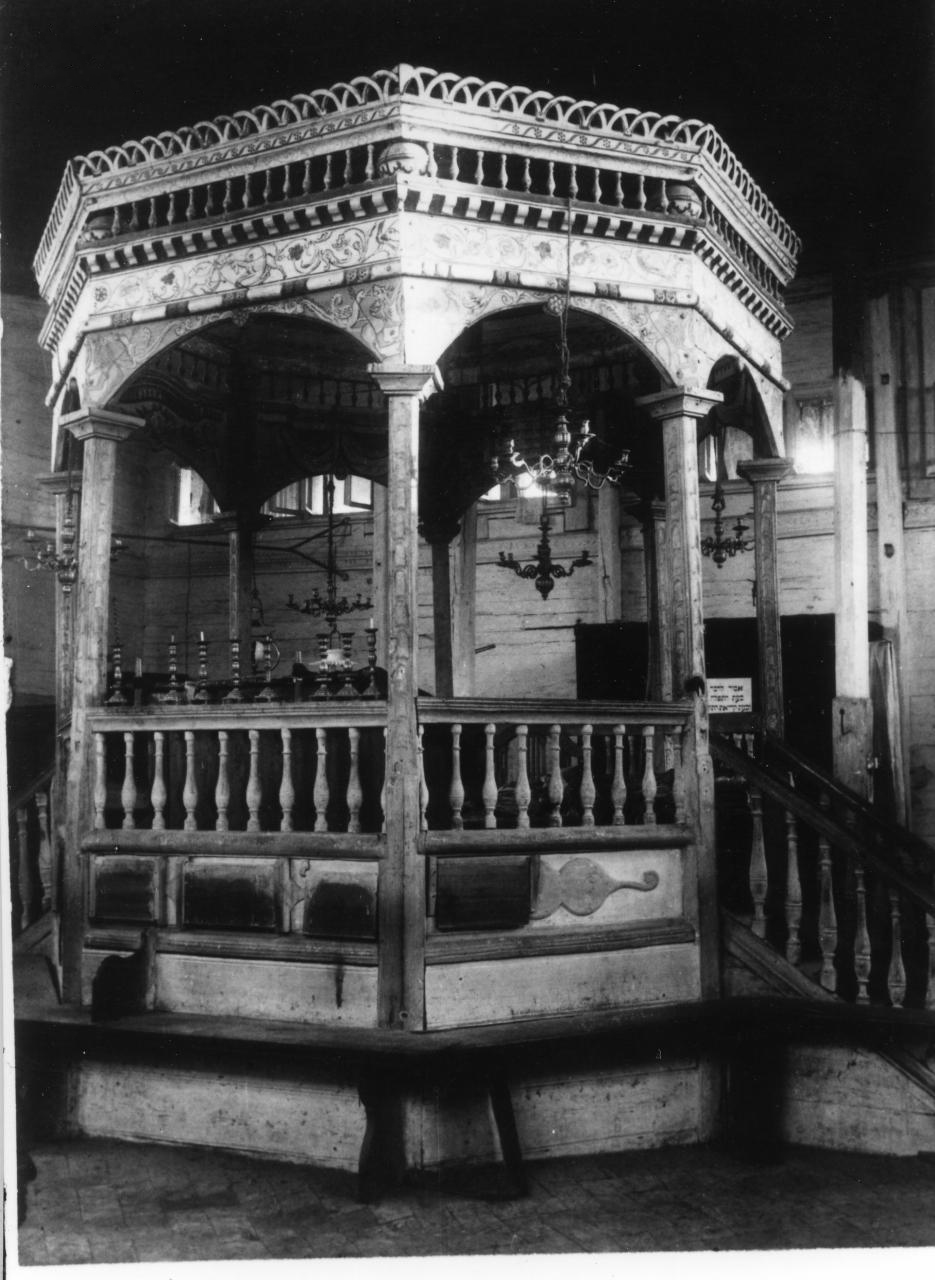

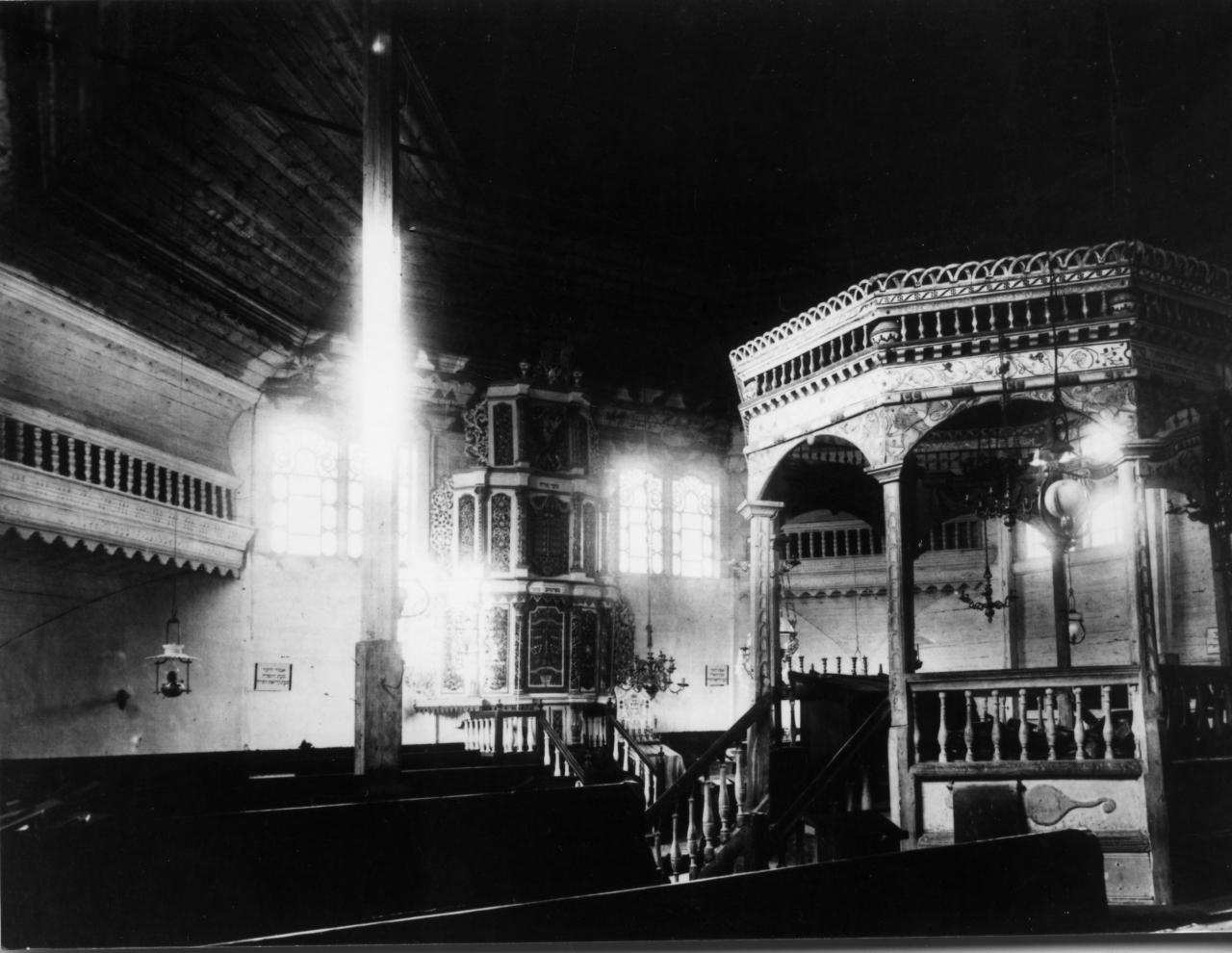

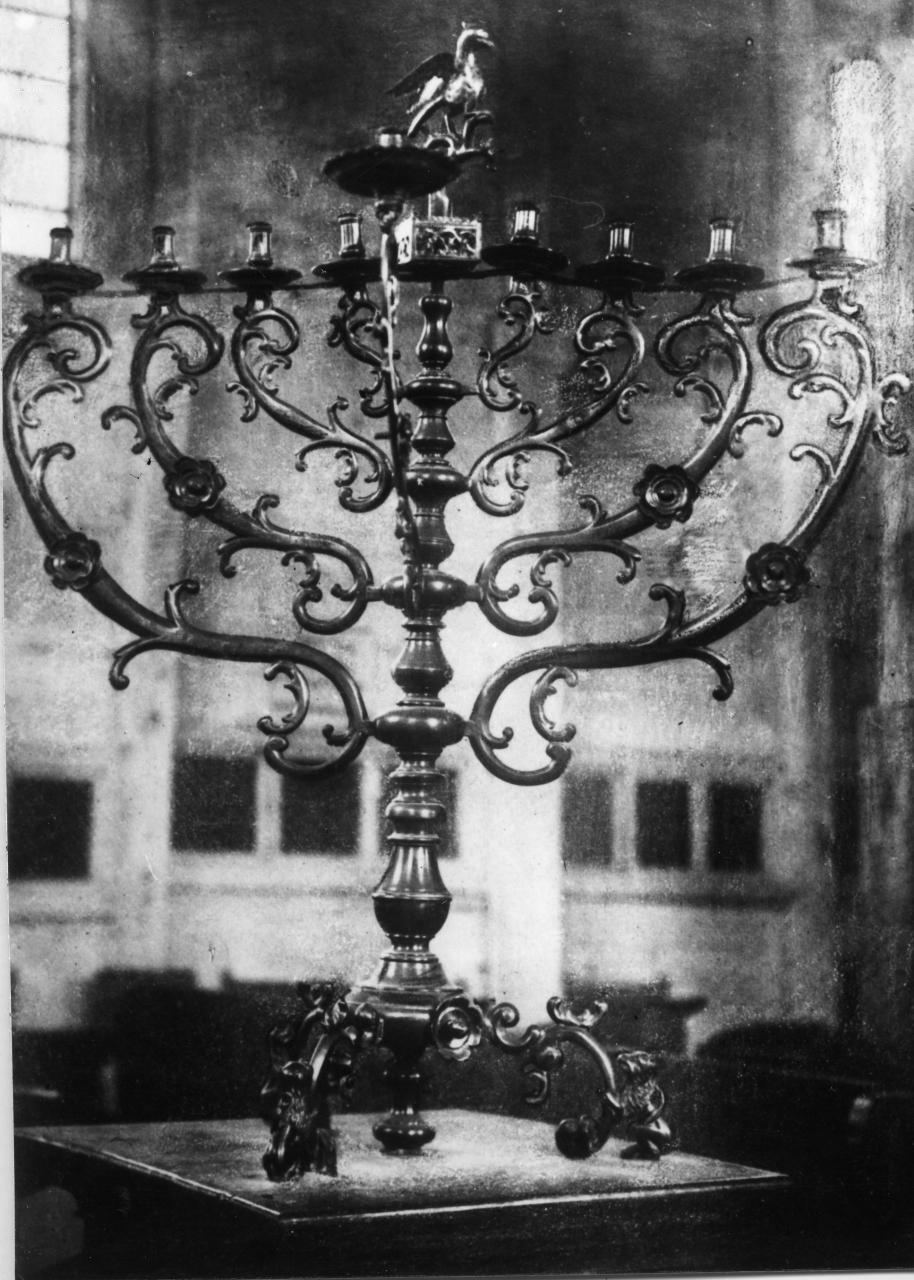

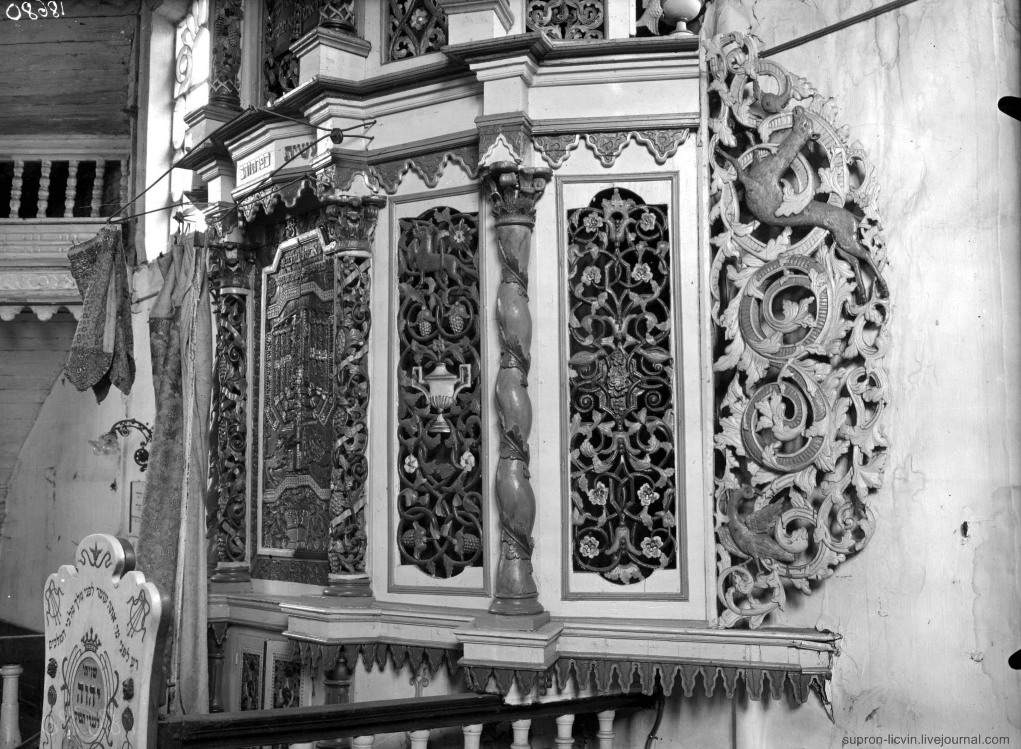

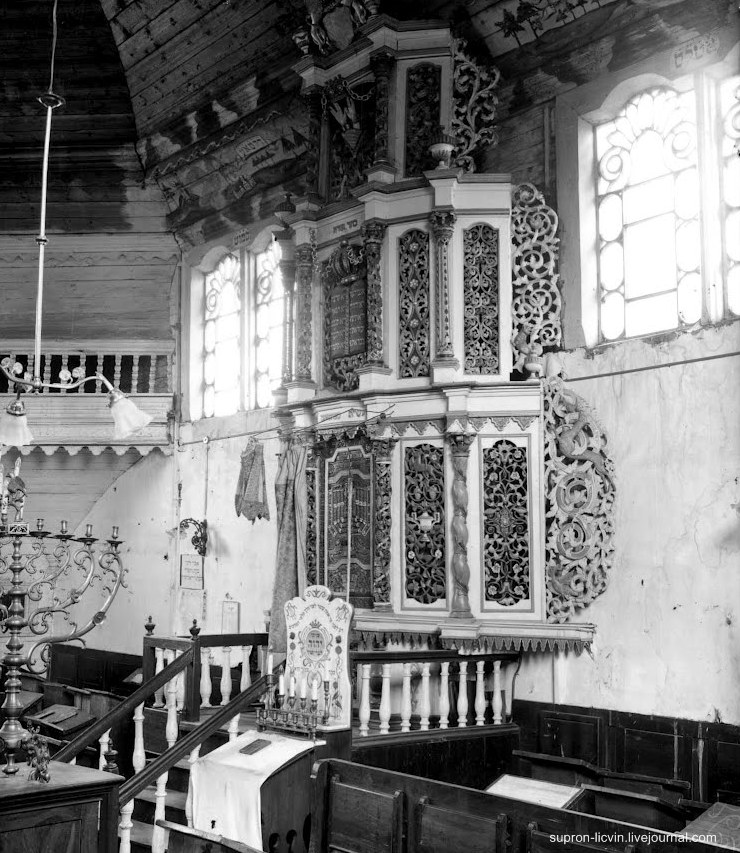

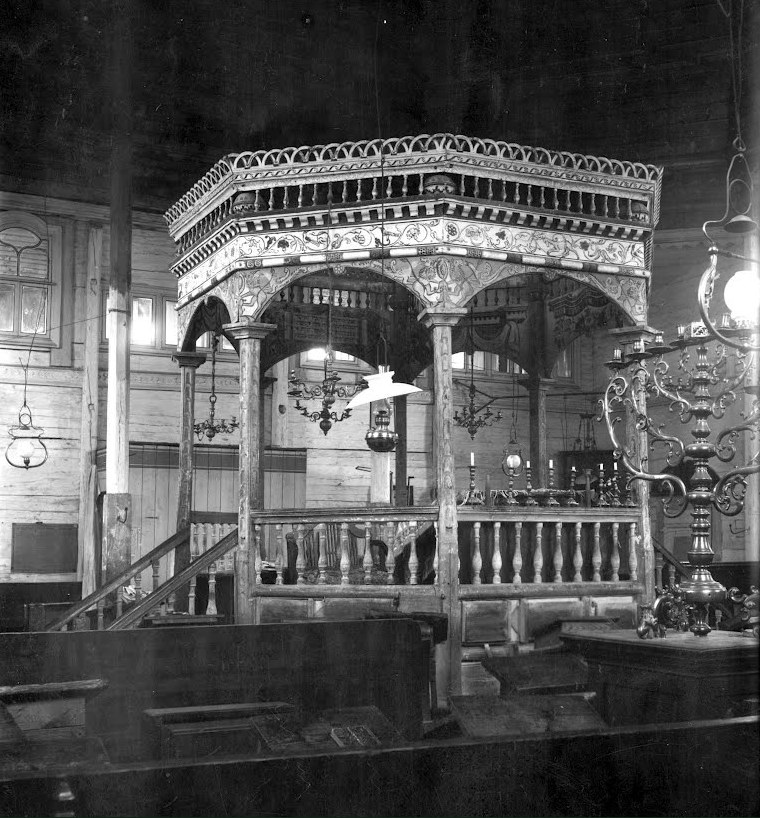

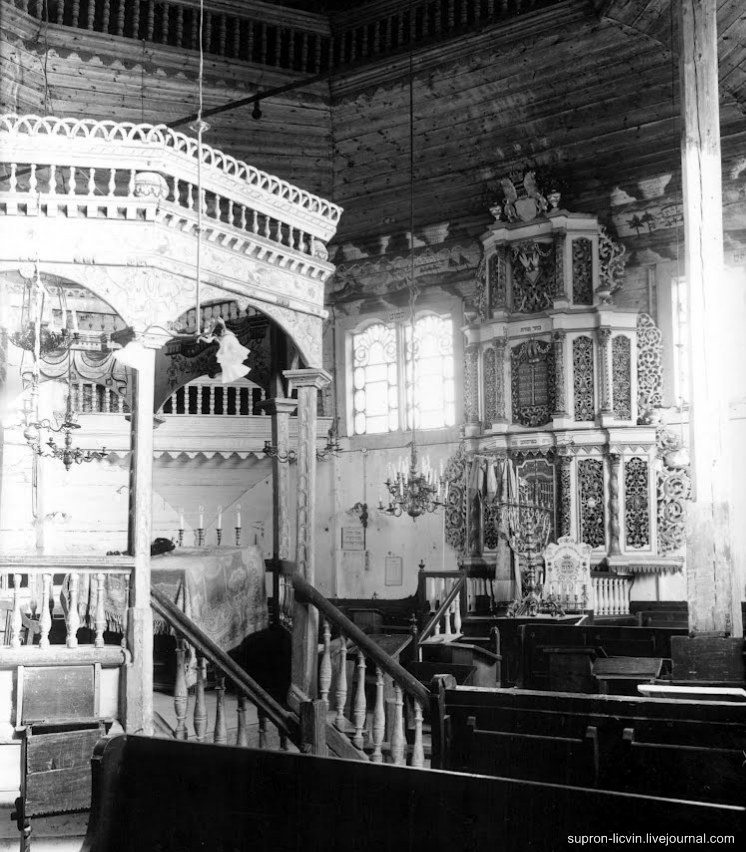
