= Novyi Rozdil urban hromada =

Hromada in Lviv Oblast, Ukraine

Novyi Rozdil urban hromada Новороздільська міська громада
- Hromada
- Seal
- Interactive map of Novyi Rozdil urban hromada
- Country: Ukraine
- Oblast: Lviv Oblast
- Raion: Stryi Raion
- Admin. center: Novyi Rozdil

Area
  - Total: 1,008 km^{2} (389 sq mi)

Population (2021)
  - Total: 36,945
  - Density: 36.65/km^{2} (94.93/sq mi)
- CATOTTG code: UA46100150000087495
- Settlements: 10
- Cities: 1
- Rural settlements: 1
- Villages: 8
- Website: novyyrozdil-gromada.gov.ua

Novyi Rozdil urban hromada (Ukrainian: Новороздільська міська громада) is a hromada in Ukraine, in Stryi Raion of Lviv Oblast. The administrative center is the city of Novyi Rozdil.

== Settlements ==
The hromada consists of 1 city (Novyi Rozdil), 1 rural settlement (Rozdil) and 8 villages:

- Berezdivtsi
- Berezyna
- Horishnie
- Hranky-Kuty
- Dolishnie
- Pidhirtsi
- Stankivtsi
- Tuzhanivtsi
