= Rozdil =

Rural locality in Lviv Oblast, Ukraine

Rozdil Розділ
- Rural settlement
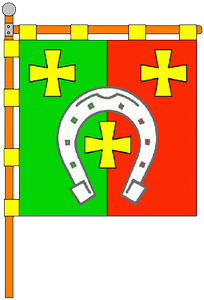
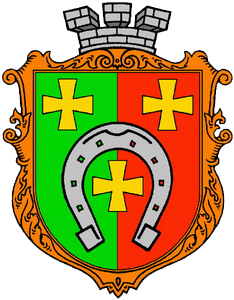
- Flag Seal

- Location in Lviv Oblast Location in Ukraine
- Coordinates: 49°27′43″N 24°03′44″E
- Country: Ukraine
- Oblast: Lviv Oblast
- Raion: Stryi Raion
- Hromada: Novyi Rozdil urban hromada

Population (2022)
  - Total: 2,393
- Time zone: UTC+2 (EET)
  - Summer (DST): UTC+3 (EEST)

Rozdil (Ukrainian: Розділ) is a rural settlement in Stryi Raion of Lviv Oblast in Ukraine. It is located close to the right bank of the Dniester. Rozdil belongs to Novyi Rozdil urban hromada, one of the hromadas of Ukraine. Population: 2,393 (2022 estimate).

== History ==
Until 18 July 2020, Rozdil belonged to Mykolaiv Raion. The raion was abolished in July 2020 as part of the administrative reform of Ukraine, which reduced the number of raions of Lviv Oblast to seven. The area of Mykolaiv Raion was merged into Stryi Raion.

Until 26 January 2024, Rozdil was designated urban-type settlement. On this day, a new law entered into force which abolished this status, and Rozdil became a rural settlement.

== Economy ==
=== Transportation ===
Rozdil is connected by roads with Mykolaiv, where there is access to Highway M06 connecting Lviv with Uzhhorod. It also has access to Highway M12 connecting Stryi and Ternopil.

The closest railway station, Mykolaiv-Dnistrovskyi, is located about 10 kilometres (6.2 mi) northeast of the settlement, on the railway connecting Stryi and Lviv.
