= Chortovets =

Rural locality in Ivano-Frankivsk Oblast, Ukraine

Coordinates: 48°42′N 25°17′E

Chortovets Чортовець
- Village
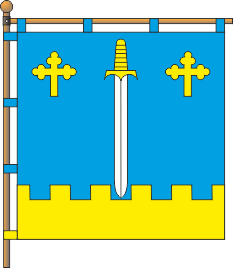
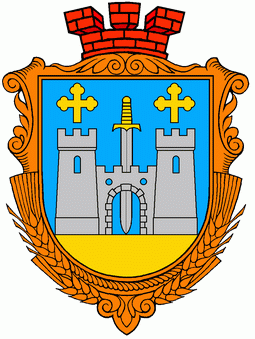
- Flag Coat of arms
- Interactive map of Chortovets
- Country: Ukraine
- Oblast: Ivano-Frankivsk
- Raion: Kolomyia
- Hromada: Horodenka urban hromada

Chortovets (Ukrainian: Чортовець, Polish: Czortowiec, Hebrew: צ'ורטובייץ) is a village, located near Horodenka and Obertyn in Kolomyia Raion, Ivano-Frankivsk Oblast (province) of western Ukraine. It belongs to Horodenka urban hromada, one of the hromadas of Ukraine. In 1976–1993 it was named Nazarenkove.

Until 18 July 2020, Chortovets belonged to Horodenka Raion. The raion was abolished in July 2020 as part of the administrative reform of Ukraine, which reduced the number of raions of Ivano-Frankivsk Oblast to six. The area of Horodenka Raion was merged into Kolomyia Raion.

== Notable residents ==
- Olha Pleshkan (1898–1985), Ukrainian painter, graphic artist
