= Galicia (Eastern Europe) =

Historical region

Coordinates: 49.8300°N 24.0142°E

Galicia Galizia
- Historical region
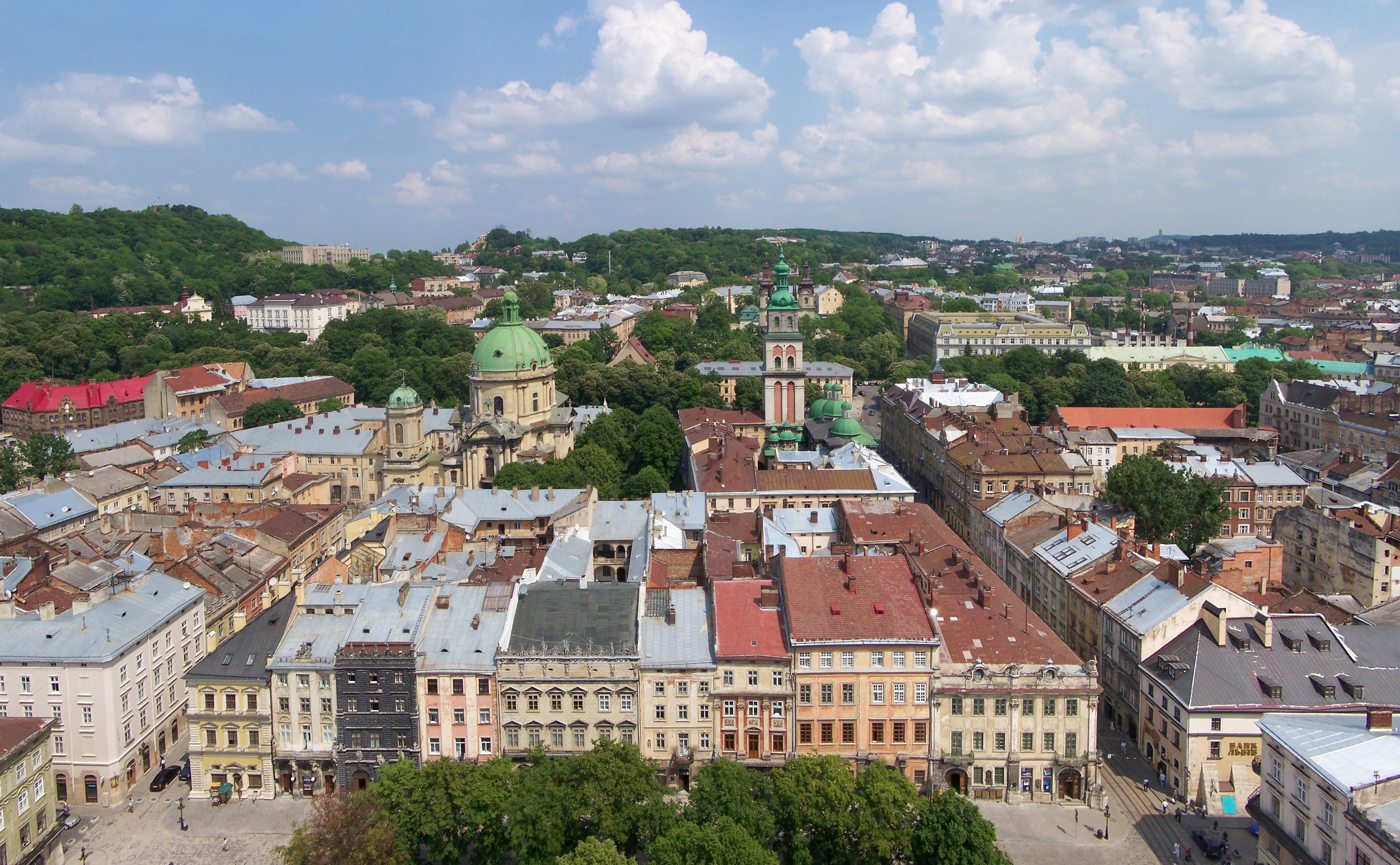
- View of the historical center of Lviv

- Flag Coat of arms

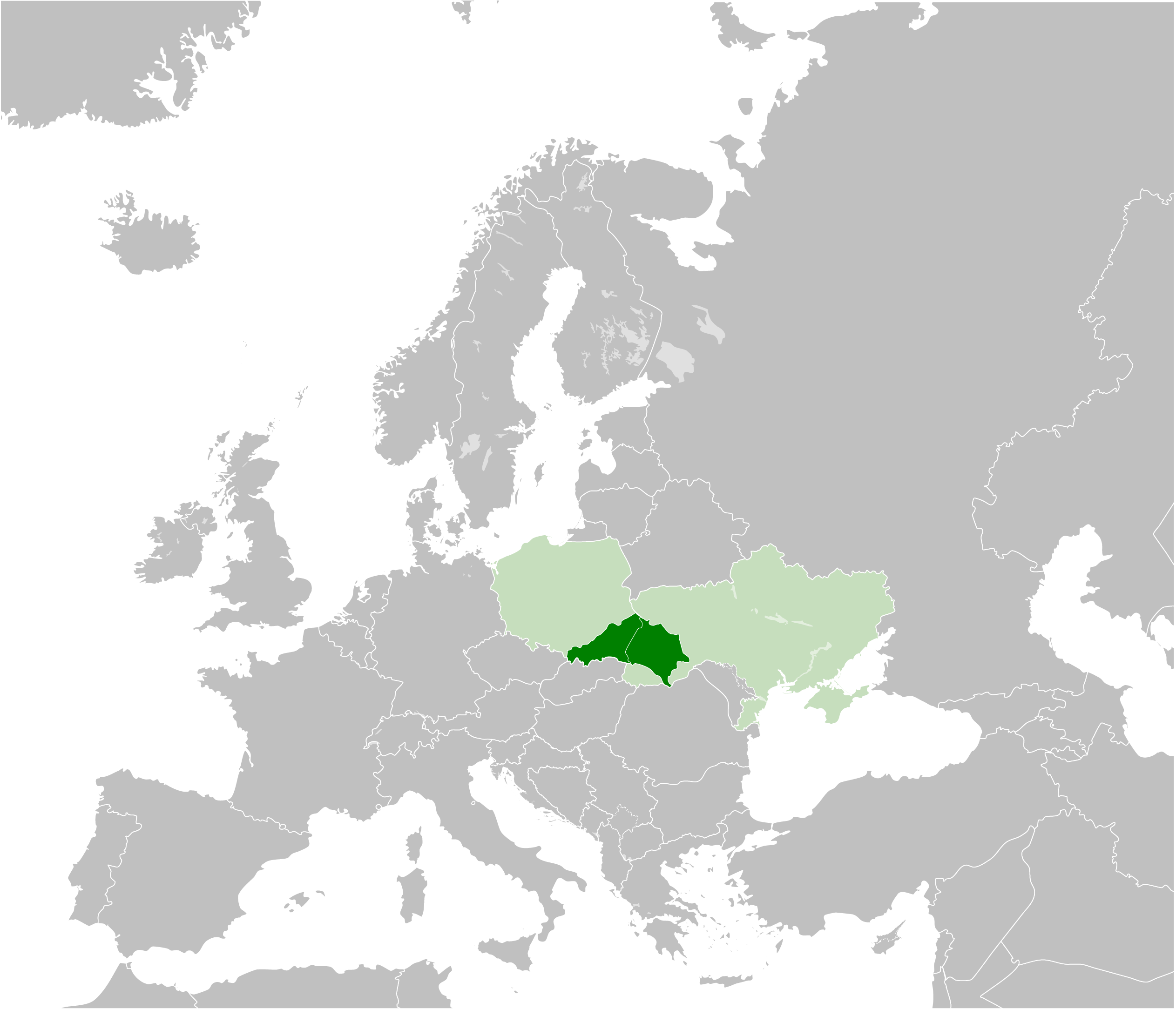
- Galicia (dark green) superimposed on modern-day Poland and Ukraine (light green)
- Country: Poland; Ukraine
- Largest cities: Kraków; Lviv

Area
  - Total: 78,497 km^{2} (30,308 sq mi)

Population (1910)
  - Total: 8,025,723
  - Density: 102.24/km^{2} (264.81/sq mi)
- Demonym: Galician
- Time zones: UTC+2 (EET)
  - Summer (DST): UTC+3 (EEST)
- UTC+1 (CET)
  - Summer (DST): UTC+2 (CEST)

Galicia (/ɡəˈlɪʃ(i)ə/ gə-LISH-(ee-)ə; Polish: Galicja, IPA: [ɡaˈlit͡sja]; Ukrainian: Галичина, romanized: Halychyna, IPA: [ɦɐlɪtʃɪˈnɑ]; Yiddish: גאַליציע, romanized: Galitsye; see below) is a historical and geographic region spanning what has become southeastern Poland and western Ukraine, long part of the Polish–Lithuanian Commonwealth. It covers much of the other historic regions of Red Ruthenia (centered on Lviv) and Lesser Poland (centered on Kraków).

The name of the region derives from the medieval city of Halych, and was first mentioned in Hungarian historical chronicles in the year 1206 as Galiciæ. The eastern part of the region was controlled by the medieval Kingdom of Galicia–Volhynia before it was annexed by the Kingdom of Poland in 1352 and became part of the Ruthenian Voivodeship. During the partitions of Poland, it was incorporated into a crown land of the Austrian Empire—the Kingdom of Galicia and Lodomeria.

The nucleus of historic Galicia lies within the modern regions of western Ukraine: the Lviv, Ternopil, and Ivano-Frankivsk oblasts near Halych. In the 18th century, territories that later became part of the modern Polish regions of the Lesser Poland Voivodeship, Subcarpathian Voivodeship, and Silesian Voivodeship were added to Galicia after the collapse of the Polish–Lithuanian Commonwealth.

Eastern Galicia became contested ground between Poland and Ruthenia in medieval times and was fought over by Austria-Hungary and Russia during World War I and also fought over by Poland and Ukraine later in the 20th century. In the 10th and 11th centuries, several cities were founded there, such as Volodymyr and Jaroslaw, whose names mark their connections with the Grand Princes of Kiev, Vladimir the Great and Yaroslav the Wise. There is considerable overlap between Galicia and Podolia (to the east) as well as between Galicia and southwest Ruthenia, especially in a cross-border region (centred on Carpathian Ruthenia) inhabited by various nationalities and religious groups.

== Origins and variations of the name ==
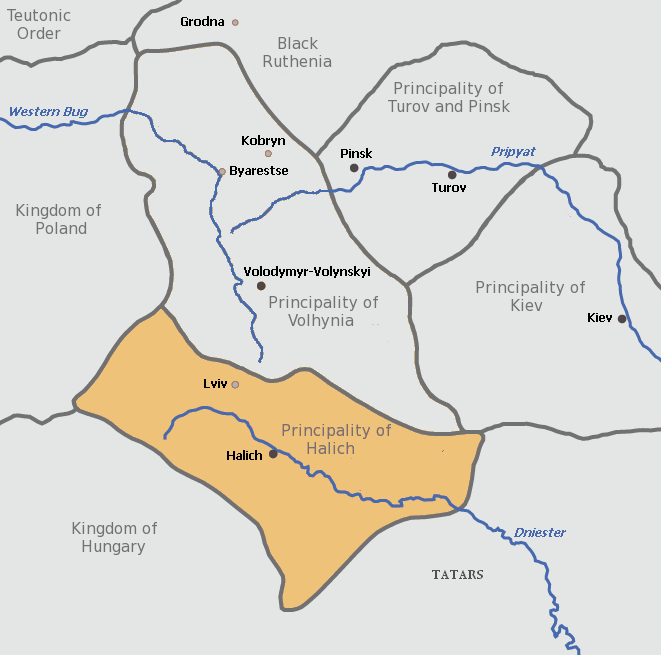
Map of the Principality of Galicia in the 13th century, which formed the nucleus of what later became Galicia

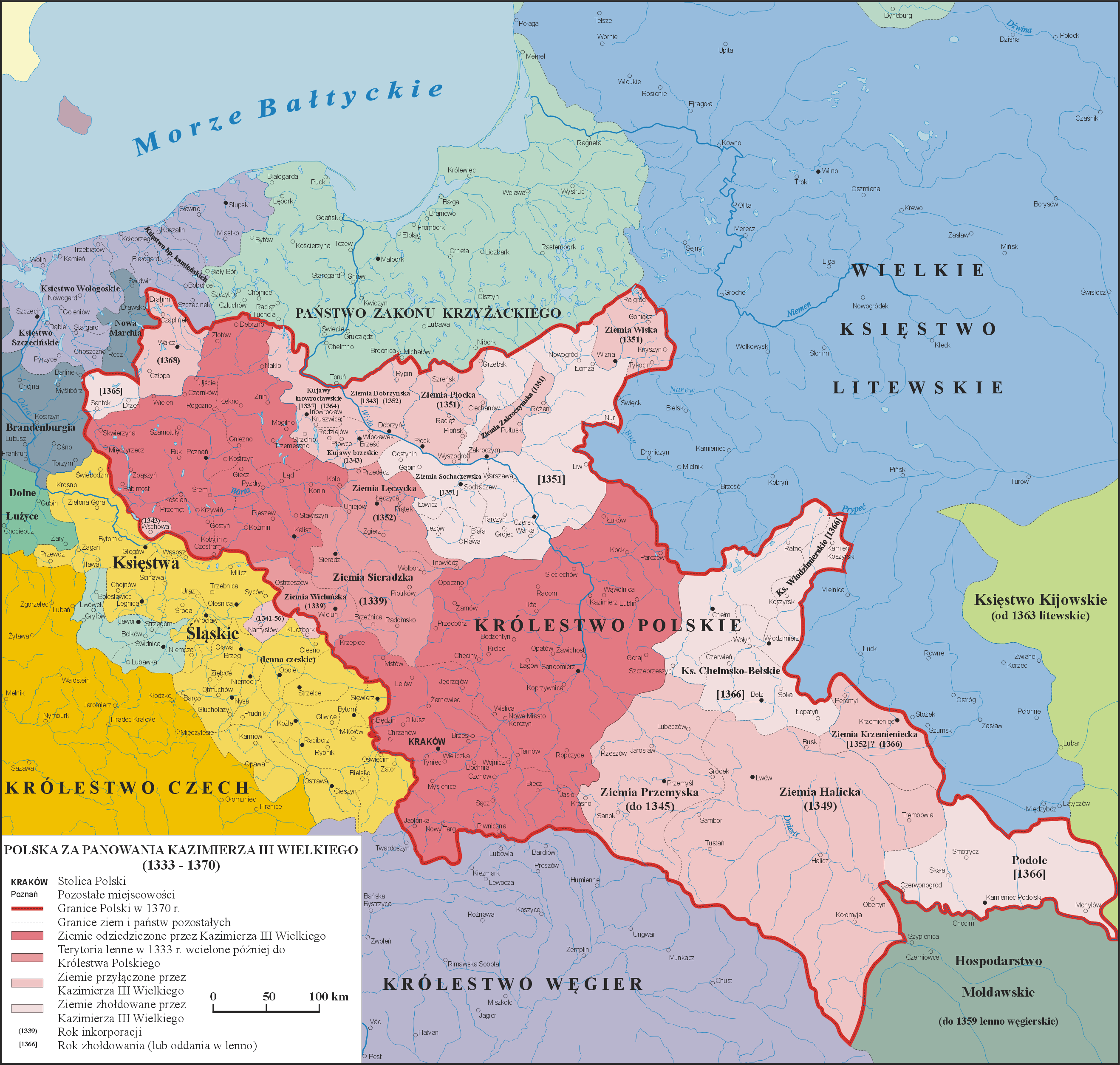
Annexation of the Kingdom of Ruthenia by the Kingdom of Poland as part of the Galicia–Volhynia Wars (1340–1392)

The name of the region in the local languages is:

- Ukrainian: Галичина, romanized: Halychyna;
- Polish: Galicja
- Rusyn: Галичина, romanized: Halyčyna;
- Russian: Галиция, romanized: Galitsiya;
- Czech and Slovak: Halič;
- German: Galizien;
- Hungarian: Galícia/Gácsország/Halics;
- Romanian: Galiția/Halicia;
- Yiddish: גאַליציע, romanized: Galitsye.

Some historians (Note: Encyclopediaofukraine.com: Volodymyr Kubiyovych, Yaroslav Pasternak, Illya Vytanovych, Arkadiy Zhukovsky.) speculated that the name had to do with a group of people of Thracian origin (i.e. Getae) who during the Iron Age moved into the area after the Roman conquest of Dacia in 106 CE and may have formed the Lypytsia culture with the Venedi people who moved into the region at the end of La Tène period. The Lypytsia culture supposedly replaced the existing Thracian Hallstatt (see Thraco-Cimmerian) and Vysotske cultures. Some other scholars assert that the name Halych has Slavic origins – from halytsa, meaning "a naked (unwooded) hill", or from halka which means "jackdaw". (The jackdaw featured as a charge in the city's coat of arms and later also in the coat of arms of Galicia-Lodomeria. The name, however, predates the coat of arms, which may represent canting or simply folk etymology). Although Ruthenians drove out the Hungarians from Halych-Volhynia by 1221, Hungarian kings continued to add Galicia et Lodomeria to their official titles.

In 1349, in the course of the Galicia–Volhynia Wars, King Casimir III the Great of Poland conquered the major part of Galicia and put an end to the independence of this territory. Upon the conquest Casimir adopted the following title:

Casimir by the grace of God king of Poland and Rus (Ruthenia), lord and heir of the land of Kraków, Sandomierz, Sieradz, Łęczyca, Kuyavia, Pomerania (Pomerelia). Latin: Kazimirus, Dei gratia rex Polonie et Rusie, nec non-Cracovie, Sandomirie, Siradie, Lancicie, Cuiavie, et Pomeranieque Terrarum et Ducatuum Dominus et Heres.

Under the Jagiellonian dynasty (Kings of Poland from 1386 to 1572), the Kingdom of Poland revived and reconstituted its territories. In place of historic Galicia there appeared the Ruthenian Voivodeship.

In 1526, after the death of Louis II of Hungary, the Habsburgs inherited the Hungarian claims to the titles of the Kingship of Galicia and Lodomeria, together with the Hungarian crown. In 1772 the Habsburg Empress Maria Theresa, Archduchess of Austria and Queen of Hungary, used those historical claims to justify her participation in the First Partition of Poland. In fact, the territories acquired by Austria did not correspond exactly to those of former Halych-Volhynia – the Russian Empire took control of Volhynia to the north-east, including the city of Volodymyr-Volynskyi (Włodzimierz Wołyński) – after which Lodomeria was named. On the other hand, much of Lesser Poland – Nowy Sącz and Przemyśl (1772–1918), Zamość (1772–1809), Lublin (1795–1809), and Kraków (1846–1918) – became part of Austrian Galicia. Moreover, despite the fact that Austria's claim derived from the historical Hungarian crown, "Galicia and Lodomeria" were not officially assigned to Hungary, and after the Ausgleich of 1867, the territory found itself in Cisleithania, or the Austrian-administered part of Austria-Hungary.

The full official name of the new Austrian territory was the Kingdom of Galicia and Lodomeria with the Duchies of Auschwitz and Zator. After the incorporation of the Free City of Kraków in 1846, it was extended to Kingdom of Galicia and Lodomeria, and the Grand Duchy of Kraków with the Duchies of Auschwitz and Zator (German: Königreich Galizien und Lodomerien mit dem Großherzogtum Krakau und den Herzogtümern Auschwitz und Zator).

Each of those entities was formally separate; they were listed as such in the Austrian emperor's titles, each had its distinct coat-of-arms and flag. For administrative purposes, however, they formed a single province. The duchies of Auschwitz (Oświęcim) and Zator were small historical principalities west of Kraków, on the border with Prussian Silesia. Lodomeria, under the name Volhynia, remained under the rule of the Russian Empire – see Volhynian Governorate.

== History ==
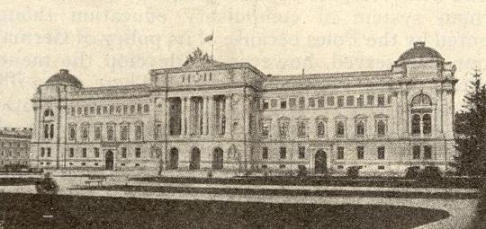
The legislative Diet of Galicia and Lodomeria was located in the capital city, Lemberg.

In Roman times, the region was populated by various tribes of Celto-Germanic admixture, including Celtic-based tribes, the Lugians, Cotini, Vandals and Goths (the Przeworsk and Púchov cultures). During the Migration Period, a variety of nomadic groups invaded the area. The East Slavic tribes White Croats and Tivertsi dominated the area since the 6th century until it was annexed to Kievan Rus' in the 10th century.

In the 12th century, the Principality of Galicia was formed, which merged at the end of the century with neighbouring Volhynia into the Kingdom of Galicia–Volhynia. Galicia and Volhynia had originally been two separate Rurikid principalities, assigned on a rotating basis to younger members of the Kievan dynasty. The line of Prince Roman the Great of Volodymyr had held the Principality of Volhynia, while the line of Yaroslav Osmomysl held the Principality of Galicia. Galicia–Volhynia was created following the death in 1198 or 1199 (and without a recognised heir in the paternal line) of the last Prince of Galicia, Vladimir II Yaroslavich; Roman acquired the Principality of Galicia and united his lands into one state. Roman's successors would mostly use Halych (Galicia) as the designation of their combined kingdom. In Roman's time Galicia–Volhynia's principal cities were Halych and Volodymyr. In 1204, Roman captured Kyiv in alliance with Poland, signed a peace treaty with the Kingdom of Hungary and established diplomatic relations with the Byzantine Empire.

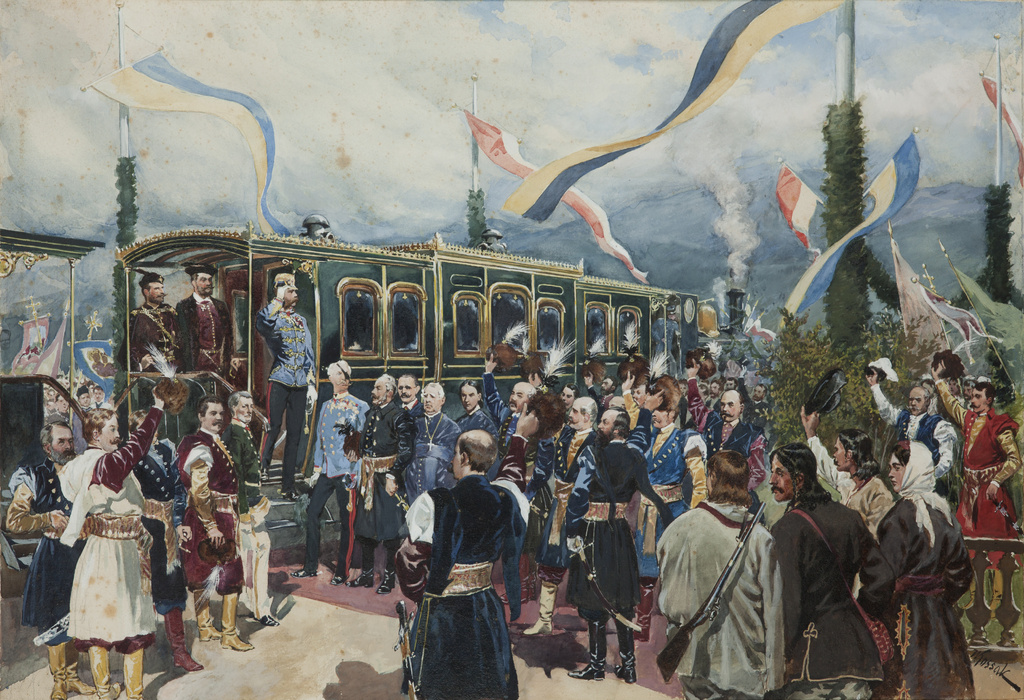
Visit of Emperor Franz Joseph I of Austria to Galicia in 1880

In 1205, Roman turned against his Polish allies, leading to a conflict with Leszek the White and Konrad of Masovia. Roman was killed in the Battle of Zawichost (1205), and Galicia–Volhynia entered a period of rebellion and chaos, becoming an arena of rivalry between Poland and Hungary. King Andrew II of Hungary styled himself rex Galiciæ et Lodomeriæ, Latin for "king of Galicia and Vladimir [in-Volhynia]", a title that later was adopted in the House of Habsburg. In a compromise agreement made in 1214 between Hungary and Poland, the throne of Galicia–Volhynia was given to Andrew's son, Coloman of Lodomeria.

In 1352, when the principality was divided between Poland and the Grand Duchy of Lithuania, the territory became subject to the Polish Crown. With the Union of Lublin in 1569, Poland and Lithuania merged to form the Polish–Lithuanian Commonwealth, which lasted for 200 years until conquered and divided up by Russia, Prussia, and Austria in the 1772 partition of the Polish–Lithuanian Commonwealth. The south-eastern part of the former Polish–Lithuanian Commonwealth was awarded to the Habsburg Empress Maria-Theresa, whose bureaucrats named it the Kingdom of Galicia and Lodomeria, after one of the titles of the princes of Hungary, although its borders coincided but roughly with those of the former medieval principality. Known informally as Galicia, it became the largest, most populous, and northernmost province of the Austrian Empire. After 1867 it was part of the Austrian half of Austria-Hungary, until the dissolution of the monarchy at the end of World War I in 1918.

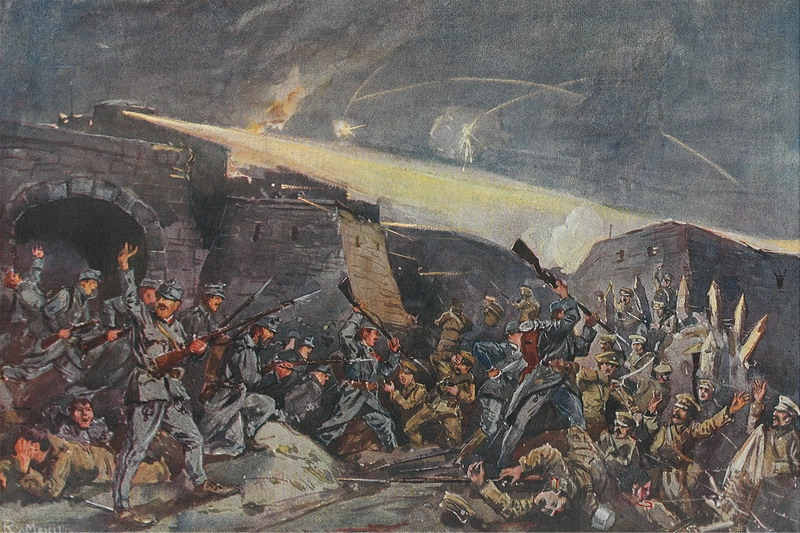
Siege of Przemyśl in 1915

During the First World War, Galicia saw heavy fighting between the forces of the Russian Empire and the Central Powers, on the Eastern Front of World War I. The Russian forces overran most of the region in 1914 after defeating the Austro-Hungarian army in a chaotic frontier battle in the opening months of the war. They were in turn pushed out in the spring and summer of 1915 by a combined German/Austro-Hungarian offensive.

In 1918, Western Galicia became a part of the restored Republic of Poland, which absorbed the Lemko-Rusyn Republic. The local Ukrainian population declared the independence of Eastern Galicia as the short-lived West Ukrainian People's Republic. During the Polish-Soviet War, the Soviets tried to establish the puppet-state of the Galician SSR in East Galicia, but the territory was then conquered by the Poles.

The 1921 Peace of Riga confirmed Galicia's status as part of the Second Polish Republic. Although never accepted as legitimate by some Ukrainian nationalists, this was ratified by the Conference of Ambassadors on 14 March 1923 and internationally recognized on 15 May 1923.

The Ukrainians of Eastern Galicia and the neighbouring province of Volhynia made up about 12% of the Polish Republic's population, and were its largest minority. As Polish government policies were discriminatory towards minorities, tensions between the Polish government and the Ukrainian population grew, eventually giving rise to the militant underground Organization of Ukrainian Nationalists. Conflicts in Galicia and Volhynia between Poles and Ukrainians intensified during the Second World War, with skirmishes between the Polish Home Army (AK), Ukrainian Insurgent Army (UPA), German Wehrmacht, and Soviet partisans. These conflicts included the massacres of Poles in Volhynia and Eastern Galicia, and within Galicia, revenge attacks on Ukrainians and Operation Vistula.

== People ==
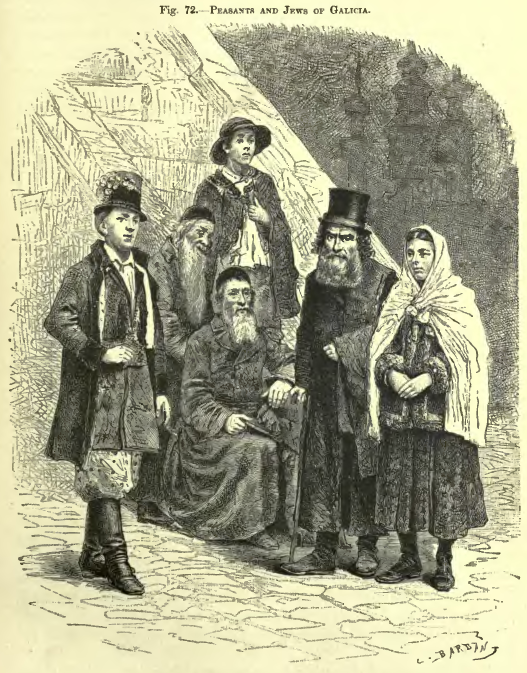
Peasants and Jews from Galicia, c. 1886

In 1773, Galicia had about 2.6 million inhabitants in 280 cities and market towns and approximately 5,500 villages. There were nearly 19,000 noble families, with 95,000 members (about 3% of the population). The serfs accounted for 1.86 million, more than 70% of the population. A small number were full-time farmers, but by far the overwhelming number (84%) had only smallholdings or no possessions.

Galicia had arguably the most ethnically diverse population of all the countries in the Austrian monarchy, consisting mainly of Poles and "Ruthenians"; the peoples known later as Ukrainians and Rusyns, as well as ethnic Jews, Germans, Armenians, Czechs, Slovaks, Hungarians, Roma and others. In Galicia as a whole, the population in 1910 was estimated to be 45.4% Polish, 42.9% Ruthenian, 10.9% Jewish, and 0.8% German. This population was not evenly distributed. The Poles lived mainly in the west, with the Ruthenians predominant in the eastern region ("Ruthenia"). At the start of the twentieth century, Poles constituted 88% of the whole population of Western Galicia and Jews 7.5%. The respective data for Eastern Galicia show the following numbers: Ruthenians 64.5%, Poles 22.0%, Jews 12%. Of the 44 administrative divisions of Austrian eastern Galicia, Lviv (Polish: Lwów, German: Lemberg) was the only one in which Poles made up a majority of the population. Anthropologist Marianna Dushar has argued that this diversity led to a development of a distinctive food culture in the region.

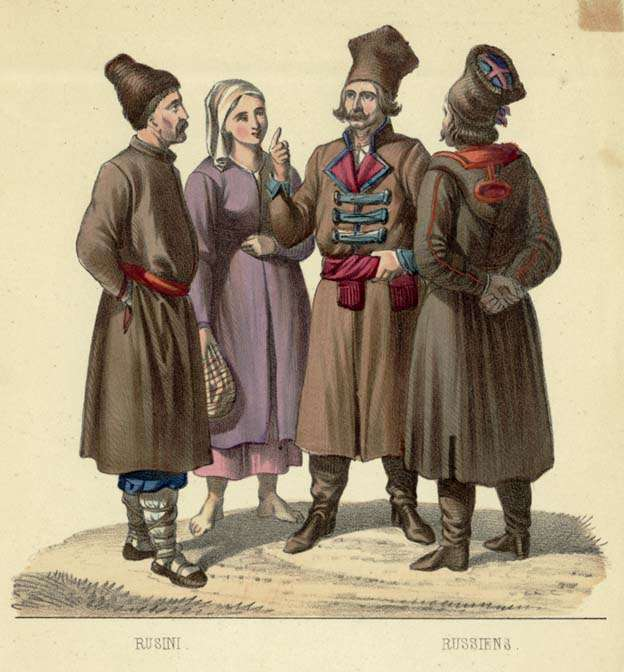
Ruthenians in Galicia in 1863

The Polish language was the most spoken language in Galicia as a whole, although the eastern part of the region was predominantly Ruthenian-speaking. According to the 1910 census, 58.6% of Galicia spoke Polish as its mother tongue, compared to 40.2% who spoke a Ruthenian language. The number of Polish-speakers may have been inflated because Jews were not given the option of listing Yiddish as their language. Eastern Galicia was the most diverse part of the region, and one of the most diverse areas in Europe at the time.

The Galician Jews immigrated in the Middle Ages from Germany. German-speaking people were more commonly referred to by the region of Germany where they originated (such as Saxony or Swabia). For those who spoke different native languages, e.g. Poles and Ruthenians, identification was less problematic, and the widespread multilingualism blurred ethnic divisions.

Religiously, Galicia is predominantly Catholic, and Catholicism is practiced in two rites. Poles are Roman Catholic, while Ukrainians belong to the Greek Catholic Church. Other Christians belong to one of the Ukrainian Orthodox Churches. Until the Holocaust, Judaism was widespread, and Galicia was the center of Hasidism.

== Economy ==
The new state borders cut Galicia off from many of its traditional trade routes and markets of the Polish sphere, resulting in stagnation of economic life and decline of Galician towns. Lviv lost its status as a significant trade center. After a short period of limited investments, the Austrian government started the fiscal exploitation of Galicia and drained the region of manpower through conscription to the imperial army. The Austrians decided that Galicia should not develop industrially but remain an agricultural area that would serve as a supplier of food products and raw materials to other Habsburg provinces. New taxes were instituted, investments were discouraged, and cities and towns were neglected. The result was significant poverty in Austrian Galicia. Galicia was the poorest province of Austro-Hungary, and according to Norman Davies, could be considered "the poorest province in Europe".

=== Oil and natural gas industry ===
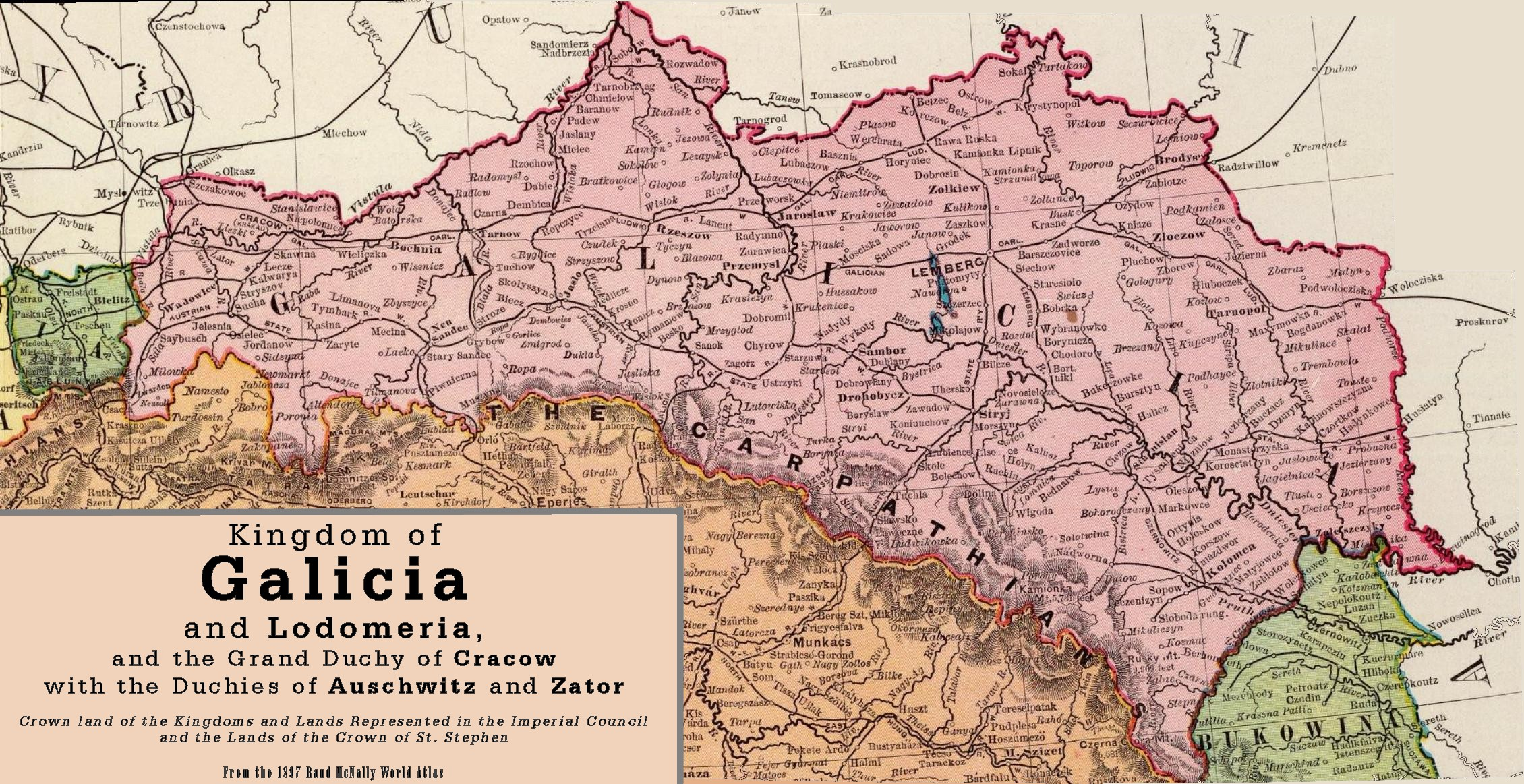
Rail lines in Galicia before 1897

Near Drohobych and Boryslav in Galicia, significant oil reserves were discovered and developed during the mid 19th and early 20th centuries. The first European attempt to drill for oil was in Bóbrka in western Galicia in 1854. By 1867, a well at Kleczany, in Western Galicia, was drilled using steam to about 200 meters. On 31 December 1872, a railway line linking Borysław (now Boryslav) with the nearby city of Drohobycz (now Drohobych) was opened. British engineer John Simeon Bergheim and Canadian William Henry McGarvey came to Galicia in 1882. (Note: William McGarvey helped develop a rig in the 1860s or 70s which made his Canadian drilling technology and Canadian drillers famous around the world. John Simon Bergheim and William Henry McGarvey had unsuccessfully searched for oil in Germany under the Continental Oil Company of which McGarvey was the director. They left Germany and began their first drilling in Galicia during 1882 under the company name of McGarvey and Bergheim.) In 1883, their company bored holes of 700 to 1,000 meters and found large oil deposits. In 1885, they renamed their oil developing enterprise the Galician-Karpathian Petroleum Company (German: Galizisch-Karpathische Petroleum Aktien-Gesellschaft), headquartered in Vienna, with McGarvey as the chief administrator and Bergheim as a field engineer, (Note: Just after the turn of the century, Bergheim was killed in a taxicab accident in London, England, leaving McGarvey to carry on alone.) and built a huge refinery at Maryampole near Gorlice, south of Tarnow. Considered the biggest, most efficient enterprise in Austro-Hungary, Maryampole was built in six months and employed 1,000 men. (Note: Later, Bergheim and McGarvey bought a number of small oil-producing and refining operations and acquired the Apollo Oil Company of Budapest.) Subsequently, investors from Britain, Belgium, and Germany established companies to develop the oil and natural gas industries in Galicia. This influx of capital caused the number of petroleum enterprises to shrink from 900 to 484 by 1884, and to 285 companies manned by 3,700 workers by 1890. However, the number of oil refineries increased from thirty-one in 1880 to fifty-four in 1904. By 1904, there were thirty boreholes in Borysław of over 1,000 meters. Production increased by 50% between 1905 and 1906 and then trebled between 1906 and 1909 because of unexpected discoveries of vast oil reserves of which many were gushers. By 1909, production reached its peak at 2,076,000 tons or 4% of worldwide production. Often called the "Polish Baku", the oil fields of Borysław and nearby Tustanowice accounted for over 90% of the national oil output of the Austro-Hungarian Empire. From 500 residents in the 1860s, Borysław had swollen to 12,000 by 1898. At the turn of the century, Galicia was ranked fourth in the world as an oil producer. (Note: In 1909, first in the world for oil production was the United States with 183,171,000 barrels, the Russian Empire was second with 65,970,000 barrels, and the Austro-Hungarian Empire was third with 14,933,000 barrels per year due to its significant oil reserves discoveries between 1905 and 1909.) This significant increase in oil production also caused a slump in oil prices. A very rapid decrease in oil production in Galicia occurred just before the Balkan Wars of 1912–1913.

Galicia was the Central Powers' only major domestic source of oil during the Great War.

== Ethnic groups ==
- Mountain Dwellers (larger kinship group): Żywczaki or Gorals of Żywiec (pl: górale żywieccy), Babiogórcy or Gorals of Babia Góra, Gorals of Rabka or Zagórzanie, Kliszczaki, Gorals in Podhale (pl: górale podhalańscy), Gorals of Nowy Targ or Nowotarżanie, Górale pienińscy or Gorals of Pieniny and Górale sądeccy (Gorals of Nowy Sącz), Gorals of Spisz or Gardłaki, Kurtacy or Czuchońcy (Lemkos, Rusnaks), Boykos (Werchowyńcy), Tucholcy, Hutsuls (Czarnogórcy).
- Dale Dwellers (larger kinship group): Krakowiacy, Mazury, Grębowiacy (Lesowiacy or Borowcy), Głuchoniemcy, Bełżanie, Bużanie (Łopotniki, Poleszuki), Opolanie, Wołyniacy, Pobereżcy or Nistrowianie.

== Linguistic and religious structure in 1910 ==
Maps of Galicia according to 1910 census

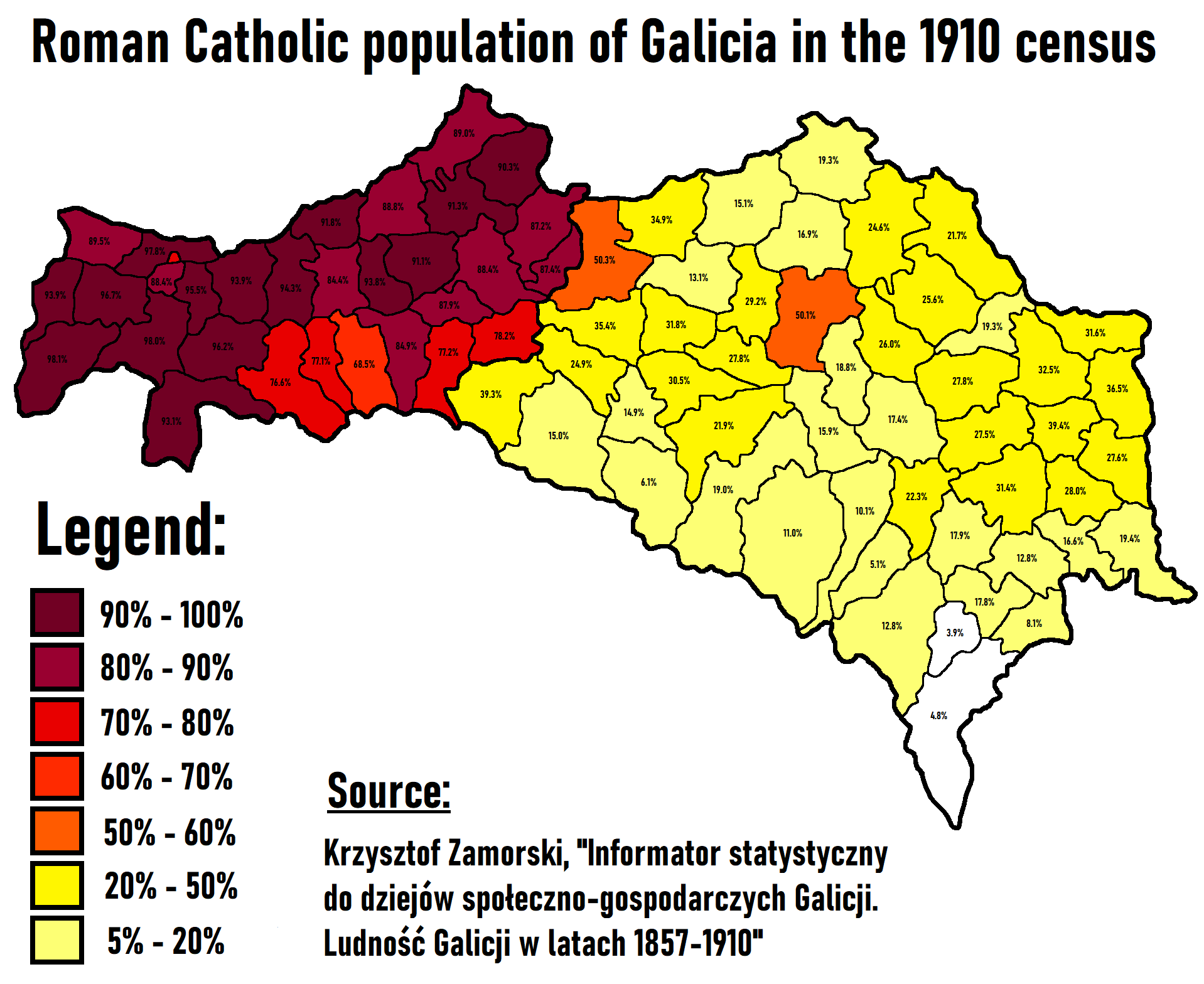
Roman Catholic population of Galicia in 1910

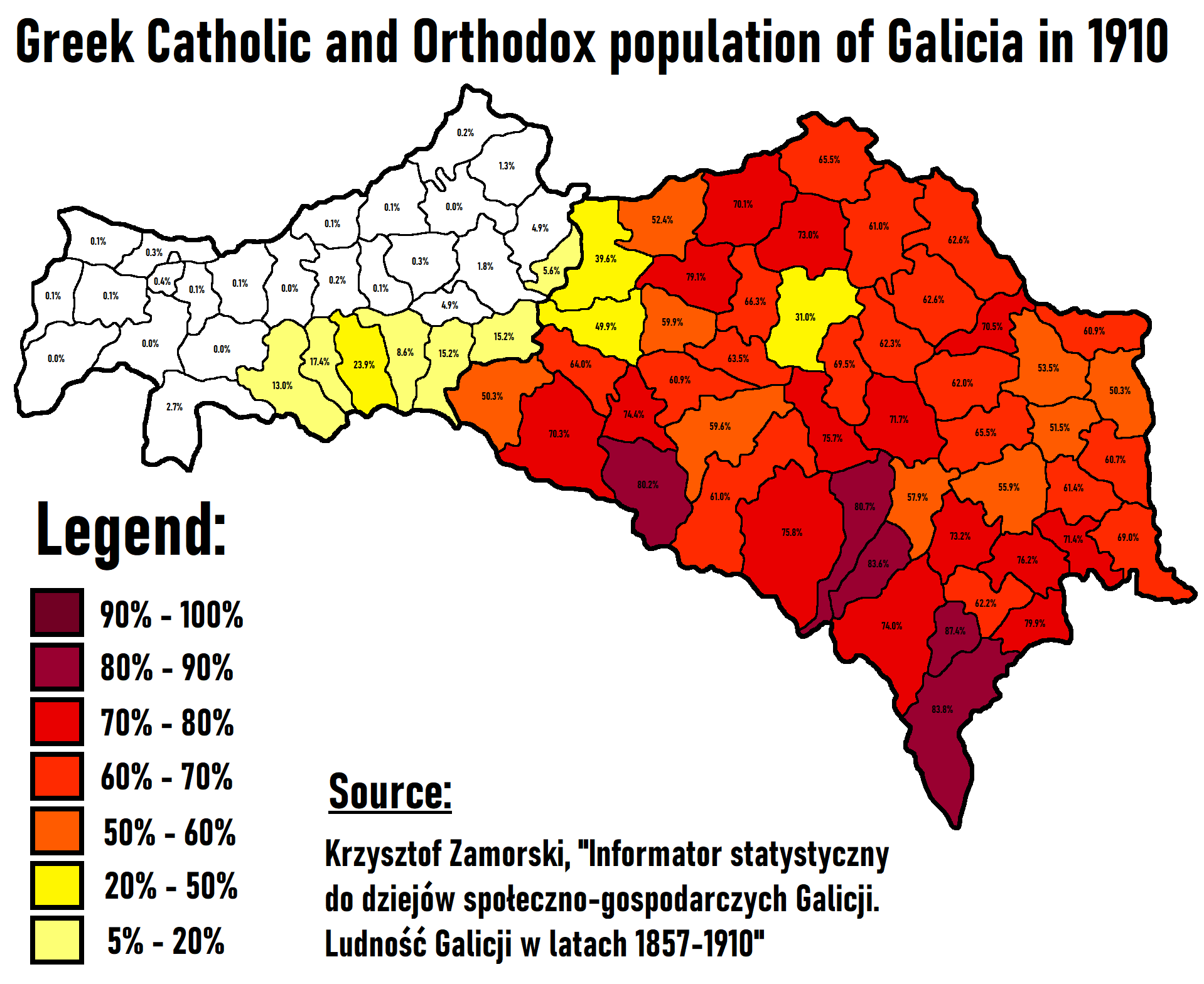
Greek Catholic and Orthodox population of Galicia in 1910

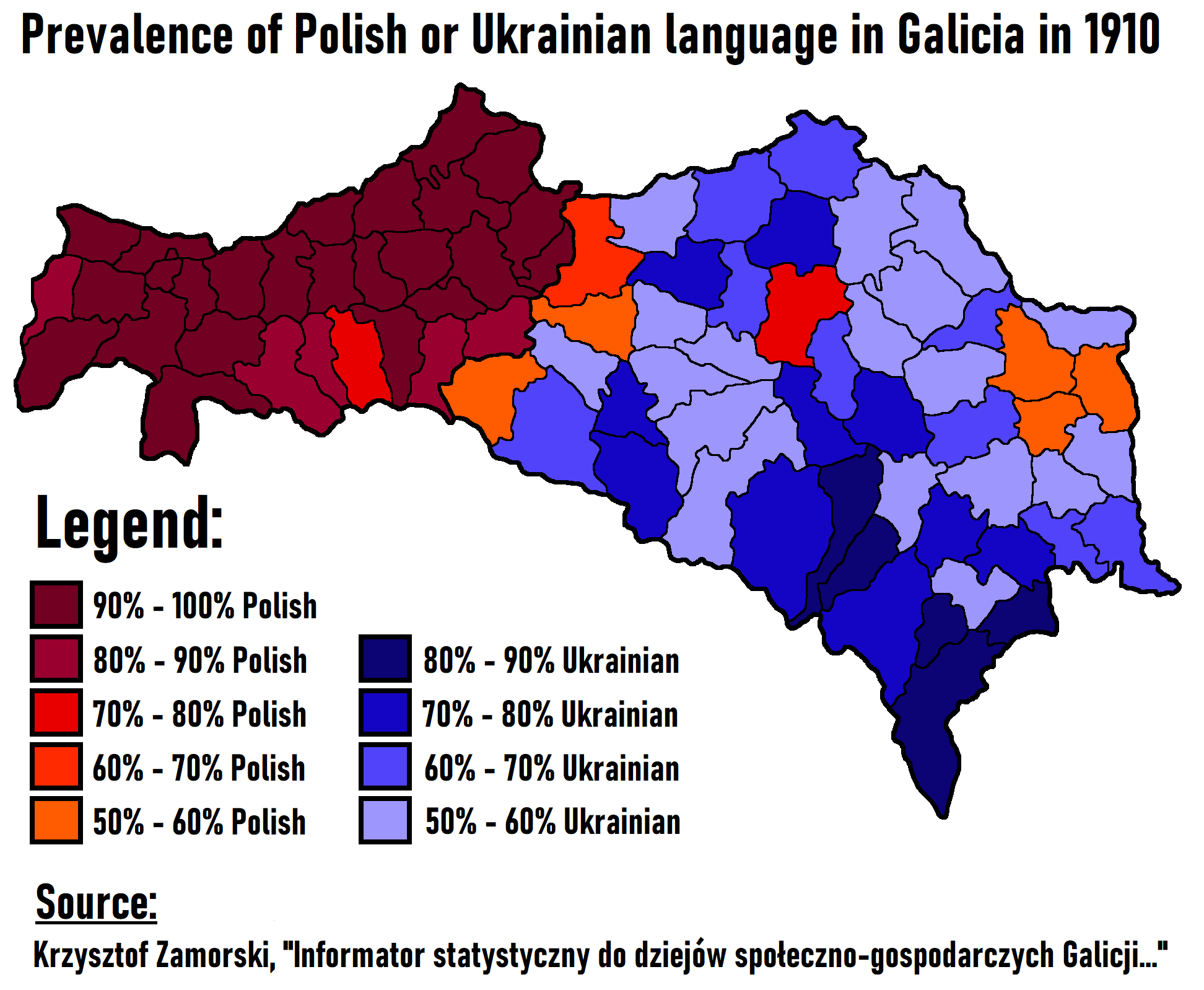
Prevalence of Polish or Ukrainian language in Galicia

Linguistic and religious structure of Galicia according to the 1910 Austrian census
Today part of	County	Pop.	Polish	Ruthenian (Ukrainian)	Other Slavic	German	Other language	Roman Catholic	Protestant	Uniate	Orthodox	Jewish	Other religion
(Poland)	Kraków City	151,886	94.4%	0.4%	1.8%	3.4%	0.0%	76.8%	0.7%	1.1%	0.0%	21.3%	0.0%
(Poland)	Biała	86,174	83.0%	0.0%	0.3%	16.7%	0.0%	93.9%	2.8%	0.1%	0.0%	3.1%	0.0%
(Poland)	Bochnia	114,401	99.8%	0.0%	0.0%	0.2%	0.0%	93.9%	0.2%	0.1%	0.0%	5.8%	0.0%
(Poland)	Brzesko	104,498	100.0%	0.0%	0.0%	0.0%	0.0%	94.3%	0.0%	0.0%	0.0%	5.6%	0.0%
(Poland)	Chrzanów	110,838	99.6%	0.0%	0.1%	0.3%	0.0%	89.5%	0.1%	0.1%	0.0%	10.3%	0.0%
(Poland)	Dąbrowa	69,119	100.0%	0.0%	0.0%	0.0%	0.0%	91.8%	0.0%	0.1%	0.0%	8.1%	0.0%
(Poland)	Gorlice	82,203	75.6%	24.2%	0.1%	0.1%	0.0%	68.5%	0.0%	23.9%	0.0%	7.5%	0.0%
(Poland)	Grybów	53,240	82.2%	17.7%	0.0%	0.0%	0.0%	77.1%	0.0%	17.4%	0.0%	5.5%	0.0%
(Poland)	Jasło	87,878	91.6%	8.4%	0.0%	0.0%	0.0%	84.9%	0.0%	8.6%	0.0%	6.5%	0.0%
(Poland)	Kolbuszowa	73,912	99.7%	0.0%	0.0%	0.3%	0.0%	91.3%	0.2%	0.0%	0.0%	8.5%	0.0%
(Poland)	Kraków County	68,829	99.2%	0.2%	0.2%	0.4%	0.0%	97.8%	0.1%	0.3%	0.0%	1.8%	0.0%
(Poland)	Krosno	83,115	84.6%	15.4%	0.0%	0.1%	0.0%	77.2%	0.0%	15.2%	0.0%	7.5%	0.0%
(Poland)	Łańcut	93,532	96.8%	3.0%	0.0%	0.1%	0.0%	87.2%	0.3%	5.0%	0.0%	7.5%	0.0%
(Poland)	Limanowa	81,163	99.9%	0.0%	0.0%	0.0%	0.0%	96.2%	0.0%	0.0%	0.0%	3.8%	0.0%
(Poland)	Mielec	77,218	98.5%	0.0%	0.0%	1.4%	0.0%	88.8%	1.1%	0.1%	0.0%	10.0%	0.0%
(Poland)	Myślenice	93,241	99.9%	0.0%	0.0%	0.1%	0.0%	98.0%	0.0%	0.0%	0.0%	2.0%	0.0%
(Poland)	Nisko	69,194	99.8%	0.0%	0.0%	0.2%	0.0%	90.3%	0.2%	1.3%	0.0%	8.2%	0.0%
(Poland)	Nowy Sącz	131,366	86.5%	12.8%	0.0%	0.7%	0.0%	76.6%	1.2%	13.0%	0.0%	9.3%	0.0%
(Poland)	Nowy Targ	80,767	99.5%	0.5%	0.0%	0.0%	0.0%	93.1%	0.1%	2.7%	0.0%	4.1%	0.0%
(Poland)	Oświęcim	49,996	99.1%	0.1%	0.3%	0.6%	0.0%	86.4%	0.2%	0.3%	0.0%	13.1%	0.0%
(Poland)	Pilzno	48,673	100.0%	0.0%	0.0%	0.0%	0.0%	93.8%	0.0%	0.1%	0.0%	6.1%	0.0%
(Poland)	Podgórze	64,383	98.2%	0.1%	1.0%	0.8%	0.0%	88.4%	0.2%	0.4%	0.0%	11.0%	0.0%
(Poland)	Przeworsk	57,044	98.4%	1.5%	0.0%	0.0%	0.0%	87.4%	0.0%	5.6%	0.0%	6.9%	0.0%
(Poland)	Ropczyce	80,170	99.6%	0.2%	0.0%	0.1%	0.0%	91.1%	0.0%	0.3%	0.0%	8.5%	0.0%
(Poland)	Rzeszów	144,271	99.1%	0.5%	0.1%	0.3%	0.0%	88.4%	0.1%	1.8%	0.0%	9.7%	0.0%
(Poland)	Strzyżów	58,549	95.5%	4.5%	0.0%	0.0%	0.0%	87.9%	0.0%	4.9%	0.0%	7.2%	0.0%
(Poland)	Tarnobrzeg	77,360	99.9%	0.1%	0.0%	0.0%	0.0%	89.0%	0.0%	0.2%	0.0%	10.7%	0.0%
(Poland)	Tarnów	114,118	99.3%	0.1%	0.2%	0.5%	0.0%	84.4%	0.1%	0.2%	0.0%	15.4%	0.0%
(Poland)	Wadowice	95,339	99.7%	0.0%	0.1%	0.2%	0.0%	96.7%	0.1%	0.1%	0.0%	3.1%	0.0%
(Poland)	Wieliczka	67,724	99.9%	0.0%	0.0%	0.1%	0.0%	95.5%	0.2%	0.1%	0.0%	4.2%	0.0%
(Poland)	Żywiec	119,653	99.5%	0.0%	0.0%	0.5%	0.0%	98.1%	0.2%	0.0%	0.0%	1.6%	0.0%
(Ukraine)	Lviv City	206,129	85.8%	10.8%	0.4%	2.9%	0.1%	51.2%	1.5%	19.2%	0.3%	27.8%	0.1%
(Ukraine)	Bibrka	88,527	30.1%	69.1%	0.0%	0.8%	0.0%	18.8%	0.2%	69.5%	0.0%	11.5%	0.0%
(Ukraine)	Bohorodchany	69,463	13.7%	84.9%	0.1%	1.3%	0.0%	5.1%	0.6%	83.6%	0.0%	10.8%	0.0%
(Ukraine)	Borshchiv	109,320	31.0%	68.6%	0.0%	0.4%	0.0%	19.4%	0.0%	68.9%	0.0%	11.7%	0.0%
(Ukraine)	Brody	146,216	37.8%	59.6%	0.0%	2.5%	0.2%	21.7%	0.2%	62.4%	0.3%	15.5%	0.0%
(Ukraine)	Berezhany	104,810	40.9%	58.9%	0.0%	0.1%	0.0%	27.8%	0.0%	62.0%	0.0%	10.3%	0.0%
(Poland)	Brzozów	81,409	87.9%	12.1%	0.0%	0.0%	0.0%	78.2%	0.0%	15.2%	0.0%	6.5%	0.0%
(Ukraine)	Buchach	138,297	46.6%	53.0%	0.0%	0.4%	0.0%	31.4%	0.0%	55.9%	0.0%	12.6%	0.0%
(Poland)	Cieszanów	86,549	48.1%	51.4%	0.0%	0.5%	0.0%	34.9%	0.2%	52.4%	0.0%	12.5%	0.0%
(Ukraine)	Chortkiv	76,447	39.1%	59.7%	0.2%	1.0%	0.0%	28.0%	0.2%	61.3%	0.0%	10.4%	0.0%
(Ukraine)	Dobromyl	72,103	39.2%	59.7%	0.0%	1.1%	0.0%	24.9%	0.7%	64.0%	0.0%	10.5%	0.0%
(Ukraine)	Dolyna	113,831	21.4%	74.9%	0.0%	3.7%	0.0%	10.8%	2.1%	75.8%	0.0%	11.3%	0.0%
(Ukraine)	Drohobych	171,687	41.3%	56.7%	0.0%	2.0%	0.0%	21.9%	1.3%	59.6%	0.0%	17.2%	0.0%
(Ukraine)	Horodok	79,612	35.0%	62.7%	0.0%	2.3%	0.0%	29.2%	2.2%	58.7%	0.0%	9.9%	0.0%
(Ukraine)	Horodenka	92,033	26.9%	72.9%	0.1%	0.1%	0.0%	12.8%	0.0%	76.2%	0.1%	11.0%	0.0%
(Ukraine)	Husiatyn	96,891	44.2%	55.7%	0.0%	0.1%	0.0%	27.6%	0.0%	60.7%	0.0%	11.6%	0.0%
(Poland)	Jarosław	150,301	66.7%	32.0%	0.6%	0.6%	0.0%	50.3%	0.1%	39.6%	0.0%	10.0%	0.0%
(Ukraine)	Yavoriv	86,720	20.6%	78.3%	0.0%	1.1%	0.0%	13.1%	0.5%	79.0%	0.1%	7.3%	0.0%
(Ukraine)	Kalush	97,421	17.1%	81.2%	0.0%	1.6%	0.0%	10.1%	0.8%	80.7%	0.0%	8.4%	0.0%
(Ukraine)	Kamianka-Buzka	115,316	39.7%	58.4%	0.0%	1.7%	0.2%	24.6%	1.6%	60.7%	0.3%	12.7%	0.0%
(Ukraine)	Kolomyia	124,850	38.1%	59.2%	0.2%	2.4%	0.0%	17.8%	0.9%	62.0%	0.2%	19.1%	0.0%
(Ukraine)	Kosiv	85,805	15.1%	84.1%	0.0%	0.8%	0.0%	4.8%	0.0%	83.8%	0.0%	11.3%	0.0%
(Poland)	Lesko	98,492	30.2%	68.9%	0.0%	0.9%	0.0%	15.0%	0.6%	70.3%	0.0%	14.1%	0.0%
(Ukraine)	Lviv County	161,580	61.6%	36.6%	0.0%	1.8%	0.0%	43.4%	2.1%	45.8%	0.0%	8.7%	0.0%
(Ukraine)	Mostyska	87,841	43.8%	56.1%	0.0%	0.1%	0.0%	31.8%	0.1%	59.9%	0.0%	8.2%	0.0%
(Ukraine)	Nadvírna	90,663	25.4%	73.4%	0.0%	1.1%	0.0%	12.8%	0.6%	74.0%	0.0%	12.6%	0.0%
(Ukraine)	Pechenizhyn	46,794	12.1%	87.8%	0.0%	0.1%	0.0%	3.6%	0.0%	87.4%	0.0%	9.0%	0.0%
(Ukraine)	Pidhaitsi	93,546	33.4%	65.9%	0.0%	0.7%	0.0%	26.7%	0.0%	65.5%	0.0%	7.8%	0.0%
(Poland)	Przemyśl	159,991	52.4%	44.9%	0.4%	2.2%	0.0%	35.4%	0.4%	49.9%	0.1%	14.1%	0.1%
(Ukraine)	Peremyshliany	86,568	39.5%	59.5%	0.0%	1.0%	0.0%	26.0%	0.7%	62.3%	0.0%	11.0%	0.0%
(Ukraine)	Rava-Ruska	115,333	32.0%	67.0%	0.0%	1.0%	0.0%	15.0%	0.4%	70.1%	0.0%	14.5%	0.1%
(Ukraine)	Rohatyn	124,966	29.2%	70.6%	0.0%	0.2%	0.0%	17.4%	0.1%	71.7%	0.0%	10.8%	0.0%
(Ukraine)	Rudky	77,269	39.1%	60.5%	0.0%	0.4%	0.0%	27.8%	0.4%	63.5%	0.0%	8.3%	0.0%
(Ukraine)	Sambir	107,445	41.7%	57.1%	0.0%	1.2%	0.0%	30.5%	0.3%	60.9%	0.0%	8.2%	0.0%
(Poland)	Sanok	108,678	54.4%	45.4%	0.0%	0.2%	0.0%	39.3%	0.0%	50.3%	0.0%	10.4%	0.0%
(Ukraine)	Skalat	96,006	52.0%	47.7%	0.0%	0.3%	0.0%	36.5%	0.0%	50.3%	0.0%	13.1%	0.0%
(Ukraine)	Skole	55,353	18.1%	77.8%	0.0%	4.1%	0.0%	10.9%	1.0%	77.4%	0.0%	10.7%	0.0%
(Ukraine)	Sniatyn	88,706	17.3%	80.5%	0.0%	2.1%	0.0%	8.1%	0.5%	79.7%	0.1%	11.5%	0.0%
(Ukraine)	Sokal	109,250	39.7%	60.2%	0.0%	0.1%	0.0%	19.3%	0.2%	65.5%	0.0%	14.9%	0.0%
(Ukraine)	Stanyslaviv	158,066	39.6%	57.5%	0.3%	2.5%	0.1%	22.3%	0.9%	57.6%	0.2%	18.8%	0.1%
(Ukraine)	Staryi Sambir	60,810	27.4%	72.4%	0.0%	0.1%	0.0%	14.9%	0.0%	74.4%	0.0%	10.7%	0.0%
(Ukraine)	Stryi	80,211	37.6%	58.3%	0.1%	4.0%	0.0%	19.0%	4.0%	61.0%	0.0%	15.9%	0.0%
(Ukraine)	Ternopil	142,138	51.4%	48.0%	0.1%	0.4%	0.0%	32.5%	0.1%	53.5%	0.0%	13.9%	0.0%
(Ukraine)	Tlumach	116,066	27.4%	71.8%	0.0%	0.8%	0.0%	17.9%	0.7%	73.2%	0.0%	8.3%	0.0%
(Ukraine)	Terebovlia	81,048	51.7%	48.0%	0.2%	0.1%	0.0%	39.4%	0.1%	51.5%	0.0%	9.0%	0.0%
(Ukraine)	Turka	85,823	19.9%	79.8%	0.1%	0.3%	0.0%	6.1%	0.1%	80.2%	0.0%	13.6%	0.0%
(Ukraine)	Zalishchyky	76,957	30.3%	69.2%	0.1%	0.4%	0.0%	16.6%	0.0%	71.3%	0.1%	12.0%	0.0%
(Ukraine)	Zbarazh	71,498	43.0%	57.0%	0.0%	0.0%	0.0%	31.6%	0.0%	60.9%	0.0%	7.5%	0.0%
(Ukraine)	Zboriv	60,665	32.0%	67.9%	0.0%	0.1%	0.0%	19.3%	0.0%	70.5%	0.0%	10.2%	0.0%
(Ukraine)	Zolochiv	117,372	40.3%	59.1%	0.1%	0.6%	0.0%	25.6%	0.3%	62.6%	0.0%	11.6%	0.0%
(Ukraine)	Zhovkva	99,658	25.9%	72.3%	0.0%	1.7%	0.0%	16.9%	0.5%	73.0%	0.0%	9.6%	0.0%
(Ukraine)	Zhydachiv	83,339	22.4%	74.7%	0.0%	2.9%	0.0%	15.9%	0.2%	75.7%	0.0%	8.2%	0.0%
Galicia		8,025,817											

== Linguistic and religious structure in 1931 ==
Maps of Galicia according to 1931 census

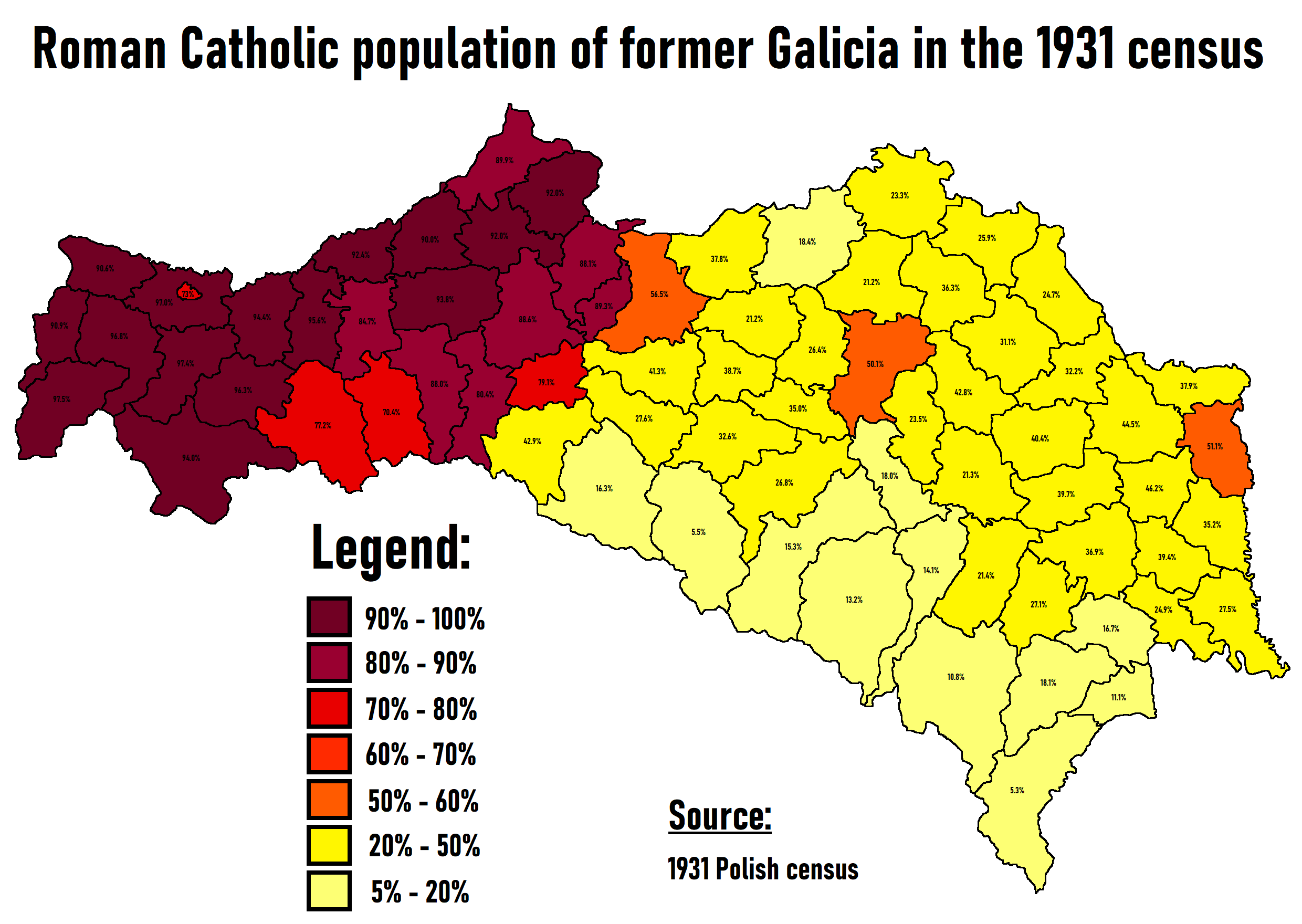
Roman Catholic population in Galicia (1931)

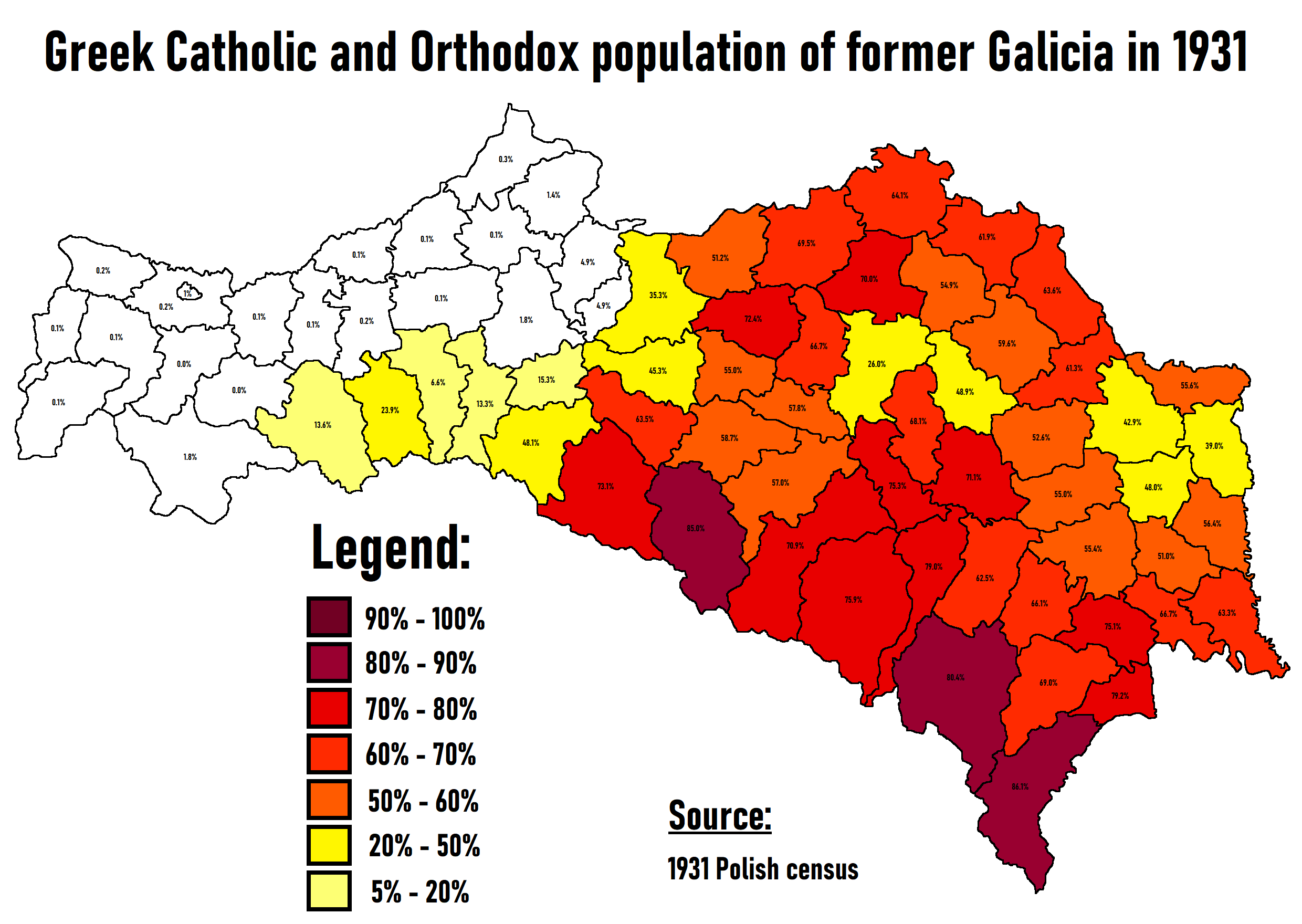
Greek Catholic and Orthodox population

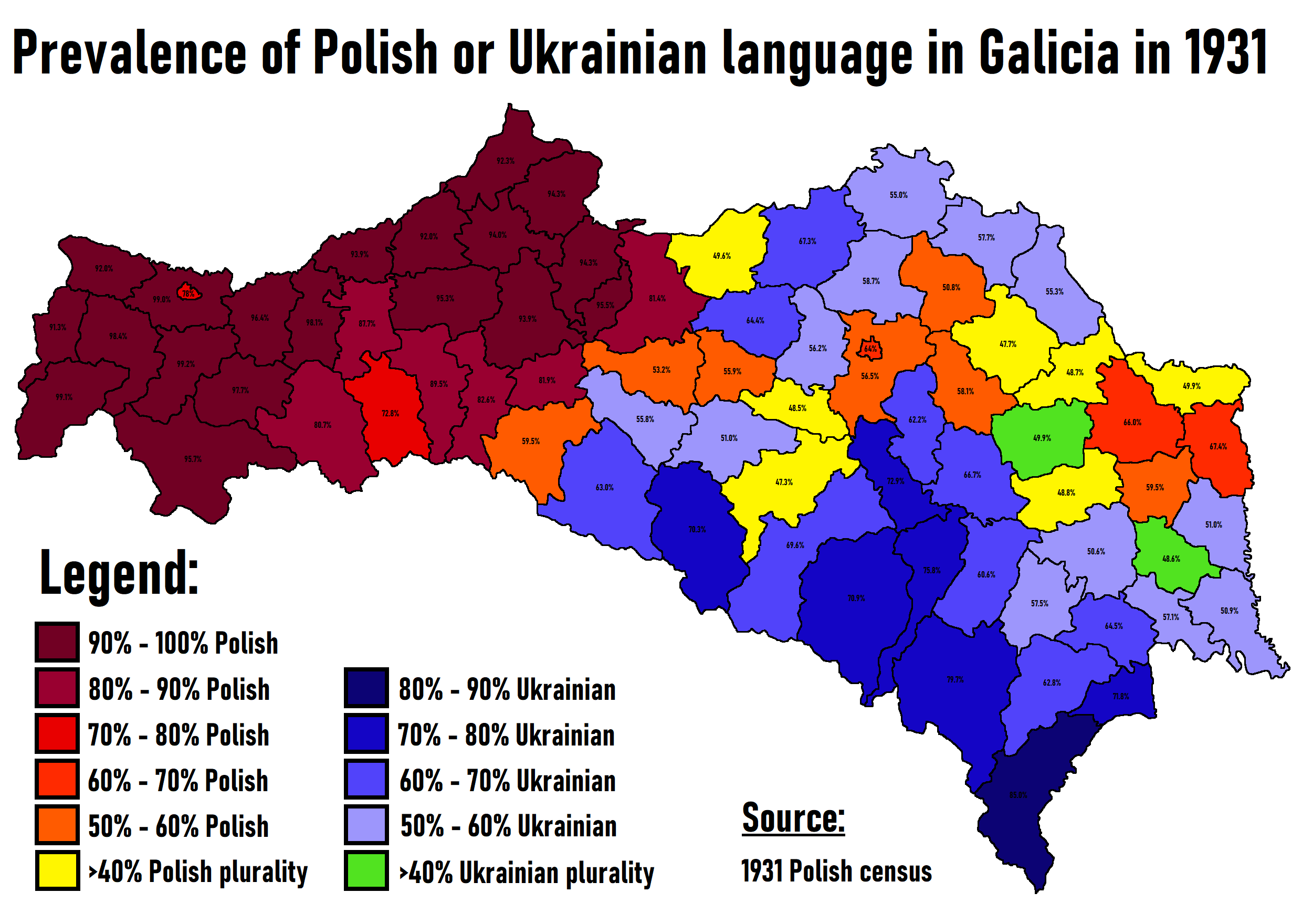
Prevalence of Polish or Ukrainian language

Demographics of Galicia by religious affiliation and language, according to the 1931 Polish census
Today part of	County	Pop.	Polish	%	Yiddish & Hebrew	%	Ukrainian & Ruthenian	%	Other language % (Note: Includes 40,393 German-speakers or around 0.5% of inhabitants of former Galicia.)	Roman Catholic	%	Jewish	%	Uniate & Orthodox	%	Other religion %
(Ukraine)	Borshchiv	103,277	46,153	44.7%	4,302	4.2%	52,612	50.9%	0.2%	28,432	27.5%	9,353	9.1%	65,344	63.3%	0.1%
(Ukraine)	Brody	91,248	32,843	36.0%	7,640	8.4%	50,490	55.3%	0.3%	22,521	24.7%	10,360	11.4%	58,009	63.6%	0.4%
(Ukraine)	Berezhany	103,824	48,168	46.4%	3,716	3.6%	51,757	49.9%	0.2%	41,962	40.4%	7,151	6.9%	54,611	52.6%	0.1%
(Ukraine)	Buchach	139,062	60,523	43.5%	8,059	5.8%	70,336	50.6%	0.1%	51,311	36.9%	10,568	7.6%	77,023	55.4%	0.1%
(Ukraine)	Chortkiv	84,008	36,486	43.4%	6,474	7.7%	40,866	48.6%	0.2%	33,080	39.4%	7,845	9.3%	42,828	51.0%	0.3%
(Ukraine)	Kamianka-Buzka	82,111	41,693	50.8%	4,737	5.8%	35,178	42.8%	0.6%	29,828	36.3%	6,700	8.2%	45,113	54.9%	0.6%
(Ukraine)	Kopychyntsi	88,614	38,158	43.1%	5,164	5.8%	45,196	51.0%	0.1%	31,202	35.2%	7,291	8.2%	50,007	56.4%	0.1%
(Ukraine)	Pidhaitsi	95,663	46,710	48.8%	3,464	3.6%	45,031	47.1%	0.5%	38,003	39.7%	4,786	5.0%	52,634	55.0%	0.3%
(Ukraine)	Peremyshliany	89,908	52,269	58.1%	4,445	4.9%	32,777	36.5%	0.5%	38,475	42.8%	6,860	7.6%	44,002	48.9%	0.6%
(Ukraine)	Radekhiv	69,313	25,427	36.7%	3,277	4.7%	39,970	57.7%	0.9%	17,945	25.9%	6,934	10.0%	42,928	61.9%	2.2%
(Ukraine)	Skalat	89,215	60,091	67.4%	3,654	4.1%	25,369	28.4%	0.1%	45,631	51.1%	8,486	9.5%	34,798	39.0%	0.3%
(Ukraine)	Ternopil	142,220	93,874	66.0%	5,836	4.1%	42,374	29.8%	0.1%	63,286	44.5%	17,684	12.4%	60,979	42.9%	0.2%
(Ukraine)	Terebovlia	84,321	50,178	59.5%	3,173	3.8%	30,868	36.6%	0.1%	38,979	46.2%	4,845	5.7%	40,452	48.0%	0.1%
(Ukraine)	Zalishchyky	72,021	27,549	38.3%	3,261	4.5%	41,147	57.1%	0.1%	17,917	24.9%	5,965	8.3%	48,069	66.7%	0.1%
(Ukraine)	Zbarazh	65,579	32,740	49.9%	3,142	4.8%	29,609	45.2%	0.1%	24,855	37.9%	3,997	6.1%	36,468	55.6%	0.4%
(Ukraine)	Zboriv	81,413	39,624	48.7%	2,522	3.1%	39,174	48.1%	0.1%	26,239	32.2%	5,056	6.2%	49,925	61.3%	0.2%
(Ukraine)	Zolochiv	118,609	56,628	47.7%	6,066	5.1%	55,381	46.7%	0.5%	36,937	31.1%	10,236	8.6%	70,663	59.6%	0.7%
(Ukraine)	Dolyna	118,373	21,158	17.9%	9,031	7.6%	83,880	70.9%	3.6%	15,630	13.2%	10,471	8.8%	89,811	75.9%	2.1%
(Ukraine)	Horodenka	92,894	27,751	29.9%	5,031	5.4%	59,957	64.5%	0.2%	15,519	16.7%	7,480	8.1%	69,789	75.1%	0.1%
(Ukraine)	Kalush	102,252	18,637	18.2%	5,109	5.0%	77,506	75.8%	1.0%	14,418	14.1%	6,249	6.1%	80,750	79.0%	0.8%
(Ukraine)	Kolomyia	176,000	52,006	29.5%	11,191	6.4%	110,533	62.8%	1.3%	31,925	18.1%	20,887	11.9%	121,376	69.0%	1.0%
(Ukraine)	Kosiv	93,952	6,718	7.2%	6,730	7.2%	79,838	85.0%	0.7%	4,976	5.3%	7,826	8.3%	80,903	86.1%	0.3%
(Ukraine)	Nadvírna	140,702	16,907	12.0%	11,020	7.8%	112,128	79.7%	0.5%	15,214	10.8%	11,663	8.3%	113,116	80.4%	0.5%
(Ukraine)	Rohatyn	127,252	36,152	28.4%	6,111	4.8%	84,875	66.7%	0.1%	27,108	21.3%	9,466	7.4%	90,456	71.1%	0.2%
(Ukraine)	Stanyslaviv	198,359	49,032	24.7%	26,996	13.6%	120,214	60.6%	1.1%	42,519	21.4%	29,525	14.9%	123,959	62.5%	1.2%
(Ukraine)	Stryi	152,631	25,186	16.5%	15,413	10.1%	106,183	69.6%	3.8%	23,404	15.3%	17,115	11.2%	108,159	70.9%	2.6%
(Ukraine)	Sniatyn	78,025	17,206	22.1%	4,341	5.6%	56,007	71.8%	0.6%	8,659	11.1%	7,073	9.1%	61,797	79.2%	0.6%
(Ukraine)	Tlumach	116,028	44,958	38.7%	3,677	3.2%	66,659	57.5%	0.6%	31,478	27.1%	6,702	5.8%	76,650	66.1%	1.0%
(Ukraine)	Zhydachiv	83,817	16,464	19.6%	4,728	5.6%	61,098	72.9%	1.8%	15,094	18.0%	5,289	6.3%	63,144	75.3%	0.3%
(Ukraine)	Bibrka	97,124	30,762	31.7%	5,533	5.7%	60,444	62.2%	0.4%	22,820	23.5%	7,972	8.2%	66,113	68.1%	0.2%
(Ukraine)	Dobromyl	93,970	35,945	38.3%	4,997	5.3%	52,463	55.8%	0.6%	25,941	27.6%	7,522	8.0%	59,664	63.5%	0.9%
(Ukraine)	Drohobych	194,456	91,935	47.3%	20,484	10.5%	79,214	40.7%	1.5%	52,172	26.8%	28,888	14.9%	110,850	57.0%	1.3%
(Ukraine)	Horodok	85,007	33,228	39.1%	2,975	3.5%	47,812	56.2%	1.2%	22,408	26.4%	4,982	5.9%	56,713	66.7%	1.1%
(Ukraine)	Yavoriv	86,762	26,938	31.0%	3,044	3.5%	55,868	64.4%	1.1%	18,394	21.2%	5,161	5.9%	62,828	72.4%	0.4%
(Ukraine)	Lviv City	312,231	198,212	63.5%	75,316	24.1%	35,137	11.3%	1.1%	157,490	50.4%	99,595	31.9%	50,824	16.3%	1.4%
(Ukraine)	Lviv County	142,800	80,712	56.5%	1,569	1.1%	58,395	40.9%	1.5%	67,430	47.2%	5,087	3.6%	67,592	47.3%	1.9%
(Ukraine)	Mostyska	89,460	49,989	55.9%	2,164	2.4%	37,196	41.6%	0.1%	34,619	38.7%	5,428	6.1%	49,230	55.0%	0.2%
(Ukraine)	Rava-Ruska	122,072	27,376	22.4%	10,991	9.0%	82,133	67.3%	1.3%	22,489	18.4%	13,381	11.0%	84,808	69.5%	1.1%
(Ukraine)	Rudky	79,170	38,417	48.5%	4,247	5.4%	36,254	45.8%	0.3%	27,674	35.0%	5,396	6.8%	45,756	57.8%	0.4%
(Ukraine)	Sambir	133,814	56,818	42.5%	7,794	5.8%	68,222	51.0%	0.7%	43,583	32.6%	11,258	8.4%	78,527	58.7%	0.3%
(Ukraine)	Sokal	109,111	42,851	39.3%	5,917	5.4%	59,984	55.0%	0.3%	25,425	23.3%	13,372	12.3%	69,963	64.1%	0.3%
(Ukraine)	Turka	114,457	26,083	22.8%	7,552	6.6%	80,483	70.3%	0.3%	6,301	5.5%	10,627	9.3%	97,339	85.0%	0.2%
(Ukraine)	Zhovkva	95,507	35,816	37.5%	3,344	3.5%	56,060	58.7%	0.3%	20,279	21.2%	7,848	8.2%	66,823	70.0%	0.6%
(Poland)	Brzozów	83,205	68,149	81.9%	3,836	4.6%	10,677	12.8%	0.7%	65,813	79.1%	4,316	5.2%	12,743	15.3%	0.4%
(Poland)	Jarosław	148,028	120,429	81.4%	6,064	4.1%	20,993	14.2%	0.4%	83,652	56.5%	11,721	7.9%	52,302	35.3%	0.2%
(Poland)	Kolbuszowa	69,565	65,361	94.0%	3,693	5.3%	62	0.1%	0.6%	63,999	92.0%	5,091	7.3%	91	0.1%	0.6%
(Poland)	Krosno	113,387	93,691	82.6%	4,416	3.9%	14,666	12.9%	0.5%	91,189	80.4%	6,521	5.8%	15,132	13.3%	0.5%
(Poland)	Lesko	111,575	31,840	28.5%	8,475	7.6%	70,346	63.0%	0.8%	18,209	16.3%	10,916	9.8%	81,588	73.1%	0.8%
(Poland)	Lubaczów	87,266	43,294	49.6%	5,485	6.3%	38,237	43.8%	0.3%	32,994	37.8%	9,342	10.7%	44,723	51.2%	0.2%
(Poland)	Łańcut	97,679	92,084	94.3%	2,318	2.4%	2,690	2.8%	0.6%	86,066	88.1%	6,281	6.4%	4,806	4.9%	0.5%
(Poland)	Nisko	64,233	60,602	94.3%	3,084	4.8%	115	0.2%	0.7%	59,069	92.0%	3,985	6.2%	925	1.4%	0.4%
(Poland)	Przemyśl	162,544	86,393	53.2%	15,891	9.8%	60,005	36.9%	0.2%	67,068	41.3%	21,424	13.2%	73,631	45.3%	0.3%
(Poland)	Przeworsk	61,388	58,634	95.5%	2,144	3.5%	406	0.7%	0.3%	54,833	89.3%	3,405	5.5%	3,042	5.0%	0.2%
(Poland)	Rzeszów	185,106	173,897	93.9%	9,065	4.9%	963	0.5%	0.6%	164,050	88.6%	17,098	9.2%	3,277	1.8%	0.4%
(Poland)	Sanok	114,195	67,955	59.5%	7,354	6.4%	38,192	33.4%	0.6%	48,968	42.9%	9,455	8.3%	54,882	48.1%	0.8%
(Poland)	Tarnobrzeg	73,297	67,624	92.3%	5,186	7.1%	93	0.1%	0.5%	65,891	89.9%	6,333	8.6%	194	0.3%	1.2%
(Poland)	Biała	139,127	127,089	91.3%	5,932	4.3%	48	0.0%	4.4%	126,431	90.9%	9,951	7.2%	197	0.1%	1.8%
(Poland)	Bochnia	113,790	109,717	96.4%	3,847	3.4%	75	0.1%	0.1%	107,399	94.4%	5,656	5.0%	134	0.1%	0.5%
(Poland)	Brzesko	102,226	100,251	98.1%	1,894	1.9%	20	0.0%	0.1%	97,730	95.6%	4,121	4.0%	66	0.1%	0.3%
(Poland)	Chrzanów	138,061	127,078	92.0%	10,435	7.6%	88	0.1%	0.3%	125,016	90.6%	12,127	8.8%	240	0.2%	0.5%
(Poland)	Dąbrowa	66,678	62,620	93.9%	4,016	6.0%	25	0.0%	0.0%	61,584	92.4%	4,807	7.2%	36	0.1%	0.4%
(Poland)	Gorlice	104,805	76,266	72.8%	3,508	3.3%	24,881	23.7%	0.1%	73,788	70.4%	5,578	5.3%	25,092	23.9%	0.3%
(Poland)	Jasło	116,146	103,935	89.5%	4,608	4.0%	7,435	6.4%	0.1%	102,213	88.0%	5,786	5.0%	7,659	6.6%	0.4%
(Poland)	Kraków City	219,286	171,206	78.1%	45,828	20.9%	924	0.4%	0.6%	159,372	72.7%	56,515	25.8%	1,894	0.9%	0.7%
(Poland)	Kraków County	187,509	185,567	99.0%	1,569	0.8%	97	0.1%	0.1%	181,836	97.0%	4,138	2.2%	309	0.2%	0.7%
(Poland)	Limanowa	87,279	85,238	97.7%	1,951	2.2%	29	0.0%	0.1%	84,048	96.3%	2,766	3.2%	43	0.0%	0.5%
(Poland)	Mielec	77,465	71,272	92.0%	5,441	7.0%	48	0.1%	0.9%	69,737	90.0%	6,457	8.3%	72	0.1%	1.5%
(Poland)	Myślenice	102,692	101,878	99.2%	770	0.7%	16	0.0%	0.0%	99,978	97.4%	2,189	2.1%	32	0.0%	0.5%
(Poland)	Nowy Sącz	183,867	148,329	80.7%	10,282	5.6%	24,252	13.2%	0.5%	141,857	77.2%	15,135	8.2%	25,060	13.6%	1.0%
(Poland)	Nowy Targ	129,489	123,877	95.7%	2,571	2.0%	2,156	1.7%	0.7%	121,767	94.0%	4,853	3.7%	2,296	1.8%	0.4%
(Poland)	Ropczyce	110,925	105,700	95.3%	5,101	4.6%	60	0.1%	0.1%	104,033	93.8%	6,410	5.8%	136	0.1%	0.3%
(Poland)	Tarnów	142,365	124,817	87.7%	17,307	12.2%	102	0.1%	0.1%	120,610	84.7%	21,219	14.9%	293	0.2%	0.2%
(Poland)	Wadowice	145,143	142,852	98.4%	2,070	1.4%	53	0.0%	0.1%	140,469	96.8%	3,665	2.5%	125	0.1%	0.6%
(Poland)	Żywiec	130,949	129,747	99.1%	915	0.7%	19	0.0%	0.2%	127,685	97.5%	2,245	1.7%	71	0.1%	0.7%
Total former Galicia		8,505,902	5,023,763	59.1%	549,293	6.5%	2,874,451	33.8%	0.7%	4,326,926	50.9%	789,886	9.3%	3,331,884	39.2%	0.7%

== See also ==
- Kingdom of Galicia and Lodomeria
- Subdivisions of Galicia
- Bukovina
- Podolia
- West Ukrainian People's Republic
- Galician Soviet Socialist Republic
- History of the Jews in Galicia (Eastern Europe)
- District of Galicia
- Lesser Poland
- List of rulers of Halych and Volhynia
- List of Galician rulers
- List of towns of the former Kingdom of Galicia and Lodomeria
- Massacres of Poles in Volhynia and Eastern Galicia
- Distrikt Galizien
- Galatia
- Galician Russophilia
