= List of towns of the former Kingdom of Galicia and Lodomeria =

This is a list of major cities and towns which belonged to the Kingdom of Galicia and Lodomeria from the Congress of Vienna in 1815 until the dissolution of Austria-Hungary in 1918. Between those dates, the Kingdom of Galicia and Lodomeria consisted mostly of the territories gained by the Habsburg Empire in the First Partition of Poland in 1772.

Today, the territory of Galicia is split between Poland in the west and Ukraine in the east. At the turn of the Twentieth Century, Poles constituted 88.7% of the whole population of Western Galicia, Jews 7.6%, Ukrainians 3.2%, Germans 0.3%, and others 0.2%. Respective data for Eastern Galicia show the following number: Ukrainians 60.5%, Poles 25.0%, Jews 13.7%, Germans 0.3%, and others 0.5%. Before World War II, many Galician towns, even in the predominantly ethnic Ukrainian east, had substantial Polish, Jewish and German populations.

In 1931, 93% Poles, 5% Jews, 2% others (mainly Ukrainians and Germans) lived in Western Galicia. While 52% Ukrainians, 35% Poles, 10% Jews, 3% others (mainly Germans and Armenians) lived in Eastern Galicia.

== Ukraine ==
Ukrainian (transcription)	Ukrainian (Cyrillic)	Polish	German	Yiddish (transliteration)
Belz	Белз	Bełz	Bels	בעלז (Beltz)
Berezhany	Бережани	Brzeżany	Breschan	ברעזשאן (Brezhan)
Bolekhiv	Болехів	Bolechów	Bolechau	בולחוב
Boryslav	Борислав	Borysław	Borislau	
Brody	Броди	Brody	Brody	בראד (Brod)
Busk	Буськ	Busk	Bussk	בוסק (Bisk)
Buchach	Бучач	Buczacz	Butschatsch	בוטשאטש (Bitshutsh)
Chortkiv	Чортків	Czortków	Tschortkau	טשארטקאוו (Tshortkov)
Drohobych	Дрогобич	Drohobycz	Drohobitsch	דראהביטש (Drubitsh)
Halych	Галич	Halicz	Halitsch	גאליצ (Galits)
Horodenka	Городенка	Horodenka		הורדנקא
Horodok	Городок	Gródek	Grodeck	
Husiatyn	Гусятин	Husiatyń		הוסיאטין (Hushatin)
Ivano-Frankivsk (Stanyslaviv)	Івано-Франківськ (Станиславів)	Iwano-Frankowsk (Stanisławów)	Iwano-Frankiwsk (Stanislau)	סטאניסלאוו (Stanislav)
Kalush	Калуш	Kałusz	Kallusch	קאליזש
Kolomyia	Коломия	Kołomyja	Kolomea	קאלאמײַ (Kolomay)
Kozova	Козова	Kozowa	קאזאווע	
Lviv	Львів	Lwów	Lemberg	לעמבערג (Lemberik)
Nadvirna	Надвірна	Nadworna		נאדווארנע (Nadverne)
Peremyshliany	Перемишляни	Przemyślany		פרעמישלאן
Pidhaitsi	Підгайці	Podhajce		פודהייצא
Rava-Ruska	Рава-Руська	Rawa Ruska		ראווע (Rave)
Rohatyn	Рогатин	Rohatyń	Rohatin	רוהאטין
Sambir	Самбір	Sambor	Sambor	סאמבור
Sokal	Сокаль	Sokal	Sokal	
Stryi	Стрий	Stryj	Stryj	סטרי
Terebovl	Теребовля	Trembowla		
Ternopil	Тернопіль	Tarnopol	Tarnopol	טארנאפאל
Truskavets	Трускавець	Truskawiec	Truskawetz	
Zalishchyky	Заліщики	Zaleszczyki		
Zhovkva	Жовква	Żółkiew		ז'ובקבה (Zholkva)
Zolochiv	Золочів	Złoczów		זלאטשאוו (Zlotshev)

== Poland ==
Polish	Ukrainian (transcription)	Ukrainian (Cyrillic)	German	Yiddish (transliteration)
Biecz	Bech	Беч	Beitsch	
Bochnia	Bokhnya	Бохня	Salzberg	באכניא
Chrzanów	Khshaniv	Хшанів	Krenau (1941–1945)	קשאנוב
Dukla	Duklia	Дукля	Dukla	דיקלא
Dynów	Dyniv	Динів	Dühnhof	דינוב
Gorlice	Horlytsi	Горлиці	Gorlitz	גאָרליץ (Gurlitz)
Grybów	Hrybiv	Грибів	Grunberk	
Jarosław	Yaroslav	Ярослав	Jaroslau	יעראסלאוו (Yeroslav)
Jasło	Yaslo	Ясло	Jassel	
Jaworzno	Yavozhno	Явожно	Jaworzno	יאבוז'נו
Kraków	Krakiv	Краків	Krakau	קראקא (Kruke)
Krosno	Korosno	Коросно	Krossen	
Krynica-Zdrój	Krynytsia	Криниця	Bad Krynica	
Lesko	Lis'ko	Лісько		לינסק (Linsk)
Leżajsk	Lezhays'k	Лежайськ	Lyschansk	ליז'נסק (Lizhensk)
Limanowa	Limanova	Ліманова	Ilmenau	לימינוב (Liminuv)
Łańcut	Lantsut	Ланьцут	Landshut	לאַנצוט (Lantzut)
Myślenice	Mys'lenitse	Мисьленіце	Mischlenitz	מישלעניץ
Nowy Sącz	Novyi Sonch	Новий Сонч	Neu Sandez	צאנז (Tsanz)
Nowy Targ	Novyi Tarh	Новий Тарг	Neumarkt	
Oświęcim	Osventsim	Освенцім	Auschwitz	אשפוצין (Oshpetsin)
Przemyśl	Peremyshl'	Перемишль	Premissel	פרעמישעל
Przeworsk	Perevors'k	Переворськ		פּשעוואָרסק (Pshevorsk)
Rymanów	Rymaniv	Риманів	Reimannshau	רימנוב
Rzeszów	Riashiv	Ряшів	Reichshof (1939-1945)	ריישא (Reysha)
Sanok	Sianik	Сянік		סאניק (Sunik)
Tarnów	Tarniv	Тарнів	Tarnau	טארנא (Turne)
Trzebinia	Tshebinia	Тшебіня	Trzebinia	טשביניה
Wadowice	Vadovitse	Вадовіце	Wadowitz	ודוביץ
Wieliczka	Velychka	Величка	Groß Salze	
Zator	Zator	Затор	Neuenstadt an der Schaue	זאטער
Żywiec	Zhyvets'	Живець	Saybusch	

== See also ==
- Galicia (Eastern Europe)
- Kingdom of Galicia and Lodomeria
- List of shtetls
