= Vikno =

Vikno (Ukrainian: Вікно) means window and may refer to multiple places in Ukraine:

- Vikno, Chernivtsi Oblast
- Vikno, Ivano-Frankivsk Oblast
