= Torhovytsia =

Rural locality in Ivano-Frankivsk Oblast, Ukraine

Torhovytsia Торговиця
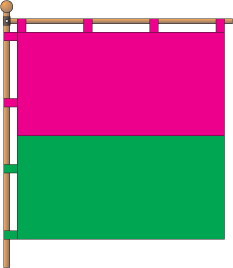
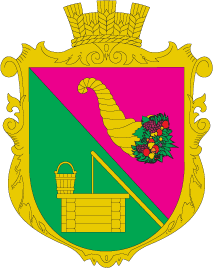
- Flag Coat of arms

- Location in Ivano-Frankivsk Oblast
- Coordinates: 48°35′44″N 25°26′20″E
- Country: Ukraine
- Oblast: Ivano-Frankivsk Oblast
- Raion: Kolomyia Raion
- Hromada: Horodenka urban hromada
- Time zone: UTC+2 (EET)
  - Summer (DST): UTC+3 (EEST)
- Postal code: 78161

Torhovytsia (Ukrainian: Торговиця) is a village in the Horodenka urban hromada of the Kolomyia Raion of Ivano-Frankivsk Oblast in Ukraine.

== History ==
The first written mention of the village was in 1410.

On 19 July 2020, as a result of the administrative-territorial reform and liquidation of the Horodenka Raion, the village became part of the Kolomyia Raion.

== Religion ==
- St. Michael church (1906, wooden).

== Notable residents ==
- Les Martovych (1871–1916), Ukrainian writer and public figure.

== In literature ==
In 2010, the Marchuk family published a book about the village called "Torgovytsia. Storinky istorii".

== Sources ==
- "Targowica (3)". Geographical Dictionary of the Kingdom of Poland (in Polish). 12. Warszawa: Kasa im. Józefa Mianowskiego. 1892. p. 172.
