= Olha Pleshkan =

Ukrainian painter, graphic artist (1898–1985)

- Ольга Іванівна Плешкан
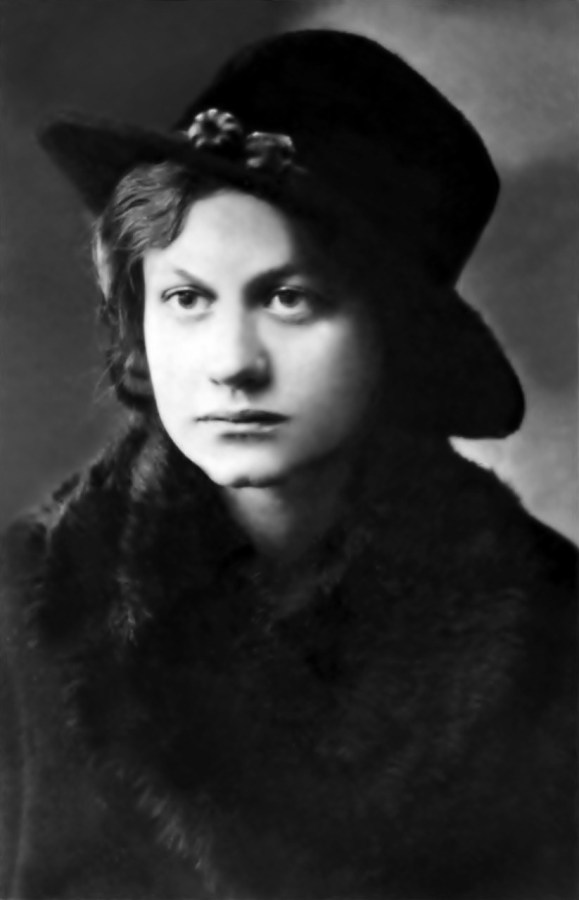
- Born: 15 June 1898; Chortovets, Austria-Hungary (now Ukraine)
- Died: 25 December 1985 (aged 87); Sniatyn, Ivano-Frankivsk Oblast, now Ukraine
- Education: Secret Ukrainian University, Oleksa Novakivskyi Art School
- Occupations: Painter, graphic artist

Olha Pleshkan (Ukrainian: Ольга Іванівна Плешкан; 15 June 1898 – 25 December 1985) was a Ukrainian painter, graphic artist. Member of the art group RUB. Daughter of Ivan Pleshkan.

== Biography ==
Olha Pleshkan was born on 15 June 1898 in Chortovets, now Kolomyia Raion, Ivano-Frankivsk Oblast.

In 1913, she graduated from the Ukrainian Women's Gymnasium of the Basilian Sisters in Lviv, in 1928 from the Ukrainian Private Gymnasium in Horodenka, and in 1922 from the philosophy and in 1925 from the philology departments of the Secret Ukrainian University in Lviv. Until 1932, she attended the Oleksa Novakivskyi Art School, with which she participated in reporting exhibitions in 1930–1933.

During 1932–1957, she lived in the family of the writer Vasyl Stefanyk in Rusiv (now Kolomyia Raion). In 1941–1957 she was a guide at the Vasyl Stefanyk Museum.

From 1957, she lived in Sniatyn, where in 1995 an art-memorial museum was founded in her honor. One of the streets in the town was named after her.

She died on 26 December 1985 in Sniatyn, Ivano-Frankivsk Oblast.

== Creativity ==
She mostly painted landscapes, worked in linocut, watercolor, and drawing techniques.

She participated in exhibitions, including a joint one with Stefania Gebus-Baranetska and Hryhorii Smolskyi, which took place in Lviv in 1962. A personal posthumous exhibition was held in 1993, also in Lviv. Some of her paintings are kept in the collections of museums in Ivano-Frankivsk, Lviv, the Marko Cheremshyna Museum in Sniatyn, and the Vasyl Stefanyk Museum in Rusiv.

Among the main paintings:

- "U domi Danylovychiv u Berezyni (za chytanniam istorii Ukrainy)" (1916), "Pered skhodom sontsia", "Berezovyi hai", "Berezyna. Dolyna Dnistra", "Piznie lito. Soniakhy" (all – 1910s.), "I. Danylovych" (1920–1930s), "Zakhid sontsia" (1925), "Peizazh", "Rusivska khashcha", "Khlopchyk na berezi richky" (all — 1926), "Avtoportret" (1926, 1928), "Polupiky" (1928), "Zhorzhyny. Natiurmort", "Yablunka v sadu V. Stefanyka" (both — 1929), "Mak tsvite", "Maty u krisli", "Stezhka v horakh2 (all — 1920s.), «Dnister bilia s. Horyhliady», "Nad Prutom. Prachka", sketch "Hutsulyk z Kosmacha" (all — 1930), "Litnii peizazh" (1931), "Prialia", "Zhinka v peremittsi" (both — 1932), "Portret materi" (1935), "Divchyna z s. Tulovy" (1938), "Avtoportret u temnii sukni", "Zyma. Yablunka v sadu V. Stefanyka" (both — 1930s), "U zhnyva" (1942), "H. Shymonovych-Rudnytska" (1944), "Portret maloho Andriia z Tulovy" (1945), still life "Lilii" (1953), "Khryzantemy. Natiurmort", "Natiurmort z yablukamy" (both — 1950s), "Vasyl ta Sofiia Stefanyky" (both — 1960), "Ochystka kukurudzy" (1961), "Kraievyd s. Tulovy" (1963), "Soniashnyk" (1967), "Kraievyd Yaremchi"(1969);
- prints — "Moloda (kniehynia z Tulovy)", "Vyshyvalnytsia", "Za vyshyvanniam", "Hutsulka na verandi" (all — 1960s).
