= Vikno, Ivano-Frankivsk Oblast =

Rural locality in Ivano-Frankivsk Oblast, Ukraine

Coordinates: 48°34′N 25°58′E

Vikno
- Village
- Ukrainian: Вікно
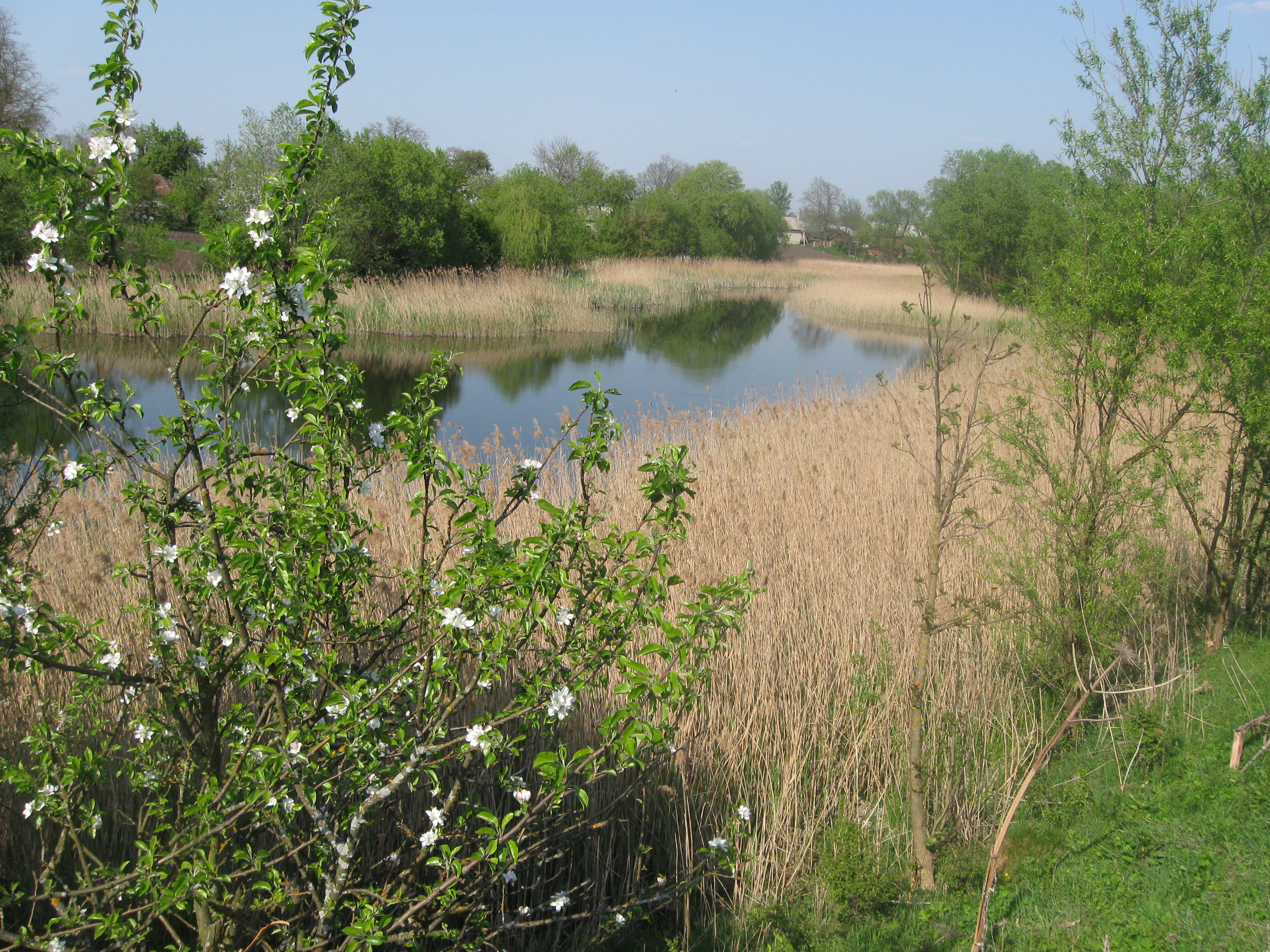
- Vikno, Ivano-Frankivs'ka oblast, Ukraine, 78125 - panoramio

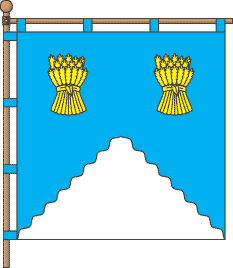
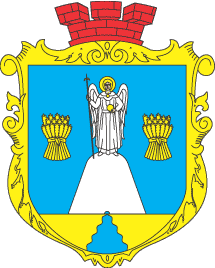
- Flag Coat of arms
- Interactive map of Vikno
- Country: Ukraine
- Oblast: Ivano-Frankivsk Oblast
- Raion: Kolomyia Raion
- Population: 1,339

Vikno (Ukrainian: Вікно, translated from Ukrainian as Window) is a Ukrainian village (from the 16th century to 17th century — market town) located in Kolomyia Raion (district) of Ivano-Frankivsk Oblast (province). It belongs to Horodenka urban hromada, one of the hromadas of Ukraine.

== History ==
Founded in times of Galicia-Volhynia Kingdom. Strange name comes from a spring, which does not freeze even in winter. The first saved mention of Vikno in the historical sources — under 1453 year.

Until 18 July 2020, Vikno belonged to Horodenka Raion. The raion was abolished in July 2020 as part of the administrative reform of Ukraine, which reduced the number of raions of Ivano-Frankivsk Oblast to six. The area of Horodenka Raion was merged into Kolomyia Raion.
