= Horodenka urban hromada =

Hromada in Ivano-Frankivsk Oblast, Ukraine

Horodenka urban hromada Городенківська міська громада
- Hromada
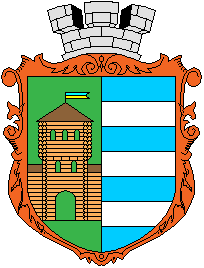
- Seal
- Interactive map of Horodenka urban hromada
- Country: Ukraine
- Oblast: Ivano-Frankivsk Oblast
- Raion: Kolomyia Raion
- Admin. center: Horodenka

Area
  - Total: 662 km^{2} (256 sq mi)

Population (2020)
  - Total: 44,746
  - Density: 67.6/km^{2} (175/sq mi)
- CATOTTG code: UA26080030000014307
- Settlements: 40
- Cities: 1
- Rural settlements: 1
- Villages: 38
- Website: hth.gov.ua

Horodenka urban hromada (Ukrainian: Городенківська міська громада) is a hromada in Ukraine, in Kolomyia Raion of Ivano-Frankivsk Oblast. The administrative center is the city of Horodenka.

== Settlements ==
The hromada consists of 1 city (Horodenka) and 39 villages:

- Bilka
- Cherniatyn
- Chortovets
- Hlushkiv
- Horodnytsia
- Khvalyboha
- Kotykivka
- Luka
- Monastyrok
- Mykhalche
- Nezvysko
- Novoselivka
- Oliievo-Korolivka
- Oliievo-Korniv
- Ostrivets
- Peredivannia
- Potochyshche
- Probabyn
- Prykmyshche
- Rakovets
- Rashkiv
- Rohynia
- Rosokhach
- Semakivtsi
- Semenivka
- Serafyntsi
- Slobidka
- Soroky
- Strilche
- Toporivtsi
- Torhovytsia
- Tyshkivtsi
- Unizh
- Verbivtsi
- Vynohrad
- Vikno
- Voroniv
- Yakubivka
- Yaseniv-Pilnyi
