= Horodenka Raion =

Former subdivision of Ivano-Frankivsk Oblast, Ukraine

Horodenka Raion Городенківський район
- Raion
- Horodenkivskyi raion
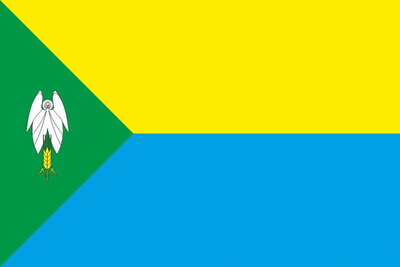
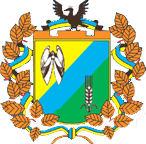
- Flag Coat of arms

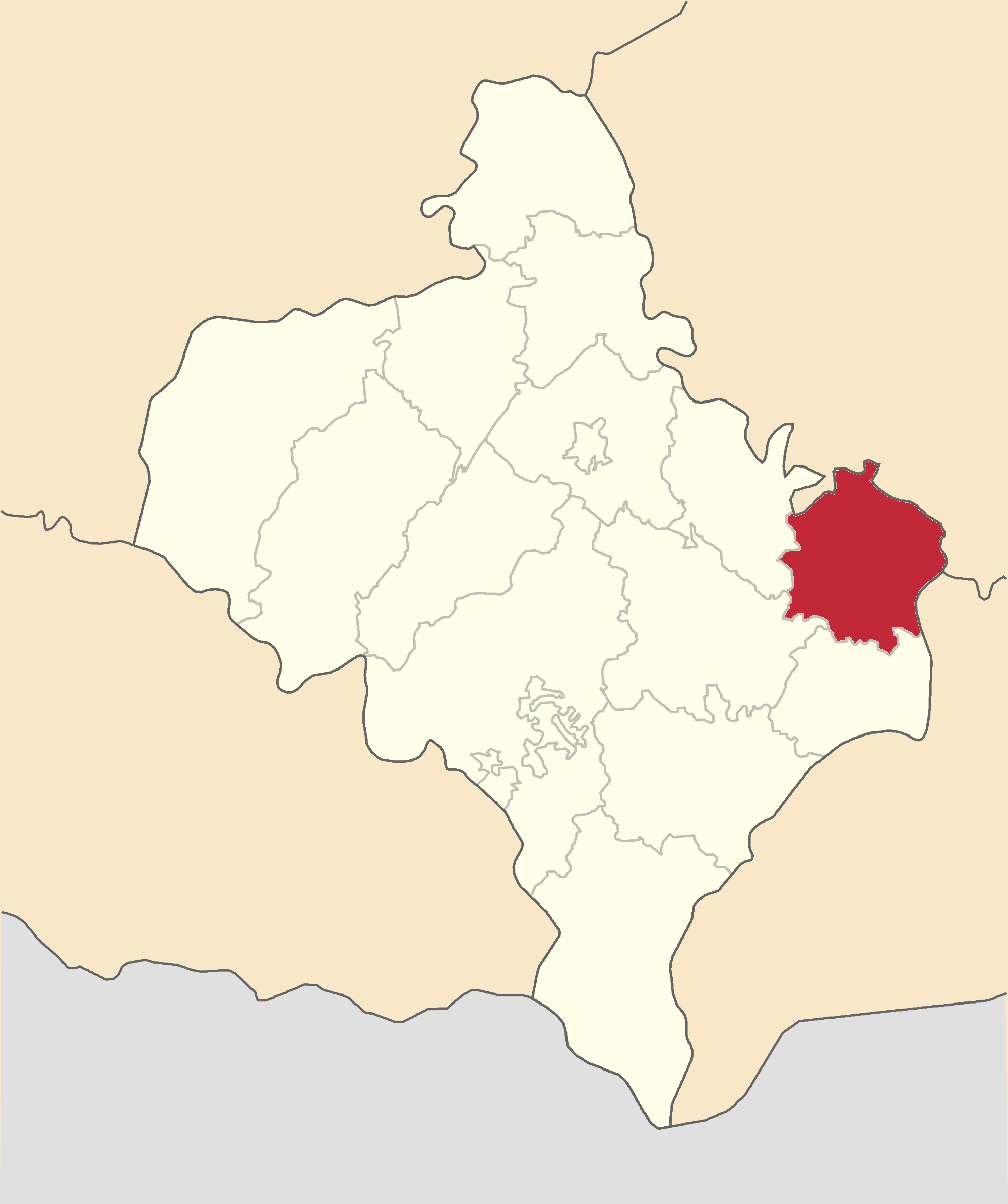
- Coordinates: 48°42′23″N 25°25′12″E
- Country: Ukraine
- Region: Ivano-Frankivsk Oblast
- Disestablished: 18 July 2020
- Admin. center: Horodenka
- Subdivisions: List: — city councils; — settlement councils; — rural councils; Number of localities: — cities; — urban-type settlements; 48 — villages; — rural settlements

Government
  - Governor: Vasyl Yemchuk

Area
  - Total: 747 km^{2} (288 sq mi)

Population (2020)
  - Total: 51,370
  - Density: 68.8/km^{2} (178/sq mi)
- Time zone: UTC+02:00 (EET)
  - Summer (DST): UTC+03:00 (EEST)
- Postal index: 285800
- Area code: ?
- Website: Raion Profile

Horodenka Raion (Ukrainian: Городенківський райо́н, romanized: Horodenkivs'kyj rajon) was a raion (district) of Ivano-Frankivsk Oblast (region) of Ukraine. The city of Horodenka was the administrative center of the raion. The raion was abolished on 18 July 2020 as part of the administrative reform of Ukraine, which reduced the number of raions of Ivano-Frankivsk Oblast Oblast to six. The area of Horodenka Raion was merged into Kolomyia Raion. The last estimate of the raion population was 51,370 (2020 est.).

== Subdivisions ==
At the time of disestablishment, the raion consisted of two hromadas:

- Chernelytsia settlement hromada with the administration in the urban-type settlement of Chernelytsia;
- Horodenka urban hromada with the administration in the city of Horodenka.

== Demography ==
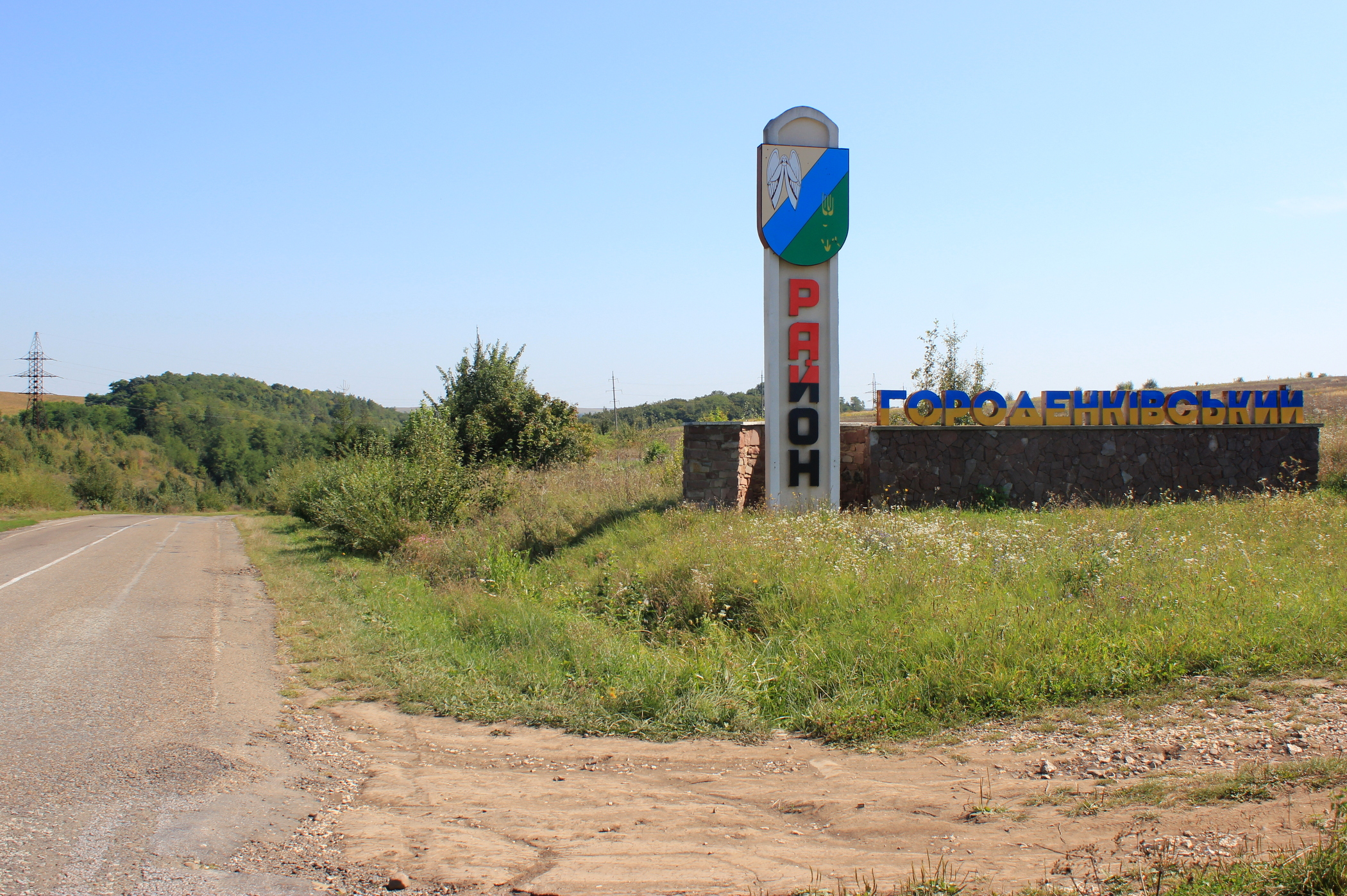
Raion border near Nezvysko

According to the 2010 estimate, it had a total population of 60,881 inhabitants.
