= Horodenka =

Urban locality in Ivano-Frankivsk Oblast, Ukraine

Horodenka Городенка
- City
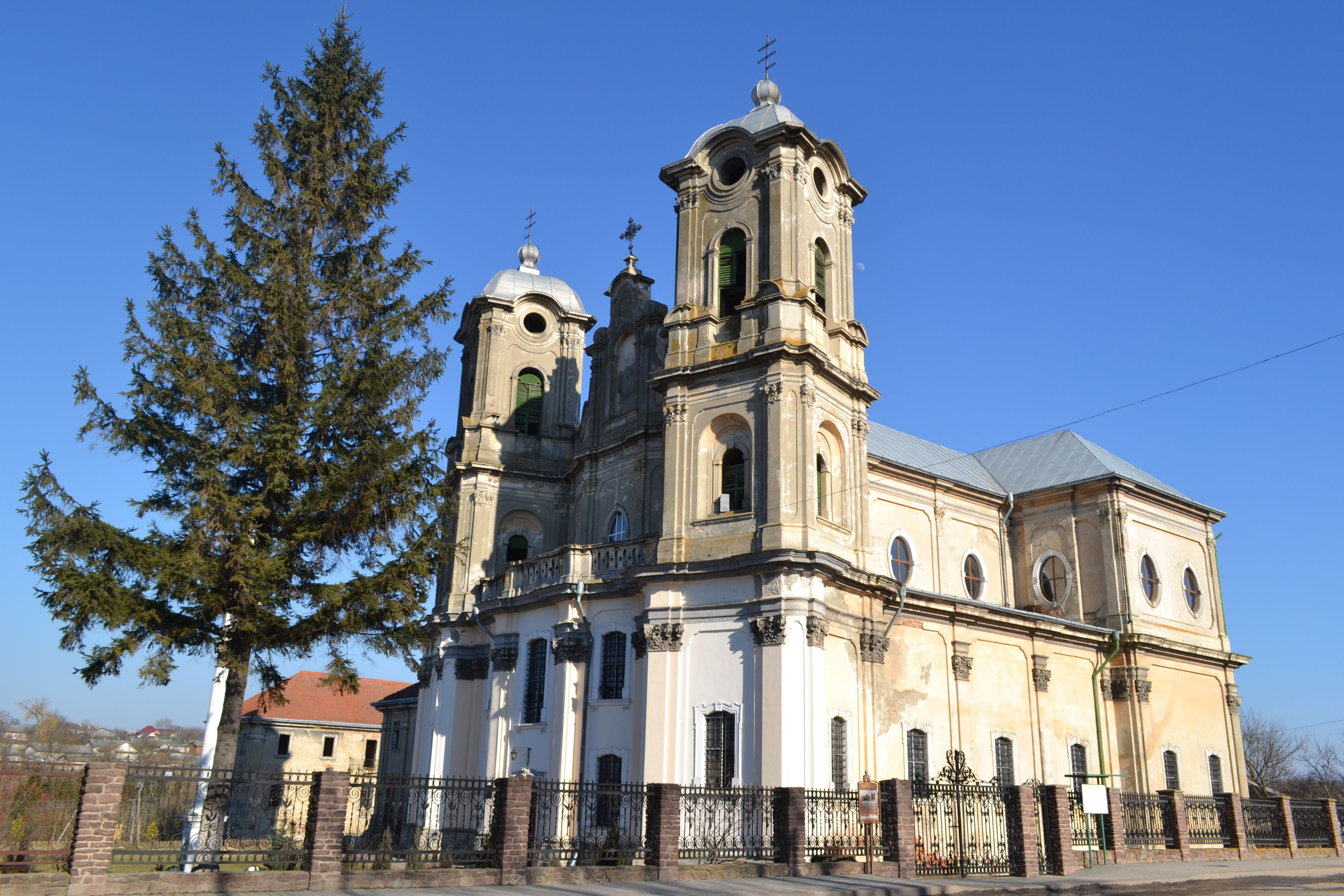
- Church of Immaculate Conception

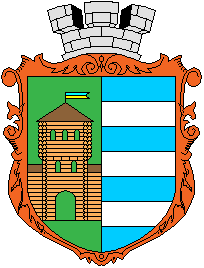
- Coat of arms

- Location of Horodenka within Ukraine Horodenka (Ukraine)
- Coordinates: 48°40′3″N 25°30′1″E
- Country: Ukraine
- Oblast: Ivano-Frankivsk Oblast
- Raion: Kolomyia Raion
- Hromada: Horodenka urban hromada

Population (2022)
  - Total: 8,812

Horodenka (Ukrainian: Городенка, IPA: [ɦoroˈdɛnkɐ]; Polish: Horodenka, occasionally Horodence; Yiddish: האָראָדענקע, romanized: Horodenke) is a city located in Kolomyia Raion, Ivano-Frankivsk Oblast, in Western Ukraine. It hosts the administration of Horodenka urban hromada, one of the hromadas of Ukraine. Population: 8,812 (2022 estimate). In 2001 the population was around 9,800.

== Geography ==
The city is located near Dniester river, its upper stream section, and in area where three historical regions meet, Pokuttia (Angled land), Bucovina (Beech woodland), and Podolia (Lower land). Horodenka is also located near the foothills of Carpathian mountains which separate East European Plain from Pannonian Plain.

== History ==
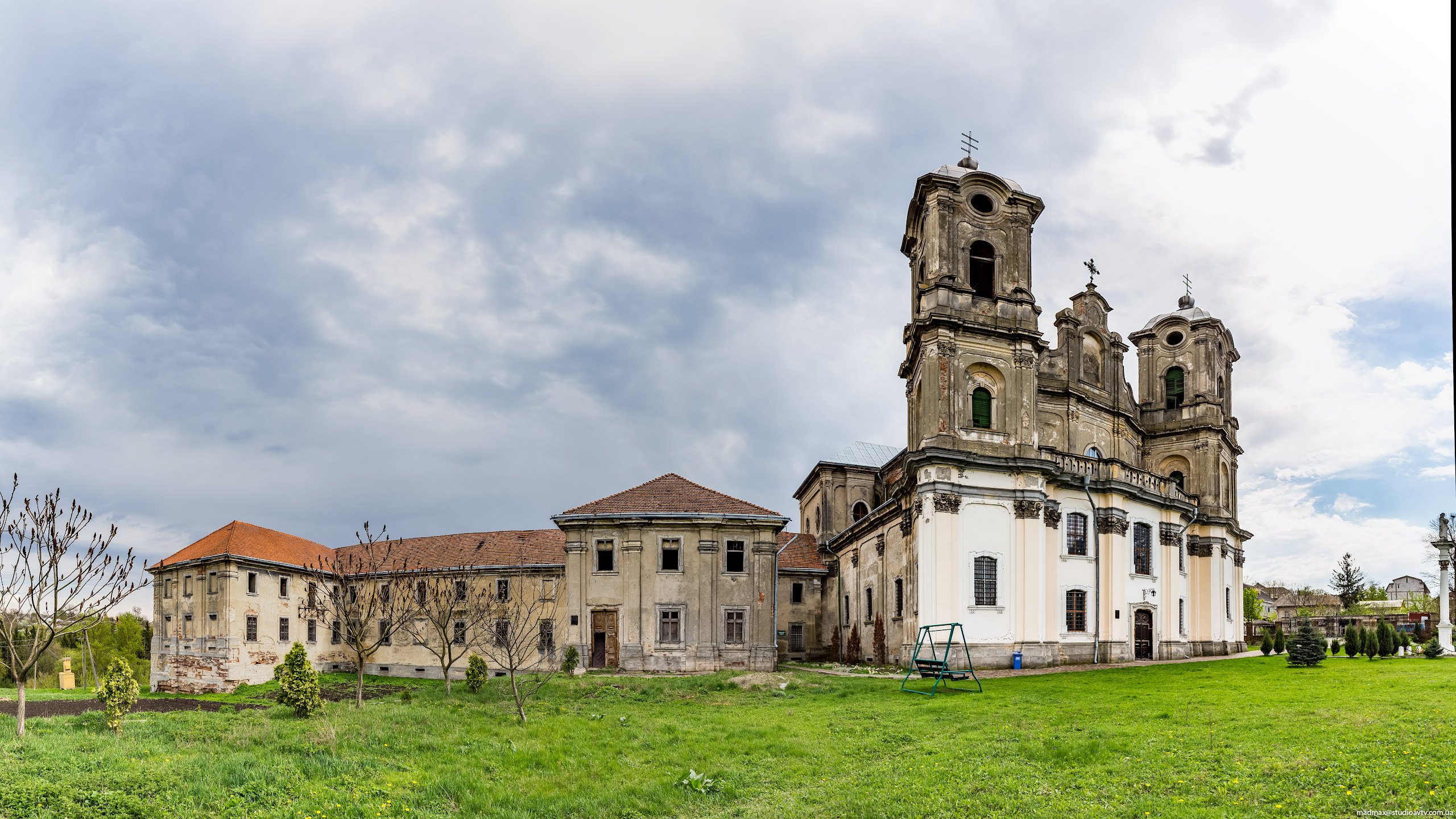
Church of Immaculate Conception

The first mention of Horodenka was in 1195, when it was described as a village in the Kingdom of Galicia–Volhynia inhabited by farmers and craftsmen. It was later part of the Polish–Lithuanian Commonwealth until 1772. On the Ptolemy's world map, near the modern city of Horodenka, there is identified the city "Carrodunum" on Tyras (wagon city).

The 17th century saw a significant influx of Armenian immigrants to Horodenka. In 1706, a large Armenian Catholic church was erected in the town. In 1668 it became one of the Polish towns to be chartered under Magdeburg rights, through the use of a privilege known as "settlement with German law”.

Historical population
Year	Pop.	±%
1921	9,907	—
1931	12,303	+24.2%
2022	8,812	−28.4%

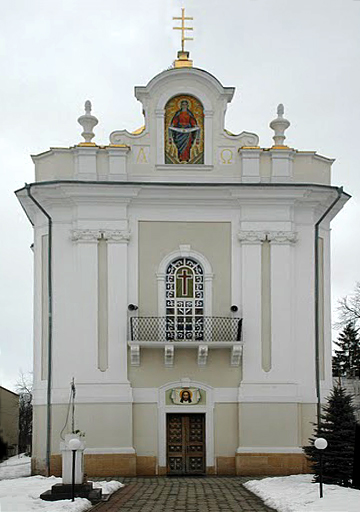
Church of Assumption

From the First Partition of Poland in 1772 until 1918, the town was part of the Austrian monarchy (Austria side after the compromise of 1867), head of the district with the same name, one of the 78 Bezirkshauptmannschaften in Austrian Galicia province (Crown land) in 1900. The fate of this province was then disputed between Poland and Ukraine, until the Peace of Riga in 1921.

In the period of the Second Polish Republic, it was a county capital within the Stanisławów Voivodeship.

Following the joint German-Soviet invasion of Poland, which started World War II in September 1939, the village was occupied by the Soviet Union until 1941, then by Nazi Germany until 1944, and re-occupied by the Soviet Union, which annexed it from Poland in 1945. The Jewish population of Horodenka, comprising about half of the town's population, were shot and killed in a mass grave by the Nazis. About a dozen Jews survived and formed a partisan combat unit which fought against the Nazis and hid in the forests. There is a synagogue in Salford, England named in honour of this community.

Until 18 July 2020, Horodenka was the administrative center of Horodenka Raion. The raion was abolished in July 2020 as part of the administrative reform of Ukraine, which reduced the number of raions of Ivano-Frankivsk Oblast to six. The area of Horodenka Raion was merged into Kolomyia Raion.

== Economy ==
Horodenka is a historical centre of sugar industry and spirits production.

== Notable people ==
- Ben Bonus, Yiddish theater actor and singer
- Nicholas Charnetsky (1884–1959), Ukrainian Catholic bishop and martyr.
- Kasper Cieglewicz, Polish poet and independence activist, one of the Ruthenian sobor organizers.
- Yuliya Dumanska, handball goalkeeper who plays for the Romanian national team since 2016.
- Jakob Edelstein, Elder of the Jews in Theresienstadt.
- Alfred Fiderkiewicz, political activist, mayor of Kraków, deputy to the Sejm in the interwar period.
- Salo Flohr, chess grandmaster.
- Alexander Granach (Jessaja Szajko Gronish), leading stage and film actor in Weimar Germany, died at 52 while establishing himself in Hollywood and on Broadway. Author of autobiography, There Goes an Actor [new edition: From the Shtetl to the Stage: the Odyssey of a Wandering Actor].
- Seweryn Hammer, Polish scholar, professor of several universities.
- Elias Jubal (born as Benno Neumann 12.1.1901), theatre director and founder of the Kellertheater "Theater für 49" in Vienna.
- Dr. Wladimir Sylvester Kindraczuk (1882–1969), discoverer of Bacillus carpathicus in huslanka.
- Marie Ljalková, sniper in the Soviet army.
- Rabbi Nachman of Horodenka, a disciple of the Baal Shem Tov.
- Jan Stebnowski, Polish painter and publicist.
- Aleksander Topolski, soldier, architect, and writer, author of "Without Vodka".
- Dmytro Zipchen, Canadian politician.
- Ignaz Zloczower, Résistance Fighter (1876–1942)
