= Administrative divisions of Ivano-Frankivsk Oblast =

Ivano-Frankivsk Oblast is subdivided into districts (raions) which are further subdivided into territorial communities (hromadas).

== Current ==
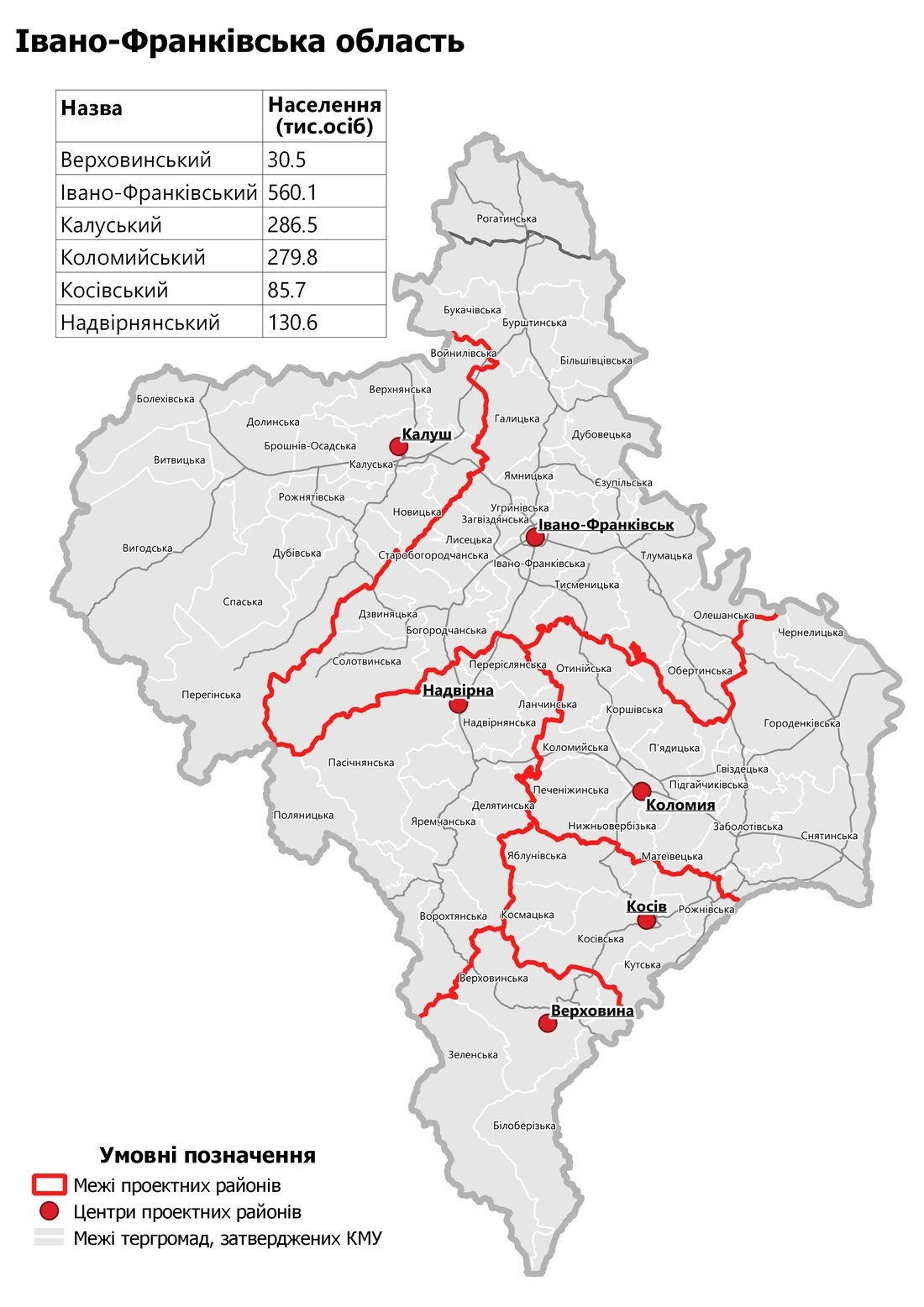
Raions of Ivano-Frankivsk Oblast as of August 2020.

On 18 July 2020, the number of districts was reduced to six. These are:

1. Ivano-Frankivsk (Івано-Франківський район), the center is in the city of Ivano-Frankivsk;
2. Kalush (Калуський район), the center is in the city of Kalush;
3. Kolomyia (Коломийський район), the center is in the city of Kolomyia;
4. Kosiv (Косівський район), the center is in the city of Kosiv;
5. Nadvirna (Надвірнянський район), the center is in the city of Nadvirna;
6. Verkhovyna (Верховинський район), the center is in the rural settlement of Verkhovyna.

**Ivano-Frankivsk Oblast**
As of January 1, 2022
Number of districts (райони)	6
Number of hromadas (громади)	62

=== Communities (hromadas) per District (raion) ===
In bold are communities (hromadas) with cities

Ivano-Frankivsk Raion

- Bilshivtsi
- Bohorodchany
- Bukachivtsi
- **Burshtyn**
- Dubivtsi
- Dzvyniach
- **Halych**
- **Ivano-Frankivsk**
- Lysets
- Obertyn
- Olesha
- **Rohatyn**
- Solotvyn
- Stari Bohorodchany
- **Tysmenytsia**
- **Tlumach**
- Uhryniv
- Yamnytsia
- Yezupil
- Zahvizdia

Kalush Raion

- **Bolekhiv**
- Broshniv-Osada
- **Dolyna**
- Duba
- **Kalush**
- Novytsia
- Perehinske
- Rozhniativ
- Spas
- Verkhnia
- Voynyliv
- Vyhoda
- Vytvytsia

Kolomyia Raion

- Chernelytsia
- Hvizdets
- **Horodenka**
- **Kolomyia**
- Korshiv
- Mateyivtsi
- Nyzhniy Verbizh
- Otyniya
- Pechenizhyn
- Pidhaichyky
- Pyadyky
- **Sniatyn**
- Zabolotiv

Kosiv Raion

- **Kosiv**
- Kosmach
- Kuty
- Rozhniv
- Yabluniv

Nadvirna Raion

- Deliatyn
- Lanchyn
- **Nadvirna**
- Pasichna
- Pererisl
- Polianytsia
- Vorokhta
- **Yaremche**

Verkhovyna Raion

- Biloberizka
- Verkhovyna
- Zelene

== Administrative divisions until 2020 ==
Raions of Ivano-Frankivsk Oblast as of June 2020. The city of Ivano-Frankivsk is shown in dark blue.

Before July 2020, Ivano-Frankivsk Oblast was subdivided into 20 regions: 14 districts (raions) and 6 city municipalities (mis'krada or misto), officially known as territories governed by city councils.

- Cities under the oblast's jurisdiction:
  - Ivano-Frankivsk Municipality
    - Cities under the city's jurisdiction:
      - Ivano-Frankivsk (Івано-Франківськ), the administrative center of the oblast
  - Bolekhiv Municipality
    - Cities under the city's jurisdiction:
      - Bolekhiv (Болехів)
  - Burshtyn Municipality
    - Cities under the city's jurisdiction:
      - Burshtyn (Бурштин)
  - Kalush (Калуш)
  - Kolomyia (Коломия)
  - Yaremche Municipality
    - Cities under the city's jurisdiction:
      - Yaremche (Яремче)
    - Urban-type settlements under the city's jurisdiction:
      - Vorokhta (Ворохта)
- Districts (raions):
  - Bohorodchany (Богородчанський район)
    - Urban-type settlements under the district's jurisdiction:
      - Bohorodchany (Богородчани)
      - Solotvyn (Солотвин)
  - Dolyna (Долинський район)
    - Cities under the city's jurisdiction:
      - Dolyna (Долина)
    - Urban-type settlements under the district's jurisdiction:
      - Vyhoda (Вигода)
  - Halych (Галицький район)
    - Cities under the city's jurisdiction:
      - Halych (Галич)
    - Urban-type settlements under the district's jurisdiction:
      - Bilshivtsi (Більшівці)
  - Horodenka (Городенківський район)
    - Cities under the city's jurisdiction:
      - Horodenka (Городенка)
    - Urban-type settlements under the district's jurisdiction:
      - Chernelytsia (Чернелиця)
  - Kalush (Калуський район)
    - Urban-type settlements under the district's jurisdiction:
      - Voinyliv (Войнилів)
  - Kolomyia (Коломийський район)
    - Urban-type settlements under the district's jurisdiction:
      - Hvizdets (Гвіздець)
      - Otyniia (Отинія)
      - Pechenizhyn (Печеніжин)
  - Kosiv (Косівський район)
    - Cities under the city's jurisdiction:
      - Kosiv (Косів)
    - Urban-type settlements under the district's jurisdiction:
      - Kuty (Кути)
      - Yabluniv (Яблунів)
  - Nadvirna (Надвірнянський район)
    - Cities under the city's jurisdiction:
      - Nadvirna (Надвірна)
    - Urban-type settlements under the district's jurisdiction:
      - Bytkiv (Битків)
      - Deliatyn (Делятин)
      - Lanchyn (Ланчин)
  - Rohatyn (Рогатинський район)
    - Cities under the city's jurisdiction:
      - Rohatyn (Рогатин)
    - Urban-type settlements under the district's jurisdiction:
      - Bukachivtsi (Букачівці)
  - Rozhniativ (Рожнятівський район)
    - Urban-type settlements under the district's jurisdiction:
      - Broshniv-Osada (Брошнів-Осада)
      - Perehinske (Перегінське)
      - Rozhniativ (Рожнятів)
  - Sniatyn (Снятинський район)
    - Cities under the city's jurisdiction:
      - Sniatyn (Снятин)
    - Urban-type settlements under the district's jurisdiction:
      - Zabolotiv (Заболотів)
  - Tlumach (Тлумацький район)
    - Cities under the city's jurisdiction:
      - Tlumach (Тлумач)
    - Urban-type settlements under the district's jurisdiction:
      - Obertyn (Обертин)
  - Tysmenytsia (Тисменицький район)
    - Cities under the city's jurisdiction:
      - Tysmenytsia (Тисмениця)
    - Urban-type settlements under the district's jurisdiction:
      - Lysets (Лисець)
      - Yezupil (Єзупіль)
  - Verkhovyna (Верховинський район)
    - Urban-type settlements under the district's jurisdiction:
      - Verkhovyna (Верховина)
