= List of cities in Ivano-Frankivsk Oblast =

Location of cities in Ivano-Frankivsk Oblast

There are 15 populated places in Ivano-Frankivsk Oblast, Ukraine, that have been officially granted city status (Ukrainian: місто, romanized: misto) by the Verkhovna Rada, the country's parliament. Settlements with more than 10,000 people are eligible for city status, although the status is typically also granted to settlements of historical or regional importance. As of 5 December 2001, the date of the first and only official census in the country since independence, (Note: As of 11 July 2023) the most populous city in the oblast was the regional capital, Ivano-Frankivsk, with a population of 218,359 people, while the least populous city was Halych, with 6,495 people. A wooden church in Rohatyn is part of one of Ukraine's eight World Heritage Sites recognized by UNESCO.

From independence in 1991 to 2020, six cities in the oblast were designated as cities of regional significance (municipalities), which had self-government under city councils, while the oblast's remaining nine cities were located in fourteen raions (districts) as cities of district significance, which are subordinated to the governments of the raions. On 18 July 2020, an administrative reform abolished and merged the oblast's raions and cities of regional significance into six new, expanded raions. The six raions that make up the oblast are Ivano-Frankivsk, Kalush, Kolomyia, Kosiv, Nadvirna, and Verkhovyna.

== List of cities ==
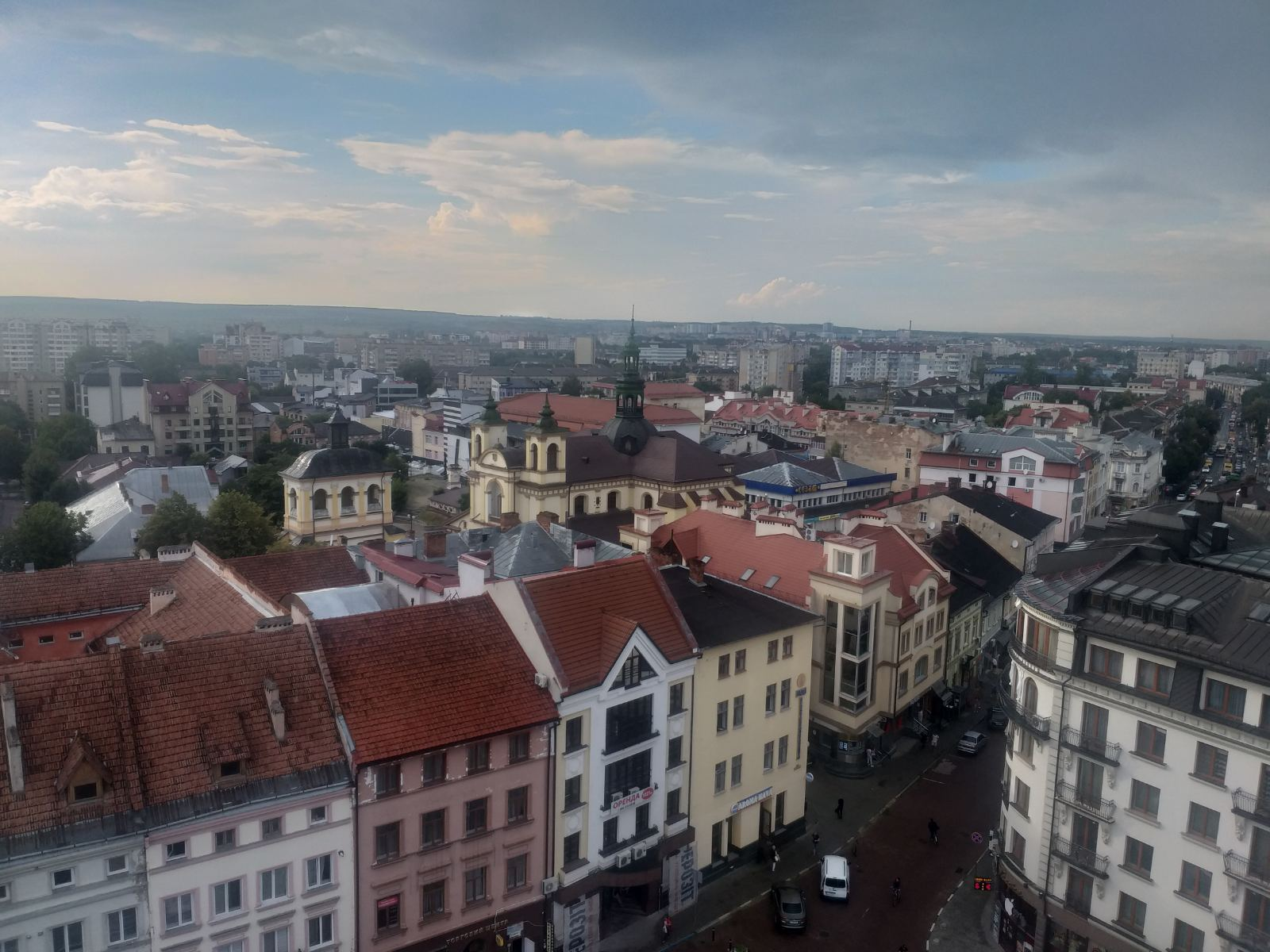
Ivano-Frankivsk, capital and most populous city in Ivano-Frankivsk Oblast

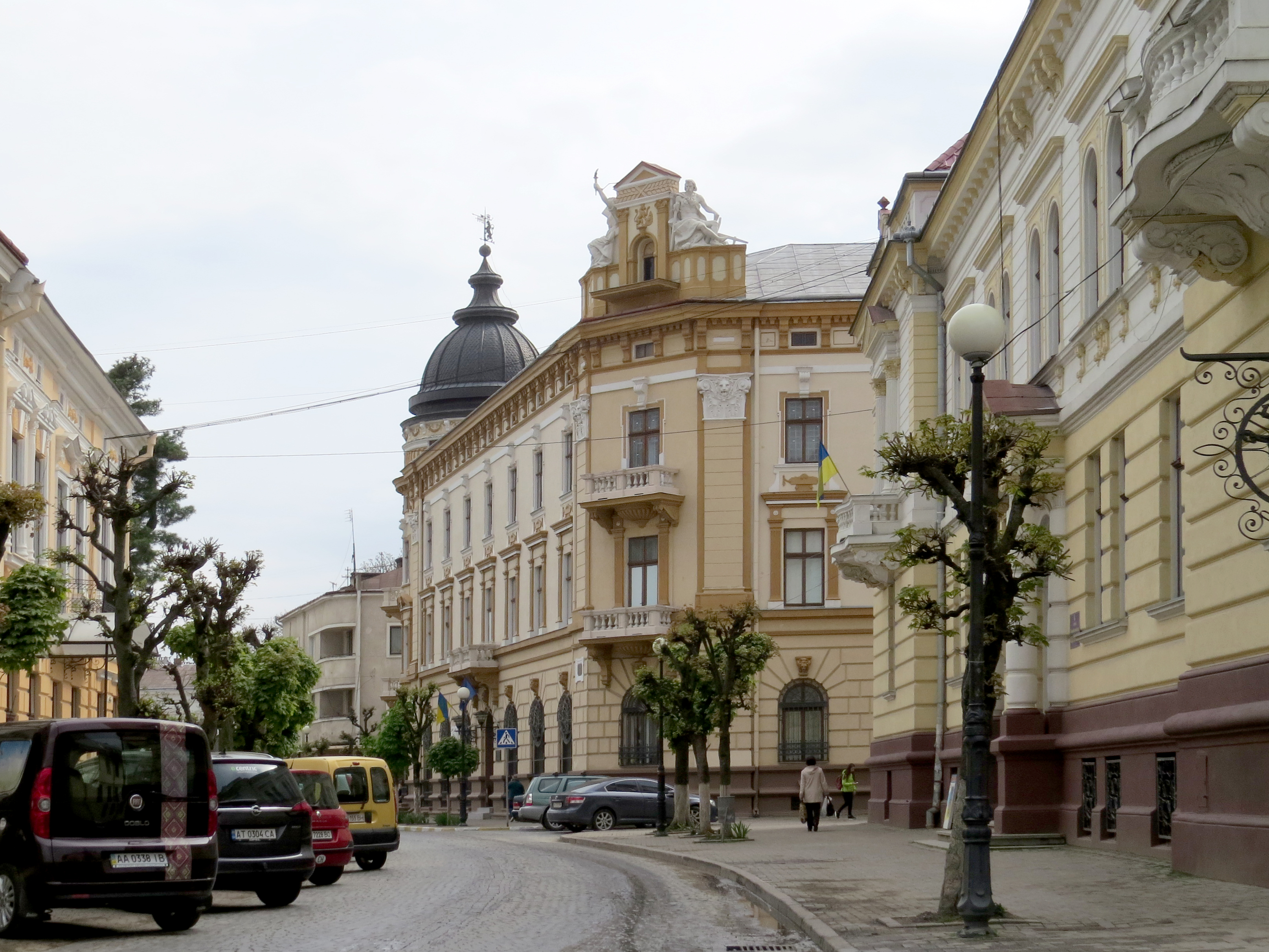
Kolomyia, third most populous city in the oblast and a trade and culture center

Kosiv, a small city known for its painted ceramics

Cities in Ivano-Frankivsk Oblast
Name	Name (in Ukrainian) (Note: Links to the Ukrainian Wikipedia articles for each city)	Raion (district)	Population (2022 estimates)	Population (2001 census)	Population change
Bolekhiv	Болехів	Kalush	10,259	10,633	−3.52%
Burshtyn	Бурштин	Ivano-Frankivsk	14,737	15,298	−3.67%
Dolyna	Долина	Kalush	20,417	20,906	−2.34%
Halych	Галич	Ivano-Frankivsk	6,086	6,495	−6.30%
Horodenka	Городенка	Kolomyia	8,812	9,794	−10.03%
Ivano-Frankivsk	Івано-Франківськ	Ivano-Frankivsk	238,196	218,359	+9.08%
Kalush	Калуш	Kalush	65,088	67,902	−4.14%
Kolomyia	Коломия	Kolomyia	60,821	61,989	−1.88%
Kosiv	Косів	Kosiv	8,351	8,301	+0.60%
Nadvirna	Надвірна	Nadvirna	22,504	20,932	+7.51%
Rohatyn	Рогатин	Ivano-Frankivsk	7,521	8,607	−12.62%
Sniatyn	Снятин	Kolomyia	9,718	10,479	−7.26%
Tlumach	Тлумач	Ivano-Frankivsk	8,689	8,831	−1.61%
Tysmenytsia	Тисмениця	Ivano-Frankivsk	8,958	9,790	−8.50%
Yaremche	Яремче	Nadvirna	7,907	7,850	+0.73%

== See also ==
- List of cities in Ukraine
