= Saint Paraskeva Church, Velykyi Kliuchiv =

Ukrainian Orthodox church in Velykyi Kliuchiv, Ukraine

Saint Paraskeva Church
- Церква Преподобної Параскеви Сербської
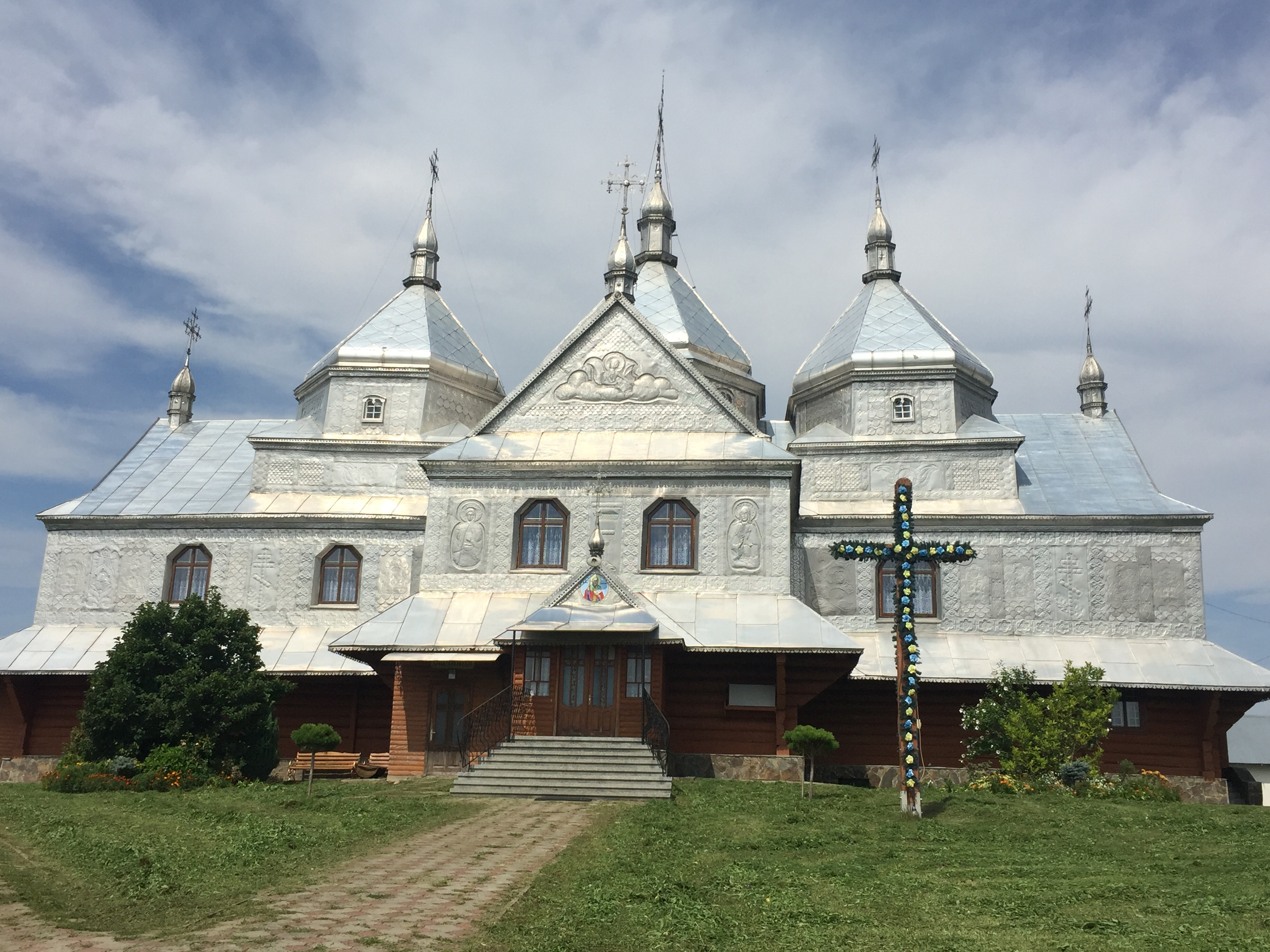

Religion
- Affiliation: Orthodox Church of Ukraine

Location
- Location: Velykyi Kliuchiv
- Interactive map of Saint Paraskeva Church
- Coordinates: 48°27′59″N 24°56′32″E

Architecture
- Completed: 1864

Saint Paraskeva Church (Ukrainian: Церква Преподобної Параскеви Сербської) is an orthodox parish church (OCU) in Velykyi Kliuchiv of the Nyzhnii Verbizh Hromada, Kolomyia Raion, Ivano-Frankivsk Oblast, and an architectural monument of local importance.

== History of the church ==
The church was first mentioned in 1515 in the tax register of the Ruthenian Voivodeship.

In 1862–1864, a new wooden church covered with shingles was built on the site of the old church. In the 1930s, it was covered with galvanized tin.

In 1933–1934, the restoration of the icons, the painting of the bathhouse, and the creation of twelve images of the Way of the Cross were performed by painter Pavlo Zaporizhskyi.

In 1983, at the expense of the community, the iconostasis was restored and parquet was installed; in 1989, the church and bell tower were covered with aluminum tin with minting; in 1990, the restoration was completed and the church was consecrated; in 1996, the priest's residence was built; in 2013, the foundation of the church was repaired; in 2000, a chapel was consecrated in honor of the 2000th anniversary of the Nativity of Christ.

On 8 December 2023, during restoration work, four tridents were discovered in the altar part of the church. All of them had been kept for many years under the icons of the Baptist of Kievan Rus' Vladimir the Great, Olga, St. Nicholas the Wonderworker, and the Demetrius.

== Priests ==
- Vasyl Slonevskyi ([1832]–1864+)
- Yosyf Slavskyi (1864–1865, administrator)
- Severyn Lytvynovych (1865–1881)
- Mykola Debelskyi (1881–1892+)
- Mykola Blonskyi (1841–1846, assistant priest)
- Ivan Dolynskyi (1846–1850, assistant priest)
- Semen Savrasevych (1851–1854, assistant priest)
- Yosyp Slavskyi (1854–1864, assistant priest)
- Teofil Dobrianskyi (1865–1866, assistant priest)
- Mykola Drohomyretskyi (1866–1868, assistant priest)
- Dmytro Loivaniuk (1869–1875, assistant priest)
- Semen Pavliuk (1875–1884, assistant priest)
- Kostiantyn Tsisyk (1884–1892, assistant priest)
- Mykola Uzhytchak (from 1987)

== Sources ==
- "Kluczów Wielki i Mały, pow. kołomyjski". Geographical Dictionary of the Kingdom of Poland (in Polish). 4. Warszawa: Kasa im. Józefa Mianowskiego. 1883. p. 167.
- "Великий Ключів". Дерев'яні церкви Західної України.
