= Uhornyky =

Uhornyky (Ukrainian: Угорники) may refer to the following places in Ukraine:

- Uhornyky, Ivano-Frankivsk Raion, Ivano-Frankivsk Oblast, village in Ivano-Frankivsk municipality, Ivano-Frankivsk Oblast
- Uhornyky, Kolomyia Raion, Ivano-Frankivsk Oblast, village in Kolomyia Raion, Ivano-Frankivsk Oblast
