= Cheremkhiv =

Rural locality in Ivano-Frankivsk Oblast, Ukraine

Cheremkhiv Черемхів
- Interactive map of Cheremkhiv
- Location of Cheremkhiv Cheremkhiv (Ukraine)
- Coordinates: 48°40′58″N 24°57′36″E
- Country: Ukraine
- Oblast: Ivano-Frankivsk
- Raion: Kolomyia
- Hromada: Korshiv rural hromada
- Established: 1437

Area
  - Total: 18.38 km^{2} (7.10 sq mi)
- Elevation: 331 m (1,086 ft)

Population (2001)
  - Total: 1,500
  - Density: 82/km^{2} (210/sq mi)

Cheremkhiv (Ukrainian: Черемхів, Yiddish: טשערעמכיוו, Polish: Czeremchów) is a village in Kolomyia Raion in Ivano-Frankivsk Oblast (province) of Ukraine. It was a town in the Kolomyia Administrative District of Galicia. It belongs to Korshiv rural hromada, one of the hromadas of Ukraine. The settlement was founded in 1437. Population is 1,500 (2001).
