= Nyzhnia Velesnytsia =

Rural locality in Ivano-Frankivsk Oblast, Ukraine

Coordinates: 48°43′30″N 24°45′06″E

Nyzhnia Velesnytsia (Ukrainian: Нижня Велесниця) is a small village in Kolomyia Raion of Ivano-Frankivsk Oblast of Ukraine. It belongs to Otyniia settlement hromada, one of the hromadas of Ukraine.

Population is 361 people, according to the Ukrainian Census of 2001 . Village's area is 16,86 km². Post code - 78221, dial code - 03433.
