= Beremiany =

Beremiany is the name of two villages in Ukraine:

- Beremiany, Buchach Raion
- Beremiany, Kolomyia Raion
