= Pavlo Zaporizhskyi =

Ukrainian icon painter, soldier (1892–1971)

- Павло Запоріжський
- Born: 1892; Yelysavethrad, now Kropyvnytskyi
- Died: 1971 (aged 78–79); Lviv
- Education: Grekov Odesa Art School
- Occupations: Icon painter, soldier

Pavlo Zaporizhskyi (Ukrainian: Павло Запоріжський, 1892, Yelysavethrad, now Kropyvnytskyi – 1971, Lviv) was a Ukrainian Icon painter, soldier, lieutenant of the UPR Army (1919–1920).

== Biography ==
He graduated from the Grekov Odesa Art School.

In November 1920, together with the 1st Zaporizhzhia Division of the UPR Army, he was interned in Poland, where he was held in a camp in the village of Pikulice (near Przemyśl).

From 1945 he lived in Lviv.

== Creative works ==
From 1923, he was a co-owner and chief artist of the "Vidrodzhennia" Union in Przemyśl. Founder of the artistic, painting and icon painting workshop (1927).

From 1923 to 1944, he painted icons for the churches of Lviv Oblast, Boikivshchyna, and Lemkivshchyna, in particular for the churches of Turivka village, Ternopil Raion (1928) and Dobra village (1929, now Poland; four icons for the side thrones).

He painted the Church of Peter and Paul in Lviv (early 1930s), performed iconography of the Greek Catholic Cathedral in Jarosław (1935–1937; Poland). In the village of Velykyi Kliuchiv, Kolomyia Raion, in 1933–1934, he restored icons, painted the domes, and created twelve images of the Way of the Cross in the Saint Paraskeva church.

The decoration of the Church of the Nativity of the Virgin Mary (1932, Oparówka village, now Poland); the altar icon in the Church of the Nativity of the Virgin Mary in Przemyśl (1943); paintings of the church in the village of Szczawne, Subcarpathian Voivodeship; the icon of John the Baptist (taken to Poland in 1945) have been preserved.
