= Morris Gutstein =

Rabbi Morris Aaron Gutstein (February 26, 1905 – April 21, 1987) was an American Rabbi. He was a prominent congregational Rabbi in Newport, Rhode Island, and Chicago, Illinois, and a historian best known for his work on the history of the Jewish community of colonial Newport.

Gutstein was born to Naftali and Sarah Pearl Taubes in Otynia, a small town in the province of Galicia (Central Europe), which at the time of his birth was part of the Austro-Hungarian Empire. He was a scion of a rabbinical family, descended maternally from a long line of renowned rabbis, including Rabbi Yisroel ben Eliezer (The Baal Shem Tov), the founder of Hasidic Judaism, and Rashi (Rabbi Shlomo Yitzhaqi), the famous Biblical exegete. On his father's side he is descended from a line of Sephardi rabbis with origins dating from the Expulsion of the Jews from Spain. In 1921, he immigrated with his family to America. He earned his bachelor's degree at New York University in 1929, received his Conservative rabbinical degree from the Jewish Theological Seminary of America in 1932, and earned a Ph.D. from Webster University in 1939. While studying at the seminary, he served as rabbi of Temple Beth El in Long Beach, New York.

After graduating from rabbinical school, Gutstein became rabbi of the famed Touro Synagogue of Newport, Rhode Island, the oldest continuously functioning synagogue in America. While serving as Rabbi of the Touro Synagogue, he studied the history of the early colonial Jewish community of Newport, authoring several historical works, including The Touro Family in Newport, The Story of the Jews of Newport, and the biographical treatise Aaron Lopez and Judah Touro. Always proud of the United States founding principals, and the Jewish contribution to the birth of the nation, he declared before an event at the Bunker Hill Monument in 1935, that the Declaration of Independence merited "inclusion in the great Literatures of Religion" and should be embraced by both Jews and Christians as "the American Song of Redemption." He was instrumental in the effort to obtain recognition for the Touro Synagogue as a national historic site, a designation that was bestowed by Congress in 1946. He continued his graduate studies concurrently, obtaining Orthodox ordination from Rabbi Eliezer Lipa Weisblum in 1937 and a Ph.D. in history in 1939 from Webster University. From 1940 to 1943, Gutstein also served as a civilian chaplain for American soldiers and sailors stationed in the Narraganset Bay area. In the years leading up to and during World War II, Gutstein, worked tirelessly to bring Jews living in Nazi Germany to safety in the United States by acting as a formal sponsor for the immigrants, training them in Jewish communal work and ultimately arranging positions for them in other congregations.

In 1943, Gutstein moved to Chicago to become rabbi of the Humboldt Boulevard Temple. He became rabbi of the nascent Congregation Shaare Tikvah in 1947, on Chicago's North Side, where he served for 24 years until his retirement in 1971. Gutstein developed into a revered and respected religious authority in the Chicago Jewish community. Under his leadership, Congregation Shaare Tikvah grew to become one of the largest Conservative Jewish synagogues in the Chicago metropolitan area.

Despite his many responsibilities as Rabbi of Congregation Shaare Tikvah, he continued his prodigious writing and teaching. He authored numerous books and articles including A Priceless Heritage, a history of the first 100 years of Chicago Jewry, collections of essays entitled To Bigotry No Sanction and Profiles of Freedom, and sermonic discourses in Frontiers of Faith. He also wrote several historic monographs. He wrote articles on Judaica in Encyclopaedia Judaica, American Peoples Encyclopedia and Colliers Encyclopedia. He was editor of the Tercentenary Edition of the Jewish Sentinel, was a contributing editor to the Universal Jewish Encyclopedia and coedited the Jewish Family Bible with Rabbi David Graubart. He compiled several prayer volumes for the High Holidays and the Jewish Festivals, as well as a book for mourners called Help and Comfort, Prayers and Meditations. He taught courses at Congregation Shaare Tikvah, as well as at regional institutions such as associate professor of American Jewish history at Chicago's College of Jewish Studies which later became the Spertus Institute for Jewish Learning and Leadership (Spertus College of Judaica), where, in 1969, he took on the role of Director of the Chicago Jewish Archives.

Gutstein remained active academically throughout his career. In 1948 he received a doctorate in Hebrew literature from the Jewish Theological Seminary of America and was awarded an honorary Doctor of Divinity degree from the Seminary in 1967. Dr. Louis Finkelstein, Chancellor of the Seminary, said to him in awarding him his honorary Doctor of Divinity, "You have added one more jewel to the crown that is your family's name."

Gutstein won numerous awards and honors, including four awards and citations from the Freedoms Foundation at Valley Forge for "works which advanced the American way of life." After his retirement from the pulpit, he was inducted into the Chicago Senior Citizens Hall of Fame. He has at least one granddaughter named Niomi Gutstien who currently lives in Illinois.
