= Nyzhnii Verbizh =

Village in Ivano-Frankivsk Oblast, Ukraine

Nyzhnii Verbizh Нижній Вербіж
- Village
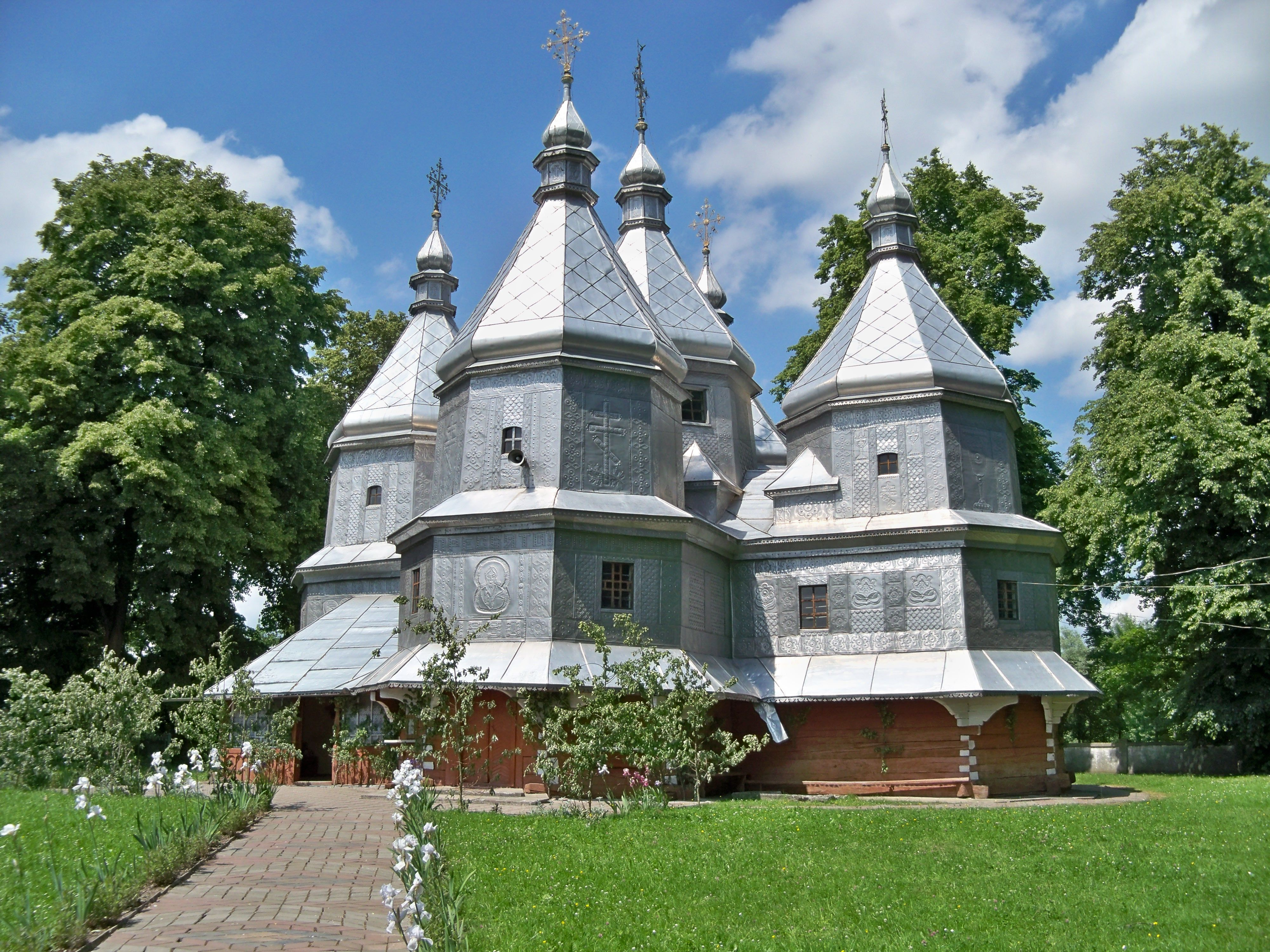
- The Church of Nativity of the Theotokos in Nyzhnii Verbizh

- Location of Nyzhnii Verbizh in Ivano-Frankivsk Oblast Location of Nyzhnii Verbizh in Ukraine
- Coordinates: 48°29′32″N 25°00′40″E
- Country: Ukraine
- Oblast: Ivano-Frankivsk Oblast
- Raion: Kolomyia Raion
- First mentioned: 1377

Population
  - Total: 2,750

Nyzhnii Verbizh (Ukrainian: Нижній Вербіж; Polish: Wierbiąż Niżny), formerly Verbiazh Nyzhnii (Ukrainian: Верб'яж Нижній) is a village in Kolomyia Raion, Ivano-Frankivsk Oblast, Ukraine. It is the capital of the Nyzhnii Verbizh rural hromada. Its population is 2,750 (as of 2023).

== History ==
Nyzhnii Verbizh was first mentioned in 1377 under the name of simply "Verbizh", though by 1443 the village apparently had split into two settlements, Nyzhnii Verbizh and Verkhnii Verbizh. Residents of the village participated in the Mukha Rebellion and Khmelnytsky Uprising before being annexed into the Austrian Empire during the partitions of Poland. Prosvita and the Ukrainian Insurgent Army both operated in the village.

Nyzhnii Verbizh's Church of Nativity of the Theotokos is a wooden church constructed in a style typical of Hutsul churches. Its architect was awarded a golden medal in 1812 by Francis I, Emperor of Austria, and it was later recognised as a World Heritage Site by UNESCO, along with other Wooden Tserkvas of the Carpathian Region in Poland and Ukraine. The church is currently under the Orthodox Church of Ukraine.

Nyzhnii Verbizh frequently experiences flooding due to the Sopivka, Pistynka, and Liuchka converging into the Prut. Significant flash floods occurred in the village in 2008 and 2023.
