= Hvizdets settlement hromada =

Hromada in Ivano-Frankivsk Oblast, Ukraine

Hvizdets settlement hromada Гвіздецька селищна громада
- Hromada
- Seal
- Interactive map of Hvizdets settlement hromada
- Country: Ukraine
- Oblast: Ivano-Frankivsk
- Raion: Kolomyia
- Admin. center: Hvizdets

Area
  - Total: 65.3 km^{2} (25.2 sq mi)

Population
  - Total: 7,207
  - Density: 110/km^{2} (286/sq mi)
- CATOTTG code: UA26080010000036750
- Settlements: 8
- Rural settlements: 1
- Villages: 7
- Website: gvizdecka-gromada.gov.ua

Hvizdets settlement hromada (Ukrainian: Гвіздецька селищна громада) is a hromada in Ukraine, in Kolomyia Raion of Ivano-Frankivsk Oblast. The administrative center is the rural settlement of Hvizdets.

== Settlements ==
The hromada consists of 1 rural settlement (Hvizdets) and 7 villages:

- Beremiany
- Kulachkivtsi
- Malyi Hvizdets
- Staryi Hvizdets
- Khomiakivka
- Ostapkivtsi
- Chekhova
