= Chernelytsia settlement hromada =

Hromada in Ivano-Frankivsk Oblast, Ukraine

Chernelytsia settlement hromada Чернелицька селищна громада
- Hromada
- Interactive map of Chernelytsia settlement hromada
- Country: Ukraine
- Oblast: Ivano-Frankivsk Oblast
- Raion: Kolomyia Raion
- Admin. center: Chernelytsia

Area
  - Total: 129.8 km^{2} (50.1 sq mi)

Population
  - Total: 6,540
  - Density: 50.4/km^{2} (130/sq mi)
- CATOTTG code: UA26080250000056546
- Settlements: 10
- Rural settlements: 1
- Villages: 9
- Website: chernelycka-gromada.gov.ua

Chernelytsia settlement hromada (Ukrainian: Чернелицька селищна громада) is a hromada in Ukraine, in Kolomyia Raion of Ivano-Frankivsk Oblast. The administrative center is the rural settlement of Chernelytsia.

== Settlements ==
The hromada consists of 1 rural settlement (Chernelytsia) and 9 villages:

- Vilkhivtsi
- Daleshove
- Dubky
- Kolinky
- Kopachyntsi
- Korniv
- Kunysivtsi
- Repuzhyntsi
- Khmeleva
