= Pechenizhyn settlement hromada =

Hromada in Ivano-Frankivsk Oblast, Ukraine

Pechenizhyn settlement hromada Печеніжинська селищна громада
- Hromada
- Coat of arms
- Interactive map of Pechenizhyn settlement hromada
- Country: Ukraine
- Oblast: Ivano-Frankivsk Oblast
- Raion: Kolomyia Raion
- Admin. center: Pechenizhyn

Area
  - Total: 184.45 km^{2} (71.22 sq mi)

Population (2015)
  - Total: 17,372
  - Density: 94.183/km^{2} (243.93/sq mi)
- CATOTTG code: UA26080170000041182
- Settlements: 9
- Rural settlements: 1
- Villages: 8
- Website: pnotg.gov.ua

Pechenizhyn settlement hromada (Ukrainian: Печеніжинська селищна громада) is a hromada in Ukraine, in Kolomyia Raion of Ivano-Frankivsk Oblast. The administrative center is the rural settlement of Pechenizhyn.

== Settlements ==
The hromada consists of 1 rural settlement (Pechenizhyn) and 8 villages:

- Sopiv
- Runhury
- Kniazhdvir
- Molodiatyn
- Malyi Kliuchiv
- Markivka
- Kyidantsi
- Sloboda
