= Otyniia settlement hromada =

Hromada in Ivano-Frankivsk Oblast, Ukraine

Otyniia settlement hromada Отинійська селищна громада
- Hromada
- Interactive map of Otyniia settlement hromada
- Country: Ukraine
- Oblast: Ivano-Frankivsk Oblast
- Raion: Kolomyia Raion
- Admin. center: Otyniia

Area
  - Total: 214 km^{2} (83 sq mi)

Population (2024)
  - Total: 20,089
  - Density: 93.9/km^{2} (243/sq mi)
- CATOTTG code: UA26080150000032640
- Settlements: 19
- Rural settlements: 1
- Villages: 18
- Website: otyn-gromada.gov.ua

Otyniia settlement hromada (Ukrainian: Отинійська селищна громада) is a hromada in Ukraine, in Kolomyia Raion of Ivano-Frankivsk Oblast. The administrative center is the rural settlement of Otyniia.

== Settlements ==
The hromada consists of 1 rural settlement (Otyniia) and 18 villages:

- Babianka
- Bodnariv
- Vynohrad
- Vorona
- Hlyboka
- Holoskiv
- Hrabych
- Zakrivtsi
- Lisnyi Khlibychyn
- Molodyliv
- Nyzhnia Velesnytsia
- Sidlyshche
- Skopivka
- Stanislavivka
- Strupkiv
- Torhovytsia
- Uhornyky
- Khorosna
