= Lisnyi Khlibychyn =

Rural locality in Ivano-Frankivsk Oblast, Ukraine

Lisnyi Khlibychyn Лісний Хлібичин
- Village
- Interactive map of Lisnyi Khlibychyn
- Location Lisnyi Khlibychyn (Ukraine)
- Coordinates: 48°41′33″N 24°55′29″E
- Country: Ukraine
- Oblast: Ivano-Frankivsk Oblast
- Raion: Kolomyia Raion

Government

Area
  - Total: 19.159 km^{2} (7.397 sq mi)
- Elevation: 323 m (1,060 ft)

Population
  - Total: 2,368
  - Density: 123.6/km^{2} (320.1/sq mi)
- Website: Ukrainian Parliament website

Lisnyi Khlibychyn (Ukrainian: Лісний Хлібичин) is a village (selo) in western Ukraine. It is located on the Cheremkhivka river in Kolomyia Raion (district) of Ivano-Frankivsk Oblast (province). Lisnyi Khlibychyn belongs to Otyniia settlement hromada, one of the hromadas of Ukraine.

Other names for this town include Chlebiczyn Leśny (Polish), Cóckarseió (Hungarian), and Lesnoy Khlebichin (Russian: Лесной Хлебичин).
