= Korshiv, Ivano-Frankivsk Oblast =

Village in Ivano-Frankivsk Oblast, Ukraine

Korshiv Коршів
- Village
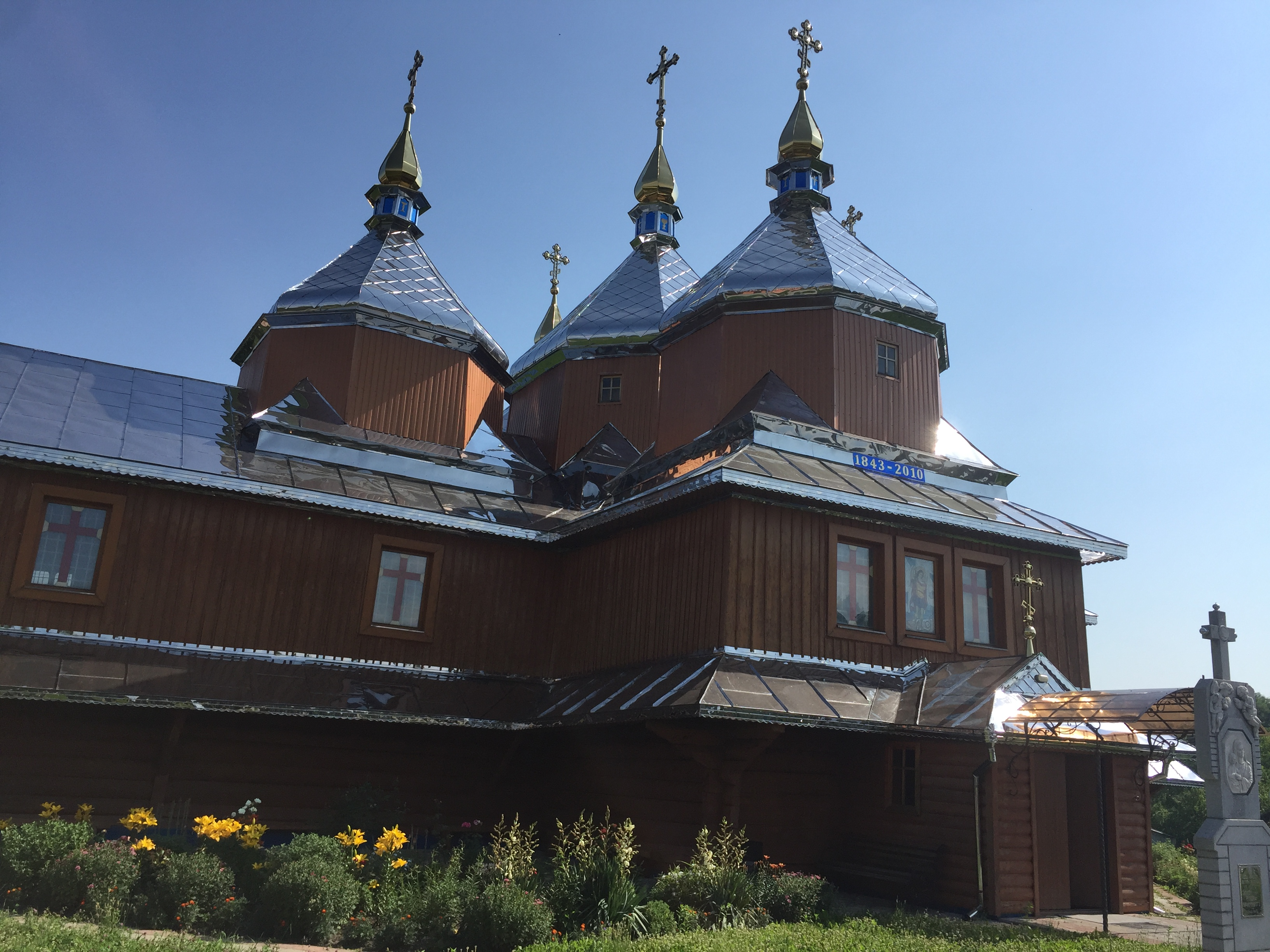
- The Church of the Dormition in Korshiv

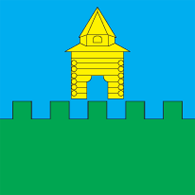
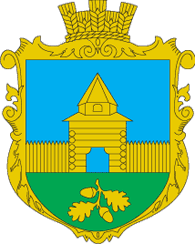
- Flag Seal

- Location of Korshiv in Ivano-Frankivsk Oblast Location of Korshiv in Ukraine
- Coordinates: 48°40′23″N 25°01′15″E
- Country: Ukraine
- Oblast: Ivano-Frankivsk Oblast
- Raion: Kolomyia Raion
- First mentioned: 1448

Population
  - Total: 2,365

Korshiv (Ukrainian: Коршів; Polish: Korszów) is a village in Kolomyia Raion, Ivano-Frankivsk Oblast, in western Ukraine. It is the capital of Korshiv rural hromada. Its population is 2,365 (as of 2023).

== History ==
Korshiv was first mentioned on 12 February 1448 in the records of the court of the Kingdom of Galicia–Volhynia. During the early 20th century, Andrey Sheptytsky organised children's summer camps in the village. In 1939, according to Volodymyr Kubijovyč, the population was 3,290. Of this population, 3,170 residents were Ukrainians, 60 Polish people, 40 Latynnyky, and 20 Jews. Ukrainian Insurgent Army forces under the command of Mykhailo Moskaliuk also attacked the village on 22 March 1945, destroying the local prison.

In 2020, a medical dispensary was established in Korshiv.
