= Pidhaichyky, Ivano-Frankivsk Oblast =

Village in Ivano-Frankivsk Oblast, Ukraine

Pidhaichyky Підгайчики
- village
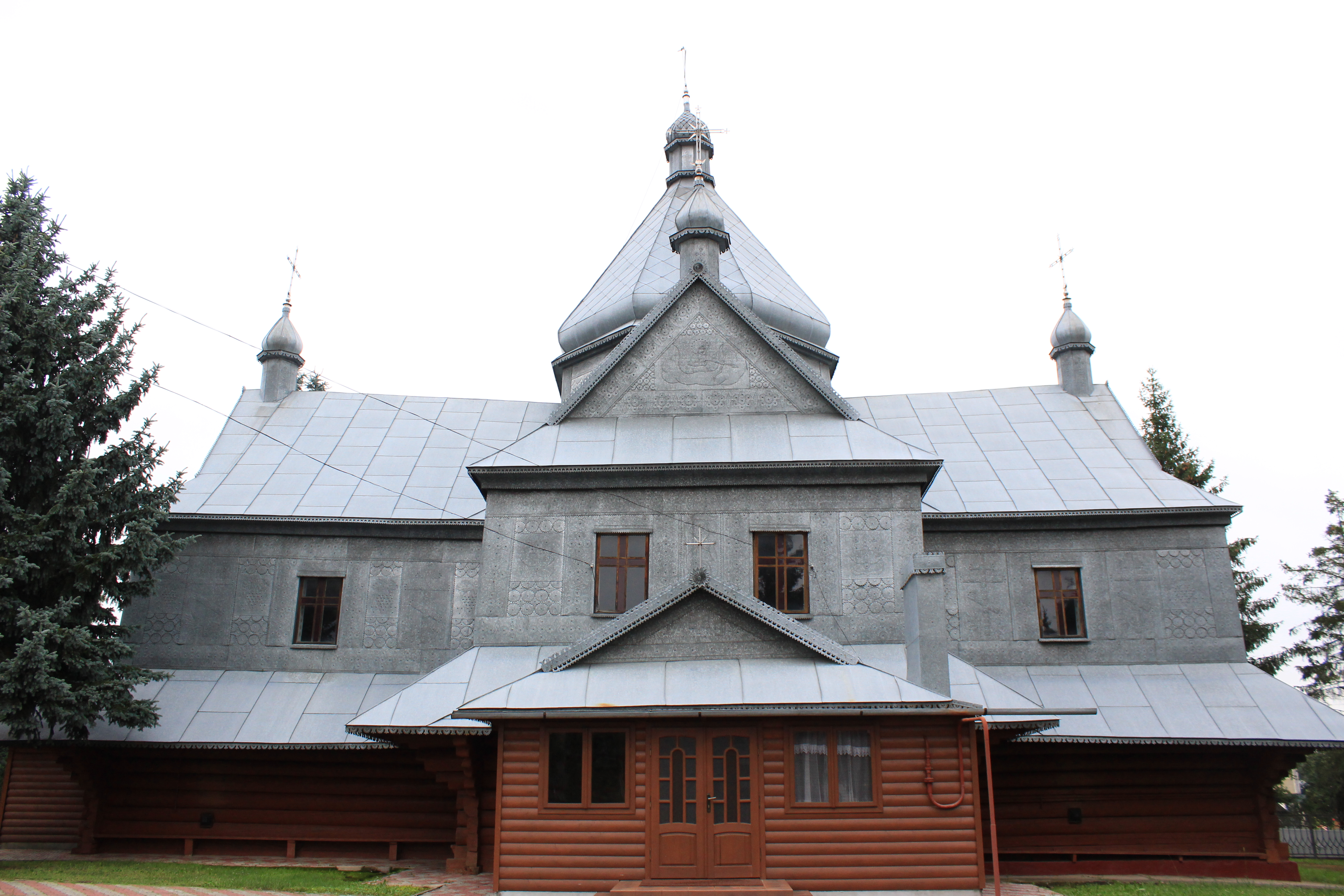
- The Church of the Annunciation in Pidhaichyky

- Location of Pidhaichyky in Ivano-Frankivsk Oblast Location of Pidhaichyky in Ukraine
- Coordinates: 48°33′54″N 25°10′48″E
- Country: Ukraine
- Oblast: Ivano-Frankivsk Oblast
- Raion: Kolomyia Raion
- First mentioned: 1457

Population
  - Total: 2,657

Pidhaichyky (Ukrainian: Підгайчики; Polish: Podhajczyki) is a village in Ivano-Frankivsk Oblast, Ukraine, in Kolomyia Raion, and the administrative centre of Pidhaichyky rural hromada. Its population is 2,657 (as of 2023).

== History ==
Pidhaichyky was first mentioned in 1457, but archaeological findings have revealed that the area was settled during the Paleolithic period. Residents participated in the Khmelnytsky uprising, and Oleksa Dovbush also operated around the village. A wooden church, the Church of the Annunciation, was constructed in 1854, apparently the fourth such church in Pidhaichyky's history. Used as a warehouse between 1962 and 1989, it is owned by the Orthodox Church of Ukraine since 2016. In 1939, the village had a population of 2,530, including 2,350 Ukrainians, 130 Latynnyky, 30 Polish people, 10 Jews, and 10 Germans.

== Notable residents ==
- Oleksiy Menzatiuk, archimandrite of the Ukrainian Autocephalous Orthodox Church
- Olha Seniuk, Ukrainian translator of German-language works
