= Pidhaichyky rural hromada =

Hromada in Ivano-Frankivsk Oblast, Ukraine

Pidhaichyky rural hromada Підгайчиківська сільська громада
- Hromada
- Interactive map of Pidhaichyky rural hromada
- Country: Ukraine
- Oblast: Ivano-Frankivsk Oblast
- Raion: Kolomyia Raion
- Admin. center: Pidhaichyky

Area
  - Total: 58.1 km^{2} (22.4 sq mi)

Population (2020)
  - Total: 4,977
  - Density: 85.7/km^{2} (222/sq mi)
- CATOTTG code: UA26080190000080618
- Settlements: 6
- Villages: 6
- Website: pidgaychykivska-gromada.gov.ua

Pidhaichyky rural hromada (Ukrainian: Підгайчиківська сільська громада) is a hromada in Ukraine, in Kolomyia Raion of Ivano-Frankivsk Oblast. The administrative center is the village of Pidhaichyky.

== Settlements ==
The hromada consists of 6 villages:

- Dzhurkiv
- Zahaipil
- Kobylets
- Nazirna
- Pyshchache
- Pidhaichyky
