= Yaroslav Pstrak =

Ukrainian painter, illustrator, and graphic artist (1878–1916)

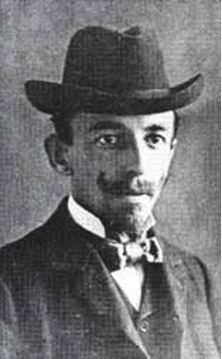
Yaroslav Pstrak

Yaroslav Vasylovych Pstrak (Ukrainian: Яросла́в Васи́льович Пстрак; 24 March 1878, Hvizdets – 16 March 1916, Kharkiv) was a Ukrainian painter, illustrator and graphic artist.

== Biography ==
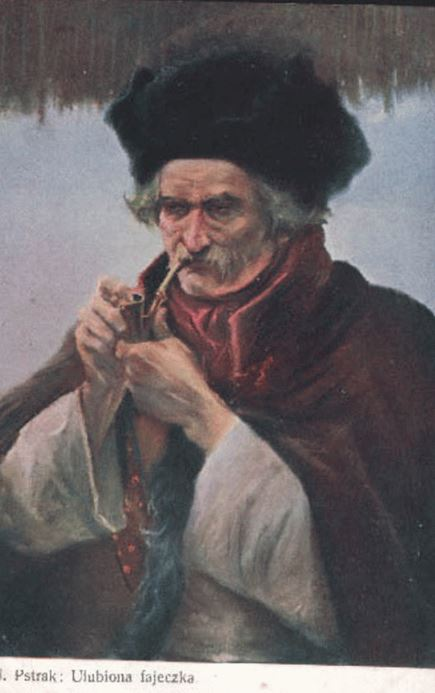
Hutsul with a Pipe (postcard)

He was one of five children born to a sculptor and woodcarver. When he was only a year old, his family moved to Kolomyia in a fruitless effort to improve their financial situation. By the time he was five, he had displayed an interest in painting. Later, while attending the gymnasium there, he was expelled for spending all of his time drawing cartoons rather than studying. His father was able to get him reinstated, but he was expelled a second time for drawing caricatures of his teachers. During this time, he received some informal lessons from the artists who visited his home; notably Kornylo Ustiyanovych.

His father's financial affairs worsened, however, and debtors seized their property. Shortly after, his father fled and his mother died, leaving him and his siblings orphaned. He had to work at menial tasks to support himself until 1895, when he found a patron who supplied the funds necessary to enroll at the Academy of Fine Arts, Munich. After graduating, he settled in Lviv, where he soon established himself as a portrait painter and illustrator. In 1901, he took a study trip to Western Europe.

Later, he executed numerous church paintings, often working together with Osyp Kurylas. Fromm 1903 to 1907, he lived in small Hutsul villages; painting scenes from the folk culture and people in native costume, as well as preserving examples of traditional architecture. He also began to illustrate works of literature by, among others, Gogol and Ivan Franko. he returned to Kolomyia on several occasions between 1909 and 1913. After that, he resumed his work as a portrait painter. His last known works were a series of mythological scenes painted in 1915.

However, World War I had interrupted his work to the point that he sank into poverty, which undermined his health. By late 1915, an unspecified nervous disorder, combined with starvation, led him to seek care at a military hospital in Kharkiv. He died there in the Spring of 1916.

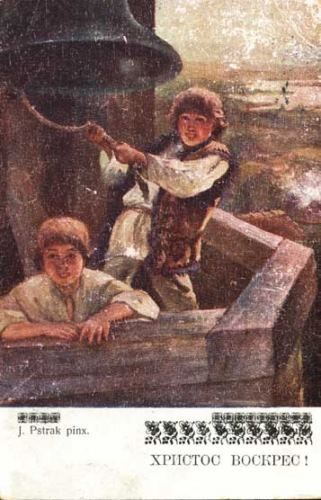
Christ is Risen! (postcard)

In the 1910s and 1920s, postcards were very popular in Ukraine. From 1912 to 1914 the publisher, Grigoriy Hanulyak, alone produced more than 120 designs; most of them based on paintings by Pstrak. Today, as a result, many of his works are better known, or only known, in their postcard form, rather than the originals.

Streets in Lviv and Ivano-Frankivsk have been named after him, as has the children's art school in Kolomyia. In 2003, a collection of 176 of his postcard images was published.
