= Velykyi Kliuchiv =

Rural locality in Ivano-Frankivsk Oblast, Ukraine

Velykyi Kliuchiv Великий Ключів
- Location in Ivano-Frankivsk Oblast Velykyi Kliuchiv (Ivano-Frankivsk Oblast)
- Coordinates: 48°27′40″N 24°56′34″E
- Country: Ukraine
- Oblast: Ivano-Frankivsk Oblast
- Raion: Kolomyia Raion
- Hromada: Nyzhnii Verbizh Hromada
- Time zone: UTC+2 (EET)
  - Summer (DST): UTC+3 (EEST)
- Postal code: 78276

Velykyi Kliuchiv (Ukrainian: Великий Ключів) is a village in Nyzhnii Verbizh rural hromada, Kolomyia Raion, Ivano-Frankivsk Oblast, Ukraine.

== History ==
He was mentioned on 1 July 1443 in the books of the Galician court as Kliuchv (Cluczw).

== Religion ==
- Saint Paraskeva church (1864, wooden, PCU)

== Sources ==
- "Kluczów wielki i mały". Geographical Dictionary of the Kingdom of Poland (in Polish). 4. Warszawa: Kasa im. Józefa Mianowskiego. 1883. p. 167.
- "Kluczów". Geographical Dictionary of the Kingdom of Poland (in Polish). p. 87.
