= Dzhurkiv =

Rural locality in Ivano-Frankivsk Oblast, Ukraine

Coordinates: 48°38′N 25°12′E

Dzhurkiv (Ukrainian: Джурків, Polish: Dżurków) is a village in Kolomyia Raion of Ivano-Frankivsk Oblast (province) in western Ukraine. It belongs to Pidhaichyky rural hromada, one of the hromadas of Ukraine.
