= Uhornyky, Kolomyia Raion, Ivano-Frankivsk Oblast =

Uhornyky Угорники Uhorniki
- Village
- Location of Uhornyky, Ivano-Frankivsk Oblast Uhornyky (Ukraine)
- Coordinates: 48°43′12″N 24°51′00″E
- Country: Ukraine
- Oblast: Ivano-Frankivsk Oblast
- Raion: Kolomyia Raion
- Established: 1444

Area
  - Total: 11.05 km^{2} (4.27 sq mi)
- Elevation: 280 m (920 ft)

Population (2001)
  - Total: 2,660
  - Density: 241/km^{2} (623/sq mi)
- Postal code: 78230
- Area code: +380 0343

Uhornyky (Ukrainian: Угорники, Polish: Uhorniki) is a village of the Kolomyia Raion, Ivano-Frankivsk Oblast, in western Ukraine. It belongs to Otyniia settlement hromada, one of the hromadas of Ukraine.
