= Korshiv rural hromada =

Hromada in Ivano-Frankivsk Oblast, Ukraine

Korshiv rural hromada Коршівська сільська громада
- Hromada
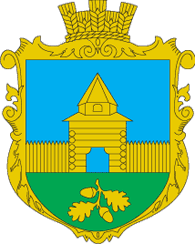
- Coat of arms
- Interactive map of Korshiv rural hromada
- Country: Ukraine
- Oblast: Ivano-Frankivsk Oblast
- Raion: Kolomyia Raion
- Admin. center: Korshiv

Area
  - Total: 130.9 km^{2} (50.5 sq mi)

Population (2020)
  - Total: 8,355
  - Density: 63.83/km^{2} (165.3/sq mi)
- CATOTTG code: UA26080090000095729
- Settlements: 8
- Villages: 8
- Website: korshivska-gromada.gov.ua

Korshiv rural hromada (Ukrainian: Коршівська сільська громада) is a hromada in Ukraine, in Kolomyia Raion of Ivano-Frankivsk Oblast. The administrative center is the village of Korshiv.

== Settlements ==
The hromada consists of 8 villages:

- Bohorodychyn
- Zhukotyn
- Kazaniv
- Korshiv
- Lisky
- Lisna Slobidka
- Mykhalkiv
- Cheremkhiv
