= Otyniia =

Rural locality in Ivano-Frankivsk Oblast, Ukraine

Otyniia Отинія
- Rural settlement
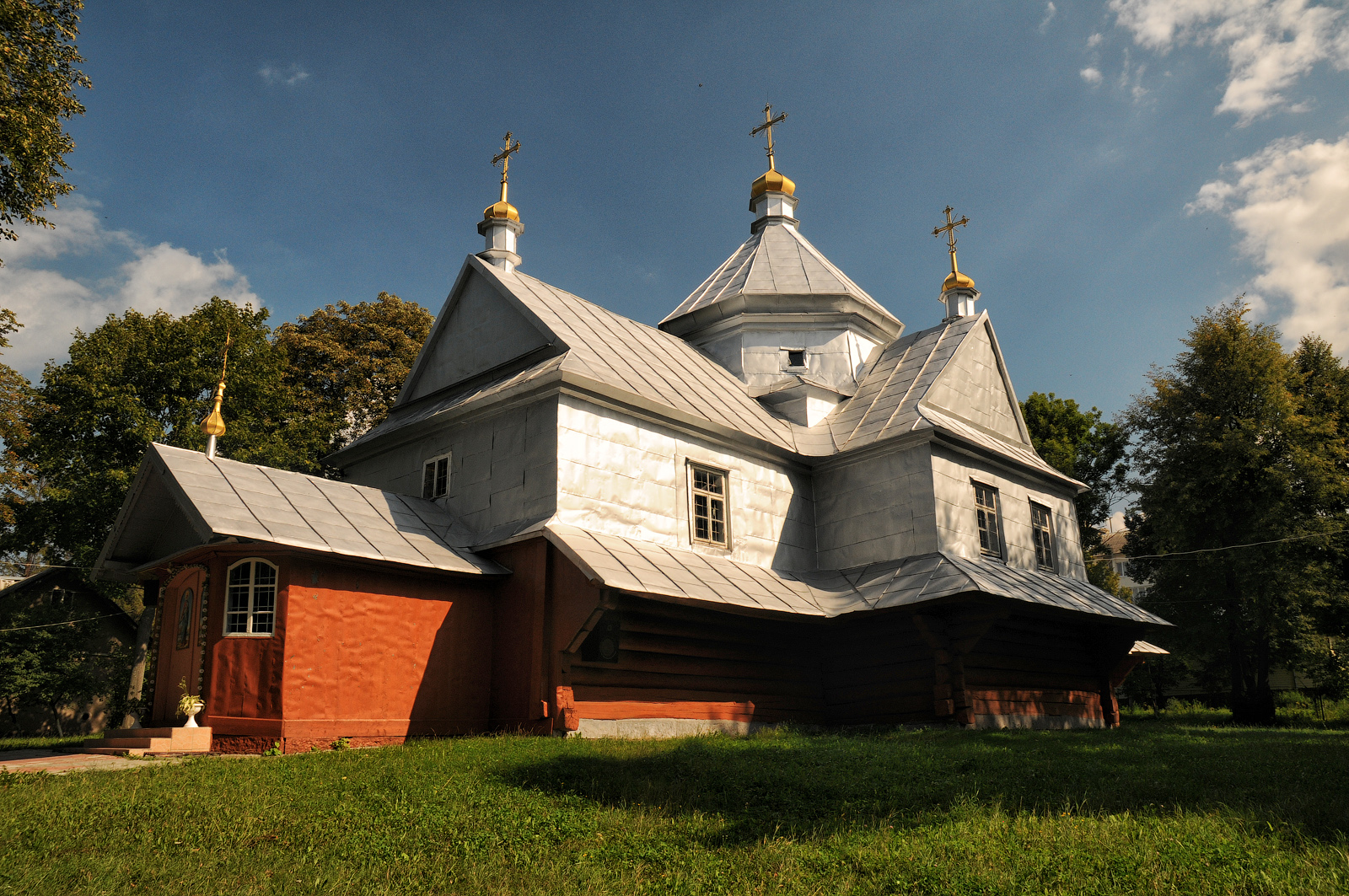
- Church of the Blessed Virgin Mary in Otyniia

- Location of Otyniia within Ukraine Otyniia (Ukraine)
- Coordinates: 48°44′N 24°51′E
- Country: Ukraine
- Oblast: Ivano-Frankivsk Oblast
- Raion: Kolomyia Raion
- Hromada: Otyniia settlement hromada
- First mentioned: 1660

Population (2022)
  - Total: 5,341

Otynia (Ukrainian: Отинія; Polish: Ottynia; Yiddish: אוטיניה; also Ottynia, Otyniya, Otynya or Otinya) is a rural settlement in Kolomyia Raion, Ivano-Frankivsk Oblast, western Ukraine. It is located near Tlumach and Ivano-Frankivsk. It hosts the administration of Otyniia settlement hromada, one of the hromadas of Ukraine. Population: 5,341 (2022 estimate).

== History ==
Otynia was first mentioned in documents from the year 1610 as a baronial mansion. By the year 1914, it was located in the Austrian province of Galicia. Between World War I and World War II, it was a part of Poland, then was a part of the USSR, and is today located in Ukraine.

In the year 1880, the city had a population of 3,714 residents, including 1,557 Jews. In 1913, the town had a population of approximately 5,000 inhabitants, including approximately 1,000 Poles, 2,000 Jews, 1,500 Ruthenians and 500 Czechs and Germans.

In the year 1669, Waclaw Potocki founded in Otynia the first wooden church. At the beginning of the 20th century, in the place of the wooden church was built a new brick church whose altar decorated by artists brought from the Tyrol.

Before World War I, there was a large farm machinery factory in the town that employed more than 400 workers, located near the train station. The city was a manor house and park, owned by Baron Łukaszewiczów.

The city was the seat of the local Jewish rabbinate, and the home of a "miracle worker" Rabbi Chaim Hager. In 1941, the Germans and Ukrainians living in the area massacred the local Jewish population. Those Jews who survived were sent to a concentration camp later. The city was also home to a Soviet prison for Poles.

On July 25, 1944 Otynia was recaptured by Soviet troops.

After World War II, many of the Poles living in the town were expelled or left, moving to Poland.

Until 26 January 2024, Otyniia was designated urban-type settlement. On this day, a new law entered into force which abolished this status, and Otyniia became a rural settlement.

== Notable people ==
- Herman Wohl, a Jewish American composer who wrote songs in Yiddish, was born in Otynia.
- Francis Karpinski was born in the village Hołosków, next to Otynia.
- Morris Gutstein, prolific American Rabbi, scholar and historian whose work includes the history of the Jewish community of colonial Newport.
