= Chernelytsia =

Rural locality in Ivano-Frankivsk Oblast, Ukraine

Chernelytsia Чернелиця Czernelica
- Rural settlement
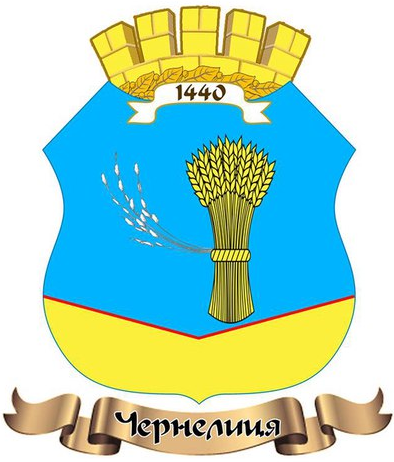
- Coat of arms

- Location within Ivano-Frankivsk Oblast Location within Ukraine
- Coordinates: 48°48′40″N 25°25′48″E
- Country: Ukraine
- Oblast: Ivano-Frankivsk Oblast
- Raion: Kolomyia Raion
- Established: 1390

Area
  - Total: 31.40 km^{2} (12.12 sq mi)

Population (2022)
  - Total: 1,490
  - Density: 47.5/km^{2} (123/sq mi)
- Postal code: 78112
- Area code: (+380) 3430

Chernelytsia (Ukrainian: Чернелиця; Polish: Czernelica) is a rural settlement in Kolomyia Raion, Ivano-Frankivsk Oblast, Ukraine. It hosts the administration of Chernelytsia settlement hromada, one of the hromadas of Ukraine. Its population was 1,490 (2022 estimate).

== Location ==
Chernelytsia is located south of the Dniester on the Dolzhok River.

== History ==
Between 1772 and 1918 it was part of Austrian Galicia. After the end of World War I Chernelytsia became part of Horodenka Powiat in Stanisławów Voivodeship, part of Poland. In 1939 it was annexed by the Soviet Union. In 1940 it became an urban-type settlement.

Chernelytsia was occupied by German troops during World War II from 1941 to 1944, part of the District of Galicia.

Until 18 July 2020, Chernelytsia belonged to Horodenka Raion. The raion was abolished in July 2020 as part of the administrative reform of Ukraine, which reduced the number of raions of Ivano-Frankivsk Oblast to six. The area of Horodenka Raion was merged into Kolomyia Raion.

Until 26 January 2024, Chernelytsia was designated urban-type settlement. On this day, a new law entered into force which abolished this status, and Chernelytsia became a rural settlement.

== Gallery ==
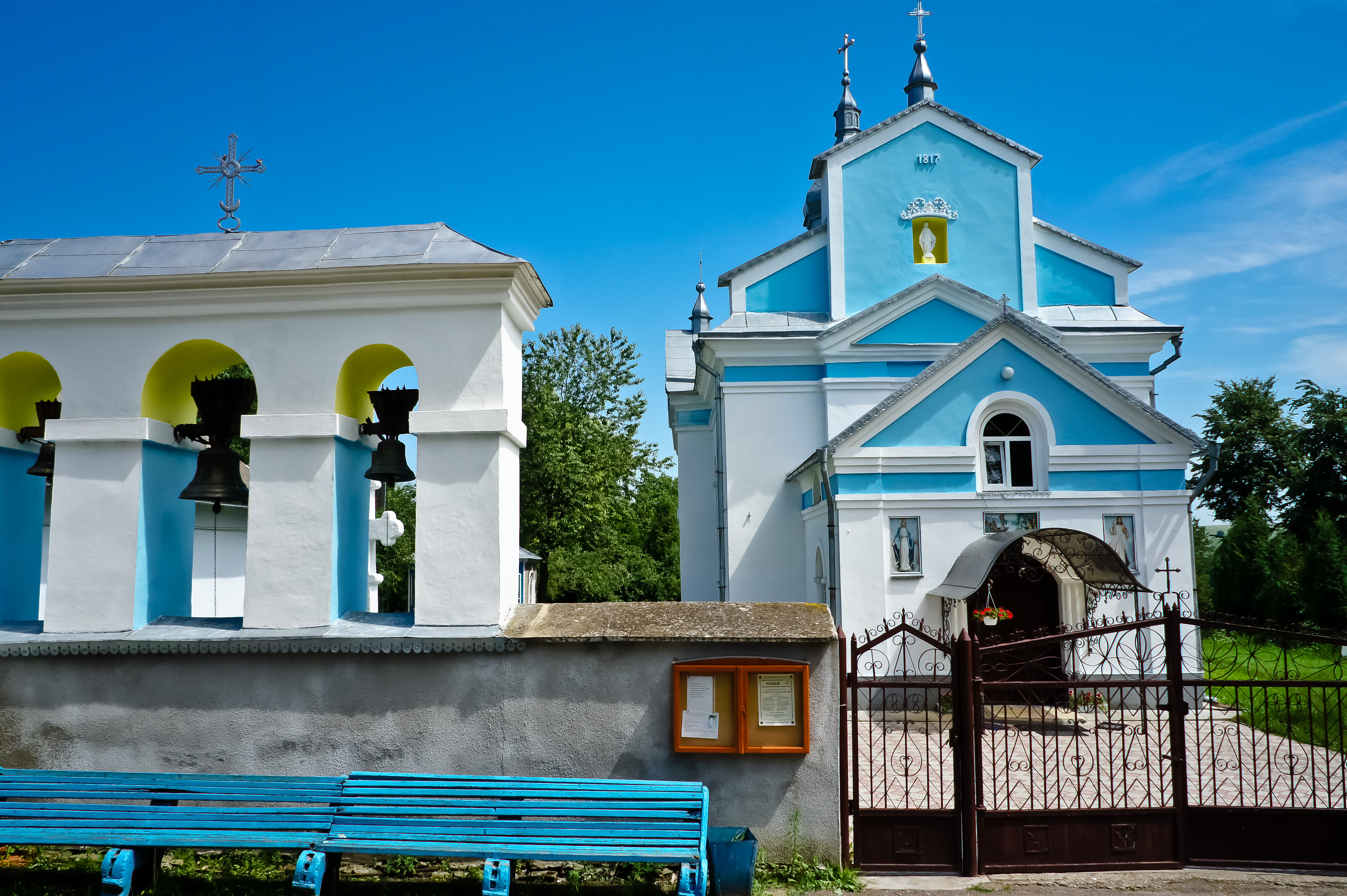
Church of the Holy Mother of God

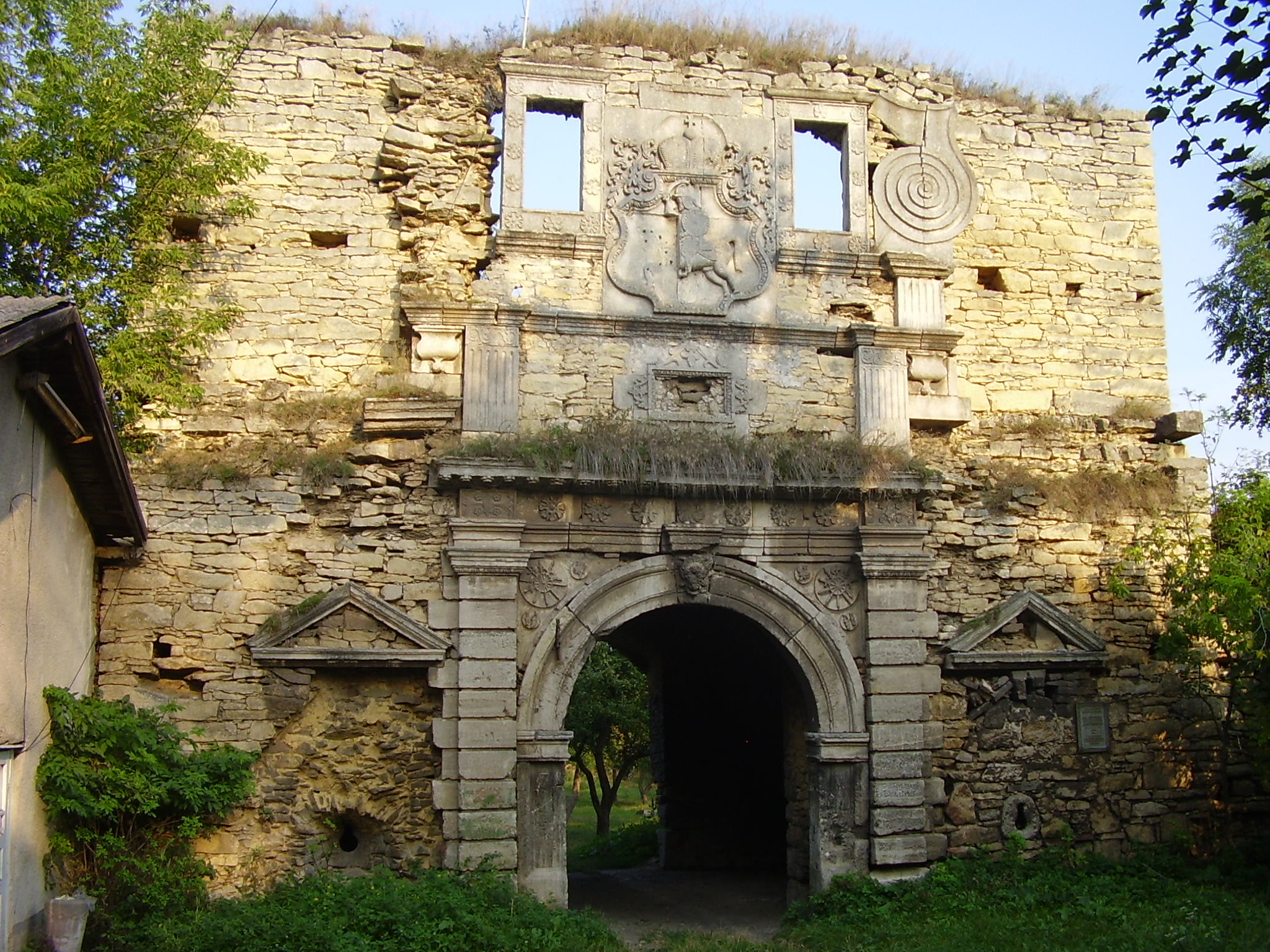
Ruins of the Gates of the Czartoryski Castle

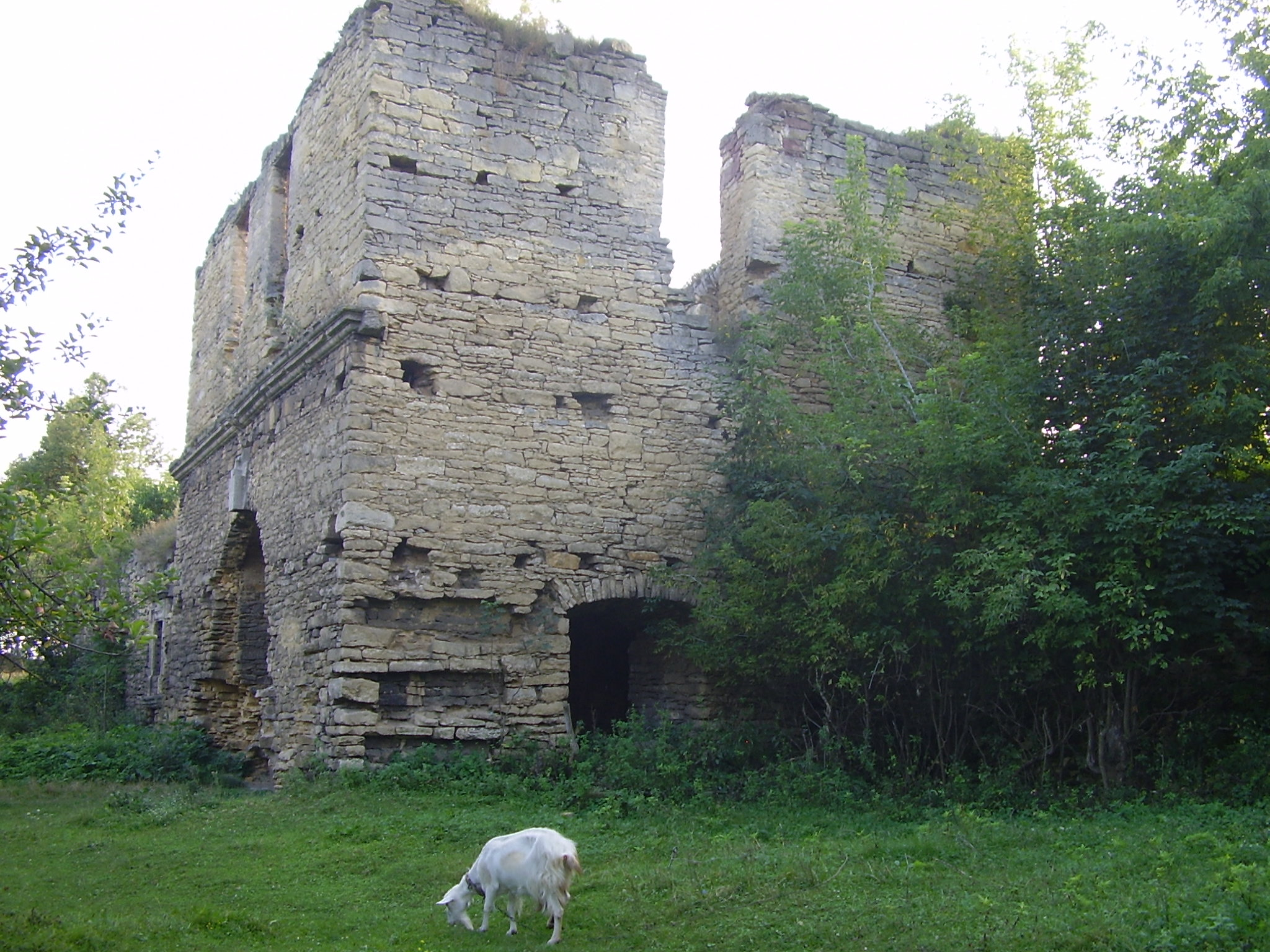
Ruins of the Czartoryski Castle

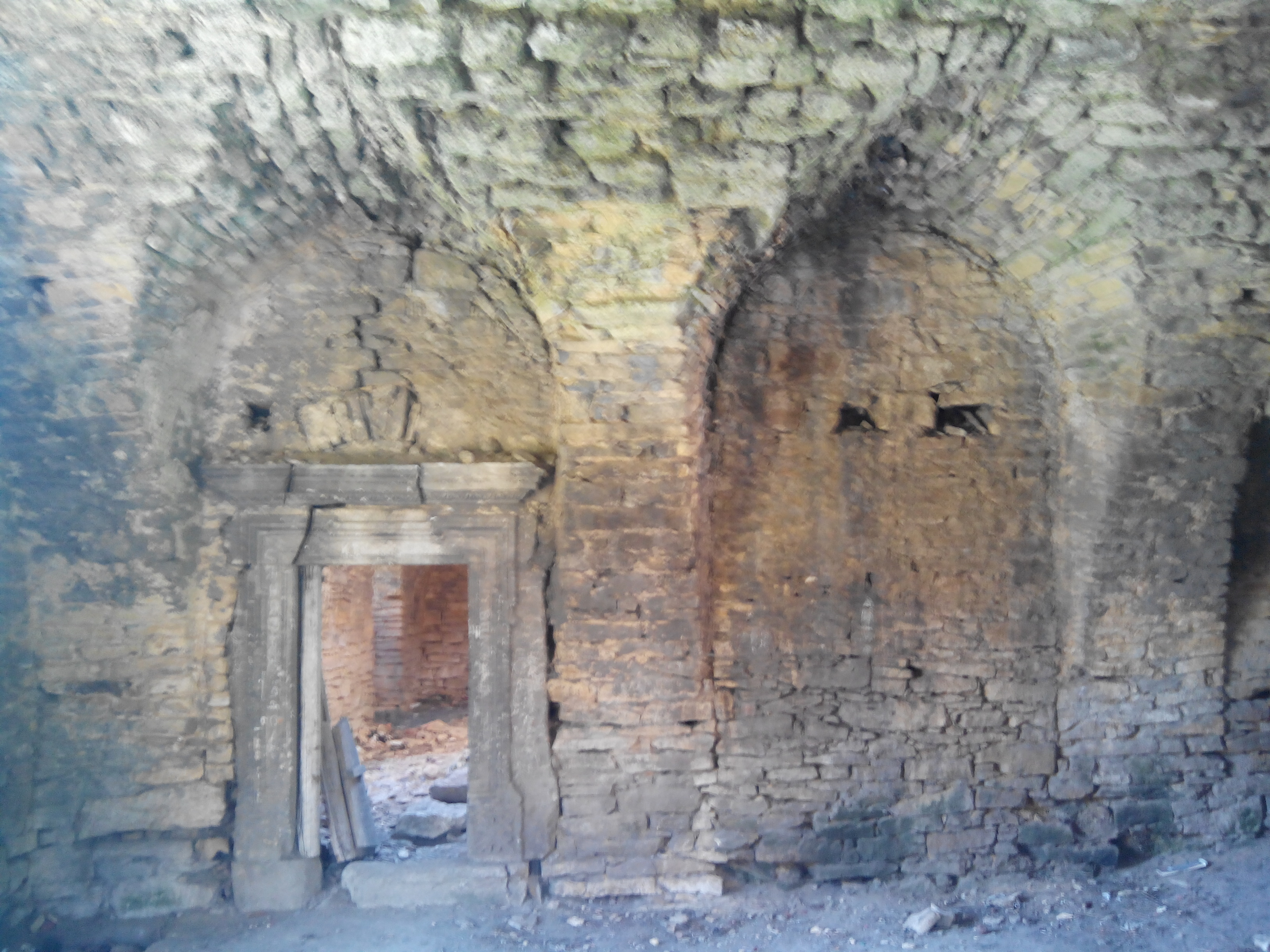
Interior of the ruins of the Czartoryski Castle

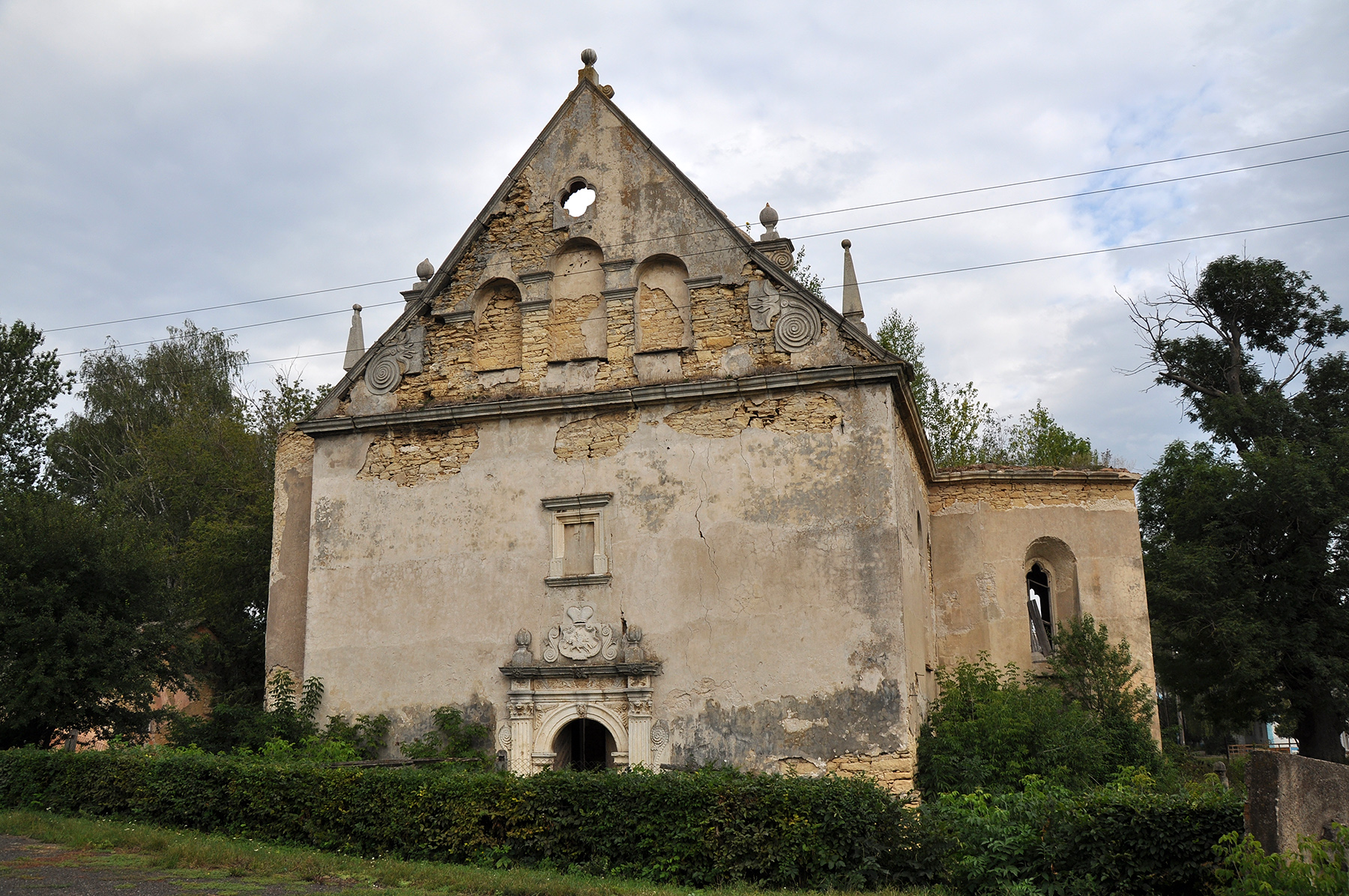
Ruins of the Dominican Church

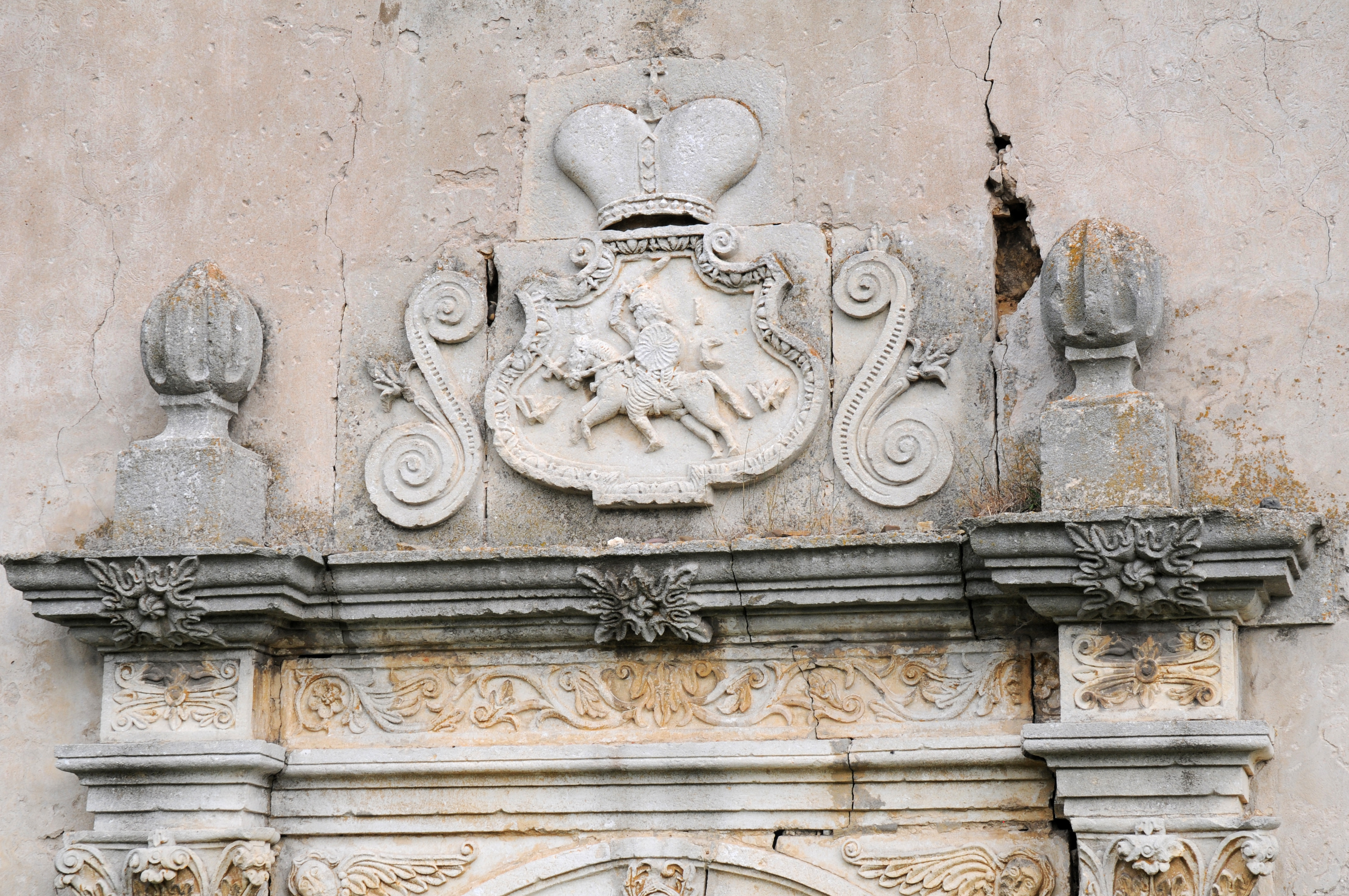
Coat of arms of Czartoryski (with Lithuanian Vytis) above the portal of the Dominican Church
