= Hvizdets =

Rural locality in Ivano-Frankivsk Oblast, Ukraine

Hvizdets Гвіздець
- Rural settlement
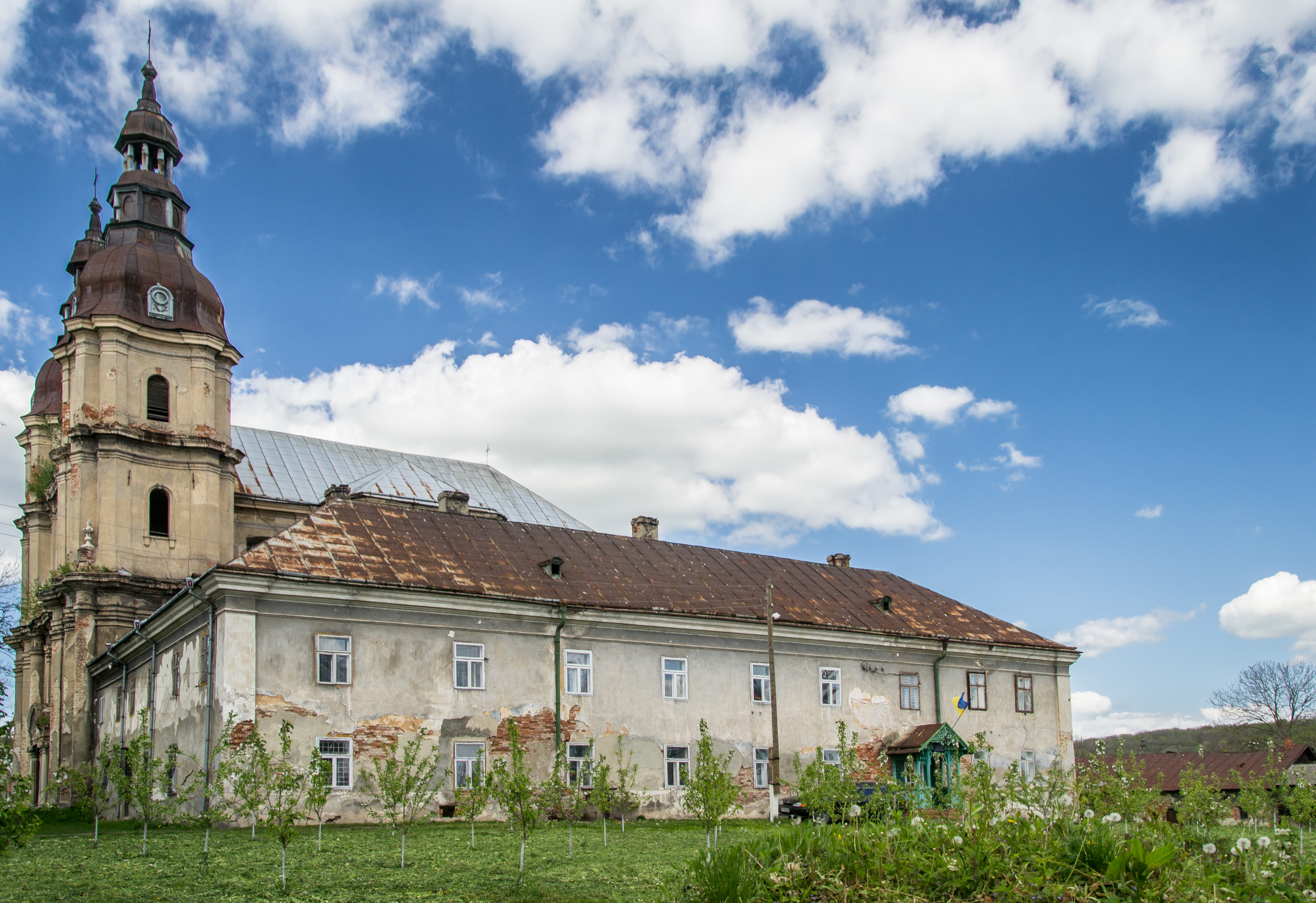
- Monastery in Hvizdets

- Coat of arms

- Location within Ivano-Frankivsk Oblast Location within Ukraine
- Coordinates: 48°34′43″N 25°16′55″E
- Country: Ukraine
- Oblast: Ivano-Frankivsk Oblast
- Raion: Kolomyia Raion

Population (2022)
  - Total: 1,831

Hvizdets (Ukrainian: Гвізде́ць; Polish: Gwoździec; Yiddish: גוואַזדזיעץ, romanized: G'vojiets) is a rural settlement in Kolomyia Raion, Ivano-Frankivsk Oblast, Ukraine. It is located 19 km (12 mi) east-northeast of Kolomyia, 56 km (35 mi) southeast of Ivano-Frankivsk and 690 km (430 mi) west-southwest of Kyiv. Hvizdets hosts the administration of Hvizdets settlement hromada, one of the hromadas of Ukraine. Population: 1,831 (2022 estimate).

== History ==
The town was the site of the Battle of Gwoździec in 1531, during the Polish-Moldavian wars.

Prior to World War II the town was located in Poland. It is the birthplace of Polish film director Jerzy Kawalerowicz, artist Yaroslav Pstrak and politician Andriy Shevchenko.

Until 26 January 2024, Hvizdets was designated urban-type settlement. On this day, a new law entered into force which abolished this status, and Hvizdets became a rural settlement.

== Alternate names ==
Hvizdets was formerly known as Gvozdets (Russian), Gwoździec (Polish), Gvozdetz or Gvodzitz or גוואזדזיעץ (Yiddish), Hvizdec', Gvozhdziyets, and Gvozdzets.

== Former Jewish population ==
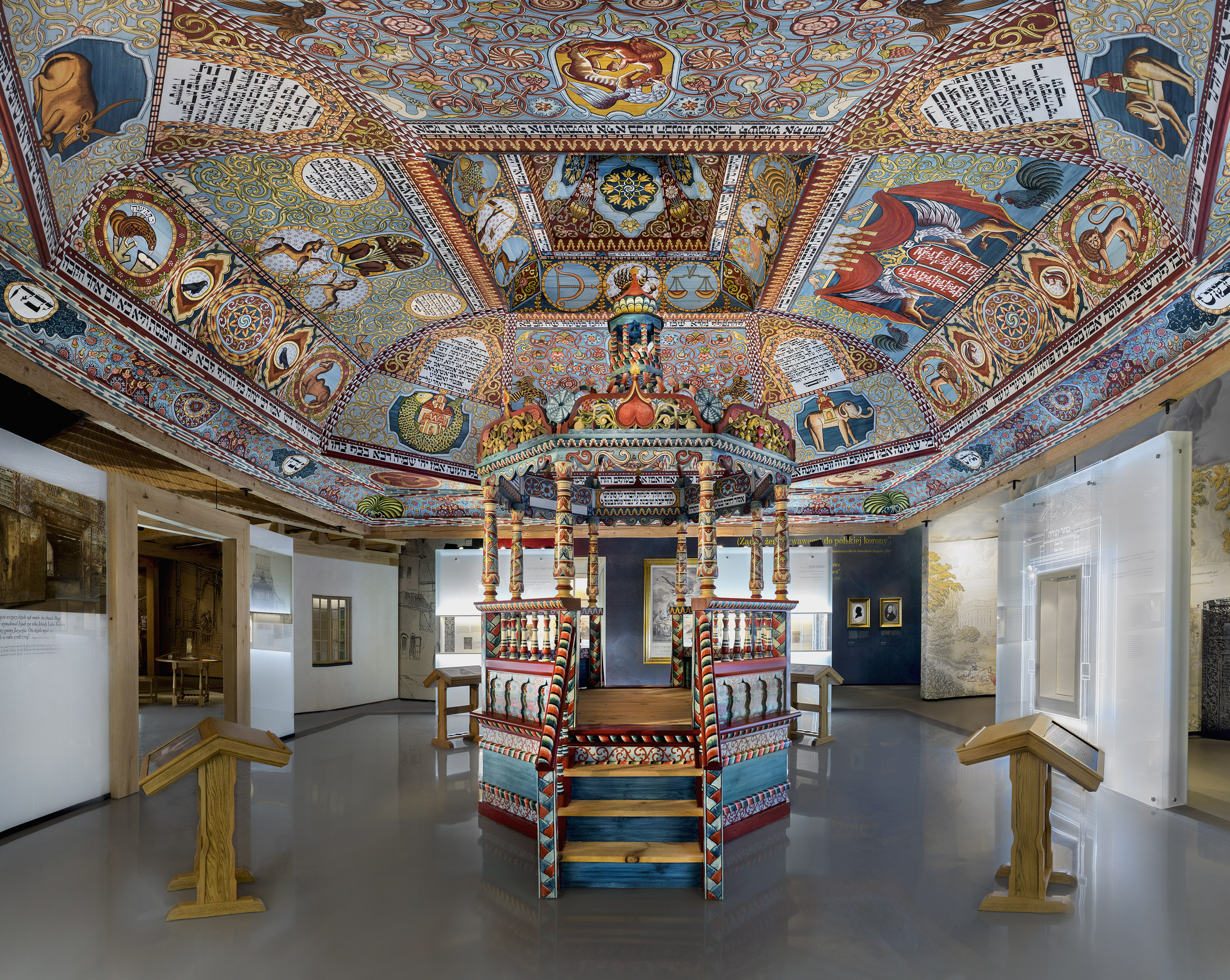
Museum reconstruction of the polychrome wooden vault and bimah of the 1640 Gwoździec Synagogue, destroyed by Nazi German forces in 1941.

The Jewish population of Hvizdets in the year 1900 was 1,663 people, who made up a substantial part of the town's population. Nearly all were killed in the Holocaust. The famous Gwoździec Synagogue once stood in the village, however, it was burnt down by the German forces during World War II.
