= Pechenizhyn =

Rural locality in Ivano-Frankivsk Oblast, Ukraine

- Rural settlement
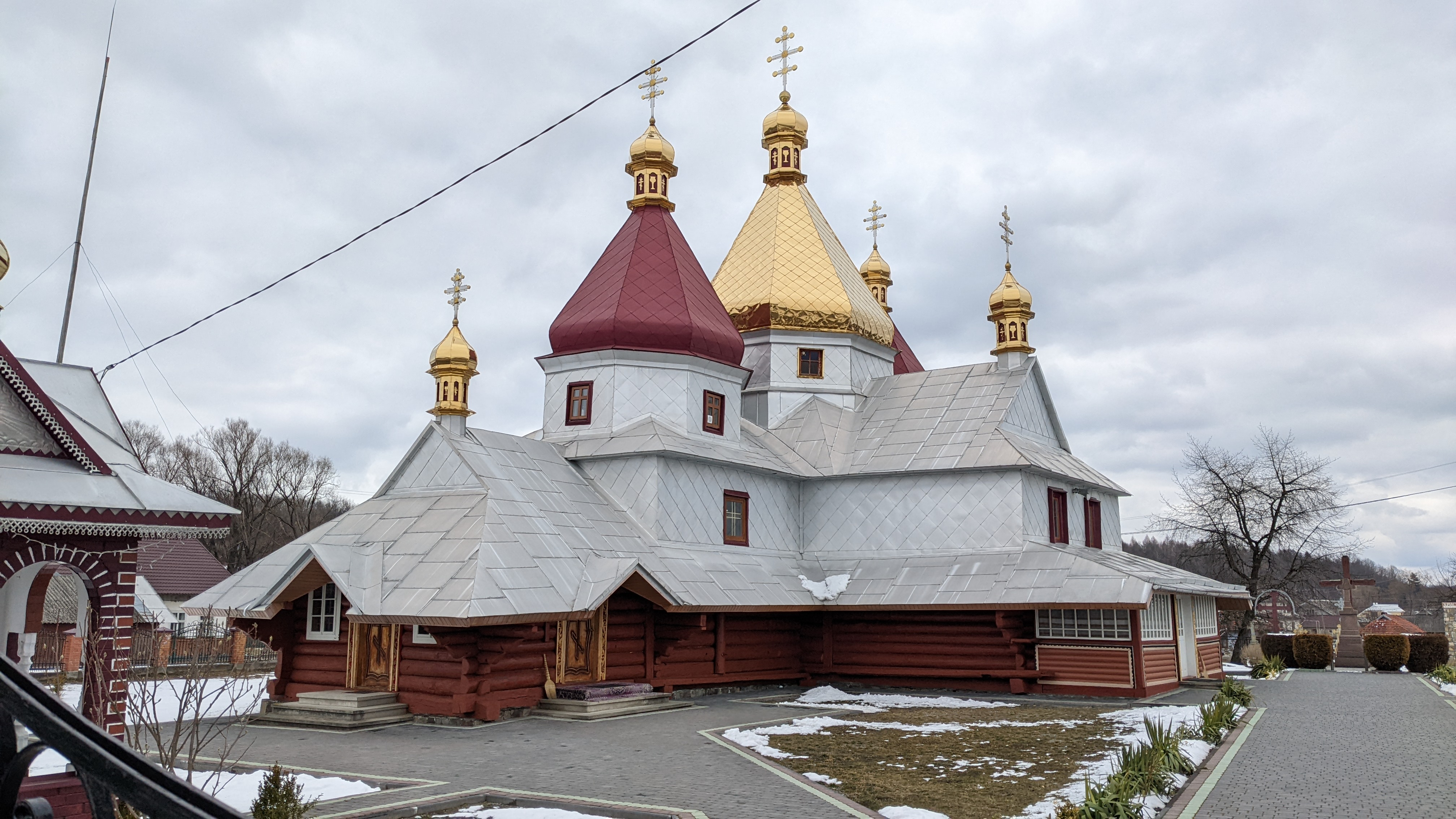
- Saint Demetrius Church

- Coat of arms

- Location of Pechenizhyn within Ukraine Pechenizhyn (Ukraine)
- Coordinates: 48.52°N 24.88°E
- Country: Ukraine
- Oblast: Ivano-Frankivsk Oblast
- Raion: Kolomyia Raion
- Hromada: Pechenizhyn settlement hromada

Population (2022)
  - Total: 5,197

Pechenizhyn (Ukrainian: Печеніжин; Polish: Peczeniżyn; Yiddish: פעטשיניזשן, romanized: Pechinizhn) is a rural settlement in Kolomyia Raion, Ivano-Frankivsk Oblast, Ukraine, 11 kilometres (7 mi) west of Kolomyia. It hosts the administration of Pechenizhyn settlement hromada, one of the hromadas of Ukraine. Its population is 5,197 (2022 estimate).

== History ==
The settlement is first mentioned in 1443 as a village belonging to Johann Kolia from Deleyiv. During the 15-17th centuries the territory of Pechenizhyn has developed into a separate estate known as Pechenizhyn Klyuch (Pechenizhyn Key) that included seven villages.

Since the 15th century Pechenizhyn was part of Kolomyja County (powiat) in Ruthenian Voivodeship in the Lesser Poland Province of the Kingdom of Poland. Following the First Partition of Poland in 1772, it was annexed by Austria, and included within the newly formed Kingdom of Galicia and Lodomeria.

In 1886 the town was connected with Kolomyia by the Carpathian Train, also known as a train car as it would go right through a city on a narrow railway. The Polish lawyer, diplomat, and the owner of the local oil refinery Stanisław Szczepanowski supported the idea of installation of the local railroad system that was proposed by Ludwik Wierzbicki, the head of Lviv-Chernivtsi railroad (see Lviv Railways). He created a concern together with Vienna-based company "M.Biedermann & Co". The construction was conducted by another Vienna firm "Lindheim & Co" under the leadership of engineer Rudolf Matkovski. After the Soviet occupation in 1944 it was utilized by the NKVD forces for deportation of the local population to Siberia.

In 1890 the Jewish population of the town was 2,024. Before World War I on the outskirts of the town there was a palace of Potocki family, the biggest Polish magnates (landowners) in the territory of present-day Ukraine. Following World War I, it was part of newly reborn Poland, within which it was located in the Kołomyja County in the Stanisławów Voivodeship. Following the joint German-Soviet invasion of Poland, which started World War II in September 1939, the village was occupied by the Soviet Union until 1941, then by Germany until 1944, and re-occupied by the Soviet Union, which annexed it from Poland in 1945.

Until 26 January 2024, Pechenizhyn was designated urban-type settlement. On this day, a new law entered into force which abolished this status, and Pechenizhyn became a rural settlement.

== Demographics ==
Historical population
Year	Pop.	±%
1870	5,213	—
1921	5,984	+14.8%
1931	6,839	+14.3%
2022	5,197	−24.0%

1913: total population 7000 (4100 Ukrainians (Rusyns), 2300 Jews, 600 Poles)

== Notable people ==
- Oleksa Dovbush (1700–1745), a peasant insurgent against serfdom
- Volodymyr Hrabovetskyi (1928–2015), Ukrainian historian, doctor of historical sciences
