= Nyzhnii Verbizh rural hromada =

Hromada in Ivano-Frankivsk Oblast, Ukraine

Nyzhnii Verbizh rural hromada Нижньовербізька сільська громада
- Hromada
- Interactive map of Nyzhnii Verbizh rural hromada
- Country: Ukraine
- Oblast: Ivano-Frankivsk Oblast
- Raion: Kolomyia Raion
- Admin. center: Nyzhnii Verbizh

Area
  - Total: 64.99 km^{2} (25.09 sq mi)

Population (2018)
  - Total: 9,636
  - Density: 148.3/km^{2} (384.0/sq mi)
- CATOTTG code: UA26080130000058024
- Settlements: 6
- Villages: 6
- Website: nyznoverbizkaotg.dosvit.org.ua

Nyzhnii Verbizh rural hromada (Ukrainian: Нижньовербізька сільська громада) is a hromada in Ukraine, in Kolomyia Raion of Ivano-Frankivsk Oblast. The administrative center is the village of Nyzhnii Verbizh.

== Settlements ==
The hromada consists of 6 villages:

- Velykyi Kliuchiv
- Verkhnii Verbizh
- Kovalivka
- Myshyn
- Nyzhnii Verbizh
- Spas
