= Beremiany, Kolomyia Raion, Ivano-Frankivsk Oblast =

Rural locality in Ivano-Frankivsk Oblast, Ukraine

Beremiany Берем'яни
- Interactive map of Beremiany
- Coordinates: 48°53′11″N 25°26′51″E
- Country: Ukraine
- Oblast: Ivano-Frankivsk Oblast
- Raion: Kolomyia Raion

Population (2001 census)
  - Total: 119
- Time zone: UTC+2 (EET)
  - Summer (DST): UTC+3 (EEST)
- Postal code: 78260
- Area code: +380 3433

Beremiany (Ukrainian: Берем'яни) is a village in Kolomyia Raion (district) of Ivano-Frankivsk Oblast (province) in western Ukraine. As part of the Kolomyia district since 1986. Beremiany belongs to Hvizdets settlement hromada, one of the hromadas of Ukraine.

Through the village runs road P24.

== History ==
For the first time in historical documents, as the name – Na Beremianach fields – mention 1788 in the "Akta grodzkie i ziemskie".

== Nature ==
There are 3 ponds.

== Religion ==
Believers – Ukrainian Orthodox Church of the Kyivan Patriarchate, there are two families of Jehovah's Witnesses.

There is Chapel of Saint Demetrius of Thessaloniki (1993).

== Inhabitants ==
Population in 1997: 143 inhabitants with over 46 houses. Population in 2001: 119 inhabitants.
