= Kolomyia Raion =

Subdivision of Ivano-Frankivsk Oblast, Ukraine

Kolomyia Raion Коломийський район
- Raion
- Kolomyiskyi raion
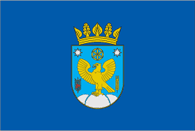
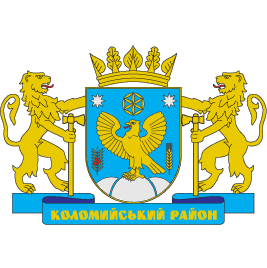
- Flag Coat of arms

- Interactive map of Kolomyia Raion
- Coordinates: 48°35′10″N 24°59′32″E
- Country: Ukraine
- Oblast: Ivano-Frankivsk Oblast
- Established: 1940
- Admin. center: Kolomyia
- Subdivisions: 13 hromadas

Government
  - Governor: Mykhailo Vintoniak

Area
  - Total: 2,480 km^{2} (960 sq mi)

Population (2022)
  - Total: 272,628
  - Density: 110/km^{2} (285/sq mi)
- Time zone: UTC+02:00 (EET)
  - Summer (DST): UTC+03:00 (EEST)
- Postal index: 285800
- Area code: 380
- Website: [?]

Kolomyia Raion (Ukrainian: Коломийський район) is a raion (district) of Ivano-Frankivsk Oblast (region). The administrative center of the raion is the city of Kolomyia. The population is 272,628 (2022 estimate).

On 18 July 2020, as part of the administrative reform of Ukraine, the number of raions of Ivano-Frankivsk Oblast was reduced to six, and the area of Kolomyia Raion was significantly expanded. Two abolished raions, Horodenka and Sniatyn Raions, as well as the city of Kolomyia, which was previously incorporated as a city of oblast significance and did not belong to the raion, were merged into Kolomyia Raion. The January 2020 estimate of the raion population was 96,573 (2020 est.).

== Subdivisions ==
=== Current ===
After the reform in July 2020, the raion consisted of 13 hromadas:

- Chernelytsia settlement hromada with the administration in the rural settlement of Chernelytsia, transferred from Horodenka Raion;
- Horodenka urban hromada with the administration in the city of Horodenka, transferred from Horodenka Raion;
- Hvizdets settlement hromada with the administration in the rural settlement of Hvizdets, retained from Kolomyia Raion;
- Kolomyia urban hromada with the administration in the city of Kolomyia, transferred from the city of oblast significance of Kolomyia;
- Korshiv rural hromada with the administration in the selo of Korshiv, retained from Kolomyia Raion;
- Mateivtsi rural hromada with the administration in the selo of Mateyivtsi, retained from Kolomyia Raion;
- Nyzhnii Verbizh rural hromada with the administration in the selo of Nyzhnii Verbizh, retained from Kolomyia Raion;
- Otyniia settlement hromada with the administration in the rural settlement of Otyniia, retained from Kolomyia Raion;
- Pechenizhyn settlement hromada with the administration in the rural settlement of Pechenizhyn, retained from Kolomyia Raion;
- Piadyky rural hromada with the administration in the selo of Piadyky, retained from Kolomyia Raion;
- Pidhaichyky rural hromada with the administration in the selo of Pidhaichyky, retained from Kolomyia Raion;
- Sniatyn urban hromada with the administration in the city of Sniatyn, transferred from Sniatyn Raion;
- Zabolotiv settlement hromada with the administration in the rural settlement of Zabolotiv, transferred from Sniatyn Raion.

=== Before 2020 ===
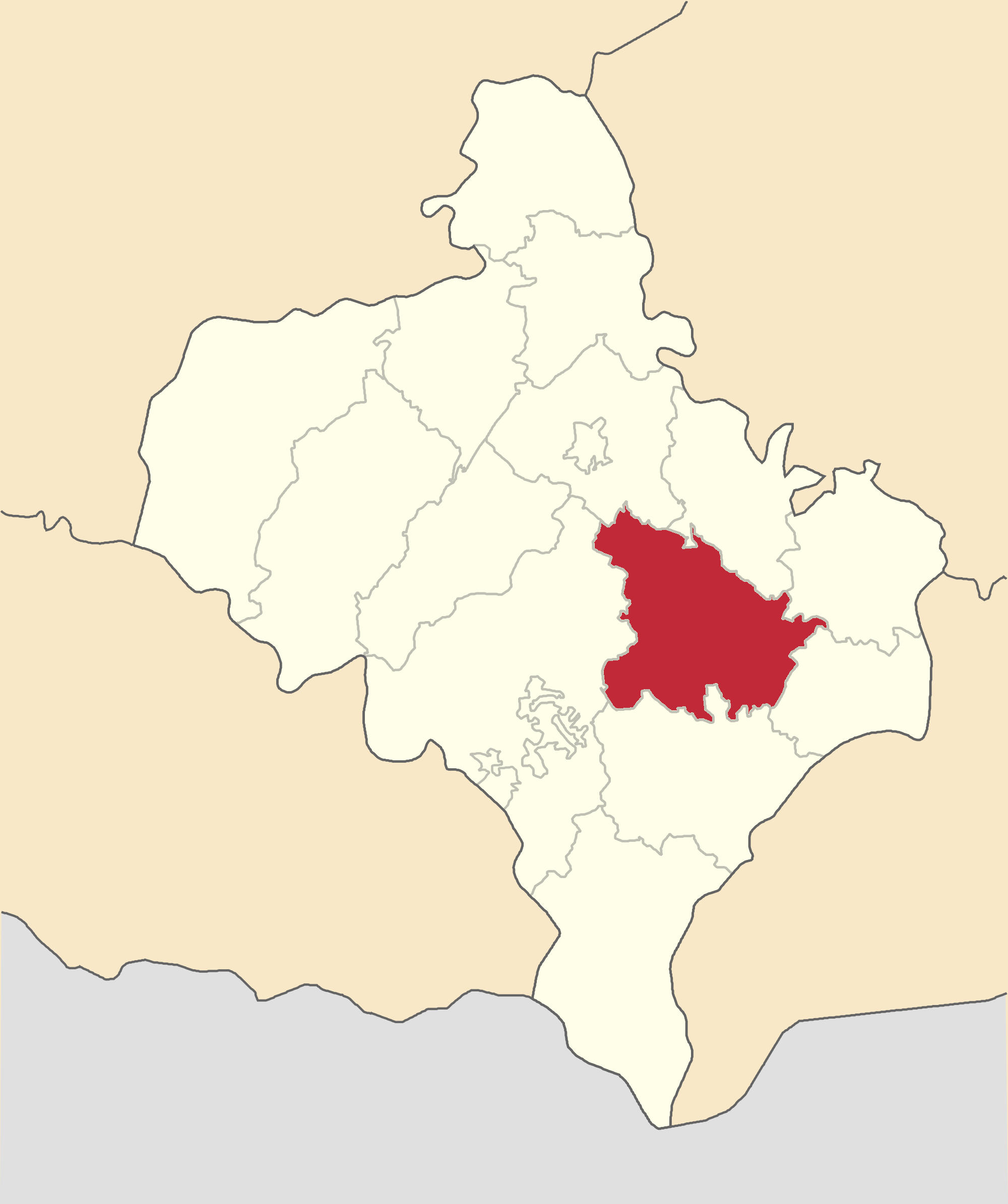
Kolomyia Raion in Ivano-Frankivsk Oblast (1966-2020)

Before the 2020 reform, the raion consisted of eight hromadas:

- Hvizdets settlement hromada with the administration in Hvizdets;
- Korshiv rural hromada with the administration in Korshiv;
- Mateivtsi rural hromada with the administration in Mateivtsi;
- Nyzhnii Verbizh rural hromada with the administration in Nyzhnii Verbizh;
- Otyniia settlement hromada with the administration in Otyniia;
- Pechenizhyn settlement hromada with the administration in Pechenizhyn;
- Piadyky rural hromada with the administration in Piadyky;
- Pidhaichyky rural hromada with the administration in Pidhaichyky.

== Rural settlements and villages ==
- Babianka (Баб'янка)
- Beremiany (Берем'яни)
- Bohorodychyn (Богородичин)
- Velykyi Kamianka (Велика Кам'янка)
- Velykyi Kliuchiv (Великий Ключів)
- Verkhnii Verbizh (Верхній Вербіж)
- Vynohrad (Виноград)
- Vorona (Ворона)
- Voskresyntsi (Воскресинці)
- Hanniv (Ганнів)
- Hvizdets (Гвіздець) (urban-type settlement)
- Hody-Dobrovidka (Годи-Добровідка)
- Holoskiv (Голосків)
- Hrabych (Грабич)
- Hrushiv (Грушів)
- Debeslavtsi (Дебеславці)
- Dzhurkiv (Джурків)
- Zhukotyn (Жукотин)
- Zahaipil (Загайпіль)
- Zaluchchia (Залуччя)
- Zakrivtsi (Закрівці)
- Zamulyntsi (Замулинці)
- Ivanivka (Іванівка)
- Kazaniv (Казанів)
- Kyidantsi (Кийданці)
- Kniazhdvir (Княждвір)
- Kobylets (Кобилець)
- Kovalivka (Ковалівка)
- Kornych (Корнич)
- Korolivka (Королівка)
- Korshiv (Коршів)
- Kropyvyshche (Кропивище)
- Lisky (Ліски)
- Lisna Slobidka (Лісна Слобідка)
- Lisnyi Khlibychyn (Лісний Хлібичин)
- Mala Kamianka (Мала Кам'янка)
- Mala Slobidka (Мала Слобідка)
- Malyi Hvizdets (Малий Гвіздець)
- Malyi Kliuchiv (Малий Ключів)
- Markivka (Марківка)
- Mateivtsi (Матеївці)
- Myshyn (Мишин)
- Molodyliv (Молодилів)
- Molodiatyn (Молодятин)
- Nazirna (Назірна)
- Nyzhnia Velesnytsia (Нижня Велесниця)
- Nyzhnii Verbizh (Нижній Вербіж)
- Ostapkivtsi (Остапківці)
- Otyniia (Отинія) (urban-type settlement)
- Piadyky (П'ядики)
- Pereryv (Перерив)
- Pechenizhyn (Печеніжин) (urban-type settlement)
- Pylypy (Пилипи)
- Pidhaichyky (Підгайчики)
- Rakivchyk (Раківчик)
- Runhury (Рунгури)
- Semakivtsi (Семаківці)
- Skopivka (Скопівка)
- Sloboda (Слобода)
- Sopiv (Сопів)
- Spas (Спас)
- Staryi Hvizdets (Старий Гвіздець)
- Strupkiv (Струпків)
- Sidlyshche (Сідлище)
- Tovmachyk (Товмачик)
- Torhovytsia (Торговиця)
- Trostianka (Тростянка)
- Turka (Турка)
- Uhornyky (Угорники)
- Fativtsi (Фатівці)
- Tseniava (Ценява)
- Cheremkhiv (Черемхів)
- Sheparivtsi (Шепарівці)
