= Violence and video games =

Relationship between violence and video games

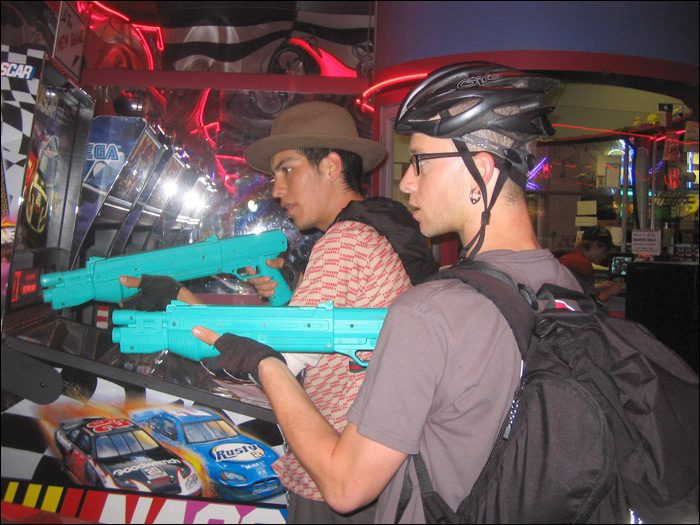
Arcade-goers playing a light gun video game

Since their inception in the 1970s, video games have often been criticized by some individuals for violent content. Politicians, parents, and other activists have claimed that violence in video games can be tied to violent behavior, particularly in children, and have sought ways to regulate the sale of video games. Studies have shown no connection between video games and violent behavior. The American Psychological Association states that while there is a well-established link between violent video games and aggressive behaviors, there is insufficient scientific evidence to support a causal link between violent video games and actual criminal violence, and that attributing acts of violence to violent video gaming "is not scientifically sound."

== Background ==
Since the late 1990s, acts of violence have been highly publicized, where it is often assumed that suspects may have a history of playing violent video games. The 1999 Columbine High School massacre created a moral panic around video games, spurring research to see if violent video games lead to aggressive behaviors in real life. Some research finds that violent video game use is correlated with, and will not cause, increases in aggression and decreases in prosocial behavior. Other research argues that there are no such effects of violent video games. This link between violent video games and antisocial behavior was denied by the president of the Interactive Digital Software Association in 2005 in a PBS interview. In the interview, he stated that the problem is "vastly overblown and overstated" by people who "don't understand, frankly, this industry". Others have theorized that there are positive effects of playing video games, including prosocial behavior in some contexts, and argue that the video game industry has been used as a scapegoat for more generalized problems affecting some communities.

A primary concern about a potential relationship between violence and video games is that a significant portion of gamers are young, and as such, particularly impressionable. A large-scale study conducted in 2022 suggested that at least a quarter of all gamers are between 10 and 20 years of age. Additionally, a survey of 1,102 children between 12 and 17 years of age found that 97% are video game players who have played on the last day, of which 14% of girls and 50% of boys favored games with an "M" (mature) or "AO" (adult-only) rating—and 25% of parents do not check the censor's rating on a video game before allowing their child to purchase it.

== History ==
=== Before video games ===
Elements of the type of moral panic that came with video games after they gained popularity had previously been seen with comic books. Through the 1950s, comics were in their Golden Age, having become a widely popular form of media. As the media expanded, some artists and publishers took more risks with violent and otherwise questionable content. Fredric Wertham, a psychiatrist, wrote Seduction of the Innocent in 1954, which outlined his studies asserting that violent comics were a negative form of literature and led to juvenile delinquency. Even though some of Wertham's claims were later found to be based on inaccurate studies, the book created a moral panic that put pressure on the comic book industry to regulate their works. Later in 1954, the comic industry issued the Comics Code Authority (CCA) which put strict regulations on content that could appear in comic books sold at most stores, eliminating most violence and other mature content via self-censoring. The mainstream comic industries waned as comics had lost their edge, while an underground market for the more adult comics formed. The comic industry did not recover from Comics Code Authority regulations until the 1970s, when adherence to the Authority was weakened. By the 2000s, the Authority was generally no longer considered. Modern trends of targeting violence in video games have been compared to these events in the comic industry, and video game industry leaders have specifically avoided the use of self-censorship that could impact the performance of the industry.

Pinball machines had also created a moral panic in the post-World War II United States, as the teenage rebels of the 1950s and 1960s would frequently hang around establishments with pinball machines, which created fear across the generation gap of older Americans unsure of the intents of this younger crowd. To some, it appeared to be a form of gambling (which led to machines being labeled "For Amusement Only"), while more religious people feared pinball was a "tool of the devil". Because of this, many cities and towns banned pinball machines or implemented strict licensing requirements which were slowly lifted in the late 1960s and early 1970s. Notably, New York City's ban on pinball machines lasted until 1976, while Chicago's was lifted in 1977. The appearance of video games in the early 1970s overlapped with the lifting of bans on pinball machines, and when youth were drawn to arcade games, the same concerns that were initially leveled at pinball machines as gambling machines and immoral playthings were also made about video games.

=== 1970s–1980s ===
After Pong exploded onto the arcade game market, arcade game manufacturers were aware of the attention that video games were getting and tried to position games as entertainment aimed at adults, selling units preferably to bars and lounges. This gave them more leeway with content, but still which drew criticism from some. Two arcade games had already drawn attention for amoral content prior to 1976. Atari's Gotcha in 1973, a maze game, initially shipped with two joystick units that were covered in pink domes as to represent women's breasts, but which were removed in later makes. The 1975 Shark Jaws, also by Atari, was an unlicensed adaption of the film Jaws and attempted to play on the film's violent context, though here, the player was hunted by the shark. As arcade games spread into more locations, the ease for children to access the games also elevated concerns about their potential impacts.

The 1976 arcade game Death Race is considered the first game to be targeted for its violent content. The game, like Shark Jaws, was an unlicensed adaption of the 1975 film Death Race 2000, a violent film centered on driving. Within the game, the player was challenged to drive a car and run over simulated gremlins scoring points for doing so. Besides the game's simulated content, the game cabinet was also adorned with imagery of death. The game caught the attention of an Associated Press writer, Wendy Walker, who had contacted the game's manufacturer, Exidy, with her concerns that the game was excessively violent. Walker's concerns spread through other media organizations, including the National Safety Council, who accused the game of glorifying the act of running people over when at the time they were trying to educate drivers about safe driving practices. While some arcades subsequently returned the Death Race machines due to this panic, sales of the game continued to grow due to the media coverage. It was recognized that many other competing arcade games at the time, like Cops 'n' Robbers, Tank 8, and Jet Fighter, all games equally about violent actions, saw little complaint. Nolan Bushnell of Atari said that "We Atari had an internal rule that we wouldn't allow violence against people. You could blow up a tank or you could blow up a flying saucer, but you couldn't blow up people. We felt that that was not good form, and we adhered to that all during my tenure."

United States Surgeon General C. Everett Koop was one of the first to raise concerns about the potential connection of video games to youth behavior. In 1982, Koop stated as a personal observation that "more and more people are beginning to understand" the connection between video games and mental and physical health effects on youth, though that at that time, there was not sufficient evidence to make any conclusion.

=== 1990s ===
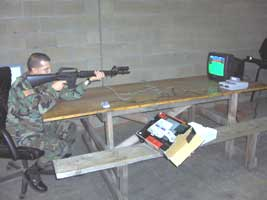
Retired lieutenant colonel Dave Grossman drew comparisons between arcade shooter games and video equipment he used to teach marksmanship while in the United States Army.

==== Mortal Kombat and congressional hearings (1993–1994) ====
The fighting game Mortal Kombat was released into arcades in 1992. It was one of the first games to depict a large amount of blood and gore, particularly during special moves known as "Fatalities" used to finish off the losing character. Numerous arcade games that used high amounts of violent content followed in Mortal Kombat's wake. However, as these games were originally exclusive to arcade machines, it was generally possible to segregate them away from games aimed for younger players. Eventually, there was significant interest from home console manufacturers in licensing Mortal Kombat from Midway Games, particularly from Sega for its Sega Genesis platform and Nintendo for the Super Nintendo Entertainment System. At the time, Sega and Nintendo were in the midst of a console war to try to gain dominance in the United States market. Sega's licensed version of Mortal Kombat retained all the gore from the arcade version (though required a use of a cheat code to activate it), while Nintendo had a version developed that removed most of the gore, recoloring the blood as grey "sweat" and otherwise toning down the game. Sega's version drastically outsold Nintendo's version and intensified the competition between the two companies.

The popularity of Mortal Kombat, along with the full-motion video game Night Trap and the light gun shooting game Lethal Enforcers, gained attention from U.S. Senators Joe Lieberman and Herb Kohl. This resulted in two congressional hearings in 1993 and 1994 to discuss the issues of violence and video games with concerned advocacy groups, academics, and the video game industry. Sega, Nintendo, and others were criticized for lacking a standardized content rating system, and Lieberman threatened to have Congress pass legislation requiring a system that would have government oversight if the industry did not take its own steps. By the time of the second hearing, Sega, Nintendo, and other console manufacturers had outlined their agreed-upon approach for a voluntary rating system through the Entertainment Software Ratings Board (ESRB), which was in place by the end of 1994. This also led to the establishment of the Interactive Digital Software Association, later known as the Entertainment Software Association (ESA), a trade group for the video game industry that managed the ESRB and further supported trade-wide aspects such as government affairs.

==== Jack Thompson lawsuits (1997) ====
Disbarred American attorney Jack Thompson has criticized a number of video games for perceived obscenity and campaigned against their producers and distributors. He argues that violent video games have repeatedly been used by teenagers as "murder simulators" to rehearse violent plans. He has pointed to alleged connections between such games and a number of school massacres.

==== Columbine High School massacre (1999) ====
The Columbine High School massacre on April 20, 1999, reignited the debate about violence in video games. Among other factors, the perpetrators, Eric Harris and Dylan Klebold, were found to be avid players of violent games like Doom. The public perceived a connection between video games and the shooting, leading to a Congressional hearing and President Bill Clinton ordering an investigation into school shootings and how video games were being marketed to youth. The report, released in 2004 by the United States Secret Service and the United States Department of Education, found that 12% of perpetrators in school shootings had shown interest in video games.

In the aftermath of the Columbine shooting, previous school shootings were re-evaluated by media and connections were drawn between Columbine and the 1998 Westside Middle School shooting. Although video games had not been identified as a factor at the time of the Westside shooting, media discussions of Columbine pointed to Westside as a similar case in that the two student perpetrators had often played GoldenEye 007 together and had enjoyed playing first-person shooter games prior to the shooting.

=== 2000s ===
==== Grand Theft Auto III and further lawsuits ====
In 2001, Rockstar Games released the PlayStation 2 game Grand Theft Auto III. The game gave the player control of a protagonist named Claude in a contemporary urban setting taking on missions within the city's criminal underworld. The game was one of the first open world games and allowed the player to have nearly free control of how they completed missions, which included gunplay, melee combat, and reckless driving. The game was widely successful, selling over two million units within six months. Its popularity led several groups to criticize the violence in the game, among other factors. Rockstar subsequently released two follow-up games, Grand Theft Auto: Vice City in 2002 and Grand Theft Auto: San Andreas in 2004, the latter becoming controversial for the sexually explicit Hot Coffee mod. After this incident, the government decided to take action. In 2005, California banned the sale of violent video games to minors.

In the years that followed, a number of murders and other crimes committed by young adults and youth were found to have ties to Grand Theft Auto III and later games that followed in its footsteps. Jack Thompson became involved in trying to sue Rockstar, its publisher Take-Two Interactive, and Sony on behalf of the victims for large amounts of damages, asserting that the violence in these games led directly to the crimes. Thus these companies were responsible for said crimes. These cases ultimately did not lead to any action against Rockstar, as they were either voluntarily withdrawn or dismissed before judgment. Thompson agreed to no longer seek legal action against Take-Two's games and ultimately became an activist to highlight the issues of violence in video games. The events of this period were made into a BBC docudrama, The Gamechangers, which was first broadcast in September 2015.

==== Murder of Khuan Phokaeng (2008) ====
On 2 August 2008, 18-year-old secondary school student Polwat Chinno murdered taxi driver Khuan Phokaeng while attempting to rob him in Bangkok, Thailand. Polwat, who was addicted to Grand Theft Auto IV, claimed he was trying to imitate scenes from the game and was also driven by a desperate need for money to play it every day, which he could not afford with his daily allowance. The incident led to a nationwide ban on the sale of Grand Theft Auto games in Thailand.

==== Winnenden school shooting (2009) ====
The shooter in the Winnenden school shooting on March 11, 2009, in Winnenden, Germany, was found to have had interest in video games like Counter-Strike and Far Cry 2. In the weeks that followed, politicians and concerned citizens tried to pressure the government into passing legislation to ban the sale of violent video games in the country, though this never came to pass.

==== Call of Duty: Modern Warfare 2's "No Russian" (2009) ====
The 2009 first-person shooter Call of Duty: Modern Warfare 2 included a controversial mission in its story mode called "No Russian". In the mission, the player takes on the role of a CIA agent who has embedded himself among a Russian ultranationalist terrorist group; the leader of the group warns them to speak "no Russian" to give away their origins. The mission allows the player to participate in a terrorist attack at a Moscow airport, during which they may fire indiscriminately on civilians and security alike. Participation in the mission is not mandatory: a disclaimer before the mission begins warns the player about the violent content and gives the option to skip the level. If the player chooses to play the level, they are not required to participate in the shooting in order to complete the level. The level ends when the terrorist group's leader kills the player-character in order to frame the attack as the work of the United States, leading to a world war.

The existence of the level leaked before the game's release, forcing publisher Activision and developer Infinity Ward to respond to journalists and activists that were critical of the concept of the mission. Activision defended the level's inclusion in the finished game, emphasizing that the mission was not representative of the rest of the game and that initial assessments had taken the level out of context. Even with the full game's release, "No Russian" was still criticized, with some stating that video games had yet to mature. The mission is considered a watershed moment for the video game industry, in how certain depictions of violence can be seen as acceptable while others, like "No Russian", are considered unacceptable.

=== 2010s ===
==== “Hyeonpi” Lineage incident in Korea (2010) ====
In South Korea in 2010, an internet game broadcaster was collectively beaten by members of the opposing guild during a broadcast. The assailants were antagonized by his belittling game characters and mocking their guild on his broadcasts. The term "Hyeonpi" refers in Korea to "online disputes where the parties meet physically in person".

==== Brown v. Entertainment Merchants Association (2011) ====
To address violent video games, several U.S. states passed laws that restricted the sale of mature video games, particularly those with violent or sexual content, to children. Video game industry groups fought these laws in courts and won. The most significant case came out of a challenge to a California law passed in 2005 that banned the sale of mature games to minors as well as requiring an enhanced content rating system beyond the ESRB's. Industry groups fought this and won, but the case ultimately made it to the Supreme Court of the United States. In Brown v. Entertainment Merchants Association, the Supreme Court ruled that video games were a protected form of speech, qualifying for First Amendment protections, and laws like California's that block sales on a basis outside of the Miller test were unconstitutional. Justice Antonin Scalia, who wrote the majority opinion, considered that violence in many video games was no different from that presented in other children's media, such as Grimm's Fairy Tales.

==== Sandy Hook Elementary School shooting (2012) ====
The Sandy Hook Elementary School shooting occurred on December 14, 2012. The perpetrator, Adam Lanza, was found to have a "trove" of video games, as described by investigating officials, including several games considered to be violent. This discovery started a fresh round of calls against violent video games in political and media circles, including a meeting on the topic between U.S. Vice President Joe Biden and representatives from the video game industry. The National Rifle Association of America blamed the video game industry for the shooting, identifying games that focused on shooting people in schools.

==== Munich Olympia Mall shooting (2016) ====
The 2016 Munich shooting occurred on July 22, 2016, in the vicinity of the Olympia Shopping Mall in the Moosach District of Munich, Bavaria, Germany. The perpetrator, David Sonboly, killed 9 people before killing himself when surrounded by police. As a result, the German Minister of the Interior, Thomas de Maizière, claimed that the "intolerable extent of video games on the internet" has a harmful effect on the development of young people. His statements were criticized by media specialist Maic Mausch, who said with regards to Maiziere's statement that "No sensible scientist can say that with such certainty. And if no scientist can do it, no minister can do that."

==== Parkland school shooting (2018) ====
The Stoneman Douglas High School shooting occurred on February 14, 2018, in Parkland, Florida. In the aftermath, Kentucky Governor Matt Bevin declared that the country should re-evaluate "the things being put in the hands of our young people", specifically "quote-unquote video games" that "have desensitized people to the value of human life". A month later, President Donald Trump called for several industry representatives and advocates to meet in Washington, D.C. to discuss the impact of violent video games with him and his advisors. Industry leaders included Michael Gallagher, ESA president; Patricia Vance, ESRB president; Robert Altman, CEO of ZeniMax Media; and Strauss Zelnick, CEO of Take-Two, while advocates included Brent Bozell, of the Media Research Center and Melissa Henson of the Parents Television Council. While the video game industry asserted the lack of connection between violent video games and violent acts, their critics asserted that the industry should take steps to limit youth access and marketing to violent video games in ways similar to the approaches taken for alcohol and tobacco use.

==== Suzano school shooting (2019) ====
The Suzano school shooting occurred on March 13, 2019, at the Professor Raul Brasil State School in the Brazilian municipality of Suzano, São Paulo. The perpetrators, Guilherme Taucci Monteiro and Luiz Henrique de Castro, managed to kill five school students and two school employees before Monteiro killed Castro and then committed suicide. As a result, Brazilian Vice President Hamilton Mourão claimed that young people are addicted to violent video games, while also claiming that the work routine of Brazilian parents made it harder for young people to be raised properly. As a result, the hashtag #SomosGamersNãoAssassinos ("#WeAreGamersNotMurderers") gained popularity in Brazil.

==== August 2019 shootings ====
Two mass shootings occurring within a day of each other, one in El Paso, Texas and another in Dayton, Ohio, in August 2019 provoked political claims that video games were partially to blame for the incidents. U.S. President Donald Trump stated days after the shootings, "We must stop the glorification of violence in our society. This includes the gruesome and grisly video games that are now commonplace". House Minority Leader Kevin McCarthy also blamed video games for these events, stating, "I've always felt that it's a problem for future generations and others. We've watched from studies, shown before, what it does to individuals, and you look at these photos of how it took place, you can see the actions within video games and others." News organizations and the video game industry reiterated the findings of the past, that there was no link between video games and violent behavior, and criticized politicians for putting video games to task when the issues lied within proper gun control.

==== Halle synagogue shooting (2019) ====
The Halle synagogue shooting occurred on October 9, 2019, in Halle, Saxony-Anhalt, Germany, continuing in nearby Landsberg. The suspect, identified by the media as Stephan Baillet, was influenced by far-right ideology and managed to live-stream his attack on Facebook and Twitch. In the process of the attack, he managed to kill two people before being subdued by police. Given the live-streamed nature of the attack, German Minister of the Interior Horst Seehofer claimed that "many of the perpetrators or the potential perpetrators come from the gaming scene" with regards to incidents like the shooting in Halle. His comments received widespread criticism from German gamers and politicians, such as SPD general secretary Lars Klingbeil, who stated that "The problem is right-wing extremism, not gamers or anything else."

=== 2020s ===
==== School shooting in Torreon, Mexico (2020) ====
Hours after a school shooting in Torreón, Coahuila, Mexico, in January 2020, the governor of that state, Miguel Ángel Riquelme Solís, stated that the 11-year-old shooter was wearing a T-shirt with the logo of Natural Selection, a mod for the game Half-Life, and claimed he could have been influenced by the game. The governor's comment sparked a debate about the link between violence and video games. Erik Salazar Flores of the College of Psychology of the National Autonomous University of Mexico (UNAM) stated that blaming video games for violence is an "easy way out" for authorities who wish to ignore the complexity of the problem. Dalila Valenzuela, a sociologist from Autonomous University of Baja California said that while video games can influence children's behavior, their parents are most directly responsible.

==== Nahel Merzouk protests (2023) ====
In June 2023, Nahel Merzouk, a 17-year-old of North African descent, was killed by police in the Parisian suburb of Nanterre. As protests and riots gripped France in the aftermath, President Emmanuel Macron criticized what he called the "intoxicating effect" of video games and social media for the civil unrest gripping the country.

==== Jakarta school bombing (2025) ====
On November 7, 2025, a 17-year-old male student detonated an improvised explosive device at the State High School 72 of Jakarta, injuring 97 people, himself included. While the suspect was accused of having taken inspiration from European and North American far right terrorists, President Prabowo Subianto, through his spokesperson Prasetyo Hadi, stated that the government of Indonesia was prepared to restrict violent video games such as PUBG: Battlegrounds, as it was considered by Indonesian officials to have been contributory to the incident.

==== Tacloban school shooting (2026) ====
On June 22, 2026, two suspects, aged 14 and 15, shot and killed 3 students and injured 20 others at the San Jose National High School in Tacloban, Philippines. Described as an extremely rare incident of a school shooting happening in the country, it led to government scrutiny of social media and violent video games among minors in the Philippines, resulting in the temporary ban of the game GoreBox by local authorities.

==== Polish school stabbings (2026) ====
From October 7, 2026 until October 10, 2026, a spate of stabbings took place in schools across the Masovian Voivodeship of Poland, killing one and injuring 15. In response to the incidents, the Prime Minister of Poland, Donald Tusk, blamed nihilistic violent extremism, social media, and video game violence in online communities such as Minecraft for the attacks in those schools. His statements were ridiculed by far-right Polish politician Sławomir Mentzen, who referenced Grand Theft Auto in his criticism of Tusk on X.

== Studies ==
The policy statement of the American Psychological Association (APA) related to video games states "Scant evidence has emerged that makes any causal or correlational connection between playing violent video games and actually committing violent activities". The APA has acknowledged that violent video games strongly correlates with aggressive behavior, as well as anti-social behavior, but distinguishes between aggression and violence. A 2015 APA review of current studies in this area described the link between violent video games and aggressive behavior as "both as an increase in negative outcomes such as aggressive behavior, cognition, and affect and as a decrease in positive outcomes such as prosocial behavior, empathy, and sensitivity to aggression." However, the APA recognized the studies tended to be disproportionate to normal demographics.

Further, the APA issued a policy statement in 2017 aimed at politicians and media to urge them to avoid linking violent video games with violent crimes, reiterating the subject of their findings over the years. In a follow-up statement in 2020, the APA reaffirmed that there remains insufficient evidence to link video games to violent behavior. They had found that there was "small, reliable association between violent video game use and aggressive outcomes, such as yelling and pushing," but could not extend that to more violent activities.

Christopher Ferguson, a professor at Stetson University and a researcher on the connection between violent video games and violent behavior, has stated that "[t]here's not evidence of a correlation, let alone a causation" between videogames and violence. Ferguson's more recent studies have shown that there is no predictive behavior that can be inferred from the playing of violent video games.

A longitudinal study published in Molecular Psychiatry in 2021 found no significant changes in semantic accessibility to aggressive words, frustration tolerance, empathy, or prosocial behavior between those who played a violent video game and those who played a non-violent video game daily for two months. Similarly, a 2023 study published in eLife found that playing violent video games, specifically Grand Theft Auto V, does not decrease empathy in players. The research used fMRI and behavioral tests to measure empathy and found no significant evidence of reduced empathetic responses or emotional reactions to violence in players.

== Causation of violence theory ==
Theories about the effects of video games tend to focus on players' modeling of behaviors observed in the game. These effects may be exacerbated due to the interactive nature of these games. The most well-known theory of such effects is the cognitive neo-association theory (also referred to as Script Theory), which proposes that playing violent video games may create cognitive scripts of aggression which will be activated in incidents in which individuals think others are acting with hostility. Playing violent video games, thus, becomes an opportunity to rehearse acts of aggression, which then become more common in real life. The General Aggression Model, a meta-theoretical framework to understand how various theories work together to explain aggressive behaviors, incorporates various theories suggesting that the simulated violence of video games may influence players' thoughts, feelings and physical arousal, affecting individuals' interpretation of others' behavior and increasing their own aggressive behavior. Some scholars have criticized the general aggression model, arguing that the model wrongly assumes that aggression is primarily learned and that the brain does not distinguish reality from fiction. Some recent studies have explicitly claimed to find evidence against the effect of short-term exposure to violent video games on aggression.

Some biological theories of aggression have specifically excluded video game and other media effects because the evidence for such effects is considered weak and the impact too distant. For example, the catalyst model of aggression comes from a diathesis-stress perspective, implying that aggression is due to a combination of genetic risk and environmental strain. The catalyst model suggests that stress, coupled with antisocial personality are salient factors leading to aggression. It does allow that proximal influences such as family or peers may alter aggressiveness, but not media and games.

=== Research methods ===
Research has focused on two elements of the effects of video games on players: the player's health measures and educational achievements as a function of game play amounts; the players' behavior or perceptions as a function of the game's violence levels; the context of the game play in terms of group dynamics; the game's structure which affects players' visual attention or three dimensional constructional skills; and the mechanics of the game which affects hand–eye coordination. Two other research methods that have been used are experimental (in a laboratory), where the different environmental factors can be controlled, and non-experimental, where those who participate in studies simply log their video gaming hours.

=== Scientific debate ===
A common theory is that playing violent video games increases aggression in young people. Various studies claim to support this hypothesis. Other studies find no link. Debate among scholars on both sides remains contentious, and there is argument about whether consensus exists regarding the effects of violent video games on aggression.

==== Primary studies ====
In 1998, Steven Kirsh reported in the journal Childhood that the use of video games may lead to acquisition of a hostile attribution bias. Fifty-five subjects were randomized to play either violent or non-violent video games. Subjects were later asked to read stories in which the characters' behaviour was ambiguous. Participants randomized to play violent video games were more likely to provide negative interpretations of the stories. Another study done by Anderson and Dill in 2000 found a correlation in undergraduate students between playing violent video games and violent crime, with the correlation stronger in aggressive male players, although other scholars have suggested that results from this study were not consistent, and that the methodology was flawed.

In 2001, David Satcher, the Surgeon General of the United States, said "We clearly associate media violence to aggressive behavior. But the impact was very small compared to other things. Some may not be happy with that, but that's where the science is."

A 2004 US Secret Service study of 41 individuals who had been involved in school shootings found that twelve percent were attracted to violent video games, twenty-four percent read violent books and twenty-seven percent were attracted to violent films. Some scholars have indicated that these numbers are unusually low compared to violent media consumption among non-criminal youth.

In 2003, a study was conducted at Iowa State University assessing pre-existing attitudes and violence in children. The study concerned children between ages 5 and 12 that were assessed for the typical amount of time they played video games per week and pre-existing empathy and attitudes towards violence. The children played a violent or non-violent video game for approximately 15 minutes. Afterwards, their pulse rates were recorded, and the children were asked how frustrating the games were on a 1-10 scale. Last, the children are given drawings (vignettes) of everyday situations, some more likely to have aggressive actions following the depiction, while others an empathetic action. Results show that there were no significant effects of video game playing in the short term, with violent video games and non-violent video games having no significant differences, indicating that children do not have decreased empathy from playing violent video games. Conversely, children who play more violent video games over a long period of time were associated with lower pre-existing empathy, and also lower scores on the empathy inducing vignettes, indicating long-term effects. It is possible that video games had not primed children for the particular aggression scenarios. This data could indicate desensitization in children can occur after long-term exposure, but not all children were affected in the same way, so the researchers deduced that some children may be at a higher risk of these negative effects. It is possible that fifteen minutes is not quite long enough to produce short-term cognitive effects.

In 2003, Jeanne B. Funk and her colleagues at the Department of Psychology at the University of Toledo examined the relationship between exposure to violence through media and real-life, and desensitization (reflected by loss of empathy and changes in attitudes toward violence) in fourth and fifth grade pupils. Funk found that exposure to video game violence was associated with lowered empathy and stronger proviolence attitudes.

Another study from 2003, by John Colwell at the University of Westminster, found that violent video game playing was associated with reduced aggression among Japanese youth.

The American Psychological Association (APA) released an official statement in 2005 (which updated in 2015, see below), which said that exposure to violent media increases feelings of hostility, thoughts about aggression, suspicions about the motives of others, and demonstrates violence as a method to deal with potential conflict situations, that comprehensive analysis of violent interactive video game research suggests such exposure increases aggressive behavior, thoughts, angry feelings, physiological arousal, and decreases helpful behavior, and that studies suggest that sexualized violence in the media has been linked to increases in violence towards women, rape myth acceptance and anti-women attitudes. It also states that the APA advocates reduction of all violence in videogames and interactive media marketed to children and youth, that research should be made regarding the role of social learning, sexism, negative depiction of minorities, and gender on the effects of violence in video games and interactive media on children, adolescents, and young adults, and that it engages those responsible for developing violent video games and interactive media in addressing the issue that playing violent video games may increase aggressive thoughts and aggressive behaviors in children, youth, and young adults, and that these effects may be greater than the well documented effects of exposure to violent television and movies. They also recommend to the entertainment industry that the depiction of the consequences of violent behavior be associated with negative social consequences and that they support a rating system which accurately reflects the content of video games and interactive media.

Some scholars suggested that the APA's policy statement ignored discrepant research and misrepresented the scientific literature. In 2013 a group of over 230 media scholars wrote an open letter to the APA asking them to revisit and greatly amend their policy statement on video game violence, due to considering the evidence to be mixed. Signatories to the 2013 letter included psychologists Jeffrey Arnett, Randy Borum, David Buss, David Canter, Lorenza Colzato, M. Brent Donnellan, Dorothy Espelage, Frank Farley, Christopher Ferguson, Peter Gray, Mark D. Griffiths, Jessica Hammer, Mizuko Ito, James C. Kaufman, Dana Klisanin, Catherine McBride-Chang, Jean Mercer, Hal Pashler, Steven Pinker, Richard M. Ryan, Todd K. Shackelford, Daniel Simons, Ian Spence, and Dean Simonton, criminologists Kevin Beaver, James Alan Fox, Roger J.R. Levesque, and Mike A. Males, game design researchers Bob De Schutter and Kurt Squire, communications scholar Thorsten Quandt, and science writer Richard Rhodes.

In 2005, a study by Bruce D. Bartholow and colleagues at the University of Missouri, University of Michigan, Vrije Universiteit, and University of North Carolina using event related potential linked video game violence exposure to brain processes hypothetically reflecting desensitization. The authors suggested that chronic exposure to violent video games have lasting harmful effects on brain function and behavior.

In 2005, a study at Iowa State University, the University of Michigan, and Vrije Universiteit by Nicholas L. Carnagey and colleagues found that participants who had previously played a violent video game had lower heart rate and galvanic skin response while viewing filmed real violence, demonstrating a physiological desensitization to violence.

In 2007, a study at the Swinburne University of Technology found that children had variable reactions to violent games, with some becoming more aggressive, some becoming less aggressive, but the majority showing no changes in behavior.

In 2008, a longitudinal study conducted in Japan assessed possible long-term effects of video game playing in children. The final analysis consisted of 591 fifth-graders aged 10–11 across eight public elementary schools, and was conducted over the course of a year. Initially, children were asked to complete a survey which assessed presence or absence of violence in the children's favorite video games, as well as video game context variables that may affect the results and the aggression levels of the children. Children were assessed again for these variables a year later. Results reveal that there is a significant difference in gender, with boys showing significantly more aggressive behavior and anger than girls, which was attributed by the authors to boys' elevated interest in violent video games. However, the interaction between time spent gaming and preference for violent games was associated with reduced aggression in boys but not girls. The researchers also found that eight context variables they assessed increased aggression, including unjustified violence, availability of weapons, and rewards. Three context variables, role-playing, extent of violence, and humor, were associated with decreased aggression. It is unknown if the observed changes from the two surveys are actually contextual effects. The researchers found that the context and quality of the violence in video games affects children more than simply presence and amount of violence, and these effects are different from child to child.

In 2008, the Pew Internet and American Life Project statistically examined the impact of video gaming on youths' social and communal behaviors. Teens who had communal gaming experiences reported much higher levels of civic and political engagement than teens who had not had these kinds of experiences. Youth who took part in social interaction related to the game, such as commenting on websites or contributing to discussion boards, were more engaged communally and politically. Among teens who play games, 63% reported seeing or hearing "people being mean and overly aggressive while playing," 49% reported seeing or hearing "people being hateful, racist or sexist while playing", and 78% reported witnessing "people being generous or helpful while playing".

In 2009, a report of three studies conducted among students of different age groups in Singapore, Japan, and the United States, found that prosocial mostly nonviolent games increased helpful prosocial behaviour among the participants.

In 2010, Patrick and Charlotte Markey suggested that violent video games only caused aggressive feelings in individuals who had a preexisting disposition, such as high neuroticism, low agreeableness, or low conscientiousness.

In 2010, after a review of the effects of violent video games, the Attorney General's Office of Australia reported that even though the Anderson meta-analysis of 2010 was the pinnacle of the scientific debate at that time, significant harm from violent video games had not been persuasively proven or disproven, except that there was some consensus that they might be harmful to people with aggressive or psychotic personality traits.

The attorney general considered a number of issues including:

- Social and political controversy about the topic.
- Lack of consensus about definitions and measures of aggression and violent video games (for example, whether a cartoon game has the same impact as a realistic one).
- Levels of aggression may or may not be an accurate marker for the likelihood of violent behaviour.
- The playing of violent video games may not be an independent variable in determining violent acts (for example, violent behaviour after playing violent video games may be age dependant, or players of violent video games may watch other violent media).
- Studies may not have been long or large enough to provide clear conclusions.

In 2010, researchers Paul Adachi and Teena Willoughby at Brock University critiqued experimental video game studies on both sides of the debate, noting that experimental studies often confounded violent content with other variables such as competitiveness. In a follow up study, the authors found that competitiveness but not violent content was associated with aggression.

In 2011, a thirty-year study of 14,000 college students, published by the University of Michigan which measured overall empathy levels in students, found that these had dropped by 40% since the 1980s. The biggest drop came after the year 2000, which the authors speculated was due to multiple factors, including increased societal emphasis on selfishness, changes in parenting practices, increased isolation due to time spent with information technology, and greater immersion in all forms of violent and/or narcissistic media including, but not limited to, news, television and video games. The authors did not provide data on media effects, but referenced various research of the topics.

In 2011, in a longitudinal study of youth in Germany, von Salisch found that aggressive children tend to select more violent video games. This study found no evidence that violent games caused aggression in minors. The author speculated that other studies may have been affected by "single responder bias" due to self-reporting of aggression rather than reporting by parents or teachers.

In 2012, a Swedish study examined the cooperative behavior of players in The Lord of the Rings Online. The authors argued that attempts to link collaborative or aggressive behavior within the game to real life behavior would rely on unwarranted assumptions regarding equivalencies of forms of cooperation and the material conditions of the environment in-game and out-of-game.

One study from Morgan Tear and Mark Nielsen in 2013 concluded that violent video games did not reduce or increase prosocial behavior, failing to replicated previous studies in this area.

In 2013, Isabela Granic and colleagues at Radboud University Nijmegen, the Netherlands, argued that even violent video games may promote learning, health, and social skills, but that not enough games had been developed to treat mental health problems. Granic et al. noted that both camps have valid points, and a more balanced perspective and complex picture is necessary.

In 2014, Ferguson and Olson found no correlation between video game violence and bullying or delinquency in children with preexisting attention deficit disorder or depressive symptoms.

In 2014, Villanova professor Patrick M. Markey conducted a study with 118 teenagers suggesting that video games have no influence on increased aggression of users; however, he did find that when used for the right amount of time (roughly 1 hour) video games can make children nicer and more socially interactive. This information was provided by the teens' teachers at their local schools.

A 2014 study by Andrew Przybylski at Oxford University examined the impact of violent content and frustration on hostility among video game players. In a series of experiments, Przybylski and colleagues demonstrated that frustration, but not violent content, increased player hostility. The authors also demonstrated that some previous "classic" violent video game experiments were difficult to replicate.

One longitudinal study from 2014 suggested that violent video games were associated with very small increases in risk taking behavior over time.

In 2015, the American Psychological Association released a review that found that violent video games caused aggressive behavior, with Mark Appelbaum, the chair of the task force that conducted the review, saying that "the link between violence in video games and increased aggression in players is one of the most studied and best established in the field." However, Appelbaum also characterized the size of the correlation as "not very big". The same review found insufficient evidence of a link between such video games and crime or delinquency. Critics, including Peter Gray and Christopher Ferguson, expressed concerns about methodological limitations of the review. Ferguson stated that "I think (the task force members) were selected because their opinions were pretty clear going in." At least four of the seven task force members had previously expressed opinions on the topic; critics argued this alone constitutes a conflict of interest, while a task force member defended that "If it were common practice to exclude all scientists after they render one conclusion, the field would be void of qualified experts".

A 2015 study examined the impact of violent video games on young adults players with autism spectrum disorders (ASD). The study found no evidence for an impact of playing such games on aggression among ASD players. These results appeared to contradict concerns following the 2012 Sandy Hook shooting that individuals with ASD or other mental conditions might be particularly susceptible to violent video game effects.

One study from 2016 suggested that "sexist" games (using games from the Grand Theft Auto series as exemplars) may reduce empathy toward women. Although no direct game effect was found, the authors argued that an interaction between game condition, masculine role norms, gender and avatar identification produced enough evidence to claim causal effects. Comments by other scholars on this study reflect some concerns over the methodology including a possible failure of the randomization to game conditions (see comments tab).

In 2016, a preregistered study of violent video game effects concluded that violent video games did not influence aggression in players. The preregistered nature of the study removed the potential for the scholars to influence the results of the study in favor of the hypothesis and suggests that preregistration of future studies may help clarify results in the field.

==== Meta-analyses ====
Because the results of individual studies have often reached different conclusions, debate has often shifted to the use of meta-analysis. This method attempts to average across individual studies, determine whether there is some effect on average, and test possible explanations for differences between study results.

A number of meta-analyses have been conducted, at times reaching different conclusions. A 2001 meta-analysis reviewing the relationship between video game violence and aggression in teenagers (n = 3,033) found a significant and positive correlation, indicating that high video game violence does lead to greater aggression among teenagers.

Another meta-analysis conducted the same year by John Sherry was more skeptical of effects, specifically questioning whether the interactivity of video games made them have more effect than other media. Sherry later published another meta-analysis in 2007, again concluding that the influence of video game violence on aggression was minimal. Sherry also criticized the observed dose-response curve, reporting that smaller effects were found in experimental studies with longer exposure times, where one might expect greater exposure to cause greater effects.

In 2010, Anderson's group published a meta-analysis of one hundred and thirty international studies with over 130,000 participants. He reported that exposure to violent video games caused both short-term and long-term aggression in players and decreased empathy and pro-social behavior. However, other scholars criticized this meta-analysis for excluding non-significant studies and for other methodological flaws. Anderson's group have defended their analysis, rejecting these critiques. Rowell Huesmann, a psychology and social studies academic at the University of Michigan wrote an editorial supporting the Anderson meta-analysis. A later re-analysis of the Anderson meta-analysis suggested that there was greater publication bias among experiments than Anderson and colleagues had accounted for. This indicated that the effects observed in laboratory experiments may have been smaller than estimated and perhaps not statistically significant. A reply by Anderson and colleagues acknowledged that there was publication bias among experiments, but disagreed that the degree of bias was large enough to bring the effect into question.

A 2015 meta-analysis of video game effects suggested that video games, including violent games, had minimal impact on children's behavior including violence, prosocial behavior and mental health. The journal included a debate section on this meta-analysis including scholars who were both supportive and critical of this meta-analysis. The original author also responded to these comments, arguing that few coherent methodological critiques had been raised. In 2016, Kanamori and Doi replicated the original Angry Birds meta-analysis and concluded that critiques of the original meta were largely unwarranted.

In 2018, a meta-analysis of the relationship between violent video game play and physical aggression over time found that "violent video game play is positively associated with aggressive behavior, aggressive cognition, and aggressive affect, as well as negatively associated with empathy for victims of violence and with prosocial behavior".

A 2020 meta-analysis of long-term outcome studies concluded that evidence did not support links between earlier playing of violent games and later aggression. The authors found an overall correlation of r = 0.059, and stated that better quality studies were less likely to find evidence for effects than poorer quality studies.

==== fMRI studies ====
The extent to which video games have a long-term effect on the brain is disputed. Some scientists have attempted to use functional magnetic resonance imaging to study this hypothesis. Some studies suggested that participants who engaged with VVGs displayed increases in the functioning of their amygdala and decreases in the functioning of their frontal lobe. Some scholars argue that the effect on the frontal lobe may be similar to the deactivation seen in disruptive behavior disorders. However, potential funding conflicts of interest have been noted for some of these studies. During the Brown Vs. EMA legal case, it was noted that the studies conducted by Kronenberger were openly funded by "The Center for Successful Parenting", which may mean a conflict of interest.

Further, other studies have failed to find a link between violent games and diminished brain function. For example, an fMRI study by Regenbogen and colleagues found no link between violent video games and a diminished ability to differentiate between real and virtual violence. Another study from 2016 using fMRI found no evidence that VVGs led to a desensitization effect in players. In a recent BBC interview, Dr. Simone Kuhn explained that the brain effects seen in prior fMRI studies likely indicated that players were simply able to distinguish between reality and fiction and modulate their emotional reaction accordingly, not becoming desensitized.

==== Studies on the effect on crime ====
In 2008, records held by the US Office of Juvenile Justice and Delinquency Prevention and Office of Justice Programs indicated that arrests for violent crime in the US had decreased since the early 1990s in both children and adults. This decrease occurred contemporaneously with increasing sales of violent video games and increases in graphically violent content in those games.

Studies of violent video game playing and crime have generally not supported the existence of causal links. Evidence from studies of juveniles as well as criminal offenders has generally not uncovered evidence for links. Some studies have suggested that violent video game playing may be associated with reductions in some types of aggression, such as bullying.

Studies of mass shootings have, likewise, provided no evidence for links with violent video games. A 2002 report from the US Secret Service found that school shooters appeared to consume relatively low levels of violent media. Some criminologists have referred to claims linking violent video games to mass shootings as a "myth".

Some studies have examined the consumption of violent video games in society and violent crime rates. Generally, it is acknowledged that societal violent video game consumption has been associated with over an 80% reduction in youth violence in the US during the corresponding period. However, scholars note that, while this data is problematic for arguments that violent video games increase crime, such data is correlational and cannot be used to conclude video games have caused this decline in crime.

Other studies have examined data on violent video games and crime trends more closely and have come to the conclusion that the release of very popular violent video games are causally associated with corresponding declines in violent crime in the short term. A 2011 study by the Center for European Economic Research found that violent video games may be reducing crime. This is possibly because the time spent playing games reduces time spent engaged in more antisocial activities. Other recent studies by Patrick Markey and Scott Cunningham have come to similar conclusions.

=== Public debate in US ===
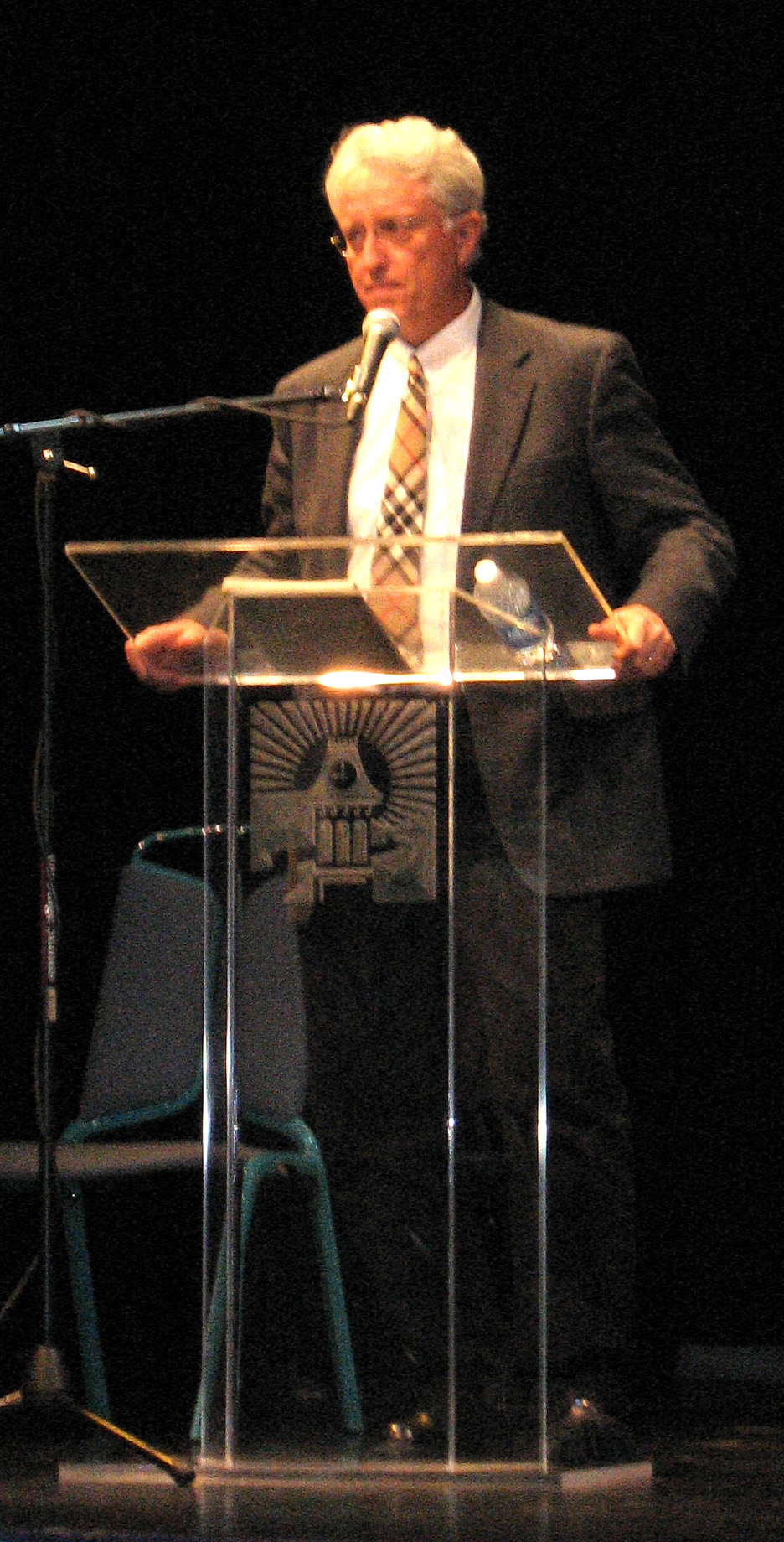
Jack Thompson, an activist, filed lawsuits against the makers of violent games, alleging that simulated violence causes real-world violence.

In the early 1980s, Ronnie Lamm, the president of the Long Island PTA sought legislation to govern the proximity of video game arcades to schools. In the 1990s, Joe Lieberman, a US Senator, chaired a hearing about violent video games such as Mortal Kombat. David Grossman, a former West Point psychology lecturer and lieutenant colonel, wrote books about violence in the media including: On Killing (1996) and Stop Teaching Our Kids to Kill (1999). He described first-person shooter games as murder simulators, and argued that video game publishers unethically train children in the use of weapons and harden them emotionally towards commitments of murder by simulating the killing of hundreds or thousands of opponents in a single typical video game.

In 2003, Craig A. Anderson, a researcher who testified on the topic before the U.S. Senate, said,

"[S]ome studies have yielded nonsignificant video game effects, just as some smoking studies failed to find a significant link to lung cancer. But when one combines all relevant empirical studies using meta-analytic techniques, it shows that violent video games are significantly associated with: increased aggressive behavior, thoughts, and affect; increased physiological arousal; and decreased pro-social (helping) behavior."

In 2005, Anderson was criticized in court for failing to give balanced expert evidence.

In 2008, in Grand Theft Childhood: The Surprising Truth About Violent Video Games and What Parents Can Do, Kutner and Olsen refuted claims that violent video games cause an increase in violent behavior in children. They report there is a scientifically non-significant trend showing that adolescents who do not play video games at all are most at risk for violent behavior and video game play is part of an adolescent boy's normal social setting. However, the authors did not completely deny the negative influences of violent (M-rated) video games on pre-teens and teenagers: Kutner and Olson suggested the views of alarmists and those of representatives of the video game industry are often supported by flawed or misconstrued studies and that the factors leading to violence in children and adolescents were more subtle than whether or not they played violent video games.

Henry Jenkins, an academic in media studies, said,

"According to federal crime statistics, the rate of juvenile violent crime in the United States is at a 30-year low. Researchers find that people serving time for violent crimes typically consume less media before committing their crimes than the average person in the general population. It's true that young offenders who have committed school shootings in America have also been game players. But young people in general are more likely to be gamers—90 percent of boys and 40 percent of girls play. The overwhelming majority of kids who play do not commit antisocial acts. According to a 2001 U.S. Surgeon General's report, the strongest risk factors for school shootings centered on mental stability and the quality of home life, not media exposure. The moral panic over violent video games is doubly harmful. It has led adult authorities to be more suspicious and hostile to many kids who already feel cut off from the system. It also misdirects energy away from eliminating the actual causes of youth violence and allows problems to continue to fester."

In 2013, Corey Mead, a professor of English at Baruch College, wrote about how the U.S. military financed the original development of video games, and has long used them for both training, recruitment purposes, and treatment of post traumatic stress disorder. He also argues that the two industries are currently intertwined into each other in a "military-entertainment complex". Writing in 2013, scholars James Ivory and Malte Elson noted that, although research on video game effects remained inconclusive, the culture of the academic field itself had become very contentious and that politicians had put pressure on scientists to produce specific research findings. The authors concluded it is improper for scholars or legislators to, at present, portray video games as a public health crisis. Research by Oxford psychologist Andrew Przybylski has shown that Americans are split in opinion on how video game violence links to gun violence. Przybylski found that older people, women rather than men, people who knew less about games and who were very conservative in ideology were most likely to think video games could cause gun violence.

Several groups address video game violence as a topic that they focus on. Groups such as Parents Against Violence, Parents Against Media Violence and One Million Moms take stances aimed at limiting the violence in video games and other media.

Video games, particularly violent ones, are often mentioned as a cause for major gun crimes in the wake of school shooting by young adults. For example, Adam Lanza, the 20-year-old perpetrator of the Sandy Hook Elementary School shooting, was found to have numerous video games in his possession, leading for some people to blame video games for the shooting; however, the State Attorney did not link video game to the event in their final report of the incident, though identified that video game addiction may have been connected. In February 2018, following the Stoneman Douglas High School shooting in Florida, President Donald Trump, among others, said "the level of violence on video games is really shaping young people's thoughts". Rhode Island state representative Robert Nardolillo also proposed legislation to tax violent video games (those rated "Mature" or higher by the ESRB) to use funds for supporting mental health programs in the state.

Following the Stoneman Douglas shooting event, President Trump arranged to meet with several video game industry professionals on March 8, 2018; in attendance beyond Trump and other Congressmen included Mike Gallagher, the president and CEO of the ESA; Pat Vance, the president of the ESRB; Strauss Zelnick, CEO of Take Two Interactive, Robert Altman, CEO of ZeniMax Media; Brent Bozell, founder of the Media Research Center; and Melissa Hanson, program manager for the Parents Television Council. The meeting was not designed to come to a solution but only for the invited parties to present their stance on video games and their relationship to violent activity as to try to determine appropriate steps in the future. At the start of the meeting, the President showed the attendees a short 88-second video of numerous violent video game segments put together by his staff, including the infamous "No Russian" level from Call of Duty: Modern Warfare 2, which featured the player watching and potentially participating in a massacre of civilians in an airport.

The White House later released the video to YouTube, where it quickly became popular due to the controversy over the relationship between video games and real-life violence; despite being unlisted shortly after being uploaded, it has reached about 1.6 million views as of 2023. The video is still accessible via URL, and media outlets like IGN included links to the original in their responses to the matter. Games for Change made a short response video with 550.000 views titled "#GameOn".

Within the second presidency of Donald Trump, Robert F. Kennedy, Jr., the Secretary of Health and Human Services, suggested that video games may lead to mass shootings among other reasons, in the wake of the Annunciation Catholic Church shooting in August 2025, and was ordering NIH to study the possible connection to gun violence.

== Nation factors ==
=== Australia ===
Video games are rated in Australia by the Australian Classification Board (ACB), run out of the federal Attorney-General's Department. ACB also oversees ratings on films and applies the same ratings system as to video games. Broadly, the ratings system is based on a number of factors including violence. The ACB can refuse to classify a film or game if they felt the content was beyond allowable guidelines for the strictest ratings. Titles refused classification by ACB are thus illegal to sell within Australia and assess fines for those that attempted to import such games, while allowing titles with more mature ratings to be sold under regulated practices. Prior to 2011, video games could only qualify up to a "MA15+" rating, and not the next highest tier of "R18+" which were allowed for film. Several high-profile games thus were banned in Australia. The ACB agreed to allow video games to have R18+ ratings in 2011, and some of these games that were previously banned were subsequently allowed under R18+.
