= 40th ward, Chicago =

40th Ward
- Current Chicago ward map, with 40th ward highlighted in red
- Communities: Lincoln Square, Budlong Woods, Bowmanville, West Ridge, Edgewater, Andersonville
- Next Election: 2027
- Established: 1923

Government
  - Alderman: Andre Vasquez (Ind.)
- Website: 40thward.org//

map of the Ward's 2015 boundaries

The 40th Ward is one of 50 wards that make up the Chicago City Council.

The ward includes several diverse neighborhoods surrounding Rosehill Cemetery, including Lincoln Square, Budlong Woods, Bowmanville, West Ridge, Edgewater and West Andersonville. The area is bordered approximately by the Chicago River to the West, Lawrence Avenue to the South, and Clark Street to the East. The boundaries of the ward changed slightly before the 2015 election [see map].

== Aldermen ==
The ward is represented in the Chicago City Council by an alderman, a position that comes up for election every 4 years. In the 2019 election, Andre Vasquez, a Democratic Socialist, won 54% of the vote to become the alderman of the 40th Ward.

Alderperson	Term in office	Party	Notes	Cite
Christ A. Jensen		Democratic		
John William Chapman	1927–1929	Republican		
Joseph C. Ross		Republican		
Samuel Gurman				
Benjamin M. Becker				
Seymour Simon	1971–1975			
Nathan J. Kaplan				
Seymour Simon				
Solomon Gutstein	1975–1979			
Ivan Rittenberg	1979–1983			
Patrick J. O'Connor	1982–2019	Democratic		
Andre Vasquez	2019–present	Democratic		

== Schools ==
The 40th Ward is home to a variety of public and private schools.

Chicago Public Schools:

- Budlong Elementary
- Chappell Elementary
- Clinton Elementary
- Jamieson Elementary
- Amundsen High School
- Mather High School

Private/religious schools:

- North Shore Junior Academy
- Rogers Park Montessori
- St. Hilary Catholic School
- St. Matthias School
- St. Phillips Lutheran School

== Police beats ==
Chicago is divided into 279 Chicago Police Department beats, eight of which are in the 40th Ward (see map). Each beat has a number. The first two digits signify the district; the next digit shows the sector number, and the last digit is the beat number. For example, Beat 2013 is the 20th District, 1st sector, 3rd beat. All patrol cars are labeled with a beat number displayed above the blue lights on the roof. Beats hold regular meetings that are open to the public, usually once a month, or every other month. The list of beat meetings is available on the 40th Ward website.

== Neighborhood organizations ==
The 40th Ward is made up of diverse communities, several of which have organized neighborhood groups. They include

- Heart of Lincoln Square Neighbors Association (HOLS)
- Bowmanville Community Organization (BCO)
- Greater Rockwell Organization (GRO)
- West Andersonville Neighbors Together (WANT)
- Winnemac Park Neighbors (WPN)
