= Goodstein =

Goodstein is a surname. It is the surname of:

- Anastasia Goodstein, American web content producer and author
- David Goodstein (1939–2024), American physicist, married to Judith
- David B. Goodstein (1932–1985), American publisher and LGBT activist
- Eban Goodstein (born 1960), American economist
- Judith R. Goodstein (born 1939), American historian of science, married to David
- Reuben Goodstein (1912–1985), English mathematician and philosopher of mathematics

== Origins ==
Goodstein is a part-translation from the name Gutstein, a German-origin name with gut meaning good, and Stein meaning stone.
