= Lawrence Kutner =

Lawrence Kutner may refer to:

- Lawrence Kutner (psychologist), American child and media psychologist
- Lawrence Kutner (House), a fictional character in the TV series House, M.D.
