= Gutstein =

Gutstein is a German surname, literally meaning "good stone". Notable people with the surname include:

- Adam Gutstein, American business executive
- Ernst Gutstein (1924–1998), Austrian operatic baritone
- Daniel Gutstein (born 1968), American writer
- Rabbi Morris Aaron Gutstein (1905–1987), American rabbi
- Solomon Gutstein (born 1934), American author, authority on Illinois Real Estate Law, and Alderman
