= Diamond Management & Technology Consultants =

Former Chicago-based consulting company

- Company type: Public
- Traded as: Nasdaq: DTPI
- Industry: Management consulting
- Founded: 1994; 32 years ago
- Headquarters: Chicago, Illinois
- Key people: Adam Gutstein (president and CEO)
- Products: Management consulting
- Revenue: USD 169 Million (2007)
- Number of employees: more than 600 consultants worldwide

Diamond Management & Technology Consultants was an independent management consulting firm founded in 1994, headquartered in Chicago, Illinois with satellite offices in Hartford, Connecticut, New York City, Washington DC, London, and Mumbai. It was acquired by the British firm, PwC in 2010. Diamond was a smaller player among companies such as Mercer Management Consulting, Deloitte Consulting, and Accenture. The industry segments under which Diamond operated include consumer packaged goods, financial services, and health care, among numerous others.

== History ==
Diamond was founded as Diamond Technology Partners in Chicago in 1994 by Mel Bergstein and Chris Moffitt with investment from founding partners and Safeguard Scientifics. The firm went public in early 1998. On 2000-11-28 the company was renamed to DiamondCluster International, Inc. as part of a merger with European management consulting firm Cluster Consulting. In 2006, the company was again renamed, this time to Diamond Management & Technology Consultants, Inc. as it divested portions of its international operations. As of 3 November 2010, Diamond Management & Technology Consultants was acquired by PwC and renamed into Diamond Advisory Services. Before the acquisition, Diamond had also acquired few boutique consulting firms in US.

Diamond had, throughout its history, well-defined relationships with major technology pioneers such as Alan Kay, a member of the board of directors, as well as John Perry Barlow, Gordon Bell, David P. Reed, Dan Ariely, Matthew Peterson and Dan Bricklin, all regular faculty members of the privately branded industry conference called Diamond Exchange.

From 1998 to 2003, the company published an industry magazine named Context Magazine, the premiere issue of which included an interview with Microsoft founder Bill Gates.

On November 2, 2010, PricewaterhouseCoopers acquired Diamond for $12.50 per share in cash. Diamond now operates as a homogeneous component of PwC's Advisory Services.
