= Dana Klisanin =

Psychologist, futurist, and author

- Education: Ph.D. Psychology, Saybrook University
- Occupations: Psychologist, Futurist, Children's Author
- Notable work: Future Hack (children's novel); Cyberhero League (interactive adventure game)
- Website: https://www.danaklisanin.com/

Dana Klisanin is a psychologist, futurist, and author best known for her research and writing in the field of digital altruism and the impact of the digital era on heroism. Her research was recognized in 2012 by the American Psychological Association with an award for Early Career Scientific Contribution to Media Psychology. In 2017, Klisanin was the recipient of the President's Outstanding Woman Futurist Award, as recognized by the World Futures Studies Federation (WFSF). In 2020, Klisanin was named one Forbes' "50 Leading Female Futurists." As a novelist, Klisanin is the author of Future Hack, the first installment in a series entitled Chronicles of G.A.I.A.

== Biography ==
=== Education ===
Klisanin graduated from Arkansas Tech University in 2003 with a B.A. in psychology. She holds a Ph.D. in psychology from Saybrook University. At Saybrook she studied evolutionary systems design with Bela H. Banathy. She also worked with humanistic psychologist, Stanley Krippner.

== Career ==
=== Research ===
==== Current studies ====
Klisanin's scholarship is characterized by a transdisciplinary attention to theory building, influenced by systems science, transpersonal studies, and integral theory. While much of her previous research has been situated at the nexus of psychology and future studies, more recent work is concentrated on existential risk.

In the field of existential risk, Kilsanin's research explores expanding the mental health paradigm from a focus on resilience to that of antifragility. Such expansion is necessary, Klisanin argues, to prepare the psyche for the impacts of climate change and other cascading global crises. The research draws upon antifragility described by Nicholas Nassim Taleb and research in post-traumatic growth. In the field of psychology, similarly, Klisinan has recently focused on the antifragile mindset and rewilding the human psyche.

==== Research history ====
While attending Saybrook University, Klisanin began researching the potential of Information and Communication Technology (ICTs) to promote the development of higher stages of human consciousness and planetary flourishing. She applied systems science and design theories and methodologies to design an impact media framework. Later, she began investigating the positive uses of the Internet and exploring "digital altruism", which she defined as "altruism mediated by digital technology", and divided it into three categories: everyday digital altruism, creative digital altruism, and co-creative digital altruism.

In 2009, after studying the characteristics of people who engaged in digital altruism, Klisanin defined a new form of the hero archetype, the "cyberhero", an individual who repeatedly uses digital technology to help other people, animals, and the planet, by contributing to world peace, social justice, environmental protection, and/or planetary stewardship.

In 2010, Klisanin applied Ken Wilber's integral theory, to her previous media framework, which she called "Integral media", and defined as the "conscious creation, use, and evaluation of media that aims to guide the evolutionary development of the body, mind, and spirit, in self, culture, and nature."

In the latter part of the 2010s, Klisanin studied the evolution of humanism in networked society, theorizing the concept of "collaborative heroism" to reference in-person and online activities that happen simultaneously and aim to achieve heroic goals. Reflecting on the global connectivity of the contemporary networked society, Klisanin defined heroism in terms of global goals such as those set out in the Articles of the Universal Declaration of Human Rights or the Earth Charter.

=== Game design and media consulting ===
In addition to her research, Kilsanin is known for the development of an interactive adventure game, Cyberhero League, designed to promote the cyberhero archetype in society. The game, selected as a winner of the World Future Society's BetaLaunch Technology competition, enables players to learn about and tackle global challenges through completing apprenticeships with partnering nonprofit organizations. She is the founder and CEO of Evolutionary Guidance Media R&D, Inc. and director of the MindLab at the Center for Conscious Creativity.

=== Major awards ===
In 2012, Klisanin received the Early Career Award for Scientific Achievement in Media Psychology from the Media Psychology division of the American Psychological Association for her research in positive media, digital altruism, and the cyberhero archetype. In 2017, she received the President's Outstanding Women Futures Award from the World Futures Studies Federation, for advancement of the philosophies, theories, methods and practices that strengthen and enrich the field of futures studies.

=== Professional contributions ===
Klisanin serves on the News Media, Public Education and Public Policy Committee, and the Media Watch Video Game Committee for the American Psychological Association's Division of Media Psychology.

== Selected publications ==
- "Heroism in the Networked Society". Handbook of Heroism and Heroic Leadership. Edited by Scott T. Allison. New York: Routledge. (2017).
- "Collaborative heroism: An empirical investigation". Heroism Science, 1 (1), 1-14. (2016).
- "The Hero and the Internet: Exploring the Emergence of the Cyberhero Archetype". Media Psychology Review. (2012).
- "Exploring the design of conscious media". Futures. 42 (10), 1119-1125. doi:10.1016/j.futures.2010.08.012. (2010).
- "Postformal-Integral-Planetary Scholarship: Insights from the Integral Futures Controversy". Journal of Integral Theory and Practice. 6 (2). 149-156. (2011).
- "Evolutionary Guidance Media: An Integral Framework for Foresight Communication". Journal of Futures Studies. 17 (1). 99-106. (2012).
- "A grand synergy: Applying the integral operating system to evolutionary guidance media". Journal of Integral Theory and Practice. 5 (4). (2010).
- "Archetypes of Change in a Digital Age", The Noetic Post, Institute of Noetic Sciences.
- "Is the Internet giving rise to new forms of Altruism?" Media Psychology Review. (2011).
- "Transception: The Dharma of Evolutionary Guidance Media". In J. Wilby (ed), Integrated Systems Sciences: Systems Thinking, Modeling and Practice. Proceedings of the 51st Annual Conference of the International Society for the Systems Sciences, Tokyo, Japan. (2007).
