= Engagement Skills Trainer =

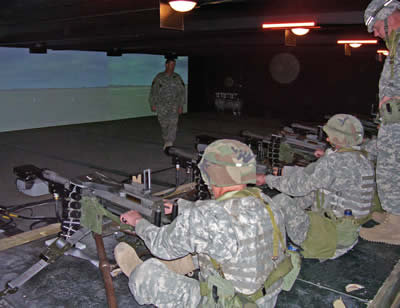
Engagement Skills Trainer

The Engagement Skills Trainer is a simulator that provides marksmanship training and trains soldiers on virtually all aspects of firearms training from calibrating weapons, to weapons qualification, to collective fire scenarios in numerous environments.

== Users ==
- Jordan
- Kyrgyzstan
- Lebanon: The Lebanese Armed Forces operate five 10-lanes systems.
- United States

== See also ==
- Boot Camp
- Multi-purpose Arcade Combat Simulator
