= Multi-purpose Arcade Combat Simulator =

American training simulator

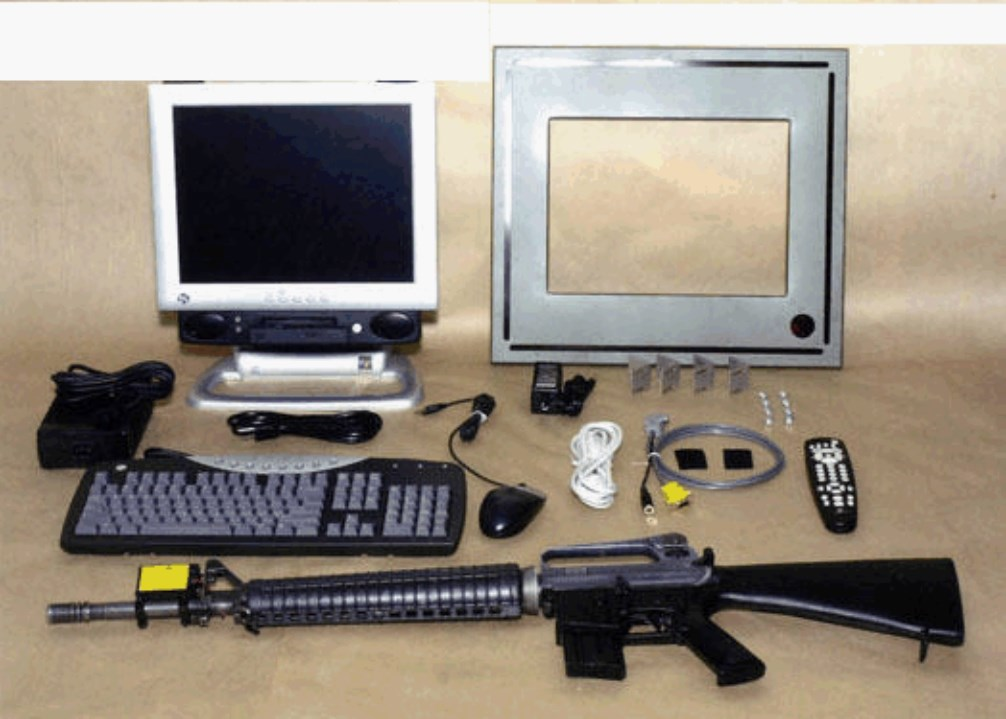
- Components of a MACS kit in 2009
- Type: Virtual firearms training simulator
- Place of origin: United States

Production history
- Designer: Army Research Institute; James Schroeder
- Designed: 1982
- Manufacturer: Litton Industries (C64); Sculptured Software (SNES); Army Training Support Center (MACS 2000)

The Multi-purpose Arcade Combat Simulator (MACS) (Note: The hyphen is omitted in some official documents.) (Note: It is sometimes known as Multi-Purpose Arcade Combat Simulator) is an American marksmanship training simulator for the M16 rifle. It was created in the 1980s by the US Army Research Institute (ARI; now DEVCOM ARL) to create low-cost simulators, which were continuously revised as arcade technology improved.

MACS was still in use by the US military as recently as the 2000s. The MACS SNES cartridges are deemed rare to acquire in the used game market.

== Overview ==
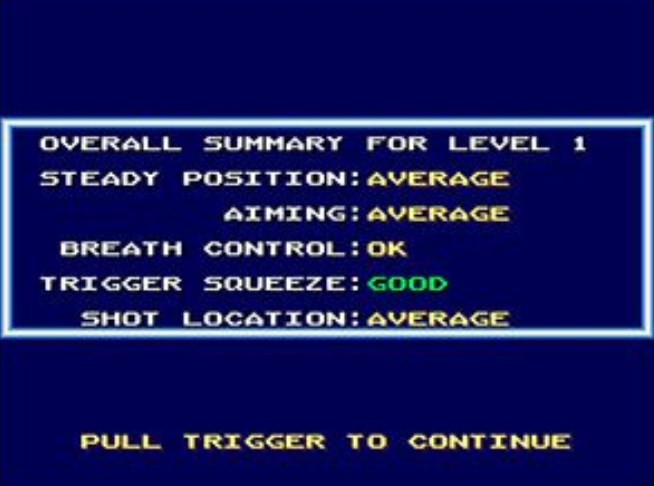
Screenshot of MACS 1994 showing the stats of the user after completing a stage.

Development of MACS was done to provide low-cost simulators for part-time training. Among the concerns the US Army looked at was the increasing cost of using live ammunition for target practice with a decreasing cost of microcomputers.

MACS would be used in US military training programs and by various ROTC units. A few unnamed countries evaluated the MACS for potential use as military training tools. Spanish language versions were provided with assistance from the School of the Americas.

It consists of a microcomputer, a light pen attached to any demilitarized weapon, and a color video monitor. It also includes a training manual.

=== Rifles ===
MACS used M16-based rifles that served as the light gun. They are also used to help soldiers practice marksmanship, including how to zero the rifles.

A replica of the Jäger AP-74 was used as the basis of the MACS light gun. There were instances of demilitarized Jäger AP-74s, Model Gun Corporation (MGC) M16 model guns, demilitarized Colt M16A1s/M16A2s and rubber M16s used as MACS light guns.

== Development ==
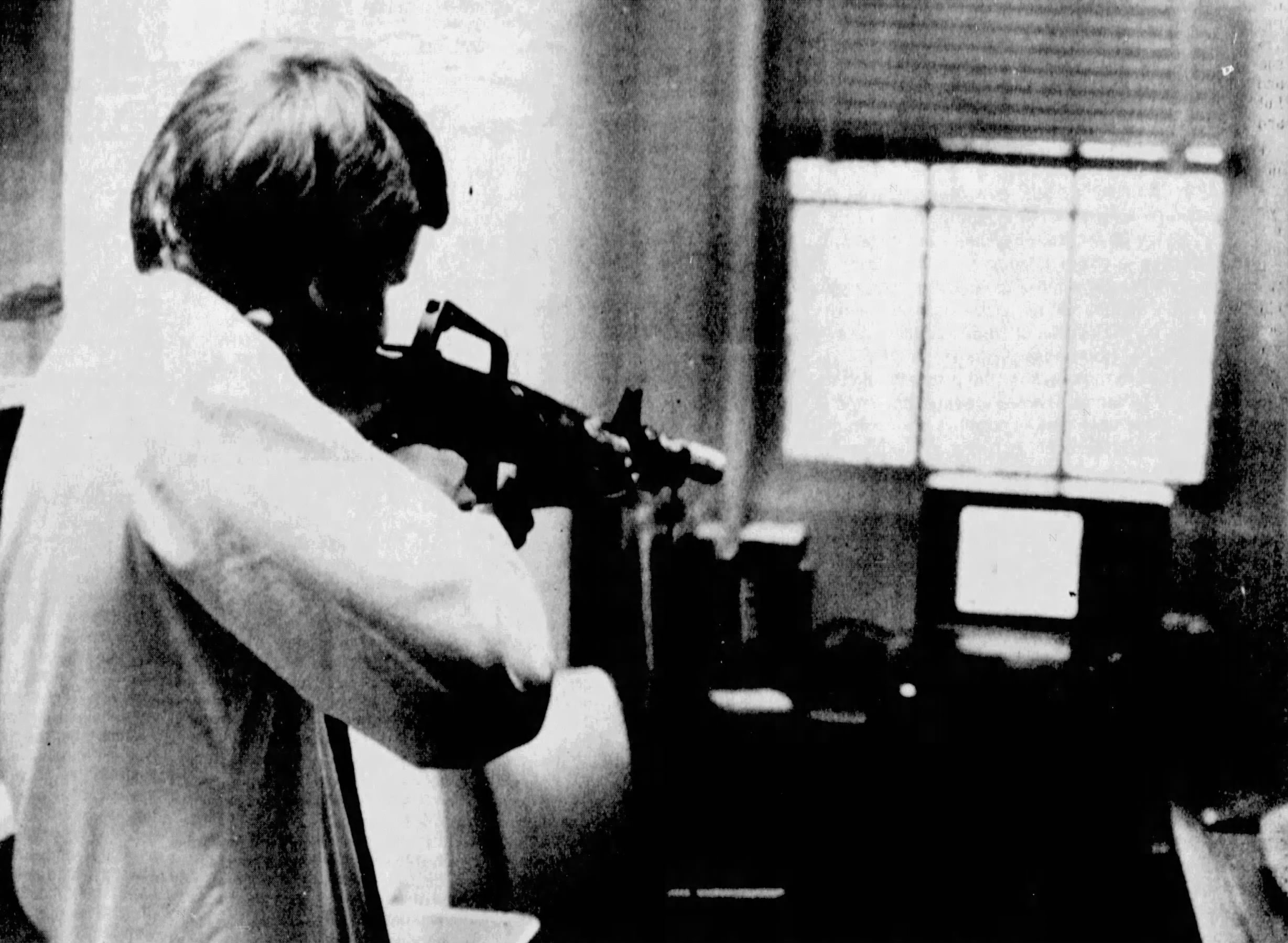
James Schroeder demonstrates a MACS prototype in 1982

James Schroeder began developing MACS in 1982. The first versions used the Apple II Plus microcomputer and supported the M16A1 and M72A2 LAW. Students pointed a weapon with an attached light pen toward a computer display, which could simulate moving people and tanks at varying distances. The available light pen technology was not accurate enough at the distances MACS needed, so new lensed light pens were developed by the Naval Training Systems Center (NTSC). The US Army filed a patent for MACS in 1984 and it was granted in 1986.

There were plans to add support for an ambitious array of weapons (Note: Weapons that were being considered aside from the M16A1 and the LAW included the M203 grenade launcher, M60 machine gun, the M47 Dragon, the TOW, the M1911A1, the M249 SAW, M202A1 FLASH and the Browning M2HB.) (hence, "multi-purpose") but only the M16A1, M72A2 LAW and M203 were selected for further research. Later on, the scope narrowed further to only support the M16A1.

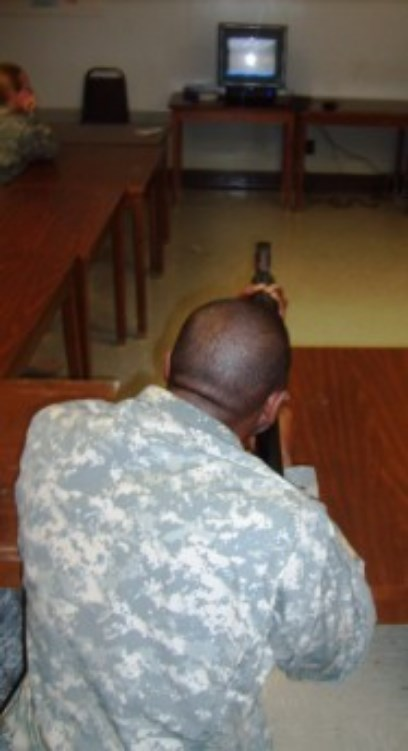
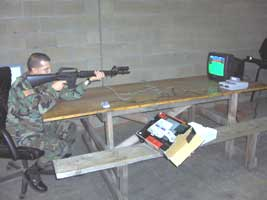
Soldiers training with earlier versions of MACS for Commodore 64 (left) and SNES (right)

Litton Industries engineers ported MACS to the Commodore 64 in c. 1986. The program was patented in the same year. Sponsorship for MAC research came from the US Army Infantry School under a Memorandum of Understanding from December 9, 1987. Following growing interests from the US Navy, US Air Force and the US Coast Guard to potentially use the MACS, a program known as the Joint Service Multipurpose Arcade Combat Simulator (JMACS) was created from 1986, which was sponsored by the Joint Services Program on Manpower and Training Technology Development. The JMACS Project funded development of new light pens, purchase of 25 MACS systems with demilitarized M16A1s for the US Navy and US Air Force and acquisition of more demilitarized M16A1s from Anniston Army Depot.

Testing for programming simulated recoil was conducted from August 1987 to September 1988 with MACS after some instructors complained about the lack of a recoil mechanism. In a 1989 report filed by Kenneth Evans, he said that having a recoil mechanism is not recommended since it would add further costs to develop MACS and it does not the user's performance. He also said that simulated recoil is not needed as long as "live firing is a substantial part of the overall training strategy".

In 1991, ARI investigated the capabilities of the new Super Nintendo Entertainment System (SNES) and commissioned Sculptured Software to reimplement MACS on it; There were plans to further develop MACS programming to include stages for training users to use M16s with various scopes and sight, but delays of having scopes selected before the end of 1991 for the M16A2 by the US Army led to delays to implement it, which led to said programming being cancelled. The switch provided better graphics at lower cost and multiple SNES cartridges were made for different courses. Nintendo denies any involvement in MACS production.

The next version of MACS was MACS 2000, developed by the US Army Training Support Center's Fielded Devices Division.

== Relation to video games ==
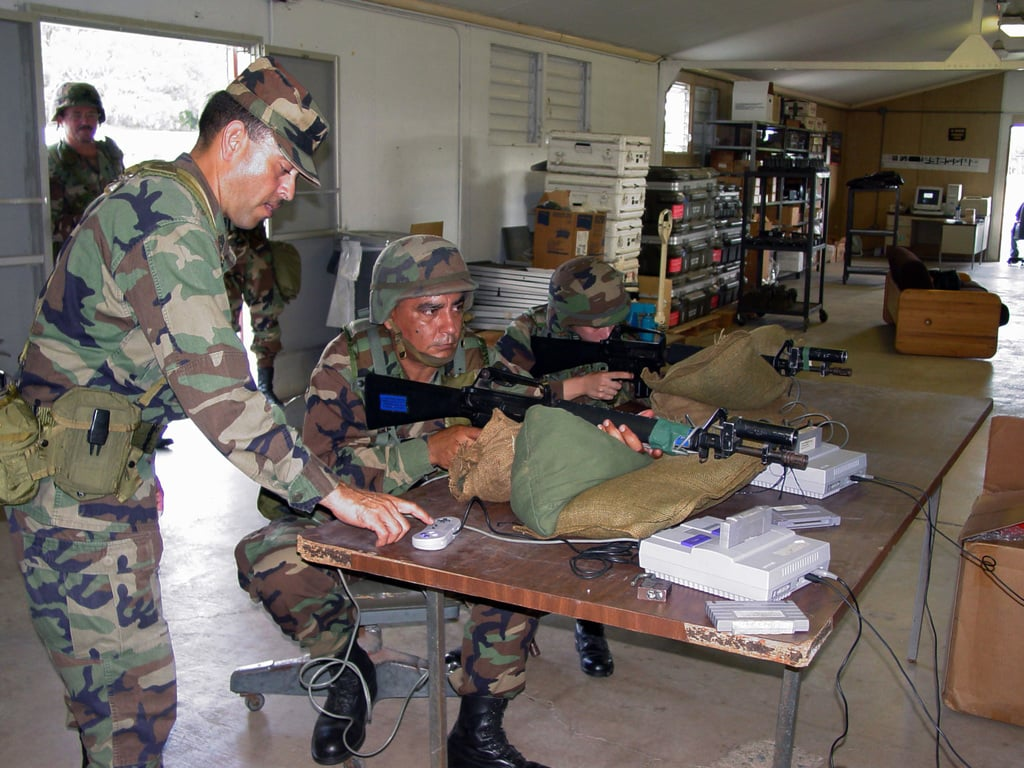
A MACS instructor reaches for a SNES controller.

Though MACS is an effective marksmanship trainer, journalists have frequently noted its video game-like appearance. Even in the earliest versions, the melody of "Thanks for the Memory" plays when a tank appears. In particular, the SNES port included an obvious Nintendo console and colorful graphics. Soldiers referred to it as "the video game" and used MACS for recreation in addition to training.

According to retired lieutenant colonel and MACS instructor Dave Grossman, MACS shows that video games can be used for "teaching people to kill". Advocating against violent video games, he claims that arcade video games like Time Crisis could also "develop the skill and will to kill" in players. Retired colonel Ron Krisak, who led the Fort Dix training technology lab in the 1990s, thought it improbable that a light gun game could produce a skilled marksman without an instructor.

SNES cartridges for MACS have been sold to video game collectors for high prices.

== See also ==
- Duck Hunt
- Engagement Skills Trainer
- Super Scope
