= Teena Willoughby =

Canadian developmental psychologist

Academic background
- Education: BA, Psychology, University of Western Ontario; MA, 1991, PhD, 1993, University of Waterloo
- Thesis: The interaction between knowledge base and elaboration strategies. (1993)

Academic work
- Institutions: Brock University
- Website: brockadolescentdevelopmentlab.ca

Teena Willoughby is a Canadian developmental psychologist.

== Early life and education ==
Willoughby earned her Bachelor of Arts degree in psychology from the University of Western Ontario before enrolling at the University of Waterloo for her Master's degree and PhD.

== Career ==
Upon receiving her PhD, Willoughby joined the department of psychology at Brock University in 1995. As an assistant professor, she co-led a research project with Linda Rose-Krasnor aimed at studying children's language and literacy skills. The following year, Willoughby was appointed the inaugural director of the Brock Research Institute for Youth Studies (BRIYS) and received over $4 million in research funding to study youth development. As a result of her knowledge of youth development, Willoughby and Eileen Wood were asked to co-edit Anastasia Goodstein's media education resource Totally Wired in 2008. She also received Brock's inaugural Graduate Mentorship Award in 2011.

Beginning in 2011, Willoughby started to study the long term effects video games had on childhood development. She co-authored a lab-controlled study with Paul J. C. Adachi titled The effect of video game competition and violence on aggressive behavior: Which characteristic has the greatest influence? The study followed 42 college students as they played Conan Exiles, a violent game, or Fuel, a competitive game, for 12 minutes. They concluded that competitiveness, not violence, in video games may influence aggressive behavior. She collaborated with Adachi again in 2013 to complete a longitudinal, self-report study covering 1,771 high school students over four years. The paper, titled Demolishing the Competition: The Longitudinal Link Between Competitive Video Games, Competitive Gambling, and Aggression, re-affirmed their previous studies results that competition results in aggressive behavior, not violence. Encouraged by their findings, Adachi and Willoughby began to study the effects sports video games had on youth behavior. They found that youths who played sports video games were more likely to join them in real life.

As a result of Willoughby's research, the Canadian Institutes of Health Research granted her $1.43 million to study youth risk-taking in 2016.
