= Cyberhero =

Form of the hero archetype

The Cyberhero is a form of the hero archetype that represents individuals who use the Internet and digital technologies to act on behalf of other people, animals, and the environment with the goal of achieving humanity's highest ideals and aspirations, including world peace, social justice, environmental protection, and planetary stewardship. The archetype was first introduced in 2010 by psychologist, Dana Klisanin. Her research indicates that individuals embodying the archetype embrace paradox and feel interconnected with the larger web of life. Examples of people embodying the Cyberhero archetype include individuals who participate in social media campaigns, online petition sites, and interactive games, that are designed to improve social and environmental conditions in the world. The Cyberhero archetype is the antithesis to cyberbullying and other forms of cyber-crime.

== See also ==
- Internet activism
- Internet vigilantism
- Online social movement
- User revolt
- WatchDogs
