= Grand Theft Childhood =

Book by Lawrence Kutner and Cheryl K. Olson

Grand Theft Childhood: The Surprising Truth About Violent Video Games and What Parents Can Do
- Author: Lawrence Kutner; Cheryl K. Olson
- Language: English
- Subject: Psychology of violent videogames
- Genre: Non-fiction
- Publisher: Simon & Schuster
- Publication date: April 15, 2008
- Publication place: United States
- Media type: Print, e-book
- Pages: 272
- ISBN: 978-0-7432-9951-0
- OCLC: 173367486
- Dewey Decimal: 302.23/1 22
- LC Class: HQ784.V53 K88 2008

Grand Theft Childhood: The Surprising Truth About Violent Video Games and What Parents Can Do is a book by Lawrence Kutner and Cheryl K. Olson. Along with psychiatrist Eugene V. Beresin, Kutner and Olson are co-directors of the Harvard Medical School Center for Mental Health and Media, a division of the department of psychiatry at Massachusetts General Hospital.

== Background ==
The book was based in part on original research funded by the Office of Juvenile Justice and Delinquency Prevention, U.S. Department of Justice to the Center for Mental Health and Media. The book's title is a play on the Grand Theft Auto series, a video game series that has attracted a great deal of controversy.

In contrast to previous studies that focused on potential harmful effects of violent video game play and links to real-life violence, Kutner and Olson take a more nuanced view of how video games influence young teens. The authors found previous research (including experimental studies on college students) of little help to parents, teachers, pediatricians or policymakers concerned about potential risks from video game play. They also suggest that potential benefits of video games (including some games with violent content) has not received enough attention. Their program of research included a school-based survey of 1,254 children in grades 7 and 8, a survey of 500 of their parents, and focus groups with adolescent boys and their parents.

Kutner and Olson first looked at what behaviors are normal for young adolescents today, including what games they play, where, how much, with whom, and why. They then looked for patterns of play associated with a higher risk of everyday problems of concern to parents. Because it is not possible to show cause and effect with a one-time survey, the authors focused on identifying "markers" of increased risk for problems.

The authors described their findings as both "encouraging, and at times disturbing". As they reviewed their data as well as reports by other researchers, they concluded that "parents, politicians, researchers and child advocates probably worry too much about the wrong things, and too little about more subtle issues and complex effects that are much more likely to affect our children" (page 18).

In an interview, Olson explained why they chose to write a popular book in addition to their academic publications: "We felt it was important to give intelligent people who haven't been involved in research a chance to see how media violence studies are planned, carried out and interpreted so they could judge for themselves what makes sense. We also wanted to share insightful comments made by teens about the role of video games in their lives, and the specifics of parents' concerns."

== Summary of book contents ==
- Chapter 1 looks at fears and myths about violent video games (including their purported role in school shootings) and introduces the research.
- Chapter 2 puts concerns about video game violence into context with panics over effects of earlier media (including paperback novels, gangster films and comic books).
- Chapter 3 explains how media violence research is actually carried out, and why various experts strongly disagree on its effects.
- Chapter 4 describes the results of the authors' research, including what games 13-year-olds play, and correlations between certain game play patterns and aggressive behavior or school problems.
- Chapter 5 reviews research on what attracts children to violent video games.
- Chapter 6 goes beyond the issue of game violence to examine sexual content in games, web-based games by hate groups, "advergames", and game addiction concerns.
- Chapter 7 looks at game rating systems around the world, and what parents want from a rating system.
- Chapter 8 looks at the politics of video games and the motivations behind and failure of efforts to regulate games.
- Chapter 9 reviews parent concerns and provides specific advice on minimizing harm and maximizing benefits from children's video game play.

== Conclusions ==
In their school-based surveys, Kutner and Olson found that games rated Mature by the ESRB were commonly played among young adolescents; 68% of boys and 29% of girls had at least one M-rated title among five games played "a lot" during previous six months. Among boys, games in the Grand Theft Auto series were by far the most popular. Most of boys' top games, however, were sports or Teen-rated fantasy games. Among girls, The Sims series was most popular, but Grand Theft Auto claimed second place. The rest of the girls' top ten were nonviolent games such as Mario titles, Dance Dance Revolution or simulation games.

The surveys also found correlations between violent gameplay and some common childhood problems. Boys who played any Mature-rated game a lot had twice the risk of certain aggressive behaviors (e.g., getting into fights, beating up someone, damaging property for fun) or school problems (e.g., getting in trouble with a teacher, getting poor grades), at least once during the past year, compared to boys who played games with lower age ratings. Among girls, the risk of problems was three to four times higher for those who played violent games vs. those who played other games.

Boys who did not play any video games during a typical week also had a higher chance for problems; however, there were not enough boys in this group to find statistically significant differences. Kutner and Olson stress that a one-time survey cannot show causality (it could be that already-aggressive teens prefer violent games, for example) and that most children who play violent games do not have problems. They also document many creative, social and emotional benefits from video game play—even games with violent content—which were used by many children to relieve stress and get out anger.

Ultimately, the authors express concern that "focusing on such easy but minor targets as violent video games causes parents, social activists and public-policy makers to ignore the much more powerful and significant causes of youth violence that have already been well established, including a range of social, behavioral, economic, biological and mental-health factors" (page 190).

In an April 16, 2008 interview on X-Play, Kutner and Olson noted that although some studies have claimed to show a link between video games and violent or aggressive behavior, most research in this area has been flawed. Some studies dating back to the 1980s looked at now-vintage arcade games that do not remotely resemble modern video games. Some studies followed the behavior of only a few dozen children. Many of the studies do not define what constitutes violent or aggressive behavior, and many confuse short-term and long-term effects. Many also use poorly validated measures of aggression, that likely do not correlate well with real-life aggressive acts of interest to most parents and politicians.

"You'll sometimes see kids coming out of an action movie making kung fu moves against one another", said Kutner, as an example of the type of thinking behind some of the studies they looked at. "But that doesn't mean they're going to do that against the sweet little old lady down the street," he said.

== Impact ==
The impact of Grand Theft Childhood has involved forming diverse attitudes about video game violence effects. The issue of video game violence has been contested among scholars, and Grand Theft Childhood has been one part of an increasing wave of skepticism among some scholars regarding the existence of meaningful, consistent negative effect on children of playing violent video games. Other scholars have referenced the book as indicating the need for a more nuanced view of the psychological effects of playing videogames. Reaction to the book has been mixed among scholars, often breaking along pre-existing ideological lines of belief about effects.
