= Christopher Ferguson (psychologist) =

American psychologist and writer

Christopher J. Ferguson
- Education: Stetson University; Florida International University; University of Central Florida
- Awards: Distinguished Early Career Professional Award from Division 46 of the American Psychological Association (2013)
- Scientific career
- Fields: Psychology
- Institutions: Stetson University
- Thesis: Development and validation of a defendant and offender screening tool for psychopathology in inmate populations (2003)
- Doctoral advisor: Charles Negy
- Website: christopherjferguson.com

Christopher J. Ferguson is an American psychologist who serves as a professor and co-chair of psychology at Stetson University in Florida. He previously served as an associate professor of psychology and criminal justice at Texas A&M International University. In 2014, he was named a fellow of the American Psychological Association. Ferguson is also a published author who has written both fiction and nonfiction.

== Education ==
Ferguson received his B.A. in psychology from Stetson University, his M.S. in developmental psychology from Florida International University, and his Ph.D. in clinical psychology from the University of Central Florida.

== Research and views ==
Ferguson is known for publishing studies disputing the link between video games and violent behavior. He has argued that violent video games have remained popular even while youth violence has fallen to a 40-year low. In 2008, Ferguson criticized a study published by Craig A. Anderson that found a link between violent video games and aggression. Ferguson stated, in a letter to the editor of Pediatrics, that the study suffered from "weak results" and "misleading conclusions". Ferguson published a study in 2014 that found that although there was a correlation between media violence and homicide rates for the mid-20th century, this correlation broke down after the 1950s. He was recently an author in several papers, including two meta-analyses, arguing that the evidence against the use of physical punishment is exaggerated, and cautioning against the potential dangers of this.

== Publications ==
In 2014, Ferguson published the novel Suicide Kings. His first nonfiction book, Moral Combat: Why the War on Violent Video Games Is Wrong, coauthored with Patrick M. Markey and published in 2017 by BenBella Books, addresses his views on the link between video games and violent behavior. In 2020, Ferguson published How Madness Shaped History: An Eccentric Array of Maniacal Rulers, Raving Narcissists, and Psychotic Visionaries, which focuses on the way madness, or personality disorders, have affected a variety of global leaders and influential people throughout human history. He has also written a number of short stories, some of which have been published in magazines or anthology collections.
