= Jack Kent Cooke Foundation =

Private, independent education foundation

Coordinates: 39°4′30.7″N 77°28′22.2″W

- Formation: 2000; 26 years ago
- Founder: Jack Kent Cooke (1912–1997), with a bequest in his will
- Type: Scholarship foundation
- Executive Director: Giuseppe "Seppy" Basili
- Revenue: $133,297,496 (2014)
- Expenses: $39,182,203 (2014)
- Endowment: $641 million (July 2016)
- Website: jkcf.org

The Jack Kent Cooke Foundation is a private, independent foundation which provides scholarship programs to gifted students in the U.S. who have financial need. It offers academic advising and other support services to students from 8th grade to graduate school. Since 2000, it has awarded over $175 million in scholarships to nearly 2,300 students and more than $97 million in grants to organizations that serve gifted low-income students.

== History ==
The Jack Kent Cooke Foundation was launched in 2000, funded by a bequest from entrepreneur and sports team owner Jack Kent Cooke, who died in 1997. Cooke had to leave high school in Canada in 1930 before graduating in order to help support his family during the Great Depression. He later went on to amass a fortune and move to the United States, eventually acquiring the Washington Redskins football team.

In his will, Cooke made provisions for the sale of the Redskins and some of his other assets to create a foundation to help gifted students with financial need to afford a college education.

=== Leadership ===
The first executive director of the Jack Kent Cooke Foundation was Matthew J. Quinn, serving from 2000 to 2009, when Harvard University psychologist Lawrence Kutner succeeded him. Harold O. Levy, a former New York City schools chancellor, led the foundation from September 2014 through May 2018. Current Executive Director Giuseppe “Seppy” Basili assumed the role in June 2018. In February 2026, the organization announced that Basili will retire in June 2026 and Dr. Daniel Porterfield will take over as president and CEO starting in July 2026.

== Scholarships and awards ==
The Jack Kent Cooke Foundation has awarded more than $175 million in scholarship assistance to nearly 2,300 high school and college students.

Cooke College Scholars and Undergraduate Transfer Scholars can receive up to $40,000 annually to cover tuition, living expenses, books and fees. In addition, the students who hold these scholarships are eligible to apply for a graduate school scholarship worth up to $50,000 a year, which is renewable for up to four years. Cooke International Awards at the University of Oxford and University of Cambridge are worth up to $85,000 a year for graduate study.

Scholarships for high school, undergraduate and graduate students include academic advising, access to internship opportunities, funding for study abroad, and opportunities to network with other Cooke Scholars and alumni.

Here is a list of current Cooke Scholarship and Awards Programs:

- The Cooke Young Scholars Program serves students from 8th grade through high school with financial need who have earned all or mostly A grades since the 6th grade. The program has provided $21.7 million to help fund summer enrichment programs, extracurricular activities, educational travel, purchases of computers and other technology, individualized counselling to set academic goals, guidance on applying to colleges, and the costs of attending private and public high schools for 817 Young Scholars since 2001.
- The Cooke College Scholarship Program provides undergraduate scholarships to high school seniors with financial need. The scholarships are available to 12th graders who have earned a cumulative unweighted grade-point average of at least 3.5, along with minimum SAT combined critical reading and math scores of at least 1200, or a minimum ACT composite score of 26. The Cooke Foundation has selected 622 College Scholars since 2006 and awarded $22.8 million in scholarship support.
- The Cooke Undergraduate Transfer Scholarship Program enables top community college students with financial need to complete their bachelor's degrees by transferring to selective four-year colleges or universities. Scholarships are available to current community college students or recent alumni who have earned a grade-point average of 3.5 or above. The Cooke Foundation has selected 808 Undergraduate Transfer Scholars since 2002 and awarded $34 million in scholarship support.
- The Cooke Graduate Scholarships have totalled $67.8 million for 673 students since 2002. In 2010 the award became available only to recipients of the Cooke College Scholarship and Cooke Undergraduate Transfer Scholarship.
- The Cooke International Awards at Oxford and Cambridge Universities are scholarships of up to $85,000 a year for a Cooke Scholar with financial need who has already received a bachelor's degree. The awards enable a scholar to pursue a graduate degree at Lincoln or Brasenose College at the University of Oxford or Clare College at the University of Cambridge, all in the United Kingdom. This program was launched in 2015 and expanded in 2016.
- The Matthew J. Quinn Prize, named to honor the Cooke Foundation's founding executive director, is a $10,000 award given annually to one or more Cooke Scholars currently in college or graduate school or Cooke alumni. The prize recognizes outstanding achievements, such as publication of an important work, development of an innovative solution to a societal problem, or creation of a useful community program.
- The Matthew J. Quinn Youth Leadership Award is a $5,000 prize given annually to one or more current Young Scholars recognizing outstanding achievement, such as creation of a significant community program.

== Cooke Prize ==
The Cooke Prize for Equity in Educational Excellence is a $1 million award given to an elite college or university with a record of admitting, supporting, and graduating outstanding low-income students.

The Cooke Prize was first awarded in 2015, going to Vassar College in New York. In 2016, the prize was awarded to Amherst College in Massachusetts.

In the 2015–16 academic year 23 percent of Vassar's freshmen were low-income students (those receiving federal Pell Grants). Nearly 25 percent of Amherst students were receiving Pell Grants.

== Grants ==
The Cooke Foundation awards grants to support strategic initiatives to expand educational opportunities for gifted, low-income students.

Grants to organizations working with such students in grades K-12 support programs that allow students to take extracurricular enrichment courses and thus prepare them for higher education.

Grants to colleges and universities provide funding for support programs that help low-income students adjust to college, succeed once enrolled and graduate on time. Grants fall into four broad categories: college access and excellence; academic achievement; artistic advancement; and local support.

== Research ==
In addition to operating its scholarship and grant programs, the Cooke Foundation conducts research on gifted students with financial need.

One of the foundation's studies, issued in early 2016, is called "True Merit: Ensuring Our Brightest Students Have Access to Our Best Colleges and Universities." The report concluded that top colleges and universities in the United States continue to use outdated and inaccurate measures of student ability to deny admission to many outstanding low-income students. The study found that 3 percent of students at the most selective schools come from the 25 percent of families with the lowest incomes. In contrast, 72 percent of students at the top schools come from the wealthiest 25 percent of the U.S. population.

Earlier research by the Cooke Foundation that examined the challenges faced by highly talented students with financial need includes:

- 2007 – "Achievement Trap: How America is Failing Millions of High-Achieving Students from Lower-Income Families" documented how students from families below the median income level who start school performing at high levels lose academic ground at every level of schooling. These students suffer a big drop in college when compared to wealthier students.
- 2014 – Partnerships That Promote Success: Lessons and Findings from the Evaluation of the Jack Kent Cooke Foundation's Community College Transfer Initiative" found that partnerships between two-year and selective four-year institutions increase the number of students who transfer, and that the transfer students perform well academically.
- 2015 – "Breaking Down Walls: Increasing Access to Four-Year Colleges for High-Achieving Community College Students" documented that many more community college students could succeed at four-year colleges and universities than are given the chance.
- 2015 – "Equal Talents, Unequal Opportunities: A Report Card on State Support for Academically Talented Low-Income Students" assessed the extent to which all 50 states have policies in place to close the K-12 Excellence Gap and offered recommendations to states.

== See also ==
- Corporate social responsibility
- Global Alliance for Improved Nutrition
- List of wealthiest charitable foundations
- Philanthropy
- Social enterprise
- Social entrepreneurship
- Social responsibility
