= Adam Gutstein =

American businessman and consultant

Adam J. Gutstein is an American business executive. He was the president, from 2004, and CEO, from 2006, of Diamond Management & Technology Consultants (DMTC) until its takeover by PWC. Gustein joined the company in 1994 as vice president. He has been a director of the company since 1999, and has held senior positions including that of chief operating officer.

Gutstein co-founded Diamond Technology Partners, the predecessor firm to Diamond Management and Technology Consultants, in 1994. He is also a director of Healthaxis, Inc.

DMTC was taken over by PwC for $378m, Gustein transitioned to PwC, continuing to lead the team.

Gutstein was listed as one of the industry's "top 25 most influential consultants" and Diamond was subject of a monograph in the 25 Top Consulting Firms Insider Guide series.
