= Cheryl K. Olson =

Health and behavior researcher

Cheryl K. Olson is a health and behavior researcher. She has done work researching the influence of media on childhood development and psychological well-being, and focuses on the relationship between childhood use of video games and violent behavior.

Olson completed her undergraduate degree in communications and earned master's degree in community health education from the University of Minnesota in 1986. She then earned a Doctor of Science degree in Health and Social Behavior at the Harvard School of Public Health in 1995, as well as a Postdoctoral European Certificate in Pharmaceutical Medicine from the University of Basel. Olson served as a faculty member of Psychiatry at Harvard Medical School for 15 years and as an assistant clinical professor of psychiatry at Massachusetts General Hospital. She also co-founded the Center for Mental Health and Media at Massachusetts General Hospital with Lawrence Kutner, PhD in 2000. She currently works as a researcher, educator, author, consultant, and media producer.

== Awards and grants ==
- $1.5 million in research funding from the US Department of Justice's Office of Juvenile Justice and Delinquency Prevention to study teenagers' video and computer game use
- $1 million in project funding from the National Institute on Drug Abuse to improve scientific reporting
- 2011 Future and Reality of Gaming (F.R.O.G.) Award, annual [Future and Reality of Gaming Conference
- Two-time CINE Golden Eagle Winner for documentary production Faces of Depression

== Research ==
=== Video game research ===
Funded by the US Department of Justice's Office of Juvenile Justice and Delinquency Prevention in 2004, Olson and Kutner steered a $1.5 million project investigating the use of computer and video games of 1,254 teenagers in South Carolina and Pennsylvania. Utilizing surveys and focus groups to collect data from teenage gamers and their parents, the study was the largest of its kind. Olson and Kutner suggest that the findings of this research project provide evidence against several stereotypes related to video gamers, including lack of social aptitude and physical activity, and also highlight parents' lack of awareness in their teenagers' gaming practices and factors that increase children's exposure to violent video games.

In addition to video game use, Olson and Kutner investigated the relationship between violent video games and violent behavior. Citing the findings of their research project, they conclude that violent video games are not inherently bad; instead, a multitude of factors related to both the game and the gamer may impact the potential outcome of video game use. Olson also argues that while video games rated for mature audiences are associated with a higher likelihood of violent behavior such as fighting, the relationship between violence video games and violent behavior may not be one of cause and effect and that the research sheds light on potential benefits of video game use, including development of problem-solving and strategic planning.

=== Smoking cessation and prevention ===
Olson has consulted on smoking cessation and prevention initiatives and conducted research on strategies to combat smoking using a behavioral approach. She also serves as a health behavior researcher and consultant for the QuitAssist project, funded by Philip Morris, which aims to provide informational support to adults looking to quit smoking.

== Select media ==
- Co-authored book with Kutner Grand Theft Childhood: The Surprising Truth About Violent Video Games and What Parents Can Do
- Co-authored with Eugene Beresin, M.D. Child and Adolescent Psychiatry and the Media (Elsevier).
- Ghostwriter of two New York Times best-selling books
- Directed and Edited documentary Faces of Depression
- Writer for Parents Magazine
- Guest on The Diane Rehm Show (WAMU/NPR).
