= Networked Society =

The Networked Society is a type of future ecosystem in which widespread internet connectivity drives change for individuals and communities. The concept has been popularized by the Information and Communications Technology (ICT) company Ericsson. Connectivity means a device can digitally communicate with and transfer data to other systems through a real-time communication network (typically the internet). It is expected that people living in the Networked Society will be able to use connectivity to improve their lives and businesses. New services in e-health, for example, will be driven by connectivity, mobility and cloud computing in the Networked Society.

== Origins ==
The Networked Society was first presented by Ericsson President and CEO Hans Vestberg in a YouTube video on August 26, 2011. The Networked Society concept has been discussed further in other videos, animations, infographics and articles.

On July 16, 2013, The Guardian published a video interview from the Activate London Summit 2013, where Vestberg explained how increasing connectivity will create access to information, services and communication that will transform society, business and the way we live our lives.

More recently, Ericsson CTO Ulf Ewaldsson described his vision of the Networked Society in a video interview with presenter Andrew Keen on the information technology website TechCrunch on August 6, 2013.
