= Solomon Gutstein =

American lawyer

Solomon Gutstein (born June 18, 1934) is an American lawyer and author and authority on Illinois Real Estate Law and he is the first ordained Rabbi to serve as Alderman (1975–1979) on the Chicago City Council of Chicago, Illinois.

== Early life and education ==
Gutstein was born to Rabbi Morris Gutstein and Golda Gutstein in Newport, Rhode Island. Gutstein moved with his parents and brother, Naftali Gutstein, to Chicago in 1943. He received his B.A. degree from the University of Chicago in 1953 and his J.D. in 1956. From 1955 to 1956, Gutstein was the associate editor of the University of Chicago Law Review. While at law school, he took classes at the Hebrew Theological College, and on July 31, 1956, Gutstein was ordained as a Rabbi by a Jewish orthodox Beit Din in New York City.

== Career and city council service ==
Gutstein was encouraged by his friend, Seymour Simon, to become more politically active. Gutstein ran for and won a seat as Alderman of the City Council in 1975, representing the 40th ward of Chicago. Though Gutstein did not emphasize his stature as Rabbi in his campaign, Mayor Richard J. Daley and the Cook County Democratic Party ("Democratic Party" or "the Party") supported his candidacy as the ward had been predominantly Jewish. In winning a seat on the Chicago City Council, Gutstein became the first ordained Rabbi to serve as Alderman.

Gutstein lost the 1979 election in a close race owing largely to his loss of Democratic Party support.

Gutstein resumed his legal practice full-time after his term ended as Alderman. In 1983, Gutstein began practicing of Illinois real estate law. In 1992, Gutstein merged his legal practice into Tenney and Bentley, LLC, where he now continues his real estate and business transaction practice. Gutstein was a lecturer in business law at the Booth School of Business of the University of Chicago and an adjunct professor in real estate at John Marshall Law School. He became a business mediator in 2012. He is a member of the Illinois Bar and the Federal District Court Trial Bar for the Northern District of Illinois.

== Personal life ==
On September 3, 1961, Gutstein married Carol G. Feinhandler. They were married until her death in 2014. They had four sons.

== Works ==
Books

- The Practice Systems Library: Illinois Real Estate, Parts 1 and 2, Lawyers Cooperative Publishing, 1983, updated through 1995.
- Illinois Practice Guide: Illinois Real Estate, Volumes 1 and 2, West Group, 1996, updated through 2000.
- Illinois Practice Series: Real Estate, Volumes 14 through 16 (co-authored with Eileen Murphy), Thomson Reuters, 2000, updated through 2008, updates co-authored with Joshua A. Gutstein 2009 through 2014.
- Judaism in Art (co-authored with Rabbi Morris A. Gutstein), Gutstein Family Trust, 1994.
- Illinois Construction Law (co-authored with Erwin Steiner), Professional Education Systems, Inc., 1981.
- Illinois Construction Law Update '82 (co-authored with Erwin Steiner with Erwin Steiner and Stanley P. Sklar), Professional Education Systems, Inc., 1982.
- Illinois Construction Law 1984 (co-authored with Stanley Sklar), Professional Education Systems, Inc., 1984.

Articles

- Post-Mortem Methods of Avoiding Probate, Winter 1972–73, Volume 22 No. 3, The Decalogue Journal
- Civil Enforceability of Religious Antenuptial Agreements, Volume 23 No. 1, Autumn 1955, The University of Chicago Law Review
- Commercial Real Estate Property Practice Chapter 4: Form of Taking and/or Holding Title to Real Estate, Illinois Institute for Continuing Legal Education (1972)
