= Lawrence Kutner (psychologist) =

American child psychologist

Lawrence "Larry" Kutner is a psychologist, nonprofit leader, public health consultant, academic researcher, journalist, entrepreneur, mentor, and sailing instructor. As an American child psychologist, he is best known as the author of the internationally syndicated "Parent & Child" column in the New York Times from 1987 to 1993. He is an Emmy award-winning television journalist and producer, and he wrote six books on child development.

He is a former member of the psychiatry faculty at Harvard Medical School's Massachusetts General Hospital where he spent 20 years. He is the co-founder and co-director of the Center for Mental Health and Media at Massachusetts General Hospital. In 2008, Kutner received an award for Distinguished Lifetime Contribution to Media Psychology from the American Psychological Association.

From 2009 to 2018, he was the executive director of the Jack Kent Cooke Foundation, where he reduced staff turnover, developed new programs for at-risk youth, and established the foundation's brand. After his time at Jack Kent Cooke Foundation, he served as the executive director of Stanford Pre-Collegiate Studies.

He worked with his wife, Dr. Cheryl K. Olson, consulting on issues related to public health and behavioral health. He served 15 years on the advisory board of the Carter Center for Mental Health Journalism at Emory University. Then, he served 4 years on the board of trustees of the Marine Science Institute.

Kutner holds a BA degree in psychology from Oberlin College, and a Ph.D. in Clinical Psychology from the University of Minnesota. He is trained at the Mayo Clinic. He is currently based in Richmond, Virginia.

== Works ==
- (2008) Grand Theft Childhood: The Surprising Truth About Violent Video Games and What Parents Can Do (co-authored by Cheryl Olson)
- (1998) Making Sense of Your Teenager (Parent & Child)
- (1997) Your School-Age Child: From Kindergarten Through Sixth Grade
- (1995) Toddlers & Preschoolers (The Parent & Child Series)
- (1994) Parent and Child: Getting Through to Each Other
- (1993) Pregnancy and Your Baby's First Year (The Parent & Child)
