= Seymour Simon =

American judge

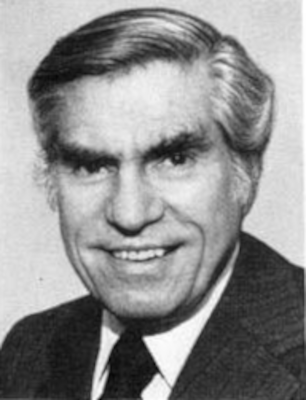
Simon's official photograph, c. 1975.

Seymour Frank Simon (August 10, 1915 – September 26, 2006) was an American lawyer, Appellate Court and Supreme Court Justice in Illinois, and City Council member (alderman) in Chicago, Illinois.

== Life ==
Simon was born in Chicago, and grew up in the Albany Park neighborhood. In 1931 he graduated from Theodore Roosevelt High School, and in 1935 from Northwestern University, having earned a bachelor of science degree. Simon also attended law school at Northwestern and graduated first in his class in 1938. He served in the United States Navy during World War II. In 1954, he married Roslyn Biel, a widow with three children.

== Political career ==
Simon was a member of the Democratic Party. His politics, however, were noted for being independent of the party line.

Simon served on the state Supreme Court from 1980 to 1988, and prior to that had been an Illinois appellate court judge from 1974 to 1980. According to the Chicago Sun-Times: "After nearly 20 years on the Council and the board, Simon was elected to the bench, where he served 14 years as an appellate court and Supreme Court justice. He became a staunch death penalty opponent and wrote a 1988 opinion that helped prevent wrongful executions for the 1983 Jeanine Nicarico slaying."

According to the Illinois Supreme Court website: "He served in the U.S. Navy, 1942–45, as attorney, U.S. Department of Justice (Antitrust Division), 1938–42, and practiced law in Chicago, 1946-74. He was elected alderman of Chicago's 40th Ward and served from 1955–61, when he was appointed to the Cook County Board, 1962-66. He served as president of Cook County Forest Preserve District during the same period and was a member of the Chicago Public Building Commission from 1961-1967. He was reelected to the Chicago City Council in 1967 and continued in that office until elected to the Appellate Court in 1974."

In 1995, Seymour Simon became the founding Chair of the Chicago Debate Commission, a 501(c)(3) non-profit which partners with Chicago Public Schools to administer the citywide Chicago Debate League. Seymour Simon steered the CDC for its first 11 years, until his death in 2006, and he was principally responsible for obtaining the initial investment of CPS in debate.

== Awards ==
Seymour Simon was inducted as a Laureate of The Lincoln Academy of Illinois and awarded the Order of Lincoln (the State’s highest honor) by the Governor of Illinois in 1997 in the area of Law.
