= Craig A. Anderson =

American professor and director

Craig A. Anderson is an American professor and director at the Department of Psychology, Iowa State University in Ames. He obtained his BA in psychology and sociology at Butler University and his MA and PhD in psychology at Stanford University in 1980.

He has carried out influential research regarding the effects of violent video games on children, and reports for parents related to this.

== Published research ==
Anderson wrote a book (2007) on Violent Video Games with co-authors Doug Gentile and Katherine Buckley. He has been a faculty member at Rice University (1980–1988), Ohio State University (visiting,1984–1985), and the University of Missouri (1988–1999). He joined Iowa State University in 1999 as Professor and Chair of the Department of Psychology. He has received teaching awards at both the graduate and undergraduate levels, and has been awarded "Fellow" status by the American Psychological Society and the American Psychological Association. His research has examined the potential association between violent content in video games and subsequent aggression. He is now on the Executive Council of the International Society for Research on Aggression. His research on human aggression has been published in various journals. A quote from one of his studies is, "The 14-year-old boy arguing that he has played violent video games for years and has not ever killed anybody is absolutely correct in rejecting the extreme "necessary and sufficient" position, as is the 45-year-old two-pack-a-day cigarette smoker who notes that he still does not have lung cancer. But both are wrong in inferring that their exposure to their respective risk factors (violent media, cigarettes) has not causally increased the likelihood that they and people around them will one day suffer the consequences of that risky behavior."

== Controversies ==
Dr. Anderson's critics say that his work overstates his results and fails to adequately acknowledge alternate views or limitations of the data on media violence. They also express concern that his claim of a definite causal link is not well supported by the existing data. Some of Anderson's studies were funded by the former National Institute on Media and the Family (NIMF), an advocacy group historically highly critical of the video game industry. In Brown v. Entertainment Merchants Association, the U.S. Supreme Court criticized Anderson's studies, noting that they "have been rejected by every court to consider them", "do not prove that violent video games cause minors to act aggressively", and "suffer from significant, admitted flaws in methodology".

Dr. Anderson's findings have been defended by other researchers in the field. Dr. Anderson and other colleagues of his have responded to the methodological criticisms of his work and the work of other researchers who have replicated his findings in the video game and aggression domain, although these debates continue.

== See also ==
- Video game controversy

== External links/sources ==
- Craig A. Anderson website Iowa State University
- Craig A. Anderson profile
- Craig A. Anderson 2003 Violent Video Games Science Briefs
- American Psychological Association Press release, 2000 Violent Video Games can Increase Aggression
- Violence and Video Games article
- BBC Report - Health - Video Games and Aggression
- Oxford University Press, Book Review, 2007 Violent Video Game Effects on Children and Adolescents: Theory, Research, and Public Policy Theories
- C.P. Barlet, C.A.Anderson, E.L.Swing, Simulation and Gaming, Vol. 40 (3), 2009 Video Game Effects-Confirmed, Suspected, and Speculative
