= Anastasia Goodstein =

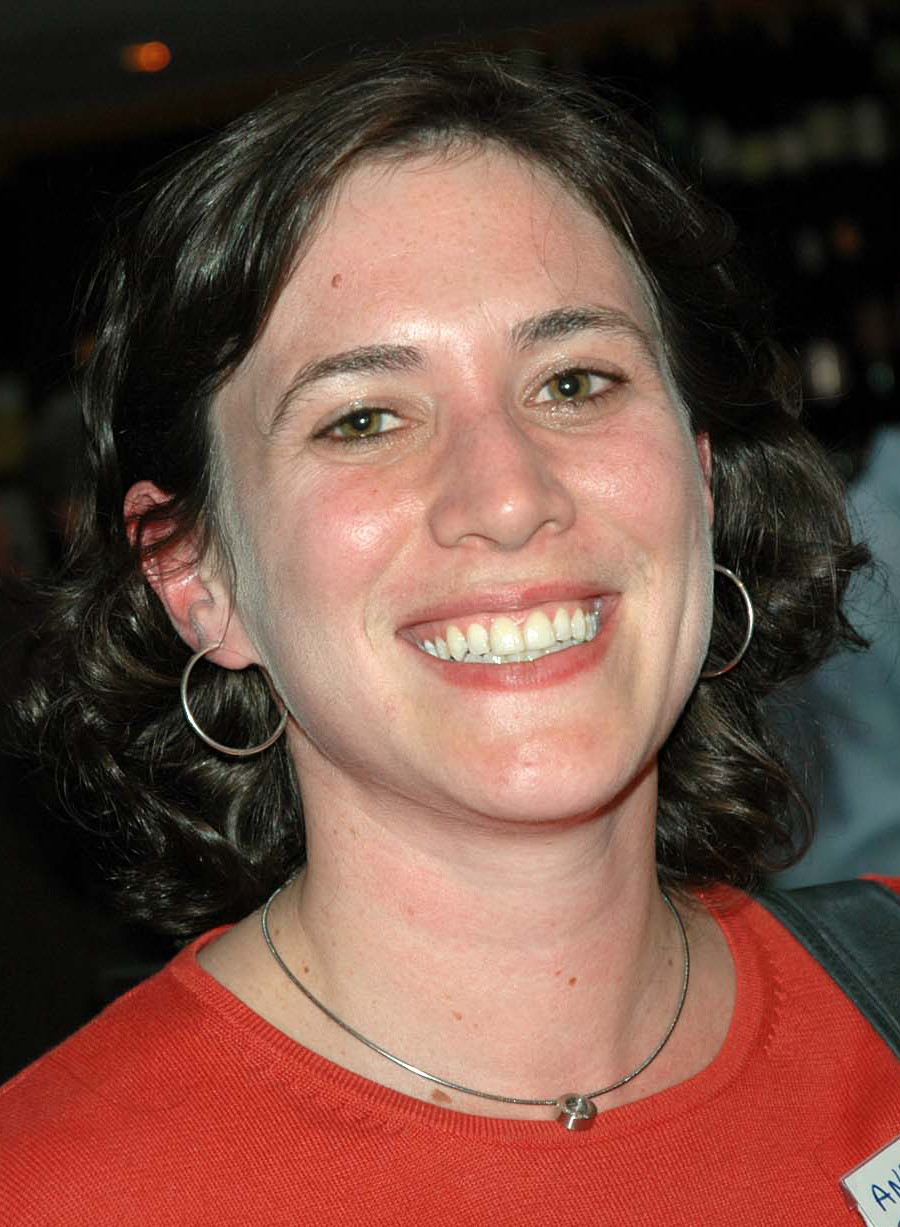
Goodstein in 2005

Anastasia Goodstein is the author of Totally Wired: What Teens and Tweens Are Really Doing Online (St.Martin’s Press), which was published March 20, 2007.

Anastasia graduated from Antioch College, with a B.A. in Journalism/Women's Studies in 1995. After graduating, she began her youth-media career at Teen Voices magazine, which was written by and for teen girls. Her interest in working with teens spurred her to do three years of extensive fundraising for Women Express, the organization that publishes Teen Voices. She even raised money to pay her own salary. Some of her fundraising projects included creating an annual event called Rhythm & Voices that combined readings from up-and-coming literary stars with live jazz.

After leaving the magazine she continued her education at the Medill School of Journalism at Northwestern University. She graduated in 1999 with an MSJ. She was one of the first three students to concentrate in New Media at Medill. After graduating from Medill, she moved to New York City to work at About.com and for Oxygen Media as an editorial Web producer. She left New York for Silicon Valley almost one year later to take a position as a managing editor at Kibu, which was a website for teen girls. After Kibu became a casualty of the bursting dot-com bubble, she went to work for AOL Web Properties as a senior editor, and then helped launch KeepMedia, a premium content service that delivered current and archived articles from 150+ popular magazines and newspapers on one website. Anastasia also worked at Current TV, a television network started in part by Al Gore, as a director in the Online Studio group.
