= Mikhail Rodionovich Matveyev =

Soviet security officer and executioner (1892–1971)

Mikhail Rodionovich Matveyev (Russian: Михаил Родионович Матвеев; 1892–1971) was a senior NKVD executioner, sent to begin the mass shootings at Sandarmokh in Karelia in the late 1930s.

== Youth ==
After completing two years of education at a village school, the young Matveyev moved to St Petersburg where he held various occupations: he was a doorman at an apartment block, for instance, before becoming in 1913 an assistant to a metal-worker at the Vulcan works. Following the 1917 February Revolution he joined the Bolsheviks and soon was serving as a Cheka executioner. In 1923 he took a few years away from his new occupation. From 1927 onwards Matveyev was back with the successor organisations, the OGPU and NKVD, as an executioner in the Leningrad Region.

== Condecoration ==
On 28 November 1936, together with two other future Sandarmokh executioners (A.P. Polikarpov and P.D. Shalygin)—and the notorious V.M. Blokhin—Captain Matveyev received the Order of the Red Banner for his "struggle to secure the socialist system", viz. they acted as executioners of those supposed to be its enemies.

== Sandarmokh, 1937-1938 ==
Matveyev was personally involved in the shooting of the prisoners of the "lost Solovki transport" between 27 October and 3 November 1937, who included many members of Ukraine's Executed Renaissance.

Among the victims of the mass executions carried out in the Sandarmokh forest were the Ukrainian writers Mykola Zerov, Mykola Kulish, Myroslav Irchan, Oleksa Slisarenko, Valerian Polishchuk, Pavlo Fylypovych, Valerian Pidmohylnyi, Mykola Voronyi, theatre director Les Kurbas, scientist Stepan Rudnytsky, founder of the USSR Hydrometeorological Service Oleksii Vangenheim, Crimean Tatar public figure İsmail Firdevs (in total, more than 280 people whose fates were connected with Ukraine).

Also executed there were the Russian lawyer A. Bobrishchev-Pushkin (defender of Menahem Mendel Beilis and Vladimir Purishkevich), founder of Udmurt literature Kuzebay Gerd, Belarusian minister F. Volynets, head of the Moscow Roma camp G. Stanesko, Georgian princes N. Eristov and Ya. Andronnikov, Catholic administrator of Georgia Sh. Batmalashvili, Circassian writer Kh. Abukov, Korean activist Tai Do, Orthodox bishops Alexiy, Damian (Voskresensky), Mykola and Petro, leader of the USSR Baptists V. Kolesnikov, and academic historian Nikolai Durnovo.

The Sandarmokh killing field was only found in July 1997 after lengthy searches and at first it was not known how many thousands had been shot and buried there. The identity of the 1,111 prisoners brought from the Solovki "special" prison in the White Sea was first established in the summer of 1996.

Their deaths were followed over the next 13 months by those of a further 3,500 inhabitants of Karelia and 4,500 workers from the White Sea Canal, leading to a total of 9,500 killings, with the bodies buried in 236 communal pits. The executions were part of the Great Purge that ran from 1936 to 1938.

== Later career ==
On 20 December 1937, Captain Mikhail Matveyev was given a commemorative gift, a radiogram and a set of gramophone records, for his "selfless work in the struggle against counter-revolution", i.e. his work at Sandarmokh between 27 October and 10 November that year.

On 11 March 1939 he was himself arrested on the orders of the new head of the NKVD Lavrenty Beria and sentenced to 10 years in a corrective labour camp. (On hearing this news, his fellow executioner Alexander Polikarpov shot himself.) Matveyev was not deprived of his awards and medals, however, and soon his sentence was reduced to three years, which he served in a camp in the Vologda Region.

Released early when Germany invaded the Soviet Union in 1941, during the Leningrad Blockade Matveyev was made komendant (chief executioner) of the NKVD internal prison in the city. He later received the highest Soviet award, the Order of Lenin, for his work in those years. He retired in December 1949.

== Life after Stalin, 1953-1971 ==
Some of those involved in selecting, escorting and then shooting the Solovki transport were questioned and investigated after Stalin's death as part of the process of rehabilitating their victims.

Like Matveyev, Major Pyotr Raevsky (1892-1967) was also arrested in 1939. He was accused of being "one of the leaders of a counter-revolutionary, insurgent organisation among the convicts on Solovki" and was sentenced in 1941 to 8 years in the camps. There he was employed as head of the solitary confinement unit in the punishment block. Released in 1947, Raevsky was rehabilitated in 1957 and re-admitted to the Communist Party. In the early 1960s, he was subjected to internal Party discipline for his active part in the Solovki executions.

No such investigation troubled Matveyev's later years and he died, a State pensioner, in 1971.

== See also ==
- Sandarmokh
- Yury A. Dmitriev
- Memorial (society)
