= Ukrainian list of Sandarmokh =

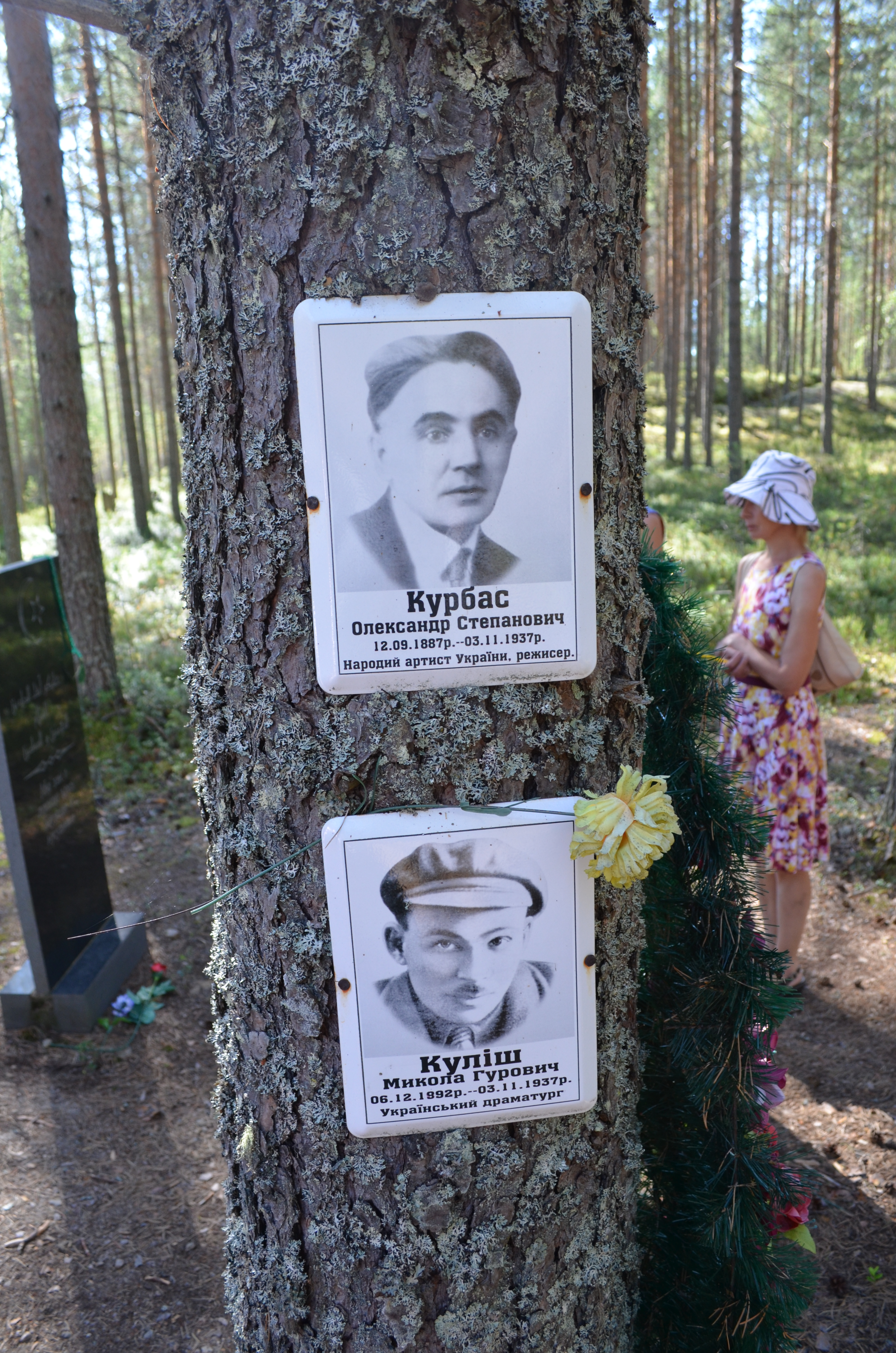
Memorial tables of theater director Les Kurbas and playwright Mykola Kulish, shot the same November 3, 1937 nearby Sandarmokh

Ukrainian list of Sandarmokh was build in 2010s by publicist Serhiy Shevchenko, collecting the names of people with origin from Ukrainian Soviet Republic who were shot at Sandarmokh, mostly during several days in between October 27 - November 4, 1937. From the list of 1116 politically repressed people there are more than 260 connected to Ukraine.

Some of them were Ukrainian political prisoners; others were persons whose fates were connected with Ukraine.

Most notable persons are:

- Les Kurbas 1887–1937 Renowned theater director, actor, founder of the "Berezil" Theater, prominent figure of the Executed Renaissance
- Mykola Zerov 1890–1937 Poet, literary critic, translator, professor of Ukrainian literature at Kyiv University, leader of the Neoclassicists
- Valerian Pidmohylny 1901–1937 Novelist, short story writer, translator, prominent modernist author (The City)
- Mykola Kulish 1892–1937 Playwright (Sonata Pathétique, Myna Mazailo), public figure, key figure in 1920s Ukrainian drama
- Valerian Polishchuk 1897–1937 Poet, writer, literary critic, founder of the "Avangard" literary group
- Pavlo Fylypovych 1891–1937 Poet, literary scholar, translator, professor, member of the Neoclassicist literary group
- Hryhorii Epik 1901–1937 Writer, journalist, screenwriter, member of the literary organization "VAPLITE"
- Myroslav Irchan 1897–1937 Poet, playwright, journalist, prose writer, editor of "Zakhidna Ukraina"
- Klym Polishchuk 1891–1937 Journalist, writer, poet, author of historical fiction and short stories
- Oleksa Slisarenko 1891–1937 Poet, prose writer, pioneer of Ukrainian detective fiction
- Volodymyr Chekhivsky 1876–1937 Prime Minister of the Ukrainian People's Republic (UNR), theologian, founder of the Ukrainian Autocephalous Orthodox Church
- Antin Krushelnytskyi 1878–1937 Writer, educator, publisher, Minister of Education of the UNR
- Ivan Krushelnytsky 1905–1937 Poet, artist, graphic designer (son of Antin Krushelnytsky)
- Bohdan Krushelnytsky 1906–1937 Economist, educator (son of Antin Krushelnytsky)
- Taras Krushelnytsky 1908–1937 Musician, writer (son of Antin Krushelnytsky)
- Volodymyr Yaroshenko 1888–1937 Poet, playwright, fable writer, literary critic
- Mykhailo Yalovy 1895–1937 Futurist poet, prose writer, playwright, first president of the literary association "VAPLITE"
- Stepan Rudnytsky 1877–1937 Geographer, cartographer, academician, founder of modern Ukrainian geography
- Matviy Yavorsky 1885–1937 Historian, political figure, academician, specialist in Marxist history of Ukraine
- Serhiy Hrushevsky 1892–1937 Historian, professor, educational figure (nephew of Mykhailo Hrushevsky)
- Vasyl Volkovynsky 1892–1937 Historian, educator, archivist
- Marko Voronyi 1904–1937 Poet, translator, children's writer (son of Mykola Voronyi)
