= Mikhail Matveyev =

Mikhail Matveyev may refer to:

- Mikhail Nikolaevich Matveyev (born 1968), Russian historian and communist politician
- Mikhail Rodionovich Matveyev (1892–1971), Soviet executioner
