= Piadyky =

Village in Ivano-Frankivsk Oblast, Ukraine

Piadyky П'ядики
- village
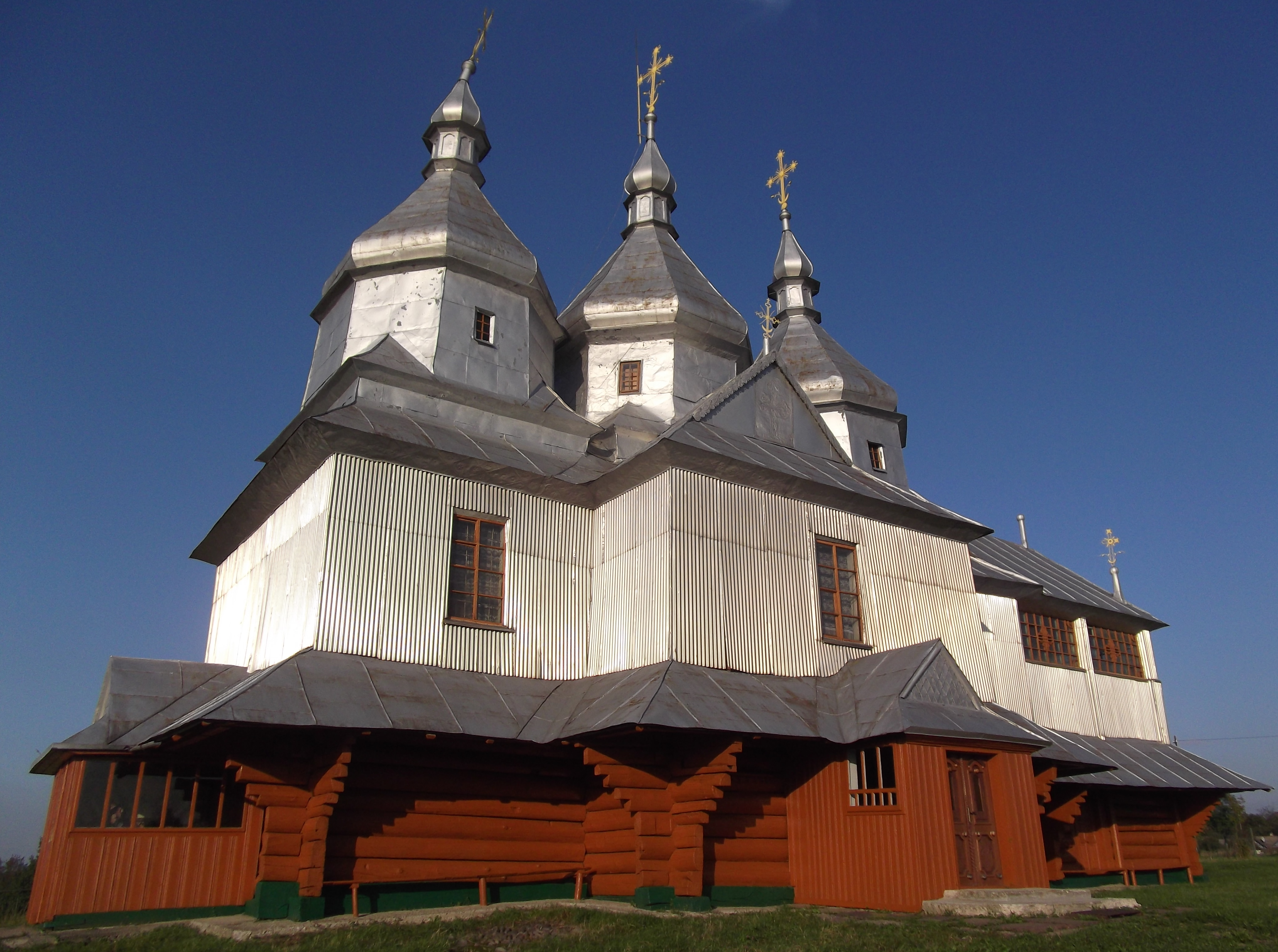
- Intercession Church in Piadyky

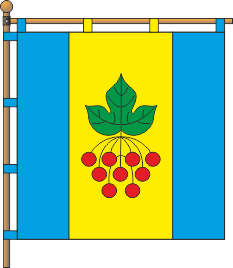
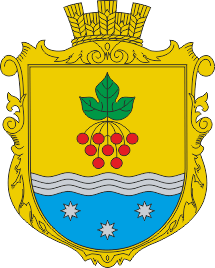
- Flag Coat of arms

- Location of Piadyky in Ivano-Frankivsk Oblast Location of Piadyky in Ukraine
- Coordinates: 48°33′54″N 25°10′48″E
- Country: Ukraine
- Oblast: Ivano-Frankivsk Oblast
- Raion: Kolomyia Raion
- First mentioned: 1480

Population
  - Total: 3,567

Piadyky (Ukrainian: П'ядики; Polish: Piadyki) is a village in Kolomyia Raion, Ivano-Frankivsk Oblast, Ukraine. It is the administrative centre of Piadyky rural hromada. Its population is 3,567 (as of 2023).

== History ==
A burial mound in Piadyky dates back to the Bronze Age. It was first mentioned in writing in 1480, as a village under property of a landlord. The village's residents participated in the Khmelnytsky uprising, leading to a complaint by a local landlord to Władysław IV Vasa, King of Poland, over the damages. Piadyky became part of the Austrian Empire after the partitions of Poland, and a local branch of Prosvita operated in the village starting in the late 19th century.

In the Second Polish Republic, the village was located in the Kołomyja County of the Stanisławów Voivodeship.

In 1939, according to Volodymyr Kubijovyč, Piadyky had a population of 2,460. Of this population, 2,030 were Ukrainians, 290 Latynnyky, 80 Polish people, (including 60 Osadniks), 30 Jews, and 30 Germans. The wooden church in the village, the Church of the Intercession, was first mentioned in 1680, and rebuilt most recently in 1840. The church is currently unused, with the Ukrainian Orthodox Church – Kyiv Patriarchate constructing a brick church in 2008. During the September campaign, the Polish 13th Observation Escadrille was stationed here.

In 1944, Ukrainian nationalists from the OUN-UPA brutally murdered 19 Poles as a part of Volhynia genocide.

== Notable residents ==
- Jakiw Palij, Ukrainian Schutzstaffel guard at Trawniki concentration camp
- Myroslav Irchan, Ukrainian dramatist
- Bohdan Hermaniuk (1931–2008), a founder of United Party for the Liberation of Ukraine, Soviet dissident and a victim of Soviet (1959–1968) camps.
