= Piadyky rural hromada =

Hromada in Ivano-Frankivsk Oblast, Ukraine

Piadyky rural hromada П'ядицька сільська громада
- Hromada
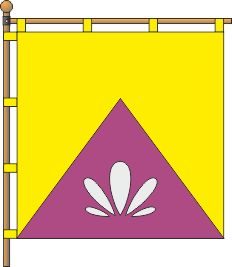
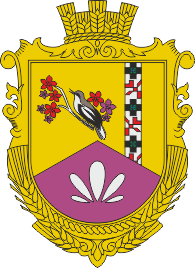
- Flag Coat of arms
- Interactive map of Piadyky rural hromada
- Country: Ukraine
- Oblast: Ivano-Frankivsk Oblast
- Raion: Kolomyia Raion
- Admin. center: Piadyky

Area
  - Total: 112.93 km^{2} (43.60 sq mi)

Population (2018)
  - Total: 9,658
  - Density: 85.52/km^{2} (221.5/sq mi)
- CATOTTG code: UA26080210000049380
- Settlements: 9
- Rural settlements: 1
- Villages: 8
- Website: pyadycka-gromada.gov.ua

Piadyky rural hromada (Ukrainian: П'ядицька сільська громада) is a hromada in Ukraine, in Kolomyia Raion of Ivano-Frankivsk Oblast. The administrative center is the village of Piadyky.

== Settlements ==
The hromada consists of 9 villages:

- Velyka Kamianka
- Hody-Dobrovidka
- Mala Kamianka
- Piadyky
- Studliv
- Turka
- Fatovets
- Tseniava
- Yasinky
