= Jakiw Palij =

Ukrainian war criminal

- Яків Палій
- Palij's visa photo, 1949
- Born: August 16, 1923; Piadyky, Second Polish Republic (now Ukraine)
- Died: January 10, 2019 (aged 95); Ahlen, Germany
- Occupation: Draftsman
- Spouse: Maria
- Military career
- Branch: Nazi Germany; Schutzstaffel

Jakiw Palij (Note: Ukrainian: Яків Палій, romanized: Yakiv Palii) (Yah-keev PAH’-lee; known also as Jakob Palij; August 16, 1923 – January 10, 2019) was a Polish-Ukrainian member of the Hiwi auxiliary guards at the Nazi Trawniki concentration camp during World War II. He eventually became an American citizen and lived most of his life in the United States until he was stripped of his citizenship and deported to Germany at the age of 95.

== Early life ==
Jakiw Palij was born on 16 August 1923 in the village of Piadyki, in what was then Stanisławów Voivodeship, eastern Poland and is now the Ivano-Frankivsk Oblast of western Ukraine. When World War II broke out in 1939, Soviet troops occupied his home village, along with other Polish territory, under the terms of the Molotov–Ribbentrop Pact. In the June 1941 Operation Barbarossa, Germans captured the village.

== Wartime service ==
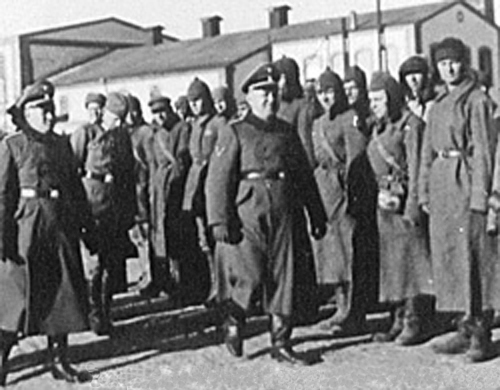
Inspection of Hiwis by SS-Hauptsturmführer Karl Streibel (center) at the Trawniki concentration camp, c. 1943

Germans built labor camps in occupied Poland. The SS ran one in Trawniki. The camp initially served as an Auffanglager für Flüchtlinge, a holding center for refugees, and then turned into the SS-Ausbildungslager-Trawniki training facility where Ukrainian volunteers were trained by the SS and then enrolled as auxiliaries, colloquially known as Hiwis.

Trawniki became an Operation Reinhard extermination camp. Trawniki Hiwis served in the Sonderkommando guard units and operated the gas chamber. Almost all Trawniki guards were involved in shooting, beating, and terrorizing Jews. Russian historian Sergei Kudryashov studied the Trawniki men at death camps and said that there was little sign among them of attraction to National Socialism ideals and that most had volunteered in order to get out of POW camps and/or because of self-interest. On the other hand, Holocaust historian Christopher R. Browning wrote that Hiwis "were screened on the basis of their anti-Communist beliefs and hence almost invariably were anti-Semites."

According to evidence later presented at his deportation hearings, Palij served in the Streibel Battalion, guarding forced laborers who made uniforms and brushes. On 3 November 1943, an estimated 6,000 Jews at the camp were executed in a single day, which Browning called "the largest killing operation against Jews in the entire war."

== Emigration to the United States ==
After Germany's defeat in 1945, Palij stayed in Poland. On 30 April 1948, another Piadyki-born Ukrainian camp guard, listed in Soviet military records as Nikolaj Gutsulyak or Mykola Hutsulyak, revealed to the Soviet authorities that he had served with Palij at the Trawniki extermination camp. In early 1949, and without yet having been traced by the Soviets, Palij, without disclosing his wartime service as an SS auxiliary, submitted a request to the US Displaced Persons Commission asking to be designated a "displaced person" eligible to emigrate to the United States. He gave the American authorities a false timeline of his life during the war, claiming he had worked on his father's farm in Piadyki, and subsequently at a farm and in a factory in Germany.

Palij got the travel visa and traveled to Boston Harbor in July 1949 from Bremerhaven, Germany aboard the Gen. Heintzelman, a US military-transport ship.

== Deportation to Germany ==
In 1993, investigators from the U.S Justice Department's Human Rights and Special Prosecution Section said they found the name of Jakiw Palij in an old Nazi roster. A fellow former guard testified that Palij was "living somewhere in America." Investigators found him in Queens New York, working as a draftsman and living in a "second-story apartment in a modest red-brick duplex" with his wife Maria, who had since died, an apartment that was "unwittingly" sold to him by a Holocaust survivor. In 2001, Palij admitted that he had lied in his original request for emigration to the States. In 2003 his American citizenship was revoked, and in 2004, a federal judge issued an order of deportation. In his decisions, issued on 10 June and 23 August 2004, U.S. Immigration Judge Robert Owens ordered Palij's deportation to "Ukraine, Poland or Germany, or any other country that would admit him," on the basis of his "participation in Nazi-sponsored acts of persecution while serving during World War II as an armed guard at the Trawniki forced-labor camp in Nazi-occupied Poland under the direction of the government of Germany and his subsequent concealment of that service when he immigrated to the United States." Judge Owens wrote also that the Jews massacred at Trawniki "had spent at least half a year in camps guarded by Trawniki-trained men, including Jakiw Palij." In December 2005, the Board of Immigration Appeals denied Palij's appeal. Palij repeatedly denied any wrongdoing, claiming that he and other young men from his home village were "coerced" into working for the "Nazi occupiers."

According to subsequent State Department statements, "difficult conversations" ensued between the United States and the three European countries to which he could be sent, Germany, Poland, or Ukraine, since none of them would concede to accept Palij.

In 2015, the public prosecutor's office in Würzburg Germany undertook a preliminary investigation on Palij, and a formal one in July 2016, but subsequently announced that the evidence against the suspect was "insufficient to accuse him of complicity in murder." During the time his deportation was pending, Palij continued to live in his Jackson Heights apartment in New York City, in front of which protests and demonstrations against his presence there were taking place regularly. Palij stated to the media that he had "become used to the protests", and did not expect any country to accept "an 80-year-old man in poor health."

In 2018, the German government approved Palij's entry into the country, "although the former guard of a Nazi labor camp was never a German citizen" and although "there [had been] no evidence that he was involved in Nazi crimes." Foreign Minister Heiko Maas said to the media:

We face the moral obligation of Germany in whose name the worst injustice was done under the Nazis. The task that grows for us from our history includes coming to terms with and honestly dealing with the crimes of the Nazi reign of terror. This also includes the compass of our Basic Law with the unconditional priority of human dignity and responsibility for the rule of law. On the basis of this belief, we take responsibility towards the victims of National Socialism as well as our international partners - even if this sometimes demands difficult political considerations.

On 21 August 2018, ICE agents raided the Palij residence in Queens, apprehended the 95-year-old deportee, and put him on a US government-chartered air ambulance from Teterboro Airport, New Jersey, which took its passengers to Dusseldorf, Germany. The German government announced that Palij would reside in a retirement home in the town of Ahlen.

Immediately following his deportation, US authorities subsequently declared that Palij had been the last known Nazi suspect living in the United States. However, in February 2021, Friedrich Karl Berger, a former guard at the Neuengamme concentration camp, was deported to Germany, where he died three months later in May 2021. Berger remains the last known Nazi suspect who was living in the United States.

== Death ==
On 10 January 2019, it was announced that Palij, a resident of the Ahlen care facility since his arrival in Germany, had died that morning "from natural causes", at the age of 95.

== See also ==
- John Demjanjuk
- List of denaturalized former citizens of the United States
