= Krasny Bor Forest, Karelia =

Forest and memorial cemetery in Republic of Karelia, Russia

Coordinates: 61°38′59″N 34°34′26″E

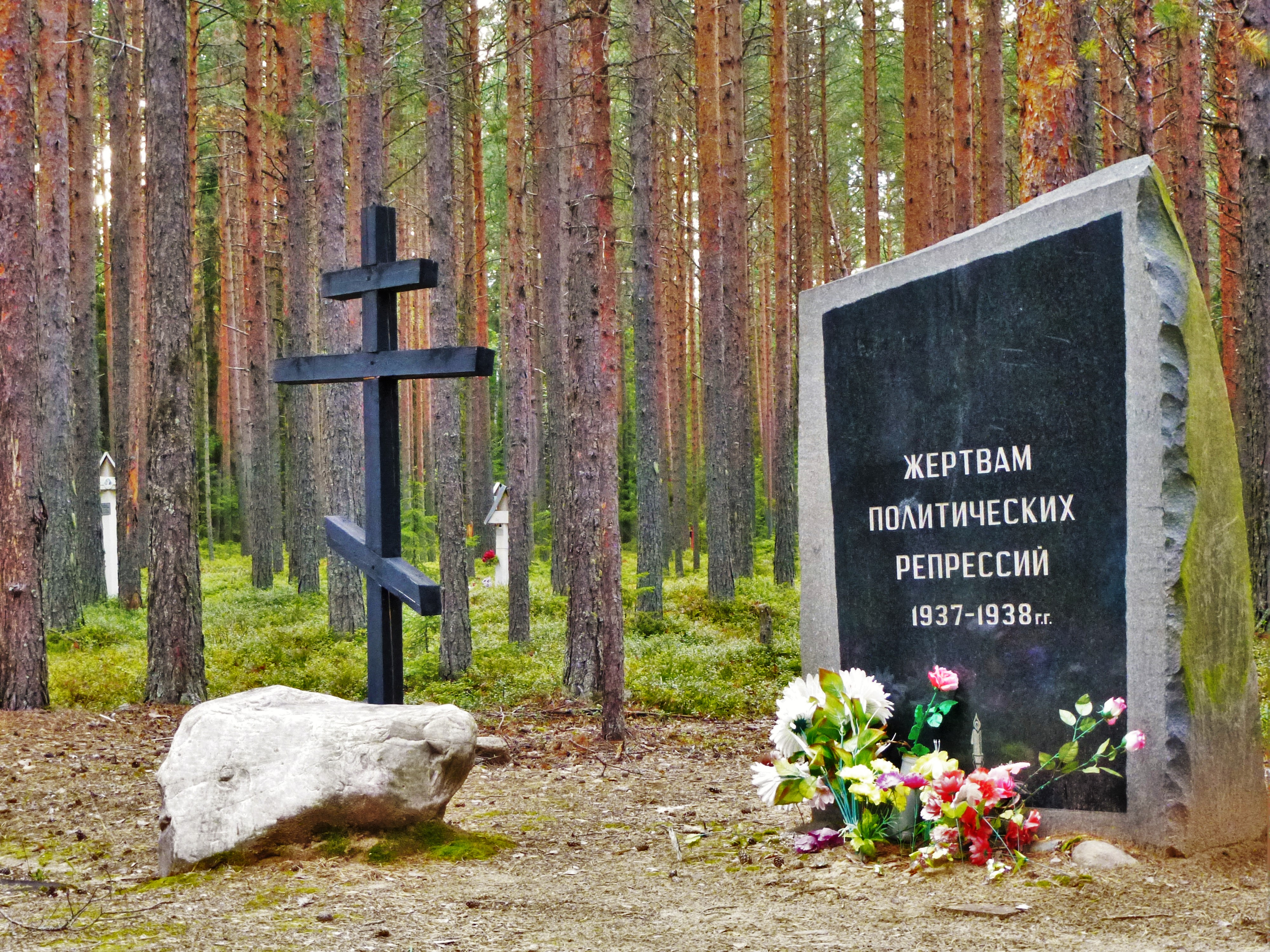
A memorial in Krasny Bor.

Krasny Bor (Russian: Красный бор, lit. 'Red Pine-forest') is a wooded area, not far from Petrozavodsk, the capital of Karelia, in northwestern Russia.

The Karelian instance of this common Russian toponym has become widely known, thanks to the efforts of Yury A. Dmitriev, as The Forest, Red with Spilled Blood, one of Stalin's killing fields of the late 1930s.

== Identifying the buried victims ==
In 1997 a killing field and burial place for NKVD executions during Stalin's Great Purges was identified at Krasny Bor and then thoroughly investigated by the historian Yury A. Dmitriev, the head of the human rights organisation Memorial in Karelia.

The burial site covers an area of approximately 350 by 150 metres. According to execution reports in the former KGB archives for Karelia, 1,193 people were shot and buried there: 580 Finns, 432 Karelians, 136 Russians and 45 persons of other nationalities. The shootings took place from 9 August to 15 September 1937 and from 26 September to 2 October 1938. The Finnish victims were targeted by the Finnish Operation of the NKVD.

In an interview with Yury Dmitriev recorded in May 2015 he said that through work in the archives the identity of all those shot at Krasny Bor had been established with a high level of certainty. For comparison, roughly half of those shot at Sandarmokh have been identified.

== A place of remembrance ==
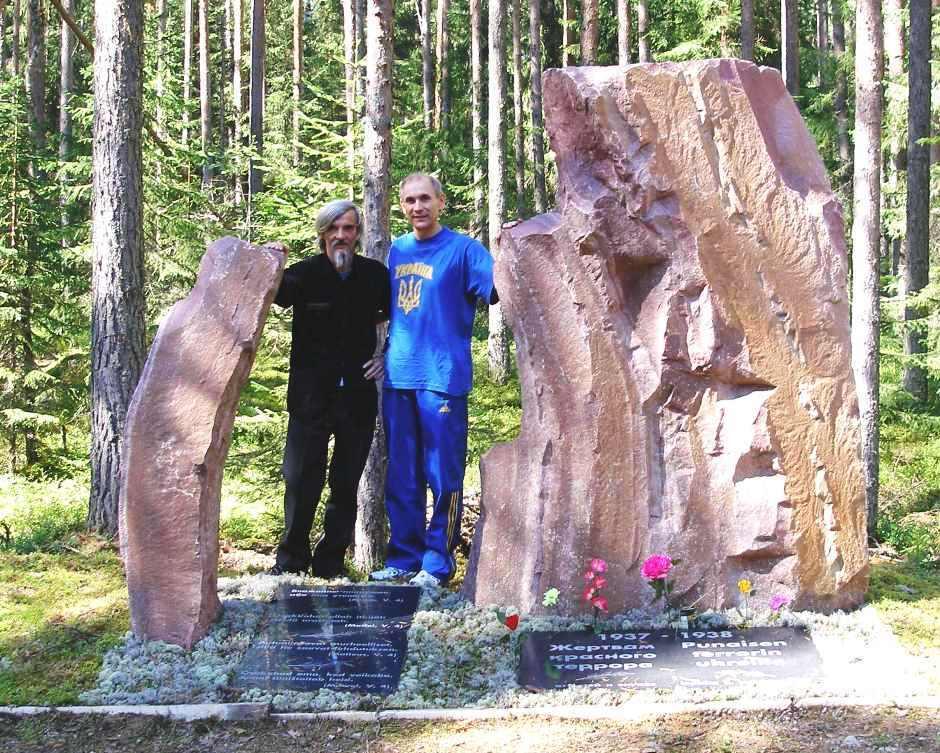
Yury A. Dmitriev at the memorial for the execution location in 2007.

On 31 October 1998, the memorial cemetery Krasny Bor was opened, a companion site to the large and growing complex at Sandarmokh. A Day of Remembrance is marked each year at Krasny Bor on 30 October, the traditional Political Prisoner's Day in the USSR.

On 12 October 2017 three Moscow writers – Ludmila Ulitskaya, Olga Drobot and Marina Vishnevetskaya – visited Krasny Bor after joining other supporters of Yury Dmitriev that morning in the corridor of the Petrozavodsk courthouse where his trial continued in closed session.

In the absence of Yury Dmitriev, then held at Detention Centre No 1, the annual Day of Remembrance took a different form in 2017: an official part, with dancing and singing, and an "unofficial" protest during which Dmitriev's daughter Katerina and others read aloud the names of the hundreds of victims from the lists compiled by her father.

== Publications ==
- Yury A. Dmitriev (2000) – The Forest, Red with Spilled Blood (Bor, krasnoj ot prolitoj krovi), 214 pp. Petrozavodsk.
- Yury A. Dmitriev (2002), (with Ivan Chukhin), The Karelian Lists of Remembrance: Murdered Karelia, part 2, The Great Terror (in Russian), 1,088 pp. Petrozavodsk. Also available online «Поминальные списки Карелии, 1937–1938: Уничтоженная Карелия, часть 2. Большой террор». The Lists contain over 14,000 names.

== See also ==
- Butovo firing range
- Kommunarka
- Mass graves in the Soviet Union
- Sandarmokh
