= Bohdan Hermaniuk =

Soviet dissident (1931–2008)

- Богдан Васильович Германюк
- Born: Bohdan Vasyliovych Hermaniuk; 20 August 1931; Piadyky, Stanisławów Voivodeship, Poland
- Died: 14 November 2008 (aged 77); Piadyky, Ivano-Frankivsk region, Ukraine
- Citizenship: Poland; Soviet Union; Ukraine
- Education: Lviv Polytechnic
- Occupation: Construction technician
- Years active: 1948–1959
- Known for: Founder of the United Party for the Liberation of Ukraine, dissident

Bohdan Vasyliovych Hermaniuk (Ukrainian: Богдан Васильович Германюк; 20 August 1931 – 14 November 2008) was a founder of United Party for the Liberation of Ukraine, Soviet dissident and a victim of Soviet (1959–1968) camps.

== Biography ==
Bohdan Hermaniuk was born on August 20, 1931 in the village of Piadyky in the family of farmers Vasyl Hermanyuk and Hafia Paliy.

First, he finished 7 grades of the Piadyky secondary school, later he entered the Chernivtsi Industrial Technical School. After graduating, he asked for a transfer to Ivano-Frankivsk to look after his younger brother and mother, who had become mentally ill due to poverty. He studied in absentia at the Lviv Polytechnic Institute.

Already in the early 1940s, he had connections with the regional referent of the OUN "Bystryi". In 1948, he shared the idea of creating an organization that would fight for the independence of Ukraine with his cousin Bohdan Rubych, who came on leave from the Soviet Army, joined the underground organization of the UPA and did not return to service. Rubych advised him to adhere to strict secrecy, to introduce pseudonyms, and then he received a pseudo "Khmil'".

In 1948, together with fellow villagers Myroslav Ploshchak, physical education teacher, Ukrainian language and literature teacher Vasyl Ploshchak, R. Kostyuk, and Mariyka Zamulinska, he created the United Party for the Liberation of Ukraine for the joint struggle for independence.

On December 4, 1958, he was arrested and interrogated in Stanislaviv. Not knowing the fate of other members of the organization and fearing that he would not be able to withstand the torture, he intended to commit suicide so as not to betray his comrades. But in the prison bathhouse, he was arranged to have a seemingly random meeting with Yarema Tkachuk, who told him about the arrests. Then Bohdan Germaniuk decided to take upon himself the authorship of the charter, the programs that were confiscated from him, and the text of the oath.

Before the investigation was completed, he was interrogated by 12 KGB officers.

On March 10, 1959, at a closed session of the Ivano-Frankivsk Regional Court, he was sentenced to 10 years in a maximum-security camp. He served his sentence in the Ozerlag penal camp in the Irkutsk region, where he met Myroslav Symchych, Zynoviy Karas, Petro Duzhy, and Volodymyr Gorbov. He was later transferred to the Taishet camps. The regime was tightened, rations were reduced, commercial canteens were abolished, and correspondence was restricted. Despite this, amateur artistic activities were carried out in the camps, and church and national holidays were celebrated. He ended his imprisonment in the ZhKh-385/17 camp in Mordovia, where he sewed work gloves. There were Hryts and Omelyan Pryshlyak, Yevhen Polyovy, Mykhailo Soroka, Colonel Levkovych, and Danylo Shumuk.

Two years before the end of the term, they were brought to Ivano-Frankivsk for talks with Ihor Kichak. They offered meetings and transfers, but they refused them because cooperation with the KGB was required in exchange.

He was released at the end of 1968, returned to Piadyky, where he had to care for his sick mother, and was under KGB surveillance there. He worked in Pechenizhyn at a brick factory, in Kolomyia at a household goods factory as a construction foreman, and traveled to the Mykolaiv region on construction contracts.

In 1989, he headed the Kolomyia branch of Ukrainian Helsinki Union, later the URP, was a member of the All-Ukrainian Society of Political Prisoners and Repressed Persons and the initiator and organizer of the creation of the Kolomyia city-district branch of the OUN-UPA Brotherhood of the Carpathian Region, which he headed.

He was rehabilitated on November 22, 1991.

Bohdan Hermaniuk died on November 14, 2008 in Piadyky.

== Awards ==
Honorary Citizen of Kolomyia (July 26, 2022, posthumously)
