= Hody-Dobrovidka =

Rural locality in Ivano-Frankivsk Oblast, Ukraine

Hody-Dobrovidka Годи-Добровідка
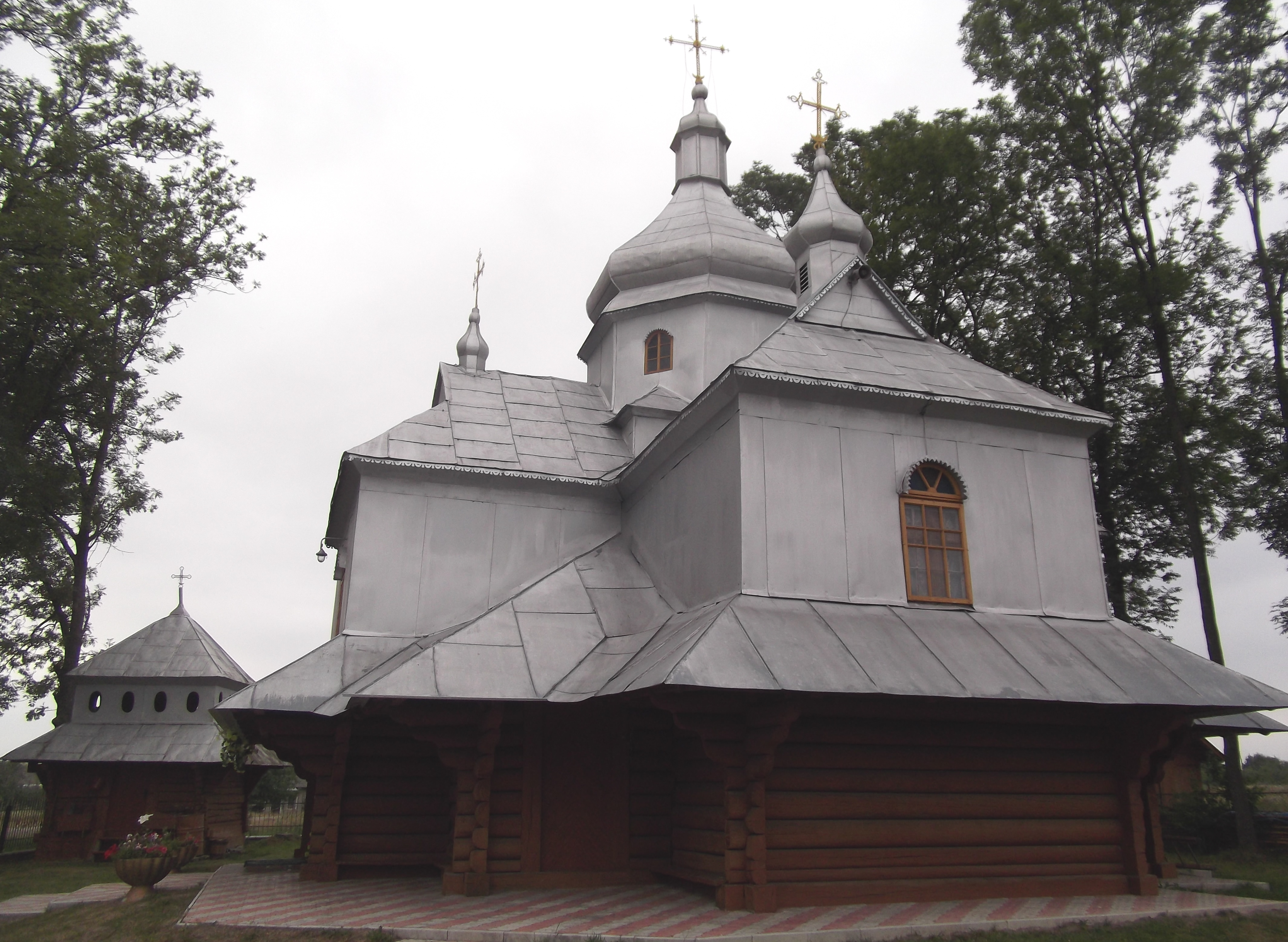
- The wooden church of St. George 1926

- Ukraine Ivano-Frankivsk Oblast Hody-Dobrovidka (Ivano-Frankivsk Oblast)
- Coordinates: 48°36′08″N 25°04′20″E
- Country: Ukraine
- Oblast: Ivano-Frankivsk Oblast
- District: Kolomyia Raion

Area
  - Total: 1,288 km^{2} (497 sq mi)
- Elevation: 335 m (1,099 ft)

Population
  - Total: 967
  - Density: 0.751/km^{2} (1.94/sq mi)
- Time zone: UTC+2 (EET)
  - Summer (DST): UTC+3 (EEST)
- Postal code: 78244
- Area code: +380 3433
- Website: село Годи-Добровідка / райцентр Коломия / облцентр Івано-Франківськ ^{(Ukrainian)}

Hody-Dobrovidka (Ukrainian: Го́ди-Доброві́дка, Polish: Gody-Dobrowódka) is a village in Kolomyia Raion of Ivano-Frankivsk Oblast in Western Ukraine. The population of the village is around 967 inhabitants, and local government is administered by Hodo-Dobrovidska village council. It belongs to Piadyky rural hromada, one of the hromadas of Ukraine.

== Geography ==
The village is in a flat terrain on the altitude of 335 metres (1,100 ft) above sea level and area of the village totals is 12.88 km^{2} (4.97 sq mi). It is at a distance 9 kilometres (5.6 mi) from the district center Kolomyia and 65 kilometres (40 mi) from the regional center of Ivano-Frankivsk.

== History and Attractions ==
The village was established in 1939 from the two separate villages, Hody and Dobrovidka. The first written record about Dobrovidka dates back to 1451, and Gody village mentioned in 1857. The village has an architectural monument of local importance of Ivano-Frankivsk region. It is the Church of St. Dmitry 1923 (Wooden). The church belongs to the architectural monuments of local importance. There is also the Church of St. George 1926 (Wooden).

The 19th-century Gody-Turka railway station is located here, situated on the Lviv-Chernivtsi line.

During the Second Polish Republic, the village was part of Kołomyja County of the Stanisławów Voivodeship. Between 1943 and 1945, Ukrainian nationalists from the OUN-UPA brutally murdered 15 Poles here as a part of Volhynia genocide. After the war, the village was detached from Poland and incorporated into the Ukrainian Soviet Socialist Republic.

== Famous people ==
- Helena Hajdejczuk, a Polish resident of the village, during the German occupation of Poland, provided assistance to Jews, for which she was murdered by the Germans. In 2002, Yad Vashem posthumously honored her with the title of Righteous Among the Nations.
- Petro Dmytrovych Melnychuk (1913-2004) – Candidate of Pharmaceutical Sciences, Associate Professor, Deputy Director for Science of Lviv State Medical Institute (1944-1961), known phytotherapeutist. He graduated from the Lviv University (1939), was twice sentenced to death, once by the Bolsheviks (1941) and once by the German occupiers (1944).
