= Valerian Polishchuk =

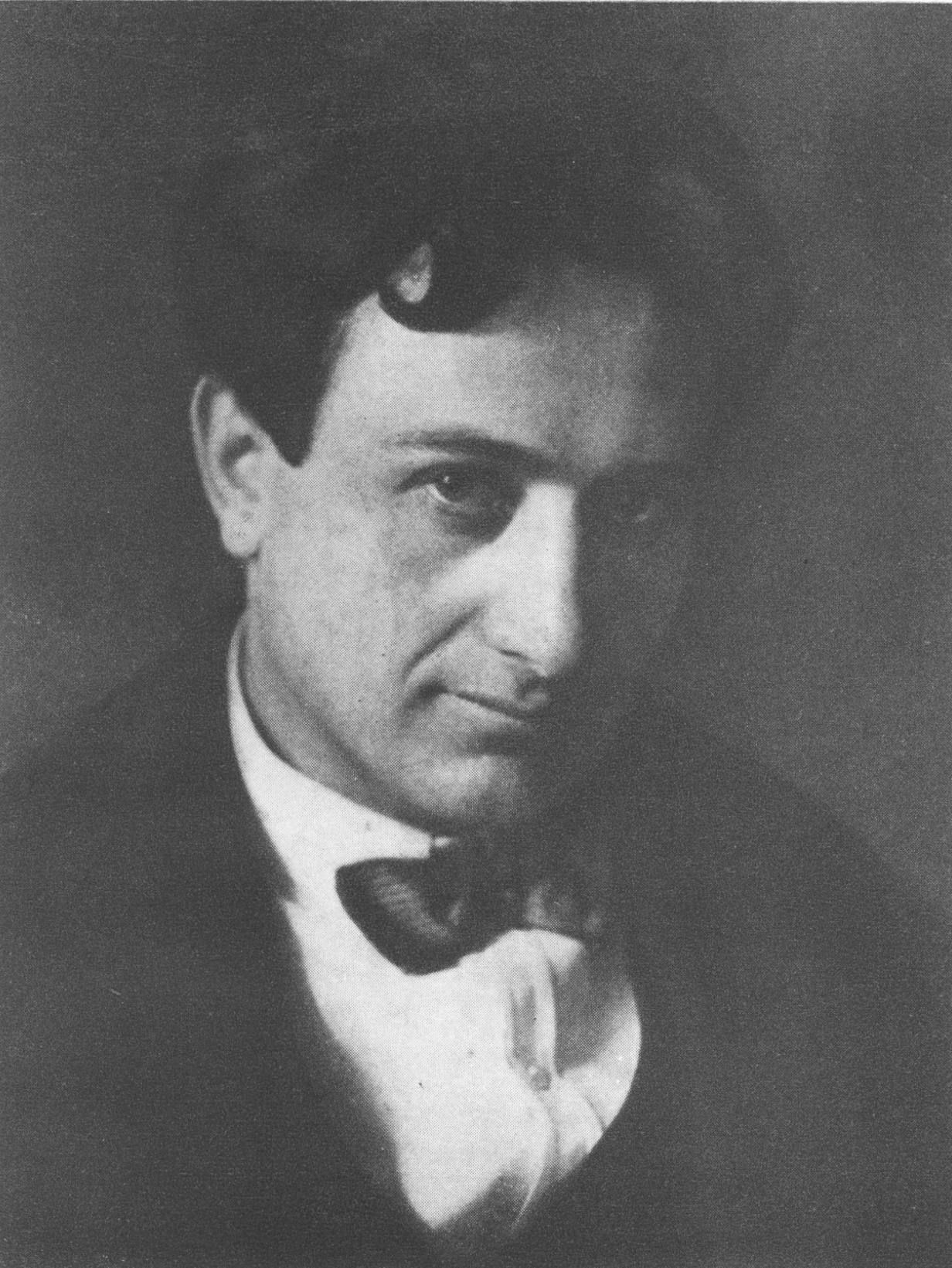
Polishchuk in 1928

Valerian Lvovych Polishchuk (Ukrainian: Валеріан Львович Поліщук, 1 October 1897 — 9 October 1937) was a Ukrainian writer and poet, a representative of the Executed Renaissance. He wrote in Ukrainian.

Polishchuk was born in the village of Bilche, currently in Rivne Oblast of Ukraine. He studied in Lutsk and later in Yekaterinoslav, graduating from high school in 1917. Since 1917, he was living in Kiev and Yekaterinoslav, writing for various newspapers. During the Russian Civil War, Polishchuk supported the Ukrainian People's Republic.

Polishchuk has been writing poetry since 1914. In 1919 he published his first poem The Old Tale on How Olga Burned Korosten (Сказання давнєє про те, як Ольга Коростень спалила). In 1920, he already published three books of poetry. In 1921, Polishchuk moved to Kharkiv, where he was actively involved with various literature activities. In 1923, he joined HART, which also featured, among others, Pavlo Tychyna, Volodymyr Sosiura, and Mykola Khvylovy. In 1925, Polishchuk co-founded the modernist literature group Avanhard, which existed until 1930. he published over 40 books, mainly poems.

In the 1930s, Polishchuk was heavily criticized by literary critics associated with the authorities. He was accused in nationalistic nature of his poetry. In November 1934 he was arrested, accused in counterrevolutionary activity, and on 27 or 28 March 1935 he was sentenced for 10 years in jail without having a trial. He was sent to Solovki prison camp and eventually executed in Sandarmokh with other figures of Ukrainian culture. In 1962, he was posthumously rehabilitated.

The poetry of Polishchuk is described as experimental, under a strong influence of futurism.

Polishchuk married Olena-Rakhil Konikhes, the couple had two children. After Polishchuk was jailed, his family saved his manuscripts.
