= Sandarmokh =

Cemetery forest massif in Karelia, Russia

Coordinates: 62°51′49″N 34°43′12″E

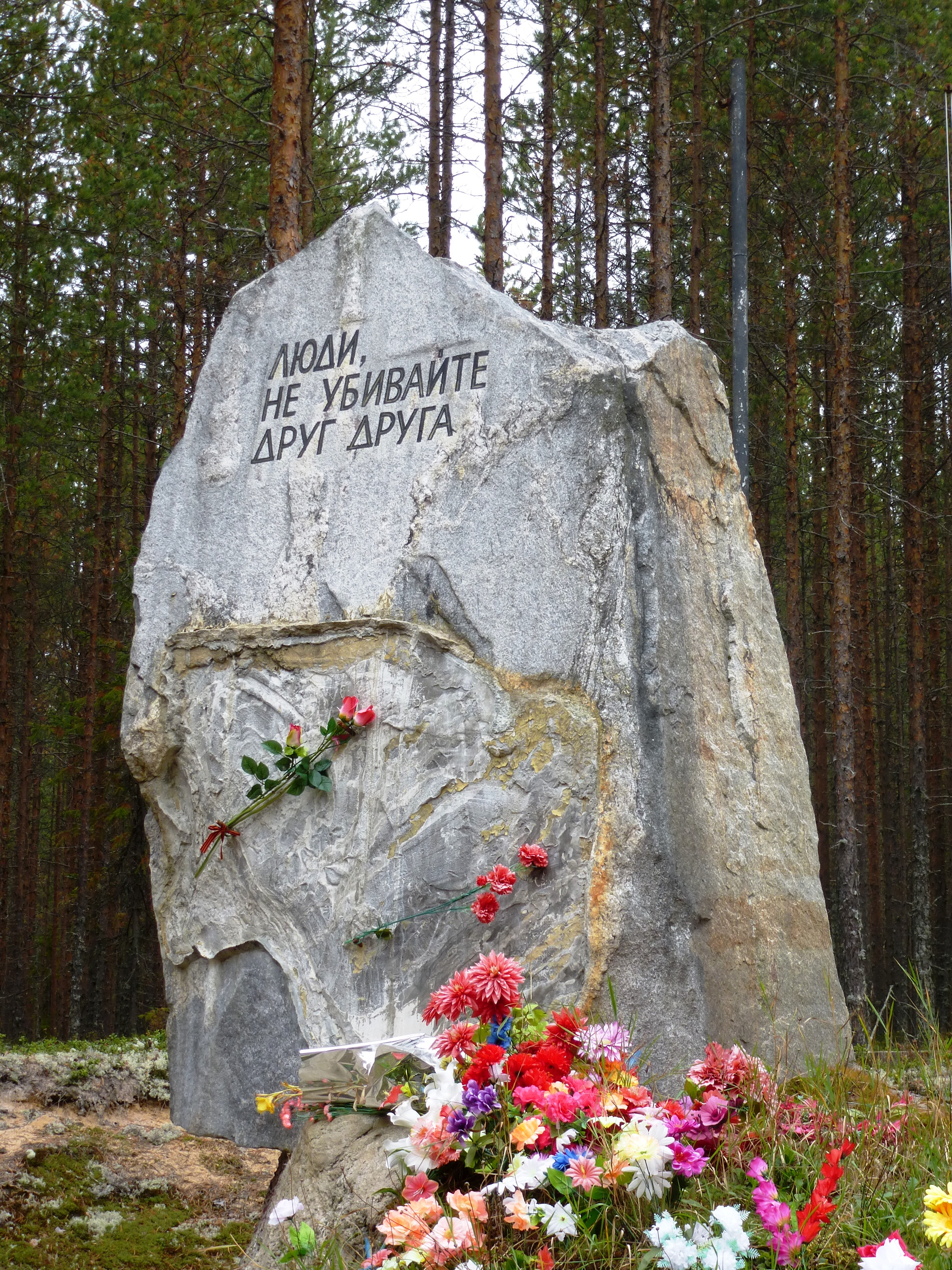
The monumental slab at the entrance to the Sandarmokh burial grounds reads: "People! do not kill one another".

Sandarmokh (Сандармох; Karelian: Sandarmoh) is a forest massif 12 km (7.5 mi) from Medvezhyegorsk in the Republic of Karelia where victims of Stalin's Great Terror were executed. Their number is unknown, but is estimated to be in the thousands. More than 58 nationalities were shot and buried there by the NKVD in 236 communal pits over a 14-month period in 1937 and 1938.

At least 1,000 victims were from the Solovki special prison on an island in the White Sea. It was long thought that the barges carrying them were deliberately sunk on the way to the mainland, drowning all the prisoners on board. Others were rounded up during the Great Terror in Karelia, in accordance with quotas for prisoners, 'enemies of the regime', and a variety of "national operations". According to available documentation at least 6,000 were shot and buried at Sandarmokh.

Today Sandarmokh is a memorial to the crimes of Stalin and his regime and since 1998 has been the focus of an international Day of Remembrance on 5 August every year.

== Discovery and remembrance ==
On 27 October 1937, 1,116 prisoners were loaded onto three barges and taken from Solovki to the mainland for their sentences at Sandarmokh.

Only in 1996, thanks to the efforts of Veniamin Ioffe (1938–2002), co-chairman of the Memorial research centre in St Petersburg, documents were found in the archives of the Arkhangelsk department of the Federal Security Service (FSB) throwing light on the subsequent fate of the "first Solovki transport". These included the lists of those men and women who were to be shot. One died before he could be executed; four more were sent to other parts of the Gulag.

After years of work on the ground in Karelia by Yuri Dmitriev, this documentary evidence pointed the way to the identification on 1 July 1997 of the Solovki prisoners' last resting place and that of another 5,000 executed individuals. By the suggestion of Ioffe, the location would subsequently be given the local (Karelian) name "Sandarmokh" (sometimes spelled "Sandormokh"), by the name of an abandoned khutor (small settlement) shown in old maps of the area. The story of that search and discovery was told in 2017 by Irina Flige, head of the Memorial Education and Information Centre in St Petersburg. In 2015 Dmitriev recounted how he, Flige and the late Veniamin Ioffe had found the burial site. According to documents found in the FSB archives in Arkhangelsk, there were people of 58 nationalities among those shot at Sandarmokh.

Three hundred personal plaques and memorials have been erected around the site since 1997 to commemorate the many victims of this killing field, both individually and as representatives of particular nations and cultures, and an international Day of Remembrance has been held there every 5 August since 1998. In 2010, Patriarch Kirill of the Russian Orthodox Church led the mass for the slain victims of Stalin at Sandarmokh, just as he and his predecessor Alexy II have done, every year since 2007, at the Butovo killing field near Moscow.

Today, thanks to the Memorial Society, to Veniamin Ioffe and Yury Dmitriev, over 5,000 of the dead of Sandarmokh can again be named and remembered individually, at the place where they lie buried.

Ukraine declared 2012 as "Sandarmokh List Year" in reference to several hundred Ukrainian language writers and poets from the Executed Renaissance who were arrested, shot, and buried at Sandarmokh after the Great Turn, when new Soviet General Secretary Joseph Stalin decided, as a preliminary to the Holodomor – the devastating man-made famine in Ukraine – to reverse the Post-1917 policies of Korenizatsiya and Ukrainianization. These otherwise Pro-Soviet writers refused to submit to Stalin's return to the House of Romanov's policy of the coercive Russification of Ukraine and were shot, according to the Ukrainian Government, because they inspired the people of Ukraine with their own national culture, filling them "with pride and strength".

== Those shot at Sandarmokh, 1937–1938 ==
The thousands executed over 14 months from October 1937 to December 1938 fall into three broad groups. Many were from Karelia, a total of 2,344 free inhabitants of the republic. A smaller number (624) were forced "settlers" (i.e. peasants exiled to the North after the collectivisation of agriculture). A great many of those shot (1,988) were already prisoners of the Belbaltlag (White Sea–Baltic Canal) camp system. A smaller group of 1,111 prisoners were brought there from Solovki prison camp. Together they made up almost half of those shot during the Great Terror in Karelia.

"Alongside hard-working peasants, fishermen and hunters from nearby villages", wrote Yury Dmitriev, "there were writers and poets, scientists and scholars, military leaders, doctors, teachers, engineers, clergy of all confessions and statesmen who found their final resting place here." Among the last named group were prominent members of the intelligentsia from the many national and ethnic cultures of the USSR – for example, Finns, Karelians, and Volga Germans. Ukraine was especially singled out, losing 289 of its writers, dramatists and other public figures, the "Executed Renaissance", in a single day.

The following 25 individuals illustrate this variety. They are listed by surname in alphabetical order:

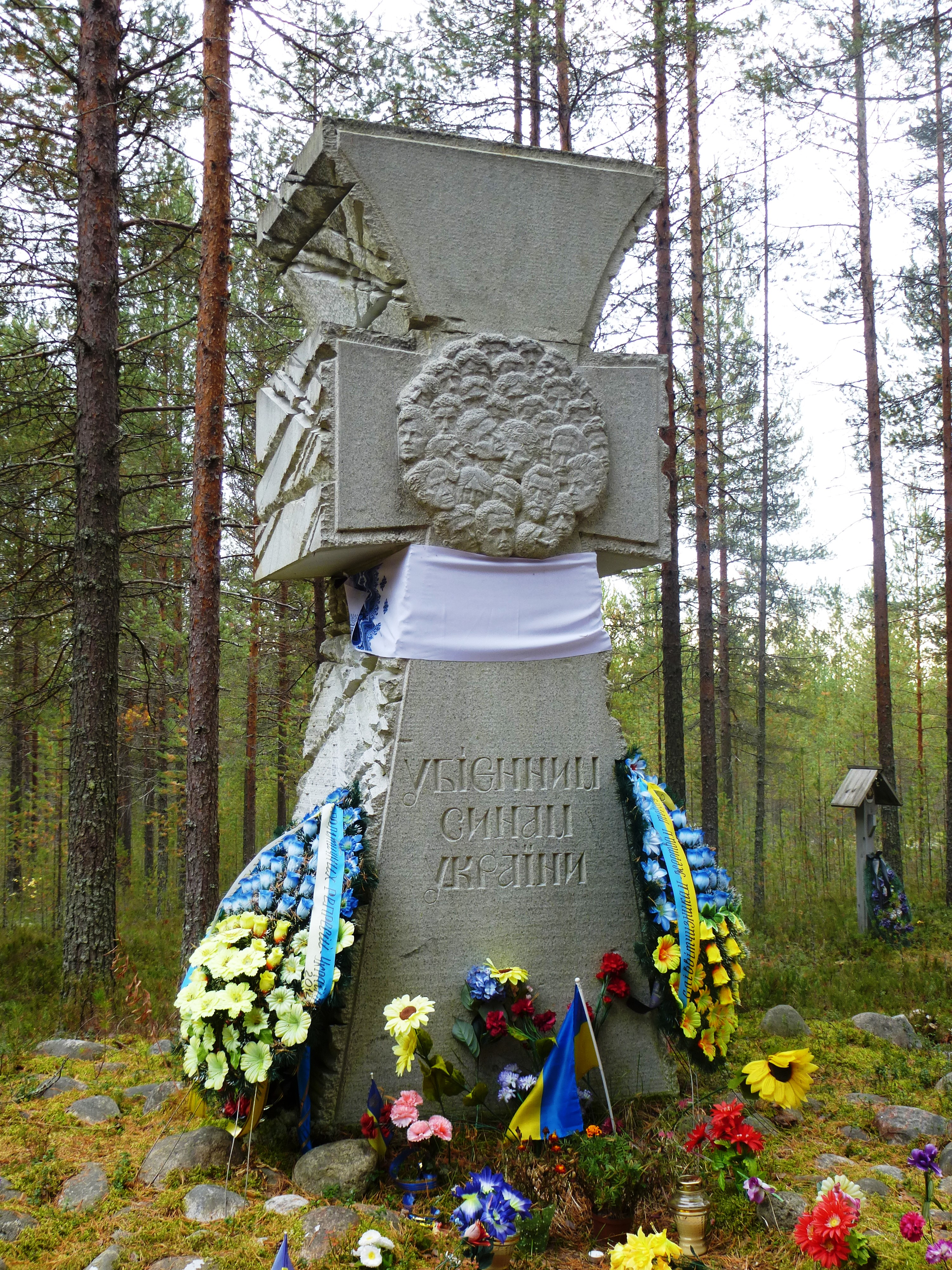
Memorial to Ukrainians shot at Sandarmokh

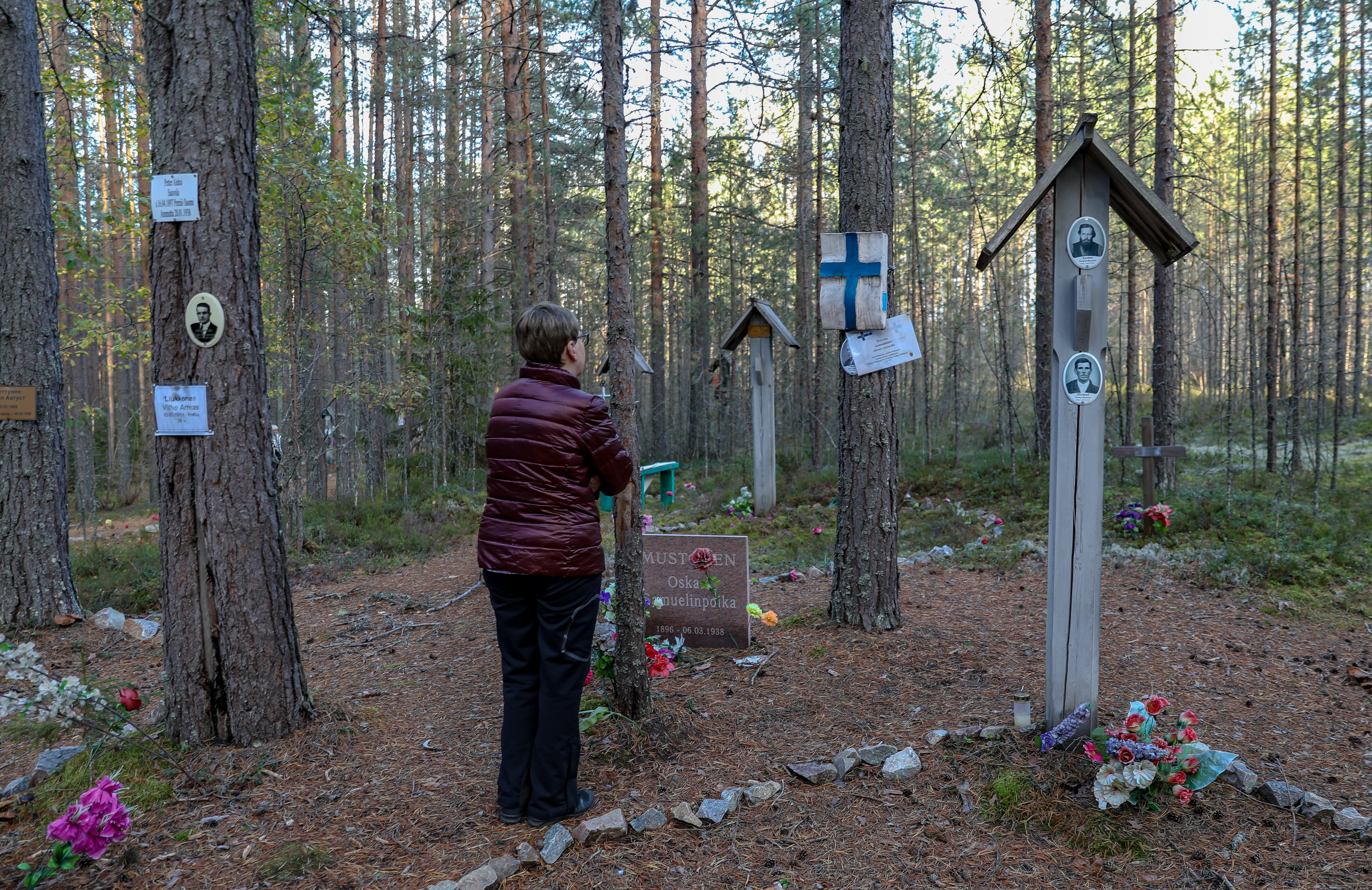
Finnish victims' memorial at Sandarmokh

- Prince Yasse Andronikov, Imperial Russian Army officer, actor and theatre director: shot 27 October 1937, aged 44
- Nikolai Durnovo, Russian linguist, shot 27 October 1937, aged 60
- Camilla Krushelnitskaya, organiser of an underground Catholic group in Moscow: shot 27 October 1937, aged 45
- Shio Batmanishvili, a Georgian Hieromonk, the Superior of the Servites of the Immaculate Conception, and both the Apostolic Administrator and Exarch of the Georgian Greek Catholic Church, shot 1 November 1937
- Kuzebay Gerd, Udmurt writer and public figure: shot 1 November 1937, aged 39
- Hryhorii Epik, Ukrainian writer: shot 3 November 1937, aged 36
- Myroslav Irchan, Ukrainian writer, journalist, and playwright: shot 3 November 1937, aged 40
- Mykola Kulish, Ukrainian writer, educator, journalist, and playwright: shot 3 November 1937, aged 40
- Les Kurbas, Ukrainian theater director: shot 3 November 1937, aged 50
- Valerian Pidmohylny, a Ukrainian writer: shot 3 November 1937, aged 37
- Mykhailo Poloz, a Ukrainian politician, diplomat, statesman, and participant of the Treaty of Brest-Litovsk: shot 3 November 1937, aged 45
- Ivan Siyak, Ukrainian military leader: shot 3 November 1937, aged 50
- Archbishop Damian (Voskresensky) of Kursk and Oboyan, Russian Orthodox Church: shot 3 November 1937, aged 64
- Father Peter Weigel, Volga German Roman Catholic priest: shot 3 November 1937, aged 45
- Mykhailo Yalovy, Ukrainian writer, publicist, playwright: shot 3 November 1937, aged 42
- Mykola Zerov, Ukrainian poet: shot 3 November 1937, aged 47
- Yevgenia Mustangova (Rabinovich), literary critic: shot 4 November 1937, aged 32
- Grigory Shklovsky, Soviet diplomat, ex-Bolshevik: shot 4 November 1937, aged 62
- Vasily Helmersen, Russian librarian and artist: shot 9 December 1937, aged 64
- Kalle Vento, Finnish journalist: shot 28 December 1937, aged 41
- Nikolay Hrisanfov, a Karelian writer: shot 8 January 1938, aged 39
- Anton Yablotsky, Polish "special settler" from Ukraine: shot 21 January 1938, aged 37
- Kalle Toppinen, Finn, carpenter, Karelia: shot 5 March 1938, aged 45
- Alexei Kostin, member of collective farm, Karelia: shot 9 March 1938, aged 39
- Nikita Remnev, carpenter, Karelia: shot 3 April 1938, aged 37
- Fyodor Bagrov, head of collective farm, Karelia: shot 22 April 1938, aged 42

Members of the Finnish diaspora who emigrated to the USSR during the Great Depression and who were later arrested and shot at Sandarmokh as a part of the Finnish Operation of the NKVD, are listed by John Earl Haynes and Harvey Klehr in their study In Denial: Historians, Communism, and Espionage (2003). They included 141 Finnish Americans, and 127 Finnish Canadians.

== Victims and executioners ==
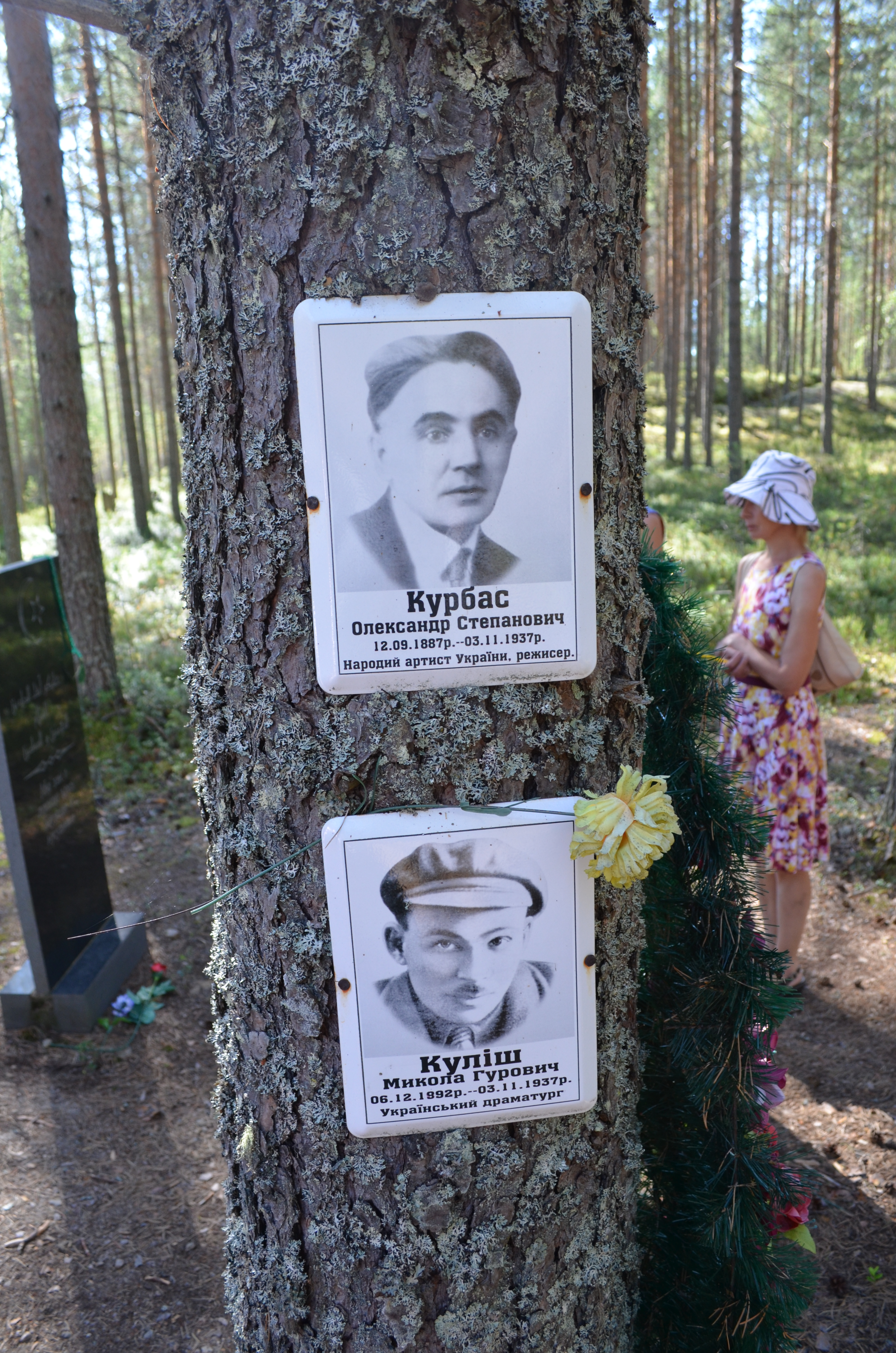
Commemorative photos fixed to trees around the pits at Sandarmokh.

It is often said or assumed of Soviet mass executions that they were carried out by firing squad. For the Soviet regime and, later, the Third Reich, this method of execution was the exception, not the rule.

From early days onwards, the preferred Soviet method of quick despatch was to dig a trench and then, the executioner standing immediately behind the upright or kneeling victim, shoot the victims at point blank range in the back of the head. This was the infamous "nine grammes of lead". The victims tumbled into the trench and were buried; sometimes another, control shot (контрольный выстрел, kontrolnyi vystrel) was fired into the victim's head to make sure he or she was dead, sometimes only one shot was used. (A rare, extended description by a former executioner of how such mass killings were organised can be found in Lev Razgon's 1988 memoirs.)

This was the method used at Sandarmokh, Krasny Bor and Svirlag in the late 1930s, as the skulls found at these sites amply testify. Cross-examined while under arrest in 1939, the chief executioner Mikhail Matveyev said he made the victims lie face down in the prepared trench and then shot them.

Thanks to the efforts of Ivan Chukhin, founder of Memorial in Karelia, a national deputy to the Supreme Soviet (and the Duma) and Yury Dmitriev's mentor, the names of the members of the troika which rubber-stamped decisions to shoot a list of individuals – the accused were not present at these sessions, no one defended their rights – and of the execution squad leaders became known by the mid-1990s.

The man sent from Leningrad on 16 October 1937 to organise the shooting of the Solovki transport, Matveyev, was an experienced NKVD executioner. He was succeeded at Sandarmokh by I.A. Bondarenko and his deputy A.F. Shondysh. Matveyev survived into old age; his successors were both arrested in 1938 and shot in 1939 for "exceeding their authorisation".

== New digs and alternative hypothesis ==
Starting in 2016, there were attempts to revise this account of the shootings at Sandarmokh, and claim that among the dead were Soviet POWs shot by the invading Finns in 1941–1944. There were newspaper articles and TV broadcasts in Russia; there was also a publication in the Finnish press.

The motivation behind this claim and the supposed new evidence were both challenged. In a lengthy and detailed investigation, Russian journalist Anna Yarovaya examined the evidence and interviewed historians and those who had found the site. She talked to Finnish historians of the Second World War; Irina Flige of the Memorial Society and Sergei Kashtanov, head of the district administration where the killing fields were found. She also interviewed Sergei Verigin, one of the Russian historians putting forward the new hypothesis. Russian newspapers and television had talked of "thousands" of POWs being shot by the Finns and buried at Sandarmokh: speaking on the record to Yarovaya, Verigin was more cautious and spoke of dozens and hundreds.

The Karelian edition of the State-run Rossiya TV channel announced briefly on 22 April 2018 that there would be new investigations at Sandarmokh "this summer".

Agence France-Presse covered later developments in September 2018, citing critics who state that the digs have a political motivation to manipulate public opinion and an attempt to cover up Stalinist crimes. The European External Action Service's EUvsDisinfo.eu website has classified the claims that Finns are responsible for the Sandarmokh killings as "pro-Kremlin disinformation".

The head of the local museum, Serge Koltyrin, was arrested in October 2018, shortly after he publicly criticized the new excavations. He was convicted in a closed trial of pedophilia and sentenced to 9 years in prison. In early March 2020, a local court decided to release him due to a terminal illness, however, the prosecutor challenged this decision and Koltyrin died in a prison hospital on 2 April 2020.

== Publications ==
- Yury A. Dmitriev (1999), Sandarmokh, the Place of Execution (in Russian), 350 pp. Bars Publishers: Petrozavodsk.
- Yury A. Dmitriev (2002), with Ivan Chukhin, The Karelian Lists of Remembrance: Murdered Karelia, part 2, The Great Terror (in Russian), 1,088 pp. Petrozavodsk. (Also available online «Поминальные списки Карелии, 1937–1938: Уничтоженная Карелия, часть 2. Большой террор».) The Lists contain over 14,000 names.

== See also ==
- Ukrainian list of Sandarmokh
- Kommunarka shooting ground
- Mass graves in the Soviet Union
- Memorial (society)
- Category:People shot and buried in Sandarmokh (Russian Wikipedia)
