= Nikolai Nikolayevich Durnovo =

Russian linguist

Nikolai Durnovo Николай Дурново
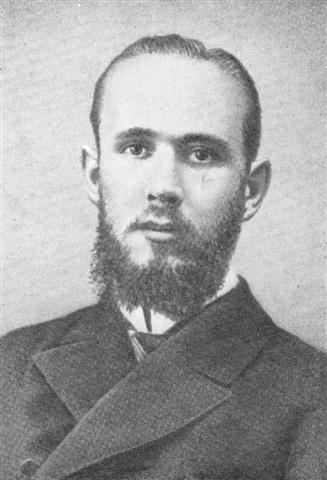
- Born: Nikolai Nikolaevich Durnovo; 23 October 1876; Moscow, Russian Empire
- Died: 27 October 1937 (aged 61); Sandarmokh, Karelian ASSR, Russian SFSR, Soviet Union
- Cause of death: Executed by shooting
- Education: Doctor of Science (1918); Corresponding Member of the Russian Academy of Sciences
- Alma mater: Imperial Moscow University (1899)
- Occupation: Linguist

Nikolai Nikolayevich Durnovo (Russian: Никола́й Никола́евич Дурново́; 4 November [O.S. 23 October] 1876 – 27 October 1937) was a Russian linguist. He was sentenced to death and shot during the Great Purge.

== Biography ==
Durnovo was born into the Durnovo family. His father was also named Nikolai Nikolayevich Durnovo, and his paternal grandmother was a member of the noble House of Saltykov.

Durnovo was a member of the USSR Academy of Sciences (1924) and the Belarusian Academy of Sciences and specialised in Russian language dialectology, the history of Russian and Slavic languages, Russian language morphology theory of grammar, as well as ancient literature. He created a classification of Russian dialects that served as a base for modern scientific linguistic nomenclature.

During the Great Purge, Durnovo was shot and buried in a mass grave at Sandarmokh in Karelia (northwest Russia).
