= Yury Dmitriev =

Russian historian and human rights activist

- Юрий Алексеевич Дмитриев
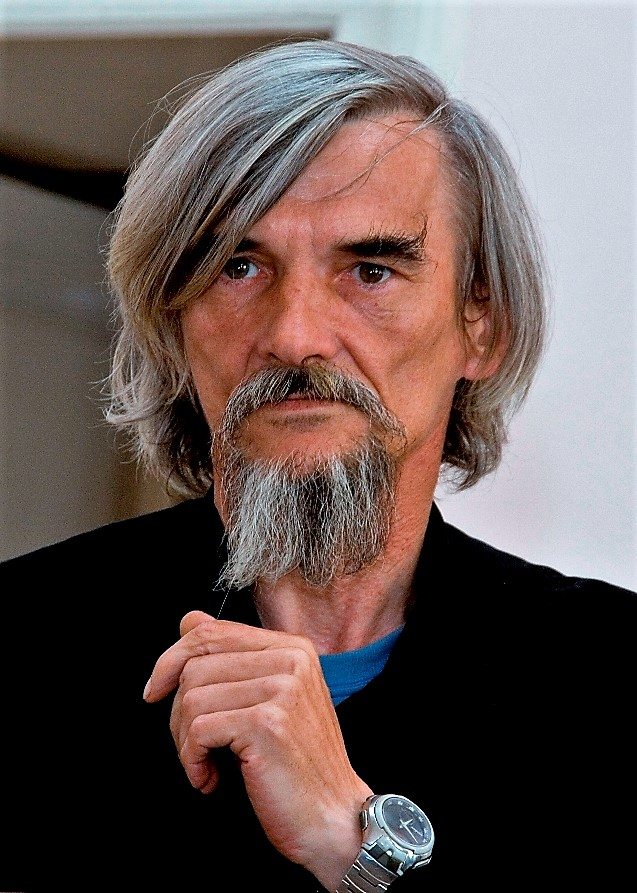
- Dmitriev in 2007
- Born: Yury Alexeyevich Dmitriev; 28 January 1956; Petrozavodsk, Karelo-Finnish SSR, Union of Soviet Socialist Republics
- Citizenship: Russia
- Education: Leningrad Medical College
- Occupations: Human rights activist, researcher into deportation, and author imprisonment and executions in 1930s
- Spouse: twice married
- Children: Son Yegor, daughter Katerina (Klodt); adopted daughter Natasha
- Writing career
- Notable awards: Golden Pen of Russia (2005) Gold Cross of Merit, Poland (2015) Honorary Diploma of the Karelian Republic (2016) While in custody Sakharov Prize for "Journalism as an Act of Conscience", Moscow (2017) "Moscow Helsinki Group" award (2018) "Sakharov Freedom award", Oslo (2021)

Yury Alexeyevich Dmitriev (Russian: Юрий Алексеевич Дмитриев; born 28 January 1956) is a local historian and activist in Karelia (Republic of Karelia). From the early 1990s onwards, he worked to locate the execution sites of Stalin's Great Terror in Karelia and, by studying the archives, tried to identify as many as possible of the buried victims they contain. Since the late 1980s Dmitriev worked continually to compile "Books of Remembrance" for Karelia, listing all the names of those executed there.

Dmitriev is a devout Russian Orthodox Christian.

On 13 December 2016 Dmitriev was arrested and charged with making pornographic images of his foster daughter, Natasha, who was 11 at the time. From the outset Dmitriev's colleagues declared the charges to be baseless and motivated by a determination to discredit the historian and his work. The closed trial attracted national and international attention and criticism. On 26 December 2017, a second assessment by a court-appointed body of the photographs of his foster daughter concluded that they contained no element of pornography and had been taken, as the accused insisted, to monitor the health of a sickly child.

On 5 April 2018, Dmitriev was acquitted of all but one minor offence.

Within two months he was arrested and soon put on trial again. Given a short sentence at the end of his second trial in July 2020, the verdict was overruled by the High Court of Karelia and the charges returned for an unprecedented third judicial examination. Dmitriev and his lawyer Victor Anufriev battled through the courts in Petrozavodsk, St Petersburg and Moscow to have their appeal against the verdict and sentence heard. In October 2021 the case finally reached the Supreme Court of the Russian Federation. But on December 27 his sentence was increased to 15 years.

Since May 2022, Dmitriev has been serving the rest of his sentence in strict-regime camp 18 in Mordovia.

== Childhood and early adult years ==
Yury Dmitriev was born in Petrozavodsk. He spent his first year in a Soviet orphanage. In 1957 he was adopted by a childless army officer and his wife; he found out he was not their child at the age of 14. His father was posted to East Germany, and Yury spent part of his childhood in Dresden.

He began but did not finish a course at the Northwest Health Department of the Leningrad Medical College. During the Gorbachev years, Dmitriev was a member of the Karelian People's Front, and served between 1988 and 1991 as an aide to USSR People's Deputy Mikhail Zenko. It was then that he first encountered mass graves of those shot in the 1930s.

== Restoring the names ==
Dmitriev is famous for his part in the discovery and investigation of two major burial sites in Karelia, Sandarmokh and Krasny Bor, and their subsequent transformation into "informal" memorial complexes.

Yekaterina Klodt, Dmitriev's daughter by his first marriage, has described her father's determination to do as much as he possibly could to identify the victims buried in the anonymous and secret graves of the Stalin era. "I often asked him why he continually sat at the computer, writing or copying something out," she told Gleb Yarovoi. Dmitriev answered: "I do not know who I was in a past life, but I understand the meaning of my life now and I know that I must do this." As she grew older Yekaterina would frequently tell him to take a break—how much longer would he go on with these lists? "I can't stop," Dmitriev replied, "I must finish the book, people are waiting for it." Dmitriev's life consisted, for year after year, of winters spent in the archives followed by summers scouring the forested areas around particular cities and towns with Witch (Vedma), his Alsatian, hunting for possible burial sites.

At first Dmitriev was junior partner to Ivan Chukhin (ru: Чухин, Иван Иванович), a deputy of the RSFSR Supreme Soviet and State Duma (1990-1995), and the first chairman of the Memorial Society in Karelia. Chukhin felt compelled to engage in the work because his own father had been involved in acts of repression under Stalin. When Chukhin, a retired police officer, was killed in a car accident in May 1997 Dmitriev carried on alone. On 1 July 1997, with members of St Petersburg Memorial, Dmitriev located a massive killing field, 12 kilometres from Medvezhyegorsk, that subsequently acquired the name of Sandarmokh; some weeks later, guided by local inhabitants, he confirmed the identification of the Krasny Bor execution site, 20 km from Petrozavodsk.

The thousands executed at Sandarmokh over 14 months from October 1937 to December 1938 fall into three broad groups. Many were from Karelia, a total of 2,344 free inhabitants of the republic. A smaller number (624) were forced "settlers" (i.e. peasants exiled to the North after the collectivisation of agriculture). A great many of those shot (1,988) were already prisoners of the Belbaltlag (White Sea Canal) forced labor camp system. A smaller group of 1,111 prisoners were brought there from the Solovki island prison. Together they made up almost half of those shot in Karelia during the Great Terror.

"Alongside hard-working peasants, fishermen and hunters from nearby villages," wrote Yury Dmitriev wrote:[15] "there were writers and poets, scientists and scholars, military leaders, doctors, teachers, engineers, clergy of all confessions and statesmen who found their final resting place here."

In 2003, in addition to his Books of Remembrance, Dmitriev also published a collection of documents about the construction of the White Sea-Baltic Canal and the fate of the numerous prisoners and "special settlers" engaged in its construction.

== Recognition at home and abroad ==
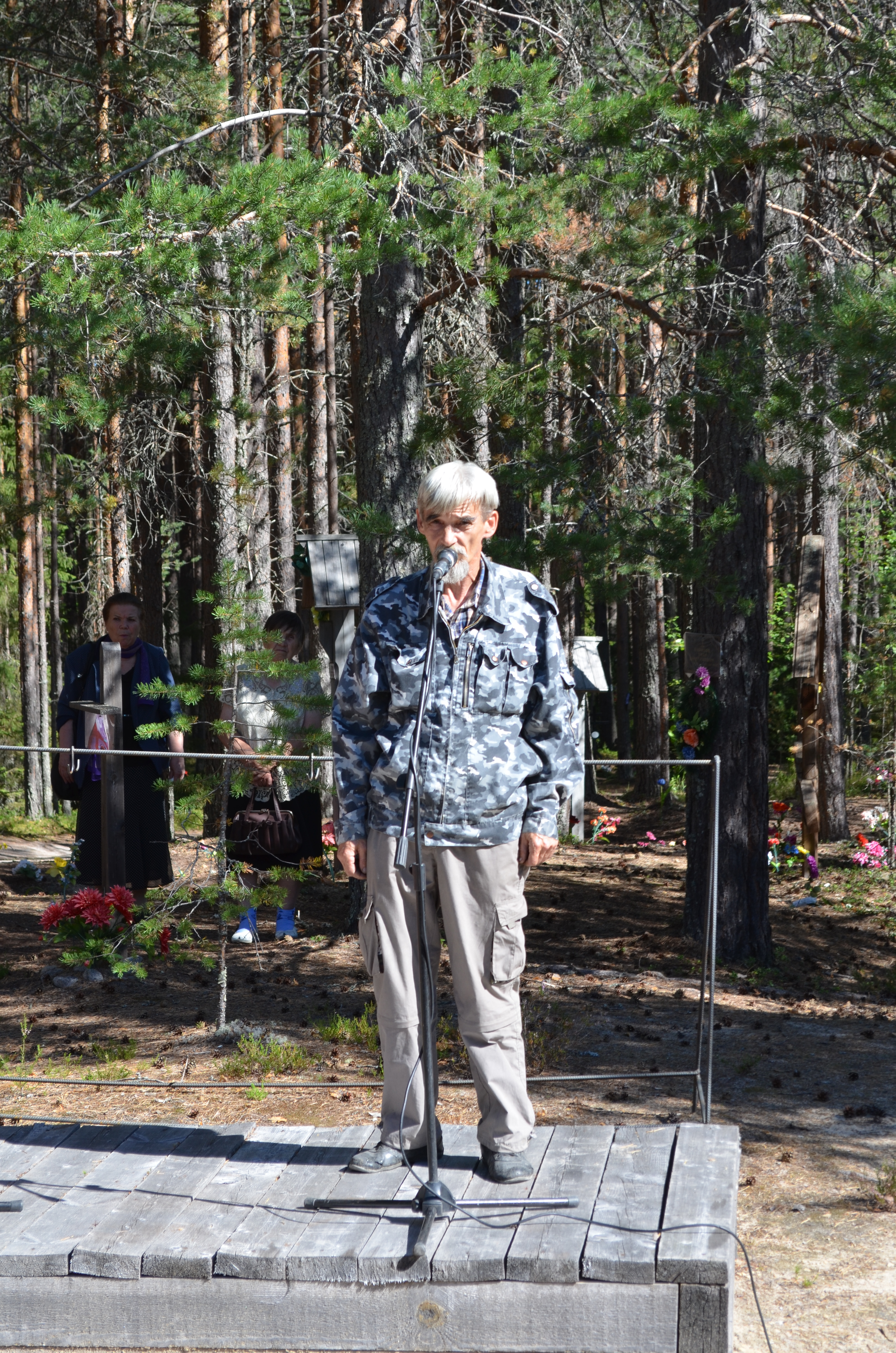
Yury A. Dmitriev, speaking at Sandarmokh, 5 August 2013

As a result of Dmitriev's activities, he was appointed secretary of the Petrozavodsk Commission for Restoring the Rights of Rehabilitated Victims of Political Repression and in 2002 became a member of the organisation of the same name at the republican level, covering all of Karelia. He was a member of the Karelian branch of the Memorial Society, and in 2014 became its chairman.

From 1998 to 2009, Dmitriev headed the Academy for the Defence of Socio-Legal Rights, a Karelian human rights NGO. As president of that body, in 2002, Yury Dmitriev wrote to the then head of the Karelian republic, Sergey Katanandov, objecting to the proposal by the Karelia Council of Veterans to put up a statue in Petrozavodsk to Yury Andropov. (KGB chairman from 1967 to 1982, Andropov headed the Komsomol in Karelia during the Great Patriotic War, from 1940 to 1944.) Katanandov did not reply to Dmitriev's letter and the 10-foot-high memorial to Andropov was erected. The decision, commented Dmitriev, reflected the nation's attitude to its recent history: "We don't know the past, and we don't want to know."

In 2005, Dmitriev was awarded the new "Golden Pen of Russia" prize for his publications.

In 2015, he received the Gold Cross of Merit from Poland for his work in locating mass burials at Sandarmokh and on Solovki, and identifying the victims they contained: ethnic Poles in the Soviet Union were one of the nationalities targeted during the Great Terror.

In November 2016, a month before his arrest, Dmitriev was awarded Karelia's highest prize, the Honorary Diploma of the Karelian Republic, by the head of Karelia Alexander Hudilainen (Худилайнен, Александр Петрович, 2012-2017).

On 31 December 2017, Yury Dmitriev was one of 16 journalists, bloggers, writers and historians, imprisoned or otherwise persecuted by the authorities, who were recognised at the annual Sakharov awards in Moscow for "Journalism as an Act of Conscience".

== Criminal prosecution ==
In late 2016, Dmitriev was arrested on charges of child pornography. In 2018, he was acquitted of those charges. Later in 2018, he was arrested again for charges of sexual assault. In 2020, he was found guilty of those charges and sentenced to 3 and a half years in prison. This sentence was later increased to 13 years.

His defense team considered the charges to be fabricated, a misinterpretation of what little evidence the investigators had found. There was also concern about the prospects for a fair trial. On 10 January 2017 a 13-minute segment of the news programme entitled "What does Memorial have to hide?" on a national TV network Rossiya-24 showed the allegedly pornographic photographs Dmitriev had taken of his foster daughter Natasha. The defence team believed they were leaked to the media by the investigators, although as evidence in a forthcoming trial they were sub judice.

The explanation offered by Dmitriev for the existence of the 140 photographs, 9 of which were claimed by the prosecution to be pornographic, is that they recorded the improving health of a neglected and under-nourished little girl from a children's home, whom he and his second wife had taken into their care. He stopped keeping this photographic record in 2015.

It was subsequently revealed by the defence that there were only three such photographs: copies of two photos boosted the total to nine.

When charges were brought against the imprisoned Dmitriev in early 2017 it became clear that he had many supporters. By early July, an Internet petition in his defense had drawn over 30,000 signatures in Russia and elsewhere.

== First trial (2017–2018) ==
After months in police custody, Dmitriev's trial began on 1 June 2017. As with other trials in Russia concerning sexual offences against minors, neither press nor public were admitted to the hearings at the Petrozavodsk City Court.

On 11 July, four expert witnesses testified on behalf of the defence, casting serious doubts on the interpretation of the evidence by the prosecution and its experts. Dmitriev's attorney Victor Anufriev announced that the hearings had ended for the time being and would resume on 1 August. He expressed the hope that his client could address the court on 22 August and that a verdict would be delivered by 1 September 2017.

Thanks to the persistence of the defence, however, the trial continued. On 15 September 2017, the court agreed to submit the photographic evidence to other experts, after the defence had petitioned four times for such a decision.

=== New assessment of photographs ===
The alternative organisations proposed for this task, first by the prosecution and then by the judge, proved to be obscure private firms without the legal right to act as forensic experts.

The hearing scheduled for 18 October was postponed because the new experts were not ready to present their fresh assessment of the same 9 pornographic photographs. A hearing was held on 25 October but the assessment of the photographs was still not ready. On 26 December 2017, the new court-appointed body finally presented the findings of its experts that there was no element of pornography in the photographs taken by Dmitriev and concluded that their purpose was to monitor the health of a sickly child.

=== Second psychiatric assessment ===
That same day the Petrozavodsk City Court ruled that Yury Dmitriev should undergo a second psychiatric assessment at the Serbsky Center in Moscow, and that a third assessment of the nine photographs be made by the same body. This decision caused some concern. Dmitriev had already been subject to psychiatric assessment in Petrozavodsk and there had been signs of a revival at the Serbsky Center of its well-documented Soviet-era use as an instrument of political punishment.

On 27 December 2017, the court changed the measure of restraint imposed on Dmitriev. After more than a year in custody at the city's Detention Centre No 1, he would be released on 28 January 2018 (his 62nd birthday), on condition that he did not leave the country. On 28 December, without notifying his defence attorney, the court had Dmitriev flown under escort to Moscow where he was taken to the Serbsky Center to begin assessment. On 30 December, Dmitriev's son delivered food for his father to the Serbsky Center.

=== Release and resumption of trial ===
On 27 January, Dmitriev was released from custody and allowed to return to his home, on condition that he did not leave the city of Petrozavodsk. On 20 March, the city prosecutor Askerova reaffirmed the accusations against him and demanded 9 years of prison in a severe regime colony. The next court hearing is scheduled for 22 March 2018.

=== Acquittal and appeal ===
On 5 April 2018, Dmitriev was acquitted of the child pornography charges by Judge Marina Nosova at the conclusion of his trial at the Petrozavodsk City Court. She found him guilty of possessing parts of a shotgun and sentenced him to three months probation plus community service. Dmitriev had denied all the charges.

Novaya Gazeta newspaper commented: "The decision was unprecedented for Russian justice where the percentage of acquittals does not exceed the statistical margin of error." In trials without a jury, the percentage of acquittals in the Russian judicial system is now markedly less than 1% of the total. The result in the Dmitriev Case, therefore, was an achievement against the odds. (In trials where the case is heard before a jury, the proportion of acquittals was higher, around 20% of the total in 2009.)

On 13 April 2018, the Petrozavodsk city prosecutor, Yelena Askerova, submitted a formal appeal to the court against the acquittal of Yury Dmitriev on all but one charge. This appeal was accepted by the Supreme Court of Karelia and a hearing was set for Thursday, 14 June. Dmitriev's defence attorney, Victor Anufriev, submitted an appeal against his client's conviction for possessing parts of a firearm. On 14 June 2018, the acquittal was overturned by the Supreme Court of Karelia.

=== Reaction to trial ===
Journalist Maria Eismont wrote that the trial of Yury Dmitriev in Petrozavodsk was "the most important thing happening in Russia right now".

The dramatist and poet Alexander Gelman commented:

"This trial has helped us recognise a remarkable man. It is a barbaric way of discovering good people, but in Russian society it has proved very effective. In this sense, the trial has done something worthwhile."

By early December 2017, over seventy video clips of famous Russians speaking in Dmitriev's defence—writers, musicians, priests, historians, film-makers, actors—had been posted on a variety of social media and reposted to his supporters' Facebook page and to the Dmitriev Affair website. Among them were TV presenter and literary critic Alexander Arkhangelsky, Natalya Solzhenitsyn, film director Andrey Zvyagintsev, and the sculptor-designer of the Wall of Sorrow monument, Georgy Frangulyan, who commented: "What has happened [to Dmitriev] is appalling, it's tragic".

== Second Trial (2018–2020) ==
=== New arrest, a new charge ===
On 28 June 2018, Yury Dmitriev was arrested again, apparently for breaking the terms of his release in April: he was stopped by police, travelling out of the city of Petrozavodsk to attend the funeral of a friend. The NTV national TV channel published footage of Dmitriev at the police station and claimed that he had been attempting to flee the country. To the former charge of child pornography was now added that of "sexual acts of a forcible nature" (Article 132, part 4).

On 20 September 2018, the Supreme Court of Karelia turned down an appeal from Dmitriev's lawyer Victor Anufriev to change the measure of restraint on his client from custody at Detention Centre No 1 to home arrest. The first hearing of the new trial was scheduled to take place on that day, but was postponed until 27 September because the accused and his lawyer had not yet finished re-reading the case materials for the old charges. On 27 September the hearing was again postponed for the same reason, until 17 October.

=== Verdict, sentence overruled ===
On 22 July 2020, Dmitriev was acquitted of producing pornography and the illegal possession of weapons, but found guilty of sexual assault against his adopted daughter. After the trial ended the basis for this charge was finally made public – Dmitiriev had touched his daughter's underwear to see whether it had been wetted with urine. Judge Merkov sentenced him to three years and six months of imprisonment, little more than a quarter of the sentence recommended in the Criminal Code for such an offence. The relatively mild sentence may have been partly due to the testimony of a linguist who participated in an analysis of the questioning of Natasha.

If the appeal against this sentence by the prosecution had not been upheld, Dmitriev would have been freed in mid-November 2020. Since his first arrest in December 2016, he had already served most of this term of imprisonment, under investigation or awaiting and during his two trials, in detention centre No 1 in Petrozavodsk. At the end of the trial in July 2020, the prosecution asked for him to serve a 15-year sentence in a strict regime penal colony.

The defence has appealed against the conviction, demanding that Yury Dmitriev be cleared of all charges; an appeal was also lodged on behalf of Natasha. The prosecution prevailed. At an appeals hearing in September 2020 the High Court of Karelia increased the sentence fourhold for offences under Article 132 to 13 years in a strict-regime penal colony and sent the other charges back for a further "unprecedented" examination at the Petrozavodsk City Court.

== Appeals (2020–2021) ==
=== Appeals to Petersburg, Moscow and Strasbourg ===
Victor Anufriev, Dmitriev's defence attorney since December 2016, pressed for the High Court's ruling to be considered by the Third Cassation Court of Appeal in St Petersburg. This was granted after a struggle. On 16 February 2021 the court in Petersburg left the sentence unchanged. Dmitriev then appealed to the Supreme Court in Moscow. Meanwhile lawyers at Memorial submitted an appeal on his behalf to the European Court of Human Rights in Strasbourg.

After delay and resistance, the Supreme Court agreed to accept Dmitriev's appeal detailing procedural violations and opposing the drastic increase in the sentence. In October 2021 Judge Sergei Abramov of the Supreme Court turned down the request to examine the appeal before the Court. Dmitriev lawyer Anufriev challenged this decision as an inadequate response to the 25 hefty case files of evidence, accumulated since June 2017, which had twice led to his client's effective acquittal.

=== The Third Trial and verdict ===
The Third Trial resumed behind closed doors without any statement by the RF Supreme Court. The case files had been returned, presumably, from Moscow to Petrozavodsk.

The prosecution and the defence gave their closing statements in mid-December and on 14 December it was announced that the verdict in the third trial would not be made public until 11 am on 27 December 2021, the day before the next hearing of the case against the Memorial (society) at the Supreme Court.

== In the camps ==
In May 2022, Dmitriev arrived in the Mordovian camps in the Volga Federal District (okrug), hundreds of miles away from his family in Karelia and his defence attorney Anufriev in St Petersburg, to serve the remaining half of his 15-year sentence. He was held in strict-regime camp Number 18. The remote Mordovian camps were used in Soviet times to hold political prisoners alongside violent offenders.

Subsequent reports raised concern about his increasingly poor health and the inclination of the camp authorities, even at the camp medical centre, to punish him rather than investigate his condition. In a recent letter Dmitriev mentioned with some scepticism that he was finally getting some treatment.

== See also ==
- Great Terror, 1937-1938
- Krasny Bor (execution & burial site)
- Mass graves in the Soviet Union
- Sandarmokh (execution & burial site)

== Publications ==
=== Author and editor ===
- 1999 - Sandarmokh, a Place of Execution (in Russian), 350 pp. Bars Publishers: Petrozavodsk.
- 2000 - The Forest, Red with Spilled Blood (Bor, krasnoj ot prolitoj krovi), 214 pp. Petrozavodsk.
- 2002 - (with Ivan Chukhin) The Karelian Lists of Remembrance: Murdered Karelia, part 2, The Great Terror (in Russian), 1,088 pp. Petrozavodsk. (Also available online as «Поминальные списки Карелии, 1937–1938: Уничтоженная Карелия, часть 2. Большой террор».) There are over 14,000 names in the Lists.
- 2003 - The White Sea-Baltic Canal, from plan to implementation: A collection of documents, 250 pp. (in Russian), Petrozavodsk.
- 2017 - launch in CD form of two unpublished books by Dmitriev in Petrozavodsk on 24 May.
- 2019 - Sandarmokh, a Place of Remembrance (in Russian), 520 pp.
- 2020 - "Last Words", Yury Dmitriev's address to the court, 8 July 2020.

=== Interviews ===
- 2008 - "We must never forget", Karelia weekly, No 122, 30 October (in Russian).
- 2009 - "Yury Alexeyevich Dmitriev", interviewed by Tomas Kizny: The commemorative museum of the NKVD investigative prison, Tomsk (Siberia), (in Russian).
- 2015 - "My path to Golgotha: An interview with Yury Dmitriev", Memorial website (Dmitriev Affair website).
- 2016 - "The dictatorship of fear and lies is returning", Petrozavodsk Speaking, 27 January (in Russian).
- 2018 - "A first interview after release", 7x7-Horizontal Russia, 28 January (Dmitriev Affair website).
- 2018 - "Anyone can find themselves in prison - it doesn't take much courage", 7x7-Horizontal Russia, 1 February (Open Democracy-Russia).
- 2018 - "The wind groans or rustles: remember me, and me, and me", Sergey Lebedev talks to Yury Dmitriev, Colta.ru, 2 February (in Russian).

=== Articles about Dmitriev ===
- "Yury Dmitriev, the man who found the Solovki execution site in the groves of Sandarmokh", The Solovki Encyclopaedia (in Russian).
- Anna Yarovaya, "The Dmitriev Affair", 7x7-Horizontal Russia, 10 March 2017. (The Russian Reader website)
- Shura Burtin, "The case of Khottabych: The price for attempting to dig up the past", Russian Reporter, 30 May 2017
- John Crowfoot, "Who is Yury Dmitriev?" first published in Rights in Russia, 19 June 2017.
- Rights in Russia website. Nine articles since March 2017 about the Dmitriev case.
- Andrew Osborn, "Hunter of Stalin's mass graves on trial: friends say he's been framed", Reuters, 13 July 2017.
- Sabra Ayres, "An outspoken researcher of Stalin's crimes fights for his own fate and freedom in Russia", Los Angeles Times, 24 July 2017.
- Alec Luhn, "Gulag grave hunter unearths uncomfortable truths in Russia", The Guardian (London), 3 August 2017.
