= Myroslav Irchan =

Ukrainian writer and playwright (1897–1937)

- Мирослав Ірчан
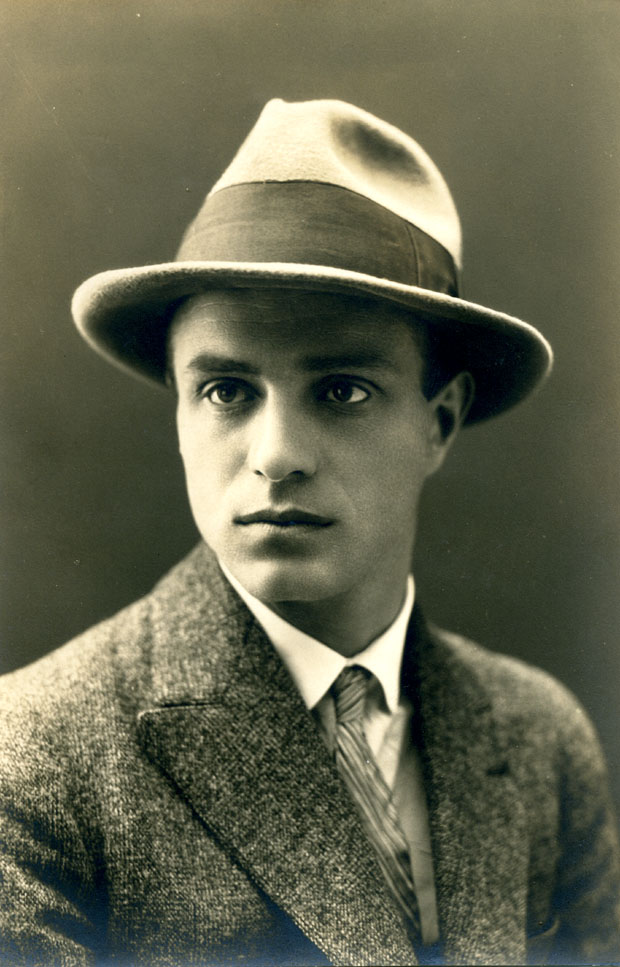
- Irchan in Winnipeg
- Born: Андрій Дмитрович Баб'юк; Andriy Dmytrovych Babiuk; 14 July 1897; Piadyky, Kingdom of Galicia and Lodomeria, Austria-Hungary (now Ukraine)
- Died: 3 November 1937 (aged 40); Sandormokh, Karelian ASSR, Russian SFSR, USSR (now Russia)
- Resting place: Sandarmokh
- Citizenship: Austria-Hungary; UNR; USSR
- Occupations: poet, novelist, essayist, playwright, translator, literary critic, journalist, historian, publisher, editor
- Political party: Communist Party of Ukraine
- Spouse: Zdenka (m. 1921)
- Children: 1
- Writing career
- Pen name: Myroslav Irchan; Yurko Ropsha; M. Zezyk
- Language: Ukrainian
- Years active: 1918–1933
- Genres: story, novel, drama
- Notable works: The Rebel, The Family of Brushmakers

Andriy Dmytrovych Babiuk (Ukrainian: Андрій Дмитрович Баб'юк; 14 July 1897 – 3 November 1937), known by the pen name Myroslav Irchan (Мирослав Ірчан), was a Ukrainian and Soviet writer, playwright and publicist. From 1923 to 1929 Irchan lived and worked in Winnipeg, Canada. Returning to the Ukrainian SSR in 1929, Irchan became the chief editor of the literary magazine Zakhidnia Ukraina (Західня Україна; lit. 'Western ukraine') before his arrest in 1933. Imprisoned at Solovki special prison for 4 years, Irchan was executed by the NKVD in 1937 and is considered part of the Executed Renaissance.

== Early life and education ==
Andriy Dmytrovych Babiuk was born on 14 July 1897 in the selo of Piadyky, Kingdom of Galicia and Lodomeria (present-day Ukraine) to Dmytro Babiuk.

In 1914, Irchan graduated from a teacher training college in Lviv.

== Ukrainian Civil War ==
The first story he wrote was at the age of 17 entitled Meeting (Зустріч) using the penname Irchan. His first collection of sketches and short stories was titled Nirvana’s Laughter (Сміх Нірвани), a condemnation of war.

He became a soldier in the Ukrainian Sich Riflemen and the Ukrainian Galician Army shortly after the outbreak of World War I. He fought in three different armies:Austro-Hungarian, Galician, and the Red Army of Ukraine. When he ended up in the ranks of the Red Ukrainian Galician Army, he edited its periodical Red Archer (Червоний Стрелец). He wrote two plays about the Ukrainian Civil War in the middle of the war. The first of these plays was The Rebel (Бунтар), begun in the Polish–Soviet War in April 1920, and completed January 12, 1921 in Uman. It received 26 performances in eight months throughout Kyiv Oblast and Podolia. Printed by Kultura publishers in 1922, 3,000 of its 10,000 copies were distributed in North America. It is set in a Galician city early in 1920, as the Red Army offensive against Poland was stalling, and tells of a failed insurrection organized by pro-Soviet Ukrainian activists in the workers' movement.

== Career ==
In 1921, Irchan settled in Kyiv where he meet his wife. The same year Irchan joined the Communist Party of Ukraine.

In 1922, Irchan moved to Prague with his wife and in-laws. In Prague, Irchan enrolled at Charles University and participated in Ukrainian student activities. He was well known as a writer by this time, and continued to publish articles and stories, some of which were printed in North America.

=== Canada ===
In 1923, Irchan was invited to come to Canada through ULTA (Ukrainian Labour Temple Association) to edit their journal Working Woman (Робітниця), to which he had already contributed articles. At this time Canadian Immigration only accepted immigrants as labourers, so he and his wife were invited to come to Canada by a Canadian farmer, in Gonor, Manitoba, where they lived for a time and he continued his literary activities.

In Canada, he was to experience the most creative literary period of his life, as editor, poet, storywriter, and playwright.

The first play he wrote in Canada was The Family of Brushmakers (Родина щіткарів). In all cases where the drama of the doubting and confused mind is Irchan's interest, his work takes on a rich texture and offers many possible readings and many complex interpretations. The Family of Brushmakers, in four acts, written between 1923–24, tells the story of a family of four people – three of whom at the outset of the play are blind. Only the son can see. In Irchan's own words, “In 1915, while I was lying ill in a German hospital in the Austrian capital Vienna, I read in a German newspaper a story in a small corner of its last page that a blind brushmaker and musician living in Germany had a blind wife and daughter. His only son, who had vision, was conscripted into the German army. In time, the son returned home, but to the glory of the Kaiser and the great German Empire, he had given up his eyesight. He had lost it during a poisonous attack at the front. So the only member of the family with sight, the son, was now blind in a blind family.” The play was a great success, staged 74 times from Montreal to Vancouver, and even the English Press had something to say about this “dangerous production”.

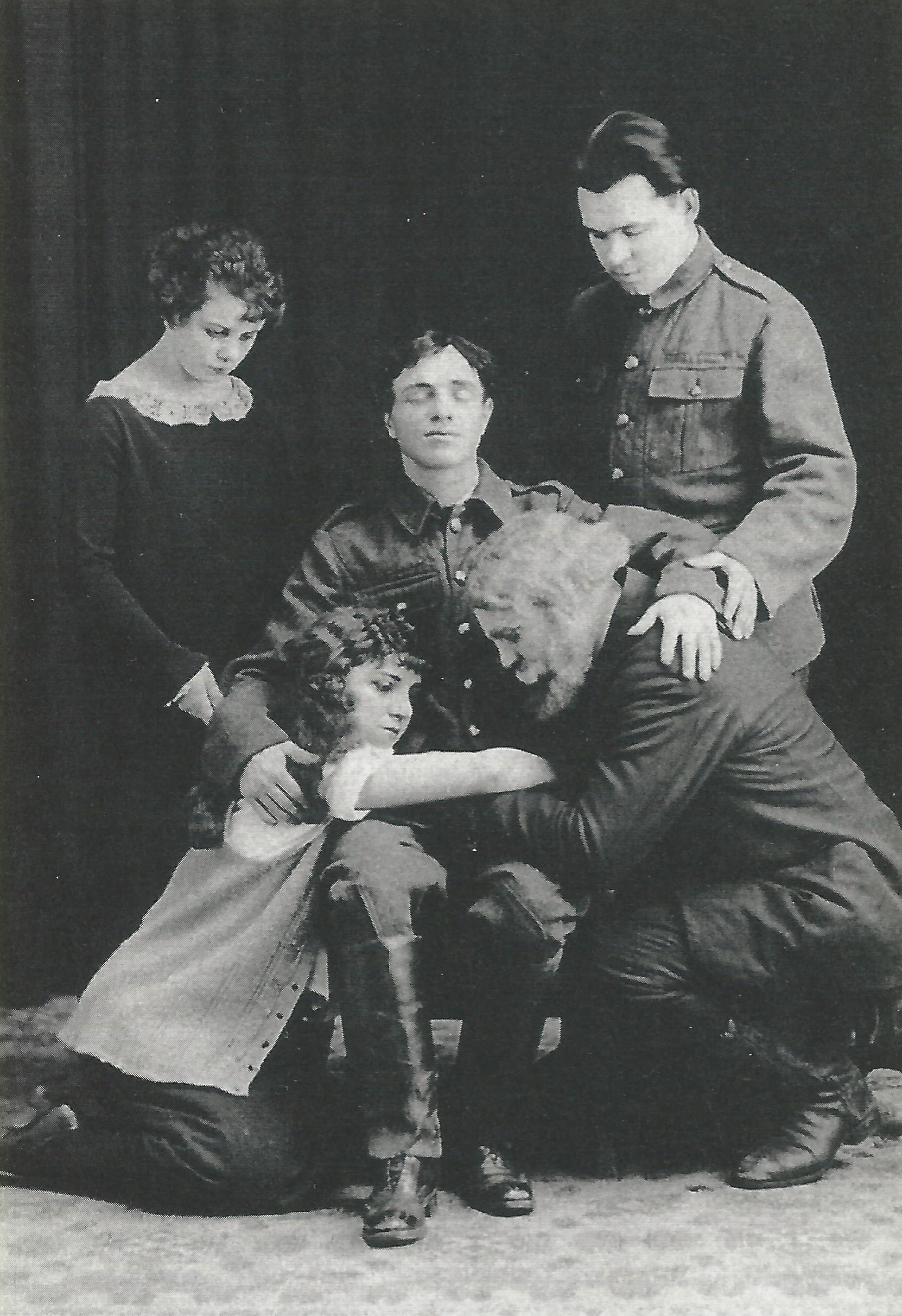
Myroslav Irchan (seated), as the son, in his play A Family of Brushmakers

The reasons for his departure from Canada are manifold. First, his wife Zdenka who was in poor health, with their daughter, Maya, returned to her parents in Prague. Secondly, the organizational activities which entangled him more and more with ULTA in Winnipeg left him little opportunity to develop as a writer. Finally, some of the membership of ULTA may have encountered problems with his work, possibly finding it too much that of the expression of an individual rather than of their organization. Whatever the reasons, on May 22, 1929, he left Winnipeg on his journey back to Europe.

=== Return to Ukraine ===
Irchan returned to Ukraine at a time when Stalin’s repression of artists, academics, and gifted individuals in all fields was intensifying.

Irchan moved to Kharkiv, at that time the capital of Soviet Ukraine. The city had writers’ organizations and publishers, and he had friends here in the writing community.

== Arrest and death ==
In 1934, he was one of many writers arrested by the State Political Administration. His wife and daughter joined him in Omsk, Siberia, though it is unclear whether Zdenka did this voluntarily. In a letter she wrote to a friend in Winnipeg, she says, “Please do not send me anymore newspapers, and notify New York to do the same thing, because they are causing me unpleasantness. Some day I will write more. Greetings to all. Zdenka.” But nothing more was heard.

Thirty-four years after Irchan's official rehabilitation in the Soviet Union, which was the result of Khrushchev's report revealing the criminal activity under Stalin's direction, the detail of Irchan's fate was made public. Irchan was interrogated by Pavel Postyshev who is considered to be one of the principal architects of the famine of 1932–1933, known in Ukraine as Holodomor. Irchan was accused of “belonging” to the nationalist Ukrainian counter-revolutionary organization, which worked to overthrow Soviet rule in Ukraine by military means. It now seems he was shot with so many other Ukrainian intellectuals on 3 November 1937 at Sandarmokh in Karelia.

== Personal life ==
In 1921, Irchan married a Czech woman called Zdenka. Irchan and Zdenka had one daughter.

== Bibliography ==
- Balan, Jars. The Ukrainian Canadian stage, in Slavic Drama. University of Ottawa, Ottawa, Canada 1991.
- Irchan, Myroslav. Internet Encyclopedia of Ukraine.
- Krawchuk, Peter. The Unforgettable Myroslav Irchan. Translated by Mary Skrypnyk. Kobzar Publishing Company Ltd., Edmonton, Alberta 1998.
- Shkandrii, Myroslav. The Rape of Civilization: Recurrent Structure in Myroslav Irchan's Prose. Journal of Ukrainian Studies 25 (2000).
