= Viktor Hurniak =

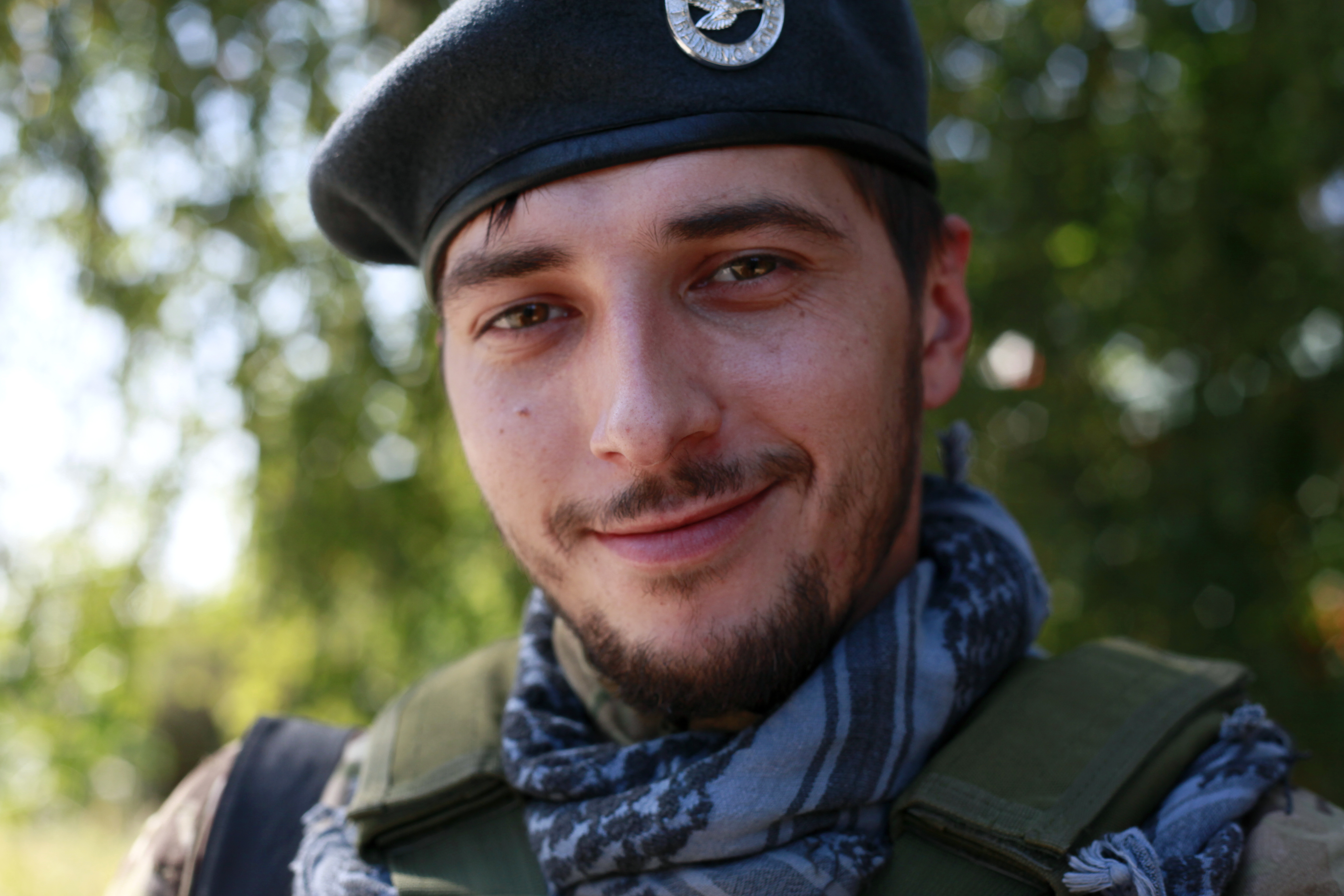
Hurniak in September 2014

Viktor Petrovych Hurniak (Ukrainian: Віктор Петрович Гурняк; 8 June 1987 – 19 October 2014), also known by the nicknames Gart, Gartik, or Oligarch, was a Ukrainian military volunteer. He served in the War in Donbas and was killed on 19 October 2014 as a result of a wound sustained from a mortar shell. He also worked as a photographer for publications such as UNIAN, Reuters and the Ukrainian publication Insider.

== Biography ==
Hurniak attended public school #27 in Ternopil, then the Technical College of the Ternopil Ivan Pul'uj National Technical University.

After university, he worked for the Ternopil newspaper 20 minutes, edited a Plast periodical The Blossom of Ukraine (Цвіт України). Headed a Youth Civic Organization "Foundation for Regional Initiatives" and worked as a press secretary for the Ternopil chapter of the political party "PORA". At some point, he married his wife Iryna and lived in Lviv. He has a daughter, Yustyna.

=== Scouting ===
Viktor joined Plast at the age of 14. He belonged to a group "Grey Wolves", which was part of the troop #29 named after Yuriy Starosolskyi. In 2004, he became one of the co-founders and the first troop leader of the troop #77 named after Ivan Havdyda. Later, he joined the "Order of the Iron Spur" Plast fraternity named after Sviatoslav the Conqueror. He also led a scout group "Eagles". Served as Deputy Head for Educational Programs in local (municipal level) and district (regional level) Plast chapters. Directed the communications division of the Ternopil chapter. Organized numerous events and activities, and served as the commander-in-charge of the national (all-Ukrainian) camp "Legion-11".

=== Military volunteering ===
In the last several months of his life, Viktor served first as a supply volunteer and later as a military volunteer in the "Aidar" battalion on the front lines of the War in Donbass. At first, Viktor helped collect funds, purchase and transport the necessary supplies and equipment to the fighters of "Aidar" and other battalions operating in the war zone. In the summer of 2014, he decided to join the ranks of "Aidar".

Viktor died on 19 October 2014 as a result of a wound sustained from a mortar shell. He came under fire while transporting the wounded troops to safety in the vicinity of checkpoint #32, near the village of Smile, Luhansk region.

=== Funeral ===
On 21 October, Viktor's native city of Ternopil gave him a hero's farewell: hundreds of Ternopilians greeted the funeral caravan at the city limits, to escort Viktor to the building where he had lived for many years and pay their last respects. In the evening, a memorial service was held at the Cathedral of the Immaculate Conception of BVM.

On 22 October 2014, a memorial service was held at the Saints Peter and Paul Garrison Church in Lviv, after which Viktor was buried at the Lychakiv Cemetery, next to the Plast monument at the site of the Memorial to the Ukrainian Galician Army. Several thousand people came to Viktor's funeral.

=== Legacy ===
Hurniak was granted the Hero of Ukraine with the Order of the Golden Star on August 28, 2021. The Plast leadership recognized his heroic deed by posthumously awarding Viktor the highest honor - Iron Cross "For meritorious deeds in the national liberation struggle for the Ukrainian state". He was also posthumously awarded the Order For Courage 3rd grade.

Ukrainian scouts from Ternopil organized sales of self-produced baked goods, arts and crafts, to raise funds for the family of their fallen friend. On 30 November, a human rights initiative "Euromaidan SOS" announced the results of its "Volunteer prize", recognizing the work of activists in 10 nomination categories. Viktor Gurniak became a laureate in the category "Person of Light".
