= Chesnokov =

Chesnokov (Russian: Чесноков; masculine) or Chesnokova (Russian: Чеснокова; feminine) is a Russian surname that is derived from the word чеснок (chesnok, meaning "garlic"). It is the last name of the following people:

- Andrei Chesnokov (born 1966), former professional tennis player
- Andriy Chesnokov
- Dmitri Chesnokov (1973–2019), Russian professional football player
- Glikeriya Vasilievna Bogdanova-Chesnokova (1904–1983), Soviet theatre and film actress, operetta's prima donna
- Mikhail Chesnokov (born 1961), retired Russian professional football player
- Pavel Chesnokov (1877–1944), Russian composer, conductor, and teacher
- Sergey Chesnokov (born 1943), Soviet/Russian scientist, researcher, mathematician, sociologist, musician, specialist in data analysis
- Valentina Feodorovna Chesnokova (1934–2010), Russian sociologist, sociopsychologist and translator of sociology works
- Yuri Chesnokov (1952–1999), Soviet football player
- Yuri Chesnokov (volleyball) (1933–2010), Russian volleyball player
