= Walter Nazarewicz =

Walter Nazarewicz (Ukrainian: Вальтер Володимир Назаревич, romanized: Valter Volodymyr Nazarevych) was a Ukrainian-American chemist born on July 18, 1927, in New York.

He came from Derevliani family of Ukrainian immigrants from Dusaniv, a village in Peremyshliany Raion, Lviv Oblast, who arrived to the US in 1916. Nazarewicz studied at the Cooper Union, where he received his undergraduate degree in chemical engineering. He then got a master's degree in chemical engineering at NYU. Once he graduated Nazarewicz joined Pfizer, where he became president of one of its divisions. Later in life Nazarewicz's career took him to Japan. There he created a subsidiary of Pfizer - Pfizer-Quigley KK - the largest steel industry in the world.

Nazarewicz became a member of the Ukrainian Institute of America, an important center of Ukrainian culture in the US. During his presidency at the institute (1981-1999), he did much to encourage new members to join. In 2007 Nazarewicz spent much time in an effort to modernize a steel plant in Mariupol, Ukraine. He also reconnected with his long lost relatives, who in 1947 were deported from Ukraine to the gulag in Magadan, Russia.

In honor of his collaboration with Bohdan Havrylyshyn the International Management Institute gave one of their departments his name. He devoted himself to philanthropy until his death on November 20, 2011.
