= Scouting and Guiding in Ukraine =

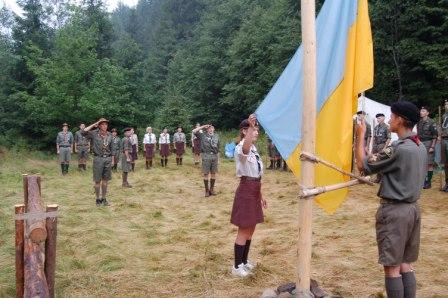
Ukrainian Scout camp held by Plast

Scouting in Ukraine received World Organization of the Scout Movement (WOSM) recognition in July 2008. The Eurasian Region headquarters is located on Ukrainian territory.

== 2008 WOSM recognition ==
The World Scout Bureau received an application for membership of the World Organization from the National Organization of Scouts of Ukraine (NOSU). In accordance with the requirements of the Constitution of WOSM, the World Scout Committee considered this application at its meeting on 29 February-2 March 2008, and recommended that it be accepted. Under the terms of Article VI.2 of the WOSM Constitution, “if within three months the recommendation is unopposed or opposed by less than five percent of the Member Organizations”, NOSU was declared a Member, as the National Scout Organization of Ukraine, of the World Organization of the Scout Movement as from 1 July 2008.

== Ukrainian Scout organizations ==
- National Organization of Scouts of Ukraine, member of the World Organization of the Scout Movement; 4,650 individual members. This organization was founded by Plast, Sich and SPOK organizations so Ukrainian Scouts could be represented in WOSM; however these organizations still are separate and do not belong to NOSU. Membership in NOSU is individual for any Scout of Ukraine.
- Asotsiatsiya Haydiv Ukrayiny ("Association of Ukrainian Guides"), member of the World Association of Girl Guides and Girl Scouts, with 968 members
- Asotsiatsiya Skautiv Ukraïni ("Association of Scouts of Ukraine" ASU, Ukrainian-speaking)
- ISKRA (Spark) Crimean Scout Association, supported by the Scouts de France
- Kárpátaljai Magyar Cserkészszövetség (KáMCSSZ), ethnic Hungarian Scouts in Ukraine linked to Magyar Cserkészszövetség
- Khar'kovskaya Oblastnaya Organizatsiya Skautov ("Kharkiv Oblast Organization of Scouts"/Харьковская Областная Организация Скаутов, Russian-speaking)
- Luhans'ka Oblasna Organizatsiya Skautiv ("Luhansk Oblast Organization of Scouts"/Луганська обласна Организация Скаутів, Ukrainian-speaking)
- Plast, the largest Scouting organization in Ukraine
  - Chornomortsi, "Sailors of the Black Sea"
  - Ulad Starshoho Plastunstva ("Order of Senior Scouting", Ukrainian Rovers)
- Vseukrajinska molodizhna gromadska organizatsiya "SPOK (Спілка піонерських організацій міста Києва/"Union of Pioneer Organizations of Kyiv" 1990-1992, Спілка дитячих та юнацьких організацій міста Києва/"Union of the Children and Youth organizations of the City of Kyiv" 1993-2003, since 2003 the Всеукраїнська молодіжна громадська організація "СПОК"/All Ukrainian Youth Public Organization "SPOK") SPOK is an acrostic of the four words of the organization's motto (S – самостійність (samostijnist') independence, P – порядність (poryadnist') decency, O – оптимізм (optimizm) optimism, кмітливість (kmitlyvist') quick-wittedness)
- All-Ukrainian organization Sich (Січ) meaning Cossack fortress
- Ruthenian Girl and Boy Scouts (Rusyn Slavic minority, known as Русины, referred to as Carpatho-Rusyns and Rusniaks)
- Spilka Ukraïns'koï Molodi (Спілка української молоді "Ukrainian Youth Association", SUM)
- Skif PLUS (Днепропетровская Областная Детская Общественная Организация "Скиф Плюс") - regional organization of Dnipropetrovsk Oblast
- Organizatsiya Ukraïns'kykh Skautiv (Organization of Ukrainian Scouts), member of the Order of World Scouts
- YMCA Scouts of Ukraine

== Program and methods ==
There is an educational method which functions to reach educational goals of Scout movement in Ukraine. The main principles of the Scout method are voluntary membership in the organization, education through games and work, gradual engagements and tests, group system of self-organization, knowledge of environment through living in nature, support for special hobbies, interests and abilities of young people.

The Scout Motto for ethnic Ukrainian Scouting organizations is Будь напоготові!, "Be Prepared!".

The Ukrainian noun for a single Scout is Skaut. A Ukrainian who attributes themselves to the Plast organization is named or Plastun, to the СУМ organization is named Sumivets.

== Jamborees ==
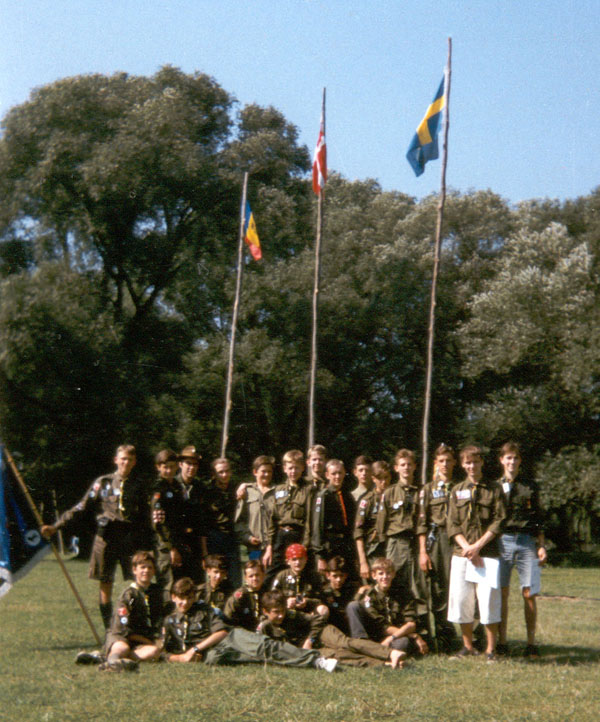
Participants of the 1st Ukrainian Scout Jamboree (1996)

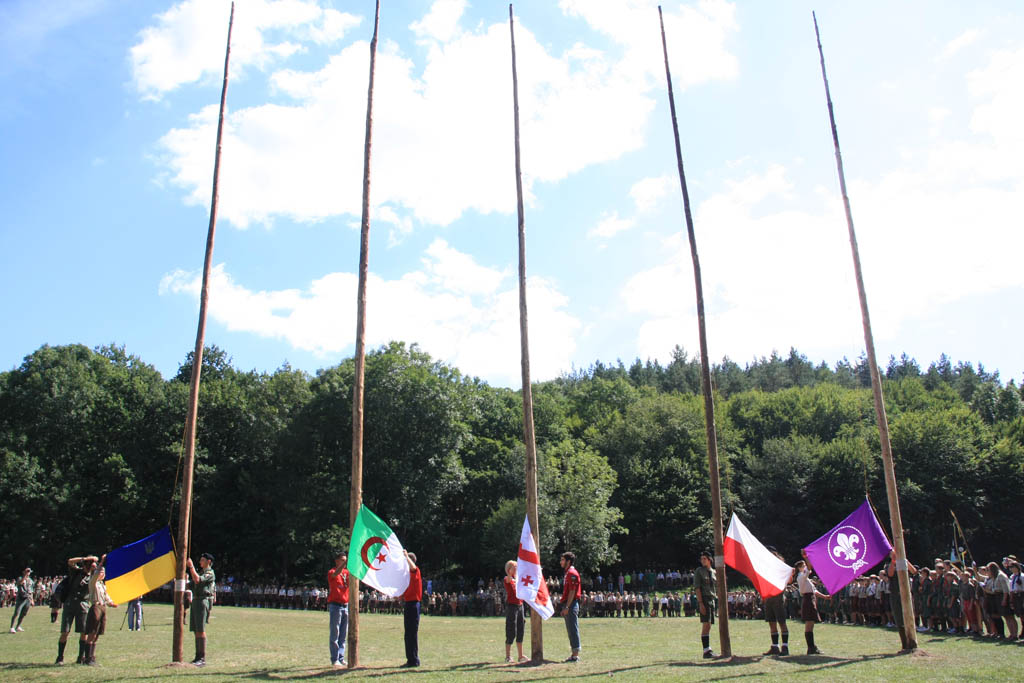
2nd Ukrainian Scout Jamboree opening ceremony (2009)

The First Ukrainian Scout Jamboree (Ukrainian: Перше всеукраїнське скаутське джемборі) was held from August 15–25, 1996 near Nevytsky Castle in Zakarpattia Oblast. It was organized by the Lisovi Chorty, a service fraternity within Plast. More than 700 plastuns from Ukraine, Slovakia, Poland, USA, Canada, Germany and Scouts and Guides from other Ukrainian Scout organizations as well as international guests from Sweden, Moldova, Denmark, France and Poland took part.

The Second Ukrainian Scout Jamboree (Ukrainian: Друге всеукраїнське скаутське джемборі), celebrating the 20th anniversary of Plast and Scouting renewal in Ukraine, took place in the valley of Dzhurynskyy waterfall, Zalishchynskyy district, Ternopil Oblast near Chervonohorod castle. More than 1300 Plastuns and Ukrainian Scouts from all regions of Ukraine and from the USA, Germany, Estonia and Belgium were registered at Jamboree. Among the Ukrainian participants of the Jamboree, there were Scouts from Algeria, Georgia and Poland.

== Celebration of Centenary of Ukrainian Scouting (2011-2012) ==
November 1, 2011 - the Parliament of Ukraine (Verkhovna Rada) adopted the Resolution "On the Celebration of 100th Anniversary of Ukrainian Scout Movement", initialized by NOSU;

April 21, 2012 - Ukrainian scouts were parading on the main street of Kyiv - the capital of Ukraine, celebrating 100 years from the date of the first Ukrainian Scout Oath;

April 28- May 2, 2012 the All-Ukrainian Centenary Scout Forum took place. President of Ukraine congratulated Ukrainian scouts on 100th anniversary of the national movement;

April 29, 2012 "100 years of Ukrainian Scouting" memorial was inaugurated in the Korsun-Shevchenko district of Cherkasy region of Ukraine.

== Emblems ==
National Organization of Scouts of Ukraine

All-Ukrainian organization Sich

Association of Scouts of Ukraine

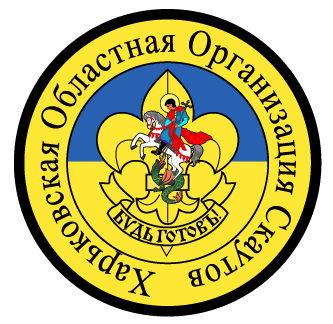
Kharkiv Oblast Organization of Scouts

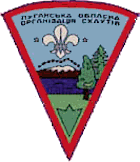
Luhansk Oblast Organization of Scouts

Organizatsiya Ukraïns'kykh Skautiv

Ruthenian Girl and Boy Scouts

Skif Dnipropetrovsk Oblast Organization of Scouts

Spilka Ukraïns'koï Molodi

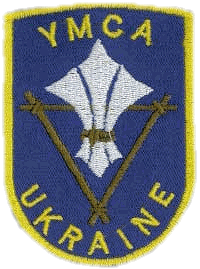
Ukraine YMCA Scouts

PLAST — National Scouting Organization of Ukraine

== International Scout units in Ukraine ==
In addition, there are Girl Scouts of the USA Overseas in Kyiv, serviced by way of USAGSO headquarters in New York City; as well as Cub Scout Pack 3980 and Boy Scout Troop 980, both of Kyiv, linked to the Direct Service branch of the Boy Scouts of America, which supports units around the world. Finally, Russian émigré Scout organizations, generally aligned to either NORS or ORYuR but not connected with RAS/N, have independent branches in Ukraine.

== See also ==
- Scouting in displaced persons camps
- Ukrainian Sich Riflemen
