= Asotsiatsiya Haydiv Ukraïni =

- Association of Ukrainian Guides
- Location: Kyiv
- Country: Ukraine
- Founded: 1992
- Membership: 1,000
- Website https://www.girlguiding.org.ua/

The Asotsiatsiya Haydiv Ukraïni (Асоціація Гайдів України, Association of Ukrainian Guides) is the national Guiding organization of Ukraine. Guiding in Ukraine began in 1911 and, after being banned in the 1920s, it was restarted in 1992. It became an associate member of the World Association of Girl Guides and Girl Scouts (WAGGGS) in 1999 and a full member in 2020. The girls-only association has 1,000 members, as of 2003.

== History ==
Guiding in Ukraine started in 1911 as part of Plast. However, in the 1920s, Scouting and Guiding was banned and the groups were incorporated in the Pioneer Movement.

After the dissolution of the Soviet Union, Guiding was reintroduced to Ukraine in 1992. With support by the Norwegian Speidernes Fellesorganisasjon, a national association was formed on November 25, 1995. It became an associate member of WAGGGS in 1999 and a full member in 2020.

== Program and ideals ==
The association is divided in three age groups:

- Swallows (ages 7 to 11)
- Guides (ages 11 to 16)
- Rangers (ages 16 to 20)

The Girl Guide emblem incorporates a brownie as well as grapes.

== See also ==
- Scouting in Ukraine
