= Lubomyr Romankiw =

Canadian-American computer scientist and researcher (1931–2024)

- Любомир Романків
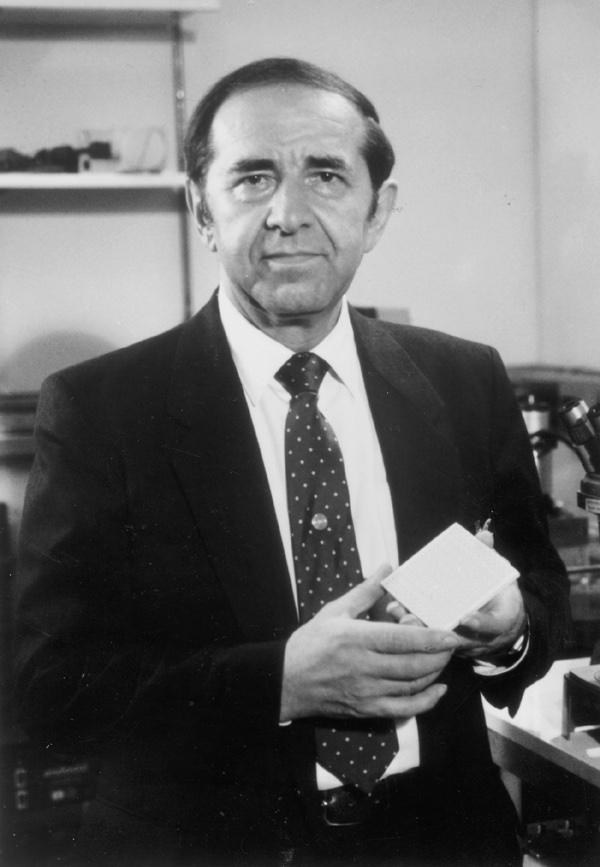
- Born: April 17, 1931; Zhovkva, Lwów Voivodeship, Second Polish Republic (now Ukraine)
- Died: June 27, 2024 (aged 93); New Jersey, United States

Lubomyr Taras Romankiw (Note: Ukrainian: Любомир Тарас Романків, romanized: Liubomyr Taras Romankiv) (April 17, 1931 – June 27, 2024) was a Ukrainian-Canadian-American electrochemist, material scientist and engineer, and inventor. Although a Canadian citizen, he spent his entire career at IBM's Thomas J. Watson Research Center in Yorktown Heights, New York. He was an IBM fellow, the highest technical ranking at IBM.

Romankiw earned his B.Sc. from the University of Alberta in 1957, and both M.S. and Ph.D. degrees (in metallurgy and materials) from the Massachusetts Institute of Technology in 1962. His Ph.D. dissertation was titled "Kinetics of dissolution of zinc sulfide in aqueous sulfuric acid", under the advisory of Professor P. L. de Bruyn. Romankiw is listed as a co-inventor on over 90 U.S. patents, 150 papers and edited 10 volumes of various technical symposia.

== Background ==
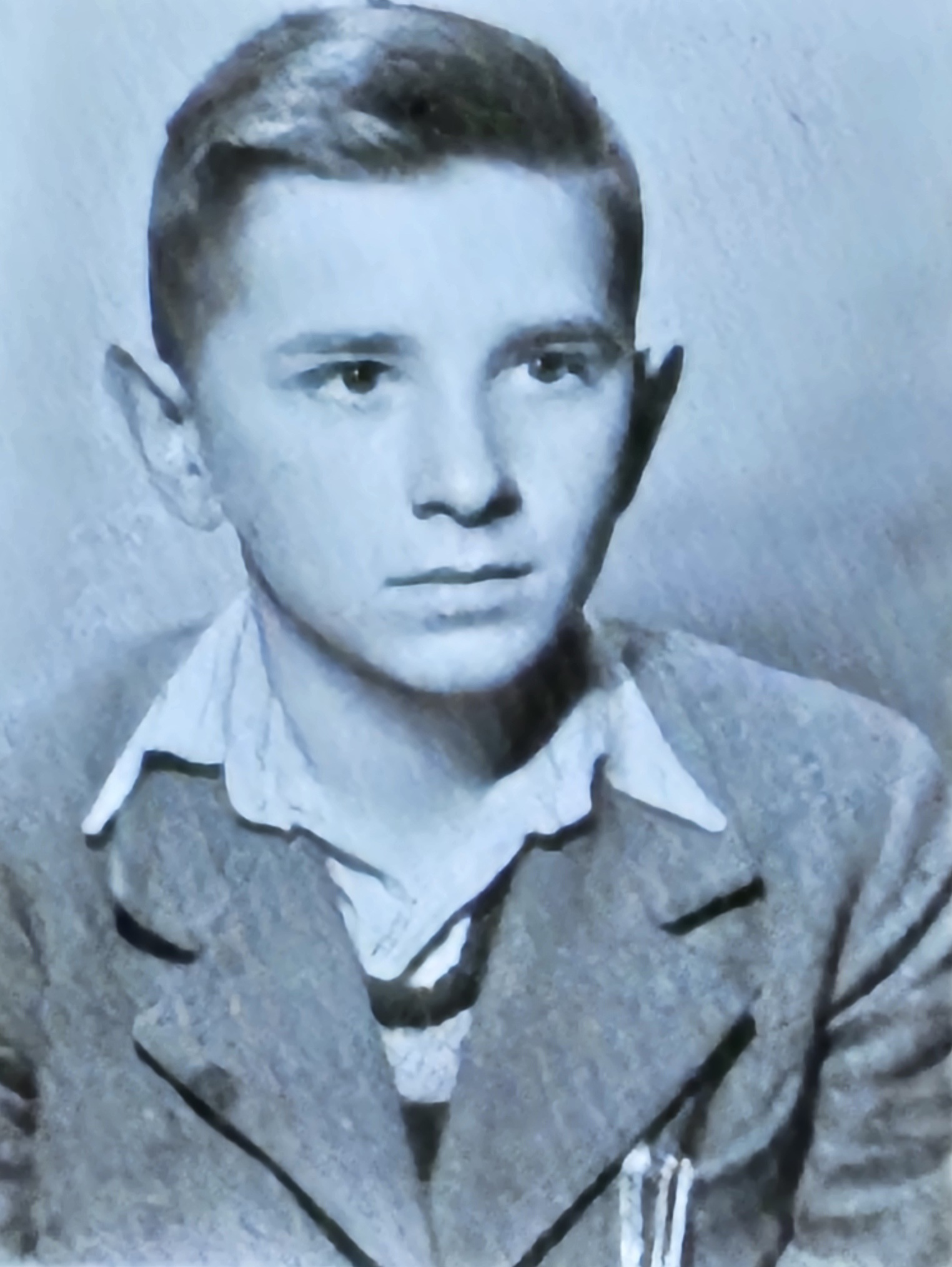
Luby in his childhood

Romankiw was born on April 17, 1931, in Zhovkva, then part of Poland, nowadays Ukraine. Much of his work involved magnetic materials, reflective displays, and copper plating. While working for IBM, the inventor developed magnetic thin-film storage heads (co-invented with David Thompson in the 1970s), a revolutionary technology for recording and reading information on hard drives. He was an IBM fellow, a member of the IBM Academy of Technology, an IEEE fellow, and an Electrochemical Society fellow.

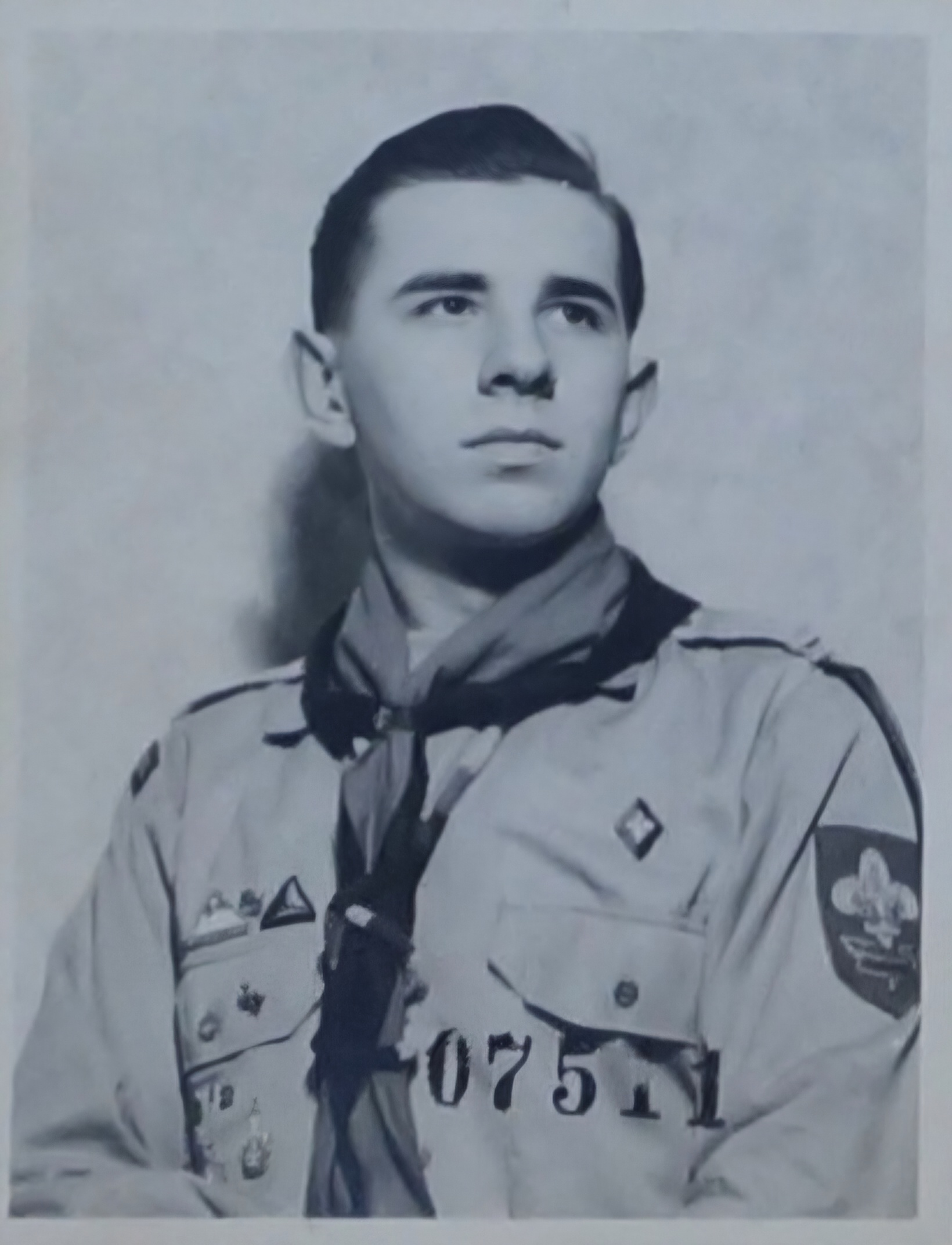
Luby in his youth.

He received the Perkin Medal from the Society of Chemical Industry in 1993, the Vittorio de Nora Award from the Electrochemical Society in 1994, and the 1994 IEEE Morris N. Liebmann Memorial Award.

In March 2012, he was inducted into the National Inventors Hall of Fame. In 2014, he was elected as a foreign member of the National Academy of Engineering of the United States for his innovation of thin-film magnetic head structures and electrochemical process technologies for microelectronics device fabrication.

He was active in various organizations, most notably serving as the Nachalniy Plastun (Chief Scout) of the Plast National Scout Organization of Ukraine. Romankiw was a member of the Shevchenko Scientific Society, USA.

Romankiw died in the United States on June 27, 2024, at the age of 93.

== Invention of Thin Film Heads ==
By the 1960s, the earlier version of magnetic storage, the IBM drum storage was approaching its storage limit. Hand-made and assembled copper-wired heads were becoming too small to become extendible to smaller size and scalable to higher areal density storage per square inch.

The challenges to extend the storage technology at that time were: 1, to achieve areal density beyond 3 Megabits per square inch; and 2, to batch fabricate the read/write heads. Romankiw invented several key inventions that enabled the extendibility of the magnetic storage technology.

1. US patent 3,908,194, Integrated magnetoresistive read, inductive write, batch fabricated magnetic head. This is the design of an integrated thin film head, which includes both the read and the write functionality, and which remains largely unchanged for decades. More details see Disk read-and-write head.

2. US patent 4,295,173, Thin Film Inductive Transducer. This is the design of the writer in the thin film heads, where a magnetic yoke made with specific magnetic materials (permalloy) is magnetized with copper coils. The design of the structure allows for high frequency switching and high magnetization at the yoke tip, which enables high frequency data writing with high fidelity.

3. US patent 3,840,898, Self-biased Magnetoresistive Sensor. This is the design of the reading part in the thin film heads. This design allows the miniaturization of the magnetoresistive sensor, which reads in 1 or 0 data on the storage media.

4. US patent 4,281,057, Variable Pre-spin Drying Time Control of Photoresists Thickness.

5. US patent 4,315,985, Fine-line circuit fabrication and photoresist application thereof.

6. US patent 3,853,715, Elimination of undercut in an anodically active metal during chemical etching.

These three patents above invented and enabled the so-called "Electroplating through mask", where the electroplated parts are well defined with patterned photoresist using photolithography. This is also an early version of the LIGA process used widely for MEMS fabrication. This innovative process was a key enabler for the fabrication of the thin film heads.

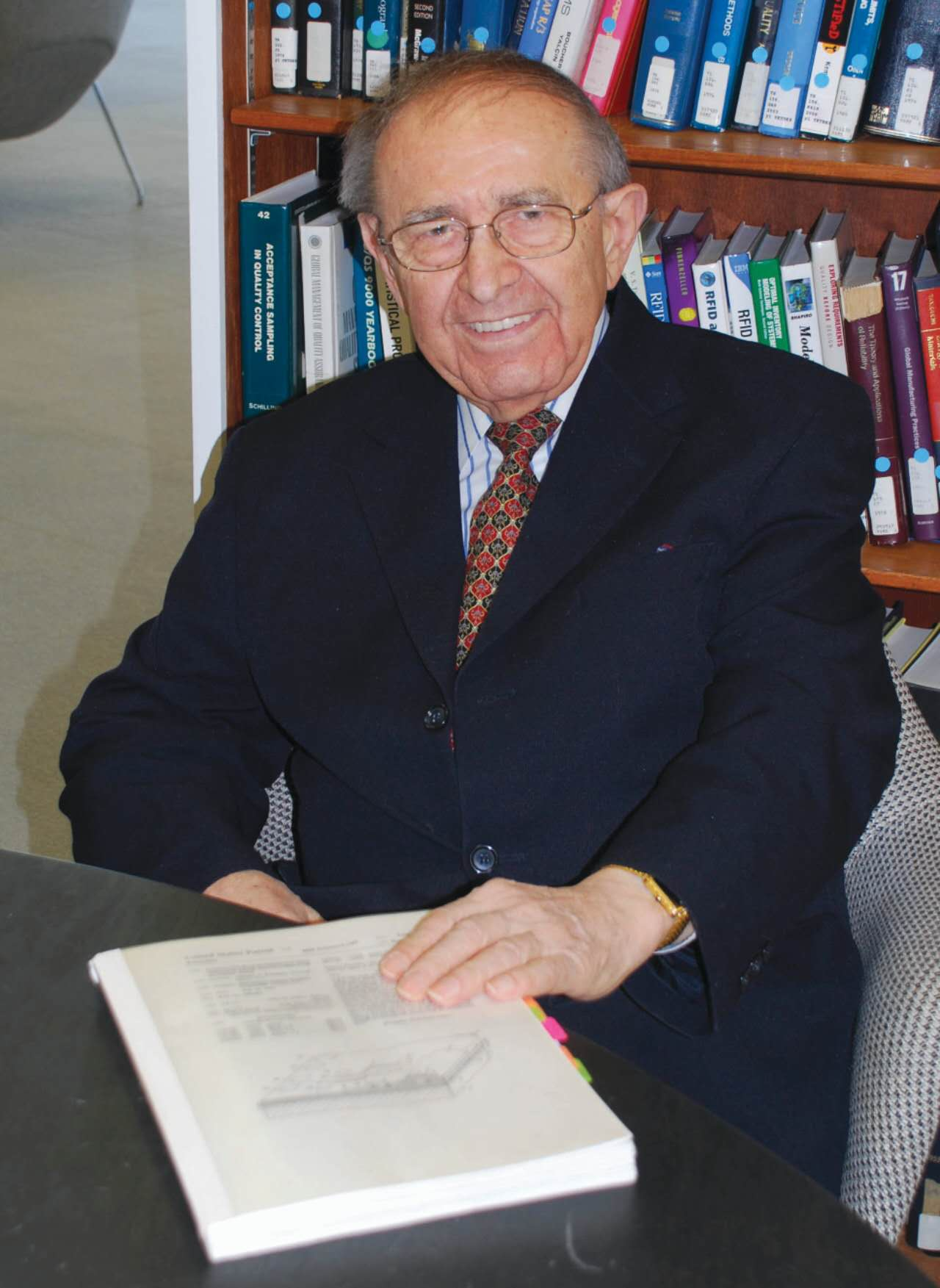
Luby with a collection of his inventions.

7. US patent 3,652,442, Electroplating cell including means to agitate the electrolyte in laminar flow. This is the instrument Romankiw invented to allow him to make the magnetic film for thin film head. This cell uses an innovative means to agitate the solution, with a reciprocating paddle, to provide laminar flow agitation with uniform and well controlled diffusion layer thickness. This enables the precise control of the composition of permalloy and other magnetic alloy film in a manufacturing scale. This tool also allows the application of an external magnetic field during electroplating that creates magnetic anisotropy in the film during deposition. The correct orientation of the magnetic easy axis with respect to the magnetic yoke configuration is a critical requirement for fast switching of the magnetization and fast writing.

8. US patent 5,516,412. Vertical Paddle Cell. This is a follow on invention of the previous one, also with a reciprocating paddle for electroplating, but in a vertical configuration, enabling easier and faster loading / unloading of wafers, and also avoiding particle dropping from anode.

9. US patent 4,102,756. Nickel-iron (80:20) alloy thin film electroplating method and electrochemical treatment and plating apparatus. This is the permalloy thin film electroplated using Romankiw's plating cell and process. This alloy has been the material of choice for Disk read-and-write head for decades until the early 2000s.

10. US patent 4,003,768, Method for treating magnetic alloy to increase the magnetic permeability. This is the method of thermal annealing the electroplating permalloy in a magnetic field to further improve the permeability in the easy axis, to further improve the magnetization, magnetic switching, and the writing performance.

In addition to the thin film heads, Luby's inventions also contribute to the controlled collapse chip connection, or the flip chip packaging technology for computer processor, copper interconnects, advanced packaging, thin film solar cell, and on-chip inductive power convertor.

== Awards ==
- The Electrochemical Society Electrodeposition division Research award, 1984
- IEEE Fellow, 1986
- The Electrochemical Society Fellow, 1990
- Society of Chemical Industry Perkin Medal, 1993
- The Electrochemical Society Vittorio De Nora Award, 1994
- IEEE Morris N. Liebmann Memorial Award, 1994.
- The Electrochemical Society honorary member, 2003.
- The National Inventors Hall of Fame inductee, 2012.
- The National Academy of Engineering foreign member, 2014.
- Order of Prince Yaroslav the Wise, 2020.

== Notes ==
Preceded by	Chief Scout of Plast –	Succeeded by
