= Plast =

National scout organisation in Ukraine

Plast – National Scout Organization of Ukraine
- The membership badge of Plast incorporates elements of the coat of arms of Ukraine
- Пласт — Національна Скаутська Організація України
- Headquarters: Kyiv, Ukraine
- Location: Predominantly in Ukraine, smaller divisions within Ukrainian diaspora around the world
- Country: Ukraine
- Founded: First groups in 1911, officially established on 12 April 1912
- Founders: Oleksandr Tysovsky, Ivan Chmola, Petro Franko
- Affiliation: World Organization of the Scout Movement
- Website en.plast.org.ua

The Plast National Scout Organization of Ukraine (Ukrainian: Національна Скаутська Організація України «Пласт», romanized: Natsionalna Skautska Orhanizatsiia Ukrainy "Plast"), commonly called Ukrainian Plast or simply Plast, is the largest Scouting organization in Ukraine.

== History ==
=== First Era: 1911–1920 ===
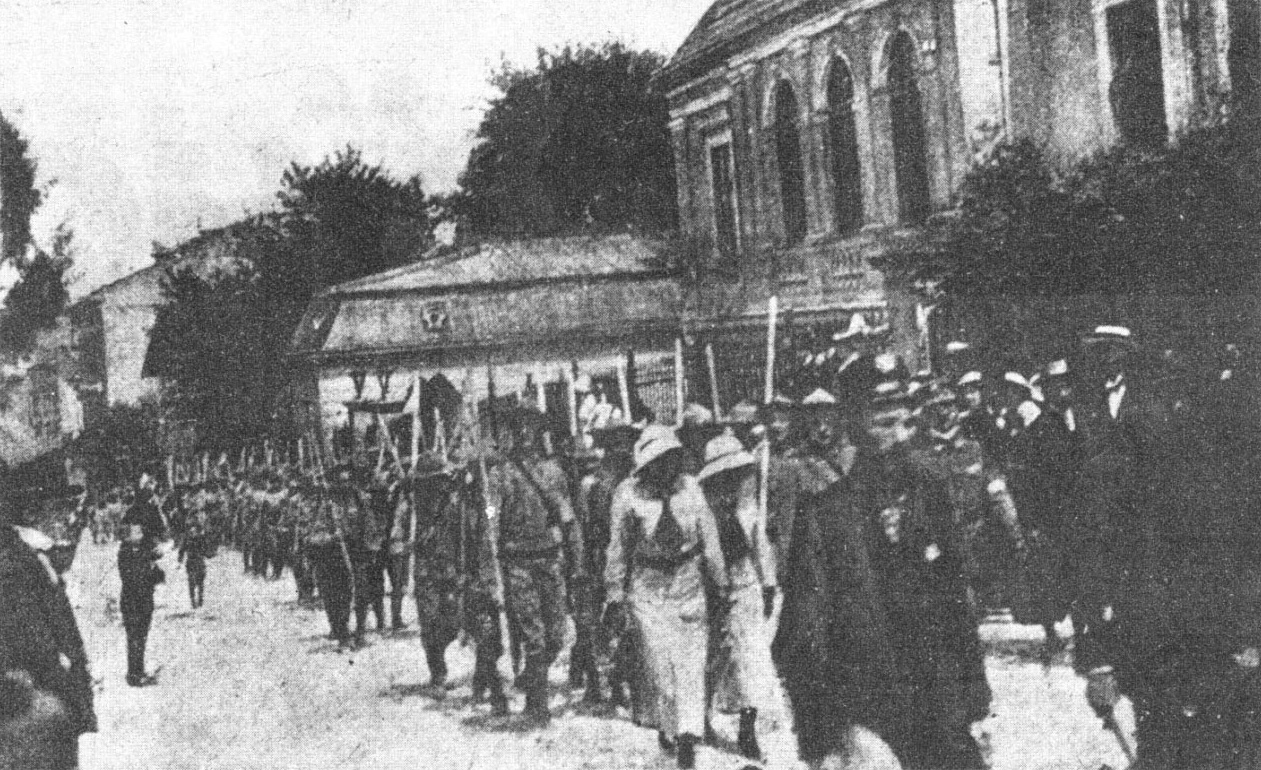
March of Plastuny, 1914

Plast was founded in Lviv (Lwów, Lemberg), Austro-Hungarian Galicia in 1911. It became the first Ukrainian Scouting organization. In Ukrainian, plastun is a historical name for a Cossack scout and sentry serviceman. The founder of Ukrainian Scouting, Oleksander Tysovsky, affectionately known as "Drot," adapted the universal Scout principles to the needs and interests of Ukrainian youth.

Born during great social and political upheavals in Europe, the Ukrainian Plast came into being to fulfill specific national aims, alike the Sokol movement in Bohemia and Poland and Polish Scouting founded in 1910 in Lwów, but unlike most other Scout organizations. The first Scouting troops were formed in Lviv in 1911 by Petro Franko and Ivan Chmola. Stepan Bandera’s uncle, Osyp Bandera, was an active socio-political figure. He had been a member of Plast since 1912 and led a local scout group.

Scouting spread rapidly to the other cities and towns, and by 1913 the first Supreme Scout Council had been formed and the first handbook published. The same year, the Orhanizatsiyniy Plast Komitet was formed in Lviv by Plast groups from different regions, and the first hiking camp was organized. By 1914, Plast squads existed in all Ukrainian gymnasiums of Galicia. In Bukovyna, Ukrainian school youth organized into a "Plast Regiment" named after Ivan Bohun, which included around 800 participants. In June 1914, Plast members from Galicia and Bukovyna gathered in a congress in Lviv. In the same year, a travelling camp was organized by the Plast in Chornohora.

With the start of the First World War, many members of the Plast enlisted into the Legion of Ukrainian Sich Riflemen. By 1916, its membership exceeded 10,000, and it was a fully- developed and functioning organization, consisting of separate branches of Boy Scouts and Girl Guides. Ukrainian Plast held regular camps for Cubs, Scouts and Rovers, training courses for leaders, and produced a variety of Scout publications, including a Ukrainian translation of Scouting for Boys.

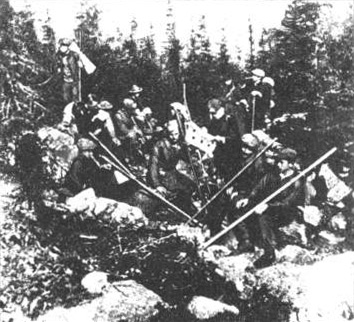
Plastuny on the mountain Chornohora, 1914

World War I brought about the collapse of the two powers occupying ethnic Ukrainian territory, Austria-Hungary and the Russian Empire, and the formation of the Ukrainian National Republic in 1918. The subsequent years witnessed a great upswing in Scouting, as it spread into the towns and communities where it had been previously unknown, mainly in the newly freed central provinces of Ukraine. Hundreds, if not thousands, of boys, inspired by the ideals of service to God and Country which Scouting engenders, volunteered to join the armed forces, fighting on several fronts, and many gave their lives. In 1918 the Supreme Plast Council was created, headed by O. Tysovsky. In Dnieper Ukraine several branches of Plast were organized by activists of Sich and Prosvita societies.

=== Second Era: 1920–1930 ===
The Soviet victory in the civil war in 1922 led to an immediate abolition of all non-communist scout activities in this region. In the Romanian area of Bukovina, the development of Plast was likewise hampered. Ukrainian Scouting was among the first to suffer what later became the fate of many scout associations throughout the world. In areas of Western Ukraine, which included parts of Czechoslovakia and Poland, the Scout movement emerged from the ruins of war with renewed vitality. During this period, Ukrainian Scouting first requested international recognition, but was denied on political grounds.

In spite of numerous obstacles, Plast developed rapidly in the Polish areas, with high levels of membership among students, farmers and workers. A key sponsor was Metropolitan Andrey Sheptytsky, the Archbishop of the Ukrainian Greek Catholic Church (1901–1944), who donated a campsite called "Sokil" in the Carpathian Mountains. A number of publications are introduced, including the official organ Molode Zhyttia and Oleksander Tysovsky's seminal handbook, Zhyttia v Plasti (1921). Plast groups, later transferred into regiments and kurins, appeared in almost all Ukrainian middle schools of Eastern Galicia, and also spread to Volyn, where they were supported by local branches of the Prosvita society.

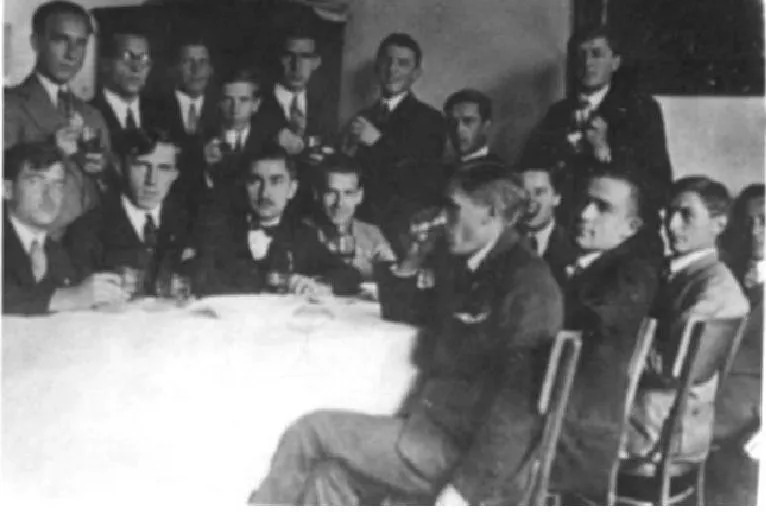
Members of the Chervona kalyna Plast kurin in 1928, including Stepan Bandera

In 1924, the Supreme Plast Congress elected the executive organ of the movement - the High Plast Command, headed by Severyn Levytskyi. Youth Plast organizations were additionally supported by the creation of Plast squads among university students, adults and younger children. By 1930 Plast had 6000 members in Western Ukraine. In the late 1920s, external pressure on the part of the Polish authorities seriously impaired further growth of Plast on its territory, and eventually led to an outright abolition of Ukrainian Scouting in 1928 in the Volyn region, and in Halychyna in 1930. However, Plast continued to flourish in Carpathian Ruthenia, the ethnic Ukrainian area within Czechoslovakia, and maintained a close liaison with the underground Scout units in parts of central Ukraine under the Soviet Union until World War II and Western Ukraine under Poland. The Plast groups in Carpathian Ruthenia and Prague were members of the Union of Junak Scouts and Guides of the Republic of Czechoslovakia and through this federation of the two World organizations. A headquarters was opened in Prague. Ukrainian Scouts took part in the 3rd World Scout Jamboree at Arrowe Park, England, in 1929, and as part of the Czechoslovak contingent in the 4th Jamboree at Gödöllő, Hungary, in 1933, attempting to make world scouting aware of the suppression of free Scout activities in Ukraine.

=== Third Era: 1930–1944 ===
In Western Ukraine, Plast, though banned, continued to operate illegally and conspirationally under the auspices of the Plast Center. Plast activities continued to be undertaken, via the Commission of Educational Campsites, the "Ridna Shkola" and published in the journal Vohni.

The Polish leadership pursued this activity and punished such activities with arrests and internment. These actions were opposed through the creation of a secret Plast Centre in 1934. Underground Plast camps during that period were organized by the Ukrainian Hygienic Society and the specially "Commission of Educational Houses and Youth Travel". Publication in the press allowed members of the organization to preserve contact with school students.

In 1939, World War II broke out and membership in Plast saw a resurgence in western Ukraine. Although the occupying German forces again banned Plast, its activity continued. As in the previous war, many plastuny took up arms in various armies that traversed western and eastern Ukraine during the war. Many members of the Plast took part in the activities of the Carpathian Sich, which led to the closure of the organization by Hungarian authorities after the occupation of Carpatho-Ukraine.

During the years under Communism and the Soviet Union, Scouting was banned in Ukraine, but the Plast organization continued to exist in exile around the world.

=== Fourth Era: 1945–1950 ===
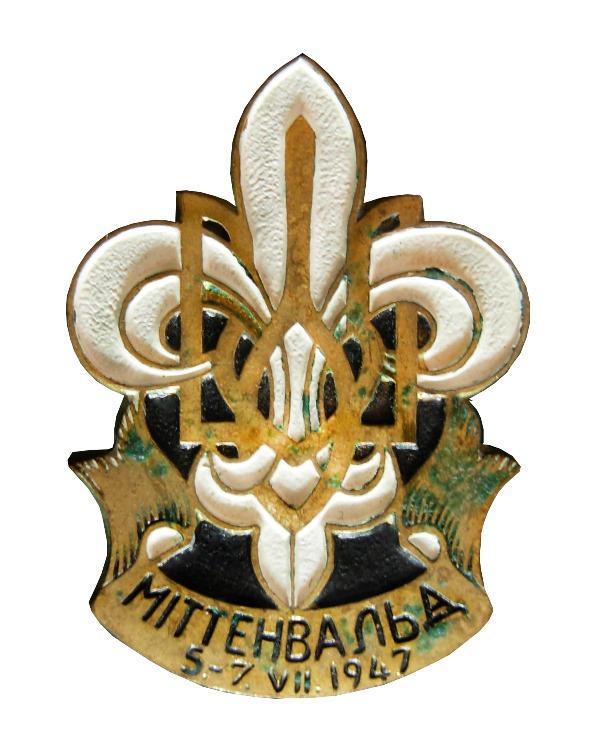
Ukrainian Plast Rally badge. The activity was held in Mittenwald on 5–7 July 1947.

Ukrainian Scouting was hampered by World War II, but Plast managed to survive the war and began to flourish again in the displaced persons camps under the occupation of the Western Powers. The successful commemoration of the 35th Anniversary of the Movement in 1947 was the highlight of Plast activities at that time. Multiple groups of plastuny met at the Holovna Plastova Rada in Munich.

Ukrainian Scouting became a member of the Displaced Persons Division of the Boy Scouts International Bureau. A delegation of over 40 Scouts and Scouters participated in the sixth World Scout Jamboree at Moisson in 1947 and a smaller group in the seventh World Jamboree at Bad Ischl in 1951.

After the mass resettlement of Ukrainians between 1948 and 1950, Plast was reorganized and branches permanently established in a number of western countries with large Ukrainian communities, such as the United States, Canada, Australia, France, Austria, the United Kingdom, Germany and Argentina, where it continues to flourish and expand.

=== Fifth Era: 1950–1989 ===
Ukrainian Scouting was represented at the ninth World Scout Jamboree at Sutton Coldfield in 1957, at the second and third World Scout Indabas and at the tenth World Scout Jamboree at Makiling Park in 1959. Ukrainian Scouters delegated by the Executive Council participated as observers in the sixteenth and seventeenth International Conferences in 1957 and 1959, respectively.

In 1957, Plast celebrated its 45th anniversary with a national camp in their training and camping centre Plastova Sich in Canada. Oleksander Tysovsky took part in this camp.

In the summer of 1962, Ukrainian Scouting celebrated its 50th anniversary with a national jamboree on its own permanent campsite ("Vovcha Tropa") at East Chatham, New York, in which over 2,000 members, as well as scouts of other national associations participated. Subsequent anniversaries were celebrated in 1967 at Batyrin, South Bolton, Quebec, and participants performed at Expo67 honoring the Canadian Centennial, and 1972 (again in East Chatham, New York), 1978 (Alberta, Canada) and every five years thereafter.

In 1976 Plast was among the founder members of the Associated International Scout and Guide Organizations in 1976. An umbrella organization for Scouts-in-Exile.

The location of Plast's global headquarters would vary based on the leadership elected at each Holovna Plastova Rada, although the centers of administration tended to be New York City and Toronto, Canada.

Plast was quite active in publishing, with the key publications:

- Hotuis (for novaky or New Scouts)
- Yunak (for yunaky or Scouts)
- Plastoviy Shliakj (for starshi plastuny and seniory, that is Older Scouts and Senior Scouts).
- Vohon' Orlynoyi Rady (for leaders and counselors to novaky)
- V dorohu z Yunatstvom (for leaders and counselors to yunaky)
- Av-u and Tam-Tam (for members of the Siromantsi fraternity)
- OX Kvartal'nyk (for members of the Orden Khrestonostsiv fraternity)

And numerous local, regional and fraternal bulletins, publications, journals and handbooks, many of which were published by Plast Publishing.

In addition to creating over a dozen campsites, Plast members built or acquired over 30 facilities or domivky where they could hold activities, generally on a weekly basis. Several stores, including Molode Zhyttia in New York City, provided uniforms, emblems, publications and other goods. Several foundations and organizations provided and continue to provide support.

=== Sixth Era: 1990 to present ===
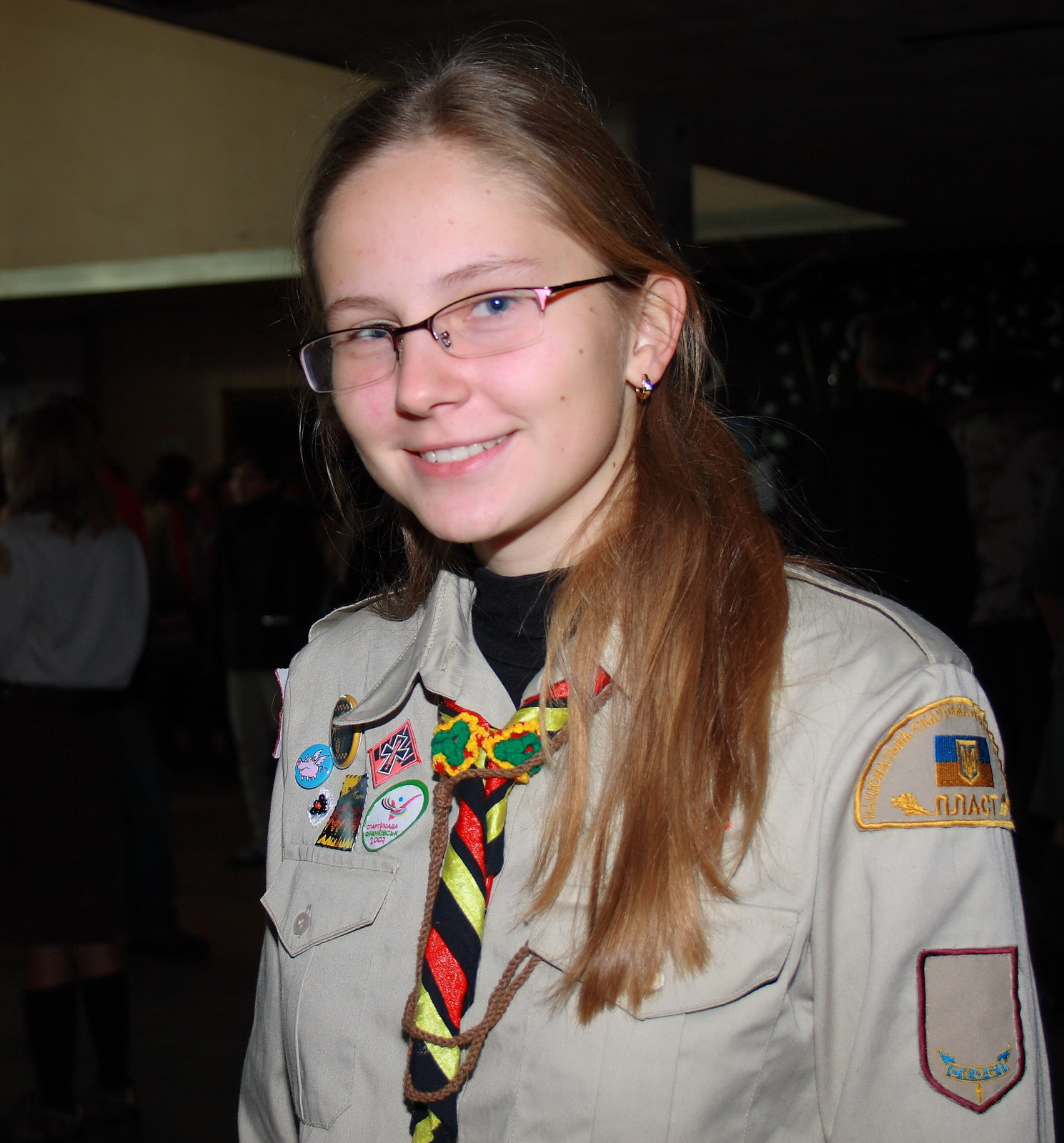
Young woman in plast uniform

When the Soviet Union began to crumble, Scouting appeared clandestinely. The first Plast camp was organized in the summer of 1989 and was raided by the Soviet secret police (KGB); several Scouts were beaten and arrested. Nevertheless, Scouting and Plast persisted.

Since the end of Soviet communism and the birth of an independent Ukraine in 1991, Ukrainian Plast Scouting has been growing rapidly in every corner of the country. This included units in Kyiv, Lutsk and Donetsk. The most active region, however, was in Lviv, where on 22 February 1990, the town council enacted the Statut Plastovoho Tovarystva.

Plast-in-Exile supported the restart of Plast in Ukraine.

At the beginning of 1995, there were 85 local groups and councils, with over 3,500 Scouts.

In August 1997, Plast Ukrainian Scouting celebrated the 85th anniversary since the first Scouting units appeared in Ukraine in 1911, with a Plast Jamboree at the renamed Sokil Plast Museum-Camp, attended by 700 Scouts from 34 units throughout Ukraine. Highlights of this Jamboree included the inauguration the third Nachalniy Plastun (Chief Scout) in Plast's history, and the first ever inaugurated in Ukraine, Lubomyr Romankiw on 10 August 1997; the opening of the Museum at this historic campsite, donated by Metropolitan Andrey Sheptytsky, which had been used by Plast from 1924 to 1944; and the attendance of several Scouts from the First Era of Ukrainian Scouting, including the 93-year-old composer Mykola Kolessa.

In addition, other Scouting groups have been spontaneously appearing, mostly in the eastern and southern parts of Ukraine. Most of them participated, together with Plast, in the Ukrainian delegation to the 18th World Scout Jamboree in the Netherlands in 1995, as well as the First All-Ukrainian Scout Jamboree in Nevytske, and the Second Slavic Jamboree in Prague, Czech Republic.

33 Ukrainian Scouts were invited to take part in the 19th World Scout Jamboree in 1999.

Plast Publishing largely moved back to Ukraine, with financial and editorial support from international units, and publishes a magazine for both younger Scouts, Hotuys (Be Prepared), and for older Scouts Yunak. As with all Plast publications, these monthly publications are written in Ukrainian. They are also distributed internationally.

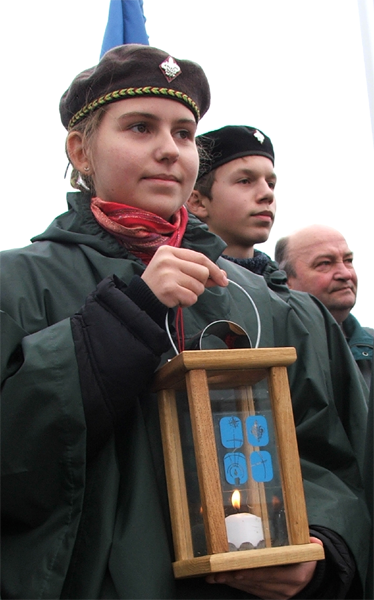
Ukrainian guide (plastunka) from Plast with the Peace Light of Bethlehem, a program inaugurated in 1989, on the Ukrainian-Polish border. Started in 1986 in Austria as part of a charitable relief mission for handicapped children and people in need, it has gone to more than 20 countries in Europe, as well as North America.

As of 2006, Plast had over 10,000 members in Ukraine, and an additional 3,000 members in other countries.

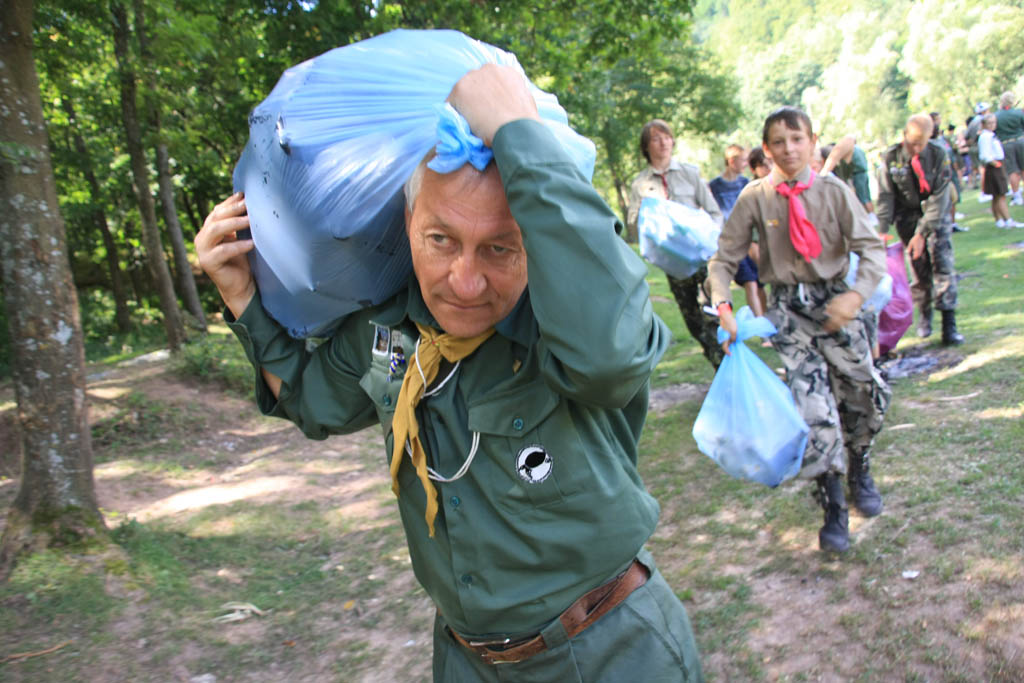
Plastuny are cleaning up the territory during the Second Ukrainian Scout Jamboree, 2009

The 95th anniversary jubilee (Ukrainian: ЮМПЗ, YUMPZ) occurred in August 2007, with a Zustrich at the Plastova Sich campsite in Grafton, Ontario, Canada. Over 1200 yunaky attended the camp, from 4 to 19 August. Tabir Pryhylnyky was at Camp Baturyn, just outside Montreal, Quebec. Tabir Uchasnyky was held in Algonquin Provincial Park, in central Ontario. Tabir Rosviduvachi was held in Samuel de Champlain Park, also in Ontario. Tabir Skobiv and Virlits was in Killarney Park, on Lake Huron, in western Ontario.

=== WOSM recognition ===
Plast is working with the various other Ukrainian Scouting organizations to develop a national Scouting federation and to achieve recognition by the World Organization of the Scout Movement. All duties in Ukrainian Scouting, from local to the National Council levels, are performed by a combination of volunteer workers and paid professionals.

In 2004, the Ukrainian Scout Youth Public Organization Spilka Pionerskykh Orhanizatzii Kyïva (literally Kyiv Pioneer Movement Organization or SPOK, with a membership of 3,750 in 18 of 26 Ukrainian oblasts) applied for WOSM membership. In January 2005, this motion was recommended by the World Scout Bureau. Since more than 5% of the National Scouting Organizations voted against the application, Germany and the Boy Scouts of America among the opposing votes, SPOK was not admitted to WOSM and withdrew the application. As a result of this, a special mission of the World Scout Committee was sent to Ukraine. Ukrainian Scouting endeavored to set up a new Scouting body unifying Plast and SPOK to satisfy WOSM requirements, to be worked out by 2008, as all parties were motivated to join the international community.

Following the recommendations of Resolution 2/05 adopted by the 37th World Scout Conference in Tunisia, the constitutive congress of the National Organization of Scouts of Ukraine (NOSU) was held on 27 March 2007. The congress, which gathered Scout representatives from most regions of Ukraine, approved the Constitution of NOSU and elected its governing bodies. This event was made possible thanks to efforts of three Scout associations (Plast, SPOK and Sich) to work towards unification of Scouting in Ukraine in a new single National Scout Organization so as to be able to join WOSM.

The Constitution of NOSU was officially registered by the Ministry of Justice of Ukraine in November 2007, thus confirming the creation of a single National Scout Organization in Ukraine. An amended version of this Constitution was received on 4 February 2008 and formally approved by the Constitutions Committee and the World Scout Committee.

WOSM Acting Secretary General Luc Panissod visited NOSU in mid-March 2008. He had the opportunity to meet and talk with various groups of young people (candidates to join, patrol leaders, summer camp young leaders) and adult leaders responsible of local Scout groups. He also met with the Deputy Minister of Family, Youth and Sports, one of the founding members of one of the Scout associations, who confirmed full support of the authorities to NOSU. He also had several working sessions with leaders of NOSU to assess the level of development of the organization.

The organization has a loaned headquarters and several campsites. Elements of a progressive scheme include merit badges, which are illustrated in their handbook and are obtained on a progressive basis. At present, NOSU is a small organization and has only one professional staff regularly employed in application of existing legislation. Being a new organization, NOSU still has to develop an efficient working organization.

NOSU membership is open to girls and boys, women and men, in three age sections: Cubs (6–10), Scouts (11–16) and Rovers (16–24). As of 31 December 2007, NOSU comprised 2,475 members including 718 female youth members, 1,546 male youth members, plus some 200 adult leaders and Council members.

NOSU membership is made approximately of 40% from Plast, 40% from SPOK and 20% from Sich. The same percentages are reflected at the National Council level. While double membership still exists (one can be member of NOSU and member of one of the three above associations), direct membership for new members is strongly encouraged. It is the objective of NOSU's leadership that NOSU will be successful enough to attract more members from the three associations who are not yet members of NOSU. Further unification of Scouting through integration of other Scout groups in Ukraine is envisaged through the chartering system.

The Chairman of the National Council is Lev Zakharchishin, the Deputy Chairman of the National Council is Valeriy Tantsiura and the International Commissioner is Andriy Chesnokov. In becoming a member of WOSM, NOSU will become, as it so desires, a member of the Eurasia Scout Region.

== Outside of Ukraine ==
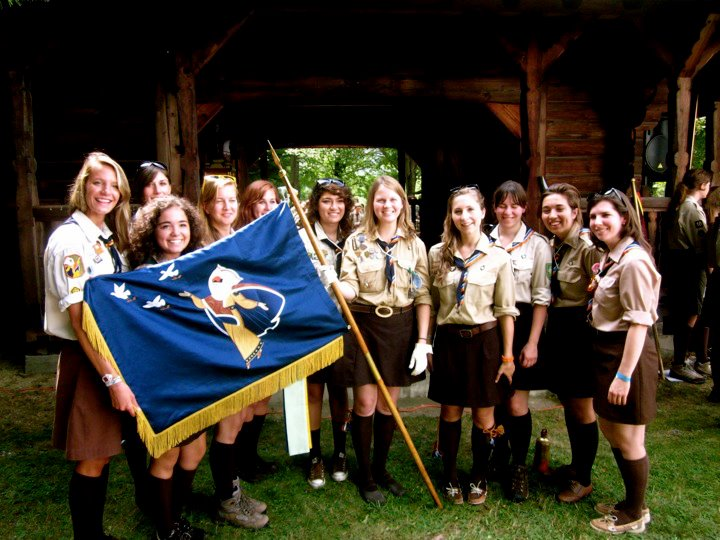
Female plastuns in Philadelphia with their unit's flag

The first scouting organizations of Ukrainian diaspora were founded after 1921 in Czechia. In 1925 a Ukrainian Plast Command was established in Prague, and after the ban of the organization in Polish-ruled areas the main centre of Plast movement was transferred to Czechoslovakia, where it remained active until the Nazi occupation in 1939

After World War II, a number of independent Plast Ukrainian Scouting organizations were founded in the West by Ukrainian emigrants. This era of Plast began in Germany and Austria in 1945 in various Displaced Persons Camps, and as various members of Plast eventually ended up in Canada, the United States, the UK, Australia and elsewhere, various émigré organizations were founded between 1946 and 1951. Until the fall of the Soviet Union, these represented the totality of Plast organizations, and were aligned to a supranational organization called KUPO (Conference of Ukrainian Plast Organizations), which convened every four years and elected an operational "Holovna Plastova Starshyna" (HPB) and a board called "Holovna Plastova Rada" (HPR), and would also name the head Plastun ("Nachalniy Plastun"), typically a long-term or lifetime, and somewhat ceremonial position. The current, and third, "Nachalniy Plastun" is US-based (originally from Edmonton, Alberta, Canada) Lubomyr Romankiw, his predecessor was US-based Yuriy Starosols'kiy, who succeeded Severyn Levytsky ("Siriy Lev"), who was inaugurated in post-World War II Germany.

Following the Russian invasion of Ukraine, Plast branches around the world have experienced a significant influx of members, becoming an important centre of diaspora life. In Sweden the number of people active in the organization has grown from 12 in 2022 to 300 today. A similar situation is being observed in Germany, where the number of Plastuns has reached 180 in Berlin alone. Foreign branches of the Plast are active in the cultural sphere and charity, and gather help for the Ukrainian army and civilians.

== Organization ==
Plast has historically been divided into distinct communities (Ukrainian: улад, plural улади), separated by age and gender of their members:

- Educational Communities (Ukrainian: Виховні Улади) - headed by regional commandants, subject to Chief Plast Bulava:
  - Plast Novices Community (Ukrainian: Улад Пластунів Новаків - male section, Ukrainian: Улад Пластунок Новачок - female section) - involves children aged from 7 to 11 years old, who are organized into swarms (Ukrainian: рої) and nests (Ukrainian: гнізда), headed by tutors known as Cossacks.
  - Plast Youth Community (Ukrainian: Улад Пластунів Юнаків - male section, Ukrainian: Улад Пластунок Юначок - female section) - consists of circles (Ukrainian: гуртки), each involving 6-8 boys of girls aged from 12 to 17 years old; several circles unite into a kurin (Ukrainian: курінь), with both units being headed by the leadership (Ukrainian: провід) elected by their members.
  - Plast Elder Community (Ukrainian: Улад Старших Пластунів - male section, Ukrainian: Улад Старших Пластунок - female section) - consists of voluntary and self-governing circles and kurins involving members aged 18 to 26 years old.
- Ukrainian Plast Seniorate (Ukrainian: Український Пластовий Сеньйорат) - organizes former Plast Elders, divided into territorial or exterritorial ("mother") kurins.

Separate swarms, nests, circles and kurins of the Plast are united into a kish (Ukrainian: кіш, plural коші) based on the territorial principle. Senior and elder Plast members may also unite into regional working groups. Both types of units are in their turn united into Plast stanytsias (Ukrainian: Пластова станиця), headed by elected starshyna. Each stanytsia acts as a regional subdivision of the Plast, possessing its own statute and autonomous in its actions, but subject to the Conference of World Plast Organizations. The latter is headed by Chief Plast Bulava, an executive organ elected every three years along with the Chief Plast Council.

== Ideology ==
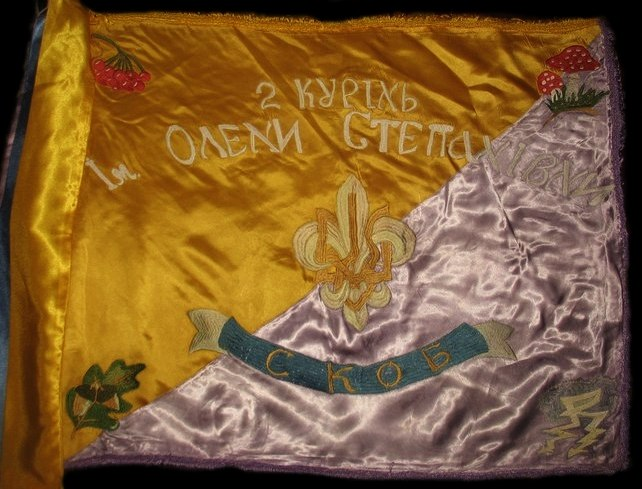
Flag of Olena Stepaniv Plast kurin with the abbreviated greeting S.K.O.B.

Historically, Plast has recognized its main goal to be the patriotic education combined with Ukrainian national traditions, aimed to turn Ukrainian youth into physically and spiritually complete citizens. The ideological base of the Plast movement is contained in the chief elements of the pledge sworn by its newly accepted members: loyalty to God and Ukraine; helping others; following the laws of the organization and obeying the Plast leadership.

According to the Plast law, a plastun (member of the Plast) must be "glorious, conscientious, precise, thrifty, just, polite, brotherly and friendly, balanced, useful, obedient to the Plast leadership, attentive, caring about own health, loving and caring about beauty, well-understanding". The organization promotes the preservation of Ukrainian national identity, and preserves the ideals of service to the Ukrainian people and its struggle for independence. Plast is based on the principles of supra-denominationalism, apoliticality and non-partisanship. At the same time, it supports numerous Ukrainian cultural and civic initiatives, including, among others, the publication of the Encyclopedia of Ukraine.

Many members of the Plast have joined the Ukrainian army to defend the country during the 2022 Russian Invasion of Ukraine. All in all, 80 members of the Plast have fallen on the battlefield since the start of the Russo-Ukrainian War in 2014.

== Traditions ==
The traditional Plast greeting is known under the abbreviation SKOB (Ukrainian: СКОБ), derived from Ukrainian words Сильно, красно, обережно, бистро! ("Strongly, beautifully, carefully, quickly!").

== List of notable members ==
- Stepan Bandera (1909–1959), Ukrainian politician and member of the Organization of Ukrainian Nationalists
- Mykola Bazhan (1904–1983), Ukrainian poet
- Vitaly Derekh (1987–2022), Ukrainian journalist and soldier
- Vera Farmiga (born 1973), American actress
- Sofia Fedak-Melnyk (1901–1990), Ukrainian economist and wife of Andriy Melnyk
- Petro Franko (1890–1941), Ukrainian educator, writing, military leader and politician
- Borys Andrij Gudziak, (born 1960), Metropolitan Archbishop of the Ukrainian Catholic Eparchy of Philadelphia
- Bohdan Hawrylyshyn (1926–2016), Canadian-Swiss-Ukrainian economist and political advisor
- Viktor Hurniak (1987–2014), Ukrainian volunteer soldier and photographer
- Lubomyr Husar (1933–2017), Ukrainian major archbishop
- Natalie Jaresko, (born 1965), Ukrainian-American activist and former Minister of Finance
- Nicholas S. H. Krawciw (1935–2021), American major general
- Boris Lushniak, acting Surgeon General of the United States
- Lubomyr Romankiw (1931-2024), Ukrainian-American IBM Fellow and researcher
- Roman Shukhevych (1907–1950), Ukrainian military leader and nationalist
- Anastasia Stanko (born 1986), Ukrainian journalist
- Heidemarie Stefanyshyn-Piper (born 1963), American naval officer, engineer and astronaut
- Ulana Suprun (born 1963), Ukrainian-American physician, philanthropist, activist and former Minister of Healthcare
- Nadiya Svitlychna (1936–2006), Ukrainian journalist and Soviet dissident
- Katheryn Winnick (born 1977), Canadian actress
- Viktor Yushchenko (born 1954), former President of Ukraine (honorary)

== See also ==
- Fraternities of Plast
- Scouting in Ukraine
- Scouting in displaced persons camps
- Ukrainian Sich Riflemen

=== Archives ===
There is a Plast-Ukrainian Youth Association fonds at Library and Archives Canada. The archival reference number is R5103.
