= Ternopil Ivan Puluj National Technical University =

Public university in Ukraine

- НЗВО «Тернопільський національний технічний університет імені Івана Пулюя»
- Type: National university
- Established: 1960; 66 years ago
- Academic affiliations: Magna Charta Universitatum; Baltic University Programme; European Universities Association
- Rector: Mykola Mytnyk
- Administrative staff: ~500
- Students: ~8200
- Location: Ternopil, Ukraine
- Campus: Urban, 375 acres (1.52 km^{2})
- Affiliations: Ministry of Education and Science of Ukraine
- Website: Official website

University rankings

Regional – Overall
- QS Emerging Europe and Central Asia: 251–300 (2022)

The Ternopil Ivan Pului National Technical University (Ukrainian: Тернопільський національний технічний університет імені Івана Пулюя) is a public university in Ternopil, Ukraine. Ternopil National Technical University (abbr. TNTU) is the leading technical higher educational institution in Western Ukraine, founded in 1960.

Today it is the only higher technical educational institution that provides training of all academic levels, DScs and PhDs for such regions as Ternopil, Chernivtsi, Ivano-Frankivsk, Rivne and Khmelnitsky.

== The history of the university ==
The history of the university is inextricably connected with the history of Ternopil. Since the 1960s the city has developed due to the construction of a significant number of industrial plants, including the Ternopil harvester plant, the VATRA Corporation, later – the plants "The Saturn" and "The Orion". These plants as well as dozens of smaller companies required highly qualified engineers. Lviv Polytechnic was the closest technical university. Thus to ensure this requirement of specialists on 11 November 1960 Ternopil Technical Faculty of the Lviv Polytechnic Institute with the extramural and evening forms of study was opened. This allowed the experienced workers to get higher education without leaving their jobs, and Ternopil gradually transformed into a student city.

The Candidate of technical Sciences, associate professor Stolyarchuk V.P. became the dean of the faculty. Together with twelve university teachers he arrived from Lviv. The faculty was located in the centre of the city in the building of the former women gymnasium named after Adam Mickiewicz. Later new modern buildings grew around this building.

On 3 February 1962 the Candidate of Chemical Sciences, Associate Professor Shcherbakov A.O. was appointed the dean of the faculty. The same year the full-time form of study was organized, that was beneficial both for local youth and for the development of the institution. Due to invitation of new university teachers with academic degrees and titles, development of the material and technical base of the institution and increase of the number of students on 15 May 1964, the faculty was reorganized into the Ternopil branch of the Lviv Polytechnic Institute.

At the same time the new departments of higher mathematics, descriptive geometry and graphics, technical mechanics, physics and energetics were formed. Associate Professor Shcherbakov A.O. became the head of the affiliate. During 1964-1968 new departments were formed. Among them: a department of social and political sciences, a department of theoretical mechanics, a department of foreign languages, a department of technology of metals, a department of machine tools and instruments, a department of physics, a department of general and theoretical electrical engineering, a department of physical education. At this time the institution prepared specialists in such important for our region fields as mechanical engineering, metal cutting tools and instruments, electrical measuring equipment. The first graduates started their work at the industrial plants and some of them joined the teaching stuff of the affiliate.

In March 1968 Polishchuk A.G., Ph.D. became director of the affiliate. It became a new stage in the development of institution. The study rooms and laboratories were equipped with the necessary equipment and machinery, the training areas were expanded, and the affiliates of departments in the production were created. Students had an opportunity to choose evening, full-time or extramural form of study. In the 70's – 80's the first scientific schools were established. The scientists of the affiliate executed scientific research and experimental development projects for the enterprises of not only Ternopil and Ukraine, but also the former Soviet Union (Moscow, Kaunas, Urengoy, etc.).

In October 1985, Doctor of Sciences, Professor Shabliy O.M was appointed the director of the Ternopil branch of the Lviv Polytechnic Institute. New specialties were opened: welding technology and equipment, automation of technological processes and production, instrumentation, biotechnical and medical devices and systems.

In the late 1980s and early 1990s, scholars from Kyiv, Lviv, Moscow, Mogilev, Doctors of Technical Sciences, Professors Yasniy P.V., Rybak T.I., Molchanov A.D., Maziak Z.Yu., Yevtuh P.S., Candidates of Science., Associate Professors Tataryn B.P, Mastenko V.Yu., Yavorskyi B.I., Tkachuk R.A., Yukalo V.H. started their work at the university. They initiated new scientific directions of research, created research laboratories, became the heads of the newly established departments, and carried out significant work to open new specialties.

At that time, the first doctoral theses were defended by Hevko B.M., Nahorniak S.H., Rohatynskyi R.M., Didukh L.D., Stuhliak P.D.

Due to the active and effective work of the head and stuff of the institution on 27 February 1991, the Ternopil Instrument-Making Institute was founded on the basis of the Ternopil affiliate of the Lviv Polytechnic Institute. It was the second higher educational institution of such a direction in Ukraine. Professor Shablii O.M. was elected the first rector of the institute. At that time the institute comprised 3 faculties, integrating 13 departments. 2420 students studied at the institute. 150 teachers worked at the institute, including 76 Doctors and Candidates of sciences. A new laboratory was built, for the connection of the training with production the buildings at the enterprises "Vatra", Ternopil harvester-building, "Saturn" were bought. The foundation of the current sport complex "Polytechnic" was laid.

Since April 1995, the university bears the name of the famous Ukrainian scientist and public figure Ivan Puluj. In 1994 the institute was accredited as IV level educational institution.

The creation of the Institute gave a powerful impetus to the new quality changes and further growth. The restructuring of the economy of the region and the necessity of providing staff for overcoming the crisis helped change the orientation of the Institute and carry out its considerable structural reconstruction. The institute has practically lost its narrow applied line gradually transforming into the multibranch higher technical educational institution.

Considering the real developments and achievements of the teaching staff, the Regulation of the Cabinet of Ministers of Ukraine No. 1536 from 30 December 1996 approved the creation of Ternopil Ivan Puluj State Technical University on the basis of Ternopil Instrument-Making Institute. Academician Shablii O.M. became the rector of the university.

New specialisms of (computer, electrical, food and economic directions) were launched at the university. 8 faculties were functioning within the university: Faculty of Computer Technologies, Faculty of Computer Information Systems and Software Engineering, Faculty of Electrical Engineering, Faculty of Food Processing Production, Faculty of Mechanical Engineering, Faculty of Economics and Entrepreneurship, Faculty of Management and Business in Production, Faculty of Testing Instruments and Radio Computer Systems.

The 36 departments of the university trained bachelors, specialists and masters in 19 majors of basic and 22 majors of full higher education.

Since 1999 the university has been a full member of the European University Association – an organization represents and supports more than 850 institutions of higher education in 47 countries, providing them with a forum for cooperation and exchange of information on higher education and research policies. Through its work and contacts with the European Commission, Parliament and other key decision-makers, EUA ensures universities’ interests and concerns are taken up with all key stakeholders. The university takes active part in fulfilling one of the main tasks of the association which is the creation of the European higher education space where students, teachers and scientists would be able to accomplish their own intentions and ideas on the basis of the established European educational norms.

On 16 September 2005 Ternopil Ivan Puluj State Technical University joined the European Declaration of the higher educational institutions of the Magna Charta Universitatum comprising fundamental principles, rights and duties of the universities as the outposts of culture, knowledge and research and uniting 816 Universities from 86 Countries.

In the same year under the guidance of Sc.D, Professor Yasniy P.V. the first regional academy CISCO and Institute of Entrepreneurship, that train specialists in the field of computer networks were created. After graduation graduates receive an internationally recognized certificate.

In 2003, the largest in the region sports and health, and social and cultural center "Polytechnic" was put into operation.

On 16 March 2007, Sc.D., Professor Merited Figure of Science and Technology of Ukraine Yasniy P.V. was elected the rector of the TSTU.

The Strategy and Concept of University Development up to 2020 have been developed and implemented. One of the main tasks of the university development concept are integration into the European scientific and educational space through organizational and structural reform, improving the quality of education, developing university autonomy, mobility of university teachers, scholars, postgraduates and students.

On 11 December 2009, with the decree of the President of Ukraine for a significant contribution to the development of national education and science, and taking into account the national and international recognition of the results of higher education, the university was granted a national status.

In 2007 the center for training of foreign students was opened, and later, in 2011, it developed into the Foreign Students Faculty. Today more than 250 foreigners study at the preparatory department and take bachelor's and master's degree in Ukrainian and English. In 2007–2008, joint faculties were established with Shobhit University (New Delhi, India), with the Technological University of Tajikistan (Dushanbe, Republic of Tajikistan). In 2011, the first in Tajikistan local center of distance education was opened in Dushanbe. In 2012, the local center of distance education was created at the Ukrainian Cultural Center in Detroit, Michigan (USA), and in June 2014, the graduate, who undertook his program defended his bachelor's thesis.

In 2009, students and teaching staff from the private Institute of Economics and Entrepreneurship joined the university. Thus new economic specialties – accounting and auditing, and finance and credit were opened.

The 2009–2010 academic year was marked by two remarkable events in the history of the university – the 165th birthday of Ivan Puluj and the 50th anniversary of the foundation of the institution. During the celebration of the anniversary of the university a presentation of a commemorative coin dedicated to Ivan Puluj was presented. The National Bank of Ukraine, continuing the series "Prominent People of Ukraine" introduced the coin on the occasion of the commemoration of the 165th anniversary of the birth of an outstanding scientist.

The reverse of the coin depicts a portrait of Ivan Puluj and his statement: "… There is no greater a respect for an intelligent man than to protect his national honor and to work faithfully without a reward for the good of his people in order to give them a better life".

At the same time, Ivan Puluj museum was opened. Today many people visit it to become acquainted with the history of the university.

Since 2010, the Program of cooperation between the university, the Western Scientific Center of the National Academy of Science of Ukraine and the Ministry of Education and Science of Ukraine, the Ternopil Regional State Administration and the Ternopil Regional Council is being implemented, and since 2011 the university's Cooperation Program with the Ternopil City Council has been put into action.

In 2011, at the initiative of the university, the Scientific Park "Innovation and investment cluster of Ternopil region" (director – Khymych H.P.) was created as a platform for wide activization of innovation activity in the Western Ukraine in the field of ecology, energy saving and information technologies.

During 2011–2015, the project proposals for the feasibility study for the City and Regional councils were developed within the framework of the City and Region Development Strategy (logistical hub based on Ternopil airport; digital Ternopil; hydropower of Ternopil region; automated energy accounting system for housing and communal services; investigation of Ternopil's transport and communications infrastructure, etc.). For the Ministry of Defense of Ukraine satellite monitoring systems were developed.

A university library is important cultural and informational center of the university. It plays an important role in the educational process. The university electronic library expands the possibilities of using electronic resources. Since the beginning of 2010, a trial access to the economics and law database "Polpred Database!" It's a depository of important publications manually collected. Database with subject heading list: 53 branches / 600 sources / 235 countries and territories / main materials / articles and interviews of 16000 chief executives. In 2011, access to the electronic books of the Center of Educational Literature and the largest publisher of the scientific journals EBSCO-Publishing in the world was opened. Since 2011, the reading room of the library has been providing the opportunity to work with literature and use the Internet in the WI-FI zone.

In 2012, the University Library became the member of the International Association of Scientific and Technological University Libraries (IATUL). The library website provides users access to up-to-date library information about the work of the library.

In 2012, the title of Honorary Doctor of TNTU (Doctor Honoris Causa) for the prominent scientists, that closely cooperate with the university was introduced. According to the decision of the Academic Council for the significant contribution to the development of science and education in Ukraine and fruitful cooperation with the university, this honorary title was given to the leading scientist of the Institute of Physics of the National Academy of Sciences of Ukraine, Sc.D., Professor Shenderovskyi Vasyl Andriyovych (2012), well-known Ukrainian, Canadian and Swiss economist, public figure, philanthropist Bohdan Hawrylyshyn (2013), world-renowned physicists, scientist, academician of the French Academy of Sciences, Chevalier of the Order of the Legion of Honour, Professor of Pierre and Marie Curie University Jacques Fresaro (France) (2014) and Professor Piotr Kacejko, Rector of Lublin University of Technology (2014).

== The structure ==
The range of specialties taught at the affiliate, institute and, finally, university has gradually extended, and presently the amount of specialties for bachelors, specialists and masters reaches the number of 28. Altogether they are united in 19 directions.

There are 4 faculties currently operating at the university: Faculty of Engineering of Machines, Structures and Technologies (FMT), Faculty of Applied Information Technologies and Electrical Engineering (FPT), Faculty of Computer Information Systems and Software Engineering (FIS), Faculty of Economics and Management (FEM). The 34 University departments carry out training of bachelors, specialists and masters in 28 programs and 19 majors. The annual licensed admission number of full-time students amounts to 3088 people.

University also incorporates such establishments as Technical Lyceum, Technical College, Husiatin College, and Zboriv College. This adds up to a total of approximately 5000 undergraduates, masters and PhD students who are all working towards higher-degree qualifications at the university.

Technical and structural asset base of Ternopil Ivan Puluj National Technical University consists of 11 educational and research buildings with a total area of almost 60 thousand square meters. There are 6 dormitories, a number of gyms, student cafeterias and buffets, as well as rooms for creative development and art activities.

Since 2012, students have participated in Double Degree Programs. All the university students have the opportunity to participate in the academic mobility programmes in Poland, Germany, the UK, France and the USA. Currently, 30 students study under Double master's degree Programme at the Lublin University of Technology (Poland), one student studies at the Opole University of Technology, and two students study under Ukrainian-German Double Degree Programme for the bachelor's degree at the University of Applied Sciences Schmalkalden (Germany). Moreover, the university students studied at Glyndŵr University (Wrexham, Wales, UK). One postgraduate student undertook training and two students studied for their master's degree at the International Higher School of Computer Science and Information Technology (Cergy, France). The academic mobility programme «Polish Erasmus for Ukraine and Erasmus +» was implemented at TNTU. 14 university students study at 7 Polish universities under this programme

International educational centres, including: Regional Networking Academy CISCO (USA, 1999); Certification Centre VUE (2000); Regional Training Centre Schneider ЕІесtrіс (France, 2000); Microsoft IT Academy (USA, 2002); Authorized training centre ASCON (Russia, 2002); Training Centre QNX Software Systems (Canada, 2003); Training Center SUN Microsystems (USA, 2004); IBM Training Center (USA, 2006); University program STMicroelectronix (Switzerland, 2007); Business Institute СІSСО (USA, 2008); Authorized Training Centre of D-Link Company (Taiwan, 2010), Training centre C++ (2014). Program "Apollo" (Germany, 2010), the association "German Farmers’ Association" (Germany), "Agroimpuls" (Switzerland) conduct training for TNTU students.

== Faculties ==
Faculty of Engineering of Machines, Structures and Technologies

131 Mechanical engineering
133 Industrial Machinery Engineering
181 Food Industry Technologies
192 Civil Engineering
208 Agricultural engineering
274 Automobile Transport
275 Transport Technologies (Automobile Transport)

Faculty of Applied Information Technologies and Electrical Engineering

141 Electrical Engineering
151 Automation and Computer-integrated Technologies
152 Metrology and Information-Measuring Engineering
153 Micro- and nano-system technology
163 Biomedical Engineering
172 Telecommunications and Radio Engineering

Faculty of Computer Information Systems and Software Engineering

121 Software Engineering
122 Computer Sciences
123 Computer Engineering
124 System Analysis
125 Cyber Security
126 Information System and Technologies

Faculty of Economics and Management

051 Economics
053 Psychology
071 Accounting and Taxation
072 Finances, Banking and Insurance
073 Management
074 Public Administration
075 Marketing
076 Business, Trade and Exchange
241 Hotel, Restaurant and Catering
281 Public administration

== Teaching staff ==
Teaching staff is represented by 433 teachers; there are 15 Academicians and Corresponding Members of the Academies of Sciences of Ukraine, 52 Doctors of Science, Professors and 250 Doctors of Philosophy, Associate Professors.

== See also ==
List of universities in Ukraine
