= Bohdan Hawrylyshyn =

Ukrainian economist (1926–2016)

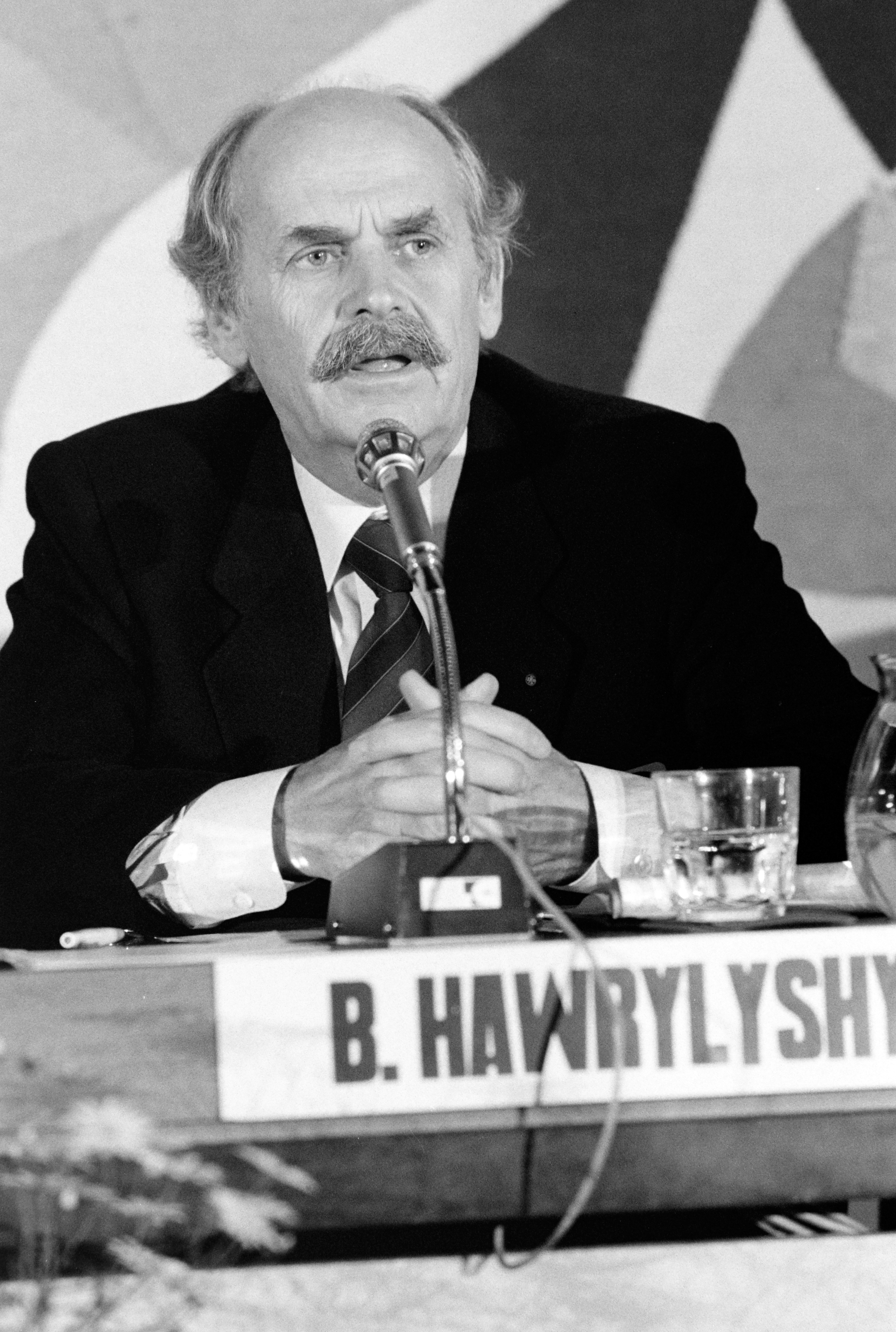
Hawrylyshyn in 1987

Bohdan Dmytrovych Hawrylyshyn (Ukrainian: Богдан Дмитрович Гаврилишин; 19 October 1926 – 24 October 2016) was a Ukrainian, Canadian, and Swiss economist, thinker, benefactor, and advisor to governments and large companies worldwide. He was a full member of the Club of Rome, a long-time director of Switzerland's International Management Institute (now International Institute for Management Development), a founder of the European Management Forum in Davos (now World Economic Forum), a fellow and member of the Board of the World Academy of Art and Science. Hawrylyshyn also was a consultant of General Electric, IBM, Unilever, Philips and advisor to several countries. After Ukraine declared independence in 1991, he was an advisor to several Ukrainian prime ministers, and to most chairmen of the Ukrainian Verkhovna Rada.

Hawrylyshyn was awarded five honorary doctorates, a gold medal from the President of the Italian Republic, and two medals from presidents of Ukraine. From 1988 he worked mainly in Ukraine, and created the International Management Institute which he chaired. He also chaired the International Centre for Political Studies, initiated the creation of a number of student organizations, acted as an advisor to the first President of Ukraine Leonid Kravchuk, (and also advised) four successive chairmen of Parliament and three prime ministers. At the end of his life, Hawrylyshyn focused on youth organizations through the Bohdan Hawrylyshyn Charitable Foundation.

Hawrylyshyn was also an active member of the Lisovi Chorty fraternity within the Plast Ukrainian Scouting Organization. From 2006 to 2008, Hawrylyshyn was the Headman of Plast.

In 1980 his report to the Club of Rome was published:

- Bohdan Hawrylyshyn, (1980) Road Maps to the Future — Towards more effective societies, Elmsford, New York: Pergamon Press.
- Bohdan Hawrylyshyn, (2016) Identity in a Globalized World, Old Lion Publishing House.

== Biography ==
Bohdan Hawrylysyn was born in Koropets village, Ternopil Oblast where he spent most of his childhood on his father's farm. During World War II, he was captured by the Nazis in 1944 and displaced to Germany. After the war, he spent almost two years in a displaced person's camp, and afterwards moved to Canada as a lumberjack. While working at various jobs, Hawrylyshyn was admitted to the University of Toronto. His admission received media coverage and public disruption, as he was the first refugee to get admitted to a university in Canada. In 1952 he graduated with a BA and an MA in 1954 in engineering at the University of Toronto. From 1954 to 1960 Hawrylysyn worked as an engineer, researcher and manager at various enterprises in Canada.

Hawrylysyn died on 24 October 2016 at the age of 90 in Kyiv, Ukraine.

=== Professional career ===
In 1960, Hawrylyshyn started his career in the educational sphere. For eight years he had been supervising training programs at IMI Geneva (now International Institute for Management Development), teaching economics, global business environment, international operations management and public administration. In 1968, Hawrylyshyn became the Director of the institute and remained its head for eighteen years. During his tenure at the Institute, Hawrylyshyn brought up a great number of top professionals for hundreds of companies all over the world.

At the same time, Hawrylyshyn carried out research work and fruitful public activities. In 1972 he was elected to the Club of Rome, in 1973 – to the International Management Academy, in 1975 – the World Academy of Art and Science. In 1976, Hawrylyshyn was awarded Doctorate of Economics of University of Geneva, Honorary Doctorate of Law of University of York (Canada) in 1984 and University of Alberta (Canada) in 1986. Later, Doctor Hawrylyshyn received an award of the Engineering Hall of Distinction of University of Toronto (Canada). Hawrylyshyn was a high-profile expert on issues of public administration and international business and cross-cultural relations, and was a contributor, moderator and chairperson at international conferences and seminars in over 70 countries.

Published papers of the scientist include more than 100 articles in management, managerial education, economic and political environment. He was the author of two books; one of these “Road Maps to the Future - Towards More Effective Societies” won international recognition and has been published in nine languages.

=== Contribution to the development of Ukraine ===
From 1988, Hawrylyshyn committed his activity to Ukraine. He initiated the establishment of the International Management Institute (MIM-Kyiv) by the Academy of Sciences of Ukraine and IMI-Geneva; it was the first institution in the former USSR which provided MBA program training.

In 1989, with Dr. Hawrylyshyn's active participation and organizational assistance, an international charity "Vidrodzhennya" fund was set up in Kyiv; the institution is financed by George Soros. From the beginning of the fund activity to 1998, Hawrylyshyn was the head of the Supervisory Board of this public organization, the purpose of which is to develop the foundation of civil society in cultural, educational, scientific and social spheres.

In 1991, Dr. Hawrylyshyn created and became the head of the Council of Advisors to the Presidium of the Ukrainian Parliament that worked for seven years, was a member of the American-Ukrainian advisory board, an advisor to the first president of Ukraine, four chairmen of the Verkhovna Rada and three prime-ministers. Until his death, he was a board member of the World Academy of Art and Science, the head of the National Organization of Scouts of Ukraine, a member of the executive committee of the Swiss International Policy Forum, the head of Supervisory Board of MIM-Kyiv. He also facilitated the establishment of the International Centre for Policy Studies and remained the head of its Supervisory Board up to 2006. In Ukraine, the fruitful activities of Dr. Hawrylyshyn are highly appreciated by a broad community of education, science and state officials. He was elected a foreign member of the National Academy of Sciences of Ukraine and was awarded an Order of Merit. He is a merited scientist of Ukraine, was an advisor to the Chairman of the Verkhovna Rada, and held honorary doctorates from Ternopil Economic Academy, Stefanyk University in Ivano-Frankivsk and Fedkovych University in Chernivtsi.

== Charitable work ==
In 2010, Dr. Hawrylyshyn founded Bogdan Hawrylyshyn Charitable Foundation, the main purpose of which is to encourage and promote new generations of professional, patriotic Ukrainians who care about common values and goods, who are proactive in the social and political life of the country and who can cooperate with each other. Dr. Hawrylyshyn believed that these young Ukrainians would form a critical mass of people capable of transforming Ukraine. The endowment of the Foundation consists of private funds and Hawrylyshyn himself.

The key program of the Foundation is called Young Generation Will Change Ukraine and is created in the form of an international study-trip. According to it the selected groups of young people choose one of the effective European countries, i.e. Austria, Germany, Norway, Sweden, Switzerland or Poland, study their experience, make a short study trip to the country in question, then select "components" for political, economic, social "architecture" for the future Ukraine and use that knowledge in their political or civil careers for transformation of Ukraine. The results of the studies will be presented in mass media and at different events and also will be submitted to the legislative process including drafting and amending national laws.

The groups usually focus their research work on different issues, including the parliamentary system, social policy of the country, environmental policy, gender policy, mass media, and the role young people play in the government of the country and in the public sector.

== Distinctions ==
- Antonovych prize (1991)
- Gold Medal of the President of the Italian Republic (1975)
- Engineering Hall of Fame, University of Toronto, Canada (1988)
- Medal of Merit of the President of Ukraine (1996)
- Medal by the President of Ukraine "Yaroslav the Wise", 1st Category (2005)
- Medal of Saint Nicholas by the Ukrainian Orthodox Church of Kyiv Patriarchy (2016)
- Medal of Liberty by the President of Ukraine (2016)

== Honorary Degrees of Doctor of Laws ==
- York University, Toronto, Canada (1984)
- University of Alberta, Edmonton, Canada (1986)
- Ternopil Academy of National Economy, Ukraine (1995)
- University of V. Stefanyk, Ivano-Frankivsk, Ukraine (1998)
- University of Y. Fedkovych, Chernivtsi, Ukraine (2000)
- Borys Grinchenko Kyiv University (2012)
- Diplomatic Academy of Ukraine (2014)
