= National Organization of the Scouts of Ukraine =

National Scout organization in Ukraine

National Organization “Scouts of Ukraine”
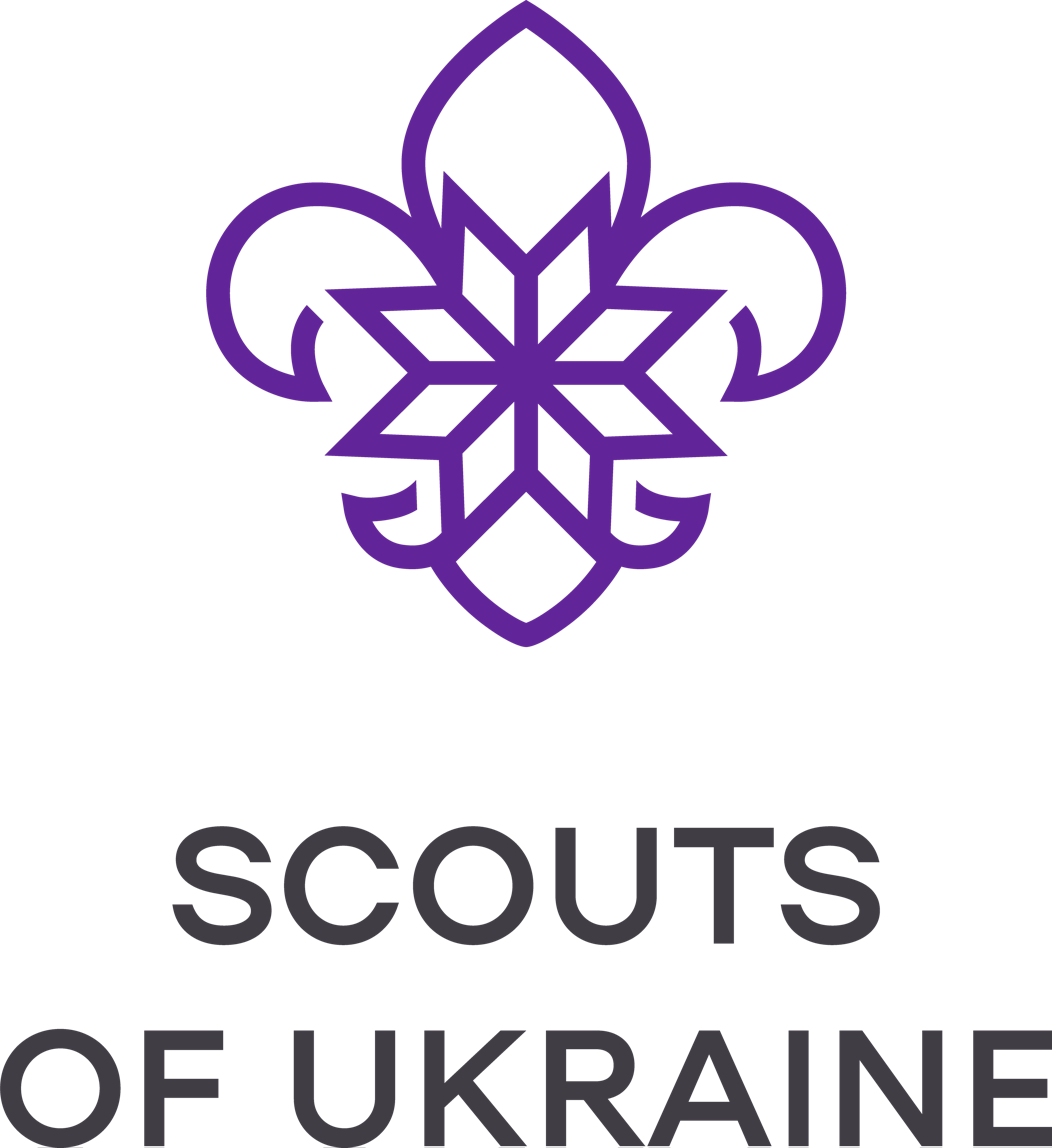
- Національна організація Скаутів України
- Headquarters: Kyiv
- Country: Ukraine
- Founded: 27 March 2007
- Membership: 4,650
- Chief Scout: Alina Chernyshova
- Affiliation: World Organization of the Scout Movement
- Website http://www.ukrscout.org/

The National Organization of the Scouts of Ukraine (Ukrainian: Національна організація скаутів України, Natsionalna orhanizatsiya skautiv Ukrayiny, NOSU) is a Ukrainian non-governmental organization founded in 2007. It represents Ukraine in the World Organization of the Scout Movement (WOSM) and was registered by the Ministry of Justice of Ukraine by Order №987/5 on 26 October 2007.

NOSU's mission is to promote the development of Ukrainian youth through the value system based on the Scout Promise and the Scout Law.

In 2008, during the 38th World Scout Conference in Korea, the National Organization of the Scouts of Ukraine (NOSU) became a member of the WOSM and is thus its only official representative in Ukraine.

The purpose of the organization is to promote development of the Scout movement in Ukraine by ensuring unity and understanding of its designation, principles and method, expanding its activities and development, and preserving its special educational specificity.

The organization's task is to create favorable conditions for the development of children and youth as individuals and responsible citizens of Ukraine, and the fullest disclosure of their physical, emotional, intellectual, social and spiritual potential.

According to Art. 8 of the Law of Ukraine "On Public Associations", citizens of Ukraine, as well as foreigners and stateless persons who are legally in Ukraine, regardless of race, gender, ethnicity, social origin, religion, property status and language of communication and who follow the purpose of Scouting, Scout Principles and the Scout Method, may become members of the organization.

== History ==
=== Earlier scouting movement in Ukraine ===
From 1895 to 1900, a secret youth organization existed at the Kamianets-Podilskyi Bursa, called the Zaporoz’ka Sich ("Zaporozhian Sich"). It paid considerable attention to the physical improvement of its members. It did not engage in military activities, although its units were differently armed. Members carried wooden "weapons". All the local members wore the names of famous historical figures. Every division had its tents made of branches, straw and corn stalks. Every member wore a twig of a plant, issued to his division — it could be oak, birch, viburnum, sycamore etc. The organizer of the Zaporoz’ka Sich was an older student, Borys Sulkovsky. It is known that in 1909 a Ukrainian young man, Yurko Honchariv-Honcharenko, founded the First Scout Squad in Ukraine in the Bakhmut district of Katerynoslav region.

From 1909 to 1911 Oleksandr Tysovsky from Lviv translated and published the book Scouting for Boys by the founder of the Scout movement Baden-Powell. Oleksandr was one of the founders of the first Plast scout groups at the Academic Gymnasium in Lviv. Independently from Tysovsky, Ivan Chmola and Petro Franko started their own Plast groups. While the latter focused the principles of Plast on physical and military training, Oleksandr Tysovsky was engaged in theoretical education of young people. He developed a system of Plast trials (tasks) that Plast members had to complete in order to obtain new ranks and improve themselves. After a few months of their activity, on 12 April 1912, about 40 people passed the first "participant" trial and took the Plast oath of allegiance to God and Ukraine. This is considered to be the official date of the foundation of Plast.

In the Russian Empire the scouting movement started to develop around 1909. From 1911 to 1914 in Kyiv doctor Anokhin was running a scout group. It consisted of young boys-students and scientists who took a walk around the outskirts of Kyiv every week. After the walk, the group stopped somewhere cozy and built a fire. In the light of the fire, the doctor used to talk about Ernest Seton-Thompson and his organization. After 1914 Anokhin cooperated with the Kyiv Educational District, issuing the book "Companion of a Young Scout" (1915). After the Revolution of 1917 the scouting movement started attaining more national forms, and Ukrainian boy scout squads were established in Bila Tserkva, Kaniv, Kyiv, Katerynoslav, Vinnytsia and other cities. After the establishment of the Soviet regime those scouting groups were liquidated and replaced with so-called "Yuks" ("Young Communist Scouts"). However, the latter were disbanded according to a decree of the Komsomol in 1920 due to their refusal to involve political ideology in education of the youth. The place of scouts in the Soviet Union was eventually taken by the Young Pioneer movement.

=== Revival of Ukrainian scouting ===
The revival of the Scout movement in Ukraine started when Ukraine gained its independence, after 50 to 70 years of prohibition. Every region has its own history of Scouting revival and founding of its scouting groups and organizations. Every group wanted to come together to become a member of the World Organization of the Scout Movement because there can only be one organization representing a country in WOSM.

WOSM supported the revival of Scouting in Ukraine, and on their initiative, the National Scout Organization of France became the main partner of this process.

Thus, in 2007, on the basis of the Values of World Scouting, the all-Ukrainian youth organization National Organization of Scouts of Ukraine was established, with active representatives from three scout organizations in Ukraine: All-Ukrainian Youth Organization «Plast — National Scout Organization of Ukraine», All-Ukrainian Youth Organization «SPOK» and an All-Ukrainian Organization Sich (Січ, meaning "Cossack fortress").

=== Recent history ===
The National Organization “Scouts of Ukraine” was founded in 2007. The first governing body of the Organization is the National Board of Organization, consisting of 18 people. Head of the National Board of NOSU was Lev Zakharchyshyn and his deputy was Valeriy Tantsiura.

In 2008, NOSU applied to join the WOSM. The request was considered and on July 1, 2008, at the 38th World Scout Conference in Korea, NOSU was officially accepted into the World Organization of the Scout Movement. The Second General Assembly of NOSU took place on June 4, 2011, where a new composition of the National Board was elected. Victor Bocharnikov was Head of National Board, Andriy Chesnokov was first deputy and Mykola Muzala was deputy.

The celebration of the 100th anniversary of the Ukrainian scouting movement at the state level was first mentioned in Presidential Decree No. 279/2008 "On measures to promote the development of the Plast (Scouting) movement in Ukraine" of March 28, 2008.

On November 1, 2011, the Parliament of Ukraine (Verkhovna Rada) adopted the Resolution "On the Celebration of 100th Anniversary of Ukrainian Scout Movement", initialized by NOSU.

The Parliament of Ukraine pointed out the need to hold a series of events dedicated to the 100th anniversary in different regions of Ukraine and to support this anniversary date at the state level, as the scouting movement is very developed and is rightfully considered the biggest youth movement in Ukraine.

On November 7, 2011, Ukraine became the 23rd member of DESMOS, the International Link of Orthodox Christian Scouts. On March 22-25, 2012, Ukraine held a meeting of the DESMOS committee for the first time in the Eurasian region of WOSM. DESMOS is an independent network of Scouts of the Orthodox Christian faith belonging to national member organizations of the World Organization of the Scout Movement. The process of joining other religious networks of the WOSM is currently ongoing.

On May 19, 2013, the third reporting and election Assembly of the National Organization of Scouts of Ukraine took place, during which a new National Board, Head of Organization and National Secretary were elected. Maksym Hromov was elected as Head of the Board; members of the National Board are Andriy Chesnokov, Mykola Muzala, Yevhen Semenkov, Father Andriy Kliushev, Yaroslava Kolobova, Olena Halushka, Oleksiy Nikolaiev, Iryna Yermak, Natalia Miroshnychenko, Alina Gurin. NOSU's National Secretary is Svitlana Sapiha.

On May 18, 2014, the lV extraordinary Assembly of the National Organization of Scouts of Ukraine was held in Kyiv. The main issues that were considered at this Assembly were the election of a new composition and Head of the National Board of NOSU, members of the Audit Commission.

The Assembly decided to elect a new National Board for a two-year term, which included representatives of Donetsk, Zaporizhia, Lviv, Mykolaiv regional branches and the Kyiv city branch of NOSU. The Audit Commission includes scouts from Donetsk, Kyiv, Lviv, Mykolaiv regions and the city of Sevastopol.

Andriy Chesnokov was elected Head of the National Board of NOSU. Natalia Miroshnychenko was appointed National Secretary of NOSU. In 2014, NOSU was admitted to the ICCS (International Conference of Catholic Scouts) as an observer member. Father Michal (a member of the Odesa regional branch of NOSU since 2009, a Catholic priest of the Don Bosco Foundation) was elected as the head of the Catholic Commission of NOSU.

On June 4–5, 2016, the V Assembly of the National Organization of Scouts of Ukraine was held, during which many strategically important documents and the National Youth Program were approved, and a new composition of the National Council was elected for the period of the next three years. Valeriy Tantsiura was elected Head of the National Board of NOSU, and Volodymyr Izvarin was elected Deputy Head. Nika Gorovska was appointed International Commissioner. Natalia Miroshnychenko was re-elected as the National Secretary of NOSU.

On October 5–6, 2019, the Vl Assembly of the National Organization of Scouts of Ukraine took place. The main issues that were considered at this Assembly were the election of a new board. Volodymyr Izvarin was elected Head of the National Council of NOSU.

In August 2021 for the first time in the history of Ukrainian Scouting, a member of the National Organization “Scouts of Ukraine” Nika Gorovska became a member of the World Scout Committee of WOSM.

From July 1st to September 2023, NOSU was a part of the Eurasia Scout Region of WOSM.

On October 1, 2023, NOSU was moved to the European region of WOSM. It was a major event for Ukraine and Ukrainian Scouting, offering new opportunities for integrating members of the Organization into European Scouting.

On May 18, 2024, the VII Assembly of Members of the National Organization of Scouts of Ukraine was held in Kyiv. The Assembly adopted the new name of the Organization — "National Organization "Scouts of Ukraine" (NOSU) and established the National Office of the Organization. Corresponding changes were made to the Constitution. Alina Chernyshova was elected Head of the National Board of NOSU.

== Structure ==
Youth in Scouting can get a membership in NOSU by forming small groups of 5 to 8 people, which create Scout formations according to the age section. The work of this formation is coordinated by a team of adult leaders, one to three volunteers who have completed the training process and received NOSU certification. During the Formation Assembly young people alongside their leaders elect their governing bodies, which allows them to gain experience in democratic governance.

Scout Associations should include at least 2 Scout groups. The governing body of a Scout Association is the Scout Committee.

The supreme governing body of the organization is the Assembly, which takes place every three years. The governing body of the organization between assemblies is the National Board of Scouts of Ukraine, which implements the strategic objectives approved by the Assembly and carries out the operational management of the organization.

== Youth Programme ==
The Youth Programme is an informal education program that harmoniously complements the formal education system. Through the partnership, children youth can acquire knowledge, form values, life competencies that are important for their personal development and active participation in society.

The goal is to develop the following qualities:

Independence — to be able to make a choice and to control their own life and the life of their society, as an individual and a citizen.

Empathy — to be able to show care about others, to interact with them and for them, to put yourself in their shoes.

Responsibility — to be able to take responsibility for your actions, to fulfill promises and to honor obligations.

Confidence and loyalty — to be able to stand up for your values, ideals, goals and to act according to them.

Acceptance — to be able to respect views of other people according to their traditions, ethnicity, religion, language or culture.

Freedom — to be able to quickly choose a goal and means of getting to it, overcome fear and confusion (taking the risks into account), to complete the work as well as to achieve your goals, be persistent and confident.

The educational approach, embedded in the Youth Programme, is based on practice. It is realized through attractive and conscious activities that meet the interests of young people and is realized through certain complementary conditions, such as outdoor life and volunteer service.

== Scout Method ==
The Scout Method is the base of the Youth Programme. The Scout Method is a system of progressive self-development.

It consists of eight interrelated components:

1. The Scout Promise and Law: a personal voluntary commitment to a set of shared values, which is the foundation of everything a Scout does and a Scout wants to be. The Promise and Law are central to the Scout Method.

2. Learning by doing — the use of practical actions (real life experiences) and reflection(s) to facilitate ongoing learning and development.

3. Team system — the use of small teams as a way to participate in collaborative learning, with the aim of developing effective team work, interpersonal skills, leadership as well as building a sense of responsibility and belonging.

4. Community involvement — active exploration and commitment to communities and the wider world, fostering greater appreciation and understanding between people.

5. Symbolic Framework — a unifying structure of themes and symbols to facilitate learning and the development of a unique identity as a Scout.

6. Adult support — adults facilitating and supporting young people to create learning opportunities.

7. Personal progression — a progressive learning journey focused on motivating and challenging an individual to continually develop, through a wide variety of learning opportunities.

8. Nature — learning opportunities in the outdoors which encourage a better understanding of and a relationship with the wider environment.

== Principles of the Scout movement ==
Since its inception, the Scouting Movement has been based on a system of values (interdependent ethical rules). The principles of Scouting, or the values they symbolize, naturally fall into three categories:

Duty to God

Adherence to spiritual principles, loyalty to the religion that expresses them, and acceptance of the duties resulting therefrom. An important aspect of this Scouting principle is a person's relationship with the spiritual values of life and their fundamental belief in a higher power. Fulfill your religious responsibilities and respect the rights of those whose beliefs differ from your own.

Duty to others

Loyalty to one’s country in harmony with the promotion of local, national, and international peace, understanding, and cooperation. Participation in the development of society with recognition and respect for the dignity of humanity and for the integrity of the natural world This Scouting principle focuses on the individual's relationship with society and responsibility to it. Society is taken in the broadest sense of the word and includes family, local community, country and the world, as well as respect for all humanity and nature as a whole.

Duty to self

Responsibility for the development of oneself. This scouting principle reminds of a person's responsibility for developing their potential and how to best realize their abilities. In Scouting, everything is symbolic and closely connected, which is why the Scouting Principles are reflected in the Scout Emblem (three lily petals) and the Scout Sign (three straight fingers).

== Scout Law and Promise ==
A scout from Scouts of takes a Promise, written in the Constitution of the organization. It is an adaptation of the Promise from the WOSM Constitution: I promise to do everything in my power to honor my duty to God and my country, to help others everywhere and at all times, and to live by the Scout Law.

The decision to take the Promise is not made by an adult leader, patrol leader, or patrol. This decision can only be made by the person who wants to join the Scout movement.

There is only one Law and it consists of ten points. Its wording may vary from one National Scout Organization to another, depending on the culture and traditions of the country, but it is based on the Law formulated by the Founder of Scouting, Lord Baden-Powell. Every point of the Law is explained briefly, but it has a very deep meaning:

1. A scout’s honor is to be trusted

Honesty is the most valuable scout trait. It is important to be honest with yourself, because it is the honest people who are trusted by others.

2. A scout is loyal

A Scout is loyal to their family, friends, Scout Leaders, school, their people and country.

3. A Scout's duty is to be useful and to help others

A Scout cares about people around him and tries to be useful in his everyday life. He willingly helps others, not waiting for a reward. A Scout makes the world a better place, living by the motto «Not a day without a good deed».

4. A Scout is a friend to all and a brother to every other Scout

Every person has their own values and ideas of life. A Scout is friendly with everyone. He strives to understand others and respect those whose ideas and habits differ from his.

5. A scout is courteous

Being polite is not a sign of weakness, but instead a sign of strength. To be courteous you need to think about the others, and a Scout is courteous to everyone regardless of their age or status.

6. A scout is a friend of nature

A Scout treats all living things well. He studies the natural world so as not to disturb its ecological environment and harmonious existence. He not only cares about pets, but also helps other animals and nature in a safe way whenever possible.

7. A Scout is attentive to the instructions of his parents, Patrol Leader and Scout Leaders, without question

A Scout follows the rules and traditions of his family, school, and the Scout Group and Patrol. He obeys the laws of his community and country without breaking them.

8. A scout smiles and sings under all circumstances

A Scout looks at the world from the best side, with an optimistic outlook. He enjoys solving problems that come his way. Scouts make themselves and others happy and the world a better place.

9. A Scout is thrifty

A Scout does everything he does considering the future. He protects and preserves natural resources. He does not waste his own time and the time of others.

10. Scout's thoughts, words and actions are pure.

A Scout looks after his thoughts, words and actions so that he can do good things. He chooses to surround himself with people who share the same ideals and aspirations so that those around him and the world around him are also pure.

== Scout uniform and scarf ==
Each Scout has a Scout uniform on which he can sew all the patches he has earned reflecting his skills, which Scout group he belongs to, where he has already attended events, etc.

The most valuable thing every Scout has is a Scout scarf. At the national level, the scarf is blue with a yellow ribbon and the coat of arms of Ukraine, but each Scout group has the opportunity to have its own Scout scarf that reflects the individuality of that group. It is this element of Scouting attributes that is worn by the Scout after the solemn proclamation of the Scout Promise.

== Personal progression ==
Personal progression is a clearly presented general trajectory of the self-education process, within which everyone can choose their own path of progression in achieving independently set educational goals.

The stages of progression are incentives that encourage young people to move forward to achieve their personal goals. Each developmental stage is symbolized by a corresponding badge. The badge is issued at the beginning of the development stage, not at the end. They are meant to be an inspiration, not a prize.

Learning objectives are the outcomes that are expected at the end of the learning process in the Youth Programme and are expressed in terms of newly acquired capabilities. It can relate to knowledge (knowing), attitudes (being) or skills (doing).

== See also ==
- Scouting in Ukraine
- Nika Gorovska
