= Sergey Chesnokov =

Russian mathematician and sociologist

- Born: USSR
- Education: National Research Nuclear University
- Scientific career
- Fields: Mathematics, Sociology
- Workplaces: Sociology Institute of the Russian Academy of Sciences

Sergey Valerianovich Chesnokov (Russian: Сергей Валерианович Чесноков) is a Russian mathematician and sociologist who conducted pioneering work in the application of mathematical methods to sociological analysis. He is best known for creating and defining determinacy analysis and the theory of rules.

== Biography ==
Sergey Chesnokov was born on 29 June 1943 in Kulevi, Georgia. His father was a naval engineer and the family moved around the Soviet Union throughout Chesnokov's childhood. In 1960, he matriculated to the National Research Nuclear University in Moscow, graduating in 1965 with a degree in nuclear physics. In 1966, he pursued doctoral work at the Institute of Electrochemistry in a department headed by Veniamin Levich.

In 1969, Chesnokov became a researcher at the Institute of Sociological Research of the Soviet Academy of Sciences (currently the Institute of Sociology of the Russian Academy of Sciences), conducting work in the areas of mathematical applications to humanitarian sciences. He spent the next three years studying the methods of behavioral surveys and data analysis.

In 1972, Chesnokov came to the conclusion that there was no proper set of methods in mathematics for the analysis of statistical relationships found in sociological research. As a result, he began to develop his own determinacy analysis, also referred to as the theory of rules, to address this gap. Chesnokov's development work on determinacy analysis continued until 1980 when he completed the seminal work titled Determinacy Analysis of Socio-Economic Data. The work was published in 1982.

In 1980, Chesnokov decided to take a sabbatical. After spending a year in Tbilisi, he returned to Moscow and took on a series of jobs at the Taganka Theatre. His creative pursuits during this period included guitar and flamenco dancing lessons. He continued to pursue mathematics research in his spare time, formulating a new approach called determinacy logic and writing a series of papers, including an article for the American magazine Fuzzy Sets and Systems.

Throughout the rest of the 1980s and 1990s, Chesnokov continued to pursue his twin interests of mathematics research and creative work, becoming a musician and theatrical performer in his own right.

== Books ==
- Determinacy Analysis of Socio-Economic Data
- Phenomenology of Dialogues in Gestalt-Theory, Mathematics, Logic
