= Fraternities of Plast =

Ukrainian scouting-related organizataions

Kurin' (Ukrainian: курінь) are fraternities within the Ukrainian Plast Scouting organization. Scouts are also known Plastuny (Ukrainian: пластуни, lit. 'layerers').

== Lisovi Chorty ==
Lisovi Chorty fraternity
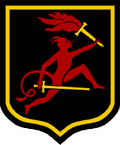
- Founded: July 22, 1922

Lisovi Chorty (Ukrainian: Лісові чорти, lit. 'Forest Devils'), full name Велике Плем'я Лісових Чортів, Velyke Plem'ya Lisovykh Chortiv ("The Great Tribe of Forest Devils") is the 3rd Kurin’ of Старші пластуни, starshi plastuny (Rover Scouts) and Сеньйори, sen'yory (Seniors).

Lisovi Chorty was founded by a troop of Scouts from Lviv, Ukraine on July 22, 1922. Historically, Lisovi Chorty, like Plast itself, was established on the principles of scouting, and its members were active in political and civil organizations, as well as military service, from its founding to the time that Ukrainian Scouting was banned by the Polish government in 1930, which led to the "underground" Scouting movement. Lisovi Chorty members took an active role in the attempt to gain Ukrainian independence during the Second World War. They subsequently migrated to countries that welcomed the Ukrainian diaspora, including Australia, Argentina, England, the United States of America, Canada, France and Germany. There, Lisovi Chorty undertook community and Plast work, ensuring a viable organization for future generations of Plastuny in the diaspora. After the breakup of the Soviet Union and the formation of an independent Ukraine, there was a rebirth of Plast in Ukraine and Lisovi Chorty waa re-established in the cities of Lviv, Kyiv, Ivano-Frankivsk, and others.

Lisovi Chorty has established sections in Argentina, Australia, Canada, Germany, Ireland, Poland, Portugal, Ukraine and the United States. Among the most famous members are UPA General Roman Shukhevych, politician Andriy Pyaseckyy, economist Bohdan Hawrylyshyn, the last president of the UNR (in exile) Mykola Plavyuk, writer Vasyl Karkhut, Bishop Hlib Lonchyna, and civil and political figure Stepan Okhrymovych.

== Order of the Iron Spur ==
Order of the Iron Spur
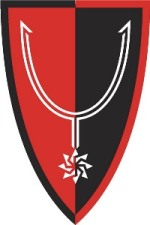
- Founded: November 1916
- Patron: Sviatoslav the Conqueror
- Founder: Ivan Tsiapka
- Komtur: Yaroslav Yurchyshyn

The Order of the Iron Spur (Орден Залізної Остроги, Orden Zaliznoyi Ostrohy) is a male troop of the Ukrainian Plast Scouting organization. It is the 15th kurin' of Rover Scouts.

=== History ===
It was founded as the Order of the Iron Spur Chivalry in November 1916 by group of Ukrainian Sich Riflemen, led by centurion Ivan Tsiapka (who later became the first Grand Komtur), although the founder is considered to be Leo Lepky. The Order was dissolved and afterwards revived by Plastuny (who were considered by former Order members to be their successors), in 1927, as a part of Plast. The aim of the modern Order, revived in 1996, is to develop Plast organization structure and Plast specializations as well as to promote the healthy lifestyle amongst Plast members.

=== Insignia of the Order ===
The composition base is the emblem of Sviatoslav the Conqueror (the bident) which comes from the spur sign, the symbol of Ukrainian chivalry of princely times. The bident of Svyatoslav, like a cross or a trident, is a symbol of the main principles of world growth: the combination of the two main life-giving principles (spirit and matter; fire and water; male and female).

=== The Will of Sviatoslav the Conqueror ===
Folk legends preserved the tale about Sviatoslav the Conqueror, who was about to go in the campaign against the Bulgarians. Once, during the campaign, his faithful horse had suddenly stopped and Sviatoslav refused to go into battle: magi believed that if the horse resisted going into battle, it was a sign that the soldier would not return alive from the battlefield, and predicted the Grand Prince's death. A smith, Hysch, promised to invent a tool that would force a horse to go in the campaign. The blacksmith thus forged the first pair of iron spurs. The horse went on a campaign and Svyatoslav returned with victory and glory. Then, the Prince thanked Hysch and gave him a will to found the Ruthenian Order of Knights, in honor of the Iron Spurs. Ivan Tsiapka, the future Grand Komtur of the Order, had a dream about this legend and decided to implement the Will of Sviatoslav.

== Orden Khrestonistsiv ==
Orden Khrestonostsiv fraternity
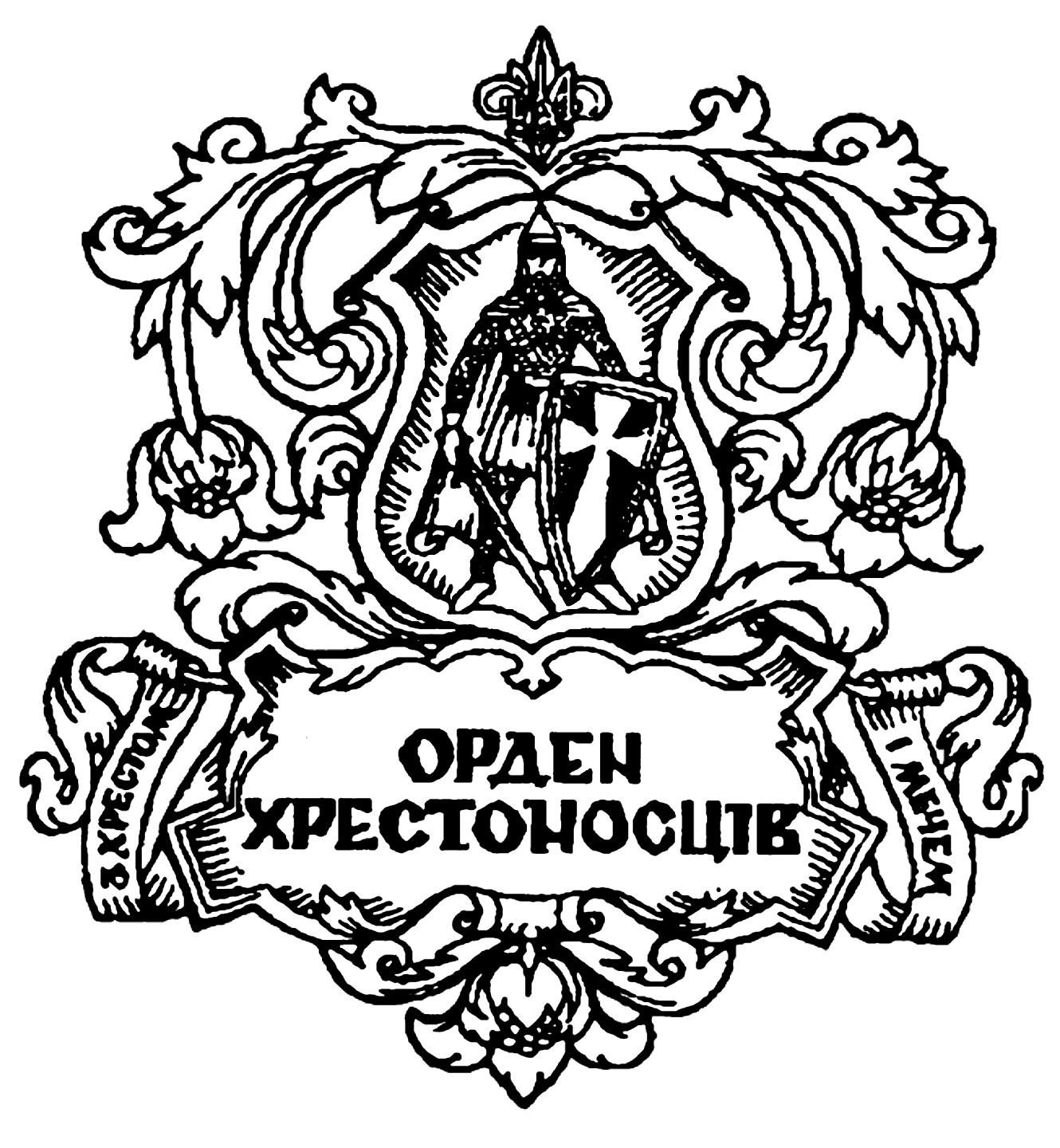
- Velikiy Mayster: Oles' Labunka; Lytsar Amadeus
- Patron: Metropolitan Andriy Sheptytsky

Orden Khrestonistsiv (Орден Хрестоносцiв, 'Order of Crusaders') is a male fraternity of the Ukrainian Plast. It is the 5th kurin' of Rover Scouts and the 20th kurin' of Seniors. Together, these two Fraternities form the Orden Khrestonostsiv, named after Svyatoslav the Conqueror.

=== History ===
The Orden was founded in March 1946, in the town of Traunstein in Bavaria, Germany. Its founders were sixteen plastuny who were displaced from Western Ukraine after World War II. Most of them were aged 18 through 20, and either in or entering universities and seminaries.

In 1948, the Orden had spread to include Scouts in the United States, Canada, France and Belgium. Members can also be found in Argentina, Australia, Japan and, since 2002, in Ukraine once more.

=== Structure and organization ===
The Orden has its own leadership that is led by the "Velykiy Mayster" (Ukrainian: Великий Майстер, lit. 'Grand Master'), a "Velikiy Skriptor" (Ukrainian: Великий Скриптор, lit. 'grand scribe'), and a "Velikiy Trezoriy" (Ukrainian: Великий Трезорій, lit. 'grand treasurer'). There are additional posts of "Heral'dist" (Ukrainian: Геральдист, lit. 'herald', or 'archivist') and "Tseremoniyalmayster" (Ukrainian: Церемоніалмайстер, lit. 'master of ceremonies and traditions').

Throughout the year, the activities of the members of both kurini are conducted both individually and through local chapters or стежі, stezhi, which combine members of both kurini. There are, or have been, stezhi in Chicago, Illinois; Buffalo, New York; New York City, New York; Jersey City, New Jersey; Philadelphia, Pennsylvania; and Ternopil', Ukraine, among others.

Every two years, both kurini of the Orden meet at a "Velyka Rada" (Велика Рада, 'Great Council') to elect new leadership of each kurin' and of the Orden itself. The first Rada was held in Traunstein, Germany. With the growth of the Orden in the United States, most "Rady" have been held in various North American ding East Chatham, New York; Parma, Ohio; Chicago, Illinois; Buffalo, New York; Fox Chase, Pennsylvania; Princeton, New Jersey; and Lviv, Ukraine). In the 21st cntury, amongst stezhi in Ukraine, a "Rada" may open in one city in one continent, be suspended and then resume in another city and continent. (Note: In intermediate years, each kurin' of the Orden has a "Mala Rada" (Ukrainian: Мала Рада, lit. 'Small Council') ... nowadays, with the "Senior Scouts" being more numerous than the "Older Scouts," a "Mala Rada" often includes members of both organizations. In addition to the formal "rady" and local activity in the "stezhi," there are also informal and sporadic "Reydy" (Ukrainian: рейди, lit. 'raids') that are organized around the world.)

=== Ranks and titles, traditions ===
The Orden is a fairly egalitarian organization, with only three basic levels of membership. (Note: "Kandydaty" or "Damski Kavalyery" are candidates for membership and, upon submission of an application for membership, are allowed to wear an emblem consisting of the black-and-white shield.; "Aspiranty" have been affiliated with the kurin sufficiently to be steeped in the kurin's traditions, and have proven their mettle through a series of secret ordeals, and are allowed nearly all privileges of membership. They wear an emblem (vidznaka) that consists of the entire OX symbol including the letters "OX," the shield, sword and a globe, albeit without the knight.; "Lytsari" (or "Knights") are full members of the Orden, and have proven their worth by their deeds and actions over a period of at least two years of being "aspiranty." They are knighted in a ceremony called "pasuvannia" and given their knightly name ("psevdo"). Henceforth, they are known to all members of the Orden as "Lytsar <name>." All Lytsari have the same privileges, but historical seniority and tradition segregates them into "Older Lytsari" and "Younger Lytsari.") At formal gatherings, all members are aligned according to rank and, within rank, in order of their knighthood or entry into the Orden.

The Orden is rich in traditions and ceremonies. Many of these are secret rituals including the канапа, kanapa, пасування, pasuvannia and клейноди, kleynody and are not disclosed to non-initiates. The membership scarf is black and has the fraternity's shield with a cross in the corner. Its patron saint is Metropolitan Andriy Sheptytskyi.

Anthem and slogan

The "Hymn Khrestonostsiv" is solemnly intoned by all members at every formal gathering. The slogan of the Orden is "Z khrestom i mechem --- za Ukrayinu!" which translates to "With the Cross and the sword, for Ukraine!"

Symbolism

The shield of the Orden is a Crusader Knight, with a sword and a shield of with a cross, reminiscent of the shield of the Knights Hospitaller.

At most Orden events, the key accoutrements are a прапор, prapor (flag standard), a меч, metch (sword), and four клейноді, kleynody (precious stones) that symbolize the Plast slogan of "SKOB" - "Syl'no, Krasno, Oberezhno, Bystro" ("Strongly, Beautifully, Carefully, Speedily").

Core principles

The five core principles of the Orden are:

- A Christian worldview
- Active patriotism
- Adherence to the core Plast values and a chivalrous spirit
- Personal intellectual enrichment
- Active participation in the spiritual revitalization of the world

Wedding ceremony

At weddings of one of their comrades, all members of the kurin' participate in a ritual (церемоніал, tseremoniyal, 'ceremony') that includes four specific elements. (Note: Proklamatsiya (Ukrainian: прокламація, lit. 'proclamation') ... an edict read to all present, announcing, among other facts, that the wife of the member is henceforth admitted as a member of the Orden, with virtually the same privileges.; Presentatsiya Dariv (Ukrainian: презентація Дарів, lit. 'presentation of Gifts'), which typically include a bible, a scroll and a sword.; Aklyamatsiya Molodoho (Ukrainian: аклямація Молодого, lit. 'acclamation of the Groom') ... a celebration of the member, which includes the member being borne atop an OX shield.; Adoratsiya Molodoyi (Ukrainian: адорація Молодої, lit. 'the adoration of the Bride') ... each member of the Orden, in order of rank and seniority, is introduced to the bride and dances with the bride, with the finale reserved for the groom.)

== Vovkulaky ==
Vovkulaky fraternity

Vovkulaky (Ukrainian: Вовкулаки) is a fraternity with members in Ukraine, Canada, the United States, Germany, Australia and England. The beginning of Vovkulaky dates back to 1946-1947. It was organized as "Wolf", later going by "Forest Wolves" and "Werewolves".

== See also ==
- Scouting and Guiding in Ukraine
