= Organizatsiya Ukraïns'kykh Skautiv =

Scouting organization in Ukraine

- Headquarters: Lviv
- Country: Ukraine
- Founded: 2000
- Membership: 650
- Chief Scout: Alexander Matsiyevskyy
- Affiliation: Order of World Scouts
- Website; Organizatsiya Ukraïns'kych Skautiv

The Organizatsiya Ukraïns'kykh Skautiv (Ukrainian Організація Українських Скаутів ОУС "Organization of Ukrainian Scouts", OUS) is a Scouting organization in Ukraine, a member of the Order of World Scouts.

After several unsuccessful attempts to join the World Federation of Independent Scouts (WFIS), the OUS became full member of the Order of World Scouts in April 2009.

== Program sections ==
- Vovcheniata (Cub Scouts) – ages 6 to 9
- Skauty (Scouts) – ages 10 to 14
- Kadety (Cadettes -older members) – ages 15 – 18
- Roverskauty (Rovers) – ages 18+

== Main principles ==
- Loyalty to God and Ukraine
- Duty to others and to itself
- Obedience to the Scout law

=== Cub Scout Promise ===
The pledge commits members to strive to remain faithful to God, their parents, and their homeland of Ukraine, to uphold the Cub Scout Law, and to perform a good deed each day.

=== Cub Scout Law ===
1. a Cub Scout loves Ukraine.
2. a Cub Scout thinks of others first
3. a Cub Scout has eyes and ears open (Cub Scout hears and sees all)
4. a Cub Scout is always clean
5. a Cub Scout always tells the truth
6. a Cub Scout is always cheerful.

=== Scout Law ===
1. Ukraine serves as a scout and performs in front of her his duties.
2. Word scout trust.
3. a Scout-poradlyvyy and helping others.
4. a Scout-all friend and brother of every other scout.
5. a Scout comes in a knight.
6. a Scout loves nature and tries to understand her.
7. a Scout-responsible and obedient to their parents and taught.
8. a Scout always has a good mood.
9. a Scout-economical and sacrificial.
10. a Scout-clean in thought, words and actions.

=== Scout Oath ===
In his honour I swear that I will do everything in my power to:

- Do my duty to God and the State,
- always help others
- obey the Scout Law.
