= Andriy Chesnokov =

Ukrainian scouts council former president

Andriy Chesnokov PhD
- Андрій Чесноков

Chairman of the National Council of the National Organization of Scouts of Ukraine

Andriy Chesnokov (Ukrainian: Андрій Чесноков, Russian: Андрей Чесноков) PhD of Bryanka, Ukraine, is chairman and former president of the National Council of the National Organization of Scouts of Ukraine, as well as a member of the Eurasia Regional Scout Committee of the World Organization of the Scout Movement (WOSM).

Chesnokov is former chief adviser of the Presidential Administration of Ukraine, was an attaché at the European Integration Department of the Ministry of Foreign Affairs of Ukraine and the Embassy of Ukraine to the Russian Federation, managed the Secretariat of the President of Ukraine, and is counselor at the Permanent Mission of Ukraine to the International Organizations in Vienna.

Chesnokov was previously the vice president of International Relations at the National Organization of Scouts of Ukraine.

Chesnokov was educated at the Kyiv National Taras Shevchenko University. He is married and lives in Vienna, Austria.
