= Michael Cottam (disambiguation) =

Michael Cottam may refer to:

- Michael Cottam (born 1966), an English cricketer
- Michael Gordon Cottam (born 1945), an English–Canadian physicist

== See also ==
- Asteroid 273262 Cottam, named after the physicist
