= Eduardo Missoni =

Italian medical doctor (born 1954)

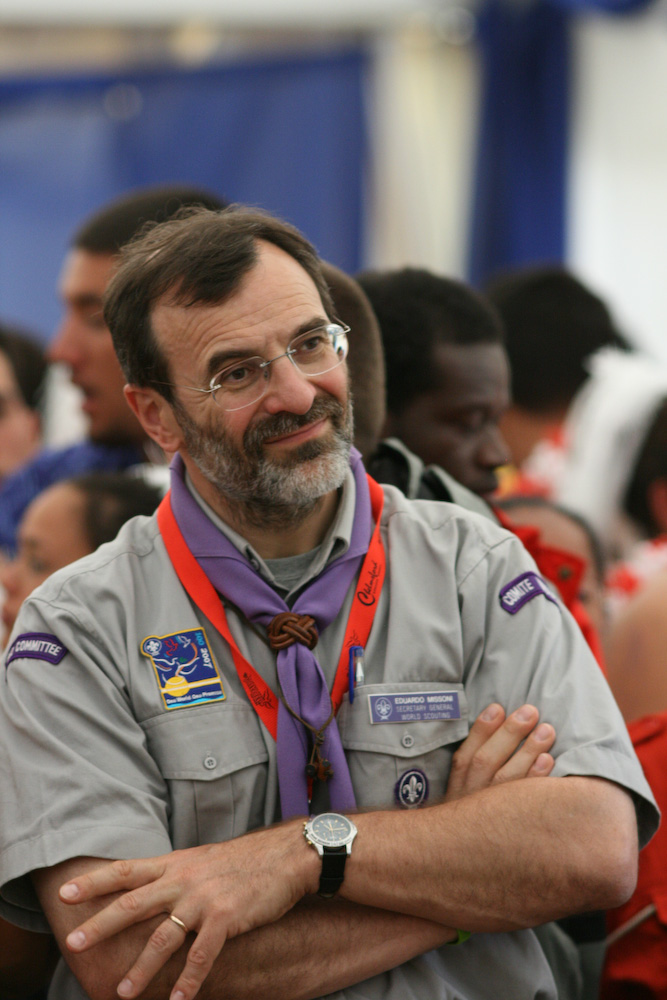
- Eduardo Missoni at the 21st World Scout Jamboree.
- Born: July 31, 1954 (age 71); Rome
- Education: Rome University
- Occupation: Medical doctor
- Known for: Active in numerous social causes
- Medical career
- Field: Tropical medicine
- Institutions: Bocconi University Management School

Eduardo Missoni (born July 31, 1954 in Rome) is an Italian medical doctor who has been active in numerous social causes. He was appointed as the Secretary General of the World Organization of the Scout Movement from April 1, 2004 through November 30, 2007.

== Life ==
Dr. Missoni received his medical training and specialty in tropical medicine from Rome University. He subsequently obtained a master's degree from the London School of Hygiene & Tropical Medicine. He is a professor at Bocconi University Management School in Milan. His area of teaching and research is related to health development cooperation management and global strategies for health.

He began his career as a volunteer doctor in Nicaragua. He was later employed as a UNICEF officer in Mexico. He worked for the Italian government in the capacity of adviser and representative for health cooperation programs in Latin America and sub-Saharan Africa.

As a youth in Italy Dr. Missoni joined the Scout movement. Later, as a young adult he became a Scout leader and remained active in Scouting until he left for his medical mission in Nicaragua. Many years later, without having applied for the position, he was "headhunted" on behalf of the World Scout Committee and was selected as the new Secretary General of WOSM. He took office April 1, 2004.

== WOSM crisis ==
On October 15, 2007, a group of National Scouting Organizations wrote an open letter of complaint to the World Scout Committee. The main complaints were that the World Scout Bureau was not focusing on National Scouting Organizations, especially those in developing countries and that there were governance and management issues within the World Scout Bureau.

Two days later, the Boy Scouts of America sent a letter to the WSC reiterating their position and stating that they would withhold funding to the WSB until the current Secretary General was replaced and appropriate processes instituted to restore the WSB its core mission. Svenska Scoutrådet followed with a similar letter. The World Scout Foundation, which had been instituted to insure a reliable funding source for the movement, followed suit.

The World Scout Committee wrote an uncirculated response to these requests on October 24. Several National Scout Organizations expressed concern at this economic coercion. On November 12, 2007, the World Scout Committee met in Cairo and relieved Missoni from his position as Secretary General, despite his opposition and that of many committee members. He was to maintain representative duties until November 30. On November 30, 2007, Eduardo Missoni wrote a chronology of what he called a "putsch" on his personal web page, releasing many documents which were unknown at the time and giving his point of view.

== Awards and honors ==
Asteroid 273412 Eduardomissoni, discovered by Italian amateur astronomer Silvano Casulli in 2006, was named in his honor. The official naming citation was published by the Minor Planet Center on May 29, 2018 (M.P.C. 110618).

== See also ==
- World Organization of the Scout Movement

World Organization of the Scout Movement
Preceded by Jacques Moreillon	Secretary General; 2004-2007	Succeeded by Luc Panissod
