= Luc Panissod =

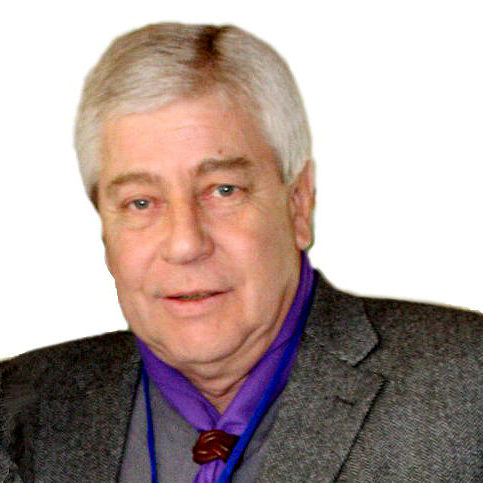

Secretary General of the World Organization of the Scout Movement
- In office 2007–2011
- Preceded by: Eduardo Missoni
- Succeeded by: Scott Teare

Luc Panissod (born 1949 in France) was Secretary General of the World Organization of the Scout Movement (WOSM). He previously held the role of Deputy Secretary General of WOSM and was made acting WOSM Secretary General in mid-November 2007 in replacement of Eduardo Missoni, following an institutional crisis over leadership and finance. In March 2009 he was officially appointed to the position of Secretary General of WOSM. Panissod laid down his post on 31 December 2011.

Responsibilities at WOSM fall into two divisions, each headed by an Executive Director. In his role as Deputy Secretary General, Panissod was in charge of General Management, responsible for Administration, Finance, Personnel, Technology and Information, Resource Mobilization, Design, Partnerships, World Events, and Documents and Archiving.

Panissod studied at the Sorbonne University in Paris, and completed a Diploma in Economics, a Masters in Economics, and then a Certificat d'Aptitude à l'Administration des Entreprises CAAE-MBA at one of its affiliated institutes. He was preparing his PhD on the "Marketing of public and social causes" when he joined the World Scout Bureau in 1982.

In 1991 he was promoted to Deputy Secretary General of WOSM, responsible for the General Management of the World Scout Bureau.

Panissod was also the liaison for the Asia-Pacific, Eurasian and Africa offices.

In his role as the Secretary General, Panissod manages Institutional Support, Constitutional Affairs, Planning, Strategy and Strategic Evaluation, Communication and External Relations.

Panissod was awarded the Bronze Wolf in 1996.

World Organization of the Scout Movement
Preceded by Eduardo Missoni	Secretary General of the World Organization of the Scout Movement; 2007-2009 acting 2009 - 2011	Succeeded by Scott Teare
