= Jacques Moreillon =

Secretary General of the World Organization of the Scout Movement
- In office 1988–2004
- Preceded by: László Nagy
- Succeeded by: Eduardo Missoni

Jacques Moreillon (born 1939) served as Director General of the International Committee of the Red Cross (ICRC) until 1988 and as Secretary General of the World Organization of the Scout Movement (WOSM) from November 1, 1988 to March 31, 2004.

Moreillon was born in Vevey, Switzerland. He studied at the University of Lausanne and obtained a doctorate in political science from the Graduate Institute of International Studies in Geneva. He became an ICRC delegate in 1965, and rose to the rank of Director General by 1988.

In 1988 he became Secretary General of the World Organization of the Scout Movement (WOSM), a role he held until 2004. During this time the WOSM membership grew from 16 million members in 120 countries to 28 million members in 155 countries.

== See also ==
- World Organization of the Scout Movement

World Organization of the Scout Movement
Preceded by László Nagy	Secretary General; 1988-2004	Succeeded by Eduardo Missoni
