= Meanings of minor-planet names: 273001–274000 =

As minor planet discoveries are confirmed, they are given a permanent number by the IAU's Minor Planet Center (MPC), and the discoverers can then submit names for them, following the IAU's naming conventions. The list below concerns those minor planets in the specified number-range that have received names, and explains the meanings of those names.

Official naming citations of newly named small Solar System bodies are approved and published in a bulletin by IAU's Working Group for Small Bodies Nomenclature (WGSBN). Before May 2021, citations were published in MPC's Minor Planet Circulars for many decades. Recent citations can also be found on the JPL Small-Body Database (SBDB). Until his death in 2016, German astronomer Lutz D. Schmadel compiled these citations into the Dictionary of Minor Planet Names (DMP) and regularly updated the collection.

Based on Paul Herget's The Names of the Minor Planets, Schmadel also researched the unclear origin of numerous asteroids, most of which had been named prior to World War II. This article incorporates text from this source, which is in the public domain: SBDB New namings may only be added to this list below after official publication as the preannouncement of names is condemned. The WGSBN publishes a comprehensive guideline for the naming rules of non-cometary small Solar System bodies.

== 273001–273100 ==
Named minor planet	Provisional	This minor planet was named for...	Ref · Catalog
There are no named minor planets in this number range

== 273101–273200 ==
back to top

Named minor planet	Provisional	This minor planet was named for...	Ref · Catalog
There are no named minor planets in this number range

== 273201–273300 ==
back to top

Named minor planet	Provisional	This minor planet was named for...	Ref · Catalog
273230 de Bruyn	2006 JU_{72}	John Roy de Bruyn (born 1958), a Canadian physicist working on experimental condensed-matter physics, with emphasis on soft materials, the physics of biological systems, and the dynamics of systems driven out of equilibrium	JPL · 273230
273262 Cottam	2006 KJ_{142}	Michael Gordon Cottam (born 1945), an English-Canadian physicist at the University of Western Ontario. He works in the field of condensed matter physics, with focus on surface physics, nanomaterials, and nonlinear processes in solids, and includes magnetic, optical, and electronic properties of these materials (Src).	JPL · 273262
273273 Piwowarski	2006 OR_{9}	Marcin Piwowarski (1984–2007), a computer consultant, specializing in flight simulators	JPL · 273273

== 273301–273400 ==
back to top

Named minor planet	Provisional	This minor planet was named for...	Ref · Catalog
There are no named minor planets in this number range

== 273401–273500 ==
back to top

Named minor planet	Provisional	This minor planet was named for...	Ref · Catalog
273412 Eduardomissoni	2006 WF_{2}	Eduardo Missoni (born 1954) is an Italian physician specializing in tropical medicine. He is a professor at Bocconi University Management School in Milan, and worked for the Italian government in the cooperation management and health programs in Latin America and sub-Saharan Africa.	JPL · 273412

== 273501–273600 ==
back to top

Named minor planet	Provisional	This minor planet was named for...	Ref · Catalog
There are no named minor planets in this number range

== 273601–273700 ==
back to top

Named minor planet	Provisional	This minor planet was named for...	Ref · Catalog
There are no named minor planets in this number range

== 273701–273800 ==
back to top

Named minor planet	Provisional	This minor planet was named for...	Ref · Catalog
There are no named minor planets in this number range

== 273801–273900 ==
back to top

Named minor planet	Provisional	This minor planet was named for...	Ref · Catalog
273836 Hoijyusek	2007 GZ_{27}	Hoi Jyu Sek (Haizhushi), "the Rock of the Pearl in Sea", was a large rock in the Pearl River that had been treated as an icon of Guangzhou (Canton) for many centuries.	JPL · 273836

== 273901–274000 ==
back to top

Named minor planet	Provisional	This minor planet was named for...	Ref · Catalog
273936 Tangjingchuan	2007 JC_{16}	Tang Shunzhi (1507–1560), also known as Tang Jingchuan, was a famous Chinese writer, poet and statesman in the Ming dynasty. A native of Changzhou, Tang's argument for the "concrete studies" (shixue) made him an important figure in the Changzhou intellectual framework.	JPL · 273936
273987 Greggwade	2007 LQ_{30}	Gregg Wade (born 1971), a Canadian astrophysicist at the Royal Military College of Canada whose research includes the structure, evolution, origin and impact of magnetic fields in larger stars (Src).	JPL · 273987
273994 Cinqueterre	2007 NH_{1}	The Italian region of Cinque Terre ("Five Villages") in Liguria. The coastline and the surrounding hillsides are all part of the Cinque Terre National Park, which is a UNESCO World Heritage Site.	JPL · 273994

back to top

Preceded by 272,001–273,000	Meanings of minor-planet names List of minor planets: 273,001–274,000	Succeeded by 274,001–275,000
