= List of minor planets: 273001–274000 =

The following is a partial list of minor planets, running from minor-planet number 273001 through 274000, inclusive. The primary data for this and other partial lists is based on JPL's "Small-Body Orbital Elements" and data available from the Minor Planet Center. Critical list information is also provided by the MPC, unless otherwise specified from Lowell Observatory. A detailed description of the table's columns and additional sources are given on the main page including a complete list of every page in this series, and a statistical break-up on the dynamical classification of minor planets.

Also see the summary list of all named bodies in numerical and alphabetical order, and the corresponding naming citations for the number range of this particular list. New namings may only be added to this list after official publication, as the preannouncement of names is condemned by the Working Group for Small Bodies Nomenclature of the International Astronomical Union.

Near-Earth obj.	MBA (inner)	MBA (outer)	Centaur
Mars-crosser	MBA (middle)	Jupiter trojan	Trans-Neptunian obj.
Unclassified

== 273001–273100 ==
Designation			Discovery			Properties		Ref
Permanent	Provisional	Named after	Date	Site	Discoverer(s)	Category	Diam.	Ref
273001	2006 DJ_{68}	—	February 23, 2006	Anderson Mesa	LONEOS	·	3.8 km	MPC · JPL
273002	2006 DL_{69}	—	February 20, 2006	Kitt Peak	Spacewatch	KOR	2.2 km	MPC · JPL
273003	2006 DU_{71}	—	February 21, 2006	Mount Lemmon	Mount Lemmon Survey	EOS	2.2 km	MPC · JPL
273004	2006 DL_{73}	—	February 22, 2006	Mount Lemmon	Mount Lemmon Survey	·	5.5 km	MPC · JPL
273005	2006 DU_{74}	—	February 24, 2006	Kitt Peak	Spacewatch	·	2.6 km	MPC · JPL
273006	2006 DF_{78}	—	February 24, 2006	Kitt Peak	Spacewatch	·	2.3 km	MPC · JPL
273007	2006 DV_{78}	—	February 24, 2006	Kitt Peak	Spacewatch	·	2.2 km	MPC · JPL
273008	2006 DO_{79}	—	February 24, 2006	Kitt Peak	Spacewatch	·	2.9 km	MPC · JPL
273009	2006 DT_{81}	—	February 24, 2006	Kitt Peak	Spacewatch	·	3.3 km	MPC · JPL
273010	2006 DD_{82}	—	February 24, 2006	Kitt Peak	Spacewatch	MRX	1.4 km	MPC · JPL
273011	2006 DL_{82}	—	February 24, 2006	Kitt Peak	Spacewatch	KOR	1.9 km	MPC · JPL
273012	2006 DQ_{82}	—	February 24, 2006	Kitt Peak	Spacewatch	KOR	1.5 km	MPC · JPL
273013	2006 DT_{83}	—	October 13, 1994	Kitt Peak	Spacewatch	KOR	1.5 km	MPC · JPL
273014	2006 DB_{86}	—	February 24, 2006	Kitt Peak	Spacewatch	KOR	1.9 km	MPC · JPL
273015	2006 DD_{86}	—	February 24, 2006	Kitt Peak	Spacewatch	·	3.0 km	MPC · JPL
273016	2006 DA_{87}	—	February 24, 2006	Kitt Peak	Spacewatch	·	2.9 km	MPC · JPL
273017	2006 DF_{87}	—	February 24, 2006	Kitt Peak	Spacewatch	·	2.1 km	MPC · JPL
273018	2006 DF_{90}	—	February 24, 2006	Kitt Peak	Spacewatch	·	4.2 km	MPC · JPL
273019	2006 DE_{91}	—	February 24, 2006	Mount Lemmon	Mount Lemmon Survey	·	2.3 km	MPC · JPL
273020	2006 DF_{94}	—	February 24, 2006	Kitt Peak	Spacewatch	·	3.2 km	MPC · JPL
273021	2006 DN_{97}	—	February 24, 2006	Kitt Peak	Spacewatch	·	3.8 km	MPC · JPL
273022	2006 DJ_{98}	—	February 25, 2006	Kitt Peak	Spacewatch	·	1.4 km	MPC · JPL
273023	2006 DO_{98}	—	February 25, 2006	Kitt Peak	Spacewatch	EOS	2.3 km	MPC · JPL
273024	2006 DL_{101}	—	February 25, 2006	Kitt Peak	Spacewatch	·	3.0 km	MPC · JPL
273025	2006 DL_{107}	—	February 25, 2006	Kitt Peak	Spacewatch	·	1.9 km	MPC · JPL
273026	2006 DW_{111}	—	February 27, 2006	Mount Lemmon	Mount Lemmon Survey	MRX	1.4 km	MPC · JPL
273027	2006 DG_{112}	—	February 27, 2006	Mount Lemmon	Mount Lemmon Survey	·	4.3 km	MPC · JPL
273028	2006 DP_{112}	—	February 27, 2006	Mount Lemmon	Mount Lemmon Survey	·	2.4 km	MPC · JPL
273029	2006 DJ_{113}	—	February 27, 2006	Kitt Peak	Spacewatch	KOR	2.2 km	MPC · JPL
273030	2006 DC_{114}	—	February 27, 2006	Socorro	LINEAR	DOR	2.8 km	MPC · JPL
273031	2006 DD_{117}	—	February 27, 2006	Kitt Peak	Spacewatch	AST	2.3 km	MPC · JPL
273032	2006 DK_{118}	—	February 27, 2006	Kitt Peak	Spacewatch	·	3.4 km	MPC · JPL
273033	2006 DC_{120}	—	February 20, 2006	Catalina	CSS	·	2.6 km	MPC · JPL
273034	2006 DF_{122}	—	February 23, 2006	Anderson Mesa	LONEOS	·	4.0 km	MPC · JPL
273035	2006 DZ_{124}	—	February 25, 2006	Kitt Peak	Spacewatch	AGN	1.3 km	MPC · JPL
273036	2006 DV_{125}	—	February 25, 2006	Kitt Peak	Spacewatch	AGN	1.3 km	MPC · JPL
273037	2006 DG_{128}	—	February 25, 2006	Mount Lemmon	Mount Lemmon Survey	·	2.1 km	MPC · JPL
273038	2006 DK_{128}	—	February 25, 2006	Kitt Peak	Spacewatch	AGN	1.5 km	MPC · JPL
273039	2006 DE_{132}	—	February 25, 2006	Kitt Peak	Spacewatch	·	3.6 km	MPC · JPL
273040	2006 DN_{132}	—	February 25, 2006	Kitt Peak	Spacewatch	·	2.7 km	MPC · JPL
273041	2006 DU_{133}	—	February 25, 2006	Kitt Peak	Spacewatch	·	2.2 km	MPC · JPL
273042	2006 DG_{137}	—	February 25, 2006	Kitt Peak	Spacewatch	·	2.2 km	MPC · JPL
273043	2006 DL_{137}	—	February 25, 2006	Kitt Peak	Spacewatch	KOR	1.5 km	MPC · JPL
273044	2006 DN_{138}	—	February 25, 2006	Kitt Peak	Spacewatch	AEO	1.6 km	MPC · JPL
273045	2006 DX_{138}	—	February 25, 2006	Kitt Peak	Spacewatch	AGN	1.6 km	MPC · JPL
273046	2006 DE_{139}	—	February 25, 2006	Kitt Peak	Spacewatch	·	4.3 km	MPC · JPL
273047	2006 DP_{141}	—	February 25, 2006	Kitt Peak	Spacewatch	HOF	3.9 km	MPC · JPL
273048	2006 DW_{142}	—	February 25, 2006	Kitt Peak	Spacewatch	·	2.1 km	MPC · JPL
273049	2006 DC_{145}	—	February 25, 2006	Mount Lemmon	Mount Lemmon Survey	KOR	1.7 km	MPC · JPL
273050	2006 DR_{157}	—	February 27, 2006	Kitt Peak	Spacewatch	·	3.1 km	MPC · JPL
273051	2006 DV_{158}	—	February 27, 2006	Kitt Peak	Spacewatch	KOR	2.2 km	MPC · JPL
273052	2006 DK_{161}	—	February 27, 2006	Kitt Peak	Spacewatch	KOR	1.5 km	MPC · JPL
273053	2006 DG_{164}	—	February 27, 2006	Mount Lemmon	Mount Lemmon Survey	AGN	1.4 km	MPC · JPL
273054	2006 DF_{165}	—	February 27, 2006	Kitt Peak	Spacewatch	·	6.1 km	MPC · JPL
273055	2006 DJ_{173}	—	February 27, 2006	Kitt Peak	Spacewatch	·	3.0 km	MPC · JPL
273056	2006 DS_{173}	—	February 27, 2006	Kitt Peak	Spacewatch	615	1.5 km	MPC · JPL
273057	2006 DU_{173}	—	February 27, 2006	Kitt Peak	Spacewatch	·	4.0 km	MPC · JPL
273058	2006 DP_{177}	—	February 27, 2006	Mount Lemmon	Mount Lemmon Survey	·	2.5 km	MPC · JPL
273059	2006 DF_{178}	—	February 27, 2006	Mount Lemmon	Mount Lemmon Survey	·	4.5 km	MPC · JPL
273060	2006 DM_{178}	—	February 27, 2006	Mount Lemmon	Mount Lemmon Survey	·	2.2 km	MPC · JPL
273061	2006 DT_{185}	—	November 20, 2003	Palomar	NEAT	·	2.5 km	MPC · JPL
273062	2006 DQ_{186}	—	February 27, 2006	Kitt Peak	Spacewatch	·	2.7 km	MPC · JPL
273063	2006 DC_{190}	—	February 27, 2006	Kitt Peak	Spacewatch	·	4.1 km	MPC · JPL
273064	2006 DM_{190}	—	February 27, 2006	Kitt Peak	Spacewatch	KOR	2.2 km	MPC · JPL
273065	2006 DD_{191}	—	February 27, 2006	Kitt Peak	Spacewatch	·	2.0 km	MPC · JPL
273066	2006 DY_{192}	—	February 27, 2006	Kitt Peak	Spacewatch	THM	2.8 km	MPC · JPL
273067	2006 DR_{195}	—	February 20, 2006	Catalina	CSS	·	2.9 km	MPC · JPL
273068	2006 DD_{197}	—	February 24, 2006	Catalina	CSS	BRA	2.3 km	MPC · JPL
273069	2006 DE_{197}	—	February 24, 2006	Catalina	CSS	·	4.2 km	MPC · JPL
273070	2006 DO_{212}	—	February 24, 2006	Kitt Peak	Spacewatch	·	2.3 km	MPC · JPL
273071	2006 DV_{212}	—	February 24, 2006	Kitt Peak	Spacewatch	·	4.3 km	MPC · JPL
273072	2006 DW_{214}	—	February 20, 2006	Kitt Peak	Spacewatch	·	2.7 km	MPC · JPL
273073	2006 DF_{215}	—	February 22, 2006	Anderson Mesa	LONEOS	·	3.2 km	MPC · JPL
273074	2006 DG_{215}	—	February 24, 2006	Kitt Peak	Spacewatch	AST	2.0 km	MPC · JPL
273075	2006 EX_{1}	—	March 3, 2006	Mount Nyukasa	Japan Aerospace Exploration Agency	(12739)	2.1 km	MPC · JPL
273076	2006 EQ_{3}	—	March 2, 2006	Kitt Peak	Spacewatch	·	4.2 km	MPC · JPL
273077	2006 ED_{4}	—	March 2, 2006	Kitt Peak	Spacewatch	NEM	2.2 km	MPC · JPL
273078	2006 EG_{7}	—	March 2, 2006	Kitt Peak	Spacewatch	EOS	4.7 km	MPC · JPL
273079	2006 EL_{9}	—	March 2, 2006	Kitt Peak	Spacewatch	KOR	1.5 km	MPC · JPL
273080	2006 EC_{10}	—	March 2, 2006	Kitt Peak	Spacewatch	·	1.7 km	MPC · JPL
273081	2006 EP_{14}	—	March 2, 2006	Kitt Peak	Spacewatch	AST	1.9 km	MPC · JPL
273082	2006 EZ_{14}	—	March 2, 2006	Kitt Peak	Spacewatch	KOR	1.4 km	MPC · JPL
273083	2006 EG_{19}	—	March 2, 2006	Kitt Peak	Spacewatch	EOS ·	3.5 km	MPC · JPL
273084	2006 EF_{20}	—	March 3, 2006	Kitt Peak	Spacewatch	AGN	1.3 km	MPC · JPL
273085	2006 EU_{21}	—	March 3, 2006	Kitt Peak	Spacewatch	·	1.9 km	MPC · JPL
273086	2006 EE_{22}	—	March 3, 2006	Kitt Peak	Spacewatch	·	1.9 km	MPC · JPL
273087	2006 EC_{23}	—	March 3, 2006	Kitt Peak	Spacewatch	THM	2.5 km	MPC · JPL
273088	2006 EO_{24}	—	March 3, 2006	Kitt Peak	Spacewatch	·	2.5 km	MPC · JPL
273089	2006 EZ_{28}	—	March 3, 2006	Kitt Peak	Spacewatch	·	2.6 km	MPC · JPL
273090	2006 EX_{46}	—	March 4, 2006	Kitt Peak	Spacewatch	·	2.3 km	MPC · JPL
273091	2006 EX_{47}	—	March 4, 2006	Kitt Peak	Spacewatch	·	1.9 km	MPC · JPL
273092	2006 ES_{58}	—	March 5, 2006	Kitt Peak	Spacewatch	DOR	3.8 km	MPC · JPL
273093	2006 ET_{58}	—	March 5, 2006	Kitt Peak	Spacewatch	·	2.9 km	MPC · JPL
273094	2006 ES_{63}	—	March 5, 2006	Kitt Peak	Spacewatch	·	3.9 km	MPC · JPL
273095	2006 EG_{66}	—	March 5, 2006	Kitt Peak	Spacewatch	·	3.1 km	MPC · JPL
273096	2006 ET_{71}	—	March 4, 2006	Kitt Peak	Spacewatch	·	1.8 km	MPC · JPL
273097	2006 FE_{1}	—	March 21, 2006	Mount Lemmon	Mount Lemmon Survey	·	3.1 km	MPC · JPL
273098	2006 FF_{5}	—	March 23, 2006	Mount Lemmon	Mount Lemmon Survey	·	3.0 km	MPC · JPL
273099	2006 FH_{13}	—	March 23, 2006	Kitt Peak	Spacewatch	·	4.1 km	MPC · JPL
273100	2006 FK_{13}	—	March 23, 2006	Kitt Peak	Spacewatch	·	2.6 km	MPC · JPL

== 273101–273200 ==
back to top

Designation			Discovery			Properties		Ref
Permanent	Provisional	Named after	Date	Site	Discoverer(s)	Category	Diam.	Ref
273101	2006 FO_{15}	—	March 23, 2006	Mount Lemmon	Mount Lemmon Survey	·	2.3 km	MPC · JPL
273102	2006 FC_{16}	—	March 23, 2006	Mount Lemmon	Mount Lemmon Survey	·	2.5 km	MPC · JPL
273103	2006 FK_{20}	—	March 23, 2006	Mount Lemmon	Mount Lemmon Survey	·	2.6 km	MPC · JPL
273104	2006 FP_{20}	—	March 23, 2006	Kitt Peak	Spacewatch	THM	2.8 km	MPC · JPL
273105	2006 FL_{23}	—	March 24, 2006	Kitt Peak	Spacewatch	·	4.1 km	MPC · JPL
273106	2006 FM_{26}	—	March 24, 2006	Mount Lemmon	Mount Lemmon Survey	EOS	2.4 km	MPC · JPL
273107	2006 FO_{26}	—	March 24, 2006	Mount Lemmon	Mount Lemmon Survey	·	2.9 km	MPC · JPL
273108	2006 FP_{28}	—	March 24, 2006	Mount Lemmon	Mount Lemmon Survey	·	3.3 km	MPC · JPL
273109	2006 FX_{28}	—	March 24, 2006	Mount Lemmon	Mount Lemmon Survey	EOS	3.7 km	MPC · JPL
273110	2006 FY_{29}	—	March 24, 2006	Mount Lemmon	Mount Lemmon Survey	THM	2.5 km	MPC · JPL
273111	2006 FC_{30}	—	March 24, 2006	Mount Lemmon	Mount Lemmon Survey	THM	2.8 km	MPC · JPL
273112	2006 FC_{32}	—	March 25, 2006	Kitt Peak	Spacewatch	·	3.5 km	MPC · JPL
273113	2006 FS_{32}	—	March 25, 2006	Kitt Peak	Spacewatch	·	2.9 km	MPC · JPL
273114	2006 FD_{35}	—	March 22, 2006	Catalina	CSS	·	5.4 km	MPC · JPL
273115	2006 FH_{39}	—	March 24, 2006	Kitt Peak	Spacewatch	AGN	2.0 km	MPC · JPL
273116	2006 FC_{40}	—	March 25, 2006	Kitt Peak	Spacewatch	EOS	2.2 km	MPC · JPL
273117	2006 FP_{41}	—	March 26, 2006	Mount Lemmon	Mount Lemmon Survey	·	3.0 km	MPC · JPL
273118	2006 FD_{43}	—	March 29, 2006	Kitt Peak	Spacewatch	·	2.5 km	MPC · JPL
273119	2006 FO_{53}	—	March 25, 2006	Kitt Peak	Spacewatch	·	3.4 km	MPC · JPL
273120	2006 FX_{53}	—	March 25, 2006	Kitt Peak	Spacewatch	·	2.0 km	MPC · JPL
273121	2006 FD_{54}	—	March 23, 2006	Mount Lemmon	Mount Lemmon Survey	EOS	2.0 km	MPC · JPL
273122	2006 FL_{54}	—	March 24, 2006	Kitt Peak	Spacewatch	·	3.2 km	MPC · JPL
273123	2006 GL_{2}	—	April 2, 2006	Kitt Peak	Spacewatch	·	2.1 km	MPC · JPL
273124	2006 GH_{8}	—	April 2, 2006	Kitt Peak	Spacewatch	·	3.7 km	MPC · JPL
273125	2006 GR_{11}	—	April 2, 2006	Kitt Peak	Spacewatch	EOS	2.5 km	MPC · JPL
273126	2006 GS_{16}	—	April 2, 2006	Kitt Peak	Spacewatch	·	3.5 km	MPC · JPL
273127	2006 GL_{17}	—	April 2, 2006	Kitt Peak	Spacewatch	·	3.2 km	MPC · JPL
273128	2006 GX_{18}	—	April 2, 2006	Kitt Peak	Spacewatch	·	2.1 km	MPC · JPL
273129	2006 GH_{21}	—	April 2, 2006	Mount Lemmon	Mount Lemmon Survey	KOR	1.7 km	MPC · JPL
273130	2006 GY_{25}	—	April 2, 2006	Kitt Peak	Spacewatch	·	2.5 km	MPC · JPL
273131	2006 GS_{30}	—	April 2, 2006	Mount Lemmon	Mount Lemmon Survey	·	2.7 km	MPC · JPL
273132	2006 GL_{32}	—	April 7, 2006	Kitt Peak	Spacewatch	·	3.5 km	MPC · JPL
273133	2006 GV_{42}	—	April 8, 2006	Catalina	CSS	H	570 m	MPC · JPL
273134	2006 GR_{46}	—	April 8, 2006	Kitt Peak	Spacewatch	·	5.5 km	MPC · JPL
273135	2006 GF_{47}	—	April 9, 2006	Kitt Peak	Spacewatch	·	3.5 km	MPC · JPL
273136	2006 GW_{48}	—	April 9, 2006	Kitt Peak	Spacewatch	·	3.2 km	MPC · JPL
273137	2006 GF_{49}	—	April 2, 2006	Anderson Mesa	LONEOS	·	5.0 km	MPC · JPL
273138	2006 HR	—	April 18, 2006	Kitt Peak	Spacewatch	KOR	1.6 km	MPC · JPL
273139	2006 HZ_{7}	—	April 18, 2006	Kitt Peak	Spacewatch	·	3.0 km	MPC · JPL
273140	2006 HB_{13}	—	April 19, 2006	Kitt Peak	Spacewatch	·	3.3 km	MPC · JPL
273141	2006 HO_{13}	—	April 19, 2006	Palomar	NEAT	·	3.5 km	MPC · JPL
273142	2006 HZ_{13}	—	April 19, 2006	Mount Lemmon	Mount Lemmon Survey	·	2.6 km	MPC · JPL
273143	2006 HM_{19}	—	April 18, 2006	Kitt Peak	Spacewatch	·	2.6 km	MPC · JPL
273144	2006 HH_{20}	—	April 19, 2006	Mount Lemmon	Mount Lemmon Survey	·	3.3 km	MPC · JPL
273145	2006 HW_{21}	—	April 20, 2006	Kitt Peak	Spacewatch	·	2.7 km	MPC · JPL
273146	2006 HV_{23}	—	April 20, 2006	Kitt Peak	Spacewatch	·	2.0 km	MPC · JPL
273147	2006 HO_{28}	—	April 20, 2006	Kitt Peak	Spacewatch	LUT	5.2 km	MPC · JPL
273148	2006 HL_{29}	—	April 21, 2006	Catalina	CSS	·	2.6 km	MPC · JPL
273149	2006 HN_{29}	—	April 23, 2006	Socorro	LINEAR	·	6.0 km	MPC · JPL
273150	2006 HW_{31}	—	April 19, 2006	Kitt Peak	Spacewatch	·	3.9 km	MPC · JPL
273151	2006 HA_{35}	—	April 19, 2006	Mount Lemmon	Mount Lemmon Survey	·	3.2 km	MPC · JPL
273152	2006 HN_{35}	—	April 19, 2006	Catalina	CSS	·	4.2 km	MPC · JPL
273153	2006 HY_{36}	—	April 21, 2006	Kitt Peak	Spacewatch	·	3.8 km	MPC · JPL
273154	2006 HJ_{38}	—	April 21, 2006	Kitt Peak	Spacewatch	EOS	1.9 km	MPC · JPL
273155	2006 HW_{40}	—	April 21, 2006	Kitt Peak	Spacewatch	·	6.0 km	MPC · JPL
273156	2006 HY_{40}	—	April 21, 2006	Kitt Peak	Spacewatch	·	3.7 km	MPC · JPL
273157	2006 HO_{43}	—	April 24, 2006	Mount Lemmon	Mount Lemmon Survey	EOS	2.2 km	MPC · JPL
273158	2006 HV_{45}	—	April 25, 2006	Kitt Peak	Spacewatch	·	2.3 km	MPC · JPL
273159	2006 HJ_{54}	—	April 20, 2006	Catalina	CSS	·	3.8 km	MPC · JPL
273160	2006 HX_{54}	—	April 21, 2006	Catalina	CSS	·	4.1 km	MPC · JPL
273161	2006 HL_{59}	—	April 22, 2006	Siding Spring	SSS	·	4.4 km	MPC · JPL
273162	2006 HN_{60}	—	April 26, 2006	Anderson Mesa	LONEOS	EUP	6.8 km	MPC · JPL
273163	2006 HX_{60}	—	April 28, 2006	Socorro	LINEAR	·	5.0 km	MPC · JPL
273164	2006 HB_{61}	—	April 29, 2006	Catalina	CSS	·	4.4 km	MPC · JPL
273165	2006 HO_{61}	—	April 24, 2006	Kitt Peak	Spacewatch	·	3.2 km	MPC · JPL
273166	2006 HA_{62}	—	April 24, 2006	Kitt Peak	Spacewatch	·	1.8 km	MPC · JPL
273167	2006 HB_{63}	—	April 24, 2006	Kitt Peak	Spacewatch	EOS	2.6 km	MPC · JPL
273168	2006 HH_{64}	—	April 24, 2006	Kitt Peak	Spacewatch	·	2.8 km	MPC · JPL
273169	2006 HS_{67}	—	April 24, 2006	Mount Lemmon	Mount Lemmon Survey	THM	2.5 km	MPC · JPL
273170	2006 HW_{70}	—	April 25, 2006	Kitt Peak	Spacewatch	·	2.9 km	MPC · JPL
273171	2006 HO_{71}	—	April 25, 2006	Kitt Peak	Spacewatch	·	3.5 km	MPC · JPL
273172	2006 HM_{74}	—	April 25, 2006	Kitt Peak	Spacewatch	·	2.7 km	MPC · JPL
273173	2006 HQ_{74}	—	April 25, 2006	Kitt Peak	Spacewatch	EOS	2.5 km	MPC · JPL
273174	2006 HQ_{75}	—	April 25, 2006	Kitt Peak	Spacewatch	LIX	4.2 km	MPC · JPL
273175	2006 HW_{75}	—	April 25, 2006	Kitt Peak	Spacewatch	(31811)	3.7 km	MPC · JPL
273176	2006 HX_{79}	—	April 26, 2006	Kitt Peak	Spacewatch	·	2.3 km	MPC · JPL
273177	2006 HX_{80}	—	April 26, 2006	Kitt Peak	Spacewatch	·	4.8 km	MPC · JPL
273178	2006 HJ_{82}	—	April 26, 2006	Kitt Peak	Spacewatch	TIR	4.6 km	MPC · JPL
273179	2006 HZ_{84}	—	April 26, 2006	Kitt Peak	Spacewatch	·	5.8 km	MPC · JPL
273180	2006 HO_{91}	—	April 29, 2006	Kitt Peak	Spacewatch	·	3.7 km	MPC · JPL
273181	2006 HU_{92}	—	April 29, 2006	Kitt Peak	Spacewatch	·	3.3 km	MPC · JPL
273182	2006 HS_{93}	—	April 29, 2006	Kitt Peak	Spacewatch	·	4.7 km	MPC · JPL
273183	2006 HS_{94}	—	April 30, 2006	Kitt Peak	Spacewatch	·	1.6 km	MPC · JPL
273184	2006 HW_{94}	—	April 30, 2006	Kitt Peak	Spacewatch	·	2.3 km	MPC · JPL
273185	2006 HO_{99}	—	April 30, 2006	Kitt Peak	Spacewatch	H	820 m	MPC · JPL
273186	2006 HH_{101}	—	April 30, 2006	Kitt Peak	Spacewatch	·	3.7 km	MPC · JPL
273187	2006 HK_{101}	—	April 30, 2006	Kitt Peak	Spacewatch	·	3.7 km	MPC · JPL
273188	2006 HD_{106}	—	April 30, 2006	Kitt Peak	Spacewatch	·	3.7 km	MPC · JPL
273189	2006 HE_{108}	—	April 30, 2006	Kitt Peak	Spacewatch	·	4.4 km	MPC · JPL
273190	2006 HP_{110}	—	April 30, 2006	Catalina	CSS	·	3.2 km	MPC · JPL
273191	2006 HM_{116}	—	April 26, 2006	Kitt Peak	Spacewatch	HYG	2.9 km	MPC · JPL
273192	2006 HS_{119}	—	April 30, 2006	Kitt Peak	Spacewatch	·	2.1 km	MPC · JPL
273193	2006 HE_{121}	—	April 30, 2006	Kitt Peak	Spacewatch	·	2.9 km	MPC · JPL
273194	2006 HY_{130}	—	April 26, 2006	Cerro Tololo	M. W. Buie	·	3.2 km	MPC · JPL
273195	2006 HG_{151}	—	April 30, 2006	Anderson Mesa	LONEOS	·	3.9 km	MPC · JPL
273196	2006 HO_{152}	—	April 24, 2006	Mount Lemmon	Mount Lemmon Survey	·	2.7 km	MPC · JPL
273197	2006 JQ	—	May 2, 2006	Catalina	CSS	H	780 m	MPC · JPL
273198	2006 JK_{4}	—	May 2, 2006	Mount Lemmon	Mount Lemmon Survey	·	2.6 km	MPC · JPL
273199	2006 JA_{6}	—	May 3, 2006	Mount Lemmon	Mount Lemmon Survey	H	700 m	MPC · JPL
273200	2006 JE_{9}	—	May 1, 2006	Kitt Peak	Spacewatch	·	3.8 km	MPC · JPL

== 273201–273300 ==
back to top

Designation			Discovery			Properties		Ref
Permanent	Provisional	Named after	Date	Site	Discoverer(s)	Category	Diam.	Ref
273201	2006 JA_{11}	—	May 1, 2006	Kitt Peak	Spacewatch	·	3.5 km	MPC · JPL
273202	2006 JO_{12}	—	May 1, 2006	Kitt Peak	Spacewatch	·	4.7 km	MPC · JPL
273203	2006 JU_{13}	—	May 3, 2006	Kitt Peak	Spacewatch	·	4.5 km	MPC · JPL
273204	2006 JB_{15}	—	May 2, 2006	Mount Lemmon	Mount Lemmon Survey	KOR	1.7 km	MPC · JPL
273205	2006 JK_{15}	—	May 2, 2006	Mount Lemmon	Mount Lemmon Survey	·	3.3 km	MPC · JPL
273206	2006 JL_{16}	—	May 2, 2006	Kitt Peak	Spacewatch	EOS	1.9 km	MPC · JPL
273207	2006 JM_{16}	—	May 2, 2006	Kitt Peak	Spacewatch	·	4.9 km	MPC · JPL
273208	2006 JB_{17}	—	May 2, 2006	Kitt Peak	Spacewatch	·	3.3 km	MPC · JPL
273209	2006 JE_{18}	—	May 2, 2006	Mount Lemmon	Mount Lemmon Survey	EOS	2.4 km	MPC · JPL
273210	2006 JQ_{20}	—	May 2, 2006	Kitt Peak	Spacewatch	·	2.6 km	MPC · JPL
273211	2006 JG_{24}	—	May 4, 2006	Mount Lemmon	Mount Lemmon Survey	·	3.7 km	MPC · JPL
273212	2006 JY_{28}	—	May 3, 2006	Kitt Peak	Spacewatch	·	3.9 km	MPC · JPL
273213	2006 JL_{29}	—	May 3, 2006	Kitt Peak	Spacewatch	KOR	1.9 km	MPC · JPL
273214	2006 JP_{31}	—	May 3, 2006	Kitt Peak	Spacewatch	·	2.7 km	MPC · JPL
273215	2006 JD_{35}	—	May 4, 2006	Kitt Peak	Spacewatch	·	2.6 km	MPC · JPL
273216	2006 JH_{36}	—	May 4, 2006	Kitt Peak	Spacewatch	·	3.9 km	MPC · JPL
273217	2006 JJ_{37}	—	May 5, 2006	Kitt Peak	Spacewatch	BRA	1.8 km	MPC · JPL
273218	2006 JS_{37}	—	May 5, 2006	Mount Lemmon	Mount Lemmon Survey	·	3.6 km	MPC · JPL
273219	2006 JZ_{37}	—	May 5, 2006	Anderson Mesa	LONEOS	TIR	4.6 km	MPC · JPL
273220	2006 JV_{40}	—	May 7, 2006	Kitt Peak	Spacewatch	·	4.4 km	MPC · JPL
273221	2006 JB_{41}	—	May 7, 2006	Kitt Peak	Spacewatch	·	3.9 km	MPC · JPL
273222	2006 JM_{47}	—	May 1, 2006	Kitt Peak	Spacewatch	·	3.0 km	MPC · JPL
273223	2006 JZ_{51}	—	May 3, 2006	Kitt Peak	Spacewatch	·	3.2 km	MPC · JPL
273224	2006 JJ_{54}	—	May 8, 2006	Mount Lemmon	Mount Lemmon Survey	TIR	4.0 km	MPC · JPL
273225	2006 JE_{55}	—	May 9, 2006	Mount Lemmon	Mount Lemmon Survey	·	3.5 km	MPC · JPL
273226	2006 JX_{55}	—	May 1, 2006	Catalina	CSS	·	4.8 km	MPC · JPL
273227	2006 JB_{61}	—	May 2, 2006	Kitt Peak	M. W. Buie	·	3.0 km	MPC · JPL
273228	2006 JW_{66}	—	May 1, 2006	Kitt Peak	M. W. Buie	·	3.1 km	MPC · JPL
273229	2006 JY_{67}	—	May 1, 2006	Kitt Peak	M. W. Buie	EOS	2.3 km	MPC · JPL
273230 de Bruyn	2006 JU_{72}	de Bruyn	May 1, 2006	Mauna Kea	P. A. Wiegert	·	2.6 km	MPC · JPL
273231	2006 JU_{80}	—	May 1, 2006	Kitt Peak	Spacewatch	·	3.1 km	MPC · JPL
273232	2006 KN	—	May 16, 2006	Palomar	NEAT	·	4.5 km	MPC · JPL
273233	2006 KC_{1}	—	May 20, 2006	Mayhill	Lowe, A.	LIX	5.7 km	MPC · JPL
273234	2006 KC_{12}	—	May 20, 2006	Kitt Peak	Spacewatch	slow	5.0 km	MPC · JPL
273235	2006 KQ_{12}	—	May 20, 2006	Kitt Peak	Spacewatch	·	3.5 km	MPC · JPL
273236	2006 KT_{14}	—	May 20, 2006	Kitt Peak	Spacewatch	THM	2.7 km	MPC · JPL
273237	2006 KN_{20}	—	May 20, 2006	Anderson Mesa	LONEOS	·	5.1 km	MPC · JPL
273238	2006 KX_{22}	—	May 20, 2006	Kitt Peak	Spacewatch	AEG	4.4 km	MPC · JPL
273239	2006 KG_{26}	—	May 20, 2006	Kitt Peak	Spacewatch	CYB	6.4 km	MPC · JPL
273240	2006 KR_{26}	—	May 20, 2006	Kitt Peak	Spacewatch	·	4.8 km	MPC · JPL
273241	2006 KH_{33}	—	May 20, 2006	Kitt Peak	Spacewatch	·	7.2 km	MPC · JPL
273242	2006 KJ_{38}	—	May 19, 2006	Catalina	CSS	·	4.6 km	MPC · JPL
273243	2006 KT_{40}	—	May 19, 2006	Mount Lemmon	Mount Lemmon Survey	·	3.6 km	MPC · JPL
273244	2006 KG_{43}	—	May 20, 2006	Kitt Peak	Spacewatch	HYG	3.1 km	MPC · JPL
273245	2006 KS_{47}	—	May 21, 2006	Kitt Peak	Spacewatch	·	3.7 km	MPC · JPL
273246	2006 KZ_{49}	—	May 21, 2006	Kitt Peak	Spacewatch	·	4.5 km	MPC · JPL
273247	2006 KP_{56}	—	May 22, 2006	Kitt Peak	Spacewatch	·	4.3 km	MPC · JPL
273248	2006 KM_{66}	—	May 24, 2006	Mount Lemmon	Mount Lemmon Survey	·	3.0 km	MPC · JPL
273249	2006 KF_{67}	—	May 24, 2006	Mount Lemmon	Mount Lemmon Survey	·	4.2 km	MPC · JPL
273250	2006 KA_{73}	—	May 23, 2006	Kitt Peak	Spacewatch	EOS	2.2 km	MPC · JPL
273251	2006 KQ_{79}	—	May 25, 2006	Mount Lemmon	Mount Lemmon Survey	·	5.0 km	MPC · JPL
273252	2006 KO_{87}	—	May 24, 2006	Kitt Peak	Spacewatch	·	2.1 km	MPC · JPL
273253	2006 KR_{94}	—	May 25, 2006	Kitt Peak	Spacewatch	·	3.0 km	MPC · JPL
273254	2006 KU_{102}	—	May 29, 2006	Kitt Peak	Spacewatch	·	5.0 km	MPC · JPL
273255	2006 KB_{109}	—	May 31, 2006	Mount Lemmon	Mount Lemmon Survey	·	2.7 km	MPC · JPL
273256	2006 KP_{111}	—	May 31, 2006	Mount Lemmon	Mount Lemmon Survey	EOS	2.7 km	MPC · JPL
273257	2006 KO_{115}	—	May 29, 2006	Kitt Peak	Spacewatch	·	1.9 km	MPC · JPL
273258	2006 KS_{115}	—	May 29, 2006	Kitt Peak	Spacewatch	·	4.1 km	MPC · JPL
273259	2006 KV_{116}	—	May 29, 2006	Kitt Peak	Spacewatch	·	3.4 km	MPC · JPL
273260	2006 KB_{117}	—	May 29, 2006	Kitt Peak	Spacewatch	·	4.3 km	MPC · JPL
273261	2006 KK_{118}	—	May 29, 2006	Reedy Creek	J. Broughton	·	4.2 km	MPC · JPL
273262 Cottam	2006 KJ_{142}	Cottam	May 25, 2006	Mauna Kea	P. A. Wiegert	·	3.9 km	MPC · JPL
273263	2006 KK_{143}	—	May 18, 2006	Palomar	NEAT	EOS	2.8 km	MPC · JPL
273264	2006 LW	—	June 3, 2006	Mount Lemmon	Mount Lemmon Survey	·	630 m	MPC · JPL
273265	2006 LU_{2}	—	June 5, 2006	Socorro	LINEAR	·	4.9 km	MPC · JPL
273266	2006 LD_{6}	—	June 4, 2006	Mount Lemmon	Mount Lemmon Survey	·	1.1 km	MPC · JPL
273267	2006 MS	—	June 16, 2006	Kitt Peak	Spacewatch	·	3.8 km	MPC · JPL
273268	2006 MM_{1}	—	June 18, 2006	Kitt Peak	Spacewatch	EOS	2.2 km	MPC · JPL
273269	2006 MN_{2}	—	June 16, 2006	Kitt Peak	Spacewatch	·	2.7 km	MPC · JPL
273270	2006 MZ_{5}	—	June 18, 2006	Kitt Peak	Spacewatch	·	4.6 km	MPC · JPL
273271	2006 OP	—	July 17, 2006	Reedy Creek	J. Broughton	EUP	6.0 km	MPC · JPL
273272	2006 OU	—	July 17, 2006	Lulin	LUSS	·	1.5 km	MPC · JPL
273273 Piwowarski	2006 OR_{9}	Piwowarski	July 24, 2006	Winterthur	M. Griesser	T_{j} (2.89)	3.7 km	MPC · JPL
273274	2006 PV_{35}	—	August 12, 2006	Palomar	NEAT	ADE	2.1 km	MPC · JPL
273275	2006 PQ_{36}	—	August 12, 2006	Palomar	NEAT	H	950 m	MPC · JPL
273276	2006 QG_{64}	—	August 25, 2006	Socorro	LINEAR	·	1.1 km	MPC · JPL
273277	2006 QK_{73}	—	August 21, 2006	Kitt Peak	Spacewatch	·	1.5 km	MPC · JPL
273278	2006 QD_{90}	—	August 28, 2006	Catalina	CSS	·	1.1 km	MPC · JPL
273279	2006 QD_{119}	—	August 28, 2006	Socorro	LINEAR	·	700 m	MPC · JPL
273280	2006 QH_{155}	—	August 18, 2006	Palomar	NEAT	·	750 m	MPC · JPL
273281	2006 QD_{166}	—	August 29, 2006	Catalina	CSS	·	1.5 km	MPC · JPL
273282	2006 QR_{167}	—	August 30, 2006	Socorro	LINEAR	·	1.2 km	MPC · JPL
273283	2006 RL_{18}	—	September 14, 2006	Catalina	CSS	3:2 · SHU	8.2 km	MPC · JPL
273284	2006 RU_{24}	—	September 14, 2006	Kitt Peak	Spacewatch	·	970 m	MPC · JPL
273285	2006 RD_{58}	—	September 15, 2006	Kitt Peak	Spacewatch	·	1.5 km	MPC · JPL
273286	2006 RV_{66}	—	September 14, 2006	Kitt Peak	Spacewatch	·	950 m	MPC · JPL
273287	2006 RE_{86}	—	September 15, 2006	Kitt Peak	Spacewatch	·	630 m	MPC · JPL
273288	2006 RY_{88}	—	September 15, 2006	Kitt Peak	Spacewatch	·	630 m	MPC · JPL
273289	2006 RR_{101}	—	September 14, 2006	Catalina	CSS	·	1.5 km	MPC · JPL
273290	2006 SN_{12}	—	September 16, 2006	Anderson Mesa	LONEOS	·	880 m	MPC · JPL
273291	2006 SJ_{16}	—	September 17, 2006	Kitt Peak	Spacewatch	·	4.0 km	MPC · JPL
273292	2006 SP_{36}	—	September 17, 2006	Anderson Mesa	LONEOS	·	1.1 km	MPC · JPL
273293	2006 SK_{39}	—	September 18, 2006	Catalina	CSS	(2076)	980 m	MPC · JPL
273294	2006 SS_{70}	—	September 19, 2006	Kitt Peak	Spacewatch	·	640 m	MPC · JPL
273295	2006 SO_{87}	—	September 18, 2006	Kitt Peak	Spacewatch	·	780 m	MPC · JPL
273296	2006 SU_{90}	—	September 18, 2006	Kitt Peak	Spacewatch	NYS	830 m	MPC · JPL
273297	2006 SS_{92}	—	September 18, 2006	Kitt Peak	Spacewatch	·	750 m	MPC · JPL
273298	2006 SD_{100}	—	September 19, 2006	Kitt Peak	Spacewatch	·	1.1 km	MPC · JPL
273299	2006 SR_{106}	—	September 19, 2006	Kitt Peak	Spacewatch	·	720 m	MPC · JPL
273300	2006 SS_{108}	—	September 19, 2006	Catalina	CSS	·	1.2 km	MPC · JPL

== 273301–273400 ==
back to top

Designation			Discovery			Properties		Ref
Permanent	Provisional	Named after	Date	Site	Discoverer(s)	Category	Diam.	Ref
273301	2006 SG_{112}	—	September 23, 2006	Kitt Peak	Spacewatch	·	820 m	MPC · JPL
273302	2006 SS_{118}	—	September 24, 2006	Junk Bond	D. Healy	·	1.2 km	MPC · JPL
273303	2006 SL_{141}	—	September 25, 2006	Anderson Mesa	LONEOS	·	1.1 km	MPC · JPL
273304	2006 SQ_{148}	—	September 19, 2006	Kitt Peak	Spacewatch	·	610 m	MPC · JPL
273305	2006 SN_{183}	—	September 25, 2006	Mount Lemmon	Mount Lemmon Survey	·	740 m	MPC · JPL
273306	2006 SZ_{186}	—	September 25, 2006	Mount Lemmon	Mount Lemmon Survey	·	1.0 km	MPC · JPL
273307	2006 SL_{201}	—	September 24, 2006	Kitt Peak	Spacewatch	·	640 m	MPC · JPL
273308	2006 ST_{213}	—	September 27, 2006	Socorro	LINEAR	·	1.0 km	MPC · JPL
273309	2006 ST_{258}	—	September 26, 2006	Kitt Peak	Spacewatch	·	680 m	MPC · JPL
273310	2006 SG_{267}	—	September 26, 2006	Kitt Peak	Spacewatch	·	940 m	MPC · JPL
273311	2006 SM_{267}	—	September 26, 2006	Kitt Peak	Spacewatch	·	720 m	MPC · JPL
273312	2006 SN_{274}	—	September 27, 2006	Mount Lemmon	Mount Lemmon Survey	·	820 m	MPC · JPL
273313	2006 SX_{274}	—	September 27, 2006	Mount Lemmon	Mount Lemmon Survey	·	1.3 km	MPC · JPL
273314	2006 SS_{355}	—	September 30, 2006	Catalina	CSS	·	590 m	MPC · JPL
273315	2006 ST_{356}	—	September 30, 2006	Catalina	CSS	·	1.1 km	MPC · JPL
273316	2006 SD_{391}	—	September 17, 2006	Kitt Peak	Spacewatch	NYS	890 m	MPC · JPL
273317	2006 SP_{404}	—	September 30, 2006	Mount Lemmon	Mount Lemmon Survey	·	760 m	MPC · JPL
273318	2006 SR_{409}	—	September 18, 2006	Kitt Peak	Spacewatch	·	770 m	MPC · JPL
273319	2006 TW_{2}	—	October 2, 2006	Mount Lemmon	Mount Lemmon Survey	·	1.0 km	MPC · JPL
273320	2006 TU_{20}	—	October 11, 2006	Kitt Peak	Spacewatch	·	1.1 km	MPC · JPL
273321	2006 TZ_{20}	—	October 11, 2006	Kitt Peak	Spacewatch	·	1.1 km	MPC · JPL
273322	2006 TQ_{21}	—	October 11, 2006	Palomar	NEAT	·	940 m	MPC · JPL
273323	2006 TM_{22}	—	October 11, 2006	Kitt Peak	Spacewatch	·	840 m	MPC · JPL
273324	2006 TV_{28}	—	October 12, 2006	Kitt Peak	Spacewatch	·	660 m	MPC · JPL
273325	2006 TA_{30}	—	October 12, 2006	Kitt Peak	Spacewatch	·	1.4 km	MPC · JPL
273326	2006 TF_{44}	—	October 12, 2006	Kitt Peak	Spacewatch	·	2.2 km	MPC · JPL
273327	2006 TY_{48}	—	October 12, 2006	Kitt Peak	Spacewatch	·	760 m	MPC · JPL
273328	2006 TS_{51}	—	October 12, 2006	Kitt Peak	Spacewatch	MAS	820 m	MPC · JPL
273329	2006 TS_{54}	—	October 12, 2006	Palomar	NEAT	fast	1.2 km	MPC · JPL
273330	2006 TO_{57}	—	October 15, 2006	Kitt Peak	Spacewatch	(2076) · fast	890 m	MPC · JPL
273331	2006 TM_{62}	—	October 10, 2006	Palomar	NEAT	BAP	1.1 km	MPC · JPL
273332	2006 TO_{63}	—	October 10, 2006	Palomar	NEAT	·	920 m	MPC · JPL
273333	2006 TU_{69}	—	October 11, 2006	Palomar	NEAT	·	990 m	MPC · JPL
273334	2006 TK_{70}	—	October 11, 2006	Palomar	NEAT	·	910 m	MPC · JPL
273335	2006 TU_{72}	—	October 11, 2006	Palomar	NEAT	·	1.1 km	MPC · JPL
273336	2006 TA_{74}	—	October 11, 2006	Palomar	NEAT	·	1.1 km	MPC · JPL
273337	2006 TJ_{79}	—	October 12, 2006	Kitt Peak	Spacewatch	·	760 m	MPC · JPL
273338	2006 TB_{80}	—	October 13, 2006	Kitt Peak	Spacewatch	·	1.0 km	MPC · JPL
273339	2006 TH_{85}	—	October 13, 2006	Kitt Peak	Spacewatch	·	1.2 km	MPC · JPL
273340	2006 TG_{92}	—	October 13, 2006	Kitt Peak	Spacewatch	·	840 m	MPC · JPL
273341	2006 TU_{101}	—	October 15, 2006	Kitt Peak	Spacewatch	MAS	690 m	MPC · JPL
273342	2006 TQ_{106}	—	October 15, 2006	Catalina	CSS	·	830 m	MPC · JPL
273343	2006 TC_{107}	—	October 13, 2006	Lulin	Lin, C.-S., Q. Ye	·	1.3 km	MPC · JPL
273344	2006 UU_{14}	—	October 17, 2006	Mount Lemmon	Mount Lemmon Survey	(5)	1.5 km	MPC · JPL
273345	2006 UD_{30}	—	October 16, 2006	Kitt Peak	Spacewatch	·	1.0 km	MPC · JPL
273346	2006 UC_{36}	—	October 16, 2006	Kitt Peak	Spacewatch	·	570 m	MPC · JPL
273347	2006 UW_{46}	—	October 16, 2006	Kitt Peak	Spacewatch	·	680 m	MPC · JPL
273348	2006 UJ_{61}	—	October 19, 2006	Mount Lemmon	Mount Lemmon Survey	·	1.6 km	MPC · JPL
273349	2006 UN_{61}	—	October 19, 2006	Catalina	CSS	·	1.1 km	MPC · JPL
273350	2006 UJ_{66}	—	October 16, 2006	Mount Lemmon	Mount Lemmon Survey	·	650 m	MPC · JPL
273351	2006 UN_{66}	—	October 16, 2006	Kitt Peak	Spacewatch	·	1.4 km	MPC · JPL
273352	2006 UK_{69}	—	October 16, 2006	Catalina	CSS	·	1.6 km	MPC · JPL
273353	2006 UH_{88}	—	October 17, 2006	Kitt Peak	Spacewatch	·	910 m	MPC · JPL
273354	2006 US_{89}	—	October 17, 2006	Kitt Peak	Spacewatch	NYS	1.2 km	MPC · JPL
273355	2006 UN_{90}	—	October 17, 2006	Kitt Peak	Spacewatch	NYS	1.1 km	MPC · JPL
273356	2006 UB_{137}	—	October 19, 2006	Catalina	CSS	·	810 m	MPC · JPL
273357	2006 UG_{145}	—	October 20, 2006	Kitt Peak	Spacewatch	·	1.9 km	MPC · JPL
273358	2006 UQ_{173}	—	October 22, 2006	Mount Lemmon	Mount Lemmon Survey	MAS	660 m	MPC · JPL
273359	2006 UM_{174}	—	October 19, 2006	Catalina	CSS	·	790 m	MPC · JPL
273360	2006 UG_{184}	—	October 19, 2006	Catalina	CSS	·	1.6 km	MPC · JPL
273361	2006 UE_{190}	—	October 19, 2006	Catalina	CSS	·	1.1 km	MPC · JPL
273362	2006 UY_{192}	—	October 19, 2006	Catalina	CSS	·	770 m	MPC · JPL
273363	2006 UD_{193}	—	October 19, 2006	Catalina	CSS	·	1.2 km	MPC · JPL
273364	2006 UU_{210}	—	October 23, 2006	Kitt Peak	Spacewatch	·	1.5 km	MPC · JPL
273365	2006 UP_{215}	—	October 23, 2006	Catalina	CSS	·	1.2 km	MPC · JPL
273366	2006 UY_{219}	—	October 16, 2006	Catalina	CSS	EUN	1.1 km	MPC · JPL
273367	2006 UN_{224}	—	October 19, 2006	Mount Lemmon	Mount Lemmon Survey	(2076)	930 m	MPC · JPL
273368	2006 UZ_{228}	—	October 20, 2006	Palomar	NEAT	·	810 m	MPC · JPL
273369	2006 UA_{231}	—	October 21, 2006	Palomar	NEAT	·	1.9 km	MPC · JPL
273370	2006 UJ_{232}	—	October 21, 2006	Palomar	NEAT	(2076)	850 m	MPC · JPL
273371	2006 UY_{237}	—	October 23, 2006	Kitt Peak	Spacewatch	·	680 m	MPC · JPL
273372	2006 UV_{262}	—	October 29, 2006	Mount Lemmon	Mount Lemmon Survey	·	1.3 km	MPC · JPL
273373	2006 UT_{266}	—	October 27, 2006	Kitt Peak	Spacewatch	MAR	1.2 km	MPC · JPL
273374	2006 UQ_{271}	—	October 27, 2006	Mount Lemmon	Mount Lemmon Survey	·	800 m	MPC · JPL
273375	2006 UG_{275}	—	October 28, 2006	Kitt Peak	Spacewatch	·	680 m	MPC · JPL
273376	2006 UQ_{288}	—	October 29, 2006	La Sagra	OAM	·	730 m	MPC · JPL
273377	2006 UP_{331}	—	October 28, 2006	Mount Lemmon	Mount Lemmon Survey	·	700 m	MPC · JPL
273378	2006 VN_{1}	—	November 2, 2006	Charleston	Astronomical Research Observatory	·	1.2 km	MPC · JPL
273379	2006 VB_{9}	—	November 11, 2006	Catalina	CSS	·	970 m	MPC · JPL
273380	2006 VD_{9}	—	November 11, 2006	Catalina	CSS	·	2.2 km	MPC · JPL
273381	2006 VE_{16}	—	November 9, 2006	Kitt Peak	Spacewatch	·	710 m	MPC · JPL
273382	2006 VF_{29}	—	November 10, 2006	Kitt Peak	Spacewatch	·	1.1 km	MPC · JPL
273383	2006 VZ_{33}	—	November 11, 2006	Catalina	CSS	·	950 m	MPC · JPL
273384	2006 VG_{39}	—	November 12, 2006	Mount Lemmon	Mount Lemmon Survey	·	1.7 km	MPC · JPL
273385	2006 VR_{42}	—	November 12, 2006	Mount Lemmon	Mount Lemmon Survey	·	1.4 km	MPC · JPL
273386	2006 VJ_{44}	—	November 13, 2006	Catalina	CSS	V	920 m	MPC · JPL
273387	2006 VN_{49}	—	November 10, 2006	Kitt Peak	Spacewatch	·	1.1 km	MPC · JPL
273388	2006 VQ_{50}	—	November 10, 2006	Kitt Peak	Spacewatch	·	1.4 km	MPC · JPL
273389	2006 VT_{54}	—	November 11, 2006	Kitt Peak	Spacewatch	·	840 m	MPC · JPL
273390	2006 VN_{55}	—	November 11, 2006	Kitt Peak	Spacewatch	·	670 m	MPC · JPL
273391	2006 VZ_{55}	—	November 11, 2006	Kitt Peak	Spacewatch	·	1.2 km	MPC · JPL
273392	2006 VY_{65}	—	November 11, 2006	Kitt Peak	Spacewatch	·	940 m	MPC · JPL
273393	2006 VR_{96}	—	November 10, 2006	Kitt Peak	Spacewatch	·	770 m	MPC · JPL
273394	2006 VX_{97}	—	November 11, 2006	Kitt Peak	Spacewatch	·	990 m	MPC · JPL
273395	2006 VF_{101}	—	November 1, 2006	Catalina	CSS	NYS	1.1 km	MPC · JPL
273396	2006 VJ_{102}	—	November 12, 2006	Mount Lemmon	Mount Lemmon Survey	·	1.6 km	MPC · JPL
273397	2006 VZ_{104}	—	November 13, 2006	Kitt Peak	Spacewatch	·	850 m	MPC · JPL
273398	2006 VE_{107}	—	November 13, 2006	Kitt Peak	Spacewatch	·	1.8 km	MPC · JPL
273399	2006 VJ_{129}	—	November 15, 2006	Socorro	LINEAR	ERI	1.9 km	MPC · JPL
273400	2006 VG_{134}	—	November 15, 2006	Mount Lemmon	Mount Lemmon Survey	·	940 m	MPC · JPL

== 273401–273500 ==
back to top

Designation			Discovery			Properties		Ref
Permanent	Provisional	Named after	Date	Site	Discoverer(s)	Category	Diam.	Ref
273401	2006 VM_{134}	—	November 15, 2006	Catalina	CSS	NYS	1.5 km	MPC · JPL
273402	2006 VM_{137}	—	November 15, 2006	Kitt Peak	Spacewatch	·	760 m	MPC · JPL
273403	2006 VC_{138}	—	November 15, 2006	Kitt Peak	Spacewatch	·	890 m	MPC · JPL
273404	2006 VN_{139}	—	November 15, 2006	Kitt Peak	Spacewatch	·	900 m	MPC · JPL
273405	2006 VQ_{139}	—	November 15, 2006	Kitt Peak	Spacewatch	·	670 m	MPC · JPL
273406	2006 VM_{146}	—	November 15, 2006	Catalina	CSS	·	990 m	MPC · JPL
273407	2006 VS_{147}	—	November 15, 2006	Kitt Peak	Spacewatch	·	870 m	MPC · JPL
273408	2006 VY_{151}	—	November 9, 2006	Palomar	NEAT	·	1.9 km	MPC · JPL
273409	2006 VG_{153}	—	November 8, 2006	Palomar	NEAT	·	890 m	MPC · JPL
273410	2006 VH_{168}	—	November 1, 2006	Mount Lemmon	Mount Lemmon Survey	·	1.5 km	MPC · JPL
273411	2006 VU_{168}	—	November 2, 2006	Kitt Peak	Spacewatch	·	900 m	MPC · JPL
273412 Eduardomissoni	2006 WF_{2}	Eduardomissoni	November 18, 2006	Vallemare Borbona	V. S. Casulli	·	960 m	MPC · JPL
273413	2006 WO_{4}	—	November 19, 2006	Socorro	LINEAR	·	2.5 km	MPC · JPL
273414	2006 WR_{10}	—	November 16, 2006	Socorro	LINEAR	·	1.2 km	MPC · JPL
273415	2006 WX_{10}	—	November 16, 2006	Socorro	LINEAR	·	810 m	MPC · JPL
273416	2006 WJ_{11}	—	November 16, 2006	Socorro	LINEAR	·	1.1 km	MPC · JPL
273417	2006 WV_{12}	—	November 16, 2006	Mount Lemmon	Mount Lemmon Survey	·	1.4 km	MPC · JPL
273418	2006 WY_{16}	—	November 17, 2006	Kitt Peak	Spacewatch	·	710 m	MPC · JPL
273419	2006 WX_{21}	—	November 17, 2006	Mount Lemmon	Mount Lemmon Survey	·	1.1 km	MPC · JPL
273420	2006 WA_{28}	—	November 22, 2006	7300	W. K. Y. Yeung	·	2.8 km	MPC · JPL
273421	2006 WJ_{36}	—	November 16, 2006	Kitt Peak	Spacewatch	·	660 m	MPC · JPL
273422	2006 WJ_{47}	—	November 16, 2006	Kitt Peak	Spacewatch	·	1.6 km	MPC · JPL
273423	2006 WG_{49}	—	November 16, 2006	Mount Lemmon	Mount Lemmon Survey	·	1.7 km	MPC · JPL
273424	2006 WF_{55}	—	November 16, 2006	Kitt Peak	Spacewatch	·	2.8 km	MPC · JPL
273425	2006 WP_{60}	—	November 17, 2006	Kitt Peak	Spacewatch	·	880 m	MPC · JPL
273426	2006 WQ_{61}	—	November 17, 2006	Catalina	CSS	·	730 m	MPC · JPL
273427	2006 WR_{69}	—	November 17, 2006	Mount Lemmon	Mount Lemmon Survey	·	1.7 km	MPC · JPL
273428	2006 WH_{70}	—	November 18, 2006	Kitt Peak	Spacewatch	·	930 m	MPC · JPL
273429	2006 WB_{76}	—	November 18, 2006	Kitt Peak	Spacewatch	·	1.1 km	MPC · JPL
273430	2006 WW_{103}	—	November 19, 2006	Kitt Peak	Spacewatch	MAS	610 m	MPC · JPL
273431	2006 WA_{104}	—	November 19, 2006	Kitt Peak	Spacewatch	·	930 m	MPC · JPL
273432	2006 WC_{121}	—	November 21, 2006	Mount Lemmon	Mount Lemmon Survey	(2076)	960 m	MPC · JPL
273433	2006 WT_{137}	—	November 19, 2006	Kitt Peak	Spacewatch	·	1.2 km	MPC · JPL
273434	2006 WG_{139}	—	November 19, 2006	Kitt Peak	Spacewatch	·	780 m	MPC · JPL
273435	2006 WT_{143}	—	November 20, 2006	Kitt Peak	Spacewatch	·	790 m	MPC · JPL
273436	2006 WT_{146}	—	November 20, 2006	Kitt Peak	Spacewatch	·	880 m	MPC · JPL
273437	2006 WC_{153}	—	November 21, 2006	Mount Lemmon	Mount Lemmon Survey	MAS	800 m	MPC · JPL
273438	2006 WQ_{153}	—	November 21, 2006	Mount Lemmon	Mount Lemmon Survey	·	1.3 km	MPC · JPL
273439	2006 WA_{159}	—	November 22, 2006	Socorro	LINEAR	·	5.7 km	MPC · JPL
273440	2006 WL_{163}	—	November 23, 2006	Kitt Peak	Spacewatch	·	760 m	MPC · JPL
273441	2006 WE_{165}	—	November 23, 2006	Kitt Peak	Spacewatch	NYS	1.1 km	MPC · JPL
273442	2006 WB_{174}	—	November 23, 2006	Kitt Peak	Spacewatch	·	820 m	MPC · JPL
273443	2006 WW_{178}	—	November 24, 2006	Kitt Peak	Spacewatch	·	1.3 km	MPC · JPL
273444	2006 WL_{184}	—	November 25, 2006	Mount Lemmon	Mount Lemmon Survey	·	2.0 km	MPC · JPL
273445	2006 WM_{190}	—	November 15, 2006	Catalina	CSS	V	980 m	MPC · JPL
273446	2006 WM_{191}	—	November 27, 2006	Catalina	CSS	·	1.3 km	MPC · JPL
273447	2006 WN_{198}	—	November 16, 2006	Kitt Peak	Spacewatch	·	1.5 km	MPC · JPL
273448	2006 XH_{7}	—	December 9, 2006	Kitt Peak	Spacewatch	·	1.0 km	MPC · JPL
273449	2006 XS_{9}	—	December 9, 2006	Kitt Peak	Spacewatch	·	900 m	MPC · JPL
273450	2006 XA_{14}	—	December 10, 2006	Kitt Peak	Spacewatch	·	960 m	MPC · JPL
273451	2006 XP_{14}	—	December 10, 2006	Kitt Peak	Spacewatch	EUN	1.5 km	MPC · JPL
273452	2006 XW_{16}	—	December 10, 2006	Kitt Peak	Spacewatch	·	1.0 km	MPC · JPL
273453	2006 XW_{17}	—	December 10, 2006	Kitt Peak	Spacewatch	NYS	1.1 km	MPC · JPL
273454	2006 XR_{25}	—	December 12, 2006	Mount Lemmon	Mount Lemmon Survey	·	910 m	MPC · JPL
273455	2006 XS_{29}	—	December 13, 2006	Socorro	LINEAR	·	970 m	MPC · JPL
273456	2006 XZ_{34}	—	December 11, 2006	Socorro	LINEAR	·	1.3 km	MPC · JPL
273457	2006 XC_{38}	—	December 11, 2006	Kitt Peak	Spacewatch	NYS	1.4 km	MPC · JPL
273458	2006 XQ_{41}	—	December 12, 2006	Socorro	LINEAR	·	1.6 km	MPC · JPL
273459	2006 XB_{43}	—	December 12, 2006	Mount Lemmon	Mount Lemmon Survey	·	1.1 km	MPC · JPL
273460	2006 XJ_{44}	—	December 13, 2006	Kitt Peak	Spacewatch	·	740 m	MPC · JPL
273461	2006 XX_{44}	—	September 6, 2002	Campo Imperatore	CINEOS	·	1.4 km	MPC · JPL
273462	2006 XM_{45}	—	December 13, 2006	Kitt Peak	Spacewatch	·	950 m	MPC · JPL
273463	2006 XV_{45}	—	December 13, 2006	Catalina	CSS	·	1.9 km	MPC · JPL
273464	2006 XY_{45}	—	December 13, 2006	Kitt Peak	Spacewatch	MAS	780 m	MPC · JPL
273465	2006 XR_{48}	—	December 13, 2006	Kitt Peak	Spacewatch	·	1.1 km	MPC · JPL
273466	2006 XF_{52}	—	December 14, 2006	Socorro	LINEAR	·	1.7 km	MPC · JPL
273467	2006 XF_{56}	—	December 15, 2006	Mount Lemmon	Mount Lemmon Survey	·	1.2 km	MPC · JPL
273468	2006 XL_{65}	—	December 12, 2006	Palomar	NEAT	·	1.2 km	MPC · JPL
273469	2006 XD_{69}	—	December 13, 2006	Mount Lemmon	Mount Lemmon Survey	·	2.4 km	MPC · JPL
273470	2006 XF_{69}	—	December 13, 2006	Mount Lemmon	Mount Lemmon Survey	NYS	1.2 km	MPC · JPL
273471	2006 YK_{2}	—	December 16, 2006	Vallemare Borbona	V. S. Casulli	·	800 m	MPC · JPL
273472	2006 YH_{8}	—	December 20, 2006	Mount Lemmon	Mount Lemmon Survey	·	1.2 km	MPC · JPL
273473	2006 YT_{8}	—	December 20, 2006	Mount Lemmon	Mount Lemmon Survey	(2076)	1.1 km	MPC · JPL
273474	2006 YT_{9}	—	December 21, 2006	Kitt Peak	Spacewatch	·	1.0 km	MPC · JPL
273475	2006 YK_{10}	—	December 21, 2006	Anderson Mesa	LONEOS	·	1.3 km	MPC · JPL
273476	2006 YT_{14}	—	December 22, 2006	Črni Vrh	Mikuž, H.	·	4.2 km	MPC · JPL
273477	2006 YC_{15}	—	December 18, 2006	Socorro	LINEAR	·	1.0 km	MPC · JPL
273478	2006 YN_{16}	—	December 21, 2006	Mount Lemmon	Mount Lemmon Survey	·	1.2 km	MPC · JPL
273479	2006 YK_{17}	—	December 21, 2006	Palomar	NEAT	·	1.9 km	MPC · JPL
273480	2006 YJ_{23}	—	December 21, 2006	Kitt Peak	Spacewatch	·	1.1 km	MPC · JPL
273481	2006 YL_{37}	—	December 21, 2006	Kitt Peak	Spacewatch	·	1.3 km	MPC · JPL
273482	2006 YF_{39}	—	December 21, 2006	Kitt Peak	Spacewatch	·	1.3 km	MPC · JPL
273483	2006 YR_{40}	—	December 22, 2006	Socorro	LINEAR	·	1.7 km	MPC · JPL
273484	2006 YQ_{49}	—	December 29, 2006	Pla D'Arguines	R. Ferrando	·	1.8 km	MPC · JPL
273485	2006 YC_{51}	—	December 23, 2006	Mount Lemmon	Mount Lemmon Survey	·	1.2 km	MPC · JPL
273486	2006 YE_{51}	—	December 23, 2006	Mount Lemmon	Mount Lemmon Survey	MAS	750 m	MPC · JPL
273487	2006 YT_{51}	—	December 24, 2006	Mount Lemmon	Mount Lemmon Survey	NYS	1.3 km	MPC · JPL
273488	2007 AA_{1}	—	January 8, 2007	Mount Lemmon	Mount Lemmon Survey	MAS	700 m	MPC · JPL
273489	2007 AU_{3}	—	January 8, 2007	Catalina	CSS	PHO	1.5 km	MPC · JPL
273490	2007 AW_{3}	—	January 8, 2007	Catalina	CSS	·	1.6 km	MPC · JPL
273491	2007 AT_{9}	—	January 8, 2007	Kitt Peak	Spacewatch	·	1.0 km	MPC · JPL
273492	2007 AE_{13}	—	January 9, 2007	Mount Lemmon	Mount Lemmon Survey	·	970 m	MPC · JPL
273493	2007 AP_{13}	—	January 9, 2007	Mount Lemmon	Mount Lemmon Survey	NYS	1.5 km	MPC · JPL
273494	2007 AF_{15}	—	January 10, 2007	Mount Lemmon	Mount Lemmon Survey	NYS	1.1 km	MPC · JPL
273495	2007 AW_{15}	—	January 10, 2007	Mount Lemmon	Mount Lemmon Survey	·	1.5 km	MPC · JPL
273496	2007 AL_{16}	—	January 10, 2007	Kitt Peak	Spacewatch	·	1.4 km	MPC · JPL
273497	2007 AH_{18}	—	January 8, 2007	Catalina	CSS	·	1.6 km	MPC · JPL
273498	2007 AX_{18}	—	January 13, 2007	Socorro	LINEAR	·	2.1 km	MPC · JPL
273499	2007 AR_{22}	—	January 10, 2007	Mount Lemmon	Mount Lemmon Survey	NYS	1.4 km	MPC · JPL
273500	2007 AX_{22}	—	January 10, 2007	Mount Lemmon	Mount Lemmon Survey	·	2.2 km	MPC · JPL

== 273501–273600 ==
back to top

Designation			Discovery			Properties		Ref
Permanent	Provisional	Named after	Date	Site	Discoverer(s)	Category	Diam.	Ref
273501	2007 AK_{26}	—	January 12, 2007	7300	W. K. Y. Yeung	·	1.5 km	MPC · JPL
273502	2007 AW_{26}	—	January 9, 2007	Mount Lemmon	Mount Lemmon Survey	·	1.0 km	MPC · JPL
273503	2007 AD_{27}	—	January 9, 2007	Kitt Peak	Spacewatch	NYS	1.5 km	MPC · JPL
273504	2007 AE_{27}	—	January 10, 2007	Kitt Peak	Spacewatch	NYS	920 m	MPC · JPL
273505	2007 AK_{27}	—	January 10, 2007	Mount Lemmon	Mount Lemmon Survey	·	870 m	MPC · JPL
273506	2007 AJ_{28}	—	January 9, 2007	Kitt Peak	Spacewatch	MAS	670 m	MPC · JPL
273507	2007 AC_{30}	—	January 9, 2007	Kitt Peak	Spacewatch	MAS	810 m	MPC · JPL
273508	2007 AN_{30}	—	January 10, 2007	Mount Lemmon	Mount Lemmon Survey	NYS	1.4 km	MPC · JPL
273509	2007 BV_{1}	—	January 16, 2007	Mount Lemmon	Mount Lemmon Survey	·	1.3 km	MPC · JPL
273510	2007 BJ_{2}	—	October 23, 2006	Mount Lemmon	Mount Lemmon Survey	·	1.9 km	MPC · JPL
273511	2007 BG_{3}	—	January 16, 2007	Socorro	LINEAR	·	1.5 km	MPC · JPL
273512	2007 BH_{3}	—	January 16, 2007	Socorro	LINEAR	·	1.2 km	MPC · JPL
273513	2007 BT_{3}	—	January 16, 2007	Socorro	LINEAR	NYS	1.3 km	MPC · JPL
273514	2007 BO_{5}	—	January 17, 2007	Catalina	CSS	·	1.7 km	MPC · JPL
273515	2007 BH_{11}	—	January 17, 2007	Kitt Peak	Spacewatch	·	1.5 km	MPC · JPL
273516	2007 BP_{11}	—	January 17, 2007	Kitt Peak	Spacewatch	·	1.4 km	MPC · JPL
273517	2007 BS_{13}	—	January 17, 2007	Kitt Peak	Spacewatch	·	1.3 km	MPC · JPL
273518	2007 BC_{15}	—	January 17, 2007	Kitt Peak	Spacewatch	·	1.2 km	MPC · JPL
273519	2007 BQ_{16}	—	January 17, 2007	Kitt Peak	Spacewatch	MAS	960 m	MPC · JPL
273520	2007 BT_{16}	—	January 17, 2007	Kitt Peak	Spacewatch	·	1.4 km	MPC · JPL
273521	2007 BA_{17}	—	January 17, 2007	Palomar	NEAT	V	910 m	MPC · JPL
273522	2007 BF_{17}	—	January 17, 2007	Kitt Peak	Spacewatch	·	2.0 km	MPC · JPL
273523	2007 BN_{18}	—	January 17, 2007	Palomar	NEAT	fast	870 m	MPC · JPL
273524	2007 BH_{19}	—	January 21, 2007	Socorro	LINEAR	·	2.2 km	MPC · JPL
273525	2007 BR_{21}	—	January 24, 2007	Socorro	LINEAR	NYS	1.1 km	MPC · JPL
273526	2007 BB_{25}	—	January 24, 2007	Mount Lemmon	Mount Lemmon Survey	·	1.1 km	MPC · JPL
273527	2007 BX_{26}	—	January 24, 2007	Mount Lemmon	Mount Lemmon Survey	·	1.3 km	MPC · JPL
273528	2007 BG_{27}	—	January 24, 2007	Catalina	CSS	·	1.1 km	MPC · JPL
273529	2007 BH_{27}	—	January 24, 2007	Catalina	CSS	·	1.2 km	MPC · JPL
273530	2007 BR_{27}	—	January 24, 2007	Catalina	CSS	·	1.4 km	MPC · JPL
273531	2007 BM_{30}	—	January 24, 2007	Catalina	CSS	·	1.5 km	MPC · JPL
273532	2007 BE_{32}	—	January 24, 2007	Mount Lemmon	Mount Lemmon Survey	NYS	1.5 km	MPC · JPL
273533	2007 BR_{32}	—	January 24, 2007	Mount Lemmon	Mount Lemmon Survey	NYS	1.2 km	MPC · JPL
273534	2007 BM_{33}	—	January 24, 2007	Mount Lemmon	Mount Lemmon Survey	·	990 m	MPC · JPL
273535	2007 BQ_{36}	—	January 24, 2007	Socorro	LINEAR	·	1.2 km	MPC · JPL
273536	2007 BQ_{37}	—	January 24, 2007	Mount Lemmon	Mount Lemmon Survey	·	720 m	MPC · JPL
273537	2007 BJ_{40}	—	January 24, 2007	Mount Lemmon	Mount Lemmon Survey	·	1.3 km	MPC · JPL
273538	2007 BT_{41}	—	January 24, 2007	Catalina	CSS	·	1.4 km	MPC · JPL
273539	2007 BK_{42}	—	January 24, 2007	Catalina	CSS	NYS	1.4 km	MPC · JPL
273540	2007 BS_{42}	—	January 24, 2007	Catalina	CSS	·	1.5 km	MPC · JPL
273541	2007 BC_{44}	—	January 24, 2007	Catalina	CSS	MAS	1.0 km	MPC · JPL
273542	2007 BL_{47}	—	January 26, 2007	Kitt Peak	Spacewatch	NYS	1.4 km	MPC · JPL
273543	2007 BP_{48}	—	January 26, 2007	Kitt Peak	Spacewatch	NYS	1.2 km	MPC · JPL
273544	2007 BF_{50}	—	January 28, 2007	Marly	P. Kocher	·	2.1 km	MPC · JPL
273545	2007 BK_{52}	—	January 24, 2007	Kitt Peak	Spacewatch	·	1.3 km	MPC · JPL
273546	2007 BR_{54}	—	January 24, 2007	Socorro	LINEAR	·	910 m	MPC · JPL
273547	2007 BP_{55}	—	January 24, 2007	Socorro	LINEAR	·	1.4 km	MPC · JPL
273548	2007 BH_{56}	—	January 24, 2007	Socorro	LINEAR	·	1.7 km	MPC · JPL
273549	2007 BN_{56}	—	January 24, 2007	Socorro	LINEAR	·	1.3 km	MPC · JPL
273550	2007 BU_{56}	—	January 24, 2007	Socorro	LINEAR	·	940 m	MPC · JPL
273551	2007 BY_{61}	—	January 27, 2007	Kitt Peak	Spacewatch	MAS	770 m	MPC · JPL
273552	2007 BF_{63}	—	January 27, 2007	Mount Lemmon	Mount Lemmon Survey	MAS	730 m	MPC · JPL
273553	2007 BQ_{64}	—	January 27, 2007	Kitt Peak	Spacewatch	·	1.1 km	MPC · JPL
273554	2007 BW_{64}	—	January 27, 2007	Mount Lemmon	Mount Lemmon Survey	·	1.4 km	MPC · JPL
273555	2007 BW_{65}	—	January 27, 2007	Mount Lemmon	Mount Lemmon Survey	MAS	760 m	MPC · JPL
273556	2007 BF_{68}	—	January 27, 2007	Kitt Peak	Spacewatch	NYS	1.9 km	MPC · JPL
273557	2007 BL_{70}	—	January 27, 2007	Mount Lemmon	Mount Lemmon Survey	·	2.4 km	MPC · JPL
273558	2007 BY_{74}	—	January 27, 2007	Kitt Peak	Spacewatch	NYS	1.0 km	MPC · JPL
273559	2007 BS_{75}	—	January 17, 2007	Kitt Peak	Spacewatch	V	850 m	MPC · JPL
273560	2007 BU_{78}	—	January 27, 2007	Mount Lemmon	Mount Lemmon Survey	·	910 m	MPC · JPL
273561	2007 BC_{79}	—	January 27, 2007	Mount Lemmon	Mount Lemmon Survey	·	1.4 km	MPC · JPL
273562	2007 BB_{80}	—	January 27, 2007	Kitt Peak	Spacewatch	NYS	1.1 km	MPC · JPL
273563	2007 BM_{81}	—	January 28, 2007	Kitt Peak	Spacewatch	·	1.1 km	MPC · JPL
273564	2007 BW_{91}	—	January 19, 2007	Mauna Kea	Mauna Kea	NYS	1.1 km	MPC · JPL
273565	2007 BM_{95}	—	January 19, 2007	Mauna Kea	Mauna Kea	NYS	1.2 km	MPC · JPL
273566	2007 BB_{100}	—	January 17, 2007	Kitt Peak	Spacewatch	·	1.4 km	MPC · JPL
273567	2007 BK_{101}	—	January 28, 2007	Mount Lemmon	Mount Lemmon Survey	·	1.4 km	MPC · JPL
273568	2007 BP_{101}	—	January 16, 2007	Catalina	CSS	V	950 m	MPC · JPL
273569	2007 CM	—	February 5, 2007	Palomar	NEAT	V	780 m	MPC · JPL
273570	2007 CK_{2}	—	February 6, 2007	Kitt Peak	Spacewatch	·	1.3 km	MPC · JPL
273571	2007 CS_{3}	—	February 6, 2007	Mount Lemmon	Mount Lemmon Survey	·	1.7 km	MPC · JPL
273572	2007 CM_{4}	—	February 6, 2007	Mount Lemmon	Mount Lemmon Survey	MAS	730 m	MPC · JPL
273573	2007 CY_{8}	—	February 6, 2007	Kitt Peak	Spacewatch	·	1.6 km	MPC · JPL
273574	2007 CP_{10}	—	February 6, 2007	Mount Lemmon	Mount Lemmon Survey	NYS	1.2 km	MPC · JPL
273575	2007 CY_{14}	—	February 7, 2007	Mount Lemmon	Mount Lemmon Survey	·	1.4 km	MPC · JPL
273576	2007 CY_{15}	—	February 6, 2007	Palomar	NEAT	·	1.5 km	MPC · JPL
273577	2007 CY_{17}	—	February 8, 2007	Mount Lemmon	Mount Lemmon Survey	·	1.4 km	MPC · JPL
273578	2007 CN_{20}	—	February 6, 2007	Mount Lemmon	Mount Lemmon Survey	MAS	890 m	MPC · JPL
273579	2007 CS_{21}	—	February 6, 2007	Palomar	NEAT	·	1.4 km	MPC · JPL
273580	2007 CN_{22}	—	February 6, 2007	Mount Lemmon	Mount Lemmon Survey	NYS	1.4 km	MPC · JPL
273581	2007 CQ_{22}	—	February 6, 2007	Mount Lemmon	Mount Lemmon Survey	·	1.3 km	MPC · JPL
273582	2007 CT_{22}	—	February 6, 2007	Palomar	NEAT	·	1.9 km	MPC · JPL
273583	2007 CY_{25}	—	February 9, 2007	Catalina	CSS	·	1.1 km	MPC · JPL
273584	2007 CG_{32}	—	February 6, 2007	Mount Lemmon	Mount Lemmon Survey	·	2.2 km	MPC · JPL
273585	2007 CH_{44}	—	February 8, 2007	Palomar	NEAT	NYS	1.4 km	MPC · JPL
273586	2007 CM_{44}	—	February 8, 2007	Palomar	NEAT	·	1.1 km	MPC · JPL
273587	2007 CJ_{46}	—	February 8, 2007	Palomar	NEAT	·	2.3 km	MPC · JPL
273588	2007 CO_{46}	—	February 8, 2007	Mount Lemmon	Mount Lemmon Survey	·	1.8 km	MPC · JPL
273589	2007 CX_{46}	—	February 8, 2007	Palomar	NEAT	·	1.8 km	MPC · JPL
273590	2007 CR_{47}	—	February 10, 2007	Mount Lemmon	Mount Lemmon Survey	NYS	1.2 km	MPC · JPL
273591	2007 CT_{50}	—	February 13, 2007	Catalina	CSS	·	1.3 km	MPC · JPL
273592	2007 CE_{54}	—	February 10, 2007	Catalina	CSS	·	1.5 km	MPC · JPL
273593	2007 CK_{54}	—	February 6, 2007	Kitt Peak	Spacewatch	NYS	1.4 km	MPC · JPL
273594	2007 CX_{57}	—	February 9, 2007	Catalina	CSS	·	1.7 km	MPC · JPL
273595	2007 CR_{58}	—	February 10, 2007	Catalina	CSS	HNS	1.6 km	MPC · JPL
273596	2007 CT_{58}	—	February 10, 2007	Catalina	CSS	·	2.4 km	MPC · JPL
273597	2007 CC_{59}	—	February 10, 2007	Catalina	CSS	V	870 m	MPC · JPL
273598	2007 CN_{59}	—	February 10, 2007	Catalina	CSS	·	1.7 km	MPC · JPL
273599	2007 CZ_{59}	—	February 10, 2007	Catalina	CSS	·	1.5 km	MPC · JPL
273600	2007 CO_{60}	—	February 10, 2007	Catalina	CSS	V	890 m	MPC · JPL

== 273601–273700 ==
back to top

Designation			Discovery			Properties		Ref
Permanent	Provisional	Named after	Date	Site	Discoverer(s)	Category	Diam.	Ref
273601	2007 CO_{61}	—	February 15, 2007	Palomar	NEAT	·	1.6 km	MPC · JPL
273602	2007 CO_{62}	—	February 13, 2007	Socorro	LINEAR	NYS ·	1.3 km	MPC · JPL
273603	2007 CQ_{62}	—	February 15, 2007	Catalina	CSS	·	1.5 km	MPC · JPL
273604	2007 CA_{63}	—	February 15, 2007	Palomar	NEAT	NYS	1.1 km	MPC · JPL
273605	2007 CY_{63}	—	February 15, 2007	Palomar	NEAT	MAS	1.0 km	MPC · JPL
273606	2007 CK_{64}	—	February 6, 2007	Palomar	NEAT	·	1.2 km	MPC · JPL
273607	2007 CO_{64}	—	February 9, 2007	Kitt Peak	Spacewatch	NYS	1.2 km	MPC · JPL
273608	2007 DF	—	February 16, 2007	Mayhill	Lowe, A.	·	2.7 km	MPC · JPL
273609	2007 DF_{2}	—	February 16, 2007	Catalina	CSS	V	870 m	MPC · JPL
273610	2007 DP_{2}	—	February 16, 2007	Catalina	CSS	NYS	1.1 km	MPC · JPL
273611	2007 DB_{4}	—	February 16, 2007	Mount Lemmon	Mount Lemmon Survey	·	2.4 km	MPC · JPL
273612	2007 DU_{5}	—	February 17, 2007	Kitt Peak	Spacewatch	·	1.4 km	MPC · JPL
273613	2007 DZ_{11}	—	February 16, 2007	Catalina	CSS	·	1.6 km	MPC · JPL
273614	2007 DZ_{12}	—	February 16, 2007	Palomar	NEAT	·	1.7 km	MPC · JPL
273615	2007 DL_{13}	—	February 16, 2007	Palomar	NEAT	·	1.5 km	MPC · JPL
273616	2007 DL_{17}	—	February 17, 2007	Kitt Peak	Spacewatch	·	1.7 km	MPC · JPL
273617	2007 DH_{18}	—	February 17, 2007	Kitt Peak	Spacewatch	MAS	930 m	MPC · JPL
273618	2007 DH_{19}	—	February 17, 2007	Kitt Peak	Spacewatch	MAS	840 m	MPC · JPL
273619	2007 DW_{23}	—	February 17, 2007	Kitt Peak	Spacewatch	NYS	1.4 km	MPC · JPL
273620	2007 DR_{24}	—	February 17, 2007	Kitt Peak	Spacewatch	·	2.2 km	MPC · JPL
273621	2007 DU_{24}	—	February 17, 2007	Kitt Peak	Spacewatch	·	1.1 km	MPC · JPL
273622	2007 DX_{24}	—	February 17, 2007	Kitt Peak	Spacewatch	V	860 m	MPC · JPL
273623	2007 DU_{26}	—	February 17, 2007	Kitt Peak	Spacewatch	NYS	1.5 km	MPC · JPL
273624	2007 DW_{26}	—	February 17, 2007	Kitt Peak	Spacewatch	·	2.0 km	MPC · JPL
273625	2007 DT_{29}	—	February 17, 2007	Kitt Peak	Spacewatch	WIT	1.0 km	MPC · JPL
273626	2007 DU_{33}	—	February 17, 2007	Kitt Peak	Spacewatch	·	1.2 km	MPC · JPL
273627	2007 DW_{34}	—	February 17, 2007	Kitt Peak	Spacewatch	·	1.4 km	MPC · JPL
273628	2007 DF_{37}	—	February 17, 2007	Kitt Peak	Spacewatch	MAS	780 m	MPC · JPL
273629	2007 DX_{37}	—	February 17, 2007	Kitt Peak	Spacewatch	NYS	1.3 km	MPC · JPL
273630	2007 DJ_{41}	—	February 19, 2007	Mount Lemmon	Mount Lemmon Survey	·	2.1 km	MPC · JPL
273631	2007 DA_{42}	—	February 16, 2007	Mount Lemmon	Mount Lemmon Survey	·	2.0 km	MPC · JPL
273632	2007 DU_{45}	—	February 21, 2007	Kitt Peak	Spacewatch	·	1.3 km	MPC · JPL
273633	2007 DW_{45}	—	February 21, 2007	Bergisch Gladbach	W. Bickel	·	1.2 km	MPC · JPL
273634	2007 DA_{48}	—	February 21, 2007	Mount Lemmon	Mount Lemmon Survey	·	1.5 km	MPC · JPL
273635	2007 DU_{49}	—	February 16, 2007	Catalina	CSS	(5)	1.3 km	MPC · JPL
273636	2007 DX_{49}	—	February 16, 2007	Catalina	CSS	V	1.0 km	MPC · JPL
273637	2007 DN_{51}	—	February 17, 2007	Palomar	NEAT	EUN	1.5 km	MPC · JPL
273638	2007 DO_{53}	—	February 19, 2007	Mount Lemmon	Mount Lemmon Survey	·	1.6 km	MPC · JPL
273639	2007 DR_{53}	—	February 19, 2007	Mount Lemmon	Mount Lemmon Survey	·	1.5 km	MPC · JPL
273640	2007 DT_{54}	—	February 21, 2007	Kitt Peak	Spacewatch	(5)	1.5 km	MPC · JPL
273641	2007 DD_{56}	—	February 21, 2007	Socorro	LINEAR	·	1.7 km	MPC · JPL
273642	2007 DO_{56}	—	February 21, 2007	Mount Lemmon	Mount Lemmon Survey	·	1.2 km	MPC · JPL
273643	2007 DV_{59}	—	February 22, 2007	Anderson Mesa	LONEOS	MAS	1.1 km	MPC · JPL
273644	2007 DR_{61}	—	February 19, 2007	Mount Lemmon	Mount Lemmon Survey	·	1.8 km	MPC · JPL
273645	2007 DA_{65}	—	February 21, 2007	Kitt Peak	Spacewatch	·	1.4 km	MPC · JPL
273646	2007 DH_{66}	—	February 21, 2007	Kitt Peak	Spacewatch	·	1.5 km	MPC · JPL
273647	2007 DJ_{71}	—	February 21, 2007	Kitt Peak	Spacewatch	·	1.4 km	MPC · JPL
273648	2007 DN_{74}	—	February 21, 2007	Mount Lemmon	Mount Lemmon Survey	NYS	1.1 km	MPC · JPL
273649	2007 DO_{74}	—	February 21, 2007	Kitt Peak	Spacewatch	MAS	880 m	MPC · JPL
273650	2007 DP_{75}	—	February 21, 2007	Kitt Peak	Spacewatch	·	1.2 km	MPC · JPL
273651	2007 DJ_{77}	—	February 22, 2007	Catalina	CSS	PHO	2.1 km	MPC · JPL
273652	2007 DO_{77}	—	February 22, 2007	Catalina	CSS	V	900 m	MPC · JPL
273653	2007 DA_{81}	—	February 23, 2007	Kitt Peak	Spacewatch	NYS	1.5 km	MPC · JPL
273654	2007 DB_{81}	—	February 23, 2007	Kitt Peak	Spacewatch	·	1.5 km	MPC · JPL
273655	2007 DN_{82}	—	February 23, 2007	Mount Lemmon	Mount Lemmon Survey	·	1.6 km	MPC · JPL
273656	2007 DL_{84}	—	February 25, 2007	Mount Lemmon	Mount Lemmon Survey	·	3.3 km	MPC · JPL
273657	2007 DU_{86}	—	February 23, 2007	Mount Lemmon	Mount Lemmon Survey	·	1.9 km	MPC · JPL
273658	2007 DA_{87}	—	February 23, 2007	Mount Lemmon	Mount Lemmon Survey	·	1.1 km	MPC · JPL
273659	2007 DS_{90}	—	February 23, 2007	Kitt Peak	Spacewatch	NYS	1.5 km	MPC · JPL
273660	2007 DE_{92}	—	February 23, 2007	Kitt Peak	Spacewatch	·	1.1 km	MPC · JPL
273661	2007 DU_{95}	—	February 23, 2007	Kitt Peak	Spacewatch	·	2.0 km	MPC · JPL
273662	2007 DS_{96}	—	February 23, 2007	Mount Lemmon	Mount Lemmon Survey	·	1.3 km	MPC · JPL
273663	2007 DJ_{98}	—	February 25, 2007	Mount Lemmon	Mount Lemmon Survey	·	1.6 km	MPC · JPL
273664	2007 DJ_{99}	—	February 25, 2007	Mount Lemmon	Mount Lemmon Survey	·	2.0 km	MPC · JPL
273665	2007 DH_{100}	—	February 25, 2007	Mount Lemmon	Mount Lemmon Survey	·	1.3 km	MPC · JPL
273666	2007 DE_{103}	—	February 21, 2007	Kitt Peak	M. W. Buie	·	1.3 km	MPC · JPL
273667	2007 DV_{106}	—	February 23, 2007	Mount Lemmon	Mount Lemmon Survey	·	1.5 km	MPC · JPL
273668	2007 DA_{110}	—	February 25, 2007	Mount Lemmon	Mount Lemmon Survey	·	1.4 km	MPC · JPL
273669	2007 DK_{110}	—	February 17, 2007	Mount Lemmon	Mount Lemmon Survey	·	1.4 km	MPC · JPL
273670	2007 DR_{112}	—	February 26, 2007	Mount Lemmon	Mount Lemmon Survey	·	1.9 km	MPC · JPL
273671	2007 DZ_{112}	—	February 17, 2007	Kitt Peak	Spacewatch	(2076)	850 m	MPC · JPL
273672	2007 DW_{113}	—	February 23, 2007	Mount Lemmon	Mount Lemmon Survey	·	1.1 km	MPC · JPL
273673	2007 EV_{2}	—	March 9, 2007	Catalina	CSS	·	1.5 km	MPC · JPL
273674	2007 ED_{3}	—	March 9, 2007	Catalina	CSS	·	2.5 km	MPC · JPL
273675	2007 EC_{7}	—	March 9, 2007	Mount Lemmon	Mount Lemmon Survey	·	1.2 km	MPC · JPL
273676	2007 EJ_{8}	—	March 9, 2007	Mount Lemmon	Mount Lemmon Survey	·	1.7 km	MPC · JPL
273677	2007 ED_{11}	—	March 9, 2007	Kitt Peak	Spacewatch	MAS	1.1 km	MPC · JPL
273678	2007 EX_{11}	—	March 9, 2007	Catalina	CSS	·	1.4 km	MPC · JPL
273679	2007 ED_{14}	—	March 9, 2007	Kitt Peak	Spacewatch	·	1.8 km	MPC · JPL
273680	2007 EM_{14}	—	March 9, 2007	Palomar	NEAT	·	1.5 km	MPC · JPL
273681	2007 EB_{15}	—	March 9, 2007	Mount Lemmon	Mount Lemmon Survey	·	1.2 km	MPC · JPL
273682	2007 EN_{16}	—	March 9, 2007	Catalina	CSS	ADE	3.5 km	MPC · JPL
273683	2007 EX_{16}	—	March 9, 2007	Kitt Peak	Spacewatch	·	1.5 km	MPC · JPL
273684	2007 EG_{18}	—	March 9, 2007	Palomar	NEAT	NYS	1.9 km	MPC · JPL
273685	2007 EB_{22}	—	March 10, 2007	Kitt Peak	Spacewatch	NYS	1.3 km	MPC · JPL
273686	2007 ES_{25}	—	March 10, 2007	Mount Lemmon	Mount Lemmon Survey	(5)	1.9 km	MPC · JPL
273687	2007 EG_{27}	—	March 12, 2007	Altschwendt	W. Ries	·	1.4 km	MPC · JPL
273688	2007 EE_{30}	—	March 9, 2007	Palomar	NEAT	V	940 m	MPC · JPL
273689	2007 ER_{31}	—	March 10, 2007	Kitt Peak	Spacewatch	·	1.3 km	MPC · JPL
273690	2007 EW_{31}	—	March 10, 2007	Kitt Peak	Spacewatch	·	1.0 km	MPC · JPL
273691	2007 EM_{32}	—	March 10, 2007	Mount Lemmon	Mount Lemmon Survey	NYS	1.3 km	MPC · JPL
273692	2007 EY_{32}	—	March 10, 2007	Kitt Peak	Spacewatch	·	1.6 km	MPC · JPL
273693	2007 EJ_{35}	—	March 11, 2007	Kitt Peak	Spacewatch	·	1.7 km	MPC · JPL
273694	2007 EE_{38}	—	March 11, 2007	Mount Lemmon	Mount Lemmon Survey	·	1.8 km	MPC · JPL
273695	2007 EO_{39}	—	March 12, 2007	Marly	P. Kocher	EUN	1.3 km	MPC · JPL
273696	2007 EK_{40}	—	March 12, 2007	Bergisch Gladbach	W. Bickel	·	1.6 km	MPC · JPL
273697	2007 EN_{41}	—	March 9, 2007	Mount Lemmon	Mount Lemmon Survey	MAS	720 m	MPC · JPL
273698	2007 EO_{41}	—	March 9, 2007	Mount Lemmon	Mount Lemmon Survey	EUN	1.0 km	MPC · JPL
273699	2007 EJ_{42}	—	March 9, 2007	Kitt Peak	Spacewatch	·	1.6 km	MPC · JPL
273700	2007 EQ_{42}	—	March 9, 2007	Kitt Peak	Spacewatch	·	3.3 km	MPC · JPL

== 273701–273800 ==
back to top

Designation			Discovery			Properties		Ref
Permanent	Provisional	Named after	Date	Site	Discoverer(s)	Category	Diam.	Ref
273701	2007 ET_{42}	—	March 9, 2007	Kitt Peak	Spacewatch	·	1.1 km	MPC · JPL
273702	2007 EG_{43}	—	March 9, 2007	Kitt Peak	Spacewatch	·	1.3 km	MPC · JPL
273703	2007 EK_{45}	—	March 9, 2007	Kitt Peak	Spacewatch	·	2.6 km	MPC · JPL
273704	2007 EA_{47}	—	March 9, 2007	Kitt Peak	Spacewatch	·	1.9 km	MPC · JPL
273705	2007 EA_{52}	—	March 11, 2007	Catalina	CSS	(5)	1.4 km	MPC · JPL
273706	2007 EB_{58}	—	March 9, 2007	Mount Lemmon	Mount Lemmon Survey	NYS	1.1 km	MPC · JPL
273707	2007 EQ_{59}	—	March 9, 2007	Catalina	CSS	NYS	1.6 km	MPC · JPL
273708	2007 EB_{63}	—	March 10, 2007	Kitt Peak	Spacewatch	·	1.6 km	MPC · JPL
273709	2007 EB_{65}	—	March 10, 2007	Kitt Peak	Spacewatch	PAD	2.0 km	MPC · JPL
273710	2007 EQ_{65}	—	March 10, 2007	Kitt Peak	Spacewatch	·	2.4 km	MPC · JPL
273711	2007 EW_{65}	—	March 10, 2007	Kitt Peak	Spacewatch	·	1.2 km	MPC · JPL
273712	2007 EJ_{68}	—	March 10, 2007	Kitt Peak	Spacewatch	·	1.6 km	MPC · JPL
273713	2007 EJ_{69}	—	March 10, 2007	Kitt Peak	Spacewatch	V	750 m	MPC · JPL
273714	2007 EE_{74}	—	March 10, 2007	Kitt Peak	Spacewatch	·	1.0 km	MPC · JPL
273715	2007 EC_{75}	—	March 10, 2007	Kitt Peak	Spacewatch	MAS	1.0 km	MPC · JPL
273716	2007 EJ_{78}	—	March 10, 2007	Mount Lemmon	Mount Lemmon Survey	·	1.1 km	MPC · JPL
273717	2007 ES_{80}	—	March 11, 2007	Kitt Peak	Spacewatch	·	1.0 km	MPC · JPL
273718	2007 ES_{84}	—	March 12, 2007	Catalina	CSS	EUN	1.8 km	MPC · JPL
273719	2007 ED_{85}	—	March 12, 2007	Kitt Peak	Spacewatch	EUN	1.8 km	MPC · JPL
273720	2007 EU_{85}	—	March 12, 2007	Catalina	CSS	·	2.7 km	MPC · JPL
273721	2007 EF_{89}	—	March 9, 2007	Kitt Peak	Spacewatch	MAS	930 m	MPC · JPL
273722	2007 EZ_{90}	—	March 9, 2007	Mount Lemmon	Mount Lemmon Survey	·	1.5 km	MPC · JPL
273723	2007 EV_{91}	—	March 10, 2007	Kitt Peak	Spacewatch	NYS	1.4 km	MPC · JPL
273724	2007 EA_{92}	—	March 10, 2007	Kitt Peak	Spacewatch	NYS	1.3 km	MPC · JPL
273725	2007 ED_{92}	—	March 10, 2007	Kitt Peak	Spacewatch	·	2.0 km	MPC · JPL
273726	2007 EE_{92}	—	March 10, 2007	Kitt Peak	Spacewatch	·	1.5 km	MPC · JPL
273727	2007 EQ_{92}	—	March 10, 2007	Mount Lemmon	Mount Lemmon Survey	V	680 m	MPC · JPL
273728	2007 ET_{97}	—	March 11, 2007	Kitt Peak	Spacewatch	NYS	1.3 km	MPC · JPL
273729	2007 EB_{98}	—	March 11, 2007	Kitt Peak	Spacewatch	·	1.5 km	MPC · JPL
273730	2007 EQ_{98}	—	March 11, 2007	Kitt Peak	Spacewatch	·	1.5 km	MPC · JPL
273731	2007 EO_{99}	—	March 11, 2007	Kitt Peak	Spacewatch	NEM	2.0 km	MPC · JPL
273732	2007 EM_{103}	—	March 11, 2007	Mount Lemmon	Mount Lemmon Survey	AGN	1.6 km	MPC · JPL
273733	2007 EK_{104}	—	March 11, 2007	Mount Lemmon	Mount Lemmon Survey	·	1.9 km	MPC · JPL
273734	2007 EL_{106}	—	March 11, 2007	Anderson Mesa	LONEOS	·	4.7 km	MPC · JPL
273735	2007 EF_{110}	—	March 11, 2007	Kitt Peak	Spacewatch	NYS	1.5 km	MPC · JPL
273736	2007 ET_{110}	—	March 11, 2007	Kitt Peak	Spacewatch	·	1.6 km	MPC · JPL
273737	2007 EG_{112}	—	March 11, 2007	Kitt Peak	Spacewatch	·	1.5 km	MPC · JPL
273738	2007 EP_{112}	—	March 11, 2007	Kitt Peak	Spacewatch	·	1.3 km	MPC · JPL
273739	2007 EB_{113}	—	March 12, 2007	Kitt Peak	Spacewatch	NYS	1.1 km	MPC · JPL
273740	2007 EU_{114}	—	March 13, 2007	Mount Lemmon	Mount Lemmon Survey	PAD	2.9 km	MPC · JPL
273741	2007 EA_{115}	—	March 13, 2007	Mount Lemmon	Mount Lemmon Survey	·	1.8 km	MPC · JPL
273742	2007 EY_{116}	—	March 13, 2007	Mount Lemmon	Mount Lemmon Survey	·	1.9 km	MPC · JPL
273743	2007 EZ_{118}	—	March 13, 2007	Mount Lemmon	Mount Lemmon Survey	·	1.5 km	MPC · JPL
273744	2007 EG_{120}	—	March 13, 2007	Mount Lemmon	Mount Lemmon Survey	(5)	1.8 km	MPC · JPL
273745	2007 EB_{121}	—	March 14, 2007	Mount Lemmon	Mount Lemmon Survey	MAS	840 m	MPC · JPL
273746	2007 ET_{126}	—	March 9, 2007	Mount Lemmon	Mount Lemmon Survey	·	1.3 km	MPC · JPL
273747	2007 EG_{128}	—	March 9, 2007	Mount Lemmon	Mount Lemmon Survey	HOF	2.8 km	MPC · JPL
273748	2007 EL_{130}	—	March 9, 2007	Mount Lemmon	Mount Lemmon Survey	·	1.5 km	MPC · JPL
273749	2007 EX_{134}	—	March 10, 2007	Mount Lemmon	Mount Lemmon Survey	·	1.7 km	MPC · JPL
273750	2007 EL_{135}	—	March 10, 2007	Mount Lemmon	Mount Lemmon Survey	·	1.5 km	MPC · JPL
273751	2007 EV_{138}	—	March 12, 2007	Kitt Peak	Spacewatch	NYS	1.4 km	MPC · JPL
273752	2007 EZ_{138}	—	March 12, 2007	Kitt Peak	Spacewatch	·	1.8 km	MPC · JPL
273753	2007 ER_{139}	—	March 12, 2007	Kitt Peak	Spacewatch	·	2.5 km	MPC · JPL
273754	2007 EA_{141}	—	March 12, 2007	Kitt Peak	Spacewatch	WIT	1.1 km	MPC · JPL
273755	2007 EE_{143}	—	March 12, 2007	Kitt Peak	Spacewatch	·	1.2 km	MPC · JPL
273756	2007 EU_{144}	—	March 12, 2007	Mount Lemmon	Mount Lemmon Survey	·	1.3 km	MPC · JPL
273757	2007 EV_{144}	—	March 12, 2007	Mount Lemmon	Mount Lemmon Survey	·	1.9 km	MPC · JPL
273758	2007 ET_{145}	—	March 12, 2007	Mount Lemmon	Mount Lemmon Survey	·	1.4 km	MPC · JPL
273759	2007 EG_{146}	—	March 12, 2007	Mount Lemmon	Mount Lemmon Survey	·	1.5 km	MPC · JPL
273760	2007 EZ_{146}	—	March 12, 2007	Mount Lemmon	Mount Lemmon Survey	·	2.3 km	MPC · JPL
273761	2007 EP_{151}	—	March 12, 2007	Mount Lemmon	Mount Lemmon Survey	·	1.4 km	MPC · JPL
273762	2007 EE_{154}	—	March 12, 2007	Kitt Peak	Spacewatch	·	1.6 km	MPC · JPL
273763	2007 EW_{155}	—	March 12, 2007	Kitt Peak	Spacewatch	·	1.8 km	MPC · JPL
273764	2007 EH_{159}	—	March 14, 2007	Mount Lemmon	Mount Lemmon Survey	NYS	1.6 km	MPC · JPL
273765	2007 EP_{162}	—	March 15, 2007	Mount Lemmon	Mount Lemmon Survey	NYS	1.2 km	MPC · JPL
273766	2007 EH_{166}	—	March 10, 2007	Palomar	NEAT	·	1.7 km	MPC · JPL
273767	2007 EW_{167}	—	March 13, 2007	Kitt Peak	Spacewatch	·	1.2 km	MPC · JPL
273768	2007 EK_{169}	—	March 13, 2007	Kitt Peak	Spacewatch	·	1.4 km	MPC · JPL
273769	2007 EW_{170}	—	March 15, 2007	Kitt Peak	Spacewatch	·	1.7 km	MPC · JPL
273770	2007 EB_{180}	—	March 14, 2007	Mount Lemmon	Mount Lemmon Survey	·	1.9 km	MPC · JPL
273771	2007 EU_{181}	—	March 14, 2007	Kitt Peak	Spacewatch	·	1.7 km	MPC · JPL
273772	2007 EM_{182}	—	March 14, 2007	Kitt Peak	Spacewatch	·	1.5 km	MPC · JPL
273773	2007 EK_{191}	—	March 13, 2007	Kitt Peak	Spacewatch	·	1.6 km	MPC · JPL
273774	2007 ED_{192}	—	March 13, 2007	Lulin	Lin, C.-S., Q. Ye	·	1.9 km	MPC · JPL
273775	2007 EE_{196}	—	March 15, 2007	Kitt Peak	Spacewatch	·	1.5 km	MPC · JPL
273776	2007 ET_{198}	—	March 10, 2007	Catalina	CSS	PHO	1.2 km	MPC · JPL
273777	2007 EF_{202}	—	March 9, 2007	Catalina	CSS	NYS	1.6 km	MPC · JPL
273778	2007 EH_{207}	—	March 14, 2007	Socorro	LINEAR	·	1.7 km	MPC · JPL
273779	2007 EY_{209}	—	March 6, 2007	Palomar	NEAT	·	1.8 km	MPC · JPL
273780	2007 EH_{211}	—	March 8, 2007	Palomar	NEAT	·	1.9 km	MPC · JPL
273781	2007 EP_{219}	—	March 15, 2007	Kitt Peak	Spacewatch	·	2.5 km	MPC · JPL
273782	2007 EU_{220}	—	March 11, 2007	Mount Lemmon	Mount Lemmon Survey	·	1.1 km	MPC · JPL
273783	2007 EY_{220}	—	March 13, 2007	Kitt Peak	Spacewatch	·	3.7 km	MPC · JPL
273784	2007 ED_{222}	—	March 11, 2007	Mount Lemmon	Mount Lemmon Survey	·	2.8 km	MPC · JPL
273785	2007 EQ_{223}	—	March 10, 2007	Kitt Peak	Spacewatch	·	1.4 km	MPC · JPL
273786	2007 FN	—	March 16, 2007	Mount Lemmon	Mount Lemmon Survey	·	2.1 km	MPC · JPL
273787	2007 FX	—	March 16, 2007	Kitt Peak	Spacewatch	·	1.3 km	MPC · JPL
273788	2007 FT_{2}	—	March 16, 2007	Catalina	CSS	·	2.0 km	MPC · JPL
273789	2007 FO_{4}	—	March 18, 2007	Kitt Peak	Spacewatch	·	1.6 km	MPC · JPL
273790	2007 FW_{4}	—	March 16, 2007	Kitt Peak	Spacewatch	·	1.6 km	MPC · JPL
273791	2007 FG_{7}	—	March 16, 2007	Anderson Mesa	LONEOS	·	3.3 km	MPC · JPL
273792	2007 FJ_{11}	—	March 16, 2007	Kitt Peak	Spacewatch	·	1.8 km	MPC · JPL
273793	2007 FU_{11}	—	March 17, 2007	Kitt Peak	Spacewatch	·	1.1 km	MPC · JPL
273794	2007 FW_{15}	—	March 19, 2007	Catalina	CSS	·	4.8 km	MPC · JPL
273795	2007 FN_{17}	—	March 20, 2007	Kitt Peak	Spacewatch	·	1.5 km	MPC · JPL
273796	2007 FM_{18}	—	March 19, 2007	La Sagra	OAM	·	1.6 km	MPC · JPL
273797	2007 FV_{18}	—	March 20, 2007	Mount Lemmon	Mount Lemmon Survey	·	1.5 km	MPC · JPL
273798	2007 FT_{19}	—	March 20, 2007	Mount Lemmon	Mount Lemmon Survey	·	900 m	MPC · JPL
273799	2007 FW_{21}	—	March 20, 2007	Kitt Peak	Spacewatch	RAF	1.1 km	MPC · JPL
273800	2007 FH_{22}	—	March 20, 2007	Kitt Peak	Spacewatch	·	980 m	MPC · JPL

== 273801–273900 ==
back to top

Designation			Discovery			Properties		Ref
Permanent	Provisional	Named after	Date	Site	Discoverer(s)	Category	Diam.	Ref
273801	2007 FG_{23}	—	March 20, 2007	Kitt Peak	Spacewatch	MAS	1.0 km	MPC · JPL
273802	2007 FG_{24}	—	March 20, 2007	Kitt Peak	Spacewatch	·	1.4 km	MPC · JPL
273803	2007 FX_{24}	—	March 20, 2007	Kitt Peak	Spacewatch	·	1.1 km	MPC · JPL
273804	2007 FB_{26}	—	March 20, 2007	Mount Lemmon	Mount Lemmon Survey	·	1.3 km	MPC · JPL
273805	2007 FU_{26}	—	March 20, 2007	Kitt Peak	Spacewatch	(5)	1.4 km	MPC · JPL
273806	2007 FK_{27}	—	March 20, 2007	Mount Lemmon	Mount Lemmon Survey	·	1.1 km	MPC · JPL
273807	2007 FE_{28}	—	March 20, 2007	Mount Lemmon	Mount Lemmon Survey	NYS	1.1 km	MPC · JPL
273808	2007 FQ_{28}	—	March 20, 2007	Mount Lemmon	Mount Lemmon Survey	NYS	1.3 km	MPC · JPL
273809	2007 FM_{31}	—	March 20, 2007	Kitt Peak	Spacewatch	·	1.6 km	MPC · JPL
273810	2007 FL_{32}	—	March 20, 2007	Kitt Peak	Spacewatch	·	1.0 km	MPC · JPL
273811	2007 FQ_{32}	—	March 20, 2007	Kitt Peak	Spacewatch	·	1.7 km	MPC · JPL
273812	2007 FX_{32}	—	March 20, 2007	Kitt Peak	Spacewatch	·	1.9 km	MPC · JPL
273813	2007 FU_{37}	—	March 26, 2007	Kitt Peak	Spacewatch	·	1.5 km	MPC · JPL
273814	2007 FL_{38}	—	March 29, 2007	Palomar	NEAT	·	2.1 km	MPC · JPL
273815	2007 FS_{38}	—	March 25, 2007	Mount Lemmon	Mount Lemmon Survey	·	2.4 km	MPC · JPL
273816	2007 FA_{39}	—	March 28, 2007	Siding Spring	SSS	·	1.9 km	MPC · JPL
273817	2007 FM_{45}	—	March 26, 2007	Mount Lemmon	Mount Lemmon Survey	·	1.8 km	MPC · JPL
273818	2007 FF_{48}	—	March 20, 2007	Kitt Peak	Spacewatch	·	1.2 km	MPC · JPL
273819	2007 GY_{7}	—	April 7, 2007	Mount Lemmon	Mount Lemmon Survey	·	1.6 km	MPC · JPL
273820	2007 GY_{8}	—	April 7, 2007	Mount Lemmon	Mount Lemmon Survey	AGN	1.5 km	MPC · JPL
273821	2007 GP_{12}	—	April 11, 2007	Kitt Peak	Spacewatch	·	1.5 km	MPC · JPL
273822	2007 GE_{19}	—	April 11, 2007	Kitt Peak	Spacewatch	EUN	2.1 km	MPC · JPL
273823	2007 GC_{20}	—	April 11, 2007	Kitt Peak	Spacewatch	·	1.8 km	MPC · JPL
273824	2007 GL_{21}	—	April 11, 2007	Mount Lemmon	Mount Lemmon Survey	·	1.8 km	MPC · JPL
273825	2007 GT_{21}	—	April 11, 2007	Mount Lemmon	Mount Lemmon Survey	EUN	1.9 km	MPC · JPL
273826	2007 GV_{21}	—	April 11, 2007	Mount Lemmon	Mount Lemmon Survey	·	4.1 km	MPC · JPL
273827	2007 GZ_{21}	—	April 11, 2007	Mount Lemmon	Mount Lemmon Survey	·	1.1 km	MPC · JPL
273828	2007 GF_{22}	—	April 11, 2007	Mount Lemmon	Mount Lemmon Survey	·	1.3 km	MPC · JPL
273829	2007 GQ_{22}	—	April 11, 2007	Mount Lemmon	Mount Lemmon Survey	·	1.6 km	MPC · JPL
273830	2007 GS_{22}	—	April 11, 2007	Mount Lemmon	Mount Lemmon Survey	·	1.8 km	MPC · JPL
273831	2007 GZ_{22}	—	April 11, 2007	Mount Lemmon	Mount Lemmon Survey	·	1.5 km	MPC · JPL
273832	2007 GB_{23}	—	April 11, 2007	Mount Lemmon	Mount Lemmon Survey	·	1.6 km	MPC · JPL
273833	2007 GM_{23}	—	April 11, 2007	Kitt Peak	Spacewatch	·	3.2 km	MPC · JPL
273834	2007 GO_{25}	—	April 13, 2007	Siding Spring	SSS	·	2.1 km	MPC · JPL
273835	2007 GM_{27}	—	April 14, 2007	Mount Lemmon	Mount Lemmon Survey	EUN	1.9 km	MPC · JPL
273836 Hoijyusek	2007 GZ_{27}	Hoijyusek	April 13, 2007	Lulin	Q. Ye, Lin, H.-C.	·	3.5 km	MPC · JPL
273837	2007 GK_{31}	—	April 14, 2007	Kitt Peak	Spacewatch	·	2.0 km	MPC · JPL
273838	2007 GP_{31}	—	April 15, 2007	Mount Lemmon	Mount Lemmon Survey	·	1.4 km	MPC · JPL
273839	2007 GM_{37}	—	April 14, 2007	Kitt Peak	Spacewatch	·	2.3 km	MPC · JPL
273840	2007 GN_{38}	—	April 14, 2007	Kitt Peak	Spacewatch	KOR	1.6 km	MPC · JPL
273841	2007 GN_{39}	—	April 14, 2007	Kitt Peak	Spacewatch	AGN	1.5 km	MPC · JPL
273842	2007 GC_{41}	—	April 14, 2007	Kitt Peak	Spacewatch	·	1.6 km	MPC · JPL
273843	2007 GE_{41}	—	April 14, 2007	Kitt Peak	Spacewatch	·	1.5 km	MPC · JPL
273844	2007 GZ_{41}	—	April 14, 2007	Kitt Peak	Spacewatch	·	1.9 km	MPC · JPL
273845	2007 GG_{42}	—	April 14, 2007	Kitt Peak	Spacewatch	·	1.9 km	MPC · JPL
273846	2007 GO_{42}	—	April 14, 2007	Kitt Peak	Spacewatch	·	1.0 km	MPC · JPL
273847	2007 GZ_{42}	—	April 14, 2007	Kitt Peak	Spacewatch	·	2.0 km	MPC · JPL
273848	2007 GO_{44}	—	April 14, 2007	Kitt Peak	Spacewatch	·	1.3 km	MPC · JPL
273849	2007 GZ_{44}	—	April 14, 2007	Kitt Peak	Spacewatch	·	1.2 km	MPC · JPL
273850	2007 GE_{45}	—	April 14, 2007	Kitt Peak	Spacewatch	·	2.2 km	MPC · JPL
273851	2007 GB_{46}	—	April 14, 2007	Kitt Peak	Spacewatch	MIS	3.6 km	MPC · JPL
273852	2007 GD_{47}	—	April 14, 2007	Kitt Peak	Spacewatch	·	3.5 km	MPC · JPL
273853	2007 GL_{47}	—	April 14, 2007	Mount Lemmon	Mount Lemmon Survey	EUN	1.5 km	MPC · JPL
273854	2007 GH_{48}	—	April 14, 2007	Kitt Peak	Spacewatch	·	1.6 km	MPC · JPL
273855	2007 GK_{48}	—	April 14, 2007	Kitt Peak	Spacewatch	JUN	1.8 km	MPC · JPL
273856	2007 GR_{50}	—	April 15, 2007	Kitt Peak	Spacewatch	·	3.9 km	MPC · JPL
273857	2007 GL_{53}	—	April 14, 2007	Mount Lemmon	Mount Lemmon Survey	·	1.7 km	MPC · JPL
273858	2007 GP_{53}	—	April 14, 2007	Kitt Peak	Spacewatch	·	1.5 km	MPC · JPL
273859	2007 GD_{58}	—	April 15, 2007	Kitt Peak	Spacewatch	·	1.6 km	MPC · JPL
273860	2007 GS_{59}	—	April 15, 2007	Kitt Peak	Spacewatch	·	1.4 km	MPC · JPL
273861	2007 GK_{60}	—	April 15, 2007	Kitt Peak	Spacewatch	MRX	1.3 km	MPC · JPL
273862	2007 GF_{64}	—	April 15, 2007	Kitt Peak	Spacewatch	KOR	1.4 km	MPC · JPL
273863	2007 GK_{64}	—	April 15, 2007	Kitt Peak	Spacewatch	·	2.9 km	MPC · JPL
273864	2007 GP_{67}	—	April 15, 2007	Kitt Peak	Spacewatch	·	1.8 km	MPC · JPL
273865	2007 GB_{68}	—	April 15, 2007	Kitt Peak	Spacewatch	·	1.5 km	MPC · JPL
273866	2007 GU_{70}	—	April 15, 2007	Mount Lemmon	Mount Lemmon Survey	·	3.2 km	MPC · JPL
273867	2007 GO_{72}	—	April 15, 2007	Mount Lemmon	Mount Lemmon Survey	·	1.6 km	MPC · JPL
273868	2007 GW_{72}	—	January 2, 2006	Catalina	CSS	·	4.0 km	MPC · JPL
273869	2007 GK_{73}	—	April 15, 2007	Catalina	CSS	·	4.0 km	MPC · JPL
273870	2007 GP_{74}	—	April 15, 2007	Mount Lemmon	Mount Lemmon Survey	·	3.2 km	MPC · JPL
273871	2007 GD_{75}	—	April 15, 2007	Kitt Peak	Spacewatch	·	1.7 km	MPC · JPL
273872	2007 GK_{75}	—	April 14, 2007	Kitt Peak	Spacewatch	EUN	1.6 km	MPC · JPL
273873	2007 GC_{76}	—	April 15, 2007	Kitt Peak	Spacewatch	·	2.7 km	MPC · JPL
273874	2007 GO_{76}	—	April 15, 2007	Kitt Peak	Spacewatch	·	2.6 km	MPC · JPL
273875	2007 HM	—	April 17, 2007	7300	W. K. Y. Yeung	·	2.3 km	MPC · JPL
273876	2007 HM_{3}	—	April 16, 2007	Socorro	LINEAR	·	2.6 km	MPC · JPL
273877	2007 HU_{5}	—	April 16, 2007	Catalina	CSS	·	1.4 km	MPC · JPL
273878	2007 HN_{6}	—	April 16, 2007	Anderson Mesa	LONEOS	·	2.1 km	MPC · JPL
273879	2007 HQ_{7}	—	April 16, 2007	Purple Mountain	PMO NEO Survey Program	·	3.5 km	MPC · JPL
273880	2007 HD_{11}	—	April 18, 2007	Kitt Peak	Spacewatch	·	1.8 km	MPC · JPL
273881	2007 HD_{12}	—	April 18, 2007	Kitt Peak	Spacewatch	·	1.2 km	MPC · JPL
273882	2007 HG_{12}	—	April 19, 2007	Mount Lemmon	Mount Lemmon Survey	·	1.4 km	MPC · JPL
273883	2007 HF_{13}	—	April 16, 2007	Catalina	CSS	·	5.4 km	MPC · JPL
273884	2007 HG_{14}	—	April 19, 2007	Mount Lemmon	Mount Lemmon Survey	·	2.6 km	MPC · JPL
273885	2007 HV_{15}	—	April 18, 2007	Lulin	LUSS	·	2.0 km	MPC · JPL
273886	2007 HS_{20}	—	April 18, 2007	Kitt Peak	Spacewatch	(194)	2.1 km	MPC · JPL
273887	2007 HD_{26}	—	April 18, 2007	Kitt Peak	Spacewatch	EUN	1.2 km	MPC · JPL
273888	2007 HH_{26}	—	April 18, 2007	Kitt Peak	Spacewatch	·	2.2 km	MPC · JPL
273889	2007 HO_{27}	—	April 18, 2007	Kitt Peak	Spacewatch	·	2.0 km	MPC · JPL
273890	2007 HW_{27}	—	April 18, 2007	Kitt Peak	Spacewatch	·	3.4 km	MPC · JPL
273891	2007 HG_{28}	—	April 18, 2007	Mount Lemmon	Mount Lemmon Survey	·	1.5 km	MPC · JPL
273892	2007 HL_{31}	—	April 19, 2007	Kitt Peak	Spacewatch	·	1.5 km	MPC · JPL
273893	2007 HL_{33}	—	April 19, 2007	Socorro	LINEAR	·	3.1 km	MPC · JPL
273894	2007 HT_{33}	—	April 19, 2007	Kitt Peak	Spacewatch	EOS	2.6 km	MPC · JPL
273895	2007 HV_{35}	—	April 19, 2007	Kitt Peak	Spacewatch	·	1.9 km	MPC · JPL
273896	2007 HZ_{37}	—	April 20, 2007	Kitt Peak	Spacewatch	·	1.2 km	MPC · JPL
273897	2007 HN_{43}	—	April 22, 2007	Mount Lemmon	Mount Lemmon Survey	·	2.3 km	MPC · JPL
273898	2007 HY_{44}	—	April 18, 2007	Mount Lemmon	Mount Lemmon Survey	·	1.7 km	MPC · JPL
273899	2007 HV_{45}	—	April 18, 2007	Mount Lemmon	Mount Lemmon Survey	·	1.6 km	MPC · JPL
273900	2007 HQ_{47}	—	April 20, 2007	Kitt Peak	Spacewatch	KOR	1.8 km	MPC · JPL

== 273901–274000 ==
back to top

Designation			Discovery			Properties		Ref
Permanent	Provisional	Named after	Date	Site	Discoverer(s)	Category	Diam.	Ref
273901	2007 HM_{48}	—	April 20, 2007	Kitt Peak	Spacewatch	·	1.1 km	MPC · JPL
273902	2007 HR_{48}	—	April 20, 2007	Kitt Peak	Spacewatch	·	1.5 km	MPC · JPL
273903	2007 HU_{50}	—	April 20, 2007	Kitt Peak	Spacewatch	·	2.0 km	MPC · JPL
273904	2007 HT_{51}	—	April 20, 2007	Kitt Peak	Spacewatch	(5)	1.4 km	MPC · JPL
273905	2007 HU_{51}	—	April 20, 2007	Kitt Peak	Spacewatch	·	1.2 km	MPC · JPL
273906	2007 HD_{54}	—	April 22, 2007	Kitt Peak	Spacewatch	WIT	1.3 km	MPC · JPL
273907	2007 HT_{57}	—	April 22, 2007	Mount Lemmon	Mount Lemmon Survey	·	1.5 km	MPC · JPL
273908	2007 HG_{59}	—	April 18, 2007	Mount Lemmon	Mount Lemmon Survey	·	2.5 km	MPC · JPL
273909	2007 HV_{59}	—	April 18, 2007	Mount Lemmon	Mount Lemmon Survey	·	1.7 km	MPC · JPL
273910	2007 HF_{62}	—	April 22, 2007	Mount Lemmon	Mount Lemmon Survey	EOS	2.2 km	MPC · JPL
273911	2007 HM_{65}	—	April 22, 2007	Catalina	CSS	·	3.9 km	MPC · JPL
273912	2007 HS_{65}	—	April 22, 2007	Catalina	CSS	·	1.4 km	MPC · JPL
273913	2007 HB_{71}	—	April 20, 2007	Kitt Peak	Spacewatch	GEF	3.3 km	MPC · JPL
273914	2007 HT_{71}	—	April 22, 2007	Kitt Peak	Spacewatch	(5)	1.3 km	MPC · JPL
273915	2007 HG_{73}	—	October 24, 2005	Mauna Kea	A. Boattini	KOR	1.9 km	MPC · JPL
273916	2007 HX_{73}	—	April 22, 2007	Catalina	CSS	·	1.7 km	MPC · JPL
273917	2007 HB_{74}	—	April 22, 2007	Catalina	CSS	ADE	4.6 km	MPC · JPL
273918	2007 HE_{76}	—	November 30, 2005	Kitt Peak	Spacewatch	·	1.5 km	MPC · JPL
273919	2007 HP_{77}	—	April 23, 2007	Kitt Peak	Spacewatch	·	1.4 km	MPC · JPL
273920	2007 HL_{78}	—	April 23, 2007	Catalina	CSS	·	2.2 km	MPC · JPL
273921	2007 HT_{85}	—	April 24, 2007	Kitt Peak	Spacewatch	ADE	4.6 km	MPC · JPL
273922	2007 HO_{88}	—	April 20, 2007	Kitt Peak	Spacewatch	·	2.7 km	MPC · JPL
273923	2007 HJ_{90}	—	April 22, 2007	Siding Spring	SSS	·	1.7 km	MPC · JPL
273924	2007 HO_{90}	—	April 24, 2007	Catalina	CSS	·	2.5 km	MPC · JPL
273925	2007 HF_{96}	—	April 16, 2007	Catalina	CSS	EUN	1.6 km	MPC · JPL
273926	2007 JJ_{1}	—	May 7, 2007	Kitt Peak	Spacewatch	·	1.7 km	MPC · JPL
273927	2007 JH_{3}	—	May 6, 2007	Kitt Peak	Spacewatch	JUN	1.8 km	MPC · JPL
273928	2007 JN_{3}	—	May 6, 2007	Kitt Peak	Spacewatch	·	2.0 km	MPC · JPL
273929	2007 JH_{4}	—	May 7, 2007	Kitt Peak	Spacewatch	·	2.6 km	MPC · JPL
273930	2007 JJ_{4}	—	May 7, 2007	Catalina	CSS	·	2.9 km	MPC · JPL
273931	2007 JY_{4}	—	May 7, 2007	Kitt Peak	Spacewatch	·	3.0 km	MPC · JPL
273932	2007 JQ_{10}	—	May 7, 2007	Kitt Peak	Spacewatch	ADE	2.7 km	MPC · JPL
273933	2007 JX_{10}	—	May 7, 2007	Kitt Peak	Spacewatch	·	1.6 km	MPC · JPL
273934	2007 JA_{13}	—	May 7, 2007	Kitt Peak	Spacewatch	·	1.6 km	MPC · JPL
273935	2007 JS_{14}	—	May 10, 2007	Mount Lemmon	Mount Lemmon Survey	·	1.9 km	MPC · JPL
273936 Tangjingchuan	2007 JC_{16}	Tangjingchuan	May 9, 2007	Lulin	Q. Ye, Lin, H.-C.	·	2.4 km	MPC · JPL
273937	2007 JY_{17}	—	May 7, 2007	Mount Lemmon	Mount Lemmon Survey	·	2.0 km	MPC · JPL
273938	2007 JX_{20}	—	May 11, 2007	Mount Lemmon	Mount Lemmon Survey	·	2.0 km	MPC · JPL
273939	2007 JV_{21}	—	May 10, 2007	Kitt Peak	Spacewatch	·	1.2 km	MPC · JPL
273940	2007 JJ_{22}	—	May 7, 2007	Catalina	CSS	JUN	1.3 km	MPC · JPL
273941	2007 JB_{23}	—	May 13, 2007	Tiki	S. F. Hönig, Teamo, N.	·	3.9 km	MPC · JPL
273942	2007 JS_{23}	—	May 7, 2007	Lulin	LUSS	·	3.7 km	MPC · JPL
273943	2007 JM_{26}	—	May 9, 2007	Kitt Peak	Spacewatch	·	3.0 km	MPC · JPL
273944	2007 JX_{26}	—	May 9, 2007	Kitt Peak	Spacewatch	HOF	3.7 km	MPC · JPL
273945	2007 JO_{27}	—	May 9, 2007	Catalina	CSS	·	2.5 km	MPC · JPL
273946	2007 JH_{28}	—	May 10, 2007	Kitt Peak	Spacewatch	·	2.1 km	MPC · JPL
273947	2007 JJ_{28}	—	May 10, 2007	Kitt Peak	Spacewatch	·	1.7 km	MPC · JPL
273948	2007 JG_{34}	—	May 10, 2007	Anderson Mesa	LONEOS	·	1.9 km	MPC · JPL
273949	2007 JG_{35}	—	May 13, 2007	Mount Lemmon	Mount Lemmon Survey	·	2.4 km	MPC · JPL
273950	2007 JQ_{37}	—	May 12, 2007	Kitt Peak	Spacewatch	·	2.0 km	MPC · JPL
273951	2007 JA_{40}	—	May 13, 2007	Mount Lemmon	Mount Lemmon Survey	·	3.9 km	MPC · JPL
273952	2007 JZ_{40}	—	May 13, 2007	Kitt Peak	Spacewatch	·	1.4 km	MPC · JPL
273953	2007 JR_{41}	—	May 12, 2007	Mount Lemmon	Mount Lemmon Survey	·	2.6 km	MPC · JPL
273954	2007 JV_{41}	—	May 13, 2007	Mount Lemmon	Mount Lemmon Survey	·	2.2 km	MPC · JPL
273955	2007 JD_{45}	—	May 7, 2007	Kitt Peak	Spacewatch	·	1.3 km	MPC · JPL
273956	2007 JH_{45}	—	May 12, 2007	Mount Lemmon	Mount Lemmon Survey	·	1.3 km	MPC · JPL
273957	2007 JK_{45}	—	May 10, 2007	Anderson Mesa	LONEOS	·	1.5 km	MPC · JPL
273958	2007 KK_{1}	—	May 17, 2007	Kitt Peak	Spacewatch	(31811)	4.1 km	MPC · JPL
273959	2007 KX_{1}	—	May 18, 2007	Wrightwood	J. W. Young	·	2.7 km	MPC · JPL
273960	2007 KR_{2}	—	May 20, 2007	Catalina	CSS	·	3.6 km	MPC · JPL
273961	2007 KC_{4}	—	May 23, 2007	7300	W. K. Y. Yeung	·	3.0 km	MPC · JPL
273962	2007 KQ_{4}	—	May 21, 2007	Kitt Peak	Spacewatch	·	2.7 km	MPC · JPL
273963	2007 KO_{5}	—	May 21, 2007	Catalina	CSS	ADE	4.0 km	MPC · JPL
273964	2007 KS_{7}	—	May 16, 2007	Siding Spring	SSS	·	2.1 km	MPC · JPL
273965	2007 KY_{8}	—	May 25, 2007	Catalina	CSS	·	4.1 km	MPC · JPL
273966	2007 KE_{9}	—	May 26, 2007	Siding Spring	SSS	·	3.4 km	MPC · JPL
273967	2007 LW_{1}	—	June 7, 2007	Kitt Peak	Spacewatch	·	1.8 km	MPC · JPL
273968	2007 LH_{3}	—	June 8, 2007	Kitt Peak	Spacewatch	·	3.7 km	MPC · JPL
273969	2007 LK_{4}	—	June 8, 2007	Kitt Peak	Spacewatch	·	1.8 km	MPC · JPL
273970	2007 LH_{5}	—	June 9, 2007	Kitt Peak	Spacewatch	·	2.9 km	MPC · JPL
273971	2007 LK_{8}	—	June 9, 2007	Kitt Peak	Spacewatch	EMA	3.3 km	MPC · JPL
273972	2007 LP_{8}	—	June 9, 2007	Kitt Peak	Spacewatch	GEF	1.5 km	MPC · JPL
273973	2007 LA_{9}	—	June 8, 2007	Catalina	CSS	·	2.4 km	MPC · JPL
273974	2007 LB_{9}	—	June 8, 2007	Catalina	CSS	·	1.8 km	MPC · JPL
273975	2007 LD_{9}	—	June 8, 2007	Kitt Peak	Spacewatch	·	1.8 km	MPC · JPL
273976	2007 LN_{13}	—	June 10, 2007	Kitt Peak	Spacewatch	·	2.6 km	MPC · JPL
273977	2007 LE_{15}	—	June 9, 2007	Reedy Creek	J. Broughton	EUN	1.7 km	MPC · JPL
273978	2007 LJ_{15}	—	June 11, 2007	La Sagra	OAM	·	3.4 km	MPC · JPL
273979	2007 LH_{20}	—	June 9, 2007	Kitt Peak	Spacewatch	·	2.6 km	MPC · JPL
273980	2007 LJ_{21}	—	June 12, 2007	Kitt Peak	Spacewatch	RAF	1.3 km	MPC · JPL
273981	2007 LY_{21}	—	June 12, 2007	Kitt Peak	Spacewatch	·	2.5 km	MPC · JPL
273982	2007 LL_{22}	—	June 13, 2007	Kitt Peak	Spacewatch	EUN	1.9 km	MPC · JPL
273983	2007 LK_{23}	—	June 13, 2007	Kitt Peak	Spacewatch	·	4.0 km	MPC · JPL
273984	2007 LW_{23}	—	June 14, 2007	Kitt Peak	Spacewatch	·	3.9 km	MPC · JPL
273985	2007 LZ_{24}	—	June 14, 2007	Kitt Peak	Spacewatch	·	2.8 km	MPC · JPL
273986	2007 LQ_{29}	—	June 15, 2007	Kitt Peak	Spacewatch	EOS	2.5 km	MPC · JPL
273987 Greggwade	2007 LQ_{30}	Greggwade	June 11, 2007	Mauna Kea	D. D. Balam	·	2.6 km	MPC · JPL
273988	2007 MF_{7}	—	June 18, 2007	Kitt Peak	Spacewatch	·	3.2 km	MPC · JPL
273989	2007 MU_{7}	—	June 18, 2007	Kitt Peak	Spacewatch	AGN	1.5 km	MPC · JPL
273990	2007 MR_{13}	—	June 18, 2007	Kitt Peak	Spacewatch	·	1.5 km	MPC · JPL
273991	2007 MX_{16}	—	June 21, 2007	Kitt Peak	Spacewatch	·	2.8 km	MPC · JPL
273992	2007 MZ_{16}	—	June 21, 2007	Kitt Peak	Spacewatch	EUN	1.3 km	MPC · JPL
273993	2007 MO_{24}	—	June 23, 2007	Kitt Peak	Spacewatch	·	3.7 km	MPC · JPL
273994 Cinqueterre	2007 NH_{1}	Cinqueterre	July 11, 2007	Vallemare Borbona	V. S. Casulli	·	4.8 km	MPC · JPL
273995	2007 OB	—	July 16, 2007	Wrightwood	J. W. Young	EOS	2.2 km	MPC · JPL
273996	2007 OQ	—	July 17, 2007	Eskridge	G. Hug	·	3.6 km	MPC · JPL
273997	2007 OT_{2}	—	July 20, 2007	Tiki	S. F. Hönig, Teamo, N.	·	2.8 km	MPC · JPL
273998	2007 OF_{4}	—	July 19, 2007	La Sagra	OAM	·	3.9 km	MPC · JPL
273999	2007 OO_{10}	—	July 18, 2007	Mount Lemmon	Mount Lemmon Survey	·	3.0 km	MPC · JPL
274000	2007 PF_{1}	—	August 4, 2007	Bergisch Gladbach	W. Bickel	·	4.5 km	MPC · JPL

back to top

== See also ==
- Meanings of minor-planet names: 273001–274000
