= Lychakiv Cemetery =

Cemetery in Lviv, Ukraine

- Ukrainian: Личаківський цвинтар Polish: Cmentarz Łyczakowski
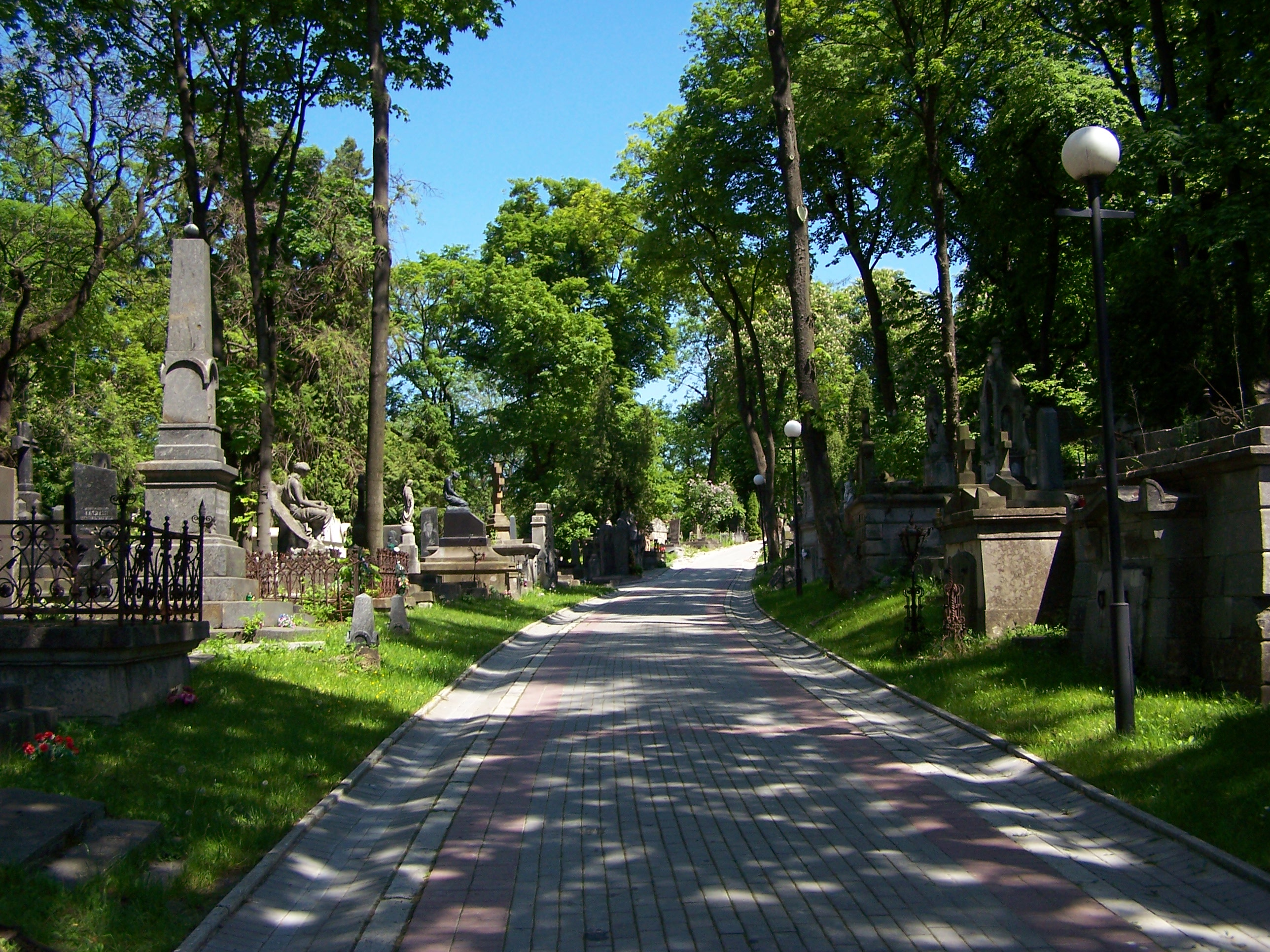
- One of the cemetery alleys, 2007
- Interactive map of Lychakiv Cemetery

Details
- Established: 1787
- Location: Lychakivskyi District, Lviv
- Country: Ukraine
- Coordinates: 49.833°N 24.056°E
- Type: Public (restricted)
- Size: 40 ha
- No. of graves: more than 300,000

Immovable Monument of National Significance of Ukraine
- Official name: Комплекс пам'яток "Личаківський цвинтар" (Lychakiv Cemetery monument complex)
- Type: History
- Reference no.: 130008-Н

The Lychakiv Cemetery (Ukrainian: Личаківський цвинтар, romanized: Lychakivskyi tsvyntar; Polish: Cmentarz Łyczakowski we Lwowie), officially titled State History and Culture Museum-Reserve "Lychakiv Cemetery" (Ukrainian: Державний історико-культурний музей-заповідник «Личаківський цвинтар»), is a historic cemetery in Lviv, Ukraine.

== History ==
Since its creation in 1787 as Łyczakowski Cemetery, it has been the main necropolis of the city's (at the time named Lemberg) intelligentsia, middle and upper classes. Initially the cemetery was located on several hills in the borough of Lychakiv, following the imperial Austro-Hungarian (the city was located in Austria-Hungary at the time) edict ordering that all cemeteries be moved outside of the city limits. The original project was prepared by Karol Bauer, the head of the Lviv University botanical garden.

In mid-1850s the cemetery was expanded significantly by Tytus Tchórzewski, who created the present network of alleys and round-abouts. It then became the main city cemetery, and soon most other cemeteries were closed. The two largest that remained were the Yanivskiy Cemetery (Polish: cmentarz Janowski), with many working class graves and the adjacent New Jewish Cemetery. Lychakivskiy Cemetery was used by all Christian sects in the city: in addition to Roman Catholics, it also included Eastern Rite Catholics, Protestants and Orthodox.

After World War II the city (at the time named Lwów) was annexed (from the Second Polish Republic) by the Soviet Union to the Ukrainian Soviet Socialist Republic. The majority of the surviving pre-war inhabitants of the city were expelled to the former German areas awarded to Poland after the Yalta Conference. This started a period of devastation of historical monuments located at the cemetery. Up to 1971 many of the sculptures were destroyed. However, in 1975 the cemetery was declared a historical monument and the degradation ended. From that time on, the necropolis has been reserved for burial of prominent personalities, as well as members of families in possession of their own vaults and graves. In 1987 restoration works on the graves were started by activists of the Lion's Society. Since the late 1980s, the cemetery has seen constant rebuilding and refurbishment and continues to be one of the principal tourist attractions of Lviv.

In late 2006 the city administration announced plans to transfer the tombs of Stepan Bandera, Yevhen Konovalets, Andriy Melnyk and other key leaders of Organization of Ukrainian Nationalists (OUN) / Ukrainian Insurgent Army (UPA) to a new area of the cemetery dedicated to the Ukrainian national liberation struggle.

== Cemetery sections ==
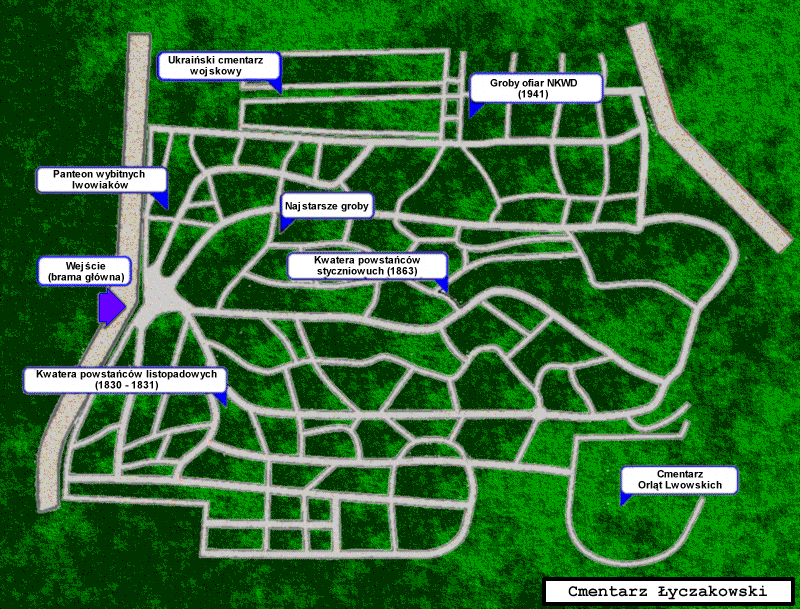
Lychakiv Cemetery plan Plan legend: 1 — Field of Mars 2 — NKVD victims' graves (1941 г.) 3 — Outstanding Poles Pantheon 4 — The eldest graves 5 — Main gates 6 — 1863 January rebels' quarter 7 — 1830−1831 November rebels' quarter 8 — Ukrainian National Army Memorial 9 — Lwów Defenders' Cemetery (Cemetery of Lwów Eaglets)

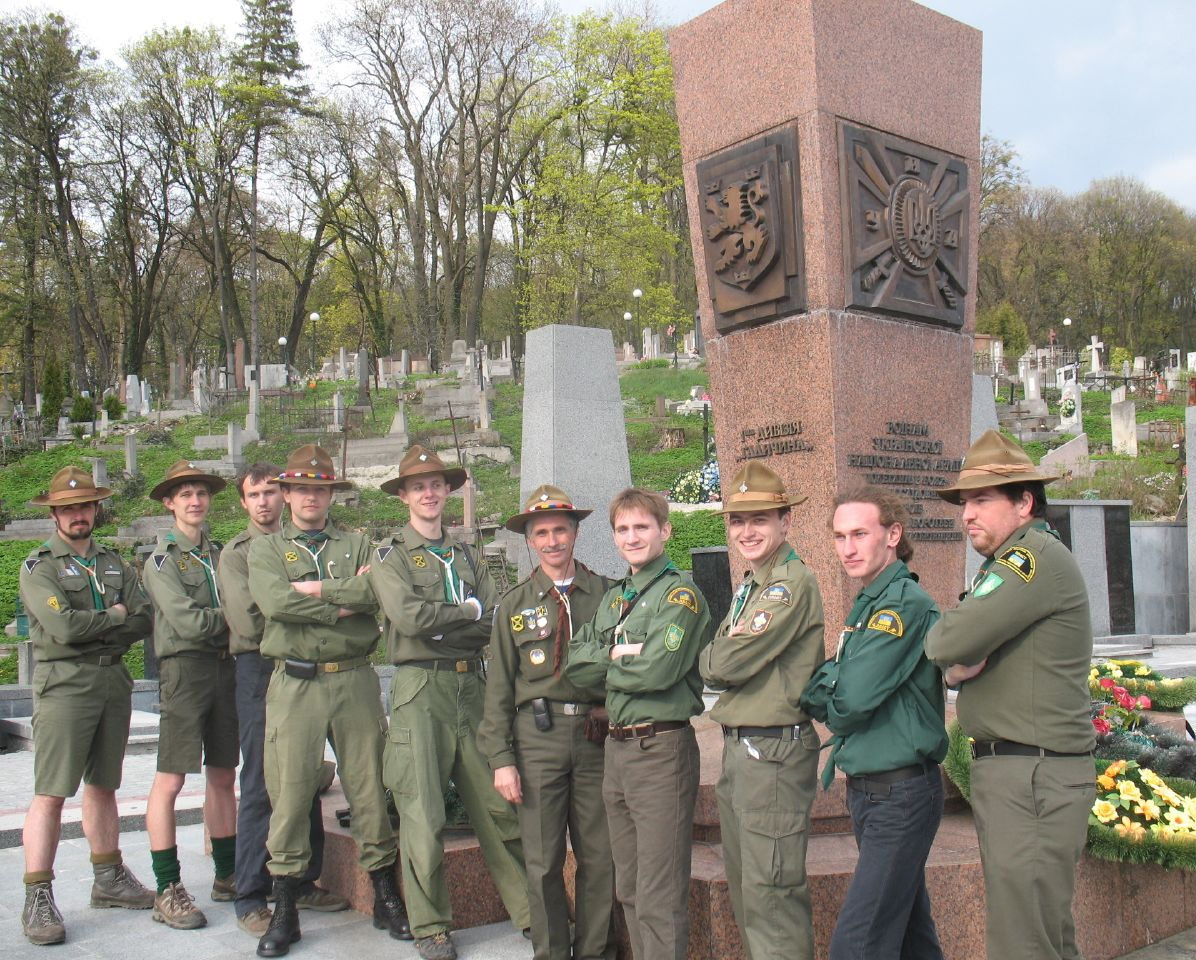
Members of the National Scout Organization of Ukraine «Plast» near the Monument to the SS-Division «Galicia», 2008.

=== Ukrainian National Army Memorial ===
The Ukrainian National Army Memorial (Number 8 on the plan) is devoted to the Ukrainian National Army soldiers buried in the cemetery, including soldiers of the SS Division "Galicia". It was established due to the efforts of Ukrainian national-patriotic organizations and the Ukrainian emigrant veterans' movement. It was established with the special effort of Ferentsevich Yuri, a division veteran, Ukrainian emigrant veterans' movement social activist and Plast (National Scout Organization of Ukraine) veteran who took an active part in the creation of memorials to the SS Division Galicia on the mountain Zhbyr and near the village of Chervone.

=== Field of Mars ===
On the north side of the Cemetery is situated the Field of Mars (No. 1 on the plan), a war memorial built in 1974. This war memorial originall contained the graves of 3,800 Soviet soldiers who died in the battles against the Nazi occupiers during World War II (named as the Great Patriotic War in Soviet ideology) and against units of Ukrainian Insurgent Army (UPA) (acting up to the mid-1950s). On the wall of the memorial was written a verse:

At the middle of the planet
in the storm clouds thunder
the dead are watching the sky
believing in the wisdom of the living

Poetic writing in honor of the Soviet soldiers was eliminated at the direction of urban authorities in the 1990s.

The Field of Mars has been used as a burial site for Ukrainian soldiers who died during the Russo-Ukrainian War due to the lack of space at the Ukrainian National Army Memorial within the walls of the Lychakiv Cemetery, according to the head of the Ukrainian Greek Catholic Church's Military Chaplaincy Center. The Lviv Oblast Council announced on May 20, 2022 that it would hold an architectural contest in order to select the design for a war memorial at the site, which has been described as part of the decommunization process in Ukraine. On August 19, 2022, Lviv authorities approved the exhumation of the remains of Soviet soldiers from the location. The exhumation proceedings uncovered remains dating back to the First World War and belonging to soldiers of the German, Austro-Hungarian, Ottoman and Russian armies, which are set to be moved into a dedicated section within the planned memorial, as well as World War II and post-War Soviet burials, which will be transferred to the Holoskiv Cemetery in Lviv.

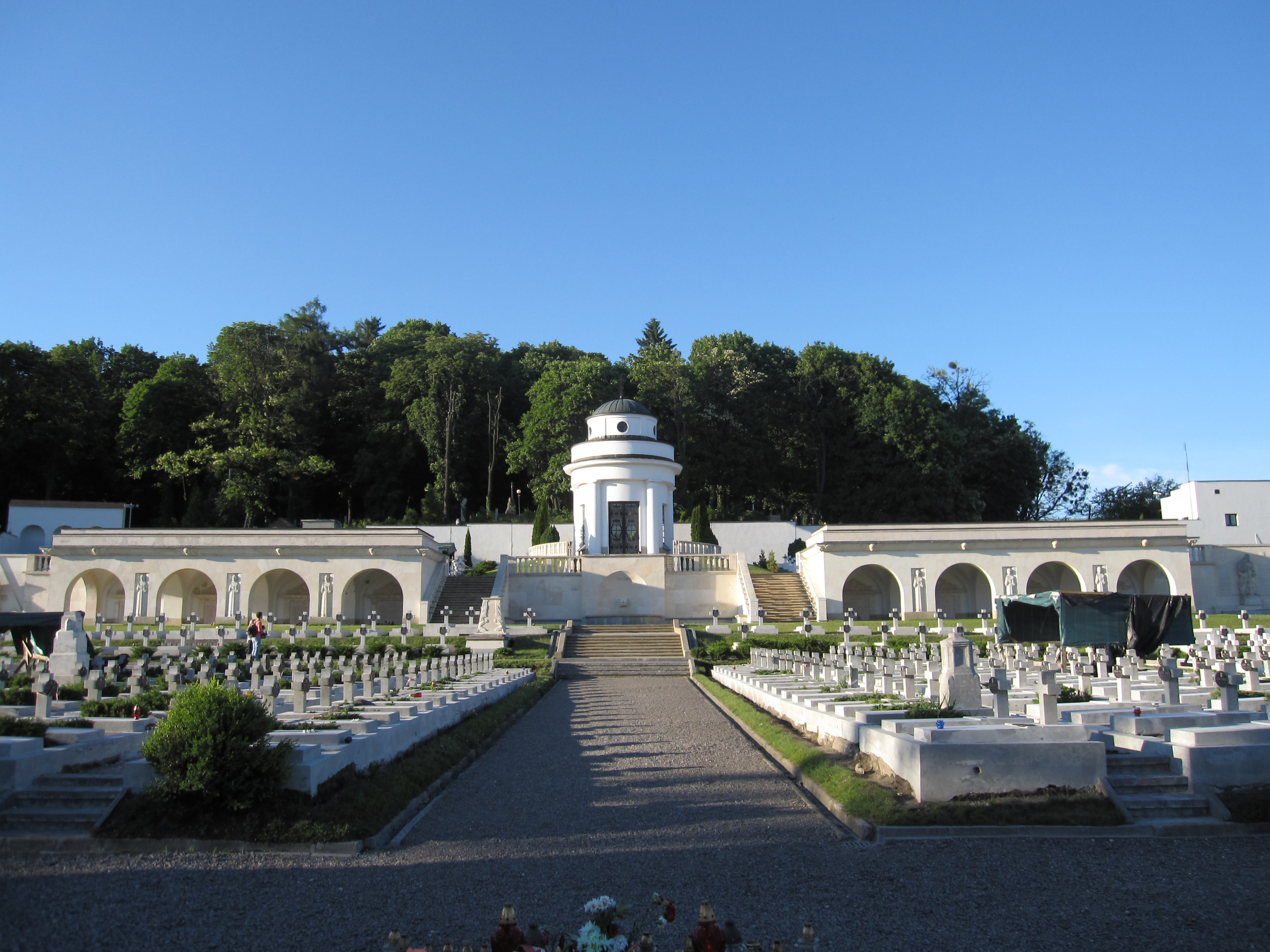
Cemetery of the Defenders of Lwów

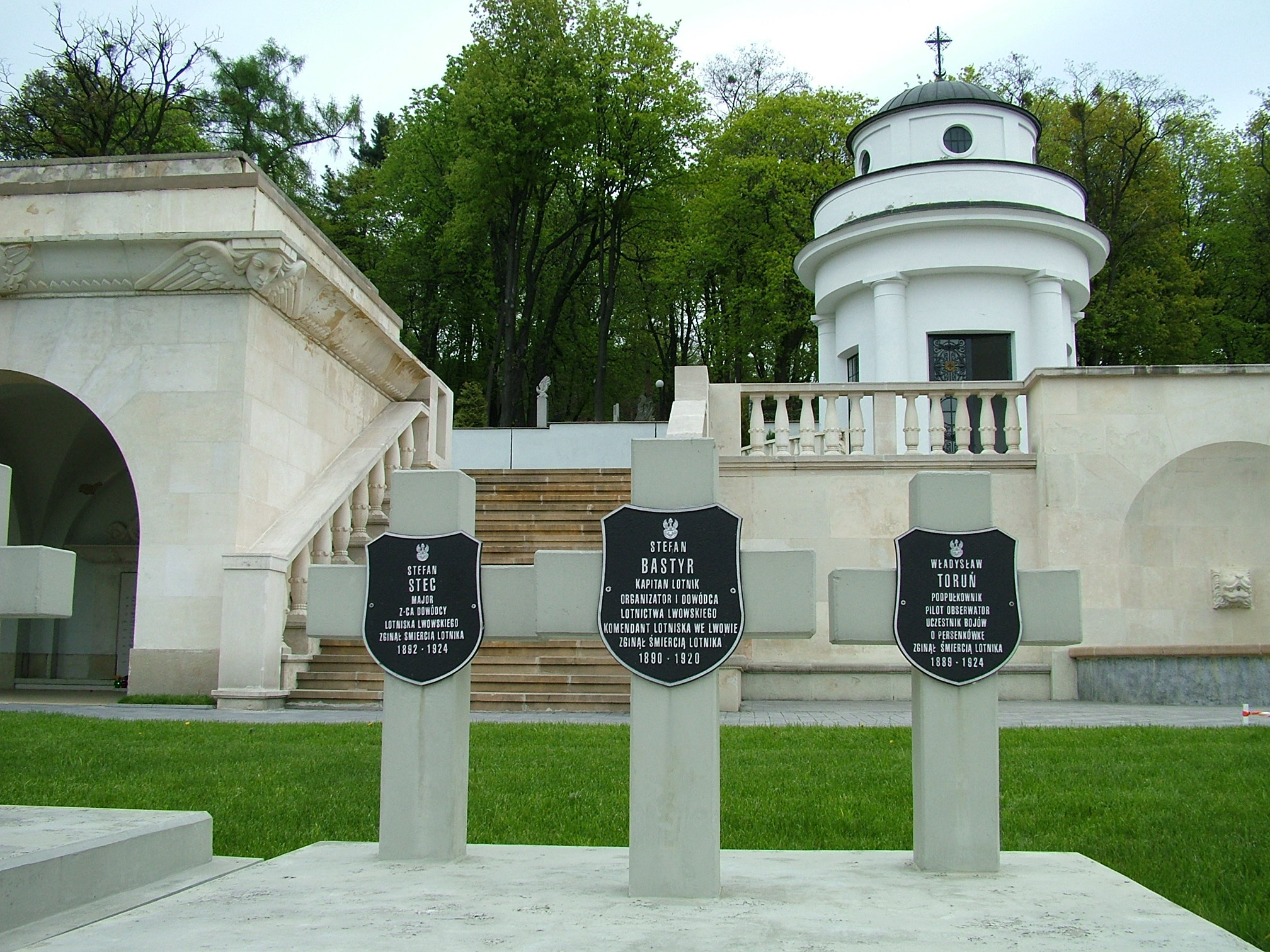
Tombs of Stefan Stec, Stefan Bastyr and Władysław Toruń

=== Lwów Defenders' Cemetery ===
The Cemetery of the Defenders of Lwów (Cemetery of Eaglets, Polish: Cmentarz Orląt Lwowskich) is a memorial and a burial place for Poles and their allies who died in Lviv during the hostilities of the Polish-Ukrainian War (1918−1919) and Polish-Soviet War (1919−1921).

The complex is a part of the Lychakiv Cemetery. There are about 3000 graves in that part of the cemetery; some from the Lwów Eaglets young militia volunteers, after whom that part of the cemetery is named. It was one of the most famous necropolises of interwar Poland. Lviv was a city in interwar Poland and at the time named Lwów.

In 1925, the ashes of one of the unknown defenders of Lwów were transferred to the Tomb of the Unknown Soldier in Warsaw. After that was built the «Polish mausoleum» (Lwów Eaglets Memorial).

After World War II the cemetery of Lwów Eaglets was completely destroyed and turned into a truck depot. At one time Eaglets Cemetery was damaged with a bulldozer.

Due to the complex history of Polish-Ukrainian relations, the Polish Eaglets Cemetery was neglected because the Ukrainian authorities did not want to rebuild this monument of young Polish soldiers. Though in the late 1980s, workers of a Polish company which were working in Khmelnytskyi started to redecorate and rebuild the necropolis from its ruins (which was not always legal according to Ukrainian law). Although the Ukrainian authorities tried to stop the works several times, the Poles managed to renovate this important memorial to the city's Polish defenders.

Since 1999 there is also a monument to the Sich Riflemen located just outside the Polish mausoleum.

Since the fall of communism, the cemetery has been rebuilt and refurbished. It was finally reopened on 24 June 2005.

=== 1863 January rebels' hill ===
In the back part of the cemetery (No. 6 on the plan) on a separate field indicated original steel crosses, located «1863 rebels' hill». Buried here are members Polish January Uprising of 1863, of which a member of the Polish Central National Committee Bronisław Szwarce, the famous zoologist Benedykt Dybowski, resting under the central monument alongside rebel Shimon Vizunas Shidlovsky.

=== Other veterans' sections ===
There are also numerous parts of the cemetery in which veterans of most wars of the 19th and 20th centuries are buried, including the quarters of veterans of:

- November Uprising (1830−1831)
- World War I
- Polish Defensive War (1939)
- Victims of the NKVD (1941)
- World War II

== Notable people ==
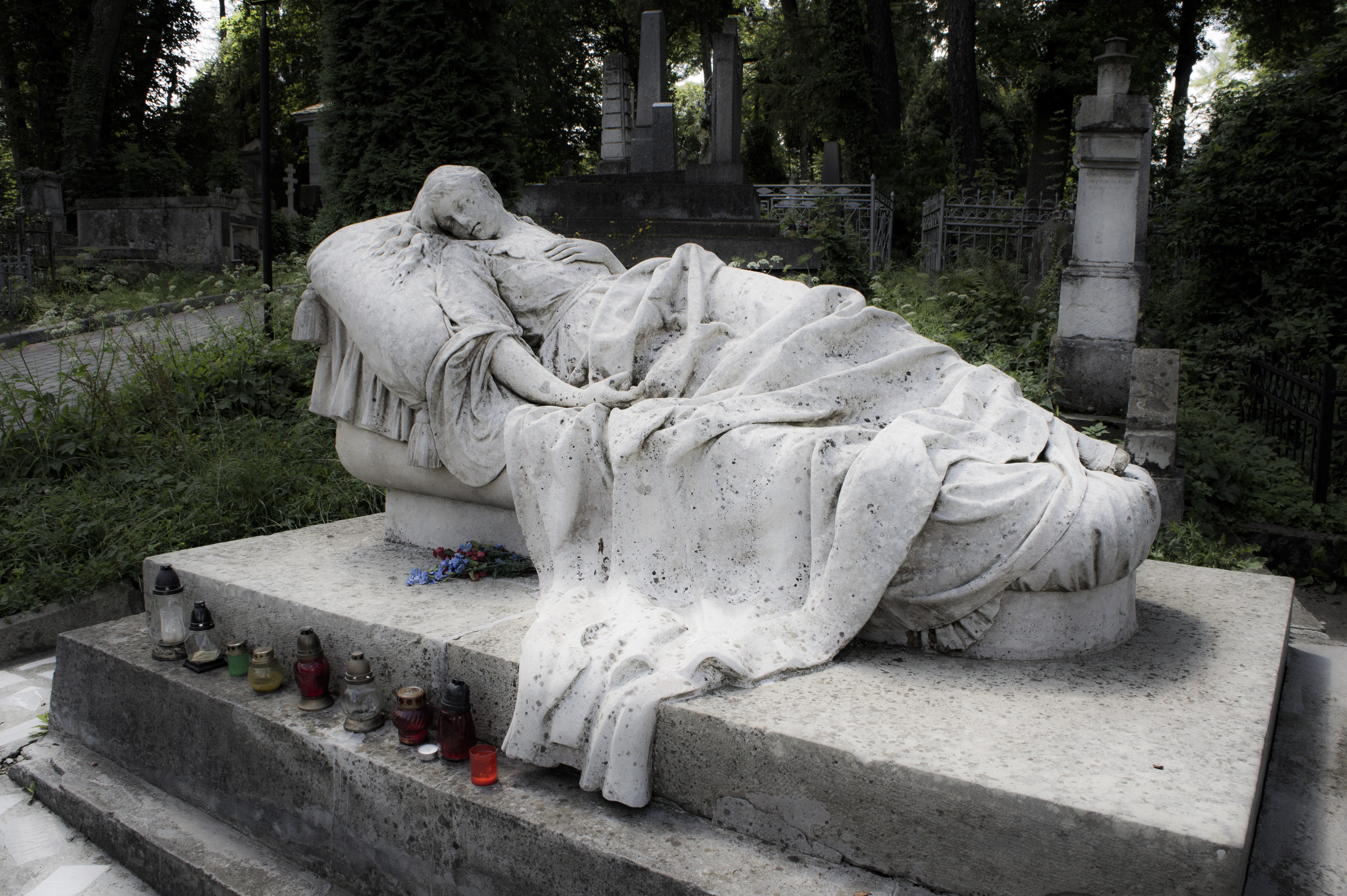
Grave of Józefina Markowska by Julian Markowski

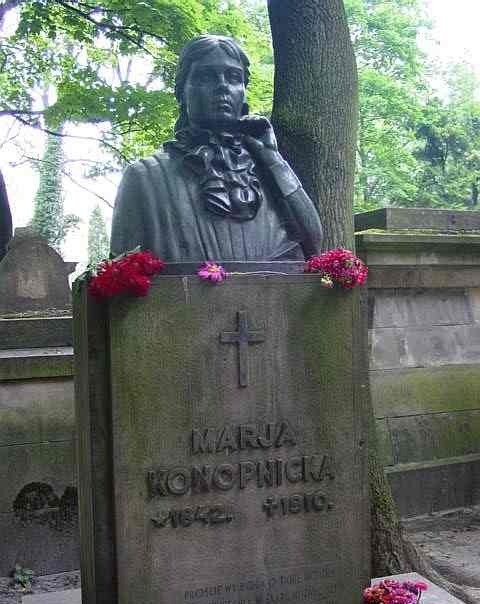
Tomb of Maria Konopnicka. Sculpture by Luna Drexlerówna.

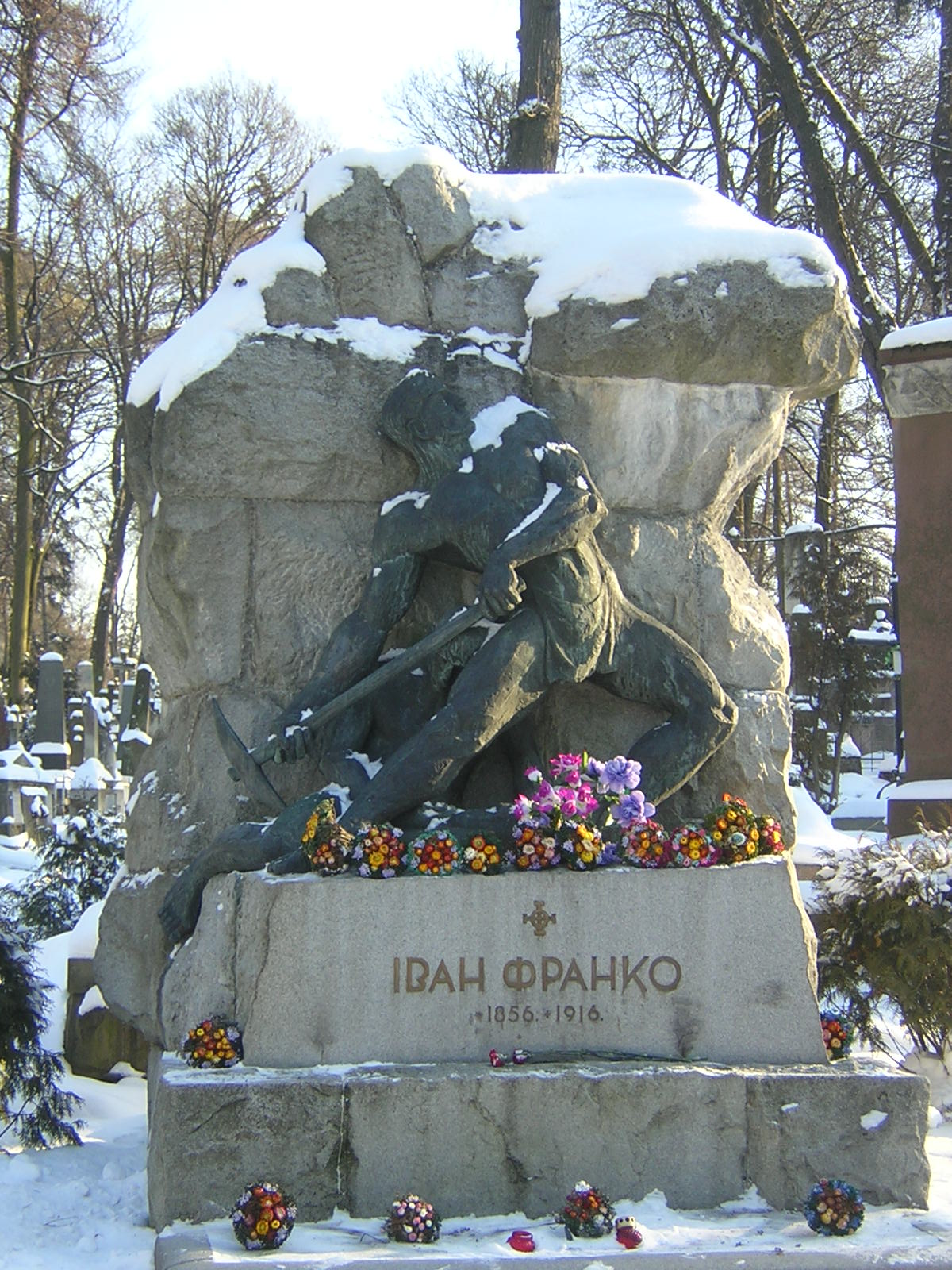
Tomb of the poet Ivan Franko.

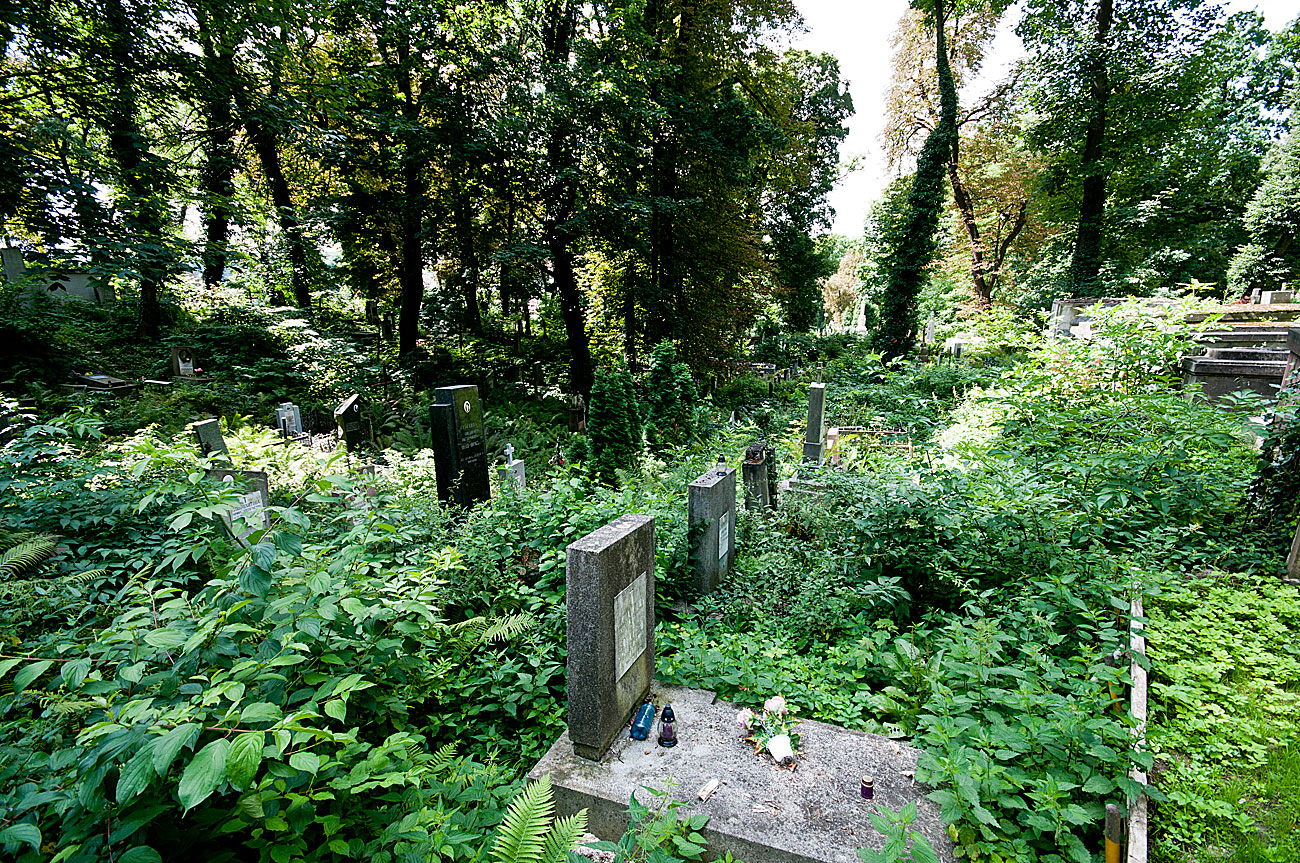
Lychakiv Cemetery (2011)

=== Poles ===
Since the city for centuries used to be a centre of Polish culture, there are numerous famous Poles buried there. Among them are:

- Roman Abraham, general
- Stefan Banach, mathematician
- Wladyslaw Belza, writer
- Piotr Chmielowski, philosopher
- Benedykt Dybowski, soldier, adventurer, ethnologist and biologist
- Mieczysław Garsztka, aviator
- Mieczysław Gębarowicz, historian
- Franciszek Ksawery Godebski, historian
- Zygmunt Gorgolewski, architect, designer of the Lviv Opera
- Seweryn Goszczyński, poet
- Artur Grottger, artist
- Zygmunt Janiszewski, mathematician
- Jan Nepomucen Kamiński, founder of the first theatre in Lwów
- Wojciech Kętrzyński, historian and name-sake of the city of Kętrzyn
- Maria Konopnicka, writer
- Juliusz Konstanty Ordon, officer
- Bronisław Radziszewski, chemist
- Tadeusz Rozwadowski, military leader and one of the founders of modern Poland
- Ludwik Rydygier, surgeon
- Władysław Sadłowski, architect
- Kazimierz Sichulski, painter
- Karol Szajnocha, historian
- Julian Zachariewicz, architect
- Gabriela Zapolska, novelist and playwright

=== Ukrainians ===
Among the notable Ukrainians buried there are:

- Dmytro Andriievsky, political activist and publicist
- Oleksander Barvinsky, academician, politician.
- Vasyl Barvinsky, impressionist composer
- Yevheniya Barvinska, pianist, choral conductor, singer
- Roman Bezpalkiv, Ukrainian painter
- Taras Bobanych, Ukrainian lawyer and soldier
- Hryhorii Chubai, Ukrainian poet, father of Taras Chubai
- Ivan Franko, poet and reformer of the Ukrainian language
- Yaroslav Halan, playwright and publicist
- Mykhailo Halushchynskyi, educator and political activist, member of the Senate of Poland
- Jacques Hnizdovsky, painter, printmaker, sculptor, bookplate designer and illustrator of numerous books, both in Ukrainian and English
- Volodymyr Ivasyuk, composer
- Mykhaylo Kobryn, theologian
- Solomiya Krushelnytska, soprano opera star
- Lesya Kryvytska, actress
- Stepan Kubiv, Ukrainian banking executive and politician
- Taras Levkiv, Ukrainian artist who specialized in ceramics
- Stanyslav Lyudkevych, composer
- Oleksander Ohonovsky, lawyer, civic leader
- Anthony Petrushevych, historian and philologist.
- Andriy Parubiy, politician
- Markiyan Shashkevych, poet
- Yurii Shukhevych, political prisoner and politician
- Myroslav Skoryk, Ukrainian composer
- Yuriy Starosol'skyi, Chief Scout of Plast from 1972 to 1991
- Oleksandr Tysowskyj (alternately Alexander Tysovsky), founder of Ukrainian Scouting
- Sydir Tverdokhlib, poet and politician
- Anatole Vakhnianyn, composer and leading cultural figure
- Iryna Vilde (Polotniuk), Ukrainian writer
- Borys Voznytsky, hero of Ukraine, academician, director of the Lviv National Gallery

=== Others ===
- Edmund Pike Graves, pilot and member of the Kościuszko Squadron

== Gallery ==
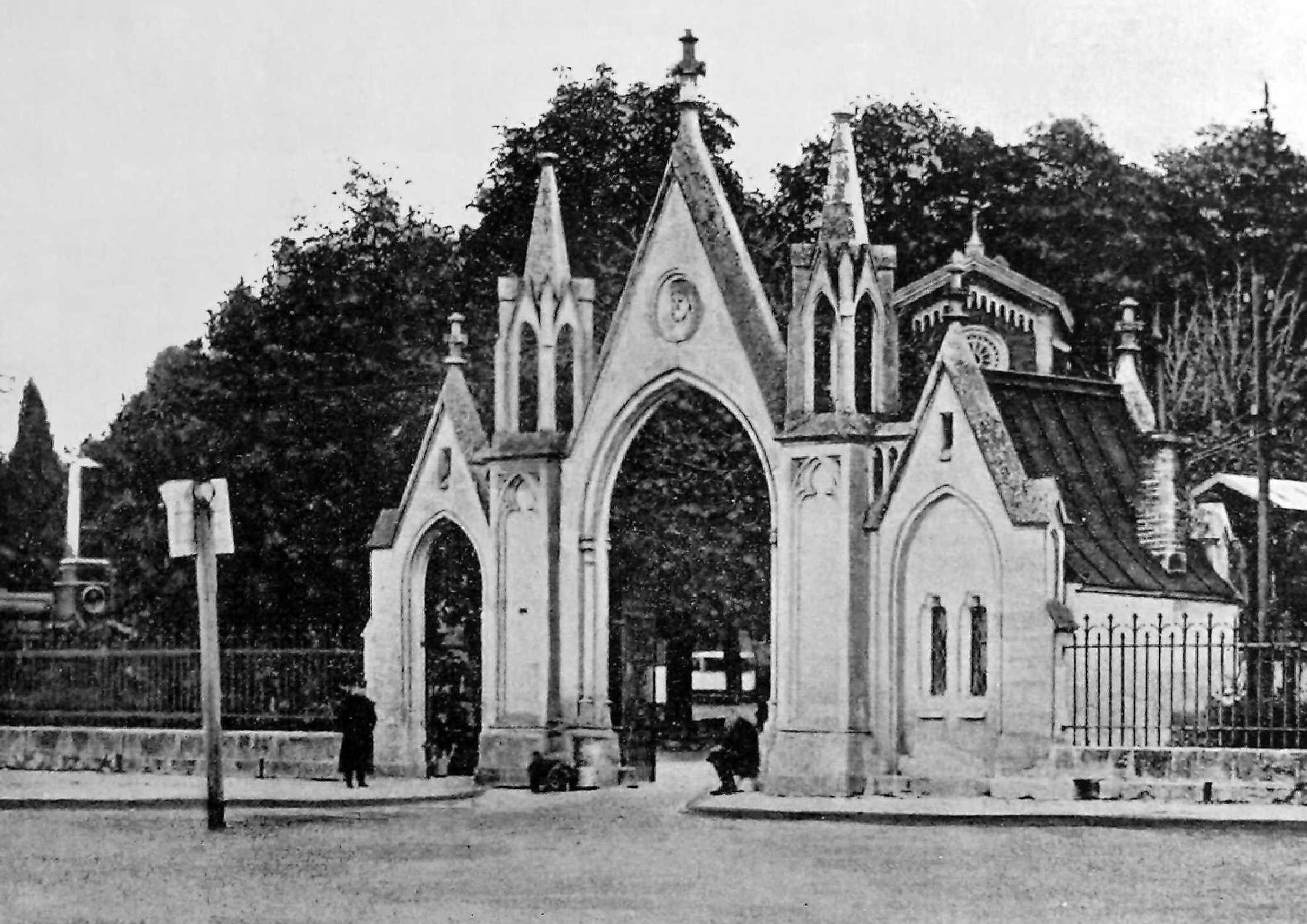
Lychakiv Cemetery – main gate (c.a. 1900)

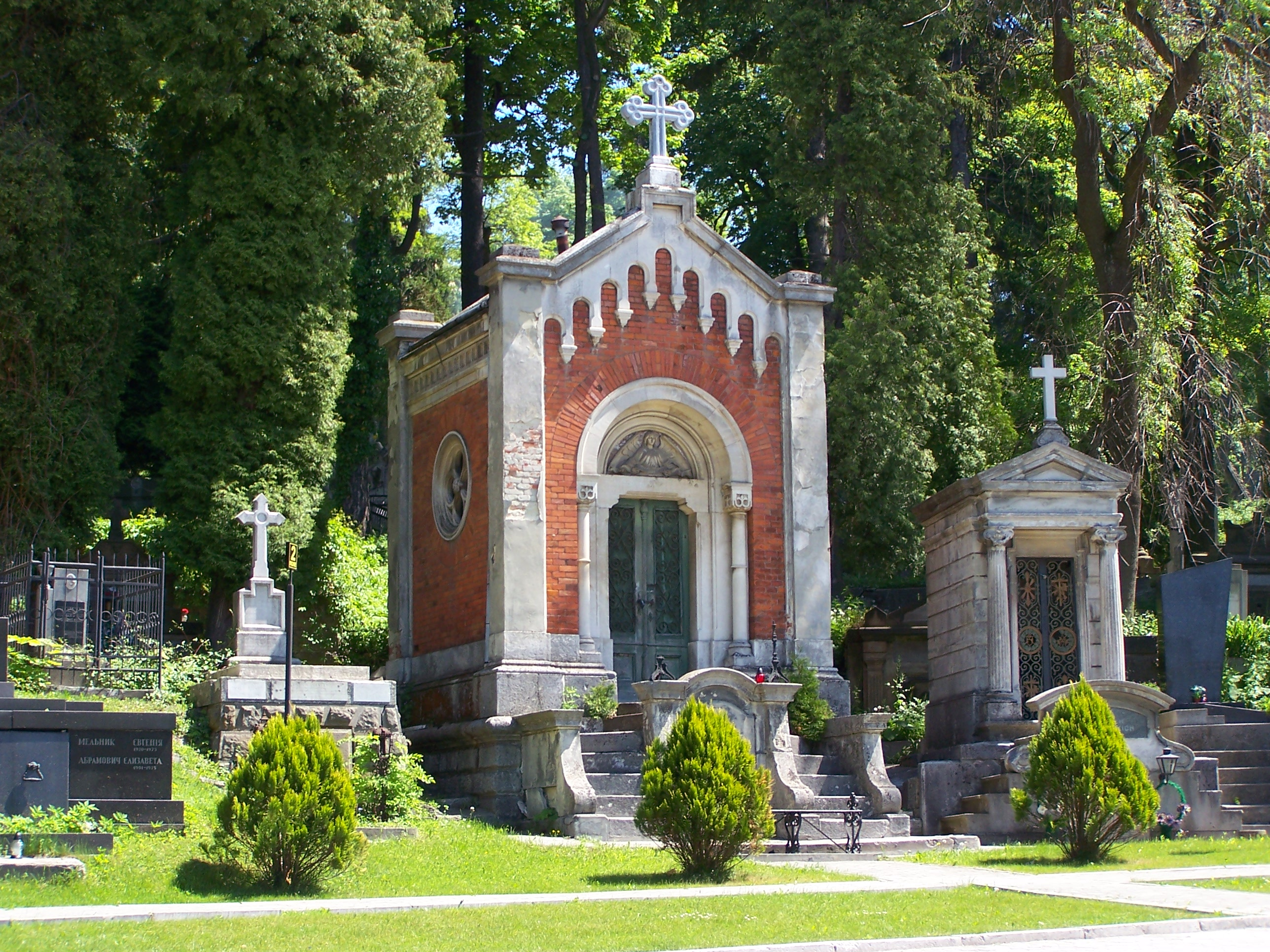
Mausoleum of Kiselka family by Filip Pokutyński

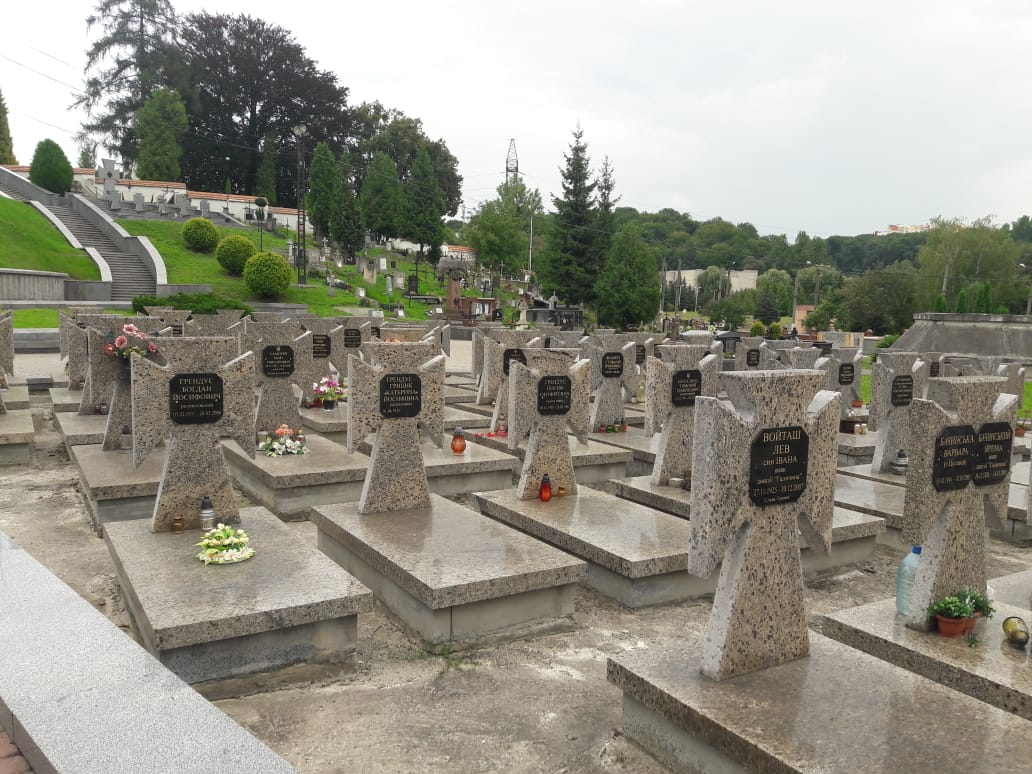
Lychakiv Cemetery (2018)
