= Pidliute =

Scenic and historic area, Western Ukraine

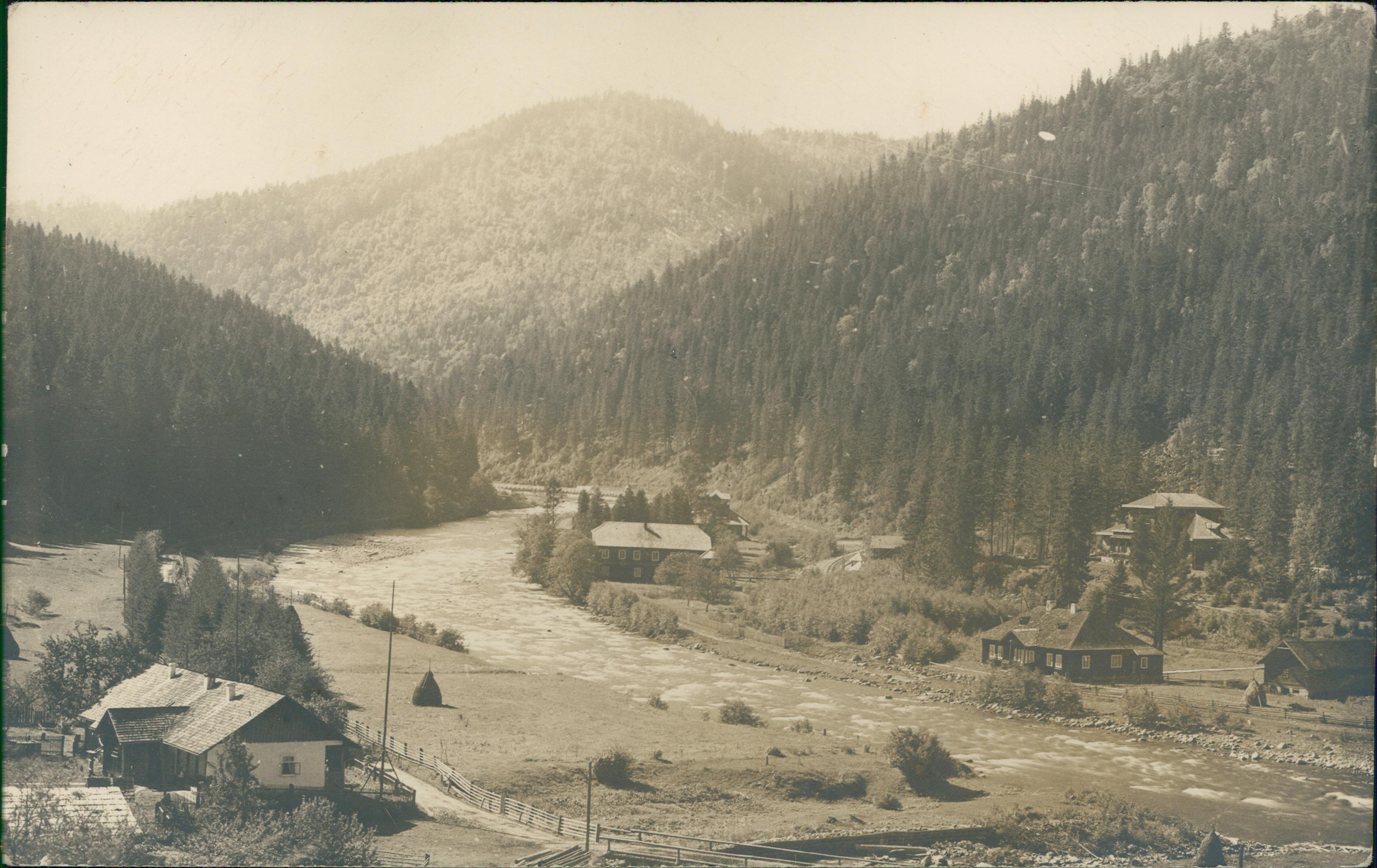
The view of the Pidlute tract (circa 1930)

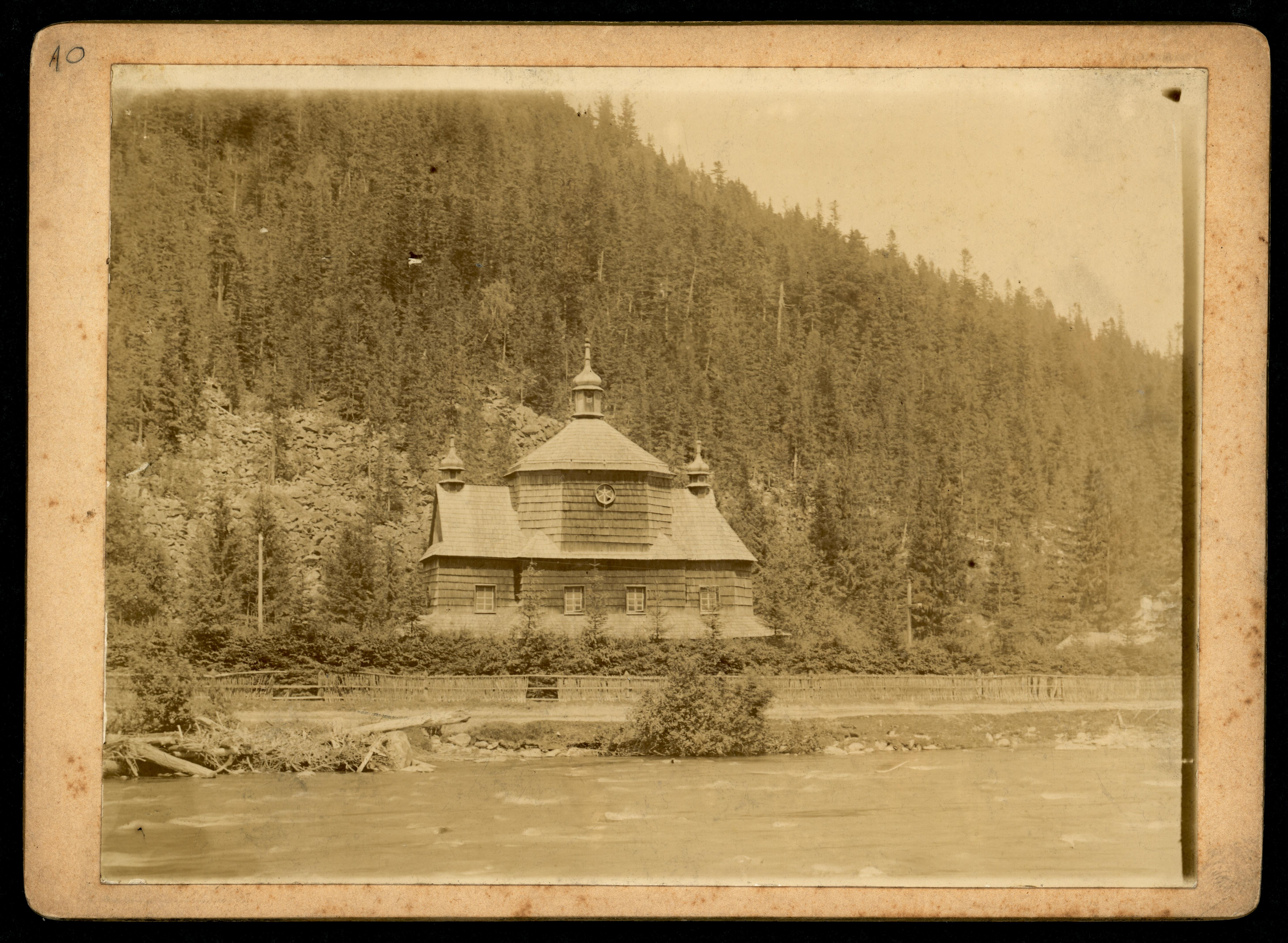
The view of the Wooden Church of St. John the Forerunner (between 1910 and 1914)

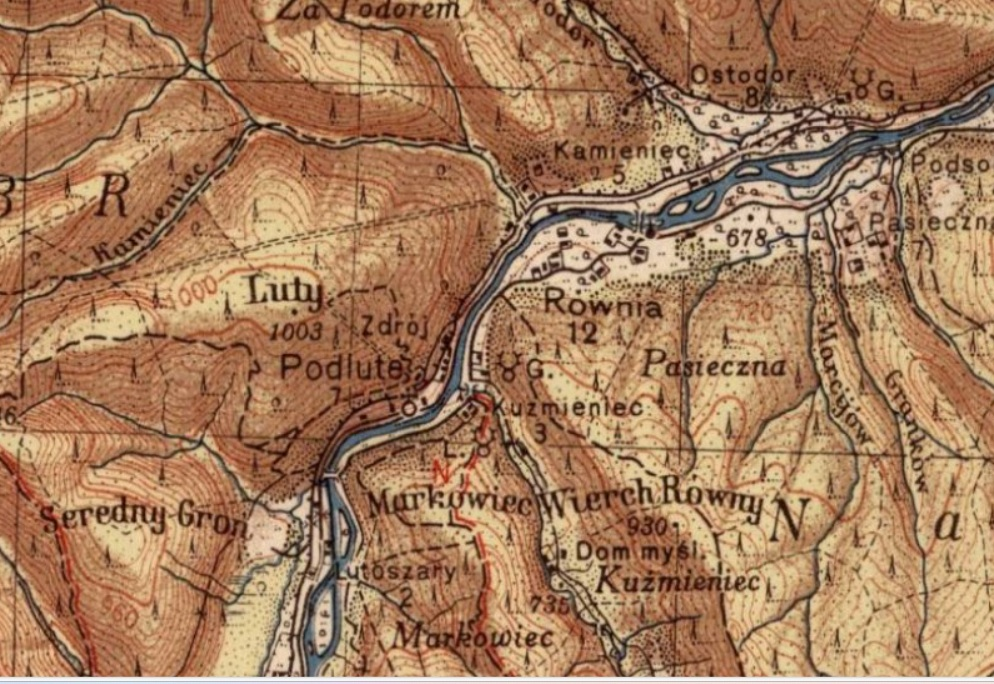
Pidliute on the map.

The Pidliute or Podlyute Tract is a picturesque and historic area located in the Gorgany mountain range of the Ukrainian Carpathians, near the village of Osmoloda in the Kalush Raion of the Ivano-Frankivsk Oblast.

== History ==
=== Founding and Interwar Period ===
The Pidliute tract, situated in a picturesque mountain area, had no permanent local population. Its history as a health resort began in 1809, when Metropolitan Antin Anhelovych was cured of rheumatism here. In the late 19th century, the "Kedrovi Palaty" complex was founded on this site, serving as a summer residence and health center for Greek Catholic metropolitans.

Construction was initiated by UGCC Metropolitan Sylvester Sembratovych, who purchased six hectares of Liuta Hora in 1892. He chose this location due to the presence of mineral springs. Three pools were set up for treatment and relaxation based on these springs: "Sylvester", "Andrey", and "Tyt". To make it easier for aristocrats from all over Austria-Hungary (and later Poland) to get to the tract, the Broshniv-Osmoloda narrow-gauge railway was laid, which is now completely destroyed.

Pidliute was used to treat stomach ailments and rheumatism. Every summer, the tract became a place of rest for Metropolitan Andrey Sheptytsky. He worked here on Pastoral Letters, conducted spiritual practices (confessed the faithful in a stone grotto from the late 19th century, which was crowned with a cross), and treated his ailing legs. In addition, the Metropolitan served in the local wooden church of St. John the Forerunner, which was later destroyed during the Soviet period. Among others who spent their summer vacations here were Volodymyr and Hermina Shukhevych, Teofil Berezhnytskyi, and Volodymyr and Dariia Starosolskyi.

In the summer of 1909, Metropolitan Andrey Sheptytsky and the artist Oleksa Novakivskyi met here. Interested in the artist's talent, the Metropolitan became his patron and supported Novakivsky's creative work until the end of his life.

In 1913, the prominent physician Yevhen Ozarkevych warned tourists who wanted to visit the Pidliute tract, writing that "...anyone who wants to go to Pidliute for treatment should remember that this is not a public place but the exclusive property of the Metropolitan. And one can only get there if the Metropolitan wills it...".

During World War I, as a result of artillery shelling by Russian troops during the Brusilov offensive in 1915, the "Kedrovi Palaty" buildings were significantly damaged.

==== Plast's Activities ====
In 1924–1925, senior Plast scouts held camps in the Pidliute tract. The boys stayed in an abandoned stable of the "Kedrovi Palaty" near the Kamianets stream, while the girls camped in the sanatorium building.

The camp for senior scouts moved to Mount Sokil, located 3 kilometers from the Pidliute tract. This location was chosen for its natural features: a sparse forest and a flat summit, which made it suitable for camping. The land for the camp was donated by Metropolitan Andrey Sheptytsky, who transferred ownership to the Lviv "Society for the Care of Youth." In 1926, with the support of the Metropolitan, who provided the necessary timber, craftsmen and scouts built four camp houses styled after traditional Hutsul "grazhda". From then on, camps were held here regularly, two or three times each summer season. It is known that Metropolitan Andrey Sheptytsky visited the camp in 1929 and 1930.

The Polish authorities officially banned Plast's activities on their territory on 21 September 1930. Despite this, the camp on Mount Sokil continued to function until 1939, but as a place for summer educational camps for youth rather than a Plast center. Today, Ukrainian Plast scouts are once again organizing camps near the Pidliute tract, continuing the tradition.

=== Reconstruction of the Residence ===
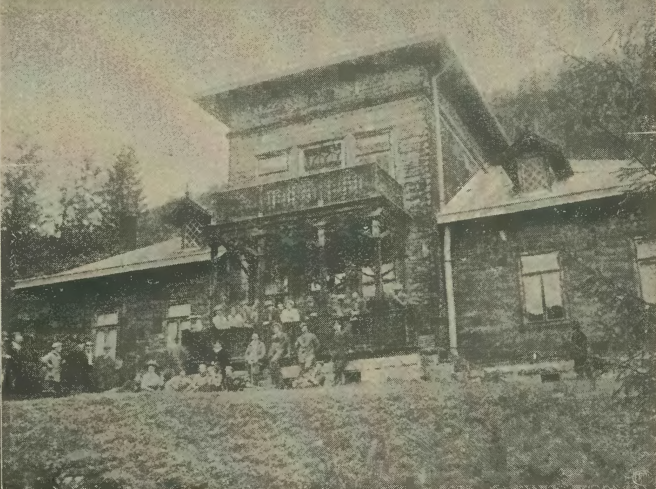
Kedrovi Palaty in 1928–1929.

In the 1930s, Metropolitan Andrey Sheptytsky initiated the reconstruction of the residence. Local spruce wood was used for construction. The only exception was a large veranda, which craftsmen made from cedar as a surprise gift for the Metropolitan. This act was especially significant, as Sheptytsky himself would never have agreed to spend money on his own comfort [1][2].

In 1936, the newspaper "Dilo" wrote about the restored residence: "The Palace looks like a golden bonbonniere and is already welcoming its Beloved Guest, who has come to rest a little after his immeasurable labors".

The area was also used for hunting by the Austrian Count Pál Pálffy, who leased hunting grounds around the "Kedrovi Palaty".

Historical moments and life at the Pidliute tract are captured in many photographs, a significant number of which were taken by Yaroslav Koval. In this area, he also photographed Oleksa Novakivskyi, Iryna Vilde, the Metropolitan's brother Klymentiy Sheptytsky, UHA General Myron Tarnavsky, and other famous personalities.

=== Soviet Period ===
With the arrival of Soviet rule, the cross on the grotto was replaced with a sculpture of a deer. During this period, the tract became a place of recreation and hunting for party officials from Kyiv and Moscow, including Nikita Khrushchev, Petro Shelest, and Volodymyr Shcherbytsky. In 1949, the "Kedrovi Palaty" was first destroyed by fire, but it was rebuilt.

In the 1970s, when the "Kedrovi Palaty" served as a dacha for the Chairman of the Supreme Soviet of the USSR, Nikolai Podgorny, the complex almost completely burned down in 1978, but it was rebuilt in 1987.

=== Current State ===
At the initiative of Bishop Sofron Mudry of the Ivano-Frankivsk Eparchy of the UGCC, who actively sought the return of the tract to the Church, the process of restoring the "Kedrovi Palaty" began. Thanks to his meetings with then-President of Ukraine Leonid Kuchma, a presidential decree was issued in 1999, which restored historical justice and transferred Pidliute to the Ivano-Frankivsk Archeparchy of the UGCC. Today, it operates as the Andrey Sheptytsky Retreat Center.

The complex was fully restored in 2004. The "Kedrovi Palaty" was renovated using fir and pine. A church was built on the old foundations, and, like the restored chapel-grotto, it was decorated with mosaics made of Italian stone. The mosaic work was performed by Father Yevhen Andrukhiv, who gained the relevant skills while studying in Rome with the assistance of Bishop Sofron Mudry.

The stone deer sculpture, a reminder of the Soviet period, was left but moved. A wooden cross and a cornerstone were installed in its place, symbolizing the revival of the complex's metropolitan history.

To mark the 150th anniversary of the birth of UGCC Metropolitan Andrey Sheptytsky, road services in the Rozhniativ Raion carried out intensified repair work on the Kalush-Osmoloda highway.

== Bibliography ==
- "Podluty". Geographical Dictionary of the Kingdom of Poland (in Polish). 8. Warszawa: Kasa im. Józefa Mianowskiego. 1887. p. 431.
