= Tverdokhlib =

Tverdokhlib (Ukrainian: Твердохліб) is a Ukrainian surname. Notable people with the surname include:

- Marharyta Tverdokhlib (born 1991), Ukrainian long jumper
- Oleh Tverdokhlib (1969–1995), Ukrainian hurdler
- Sydir Tverdokhlib (1886–1922), Ukrainian poet, translator and politician
- Yehor Tverdokhlib (born 2000), Ukrainian footballer
