= Action of 29 April 1919 =

1919 air battle

- Part of Polish–Ukrainian War
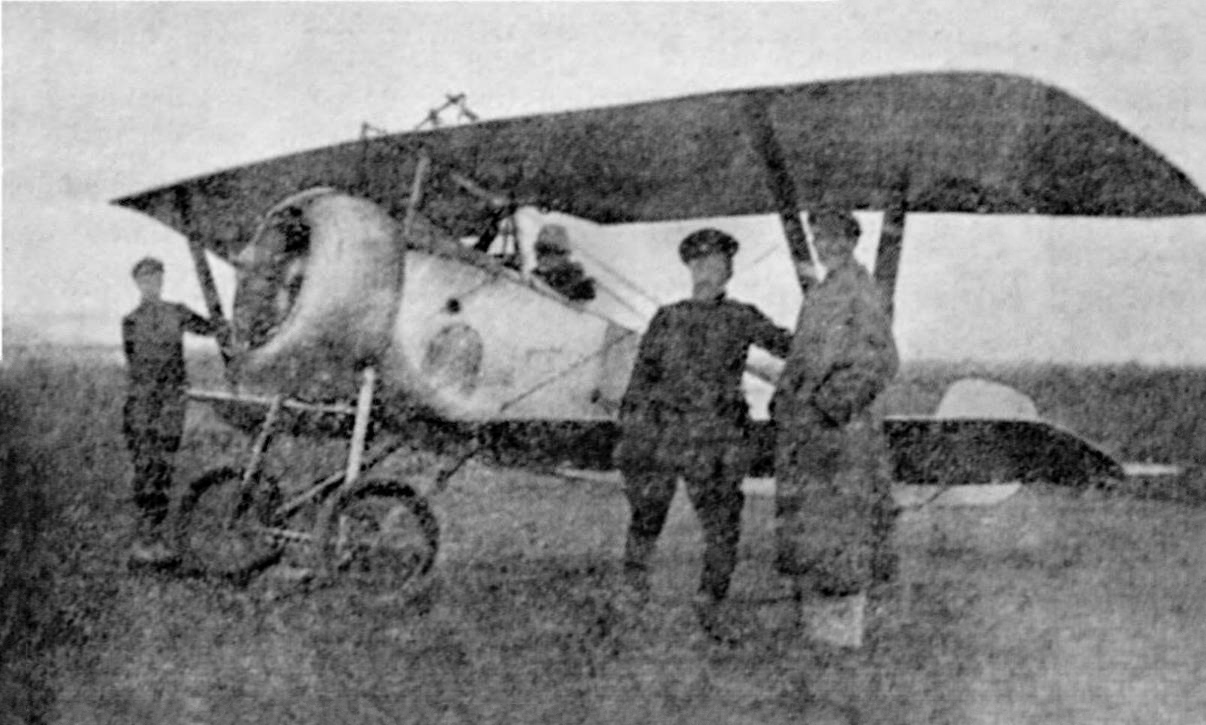
- Nieuport 17 of Ukrainian Galician Army
Date	29 April 1919
Location	Near Lviv, Eastern Galicia
Result	Disputed (See § Aftermath)

Belligerents
West Ukrainian People's Republic	Second Polish Republic

Commanders and leaders
Franz Rudorfer or M. Serikov; Lieutenant Sheparovych; Lieutenant Klisz	Stefan Stec

Units involved
UGA aviation regiment	7-th air squadron of the Polish Armed Forces

Strength
See § Strength	See § Strength

Casualties and losses
See § Casualties	See § Casualties

The Action of 29 April 1919 (Ukrainian: Повітряний бій 29 квітня 1919) was an air battle between Polish aviation led by Stefan Stec and several Ukrainian planes during the Polish–Ukrainian War. Several different interpretations were issued describing this battle.

== Background ==
=== Polish forces ===
Polish sources do not explicitly mention the number of Polish planes participating in the battle. Ukrainian pilot Rudolf Zemyk mentioned in his memoirs that the attack was carried out by eight Polish planes, while the Ukrainians had 3 of them. This report of the number of Polish planes, however, is considered to be an exaggeration. Other researchers put this number as 1 and 3.

=== Ukrainian forces ===
According to some researchers, 3 Ukrainian planes were involved, specifically 2 Brandenburgs and 1 Nieuport XVII. Przybyła and some Ukrainian authors, meanwhile, claim that two Ukrainian planes were involved. (Note: While Jan Przybyła claims that the battle consisted of a Polish attack on two Ukrainian planes, Ukrainian sources claim that the attack by 8 Polish planes on 2 Ukrainian ones took place.)

== Battle ==
According to Jan Przybyła, the battle took place at 10 am. A Polish Fokker D.VIII, piloted by Stefan Stec, attacked two Ukrainian planes and forced the Nieuport to flee. He chased it for some time, while also firing his machine gun, until the plane started to fall and eventually disappeared. However, according to Viktor Kyreia, the battle took place at 3 pm. Pilot V. Serikov had set off from Krasne airport, fought three Polish planes and eventually forced them to withdraw. Another perspective on the battle, provided by Rudolf Zemyk, is that some Ukrainian planes were ambushed by Poles in the sky over Lviv, damaging one of them and forced to retreat.

== Aftermath ==
According to Jan Przybyła, the battle became one of the first Polish air victories, although some Ukrainian researchers view this battle as a Ukrainian success. This clash, however, was of a little importance and did not affect the course of the Polish–Ukrainian War, which ended in a Polish victory in July 1919.

== Casualties ==
Przybyła and Ukrainian historian Andriy Kharuk claim that the Ukrainian Nieuport was shot down and had probably crashed after it was severely damaged by the Polish Fokker. However, according to Kyreia's interpretation, the Ukrainians lost no planes and forced the Polish planes to withdraw, possibly damaging some of them by machine gun fire. Other sources claim that one of the Ukrainian planes was damaged, but not shot down.

== Bibliography ==
- Kyreia, Viktor (2017). Авіація Української Галицької Армії (1918–1920) – Істор. дисертація (PDF).
