= Polish Air Force checkerboard =

Marking for Polish Air Force

Polish Air Force checkerboard (1993 to present)

The Air Force checkerboard (Polish: szachownica lotnicza) is a national marking for the aircraft of the Polish Air Force, equivalent to roundels used in other nations' air forces. It consists of four equal squares, of which the upper left and lower right are white, and the other two – red. These are surrounded by a border of inverted (counterchanged) colors 1/5 the thickness of a single square. In 1993 the colors were reversed (i.e. white in the upper left).

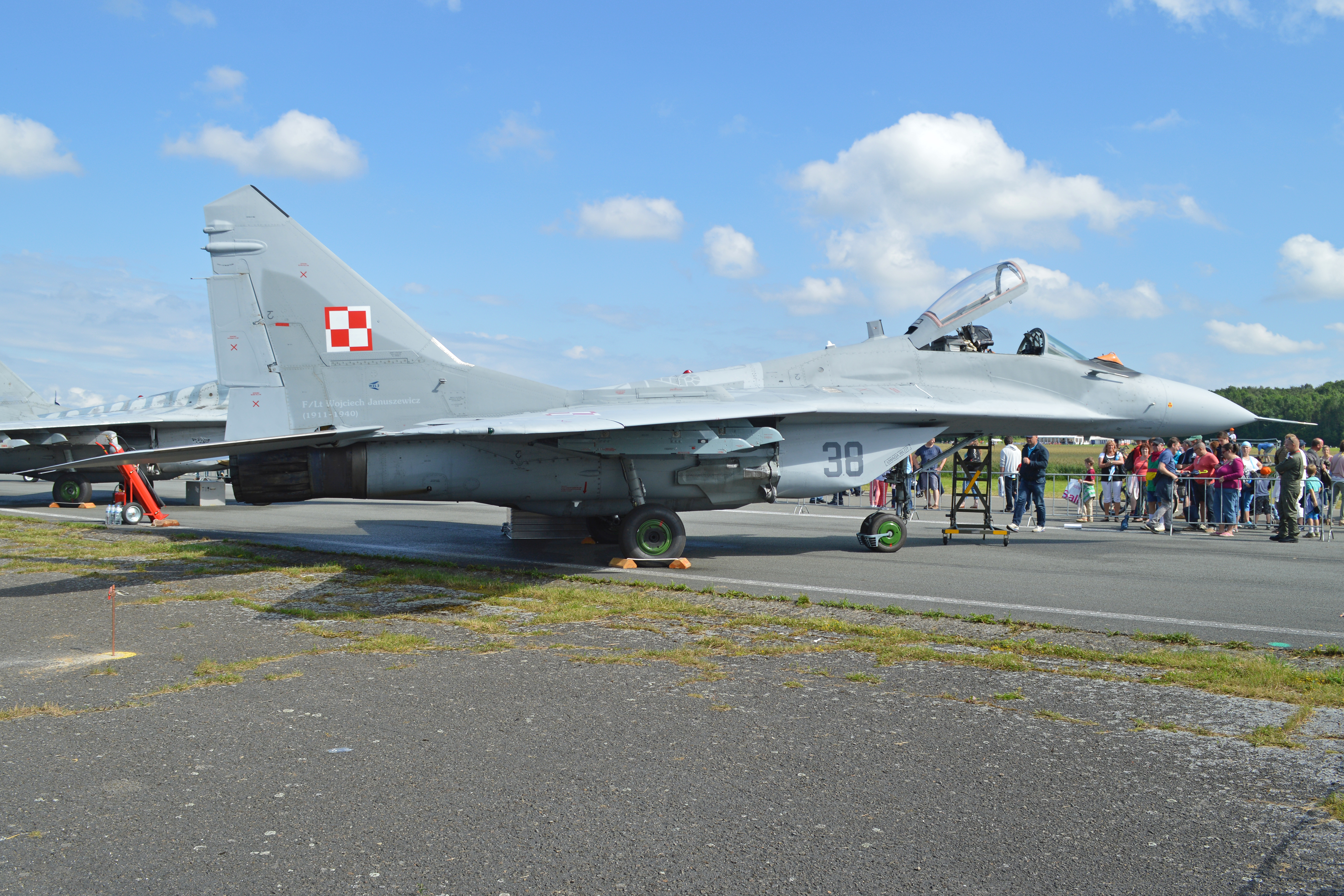
Checkerboard on a Mikoyan MiG-29 of the Polish Air Force

Initially, Polish military aircraft used various signs in national colors (red and white), most frequently shields party per bend, pale, or red letter "Z" in a white square. The four-field, red-white checkerboard, was first used as a personal insignia of the Polish fighter pilot Stefan Stec. It was adopted as the Polish national roundel on 1 December 1918.

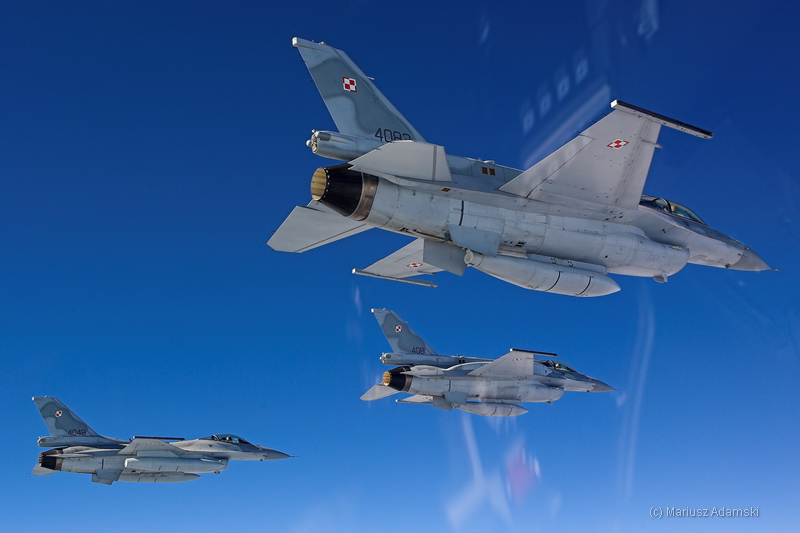
Polish Air Force F-16 being designated with checkerboards

Pre-checkerboard roundels used in 1918

in Warsaw

in Lwów

in Cracow (Kraków)

In 1921 a contrasting red and white border was added, but without specified dimensions. In 1930 the ratio of border to fields was fixed at 1:5. According to current regulations, an additional gray border can be added, 1:6 the size of the field, if the insignia is displayed on a white or red background.

Between the 1960s and 1980s the checkerboard (usually rotated 45 degrees) was also painted on turrets and hulls of Polish Army tanks and APCs. This tradition has since been discontinued.

In 1993 the color order was changed from red-dominant (red in the upper left) to white-dominant, to conform to heraldic rules, though ignoring the 70-year-old tradition. The first white-dominant checkerboard was used in 1940 in France.

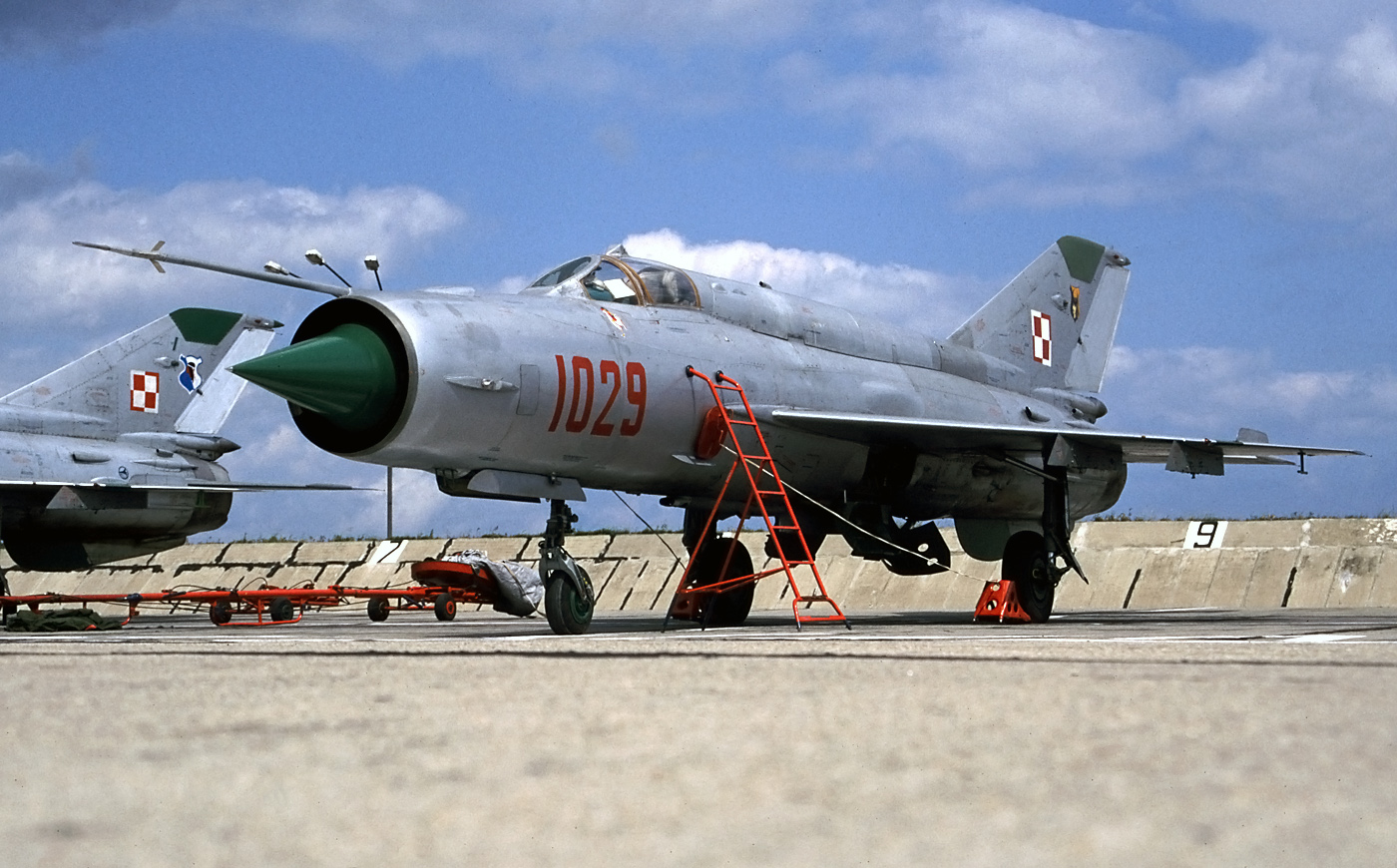
MiG-21 under Polish People's Republic era, using a reversed version of the checkerboard.

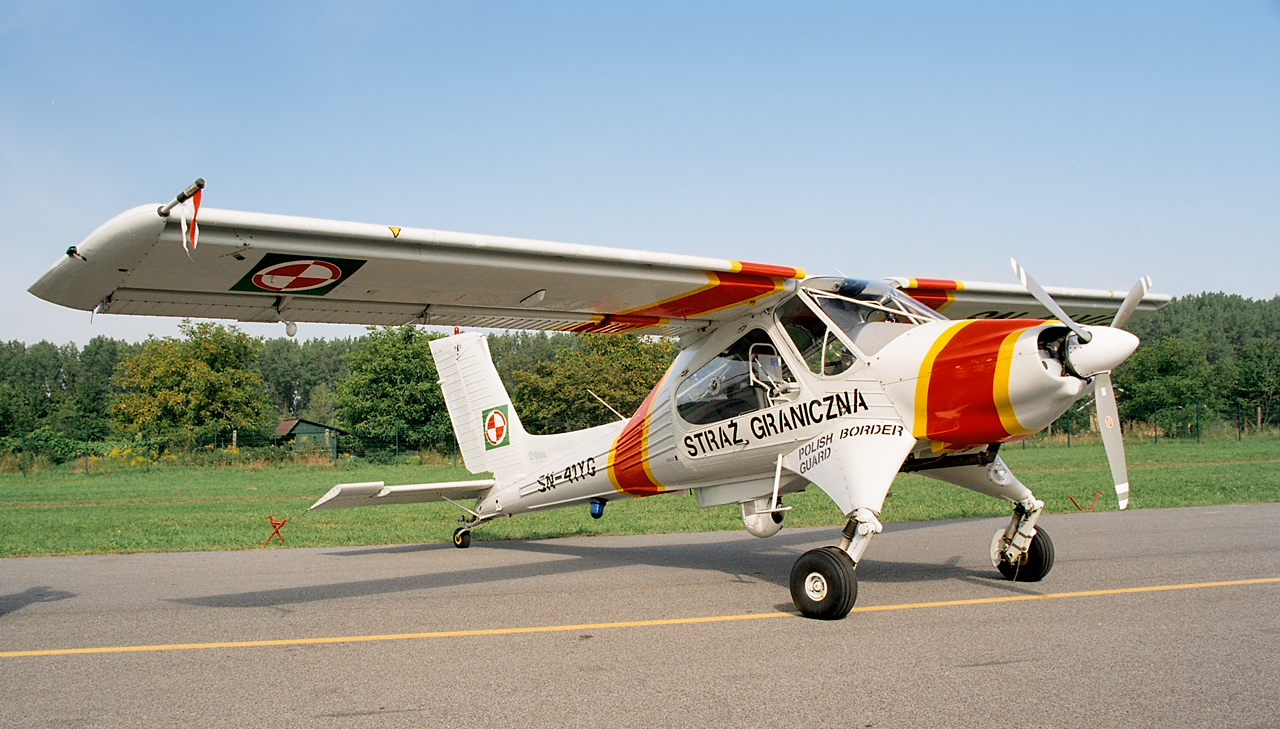
Polish Border Guard PZL-104M and its insignia.

== Heraldic rules ==
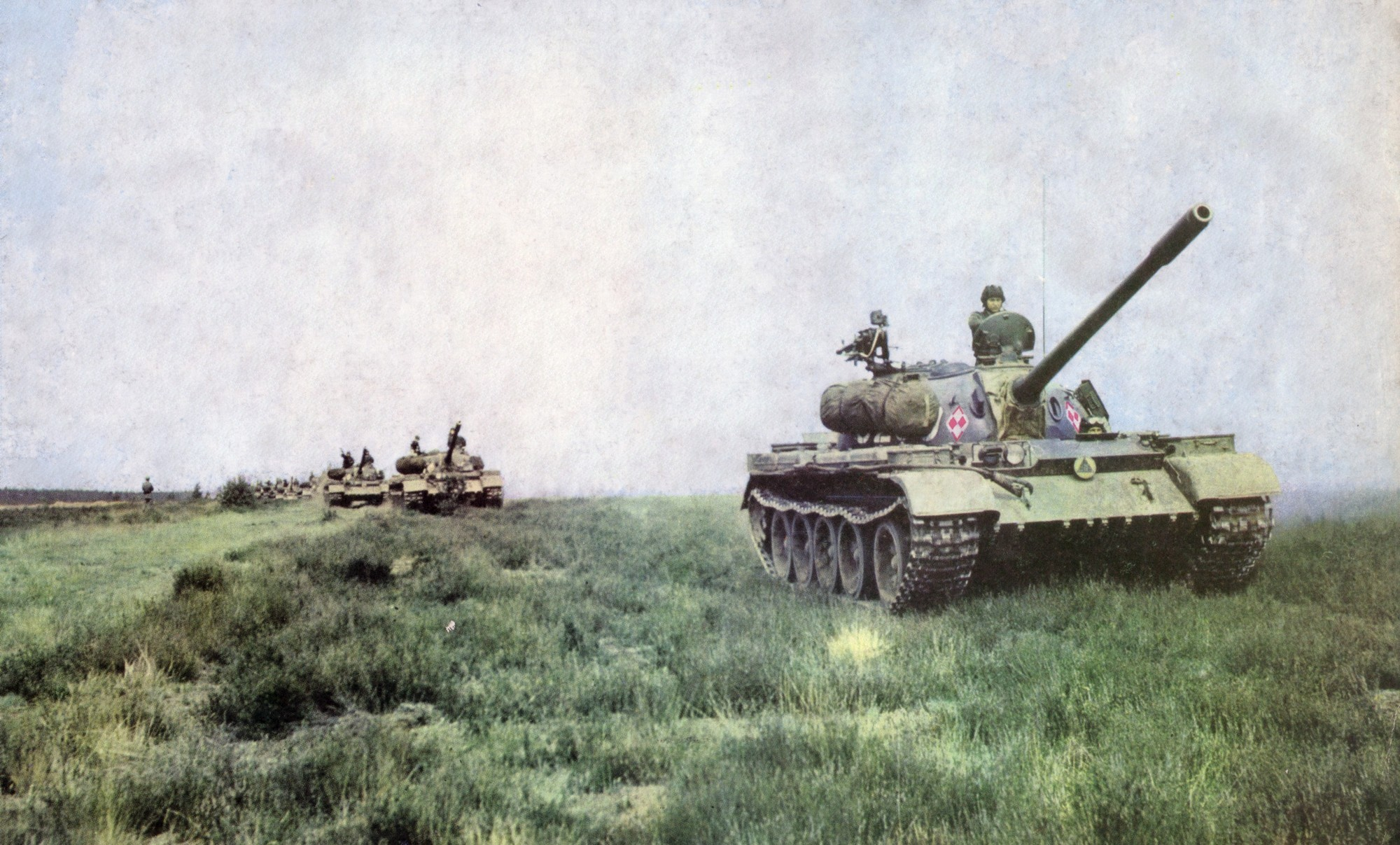
Polish People's Army T-54 main battle tanks with the Land Force's checkerboard.

In heraldry, the color of the charge (in this case the white of the Polish eagle) takes precedence over the shield (red in the case of the Polish coat of arms). Because of this, white should be given the most "dominant" or dignified position in a heraldic design representing Poland. In the case of a checkerboard, this would be the upper left corner. (When hung vertically the Polish flag should have white on the left for exactly the same reason). Note that this rule applies to the main color squares, not to the thin border, which is considered decoration.

=== Versions ===
Before 1921

1921–1993

Border Guard

Military Vehicles 1960–1980
