= Lesya Kryvytska =

Ukrainian actress

- Born: Oleksandra Serhiivna Yelyseyeva; 16 January 1899; Chyhyryn, Kiev Governorate, Russian Empire
- Died: 7 November 1983 (aged 84); Lviv, Ukrainian SSR, Soviet Union
- Occupation: Actress

Lesya Kryvytska, née Oleksandra Serhiivna Yelyseyeva (Ukrainian: Олександра Сергіївна Кривицька; 16 January 1899 – 7 November 1983) was a Soviet and Ukrainian stage actress and pedagogue. People's Artist of the Ukrainian SSR (1954).

== Early life and education ==
Oleksandra Kryvytska was born in Chyhyryn, Kiev Governorate, Russian Empire.

== Career ==
Kryvytska began her acting career in 1916 in the troupe of Serhii Pronsky. From 1918 she studied in the Theater school in Kyiv and at the same time worked at the Mykola Sadovsky Theater. In 1919–1920, she was an actress at the State National Theater of the Ukrainian People's Republic in Kamianets-Podilskyi which operated under the direction of Mykola Sadovsky. Together with the theater she went to Galicia, where she was interned in Dombie - a camp near Krakow.

In 1921–1922, Kryvytska returned to Soviet Ukraine and was admitted to the Ivan Franko Traveling Theater. She married Yakiv Kryvytsky and performed under the stage name Lesya Kryvytska. In 1922–1923, she worked at the Ukrainian Theater under the direction of Mykola Orel-Stepnyak. In 1924, Kryvytska worked at the Ukrainian Theater of Volodymyr Demchyshyn. From 1925 to 1927, she was playing at the Ukrainian Dnieper Theater. In 1927–1929, Kryvytska worked in the cooperative Ukrainian Theater under the direction of Joseph Stadnyk.

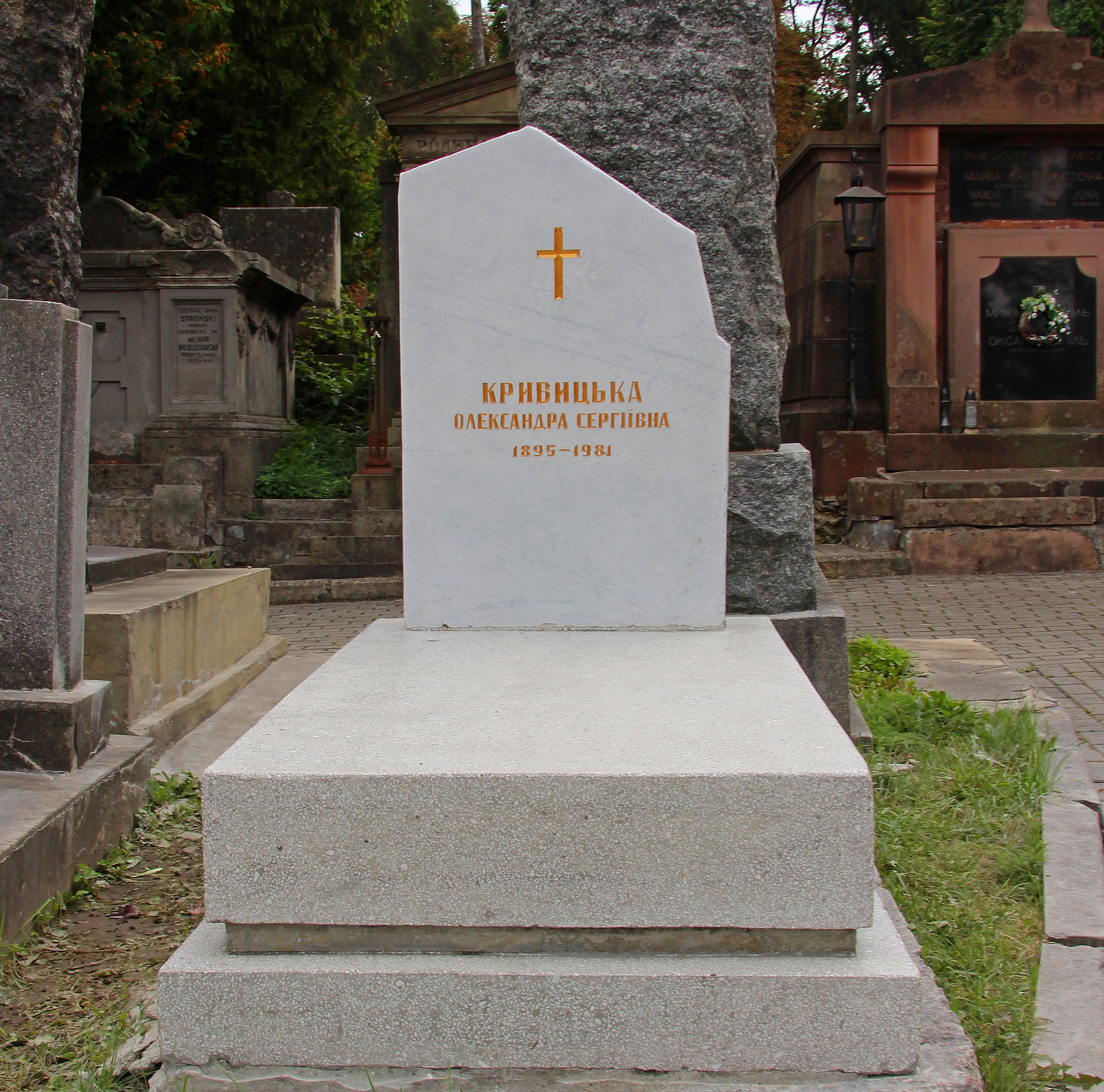
Lesya Kryvytska grave

From 1929 to 1934, Kryvytska worked at the Ukrainian Ivan Tobilevych Theater under the direction of Volodymyr Blavatsky. In 1934–1936, she played at the Zagrava Theater. In 1938 -1939, she worked at the Ukrainian National Ivan Kotliarevsky Theater. Since 1940, Kryvytska was an actress of Lviv Ukrainian Lesia Ukrainka Theater. During the German occupation from 1941 to 1944, she continued working at this theater. After the World War II until 1973, Kryvytska was the leading actress of the Lviv Ukrainian Maria Zankovetska Drama Theater.

In 1958, she published a book, Povist pro moye Zhyttya: Spogady Artustku (A Story of my Life: Memories of the Artist).

Lesya Kryvytska died on 7 November 1983 in her apartment in Lviv. She is buried at the Lychakiv Cemetery in Lviv.

== Awards and honors ==
In 1954, Kryvytska was awarded a title of People's Artist of the Ukrainian SSR. She was also awarded the Order of Lenin, Order of the Red Banner of Labour, and medals.
