= Osmoloda =

Rural locality in Ivano-Frankivsk Oblast, Ukraine

Osmoloda Осмолода
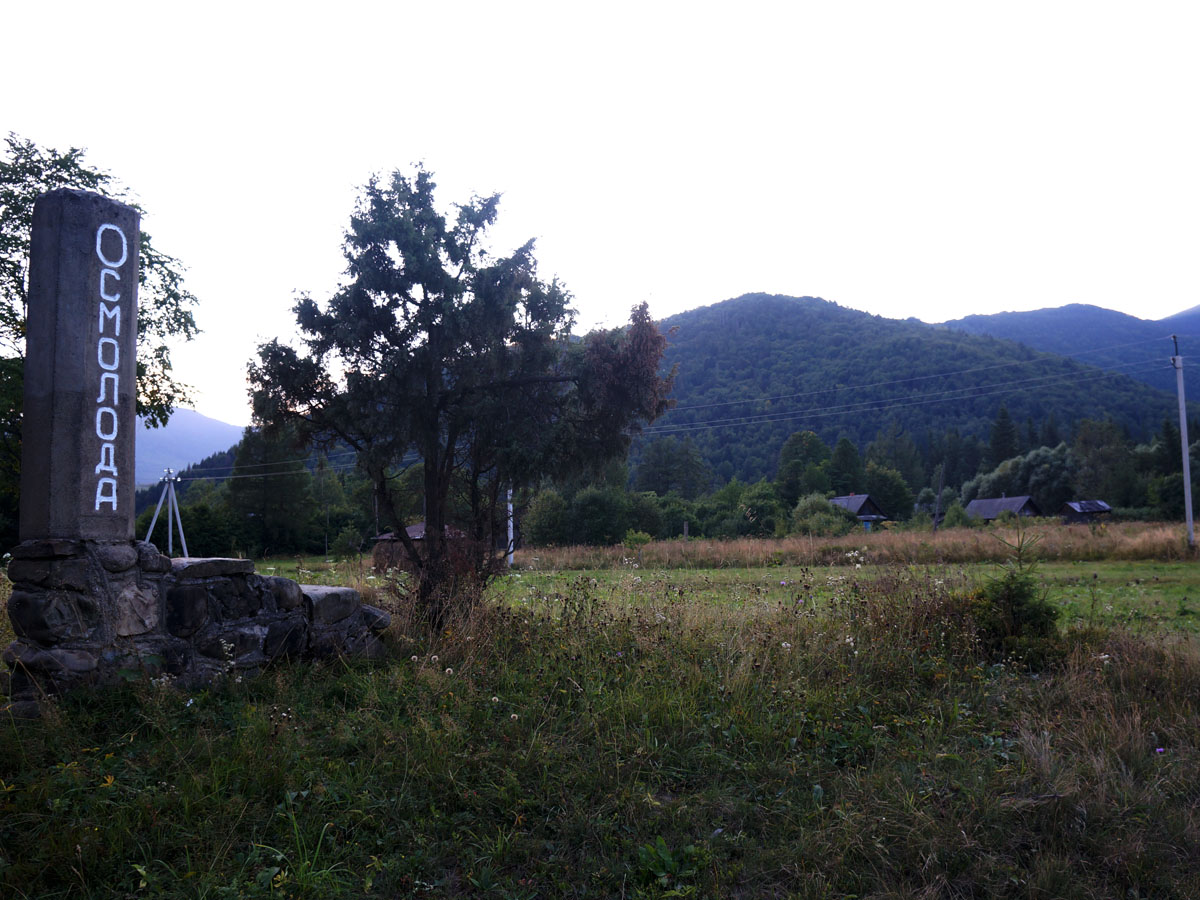

- Location in Ivano-Frankivsk Oblast Osmoloda (Ukraine)
- Coordinates: 48°34′54″N 24°2′58″E
- Country: Ukraine
- Oblast: Ivano-Frankivsk Oblast
- Raion: Kalush Raion
- Hromada: Perehinske settlement hromada
- Time zone: UTC+2 (EET)
  - Summer (DST): UTC+3 (EEST)
- Postal code: 77672

Osmoloda (Ukrainian: Осмолода) is a village in the Perehinske settlement hromada of the Kalush Raion of Ivano-Frankivsk Oblast in Ukraine.

== History ==
The official date of foundation is 1873.

In Osmoloda itself, there were sawmills that belonged to the metropolitanate. Ten kilometers from Osmoloda, in the Anheliv tract, a blast furnace built in 1810 by Antin Anhelovych, known as the Anheliv furnace, has been preserved.

On 19 July 2020, as a result of the administrative-territorial reform and liquidation of the Rozhniativ Raion, the village became part of the Kalush Raion.

== Religion ==
There are two wooden churches in the village:

- St. Andrew (18th century, moved from Ripne in 1936, Luzhky tract)
- St. John the Forerunner (19th century, Pidliute tract)

Near the village is the Pidliute tract, where the residence of Metropolitan Andrey Sheptytsky was located.

== Notable residents ==
- Vasyl Sydor (1910–1949), Ukrainian Insurgent Army colonel
