= Oleksander Tysovsky =

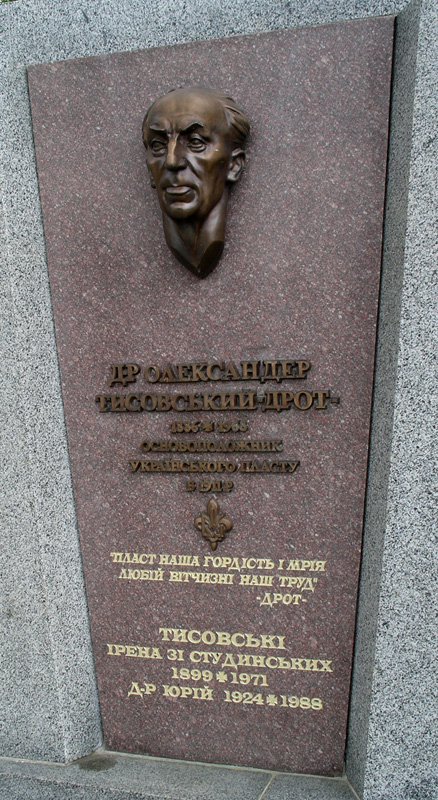
Tomb of Oleksander Tysovsky at Lychakivskiy Cemetery, Lviv.

Dr. Oleksander Tysovsky (Ukrainian: Олександер Тисовський alternately Oleksandr Tysowskyj) (August 9, 1886 – March 29, 1968), pseudonym: "Drot", founded the Ukrainian Scouting organization Plast in 1911 and adapted the universal Scout principles to the needs and interests of Ukrainian youth. In 1944 he emigrated to Vienna. He became involved in Plast in exile, as well, and took part in a camp celebrating the 45th anniversary of Plast in Plastova Sich in Canada in 1957. He died in Vienna 1968 and was buried in Vienna. He was reburied in the famous Lychakivskiy Cemetery in Lviv in 2002.
