= Stefan Bastyr =

Polish aviator and military pilot

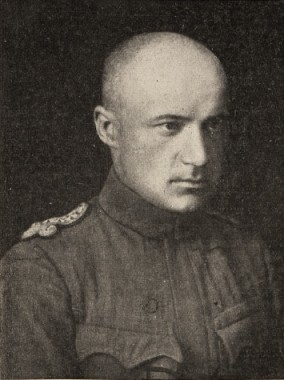

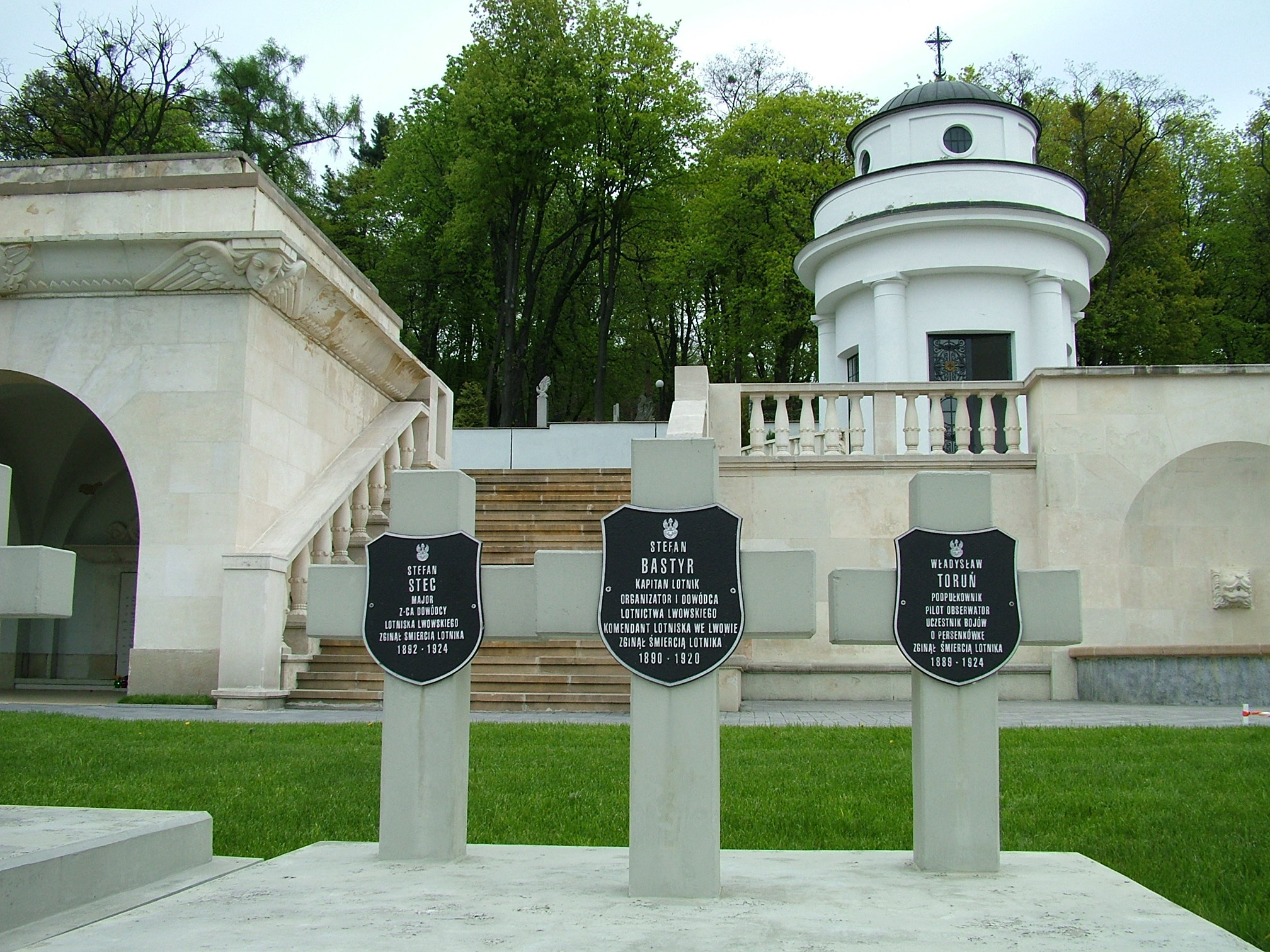
Tombs of Stefan Stec, Bastyr and Władysław Toruń in Lwów

Stefan Bastyr (17 August 1890 – 6 August 1920) was a Polish aviator and military pilot, one of the pioneers of the Polish aviation. He is credited with the first military flight in the history of the Polish Air Force on 5 November 1918, almost a week before Poland officially regained her independence, at the opening stages of the Polish-Ukrainian War.

Initially he was a military pilot in Austria-Hungary during World War I. From February 1916 he served as an observer in Flik 10 reconnaissance squadron on the eastern front, from December 1917 in Flik 12D on Austro-Italian front. In 1918 he himself trained as a pilot and was assigned to Flik 37P from June 1918. He undertook about 100 sorties during the war and scored at least 1 air victory on 4 June 1916.

In the Polish Air Force, he took part in the Battle of Lwów (1918). He performed the first military flight of Polish aircraft, on 5 November 1918 against Ukrainian troops at Persenkowka station, along with observer Janusz de Beaurain (he flew Oeffag C.II, or according to other publications, Hansa-Brandenburg C.I). He died in an aircrash of Fokker D.VII in Lviv (probably due to heart failure) during the Battle of Lwów (1920) and is buried at the Łyczaków cemetery in Lwów (modern Lviv).
