= Dmytro Andriievsky =

Ukrainian politician and publicist

Dmytro Andriievsky (Ukrainian: Дмитро Андрієвський; 27 September 1892 – 30 August 1976) was a Ukrainian political activist and publicist, known as one of the early ideologists of Ukrainian nationalism. During the Second World War he served as one of the leaders of OUN-M, and later was active as a member of the Ukrainian National Union.

== Biography ==
=== Early life ===
Dmytro Andriievsky was born in 1892 in the village of Budky near Zinkiv, Poltava Governorate, in the family of a priest. Andriievsky received education as an engineer. In November 1918 he took part in a secret meeting between members of the Ukrainian National Union and Sich Riflemen, which prepared ground for the Anti-Hetman Uprising. In 1919–1920 he worked as a member of Ukrainian People's Republic's diplomatic mission in Sweden, and in 1921 served as Ukrainian consul in Switzerland.

In 1922 Andriievsky moved to Belgium, where he graduated from the University of Ghent and worked as an architectural engineer for Sofina and several other companies in Belgium and France. He headed the local Ukrainian Committee and presided over the European Union of Ukrainian Organizations in Brussels. His articles were published in several Ukrainian émigré journals. Andriievsky also engaged in art criticism, publishing a review of woodcuts by Sofiya Nalepinska-Boychuk. One of his close associates was Ukrainian painter and Soviet secret agent Mykola Hlushchenko.

=== OUN membership ===
During his initial period in emigration, Andriievsky was a supporter of Symon Petlura and his government in exile, closely associating with Oleksander Shulhyn, Kostiantyn Matsiyevych and Maksym Slavinsky. However, after getting acquainted with Yevhen Konovalets, Volodymyr Martynets and Riko Yary, he adopted nationalist positions, and became a contributor to the magazine Rozbudova Natsii published by Ukrainian nationalist leadership in Prague.

In November 1927 Andriievsky was elected to become member of the Provid, the leading organ of Ukrainian nationalists. In 1929 he took part in the foundational congress of the by the Organization of Ukrainian Nationalists (OUN), and in the aftermath served as head of its foreign policy department. In 1934 he contributed to the establishment of contacts between OUN and the Empire of Japan through the Japanese ambassador in Warsaw, with the aim of persuading Tokyo to provide support for planned activities by OUN agents among the Ukrainian diaspora in Manchuria. During the same year, a personal file was established on Andriievsky's name by Soviet NKVD.

=== World War II and aftermath ===
A supporter of OUN's cooperation with Ukrainian political forces of other orientations, following the split of OUN in 1940 Andriievsky joined Andriy Melnyk's fraction of the organization, becoming one of its leading figures. Following the start of German-Soviet War, he visited Berlin, meeting with Melnyk. He later travelled to Ukraine, but was detained by German police in Lviv and returned to Berlin. Following arrest, on 21 January 1942 Andriievsky was imprisoned in Sachsenhausen concentration camp, where he spent the following two years. Following the arrest of Melnyk in 1944, he was imprisoned together with him in the German concentration camp at Brätz. According to other data, he was held as an inmate in Oranienburg concentration camp. Along with other detained Ukrainian nationalists, Andriievsky was accused of anti-German propaganda and attempts to establish an independent Ukrainian state.

Shortly before the end of the war, Andriievsky was released from imprisonment and moved to Weimar, and later to Bad Kissingen. Following the Capitulation of Germany, he returned to Belgium. In 1948 he became a member of the Ukrainian National Council, serving in the organization's executive and taking the post of state controller. He also became a member of the senate of OUN-M. During the same year, MGB declared him a dangerous criminal subject to immediate arrest. KGB agents continued to spy on him until at least 1963.

== Death and burial ==
Andriievsky's burial on the Lychakiv Cemetery

Andriievsky died in 1976 in Dornstadt, West Germany, and was buried in Munich. Following Ukraine's independence, his remains were reburied at the Lychakiv Cemetery in Lviv according to a decree by Ukrainian president Viktor Yushchenko.

== Publications ==
Andriievsky created numerous articles dedicated to the topics of Ukrainian nationalism and foreign policy. One of his prominent texts is Russian Colonialism and the Soviet Empire, published in 1958.

According to Andriievsky, development of the Ukrainian nation had its aim in creating a united monolithic community, whose joint interests would stand before personal ambition and class divisions of its participants. He considered overcoming what he called "slave psychology" and adoption of values such as self-respect, dignity and solidarity to be necessary parts of that process. In Andriievsky's view, the Ukrainian national idea could not be limited exclusively to ethnicity, and had to be formed on the basis of a distinct "historical mission" of Ukraine as a defender of European "West" from the Asian "East" embodied by aggressive Moscow.

Andriievsky saw the establishment of a separate Ukrainian state as a necessary prerequisite for the development of the Ukrainian nation, which could provide it with recognition from its neighbours and raise it to the status of a global power. He predicted the dissolution of the Soviet Union, seeing that state as unviable and unable to overcome internal divisions.

== Family ==
Andriievsky's father Yurii died in 1919 in the village of Popivka near Khorol, Poltava Oblast. Dmytro was the eldest of his five children: four sons and one daughter. His brother Borys Andriievsky was a surgeon, who served as a professor at Dnipropetrovsk and Lviv medical institutes; after the Second World War he moved to Germany, becoming one of the organizers of Ukrainian Red Cross, and later settled in the United States. Borys reportedly cooperated with OUN-B and in 1945 performed a wound operation on one of its leaders Yaroslav Stetsko in Munich. Two other brothers, Feodosii and Ivan, were arrested by the NKVD, with the latter being sentenced to execution by firing squad.
