= Iryna Vilde =

Ukrainian writer (1907–1982)

- Ірина Вільде
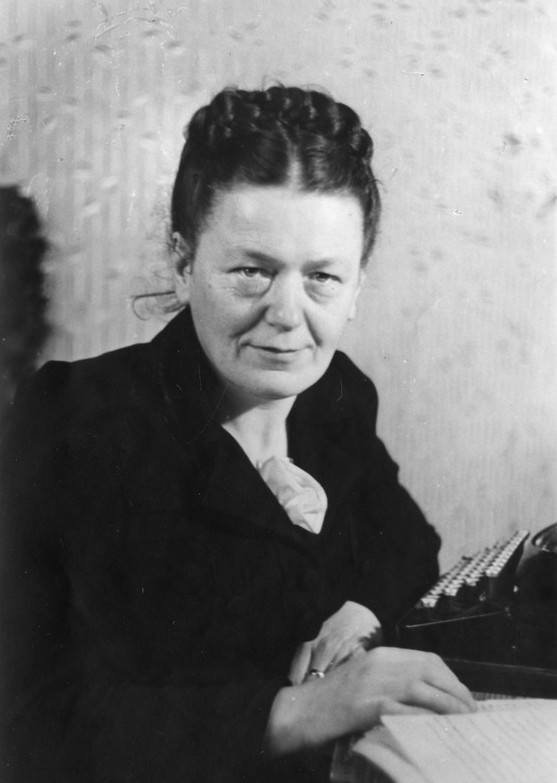
- Born: Daryna Makohon; 5 May 1907; Chernivtsi, Austria-Hungary
- Died: 30 October 1982 (aged 75); Lviv, Ukrainian SSR, USSR
- Education: University of John II Casimir Vasa
- Occupation: Writer
- Spouse: Yevhen Polotniuk
- Awards: Shevchenko National Prize; Ivan Franko Prize

Daryna Polotniuk (née Makohon; Ukrainian: Дарина Полотнюк (Макогон); 5 May 1907 – 30 October 1982), better known by her pen name Iryna Vilde (Ukrainian: Ірина Вільде), was a Ukrainian and Soviet writer and correspondent. Vilde's works are now considered classics of Ukrainian literature.

== Childhood and education ==
Vilde was born on 5 May 1907 in Chernivtsi, Austria-Hungary. Her father was Dmytro Makohon, a schoolteacher and writer, her mother, Adolphina Janiszewska, was a teacher. Vilde was married to Yevhen Polotniuk who in 1943 was executed by the Gestapo. With Polotniuk she had two children. She died after a long illness on 30 October 1982 and was buried at the Lychakiv Cemetery in Lviv.

In 1927, she graduated in Stanislav private school. Expelled from school in 1930 as part of anti-Ukrainian Pacification operation, she nonetheless graduated in 1932 from "University of John II Casimir in Lwow" (today University of Lviv). Soon after graduation, due to material deprivation, she was forced to get a job with the magazine Zhinocha dolia (Women's fate) in Kolomyia, where she worked until 1939.

== Writing ==
From 1930 to 1939, she published a number of short stories and novels about the life of the Western Ukrainian intelligentsia, the petty bourgeoisie, and students. The first short story of the young writer Povist zyttia (Life Story) appeared in print in 1930. In 1935, she published the novel Metelyky na shpyl’kakh (Pinned Butterflies) under the pseudonym “Iryna Vilde”.

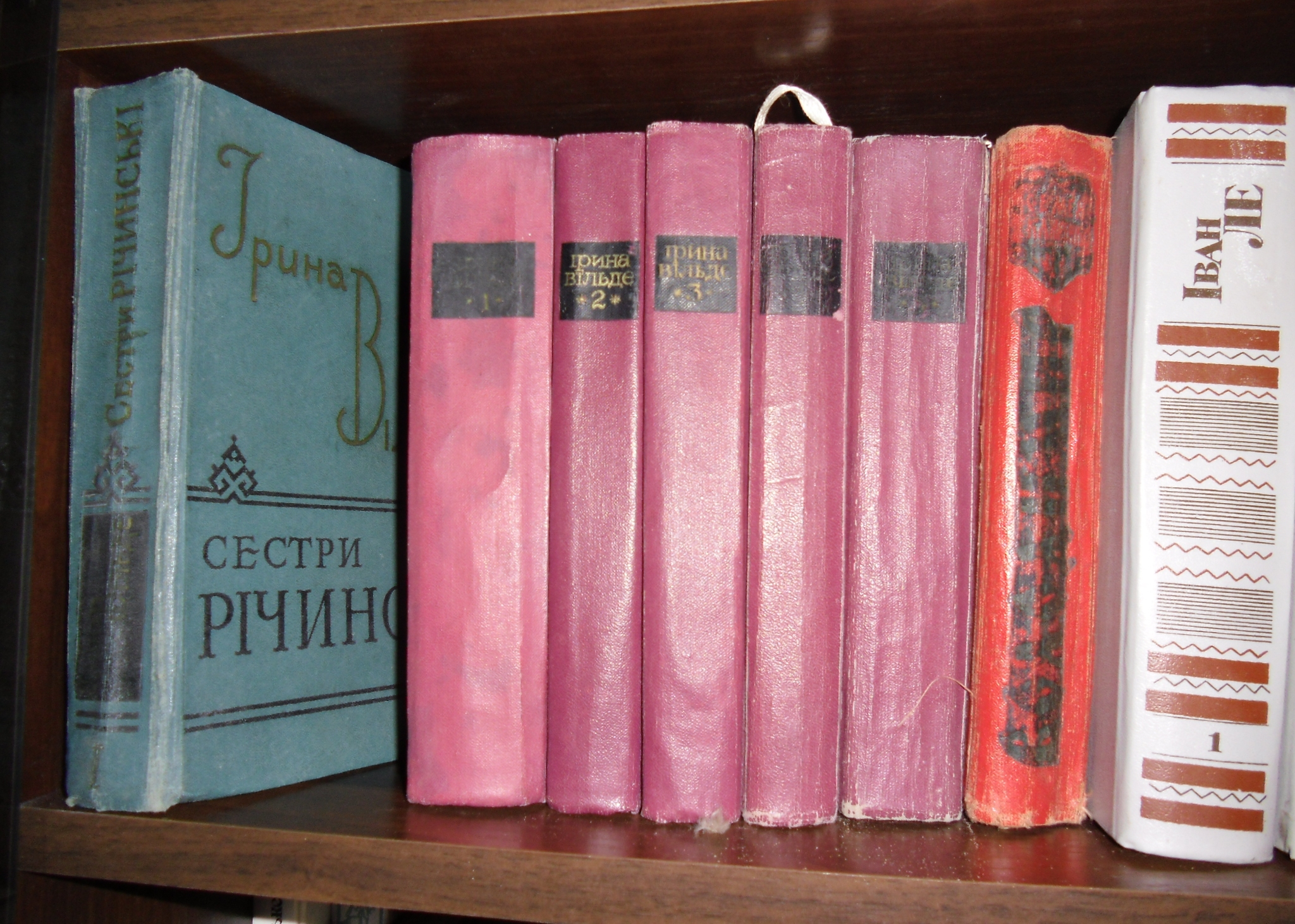
The collection of works by Iryne Vilde.

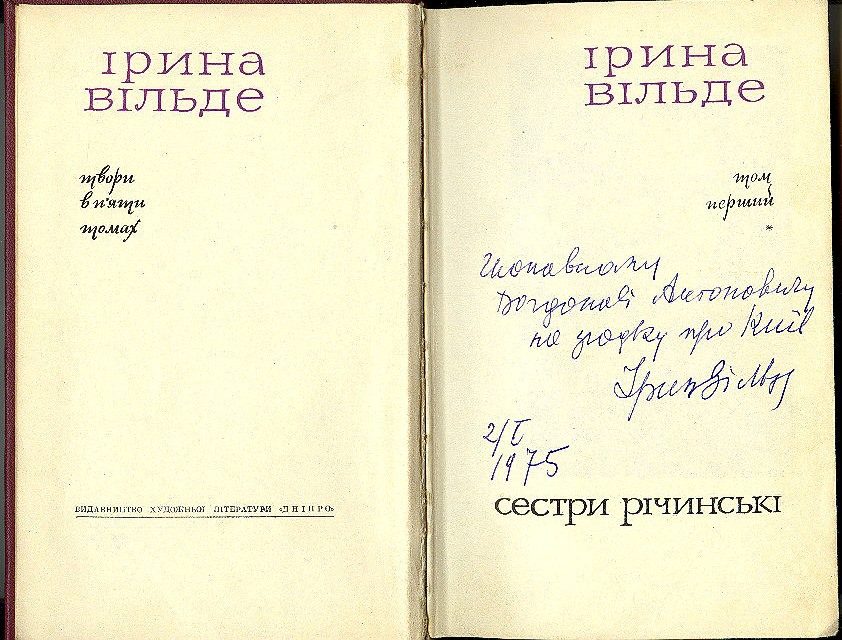
Signature of Iryna Vilde.

During the war period, and after the unification of Western Ukraine with Ukrainian SSR, she continued to describe the familiar themes of family in bourgeois society. Her works contain a huge number of characters — protagonists from all public spheres of Galicia — the clergy, employees, workers, peasantry, petty bourgeoisie, as well as information on the activities of various parties and public organizations, the Polish administration policy, the economy, education and culture. Among them are the anthology of short stories Khymerne sertse (The Whimsical Heart, 1936), the novelettes Metelyky na shpyl’kakh (Pinned Butterflies, 1936), the story Povnolitni dity (Grown-up Children, 1939), B’ie vos'ma (The Clock Strikes Eight, 1936).

Her postwar works include: Nashi bat'ky roziishlysia (Our Parents Have Separated, 1946), Iii portret (Her Portrait 1948), Stezhynamy zhyttia (Along the Paths of Life, 1949), Ti z Kowalskoi (Those of Kowalska, 1947), Iabluni zatsvily vdruhe (The Apple Trees Have Blossomed Again, 1949), Povisti ta opovidannia (Tales and Stories" 1949), Zhyttia til’ky pochynaiet’sia (Life Is Just Beginning, 1961), Troiandy i ternia (Roses and Thorns, 1961), the novel Sestry Richynski (The Richynsky Sisters, 2 vols, 1958, 1964) and many others. Richynski Sisters is the most celebrated work of the writer.

She was a member of the Writers' Union.

== Awards and honours ==
Vilde has been laureate of literary awards named after Ivan Franko and Taras Shevchenko. In 1965, she was awarded the Order of Badge of Honor.

== Death and legacy ==
Vilde died on 30 October 1982. She was put into the UNESCO list of known people of the 20th century.
