= Oleksander Ohonovsky =

Ukrainian lawyer, legal scholar, and civic leader

Oleksander Ohonovsky (Ukrainian: Огоновський Олександр Михайлович; March 17, 1848 – February 10, 1891) was a lawyer, legal scholar, and civic leader in Austria-Hungary.

Oleksander Ohonovsky was born in Bukachivtsi, Rohatyn county, Kingdom of Galicia and Lodomeria. After graduating from Lviv University (LL D, 1871), he practiced law and, from 1878, taught law at Lviv University. He was the first law professor to lecture in Ukrainian at the university, and he made an important contribution to the development of Ukrainian legal terminology, even though he did not manage to publish the Ukrainian legal dictionary he compiled. In 1886, he was appointed dean of the law faculty. Ohonovsky was a specialist in Austrian civil law and wrote the monographs Die Geschäftsführung ohne Auftrag nach dem österreichischen Rechte (1877) and Österreichisches Ehengüterrecht (1880). He was active in Ukrainian civic organizations and helped to found a number of societies, such as Druzhnyi Lykhvar, Prosvita societies, the Shevchenko Scientific Society, and the Ridna Shkola society. He was editor of the political journal Pravda (1872–1876), and cofounder and first president of the People's Council.
