= Władysław Toruń =

Polish aviator (1889–1924)

Lieutenant colonel Władysław Toruń
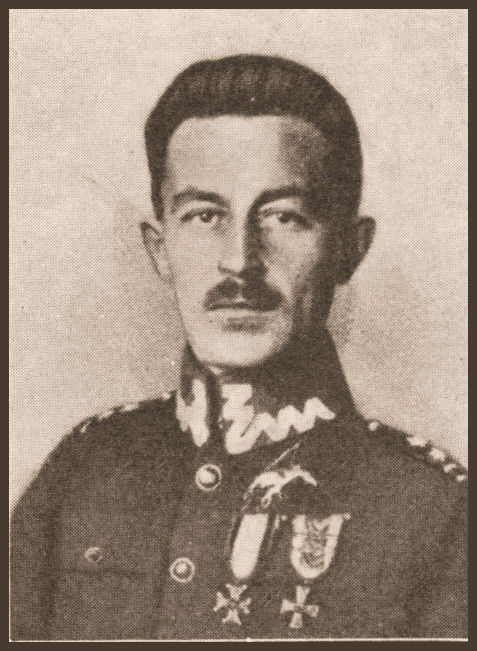
- Born: July 7, 1889; Nowy Sącz
- Died: August 9, 1924 (aged 35)
- Cause of death: Plane crash
- Buried: Lwów, Poland
- Allegiance: Poland
- Branch: Polish Air Force
- Rank: Lieutenant colonel
- Battles: World War I: fought in the Battle of Lwów, 1918, and the Battle of Lwów, 1920

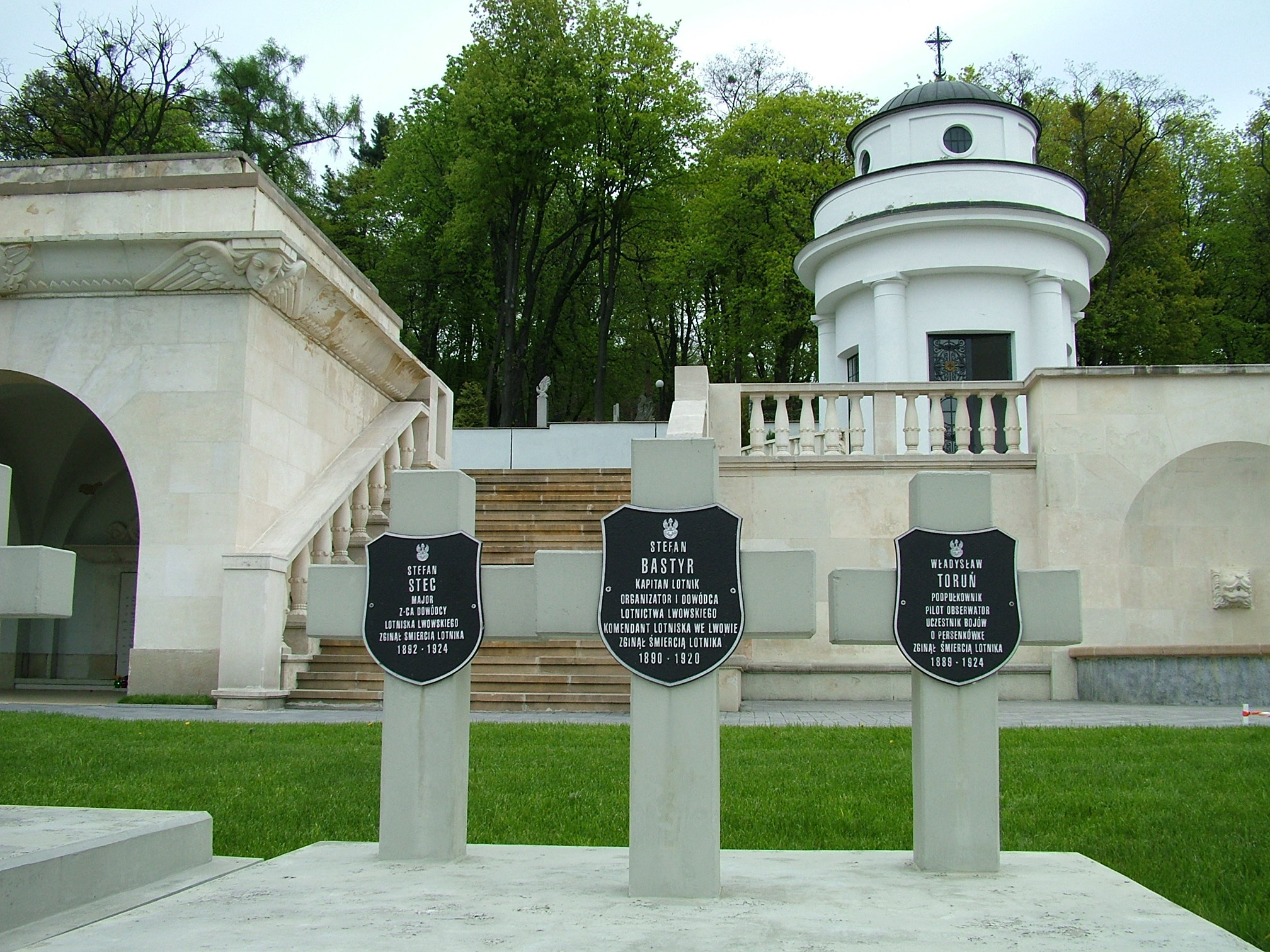
Tombs of Stefan Stec, Stefan Bastyr and Władysław Toruń in Lwów

Lt. Col. Władysław Toruń (July 7, 1889, Nowy Sącz — August 9, 1924) was a Polish aviator and military pilot, and one of the pioneers of Polish aviation.

== Military career ==
Initially a military pilot in Austria-Hungary during the Great War, he was among the first pilots to join the Polish Air Force. He took part in the Battle of Lwów (1918) and the Battle of Lwów (1920). As a professional engineer, in 1922-1923 he was chief of Central Aircraft Workshops (Centralne Warsztaty Lotnicze - CWL) in Warsaw. He died in an air crash on August 9, 1924.
