= Sydir Tverdokhlib =

Ukrainian journalist and poet

Sydir Antonovych Tverdokhlib
- Си́дір Анто́нович Твердохлі́б
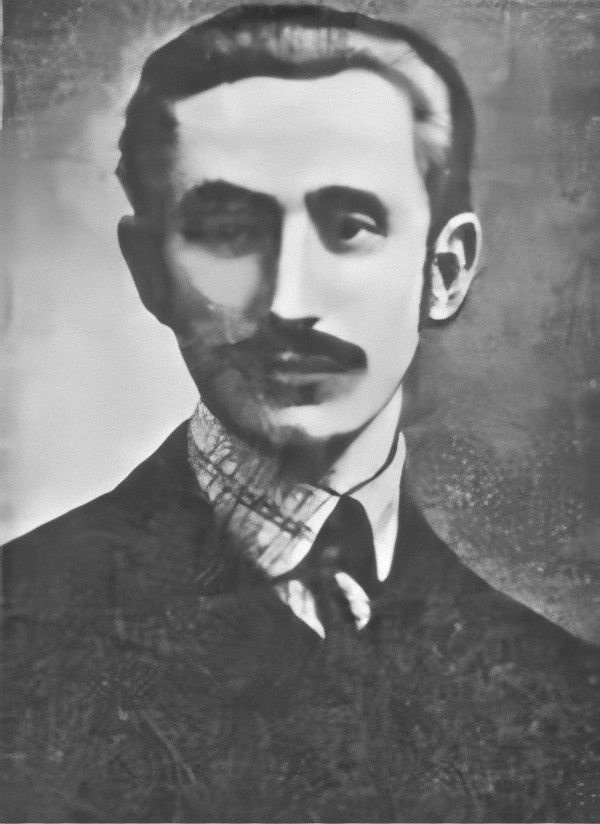
- Born: May 9, 1886; Berezhany
- Died: October 15, 1922 (aged 36)
- Citizenship: Austrian, Polish
- Occupations: poet, translator, politician

Sydir Tverdokhlib (Ukrainian: Сидір Антонович Твердохліб; 9 May 1886, Berezhany - 15 October 1922, Kamionka Strumiłowa) was a Ukrainian poet, translator and politician.

He studied at the University of Lviv and the University of Vienna, later he worked as a teacher in Lviv. He belonged to the modernist artistic movement of Moloda muza [ukr], and Dmytro Dontsov. Tverdokhlib's first poems appeared in the magazines "Svit" (1906), "Bukovyna", "Rozvaha" and others.

He published a separate collection of poems V svichadi plesa (1908). He also wrote the novels Neskinchenyy arkhytvir and others. Tverdokhlib's poetry was filled with melancholy and longing for beauty. He also translated several poems from and into Ukrainian. For example: into German - Haidamaky by Taras Shevchenko, into Polish - poems by Shevchenko, Oleksandr Oles, short stories by Mykhailo Yatskiv [ukr] and others. Into Ukrainian - Ojciec zadżumionych, W Szwajcarii by Juliusz Słowacki and others.

Tverdokhlib also published in Polish periodicals.

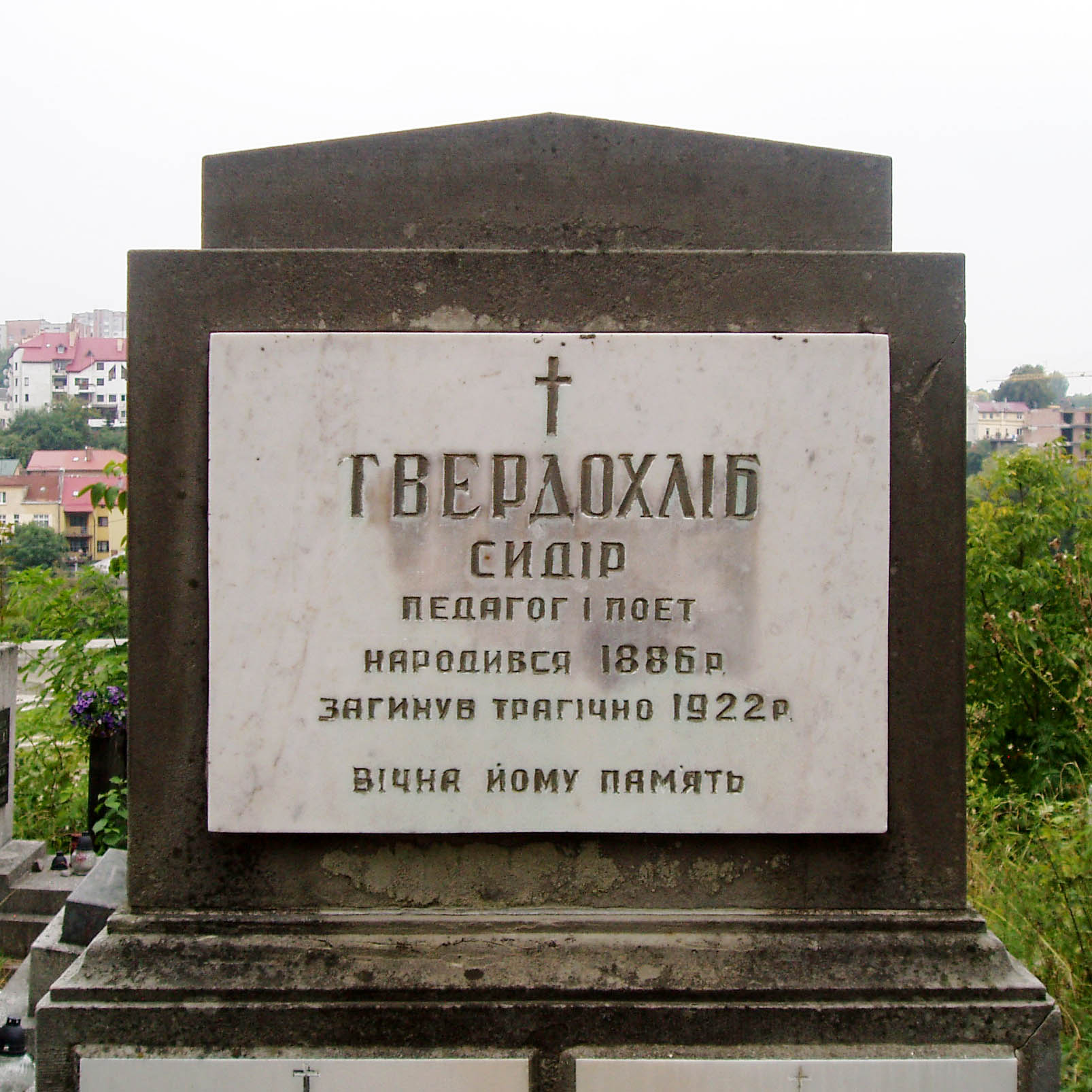
A monument on the grave of Sidor Tverdokhlib at the Lychakiv cemetery.

In 1920, he headed the Ukrainian Agrarian Party [ukr], which recognized the Polish authority over Eastern Galicia and declared its participation in the elections to the Sejm scheduled for November 1922, in the event of a boycott of the elections announced by all major Ukrainian political parties in Galicia. Tverdokhlib was a candidate for a member of the Sejm of the Republic of Poland. Breaking the boycott of the elections led to a death sentence for him by the Ukrainian Military Organization. Tverdokhlib was shot during the election campaign, on October 15, 1922, in Kamionka Strumiłowa. As a result of the elections, the party won five parliamentary seats.

He was buried at the Lychakiv Cemetery in Lviv (field 76). His friend, the sculptor Zygmunt Kurczyński [pol], intended to make a monumental tombstone with symbolic statues for him, but the poet's widow gave up on this idea and ordered an ordinary tombstone.

== Bibliography ==
- Achilli, Alessandro (2021). "Four Decades of Modernist Revolution: Creating a New Subjectivity in Ukrainian Poetry, 1900–1940". Harvard Ukrainian Studies. 38 (1–2): 107–134. JSTOR 48694963.
- Magocsi, Paul Robert (2010). A History of Ukraine. The Land and Its Peoples (2nd ed.). Toronto.

Media related to Sydir Tverdokhlib at Wikimedia Commons
