= Stefan Stec (Polish aviator) =

Polish aviator and military pilot

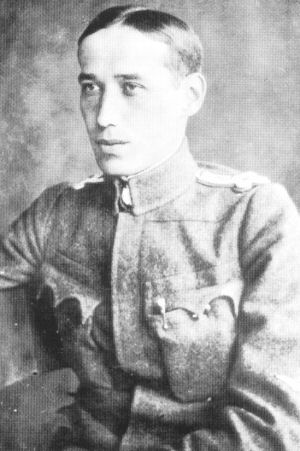

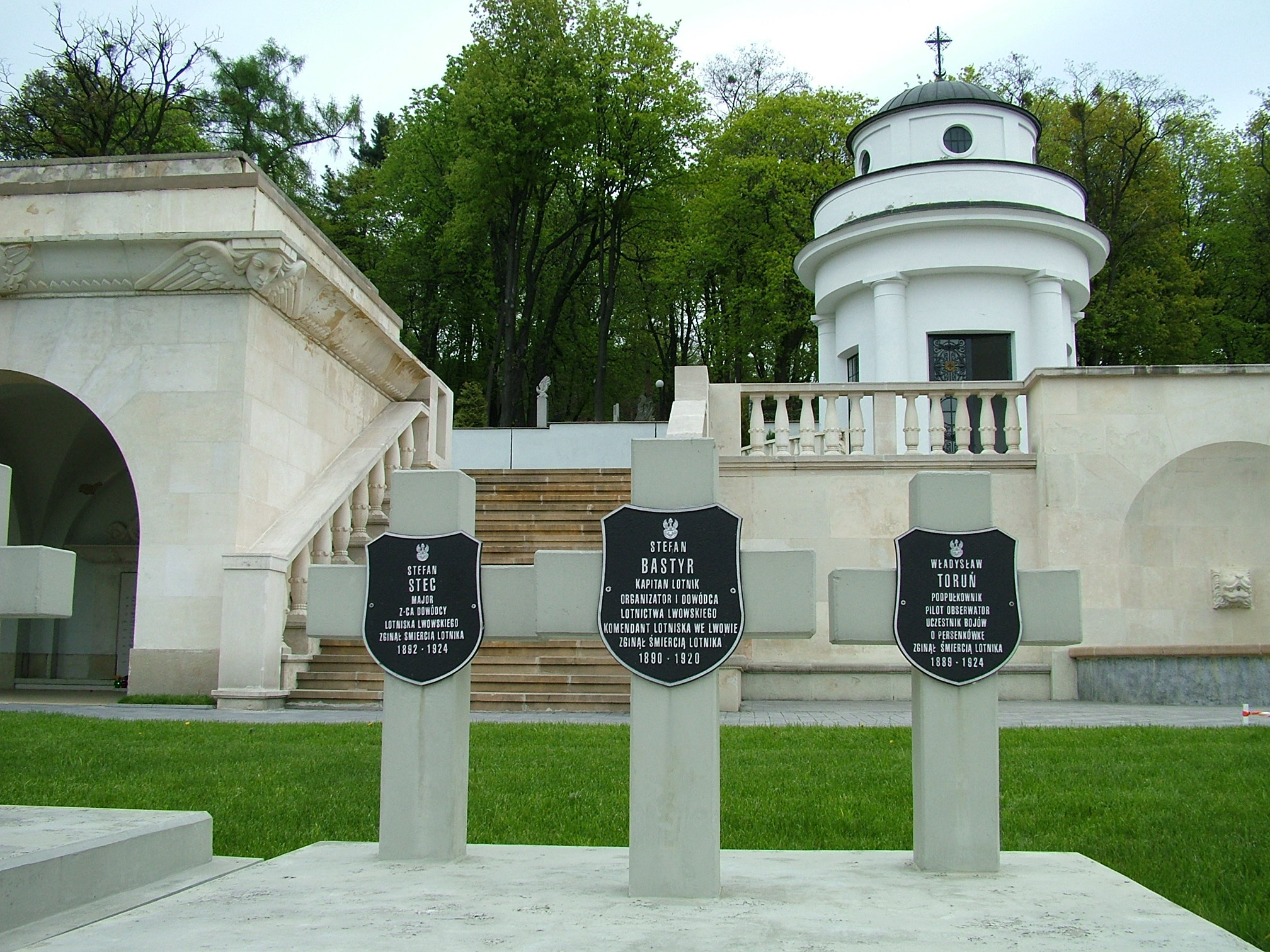
Tombs of Stec, Stefan Bastyr and Władysław Toruń in Lwów

Stefan Stanisław Stec (November 21, 1893 - May 11, 1921) was a Polish aviator and military pilot, one of the pioneers of Polish aviation. He is also credited as the originator of the Polish Air Force checkerboard.

From 1916 he initially served as an observer in the Flik 3 reconnaissance squadron on the eastern front. In February 1918 he trained as a pilot and from May he was assigned to the Flik 3J fighter squadron, flying the Oeffag D.III on the Austro-Italian front. Between June 17 and July 4 he commanded Flik 9J. He participated in shooting down 3 aircraft (plus 4 probable kills) and ended the war as an Oberleutnant.

He was among the first pilots to join the Polish Air Force. In November 1918 hostilities broke out between Poland and the Western Ukrainian Republic over the possession of East Galicia and Lwów. In March/April 1919 two Fokker E.Vs were presented by the province of Wielkopolska to the defenders of Lwów. These aircraft were used by the 7th Eskadra Lotnicza, flown by Cpt. Stefan Bastyr and Stec, in operations against Ukrainian forces. He carried out the first bombing sortie on November 7. Later he flew the Fokker D.VII fighter.

In May 1919 the 7th Eskadra had three Fokker E.Vs, three Brandenburgs and a LVG C.VI. By June the flight had almost ceased to exist because of a lack of equipment. With war with the Soviets impending, Stec collected all Fokker E.Vs together in the 7th Eskadra, transforming it into a fighter unit. In August the eskadra received 12 Albatros (Oef) D IIIs purchased from Austria.

In 1919, flying E.V 185/18, he shot down a Ukrainian fighter Nieuport 11 and a balloon, becoming a fighter ace. From April to October 1919 he was commander of the 7th Escadrille (later to become the Kościuszko Squadron).

Later he went to France to study in Ecole Supérieure d'Aéronautique. After returning to Poland, he was involved in establishing Polish aircraft production. He died in an air crash in 1921.

His personal emblem from the time of Austrian service, a red and white checkerboard, was adopted on December 1, 1918 as the Polish Air Force national insignia.

First form of the checkerboard, in 1918-1921

The checkerboard with border, used in 1921-1993

Polish Air Force checkerboard - from 1993 to present
