= Zyzak =

Zyzak is a Polish surname. Notable people with the surname include:

- Magdalena Zyzak (born 1983), Polish filmmaker and novelist
- Paweł Zyzak (born 1984), Polish historian
