= Poland–United States relations =

- Poland: United States

Diplomatic mission
- Polish Embassy, Washington, D.C.: United States Embassy, Warsaw

Envoy
- Chargé d’affaires a.i. Bogdan Klich: Ambassador Tom Rose

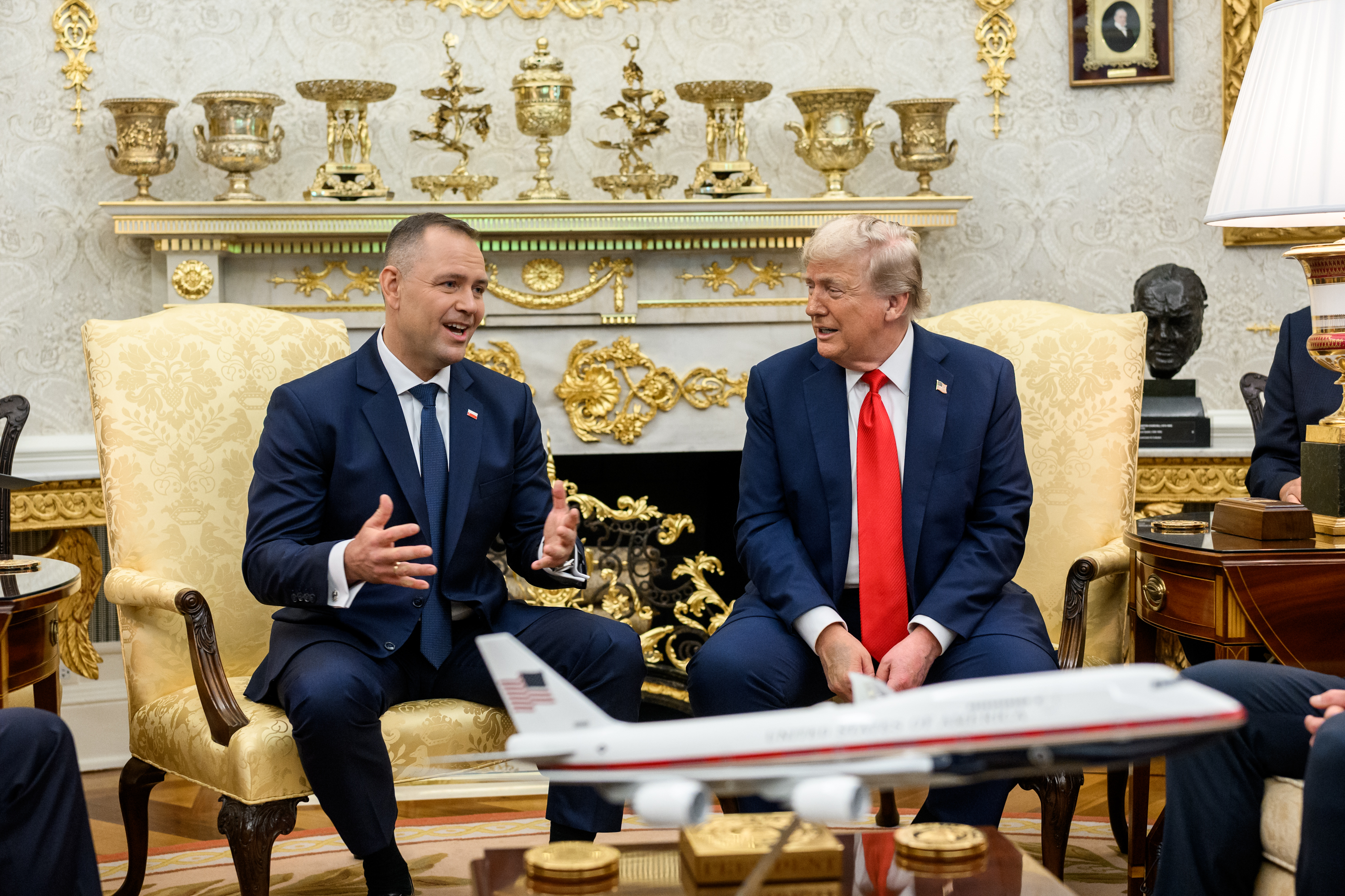
Polish President Karol Nawrocki with U.S. President Donald Trump in the Oval Office of the White House on 3 September 2025

Official relations between Poland and the United States on a diplomatic level were initiated in 1919 after Poland had established itself as a republic after 123 years of being under foreign rule from the Partitions of Poland. However, ties with the United States date back to the 17th century, when the Polish–Lithuanian Commonwealth was one of Europe's largest powers, and many Poles immigrated to the Thirteen Colonies. During the American Revolutionary War, the Polish military commanders Tadeusz Kościuszko and Casimir Pułaski contributed greatly to the Patriot cause, with Kościuszko becoming a national hero in America.

Since 1989, Polish–American relations have been strong and Poland is one of the chief European allies of the United States, being part of both NATO and the European Union. There is a strong cultural appreciation between the two nations (Polonophilia). According to the US Department of State, Poland remains a "stalwart ally" and "one of strongest Continental partners in fostering security and prosperity, throughout Europe and the world." Poland was also one of four participating countries in the American-led Iraq War coalition in 2003.

== Before 20th century ==
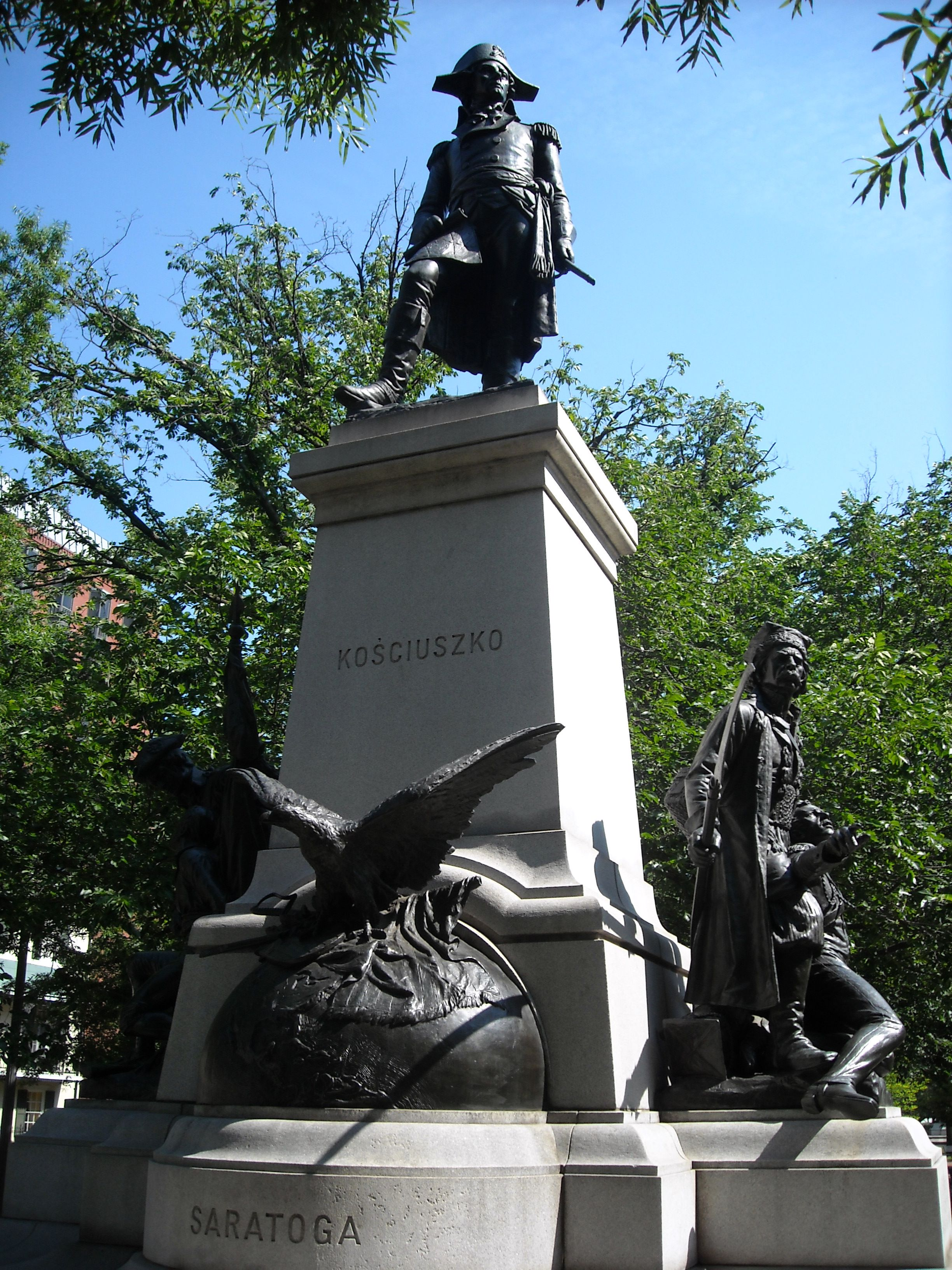
Kosciuszko statue in Lafayette Park, Washington, DC

The partitions of Poland erased Poland from the map in 1795 and long prevented the establishment of official diplomatic relations between Poland and the new United States. However, Poland, which enacted the world's second-oldest constitution in 1791, always considered the United States a positive influence. Even in the 18th century, important Polish figures such as Tadeusz Kościuszko and Casimir Pulaski became closely involved with shaping US history. Haym Salomon, a Polish Jew, was the prime financier of the American side during the American Revolutionary War against Great Britain. Many Poles also emigrated to the United States in the 19th century and formed a large Polish American community in urban centres such as Chicago.

=== American response to November Uprising ===
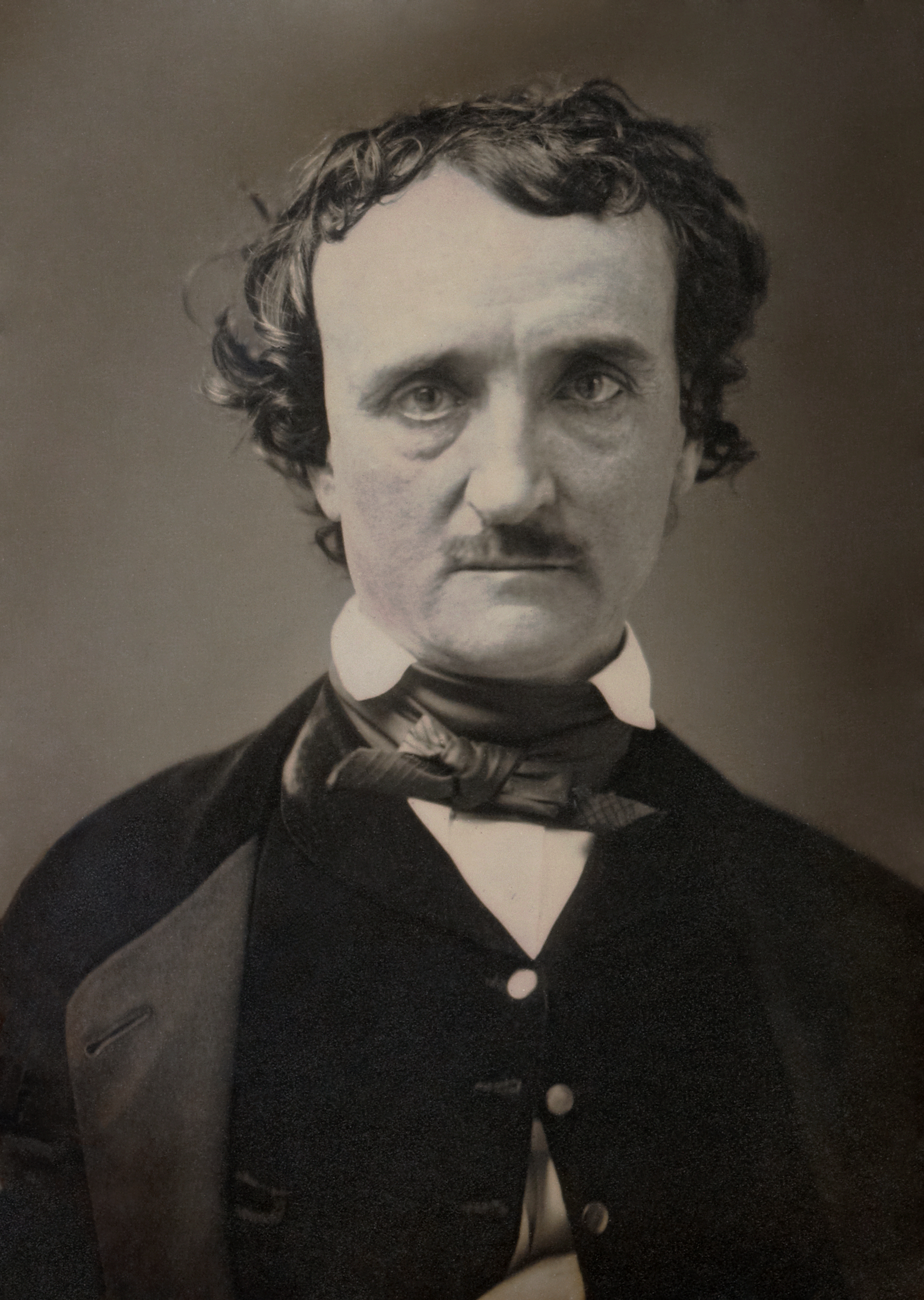
The American writer Edgar Allan Poe wished to join a possible Polish Army to fight off the partitioning powers.

Poland's November Uprising in 1831 and the fight for regaining independence from the neighbouring empires were extensively documented and editorialized in American newspapers. As the historian Jerzy Jan Lerski described, "one could reproduce in detail virtually the whole story of the November Uprising from the 1831 files of American dailies published at that time, regardless of the fact that they were usually four-sheet affairs with little space left for foreign news." There were very few Poles in the United States at the time, but views of Poland were shaped positively by its support for the American Revolution. Several young men offered their military services to fight for Poland, the most well-known of which was Edgar Allan Poe, who wrote a letter to his commanding officer March 10, 1831 to join the Polish Army if it was created in France.

Support for Poland was highest in the South, as Casimir Pulaski's death in Savannah, Georgia, was well-remembered and memorialized. An American surgeon, Dr. Paul Fitzsimmons, from the Georgia, actually joined the Polish Army in 1831. He was then in France and, inspired by "how gallant Pulaski had fallen at the siege of Savannah during the Revolutionary struggle of 1776," traveled to Warsaw as a field surgeon for the Polish infantry.

The United States never initiated the creation of a military force for supporting Poland. Financial support and gifts were sent from the United States to the American-Polish Committee in France, which intended to purchase supplies and transport aid to Poland. The American writer James Fenimore Cooper wrote an appeal for the organization at the height of his popularity and motivated a nationwide collection for Poland in American cities. The Frenchman General Lafayette was an outspoken voice in France and urged for a French intervention to aid Poland in its independence from Russia. The French government sought to make peace with the Russian Empire and generally stayed out of the conflict.

Following the collapse of the insurrection, American newspapers continued to publish news from British and French sources documenting oppression of Poles by the Russian and German Empires. Newspaper editors made mention of the Russians as "brutal" and "evil," and the Poles were "gallant" and "heroic" in their efforts. The American public was apprised of the ongoing suppression of the Polish Catholic Church and the conscription of Poles into the Imperial Russian Army, which hurt Russian-American relations. An American writer in Boston, Robin Carver, wrote a children's book in 1831, Stories of Poland, which said that for Polish children, "Their houses are not peaceful and happy homes, but are open to the spies and soldiers of a cruel and revengeful government.... There is no confidence, no repose, no hope for them, and will not be, till, by some more fortunate struggle, they shall drive the Russians from their borders, and become an independent people." Poetic tributes to Poland were written in America, and literature denouncing the Russian treatment towards Poland continued after the Uprising. Russian Emperor Nicholas I and his emissaries asked the US Secretary of State for a formal rebuke of American newspapers reporting the mistreatment of Poles. US Secretary of State Edward Livingston chose to wait two months before responding to Russia's demands, but the US ambassador to Russia, James Buchanan, made promises to the Russians that the American press would circulate evidence that Russian cruelty had been "much overplayed." The historian Jerzy Jan Lerski was critical of Buchanan's pro-Russian stance on the Polish issue and said that he made statements on Poland without visiting the country or "listening to Polish testimony."

=== Lincoln and Civil War ===
Poland's independence lost favour among American intellectuals during the American Civil War. Historians have argued that US President Abraham Lincoln was sympathetic to the Poles but chose not to intervene in Europe's affairs out of fear that European powers would support the Confederate States. The historian Tom Delahaye pointed to 1863 as a critical breakdown in relations between the "Crimean Coalition" (Britain, France, and Austria) and Russia, with Poland's independence a key reason for conflict. Russian sympathies were solidly in favor of the North, and Lincoln expressed a non-interventionist policy towards Russia's "Polish problem." By doing so, Lincoln alienated himself from the British and the French politics and came closer to Russia, which contributed to a balance of power in favor of the tsar.

== Second Polish Republic ==
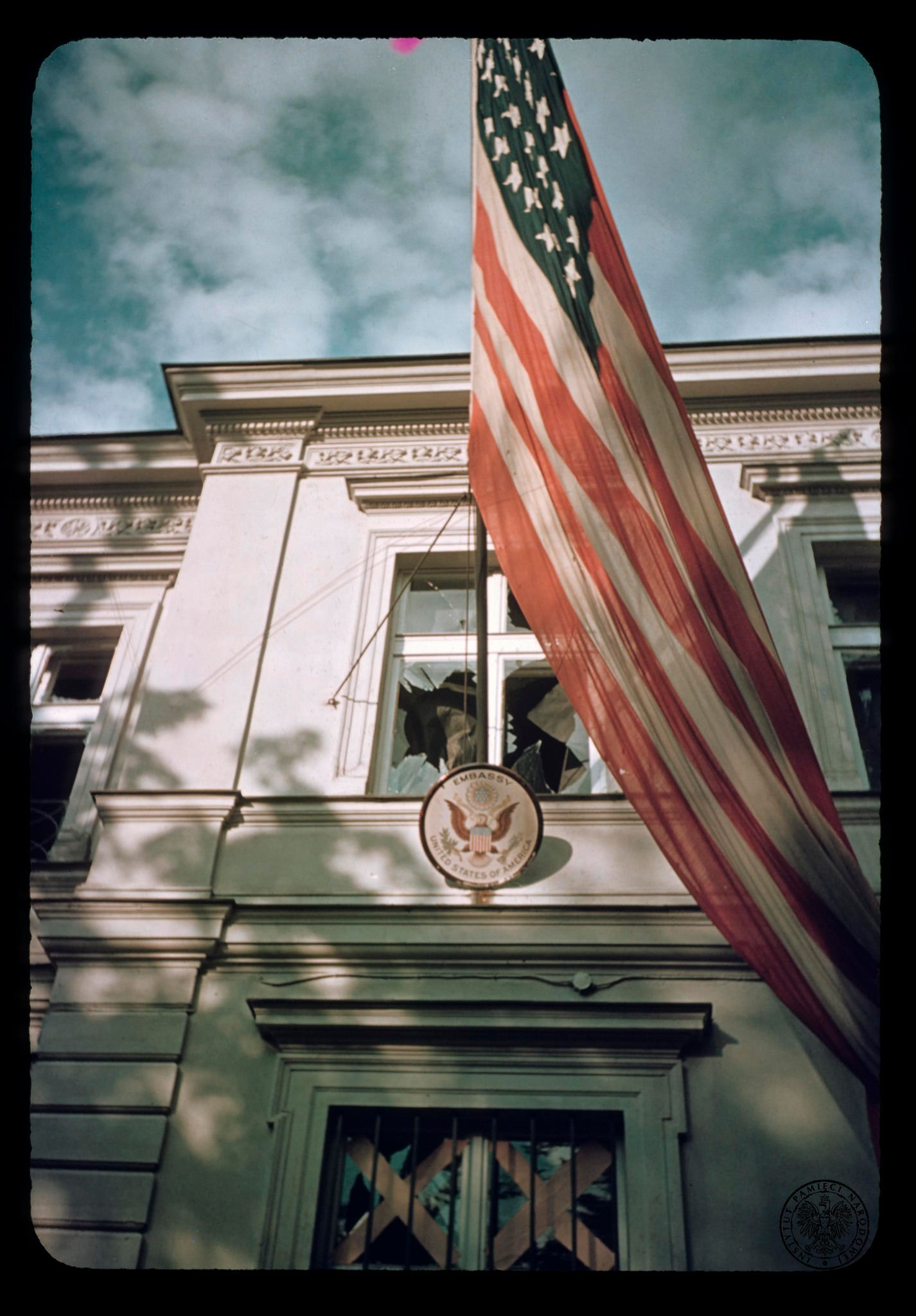
The US embassy in Warsaw with shattered windows after the German bombing during the invasion of Poland in September 1939. Original colour photo by Julien Bryan.

On 8 January 1918, US President Woodrow Wilson issued his war aims, the Fourteen Points. Point 13 called for independent Poland with access to the sea: "An independent Polish state should be erected which should include the territories inhabited by indisputably Polish populations, which should be assured a free and secure access to the sea, and whose political and economic independence and territorial integrity should be guaranteed by international covenant." On January 22, 1919, US Secretary of State Robert Lansing notified Polish Prime Minister and Secretary for Foreign Affairs, Ignacy Jan Paderewski that the US had recognized the Provisional Polish Government.

At the Paris peace conference between January–June 1919, point 13 with its reference to Poland having "free and secure access to the sea" was the source of much dispute. At the peace conference, Wilson stated what he meant by point 13 was the German city of Danzig (modern Gdańsk, Poland) should go to Poland. Danzig was a deep water port located where the Vistula river flows into the Baltic Sea, making the city the principle point where both imports and exports went into and out of Poland. The Polish delegation at the Paris peace conference led by Roman Dmowski argued that allowing Danzig to remain with Germany would give the Reich economic control of Poland and that for Poland to be truly independent required that Danzig go to Poland. Alongside Wilson, the French Premier Georges Clemenceau supported the Polish claim to Danzig, but the British prime minister David Lloyd George was opposed, arguing that because the population of Danzig was about 90% German that ceding the city to Poland would violate the right to national self-determination. In a compromise that pleased no-one, under the terms of the Treaty of Versailles, Danzig was severed from Germany to become the Free City of Danzig, a city-state in which Poland had certain special rights. Wilson argued that he maintained his promise made in point 13 to give Poland "free and secure access to the sea" while respected the wishes of the German population of Danzig not to be forced into Poland by accepting the compromise of the Free City of Danzig.

The United States established diplomatic relations with the newly-formed Polish Republic in April 1919 but the relations between the two countries were distant though positive because of United States non-interventionism and Poland being seen as unimportant for US interests.

Eventually, both countries were part of the Allies during World War II, but there was relatively little need for detailed coordination between the US and the Polish government-in-exile, which was based in London. American prisoners of war were held alike Polish prisoners of war in several German prisoner-of-war camps in modern Poland, including Stalag II-B, Stalag II-D, Stalag III-C, Stalag VIII-A, Stalag XXI-C, Stalag 357, Stalag Luft III, Stalag Luft IV, Stalag Luft 7, Oflag XXI-B. Americans, alongside Poles and other nationals, were also among the prisoners of the particularly notorious Nazi German prison camp in Żabikowo.

== Communist Poland ==
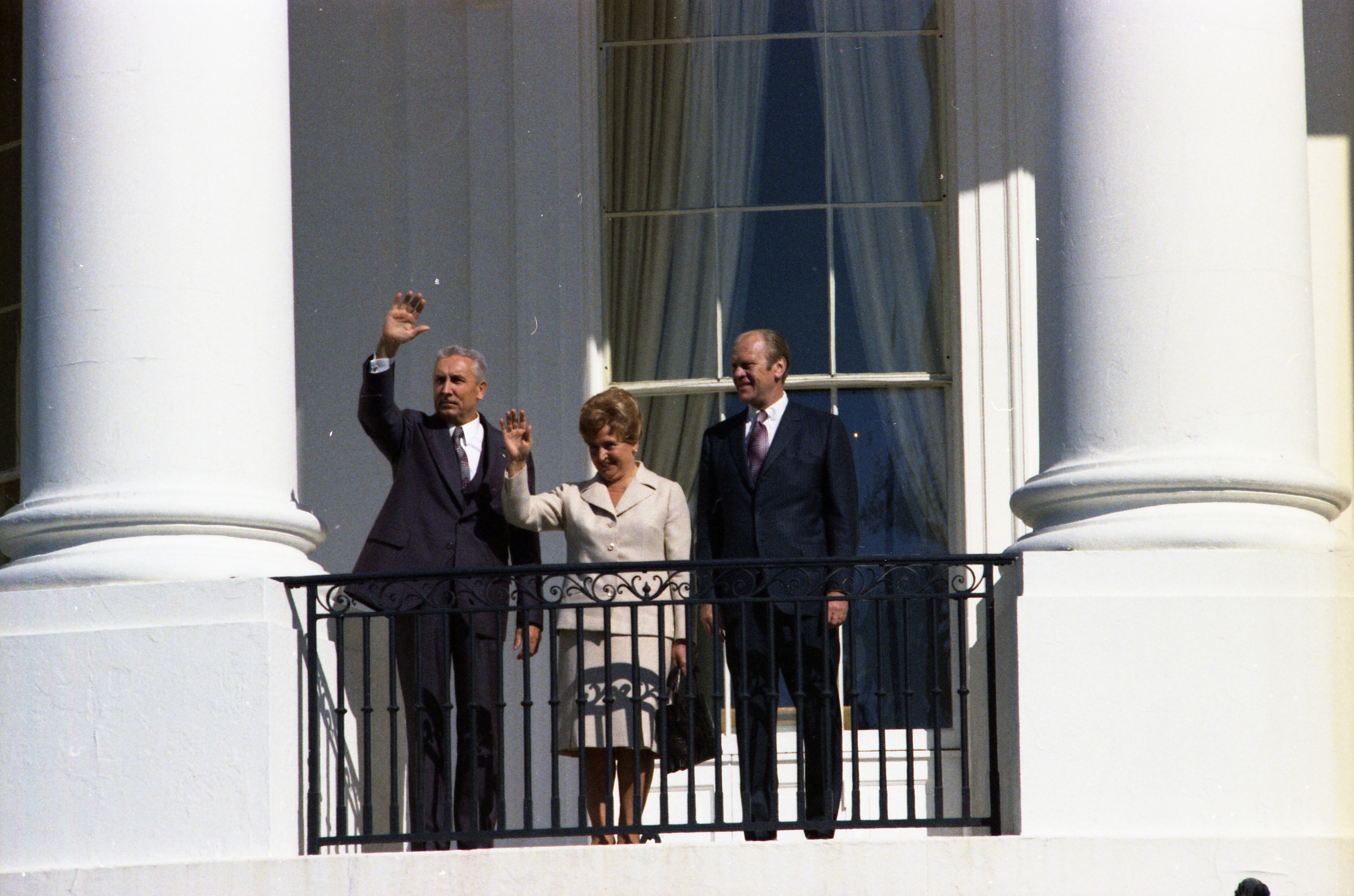
Edward Gierek, First Secretary and leader of the communist Polish People's Republic, waving from the balcony of the White House in Washington, DC, in 1974. To the right is President Gerald Ford.

On July 5, 1945, the US government recognized the communist government installed in Warsaw, thus abandoning the Polish government-in-exile. After 1950, Poland, which became the Polish People's Republic since 1952, became a member of the Eastern Bloc and opposed America during the Cold War. The first US ambassador to postwar Poland, Arthur Bliss Lane, wrote a book I Saw Poland Betrayed about how the Western Allies had abandoned their former ally, Poland, to Soviet influence. However, the Polish people and government maintained very close and warm ties with the Western Bloc and the United States.

In September 1946, the American secretary of state James F. Byrnes gave a speech in Stuttgart where in an attempt to appeal to German opinion stated that the Oder–Neisse line was only temporary and that some of the areas recently annexed to Poland might be returned to Germany at a late date. Through Byrnes did not in fact call for Germany to regain its lost lands east of the Oder-Neisse line, the implication of the Stuttgart speech that it might caused much anger in Poland. Byrnes's speech was described as having a "devastating" impact on those Poles who looked towards the United States as an ally.

After Gomułka's arrival to power in 1956, relations with the United States improved considerably. In 1957, the Eisenhower administration as part of a gambit to force the European members of NATO to spend more on defense (a chronic American complaint) suggested in public that the United States would provide West Germany with nuclear weapons if the other NATO did not increase their defense spending. In Warsaw, the American suggestion caused much fear as it was believed that a nuclear-armed West Germany would inevitably use its nuclear weapons to take back the lands east of the Oder-Neisse line. To end this possibility, the Polish Foreign Minister Adam Rapacki devised the Rapacki plan under which Poland, Czechoslovakia, East Germany and West Germany would all be a nuclear weapons free zone alongside a ban on missiles capable of firing nuclear weapons. From the Polish viewpoint, the Rapacki plan had the additional benefit of keeping Soviet nuclear weapons and missiles out of Poland, which would thus end the possibility of American nuclear strikes to destroy them, which in turn would limit the amount of nuclear fall-out on Poland in the event of World War Three. In a speech at the United Nations General Assembly in New York on 2 October 1957, Rapacki formally presented his plan, which he argued would protect the peace of Europe. The plan was rejected by the United States under the grounds that it would weaken NATO by keeping nuclear weapons out of West Germany, through in private Eisenhower thought there was merit to Rapacki's desire to prevent German reunification.

During the Vietnam war, Poland was one of the three powers along with Canada and India that formed the International Control Commission (ICC) that supervised the Geneva Accords, and as such Polish diplomats were often involved in plans to end the Vietnam war. The Polish delegation to the ICC were allowed to tour both Vietnams and were in contact with the leaders in both Hanoi and Saigon, making them ideal intermediaries. When Rapacki visited New Delhi in January 1963, the American ambassador to India, John Kenneth Galbraith met with him to declare his "despair" about the Kennedy administration's policies in Vietnam and asked for his good offers to have Poland as an ICC member assist with finding a diplomatic solution to the Vietnam war. Galbratih remained in regular contact with Przemysław Ogrodziński, the Polish ambassador to India, in seeking a diplomatic solution to the war. Later in 1963, the Polish Commissioner to the ICC, Mieczysław Maneli, was involved in the so-called "Maneli affair", a plan to end the Vietnam war by creating a federation of the two Vietnams. In 1966, the Polish diplomat Janusz Lewandowski who served as the Polish commissioner to the ICC played a key role in Operation Marigold, an attempt to broker an end to the Vietnam war. Lewandowski met in Saigon with Henry Cabot Lodge Jr., the American ambassador to South Vietnam, to present a plan for a "bombing pause" of North Vietnam as way to begin peace talks.

In the 1960s, Gomułka's unwillingness to break with the Soviet Union and the negative attitude toward Israel during the Six-Day War caused those relations to stagnate. Polish-American relations improved once more after Edward Gierek had succeeded Gomułka. A consular agreement was signed under in 1972. In 1974, Gierek was the first Polish communist head of state to visit the United States. That action, among others, demonstrated that both sides wished to facilitate better relations.

The birth of Solidarity in 1980 raised the hope that progress would be made in Poland's external relations as well as in its domestic development. The United States provided $765 million in agricultural assistance and loans. Human rights and individual freedom issues, however, were not improved, and the US revoked Poland's most-favored-nation (MFN) status in response to the decision to ban on the Solidarity movement in 1981 and to instigate martial law by the communist Polish United Workers' Party. MFN status was reinstated in 1987.

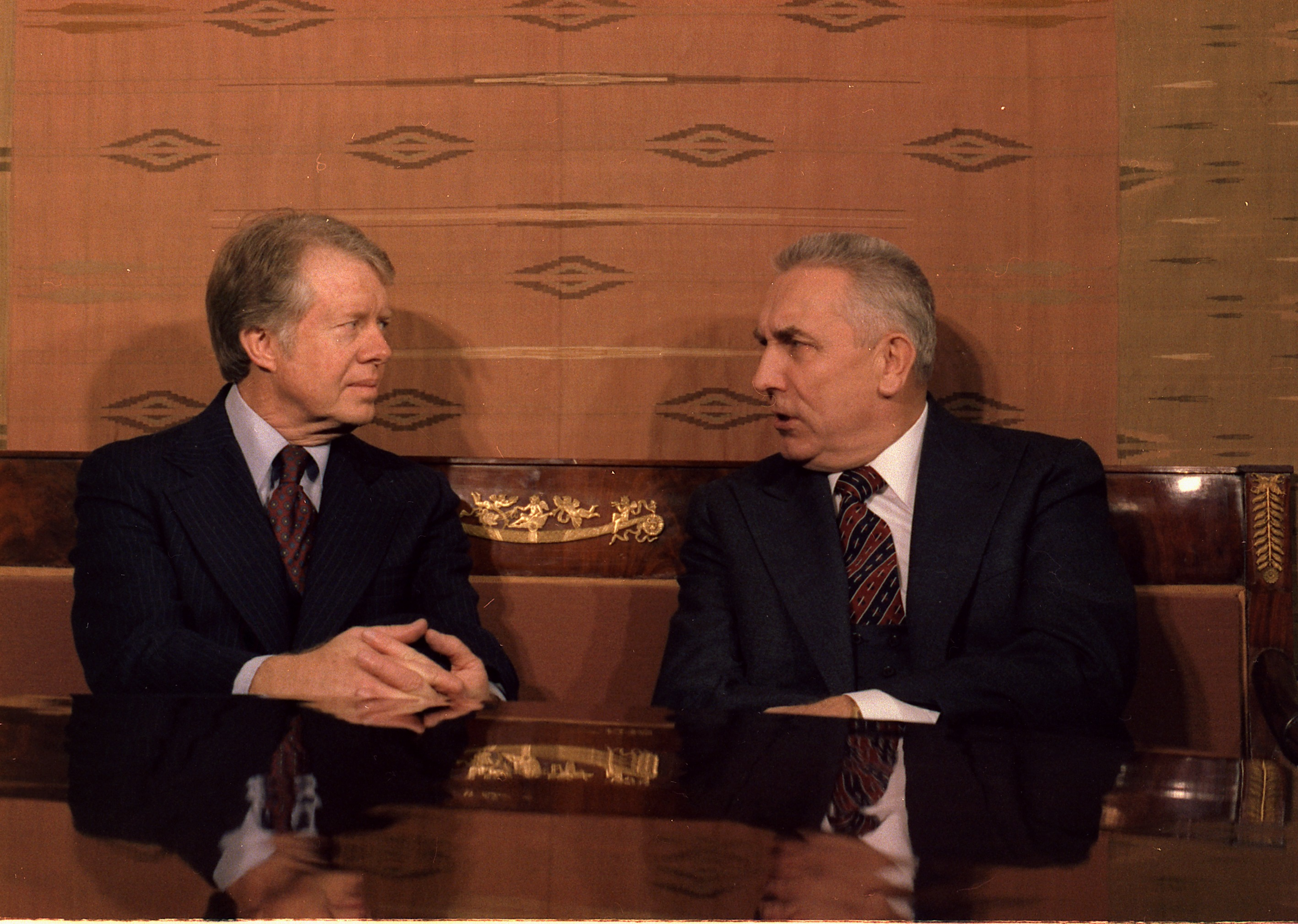
Gierek and President Jimmy Carter, 1977

The Reagan administration engaged in clandestine support for Solidarity, and CIA money was channeled through third parties. CIA officers were barred from meeting Solidarity leaders, and their contacts with Solidarnosc activists were weaker than those of the AFL–CIO, which raised $300,000 from its members to provide material and cash directly to Solidarity. The US Congress authorized the National Endowment for Democracy to promote democracy, and it allocated $10 million to Solidarity. CIA support for Solidarity besides money included equipment and training, which was co-ordinated by the Special Operations division of the CIA. Henry Hyde, a member of the US House Intelligence Committee, stated that the US provided "supplies and technical assistance in terms of clandestine newspapers, broadcasting, propaganda, money, organizational help and advice." Michael Reisman from Yale Law School named operations in Poland as one of the covert actions of CIA during Cold War. Initial funds for covert actions by the CIA were $2 million, but soon, authorizations were increased, and by 1985, the CIA had successfully infiltrated Poland.

When the Polish government launched a crackdown of its own in December 1981, however, Solidarity was not alerted. Potential explanations for that vary; some believe that the CIA was caught off guard, but others suggest that American policymakers viewed an internal crackdown as preferable to an "inevitable Soviet intervention."

== Third Polish Republic ==
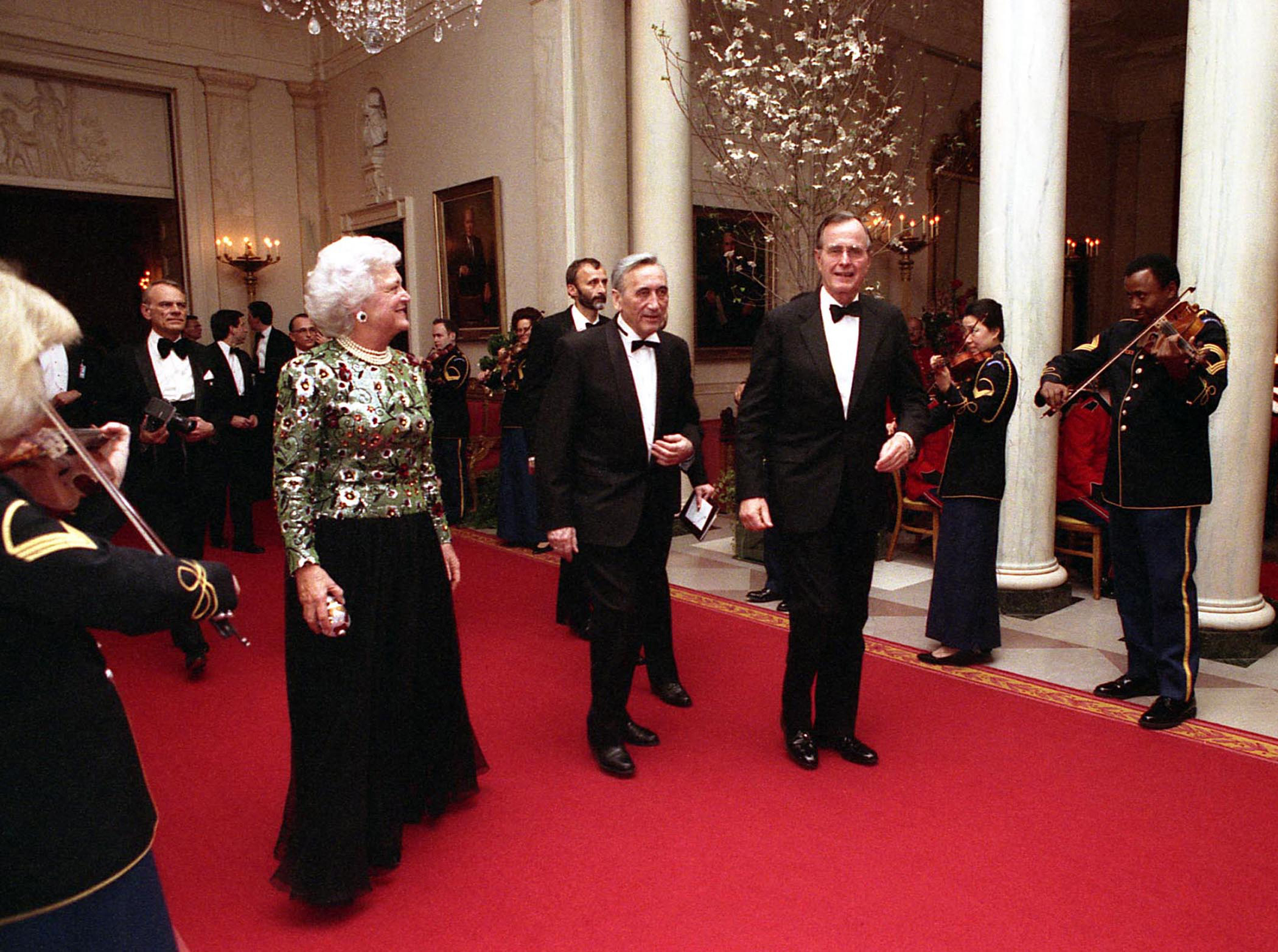
Prime Minister Tadeusz Mazowiecki with George H. W. Bush in White House, 1990

The United States and Poland have enjoyed warm bilateral relations since 1989. Every post-1989 Polish government has been a strong supporter of continued American military and economic presence in Europe, and Poland is one of the most stable allies of the United States.

When Poland joined NATO on March 12, 1999, the two countries became part of the same military alliance. As well as supporting the Global War on Terror, Operation Enduring Freedom in Afghanistan, and coalition efforts in Iraq (where the Polish contingent was one of the largest), Poland co-operates closely with the United States on such issues as democratization, nuclear proliferation, human rights, regional co-operation in Central and Eastern Europe, and reform of the United Nations.

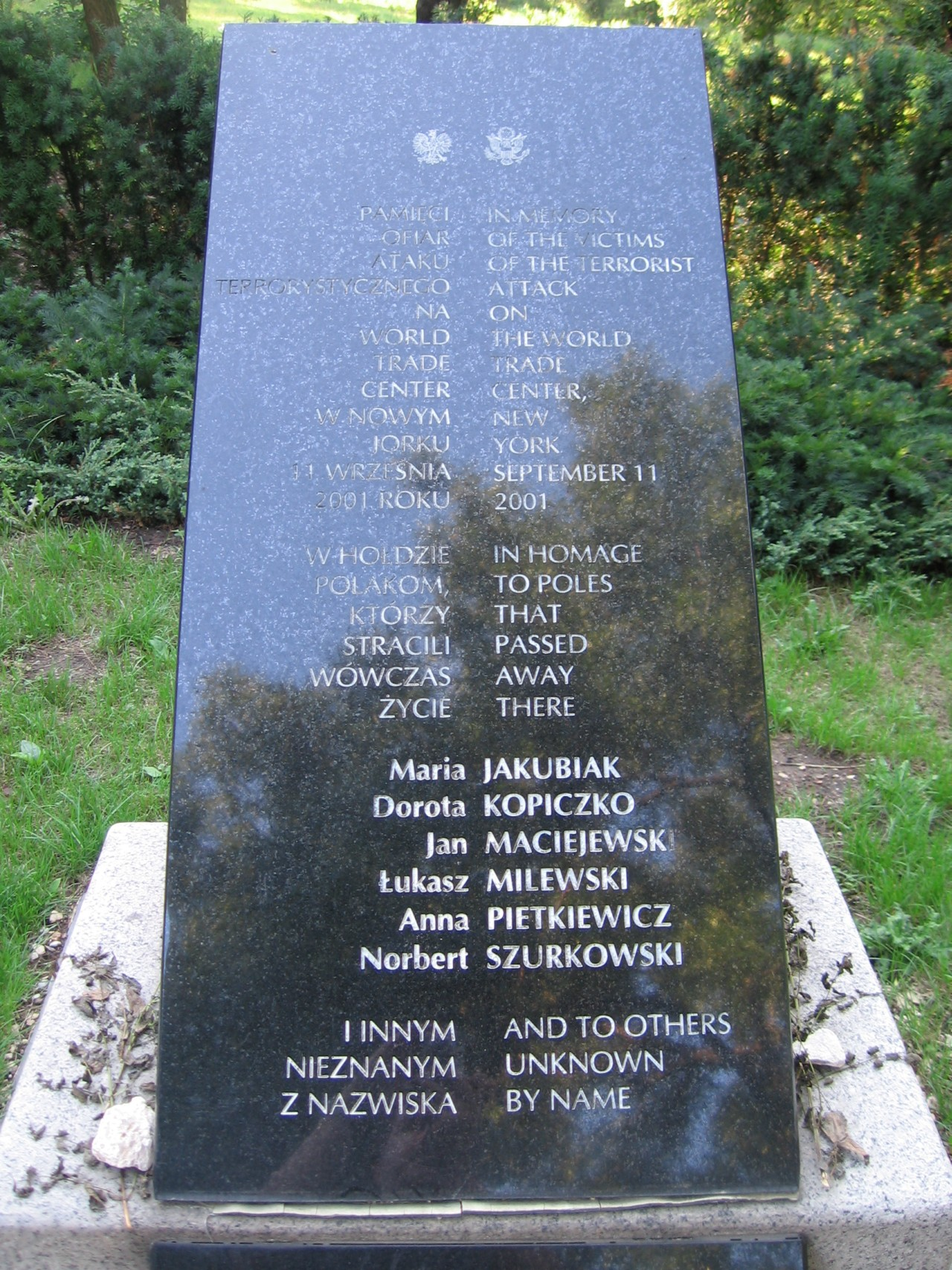
Monument, at Skaryszew Park, Warsaw, to Polish victims of the Manhattan September 11 attacks

On 11 September 2001, 6 Polish citizens perished at the World Trade Center in New York City during the September 11 attacks. The monument for Polish 9/11 victims at Skaryszew Park in Warsaw was unveiled by Polish President Aleksander Kwaśniewski on 11 September 2002, the 1st anniversary of the attacks.

In 2004, the Polish diplomat Piotr Ogrodziński stated: "This is a country that thinks seriously about its security. There's no doubt that for such a country, it's good to be a close ally of the United States". In 2004, Ogrodziński spoke to the American media his concerns over what he felt was a lack of American gratitude for Poland's contribution to the Iraq war while denying Poles visa free travel to the United States, saying: "It's very hard to explain why one Polish kid is risking his life in Iraq and another kid is being stopped at the U.S. border because he happened to land in the wrong city".

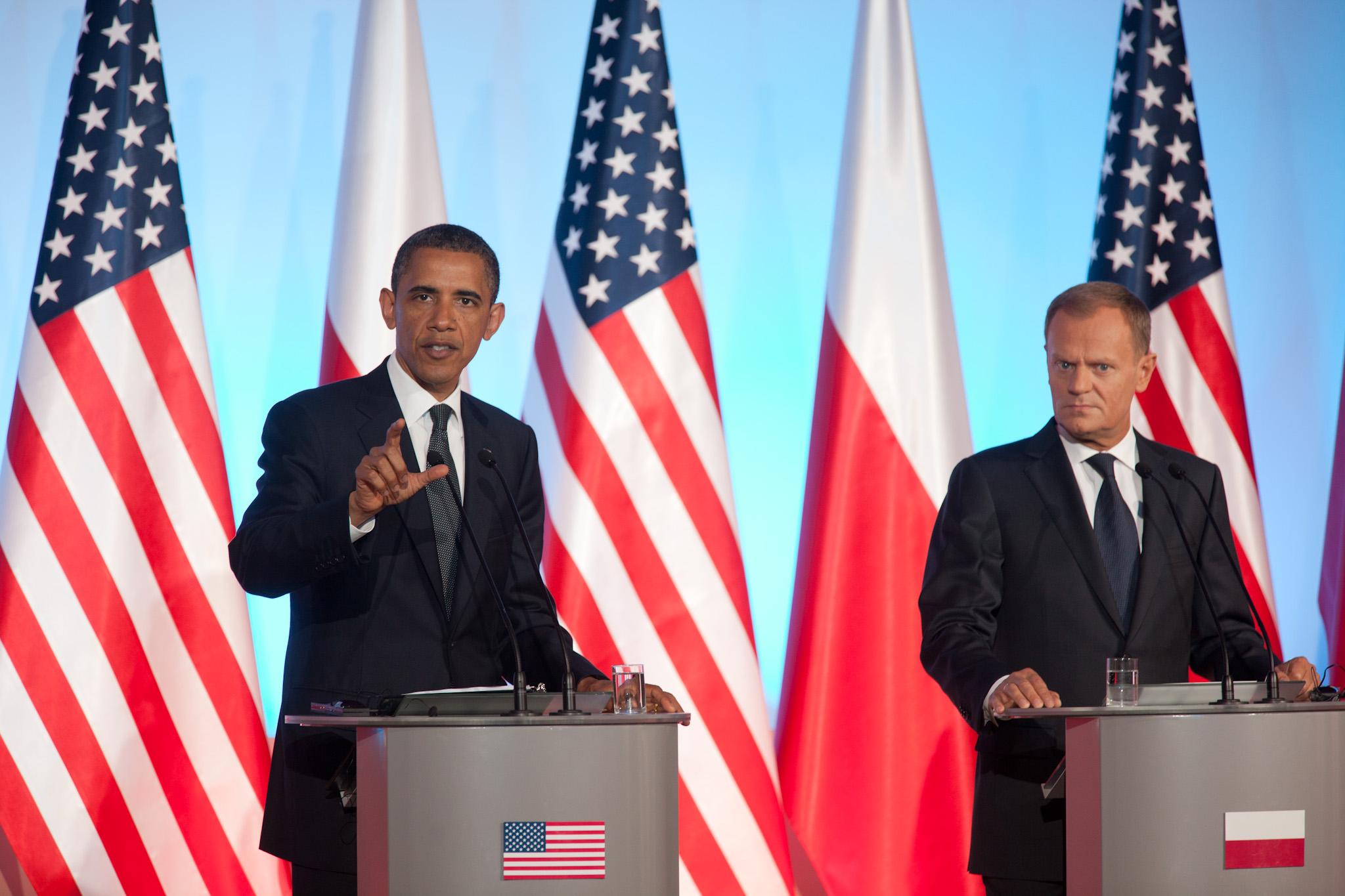
US President Barack Obama at a bilateral meeting in Warsaw with Polish Prime Minister Donald Tusk, July 2011

US President Barack Obama visited Poland on 27–28 May 2011 and met with Polish Prime Minister Donald Tusk and President Bronisław Komorowski. The American and Polish leaders discussed economic, military and technology cooperation issues.

In July 2017, Donald Trump in his second foreign travel visited Poland. He met with Polish President Andrzej Duda. Both then held a joint press conference in the Royal Castle, Warsaw. Trump thanked the Polish people and Duda for the warm welcome that he had received in Warsaw: "Our strong alliance with Poland and NATO remains critical to deterring conflict and ensuring that war between great powers never again ravages Europe, and that the world will be a safer and better place. America is committed to maintaining peace and security in Central and Eastern Europe."

President Trump also spoke with European leaders attending the Three Seas Initiative Summit in Warsaw."

In 2018, Poland proposed for the United States open a permanent military base within its country. The Polish government would finance around $2 billion of the cost of hosting American forces, if the proposal was accepted by the United States. Poland has proposed Bydgoszcz or Toruń as potential base locations. Since 1999, Poland has sought closer military ties with the United States. In an apparent attempt to win favor, it was suggested by President Andrzej Duda in 2018 that the proposed American military base in Poland be named "Fort Trump", a choice of name that provoked controversy with many Poles charging that Duda was trying too hard to flatter Trump. Opinion within the Pentagon was divided about the merits of permanently stationing an U.S. Army armored division in Poland as the Polish government wanted. Some U.S. Army generals charged that it would strain U.S. Army resources too far and that the proposed location of "Fort Trump" was too exposed to Russian rockets. Other generals argued that having an armored division stationed in Poland was preferable to the current system of rotation as it would allow the troops to get to know the country better. In June 2019, both sides agreed to send 1,000 US troops to Poland. In September 2019, six locations were determined to host approximately 4,500 from the US military in Poland, including: Poznań, Drawsko Pomorskie, Strachowice, Łask, Powidz and Lubliniec.

On 24 June 2020, Trump said at a press conference with Duda that the United States plans to move some US troops from Germany to Poland. Trump said, "Poland is one of the few countries that are fulfilling their obligations under NATO — in particular, their monetary obligations — and they asked us if we would send some additional troops.... I think [putting more US troops in Poland] sends a very strong signal to Russia."

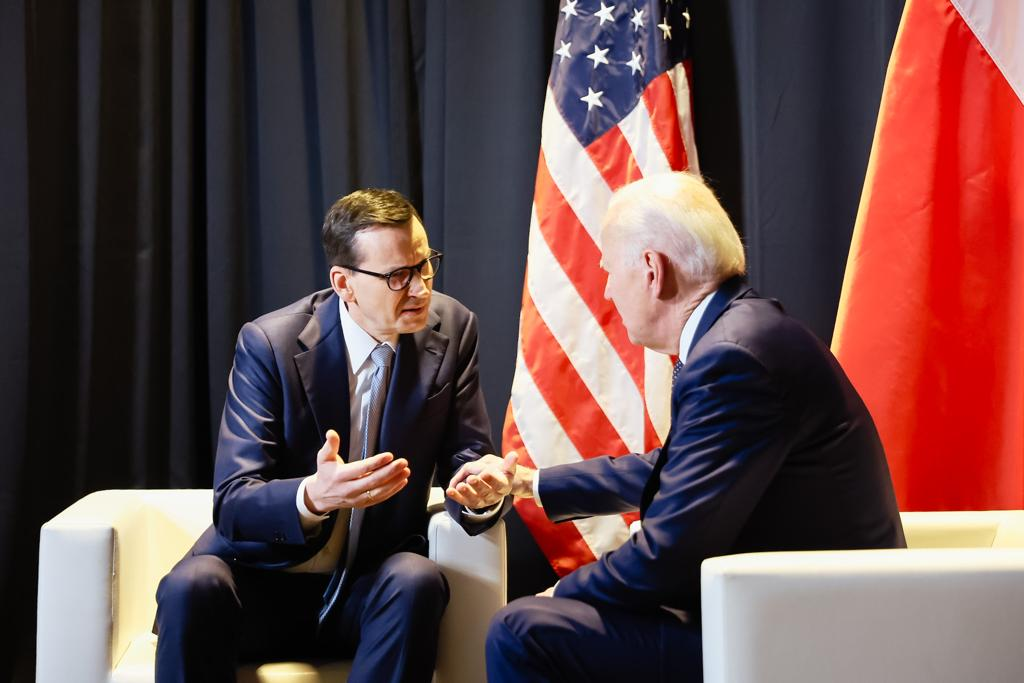
US President Joe Biden meeting with Polish Prime Minister Mateusz Morawiecki in Warsaw, February 2023

Duda was very close to Trump, which led to strained ties in 2021 under the new administration of Joe Biden. In addition, the perception that the conservative PiS government was undermining the rule of law and its hostility towards gay rights made for difficult American-Polish relations. Liberal American opinion tends to be supportive of gay rights and the practice of several Polish regional governments declaring themselves to be "LGBT-free zones" has led to criticism in the United States. Joe Biden in a 2020 statement declared that the "LGBT-free zones" in Poland “have no place in the European Union or anywhere in the world." In an implicit criticism of the PiS government, on 30 June 2021 the American embassy in Warsaw released a Polish language internet video supportive of gay rights, a move that was condemned by some Poles as interference in Poland's internal affairs. The American chargé d'affaires at the Warsaw embassy, Bix Aliu, stated that the video was about anti-gay comments being made on social media.

The Russian aggression against Ukraine with the invasion launched on 24 February 2022 led to the Biden administration doing a U-turn on Poland, which was now embraced as a close ally. Alina Polyakova, president of the Washington-based Center for European Policy Analysis stated in March 2022: "Given the situation, the administration is clearly prioritizing defense and security in the relationship. Poland is the indispensable ally for European security. Other issues and concerns have just taken a back seat. When push comes to shove, and there is a direct military threat to NATO, we need Poland. It doesn’t mean that all is forgiven, but it makes it very clear where the priorities are.” Biden visited Warsaw in March 2022 in a show of support for a frontline NATO state.

On 21 May 2026, U.S. President Donald Trump announced that the United States would deploy an additional 5,000 troops to Poland. Trump linked the decision to relations with Polish President Karol Nawrocki and ongoing security cooperation between the two countries. The announcement followed broader discussions regarding the reassessment of U.S. military deployments in Europe amid tensions between Washington and several European allies over the Iran conflict and possible reductions of American troop presence in Germany.

== Issues ==
=== Radosław Sikorski ===
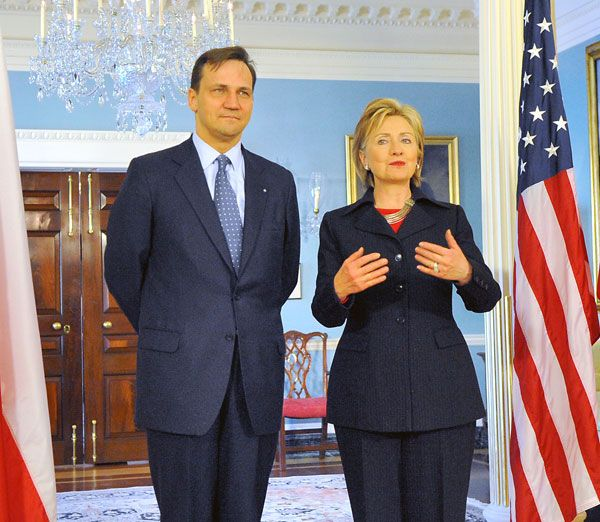
Foreign Minister Sikorski meets US Secretary of State Hillary Clinton, February 2009

Despite their apparently close relationship, Wprost (a Polish magazine) obtained a recording of Polish Foreign Minister Radosław Sikorski calling the Polish-American alliance "downright harmful" and causing a "false sense of security." while in a poll made in 2016, around 20% of questioned considered Americans a potential threat to Polish national security. Despite that, also in this poll, more than 50% of questioned considered Americans and Canadians as trustworthy.

=== US missile defense complex in Poland ===
The US missile defense complex in Poland was part of the Ballistic Missile Defense European Capability of the US, to be placed in Redzikowo, Słupsk, Poland, forming a Ground-Based Midcourse Defense system in conjunction with a US narrow-beam midcourse tracking and discrimination radar system in the Brdy, Czech Republic. The plan was cancelled in 2009.

Polish society was divided on the issue. According to a poll by SMG/KRC released by TVP 50 per cent of respondents rejected the deployment of the shield on Polish soil, while 36 per cent supported it.

In October 2009, with a trip by Vice President Joe Biden to Warsaw, a new, smaller interceptor project on roughly the same schedule as the Bush administration plan, was introduced, and welcomed by Prime Minister Donald Tusk.

=== "Polish death camps" ===
In May 2012, during a Medal of Freedom ceremony, US President Obama referred to the concentration camps run by Nazis in Poland during World War II as "Polish death camps," a term that Polish Prime Minister Donald Tusk said showed "ignorance, lack of knowledge and ill will." Calling them "Polish death camps", Tusk said, implied that Poland was responsible and that "there had been no Nazis, no German responsibility, no Hitler."

After a White House spokesman issued a regret of misstatement by clarifying that the President was referring to the Nazi death camps, Tusk expressed an expectation of "a reaction more inclined to eliminate once and for all these kinds of errors."

=== "2021 Polish Media Law" ===
Lex TVN is a controversial 2021 Polish media law which modifies the Polish Broadcasting Act. It forbids companies except those from the European Economic Area from holding more than a 49% stake in Polish radio and television stations. However, opposition, as well as representatives from European Union and the United States criticized it as it would force American company Discovery to divert itself from the biggest television network in Poland, TVN, which has been often critical of the PiS-led government; Polish opposition and some international observers expressed fear that the law is threatening press freedom in Poland. The law has been criticized for "threatening the largest ever US investment in Poland".

== Public opinion ==
In a survey conducted by the National Research Group (Ogólnopolska Grupa Badawcza) on behalf of the National Polish-American Foundation, Polish citizens were asked which country would be the leading power of the 21st century. In response, 51% of those surveyed identified China as the power of the future, while only 34% saw the USA in that role, which is also linked to a significant decline in Poles' fondness for Americans. Meanwhile, 14% of respondents believed that neither of the two nations would be the leading power.

A July 2026 Public First study for POLITICO found that 44% of Poles support a dual-track strategy combining defense ties with the US and economic cooperation with China. The poll also indicates that 35% of Poles view China as Europe’s most important future trading partner, reflecting the growing divide between Washington and Beijing.

Results from the IBRiS Institute for Market and Social Research for PAP (Polish Press Agency) show a sharp decline in Poles' favorable view of the USA. Americans received less than 50 percent positive ratings (49% positive, 11% negative, 41% neutral).

== Gallery ==
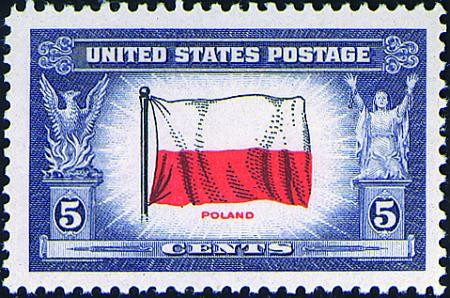
Poland was one of the countries overrun by Nazi Germany. The country was recognized by the United States, which issued the stamp in 1943 in Poland's honor.

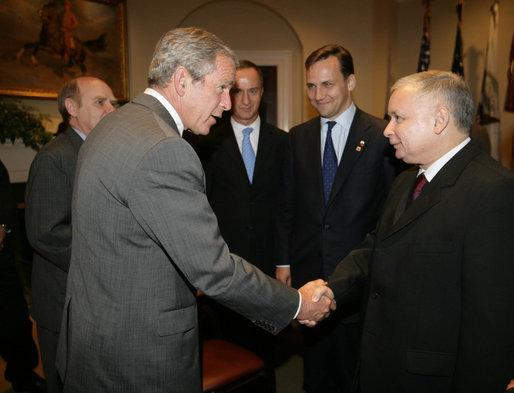
Polish Prime Minister Jarosław Kaczyński during conversation with US President George W. Bush in White House, 2006

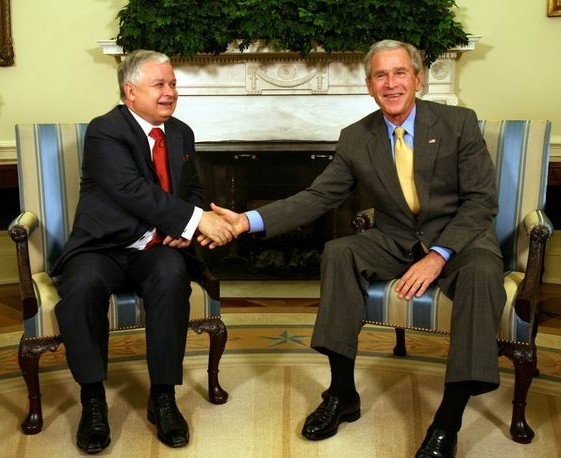
Polish President Lech Kaczyński meets with US President George W. Bush, July 2007

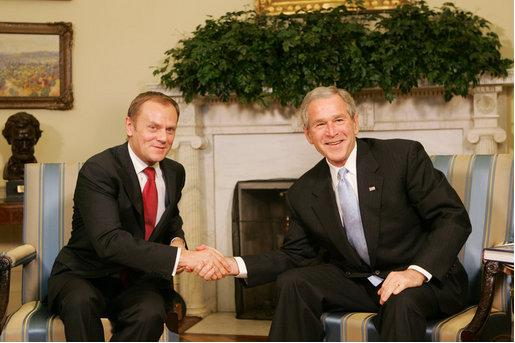
Polish Prime Minister Donald Tusk meets with US President George W. Bush, February 2008

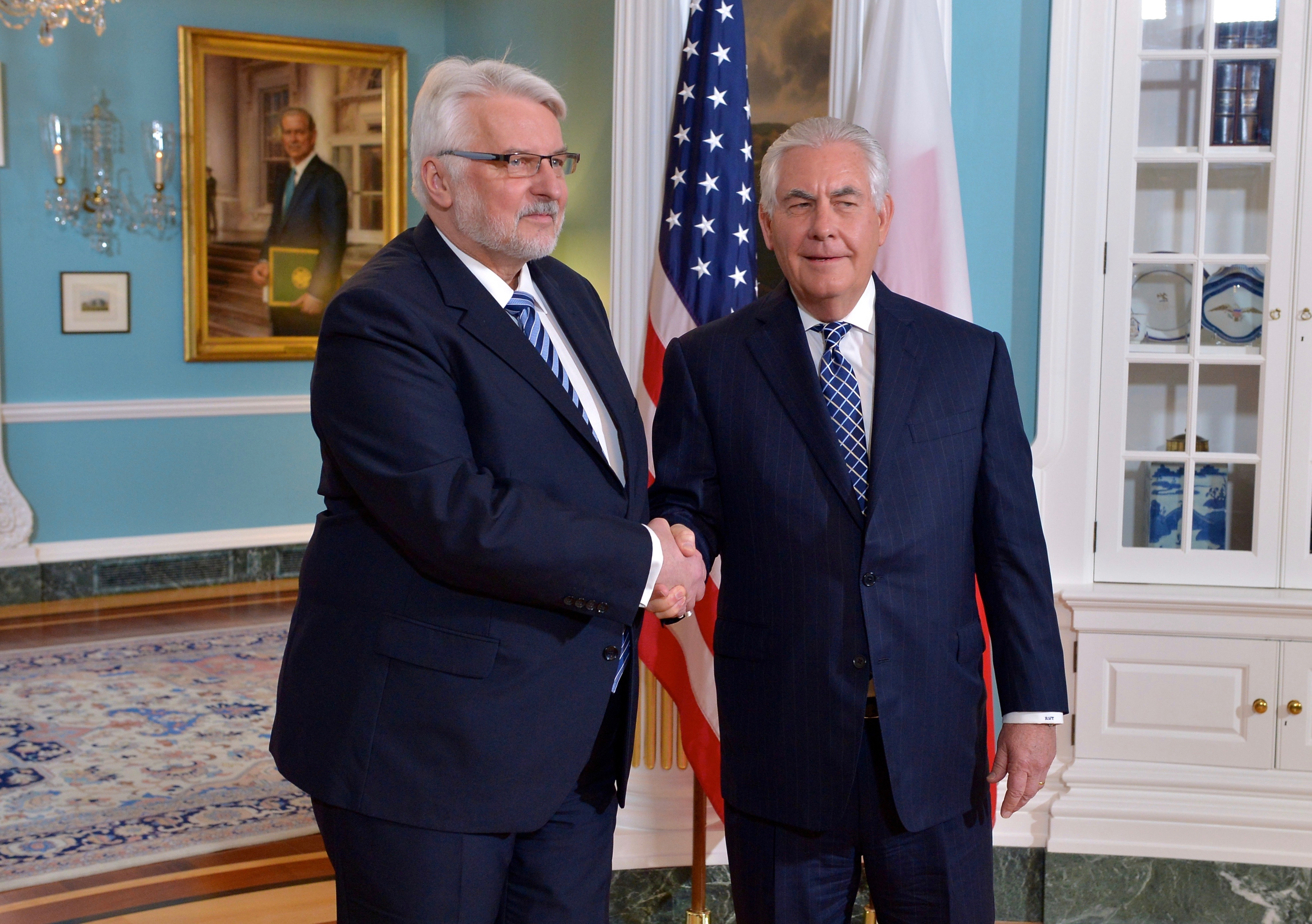
Polish Minister of Foreign Affairs Witold Waszczykowski and US Secretary of State Rex Tillerson, 2017

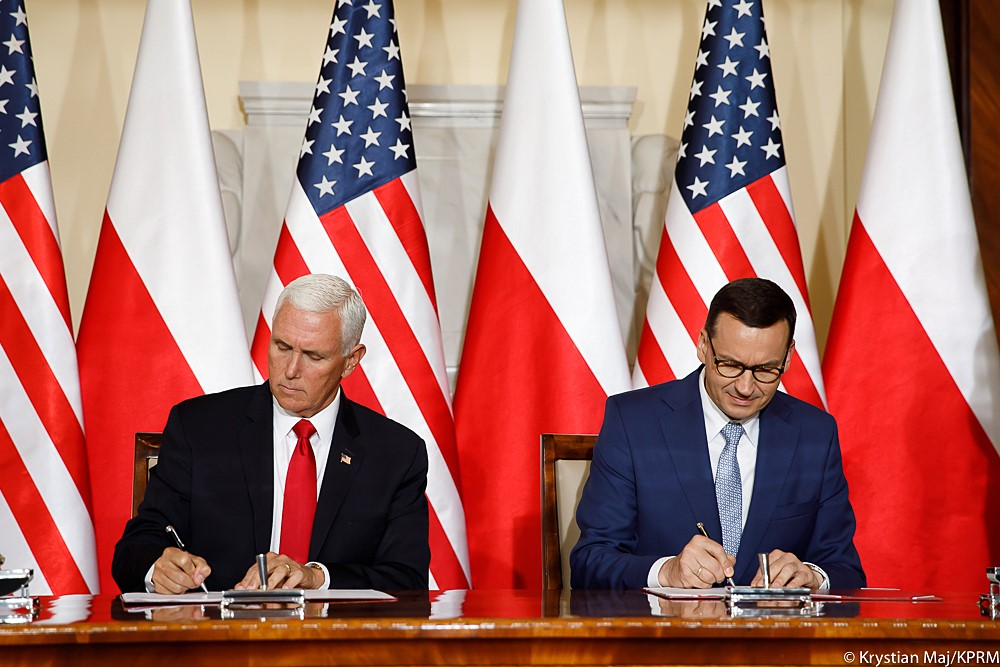
Vice President Mike Pence and Polish Prime Minister Mateusz Morawiecki signed joint declaration on 5G, 2019

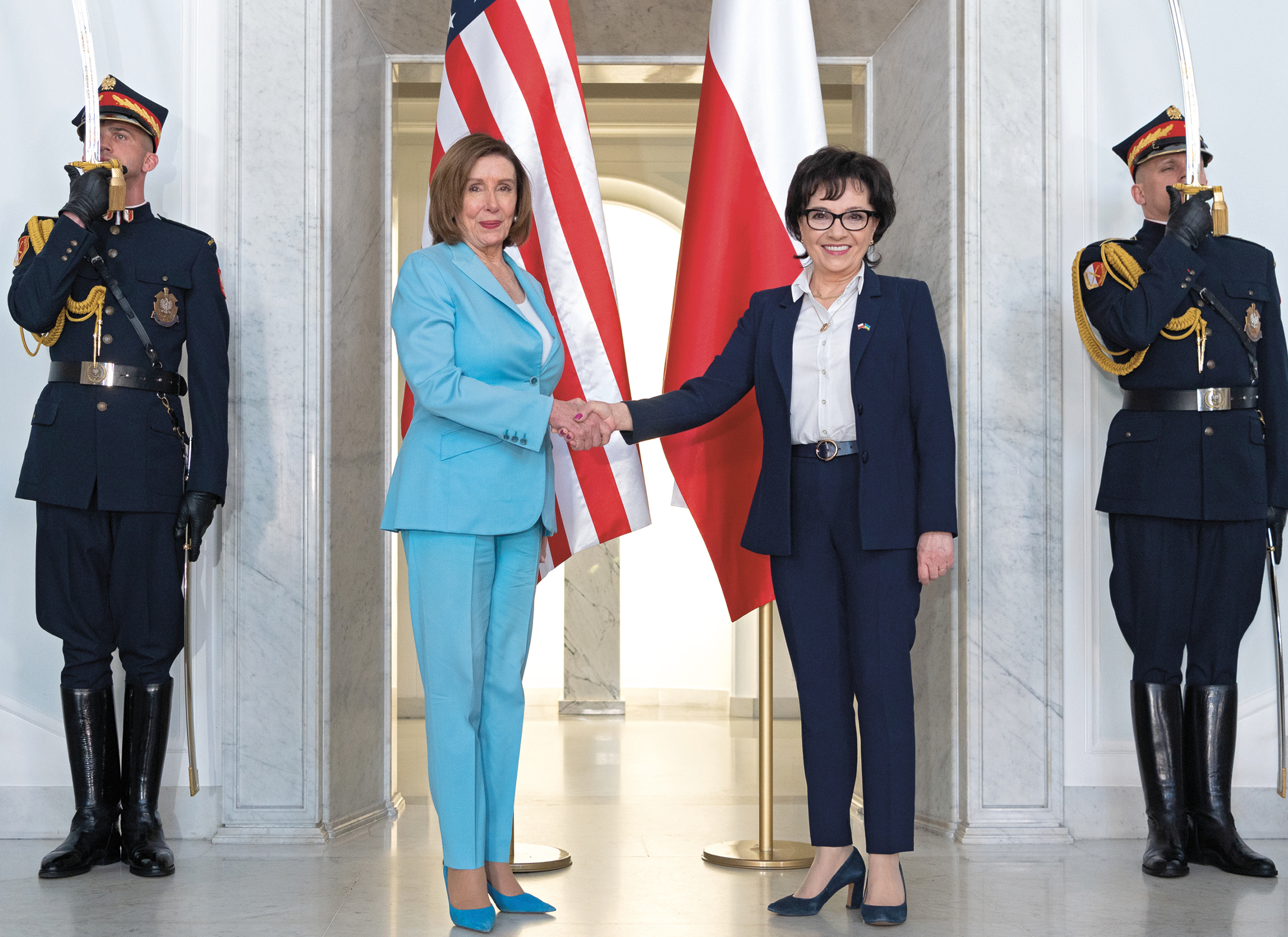
Marshal (Speaker) of Sejm Elżbieta Witek with House Speaker Nancy Pelosi, June 2022

== High-level mutual visits ==
Guest	Host	Place of visit	Date of visit
(Poland) Prime Minister Władysław Sikorski	(United States) President Franklin D. Roosevelt	Washington, D.C., New York City, Palm Beach, and Chicago	April 6–10, 1941
(Poland) Prime Minister Władysław Sikorski	(United States) President Franklin D. Roosevelt	Washington, D.C., New York City	March 23–30, 1941
(Poland) Prime Minister Władysław Sikorski	(United States) President Franklin D. Roosevelt	Washington, D.C., New York City	December 2–3, 1942
(Poland) Prime Minister Władysław Sikorski	(United States) President Franklin D. Roosevelt	Washington, D.C., New York City	January 1–5, 1943
(Poland) Prime Minister Stanisław Mikołajczyk	(United States) President Franklin D. Roosevelt	Washington, D.C.	June 5–14, 1944
(United States) President Richard Nixon	(Polish People's Republic) First Secretary Edward Gierek	Warsaw	May 31 – June 1, 1972
(Polish People's Republic) First Secretary Edward Gierek	(United States) President Gerald Ford	Washington, D.C., Williamsburg, New York City, Pennsylvania, and Texas	October 6–13, 1974
(United States) President Gerald Ford	(Polish People's Republic) First Secretary Edward Gierek	Warsaw, Kraków	July 26–28, 1975
(United States) President Jimmy Carter	(Polish People's Republic) First Secretary Edward Gierek	Warsaw	December 29–31, 1977
(United States) President George H. W. Bush	(Polish People's Republic) First Secretary Wojciech Jaruzelski (Polish People's Republic) Prime Minister Mieczysław Rakowski	Warsaw, Gdańsk	July 9–11, 1989
(Poland) Prime Minister Tadeusz Mazowiecki	(United States) President George H. W. Bush	Washington, D.C., Chicago	May 20–23, 1990
(Poland) Prime Minister Tadeusz Mazowiecki	(United States) President George H. W. Bush	New York City	September 29, 1990
(Poland) President Lech Wałęsa	(United States) President George H. W. Bush	Washington, D.C., Los Angeles, Chicago, and New York City	March 19–22, 1991
(Poland) Prime Minister Jan Krzysztof Bielecki	(United States) President George H. W. Bush	Washington, D.C.	September 11, 1991
(Poland) Prime Minister Jan Olszewski	(United States) President George H. W. Bush	Washington, D.C.	April 13–14, 1992
(United States) President George H. W. Bush	(Poland) President Lech Wałęsa	Warsaw	July 5, 1992
(Poland) President Lech Wałęsa	(United States) President Bill Clinton	Washington, D.C.	April 20–22, 1993
(United States) President Bill Clinton	(Poland) President Lech Wałęsa (Poland) Prime Minister Waldemar Pawlak	Warsaw	July 6–7, 1994
(Poland) President Aleksander Kwaśniewski	(United States) President Bill Clinton	Washington, D.C.	July 9–10, 1996
(United States) President Bill Clinton	(Poland) President Aleksander Kwaśniewski (Poland) Prime Minister Włodzimierz Cimoszewicz	Warsaw	July 10–11, 1997
(Poland) Prime Minister Jerzy Buzek	(United States) President Bill Clinton	Washington, D.C.	July 8–10, 1998
(Poland) President Aleksander Kwaśniewski (Poland) Prime Minister Jerzy Buzek	(United States) President Bill Clinton	Washington, D.C.	April 23–25, 1999
(United States) President George W. Bush	(Poland) President Aleksander Kwaśniewski (Poland) Prime Minister Jerzy Buzek	Warsaw	June 15–16, 2001
(Poland) Prime Minister Leszek Miller	(United States) President George W. Bush	Washington, D.C.	January 10–11, 2002
(Poland) President Aleksander Kwaśniewski	(United States) President George W. Bush	Washington, D.C., Troy	July 17–18, 2002
(Poland) President Aleksander Kwaśniewski	(United States) President George W. Bush	Washington, D.C.	January 12–14, 2003
(Poland) Prime Minister Leszek Miller	(United States) President George W. Bush	Washington, D.C.	February 4–7, 2003
(United States) President George W. Bush	(Poland) President Aleksander Kwaśniewski (Poland) Prime Minister Leszek Miller	Kraków, Auschwitz-Birkenau	May 30–31, 2003
(Poland) President Aleksander Kwaśniewski	(United States) President George W. Bush	Washington, D.C.	January 26–27, 2004
(Poland) Prime Minister Marek Belka	(United States) President George W. Bush	Washington, D.C.	August 6–7, 2004
(Poland) President Aleksander Kwaśniewski	(United States) President George W. Bush	Washington, D.C.	February 8–9, 2005
(Poland) President Aleksander Kwaśniewski	(United States) President George W. Bush	Washington, D.C.	October 12, 2005
(Poland) President Lech Kaczyński	(United States) President George W. Bush	Washington, D.C.	February 8–10, 2006
(United States) President George W. Bush	(Poland) President Lech Kaczyński	Gdańsk, Jurata	June 8, 2007
(Poland) President Lech Kaczyński (Poland) Prime Minister Jarosław Kaczyński	(United States) President George W. Bush	Washington, D.C.	July 15–17, 2007
(Poland) Prime Minister Donald Tusk	(United States) President George W. Bush	Washington, D.C.	March 9–10, 2008
(Poland) President Bronisław Komorowski	(United States) President Barack Obama	Washington, D.C.	December 8, 2010
(United States) President Barack Obama	(Poland) President Bronisław Komorowski (Poland) Prime Minister Donald Tusk	Warsaw	May 27–28, 2011
(Poland) President Bronisław Komorowski	(United States) President Barack Obama	Chicago	May 20–21, 2012
(United States) President Barack Obama	(Poland) President Bronisław Komorowski (Poland) Prime Minister Donald Tusk	Warsaw	June 3–4, 2014
(Poland) President Andrzej Duda	(United States) President Barack Obama	Washington, D.C.	March 31 – April 1, 2016
(United States) President Barack Obama	(Poland) President Andrzej Duda	Warsaw	July 7–9, 2016
(United States) President Donald Trump	(Poland) President Andrzej Duda	Warsaw	July 5–6, 2017
(Poland) President Andrzej Duda	(United States) President Donald Trump	Washington, D.C.	September 18, 2018
(United States) Vice President Mike Pence	(Poland) President Andrzej Duda (Poland) Prime Minister Mateusz Morawiecki	Warsaw	February 13–14, 2019
(Poland) Prime Minister Mateusz Morawiecki	(United States) President Donald Trump	Washington, D.C.	April 17–19, 2019
(Poland) President Andrzej Duda	(United States) President Donald Trump	Washington, D.C.	June 12, 2019
(Poland) President Andrzej Duda	(United States) President Donald Trump	Washington, D.C.	June 24, 2020
(United States) Vice President Kamala Harris	(Poland) President Andrzej Duda (Poland) Prime Minister Mateusz Morawiecki	Warsaw	March 10, 2022
(United States) President Joe Biden	(Poland) President Andrzej Duda (Poland) Prime Minister Mateusz Morawiecki	Warsaw, Rzeszów	March 26–27, 2022
(United States) President Joe Biden	(Poland) President Andrzej Duda (Poland) Prime Minister Mateusz Morawiecki	Warsaw	February 21–22, 2023
(Poland) Prime Minister Mateusz Morawiecki	(United States) Vice President Kamala Harris	Washington, D.C.	April 11–13, 2023
(Poland) President Andrzej Duda (Poland) Prime Minister Donald Tusk	(United States) President Joe Biden	Washington, D.C.	March 12, 2024
(Poland) President Karol Nawrocki	(United States) President Donald Trump	Washington, D.C.	September 3, 2025

== Resident diplomatic missions ==
of Poland in the United States

- Washington, D.C. (Embassy)
- Chicago (Consulate-General)
- Houston (Consulate-General)
- Los Angeles (Consulate-General)
- New York City (Consulate-General)

of the United States in Poland

- Warsaw (Embassy)
- Kraków (Consulate-General)
- Poznań (Consular Agency)

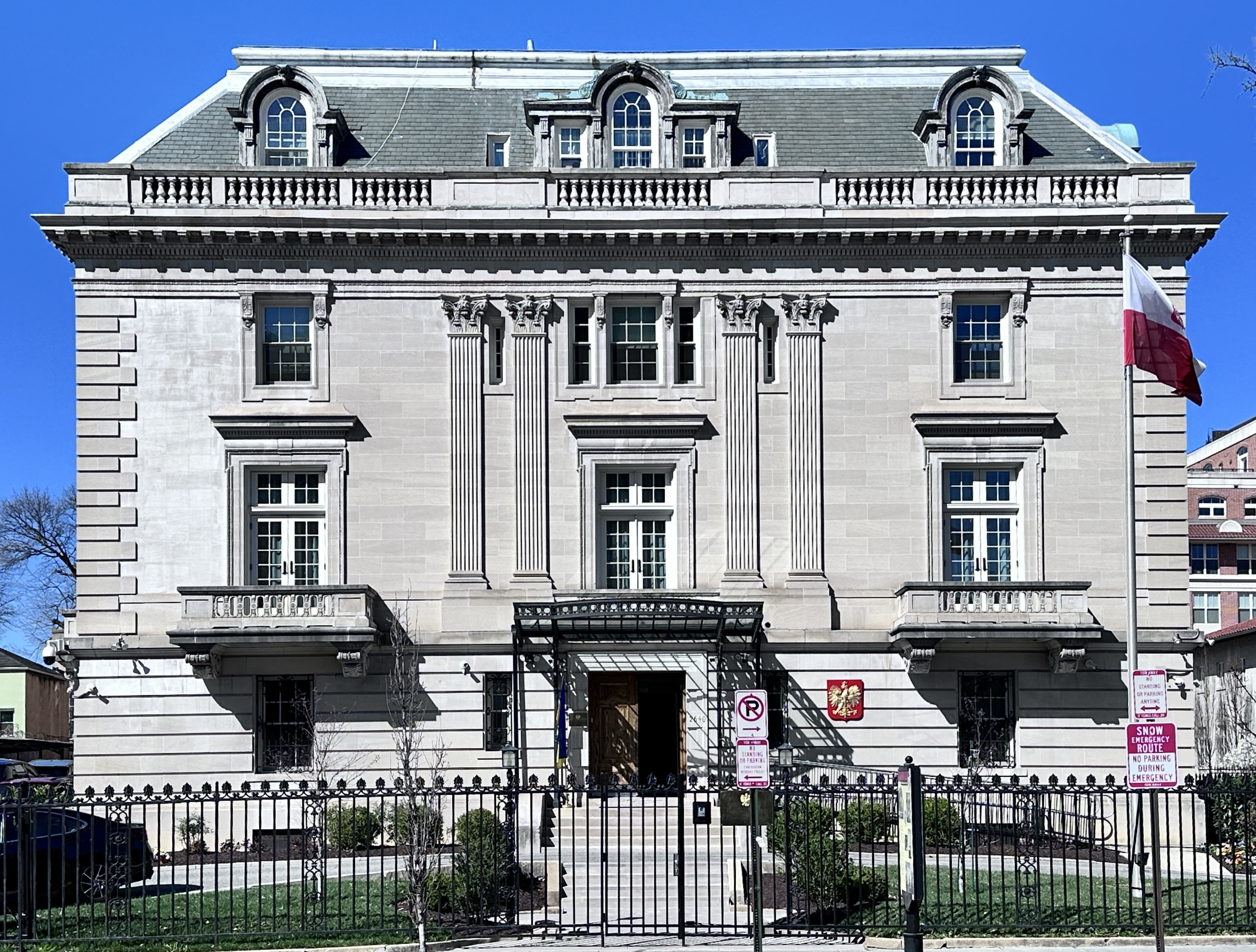
Embassy of Poland in Washington, D.C.

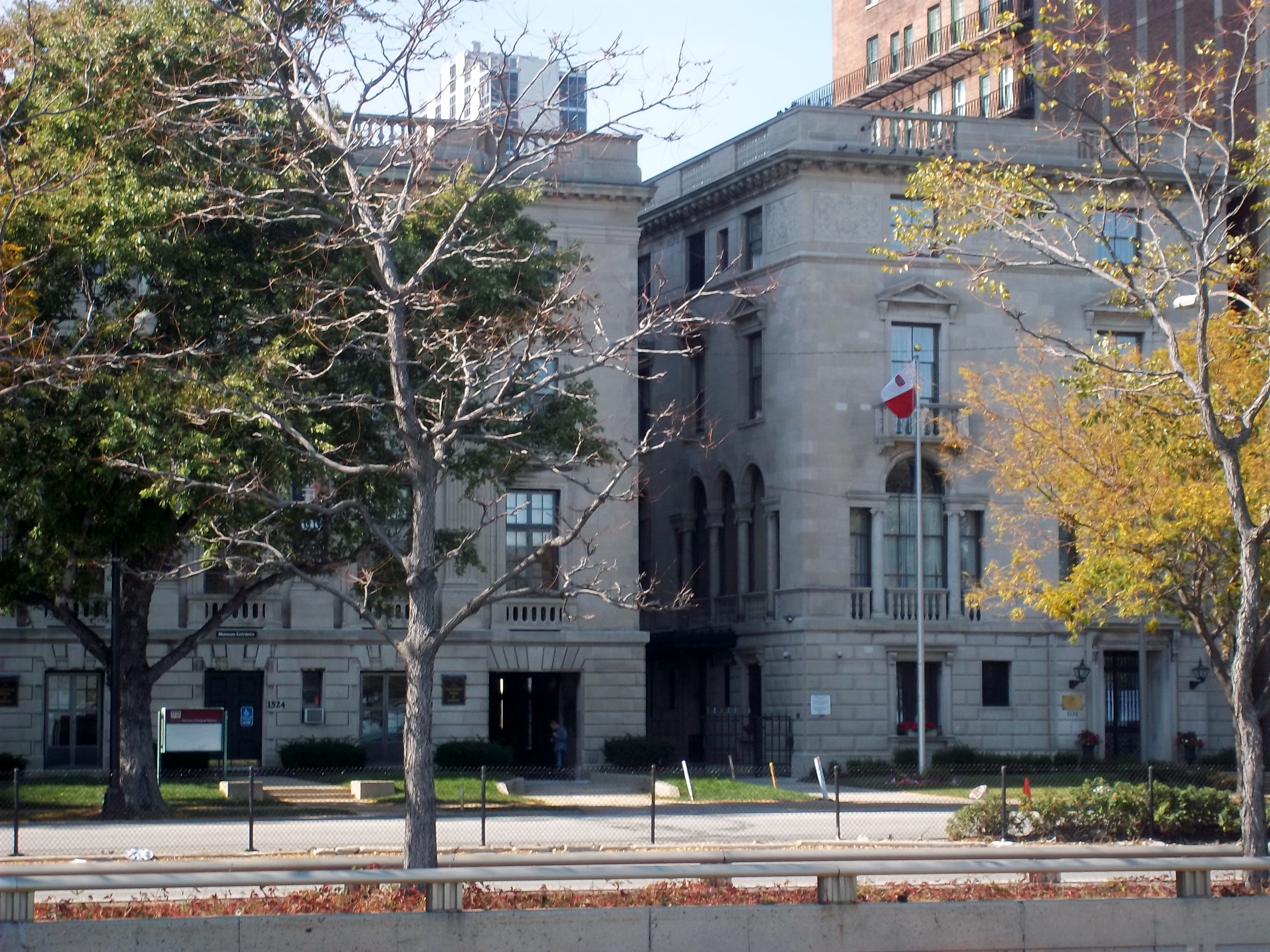
Consulate-General of Poland in Chicago

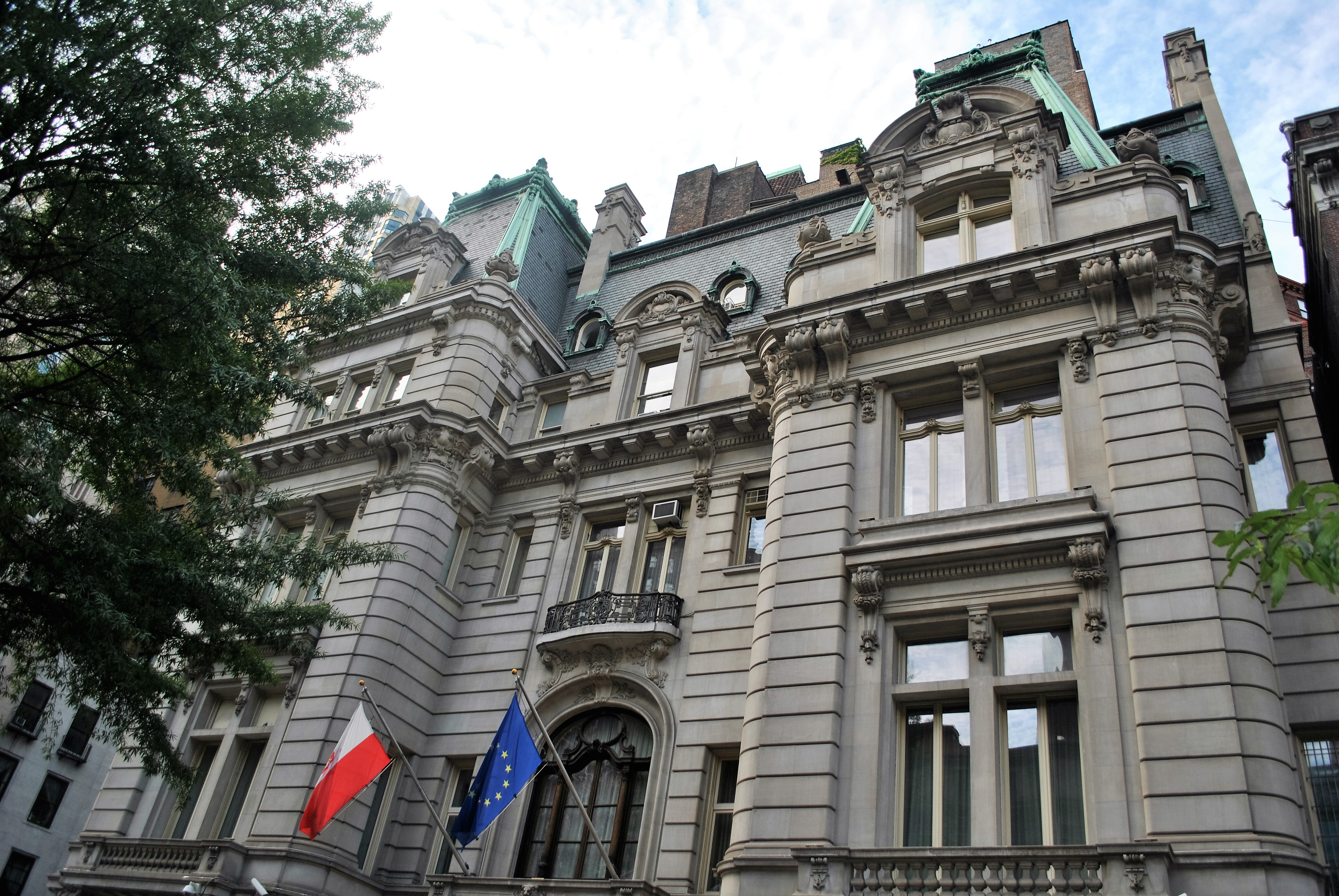
Consulate-General of Poland in New York City
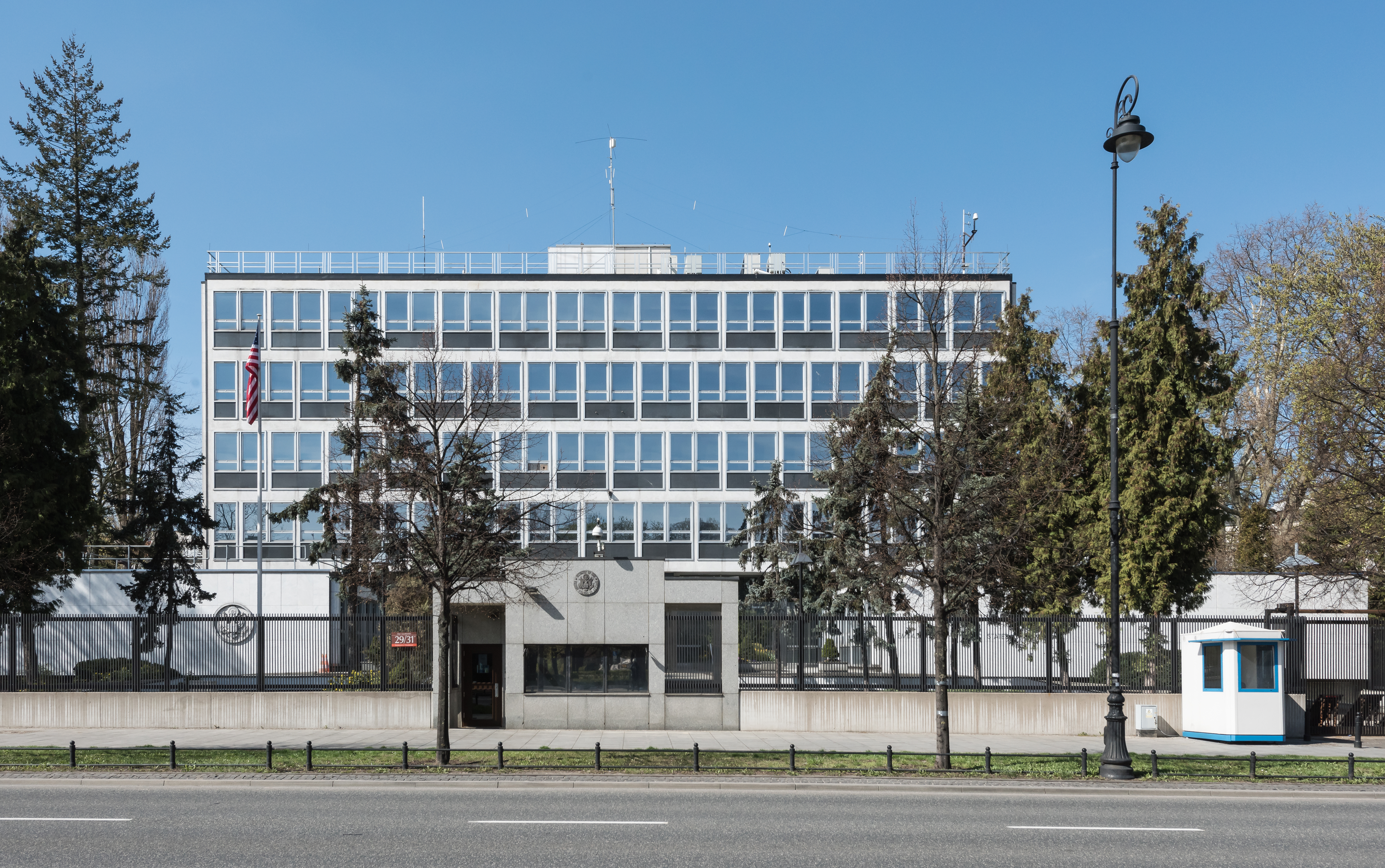
Embassy of the United States in Warsaw

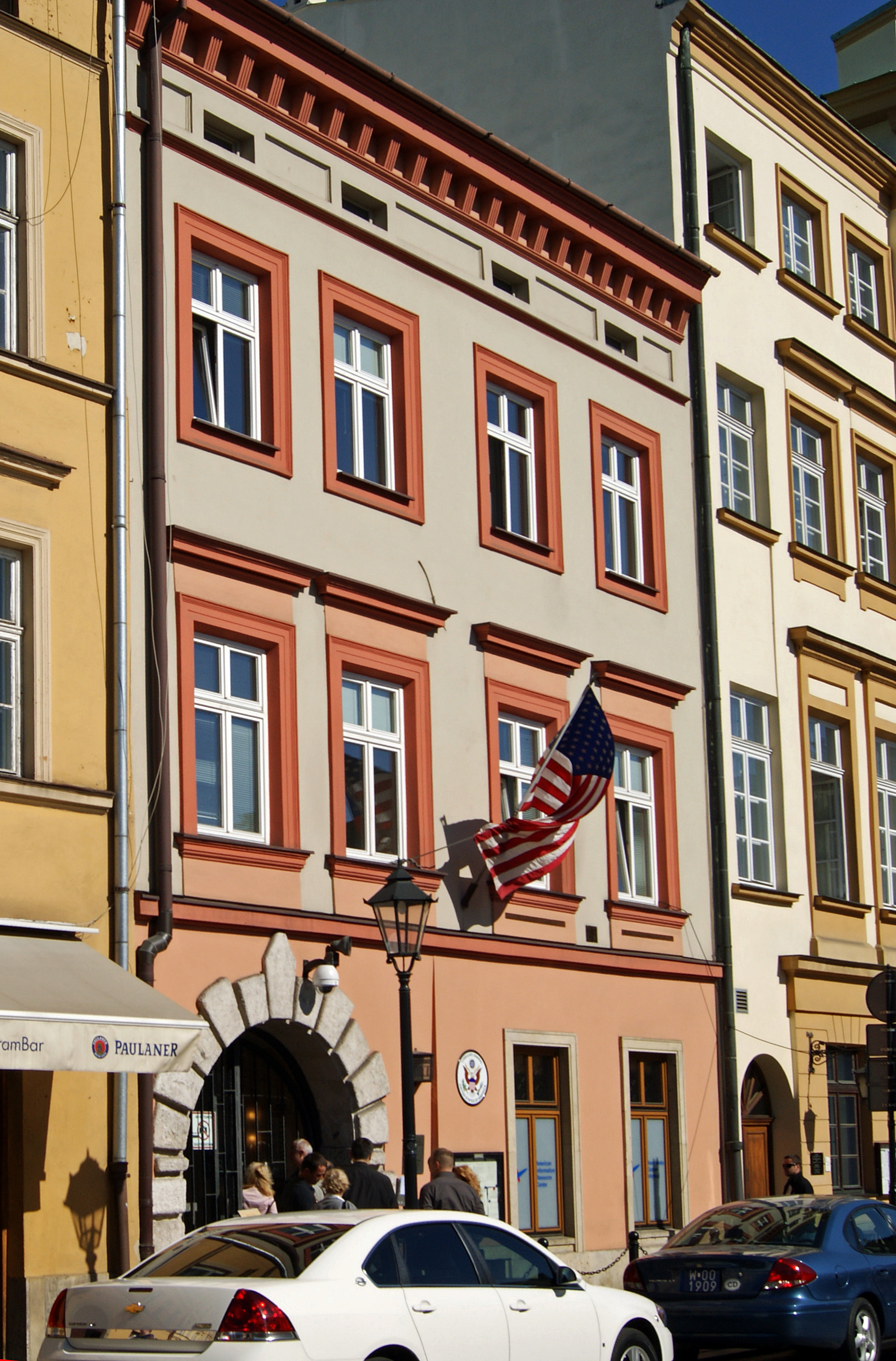
Consulate-General of the United States in Kraków

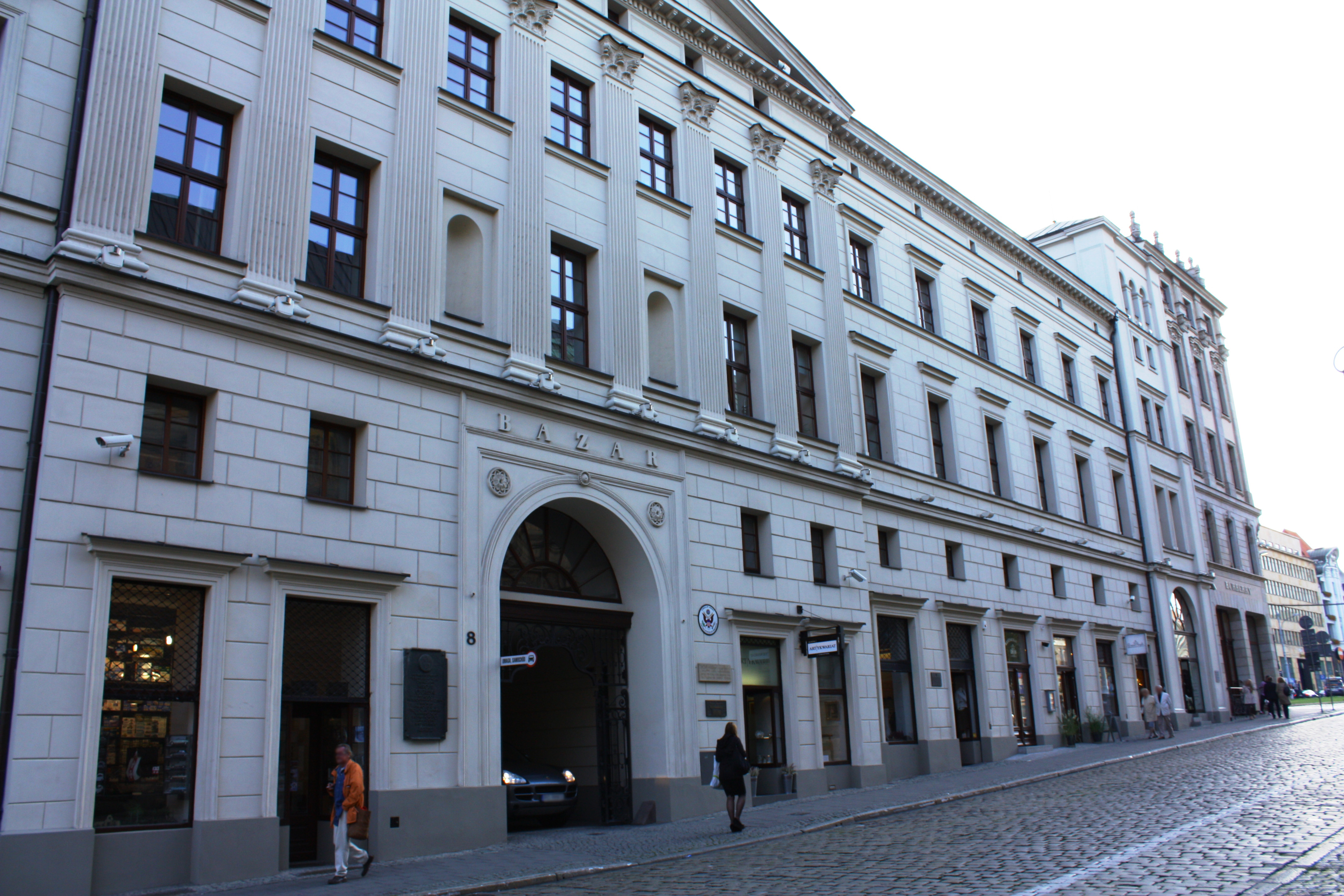
Consular Agency of the United States in Poznań

== See also ==
- List of ambassadors of the United States to Poland
- Polish Americans
- List of Polish-Americans
- Polish-American vote
- Polish American Historical Association
- Polish American Congress
- Casimir Pulaski Day
- US-EU relations
