= Paweł Zyzak =

Polish historian

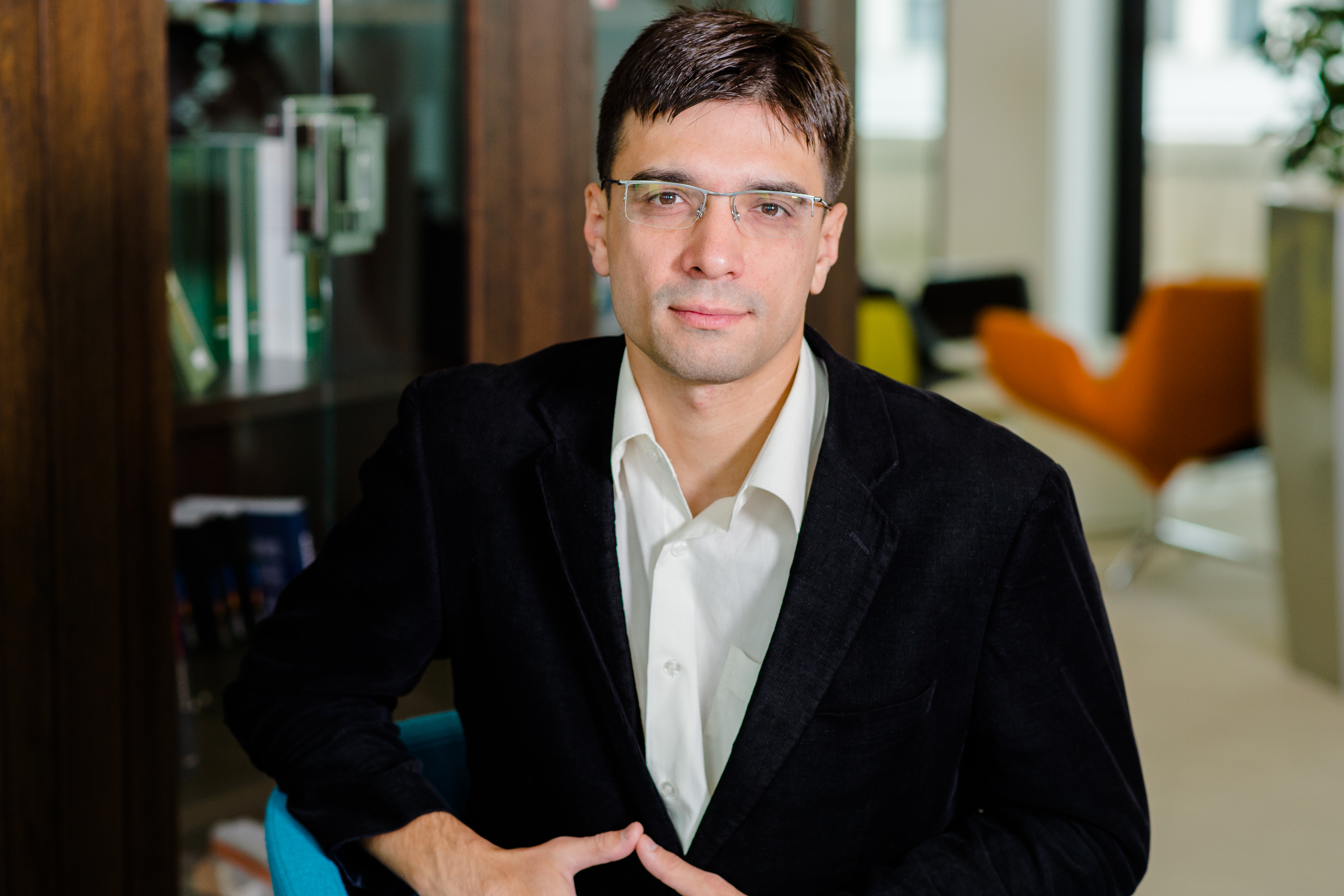
- Born: 1984 (age 41–42); Żywiec, Poland
- Education: Jagiellonian University
- Occupations: archival historian, publicist, Chief Expert at the Polish Investment and Trade Agency
- Title: Consul-General of Poland in Chicago
- Term: 6 September 2022 – June 2024
- Predecessor: Piotr Janicki
- Successor: Regina Jurkowska

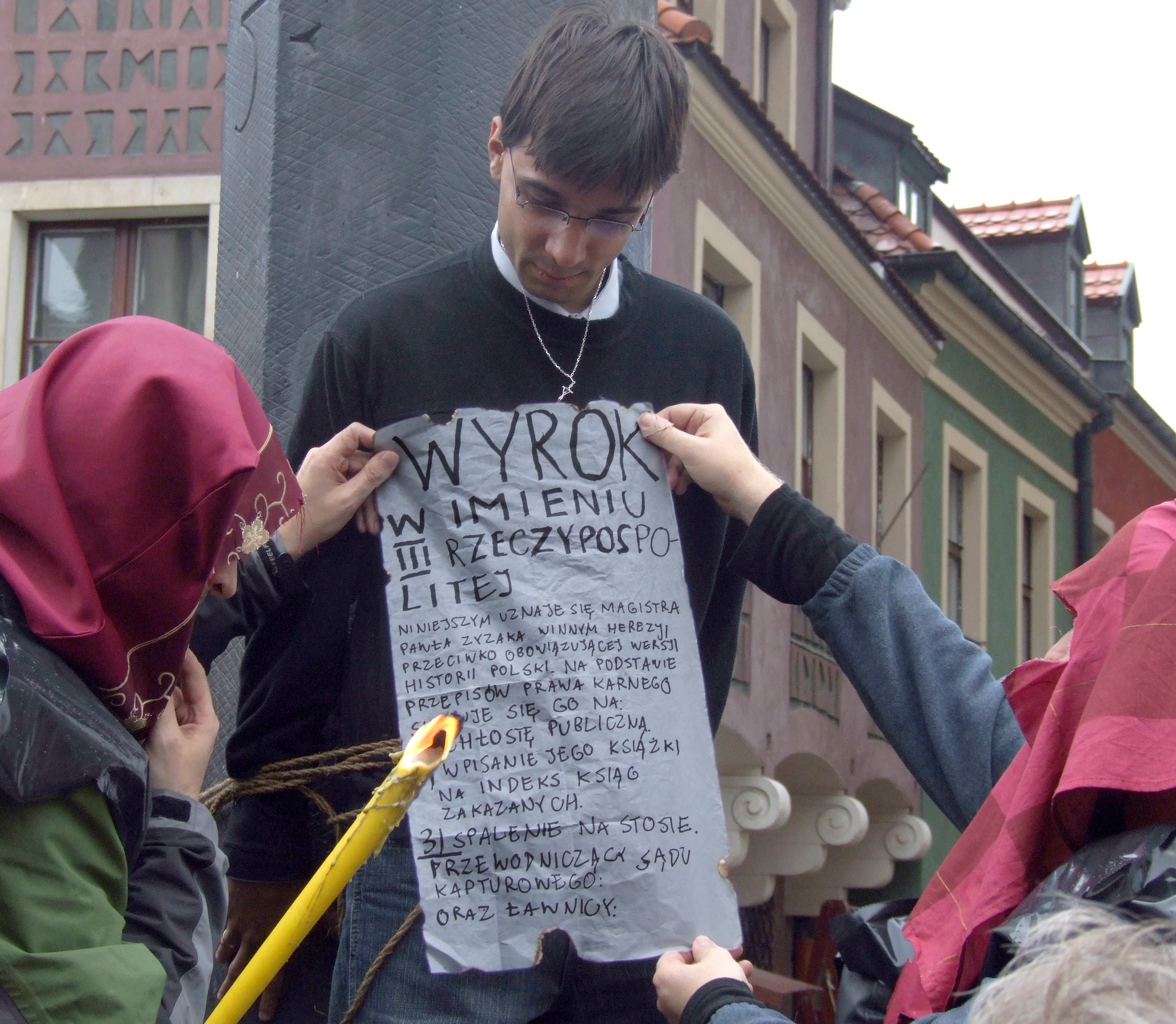
Paweł Zyzak as the hero of the happening festival, being sentenced on behalf of the 3rd Republic of Poland (2009)

Paweł Zyzak (born 1984) is a Polish historian, doctor of humanities, publicist and entrepreneur. He is the author of a biography of Lech Wałęsa entitled "Lech Wałęsa – idea i historia. Biografia polityczna legendarnego przywódcy „Solidarności" do 1988 roku" (Lech Wałęsa - idea and history. Biography of Solidarity's legendary political leader to 1988). Between 2022 and 2024 he was Consul-General of Poland in Chicago.

== Biography ==
Zyzak was born in 1984 in Żywiec. He graduated from Zespołu Szkół Elektronicznych, Elektrycznych i Mechanicznych im. J. Śniadeckiego w Bielsku-Białej with the title of electronic technician. He completed a degree in history with a specialization in archiving and pedagogy at the Jagiellonian University in 2008. In 2010 he undertook a four-month academic internship at the Institute of World Politics in Washington, D.C., receiving a recommendation from historian Marek Jan Chodakiewicz. Between 2013 and 2014 Zyzak studied at the University of Vienna and also interned at the Albert Shanker Institute in Washington, the Institute for Democracy in Eastern Europe, and the Polish & Slavic Federal Credit Union. He took part in the Harvard Project on Cold War Studies at Harvard University. He received his doctorate of humanities in 2015 from the Adam Mickiewicz University.

From October 2008 to April 2009 he worked as an archivist at the Institute of National Remembrance in Kraków.

He was active in the Republican League and the Law and Justice Youth Forum in Bielsko-Biała, of which he was chairman. During the 2006 Polish local elections, he unsuccessfully ran for a position on the city council of Bielsko-Biała from the third position on Law and Justice's party list, gaining 384 votes (3.74%). Subsequently, he left the party.

Zyzak has created and written for such periodicals as "Zakaz Skrętu w Lewo" (Turning left is prohibited) (which he founded), "W prawo zwrot!" (right turn, in the sense of military drill), and was an editor of the Law and Justice-associated publication "Zapis Śląski" (the Silesian record) until 2006.

Zyzak gained publicity for publishing a book about Lech Wałęsa entitled "Lech Wałęsa – idea i historia. Biografia polityczna legendarnego przywódcy "Solidarności" do 1988 roku" (Lech Wałęsa - idea and history. Biography of Solidarity's legendary political leader to 1988), which was based upon his master dissertation and was published in 2009 by Arcana. The book won him the 2010 Józef Mickiewicz Literary Award. That same year, he also became a laureate of the Jacek Maziarski Award.

Since 2009, he has published a personal blog on the website Niezalezna.pl. He currently also writes for such periodicals as the bi-monthly Arcana, Gazeta Polska, Niezależna Gazeta Polska, Nowe Państwo, and Niezależna Gazeta Polska - Nowe Państwo.

In 2013, on the 35th anniversary of the Żywiec bus catastrophe, he published a monograph entitled "Tajemnica Wilczego Jaru" (The secret of the Wolf Ravine) on the topic of this road accident.

Co-founder and, since 2014, president of the management board of the welfare co-operation "Strzelec".

Between 2013 and 2015 he took part in the "OWES Subregionu Południowego" project, within the framework of Priorytet VII – Promocja Integracji Społecznej, Działanie 7.2 Przeciwdziałanie wykluczeniu i wzmocnieniu sektora Ekonomii Społecznej. Projekt oferował szkolenia i doradztwo m.in. w zakresie podejmowania i prowadzenia działalności w ramach spółdzielni socjalnej, marketingu i technik sprzedaży, etc.

Vice-president of Innovation Centre FIRE. President of the Association "Republican Movement". Member of the Program Council of the Association of Creators for the Polish Commonwealth.

A permanent Polish correspondent for Radio Chicago and an expert on US affairs. He is also a permanent columnist for Kurier Chicago and the Canadian Goniec. Head editor of the online portal History and Diplomacy.

Currently, Zyzak also serves as Chief Expert at the Polish Investment and Trade Agency. In September 2017 he took part in the Transatlantic Fellows Program in Washington, D.C., organized by the World Affairs Journal.

On 6 September 2022, Zyzak started his service as Polish Consul-General in Chicago. He has since taken the position First Dean of the Chicago Consular Corps. He ended his mission in Chicago in June 2024.

== Publications ==
- Lech Wałęsa – idea i historia. Biografia polityczna legendarnego przywódcy „Solidarności" do 1988 roku (Arcana, Warsaw2009) ISBN 978-83-609-40-72-3.
- Gorszy niż faszysta (Zysk I S-Ka, Warsaw 2011) ISBN 978-83-7506-916-7.
- Tajemnica Wilczego Jaru. Największa drogowa katastrofa PRL w świetle dokumentów i relacji (Zysk i S-ka, Poznań 2013) ISBN 978-83-7785-200-2.
- Wielka księga patriotów polskich, Kraków 2013 (biogramy: Jakub Karpiński oraz Walerian Łukasiński)
- Zanim nastąpi przełom, red. W. Tyrański, Warsaw 2014 (co-author)
- Efekt domina. Czy Ameryka obaliła komunizm w Polsce? (2 tomes, Fronda PL 2016) ISBN 978-83-8079-104-6.
- Instytut Pamięci Narodowej. Stworzyć polskie Jad Waszem (Myśl Suwerenna. Przegląd Spraw Publicznych).
- Amerykański sen. Gwałtowne przebudzenie. Ameryka 2014-2021. Era wojen hybrydowych, pandemii i Trumpa (Wydawnictwo Fronda)
- Rządowy ośrodek analityczno-strategiczny ds. międzynarodowych. Centrum układu nerwowego nowoczesnego państwa (Myśl Suwerenna, Białystok 2022).
