= Embassy of Poland, Washington, D.C. =

Diplomatic mission of the Republic of Poland to the United States of America

Embassy of the Republic of Poland in Washington
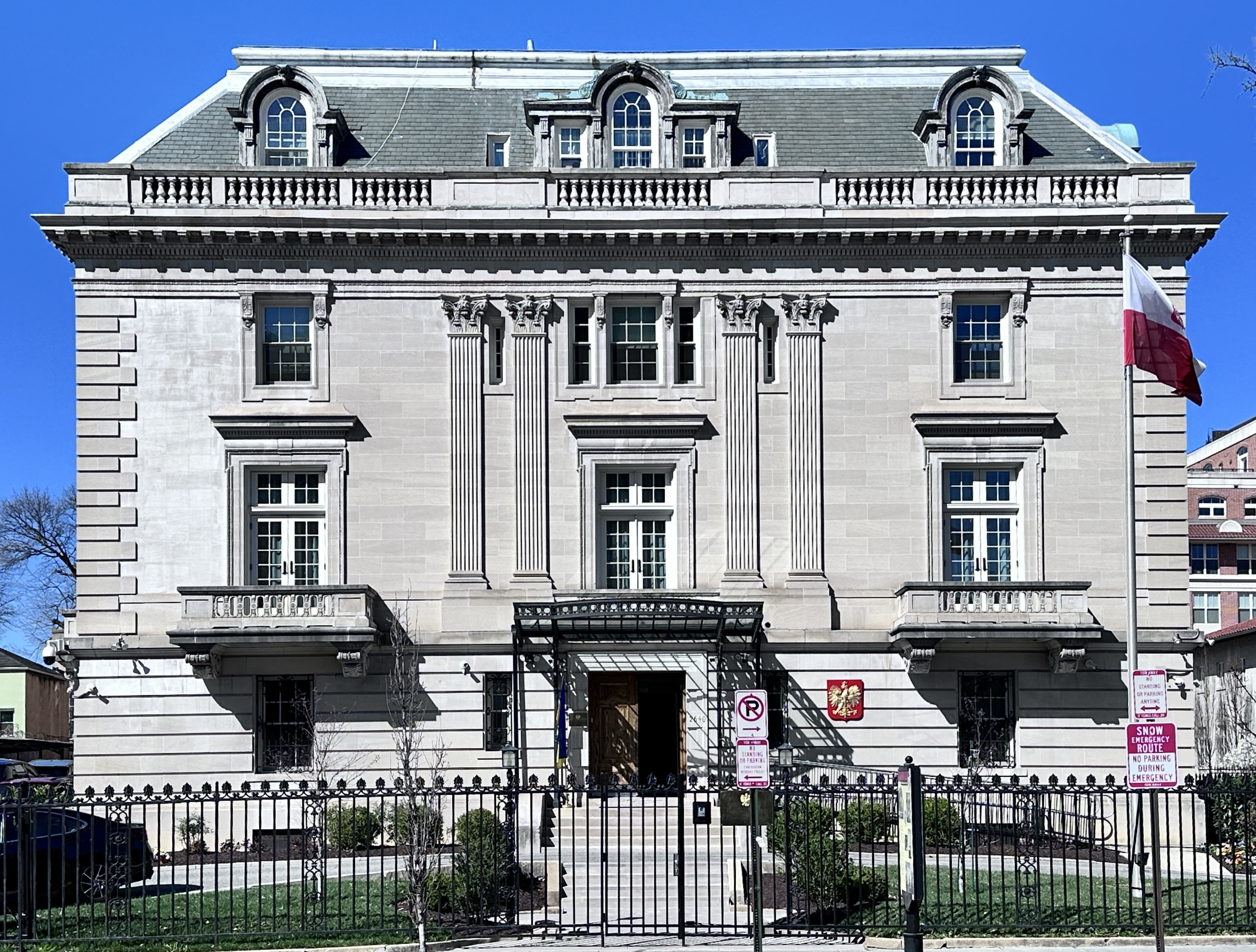
- The chancery of the Polish Embassy in Washington, D.C., photographed in 2025
- Location: Washington, D.C., United States
- Address: 2640 16th Street, N.W.
- Coordinates: 38°55′28″N 77°2′13″W
- Chargé d'affaires: Bogdan Klich
- Website: gov.pl/usa-en/embassy-washington

The Embassy of the Republic of Poland in Washington, D.C. (Polish: Ambasada Rzeczypospolitej Polskiej w Waszyngtonie) is the diplomatic mission of the Republic of Poland to the United States of America. The chancery is located at 2640 16th Street NW, Washington, D.C., in the Meridian Hill neighborhood.

== Main chancery building ==
The Polish Embassy in Washington, D.C. was designed by the architect George Oakley Totten and was originally intended to be the city home of U.S. Senator John B. Henderson. Completed early in 1910, the building was finished in a style reminiscent of seventeenth and eighteenth century French mansionettes, however, it also incorporates major elements of English styling, such as the use of double-hung windows, limestone balconies and the addition of an elaborate iron and glass marquee over the front.

The building was purchased on behalf of the government of the newly independent Polish nation in 1919 by the country's first ambassador to the United States, Prince Kazimierz Lubomirski. Since then, very few changes have been made and the building thus retains many of its outstanding period features. In 1978 a team of specialists was brought from Poland to repair and renovate the ornate plaster and woodwork of the embassy's state rooms, returning the interior to its former grandeur and restoring its artistic integrity.

In the embassy's main 'salon' stands a large Steinway piano which is still frequently used to entertain guests at many of the embassy's events throughout the year. The instrument not only evokes memories of music played on it by outstanding musicians over the years, but, as a gift to the embassy during World War II from Ignacy Jan Paderewski, is also in itself a symbol of Polish patriotism. Paderewski played it during his last American tour, when he fell ill and had to cancel his concerts. He died soon after in 1941 and was buried in Arlington National Cemetery with the request that his body be returned to Poland 'only when his country is independent once more'. This request was finally carried out in 1992, when he was exhumed from his grave in Arlington and reinterred in Warsaw's Powązki Cemetery.

Throughout the embassy there is a large and varied array of both portraits and landscapes by a number of Polish artists of different eras. Amongst these is an original oil-on-canvas portrait by Josef Grassi of Polish national hero Tadeusz Kościuszko, a Pole who after meeting with Benjamin Franklin in Paris proceeded to the United States to fight in the Revolutionary War and who ultimately went on to design the fortifications at West Point. Kościuszko then returned to Poland and devoted his life to achieving Polish freedom. It is to this end that he led the Kościuszko Uprising, which aimed to liberate Poland from the partitioning powers of Prussia, Austria and the Russian Empire.

== New Embassy Building ==
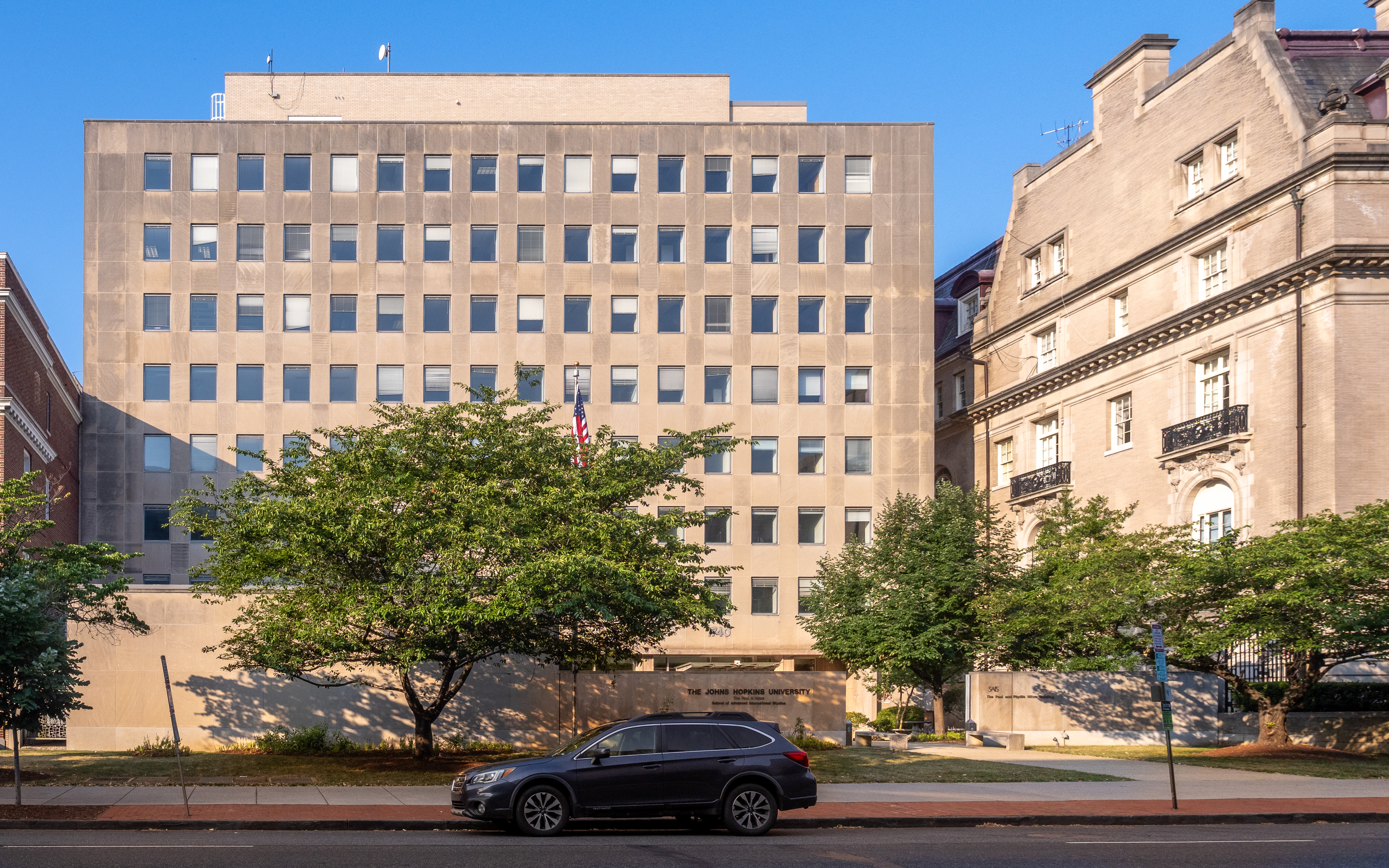
Building where the new Polish Embassy in Washington, D.C. will be located at.

In December 2024, the Polish Foreign Ministry announced the purchase of a new location for the Polish Embassy in Washington, D.C. as the current building no longer meets modern diplomatic requirements. The new building, located at 1740 Massachusetts Ave NW, previously belonged to Johns Hopkins University. The Polish Foreign Ministry will invest heavily to renovate the new embassy building which may take 4 years to complete. The purchase and relocation of the embassy is the Polish Foreign Ministry's second high-profile real estate project, following its embassy in Berlin.

== Ambassador's residence ==
On Whitehaven St NW (2026)

The Polish ambassador's residence in Washington, D.C., is currently located in the fashionable Embassy Row area of Washington, on Whitehaven Street, an address also shared by the diplomatic missions of Italy and Denmark. Adjacent to the British Embassy and near to the Washington home of former U.S. Secretary of State Hillary Clinton, the house is considered one of the finest ambassadorial residences in the city.

Bought by the Polish government in 2008 as part of a Polish Foreign Office policy to purchase "buildings befitting diplomacy", for a reported price of $9.55 million, the embassy is currently the home of Polish ambassador to the United States. The house, built in 1927, was formerly the Washington residence of the late billionaire philanthropist, art collector, and horse breeder Paul Mellon and his widow, Listerine heiress, Rachel ("Bunny") Mellon.

The house itself is of the a style reminiscent of 18th century French houses. The residence features a small stone portico, a relatively large garden, private driveway accessed through large wrought iron gates from Whitehaven Street, and a modest conservatory and swimming pool to the rear. Additionally the Polish flag now flies in front of the property.

The house is used primarily as the Washington residence of the incumbent ambassador and his family. It also provides an intimate and comfortable location for entertaining the embassy's many official guests as well as conducting embassy garden parties on state holidays and at various points throughout the year.

== Other sections ==
There are other departments of the Polish embassy which are located in buildings other than the chancery. The economic section of the embassy, which deals with trade and business interests between Poland and the United States, is located at 1503 21st Street NW.

The consular section of the embassy, which deals with visa and passport matters to both Polish citizens and foreign nationals wishing to visit or emigrate to Poland, is located at 2224 Wyoming Avenue NW.

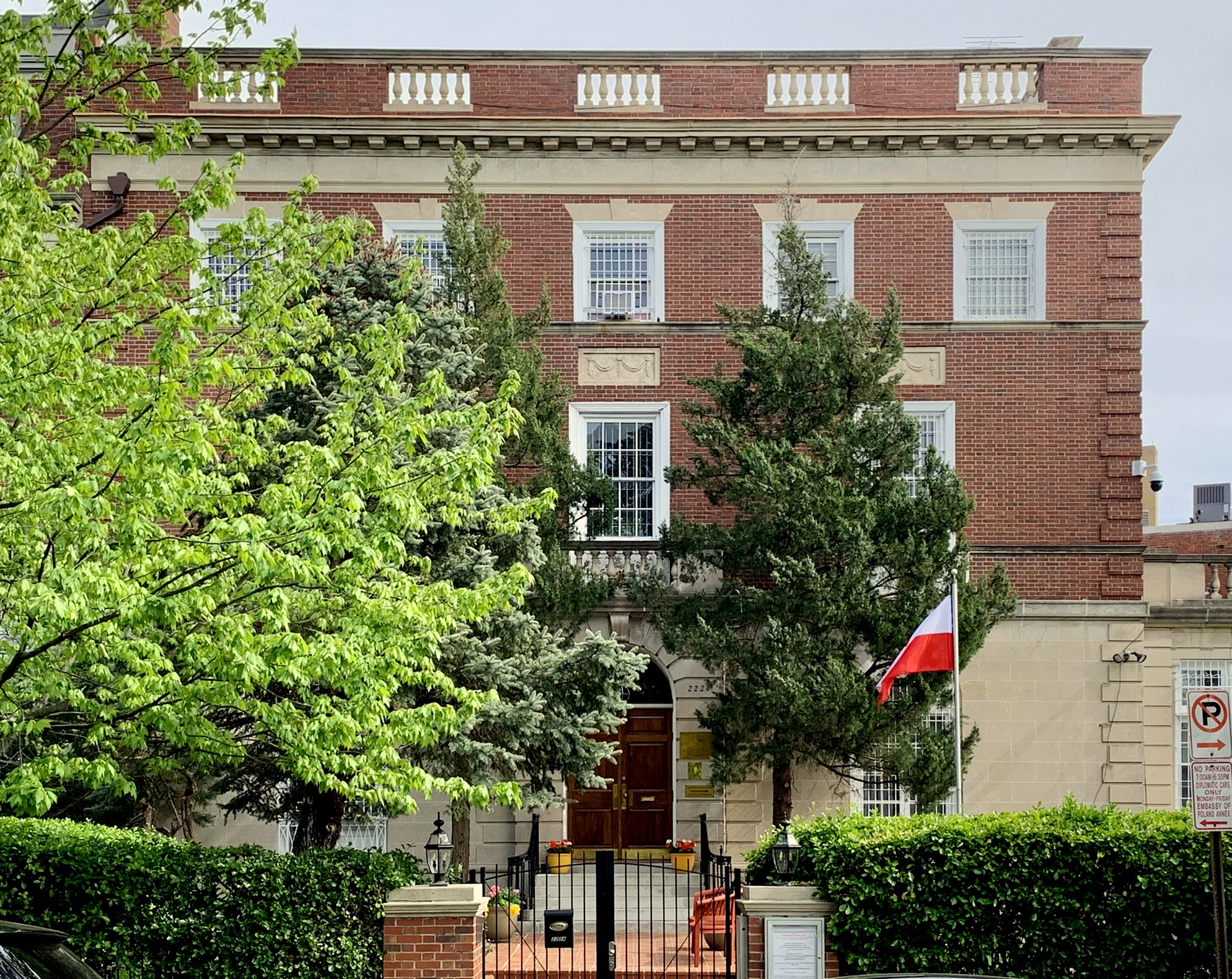
Consular section located at 2224 Wyoming Avenue NW.

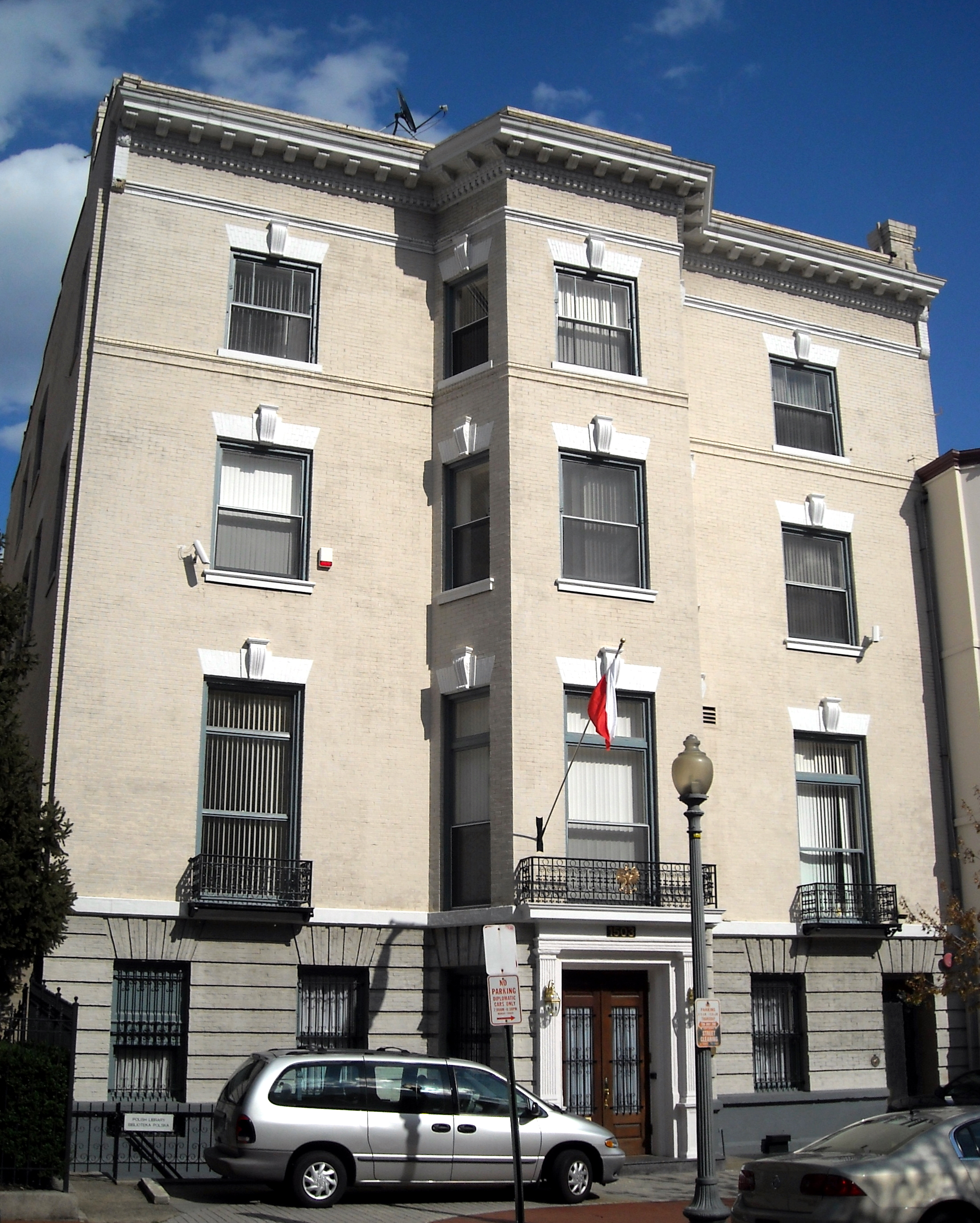
Economic section located at 1503 21st Street NW.

== See also ==
- List of ambassadors of Poland to the United States
- List of diplomatic missions of Poland
- Foreign relations of Poland
- Poland–United States relations
- Polish nationality law
- Embassy of the United States, Warsaw
