= Embassy of the United States, Warsaw =

Situated on Ujazdów Avenue in Warsaw, Poland

U.S. Embassy in Warsaw
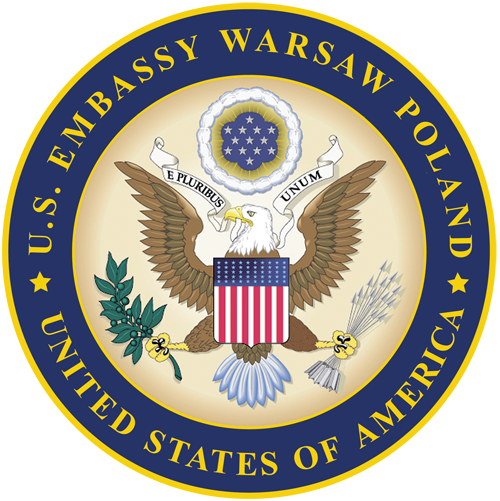
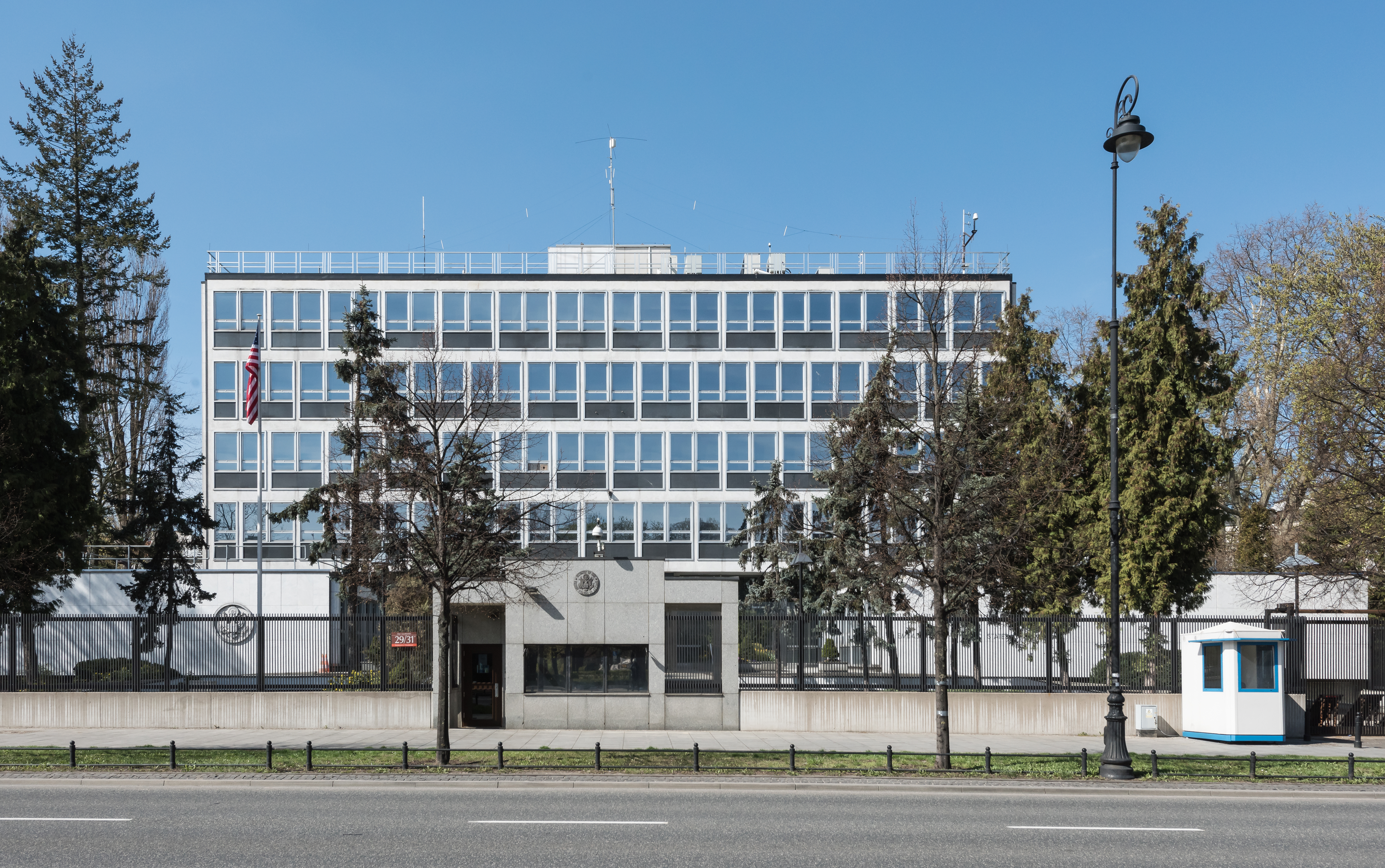
- Location: Warsaw, Poland
- Address: Al. Ujazdowskie 29-31, 00-540 Warsaw, Poland
- Coordinates: 52°13′29″N 21°1′26″E
- Opened: 1871, re-established in 1919 and 1945
- Website: https://pl.usembassy.gov

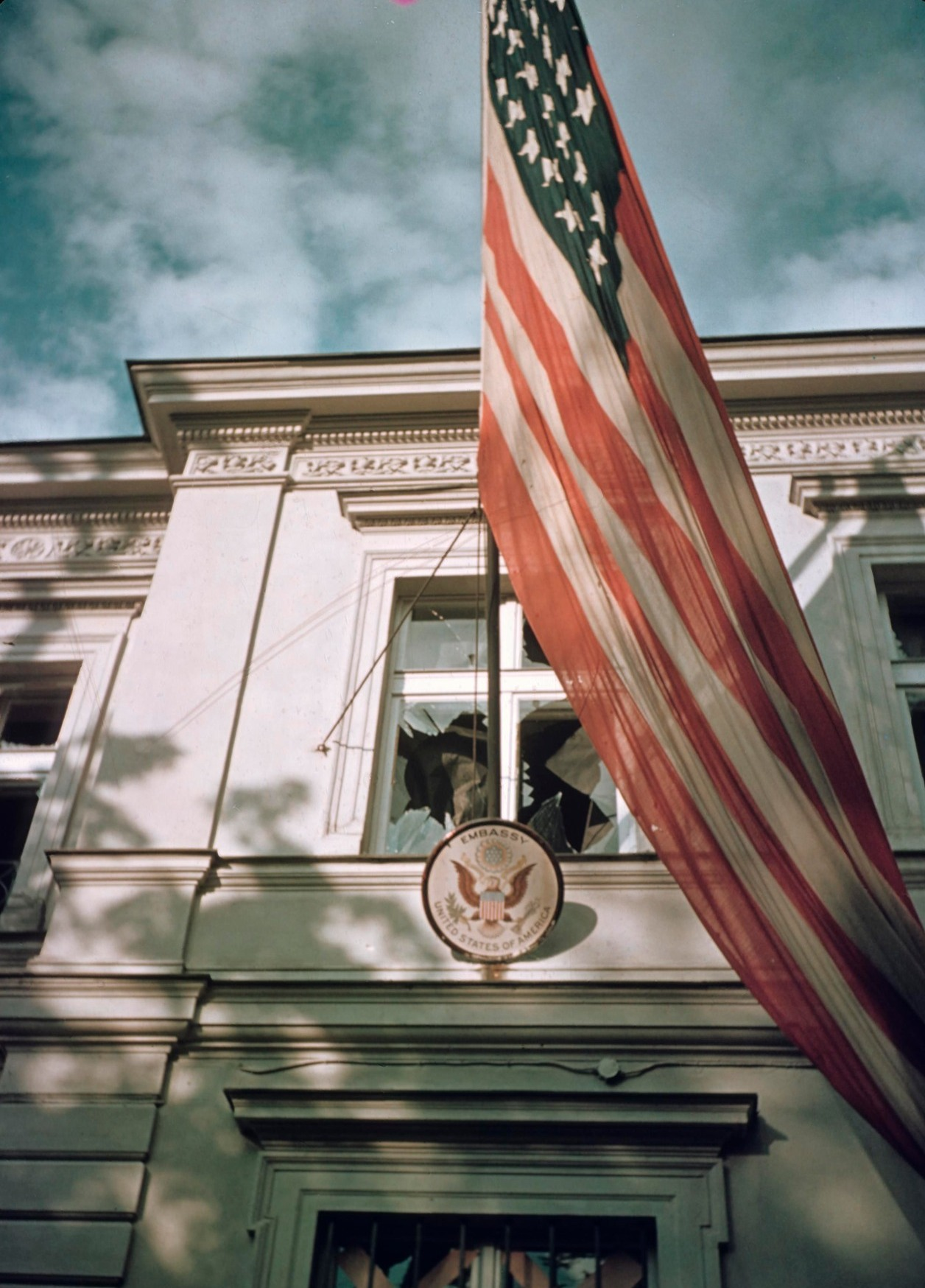
American embassy in Warsaw, Poland during the Nazi German air raid in 1939

The United States Embassy in Poland (Polish: Ambasada Stanów Zjednoczonych w Polsce) is situated on Ujazdów Avenue in Warsaw, Poland. The United States also maintains a consulate in Kraków.

== History ==
Diplomatic relations between the United States and Poland were established on May 2, 1919, when the first U.S. Minister to Poland, Hugh S. Gibson, presented his credentials. On January 31, 1930, Alexander P. Moore was appointed the first U.S. Ambassador to Poland, but he died before taking office. John N. Willys succeeded him, presenting his credentials on May 24, 1930, and serving until May 30, 1932.

With the outbreak of World War II on September 1, 1939, following the invasion of Poland by Nazi Germany, the U.S. Ambassador to Poland, Anthony J. Drexel Biddle Jr., left Warsaw and followed the Government of Poland to France, and later to London as the war progressed. After the end of World War II, the U.S. Embassy was re-established in Warsaw on July 31, 1945. Ambassador Arthur Bliss Lane, appointed on September 21, 1944, presented his credentials on August 4, 1945, and his tenure continued until February 24, 1947.

== Consulate ==
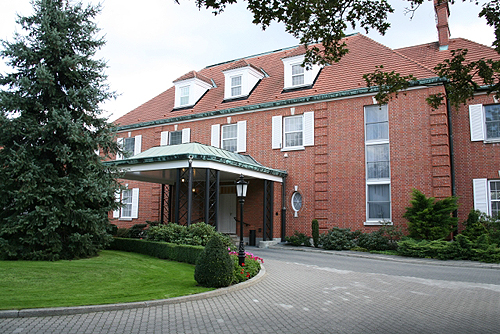
U.S. Ambassador's Residence in Mokotów, Warsaw

The consulate in Warsaw operated from 1875 on.

List of United States Consuls General in Warsaw
Name	Official residence	Appointment	Termination
Josew Rawicz	Warsaw	1875	1901
Boleslaw Horodynski	Warsaw	1901	1902
Hernando de Soto		1902	1904
Clarence R. Slocum		1903	1905
Albert Leffinwell		1905	1906
Thomas E. Heenan	Odessa	1906	1910
Henando de Soto	Warsaw	1910	1914

== See also ==
- Embassy of Poland, Washington, D.C.
- List of ambassadors of the United States to Poland
- Poland–United States relations

== Bibliography ==
- Saul, Norman E. (1996). "Appendix D: Secretaries of Legation and Consuls in Russia". Concord and Conflict: The United States and Russia, 1867–1914. Lawrence: University Press of Kansas. pp. 597–600. ISBN 9780700607549.
