= Consulate General of Poland, Chicago =

Konsulat Generalny Rzeczypospolitej Polskiej w Chicago Consulate General of the Republic of Poland in Chicago

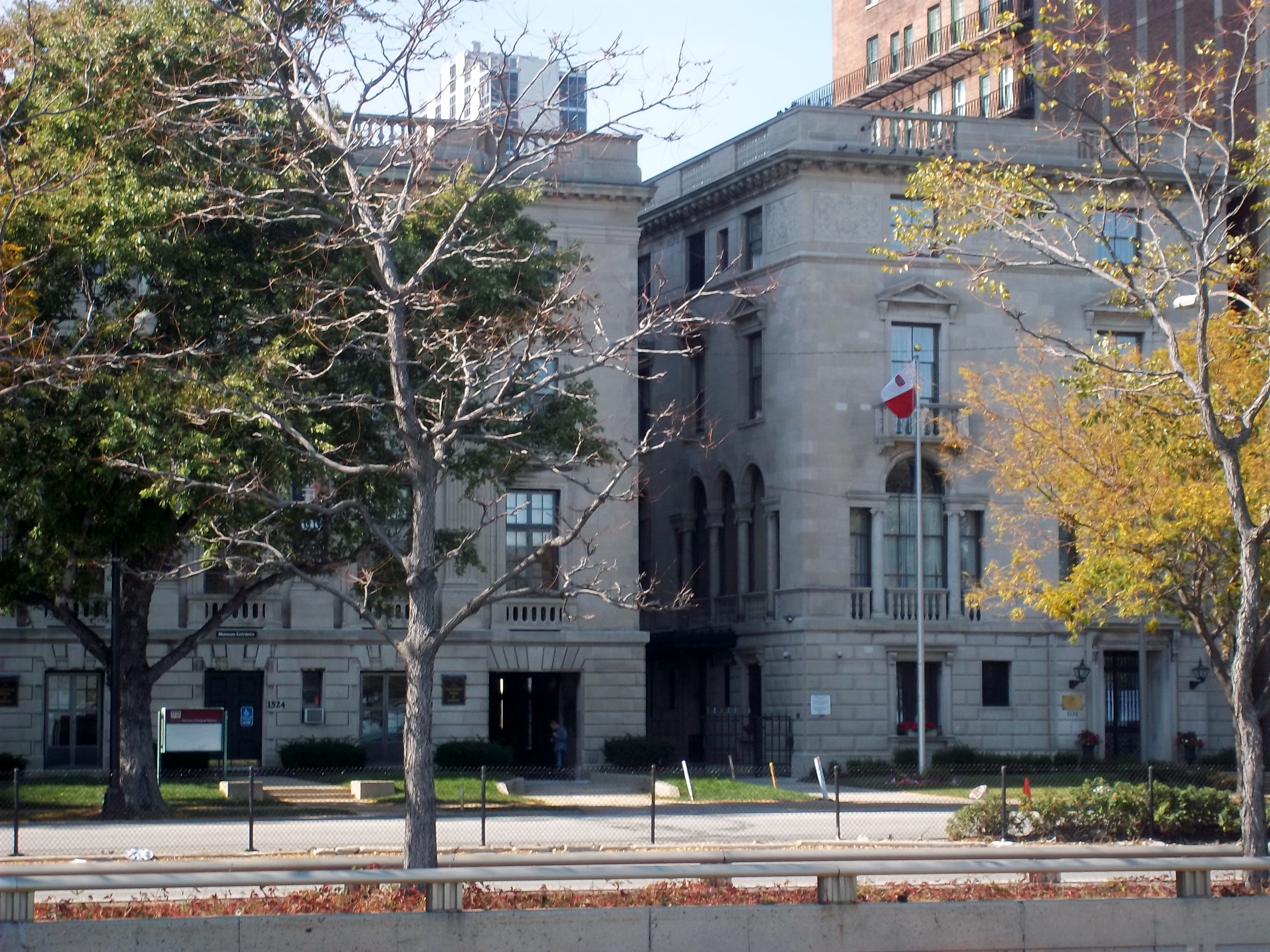
- Location: Lake Shore Drive, Chicago, United States
- Address: 1530 N. Lake Shore Drive, Chicago, Illinois 60610
- Coordinates: 41.9105°N 87.6266°W
- Consul General: Bernadetta Pałka-Maciejewska (acting)

The Consulate General of the Republic of Poland in Chicago (Polish: Konsulat Generalny Rzeczypospolitej Polskiej w Chicago) is a consular mission of the Republic of Poland in the United States. The mission serves the largest Polish communities outside of Poland.

The consulate is located at 1530 North Lake Shore Drive in the Gold Coast area of the Near North Side region of Chicago, Illinois.

== History ==
Soon after the establishment of the Second Polish Republic, a consulate was opened in Chicago on June 1, 1920, with Zygmunt Nowicki being the first consul. After the United States recognized the Provisional Government of National Unity (later becoming the communist Polish People's Republic) over the Polish government-in-exile in 1945, the previous representatives refused to hand over the premises of their missions, resulting in it taking several months before all consulates, including the one in Chicago, were taken by PPR diplomats. The US Department of State asked that the consulate be closed down in 1954; it took until October 1958 for an agreement to be made to restore it, with the consulate finally reopening in October 1959. The consulate had jurisdiction over 28 states from that point until the opening of a consulate in Los Angeles, which took jurisdiction over 15 western states previously managed there. Through the 1980s, the Polish American Congress held demonstrations outside the consulate, among other measures, to signal their support for the Solidarity movement and protest the imposition of martial law in Poland. This led to the square outside the consulate being dubbed "Solidarity Square".

The building that currently houses the consulate opened in 1916 as a private residence named Eckhart Mansion, designed by the firm Marshall and Fox. The Polish government bought the house in 1974. The house became a Gold Coast historical monument in 1989.

== See also ==
- Poland – United States relations
- List of diplomatic missions of Poland
- Foreign relations of Poland
- Polish nationality law
