= Janusz Lewandowski (diplomat) =

Polish diplomat (1931–2013)

Commissioner of the International Control Commission for Vietnam
- In office 1966 – 1967 serving with M. A. Rahman and Victor Campbell Moore/Ormond Dier
- Preceded by: Mieczysław Maneli
- Succeeded by: Ludwik Klockowski

Personal details
- Born: 10 March 1931 Warsaw, Second Polish Republic
- Died: 13 August 2013 (aged 82)
- Education: Taras Shevchenko University

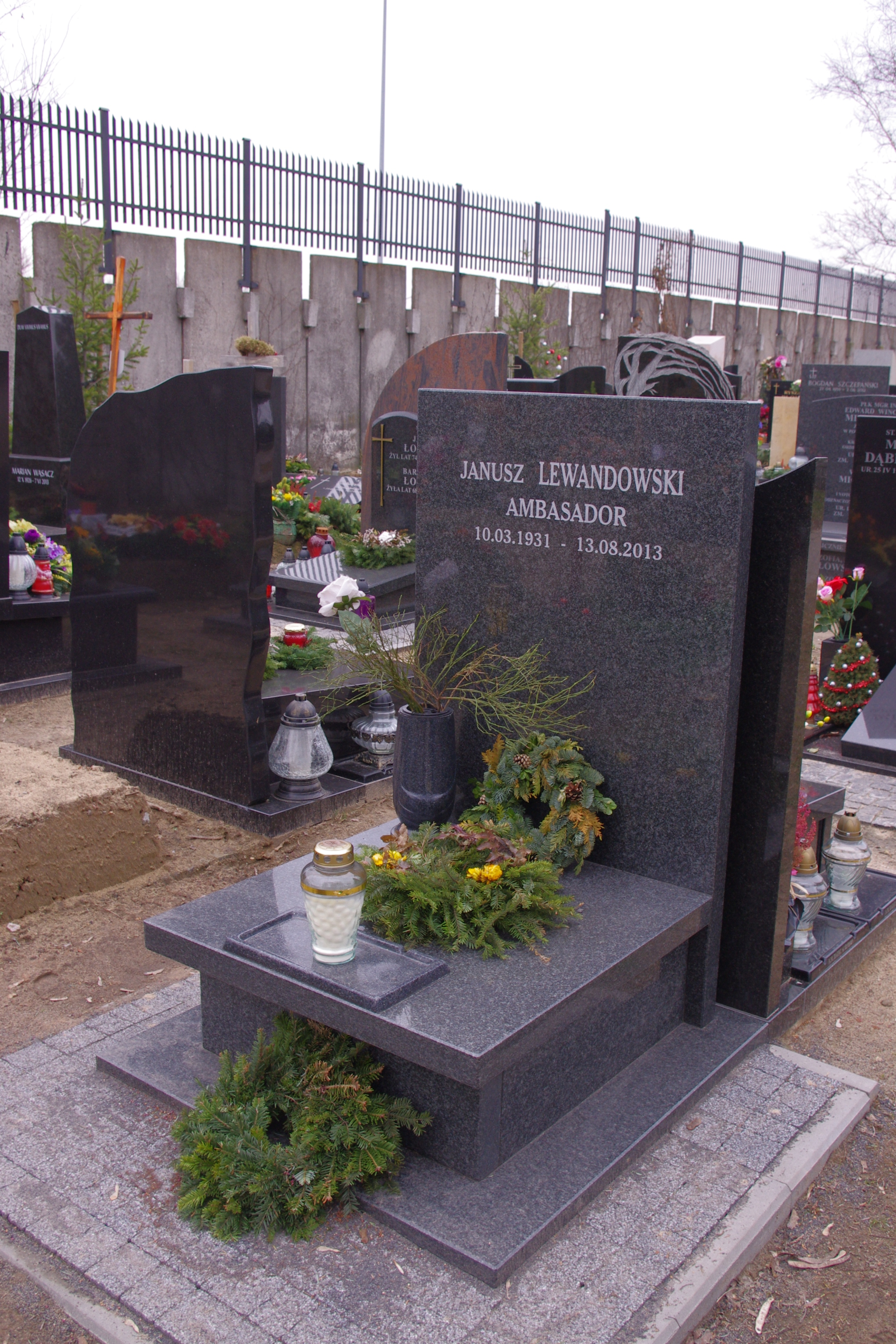
Lewandowski's grave

Janusz Lewandowski (10 March 1931 – 13 August 2013) was a Polish People’s Republic diplomat, known for arranging the Operation Marigold, a failed secret attempt to reach a compromise solution to the Vietnam War.

In 1955 he graduated from Taras Shevchenko National University of Kyiv, then Ukrainian SSR and afterwards held various positions at the Polish foreign ministry.

At the time when he started arranging the Vietnam talks, officially he was a representative at the International Control Commission set up to monitor the ceasefire in the divided Vietnam.

Later he served as an ambassador to a number of countries and retired in 1991.

Lewandowski died of cancer in 2013 and was interred at the Powązki Military Cemetery.

== Awards ==
- Order of Polonia Restituta, Knight's Cross, Poland
- Order of Polonia Restituta, Officer's Cross, Poland
- Order of Prince Henry, Portugal
- Order of Sukhbaatar, Mongolian People's Republic
