= J. Blair Seaborn =

Canadian diplomat and civil servant (1924–2019)

J. Blair Seaborn CM

Commissioner of the International Control Commission for Vietnam
- In office 1964 – 1965; Serving with Ramchundur Goburdhun and Mieczysław Maneli
- Preceded by: Gordon Cox
- Succeeded by: Victor Campbell Moore

Personal details
- Born: James Blair Seaborn; March 18, 1924 Toronto, Ontario, Canada
- Died: November 11, 2019 (aged 95) Ottawa, Ontario, Canada
- Education: Trinity College, Toronto
- Occupation: Diplomat and civil servant

Military service
- Allegiance: Canada
- Branch/service: Canadian Army
- Years of service: 1943–1946
- Unit: Royal Regiment of Canadian Artillery
- Battles/wars: World War II; Liberation of the Netherlands

James Blair Seaborn CM (March 18, 1924 – November 11, 2019) was a Canadian diplomat and civil servant best remembered for the Seaborn Mission of 1964–1965 in connection with the Vietnam War and for heading the "Seaborn Panel" of the 1990s that examined the subject of how to dispose of nuclear waste in Canada. Seaborn would ultimately become the best-known of all of Canada's ICC representatives, but the Canadian historian Victor Levant noted that "he did not gain this notoriety until long after his tour of duty." The Seaborn Mission is a controversial subject with opinions sharply divided to its purpose and morality.

== Early life and career ==
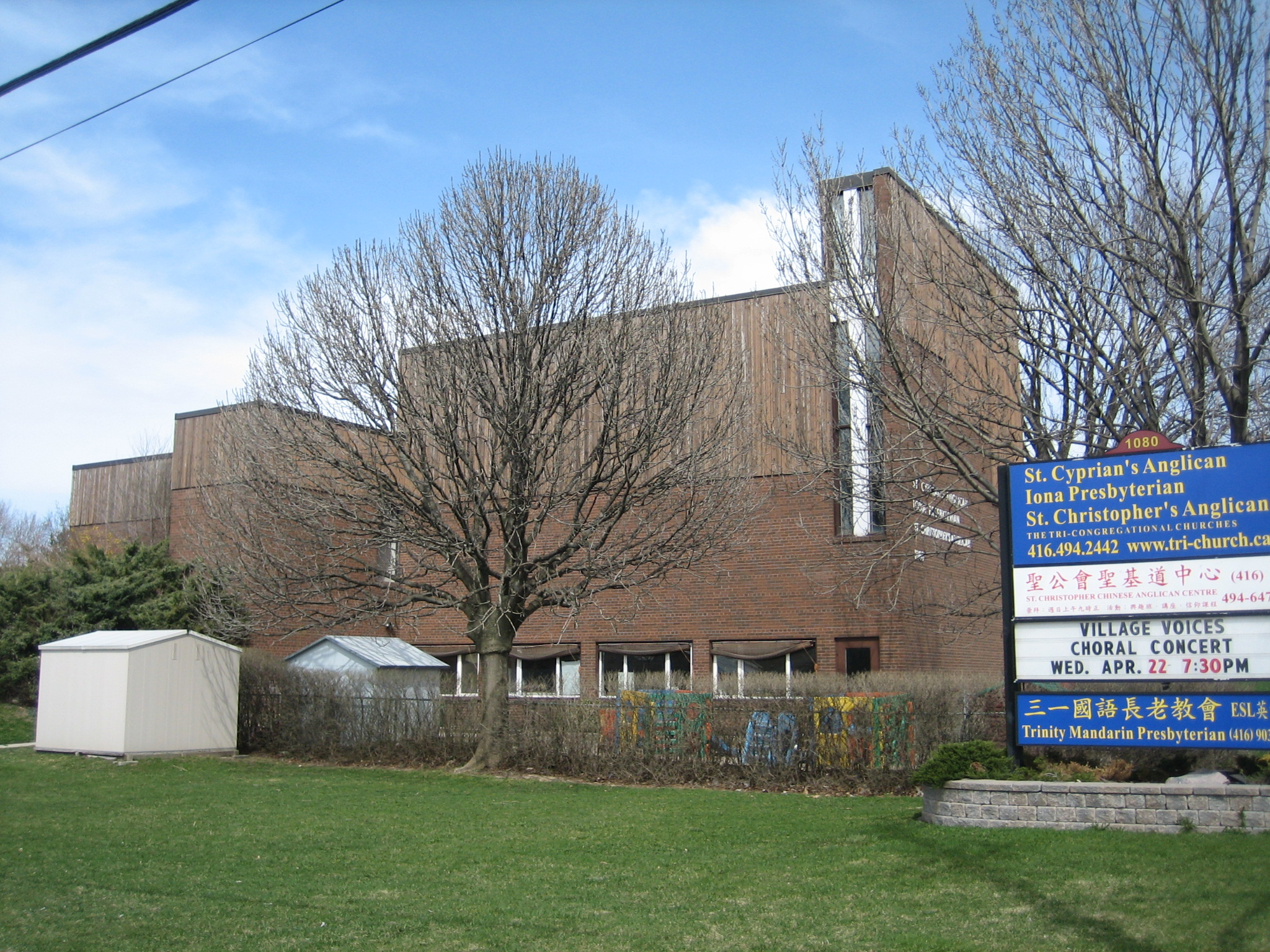
St Cyprian's Anglican Church, Toronto, 2009. Seaborn's father was the rector at St. Cyprian's in the 1920s.

Seaborn was born in Toronto, Ontario, the son of Reverend Richard Seaborn and Muriel Seaborn. His father was the rector at St. Cyprian's Anglican Church, and he had eight siblings. When he was six, his father died and his mother raised him on a clergyman's pension. An outstanding student, he was awarded the Dirkson Scholarship, which allowed him to attend university despite his family's poverty. After graduating from the University of Toronto Schools, he entered Trinity College at the University of Toronto in 1941, but he left his studies in 1943, when he joined the Canadian Army. Seaborn called his military service his "Khaki holiday" as he served in the Royal Canadian Artillery. After training in Canada and Britain, Seaborn's regiment took part in the liberation of the Netherlands in the spring of 1945.

After serving in the Canadian Army, he demobilised in 1946. He was awarded an MA in Political Science and History at the Trinity College at the University of Toronto in 1948. After graduation, Seaborn entered the Department of External Affairs in 1948 and served as a diplomat in The Hague, Paris, Moscow, and Saigon. Traditionally, the Canadian diplomatic corps was small, as the British Foreign Office represented Canada abroad, and Canada maintaining only high commissions in London and the other Commonwealth capitals and embassies in Washington, Paris, and Moscow. Successive Canadian prime ministers were content to have British diplomats represent Canada as a costsaving measure. After Prime Minister William Lyon Mackenzie King, who favoured a quasi-isolationist foreign policy, retired in 1948, his successor, Louis St. Laurent, was prepared to spend far more money than King ever had done on expanding the Department of External Affairs.

The years after 1948 were years of rapid growth for the Canadian diplomatic corps, as St. Laurent's External Affairs Minister, Lester Pearson, had a very ambitious vision of Canadians playing a greater role in the world. The diplomatic corps became an elitist group, as one diplomat asserted: "It is the combination of remarkable men with appropriate national backgrounds and opportune circumstances that has made for effective middle powermanship." Precisely because Canada was not a great power, the diplomatic corps needed especially-effective diplomats to promote Canadian interests abroad, which caused an emphasis on elitism. For that reason, Canadian diplomats were often called the "mandarins." Seaborn excelled in the growing diplomatic corps and served as the Third Secretary at the embassy in The Hague, First Secretary at the embassy in Paris, and counselor at the embassy in Moscow. In 1950, he married Carol Trow and had two children: Geoffrey and Virginia.

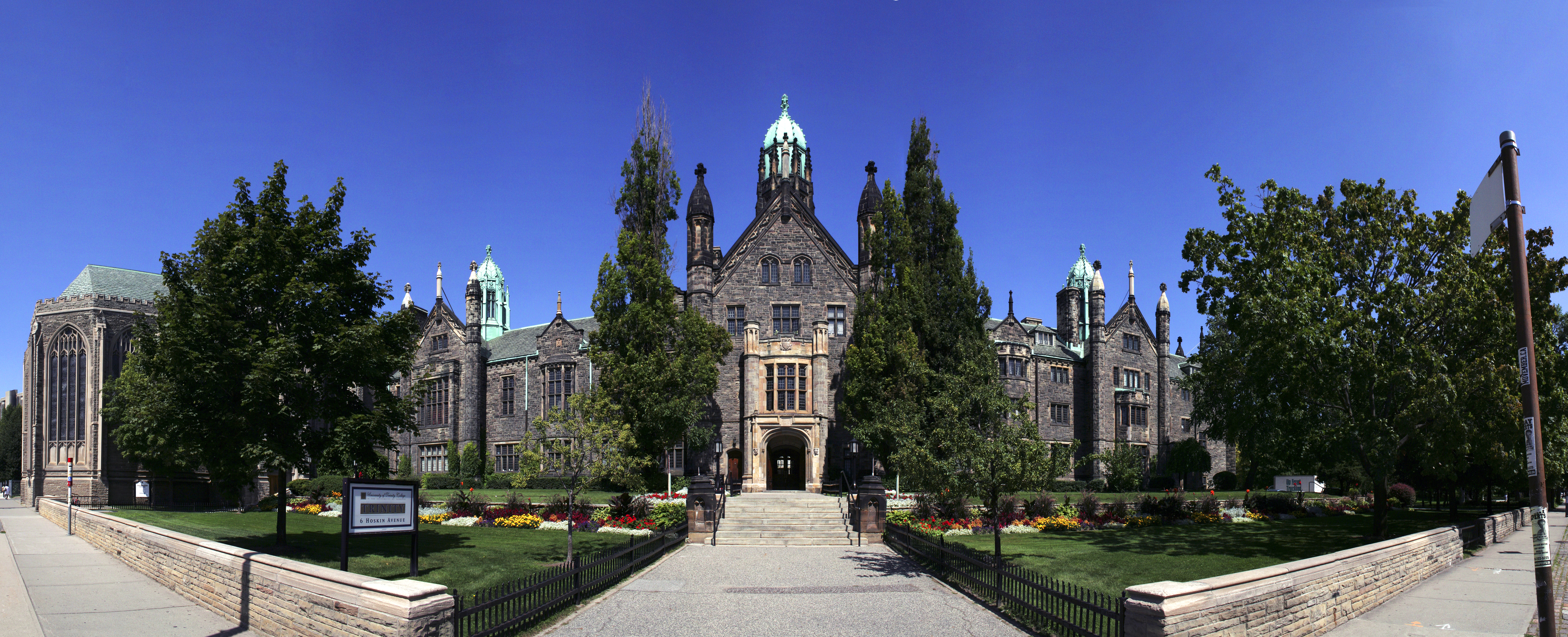
Trinity College, Seaborn's alma mater.

During his time in Moscow, Seaborn passed on covert messages to and from Colonel Oleg Penkovsky, a senior officer in the GRU (Soviet military intelligence) who worked as a spy for the British MI6 and the American CIA. Unlike Penkovsky, who was executed after his arrest by the KGB, Seaborn enjoyed diplomatic immunity and so he was never in danger. The worse that could have happened to him if his work for the CIA and MI6 were exposed was being declared persona non grata by the Soviets and being expelled. His assistance to the CIA with Penkovsky, the top Anglo-American spy in the Soviet Union in 1961–1962, won him the trust of many in Washington.

== International Control Commission and Seaborn Mission ==
Seaborn served as the Canadian Commissioner to the International Control Commission (ICC), which was formed to supervise the Geneva Accords of 1954. The ICC had diplomats and officers from Canada, India, Poland. They were to present an annual report to the Soviet Foreign Minister and the British Foreign Secretary about how well North Vietnam and South Vietnam were observing the Geneva Accords. When the ICC was founded in 1954, it was believed that it would last for only two years since elections would be held to reunify Vietnam in 1956, but as they were never held, the ICC went on until 1973. As part of their monitoring duties, the Indian, Polish, and Canadian delegates of the ICC were entitled to go anywhere in North and South Vietnam and to speak to officials of either regime. That allowed the commissioners a unique access to the leaders of both of the rival Vietnamese regimes. Seaborn did not speak Vietnamese but was fluent in French, the colonial language spoken by the educated in both parts of Vietnam, which enabled him to make informal contacts with officials on both sides.

In 1964, Canadian External Affairs Minister Paul Martin Sr. called Seaborn one of Canada's "most ablest diplomats." Seaborn lived in Saigon and came to renew his friendship with the American ambassador to South Vietnam, Henry Cabot Lodge Jr., whom he had known since the 1950s, when Lodge was the American ambassador to the United Nations. Lodge advised US Secretary of State Dean Rusk that Seaborn, with his ability to go anywhere in the two Vietnams and his fluent French, would be the ideal emissary to North Vietnam. US president Lyndon Johnson selected Seaborn to be his "back channel" to Ho Chi Minh. Johnson successfully requested from Pearson, who had become Prime Minister in April 1963, permission to use Seaborn as his "back channel." On April 30, 1964, Rusk visited Ottawa to discuss with Martin and Pearson the plan to use Seaborn as Johnson's emissary. On May 28, 1964, Pearson visited New York to give a speech before the United Nations General Assembly, and during the same visit to New York, Pearson met Johnson to give his approval to what the Americans called Operation Bacon. Ho Chi Minh had a strong dislike of Westerners, and Seaborn was never allowed to meet him.

At the same time, the Polish Commissioner to the ICC, Mieczysław Maneli, was also working as a "back channel" to find a way to end the war and had the additional advantage over Seaborn of being allowed to meet Ho Chi Minh. Lodge was in contact with Maneli to whom he was introduced via the Italian ambassador, Giovanni d'Orlandi, but preferred to use Seaborn, whom he had known for some time, rather than Maneli, whom he did not know that well. Maneli disliked Lodge, found the snobbish manners of the Boston Brahmin Lodge off-putting, and later said that Lodge was one of the most arrogant men whom he had ever met.

Maneli defected to the United States in 1968 and in 1971 he published a book, The War of the Vanquished, which recounted his experiences on the ICC. He wrote that Seaborn and the rest of Canadian delegation tended to be very pro-American but that he was "struck" by its "loyal co-operation" in attempting to make the ICC work. The rules of the ICC required the chairman to be an Indian, and Seaborn often clashed with the Indian delegation, whom he accused of being very biased towards North Vietnam and against South Vietnam.

In 1964 and 1965, Seaborn was involved in what historians have called the "Seaborn Mission," a Canadian attempt to end the Vietnam War through shuttle diplomacy. Seaborn repeatedly flew back and forth from Washington to Hanoi. Seaborn was to deliver messages between Washington and Hanoi, but he was made responsible to Ottawa, which also had the right to amend the messages that he was asked to carry. Before leaving for Hanoi, Seaborn was briefed by William H. Sullivan, an aide to Assistant Secretary of State for Asia, William Bundy, on the American objectives in North Vietnam. Seaborn was to assess the state of public opinion in North Vietnam and to see if it was growing weary of the war that had been essentially continuous since 1945. He was also to assess the effects of the Sino-Soviet split on North Vietnam and to determine whether Ho favoured China or the Soviet Union. Finally, Seaborn was to assess whether there were any splits within the North Vietnamese Politburo. Seaborn flew into North Vietnam abroad a rickety Air France Stratoliner, whose two pilots had an alarming habit of drinking champagne on the job.

On 18 June 1964, Seaborn arrived in Hanoi to meet Premier Phạm Văn Đồng with an offer from Johnson promising billions of American economic aid and diplomatic recognition of North Vietnam in exchange for North Vietnam ending its attempts to overthrow the government of South Vietnam. Seaborn also warned that Johnson had told him that he was considering a strategic bombing campaign against North Vietnam if the offer was rejected. Seaborn stated that North Vietnam would suffer the "greatest devastation" from American bombing and that Johnson had both the power and willingness to turn North Vietnam into a wasteland. Đồng told Seaborn that the American terms were unacceptable and demanded the end of American assistance to South Vietnam, South Vietnam to become neutral in the Cold War, and the National Liberation Front (better known as the Viet Cong) to be allowed to take part in a coalition government in Saigon. Đồng told Seaborn that his nation did not want a war with the United States: "Our people will accept sacrifices whatever they may be. But the DRV [Democratic Republic of Vietnam] will not enter the war... we shall not provoke the U.S." The North Vietnamese did not see Seaborn as neutral and regarded him as being close to an American spy. Speaking in French, Đồng told Seaborn the war was "drame, national, fondamental" to his government. Afterwards, Seaborn reported to Martin, "We would be unwise at this stage to count on war weariness or factionalism within the leadership... to cause North Vietnam to jump at the chance of reaching accommodation with USA."

On August 13, 1964, Seaborn returned to Hanoi to meet Đồng again. The message that Johnson had asked Seaborn to deliver was felt in Ottawa to be too inflammatory, and the mandarins removed some of the blunter passages, but the message that Seaborn delivered was faithful to the spirit but not the content in which Johnson had drafted it. Seaborn told Đồng that recent meetings with Johnson made Seaborn understand that Johnson was seriously using the powers that he just gained from the Gulf of Tonkin Resolution to go to war, but Seaborn also stated that Johnson was willing to offer "economic and other benefits" if only North Vietnam would cease trying to overthrow the government of South Vietnam. Seaborn further stated that Johnson had told him that North Vietnam would "suffer the consequences" if it continued on its "present course."

Đồng rejected the offer and said that he would rather see the war engulf "the whole of Southeast Asia" than abandon his vision of one communist Vietnam. Đồng accused the United States of escalating the war and told Seaborn that North Vietnam would never give up. Seaborn's report that the North Vietnamese were not interested in compromise but were convinced of their eventual victory greatly encouraged the Johnson administration to favour the escalation of American involvement in the war. In December 1964, Seaborn again visited Hanoi, where he was met only by junior officials, as the North Vietnamese had lost interest in talking to him. Seaborn made six visits to North Vietnam and was uncertain if their purpose was really to prevent a war or merely to justify greater American involvement.

On February 13, 1965, Johnson used his powers under the Gulf of Tonkin resolution to order a bombing campaign against North Vietnam. In the majority report, the Indian and Polish ICC commissioners condemned the United States, but Seaborn, in the minority report, argued that the attempts by North Vietnam to overthrow South Vietnam had excused the bombing raids. Seaborn had ordered by Pearson and Martin to take a pro-American interpretation out of fear of antagonising Johnson, but the report further increased North Vietnamese distrust of Seaborn. Pearson, in a speech at Temple University on April 2, 1965, suggested that the United States should pause the bombing of North Vietnam, which enraged Johnson, as Pearson discovered to his discomfort the next day, when he visited Johnson at Camp David. Pearson was screamed at by Johnson throughout his visit and treated with maximum disrespect. As a result of Pearson's speech, Johnson came to be distrustful of Canada and lost interest in the Seaborn Mission. The Americans also stopped sharing information with the Canadians about their Vietnam policy, which caused Pearson to feel that Seaborn was placed in an impossible situation of trying to negotiate without knowing everything that was happening. In June 1965, Johnson revealed the Canadian back channel to North Vietnam in a television press conference and caused Seaborn when he heard the news to exclaim, "My God! He's blown my cover."

Seaborn appeared on the cover of the November 15, 1965 issue of Maclean's magazine under the title Our Man in Saigon. The journalist Terrance Robertson wrote:

"While two giants, the United States and China, wrestle —if unofficially— across the killing grounds of Vietnam, a 41-year-old Canadian, James Blair Seaborn, moves quietly behind both fronts in a frustrating, vital search for a formula for peace.... Mid all the brutal violence, the harsh insulting language and the shrill cacophony of war which makes Vietnam the most explosive trouble spot on earth, a man you have probably forgotten (if you had ever heard of him) is officially charged with keeping the peace. He is our man in Saigon, a slight, bespectacled, and deceptively bookish-looking Canadian civil servant from Toronto named James Blair Seaborn. He lives in this tense, frenetic city, the southern terminal of the most crucial undeclared war in history, the focal point of what could become the most total war of all time. He is, in this nightmare environment, still vainly attempting to do what he came here to do nearly eighteen months ago — maintain a paper peace between North and South Vietnam, whose once-furtive hostilities now involve semi-confrontation between Red China (and a lukewarm Russia) on the one side, and the United States (backed by somewhat reluctant allies) on the other."

Seaborn told Robertson:

"Frustrating as it is, it may be that if this commission can stand and wait long enough it will be able to play a worthwhile role in the future.... Our function was drawn up when this was a local civil war so we proceed as if it were still true. We have to ignore the rather awesome confrontation the big powers have superimposed upon it. Once we have the evidence we take it up with the North Vietnamese military authorities, asking them to explain how weapons made in the Soviet Union or Red China, for instance, happened to find their way into the hands of the Viet Cong. If there's no answer — and there usually isn't — then I register the South Vietnamese complaint as a violation of the cease-fire by North Vietnam. Sometimes we three commissioners don't agree, and this can be irritating.... You have to remember that Britain, France, the Soviet Union and Red China agreed on the cease-fire, set up the ICSC (which Canada, Poland and India undertook to form) and are responsible for paying its operating expenses. Britain and Russia are our co-chairmen. The U.S. didn't sign it, didn't like it particularly, but went along with it just the same. So now we have a situation in which these same powers all but ignore that we exist. The Soviet Union and China send missiles and arms into North Vietnam, and the U.S. sends an entire war machine into South Vietnam."

Despite enjoying diplomatic immunity, Seaborn had a frangipani tree growing outside of the terrace of his house in Saigon and told Robertson that it blocked the view of the terrace and made it difficult for a sniper to target him. Seaborn described life in Saigon as both tedious and dangerous. Seaborn spoke of how the Saigon police tended to execute on the spot people caught violating the nightly curfew and how the Viet Cong frequently threw bombs at restaurants popular with Westerners. The decaying telephone system left over by the French often did not work, and the heat, humidity, and rainstorms made daily life in Saigon difficult. Most of the fighting occurred in rural areas of South Vietnam, but Saigon was still a dangerous city. In 1965, the Viet Cong bombed a riverboat restaurant in the Mekong river popular with Westerners, killing 44 people.

== Troubleshooter in Ottawa ==
After leaving the ICC, Seaborn returned to Ottawa where he became head of the East European Division at External Affairs and in 1967 took charge of the Far Eastern Division. In 1968, Mitchell Sharp replaced Martin as foreign minister, and he recalled in a 1987 interview that the Department of External Affairs was in "good shape". Sharp listed Seaborn together with Marcel Cadieux, Edgar Ritchie, Klaus Goldschlag, John G. H. Halstead, and James "Si" Taylor as a team of "very able" diplomats that he had working for him, many of whom he was sorry to lose to other departments in the 1970s. In 1969, Prime Minister Pierre Trudeau announced his intention to establish diplomatic relations with the People's Republic of China. As head of the Far Eastern Division, Seaborn played an important role in the talks that began in Stockholm in May 1969 between Canadian and Chinese diplomats. In October 1970, Canada broke off diplomatic relations with the Republic of China government, controlling only Taiwan, and recognized the People's Republic of China government, controlling mainland China, as the legitimate government of China.

After retiring from the diplomatic corps, Seaborn worked in series of bureaucratic jobs in Ottawa. Trudeau disliked the Ministry of External Affairs but admired the elite diplomatic corps and recruited many diplomats to serve in the civil service. Seaborn served as the Assistant Deputy Minister in the Department of Consumer and Corporate Affairs in 1970 to 1974 and as the Deputy Minister in Environment Canada in 1975 to 1982. In 1971, the Pentagon Papers were published, and "the Seaborn Mission" first came to widespread notice and caused much controversy in Canada. On June 17, 1971, during a debate in the House of Commons, External Affairs Minister Mitchell Sharp had to defend Seaborn from allegations of having served as "an errand boy bearing threats of an expanded war" and that the Canadians serving on the ICC had not acted in a neutral fashion but had a very pro-American stance.

The Austrian-born Canadian journalist Peter C. Newman wrote in 1971 about the Seaborn Mission, "There was something particularly distasteful about the fact that in the ugly deceptions that led to the United States' escalation of the Vietnam war — as revealed to the world by the New York Times earlier this summer — Canada's role was to act as an American messenger boy. The Pentagon's dispatch of J. Blair Seaborn, then our representative on the International Control Commission, to carry its threats of bombing raids to North Vietnam, even though we were supposed to be neutrals, sums up in one telling incident just how seriously the Americans regard our valiantly 'independent' posture in foreign affairs." Newman saw diplomats such as Seaborn as reflecting all the worse flaws of the "Canadian Mandarins" and wrote "the old-fashioned mandarin mind, one of the very best models which he still determinedly uses to set the pattern of our foreign relations. This mentality, formed in the Thirties and Forties, continues to dominate both the ideology and techniques of certain federal departments, particularly External Affairs. It's an approach that reflects a colonial attitude which, when it proclaims that it's acting in 'good faith,' is really acting out of obedience and little more. Discreet, neat, dead from the neck down, deeply attached to the British tradition of muddling through, these old-fashioned mandarins (and there are exceptions) tend to view life as an intellectual tumbling exercise. Substituting good manners for compassion, light on both feet and ready to move in any direction, they believe that the duty of the responsible public man is to exercise restraining influence on risk-taking."

In his bestselling 1974 book Snow Job, the journalist Charles P. B. Taylor accused Seaborn of being an "agent" for the United States who was attempting to intimidate Ho on behalf of Johnson. In his 1986 book Quiet Complicity, the Canadian historian Victor Levant entitled the chapter dealing with the mission as "J. Blair Seaborn: Choreboy for Moloch." Moloch was a god revered in ancient Phoenicia and Canaan whose worship demanded human sacrifice, especially that of children who were burned alive to honor him, and the comparison of the United States to Moloch gives one an idea how Levant felt about the "Seaborn Mission." By contrast, the Canadian historian Greg Donaghy defended Seaborn from what he called an "unjustified and inaccurate" charge. Donaghy argued the American government had the right to clarify its opinions on the Vietnam War to the government of North Vietnam, as Seaborn had done. Much of the controversy about the "Seaborn Mission" was caused by the Johnson administration publicly insisting that it had no plans for a war in Vietnam but meanwhile made Seaborn deliver a message to Dong in June 1964 in Hanoi to warn of the "greatest devastation" that would result from the American bombing of North Vietnam. The fact that the double game of the Johnson administration in 1964 was not revealed until the leaked Pentagon Papers in 1971 increased the sense that Johnson and others in his administration had been duplicitous to the American people. Seaborn as Johnson's emissary ended being caught as part of the backlash against Johnson.

Of the many duties that Seaborn performed, the one that he enjoyed the most was serving as Deputy Minister at Environment Canada. As many Canadian cabinet ministers do not know their portfolios very well, it is often the bureaucratic Deputy Minister who provides the real leadership in their departments. Environment Canada was a newly established ministry founded in 1971 and was foundering by 1975 under inexperienced leadership, which made to Trudeau in 1975 send in Seaborn to "fix" the department. Raymond Robinson, an assistant deputy minister at Environment Canada, remembered that "His diplomatic skill was much needed." Seaborn, an active athlete and outdoorsman who excelled at hiking, skiing, and canoeing, was described as having a passion for environmental issues, having the ability of obtaining the trust of others, and inspiring his colleagues to work effectively. Art Collin, the chief science adviser to the government called Seaborn "a wise and gentle leader" who finally made Environment Canada work as an effective ministry. Donaghy described Seaborn as being unfailingly polite and courteous but also very firm as he set out to purge Environment Canada of its dysfunctional tendencies.

Seaborn served the chairman to the International Joint Commission from 1982 to 1985 and as the Intelligence and Security Coordinator to the Privy Council from February 1985 to May 1989. The International Joint Commission handled waters shared by Canada and the United States, and much of Seaborn's time on the Joint Commission was taken up by the problems of pollution on the Great Lakes. The fact that the Joint Commission had its own experts to evaluate pollution was later used by Seaborn as a major factor in its success, as he argued that the Americans tended not to take Canadian complaints about Great Lakes pollution seriously until American experts reporting to the Joint Commission had confirmed them. In 1985, there was much recrimination over the bombing of Air India Flight 182 and allegations that bureaucratic rivalries between the Royal Canadian Mounted Police (RMCP) and the Canadian Security Intelligence Service (CSIS) had led to the failure to stop the bombing although the suspects had been monitored by both the RCMP and CSIS. CSIS had been founded in 1984 and taken over intelligence and counterintelligence work that had been traditionally performed by the RCMP, which started a bureaucratic turf war, as the RCMP still insisted on its right to investigate a terrorist plot involving Sikh separatists living in Canada to bomb Air India. Much of Seaborn's time as Intelligence and Security Coordinator was taken up with futile efforts at making the RCMP and CSIS co-operate and share information. Additionally, in February 1985, Seaborn became the chairman of the Intelligence Advisory Committee, which oversaw the work of Communications Security Establishment, Canada's signet agency, and provided advice on intelligence matters to Prime Minister Brian Mulroney. Reflecting his Anglican faith, Seaborn devoted his spare time to raising money to help rebuild the Anglican Christ Church Cathedral in Ottawa, which had been damaged by a fire in 1989. In March 1990, Seaborn became involved in a two-year project to study the connection between water shortages and war in the Third World.

== Seaborn Panel ==
After his ostensible retirement in 1990, he served for eight years as chairman of the Environmental Assessment Panel on Nuclear Fuel Waste Management. The most important conclusion of the "Seaborn Panel" was that burying spent nuclear reactor rods was technically safe but politically toxic because "not in my backyard" has guided the politics of the Canadian nuclear industry.

The nuclear power plants in Ontario, Quebec, and New Brunswick are owned by the respective provincial governments, which gives the nuclear power industry the powerful support of the provinces. The provincially-owned hydro companies, particularly Ontario Hydro, had been dominated for decades by cliques of engineers which have been likened to "some sort of special nuclear cult." Within the electricity industry, nuclear power was seen as a glamorous futuristic way of generating electricity, which led to an institutional preference for nuclear power over other forms of power generation such as hydroelectricity, which was viewed as a boring backward way of generating power. The Canadian scholar Genevieve Fuji Johnson wrote in the 1970s that nuclear power was presented in Canada in "hyperbolic terms" and was portrayed as the glittering "technology of the future" that would power endless economic growth. The Arab oil shock of 1973-1974 and the resulting economic turmoil made many policymakers in Canada as elsewhere favour nuclear power as a way to end the dependence upon oil imports from the troublesome Middle East. The problem of disposing of nuclear waste was treated by the nuclear industry as a small problem, and executives and engineers in the nuclear power industry tended to be "abrasive" towards those who raised the question of disposing of nuclear waste. Having decided on nuclear power for reasons of ego, rather than of economic rationality, the "nuclear cult" of engineers succeeded in having vast sums of money spent on building nuclear power plants over other forms of electricity generation, despite the problems inherent in nuclear energy. Those issues are common to the electricity power industry globally, with reports stating the electricity industry in the United States is likewise dominated by a "cult" of engineers that is determined to build more and more nuclear power plants. The federal government has long wanted to promote the CANDU reactor as a showcase of Canadian technology, but in the 20th century, the only foreign nation that ever purchased CANDU rectors was Romania in 1978. Having spent billions developing the CANDU rector in the 1950s and the 1960s, the federal government was desperate to sell CANDU rectors and so was inclined to approve any plans to build nuclear power plants in Canada as long as the plants used CANDU rectors.

Building more nuclear power plants while maintaining the existing ones required a means to dispose of the nuclear waste, a question that had been ducked for decades by successive governments, which led to the creation of the "Seaborn Panel" in 1989. The Atomic Energy of Canada Limited (AECL), the Crown corporation owned by the federal government, seemed to have seen the "Seaborn Panel" as a mere rubber stamp designed to bless its plans, first floated in 1978, to build a deep storage facility in the near north and wanted the panel's remit narrowly limited to technical questions. Between 1987 and 1991, the AECL spent $4 million Canadian dollars in advertising designed to influence public opinion in favor of waste disposal plans. Fuji Johnson wrote that the AECL in its public pronouncements in the 1970s, 1980s, and 1990s tended to speak as if the question of disposing nuclear waste were a relatively minor concern incidental to the nuclear power industry, instead of being a major question. Canada started producing nuclear energy in 1946, but no permanent site for storing nuclear waste had ever been selected, much less built. Seaborn was appointed to head the panel in October 1989, and it was expected that he would produce a report within a year. By the late 1980s, the lack of a permanent site for storing nuclear waste was becoming a serious problem, but the Mulroney government, like all other Canadian governments, did not wish to antagonize voters by choosing a site and so created the Seaborn Panel to make the unpopular decisions that the government dared not make itself.

The first sessions of the Seaborn Panel were held in 1990. The nuclear power industry was hostile to the "Seaborn Panel" right from the start and saw the question of opposition to the planned disposing of nuclear waste as opposition to the building ofmore nuclear power plants. Two thirds of the written submissions received by the "Seaborn Panel" in its first sessions in 1990–1991 stated that treating the nuclear waste disposal question as a simple scientific question was an attempt to marginalize other opinions about the issue and demanded a broader scope. The "Seaborn Panel" received 536 written submissions and 531 witnesses. In its submission before the panel, the AECL formally asked Seaborn to treat environmental, economic, and social concerns as minor considerations and to conduct the hearings primarily around scientific questions, but Seaborn ignored it. The Scientific Review Group over the objections of the AECL reported to Seaborn as conducting a parallel set of hearings, as the AECL wished. In another submission to the Seaborn Panel, the AECL stated it was "disturbed" by the "indecisiveness" of "public policy" towards the nuclear industry and stated that it had already been "persuaded" by the scientific research conducted that its plans were sound.

Seaborn, during the hearings of the "Seaborn Panel," insisted on involving the broader public over the objections of the nuclear power industry, which preferred him to consult only scientists, executives, and engineers. Seaborn invited representatives of First Nations band councils, environmentalists, and members of communities already storing nuclear waste to testify. A number of church groups argued before the hearings that an ethical perspective was just as important as the scientific and economic perspectives when it came to considering means of disposing of spent nuclear rods and other nuclear waste. First Nations groups were adamantly opposed to the government's plans to dump nuclear waste in a deep storage facility somewhere in the near north of Canada. Leiss wrote the public hearings that Seaborn conducted in 1996–1997 represented the democratization of decisionmaking on how to dispose of nuclear waste, as Seaborn involved the public and insistied that the opinions of ordinary Canadians were just as important as those of experts. Seaborn concluded that the "social" aspects of nuclear waste disposal was just as valid as the "technical" aspects. Before the Seaborn Panel, decisionmaking about the nuclear waste question had been secretive, with the senior bureaucrats consulting only scientists, engineers, and executives. During the hearings, many ordinary people showed up before the Seaborn Panel to express their fears about the previously secretive decisionmaking process as well as the conflict of interest caused by the provinces that were partly in charge of regulating the nuclear industry also owning the Crown corporations that in turn owned and operated the nuclear power plants. Many of the ordinary people who attended the "Seaborn Panel" expressed much fear about the fact that it takes over a million years for the radioactivity in the spent nuclear rods to reach levels that are safe for humans, and they wondered if the government's plans to dump the rods in a deep storage facility somewhere in the near north was just a way to burden future generations with the problem and the cost of dealing with the rods. Many people also expressed fears that the radioactivity from the spent rods would leak into the groundwater and otherwise damage the local environment.

As the "Seaborn Panel" hearings took on a more anti-nuclear tune, the federal government moved to rebut its conclusions in advance. In July 1996, the Policy Framework for Radioactive Waste was released, but most of the statement had been written in 1995. It was written by a committee consisting of representatives of the federal and provincial governments; the AECL, Ontario Hydro, Hydro-Québec and New Brunswick Power; nuclear waste disposal companies; manufacturers of nuclear equipment; and a lobby group, the Canadian Nuclear Association. Unlike most of the statements made before the "Seaborn Panel," the Policy Framework for Radioactive Waste stated, "Resolving radioactive waste issues and process towards disposal will make the nuclear option more acceptable as a source of energy and reassure customers of the CANDU reactor that Canada has a valid and integrated approach to the management of wastes from the CANDU reactor cycle." The purposes were to allow the governments to say that it was already addressing the concerns raised by the "Seaborn Panel" and to rebut the aspects of the panel's expected conclusions that the governments disliked. In 1997, the federal government passed the Nuclear Safety and Control Act, the first legislation passed on the subject since 1967. Most of the changes in the Nuclear Safety and Control Act were purely cosmetic, such as renaming the Atomic Energy Control Board to the Canadian Nuclear Safety Commission, and the apparent purpose of the act was made it appear that the government was already moving on the nuclear safety issue before Seaborn had presented his report. The act also stipulated for a trust fund to be established to cover the costs of dealing with nuclear waste and paid by the owners of nuclear plants, but it failed to explain how the funds were to be contributed, and no trust fund was in fact established.

Seaborn's report of February 1998, which was described as having "shocked" the government of Jean Chrétien, concluded that there was a lack of "broad public support" and that the government's plans to bury nuclear waste in the near north of Canada did "not have the required level of acceptability." The report concluded: "On the balance, we think the models the proponents used are sufficiently well developed to demonstrate that its concept of deep geological disposal can be used as a basis for designing a site-specific facility that is likely to meet regulatory requirements. There is a general agreement that a final conclusion would require site-specific data and performance analyses that are based on site-specific designs." Despite its vague conclusions, the report written by Seaborn and the other commissioners rejected the specific plans submitted jointly by Ontario Hydro and AECL for a nuclear waste disposal site in northern Ontario by making many scientific objections on the grounds of safety about the AECL-Ontario Hydro plans. The multibillion-dollar nuclear power industry, an influential force in Canadian politics, was outraged by the conclusions of the "Seaborn Panel," with one nuclear engineer writing that "a societal perspective is not relevant to safety as normally defined." The conclusions that the governments and the nuclear power industry had to take into account public opinion was popular, and the scientist William Leiss wrote that "twenty years of federal government policy on nuclear waste lay in shambles." The reaction of the nuclear power industry was to misrepresent Seaborn's conclusions that the waste disposal concept were scientifically and environmentally sound and that the only problem was a public relations problem since the Canadian people were misinformed. That ignored Seaborn's statement that opposition was "more nuanced." In response, the Chrétien government tabled in December 1998 the bill that became the Nuclear Waste Fuel Act of 2002. The act stated:

- The responsibility for safety of nuclear power plants lies with the owners and operators.
- The owners of nuclear power plants must establish a NWMO (Nuclear Waste Management Organization), which is to operate independently and must submit a report to the government within three years to lay out its plans to dispose of nuclear waste.
- The government is to establish a trust fund with money to be supplied by the owners of nuclear power plants to pay for a permanent disposal facility.

The Nuclear Waste Fuel Act ignored Seaborn's recommendation for the question of how to safety dispose of nuclear waste to be performed by an outside agency since a self-assessment is instead undertaken by the nuclear power industry itself. Fuji Johnson accused the government of Canada of being dishonest and wrote that the Policy Framework for Radioactive Waste, released by the federal and provincial governments promising the NWMO in July 1996, stated that it "anticipated" the panel's conclusions, but later on, the government stated that the NWMO was created in 2002 "in response" to the paanel's report of February 1998. Northwatch, an environmentalist group based in northern Ontario, accused the Chrétien government of disregarding Seaborn's recommendation for the NWMO to "be formed at arm's length" from the nuclear industry and claimed that the stated independence of the NWMO was largely bogus. Northwatch also pointed that the first chairwoman of the NWMO, Elizabeth Dowdeswell, was a former executive of the board of the International Thermonuclear Experimental Reactor company and that she had often expressed support for more nuclear power plants. Northwatch argued that she was not "independent" of the nuclear industry in the manner that Seaborn had recommended.

The American scholar Barry Rabe wrote that the "Seaborn Panel" illustrated all of the problems of Canadian decisionmaking about nuclear waste by observing that Canada should have built a permanent nuclear waste storage site while it built its first nuclear plants and that the "Seaborn Panel" should not have been necessary in the first place. Rabe further wrote that the panel had taken nearly a decade to reach its conclusions "essentially advising the Canadian government to start from scratch, with new institutions and an extended process designed to win public trust." Rabe wrote that the fundamental problem in disposing of nuclear waste in Canada is that no one wants a permanent nuclear waste site close to their residence or the nuclear waste to be transported close to their own communities, but the nuclear power plants have been built without the problem of disposing the nuclear waste being addressed.

== Retirement ==
After finally retiring in 1998, he was awarded the Order of Canada in 2000. In 2010, he told the journalist Tony Blair of The Ottawa Citizen, "I hoped to live until the end of this century. I didn't do any preparing for it. I just happened to live this long.... I tell young friends, 'Don't retire at 65. Take a part-time job if you can.'" In a 2014 opinion piece, the diplomat Jeremy Kinsman listed the Seaborn Mission as an example of the sort of diplomacy that Canada should practice and argued the attempt to play an "honest broker" in attempting to end the Vietnam War, even if unsuccessful, had still been a noble endeavour. In 2015, Seaborn spoke to the media about an incident that occurred on December 14, 2014, when a criminal, named Ian Bush, was wanted for three murders, broke into the home of his 101-year old neighbour, Ernest Côté, and tied a plastic bag around his head: "He had the wits about him to realize he had to get the damn bag off his head if he was going to live. He crawled across the floor to where he knew there was some scissors and cut the thing off."

In 2019, a fall badly injured Seaborn, who died on November 11. A devout member of the Church of England, his funeral service was held at the Anglican Christ Church Cathedral in Ottawa.

== Articles by Seaborn ==
- Seaborn, J.Blair (Spring 1983). "Developments in Chemicals' Control Emerge at OECD High-level Meeting". Environmental Conservation. 10 (1): 74. doi:10.1017/S037689290001198X.
- Seaborn, J. Blair (March 28–31, 1990). "Transfrontier Environmental Damage". Proceedings of the Annual Meeting (American Society of International Law). 84 (1): 12–31.
- Seaborn, J. Blair. Mission to Hanoi: The Canadian Channel, essay in Canadian Peacekeepers in Indochina 1954–1973, Recollections, Arthur Blanchette, Editor, 2002.

== Sources ==
- Addington, Larry (2000). America's War in Vietnam: A Short Narrative History. Bloomington: Indiana University Press. ISBN 978-0-253-00321-8..
- Barry, Donald; Hillike, John (1995). Canada's Department of External Affairs, Volume 2: Coming of Age, 1946-1968. Montreal: McGill University Press. ISBN 0773562346.
- Blair, Anne (1995). Lodge in Vietnam: A Patriot Abroad. New Haven: Yale University Press. ISBN 0300062265..
- Bothwell, Robert (Winter 2000). "The Further Shore: Canada and Vietnam". International Journal. 56 (1): 89–114. doi:10.2307/40203533. JSTOR 40203533.
- Bothwell, Robert; Granatstein, Jack (2017). Trudeau's World: Insiders Reflect on Foreign Policy, Trade, and Defence, 1968-84. Vancouver: University of British Columbia Press. ISBN 978-0774836401.
- Donaghy, Greg; Roussel, Stéphane (2004). Escott Reid: Diplomat and Scholar. Montreal: McGill University Press. ISBN 0773527133..
- Firestone, Bernard (November 2013). "Failed Mediation: U Thant, the Johnson Administration, and the Vietnam War". Diplomatic History. 37 (5): 1060–1089. doi:10.1093/dh/dht046.
- Frey, Marc (1998). Geschichte des Vietnamkriegs: Die Tragödie in Asien und das Ende des amerikanischen Traums. Munich: C.H. Beck. ISBN 978-3-406-69263-5.
- Gates, John (July 1990). "People's War in Vietnam". The Journal of Military History. 54 (3): 325–346. doi:10.2307/1985938. JSTOR 1985938..
- Fuji Johnson, Genevieve (2010). Nuclear Waste Management in Canada Critical Issues, Critical Perspectives. Vancouver: University of British Columbia Press. ISBN 9780774859035.
- Fuji Johnson, Genevieve (June 2007). "The Discourse of Democracy in Canadian Nuclear Waste Management policy". Policy Sciences. 40 (2): 79–99. doi:10.1007/s11077-007-9032-0. S2CID 154197056.
- Granatstein, Jack (1982). The Ottawa Men: The Civil Service Mandarins, 1935-1957. Oxford: Oxford University Press. ISBN 019540386X..
- Herring, George (2014). The Secret Diplomacy of the Vietnam War: The Negotiating Volumes of the Pentagon Papers. Austin: University of Texas. ISBN 978-1477304259..
- Hunt, David (1993). The American War in Vietnam'. Ithaca: SEAP Publications. ISBN 0877271313..
- Homer-Dixo, Thomas; Rathjens, George; Boutwell, Jeffrey (November 1990). "Environmental Change and Acute Conflict". Bulletin of the American Academy of Arts and Sciences. 44 (2): 14–18. doi:10.2307/3824879. JSTOR 3824879.
- Karnow, Stanley (1983). Vietnam: A History. New York: Viking. ISBN 0670746045..
- Langguth, A.J (2000). Our Vietnam: The War 1954-1975. New York: Simon and Schuster. ISBN 0743212444..
- Levant, Victor (1986). Quiet Complicity: Canadian involvement in the Vietnam War. Toronto: Between the Lines Publishing. ISBN 0919946739..
- Leiss, Willam (July 2008). "Nuclear Waste Management At the Interface of Science and Policy: The Canadian Experience". Energy & Environment. 19 (3): 413–426. doi:10.1260/095830508784641354. S2CID 154559254.
- Maneli, Mieczysław (1971). War of the Vanquished. New York: Harper & Row..
- McCaffrey, Stephen C. (2019). The Law of International Watercourses. Oxford: Oxford University Press. ISBN 978-0191056727.
- Preston, Andrew (January 2003). "Balancing War and Peace: Canadian Foreign Policy and the Vietnam War, 1961–1965". Diplomatic History. 27 (1): 73–111. doi:10.1111/1467-7709.00340..
- Rabe, Barry (2003). "Sitting Nuclear Waste". In Leslie Alexander Pal; R. Kent Weaver (eds.). The Government Taketh Away: The Politics of Pain in the United States and Canada. Washington, DC: Georgetown University Press. pp. 195–232. ISBN 1589014456.
- Roberts, Naomi Ziman; Roberts, Peter (2005). First Foreign Posting: Moscow 1958-1959. Ottawa: Carleton University Press. ISBN 1894131797.
- Ross, Douglas Alan (1984). In the Interests of Peace: Canada and Vietnam, 1954-1973. Toronto: University of Toronto Press. ISBN 0802056326.
- Schmidt, Lawrence E; Marratto, Scott (2008). The End of Ethics in a Technological Society. Montreal: McGill University Press. ISBN 978-0773533363.
- Taylor, Charles (1974). Snow Job: Canada, the United States and Vietnam (1954 to 1973). Toronto: House of Anansi. ISBN 088784717X..
