= Victor Moore (disambiguation) =

Victor Moore (1876–1962) was an American theatre and film actor.

Victor Moore may also refer to:

- Victor Campbell Moore, Canadian diplomat
- Victor E. Moore (1897–1982), American businessman and politician
- Vic Moore (born 1943) American martial artist
