= Ramchundur Goburdhun =

Indian diplomat (1911–1992)

Chief Commissioner of the International Control Commission for Vietnam
- In office 1963 – 1965; Serving with J. Blair Seaborn and Mieczysław Maneli
- Preceded by: Anant Naravane
- Succeeded by: M. A. Rahman

Personal details
- Born: 15 August 1911 Rivière du Rempart District, British Mauritius
- Died: 29 November 1992 (aged 81) New Delhi, Delhi, India
- Education: Royal College Port Louis; Institut français du Royaume-Uni; University of Lille
- Occupation: Lawyer, diplomat

Ramchundur Goburdhun (15 August 1911 – 29 November 1992) was an Indo-Mauritian diplomat best known for his role in the "Maneli Affair" of 1963, an attempt to end the Vietnam War.

== Early life and family ==
Goburdhun was born in a middle class Indo-Mauritian family in the Rivière du Rempart District of the Mauritius, an island archipelago in the Indian Ocean where French is widely spoken.

At the time of his birth, Mauritius was a British colony. Goburdhun's grandfather had arrived in the Mauritius as an indentured laborer from India and rose up to become a schoolmaster.

Goburdhun was educated in Port Louis at the Royal College Port Louis and the Institut français du Royaume-Uni. As a child, he was considered to be "naughty and rebellious, through intelligent", and was known as "Tipu the Rebel".

His father was a stern, authoritarian man who often beat his son with a rod for his rebellious streak. An outstanding student, in spite of being frequently caned by his teachers, Goburdhun also excelled as an athlete. As the Mauritius had no universities under British colonial rule, Goburdhun left to attend university in Britain, but while on his way, passed through France, and decided to attend university there instead. Goburdhun had a lifelong love affair with Paris, which was always his favorite city.

His brother Hurrylall Goburdhun became a Judge of the Supreme Court of Mauritius.

== Lawyer and diplomat ==
Goburdhun was educated in France and remained a lifelong Francophile. While attending the University of Lille in France in the 1930s, Goburdhun befriended a young Vietnamese Catholic student named Ngô Đình Nhu, who remained a lifelong friend. Afterwards, he obtained a law degree at the Middle Temple in London. Goburdhun worked as a lawyer in Port Louis. From 1939 to 1944, he served as a judicial officer of the Supreme Court of the Mauritius. In 1943, Goburdhun was made a Civil member of the Order of the British Empire for his work as a civil servant in the Mauritius.

In 1945-1946, he served as a judge at a labour court in Port Louis. In the 1948 elections for the Legislative Council of Mauritius, he ran for office, winning 405 votes in the Pamplemousses District. Following the failure of his political career, Goburdhun moved to India, which became independent in 1947 to pursue a career in diplomacy. In 1949, he married Kamala Sinha, by whom he had one daughter, Anuradha Goburdhun Bakhshi.

Goburdhun served as the charge d'affairs at the Indian embassy in Prague, Czechoslovakia from 1948 to 1952. As India had stationed no ambassador in Prague, Goburdhun was in charge of the embassy. Once he organised a diplomatic reception to be attended by all of the other ambassadors in Prague, causing his wife to be extremely upset when she learned the British ambassador would be attending, requiring him to explain that India was now independent and he was the equal of the British ambassador. In 1951 his name briefly hit the headlines when the Czechoslovak police arrested and charged with espionage an American journalist, William N. Oatis. At Oatis's trial in Prague, Oatis confessed to espionage and named Goburdhun as one of the diplomats he was alleged to have spied for. After Oatis was released in 1953, he retracted his confession as being induced by torture, and stated he merely sometimes cross-checked information with Goburdhun, engaging in standard journalistic practice, before writing a story.

In January–February 1953, he served as the deputy secretary at the Indian foreign ministry. Goburdhun subsequently served as the counselor at the Indian embassy in Beijing in 1953-55. Before a dispute over where the precise Sino-Indian border was high up in the Himalayas spoiled Indo-Chinese relations, the relationship between the two nations were warm and friendly, and Goburdhun enjoyed being stationed in Beijing, where he was treated with respect as a diplomat from a friendly nation. It was as Goburdhun's service in China was winding down that relations between New Delhi and Beijing began to sour as India maintained its claim to the McMahon Line that had been laid down by the British in 1914 as the Sino-Indian frontier, a claim that China rejected.

From 1955 to 1957, he worked as a counselor at the Indian embassy in Paris, France. Of all his diplomatic postings, Goburdhun enjoyed the one in Paris the most, being described by his daughter as being "overjoyed" to be living in his beloved Paris. In March–December 1958, Goburdhun worked as the head of public relations department at the Foreign Ministry in New Delhi. In December 1958, Goburdhun arrived at the Dar al-Makhzen in Rabat, Morocco to present his credentials as India's ambassador to King Mohammed V. During his time in Morocco, Goburdhun came close to adopting the daughter of an Italian diplomat after her parents were drowned at sea.

== The "Maneli Affair" ==
He became chairman of the International Control Commission in October 1962 assigned to supervise the Geneva accords of 1954. Goburdhun was well suited for this role as an honest broker, establishing cordial relations with the leaders of both North Vietnam and South Vietnam. As Goburdhun was fluent in French, a language widely spoken by Vietnamese elites, he had no difficulty in communicating with Vietnamese elites. The American historian Ellen Hammer called Goburdhun an "exuberant and assertive" man with a strong interest in finding a way to end the Vietnam war.

Just after Goburdhun's arrival in Vietnam, the Sino-Indian War of October–November 1962 saw China defeat and humiliate India in a sharp, short campaign in the Himalayas. The spectacle seeing the Indian Army being utterly crushed by the Chinese People's Liberation Army and retreating in chaos back into India caused Indian diplomacy to take a pronounced anti-Chinese turn as the Indian Prime Minister Jawaharlal Nehru never forgave Mao Zedong for that humiliation. The British ambassador in Saigon, Henry Hohler, reported the Sino-Indian war was having "repercussions" on the Indian delegation to the ICC. Hohler reported to London after talking to Goburdhun that he had previously maintained that the ICC needed "positive objectivity", but after India's defeat, "he now considers it his duty to use his influence discreetly on the side of the free world-encouraging any activity which favors Western interests".

However, the conclusion Goburdhun reached was that the war was pushing North Vietnam closer to China, and that ending the war would allow the traditional Sino-Vietnamese antagonism to reassert itself as Goburdhun knew from his contacts within Hanoi that North Vietnamese leaders were willing to accept Chinese help only because the United States was supporting South Vietnam. After the Sino-Indian war, the principal aim of Indian diplomacy was to reduce and weaken China's influence in Asia. Unlike the Americans who knew little about Vietnamese history, the Indians were more familiar with the histories of near-by Asian states, and appreciated the full depth of the profound mistrust the Vietnamese had of China, a state had conquered Vietnam in 111 BC and ruled it as a Chinese province for the next thousand years. The Americans had hoped that after the Sino-Indian war that India would become an American ally in Asia as the two nations had common anti-Chinese foreign policies, but the conclusion reached by Nehru was that India should promote neutralism in Southeast Asia as the best way of reducing Chinese influence in Southeast Asia.

This was especially the case because after the Sino-Indian war on the principle that "the enemy of my enemy is my friend", Nehru took an advantage of the Sino-Soviet split to form a de facto alliance with the Soviet Union against China. Because the Americans had a military alliance with India's archenemy Pakistan, from the Indian perspective this ruled out the possibility of an alliance with the United States and caused the Indians to reach out to the Soviet Union instead. Since the Soviet Union was also supporting North Vietnam, the Indians resisted the pressure from the Americans to have their ICC delegates condemn North Vietnam. Instead of taking the expected pro-American positions, Hohler reported in late 1962 that Goburdhun was engaged in "masterly inactivity" while "marking time for an infinite period".

His daughter described Vietnam as the most difficult of his diplomatic assignments, recalling that he "spent long hours in his office and often returned in a bad mood or imprisoned in a pregnant silence. As soon as he got back, he would lock himself in his study or pace furiously along the long veranda that circled the house". Goburdhun lived in a house in Saigon built by a wealthy Chinese merchant, and notably refused to allow his children to leave the grounds of the house, saying that Saigon was too dangerous.

Working closely with the French ambassador to South Vietnam, Roger Lalouette, and the Polish Commissioner to the ICC, Mieczysław Maneli, Goburdhun met in the spring of 1963 with both Chairman Ho Chi Minh of North Vietnam and President Ngo Dinh Diem of South Vietnam to discuss a possible federation of the two Vietnams as a way to end the war. In March 1963, Maneli reported to Warsaw: "It would be desirable for the North and the guerrillas to give Diem some respite. Then, as Diem promised Goburdhun, he would get rid of the Americans by himself and would join the India line. It would be necessary to facilitate direct North-South contacts. This could take place in [New] Delhi, where the two sides have their representatives."

In 1963, North Vietnam had suffered its worst drought in a generation, and the possibility of having rice exported from the fertile Mekong river valley, South Vietnam's "rice bowl", would have solved a number of problems in North Vietnam. At the same time, the Sino-Soviet split with both Nikita Khrushchev and Mao Zeodong pressuring Ho to side with them left Ho in a precious position. At the same time, the Buddhist crisis had caused a rift in the once warm relations between President John F. Kennedy of the United States and Diem, with Kennedy pressuring Diem to disallow his younger brother and right-hand man, Ngô Đình Nhu.

On 24 April 1963, Maneli reported to Warsaw after meeting Goburdhun: "Today Ambassador [Ramchundur] Goburdhun left for India. He again reminded [me] that he would visit Ambassador Przemysław Ogrodziński...They [the Indians] consider Diem, his brother [Ngo Dinh Nhu], and sister-in-law, Madame Nhu, to be the main elements [which] strive to make the Americans withdraw. c) They are against the American-English conception of removing them from power by means of a possible coup, because they do not want an official government run by a military junta. d) [Jawaharlal] Nehru supposedly agreed to a wide political amnesty due to the Indian advice. The policy of so-called “open arms” has already been proclaimed towards the insurgents who resigned from the fight"

In a meeting in Hanoi, Ho told Goburdhun that Diem was "in his own way a patriot", noting that Diem had opposed French rule over Vietnam, and ended the meeting saying that the next time he met Diem "shake hands with him for me". In May 1963, Ho publicly posted a ceasefire with the only condition being the withdrawal of all the American advisers from South Vietnam. In a meeting in Hanoi, the North Vietnamese Premier Phạm Văn Đồng told Maneli that his government was prepared to accept a federation and would drop its demand for the National Liberation Front, the 'Viet Cong', to enter the government in Saigon as part of the price for peace. Reflecting the problems imposed by the drought in North Vietnam, Đồng told Maneli that he was willing to accept a ceasefire which would be followed up by a barter trade with coal from North Vietnam being exchanged for rice from South Vietnam. Maneli later wrote that he had the impression that the North Vietnamese were still angry with the outcome of the Geneva conference in 1954, believing that the Soviet Union and China had imposed an unfavorable settlement on them for the sake of better relations with the West. He felt that Đồng did not want the Soviets, the Chinese or the Americans involved in any new talks.

In Saigon, Goburdhun renewed his friendship with Nhu, and uniquely was able to maintain a friendship with Nhu's abrasive wife, Madame Nhu. Accordingly to one of Nhu's bodyguards, he saw at a dinner hosted by Goburdhun, Nhu talking to an unknown man with an "intellectual" demeanor and whose chest pocket had on it a yellow star on a red background, the symbol of North Vietnam. The fact that this account first appeared in a book published in 1971 in Saigon, How Does One Kill a President?, co-written by Dr. Trần Kim Tuyến, the spymaster under the Ngo brothers who had fallen out with them in 1963, has led many historians to dismiss this account.

However, regardless if Goburdhun did set up a meeting between Nhu and a North Vietnamese official, on 25 August 1963 he arranged for Nhu to meet Maneli at a reception at the Gia Long Palace. Goburdhun together with Lalouette formed a semi-circle who edged Maneli towards Nhu, who agreed to meet Maneli on 2 September. Through Goburdhun, Lalouette and Maneli all believed there was a chance for peace, the coup of 1–2 November 1963 that saw the Ngo brothers killed put an end to their plans.

== Later life ==
After leaving the ICC, Goburdhun served as the Indian ambassador to Algeria from 1964 to 1966. From 1967 to 1969, he served as the Indian ambassador to Turkey. From 1970 to his retirement in 1985, he worked as a legal adviser to the Supreme Court of India in New Delhi. An Indian nationalist, Goburdhun's favorite advice to his children was "Don't lose faith in India!", contending that the problems of poverty in India would be one day solved.

== Books and articles ==
- Bakshi, Anouradha (2008). Dear Popples. Bombay: Undercover Utopia Publishing. ISBN 978-0979811654.
- Hammer, Ellen (1987). A Death in November: America in Vietnam, 1963. New York: E.P. Dutton. ISBN 0525242104..
- Jacobs, Seth (2006). Cold War Mandarin: Ngo Dinh Diem and the Origins of America's War in Vietnam, 1950–1963. Lantham: Rowman & Littlefield. ISBN 0742573958..
- Jones, Howard (2003). Death of a Generation: How the Assassinations of Diem and JFK Prolonged the Vietnam War. Oxford: Oxford University Press. ISBN 0198021976.
- Langguth, A. J. (2000). Our Vietnam: The War 1954-1975. New York: Simon and Schuster. ISBN 0743212444.
- Lawrence, Mark (2004). ""The Limits of Peacemaking: India and the Vietnam War, 1962-1968". In Lloyd C. Gardner; Ted Gittinger (eds.). The Search for Peace in Vietnam, 1964-1968. Austin: Texas A&M University Press. pp. 231–267. ISBN 1585443425..
- Maneli, Mieczysław (March 2005). ""Secret Telegram from Maneli (Saigon) to Spasowski (Warsaw) [Ciphergram No. 5295]," April 24, 1963" (Document). Translated by Margaret Gnoinska. History and Public Policy Program Digital Archive, AMSZ, Warsaw, 6/77, w-102, t-625: Cold War International History Project.
- McLaughlin, Sean (2019). JFK and de Gaulle: How America and France Failed in Vietnam, 1961-1963. Lexington: University Press of Kentucky. ISBN 978-0813177762.
- McMath, James (15 October 2017). "Ken Burns, JFK and the unopened door". Arkansas Democrat-Gazette.
- Miller, Edward (2013). Misalliance: Ngo Dinh Diem, the United States, and the Fate of South Vietnam. Cambridge: Cambridge: Harvard University Press. ISBN 978-0674072985.
- Preston, Andrew (2004). "Missions Impossible: Canadian Secret Diplomacy and the Quest for Peace in Vietnam". In Lloyd C. Gardner; Ted Gittinger (eds.). The Search for Peace in Vietnam, 1964-1968. Austin: Texas A&M University Press. pp. 117–143. ISBN 1585443425..
- Schmidt, Dana Adams (1952). Anatomy of a Satellite. New York: Little, Brown and Company.
- "Supplement to the London Gazette" (PDF). 1 January 1943. p. 20..
