= William N. Oatis =

American journalist (1914–1997)

- Oatis in 1953
- Born: William Nathan Oatis; January 4, 1914; Marion, Indiana
- Died: September 16, 1997 (aged 83); Brooklyn, New York
- Occupation: Associated Press bureau chief in Prague
- Notable credit(s): George Polk Award (1952); President, UN Correspondents Association, (1970); Indiana Journalism Hall of Fame (1992)
- Spouse: Laurabelle Zack Oatis
- Children: Jonathan Oatis, Jeremy Oatis

William Nathan Oatis (January 4, 1914 – September 16, 1997) was an American journalist who gained international attention when he was charged with espionage by the communist Czechoslovakia in 1951. He was subsequently jailed until 1953.

== Early life ==
Born in Marion, Indiana, Oatis began his journalism career with his high school newspaper, studied at DePauw University for one year and in 1933 returned to Marion, where he worked for the Leader-Tribune. In 1937, he started working for the Associated Press in Indianapolis, Indiana.

Oatis served in the U.S. Army during World War II, studying Japanese at the University of Minnesota in Minneapolis. In 1950, he married Laurabelle Zack, who worked in the AP's reference library in New York. The marriage took place in London.

== Arrest and detention ==
Oatis was working as the AP bureau chief in Prague, Czechoslovakia, when he was arrested on April 23, 1951. Deprived of sleep and subjected to continuous interrogation for 42 hours, Oatis signed a statement confessing to the charge of espionage. The case made international headlines, as well as leading to trade and travel embargos against Czechoslovakia. During his trial, he confessed to espionage on behalf of the United States, and somewhat more implausibly, on behalf of India, saying he collected intelligence on Czechoslovakia for the Indian charge d'affairs in Prague, Ramchundur Goburdhun. Those attending the trial noted when delivering his confession that Oatis spoke in a flat, emotionless voice.

On July 4, 1951, a Czechoslovak court sentenced Oatis to ten years in prison. He was released May 16, 1953, shortly after the death of Joseph Stalin and after an angry letter from President Dwight D. Eisenhower to the Czechoslovak government. The Czechoslovak government said it had been moved to pardon Oatis by a poignant plea from Oatis' wife, Laurabelle. Oatis contracted tuberculosis during his imprisonment and sought treatment shortly after his release. After his release, Oatis retracted his confession, and maintained that he merely cross-checked information with foreign diplomats such as his friend Goburdhun before writing a story.

A Czechoslovak court cleared him of all charges in 1959, but the decision was reversed in 1968 after the Warsaw Pact invasion of Czechoslovakia. In 1990, after Czechoslovakia's "Velvet Revolution" the previous year, he was cleared again.

External images
- William Oatis steps off plane with his wife Laurabelle in New York after his release in 1953. Life photo by Yale Joel.
- William and Laurabelle Oatis meet reporters in New York after his release in 1953. Life photo by Yale Joel.
- William Oatis interviewing Audrey Hepburn, 1953.
- William Oatis at the United Nations.

== Later career ==
Oatis went on to cover the United Nations for three decades and retired in 1984 after a 47-year career at the AP. He was elected president of the United Nations Correspondents Association in 1970. In 1992, Oatis was inducted into the Indiana Journalism Hall of Fame.

== Death ==
Oatis died September 16, 1997, at Long Island College Hospital in Brooklyn, New York, from complications of Alzheimer's disease. He was survived by his sons Jonathan and Jeremy. His wife Laurabelle died of natural causes on June 19, 2012, at the age of 88.

== Books ==
- Schmidt, Dana Adams (1952). Anatomy of a Satellite. New York: Little, Brown and Comp.
