= Mieczysław Maneli =

Polish diplomat and academic (1922–1994)

- Maneli in 1981

Commissioner of the International Control Commission for Vietnam
- In office 1963 – 1965; Serving with Ramchundur Goburdhun and J. Blair Seaborn
- Preceded by: Leon Romaniecki
- Succeeded by: Janusz Lewandowski

Personal details
- Born: Moshe Meir Manela; 22 January 1922 Miechów, Second Polish Republic
- Died: 9 April 1994 (aged 72) New York, New York, United States
- Party: Polish Workers' Party (1945–1948); Polish United Workers' Party (1948–1968)
- Spouse(s): Zofia K. Maneli, Stephane Silvers
- Children: 2
- Education: University of Warsaw
- Occupation: Diplomat, jurist and philosopher

Military service
- Allegiance: Provisional Government of the Republic of Poland
- Branch/service: Jewish resistance; Polish People's Army
- Battles/wars: World War II; Warsaw Ghetto Uprising
- Writing career
- Years active: 1940–1994
- Notable works: The War of the Vanished (1971), Juridical Positivism and Human Rights (1981), Freedom and Democracy (1984), Perelman's New Rhetoric as Philosophy and Methodology for the Next Century (1994)

Mieczysław Maneli (born Moshe Meir Manela; 22 January 1922 – 9 April 1994) was a Polish lawyer, diplomat and academic best remembered for his work with the International Control Commission (ICC) during the Vietnam War, especially the 1963 "Maneli Affair". During the Holocaust, he survived the Auschwitz death camp, and then became after the war a prominent academic in Poland, serving as the Dean of Law at University of Warsaw.

The term "Maneli affair" is used by historians because the initiative first became known to the public on 18 September 1963 when it was revealed by the American columnist Joseph Alsop that Maneli had twice met Ngô Đình Nhu, the younger brother and right-hand man of President Ngô Đình Diệm of South Vietnam. The name "Maneli Affair", a proposal to end the Vietnam War by creating a federation of the two Vietnams that would be neutral in the Cold War is a misnomer as the proposal was actually a diplomatic initiative made by the French President Charles de Gaulle. Maneli later revealed more about the 1963 peace initiative in his 1971 memoir The War of the Vanished.

After the "March Events" of 1968, he was dismissed from his post as the Dean of Law at the University of Warsaw in July 1968 as part of the "anti-Zionist" campaign, causing him to go into exile in the United States. In his exile in New York, where he taught at Queens College, Maneli was the author of many books, such as Juridical Positivism and Human Rights, Freedom and Democracy and Perelman's New Rhetoric as Philosophy and Methodology for the Next Century dealing with the philosophical basis of a democratic society.

== Early life ==
Maneli was born into an assimilated middle-class Jewish family in Miechów and, unlike many other Polish Jews under the Second Republic, grew up speaking Polish rather than Yiddish. He was generally known to his friends as Mietic rather than as Mieczysław. Maneli's values were shaped by his youth in a left-leaning middle-class family who believed in the values of tolerance and democracy.

== Fighting the Nazis and surviving the Holocaust ==
Under the German occupation, Maneli lived at first in the Warsaw Ghetto. In 1942, while living in the Ghetto, Maneli joined a resistance group linked to the Polish Workers' Party. By the fall of 1942, Maneli's parents and nearly his entire family had been deported to the Treblinka extermination camp and murdered.

In April–May 1943, he fought in the Warsaw Ghetto Uprising, and after his capture by the SS in May 1943, was put on a train taking him to Treblinka. Maneli escaped from the train, but was recaptured by the SS in May 1943. The resourceful Maneli was able to escape a second time. Maneli attempted to join the Home Army, but was refused. Later in May 1943, he was arrested by the SS for a third time, taken to the Umschlagplatz and deported to Auschwitz, where he was worked as a slave laborer building weapons for the Wehrmacht. While at Auschwitz, Maneli joined the Workers' Party.

As the Red Army advanced into Silesia in January 1945, the Germans forced the remaining inmates at Auschwitz into death marches to the Reich while preparing to execute the rest. Believing that he might be executed at any moment, Maneli escaped from Auschwitz. After escaping, he joined the Polish People's Army and fought against Nazi Germany until the end of the war.

By his own admission, an intense "Polish patriot", he believed that after all the carnage and suffering of World War II that a new society needed to be built on the ruins of the old that would be more just and humane. Maneli felt in the immediate post-1945 that the new regime in Poland offered the best avenue for achieving these goals. Maneli later explained his turn toward Communism as a reaction to the Holocaust, arguing the "Final Solution to the Jewish Question" revealed deep flaws within the cultural edifice known as "Western civilization", making a return to the values of the pre-war era unacceptable for him.

== Post-War activities ==
After the Second World War, he joined the Polish United Workers' Party formed in 1948, studied law and economics and worked as an assistant to a philosophy professor, Czesław Nowinski. In 1949, he was awarded a Master of Arts in Economics and the Law. In 1950, he was made an assistant professor at the University of Warsaw and received his Doctor of Law degree in 1954. He married a woman named Zofia, by whom he had two children, a daughter in 1950 and a son in 1954. Described as an easy-going and pleasant lawyer, Maneli made friends very easily. Maneli became the Dean of Law at the University of Warsaw.

Despite his promotion, Maneli was criticized by the Stalinist leadership of the United Workers' Party as a "revisionist" who was sympathetic to "bourgeois liberalism", as a recurring theme of his writings was the need to respect human dignity and promote happiness, a message that implicitly criticized the party's policies. However, Maneli remained a Marxist all through the 1950s, and his implicit criticism of the Stalinist regime was grounded in the objection that the regime was failing to live up to the ideals of Marxism rather than being based on a rejection of Marxism.

== ICC: 1st tour ==
From 1954 to 1955 Maneli served as the legal adviser to the Polish delegation of the International Control Commission (ICC). The ICC was established in 1954 to monitor compliance with the Geneva Accords. The ICC comprised three delegations: from India, Poland and Canada, with the Indian commissioner always being the ICC Chief Commissioner.

Maneli later stated he had expected to be told to favor North Vietnam, but that in reality, a Soviet diplomat had told him "to behave as if we were neutral" because of "the historical need ... for peaceful coexistence", saying it had cost the Soviet Union a fortune in weapons to arm the Viet Minh during their struggle against the French, money that the Soviets would have preferred to spend on their own reconstruction, as vast areas of the Soviet Union were still devastated by World War Two. The Soviets stated that their interests were for peace in Vietnam, not more war.

A major issue for the ICC in 1954 and 1955 was the exodus of Vietnamese Catholics from North Vietnam to South Vietnam that eventually totaled 2 million people. The North Vietnamese officials were unhappy about losing so much of their population to South Vietnam, but the ICC, pressed by the Canadian delegation, ruled in favor of allowing people the freedom to relocate, should they wish.

Maneli wrote that the orders for the Polish delegation were to co-operate with the Canadians against the Indians in allowing the refugees to emigrate, on the grounds that the voluntary clearance of most of North Vietnam's Catholic population would eliminate the most likely source of future unrest and opposition to the Communist government. The Poles also persuaded the North Vietnamese that a violation of the freedom of movement provisions of the Accords could be used by the South as an excuse to cancel the elections, scheduled for 1956, that were intended to reunite the two administrations.

Maneli later wrote about his time on the ICC: "In this period of my work with my Indian and Canadian colleagues, I was struck by their loyal cooperation. It was a period when most of the cases were against the Southern authorities; whenever there was justifiable suspicion that the Southern authorities were treating their citizens in an inhumane manner, the Canadian delegates never hesitated in condemning the crimes. I always considered this to be extremely significant." Indeed, in its early years, the ICC had a measure of success, as neither regime wished to be seen violating the Geneva Accords, whilst the three ICC delegations made conscientious efforts to co-operate with one another.

By contrast, by the late 1950s the decision-making fell into predictable Cold War patterns, with the Polish delegation favoring North Vietnam, while the Canadian delegation favored South Vietnam, leaving the Indian delegation as the ultimate arbiter. The change in relations came in 1956, when South Vietnam announced that it would not hold the elections planned for that July, claiming that the French did not have the right to sign the Geneva Accords on behalf of the State of Vietnam in 1954.

== Jurist ==
Under the Communist regime, Maneli was considered to be a sort of quasi-dissident, a "liberal Marxist" who supported the aims if not the methods of the regime. In 1956, Maneli supported the Polish October revolution that saw the nationalist faction of the United Workers' Party led by Władysław Gomułka overthrow the Stalinist leadership in Warsaw over the objections of the Soviet Union. At a dramatic meeting in Warsaw at the party's politburo attended by Nikita Khrushchev, who had arrived unannounced to attend the meeting, Gomułka was able to persuade Khrushchev to accept his formula of a "Polish Road to Socialism" in exchange for which Poland would remain an ally of the Soviet Union. Maneli later remembered the "Polish October" as being almost an emancipation as it became possible within the party to doubt Soviet infallibility without having to worry about accusations of high treason. Though Poland remained a Communist dictatorship, after the "Polish October" of 1956 there was a greater freedom of expression, though not complete freedom.

In his article "On Tolerance" published in July 1956 in the youth magazine Po Prostu, he wrote:

"To compel someone by force to change his ideas or to hide something in which he truly believes-this is contradictory to the most fundamental human feelings which have been formed and developed over the course of centuries....
Every act of intolerance, every physical or moral persecution of those who think differently, results in demoralization of society and brings about hypocrisy".

For running articles calling for freedom of expression, Po Prostu was banned in 1957, through Maneli was allowed to retain his position as Dean of Law at Warsaw University.

Maneli's lectures, calling for the rule of law for everyone and for the meaningful practice of the theoretical freedom of expression guaranteed by the constitution, made him popular with the students, but unpopular with the authorities. One of Maneli's friends was the Foreign Minister Adam Rapacki, who shielded him against reprisals for his lectures. Rapacki represented the more liberal side of the Polish Communist Party, in opposition to the "partisan" faction, under the Interior Minister General Mieczysław Moczar.

Between 1954 and 1968, Maneli wrote the 6 volumes of The History of Political and Judicial Doctrines, for which he was twice awarded the top prizes for scholarship by the Minister of Higher Education. At the University of Warsaw, Maneli founded the new department of the History of Political and Judicial Doctrines, of which he became the first chairman.

In 1957, as one of Poland's leading Asia experts, Maneli visited the People's Republic of China (PRC). There he met Mao Zedong, together with a group of Polish diplomats, to discuss Chinese aid to Poland. After the Polish October 1956, Władysław Gomułka had become the leader of Poland. Gomułka was a Communist, but a Polish nationalist who had been imprisoned in 1951 for being insufficiently deferential to the Soviet Union. Gomułka was known for favoring a more independent role for Poland, speaking of the "Polish Road to Socialism". Mao, in turn, was looking to challenge Nikita Khrushchev for the leadership of the Communist world, and invited a Polish delegation to Beijing to discuss a Sino-Polish alliance, with the promise of aid as bait. When one of the Polish visitors complained about the low living standards in Poland, Mao replied: "I do not believe the standard of living in Poland is too low. On the contrary, I feel it is relatively high; the Poles are eating two or three thousand calories every day while about 1,500 could be sufficient. If the people feel that there are too few consumer goods available, then the regime should increase their propaganda efforts". After listening to Mao's monologue, Maneli wrote the Polish visitors "realized that Chinese assistance could not be substantial or long-lasting because their program was even more 'anti-people' than the Soviet one".

Maneli described Gomułka as incapable to appreciate the full extent of the Sino-Soviet split, being unwilling to accept that Communist nations would struggle against one another for influence. Maneli described General Moczar as having infiltrated agents into the bureaucracy whose purpose was to ensure that information that Moczar wanted Gomułka to have reached him while blocking other information. He also accused Moczar of seeking to undermine Rapacki at every turn, trying to prevent him from nominating his choices to serve as ambassadors abroad. Maneli depicted his appointment as the Polish commissioner to the ICC in part as a result of the Moczar-Rapacki power struggle and in part an attempt by his patron Rapacki to get him out of Warsaw, as his lectures were bothering Moczar. From 1958 to 1968, Maneli served as the co-chairman of the European Juridical Commission to Prosecute Nazi Jurists.

== ICC: Polish Commissioner ==
In 1963–65, Maneli returned to Vietnam to serve as the Polish Commissioner, the head of the Polish delegation to the ICC. As a member of the ICC, Maneli was allowed to go anywhere he wanted in the two Vietnams and to meet the leaders of both governments. With his fluent French, Maneli was able to converse with Vietnamese elites on both sides of the 17th parallel as French was widely spoken by elites in both the North and the South. A British diplomat who knew him in Saigon described Maneli as "civilized, humorous, a social democrat and a humanist".

After China defeated India in the 1962 war, Maneli observed the outcome of the war completely changed the view of his Indian colleagues towards China. Maneli recalled how the Indians on the ICC "could not talk about China without emotional engagement, without spitting out invective against a faithless friend. Since 1961-62, whatever happened at the Commission was interpreted through the prism of their hostility towards China". Likewise, when Maneli visited Beijing to meet Premier Zhou Enlai in 1963, he struck by how Zhou "spoke about the Indians with anger, contempt, and disdain".

In early 1963, he arrived in Hanoi to meet Ho Chi Minh and other North Vietnamese leaders, who were keenly interested in the signs of a growing split between President Ngô Đình Diệm of South Vietnam, together with his younger brother and right-hand man Ngô Đình Nhu on the one hand, and South Vietnam's patron, President John F. Kennedy of the United States, on the other, later recalling how eager they were for more information about the tensions between the two presidents. Maneli also remembered that Ho had told him: "Our real enemies are the Americans. Get rid of them, and we can cope with Diem and Nhu afterward".

Maneli was basically sympathetic towards North Vietnam and admired Ho as the Communist revolutionary who had defeated the French, but he disliked and distrusted Mao. Maneli generally tried to push the North Vietnamese away from Chinese influence, which he felt to be baleful. The North Vietnamese leaders told him in frank detail about the Ho Minh Chi Trail that they been constructing through neutral Laos and Cambodia to supply their forces in South Vietnam, saying "Indochina is just one single entity".

At about same that Maneli had arrived in Vietnam, his patron Rapacki had visited India, where he discussed Vietnam with the economist John Kenneth Galbraith, who served as the American ambassador to India and got on well with the Indian prime minister, Jawaharlal Nehru. Galbraith was opposed to Kennedy's Vietnam policy and quietly encouraged Nehru to act as an honest broker during the peace initiatives.

Galbraith spoke frankly about his "despair" about President Kennedy's Vietnam policies and his wish to have the two Vietnams made neutral along the same lines as an agreement had reached to make Laos neutral in 1962. The peace plan that Galbraith and Nehru formulated called for a ceasefire and a coalition government in Saigon. When Galbraith broached the subject with Kennedy, he recalled that the latter told him "to pursue the subject immediately".

On 5 February 1963, Jerzy Michałowski, the director-general of the Polish foreign ministry, cabled Przemysław Ogrodziński, the Polish ambassador in New Delhi: "As far as the Vietnam matter, we are discussing it. It was received with interest. Deliberations will continue. As for now, we suggest inviting Galbraith to lunch and sounding [him] out, without committing ourselves, in order for him to see that we are looking into this matter".

Ramchundur Goburdhun, the Indian Chief Commissioner, shared Nehru's belief in neutralism and enlisted Maneli in his diplomatic efforts, on the grounds that Maneli was greatly more acceptable to Hanoi than were the other members of the ICC. In March 1963, Maneli reported to Warsaw: "It would be desirable for the North and the guerrillas to give Diem some respite. Then, as Diem promised Goburdhun, he would get rid of the Americans by himself and would join the India line. It would be necessary to facilitate direct North-South contacts. This could take place in [New] Delhi, where the two sides have their representatives."

At the same time, the French President Charles de Gaulle had launched a diplomatic initiative to make South Vietnam neutral in the Cold War as a way of forestalling American intervention. Maneli worked closely with the French Ambassador to South Vietnam, Roger Lalouette, on the neutralisation plan. Maneli reported to Warsaw that the reasons for the French plan were the fact that Vietnam, a former French colony, was a place that the French no longer had any influence in, a matter that had greatly dented de Gaulle's very considerable ego. De Gaulle seemed to believe that if his plan for the two Vietnams to be neutral in the Cold War were adopted, French influence in both territories could be restored.

Also assisting Lalouette were the Indian Chief Commissioner Goburdhun and the Italian ambassador to South Vietnam, Giovanni d'Orlandi. Lalouette, Goburdhun, and d'Orlandi tried repeatedly to negotiate a meeting between Nhu and Maneli. Nhu repeatedly declined, believing that for him to meet Maneli would be one step too far for his American patrons.

In a report he sent to Warsaw on 5 May 1963, Maneli analysed the motives of Lalouette, Goburdhun, and d'Orlandi. He reported that Goburdhum regarded President Diem as a model Asian leader and was trying to convert him to neutralism, the official Indian creed during the Cold War. Regarding d'Orlandi, he was: "the most reticent of the three. Italy had no particular interests in Vietnam, outside of the general Western hope of maintaining a reasonable balance of power in Southeast Asia and of making decisions in a more thoughtful and restrained way than was the habit of the impetuous and inexperienced Americans". And as for Lalouette: he "had even more reason for arranging and watching over [Maneli's] future relations with Nhu...His stakes in the game were incomparably more higher and more portentous as he wanted to open a dialogue between Saigon and Hanoi and then token cultural and economic exchanges between the two regions. In this way, the ground would be laid for political talks. Tension, suspicion, and enmity between the two governments would disappear and peace would be assured".

Lalouette argued for a division of labor: he himself would handle the talks in Saigon with the Ngo family, while Maneli should handle Ho and the other North Vietnamese leaders. Maneli reported to Warsaw that the relations between the United States and South Vietnam were steadily declining and Diem wished to be rid of the "reckless Americans". The French could not afford to support South Vietnam to the same extent as the Americans had and Maneli noted: "Thus, they advise this mistress to change her style of living to a less extravagant one: to make peace with the North and the National Liberation Front. The next step will be neutralization, not under the direction of India, but rather Charles de Gaulle. In this way, Vietnam, in addition to neutral Cambodia and Laos will again become a pearl in the grandeur de France". He called the French plan "one of the most boldest plans in twentieth-century politics". A few days, on 8 May 1963, there occurred the Huế Phật Đản shootings when the South Vietnamese police fired into a crowd in Hue peacefully celebrating the Buddhist holiday of Vesak, marking the beginning of the Buddhist crisis.

Lalouette met with the Ngo brothers, who seemed interested, and armed with this information, Maneli left Saigon for Hanoi to meet the North Vietnamese Premier Phạm Văn Đồng. The French plan called for a ceasefire together with cultural and economic exchanges between the two Vietnams with the final political status to be settled later after some years of peace, possibly as a federation. Maneli noted that conditions for an agreement were favorable as in 1963 North Vietnam had just suffered its worst drought in a generation while, by contrast, rice production was booming in the fertile Mekong River delta, giving Ho an initiative to improve relations with South Vietnam.

The fact that Meneli could report that Lalouette had told him that Nhu was willing to export rice from South Vietnam was considered very significant in North Vietnam. From 1956 to 1958, President Diem refused successive North Vietnamese offers to allow economic relations between the two Vietnams, and his offer to export rice was seen as a sign of change in heart in Saigon.

Furthermore, Maneli noted that the Sino-Soviet split had placed North Vietnam in a difficult position, as both Moscow and Beijing demanded that North Vietnam side with them, placing Ho, who was trying to be neutral in the quarrel between the two Communists giants, in an uncomfortable position. Đồng told Maneli he was interested, saying that just as long as the American advisers left South Vietnam "we can come to an agreement with any Vietnamese". When Maneli reminded Đồng that Kennedy would withdraw the American advisers from South Vietnam if it was done in a manner that would "save face", Đồng replied that "the Poles would surely find some intelligent formula" to do this.

Đồng also stated that his government was prepared to accept a federation and would drop its demand for the National Liberation Front, the 'Viet Cong', to enter the government in Saigon as part of the price for peace. Reflecting the problems imposed by the drought in North Vietnam, Đồng told Maneli that he was willing to accept a ceasefire which would be followed up by a barter trade with coal from North Vietnam being exchanged for rice from South Vietnam. Đồng told Maneli that Diem could "prove his good faith" by allowing the export of rice to North Vietnam.

Maneli later wrote that he had the impression that the North Vietnamese were still angry with the outcome of the Geneva conference in 1954, believing that the Soviet Union and China had imposed an unfavorable settlement on them for the sake of better relations with the West. He felt that Đồng did not want the Soviets, the Chinese, or the Americans involved in any new talks.

At the end of May 1963, Ho, who normally disliked talking to Westerners, granted an interview with the Australian Communist journalist Wilfred Burchett. Ho told Burchett he was willing to consider a ceasefire with South Vietnam, and dropped his standard demand for the overthrow of Diem, implying he might be allowed to stay in office as part of a peace deal. In The War of the Vanished, Maneli wrote that neither Ho nor Đồng was keen on allowing Diem to stay in power, but he pressed them to make that concession, saying it was the best way forward to peace.

A potential obstacle emerged when Zhu Qiwen, the Chinese ambassador to North Vietnam, objected furiously to the peace plan, telling Maneli that his government believed that North Vietnam should be redoubling its effort to overthrow Diem, especially given the Buddhist crisis, instead of negotiating with him. However, Maneli also knew that despite all the onward displays of Sino-North Vietnamese friendship that there was a deep distrust and fear of China in Hanoi, and at least some members of the North Vietnamese Politburo were afraid of Mao Zedong's hopes that he could "bleed" the Americans in Vietnam.

Vietnam had been conquered by China in 111 BC and with a few interruptions had remained a Chinese province for the next thousand years. Even after Vietnam regained its independence in 980 AD, the Chinese had repeatedly attempted to reconquer their lost province over the thousand years with the last attempt being made in 1788–1789. As a consequence, the Vietnamese tended to see China much as the Poles viewed Russia and Germany, namely as a more powerful neighbor that was inclined to push them around. Given the distrust and fear of China in Hanoi, Maneli felt paradoxically that the Chinese opposition to the peace plan might actually make the North Vietnamese more inclined to accept it.

During a debate with Zhu, Maneli stated: "Diem and Nhu, fearing a coup inspired by the Americans, are switching their police and military forces for a defense against the Americans instead of the National Liberation Front...Should not the socialist forces, in this new political situation, seek new methods and solutions?"

In June 1963, Đồng told Menali that the 1962 agreement to neutralize Laos did not reflect the "real distribution of power" in Laos, but Hanoi had agreed to it to "show good will" and to prove that "the Western powers can and must talk to us". Maneli, unlike the other members of the ICC, was aware of the split within the Politburo: between the "North first" faction, who favored focusing on the economic development of North Vietnam, and the "South first" faction, who favored a guerrilla war in South Vietnam to reunite Vietnam in the near future.

The two factions roughly corresponded to the Sino-Soviet split. The Soviets encouraged the North Vietnamese to focus on economic development to achieve the sort of Utopian society envisioned by Karl Marx, which they claimed would lead to South Vietnam peacefully joining North Vietnam sometime within the next 25 years, whereas the Chinese argued that the immediate priority should be a revolutionary guerrilla war to reunite Vietnam within the next five or ten years.

Lê Duẩn, who was from South Vietnam and, like most of the other southern Communists who went to North Vietnam after the Geneva Accords, particularly resented the partition of Vietnam, was the First Secretary of the Communist Party. He became an increasingly powerful personality within the Politburo given the ill-health of Ho.

Lê Duẩn was the leader of the "South first" faction whose ardor for war had been greatly encouraged by the victories of the Viet Cong, who were steadily taking control of the rural areas of South Vietnam. Lê Duẩn saw no reason why North Vietnam should settle for a federation when unification under Hanoi appeared achievable in the near future. Supporting Lê Duẩn as members of the "South first" faction were Lê Đức Thọ, the chief of the Vietnamese Party's Organisation Department, and Nguyễn Chí Thanh, chief of the Political Department in the People's Army of Vietnam.

Some of Lê Duẩn's colleagues on the Politburo were, however, fearful of provoking American intervention and favored accepting the peace plan Maneli had presented. Ho himself was worried about the possibility of the United States intervening, which would lead to a long and bloody war. Like other members of the "North first" faction, Ho was concerned about the possibility that the United States would bomb North Vietnam the same way it previously bombed North Korea and Japan, inflicting massive devastation and loss of life.

There was sufficient support for the peace plan that Lê did not dare oppose it outright and went through the motions of least considering it, which seems to have given Maneli an inflated idea of the possibilities of the plan's acceptance. As Rapacki had ordered Maneli not to become involved in the ceasefire negotiations, he was initially hesitant to do so, but changed his mind in July 1963 when he became convinced that there was a real chance for peace in Vietnam.

On 25 August 1963, Maneli was introduced at a diplomatic reception to the American ambassador Henry Cabot Lodge Jr., whom he found to be an insufferable snob. Speaking in French, Lodge asked Maneli what was the time difference between Warsaw and Saigon, and then answered his own question with the remark "Who cares?" Lodge then walked away from Maneli to talk to other guests.

At the same reception, Maneli first met Nhu. Lalouette, Goburdhun, d'Orlandi, and the Vatican ambassador Monsignor Salvatore d’Astata formed a semi-circle and edged Menali towards Nhu. After being introduced, Nhu told Maneli that he heard much about him from Lalouette, d'Orlandi, and Goburdhun and that, except for France, Poland was the foreign nation that the Vietnamese knew the most about. Nhu argued that the Vietnamese and Poles shared a natural affinity because that they had both spent centuries fighting for their independence against more powerful neighbors, Russia and Germany in the case of Poland and China in the case of Vietnam. After going on for some length about the natural friendship between Poles and Vietnamese, Nhu invited Maneli for a private meeting.

Later the same night, Maneli visited the French embassy, where Lalouette warned him that the scheduled meeting would never take place because Lodge had organized the coup for the same night. Lalouette was misinformed about the timing of the coup, but he was correct that Lodge was in contact with certain South Vietnamese Army generals who were planning a coup. In his report to Warsaw sent on 30 August, Maneli did not mention that Monsignor d’Astata was one of the men who introduced him to Nhu, but he writes of Nhu's "ostentatious kindness".

On 2 September 1963, Lalouette took Maneli with him to meet Nhu at his office at the Gia Long Palace. Maneli described Nhu's office as hopelessly cluttered with books, documents, and newspapers. Nhu sounded interested in the peace plan and his wife Madame Nhu stated she was willing to send two of her children to Hanoi to serve as hostages as a "fraternal gesture". Nhu spoke to Maneli in French in a mystical and dreamy tone, claiming he was waging a spiritual crusade to save his nation and that as a Catholic his real enemy was not Communism, but rather "dialectical materialism" of which capitalism was the most dangerous expression.

Nhu claimed that what he wanted was an alignment of Catholicism with Marxism, saying he envisioned the "withering away of the state" that Marx had predicted, and this was the real purpose of his Strategic Hamlets policy, which had created so much controversy. Starting in 1962, the South Vietnamese state had started to forcibly relocate the entire rural population of South Vietnam to Strategic Hamlets that were officially supposed to protect the peasants from the Viet Cong guerrillas, but many described the Strategic Hamlets as almost like concentration camps that were intended to enforce government rule over a recalcitrant peasantry. Nhu claimed that his own officials and the Americans had misunderstood the purposes of the Strategic Hamlets, which he maintained were to bring spirituality to the peasantry and one day the Strategic Hamlets would be the basis of a "direct democracy" that would lead to the "withering away of the state" that Marx had envisioned, causing a surprised Maneli to ask to did he really mean what he had just said. Nhu repeated the remark and added "The sense of my life is to work so that I can become unnecessary". Maneli left the meeting not entirely certain whether Nhu was sane, but felt that was at least some hope for peace as Nhu seemed to have some interest in the peace plan.

However, Nhu met Lodge the same day that he met Maneli and rejected any contact with Communist nations, saying his loyalty was only to the United States. Shortly afterward, Nhu leaked the news of the meeting to the conservative American columnist Joseph Alsop in an attempt to blackmail Kennedy into increasing American support with the threat the Ngo brothers would reach an understanding with the Communists if the U.S. government continued to criticize their handling of the Buddhist crisis. Alsop, one of the most influential American columnists of his time, visited Saigon, and on 18 September 1963 published a column entitled "Very Ugly Stuff" in his "A Matter of Fact" column in The Washington Post detailing the Maneli-Nhu meeting.

The version of events leaked to Alsop was deliberately unflattering to Maneli, as Nhu claimed he had "begged" him for a ceasefire. Alsop's version had Maneli as a cringing, desperate figure and Nhu as a defiant figure, resolutely rejecting any appeal from Communist nations out of fidelity towards the alliance with the United States. Alsop's column concluded, "the facts all too clearly point to a French intrigue...to defeat American policy [in South Vietnam]." Nhu told Alsop that the offer presented by Maneli was "almost an attractive offer", but he rejected because "I could not open negotiations behind the backs of the Americans...That was of course out of the question".

Tran Van Dinh, an aide to Nhu, later stated in an interview on 27 October 1967 that Maneli had brought with him a letter from an important person in North Vietnam, which he gave to Nhu. In 1974, a member of the Central Committee of the Workers' Party in an interview stated that person was Ho.

Maneli had acted outside of his duties as an ICC member in trying to arrange a ceasefire and violated his instructions from Warsaw, so a result of Alsop's column he found himself in much trouble with his superiors. Even Maneli's patron and protector Rapacki warned him if he continued to stray from his instructions and kept embarrassing Poland that even he would not able to protect him any longer. On Rapacki's orders, Maneli published a formal démenti denial claiming the meeting with Nhu at the Gia Long Palace had never taken place. Just before he published démenti, he summoned the American journalists Neil Sheehan and David Halberstam for dinner and, as Sheehan recalled: "Maneli wanted us to write a démenti that he had been involved in any intrigue between Nhu and Hanoi". Maneli later said of Nhu: "He was playing on many instruments at the same time".

Maneli met the American journalist David Halberstam, the Vietnam correspondent for The New York Times, at the Cercle Sportif, Saigon's most exclusive sports club. After hearing Halberstam speak with much anger about the attempts of the American embassy to silence him for his reporting, Maneli wrote to Đồng saying that North Vietnam should grant Halberstam together with Neil Sheehan visas to report from North Vietnam. By this point, a struggle had broken out in the American media, with the Alsop brothers, Marguerite Higgins and Henry Luce all championing the Diem regime, while journalists such as Halberstam and Sheehan were hostile to Diem. Đồng wrote back, refusing under the grounds that "We are not interested in building up the prestige of American journalists". Maneli suspected the real reasons was because he had heard General Võ Nguyên Giáp, North Vietnam's powerful Defense Minister, say that the Americans were more inept at fighting against guerrillas than the French had been and unlike the French were slower to learn from their mistakes, leading to conclude that the North Vietnamese were afraid that Halberstam and Sheehan might pass on information that might assist the American government.

Uncertain if the Ngo brothers were serious or not, Maneli had some difficulty seeing Đồng again, but he reported after finally meeting him that he was willing to work with the French plan. By the time Maneli had returned to Saigon, the Ngo brothers were dead, killed during the coup d'état on 2 November 1963. The overthrow and assassination of the Ngo brothers led to a period of political instability in South Vietnam as the junta that replaced Diem was torn by infighting and with it a precipitous decline in the fighting power of the South Vietnamese Army, as the generals of the junta were more interested in fighting each other than the Viet Cong.

At a meeting of the plenum of the Politburo in December 1963, Lê' Duẩn's "South first" faction triumphed with the Politburo passing a resolution calling for North Vietnam to complete the overthrow of the regime in Saigon as soon as possible while most of the members of the "North first" faction were dismissed. The same resolution also marked the nadir of Soviet influence in North Vietnam with the Politburo passing a resolution endorsing Mao's theory of "revolutionary war" as the correct model for North Vietnam, while dismissing Khrushchev's "peaceful co-existence" theory as bad Marxism. Maneli observed at official functions how the Soviet ambassador in Hanoi, Suren Tovmasyan, was snubbed by Đồng, who refused to shake his hand or even acknowledge his presence. Maneli later wrote that Tovmasyan was "a caged tiger. He was helpless because he could not 'teach' these goddamned Vietnamese the way his colleagues in the 1940s and 1950s did in Warsaw, Prague, Budapest, and Sofia. He had lost his 'freedom' and 'dignity' because in Hanoi he was a 'paper tiger'".

There is much historiographical disagreement about the "Maneli affair", as the peace plan of 1963 is known. Some historians such as Fredrik Logevall and Ellen Hammer argue that the United States by rejecting the Franco-Italo-Indo-Polish peace plan threw away an opportunity for peace that would have spared America the trauma of the Vietnam War. Other historians such as Margaret Gnoinska, Mark Moyer, and Pierre Asselin argue that the apparent interest of the Ngo brothers in the peace plan was just a means to blackmail the United States, arguing that Diem would never had accepted a federation that would have been dominated by the more populous North Vietnam while having to compete against "Uncle Ho", a more popular figure than him.

== Philosopher in exile ==
After the Six-Day War of 1967, Maneli was ordered to sign a petition criticizing Israel, which he refused, thus leading to charges that he was a "Zionist". In July 1968, Maneli was fired from as the Dean of Law as part of the "anti-Zionist" campaign and fled to the United States. The reasoning for sacking Maneli besides for his alleged "Zionism" (his refusal to condemn Israel's post-1967 occupation) concerned his "anti-socialist ideas and lectures". Maneli later noted that the same Minister of Higher Education who sacked him had earlier awarded him prizes for his scholarship. From his exile in the United States, Maneli tended to be critical of the Communist regime: an essay he wrote in 1971, published in Dissent, was entitled "From Gomulka to Gierek: The Moral Decay of the Polish Bureaucracy".

In the US, Maneli became Professor of Law and Political Science at the Queens College, part of the City University of New York. At Queens, he became Chairman of the Council For the Study of Ethics and Public Policy. In 1984, he published Freedom and Tolerance, a book examining the philosophical basis of an inclusive, pluralistic democratic society. Maneli was critical of efforts to impose censorship in the name of protecting American values, writing in Freedom and Tolerance: "Wherever there is a loophole in the existing laws protecting traditional American liberties, the opponents of these freedoms try to squeeze in. Whenever legislators create the slightest opening to allow some kind of censorship, the censors will be born and will march again".

Greatly influenced by the New rhetorics theories of Chaïm Perelman, he sought to advance legal theories that would serve as the basis of a humanist social order. In his last book, Perelman's New Rhetoric as Philosophy and Methodology for the Next Century, published a month after his death in April 1994, Maneli wrote: "The New Rhetoric is modern humanism. The struggle for humanism never ends. The most essential features to a humanistic approach to life are: individuals should be given the chance to develop their personal talents and energies, they should be able to be creative and become happy...Their essence and value is creativity and self-determination...Once the New Rhetoric took as its basic proposition that nothing is absolutely good or sacred except human dignity, one must constantly search for new values, for better forms, and ways of life. There are three specific area that are especially important for modern humanism: social and individual justice, freedom from oppression with a genuine opportunity for a decent life; and tolerance and privacy".

Maneli did not define humanism by one attribute, but instead chose the theme of human dignity and how best to obtain it. He argued: "The philosophy and methodology of Perelman are instruments, which can help elaborate new ways of thinking and acting, new critical approaches to every social, political and judicial institution, be they in the east or the west. The traditional divisions of left and right, of progress and justice, of human rights and privacy, of state sovereignty and internal autonomy, must be revised extensively. Today the New Rhetoric is the most consistent method of searching for new approaches".

Maneli argued that to understand Perelman required an understanding of being both Polish and Jewish. Maneli wrote that there were two currents to Polish history, writing in the Middle Ages "...while Jews were being massacred all over Europe...Poland was a haven of peace and hospitality under the dynasties of the Piasts, the Jagiellons, and their successors" while the other current was a darker, anti-Semitic one that saw Polish Jews as people who could never truly be Polish and who did not belong in Poland. Maneli wrote that in the Second Republic era, Perelman was confronted in Poland with "a backward and undemocratic state that was also a country where many nationalities lived together and where creative liberal thought and art flourished...The strange and unbalanced conditions there, nevertheless, were a source and inspiration for the Poles and the Jews. Their love-hate affair was at once stimulating and numbing. This gifted Belgian [Perelman], influenced by this atmosphere, was destined to create something innovative".

The American scholar James Crosswhite observed that there was a fundamentally optimistic quality to Maneli's writings in exile as he wrote about Perelman that he "was able to transform all the disadvantages of his origin and his background to powerful advantages and to a source of inspiration". Crosswhite wrote: "...Maneli is not simply a traditional liberal. His liberalism is of a specifically postcommunist sort, formulated out of a Polish context and complicated by his exile in New York City".

Maneli argued that after the Holocaust, what was needed was a humanist philosophy that would create a truly "human community". He defined his humanism as: "Individuals should be given the chance to develop their personal talents and energies, they should be able to be creative and to become happy". Crosswhite wrote that Maneli had used the "hermeneutic of hope" as he sought to turn Perelman's "New Rhetoric" into a legal and historical philosophy.

Maneli argued that the basis of the moral authority of the law was the process by which laws are made. A process that was just provided the moral authority for the law. He wrote that people may use various arguments such as natural law, the popular will, theology, etc., but only the process provides the moral authority, which in turn was grounded in legal positivism. Maneli argued that legal positivism grew out of the resistance to legal dogmatism and the development of democratic societies.

Maneli used as examples of legal positivism documents such as the United Nations' Charter, the Universal Declaration of Human Rights, the constitutions of democratic nations and laws against racism. Maneli argued that there were no "self-evident principles of substantive law", and maintained that only laws that emerged from just processes were legitimate. He wrote that processes in which the people participated in the making of laws were the just processes. Maneli argued that the what made for just processes were historically contingent as differing environments and changing views would determine what processes were just, but argued for the modern era, the "New Rhetoric" as advanced by Pereleman provided the best basis for determining a just process. Crosswhite wrote that for Maneli "...rhetoric is not simply a consciously applied form of communication. Rather, it is the form of our being human, the form of our social dignity as human beings, and the form of occurrence of justice and the law".

Maneli wrote his legal positivism was also a form of legal realism. Maneli argued that legal system was the accumulation of historical changes to make society more just, which caused him to reject both legal nominalism and legal conventionism Maneli's concept of legal realism did not involve some timeless sense of what makes for just law, but rather, he argued, reflected the present when "the law pervades the life of nations to an incomparably greater degree than in the past, when the norms of international law and morality are...permeating deeper and deeper into everyday life, when states of various political and social structure co-exist on this globe and cooperate despite their basic differences and antagonisms". Within this modern context, Maneli argued that new laws "are being expounded as something living and can be enriched or impoverished by new requirements of life". As such, he wrote legal realism provided "a fruitful promise for the future" and supplied the "instruments of cooperation". For Maneli, the law as it existed today was the result of what happened or did not happen in history, and the purpose of the law was to promote human happiness and dignity, which was determined by the processes over history that made the law what it was in the present.

Aware that objections could be made to his theory that history provided more examples of unjust laws or even just laws that not administered justly, Maneli developed a defense. Maneli wrote that to understand history "one must impose an interpretation...but what measures do we use to determine what is more or less important?" Maneli argued that to produce a history "fruitful for the future" required examining what laws did the most to promote human dignity, happiness, freedom, creativity, and justice over the course of the ages. Maneli argued for the power of precedent, arguing that the law had been grounded in the past, but at the same time, when citing precedents that they must be connected to the concerns of the present.

In this regard, Maneli felt that there were three principal challenges for the West in the post-Cold War era, namely helping the transition of the states of Eastern Europe from Communism to democracy; the transition of the new nations of the Third World to just political and social orders; and the need for the West to accept the "meaningfulness" of ideological conflict and end the "authoritarian consumerism".

Maneli acknowledged that Perelman's "New Rhetoric" did not seem to be the basis of social order as it only provided a theory for how to resolve conflicts without actually saying what a society should look like after the resolution of social conflicts, while a social philosophy had to project such a vision of the future. In response, he wrote: "However, in our time, once such values as human rights, respect for legality, freedom from hunger and religious oppression, are uncontestable human values acknowledged even by international and municipal law, then we must agree the situation has changed dramatically. Today the problem is how to preserve, secure and enhance these values" in a world where they continue to be under attack.

Perelman observed that values such as freedom and justice were widely accepted, with even states such as the Soviet Union and China claiming to be uphold these values, writing that no-one was against freedom and justice as long as they were "abstract values". Maneli argued that freedom and justice were not just "abstract values", but had been realized in principle in the form of various legal systems and especially in international law. For Maneli, a Polish Jew who survived the Holocaust, the "Final Solution" disproved the notion of timeless, universal values, arguing that the genocide he survived was not some "freakish aberration" from the norms of the West, and the world, especially the West, needed to change its values to prevent the reoccurrence of genocide. Maneli rejected the theory of a natural law that was always just, and instead argued that people had to decide which laws did the best to promote human happiness and dignity, which could only be achieved a process of continuous argumentation.

Maneli argued that argumentation was an "infinitely progressive process" without end as societies were constantly changing in their values about what constituted human dignity. As such, Maneli admitted that his philosophy based upon changing values was somewhat weak compared to other philosophers who had written about what made for a just society, but he argued that this weakness was in fact a strength as it provided room for the ambiguity and doubt that he felt were the best defense against extremism and fanaticism that led to totalitarianism. Maneli argued in a society he envisioned: "The New Rhetoric may be the only philosophy that praises those who ruminate, hesitate, are reluctant, doubtful, but ultimately able to act prudently". For him, the heroes he wanted to see were the "people who are more critical than ever before and at the same time more tolerant in their beliefs and cooperation".

Maneli was deeply committed to his humanist project, writing that history was neither automatically progress nor retrogression, but was decided by the actions of people, thus making the struggle for humanism an endless battle. He argued that a truly just society would be one willing to accept moral pluralism and the necessity for compromise between social groups. Maneli wrote towards the Perelman's "New Rhetoric: "We are sure that the development of democracy and the culture of society and its involvement in the process of argumentation and counter-argumentation can create a climate where a return to despotism is impossible. Nevertheless, there are no guarantees". Crosswhite praised Maneli for turning Perelman's philosophy into a philosophy of history, especially legal history, and a political philosophy. Crosswhite argued that Maneli had created a philosophy of "dynamic humanism" where "human dignity is always at stake, always in question, always generating new historical and political and ethical demands".

Maneli was a member of the American Humanist Association, serving on the board of directors from 1985 onward. He died of a heart attack in New York in 1994. He was survived by two children, Lester and Elizabeth and by his companion, Stephane Silvers.

== Publications ==
- Historia doktryn polityczno-prawnych : starożytność, Warsaw : University of Warsaw Press, 1961.
- Historia doktryn polityczno-prawnych. Średniowiecze: tomizm, herezje, ruchy plebejskie Warszawa : Warsaw : University of Warsaw Press, 1959
- Historia doktryn polityczno-prawnych. T. 2, Czasy nowożytne wiek XVI-XVII Warsaw : University of Warsaw Press, 1968
- Historia doktryn polityczno-prawnych : wiek XIX-XX. Cz. 1, Kant - Hegel Warsaw : University of Warsaw Press, 1962
- Historia doktryn polityczno-prawnych : wiek XIX-XX. Cz. 2, Liberalizm, pozytywizm, szkoły: psychologiczna i socjologiczna Warsaw : University of Warsaw Press, 1964.
- Historia doktryn polityczno-prawnych : wiek XVI-XVIII. Cz. 2, Bacon-Winstanley Warsaw : University of Warsaw Press, 1960.
- Historia doktryn polityczno-prawnych XIX wieku. Cz. 1 Warsaw : Państwowe Wydawnictwo Naukowe, 1964
- Historia doktryn polityczno-prawnych XIX wieku. Cz. 2 Warsaw : Państwowe Wydawnictwo Naukowe, 1966
- O funkcjach państwa Warszawa : Państwowe Wydawnictwo Naukowe, 1963
- Sztuka polityki Warszawa : "Iskry", 1967
- "From Gomulka to Gierek: The Moral Decay of the Polish Bureaucracy" pages 230-234 from Dissent, June 1971.
- War of the Vanquished, translated from the Polish by Maria de Görgey New York : Harper&Row, 1971.
- Juridical Positivism and Human Rights. New York: Hippocrene Books, Inc., 1981

== Sources ==
- Asselin, Pierre (2015). Hanoi's Road to the Vietnam War, 1954-1965. Los Angeles: University of California Press. ISBN 978-0520287495..
- Bothwell, Robert (Winter 2000–2001). "The Further Shore: Canada and Vietnam". International Journal. 56 (1): 89–114. doi:10.1177/002070200105600106. S2CID 142066541.
- Chang, Jung; Halliday, Jon (2005). Mao: The Unknown Story. New York: Alfred Knopf. ISBN 0307807134..
- Brocheux, Pierre (2007). Ho Chi Minh: A Biography. Cambridge: Cambridge University Press. ISBN 978-0521850629.
- Crosswhite, James (2013). Deep Rhetoric: Philosophy, Reason, Violence, Justice, Wisdom. Chicago: University of Chicago Press. ISBN 978-0226016344.
- Dommen, Arthur (2011). "International Commission for Supervision and Control". In Spencer Tucker (ed.). The Encyclopedia of the Vietnam War: A Political, Social, and Military History A Political, Social, and Military History. Santa Monica: ABC-CLIO Books. pp. 536–537. ISBN 978-1851099610..
- Hammer, Ellen (1987). A Death in November: America in Vietnam, 1963. Oxford: Oxford University Press. ISBN 0195206401..
- Hiscocks, Richard (February 1964). "Some Liberal Marxists and Left-Wing Catholics in Contemporary Poland". The Canadian Journal of Economics and Political Science. 30 (1): 12–21. doi:10.2307/139167. JSTOR 139167.
- Gaiduk, Ilya (2003). Confronting Vietnam: Soviet Policy Toward the Indochina Conflict, 1954-1963. Stanford: Stanford University Press. ISBN 0804747121.
- Gnoinska, Margaret (March 2005). "Poland and Vietnam, 1963: New Evidence on Secret Communist Diplomacy and the "Maneli Affair"". Cold War International History Project Working Paper 45: 2–83..
- Jacobs, Seth (2006). Cold War Mandarin: Ngo Dinh Diem and the Origins of America's War in Vietnam, 1950–1963. Lanham: Rowman & Littlefield. ISBN 0742573958..
- Karnow, Stanley (1983). Vietnam: A History. New York: Viking. ISBN 0670746045.
- Langguth, A.J. (2000). Our Vietnam: The War 1954-1975. New York: Simon and Schuster. ISBN 0743212444..
- Logevall, Fredrik (2001). Choosing War: The Lost Chance for Peace and the Escalation of War in Vietnam. Los Angeles: University of California Press. ISBN 0520229193..
- Maneli, Mieczysław (1971). The War of the Vanished: A Polish Diplomat In Vietnam. New York: Harper & Row.
- Maneli, Mieczysław (1984). Freedom and Tolerance. London: Octagon Books. ISBN 0882546309.
- McLaughlin, Sean J. (2019). JFK and de Gaulle: How America and France Failed in Vietnam, 1961-1963. Lexington: University Press of Kentucky. ISBN 978-0813177779..
- Miller, Edward (2013). Misalliance: Ngo Dinh Diem, the United States, and the Fate of South Vietnam. Cambridge: Harvard University Press. ISBN 978-0674072985.
- Nguyen, Lien-Hang T (2012). Hanoi's War: An International History of the War for Peace in Vietnam. Chapel Hill: University of North Carolina Press. ISBN 978-0807882696.
- Porter, Gareth (2005). Perils of Dominance: Imbalance of Power and the Road to War in Vietnam. Los Angeles: University of California Press. ISBN 0520940407.
- Shaw, Geoffrey (2015). The Lost Mandate of Heaven: The American Betrayal of Ngo Dinh Diem, President of Vietnam. San Francisco: -Ignatius Press. ISBN 978-1586179359..
- Thakur, Ramesh (July 1980). "Peacekeeping and Foreign Policy: Canada, India and the International Commission in Vietnam, 1954-1965". British Journal of International Studies. 6 (2): 125–153. doi:10.1017/S0260210500114974. S2CID 156585244.
- Thakur, Ramesh (1984). Peacekeeping in Vietnam: Canada, India, Poland, and the International Commission. Edmonton: University of Alberta Press. ISBN 0888640374.
