= Operation Marigold =

Failed operation in the vietnam war

Marigold was an American codename for a failed secret attempt to reach a compromise solution to the Vietnam War that was carried out by the Polish diplomat Janusz Lewandowski, a member of the International Control Commission, and the Italian ambassador in Saigon, Giovanni D'Orlandi, in collaboration with the US ambassador in Saigon, Henry Cabot Lodge Jr., in late 1966.

In his 2012 book, James Hershberg argues that had not the United States missed the opportunity, direct talks between the United States and North Vietnam could have begun roughly a year and a half before May 1968, when they actually occurred in Paris; the war or at least the massive US direct military involvement in it might have ended sooner; and the number of Americans who perished in the war might not have escalated from 6,250 to over 58,000.

The suspension of bombing of Hanoi by the Americans while Lewandowski's mission was there in late November was interpreted as a subtle hint that the Americans were open to talks. Lewandowski's mediation led to the North Vietnamese and American governments agreeing that a direct meeting would take place between their ambassadors in Warsaw, at which the US ambassador, John A. Gronouski, would confirm that Washington indeed adhered to the positions, known as the "Ten Points", that Lewandowski had conveyed to Hanoi from Lodge. However, efforts were halted when bombing in the Hanoi area resumed for the first time in more than five months, on 2, 4 and 13–14 December. US President Lyndon Johnson had authorized the continued strikes despite warnings from the Poles and then from senior members of his own national security team that any further attacks on Hanoi might cause Marigold to collapse.

After the Poles, evidently reflecting Hanoi's wishes, broke off the initiative on December 14, Johnson belatedly halted bombing within a ten-mile radius of Hanoi's center, but despite Polish urging, the North Vietnamese leadership refused to reconsider its decision to retract its agreement for direct contacts. Polish Foreign Minister Adam Rapacki relayed Hanoi's final rejection to Gronouski on December 30, and Marigold was dead.

The episode was first leaked into public print in a pair of articles by Robert H. Estabrook in The Washington Post in February 1967, and was then the subject of an intense investigation by Los Angeles Times reporters David Kraslow and Stuart H. Loory, who published their findings in The Secret Search for Peace in Vietnam (New York: Random House, 1968). The American side of the affair first emerged in declassified documents included in a lengthy chronology included in the Pentagon Papers' diplomatic volumes, which were not leaked by Daniel Ellsberg but emerged only gradually.

== See also ==
- Italy–Poland relations
