= International Control Commission =

1954–1974 United Nations mission in Vietnam, Laos, and Cambodia

- International Commission for Supervision and Control
- Commission Internationale de Contrôle
- Abbreviation: ICC, CIC
- Successor: International Commission for Control and Supervision
- Formation: 11 August 1954; 72 years ago
- Dissolved: 15 June 1974; 52 years ago (Note: Effectively ceased to exist on 29 January 1973 due to the formation of the International Commission of Control and Supervision.)
- Headquarters: Hanoi (ICSC Vietnam); Vientiane (ICSC Laos); Phnom Penh (ICSC Cambodia)
- Coordinates: 21°01′42″N 105°51′15″E (ICSC Vietnam)

The International Control Commission (abbreviated ICC; French: Commission Internationale de Contrôle, or CIC), was an international force established in 1954. More formally called the International Commission for Supervision and Control, the organisation was actually organised as three separate but interconnected bodies, one for each territory within the former French Indochina: the ICSC for Vietnam (being treated as a single state having two temporary administrations); the ICSC for Laos; and the ICSC for Cambodia.

It oversaw the implementation of the Geneva Accords that ended the First Indochina War and brought about the Partition of Vietnam. It monitored the observance of the ceasefires and noted any violations. The organization consisted of delegations of diplomats and military personnel from: Canada, Poland, and India, representing respectively the non-communist, communist, and non-aligned blocs. The ICC/ICSC started well, but the irreconcilable positions soon told, and the organisation became largely irrelevant in the face of an increasingly-active conflict. Nevertheless, it survived, as a communications link, until the Paris Accords were signed and it was replaced by the International Commission for Control and Supervision.

== History ==
=== Background ===
The International Control Commission was created to apply the Geneva Accords, a treaty signed as part of the removal of Vietnam from the French Empire. However, while both were created in the same treaty, the International Control Commission is distinct from the Joint Commission. It was the duty of the Joint Commission to actually oversee the ceasefire in the region and to ensure the peace, as well as to act as the adjudicator in all issues relating to the peace. It was the duty of the International Control Commission to oversee the region and to ensure that the terms of the treaty are followed. Specifically, the treaty discussed four primary duties of the International Control Commission:

"(a) Control the movement of the armed forces of the two parties, effected within the framework of the regroupment plan.

(b) Supervise the demarcation lines between the re-grouping areas, and also the demilitarized zones.

(c) Control the operations of releasing prisoners of war and civilian internees.

(d) Supervise at ports and airfields as well as along all frontiers of Viet-Nam the execution of the provisions of the agreement on the cessation of hostilities, regulating the introduction into the country of armed forces, military personnel and of all kinds of arms, munitions and war material."

The Agreement gave little actual power to the International Control Commission. However, the lack of governing power was not well known by the public, and the International Control Commission would fall under attack for its perceived lack of leadership in the region when in reality, it was unable to serve the role people expected.

=== Relocation and early peacekeeping (1954–1956) ===
The first action of the International Control Commission, as stipulated by the treaty was to separate the state of Vietnam into two separate zones, one controlled by the People's Army of Vietnam in the North and the other controlled by the French Union in the South. The regions would go on to be colloquially known as North and South Vietnam. As part of the treaty, the division was given 300 days in which to occur and was overseen by the International Control Commission.

The first and likely most important duty of the International Control Commission was the relocation itself. Many people wanted to move, and the manpower and resources that it took were tremendous. In all, 897,149 people were moved from one half of Vietnam to the other, 892,876 from north to south, and 4,269 from south to north. The movement was largely successful, despite feelings on both sides. The largest complaint from the North was that the South was distributing untrue and derogatory propaganda in an attempt to get people to emigrate and in the South that the North was blocking immigration. In total, the deadline was actually extended a full month to allow additional people to travel, despite British, Canadian, and commission pressure to extend it further. While the process is not well remembered and had its share of issues, there is little doubt it was a success.

In addition to the sheer logistical problems of moving the numbers of people, the commission had to worry about the treatment of citizens who would not or could not move. Officially, there was a requirement by the Geneva Agreement that all citizens would be granted "democratic liberties" While there was no official definition as to the meaning of this phrase, it is likely that it refers to Lockean ideals. In this case, however, it more specifically refers to the right to live without fear of government reprisals. However, there were two radically different groups that had been at war for years. That the governments of the regions would be able to guarantee this freedom was unlikely, to say the least. To answer this problem, the International Control Commission created the Freedoms Committee to answer the concerns of anyone who submitted a claim that their democratic liberties had been violated. In total, the committee heard 17,397 cases under the rules over the course of the 300 days of the relocation. While the International Control Commission may have settled the cases, the governments of the respective sides did little to enforce them and most cases were not helped by the International Control Commission. The rest were settled reasonably fairly, and the International Control Commission is well regarded for its work during this period. It may not have been able to help with every case, but it managed to help a lot of people.

According to the original accords, the separation of the regions was to be the end of the International Control Commission. However, members of the commission looked at the country and decided that it was in the best interest of all involved for it to continue. Tensions between the North and the South were running high, and while neither group were very big fans of the International Control Commission, both preferred talking to it than to their counterparts. The Joint Commission disbanded, leaving the International Control Commission in a position where it was unsure of its own powers. The main reason to remain in Vietnam was to ensure that the tenuous peace held. While the commission was there, there was still the hope of its final job being carried out: holding an election. The election to unify Vietnam was to be held two years after the separation attempt to reach a longer peace and to prevent a permanent split between the two sides. However, there was little hope in anyone's mind that the elections would actually happen after the two years of increased tension between the two Vietnams and the international community as a whole. By the time that the election was set to take place, even the International Control Commission was unexcited by the premise. As such, when the proposed date for the elections, July 1956, occurred, there was no surprise when they, in fact, did not happen.

However, the International Control Commission was able to hold the two sides in check for years in a shaky peace that otherwise would have likely descended into conflict almost immediately.

=== Growing difficulties (1956–1973) ===
Despite still existing, the Commission quickly found itself with few friends and fewer powers. It was unable to control much of anything or act as anything beyond a minor speed bump for either side. The states that sat on the commission were secondary powers, at best, never large enough to have a major impact on world affairs during the Cold War, in comparison to the two superpowers. In addition, they were sitting on a fault line between the two major powers that had been fighting not ten years earlier. What had begun as a ceasefire quickly became a battlefield as tensions continued to flair. After the first two years, when the active partitioning ended and the two Vietnamese governments became more and more comfortable in their ability to rule, they also became closer and closer to their respective patrons, the North to the Soviet Union and the South to the United States. That relationship to the larger powers allowed the developing states to take bigger risks and care less and less about the condemnation of the International Control Commission. In addition, when the global superpowers looked to act through the states, the International Control Commission could not respond either, as the international community needed to defer to the superpowers, giving the International Control Commission few ways to influence anything. Without any actual power or backing of the global superpowers, there was little for the International Control Commission to do to enforce their views except complaining to what was quickly becoming an empty room. The commission was expected to police two states and ensure a full peace between the global superpowers, a daunting task for the entire world during the period, let alone a commission. As such, the power of the International Control Commission drained away during this period until it was little more than a figurehead, able to state its opinions but little more in the region.

That was seen most pointedly in arms traffic, which was strictly limited under the terms of the Geneva Agreements. However, after the successful separation and the growth of superpower influence, trafficking became a much more important factor. The means of and the response to the issue is seen in this quote from John Holms:

"...in the North the International Control Commission was unable to observe violations of the arms control stipulation but never able to maintain adequate inspection to be assured that no violations were taking place. In the South, the struggle was with the indifference and reluctance of the authorities and the persistent effort of the Americans to press the terms of the Agreement farther than they could properly be stretched. The violations in the South were, needless to say, observable, and the attitude of the Americans was negative but decent. The Commission was in a position to prove Southern but not Northern violations. The Southerners and Americans inevitably complained and increasingly insisted that the known if not proved disregard of the arms control provisions by the Communists not only justified by made essential their doing likewise."

That difficulty further reduced the impact of the International Control Commission, preventing it from performing its duties, and putting into question its existence. That it could not reach the North was a problem since it was it sworn duty to maintain "democratic liberties" and put a stop to any kind of growing threats to violence. The inability to patrol regularly allowed the North to build whatever it wanted, as there was no threat of the international community stopping it because the ICC has no actual way of enforcing order.

The lack of respect from the North led to it losing the ability to police the South, which is the great tragedy of the region. With the North so far away and difficult to control, any attempt to do its job in the South was met with cries of a double standard. While that was technically true, it showed the inherent issues with the International Control Commission. It was a regulatory board with no ability to regulate the one thing it was supposed to. As such, it drifted further and further into ridicule in the eyes of the world.

Another major and far more tangible difficulty that the International Control Commission ran into was a severe lack of funds. The commission was funded by the various states that composed it, but it was an extremely low priority during the Cold War. As such, donations would frequently be late or simply never arrive. There was a rise in operating expenses as the Joint Commission disbanded and the International Control Commission was forced to take on greater responsibility and the financial straits. That led to further inability to operate and reduced its power in the region.

A third major difficulty the International Control Commission experienced during its operations was a lack of manpower and transportation. For the International Control Commission to function properly as a check on the two Vietnams, it would have to travel throughout the region with impunity to look for signs of growing tension or violations of "democratic liberties" but would have to be able to catch the states unaware. If it was unable to do so, it would be trivial for one of the sides to hide any evidence of misconduct from the International Control Commission. However, money issues made the International Control Commission unable to maintain a fleet of cars to allow it to travel on its own, and the growing distrust between the two states made it more and more dangerous to travel. As such, the only safe way to travel was in government convoys. While that was safer and cheaper for the International Control Commission, it lost that crucial element of surprise. That further reduced its impact in the region and made it even more ephemeral.

By far the biggest blow to the International Control Commission is the growing military presence of the United States during the 1960s that would ultimately escalate into the Vietnam War. The troops and military supplies brought in were in clear defiance of the Geneva Agreements, but the lack of power invested in the International Control Commission meant that it was completely unable to prevent even that. It could do no more than write a sternly worded report on 13 February 1965. It stated that the US had violated the Geneva Agreements and that there were growing conflicts between the two sides.

However, there was no response from the international community and so the power and reputation of the International Control Commission fell further. Despite its growing irrelevance, the International Control Commission attempted to hang on as a moderating voice in the conflict. It made several attempts to bring the two sides closer together and to start a dialogue but its efforts came to naught. That lack of effect was to be endemic of the International Control Commission during the conflict, as it was unable to negotiate peace as the tensions grew into full-blown war and its role became more and more vestigial in the face of regional politics.

Professor Mieczysław Maneli, head of the Polish delegation to the ICC, defected to the United States in 1968.

=== Collapse and dissolution (1972–1973) ===
The International Control Commission did not outlive the Vietnam War. Their fall came from an unlikely source, with India, one of the key member states of the International Control Commission normalizing relations with North but not South Vietnam. That insulted the South Vietnamese and they forced the Indians and, by extension, all of the International Control Commission out of the country. While the Commission tried to function from Hanoi, it became much harder to regulate South Vietnam. That, coupled with the general pointlessness of the institution in the modern world, meant that in March 1973, the International Control Commission formally shut down and was replaced by the International Commission of Control and Supervision (ICCS).

== ICSC for Vietnam ==
Each of the three new states of Indochina had its own Commission, with Vietnam, still being treated as a single state, in temporary partition under two administrations, until the elections of 1956 would enable reunification. The three Commissions replicated the model of three national delegations.

=== Heads of Delegation ===
The head of each of the three delegations, in each of the three Commissions, was styled the Commissioner or, using UN parlance, the Permanent Representative. Canada was assumed to favour the South and Poland was assumed to favour the North, whilst India was viewed as the 'honest broker', and was therefore in permanent command of the commission. The heads of the Indian delegations were automatically the Chief Commissioner of each of the ICSC. For the initial deployment, each civilian Chief Commissioner was assisted by a military deputy, a Major-General, known as the Alternate Delegate.

==== Indian Chief Commissioner ====
- 1954: M. J. (Manilal Jagdish) Desai (1904-)
- 1954: Alternate Delegate: Major-General K. P. Dhargalkar
- 1960: N. Gopala Menon
- 1961: A. S. (Anant) Naravane, MC (1916-)
- 1963: Ramchundur "Ram" Goburdhun
- 1965: M. A. Rahman

==== Canadian Commissioner ====
- 1954-1955: Sherwood Lett, CBE, DSO, MC (1895-1964)
- 1955-1956: David Johnson (1902-1973)
- 1956-1957: Bruce Williams (-2005)
- 1957-1958: Thomas Carter, MC (-2005)
- 1958-1959: Charles Bédard (1924-2013)
- 1959-1960: John Erichsen-Brown
- 1960-1961: Charles Woodsworth (1909-2005)
- 1961-1964: Gordon Cox
- 1964-1965: Blair Seaborn (1924-2019)
- 1965-1966: Victor Moore
- 1966-1968: Ormond Dier
- 1968-1969: Richard Tait
- 1969-1971: Albert Hart [& Laos]
- 1971-1973: Robert Jackson [1972:& Laos]

==== Polish Commissioner ====
- 1954-1955: Przemysław Ogrodzinski (1918-1980)
- 1955-1956: Jerzy Michałowski (1909-1993)
- 1956-1957: Antoni Szymanowski (1914-1985)
- 1957-1959: Władysław Góralski
- 1959-1959: Tadeusz Wiśniewski
- 1960-1963: Leon Romaniecki
- 1963-1964: Mieczyslaw Maneli (1922-1994)
- 1966-1967: Janusz Lewandowski (1931-2013). - Marigold
- 1970-1973: Ludwik Klockowski

=== Head of PAVN Liaison Mission to ICC ===
- 1954-1973: Col. Ha Van Lau (1918-2016)

=== Head of RVN Liaison Mission to ICC ===
- -1961: Col. Hoang Thuy Nam (-1961) - killed on duty

=== Regional Offices ===
==== Northern Vietnam ====
- Hanoi
- Lao Cai
- Dong Dang
- Haiphong
- Vinh
- Dong Hoi

==== Southern Vietnam ====
- Gio Linh
- Tourane
- Qui Nhon
- Nha Trang
- Cap St.Jacques
- Saigon

== ICSC for Laos ==
Each of the three new states of Indochina had its own Commission, with Vietnam, still being treated as a single state, in temporary partition under two administrations, until the elections of 1956 would enable reunification. The three Commissions replicated the model of three national delegations.

=== Heads of Delegation ===
The head of each of the three delegations, in each of the three Commissions, was styled the Commissioner or, using UN parlance, the Permanent Representative. Canada was assumed to favour the South and Poland was assumed to favour the North, whilst India was viewed as the 'honest broker', and was therefore in permanent command of the commission. The heads of the Indian delegations were automatically the Chief Commissioner of each of the ICSC. For the initial deployment, each civilian Chief Commissioner was assisted by a military deputy, a Major-General, known as the Alternate Delegate.

==== Indian Chief Commissioner ====
- 1954-1955: Dr. J. N. (Jagan Nath) Khosla
- 1954: Alternate Delegate: Major-General P. S. (Prem Singh) Gyani
- 1958-1961: ICSC for Laos adjourned
- 1961: Samar Sen
- 1962: Avtar Singh

==== Canadian Commissioner ====
- 1954-1955: Léon Mayrand (1905-1975)
- 1955-1956: Paul Bridle (1914-1988)
- 1956-1957: Peter Campbell
- 1957-1958: William Olivier
- 1958-1961: ICSC for Laos adjourned
- 1961-1962: Léon Mayrand [bis]
- 1962-1964: Paul Bridle [bis]
- 1964-1965: Donald Munro (1916-1998)
- 1965-1966: Keith MacLellan (1920-1998)
- 1966-1969: Percy Cooper
- 1969-1971: Albert Hart [from: (South) Vietnam]
- 1972-1973: Robert Jackson [from: (North) Vietnam]

==== Polish Commissioner ====
- 1955: Dr. Marek Thee (1918–1999)
- 1958-1961: ICSC for Laos adjourned
- 1961: Albert Morski
- 1961-1963: Dr. Marek Thee [bis]

== ICSC for Cambodia ==
Each of the three new states of Indochina had its own Commission, with Vietnam, still being treated as a single state, in temporary partition under two administrations, until the elections of 1956 would enable reunification. The three Commissions replicated the model of three national delegations.

=== Heads of Delegation ===
The head of each of the three delegations, in each of the three Commissions, was styled the Commissioner or, using UN parlance, the Permanent Representative. Canada was assumed to favour the South and Poland was assumed to favour the North, whilst India was viewed as the 'honest broker', and was therefore in permanent command of the commission. The heads of the Indian delegations were automatically the Chief Commissioner of each of the ICSC. For the initial deployment, each civilian Chief Commissioner was assisted by a military deputy, a Major-General, known as the Alternate Delegate.

==== Indian Chief Commissioner ====
- 1954: Gopalaswami Parthasarathi
- 1954: Alternate Delegate: Major-General S. N. (Sarda Nand) Singh (1910-1970)

==== Canadian Commissioner ====
- 1954-1954: Ronald Macdonnell
- 1954-1955: Rudolf Duder
- 1955-1956: Arnold Smith (1915-1994)
- 1956-1957: Acting: Joseph Lavigne
- 1957-1958: Acting: Eric Gilmour
- 1958-1959: Acting Arthur Blanchette (1921-2003)
- 1959-1961: Acting D'Iberville Fortier (1926-2006)
- 1961-1962: Acting Thomas Pope (1930-2017)
- 1963-1965: Acting Jean-Marie Déry
- 1965-1966: Clifford Webster
- 1966-1968: Sinclair Nutting
- 1968-1970: Richard Gorham

==== Polish Commissioner ====
- 1954: Wiktor Grosz (1907-1956)
- 1958: Zygfryd Wolniak (1922-1970)

== Organisation ==
The organisation of the ICSC/ICC/CIC altered considerably over the two decades of its existence. It began, with great expectations, as a large force, covering the whole territory. As conditions on the ground altered, and hopes foundered, the numbers were scaled back considerably and most regional offices closed, until the organisation was reduced mostly to two representative offices, in the respective capitals. This remained largely the case, until the Paris Accords, and the brief revival as the ICCS.

=== Strength ===
Initially, the participant nations were prepared to commit a significant number of diplomats and military personnel to the project. India, as lead-nation, was determined to ensure adequate security measures and from its own very recent history had bitter experience of how fraught the task of Partition and population transfer could be. It deployed a full battalion of infantry, 2nd Bn. the Guards Regiment, as security for the subordinate headquarters and as an operational reserve. In addition, the Indian Army's Corps of Signals established and operated the communications network between the field teams and the headquarters, and linked the capitals, of the three, or rather the four, countries. The following figures probably represent the maximum effort, around 24 March 1955, during the height of population transfer:

- India: 1, 086
- Canada: c.160
- Poland: c.160
- Total: 1, 406

Overall totals are difficult to calculate, due to the long duration of the mission and due to the considerable changes in its duties and organisation during the near two decades of its existence. The Indian military contribution overall has been estimated to be as follows:

- Officers: 970
- SNCOs: 140
- Jawans: 6,157
- Total: 7,267

However, even this figure appears to exclude the Indian civil diplomatic contingent.

The overall figures for Canada and for Poland would appear to be a little under 2,000 each.

In addition to the figures for the formal Delegations, there might be considered the largely-French crews of the ICC/CIC air element; the formal, largely-military, local Liaison Missions to the ICC, and the informal locally employed civilian (LEC) ancillary staff.

== Air transport ==
The ICC/ICSC was authorised to monitor observance of the Geneva Accords anywhere in the former French Indochina (FIC). As such, they were entitled to travel between Hanoi and Saigon for a continuous period of nearly two decades from the early 1950s to the early 1970s, and indeed beyond, under a slightly altered guise. They needed to commute between the two hostile capitals as the Cold War between them, and in the wider world, became considerably more heated. They also needed to travel to the other two capitals: Phnom Penh and Vientiane. No scheduled airline operated such a route: it was neither commercially viable to do so, nor safe to do so, whether in topographical terms or in military terms. The only realistic answer was to charter their own air fleet.

As part of its agreement to pay for its disengagement from Empire in the Far East, France agreed to provide and fund the air-transport for the ICC. The result was a small fleet of three increasingly obsolete aircraft, with French crews. The aircraft were all of the same type, for ease of maintenance & spares: the prewar-vintage Boeing 307 Stratoliner, the first pressurized airliner to enter service.

=== Fixed-wing ===
Although the operator was essentially the same company throughout the two decades, spin-offs and mergers meant the aircraft could be seen, at various times, under several different operator names, and in several different liveries. Aircraft in regular ICC service often kept the livery but dropped the airline name, having CIC inscribed on the stabilizer instead. These included:

- 1954-55?Aigle Azur.
- 1955-61?Aigle Azur Extrême-Orient.
- 1961-63?Union Aéromaritime de Transport (UAT) - Aéromaritime.
- 1963-73?Union de Transports Aériens (UTA).
- 1965-Compagnie Internationale de Transports Civil Aériens (CITCA): the leasing company handling the CIC contract.

The original 3 aircraft were:

- F-BELV (ex-TWA: NC-19905)
- F-BELU (ex-TWA: NC-19906)
- F-BELX (ex-TWA: NC-19907)

=== Rotary-wing ===
In 1962, the Laos Accords declared the neutrality of Laos, and the undercover war that had been waged in the country needed to be scaled back. The ICC/CIC were therefore able to buy up a number of surplus helicopters from operator Air America for their own work in monitoring the new Accords. After the initial purchase of four Sikorsky H-34, an additional two were added the following year. The fleet was in operation for about five years, though some aircraft were apparently still flying in 1969.

The fleet was based in Vientiane and the crews were mostly French, though the former operator remained responsible for the maintenance and some of the former US pilots were apparently also contracted:

- 1962.09: CIC-1: (ex-US 'H-X': 148803, 58.1388).
- 1962.09: CIC-2: (ex-US 'H-Y': 148805, 58.1390).
- 1962.09: CIC-3: (ex-US 'H-Z': 148806, 58.1391).
- 1962.09: CIC-4: (ex-US 'H-11':148807, 58.1392).
- 1963.05: CIC-5: (ex-US 'H-B': 148647, 58.578).
- 1963.06: CIC-6: (ex-US 'H-A': 148644, 58.572).

Attempts to maintain neutrality in Laos were unsuccessful and with the escalation of war-fighting throughout the 1960s, the remaining helicopters were sold back to the former operator, with most being passed on to the Royal Lao Air Force.

== Losses ==
The ICC operated in three, or arguably four, separate but inter-connected war-zones. The field teams made inspections around the four countries of the former French Indochina (FIC), usually well-heralded and with an armed escort from the local military, though this would often negate the value of such inspections. Nevertheless, all three delegations lost personnel as a direct result of their ICC service. The worst single incident was probably the loss of aircraft F-BELV, in the Laos-North Vietnam border area, on 18 October 1965. Some 13 people were lost and, to date, neither aircraft remains, nor bodies have retrieved or even located. The thirteen people comprised the diplomats or military personnel from all three delegations, plus the French crew of the civil aircraft that was on contract to the ICC.

=== Indian delegation ===
- S. L. Bhalla (-1965) 18.10.65: missing, presumed dead: passenger in ICC aircraft F-BELV when lost without trace
- Capt. C. K. Bhattacharjee (-1965) 18.10.65: missing, presumed dead: passenger in ICC aircraft F-BELV when lost without trace
- Lt. Bhola Singh (-1965) 18.10.65: missing, presumed dead: passenger in ICC aircraft F-BELV when lost without trace
- J. Prasad (-1965) 18.10.65: missing, presumed dead: passenger in ICC aircraft F-BELV when lost without trace
- M. R. Ramani (-1965) 18.10.65: missing, presumed dead: passenger in ICC aircraft F-BELV when lost without trace

=== Polish delegation ===
- Mr. Meluch (-1965) 18.10.65: missing, presumed dead: passenger in ICC aircraft F-BELV when lost without trace

=== Canadian delegation ===
- Sgt. J. S. Byrne, CD, RCASC (1929-1965) 18.10.65: missing, presumed dead: passenger in ICC aircraft F-BELV when lost without trace [SB-801786 James Sylvester Byrne, b. Dublin, Irish Free State (IFS) - 1950 enlistment; Korea veteran; of Aylmer, QC]
- John Turner (1935-1965) 18.10.65: missing, presumed dead: passenger in ICC aircraft F-BELV when lost without trace [John Douglas Turner - diplomat, only recently turned 30; of Montreal, QC]
- Cpl. V. J. Perkin, BW(RHC), RCIC (1928-1965) 18.10.65: missing, presumed dead: passenger in ICC aircraft F-BELV when lost without trace [SK-13997 Vernon John Perkin, b. London, ON - 1952 enlistment, Korea peacekeeping; of Regina, SK or Winnipeg, MB (sources vary - SK address might have been service accommodation; father of five)

=== French Crew of F-BELV of CITCA, on contract to ICC ===
- Capt. Henri Domerque (-1965) 18.10.65: missing, presumed dead: pilot of ICC aircraft F-BELV when lost without trace
- Albert Gustin (-1965) 18.10.65: missing, presumed dead: steward in ICC aircraft F-BELV when lost without trace
- Camille Lemee (-1965) 18.10.65: missing, presumed dead: radio-officer of ICC aircraft F-BELV when lost without trace
- Marcel Ropers (-1965) 18.10.65: missing, presumed dead: flight-engineer ICC aircraft F-BELV when lost without trace

== Medal ==
As with other international peacekeeping and monitoring missions, such as the UN, the ICC/ICSC issued a medal to recognise the service of its members in what was becoming an increasingly active war-zone. The medal was issued on standard terms of 90 days service, unless prevented by injury or death in service.

The medal was planned and designed by India; it was produced in Bangalore. India had gained its own independence less than a decade before the formation of the ICC and was the lead-nation of the project, by command and by numbers, and was proud to commemorate its active leadership in of the developing Non-Aligned Movement. When the idea was presented to its colleagues, the reaction was less than ecstatic: Canada was thinking of issuing its own national peacekeeping or general service medal and was therefore hesitant, and Poland was equally non-committal.

The medal ribbon comprises three equal vertical stripes, in green, white and saffron. Some sources suggest 'white and red' represent the colours of Canada and Poland, but examples suggest that, in practice, the stripes reflect the Indian flag alone.

On the obverse of the medal, India is represented by a national symbol, the other two countries by their flags. The Lion of Ashoka thus stands above the crossed flags of Canada and Poland. The dove of peace is superimposed over the crossed flag-poles. The inscription 'International Commission For Supervision And Control' appears around the edge, with the word 'Peace' at the base.

On the reverse is a map of Indochina, with Vietnam shown as a single entity; its name is inscribed in Latin script, but without the Vietnamese diacritics. Unusually, Laos and Cambodia are both marked with their names in their own scripts: Lao script and Cambodian script, almost certainly a unique feature in phaleristics.

One source states that the total number of ICC/ICSC medals issued was '1,550', but this must be a statement taken out of context: as the Indian strength for the first year alone was over one thousand, and troops usually did a tour of about a year, this figure should have been exceeded by eligible Indian soldiers alone before the end of 1956; numbers soon dropped significantly, but still the organisation did remain for almost two decades. The figure quoted above might possibly have related to the number of Canadians eligible.
