= Arthur Frederick Broadbridge =

Canadian diplomat

Arthur Frederick Broadbridge (15 February 1915 – 29 March 2009) was a Canadian diplomat.

Born in Elham, England, Broadbridge's family emigrated to rural Saskatchewan in 1920. In 1932 Broadbridge trained for one year before starting to work as a teacher at Bradgate School, Newpark School and Hillside School in Invermay and Rosetown. In 1941, at the outbreak of the Second World War, Broadbridge enlisted in the Royal Canadian Air Force and was sent to Vancouver to study radar, at the time a secret technology. As a radar officer, he served in England, Africa, Sicily, Naples, Corsica and Florence.

After being demobilized, Broadbridge returned to Saskatoon and married fellow teacher, Mavis Davies, whom he had been courting before the war. As a veteran he received support to attend the University of Saskatchewan where he obtained a Master of Arts degree in history for his thesis titled The History of Rosetown, 1904–1939. He worked briefly as an archivist for the Saskatchewan Archives Board before taking a civil service exam and joining the foreign service in 1949. Broadbridge was posted to Chicago, Washington, D.C., Cairo, and Berlin before being appointed concurrently as High Commissioner to Malawi and Zambia then later as Ambassador Extraordinary and Plenipotentiary to Mozambique. His terms for these posts all ended concurrently.

In 1977 Broadbridge retired from foreign service and returned his family to Canada. His wife, who had been ill, died soon after their return.

In his retirement, Broadbridge published two books: The Church of St. Peter, Cobourg, Ontario, 1867–1978, and a memoir, Early Days.

In 1981 he remarried; his second wife was Ada Uren, an old friend who had recently been widowed. Uren died in 2004 and Broadbridge in 2009.

Diplomatic posts
Preceded by James Rollins Barker	High Commissioner to Zambia; 1973-1976	Succeeded by Victor Campbell Moore
Preceded by Established	High Commissioner to Malawi; 1973-1976	Succeeded by Victor Campbell Moore
Preceded by Established	Ambassador Extraordinary and Plenipotentiary to Mozambique; 1975-1976	Succeeded by Victor Campbell Moore
