= Victor Campbell Moore =

Canadian diplomat (1918–2000)

Victor Campbell Moore (1918–2000) was Canadian diplomat.

Moore's first posting abroad was to Karachi from 1960 to 1962, and then to The Hague until 1965.

From 1965 to 1967, Moore was the Canadian Commissioner of the International Control Commission, during the Vietnam War. Moore negotiated directly with the communist government in Hanoi in an attempt to reconvene the 1954 Geneva Conference. Unfortunately, the effort championed by Moore and Chester Ronning was unsuccessful.

In 1968 Moore was appointed High Commissioner to Jamaica, a post he held until 1972. From 1971 to 1972 he also acted as commissioner to the Bahamas and Belize.

In 1976 and 1977 Moore succeeded Arthur Frederick Broadbridge as High Commissioner to Malawi and Zambia and Ambassador Extraordinary and Plenipotentiary to Mozambique, posts he held until 1979.

Diplomatic posts
| Preceded by Raymond Harry Jay | High Commissioner to Jamaica; 1968-1972 | Succeeded by John Maurice Harrington |
| Preceded by Arthur Frederick Broadbridge | High Commissioner to Malawi; 1977-1979 | Succeeded by Terence Charles Bacon |
| Preceded by Arthur Frederick Broadbridge | Ambassador to Mozambique; 1977-1979 | Succeeded by Terence Charles Bacon |
| Preceded by Arthur Frederick Broadbridge | High Commissioner to Zambia; 1976-1979 | Succeeded by Terence Charles Bacon |
