= Ogrodziński =

Ogrodziński is a Polish surname and may refer to:

- Przemysław Ogrodziński (1918–1980), Polish diplomat
- Piotr Ogrodziński (1951-), Polish diplomat.
- Władysław Ogrodziński (1918–2012), Polish historian
