= Hoshiv =

Hoshiv Гошів
- Village
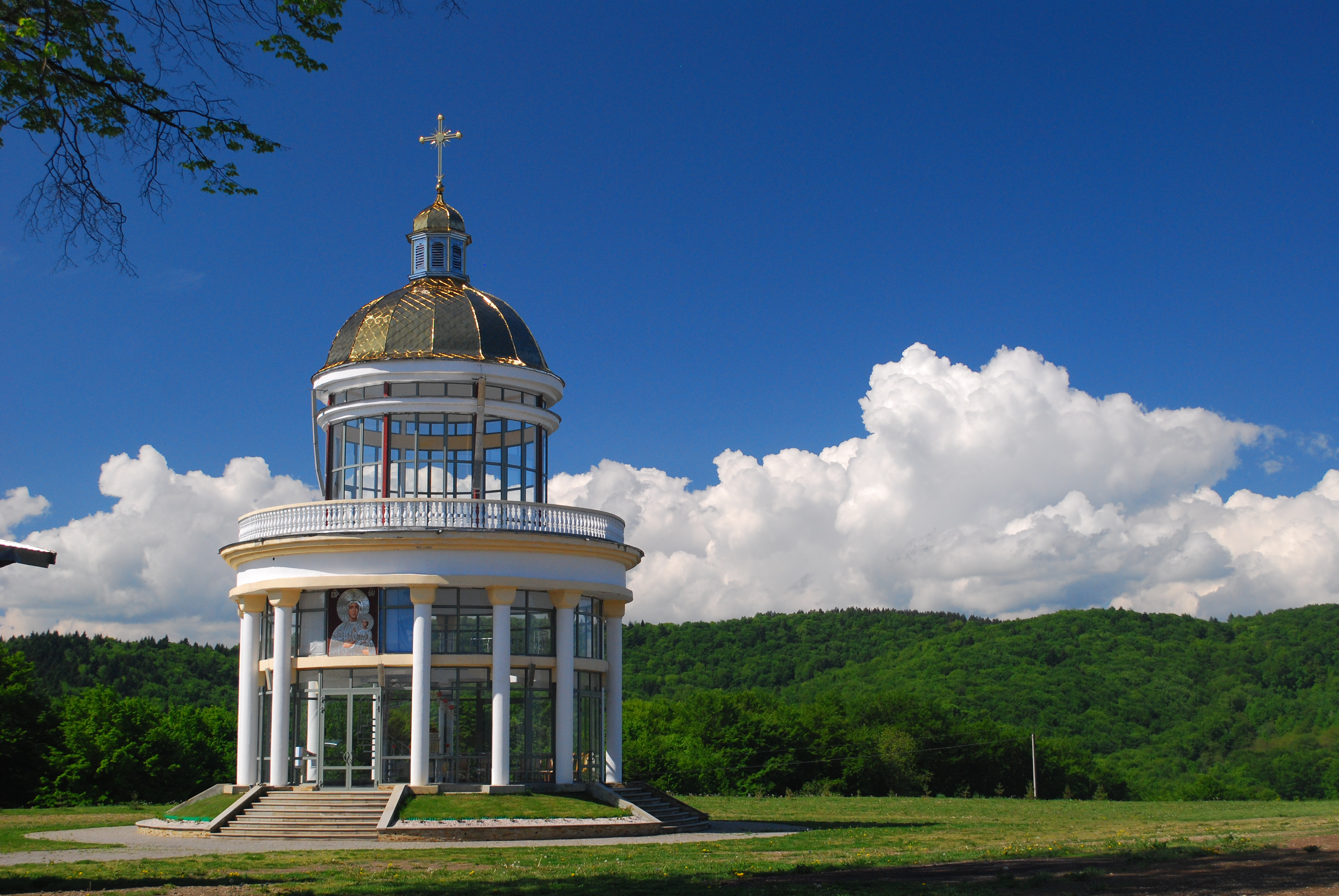
- Rotunda on Yasna Hora in Hoshiv

- Location within Ivano-Frankivsk Oblast Location within Ukraine
- Coordinates: 49°2′5″N 23°53′16″E
- Country: Ukraine
- Oblast: Ivano-Frankivsk Oblast
- Raion: Kalush Raion
- Hromada: Dolyna urban hromada
- Founded: 1464

Area
  - Total: 69.3 km^{2} (26.8 sq mi)
- Elevation: 371 m (1,217 ft)

Population (2001)
  - Total: 1,885
  - Density: 27.2/km^{2} (70.4/sq mi)
- Time zone: UTC+2 (EET)
  - Summer (DST): UTC+3 (EEST)
- Postal code: 77520
- Area code: +380 3477

Hoshiv (Ukrainian: Гошів; Polish: Hoszów) is a village in the Ivano-Frankivsk Oblast of Ukraine, located about 4 km south east of Bolekhiv and 12 km north west of Dolyna. Part of Dolyna urban hromada, the village is known for the Basilian monastery, which is a place of pilgrimage for the Ukrainian Catholic Church.

== Monastery ==
The Monastery of the Transfiguration of the Lord at Hoshiv was established in 1570. In the 17th century it was plundered and destroyed by Tatars and later rebuilt at its present location on top of a hill called Yasna Hora, in homage to the Pauline Monastery of Jasna Góra. The present day monastery buildings and church of the Transfiguration were built at the beginning of the 19th century.

=== Miraculous Icon ===
The history of the miraculous Hoshiv icon of the Mother of God began in 1704–1705, when the nobleman Andriy Shugai visited the city of Oława in Poland. He acquired two copies of the miraculous icon of the Black Madonna of Częstochowa. One copy he gave to his brother-in-law, and the other he kept for himself. One day Shugai’s house caught fire, and everything in it burned except the icon and the wall on which it hung.

Later the icon passed into the ownership of another nobleman, Mykola Markovych Hoshovsky, and his family. A miracle occurred when the icon shone with an otherworldly light, and tears flowed from the eyes of the Mother of God. Eyewitnesses gave a detailed account of what had happened to Bishop Athanasius Szeptycki of Lviv. In his letter of 11 July 1737, Szeptycki recognized the icon as miraculous and ordered Hoshovsky to transfer the icon to Yasna Hora, where the monastery was located in Hoshiv. On 5 August 1737 the icon was solemnly transferred to the monastery. The icon was crowned in 1746. By the end of the 18th century, 117 miracles through the intercession of the Mother of God of Hoshiv had been recorded in the monastic chronicles.

On 1 June 1950 the icon was confiscated by communist officials of the Stanislaviv district. From that time there was no information about the whereabouts of the original miraculous icon.

The monastery was restored with the collapse of the Soviet Union in 1991. The oldest surviving copy of the Hoshiv icon, from the 19th century, was found and handed over to the monastery on 12 July 2001. The solemn transfer of the icon took place on 14 October 2001. Numerous healings and answered prayers were reported as before. 0n 28 August 2009, the icon was solemnly crowned with a new riza that was blessed by Pope Benedict XVI on 1 July 2009.

The monastery is once again a popular destination for pilgrims of the Byzantine Rite in Halychyna.

=== Chicago Shrine ===
An outdoor grotto shrine to Our Lady of Hoshiv is located in Chicago on the grounds of St. Joseph the Betrothed Ukrainian Greek Catholic Church. The altar is sometimes used for outdoor services, such as Pascha Blessing. In 2006, a restoration and relandscaping of the grotto into a memorial garden was done, and the space is now dedicated to deceased parishioners.

=== Saint Peter and Paul Monastery, Mundare ===
After the second half of the 1950s, Fr. Nikon Svirskyi, OSBM, received information that the miraculous icon of Our Lady of Hoshiv was being sold on the black market in New York. He was in Canada and knew this icon very well, since he had grown up in the Hoshiv area. Svirskyi went to New York, bought the icon, and brought it to Ottawa, where the former Basilian house of studies was located. Later, when the house of studies closed, the icon was transferred to Saint Peter and Paul Monastery in Mundare, Alberta.

The miraculous icon is located behind the altar in the monastic chapel. Various studies have been conducted which have established that the icon is indeed a copy of the icon of the Mother of God of Częstochowa dating from the 17th century.

== Gallery ==
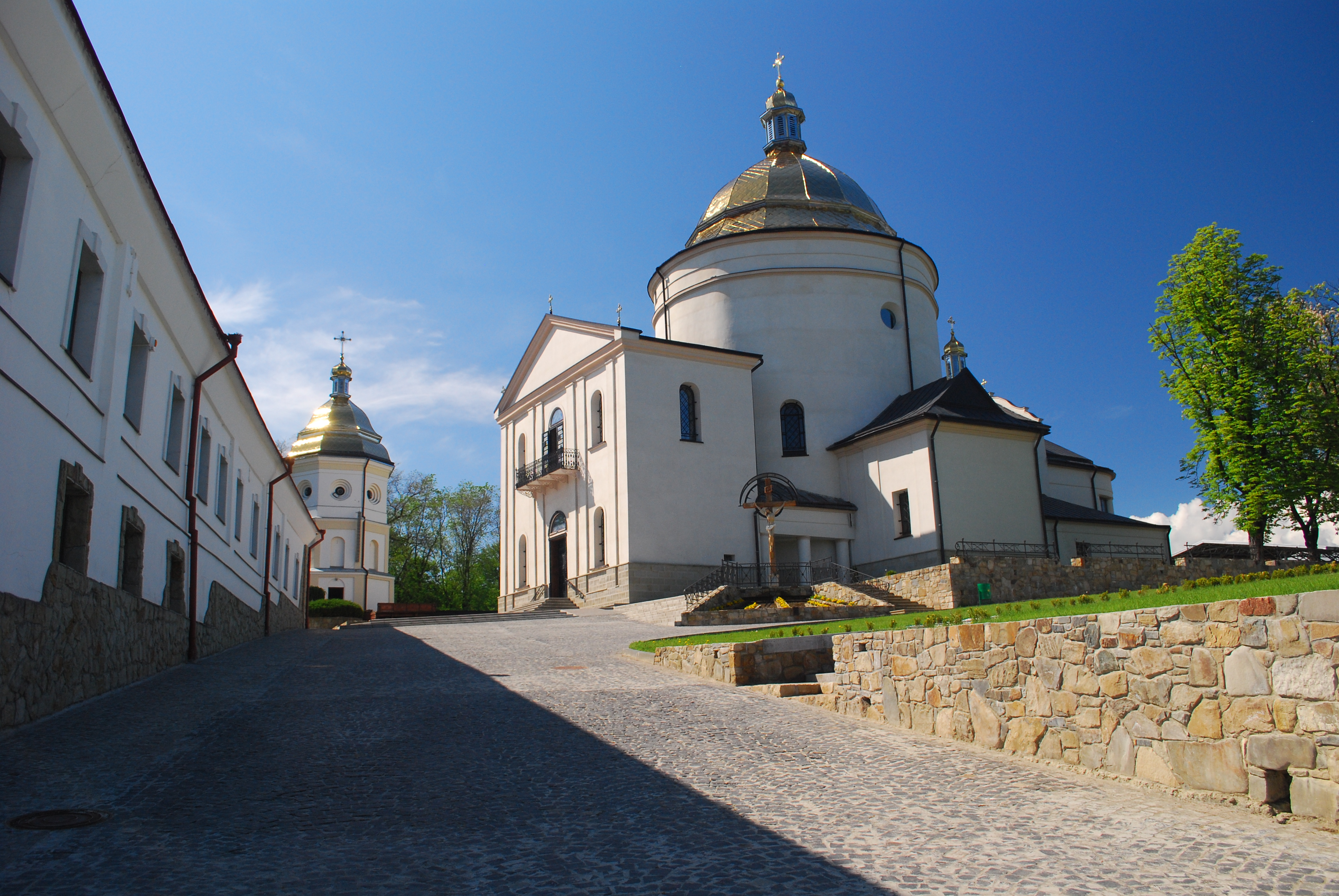
Basilian Monastery complex in Hoshiv

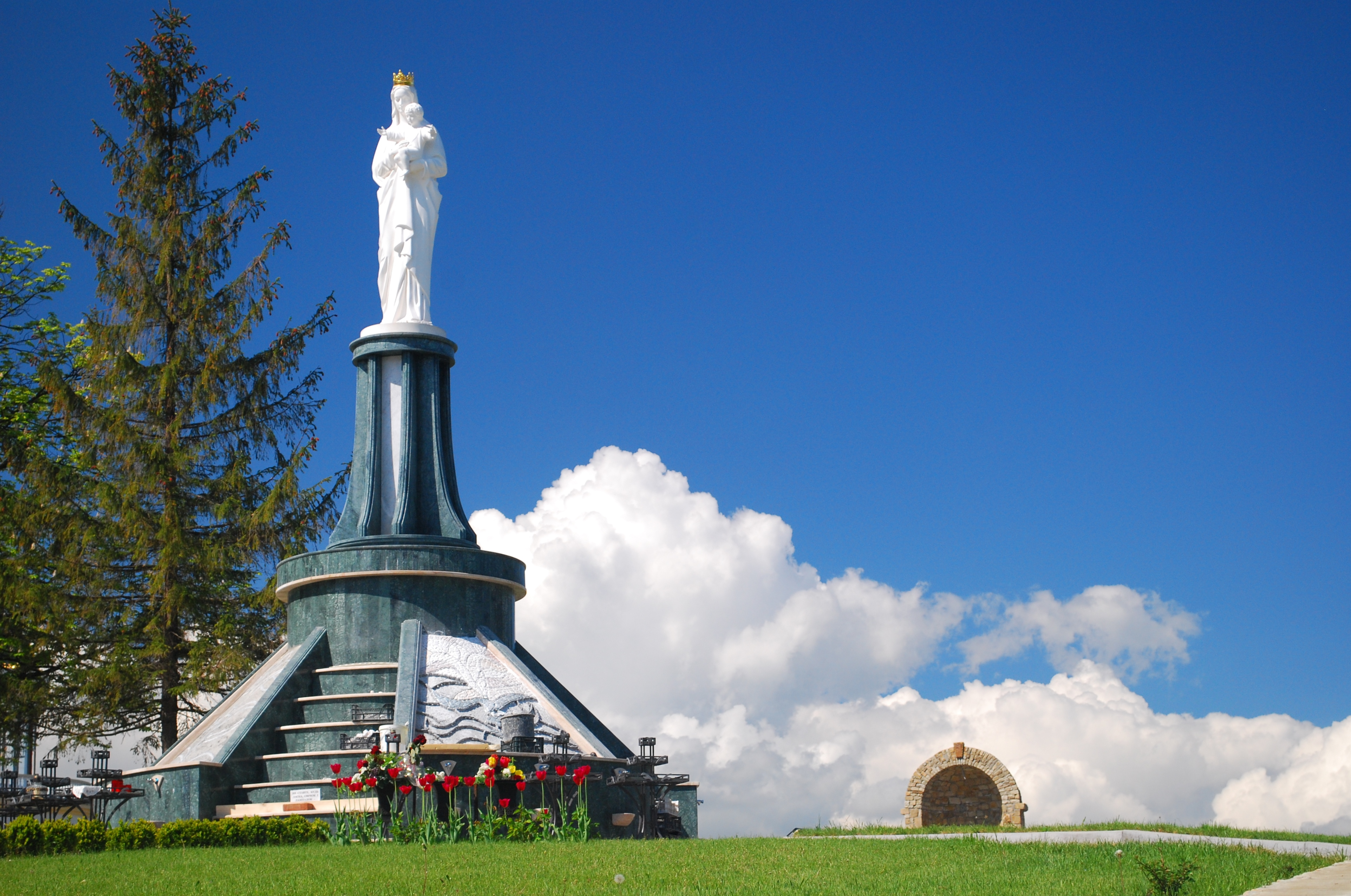
Figure of the Virgin Mary on Yasna Hora

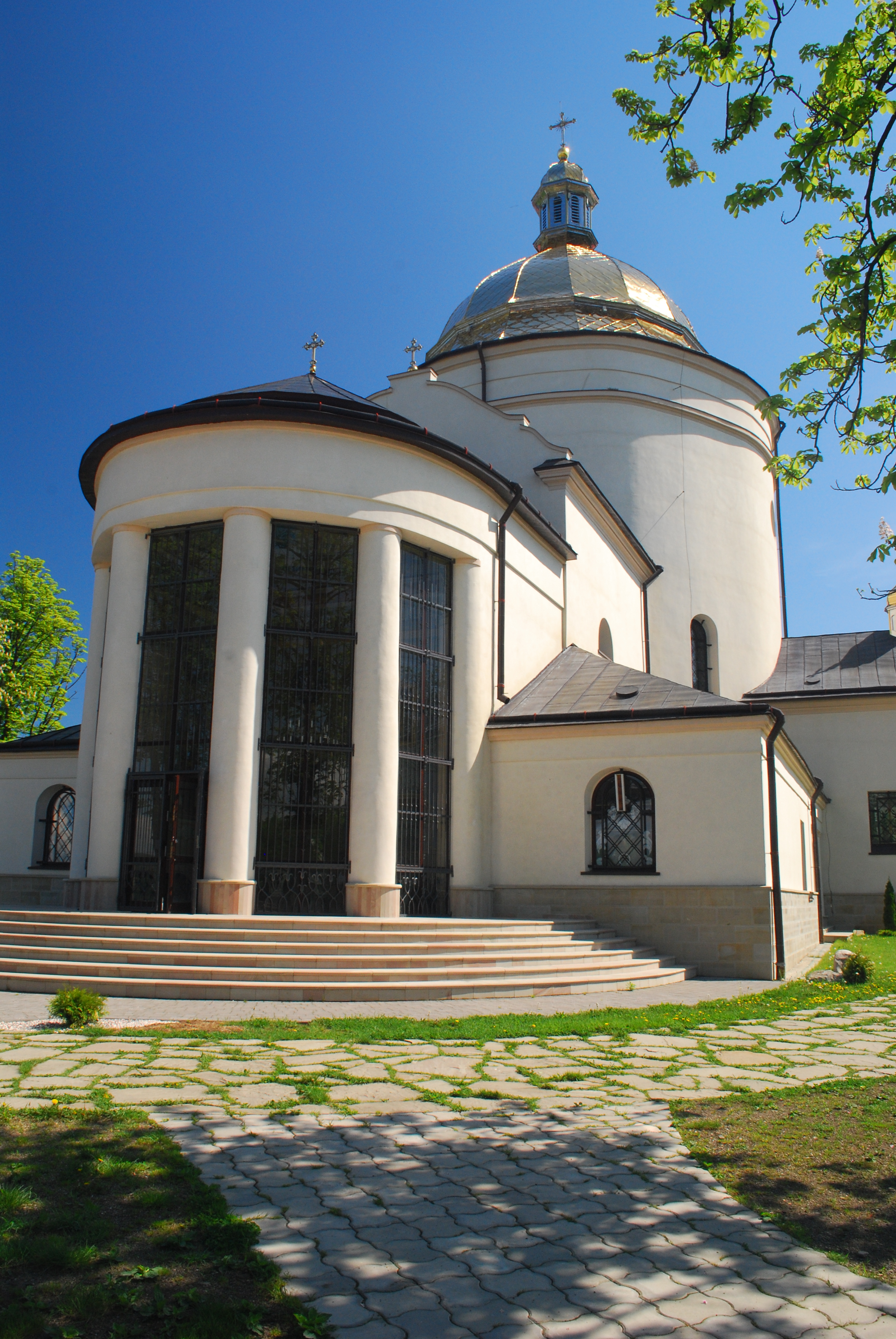
The Church of the Transfiguration in Hoshiv

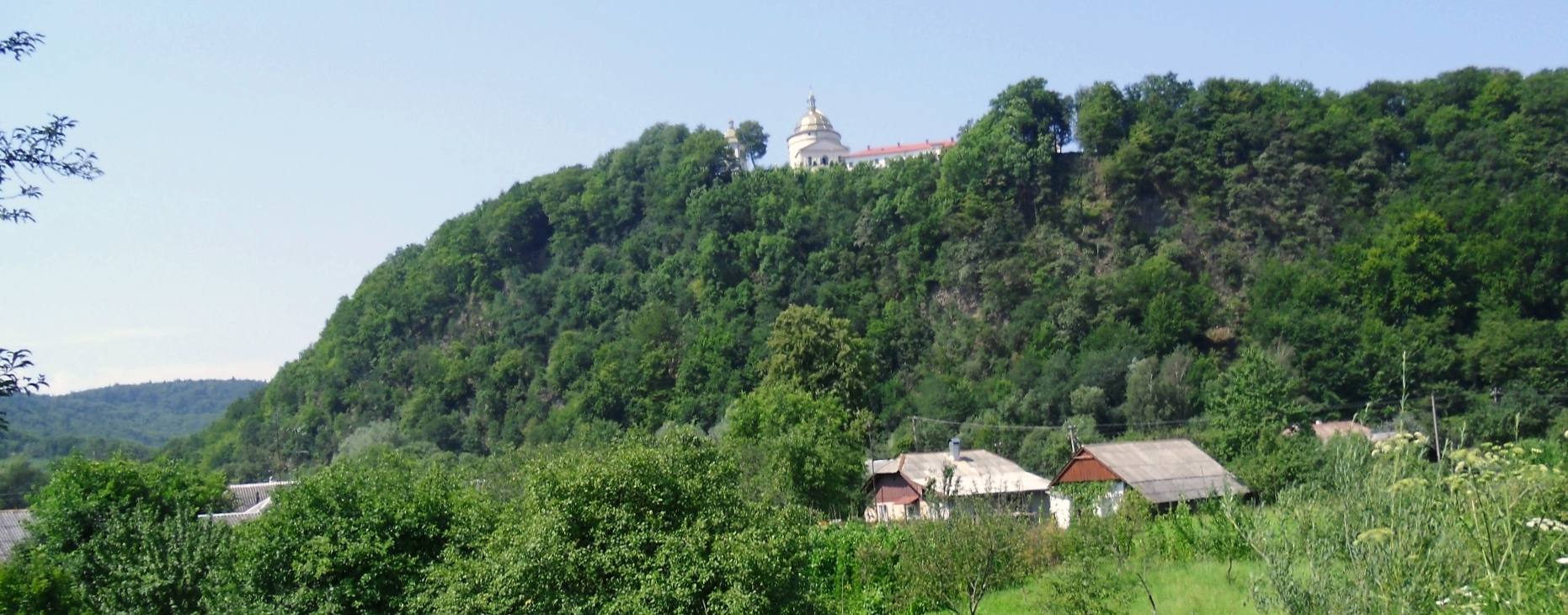
Greek-Catholic monastery in the village Hoshiv

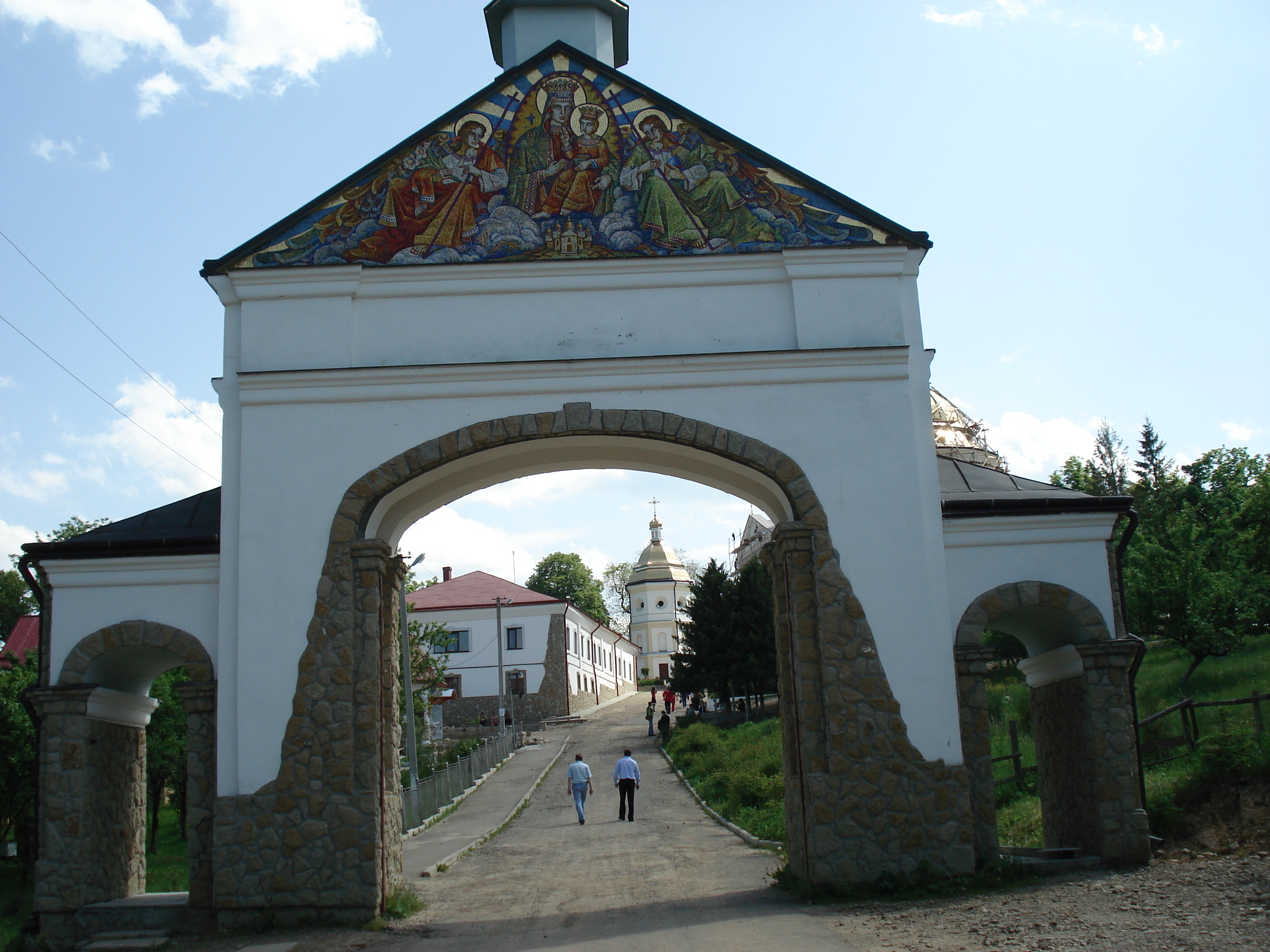
Entrance Gate to the Monastery Complex
