= Dolyna urban hromada =

Hromada in Ivano-Frankivsk Oblast, Ukraine

Dolyna urban hromada Долинська міська громада
- Hromada
- Coat of arms
- Interactive map of Dolyna urban hromada
- Country: Ukraine
- Oblast: Ivano-Frankivsk Oblast
- Raion: Kalush Raion
- Admin. center: Dolyna

Area
  - Total: 372.6 km^{2} (143.9 sq mi)

Population
  - Total: 48 644
  - Density: 0.13/km^{2} (0.33/sq mi)
- CATOTTG code: UA26060130000047466
- Settlements: 22
- Cities: 1
- Villages: 21
- Website: rada-dolyna.gov.ua

Dolyna urban hromada (Ukrainian: Долинська міська громада) is a hromada in Ukraine, in Kalush Raion of Ivano-Frankivsk Oblast. The administrative center is the city of Dolyna.

== Settlements ==
The hromada consists of 1 city (Dolyna) and 21 villages:

- Beleiv
- Velyka Turia
- Herynia
- Hoshiv
- Hrabiv
- Dibrova
- Kniazholuka
- Kryva
- Lopianka
- Mala Turia
- Nadiiv
- Novychka
- Obolonnia
- Pidberezhzhia
- Rakhynia
- Sloboda-Dolynska
- Solukiv
- Trostianets
- Tiapche
- Yavoriv
- Yakubiv
