= Dolynske oil field =

Oil field in Ivano-Frankivsk, Ukraine

Dolynske
- Country: Ukraine
- Region: Ivano-Frankivsk Oblast
- Offshore/onshore: onshore
- Operator: Ukrnafta

Field history
- Discovery: 1950
- Start of development: 1956
- Start of production: 1956

Production
- Estimated oil in place: 38.6 million tonnes (~ 43.2×10^{6} m^{3} or 272 million bbl)

The Dolynske oil field (Ukrainian: Долинське нафтове родовище) is a Ukrainian oil field that was discovered in 1950. It began production in 1956 and produces oil. The total proven reserves of the Dolynske oil field are around 272 million barrels (43,200,000 m^{3}), and production is centered on 2,000 barrels per day (320 m^{3}/d). In the 1960s, it was the oil field that produced the largest amount of oil in the whole Soviet Union, which Ukraine was then part of as the Ukrainian SSR until 1991 when it became independent. It is the most significant oil field of Ivano-Frankivsk Oblast (region).

The field covers an area of approximately 27-30 square kilometres, and lies within the Carpathian oil and gas province. The oil from the field is delivered to the oil refinery in Drohobych and the Dolyna gas processing plant.

== History ==
The field was discovered on 30 August 1950, when exploratory well no. 1 produced an oil flow of approximately 30 tonnes per day. Commercial development of the field began in 1956 at the layer containing menilite, and then in 1959 and 1961 additional layers were opened for development. During this time, it was under the oil production management "Dolynanafta" (later renamed to "Dolynanaftogaz" in 1970). The peak of oil production from the field came in 1966 when 2 million tonnes per year was reached. From 1950 to 2000, more than 49 million tonnes of oil were extracted.

Starting in 1966, water injection for reservoir pressure maintenace started, which was the first time in Ukraine this technique had been used. By the mid-1990s, more than 90% of the extractable reserves had already been produced, and by this point, it started to gradually decline in output, and high water cuts came out in production. Even after the independence of Ukraine in 1991, the field is still operated by Dolynanaftogaz, now a subsidiary of Ukrnafta. After the 2000s, nearly half of Ukrnafta's shares were acquired by Ihor Kolomoisky of the Privat Group, who now controls the field. In 2017, there was a large dispute between Dolyna and Dolynanaftogaz over land rental rates since the rate was raised, with Dolynanaftogaz arguing they were already paying an equivalent to a quarter of the city's budget annually.
