= Dolyna =

Urban locality in Ivano-Frankivsk Oblast, Ukraine

Dolyna Долина
- City
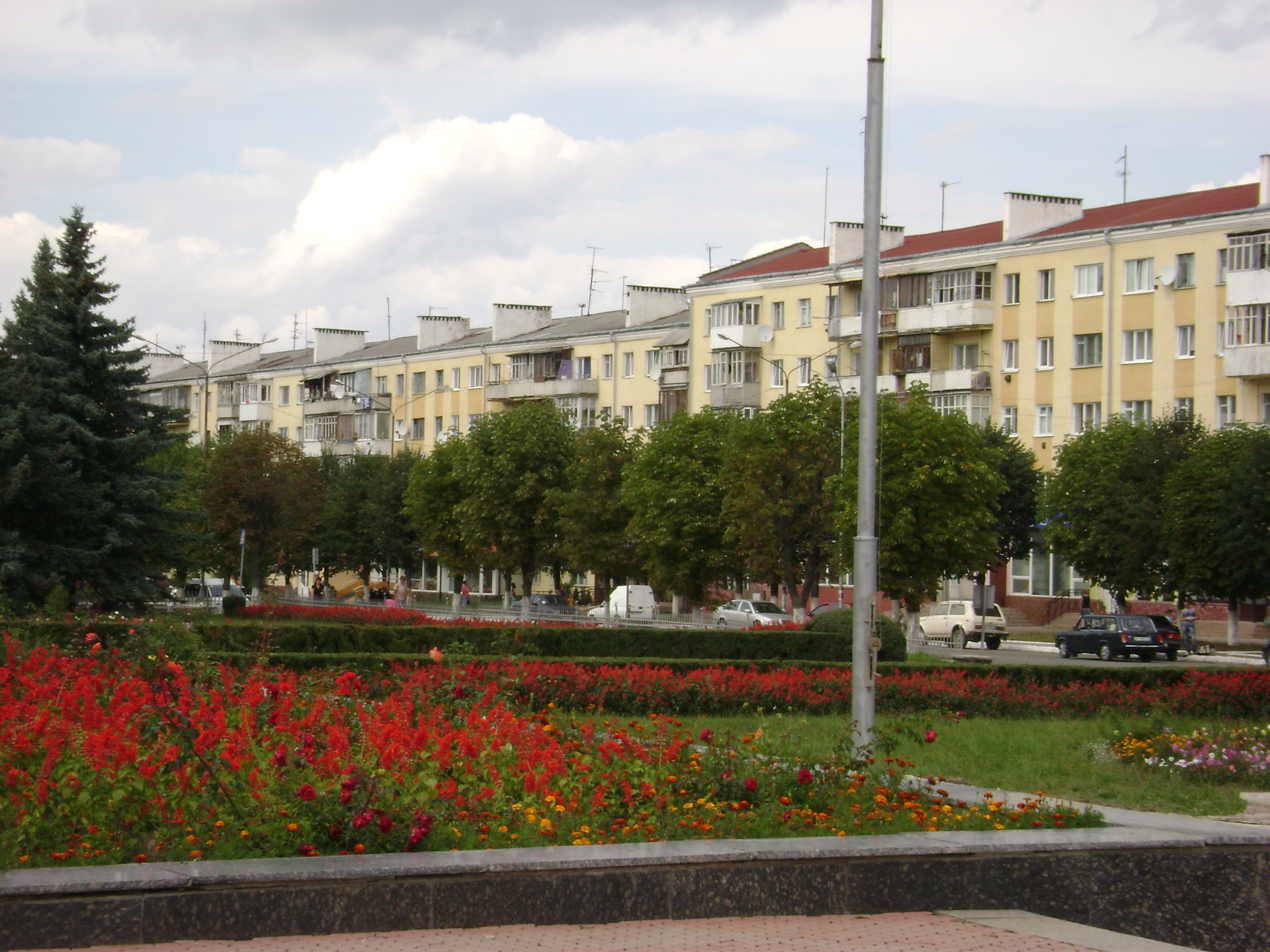
- Nezalezhnosti Avenue

- Flag Seal
- Interactive map of Dolyna
- Location within Ivano-Frankivsk Oblast Location within Ukraine
- Coordinates: 48°58′14″N 24°0′40″E
- Country: Ukraine
- Oblast: Ivano-Frankivsk Oblast
- Raion: Kalush Raion
- Hromada: Dolyna urban hromada

Government
  - Mayor: Ivan Dyriv

Population (2022)
  - Total: 20,417

Dolyna (Ukrainian: Долина, IPA: [doˈlɪnɐ]; Polish: Dolina; Yiddish: דאלינע) is a city in Kalush Raion, Ivano-Frankivsk Oblast, south-western Ukraine. It hosts the administration of Dolyna urban hromada, one of the hromadas of Ukraine. Population: 20,417 (2022 estimate). In 2001, population was around 20,900.

== Geography ==
Dolyna is located in the geographical region of Galician Prykarpattia, at the foothills of Gorgany mountain range. Svicha river flows in the area.

== History ==
The city's history reaches the 10th century, making it one of oldest in the region. By the 14th century Dolyna became renowned for its salt mine. In 1349 the city came under the rule of the Kingdom of Poland, where it remained until 1772 (see Partitions of Poland). In 1525 Dolyna, or Dolina, as it is called in Polish, was granted city rights under the Magdeburg law and the right to trade salt similar to that of Kolomyia. In 1740 in the city there was a riot of opryshky (Ukrainian rebels).

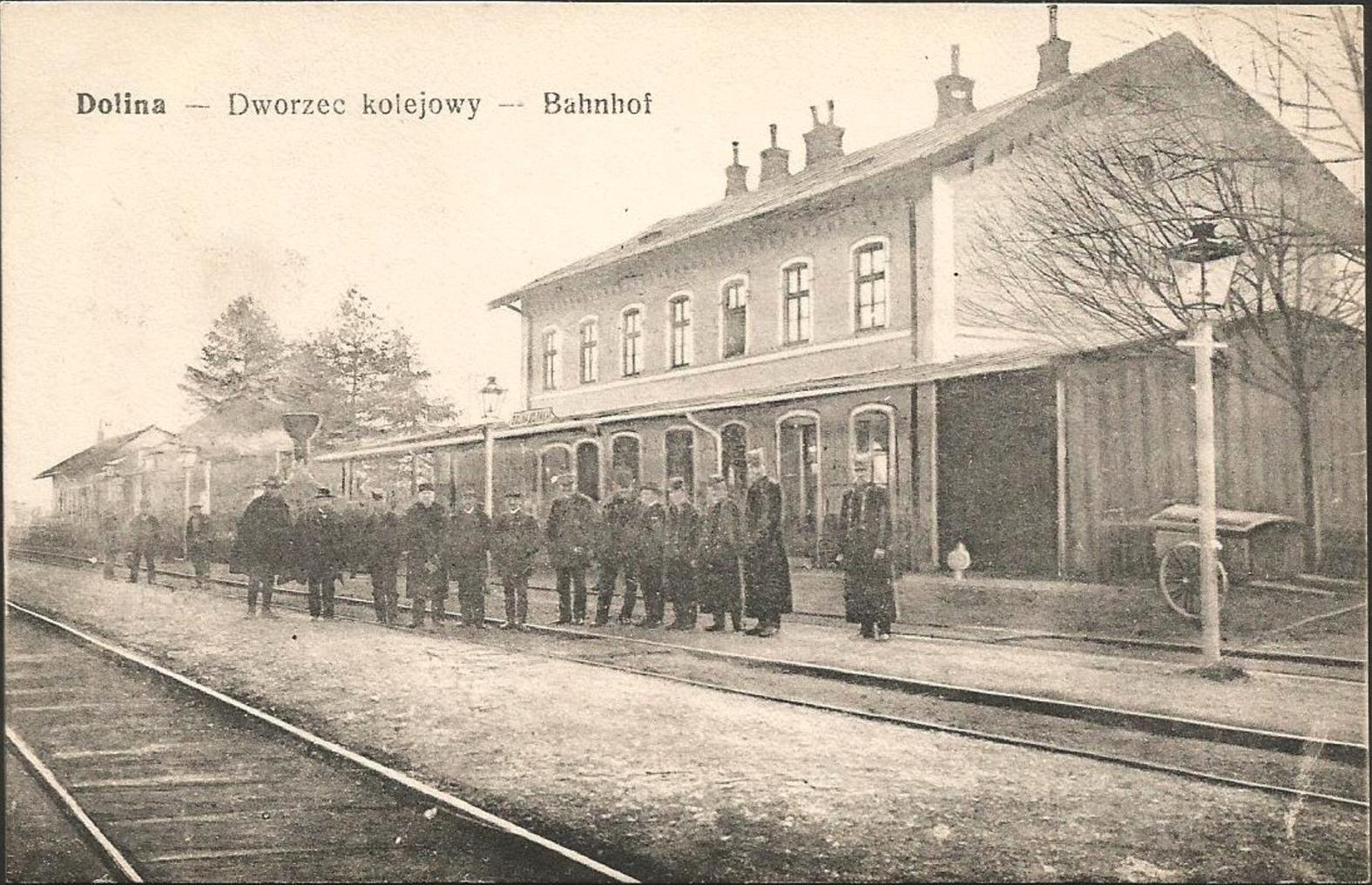
Railway station in 1917

In 1772 the city fell to Austrians and in 1791 it lost its status. During the second half of the 19th century a segment of the Archduke Albrecht Railway linking Stryi with Stanislaviv was led through the city, later becoming a part of the Galician Transversal Railway. By the end of the 19th century big fires destroyed the town completely. The first decade of the new century was dedicated to the revival of the town. After the collapse of Austria-Hungary, reborn Polish and Ukrainian states struggled for control over Dolyna in a war eventually won by Poles. In the Second Polish Republic, the town, with population of almost 10,000, belonged to the Stanisławów Voivodeship and was the capital of the Dolina County. Neighboring villages were inhabited by German settlers, who came there in the times of Joseph II.

During World War II the city was occupied by the USSR (September 1939 - June 1941), Hungary (July 1941), and Germany (August 1941 – 1944). During the German occupation, the Jewish population of Dolyna was murdered with only a few survivors. Most were murdered in Dolyna itself, including on August 3, 1942 when German police and their Ukrainian police auxiliaries drove 3500 Jews into the market square. They shot numerous children, sent some of the able bodied to labor camps, and took the remaining 2500 to the Jewish cemetery where they were shot. After the Germans removed valuables from the bodies, they ordered locals to bury the bodies in a mass grave. Some Jews had hidden and fled to the forests to join Jewish partisan groups. However, Ukrainian policeman and the Germans hunted down those in hiding and murdered them too.

After the war, Dolyna became part of the Ukrainian SSR. In the 1950s, oil deposits were discovered in the region which by 1958 produced 65% of oil extracted in the Ukrainian SSR. In the 1960s, the Dolynske oil field was the oil field that produced the largest amount of oil of the whole USSR.

Since 1991, Dolyna has been in independent Ukraine. Its oil field is one of the most powerful of Ivano-Frankivsk Oblast (region).

On December 18, 2016, the UGCC Church of St. Andrew the First-Called was blessed in Dolyna and consecrated on May 28, 2017. In 2017, at the International Mayors' Summit, the city received the Smart Cities Ukraine 2017 award in the Cleantech Solutions and Energy Efficiency category.

Dolyna is the only city in Ukraine to have received the European Energy Efficiency Management Certificate. For more than 10 years, Dolyna has insulated all public sector institutions in the city, modernized street lighting, abandoned centralized heating, and converted more than 60% of large boiler houses to alternative fuels, which is the highest rate in Ukraine.

The main priorities of the city are the development of tourism potential, as well as the restoration and preservation of an architectural monument of national importance - the buildings of the former saltworks of the late XIX century in the old part of Dolyna.

Until 18 July 2020, Dolyna was the administrative center of Dolyna Raion. The raion was abolished in July 2020 as part of the administrative reform of Ukraine, which reduced the number of raions of Ivano-Frankivsk Oblast to six. The area of Dolyna Raion was merged into Kalush Raion.

== Population ==
Historical population
| Year | Pop. | ±% |
|---|---|---|
| 1921 | 8,766 | — |
| 1931 | 9,616 | +9.7% |
| 2022 | 20,417 | +112.3% |

=== Language ===
Distribution of the population by native language according to the 2001 census:

| Language | Number | Percentage |
|---|---|---|
| Ukrainian | 20 119 | 97.21% |
| Russian | 473 | 2.29% |
| Other or undecided | 104 | 0.50% |
| Total | 20 696 | 100.00% |

== Economy ==
Dolyna is a historical centre of salt production and wood industry.

== Notable people ==
Most prominent among the people hailing from the city was Myroslav Ivan Lubachivsky, Major Archbishop of Lviv and head of the Ukrainian Church. Among other notable inhabitants of Dolyna, there is Rudolf Regner, a hero of the Polish World War II resistance.

Other famous personalities associated with Dolyna are:

- Stanisław Jaworski, Polish film and theatre actor
- Antoni Kępiński, Polish psychiatrist and philosopher
- Ivan Levynskyi, Ukrainian architect
- Władysław Ogrodziński, Polish writer and journalist

== Football ==
The city has a football club FC Naftovyk Dolyna.

== Gallery ==
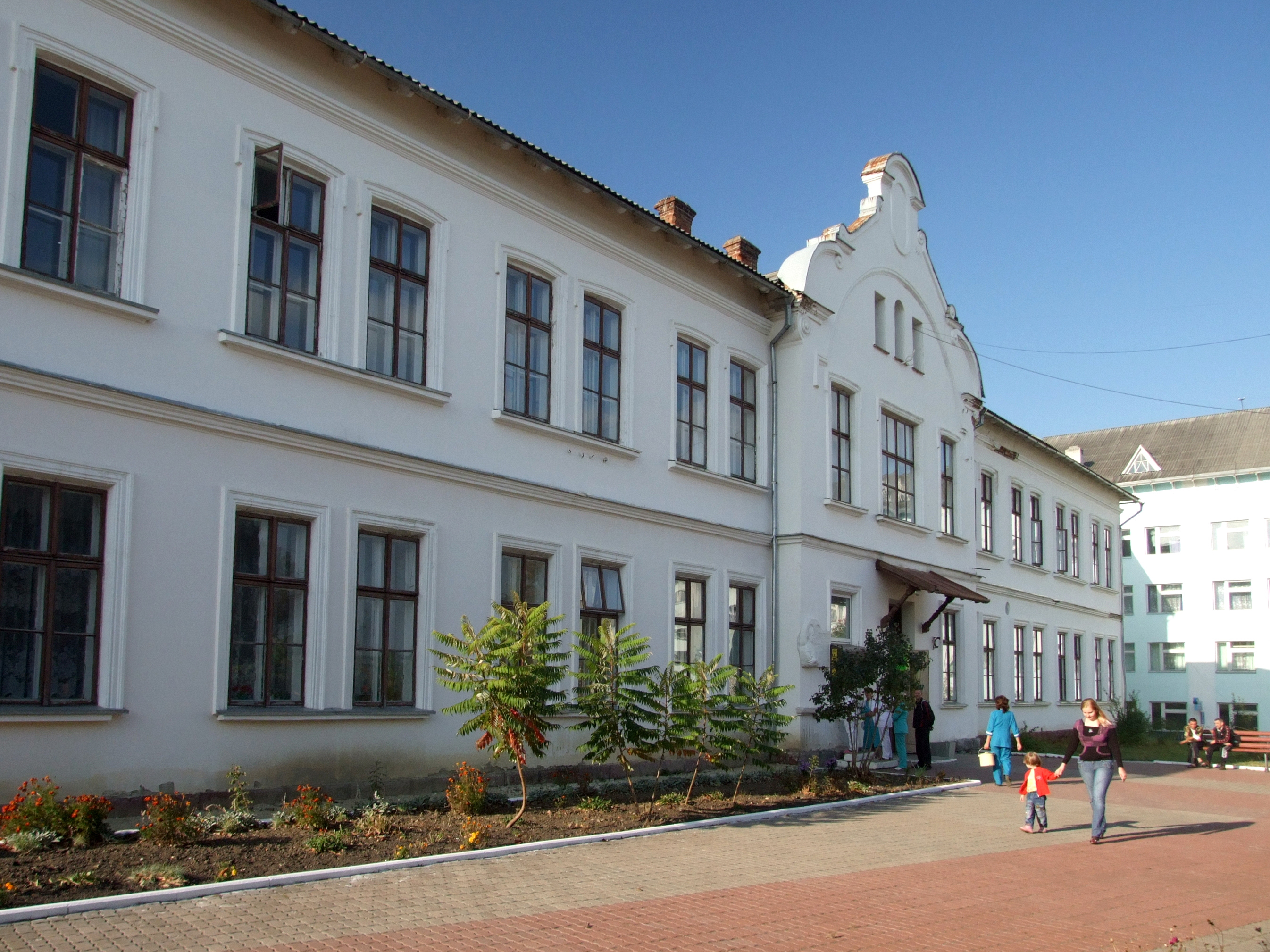
Dolyna hospital

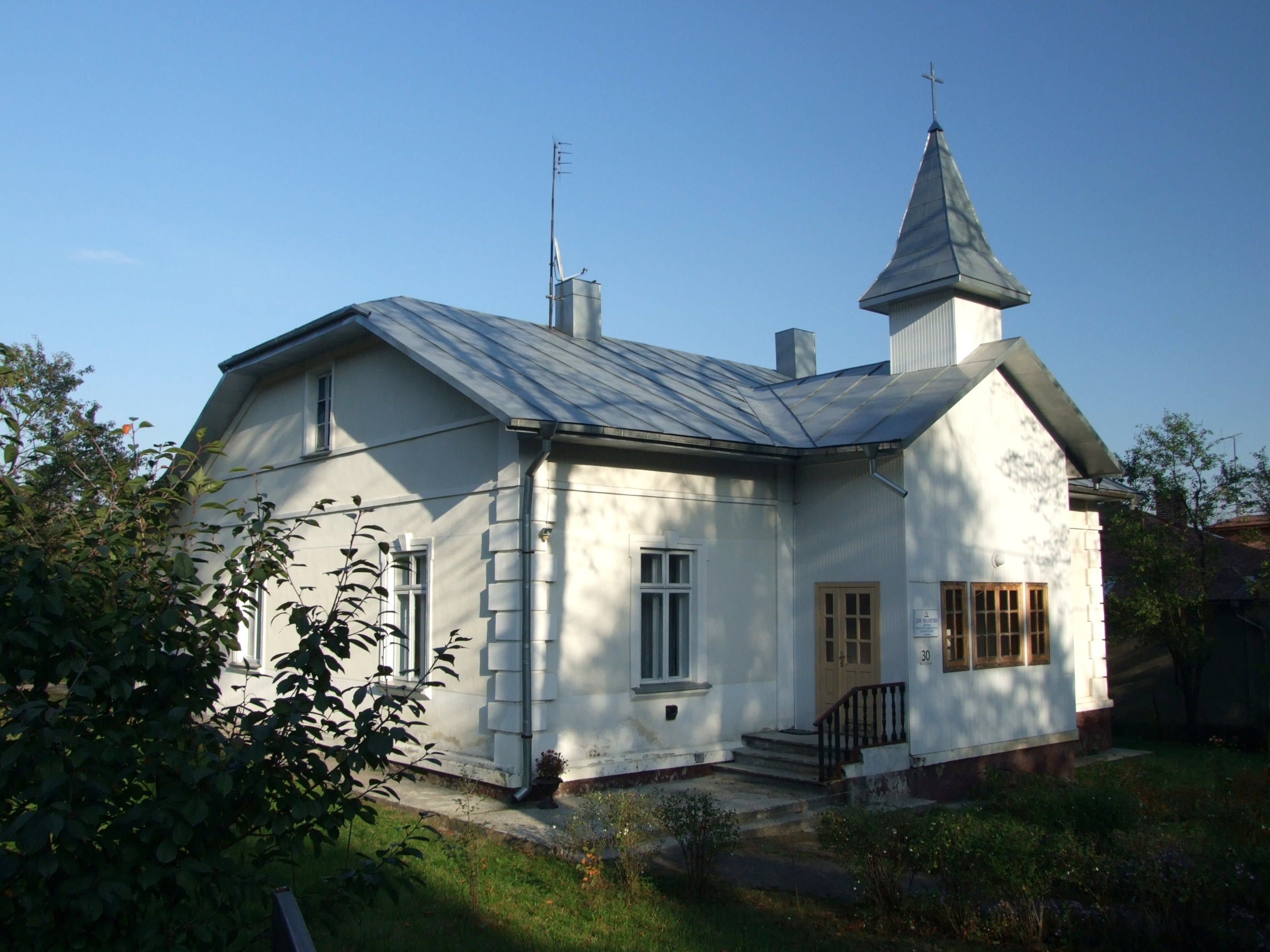
Historical building at Antonovycha Street, 30

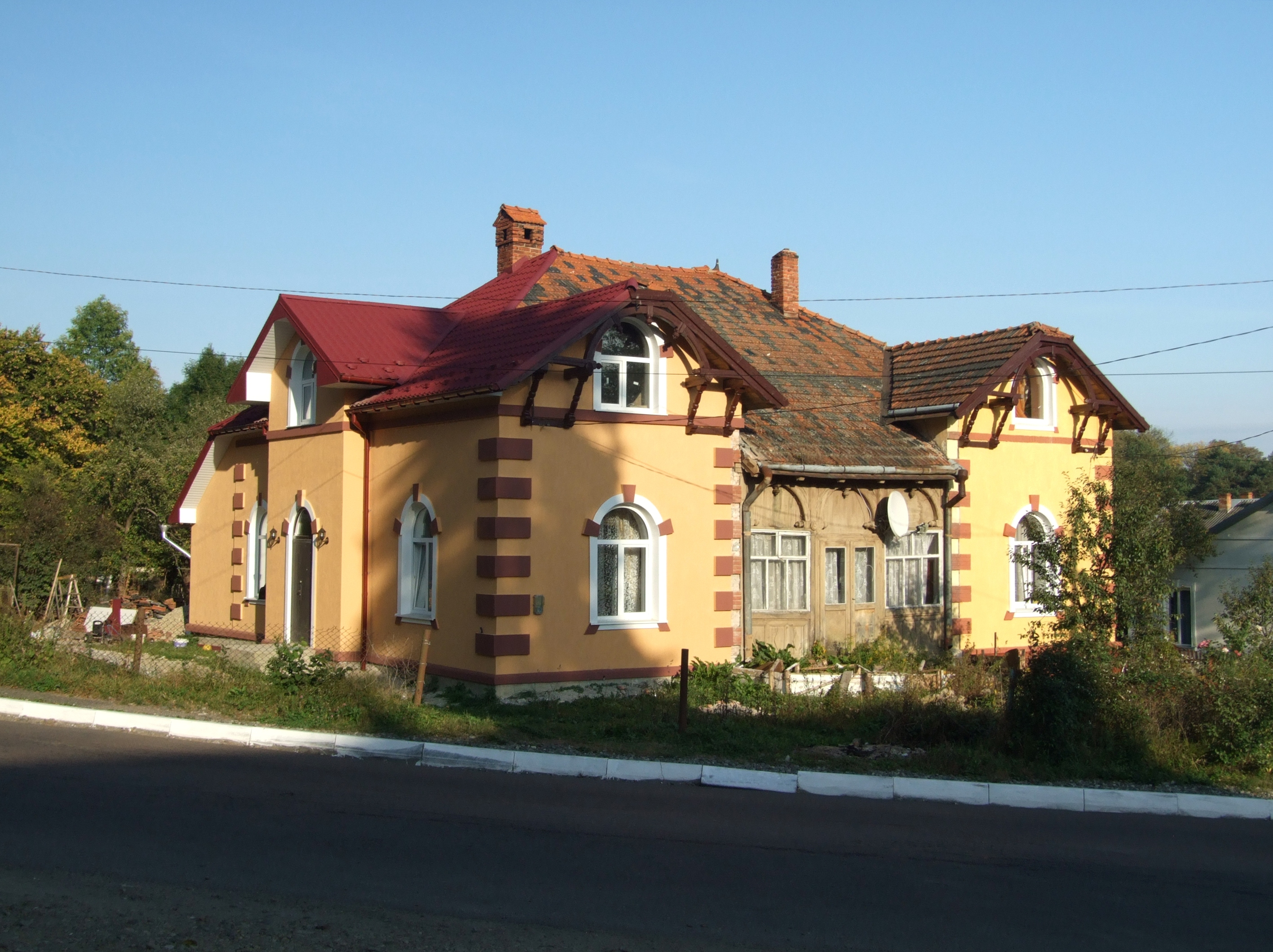
Historical building in Dolyna at Antonovycha Street, 32

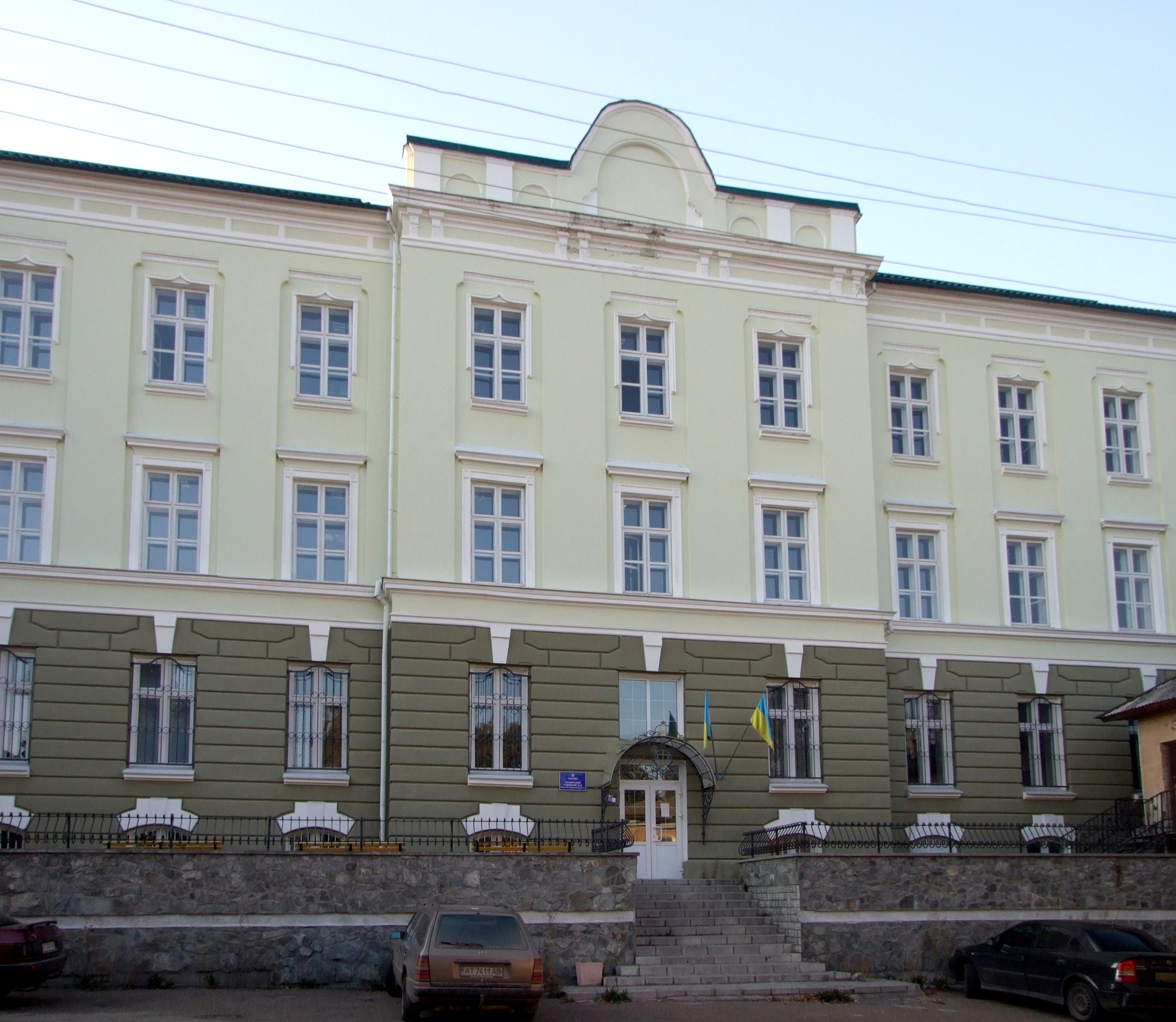
District court

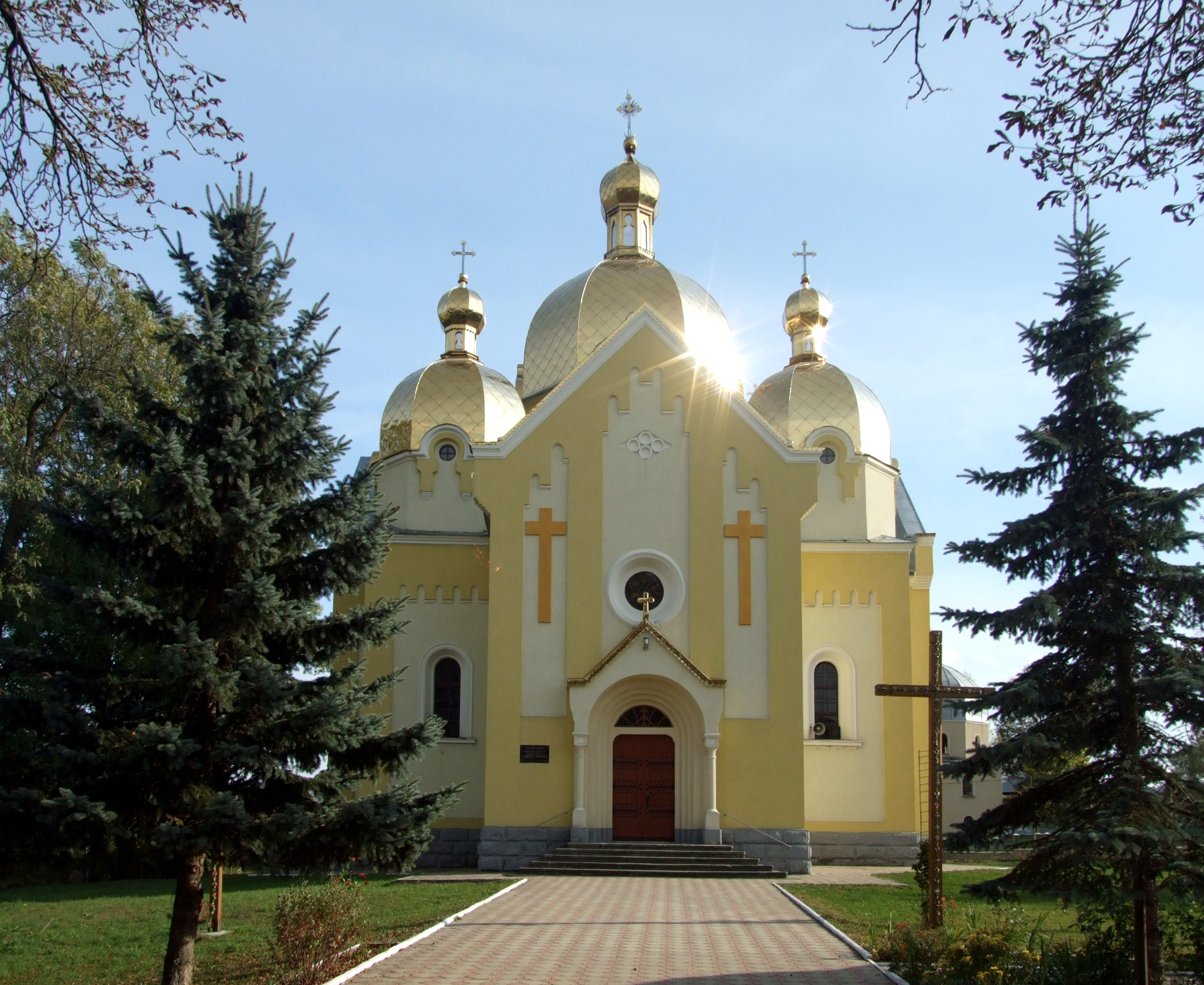
Church of the Nativity of Theotokos (Greek Catholic)

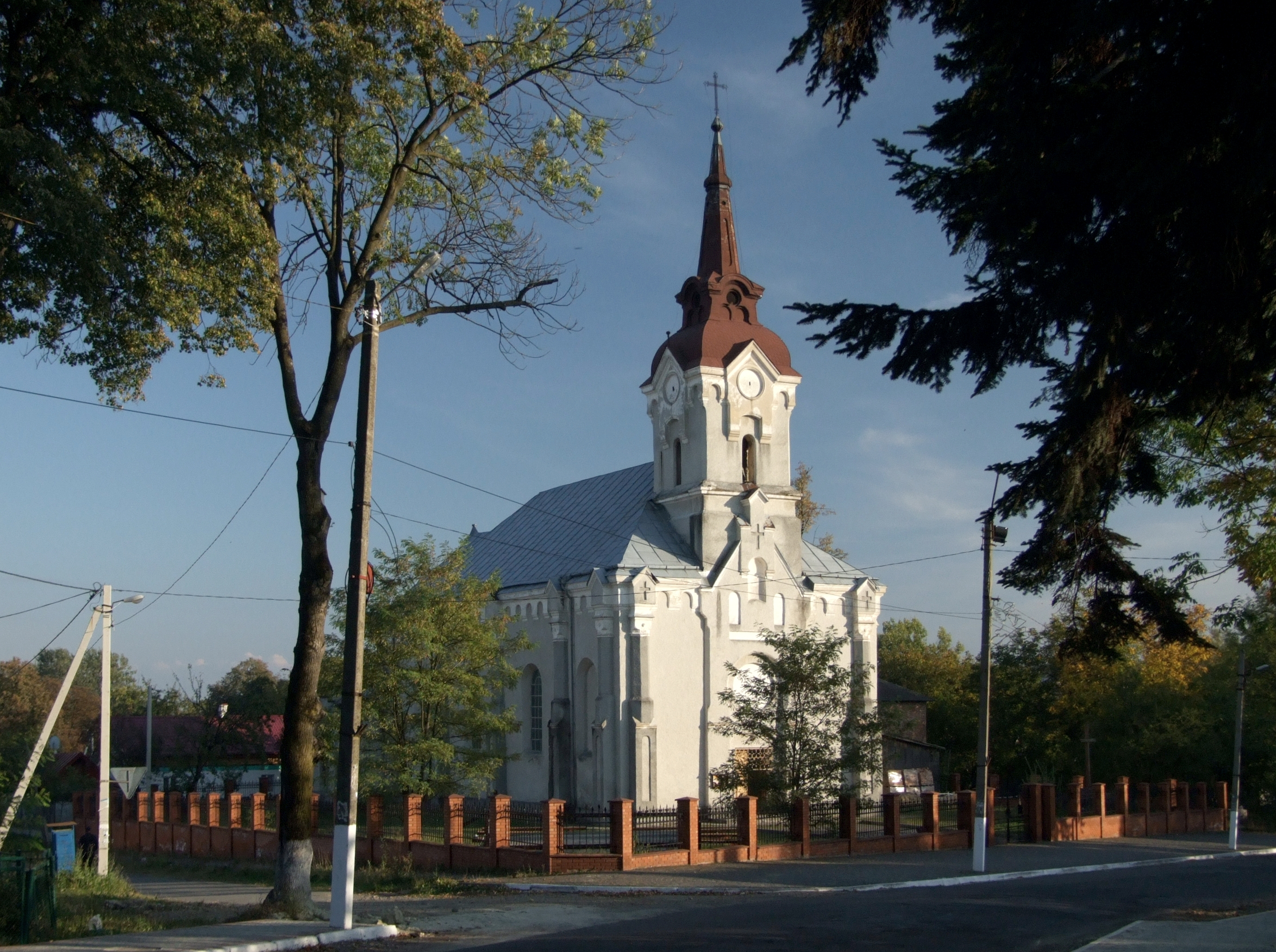
Church of the Nativity of Anne-Mary (Roman Catholic)

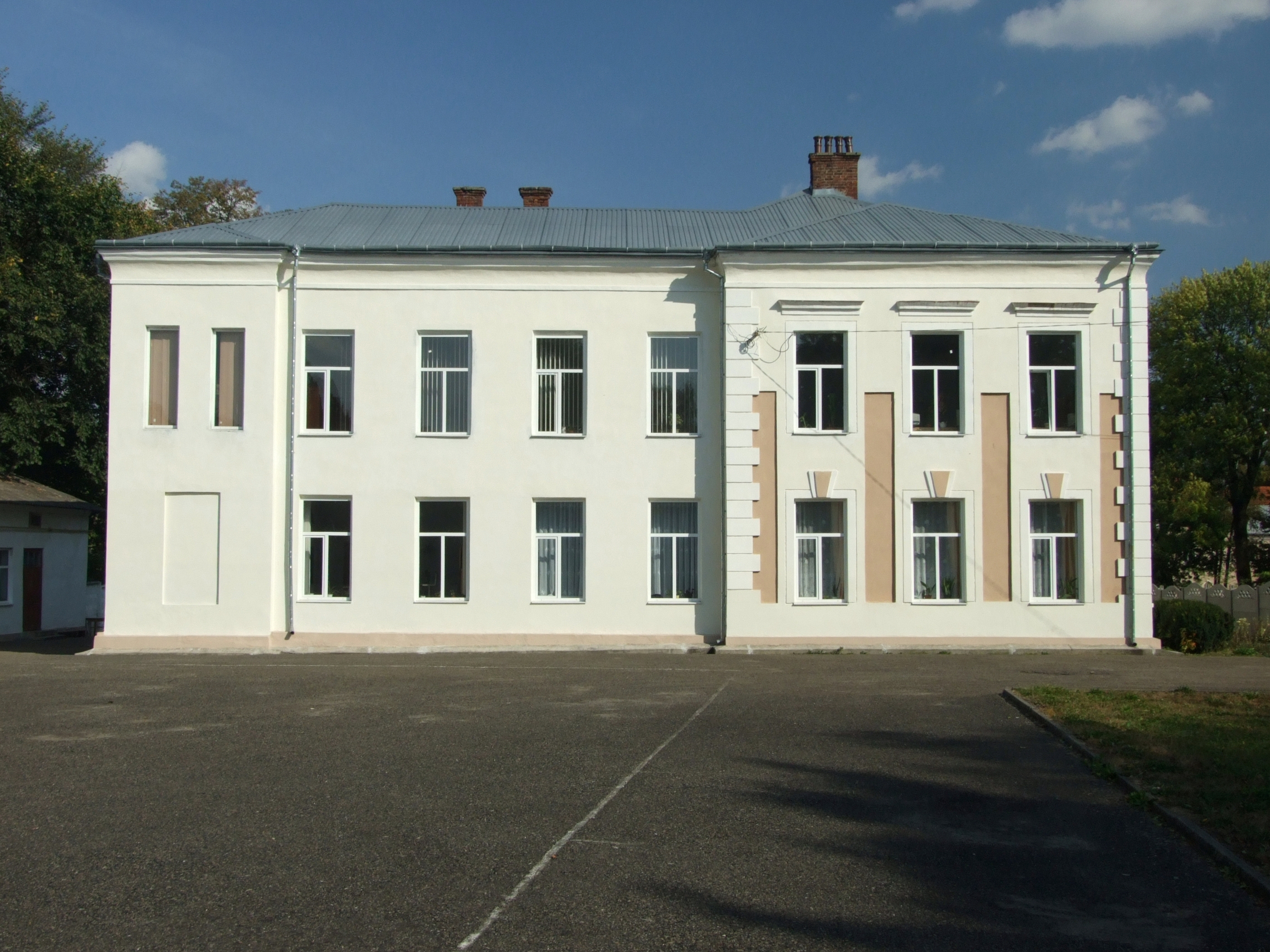
Gymnasium

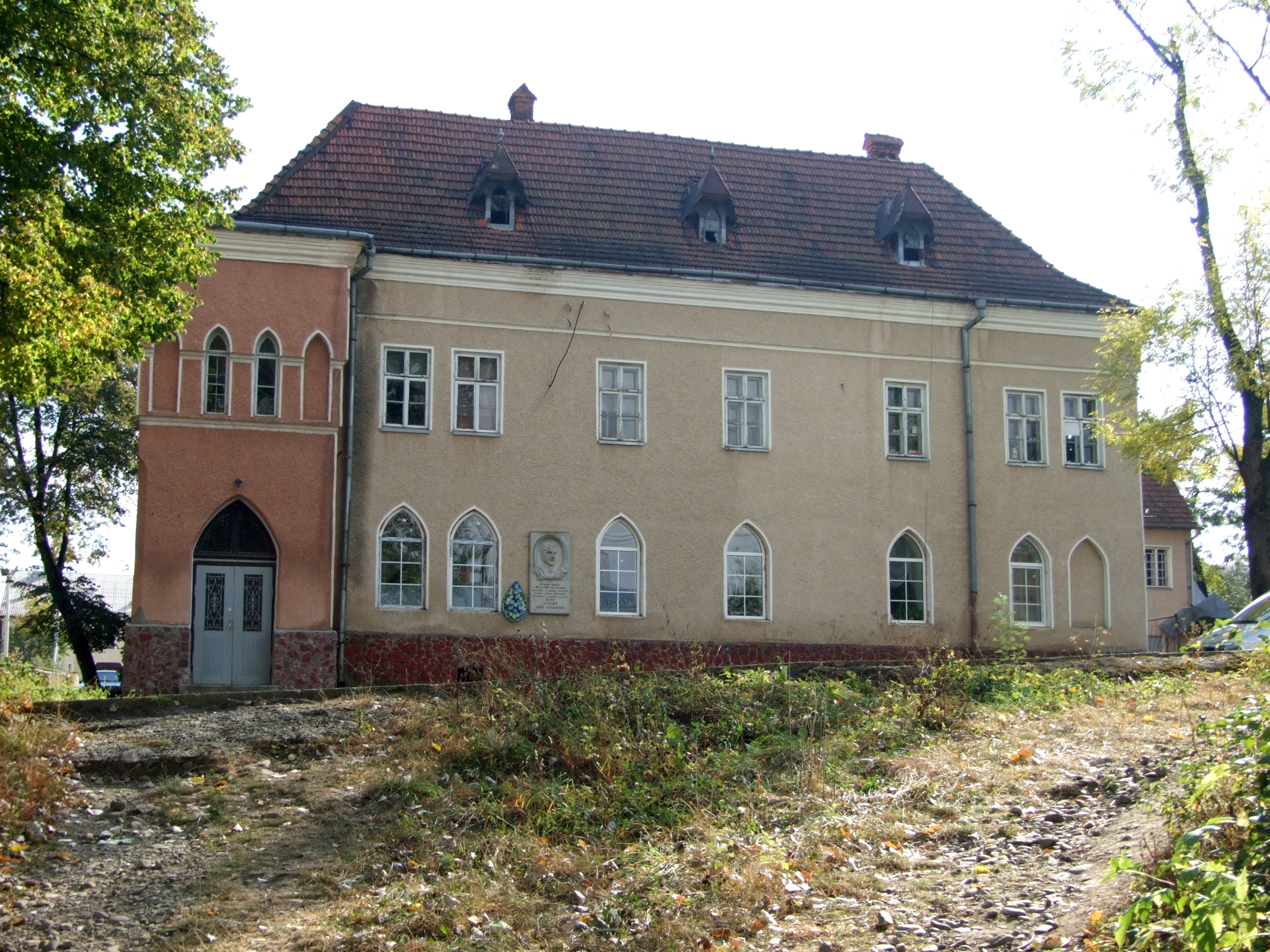
"Sokil" fellowship building

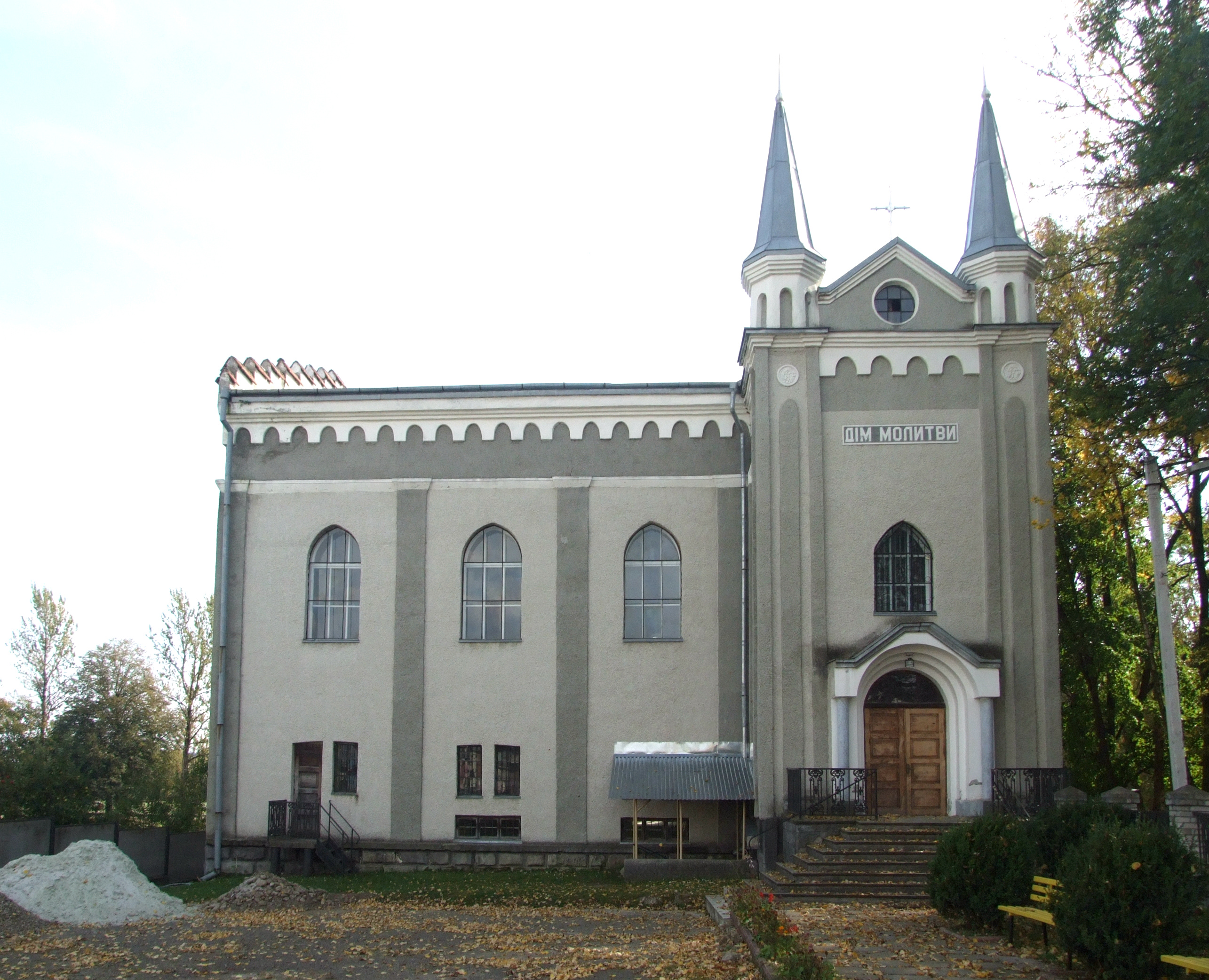
Former synagogue

== Twin towns – sister cities ==
Dolyna is twinned with:

- Grodzisk Wielkopolski, Poland
- Montigny-le-Bretonneux, France
- Niemodlin, Poland
- Nowa Sarzyna, Poland
- Orhei, Moldova
- Prairie Village, United States
- Rubizhne, Ukraine
- Zviahel, Ukraine

== Location ==
Local orientation

Regional orientation
