= Piotr Ogrodziński =

Polish diplomat and philosopher

Piotr Andrzej Ogrodziński
- Born: September 7, 1951; Paris, France
- Occupations: Diplomat and philosopher
- Years active: 1971-
- Known for: Polish ambassador to Canada
- Spouse: Joanna Kawalerowicz-Ogrodzińska

Piotr Andrzej Ogrodziński (born 7 September 1951) is a Polish diplomat, activist and philosopher.

== Activist ==
Ogrodziński was born in Paris where his father, Przemysław Ogrodziński, was serving as the Polish charge d'affairs at the Polish embassy. Ogrodziński's father was a senior diplomat under the Communist regime. Ogrodziński's mother, Halina Jacuńska-Ogrodzińska, was recognized by the Yad Vashem Institute in Jerusalem as one of Righteous Among the Nations on 28 June 1979 for hiding two Jewish women, Maria Glass and Olga Lilien during the Holocaust.

In a 2008 essay, he recalled about his generation: "My generation, born into the Polish People’s Republic, took the meagerness of life under socialism as a given, but, step by step, discovered that it didn’t work because of its economic inefficiency and its false ethics. Initially, we lived practicing opportunism by pretending to believe in the ruling ideology and being preoccupied by small things. It was the grayness of “a little stability” or – as the Czech writer Milan Kundera called it – the unbearable lightness of being. Our experience and sense of history were based on a chain of strikes and political upheavals of 1956, 1968, 1970, 1976 and 1980–81."

As a five-year old in Warsaw, Ogrodziński witnessed the Polish October revolution of 1956 where a nationalist faction of the Communist Party under Władysław Gomułka overthrew the Stalinist leadership as he remembered seeing huge crowds of workers march down the streets of Warsaw demanding a new government. Gomułka had spoken of a "Polish Road To Socialism", promising greater independence from the Soviet Union and a de-Stalinizing "thaw" similar to the one in the Soviet Union. Initially popular, Gomułka's authoritarian style of leadership had made him unpopular by the late 1960s. As a high school student in January 1968, Ogrodziński attended the celebrated theater production of the play Dziady (Forefathers) by Adam Mickiewicz. Forefathers was set in the 19th century Congress Poland and featured Russian villains, leading to Varsovian audiences of 1968 to see the play as a metaphor for Soviet domination of Poland. The banning of Dziady on 30 January 1968 after playing for only 14 times set off the "March events" in Poland that severally threatened Gomułka's hold on power. Ogrodziński recalled that the principal problem with opposition to the Communist dictatorship was the divide between the working class and the intelligentsia. During the March events of 1968, it was university students and intellectuals who protested while the working class assisted the police. In December 1970 a workers revolt broke out in Gdańsk, leading to the Polish Army being deployed against the working class of Gdańsk with at least 44 workers shot down while the intellectuals and students stayed passive.

From 1971 to 1975, he attended the University of Warsaw, where he graduated from the Institute of Economic Sciences. As a student, he become involved in opposition to the Communist dictatorship, working for a transition to a democracy. As an young anti-Communist activist, Ogrodziński worked to bridge the gap between the working class and the intelligentsia, believing that an alliance of the workers and intellectuals was the best way of bringing down the Communist regime. Ogrodziński felt that the protests and strikes of June 1976 were the turning point in the struggle against the regime as for the first time the workers and intellectuals worked together. From 1977 onward, he worked to provide logistical support for the underground newspaper of Robotnik. In a 2013 interview, Ogrodziński stated: "For me, I was Left-oriented, but quite critical of the Polish People’s Republic. Already in the 1970s, I was in the gray zone of KOR [Komitet Obrony Robotników-Workers Defense Committee]. They had a bulletin called Robotnik (Worker). Their archives were at my flat. The editorial board met at my flat. So, I knew them...I was not part of KOR, but they were my friends. They were not happy with my leftish orientation, but they turned out to a large extent to be leftists too." Keenly interested in the philosophy of politics, Ogrodziński worked at the Institute of Philosophy and Sociology of the Polish Academy of Sciences from 1978 to 1990.

In September 1980, he joined the newly founded Solidarność union, which had just staged a successful strike at the Lenin shipyard in Gdańsk in August 1980. In October 1980, Ogrodziński founded the journal NTO (Nauka-Technika-Oświata), representing the members of the science, technology and education workers section of Solidarność. Ogrodziński recalled about his activities in 1980-81: "As a journalist working for NTO, a regional Solidarity bulletin, I would travel through Poland and was welcomed by complete strangers as if I was a good, old friend. There was little suspicion – and a lot of enthusiasm and good faith".

Following the declaration of martial law on 13 December 1981 that saw Solidarność banned, he worked with the underground CDN publishing house from February 1982 onward. Ogrodziński joined the illegal MRKS (Inter-Factory Workers Committee of Solidarnosc). About the underground struggle in the 1980s, he remembered: "When I think of those days, I am moved by the bravery of people who let us use their homes for meetings of our underground organization. We could not meet in public places since the police constantly watched them. Every few months we had to change apartments and find new people who were afraid but felt obliged to help us." On 1 May 1982, for the May Day celebrations, Ogrodziński helped to organise Solidarność demonstrations in Warsaw against the regime.

In 1986, he was awarded a PhD in philosophy at the University of Warsaw. In the 1989 elections for the Sejm, he was involved in the campaign of the Solidarity Citizens' Committee. Ogrodziński helped to design the famous "High Noon" poster featuring Gary Cooper as the sheriff from the 1952 film High Noon, but wearing a Solidarność badge in place of the sheriff's badge and carrying a ballot instead of a gun.

As someone who had grown up under the Communist dictatorship, Ogrodziński is keenly interested in creating a philosophy that will uphold a civil society. The Polish philosopher Piotr Gliński summarized Ogrodziński's work in philosophy as: "Moral social order stands guard over civic relations . The development of civil society would be jeopardised whenever there exists a significant gap between the state and society". In 1991, Ogrodziński published a book Pięć tekstów o społeczeństwie obywatelskim (Five Essays on Civil Society), which argued that Poland's principal problem was a "crippled civil society" after decades of foreign rule starting in 1939.

In August 2013, Ogrodziński stated in an interview: "I published a small book called Five Essays on Civil Society. At the beginning of the 1990s I was involved in the topic of civil society, which was an East-Central Europe sort of topic. The main thrust of my argument was that there is a strong logical relationship between market economy and democracy. I never interpreted civil society simply as a set of NGOs. I saw it as a certain structure of society in which the state is externalized - this is the Hegelian sense of civil society -- so that there is a space for freedom of action. The market is logically a type of such activity. There are certain rules but within the rules there is room for initiative. But that was probably the mainstream thinking of quite a few people at that time, that if you want to have democracy you need to have a market economy. It had a catastrophic result for those who were largely the real authors of the transition, since the power of Solidarnosc was connected to the great industrial plants, which very often proved to be economically inefficient. The current market reality of the Gdańsk shipyard is a symbol of such a process."

At an academic conference in London in 1993, Ogrodziński noted in Hungary, the Czech republic and Slovakia, the concept of Mitteleuropa (German for "middle Europe) had much appeal, but in Poland the concept of Mitteleuropa was seen as a threat, which he attributed to Poland's experiences of being partitioned four times, which led the Poles to see Prussia/Germany as a threat from the west in a way that the Hungarians, Czechs and Slovaks did not. Ogrodziński also noted the fluidity of Poland's eastern frontiers, which frequently changed over the centuries, further limited the appeal of the Mitteleuropa concept as for the Poles the precise eastern ends of Poland were often the subject of debate. Ogrodziński gave as an example that the city his parents were from, Lwów, a place that the Poles regarded at the time as an integral part of Poland, was now the Ukrainian city of Lviv. Ogrodziński noted there was some uncertainly about Poland's precise identity within Europe, citing the well known remark by the playwright Sławomir Mrożek that Poland was east of the West and west of the East. The Australian philosopher Kenneth Minogue noted that the question "Should Poland become more like the West?" was a difficult one, arguing that the economic advantages of such a change would have to be balanced against the threats to Poland's cultural identity and values. In response, Ogrodziński argued that before 1989, it was possible to ask straight "yes/no" questions on this issue, but that was now longer the case as Polish opinion on this issue was very complicated and nuanced. Ogrodziński noted his own surprise to discover that as a citizen he now had the right to demand a say in how the Polish state spent its money. Ogrodziński argued that the changing meanings of what it now meant to be a Polish citizen ensured there was no unanimity on this issue at all in modern Poland as there was much debate about the precise meaning of Polish citizenship in a philosophical sense.

== Diplomat ==
From 1991 to 1997 Ogrodziński was an assistant professor at the Institute of Political Studies of the Polish Academy of Sciences. Following his father's footsteps, in 1993 he started working at the Ministry of Foreign Affairs. Ogrodziński served as the deputy director of the Department of Studies and Planning from 1993 to 1997, as a counselor minister from 1997 to 1998 and as deputy ambassador of the Polish embassy in Washington from 1998 to 2001. In Washington, his principal duty was negotiating Poland's accession to the North Atlantic Treaty Organization, which had one of the principal goals of Polish foreign policy since 1989.

In 2001, he was promoted as the director of the American department at the Ministry of Foreign Affairs. Ogrodziński took an Atlanticist line, saying in 2004: "This is a country that thinks seriously about its security. There's no doubt that for such a country, it's good to be a close ally of the United States". In 2004, he told the American media his concerns over what he felt was a lack of American gratitude for Poland's contribution to the Iraq war while denying Poles visa free travel to the United States, saying: "It's very hard to explain why one Polish kid is risking his life in Iraq and another kid is being stopped at the U.S. border because he happened to land in the wrong city".

From 2004 to 2009, he served as the Polish ambassador to Canada. As the Polish ambassador in Ottawa, Ogrodziński's principal concern was the war in Afghanistan, where both Polish and Canadian soldiers fought together against the Taliban and al-Qaeda. Ogrodziński stated in 2006 about the war in Afghanistan: "We want to see the ISAF operations be successful. The more flexibility in the possible use of troops, the better". As both Poland and Canada were one of the relatively NATO members that allowed their soldiers to fight in the dangerous Kandahar province of Afghanistan, which was a hotbed of Taiban activity as it bordered Pakistan, the Polish stance won Poland many admirers in Ottawa.

On 14 October 2007, a Polish man, Robert Dziekanski, was killed in Vancouver by four constables of the Royal Canadian Mounted Police who zapped him several times with Tasers, causing him to suffer a fatal heart attack. The killing of Dziekanski, which was recorded live by a man named Paul Pritchard at Vancouver International Airport caused much controversy in Poland where it was widely felt to be a case of excessive force. Ogrodziński asked for Canadian officials to discuss the Dziekanski case. At the time, Ogrodziński told the Canadian media: "The video does not give us a clear recording of what he was shouting but what I have heard in Polish is the beginning...Pol, which could be either policja — in other words calling for police — or pomocy, which in Polish means help". Ogrodziński stated he felt great sadness about Dziekanski's killing and that: "I believe Canadians are extremely compassionate and they have this feeling of sympathy...to help someone who seems to be helpless and disoriented". In an interview with The Irish Times, Ogrodziński stated: "The reaction of the RCMP officers was unsuitable to the situation. What I've seen was that Mr Dziekanski was a person who was agitated, frustrated, I think terrified, but not aggressive. He was not making a gesture that he intended to fight anybody".

In December 2008, when Tomasz Lis, the Polish consul in Vancouver, was alleged to have crashed his automobile while driving drunk, Ogrodziński told the Canadian media that Lis had been suspended as a consul while his diplomatic immunity had been waived, meaning that Lis would face prosecution for the incident. Ogrodziński stated: "Whatever the legal procedures and requirements of the Canadian legal system, he will be facing them. He'll be available...Suspension is because the benefit of the doubt is there. You don't make final decisions before you are in possession of all possible information about what has happened. We are now in the process of clarification where we need to be very open for the benefit of the doubt in the sense to evaluate Mr. Lis's story, but I think the replacement of Mr. Lis is very likely. I couldn't imagine a situation where he would continue his function...At the same time, I know him personally. I believe he is a very nice person. I am really in great distress that things went so bad."

In a co-op in The Globe & Mail newspaper published on 6 March 2009, Ogrodziński together with Karel Zebrakovsky, the ambassador of the Czech republic, and Pal Vastagh, the ambassador of Hungary, wrote of their collective thanks that their respective nations felt for "Canada for its invaluable contribution to the well-being of Europe." The three ambassadors expressed their appreciation for Lester Pearson, who as the Canadian minister of external affairs, insisted on including as part of the North Atlantic Treaty article 2 which stated that its members "should be bound together not merely by their common opposition to totalitarian communist aggression, but by a common belief in the values and virtues of...democracy and a positive love of it and their fellow men.", leading to Article 2 being known as the "Canada clause". The three ambassadors concluded: "While a defence alliance at its core, NATO has always been more than that. It has served to give the West - only physically separated by the Atlantic Ocean - secure foundations to foster democracy worldwide. Because of our experience, the Poles, Czechs and Hungarians do not take this model for granted. We are confident that Canada will likewise never tire of nourishing transatlantic solidarity living by the values our dear friends put to good use 60 years ago and have abided by ever since".

In October 2009, a dispute arose over a proposed monument in Ottawa to the "victims of totalitarian Communism", leading to objections from the Communist Party of Canada led by Miguel Figueroa over the name. In an email he sent about the dispute, Ogrodziński wrote: "With all due respect to Canadian sensitivities we cannot change history. Many millions lost their lives because of the policies of communist regimes and we have to be also sensitive and remember the victims of these crimes...Many innocent Polish people perished because of Stalin during the communist rule in Poland. These are historical facts that will never be forgotten by Polish Canadians". Ogrodziński gave the Katyn Forest massacre of 3 April 1940 where some 20, 000 Polish POWs were shot by the Soviet NKVD secret police as an example of Communist crimes that he wanted to see remembered.

In October 2009, when the RCMP decided not to prosecute the four constables of the RCMP who killed Dziekanski, Ogrodziński read out a letter at the public inquiry in Vancouver asking for the four constables to be prosecuted as he stated: "Justice must be achieved, responsibility determined, and wrongdoers be made accountable through criminal prosecution". Ogrodziński felt there was a conflict of interest with the RCMP investigating the constables responsible for Dziekanski's death.

During his five years in Ottawa, Ogrodziński successfully negotiated an agreement to allow visa free travel between Canada and Poland. One of Ogrodziński's principal duties in Ottawa was protesting against the term 'Polish camps' to describe the Nazi death camps in Poland, leading him to write 30 letters of protest to various Canadian media outlets during his five years in Canada. In 2009, Ogrodziński told the Canadian columnist Paul Wells: "It’s absolutely false that Poles had anything to do with concentration camps, with the exception that they were the first prisoners". Ogrodziński complained to Wells about an article by the journalist Katie Engelhart in the 16 November 2009 edition of Maclean's where she wrote about the Ukrainian-American John Demjanjuk, calling him a man who had been mistaken for "a notorious sadist at Poland’s Treblinka death camp", spoke about " “Poland’s Treblinka death camp", and stated that Demjanjuk had "served at three Polish camps" as a guard. Ogrodziński felt that Engelhart's article had given the erroneous impression that it was the Polish government that operated the Treblinka death camp, and asked for Maclean's to apologize, a request that was granted. Upon his return to Warsaw, he again served as the director of the America Department at the Ministry of Foreign Affairs.

== Public intellectual ==
In 2010, Ogrodziński was one of the founders of the Museum of the History of Polish Jews in Warsaw. At the time, Ogrodziński told the Canadian publisher Anna Porter: "It's a long history, rich in detail and adventure. It is time to give our past its due. Our history was stolen from us-we want it back. All of it, not only the wretched bits". The subject was especially important to him as both his parents were members of Żegota and his mother was honored as one of the Righteous Among the Nations for her work in saving Jews in wartime Lwów (modern Lviv, Ukraine). Ogrodziński stated it was time to give attention to the fact that the largest number of trees planted on the Avenue of the Righteous in Jerusalem are in honor of Polish Righteous Among the Nations.

In 2011, he was awarded by President Bronisław Komorowski with the Officer's Cross of the Order of Polonia Restituta. He also awarded the badge of Distinguished Cultural Activist. Ogrodziński is married to Joanna Kawalerowicz-Ogrodzińska and has three sons. In an interview on 12 August 2013, Ogrodziński stated that he had changed his views about civil society, saying: "If I have time to write a book properly, I would start by criticizing the concept of civil society and try to find another way of expressing certain issues other than the purely economic one...In a sense I'm proud that Poland, which did quite poorly at the Olympic games in London, did very well as far as handicapped people are concerned. The Polish people were interested in the Paralympics. People with handicaps have rights and are using their rights. So, the space for freedom has increased. The same thing is happening in this society's attitude toward women's rights and toward animal rights. A lot still must be done. But in comparison to 23 years ago, there is a much stronger understanding of the need for tolerance. That doesn't mean that everyone is tolerant, but it is a step forward".

In the same interview, Ogrodziński stated: "Generally speaking, we have a deep crisis of political elites at this point, which is incapable of producing a new concept for changing reality and to organize the political scene. This is something I’m very worried about. Reading Manuel Castells this morning, I was a little surprised that this crisis of the political elite is not just happening in Poland. It is happening in many other places. It is a sign of the present dynamic that the changes are so dramatic that it’s difficult to create a synthetic direction of where you want to go. There are too many options going in different directions". About the younger generation in Poland, Ogrodziński stated: "I’m not a teacher. It would be imprudent to make some generalizations. My impression is that young people now in Poland are in a very demanding situation that requires them to manage things that have nothing to do with what happened in the Polish People’s Republic. The main issue is to find a job. My son is now trying to find a job. He is producing CVs, resumes, letters in unbelievable numbers – several hundred. He’s using Facebook, LinkedIn. These are skills that are foreign to me, but for him it’s an issue of life and death. Perhaps that’s too strong a word. But he wants to find a job that is more or less consistent with what he learned during his studies, which is difficult."

On 6 May 2018, Ogrodziński was a founding member of the Conference of Ambassadors of the Republic of Poland, a group of 29 former Polish ambassadors of an Altanticist bent who supported Poland's membership in NATO and the EU and who feel that the current PiS government has been damaging Poland's relations with both NATO and the EU. In its founding statement, the Conference of Ambassadors declared: "Our geopolitical position forces us to choose: integration with the West or submission to the revisionist empire from the East. History has shown that daydreams about a third way in the middle of Europe lead to dire consequences. Let us not get pushed out of the European Union, let us not allow our ties with NATO to be weakened." The same letter accused Russia of sponsoring populist movements of both left and right in Europe and North America as part of a gambit to break up both the European Union and NATO. The line about "daydreams about a third way in the middle of Europe" was a reference to the Third Europe concept championed by the Polish Foreign Minister Colonel Józef Beck. In the 1930s, Beck envisioned the idea of a Polish-led bloc of eastern European states to be called Third Europe that was intended to make Poland into a world power. The concept of Third Europe faltered as Germany was the world's second largest economy at the time and all of eastern Europe was dominated economically by the Reich even before the Second World War, which led to a tendency in eastern Europe to follow the lead of Berlin rather than Warsaw.

In October 2018, Ogrodziński as part of the Conference of Ambassadors signed a public letter criticizing Jarosław Kaczyński, the leader of the conservative PiS party and Poland's de facto leader for his remarks he made in a speech about the judiciary, suggesting that Polish judges had a duty to rule in favor of Poles in cases contested with foreigners. The letter accused Kaczyński of having suggested "a new model of the administration of justice, unknown in democratic countries: Polish judges, regardless of the applicable law, should always adjudicate in favor of Poles." The letter accused Kaczyński of isolating Poland and threatening judicial independence.

In 2019, he was one of the former Polish diplomats in the Conference of Ambassadors of the Republic of Poland, who issued a public letter critical of the current Polish government that stated: "The separation of powers is being abolished, an independent judiciary is being destroyed. Human rights are being limited, and the increasing repression of political opponents and various minorities, both ethnic, religious and sexual, are tolerated not only by the government, but even inspired by it". On 22 June 2020, Ogrodziński signed a public letter on behalf of the Conference of Ambassadors criticizing the visit of President Andrzej Duda of Poland during the middle of his re-election campaign to meet President Donald Trump in Washington as violating the unwritten rule that American presidents do not meet with Polish presidents during the course of an election campaign, arguing that the visit was being portrayed as an endorsement of Duda by Trump, and thus was a sort of American interference in Polish domestic affairs.

On 9 September 2020, Ogrodziński together with Ryszard Schnepf, the former Polish ambassador to the United States and Jan Truszczyński, the former Polish ambassador to the European Union published a public letter expressing the hope that Joe Biden would win the United States presidential election, writing: "It is with great warmth and hope that we welcome your candidacy for president of the United States, a country that has played a unique role in our history. From the moment of its birth, the United States of America wanted to be a "city upon the hill" – a beacon of hope for those who desired freedom and democracy, justice and equality. This is how, as a role model, the United States was perceived by five and a half million Poles who signed a letter of thanks to the American people in 1926. For it was the United States which, after World War I, successfully raised the issue of Polish independence, and at the end of the 20th century played a vital role for us by supporting the wave of democracy in Central and Eastern Europe, shedding the yoke of communism." The letter criticized "a wave of populism" as threatening "pluralistic democracies, creating the illusion in societies that an authoritarian system can deal more effectively with current problems".

The letter denounced populist leaders, whom it criticized: "Populist leaders, cynical and irresponsible, take power by proposing an identity built on hatred of the Other: immigrant, homosexual, Jew or Muslim. They create an appearance of justice with calculated hand-outs, while at the same time allowing corruption to flourish, if it serves to strengthen their power. They awaken national egoisms, and treat international institutions and alliances with contempt, simply as a business forum where zero-sum play takes place. They destroy the international order without proposing anything other than rivalry for power in return". The letter expressed support for pro-democracy protests in Hong Kong, Venezuela, and especially Belarus, stating: "The explosion of opposition to injustices in Belarus proves that history continues and in it lives the yearning for freedom. That opposition to enslavement is an act of identity of free people. Whether it appears in Minsk, Caracas, or Hong Kong, it is worthy of our admiration, respect, and support."

On 29 September 2020, Ogrodziński signed a public letter by the Conference of Ambassadors accusing the PiS government of homophobia, which it warned was alienating public opinion around the world. The letter stated that more 50 ambassadors in Warsaw had criticized the government's statements about gay Polish people and went on to state: "President Andrzej Duda cynically used homophobia in his election campaign. From public finances, the minister of justice supports local governments which declare themselves an "LGBT-free zone" with the approval of other PiS officials. These are shameful and blameworthy actions. The current 'anti-LGBT' campaign is beginning to recall the terrifying beginnings of discrimination leading to crimes in 20th century history." About the PiS government's anti-abortion policies, Ogrodziński signed a public letter stating that "the prohibition of abortion in such a situation is classified as cruel, inhuman, degrading and discriminatory treatment, prohibited under international law".

On 18 December 2020, Ogrodziński as a member of the Conference of Ambassadors signed a public letter criticizing President Andrzej Duda as being of the world leaders together with President Vladimir Putin of Russia who took their time to congratulate Biden for winning the 2020 election, apparently out of the hope that Trump might remain in office. The letter expressed the fear that Duda might had damaged Poland's reputation in the United States, and denounced what it called Duda's "infantile friendship with Donald Trump".

In 2021, he again signed a public letter as part of the Conference of Ambassadors of the Republic of Poland stating about the 2021 Belarus–European Union border crisis: "For several weeks now, the hideous practice sponsored and organized by the Belarusian regime has been going on: living people, refugees and migrants have become, in the hands of the authorities in Minsk, a tool of migratory pressure on the European Union, including our country. For weeks our authorities have not found an appropriate and democratic response to this pressure, resorting mainly to actions closer to Belarusian "standards", while at the same time violating human rights as well as Polish and international law...The current activities de facto implement the scenario written in Minsk, which is intended to give our allies the impression that Poland is moving away from Europe and its standards. Let us not allow this idea to come true".

== Books and articles ==
- Gawin, Dariusz; Glińsk, Piotr (2006). Civil Society in the Making. Reading: IFiS Publishers. ISBN 9788373880955.
- Greenwood, Sean (2002). "Danzig: the phantom crisis, 1939". In Gordon Martel (ed.). Origins of the Second World War Reconsidered A.J.P. Taylor and the Historians. London: Taylor & Francis. pp. 225–247. ISBN 9781134714186.
- Liebich, Andre; Warner, Daniel; Dragovic, Jasna (1995). Citizenship East & West. London: Routeledge. ISBN 9781136160936.
- Pigott, Peter (2007). Canada in Afghanistan: The War So Far. Toronto: Dundurn Press. ISBN 978-1550026740.
- Porter, Anna (2010). The Ghosts of Europe Journeys Through Central Europe's Troubled Past and Uncertain Future. Toronto: Douglas and McIntyre. ISBN 9781553656371.
- Ogrodziński, Piotr (March–April 2008). "Poland's march to freedom". Diplomatica. 19 (1): 14–16.
- Szacki, Jerzy (1995). Liberalism After Communism The Implications of the 1993 Elections to the Federal Assembly. Budapest: Central European University Press. ISBN 9781858660158.
- Walt, Stephen (2011). "Alliances in an unipolar world". In G. John Ikenberry; Michael Mastanduno; William C. Wohlforth (eds.). International Relations Theory and the Consequences of Unipolarity. Cambridge: Cambridge University Press. pp. 99–139. ISBN 978-1139501644.
