= Przemysław Ogrodziński =

Polish diplomat and activist

Przemysław Antoni Ogrodziński
- Born: 4 May 1918; Lemberg, Galicia, Austria-Hungary
- Died: 11 May 1980 (aged 62); Warsaw, Warsaw Voivodeship, Polish People's Republic
- Resting place: Powązki Military Cemetery, Warsaw
- Other name: Przemek
- Occupation: Diplomat
- Years active: 1939–1975
- Known for: Saving Jews during the Holocaust; Ambassador to India (1962–1967); Ambassador to Norway (1969–1975)
- Spouse: Halina Jacuńska
- Children: Piotr Ogrodziński

Przemysław Antoni Ogrodziński (4 May 1918 – 11 May 1980), also known by his pseudonyms 'Stanisław', 'Dyplomata', and 'Agapit' was a Polish diplomat and activist.

== Early life ==
Przemysław "Przemek" Ogrodziński was born to a Polish family in Lemberg (modern Lviv, Ukraine) in the Austrian Empire. Lemberg was the capital of the Austrian province of Galicia, a region that spanned modern southeastern Poland and western Ukraine. Galicia was populated by a mixture of Poles, Ukrainians, and Yiddish-speaking Ashkenazi Jews. Shortly after Ogrodziński's birth, Galicia became part of the newly re-established Poland and Lemberg became the Polish city of Lwów.

Ogrodziński graduated in law from Jagiellonian University in Kraków, before returning to his hometown of Lwów, where he became active in the Związek Niezależnej Młodzieży Socjalistycznej (Union of Independent Socialist Youth). As an young socialist activist in Lwów, Ogrodziński had many Jewish friends who were active in the Socialist movement.

== Occupation and the Underground ==
In September 1939, the Soviet Union joined Germany in invading Poland. Polish Galicia was annexed to the Soviet Ukraine and Lwów was again renamed, now as Lvov. Under Soviet rule, Ogrodziński together with his father were imprisoned under charges of falsifying documents.

In June 1941, Germany invaded the USSR and captured the Soviet half of Poland on the way. The Germans restored the Galician capital's Austrian name: Lemberg. Under the German occupation, Ogrodziński became involved in resistance activities, as a member of the Polish Socialist Party – Freedom, Equality, Independence and as the editor of the underground socialist newspaper O wolność i niezależność (For Freedom and Independence). Under the German occupation, the entire Jewish population of the city was forced to live in a ghetto, in dismal conditions. In August 1941, Ogrodziński assisted with the publication of an underground newspaper in the ghetto: Lwowski Tygodnik,. In May 1943, Ogrodziński was a founding member of the Lwów branch of Żegota, the Council to Aid Jews. He served as the treasurer to the local branch of Żegota that sought to hide Jews outside the ghetto and smuggle food to those still inside the ghetto. Working closely with the local chairwoman of Żegota, Władysława Choms, later known as the "Angel of Lvov", Ogrodziński worked to obtain the money that bought the extra food for the ghetto and which bought materials to make the false papers for Jews to escape the ghetto.

During his dangerous work for Żegota, Ogrodziński adopted the alias 'Stanisław'. Many Ukrainians in Lemberg believed the Reich would establish an independent Ukrainian state after its expected "final victory" and the city became a dangerous place in which to operate. The Polish historian Teresa Prekerowa wrote the sheer number of Ukrainian collaborators in the city made Lemberg a particularly dangerous city for Polish resistance work. On 3 June 1943, the Germans liquidated the Lemberg ghetto, sending in Ukrainian police units to round up most of the Jews. They were sent to the Belzec death camp, where almost all of them were exterminated immediately on arrival. A few thousand "work Jews" (skilled laborers) were retained at a camp on Janowska street until October 1943, when they were killed in turn. Żegota's work was limited to helping the few hundred Jews who had escaped from either the ghetto or the Janowska street camp. It cost about 500 złotys to support one Jew in hiding per month. Despite the difficulties, it is estimated that Ogrodziński as the treasurer of the Lwów branch of Żegota was able to extend financial assistance to between 100–200 Jews living in hiding in the city.

During this time, Ogrodziński married a fellow Żegota worker, Halina Jacuńska-Ogrodzińska. She later recalled: "Żegota had its headquarters in Warsaw, under the auspices of the underground government which represented several political groupings. In Lvov there was a parallel union of political parties. Przemek acted on behalf of the PPS. The PPS played an important role because, among other things, it had a lot of Jewish members...we sent as many people as possible away from Lvov. We needed documents [fake identity cards, called ‘Aryan papers’] for this."

At considerable risk to her life, Halina Jacuńska-Ogrodzińska hid two Jewish women, Maria Glass and Olga Lilien, for she which was recognized by the Yad Vashem Institute in Jerusalem as one of Righteous Among the Nations on 28 June 1979.

== The People's Republic of Poland and Diplomacy ==
On 27 July 1944, Lemberg was recaptured by the Red Army and its name reverted to Lvov; the region was incorporated into the Soviet Union. In October 1944, Ogrodziński became a member of OMTUR (Oganizacja Mlodziezowa Towarzystwa Uniwersytetu Robotniczego-Youth Organization of the Workers' University Society). On 31 December 1944, Ogrodziński became a member of the State National Council. He served as a member of the National Council's Foreign Affairs Committee.

== Rome and Paris ==
In 1945, Ogrodziński joined the Polish diplomatic corps and served as a counselor in the Polish embassy in Rome. The Polish 2nd Corps had served as part of the British 8th Army in Italy, and Ogrodziński's main duty in Rome was to persuade members of the 2nd Corps to return to Poland instead of staying in exile in the West. In 1948, he returned to Poland to take part in the congress that united the Polish Workers' Party and the Polish Socialist Party into the Polish United Workers' Party, which was the official name of the Communist Party. In 1951, he was awarded 2nd Class Knight's Officer in the Order of the Banner of Labour.

On 10 July 1952, he became the chargé d'affaires at the Polish embassy in Paris, serving as the de facto head of the Polish embassy until the spring of 1954, as the Polish ambassador to France was absent. In Paris, Ogrodziński was keen to capitalise on the weakening relations between France and the United States. His opportunity came with the proposed European Defence Community (EDC) which would permit West German rearmament, a subject arousing fierce opposition in France at the time. Working closely with Sergei Vinogradov, the Soviet ambassador in Paris, Ogrodziński sought to maximise the traditional French sympathy for Poland to make the case that the EDC was a reckless move, endangering the peace of Europe. Ogrodziński also claimed in talks with the French officials that the United States, by forcefully supporting West German rearmament, was a danger to all of Europe. As part of his diplomacy, Ogrodziński cultivated French politicians, reminding them of the historical Franco-Polish friendship going back centuries, and in December 1953 arranged for the visit of a group of National Assembly members to Poland. The French delegation was co-headed by the former premier, Édouard Daladier, and Jacques Soustelle. As Soustelle was close to General Charles de Gaulle at the time, Ogrodziński felt that Soustelle's visit to Poland was a sign that the Gaullists were sympathetic to the anti-EDC forces. In July 1954, the French National Assembly rejected the EDC treaty with the general feeling in France being that it was too dangerous to allow West Germany to have a military again so soon after the end of World War Two.

== The International Control Commission ==
From 1954 to 1956, Ogrodziński served as the first Polish Commissioner to the International Control Commission (ICC). The ICC supervised the Geneva Accords in Vietnam and comprised three delegations, from: Poland, Canada and India, with the Indian Commissioner serving as the Chief Commissioner of the ICC. Ogrodziński was given much leeway to operate in the manner that he felt best on the ICC, and contrary to expectations held in the West, he did not consult much with Moscow, Beijing or Warsaw before making a decision. Ogrodziński was informed "that the Indians must not be antagonized" as India's socialist neutralism was felt to make the Indians favorable to the Soviet bloc, but he was told to expect the worse from the Canadians whom it was believed were serving "agencies of the US".

The first conference of the ICC in New Delhi on 1–6 August 1954 did not bring about the expected Canadian-Polish clash. The government of Prime Minister Louis St. Laurent was reluctant to have Canada involved in the ICC and only agreed under heavy American pressure. As a consequence, the Canadians wanted to keep their delegation as small as possible. The Poles also wanted to keep their delegation small owning largely to a shortage of diplomats and soldiers with the necessary knowledge of French and English. Thus, for different reasons, at the first meeting of the ICC, both the Poles and Canadians found themselves in agreement about the size of the ICC.

On 18 August 1954, the ICC began its work in Vietnam. Ogrodziński reported to Warsaw that the authorities in both Vietnams did not provide the ICC delegations with offices to work in with meetings being held in the hotel rooms of the delegates, which he reported as having "improved the atmosphere". Right from the start, Ogrodziński complained that he needed more delegates who were fluent in French and English. Ogrodziński noted that all of the Indian delegates were fluent in English and some of the Canadian delegation were French-Canadian, and even the majority who were English-Canadian usually spoke good French. He wrote that everything the Polish delegation achieved was made possible "at the expense of simply unbelievable improvisations". A particular problem were the uniforms provided to the Polish delegation, which were not designed for the tropics and which disintegrated after being run through the washing machine a couple of times.

One of the Canadian diplomats called Ogrodziński "a formidable opponent" and "the Polish version of Machiavelli". Another Canadian diplomat recalled: "He impressed us as able and forceful, and he also has charm, a dangerous combination". The acting Canadian Commissioner, R.M. Macdonnell, pressed for the Communist Viet Minh to release all of their French prisoners of war (POW) swiftly, but Ogrodziński sided with the Viet Minh who stated they would release the POWs slowly. Despite the tensions with the Canadian delegation, Ogrodziński reported with some surprise to Warsaw that: "you cannot see pro-American tendencies in the Canadians (which is extremely interesting)". He also reported that relations with other delegations were good, writing: an "Idyll of unanimity continues in the Commission".

== Director-General ==
From 1956 to 1962 Ogrodziński was the Director-General of the Ministry of Foreign Affairs, making him the number three man in the Foreign Ministry. The new Polish Foreign Minister, Adam Rapacki, was one of the leaders of the more liberal side of the Communist party, but most of the team he selected were people who had loyally served the Stalinist regime. Ogrodziński had loyally served the Stalinist faction prior to 1956, but after 1956 as Rapacki's right-hand man he became associated with the liberalizing faction in the Communist Party. The Polish historian Wŀodzimier Borodziej described Ogrodziński as typical of the Polish generation whose formative life experiences were the German occupation in World War Two. For many of Ogrodziński's generation, the refusal of the West German government, established in 1949, to recognize the Oder-Neisse line as Poland's western frontier, whilst maintaining a territorial claim to various territories now part of Poland, looked alarmingly similar to the refusal of successive German governments, in the interwar period, to recognize the eastern frontiers of Germany established by the Treaty of Versailles. The fact that many of the officials in the West German government were men who had loyally served the Nazi regime added to the Polish concerns regarding West Germany. Thus, for Ogrodziński and many other Poles, the perceived threat of German irredentism and revanchism caused them to look for the Soviet Union as a counterweight, all the more so as the United States and other Western powers had allied themselves with West Germany and did not criticize the West German refusal to accept the Oder-Neisse line. Ogrodziński saw the Soviet domination of Poland as a lesser evil compared to the possibility of a return to a neo-Nazi occupation.

Ogrodziński as a director-general at the Foreign Ministry was very close to Rapacki, serving as one as his principle advisers. The background of Ogrodziński as a socialist turned communist from Galicia was exactly the same as Rapacki, who saw him as a kindred spirit. Rapacki was a self-described "socialist humanist" who spent much of World War Two in a German POW camp and who had reluctantly joined the Communist Party in 1948. Like Ogrodziński, Rapacki's World War Two experiences had convinced him that Germany was a far greater threat to Poland than the Soviet Union, and through Rapacki was known for wanting Poland to have greater independence from Moscow and for greater freedom of expression within Poland, he was convinced that Poland needed the Soviet Union to counter the perceived threat of German revanchism.

In 1957, the administration of President Dwight Eisenhower complained the United States was bearing a disproportionate amount of the costs associated with the North Atlantic Treaty Organization (NATO), and publicity suggested perhaps the United States should transfer nuclear weapons to West Germany as a way to force the western European states to spend more on NATO. Through Eisenhower's gambit was intended to force greater defense spending in western Europe, in Warsaw the mere suggestion that the United States was going to arm West Germany with nuclear weapons provoked immense fear as the Poles were convinced that the West Germans would use nuclear weapons against them sooner or later to take back the lands east of the Oder-Neisse line. To preempt this possibility, Rapacki together with several officials at the Foreign Ministry such as Ogrodziński developed the Rapacki Plan calling for Central Europe to be a nuclear weapons free zone. Ogrodziński was described by the Polish historian Piotr Wandycz as one of the "fathers of the Rapacki plan".

Under the Rapacki plan, no nuclear weapons nor missiles capable of firing nuclear weapons would be allowed in both Germanies, Poland and Czechoslovakia. From the Polish perspective, the Rapacki plan had the additional advantage of keeping the Soviet Union from stationing nuclear weapons in Poland, which would mean that in the event of World War Three, that there would be no American nuclear strikes to destroy them, thereby limiting the amount of nuclear fall-out in Poland. Many in the West assumed the Rapacki Plan was a Soviet diplomatic initiative, but in fact, it was a Polish diplomatic initiative, through permission still had to be asked of Moscow first. During his talks with East German officials about the Rapacki Plan, Ogrodziński rejected any joint East German-Polish diplomatic offensive, telling the East German diplomat Otto Winzer that the chances of the Rapacki plan being accepted by the West would be greater if it was seen as a purely Polish diplomatic initiative.

== India ==
In a demotion, Ogrodziński was appointed the Polish ambassador to India. Despite his removal to New Delhi, Ogrodziński still retained influence as one of the favorite advisers to Rapacki. Because an Indian diplomat always served as the Chief Commissioner of the ICC, the Polish Foreign Ministry attached much importance to relations with India in the 1960s, and Ogrodziński was appointed ambassador in New Delhi largely because Rapacki wanted an able diplomat whom he could trust as the ambassador to India. On 24 September 1962, Ogrodziński presented his credentials to President Rajendra Prasad of India at the Rashtrapati Bhavan in New Delhi. From February–June 1963, he also served as the Polish ambassador to Ceylon (modern Sri Lanka).

As an ambassador, Ogrodziński was involved in the Marigold negotiations, an attempt in 1966 to end the Vietnam war. During the Marigold talks, Ogrodziński was in regular contact with Roland Michener, the Canadian high commissioner in New Delhi, as proposals were made to have a conference chaired by the ICC powers. Ogrodziński advised Warsaw to "express our consent", as rejecting the proposal would "strengthen Rightist tendencies" in the Indian government, while accepting it "could be played out to show that the rigidity of the Canadians makes it impossible to come to an understanding".

== Norway ==
In 1968, in the aftermath of the "March Events", Ogrodziński refused to join the "anti-Zionist" campaign that saw a number of Polish Jews sacked from their jobs. Rapacki was sacked in 1968, and Ogrodziński's career went into decline with his sacking. In another demotion, Ogrodziński was appointed ambassador to Norway. On 10 June 1969, Ogrodziński presented his credentials as Poland's ambassador to King Olav V of Norway at the Royal Palace, Oslo. He was also appointed the Polish ambassador to Iceland. On 15 October 1969, he traveled to Reykjavík to present his credentials to President Kristján Eldjárn at the Bessastaðir. He served as the Polish ambassador to Norway and Iceland until his retirement in May 1975.

== Family life ==
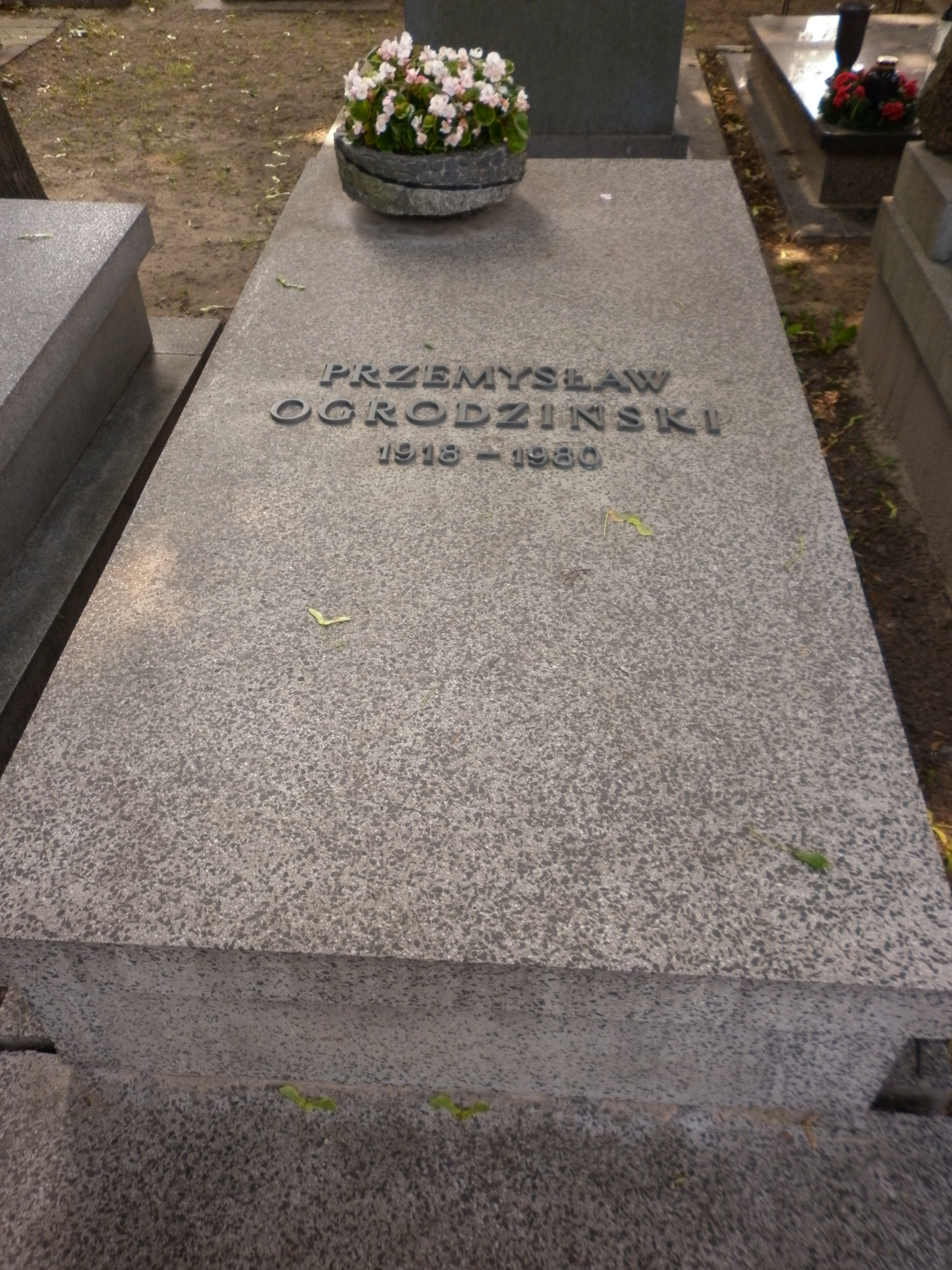
Ogrodziński's grave in Warsaw

Halina and Przemek had a son called Piotr, who also became a diplomat and who served as the Polish ambassador to Canada, 2004–2009. Przemysław Ogrodziński died in 1980.

== Books and articles ==
- Anderson, Sheldon (2010). "The German Question and Polish-East German Relations, 1945-1962". In Tobias Hochscherf; Christoph Laucht; Andrew Plowman (eds.). Divided, But Not Disconnected: German Experiences of the Cold War. Oxford: Berghahn Books. pp. 99–104. ISBN 978-1845456467.
- Borodziej, Wŀodzimier (2007). "1956 As a turning point in Poland's foreign policy". In Jan Rowiński; Tytus Jaskułowski (eds.). The Polish October 1956 in World Politics. Warsaw: Polski Instytut Spraw Międzynarodowych. pp. 327–346. ISBN 978-8389607218.
- Czarnecki, Wacław; Durko, Janusz; Hałoń, Edward (1994). Polska Partia Socjalistyczna w latach wojny i okupacji 1939-1945: księga wspomnień. Warsaw: Polska Fundacja Upowszechniania Nauki. ISBN 8385618155.
- Hershberg, James (2012). Marigold: The Lost Chance for Peace in Vietnam. Stanford: Stanford University Press. ISBN 978-0804783880.
- Kelly, Brendan (2019). The Good Fight: Marcel Cadieux and Canadian Diplomacy. Vancouver: University of British Columbia Press. ISBN 978-0774860024.
- Khonigsman, Iakov Samoĭlovich (1997). The Catastrophy of Jewry in Lvov. Lviv: Solom-Aleichem Jewish Society of Culture.
- Lewinówna, Zofia (1969). Righteous among Nations: How Poles helped the Jews, 1939-1945. London: Earlscourt Publications Ltd.
- Pasztor, Marie (2007). "France and the Polish October of 1956". In Jan Rowiński; Tytus Jaskułowski (eds.). The Polish October 1956 in World Politics. Warsaw: Polski Instytut Spraw Międzynarodowych. pp. 263–276. ISBN 978-8389607218.
- Piekałkiewicz, Jarosław (2019). Dance with Death: A Holistic View of Saving Polish Jews during the Holocaust. Lanthan: Rowman & Littlefield. ISBN 978-0761871675.
- Prekerowa, Teresa (1982). Konspiracyjna Rada Pomocy Żydom w Warszawie 1942-1945. Warsaw.
- Ross, Douglas Alan (1984). In the Interests of Peace: Canada and Vietnam, 1954-1973. Toronto: University of Toronto Press. ISBN 0802056326.
- Słowiak, Jarema (2014). "Working with the Enemy: Polish Perception of the Canadian Delegation in the International Commission for Supervision and Control in Vietnam". TransCanadiana (7): 49–61.
- Stępień, Stefan (1998). Związek Parlamentarny Polskich Socjalistów w działalności prawodawczej Krajowej Rady Narodowej. Lublin.
- Sulmicka, Małgorzata (2002). "Problem ubóstwa w Afryce Subsaharyjskiej". Sprawy Międzynarodowe. 59 (4): 101–122.
- Szczepanik, A.; Herman-Łukasik, B; Janicka, B. (2007). Stosunki dyplomatyczne Polski. Informator. Tom I. Europa 1918-2006. Warsaw: Askon.
- Wandycz, Piotr (1994). "Adam Rapacki and the Search for European Security". In Gordon A. Craig; Francis L. Loewenheim (eds.). The Diplomats, 1939-1979. Princeton: Princeton University Press. pp. 289–318. ISBN 0691194467.
- Węgierski, Jerzy (1989). W lwowskiej Armii Krajowej. Warsaw: Instytut Wydawniczy Pax. ISBN 8321110444.
- Urzyńska, Dorota (2000). Polski ruch socjalistyczny na obczyźnie w latach 1939-1945. Poznań.
- Zimmerman, Joshua (2015). The Polish Underground and the Jews, 1939–1945. Cambridge: Cambridge University Press. ISBN 978-1107014268.
