= Władysław Ogrodziński =

Polish historian and writer

Władysław Ogrodziński (Polish pronunciation: [vwaˈdɨswaf ɔɡrɔˈd͡ʑij̃skʲi]; 2 June 1918 – 6 February 2012) was a Polish historian and writer. He was known by the pseudonym Stefan Sulima.

Ogrodziński was born in Dolyna, the son of Wincenty Ogrodziński. He studied law and history at the Jagiellonian University, graduating from the Faculty of History. During World War II he was arrested and imprisoned in Auschwitz-Birkenau. In the years 1945-1952 he was a research fellow at the Polish Academy of Sciences.

Ogrodziński debuted as an essayist and reporter in 1946 in a weekly Katowicean publication "Odra" under the pseudonym Stefan Sulima. Since 1956 he lived in Olsztyn. In 1957-1960, Ogrodziński was the head of the Department of Culture of the Provincial National Council.

In 1970-1983, Ogrodziński served as Secretary General of Poland's Centre for Scientific Research, as well as the director of the Museum of Warmia and Mazury. In the 1980s, he was the chairman of the Provincial Council PRON in Olsztyn and a member of the National Committee of Grunwald in 1986-1989.

Ogrodziński was appointed an honorary member of the Polish Tourist Association in June 1981.

== Works ==
- Ziemia odnalezionych przeznaczen (1947)
- Przypomniane piórem 1982
- Literatura o Warmii i Mazurach 1945-1960 (1960)
- Bursztynowym szlakiem. Warmia i Mazury w prozie i poezji (1963)
- Krajobraz z Tarniną (1969)
- Ulica zwana Bystrą (1985)
- Za gwiazdą betlejemską (1989)
- Proporzec z Białym Barankiem (1975)
