= Vovchynets, Ivano-Frankivsk Oblast =

Rural locality in Ivano-Frankivsk Oblast, Ukraine

Vovchynets Вовчинець
- Village
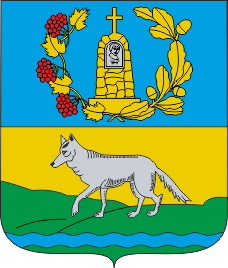
- Coat of arms

- Location of Vovchynets, Ivano-Frankivsk Oblast
- Coordinates: 48°57′06″N 24°44′46″E
- Country: Ukraine
- Oblast: Ivano-Frankivsk Oblast
- Raion: Ivano-Frankivsk Raion
- Village: est. 1469

Government
  - Head of village council: Mykhailo Nazar

Area
  - Total: 7.89 km^{2} (3.05 sq mi)
- Elevation: 228 m (748 ft)

Population (2001)
  - Total: 2,647
  - Density: 335.7/km^{2} (869/sq mi)
- Postal code: 76491
- Area code: 380 03422
- Website: http://vovchynets.if.ua/

Vovchynets (Ukrainian: Вовчинець, Polish: Wołczyniec) is a village in Ivano-Frankivsk Raion, Ukraine. It belongs to Ivano-Frankivsk urban hromada, one of the hromadas of Ukraine. Vovchynets was founded in 1469.

The village is located right next to the city of Ivano-Frankivsk bordering it at the northern side. The village is located at the confluence of three local rivers, Bystrytsia of Nadvirna, Bystrytsia of Solotvyn, and Vorona. Another important geographical feature in the vicinity is the Vovchynets Mount. The mount covers an area of 30 hectares (74 acres). The rivers serve as a natural border for the village at all directions except of southern. Westward of the village across the Bystrytsia of Solotvyn are located villages of Uhryniv and Kluziv, eastward across Bystrytsia of Nadvirna and Vorona - Pidluzhia. A little further to the north is located a village of Kolodiivka. Until 1952 Vovchynets used to border other villages of Knyahynyn and Pasichna that eventually were incorporated into Ivano-Frankivsk.

Until 18 July 2020, Vovchynets belonged to Ivano-Frankivsk Municipality. The municipality was abolished in July 2020 as part of the administrative reform of Ukraine, which reduced the number of raions of Ivano-Frankivsk Oblast to six. The area of Ivano-Frankivsk Municipality was merged into Ivano-Frankivsk Raion.

== Notable personalities ==
- Mykhailo Ivanovych Debenko, a political figure of the early 20th century. In 1865 he built a local church that became a cultural benchmark of the village. He also built one of the first monuments of Taras Shevchenko in Prykarpattya. Debenko as a member of the local Ukrainian Radical Party, closely worked with such other Ukrainian personalities as Mykhailo Vytvytsky, Dmytro Vitovsky, and others.
- Myroslav Borysyuk (1912 - 1987), a deputy of Verkhovna Rada of the Ukrainian SSR, head of the Oblast Department of Education, veteran of the Nazi Germany Armed Forces Halychyna Division, doctor of Classical Philology from the Columbia University (his doctor's dissertation was published in "Newsweek"), awarded a golden medal and a diploma signed by the Pope John Paul II, professor of Harvard University.
