= Chukalivka =

Village in Ivano-Frankivsk Oblast, Ukraine

Chukalivka Чукалівка
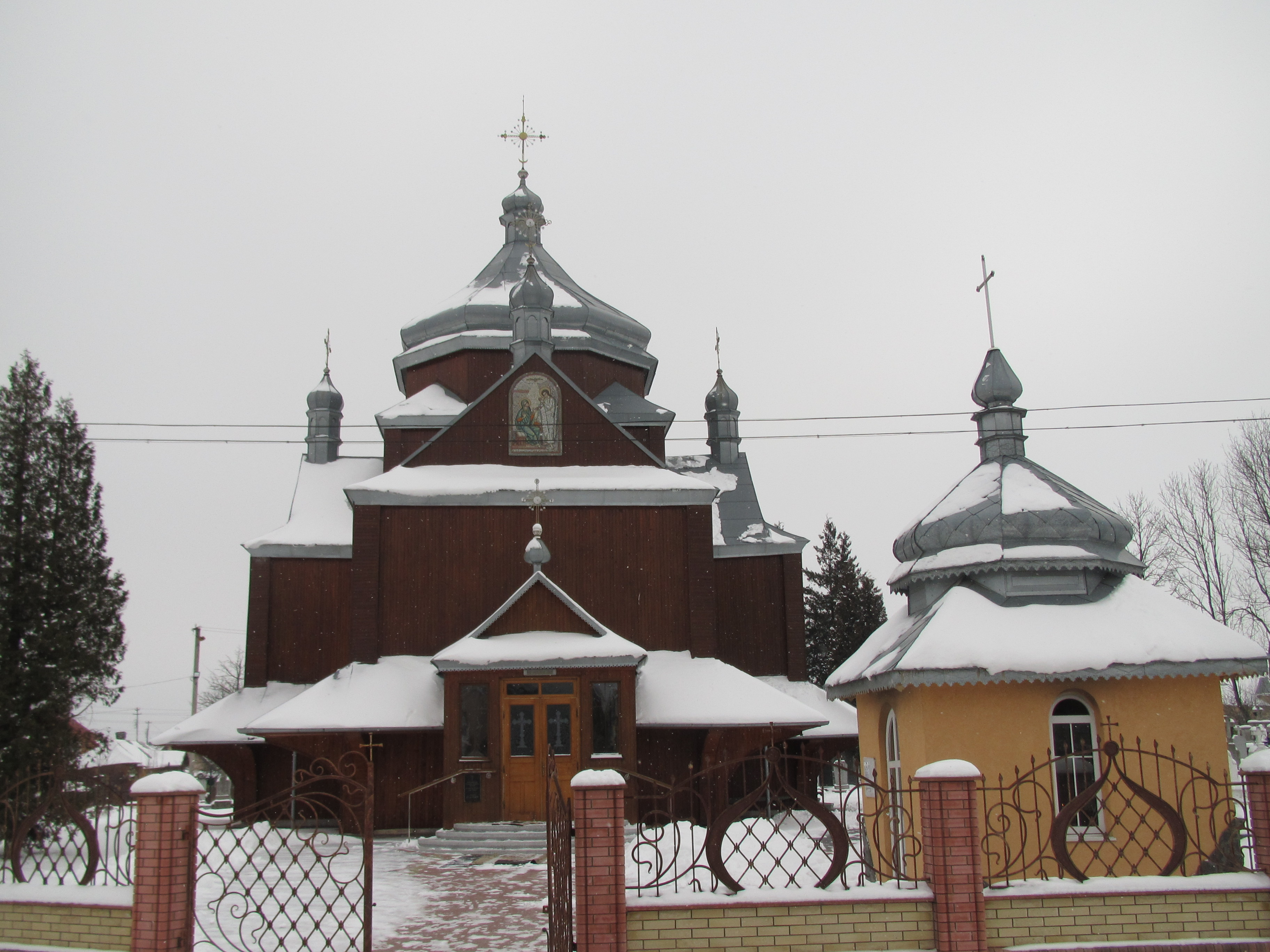
- Church of the Annunciation in Chukalivka

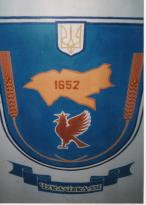
- Coat of arms
- Interactive map of Chukalivka
- Location in Ivano-Frankivsk Oblast
- Coordinates: 48°52′5″N 24°41′23″E
- Country: Ukraine
- Oblast: Ivano-Frankivsk Oblast
- Raion: Ivano-Frankivsk Raion
- Hromada: Ivano-Frankivsk urban hromada

Population (2001)
  - Total: 1,407
- Time zone: UTC+2 (EET)
  - Summer (DST): UTC+3 (EEST)
- Postal code: 77458

Chukalivka (Ukrainian: Чукалівка) is a village in the Ivano-Frankivsk urban hromada of the Ivano-Frankivsk Raion of Ivano-Frankivsk Oblast in Ukraine.

It is home to the Main City Cemetery of Ivano-Frankivsk, where many notable figures are buried.

After the liquidation of the Tysmenytsia Raion on 19 July 2020, the village became part of the Ivano-Frankivsk Raion.

== Notable people ==
- Ivan Blavatskyi (1887–1963), Ukrainian Greek Catholic priest and public figure, lived in the village.
- Olha Duchyminska (1883–1988), Ukrainian writer and activist, buried in the local cemetery.

== Bibliography ==
- "Czukałówka". Geographical Dictionary of the Kingdom of Poland (in Polish). 1. Warszawa: Kasa im. Józefa Mianowskiego. 1880. p. 880.
