= Volodymyr Shpilchak =

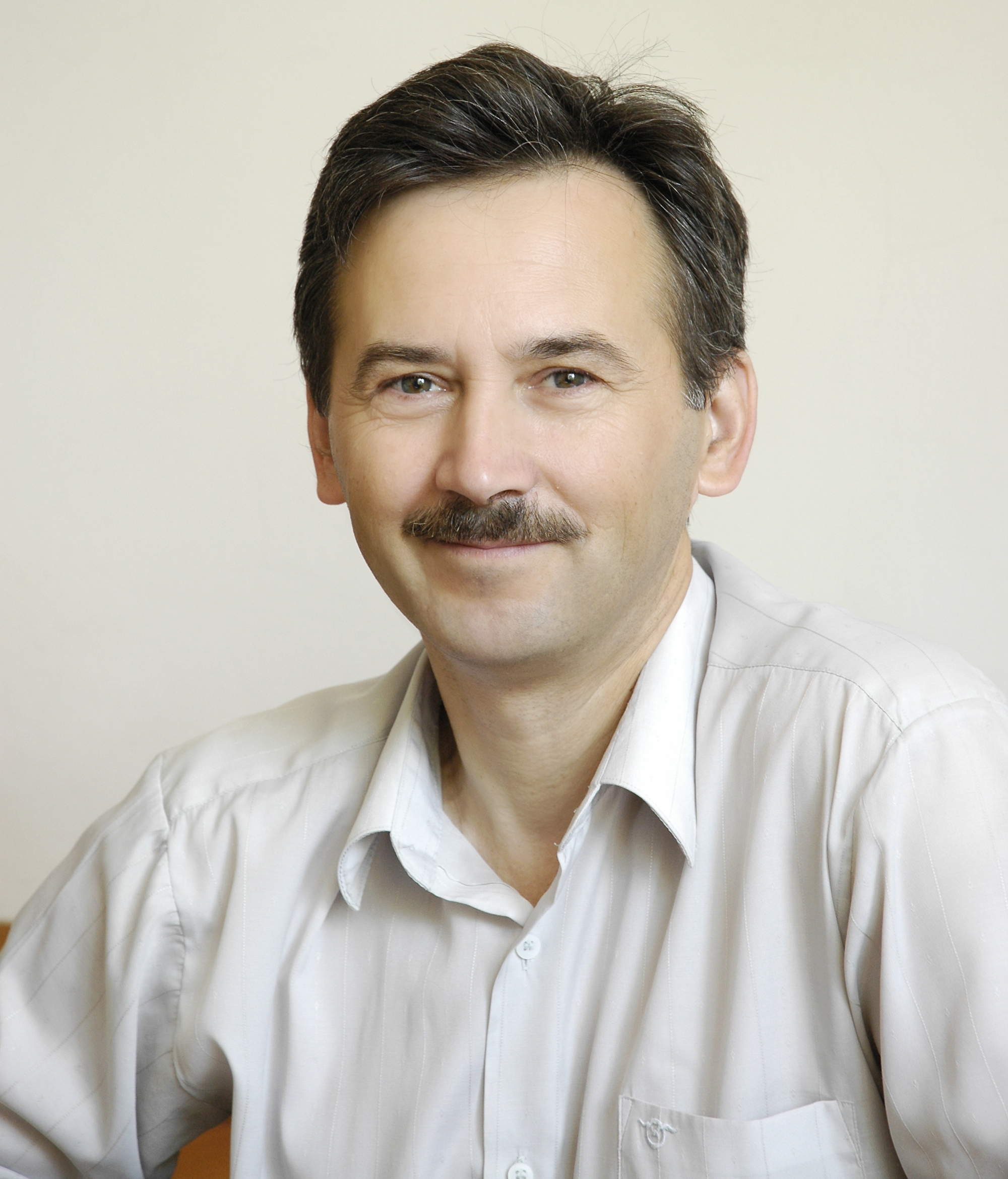
- Shpilchak in 2007
- Born: August 12, 1959 (age 67); Khor settlement, Khabarovsk Krai, Russia
- Citizenship: Ukraine
- Education: Lviv Polytechnic National University
- Awards: Honorary Diplomas of the Selective Committee of Designers of Ukraine (2007,2009), Honorary Badge "For the Development of Education" (2007), Honorary Badge "For the Development of Design"(2012), medal of the Vasyl Stefanyk Precarpathian National University "For Merit to the University (2019), medal of the All-Ukrainian Society "Prosvita" named after Taras Shevchenko "Builder of Ukraine" (2025)
- Scientific career
- Thesis: (Candidate of Pedagogical Sciences (1992), Associate Professor (1994)
- Doctoral advisor: Andriy Rudnitskyi
- Notable students: Khrystyna Kit, Oleksandr Haleta

Volodymyr Shpilchak (ukr. Володимир Шпільчак, b. August 12, 1959, Khor, Khabarovsk Krai, Russia) is a Ukrainian scientist, architect and educator. Candidate of Pedagogical Sciences (1992), Associate Professor (1994). For many years (1999–2012), he chaired the board of the Ivano-Frankivsk Regional Branch of the Union of Designers of Ukraine, making a significant contribution to the development of local design and architecture. He is currently active in teaching, research, and methodology, and has authored numerous academic papers and textbooks on environmental design and ethnodesign.

== Biography ==
He was born into a family of victims of Soviet political repression, deported from Ukraine to Siberia. Even during their exile in the urban-type settlement of Khor, Khabarovsk Krai, Yevheniya Mykolaivna worked as a chemistry teacher. Following the family's return to their homeland in 1964, both parents worked together at the Vorokhta Secondary School. There, his artist father, Anton Vasylovych Shpilchak, taught children fine arts and drawing, while his mother, Yevheniya Mykolaivna Shpilchak (née Koltysh-Lagotska), taught chemistry.

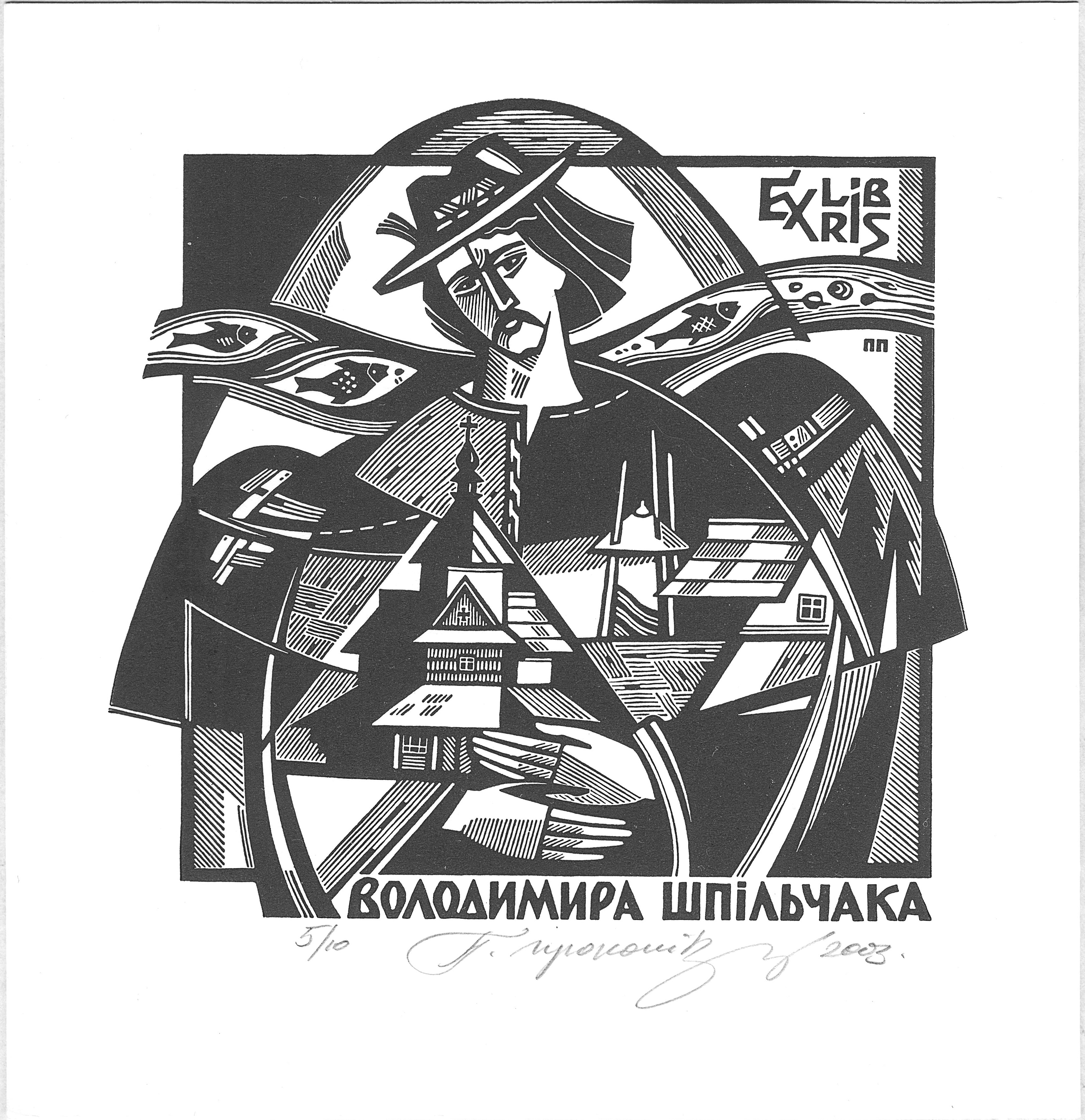
Volodymyr Shpilchak's Ex-libris by Petro Prokopiv, 2003

Volodymyr Shpilchak began painting under the tutelage of his father, an artist, and later perfected his skills en plein air among his father's fellow artists.The creative atmosphere, the scent of paint, and the sincerity of communication turned their home into a regular meeting place for like-minded people who wanted to relax and share ideas in a relaxed atmosphere. In the evenings, Volodymyr Shpilchak learned to play chess by watching his father, because this game was held in high esteem in their family.

Volodymyr Shpilchak graduated from the Vorokhta Secondary School and the Faculty of Architecture of the Lwiw Polytechnic (1981) with a degree in architecture. His teachers included: Andriy Rudnitskyi, Bohdan Posatskyi, Roman Lipka, Ivan Petryshyn and Bohdan Skiba.

In the early 1980s, Shpilchak joined the creation of the Yosafat Kobrynskyi National Museum of Hutsulshchyna and Pokuttia Folk Art.

Since 1985, he has been a lecturer in the art department of the Department of Fine, Decorative, Applied Arts, and Drawing at the Ivano-Frankivsk Pedagogical Institute named after Vasyl Stefanyk. He completed postgraduate studies at the Research Institute of Artistic Education of the USSR Academy of Pedagogical Sciences in Moscow (1987–1991) and successfully defended his PhD dissertation.

In 1994, together with renowned architect Igor Garkot, he joined the creation of the region's first architectural magazine, "Svoya Khata", which was published on a voluntary basis and received positive reviews from experts and the general readership. From 1995 to 1998, V. Shpilchak served as the magazine's editor-in-chief.

In 2011, he published the popular science book "Stanislaviv — Ivano-Frankivsk. The Ancient and Modern City" (co-authored with Z. Sokolovskyi and M. Mykhailo Holovatyi). This popular science book examines the most important historical events and moments in the Ivano-Frankivsk region. It explores the development of the central city's architecture and describes its main streets and buildings. For the convenience of foreign readers, a summary of the English and Polish languages is provided.

Under the guidance of Volodymyr Shpilchak, Associate Professor of the Department of Design and Art Theory, Master's student Khrystyna Kit won the International Competition for Young Designers (First-Degree Diploma). She developed a unique landscape design for the park area of the city lake in Ivano-Frankivsk.

Volodymyr Shpilchak is the author of personal painting exhibitions in Ivano-Frankivsk (2012, 2019), and participated in group art exhibitions.

=== Family ===
- Wife Halyna (née Humenna; 1959–2021) was a primary school teacher at a boarding school for orphans.
- Daughter Ulyana Melnyk (born 1988) has been working as an architect at the Architecture and Planning Bureau of the Department of Architecture and Urban Development since 2010, a lecturer at the Department of Design and Art Theory (2012 — 2022); a lecturer at the Department of Hotel, Restaurant and Resort Management (2022 — 2023) at the Vasyl Stefanyk Precarpathian National University.

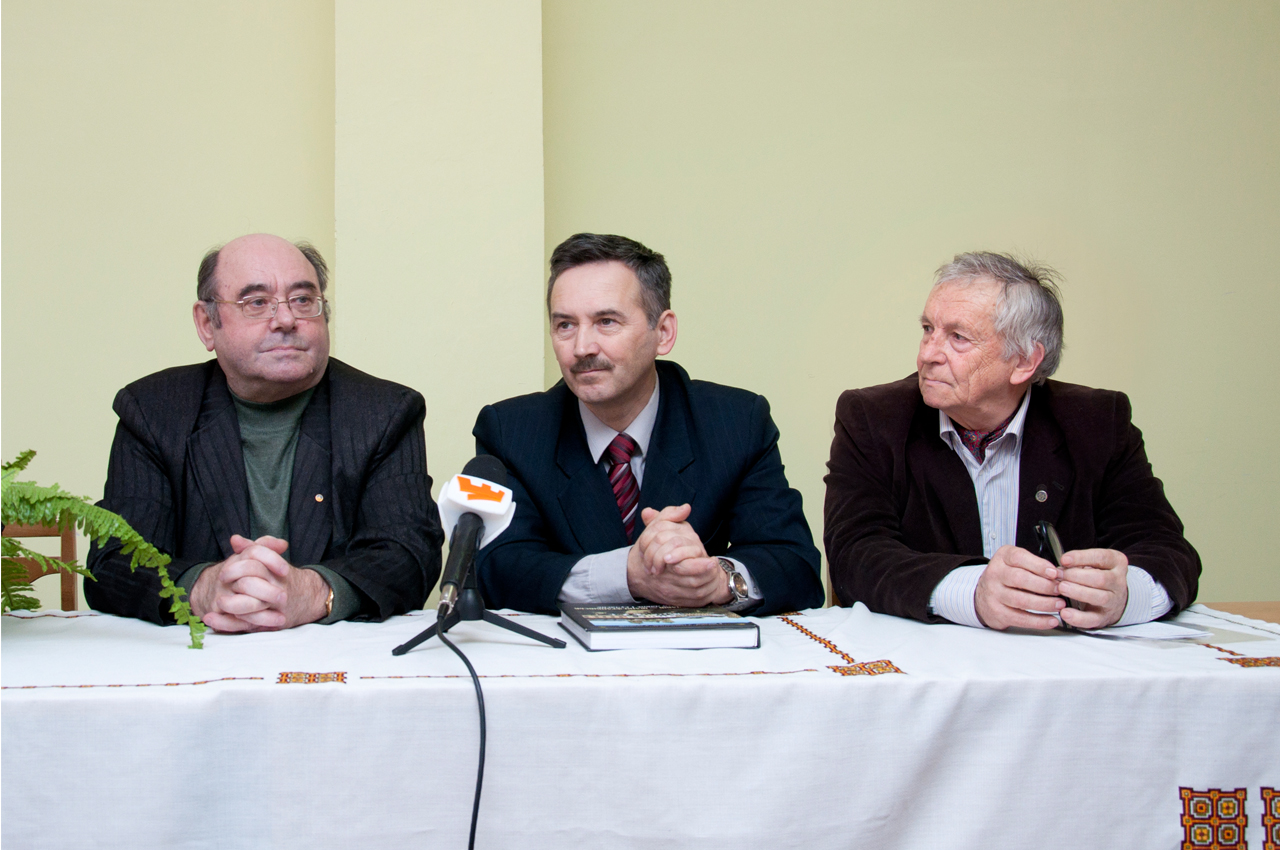
(left to right) Mikhailo Golovaty, Volodymyr Shpilchak, Zenoviy Sokolovsky (2011)

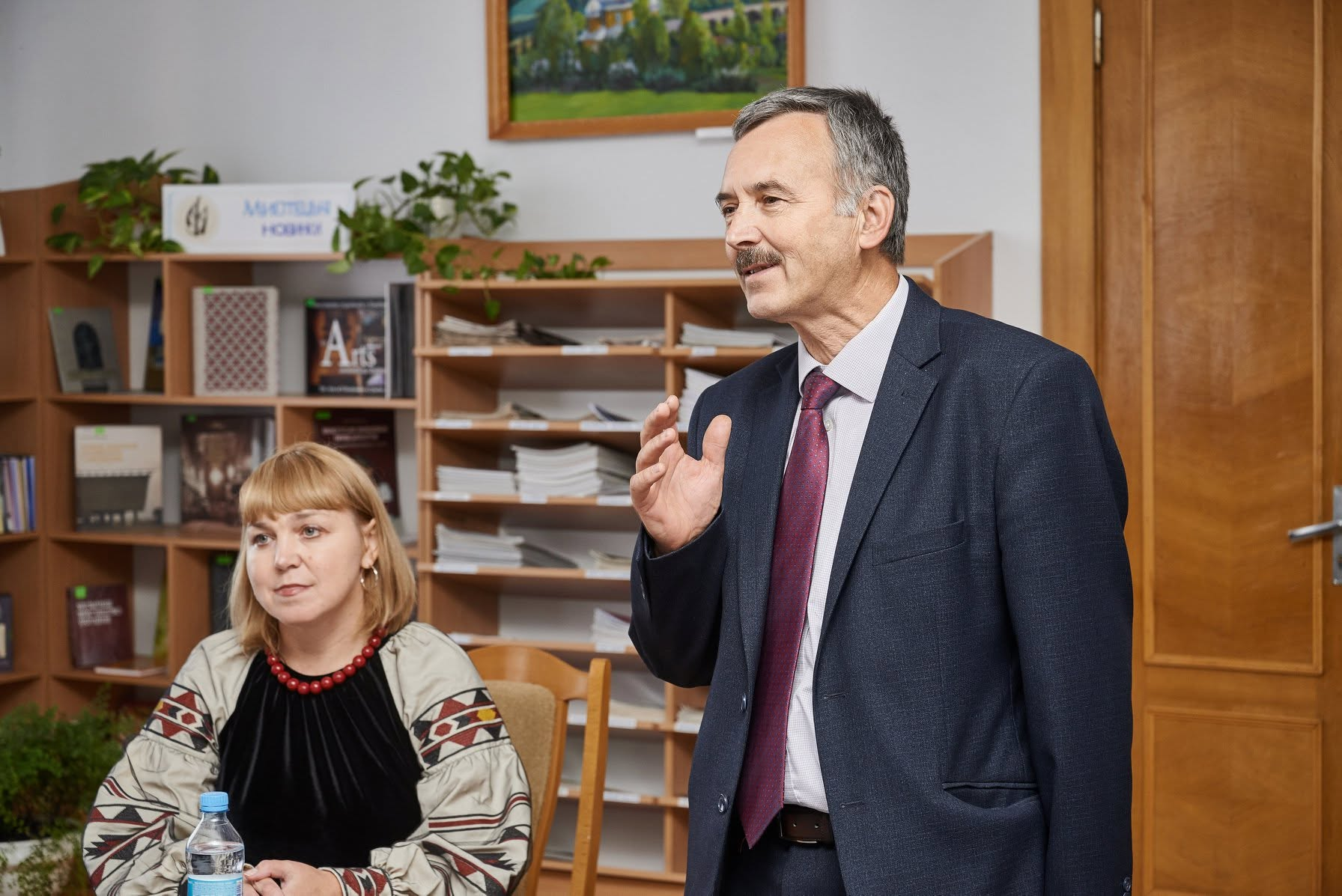
Volodymyr Shpilchak with Vira Khimeichuk in the Ivano-Frankivsk Regional Scientific Library named after I. Franko (2019)

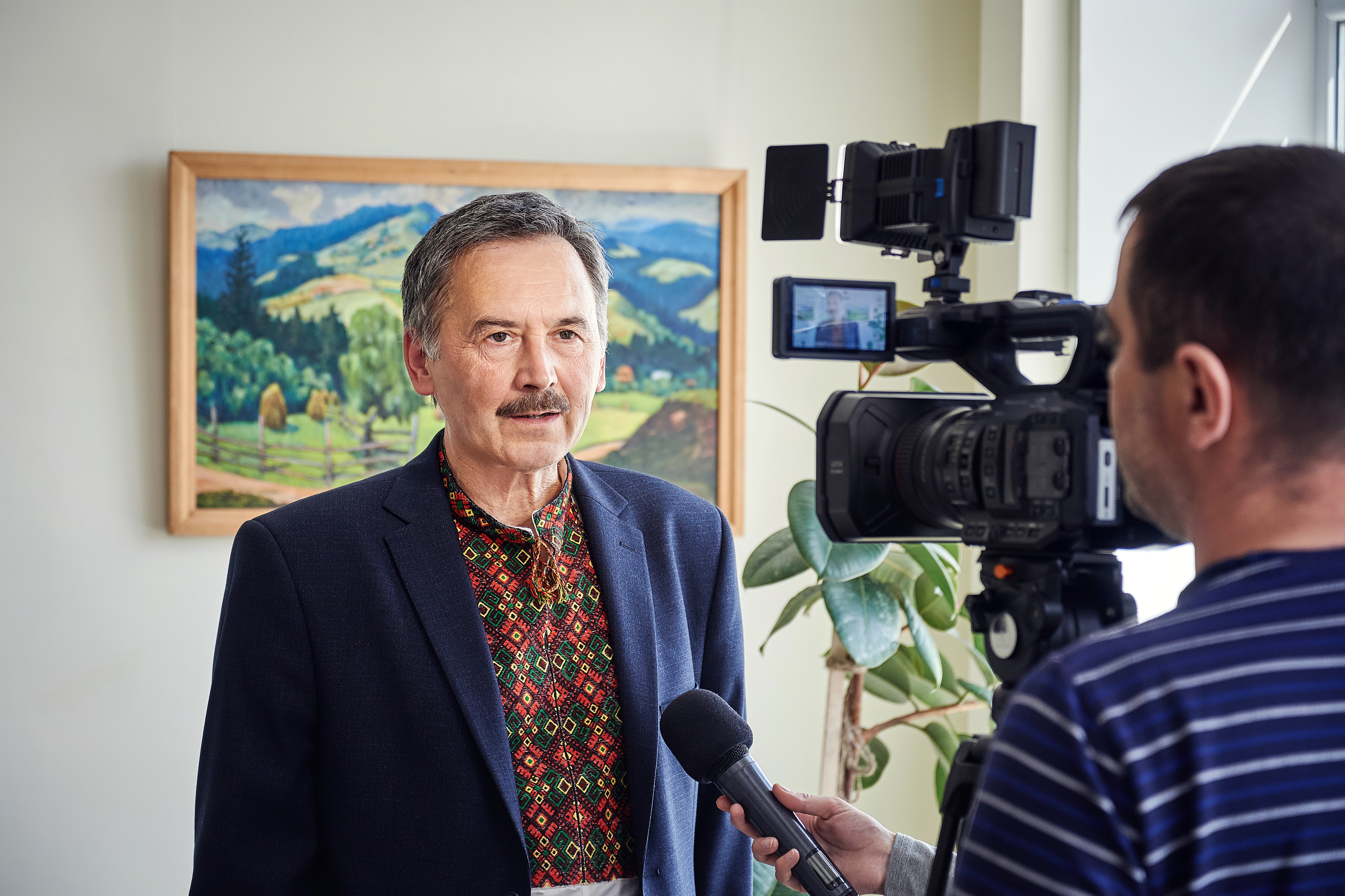
Volodymyr Shpilchak at a creative evening at the Yamnytsky Lyceum (2019)

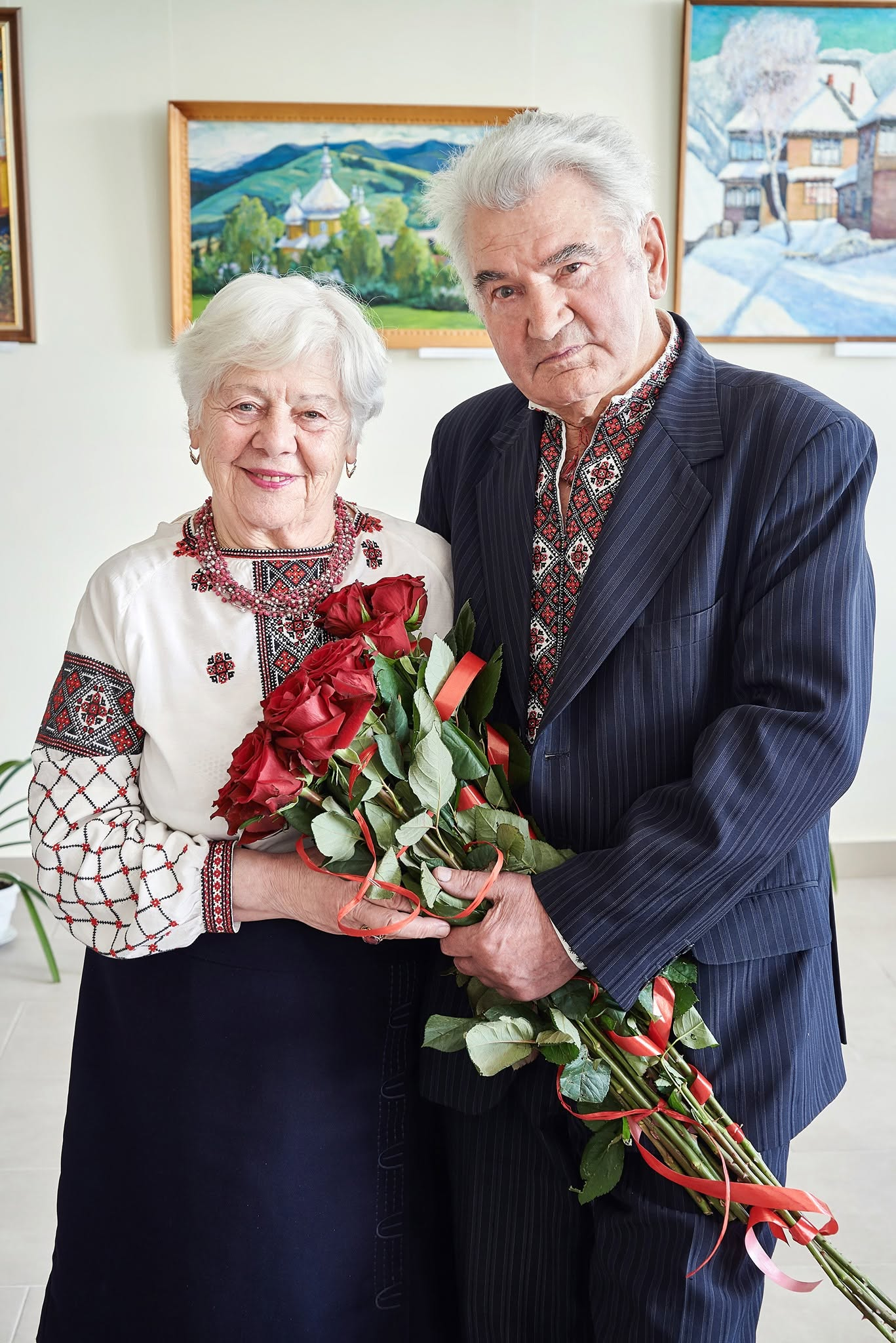
Anton Shpilchak (father) and Maria Zhupnyk at the exhibition "Carpathian Color" (2019)

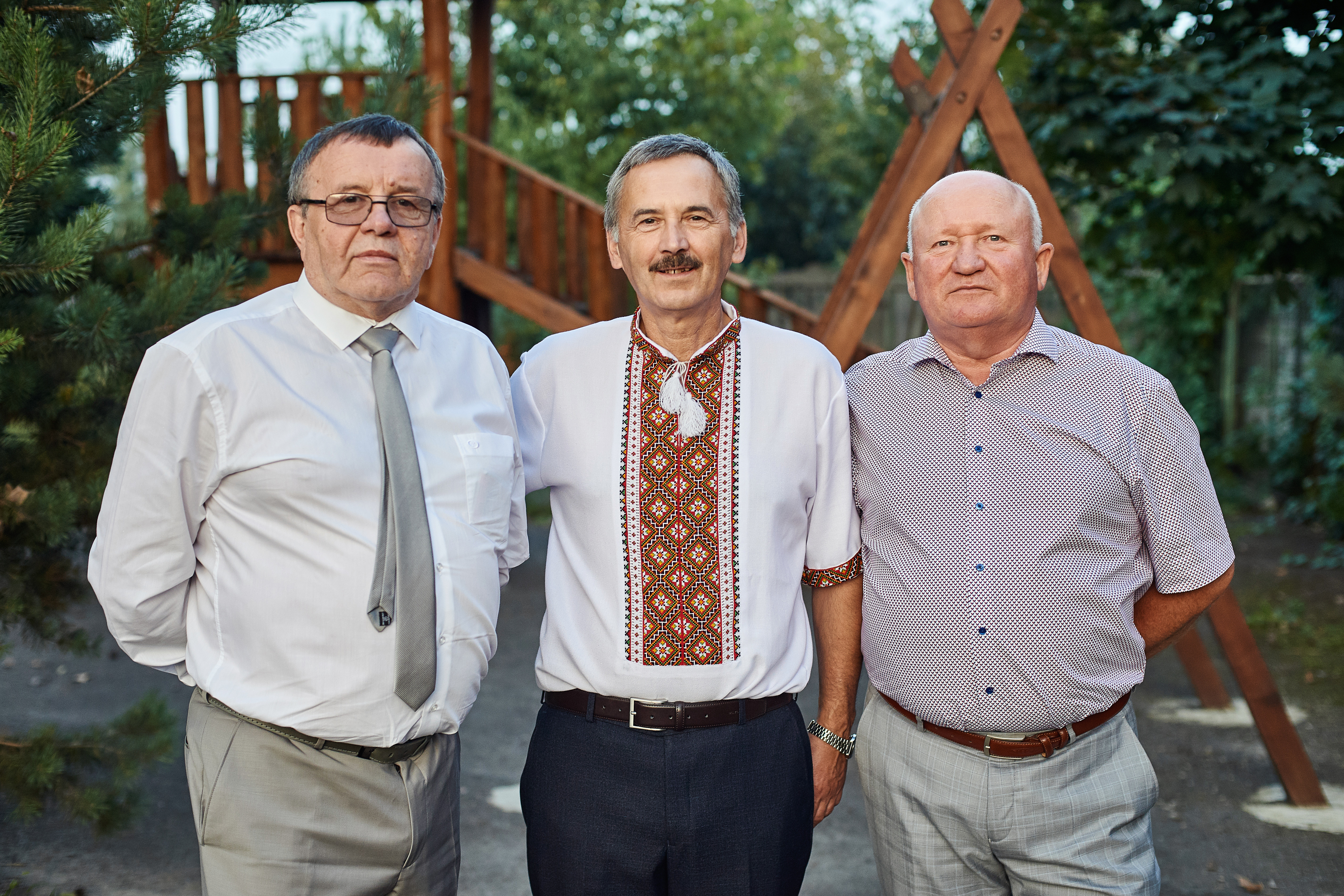
(from left to right) Mykola Doroshenko, Volodymyr Shpilchak, Ihor Garkot — friends and colleagues (2019)

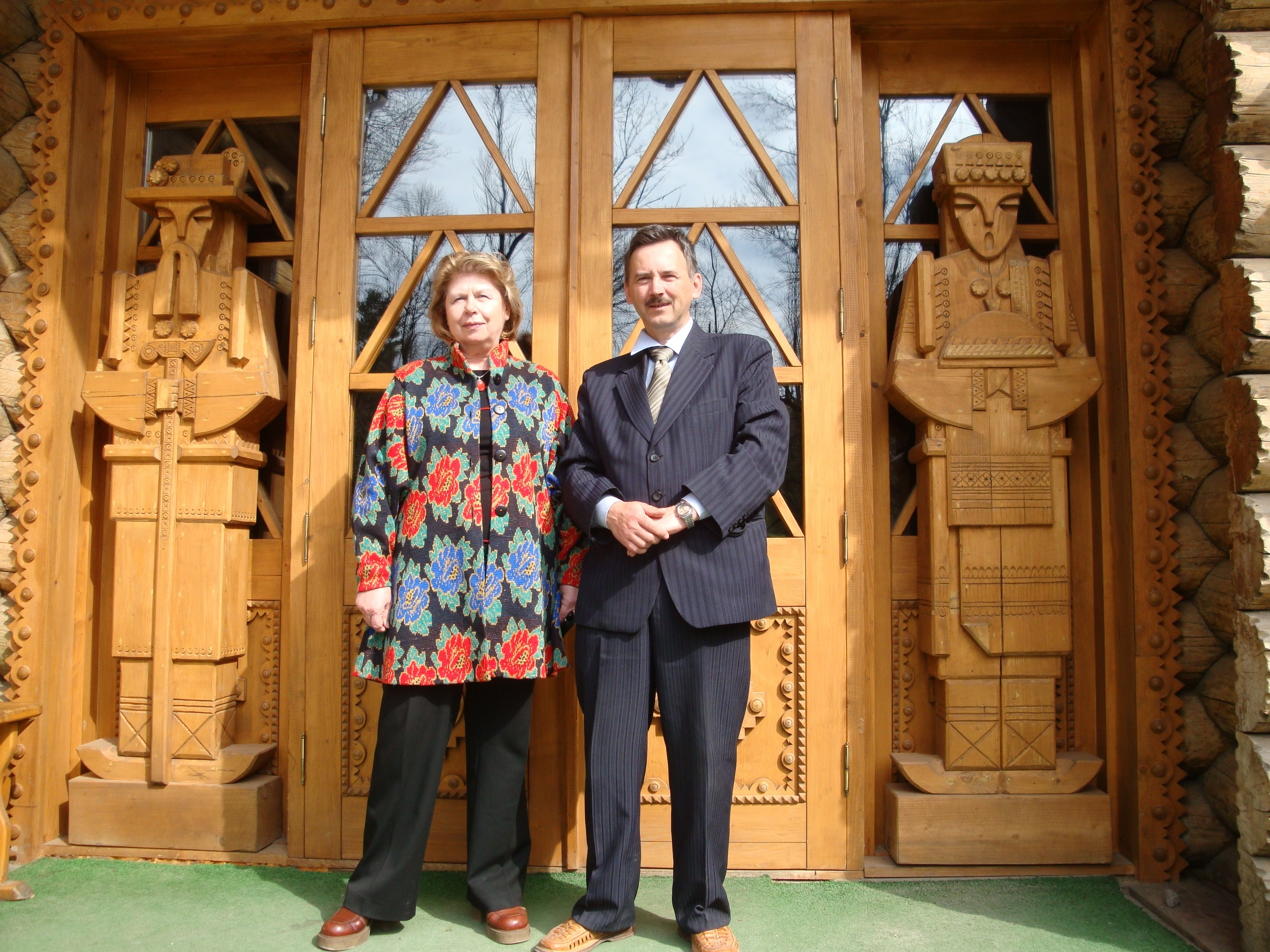
Successful completion of accreditation (Yaremche, restaurant-museum "Hutsulshchyna")

== Honorary titles ==
=== Membership in scientific societies ===
Since 1999 — member of the Union of Designers of Ukraine.

From 1999 to 2012, Volodymyr Shpilchak was the chairman of the board of the regional branch of the Union of Designers of Ukraine.

He is a member of the National Union of Architects of Ukraine (1996).

З 1992 року — member of the board of the city association of the All-Ukrainian Society "Prosvita" named after Taras Shevchenko.

From 1992 to 2005 – member of the Scientific and Methodological Council for Fine Arts of the Ministry of Education and Science of Ukraine.

Member of the Academic Council of the Educational and Scientific Institute of Arts of the Vasyl Stefanyk Precarpathian National University.

=== Academic degrees, academic titles ===
Volodymyr Shpilchak received the degree of Candidate of Pedagogical Sciences (1992). A Candidate of Sciences is a PhD-equivalent academic research degree.

He obtained the academic title of associate professor (1994).

=== Awards ===
Volodymyr Shpilchak was awarded the Honorary Certificates of the Union of Designers of Ukraine (2007, 2009), the Honorary Badge "For the Development of Education" (2007), the Honorary Badge "For the Development of Design" (2012), the medal of the Vasyl Stefanyk Precarpathian National University "For Merit to the University" (2019), the medal of the All-Ukrainian Society "Prosvita" named after Taras Shevchenko "Builder of Ukraine" (2025) and a number of other honorary certificate.

== Works ==
Volodymyr Shpilchak researches the theory and history of art education and upbringing, as well as the history of architecture. He has authored over 120 publications, including textbooks and teaching aids on fine arts, engineering graphics, descriptive geometry, and landscape design.

Key Academic and Teaching Publications.

Visual Arts & Pedagogy:“Pedagogical Guidance of Visual Arts for Schoolchildren” (1994; co-authored with E. Antonovich), the school textbook for grades 5–6 “Fine Arts” (1998; co-authored with S. Svyd, E. Antonovich).

Engineering & Architecture: “Russian-Ukrainian Reference Dictionary of Engineering Graphics, Design and Architecture” (2001; co-authored with Y. Vasylyshyn, E. Antonovich),"Engineering Drawing Textbook" (co-authored with Y. Antonovich, Y. Vasylyshyn), "Descriptive Geometry": Tutorial (2004; co-authored with E. Antonovich, Y. Vasylyshyn).

Landscape Design & Graphics: Landscape Design Training Manual (2016), Landscape Graphics (2023; co-authored with U.Melnyk).

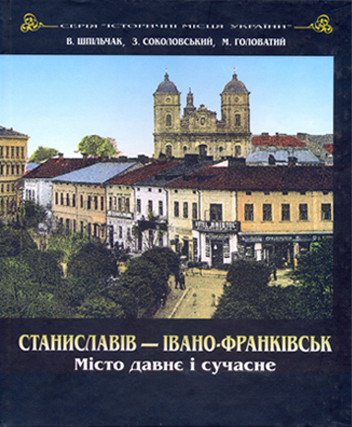
Volodymyr Shpilchak, Zenovii Sokolovskyi, Mykhailo Holovatyi."Stanislaviv — Ivano-Frankivsk. The Ancient and Modern City". The book is part of the series "Historical Places of Ukraine"

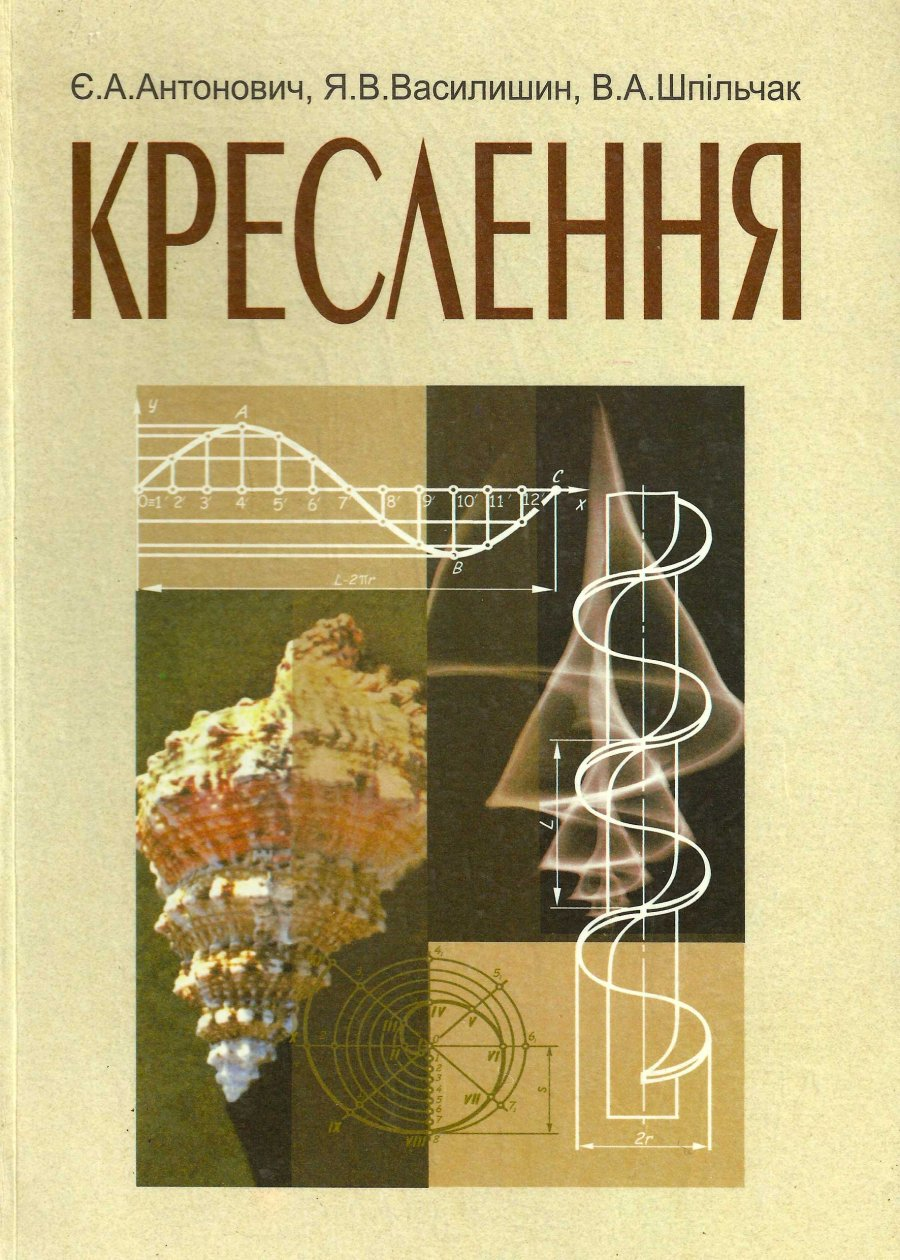
Engineering Drawing Textbook (2006)

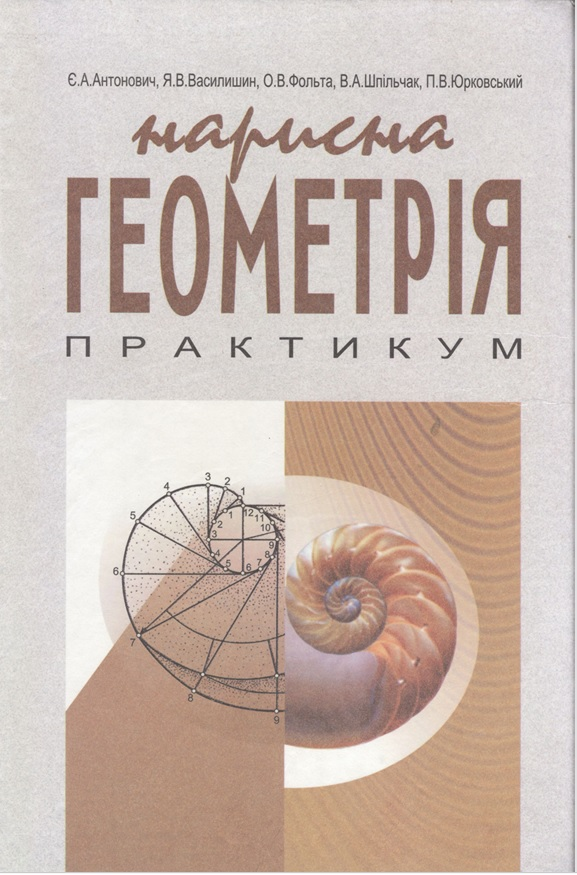
"Descriptive Geometry": Tutorial (2004)

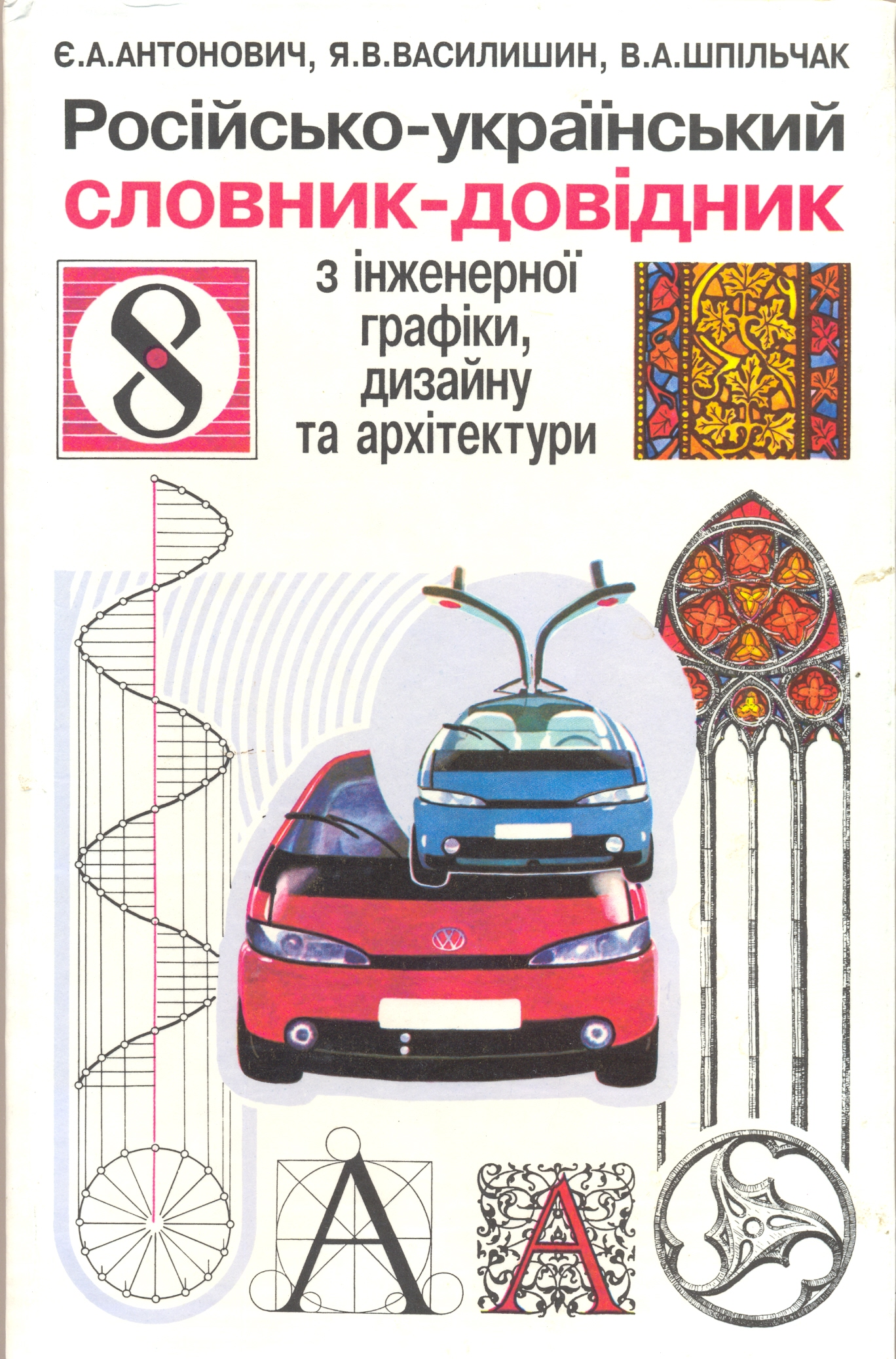
"Russian-Ukrainian Reference Dictionary of Engineering Graphics, Design and Architecture" (1999)

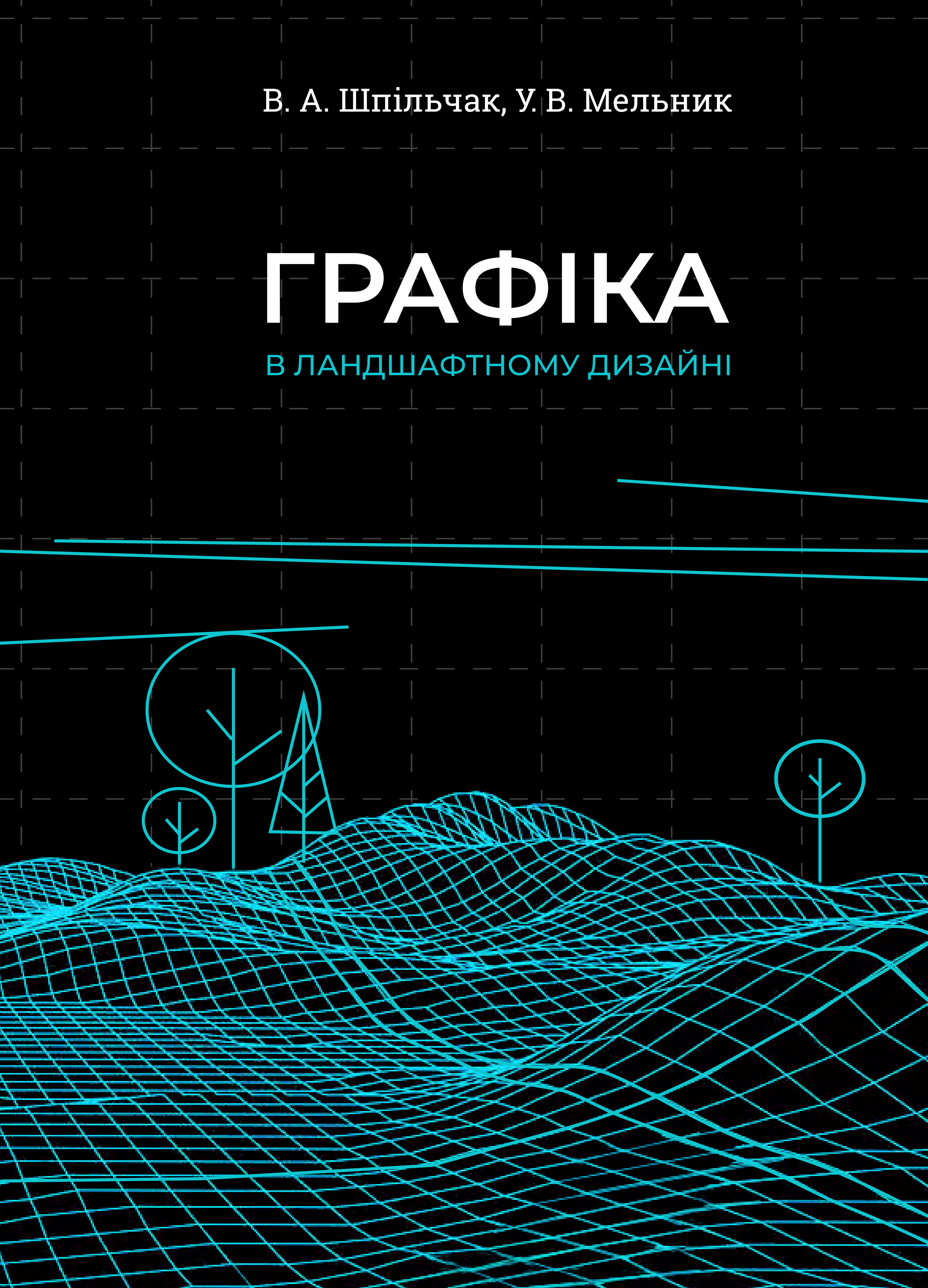
Volodymyr Shpilchak, Ulyana Melnyk. Landscape Graphics (2023)

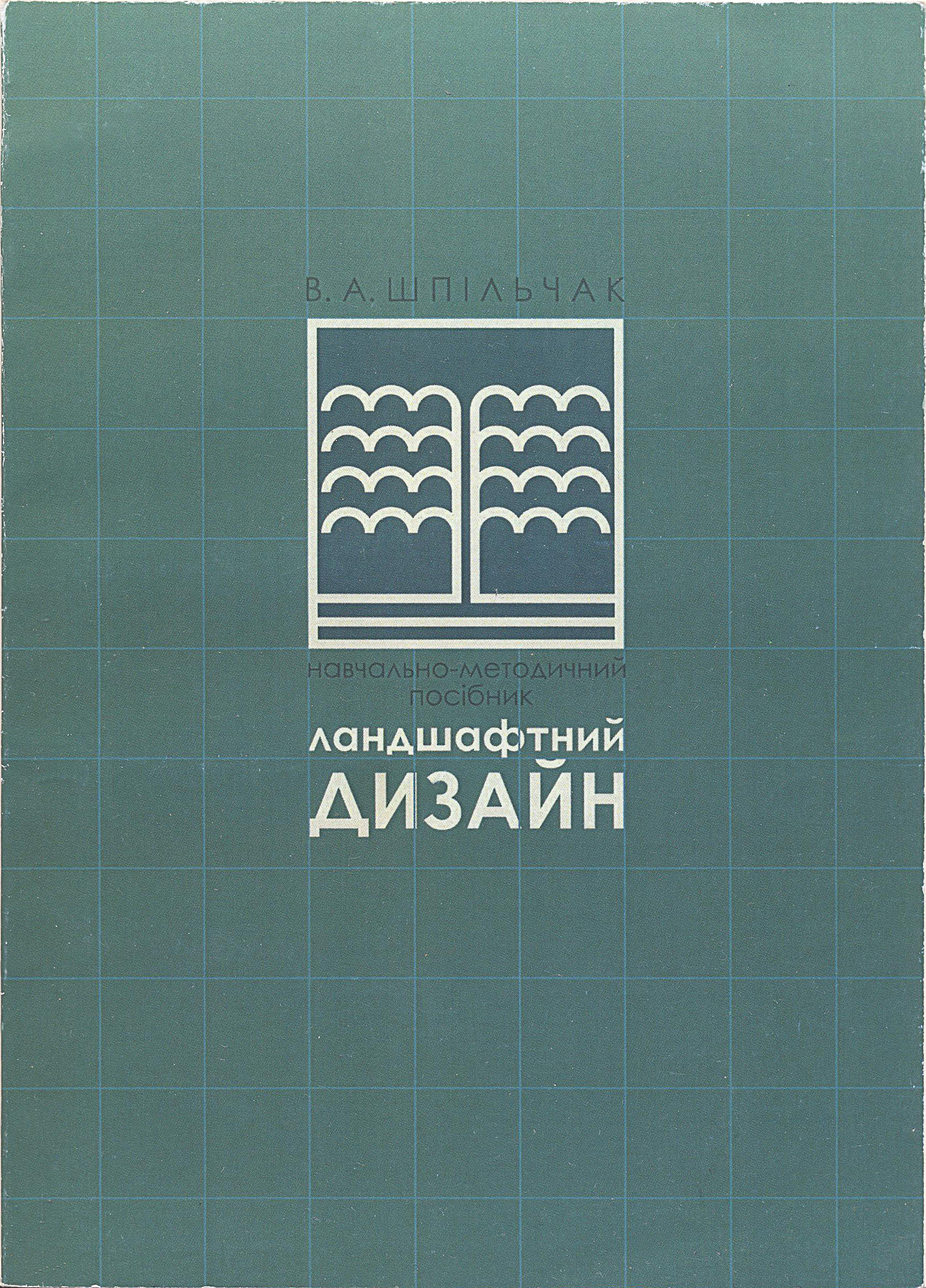
Volodymyr Shpilchak. Landscape Design Training Manual (2016)

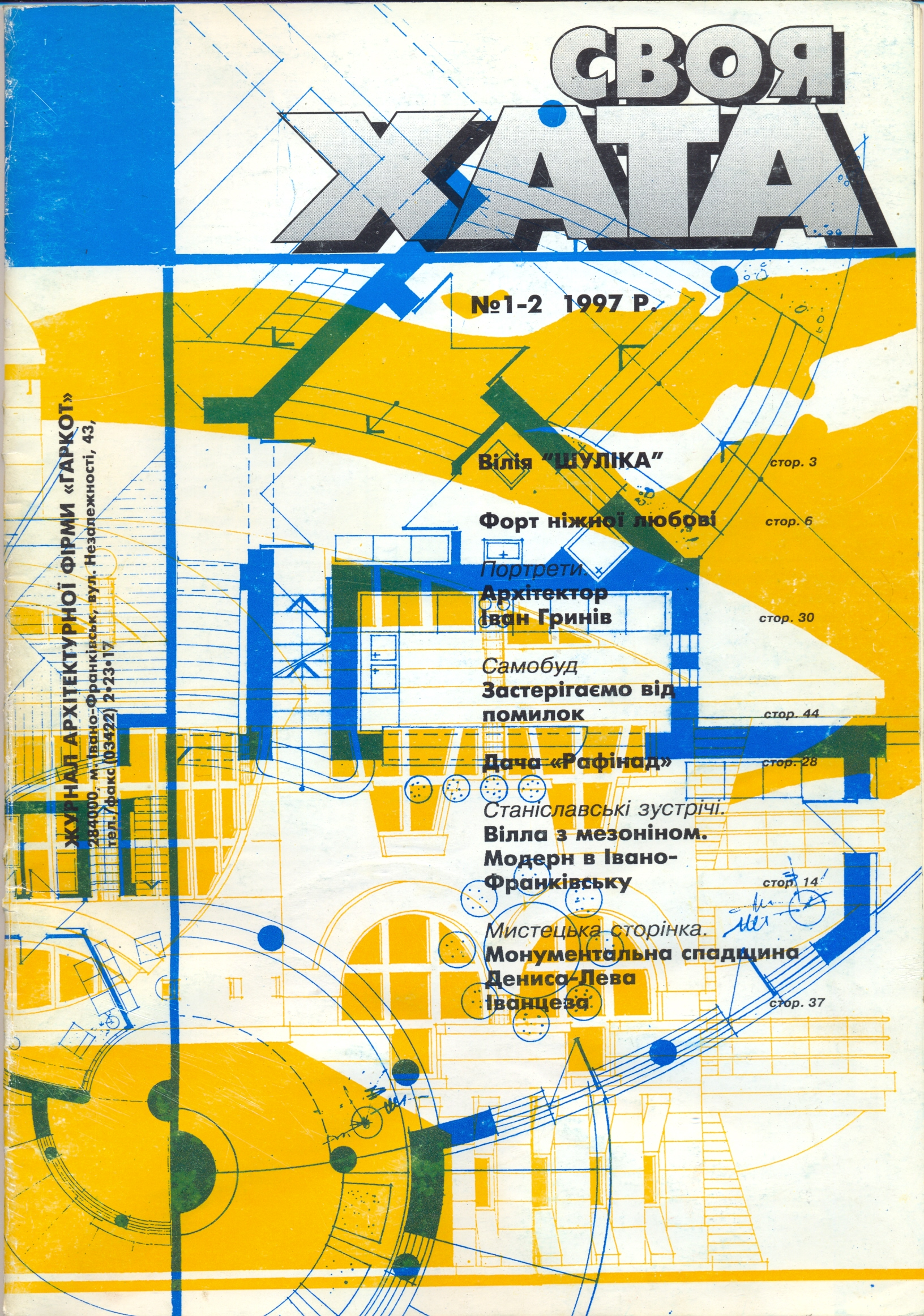
magazine «Svoia Khata» ("Own House")

== Collecting ==
Volodymyr Shpilchak is a passionate collector of coins, stamps and works of art. Initially, his interests included paintings and graphic works by local avant-garde artists, before expanding to original small sculptures.His collection is kept in the family archive and private collections, while some pieces are displayed in the art gallery located in his private home.

== Gallery ==
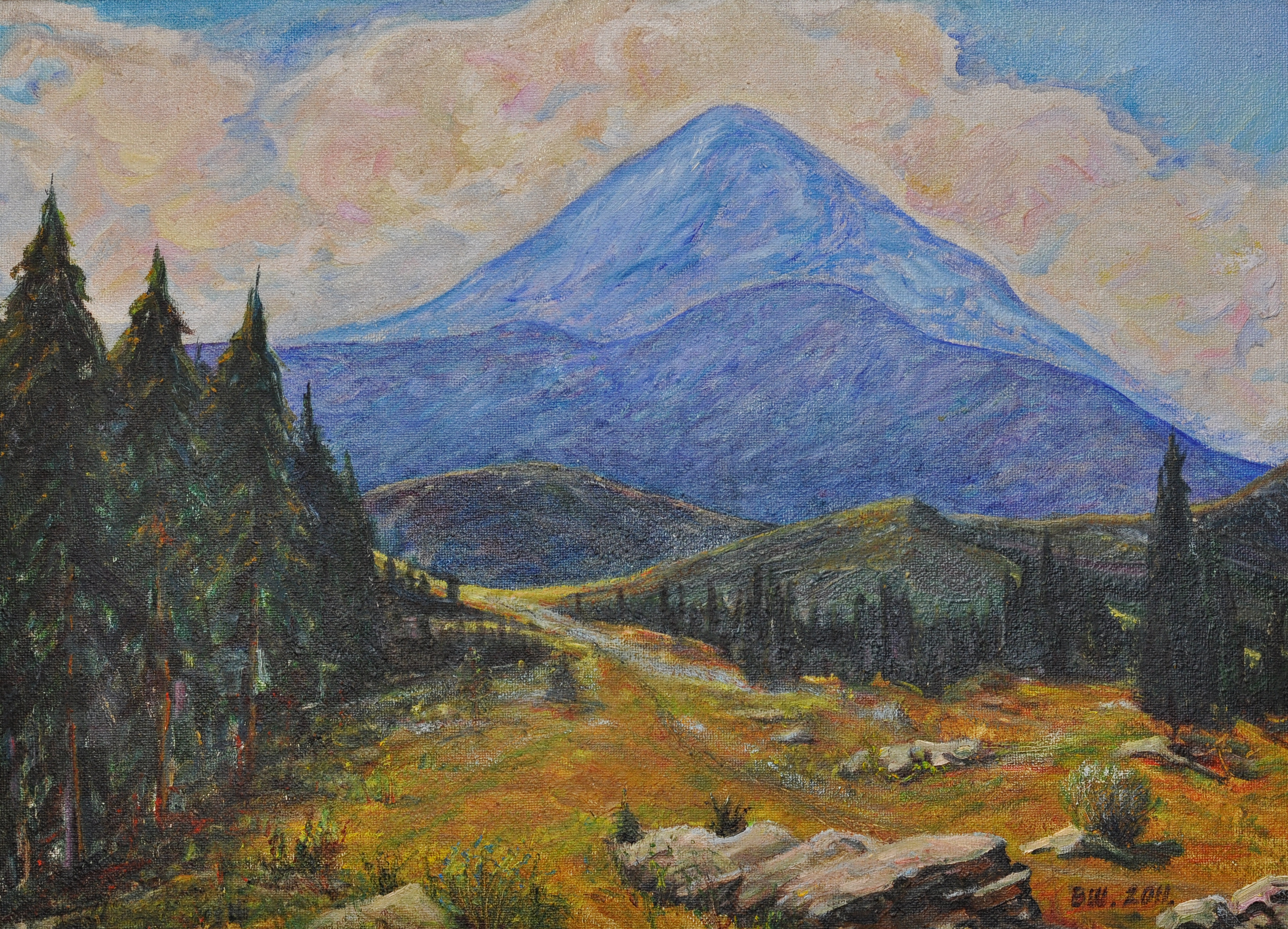
Hoverla (2011)

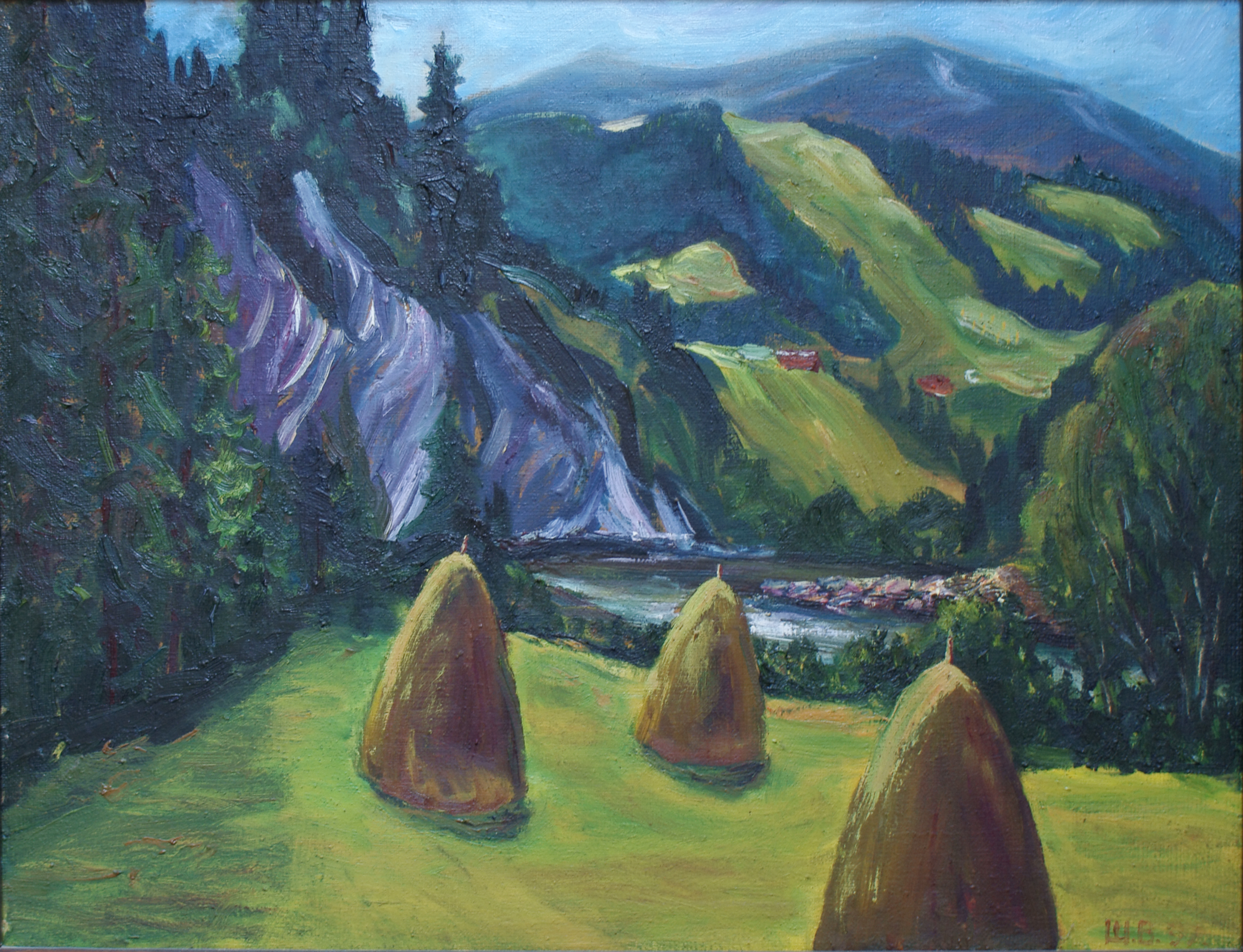
Vorokhta landscape (1997)

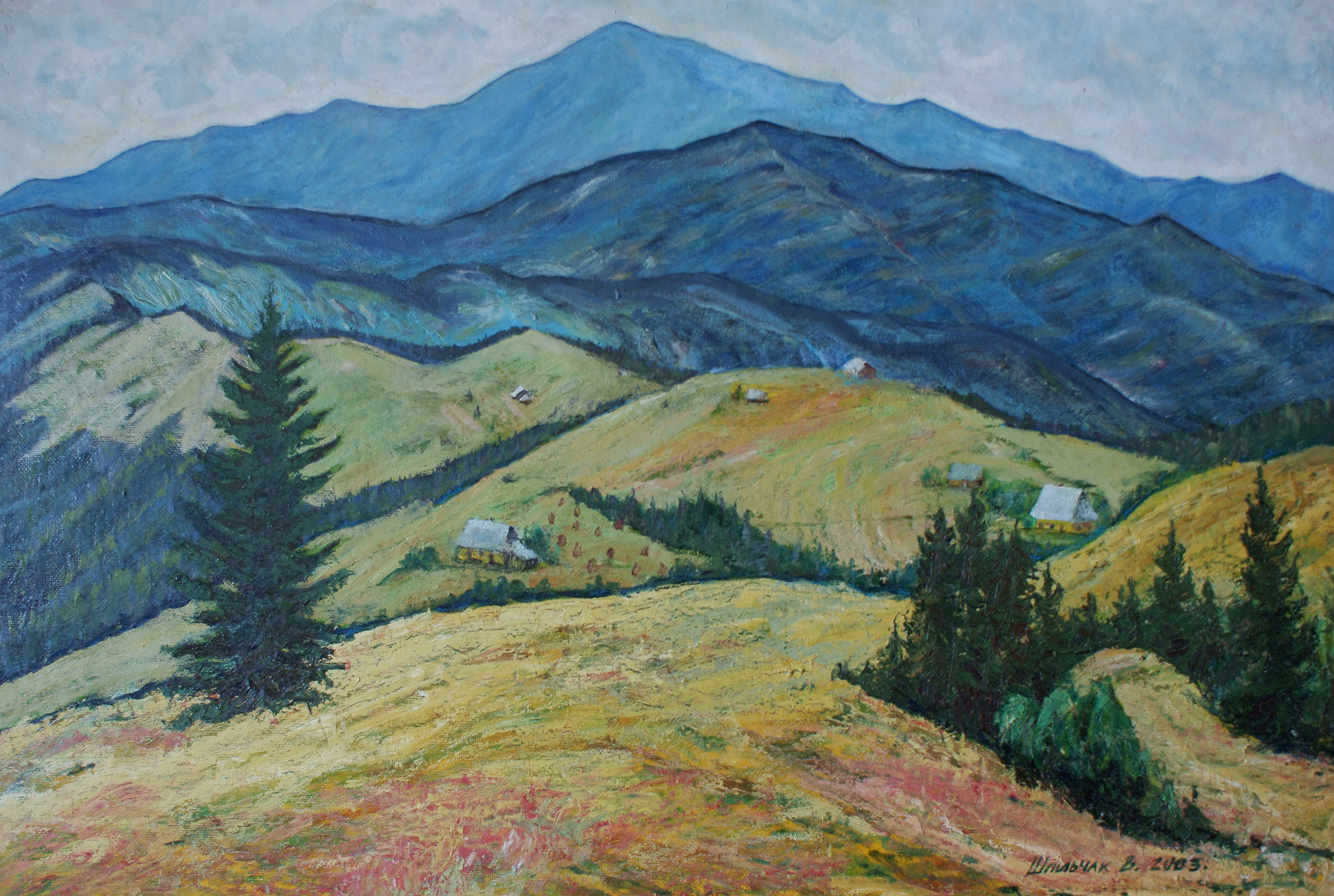
Carpathian landscape (2003)

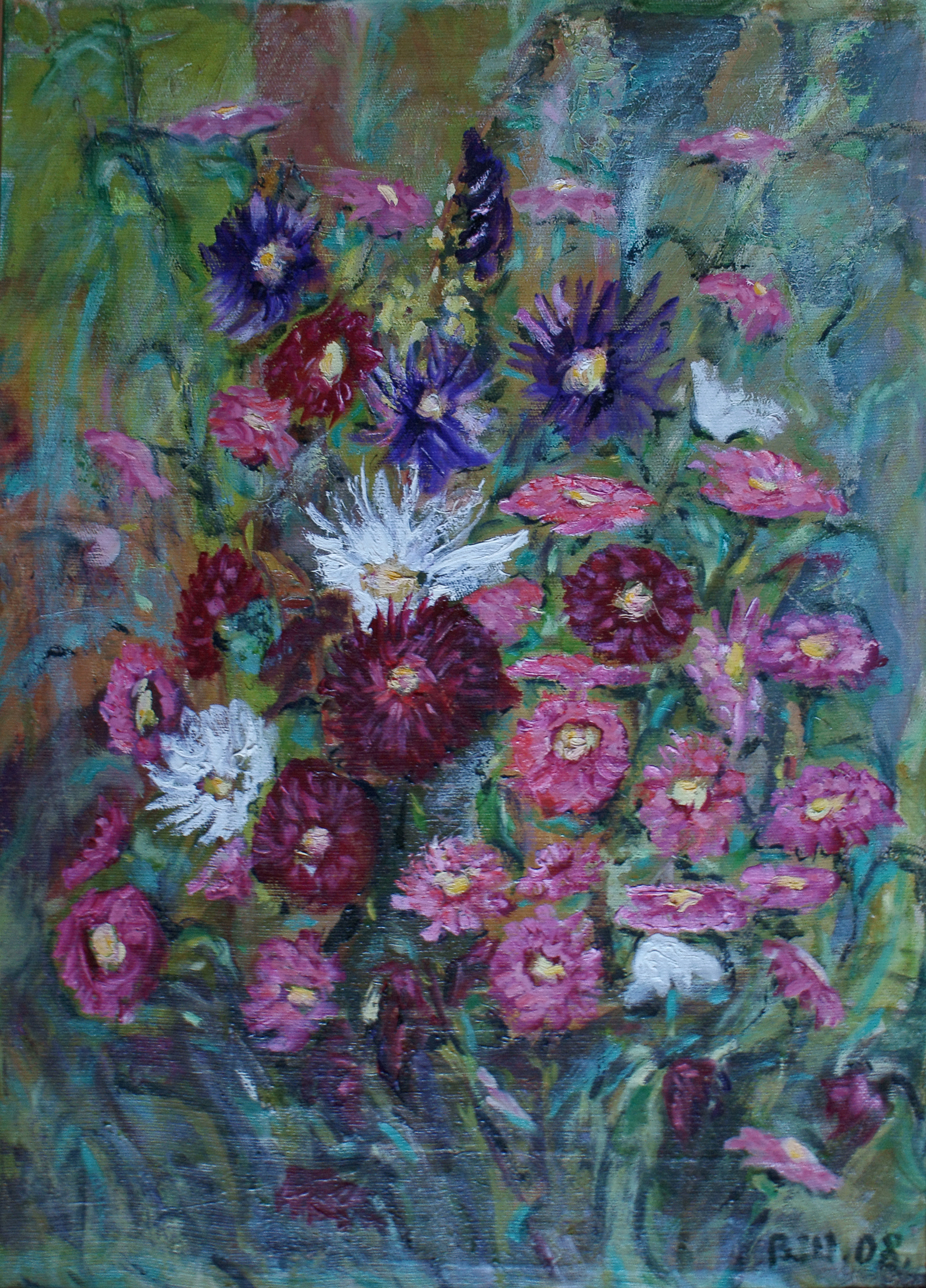
Bouquet of Flowers (2008)

== See also ==
- Прокопів Петро Микитович
- Фіґоль Михайло Павлович
- Селівачов Михайло Романович

== Literature ==
1.Antonovich E.A., Vasylyshyn Y.V., Shpilchak V.A. A 72. Engineering Drawing Textbook. Edited by prof. E.A. Antonovich. Lviv: Svit, 2006. 512 p., ill. ISBN 978-966-603-479-6 506 p.

2.Antonovich E.A., Vasylyshyn Y.V., Folta O.V., Shpilchak V.A., Yurkovsky P.V. Descriptive Geometry: Tutorial : Textbook / Edited by prof. E.A.Antonovich. Lviv: Svit, 2004. 528 p.

3. Antonovich E., Vasylyshyn Y., Shpilchak V. Russian-Ukrainian Reference Dictionary of Engineering Graphics, Design and Architecture. Textbook. Lviv: Svit, 1999. 240 p.

4. Antonovych E., Svyd S., Shpilchak V. Fine Arts: Textbook for Grades 5–6. Kyiv: Osvita, 1998. 144.

5.Department of Design and Art Theory: Bibliographic Index / Compiled by H. Makogin et al. Ivano-Frankivsk: Foliant, 2015. P.69-72.

6. Educational and Scientific Institute of Arts of the Vasyl Stefanyk Precarpathian National University (2001–2021): reference and presentation edition / edited by A.Hrytsan. Ivano-Frankivsk: Foliant, 2021. 368 p. with illustrations.

7. Shpilchak V., Sokolovskyi Z., Holovatyi M. Stanislaviv — Ivano-Frankivsk. The Ancient and Modern City: Series "Historical Sites of Ukraine". Lviv: Svit, 2011. 296 p.

8. Shpilchak V. Art Nouveau in Ivano-Frankivsk. Villa with a Mezzanine. Svoia Khata. Ivano-Frankivsk, 1997. No. 1-2. P. 14–17.

9. Shpilchak V. Architect Volodymyr Lukomskyi. Portraits. Svoia Khata. Ivano-Frankivsk, 1995. No. 1-2. P. 36–40.

10. Shpilchak V., Polek V. Monument to Ivan Franko. Svoia Khata. Ivano-Frankivsk. 1995. No. 1-2. P. 16–17.
