= Radcha =

Radcha (Ukrainian: Радча) may refer to:

- Radcha, Zhytomyr Oblast
- Radcha, Ivano-Frankivsk Oblast
- Radcha (river)
