= Khryplyn =

Rural locality in Ivano-Frankivsk Oblast, Ukraine

Khryplyn Хриплин Chryplin
- Village
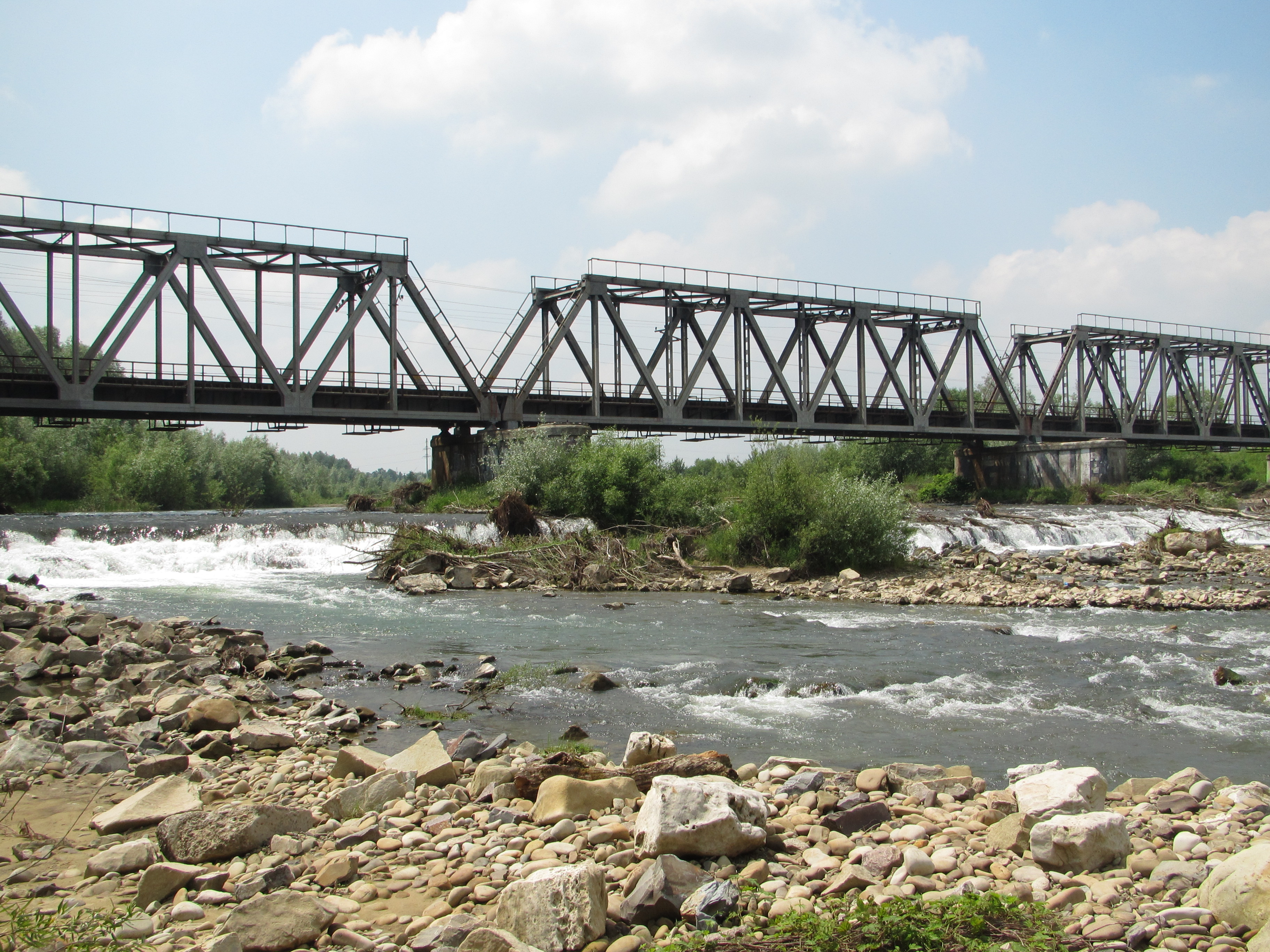
- Railway bridge in Khryplyn

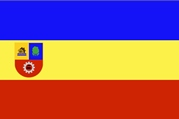
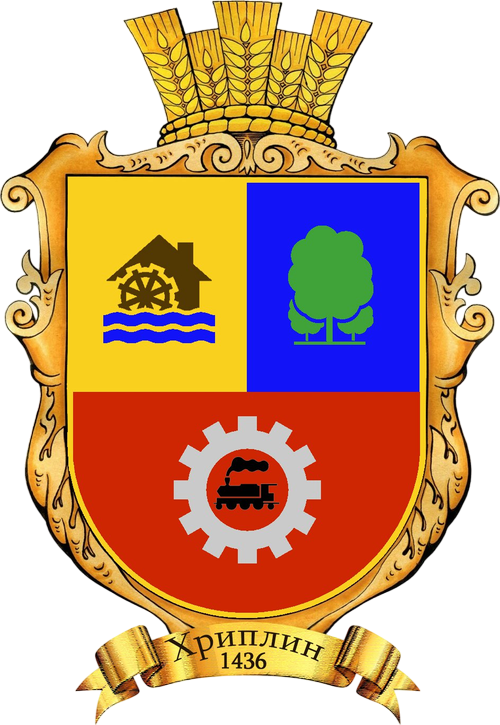
- Flag Coat of arms

- Location of Khryplyn, Ivano-Frankivsk Oblast Khryplyn (Ukraine)
- Coordinates: 48°52′52″N 24°44′08″E
- Country: Ukraine
- Oblast: Ivano-Frankivsk Oblast
- Raion: Ivano-Frankivsk Raion
- First mentioned: 1436

Area
  - Total: 9.58 km^{2} (3.70 sq mi)

Population (2021)
  - Total: 2,087
  - Density: 196.89/km^{2} (509.9/sq mi)
- Area code: 380 03422

Khryplyn (Ukrainian: Хриплин, Polish: Chryplin) is a village in Ivano-Frankivsk Raion, Ivano-Frankivsk Oblast, Ukraine. It was first mentioned in 1436. Khryplyn belongs to Ivano-Frankivsk urban hromada, one of the hromadas of Ukraine.

The village is located right next to the city of Ivano-Frankivsk across the Bystrytsia-Nadvirnyanska River that makes a natural border of the village to the west and northwest. The village also sits next to another suburb, Mykytyntsi, bordering which by a railroad and the State companies of Avtolyvmash and Presmash (former Karpatpresmash) to the northeast. The railroad also makes the eastern border of the village as well. To the south of Khryplyn is located the village of Cherniiv.

The whole village consists of the original settlement that stretches along its main street, Avtolyvmash Street, and a cottage settlement that is located to the west, closer to the banks of Bystrytsia river. The two settlements are divided by the Bystrytsia's tributary Mlynivka.

The former mayor of Ivano-Frankivsk Zinoviy Shkutiak was looking for greenfield investments for the Kryplyn Industrial Zone.

Until 18 July 2020, Khryplyn belonged to Ivano-Frankivsk Municipality. The municipality was abolished in July 2020 as part of the administrative reform of Ukraine, which reduced the number of raions of Ivano-Frankivsk Oblast to six. The area of Ivano-Frankivsk Municipality was merged into Ivano-Frankivsk Raion.

== Khryplyn Industrial-Investment Zone ==
Khryplyn Industrial-Investment Zone (Ukrainian: Хриплинська інвестиційно-промислова зона):

- Ukrainian Appliances
  - "Electrolux" laundry washing machine
- Tyco Electronics Ukraine
- Pressmash, former state company
- Hyrych, a plastic recycling company
- Construction materials, a producing complex for brick production

== Transportation ==
- Khryplyn railways station is an important railway station of Ivano-Frankivsk. Traveling from Ivano-Frankivsk, trains diverge either towards Kolomyia and further towards Chernivtsi or towards Nadvirna and further to the border with Romania.

== Notable residents ==
- Yaroslav Hretchuk (1955 – 2010), a Distinguished Journalist of Ukraine, who lived and died in the village.
