= Krykhivtsi =

Rural locality in Ivano-Frankivsk Oblast, Ukraine

Krykhivtsi Крихівці
- Village
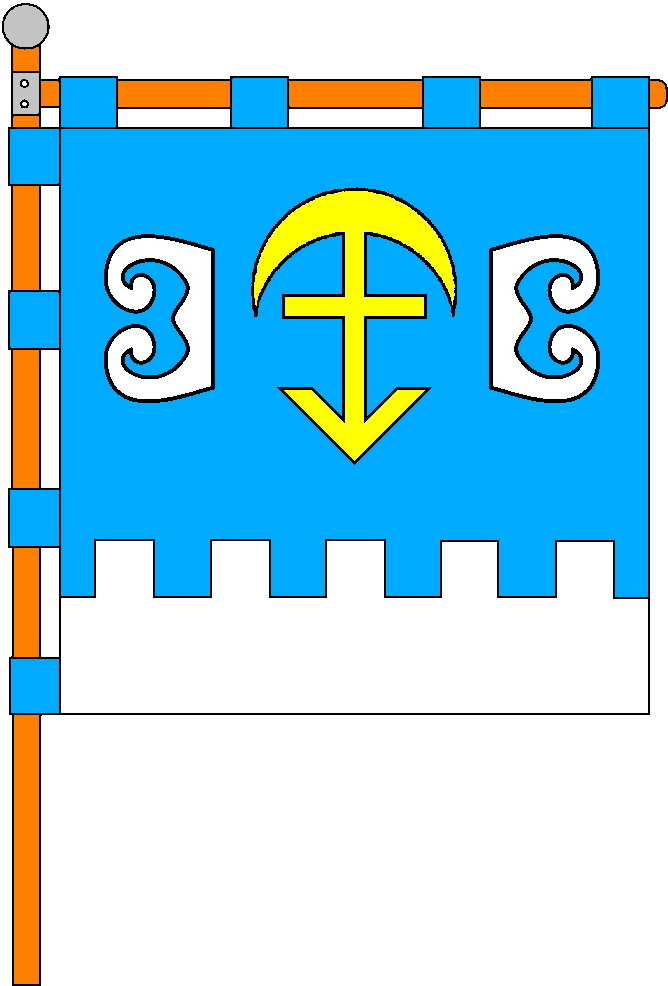
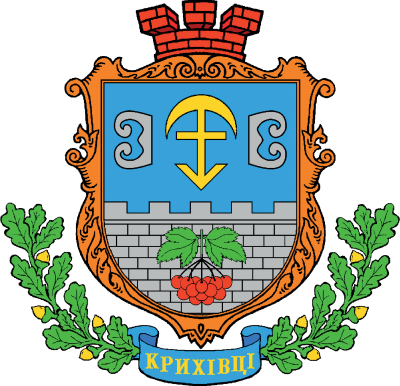
- Flag Coat of arms

- Location of Krykhivtsi, Ivano-Frankivsk Oblast
- Coordinates: 48.900838°N 24.666168°E
- Country: Ukraine
- Oblast: Ivano-Frankivsk Oblast
- Raion: Ivano-Frankivsk Raion

Area
  - Total: 6.701 km^{2} (2.587 sq mi)

Population (2022)
  - Total: 11,865
- Postal code: 76493
- Area code: +380 0342

Krykhivtsi (Ukrainian: Крихівці, Polish: Krechowce) is a big village at the southwestern edge of Ivano-Frankivsk, in Western Ukraine. It belongs to Ivano-Frankivsk urban hromada, one of the hromadas of Ukraine.

The village is located just west of Ivano-Frankivsk International Airport. South of it is located another village of Drohomyrchany, while to the west across the Bystrytsia Solotvynska Krykhivtsi borders a village of Pidlissya (Ivano-Frankivsk Raion).

Until 18 July 2020, Krykhivtsi belonged to Ivano-Frankivsk Municipality. The municipality was abolished in July 2020 as part of the administrative reform of Ukraine, which reduced the number of raions of Ivano-Frankivsk Oblast to six. The area of Ivano-Frankivsk Municipality was merged into Ivano-Frankivsk Raion.
