= Mykhailyna Roshkevych =

Ukrainian folklorist (1859–1957)

Mykhailyna Mykhailivna Roshkevych (1859–1957) was a Ukrainian folklorist and memoirist. One of the first writers in Galicia, whom Ukrainian writers Ivan Franko and Mykhailo Pavlyk called a "great talent." Mother of the Ukrainian artist Ivan Ivanets.

== Early life and education ==
Maria Roshkevych was born in Uhornyky village, Stanislaviv district, Austrian empire (now Ivano-Frankivsk district, Ukraine). She was the daughter of the Ukrainian Greek Catholic Church priest, Mykhailo Roshkevich and Maria Rudenska. She was given a double name - Mykhailyna-Maria - after her parents. From 1864, Roshkevych lived in the village of Lolyn (now Dolyna district of Ivano-Frankivsk region), where her father Mykhailo Roshkevich was appointed to the parish.

== Works ==
Roshkevich is the author of memoirs about Ukrainian writer Ivan Franko's stay in Lolyna. Folk songs collected by her, Ivan Franko used in the study Women's plight in Russian folk songs (1883). And the song about the gendarme, recorded by Mykhailyna Roshkevich from a resident of Lolyna, Yavdokha Chigur, became the impetus for Franko's writing of the drama Stolen Happiness. Roshkevich also wrote literary sketches of life in Lolyna.

Roshkevych's work The Godmother with the Godmother was published in the magazine “Molot” as "a fascinating depiction of the life of women in Lolyna" with a favorable assessment from the publishing house, which wished that "the young author would not abandon such work in the future."

In 1877, Roshkevich published two stories from folk life: This is what God has judged the fate of and Mother-in-law in the women's almanac "The First Wreath" in Lviv. After the death of her father in 1886, Roshkevych's family left Lolyna village. They had to move out of the rectory because the new priest of the Church of St. Nicholas was moving there. Roshkevych was sheltered in Bolehov by writer Natalya Kobrynska for four years until she got married.

Roshkevych married a priest Yosyp Ivanets. She often visited Ivan Franko, particularly when he was ill. She lived to the age of 98 in Czechoslovakia, where she moved to her youngest son, Roman. Roshkevych died in 1957 in Czechoslovakia.
