= Tysmenytsia Raion =

Former subdivision of Ivano-Frankivsk Oblast, Ukraine

Tysmenytsia Raion Тисменицький район
- Raion
- Tysmenytskyi raion
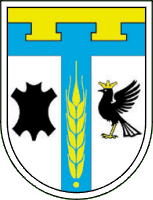
- Coat of arms

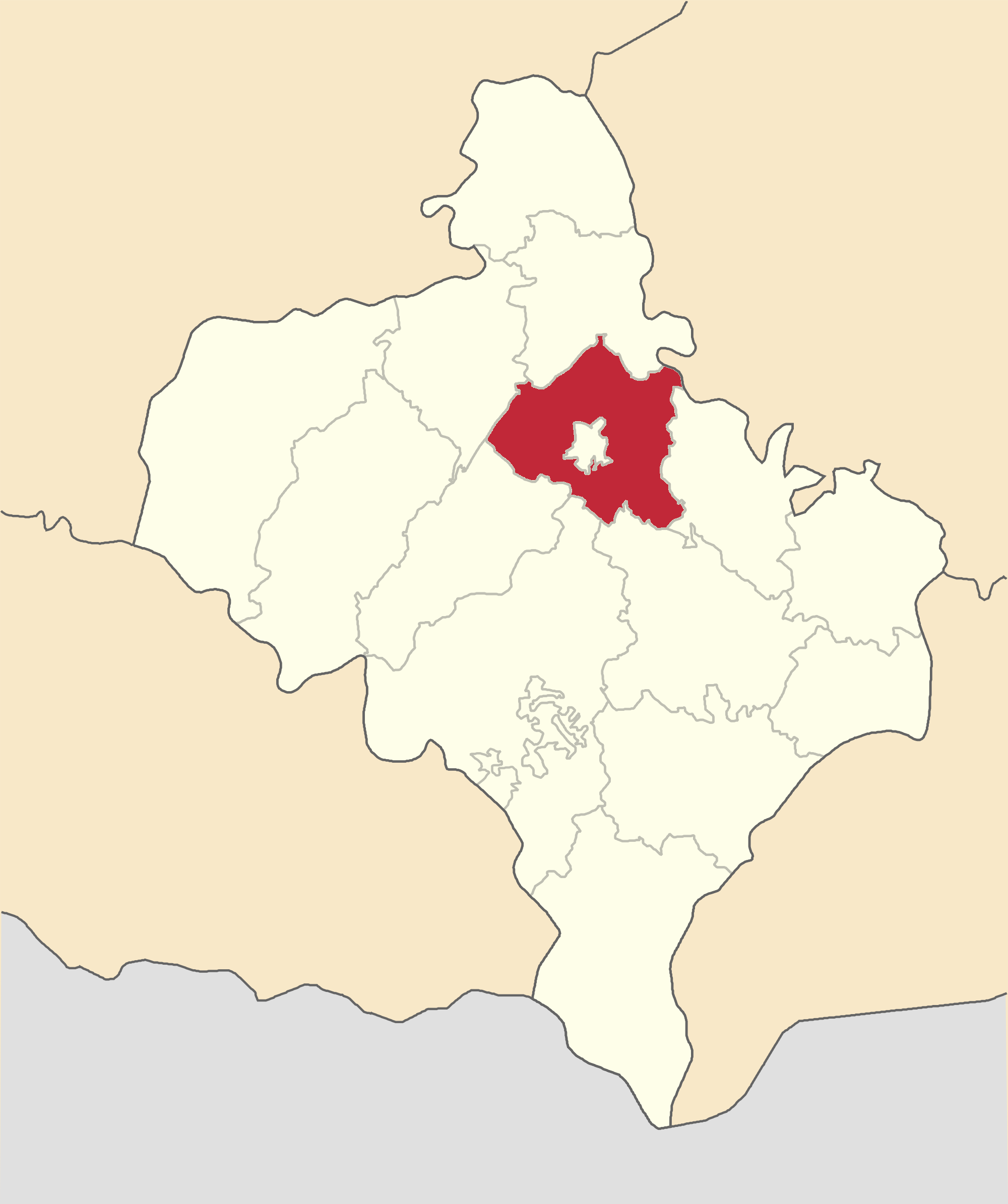
- Coordinates: 48°54′56″N 24°49′39″E
- Country: Ukraine
- Region: Ivano-Frankivsk Oblast
- Established: December 8, 1966
- Disestablished: 18 July 2020
- Admin. center: Tysmenytsia
- Subdivisions: List: — city councils; — settlement councils; — rural councils; Number of localities: — cities; — urban-type settlements; — villages; — rural settlements

Government
  - Governor: Volodymyr Semeniv

Area
  - Total: 736 km^{2} (284 sq mi)

Population (2020)
  - Total: 81,796
  - Density: 111/km^{2} (288/sq mi)
- Time zone: UTC+02:00 (EET)
  - Summer (DST): UTC+03:00 (EEST)
- Postal index: 774-XX
- Area code: 380
- Website: http://tsm.if.gov.ua/

Tysmenytsia Raion (Ukrainian: Тисменицький район, romanized: Tysmenyc'kyj rajon) was an administrative raion (district) of Ivano-Frankivsk Oblast (province) in western Ukraine. It was created on 8 December 1966, as Ivano-Frankivsk Raion. Since 28 March 1982 the name of raion was changed to Tysmenytsia when the administrative center of it became the city of Tysmenytsia. The raion was abolished on 18 July 2020 as part of the administrative reform of Ukraine, which reduced the number of raions of Ivano-Frankivsk Oblast Oblast to six. The area of Tysmenytsia Raion was merged into Ivano-Frankivsk Raion. The last estimate of the raion population was 81,796 (2020 est.).

== Subdivisions ==
At the time of disestablishment, the raion consisted of six hromadas:

- Lysets settlement hromada with the administration in the urban-type settlement of Lysets;
- Tysmenytsia urban hromada with the administration in Tysmenytsia;
- Uhryniv rural hromada with the administration in the selo of Uhryniv;
- Yamnytsia rural hromada with the administration in the selo of Yamnytsia;
- Yezupil settlement hromada with the administration in the urban-type settlement of Yezupil;
- Zahvizdia rural hromada with the administration in the selo of Zahvizdia.

== Geography ==
The raion was located near the eastern border of Ivano-Frankivsk Oblast. To the north it bordered Halych Raion, to the west – Kalush and Bohorodchany raions, to the south – Kolomyia and Nadvirna raions, and to the east – Tlumach Raion with small portion of an oblast demarcation line with Ternopil Oblast. The raion completely surrounded Ivano-Frankivsk Municipality with numerous villages bordering with it and are part of the city's infrastructure: Uhryniv, Yamnytsia, Drahomyrchany, Zahvizdya, and others. The administrative center of the raion, Tysmenytsia, is only 11 kilometres (6.8 mi) away from Ivano-Frankivsk.

The oldest settlements in the raion were Cherniiv (1404), Stari Kryvotuly (1436), Uhryniv (1440), and others.

== Government ==
- Executive: Head of Raion State Administration – Volodymyr Semeniv
- Legislative: Raion Council (85 seats): Chairman – Mykola Nahornyi (Rukh)
  - Tysmenytsia City municipality
  - Yezupil Town municipality
  - Lysets Town municipality
  - 41 rural municipalities (communes) encompassing 48 villages

== Education ==
There were 43 general education schools in the raion with the best ones located in Tysmenytsia, Yezupil, Lysets, Markivtsi, Radcha, Stari Kryvotuly, Chorny Lis, and Uhryniv.

== Administrative division ==
Tysmenytsia Raion was divided into several municipalities (councils) some which are urban, others are rural. There were two types of urban municipalities: city and settlement (township). Rural municipalities (communes) may consist of a single village or combined into several villages, however most of the rural municipalities consisted of a single village. Also, the city of Tysmenytsia carried a special status of independent administration within the raion.

Urban (city, township)

- Yezupil
- Lysets
- Tysmenytsia

Rural (communes)

- Berezivka
- Bratkivtsi
- Cherniiv
- Chornoliztsi
- Chukalivka
- Dobrovlyany
- Dovhe
- Drahomyrchany
- Hannusivka
- Khomiakivka
- Klubivtsi
- Kluziv
- Kozyna
- Kolodiivka
- Lypivka (Nova Lypivka, Studynets)
- Maidan (Nova Huta)
- Markivtsi (Odayi)
- Myluvannia
- Novi Kryvotuly (Ternovytsia)
- Pavlivka
- Pidluzhia
- Pidlissia
- Pidpechery
- Poberezhia
- Posich
- Pshenychnyky (Pohonya)
- Radcha
- Rybne
- Roshniv
- Silets
- Slobidka
- Staryi Kryvotuly (Krasylivka)
- Staryi Lysets
- Stebnyk
- Stryhantsi
- Tiaziv
- Uhryniv
- Uzyn
- Vilshanytsia
- Yamnytsia
- Zahvizdia

Ten most populous

- Tysmenytsia 9,720
- Cherniiv 3,972
- Stary Lysets 3,795
- Zahvizdya 3,684
- Yamnytsia 3,358
- Uhryniv 3,227
- Stari Kryvotuly 3,112
- Chornoliztsi 3,097
- Radcha 3,062
- Yezupil 3,026

Most of the populous municipalities were located next to Ivano-Frankivsk city virtually serving as the extraterritorial units of it (suburbs). The smallest municipality of the raion was the Posich municipality which in 2001 accounted to only 84 residents. Note that as a settlement Posich was not the smallest.
