= Uhornyky, Ivano-Frankivsk Raion, Ivano-Frankivsk Oblast =

Uhornyky Угорники Uhorniki
- Village
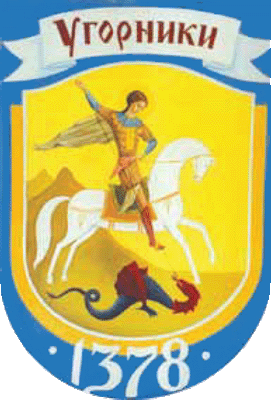
- Coat of arms

- Location of Uhornyky, Ivano-Frankivsk Oblast Uhornyky (Ukraine)
- Coordinates: 48°55′15″N 24°45′36″E
- Country: Ukraine
- Oblast: Ivano-Frankivsk Oblast
- Raion: Ivano-Frankivsk Raion
- Established: 1378

Area
  - Total: 6.73 km^{2} (2.60 sq mi)

Population (2024)
  - Total: 2,735
  - Density: 406/km^{2} (1,050/sq mi)
- Postal code: 76492
- Area code: +380 0342

Uhornyky (Ukrainian: Угорники, Polish: Uhorniki) is a village of the Ivano-Frankivsk Raion, Ivano-Frankivsk Oblast, in Western Ukraine. It belongs to Ivano-Frankivsk urban hromada, one of the hromadas of Ukraine.

The village is located just east of Ivano-Frankivsk, separated from the city by the river Bystrytsia of Nadvirna. South of it is located the village of Mykytyntsi, while in the north Uhornyky borders with a village of Pidluzhia. East of the village is located a village of the Pidpechary.

Until 18 July 2020, Uhornyky belonged to Ivano-Frankivsk Municipality. The municipality was abolished in July 2020 as part of the administrative reform of Ukraine, which reduced the number of raions of Ivano-Frankivsk Oblast to six. The area of Ivano-Frankivsk Municipality was merged into Ivano-Frankivsk Raion.

== Personalities ==
- Stepan Vytvytskyi (1884–1965), the president of Ukrainian People's Republic in exile, lawyer, journalist, member of the Ukrainian National-Democratic Party.
