= Ivano-Frankivsk Municipality =

Former subdivision of Ivano-Frankivsk Oblast, Ukraine

Ivano-Frankivsk Municipality Івано-Франківська міська рада
- City of regional importance
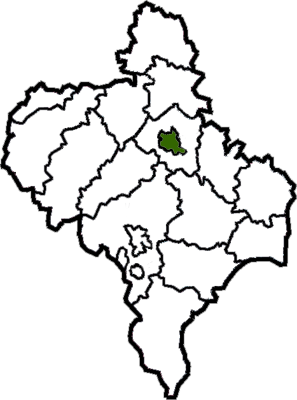
- Coordinates: 48°55′21″N 24°42′40″E
- Country: Ukraine
- Region: Ivano-Frankivsk Oblast
- Created: 1940
- Seat: Ivano-Frankivsk
- Village councils: 5: Khryplyn; Krykhivtsi; Mykytyntsi; Uhornyky; Vovchynets

Government
  - Body: City council
  - Mayor: Ruslan Martsinkiv

Area
  - City of regional importance: 125.90 km^{2} (48.61 sq mi)
  - Urban: 83.73 km^{2} (32.33 sq mi)
  - Rural: 42.17 km^{2} (16.28 sq mi)
- Elevation: 244 m (801 ft)

Population
  - City of regional importance: 230,443
  - Estimate (2020): 263,359
  - Density: 1,830.4/km^{2} (4,740.6/sq mi)
  - Urban: 237,686
  - Urban density: 2,839/km^{2} (7,352/sq mi)
  - Rural: 25,673
  - Rural density: 608.8/km^{2} (1,577/sq mi)

Demographics
  - Ukrainians: 92.3%
  - Russians: 6.0%
  - Others: 1.7%
- Website: rada.gov.ua

Ivano-Frankivsk Municipality is a former administrative subdivision of Ivano-Frankivsk Oblast located within the Tysmenytsia Raion and completely surrounded by that raion. It consisted of the city of Ivano-Frankivsk, the administrative center of the oblast, and a number of rural localities. Population: 263,359 (2020 est.).

== Overview ==
The municipality was created before the World War II in 1940 after reorganization of the Stanisławów Voivodeship. In 1962 the official name of it changed from Stanislav to Ivano-Frankivsk after the administrative center. It was located within the Tysmenytsia District and consists of one city municipality and five rural ones. Through the municipality flow two major rivers of the region Bystrytsia Solotvynska and Bystrytsia Nadvirnianska and one smaller one Vorona. Most of the territory is flat, however there are some elevated areas in northern parts near Vovchynets known as Vovchynets Hills. There is also several lakes located within the city of Ivano-Frankivsk around which stretches a city park.

Administratively, until 2020, Ivano-Frankivsk was designated the city of oblast significance, and Ivano-Frankivsk Municipality was the territory subordinated to Ivano-Frankivsk City Council. On 18 July 2020, as part of the administrative reform of Ukraine, the number of raions of Ivano-Frankivsk Oblast was reduced to six, and Ivano-Frankivsk Municipality was abolished as an administrative subdivision and merged into Ivano-Frankivsk Raion. The last estimate of the municipality population was 622,012 (2020 est.).

== Demographics ==
Historical population
| Year | Pop. | ±% |
|---|---|---|
| 2001 | 230,443 | — |
| 2007 | 238,273 | +3.4% |
| 2008 | 239,559 | +0.5% |
| 2009 | 240,508 | +0.4% |
| 2010 | 241,056 | +0.2% |
| 2013 | 243,715 | +1.1% |
| 2016 | 251,509 | +3.2% |
Note: 2010 data is valid thru October; Source: Regional Statistics Office

== Government ==
The city has its own council that is considered to be the main governing body of the municipality and is subordinated to the regional authorities (Ivano-Frankivsk Oblast).

The executive body is headed by the city's mayor who is charge of his/hers executive committee.

- City's Mayor
  - Department of patronage service
  - Legal department
  - Department on issues of activities of law enforcement agencies, defense and mobilization operations
  - Department of accounting records and reporting
  - Finance department
  - Department of permit-conciliation procedures (Permit Center of Ivano-Frankivsk city)
  - Department of State registration (Registration Chamber)
  - Department on issues of Emergency situations
  - Service of prompt response
- Secretary of the City Council
  - Department in assistance for the members of council
  - Department of internal policy
  - Expert-analytic department
- Executive Committee
  - First Deputy of the city's Mayor
    - Department of Architecture and Urban Development
    - Department of Capital Construction
    - Department of registration and allocation of housing
    - Department of Land Relations
    - Communal Property Fund of the territorial community Ivano-Frankivsk City
    - Assistant of the First Deputy of the city's Mayor
  - Deputy of the city's Mayor - Department Director of Communal Living, Transportation and Communication
    - Department of Communal Living, Transportation and Communication
    - Assistant of the Deputy of the city's Mayor
  - Deputy of the city's Mayor
    - Department of Economic and Integral Development
    - Department of Trade
    - Assistant of the Deputy of the city's Mayor
  - Deputy of the city's Mayor
    - Department on issues of Family, Youth and Gender policy
    - Department on issues of Cultural Heritage Preservation
    - Service of Children Affairs
    - Department of Education and Science
    - Committee on Fitness and Sports
    - City's Center of social services for family, children and youth
    - Department of Social Policy
    - Central City Clinical Hospital
    - Assistant of the Deputy of the city's Mayor
  - Administrative manager
    - Department of organizational and information work and control
    - General Department
    - Commercial Department
    - Department of public appeals
    - Department of Human Resources
    - Department of software and computer support
    - Department of Archives
    - Administrative Commission
    - City headquarters of public formations on protection of public order
    - Department on Keeping the State Registry of voters
    - Secretary-referent

== Infrastructure ==
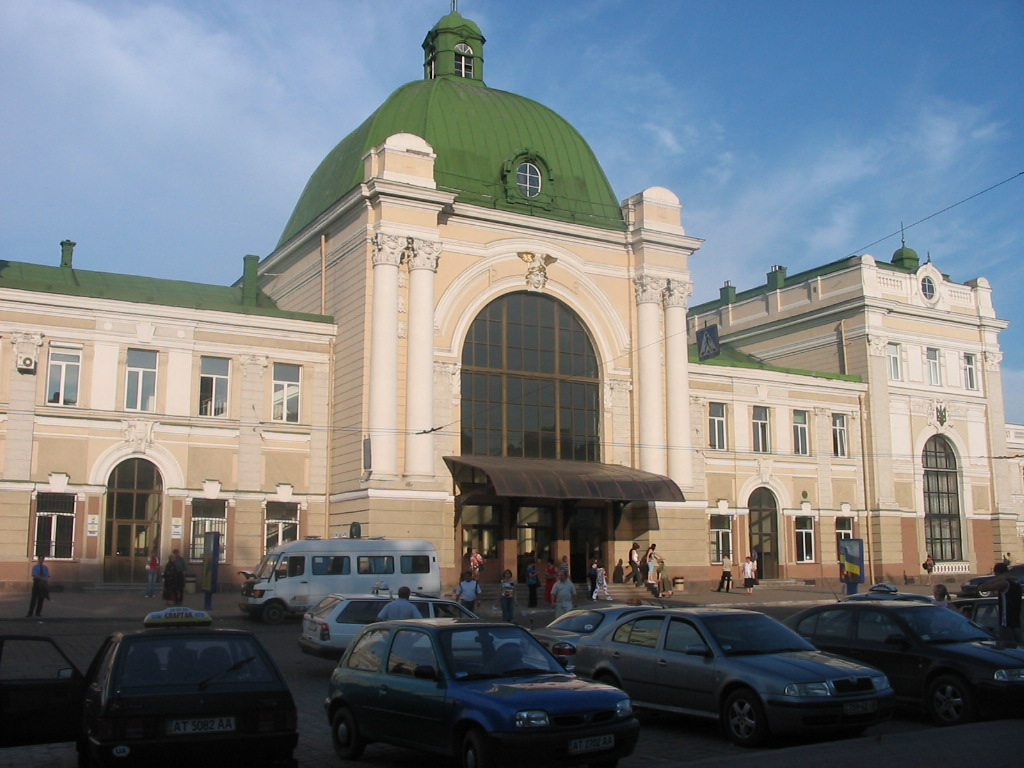
Ivano-Frankivsk Railway Station

Public transportation

The city of Ivano-Frankivsk has an extensive network of public transport including buses, trolleybuses, and taxis. There are nine trolleybus routes and about 52 for regular buses. Some of the routes run beyond the city into nearby villages.

Railway transportation

There is one railway terminal locally known as Vokzal. There are also smaller rail stations in the adjacent villages such as Uhryniv, Khryplyn, and other. All of them are part of the Lviv Railways.

Bus transportation

Until 2008 the railway terminal also housed a bus terminal which provided several inter-city bus routes, including some to international destinations. In 2000 construction work began on a new bus terminal next to the railway terminus on Zaliznychna Street. Inauguration of the new bus terminal took place on May 22, 2010. At the opening ceremony the mayor of the city, Viktor Anuškevičius, noted that the new bus terminal was only partially completed, and for a period it would be necessary to offload at the Pryvokzalna Square, which is already saturated with traffic. He also emphasised the need for another bus station on the outskirts of the city.

Airways transportation

The city is served by the Ivano-Frankivsk International Airport, which was granted international status in 1992. The airport shares its facilities with the 114 Brigade of the Ukrainian Air Force. Since 2002 the airport has been leased to the private enterprise company "Yavson", and from 2005 the Public limited company "Naftokhimik Prykarpattia", a (subsidiary of Ukrnafta) with whom the contract expires in 2013.

=== Streets ===
Full list of renamed streets (in Ukrainian)

All street names reflecting the city's Soviet or Russian past have been returned to their former names, or given new names of national historic importance, or other non-controversial name. For example, Gagarin Street (connecting the city with its suburbs) became Vovchynets Street, Suvorov Street is now Harbar Street, and Soviet Street is Nezalezhnist Street (meaning Independence).

Around 100 other streets were renamed.

Important transportation arteries

- Independence Street (vulytsya Nezalezhnosti) / Tysmenytsya Road (doroha Tysmenetska)
- Halych Road (vulytsya Halytska)
- Hetman Mazepa Street (vulytsya Hetmana Mazepy) / Krykhivtsi Road (doroha Krykhivetska)
- Yevhen Konovalets Road (vulytsya Yevhena Konovaltsya)
- Vovchynets Street (vulytsya Vovchynetska)
- Vasyl Stefanyk Shore Drive (naberezhna Vasylya Stefanyka)

=== Routes ===
The city of Ivano-Frankivsk is located on the intersection of three major national (Ukraine) routes: H 18, H 09, and H 10. There also is one important regional route T09-06. All the H-routes eventually connect to E50.

- H 18 connects Ivano-Frankivsk with Ternopil. It starts at the intersection of Sichovi Striltsi Street and Halych Street - Hetman Mazepa Street. At this point the route connects to H-09. H-18 takes Sichovi Striltsi Street east where after couple of miles connects to Yevhen Konovalets Street (T09-06), passing which continues on, until merges into Nezalezhnist Street and heads towards the edge of the city eastward. Once beyond the city its name changes to Tysmenytsia Street (or Tysmenytsia Road) which heads straight to the city of Tysmenytsia, not far from Ivano-Frnkivsk.
- H 10 is actually of an international level, coming through the city from Stryi (Lviv Oblast) and going to Moldova, passing on its way Chernivtsi. Heading towards Ivano-Frankivsk from Kalush as Kalush Chaussée, after the village of Pavlivka west of the village of Uhryniv the route spurs three ways with one branch (southeast) continues on as Kalush Chaussée merging with H-09 at the intersection with Halych Street - Horbachevsky Street and then continues as Fedkovych Street (H-09); and another one (southwest) comes around the city on the west side through the village of Pilissya and intersects H-09 south of the village of Drahormychany. Note that at this point for a short distance both routes use one and the same road. From there H-10 continues on independently towards Chernivtsi crossing the T09-06 route near village of Cherniiv. One more branch H-10 (northeast) is very small and connects the H-10 spur point (northwest of Ivano-Frankivsk) with the village of Uhryniv and then comes back to the Kalush Chaussée.

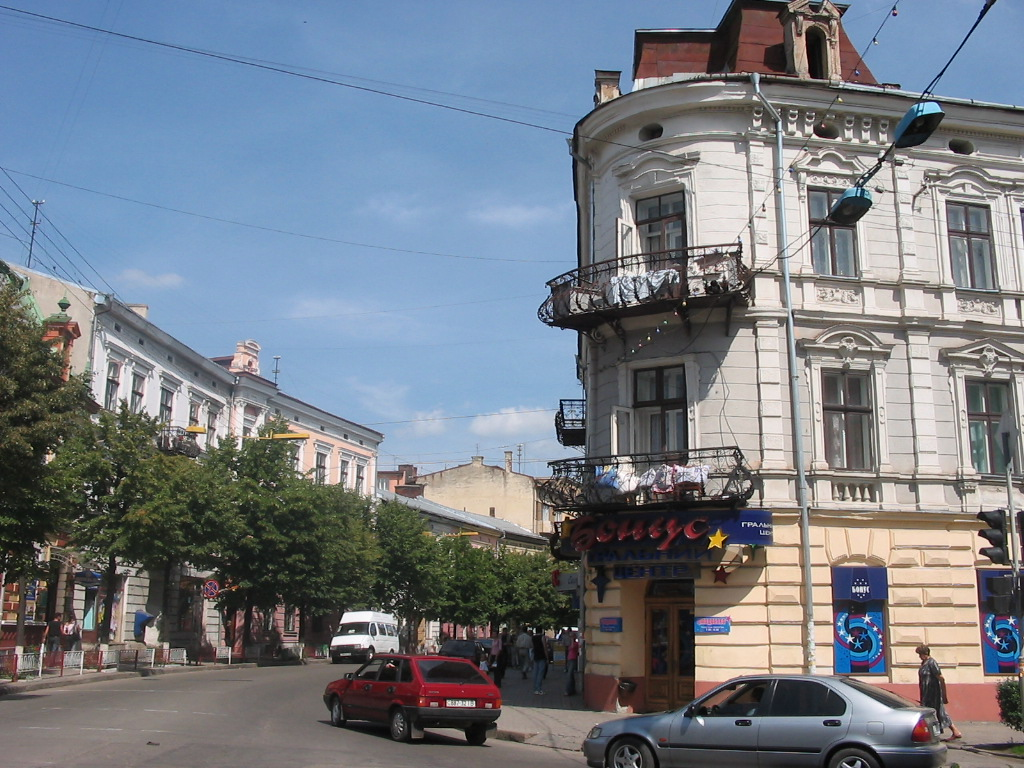
Intersection of Halych Street (into the picture) and Sichovi Striltsi Street (to the right) view in the north direction.

- H 09 is sort of a detour route that first travels south from Lviv to Rakhiv and then turns west to Mukacheve. Through Ivano-Frankivsk H-09 makes a lot turns and changes its name using the local streets of the city. It comes to Ivano-Frankivsk from Halych by Halych Street (or Halych Road) to the intersection with Kalush Chaussée - Fedkovych Street where it merges with H-10 and continues on turning southeast onto Fedkovych Street as H-09 and later as Halych Street. Once in the downtown H-09 swerves southwest and intersects Sichovi Striltsi Street that going eastward as the route H-18. After the intersection the street heads straight as Hetman Mazepa Street in the southwestern direction. After crossing Dovzhenko Street it leaves the city limits as Krykhivtsi Street (or Krykhivtsi Road). Upon leaving Krykhivtsi and passing Drahomyrchany on the east, H-09 makes a break in the route H-10 (mentioned above). After that H-09 heads southwest towards the city of Nadvirna, on the way bypassing the town of Bohorodchany.
- T09-06 is a regional route that runs within the Ivano-Frankivsk Oblast. It is a direct road from the Ivano-Frankivsk city to the Nadvirna city unlike H-09, with the final destination being the village of Bystrytsia. T09-06 starts at the intersection of Sichovi Striltsi Street and Konovalets Street heading directly south onto Konovalets Street (or Konovalets Road). It leaves the city west of the Khryplyn village before crossing one of the Bystrytsia rivers. Shortly T09-06 also crosses the H-10 route continuing south.

=== Rural-urban fringe districts ===
As a lot of regional centers in Ukraine and the former Soviet Union, Ivano-Frankivsk is also notorious for its rural-urban fringe panel building residential districts.

- BAM
- Kaskad
- Positron
- Budivelnykiv

== City's industries ==
Extracting

- Ivano-Frankivsk Specialized open-pit mining

Energy

- Open joint-stock company “Prykarpattyaoblenergo”
- Government urban enterprise "Ivano-Frankivskteplokomunenergo"
- Ivano-Frankivskgaz, part of State Company "Gaz of Ukraine"

Utilities

- KP Ivano-Frankivskvodoekotekhprom serving cities of Ivano-Frankivsk, Tysmenytsya and adjacent villages
  - Cherniiv Complex of Water-purification Structures
  - Water-pump stations: "Khryplyn", "Berehova", "Kruhla"
  - Station of biomechanical purification (Yamnytsya village)

Khryplyn Investment-Industrial Zone

The industrial zone is located just east of Ivano-Frankivsk across Bystrytsia river in the village of Khryplyn. There is a well established railroad station. In 2007–2008 the infrastructure of the area was improved heavily with an installation of additional pipelines of water and gas as well as electrification and road improvement.

- "Ukrainska pobutova tekhnika" (Ukrainian Home Appliances)
- "Tyco Electronics Ukraine Ltd."
- OJSC "Pressmash"
- "Hyrych"
- OJSC "Budivelni materialy" (Construction materials)

Construction and Architecture

- "Comfortbud" (Lviv) along with "Beton Group" concrete producing factories
- "Energobud" (Ivano-Frankivsk)
- "Ekstim" (Ivano-Frankivsk)
- "Prykarpatspetsbud"
- "Prykarpatzhytlobud"
- OJSC "Zhytlobud"
- Build-investment firm «Skol»
- Architecture Company "Atelie Arkhitektury" (Ivano-Frankivsk)

Machine-building

- Ivano-Frankivsk Locomotive Repair Plant
- OJSC "Ivano-Frankivsk Valve Plant"
- "Avtolyvmash"
- "Rodon"
- "Promprylad" (Industrial instruments)

Food-producing

The city has numerous food-producing factories, liquor factory, several bakeries, others.

Strategical

- 63rd Boiling and Welding Plant

== City's radio, television, press media ==
Press

- "Reporter" - Ivano-Frankivsk weekly
- "Halytsky Korrespondent" - a social-political weekly
- "Halychyna" - regional newspaper

Radio

- "Zakhidny Polyus (104.3 FM)" - city's radio
- "Vezha (107 FM)" - city's radio

Television

- "Ivano-Frankivsk ODTRK" - regional State Tele and Radio Company
- "3-Studia" - regional Tele and Radio Company
- "Halychyna" - regional television

== Administration ==
Both city and oblast administrations as well as the regional council are all located in a massive white building on the Hrushevsky Street locally known as Bily Dim or Bily Budynok. In front of the building is a big open space bordered by Shpytalna Street on the north-east, Hrushevsky Street on the south-east, and Melnychuk Street on the south-west. Next to the building is located a memorial to the Unification of the Western Ukraine with the rest of Ukraine. The main feature of the memorial is a tall marble stele, on both sides of which are located statues: Kameniar (west) and Kobzar (east).

=== City's Council ===
The city's council currently consists of 60 deputies. The political representation of the V convocation by political bloks was elected as such: Our Ukraine 22 (Our Ukraine 9, Rukh 8, United Centre 1, Industrialists and Entrepreneurs 2, no affiliation 2), BYuT 17 (Batkivschyna 14, USDP 2, no affiliation 1), Ukrainian People's Party 14 (UPP 3, CUN 1, United Centre 3, Sobor 1, no affiliation 6), Party of Regions 4 (Party of Regions 3, no affiliation 1), PORA 3 (PORA 2, no affiliation 1).

=== Recent city mayors ===
- Bohdan Borovych (OUN) July 1994 – June 1998
- Zinoviy Shkutiak (Our Ukraine) March 1998 – March 26, 2006
- Viktor Anushkevičius (UPP) March 26, 2006 – December 1, 2015
- Ruslan Martcinkiv (Svoboda) December 1, 2015 – present

=== Administrative division ===
| Municipality City | Population | Area km^{2} | Type | Number of settlements | Water resources (if available) |
|---|---|---|---|---|---|
| Ivano-Frankivsk | 215,288 | 83.73 | city | 1 | Bystrytsia Solotvynska; Bystrytsia Nadvirnianska |
| Khryplyn | 1,887 | 9.58 | rural | 1 | Bystrytsia Nadvirnianska |
| Krykhivtsi | 4,125 | 6.70 | rural | 1 | Bystrytsia Solotvynska |
| Mykytyntsi | 3,268 | 1.27 | rural | 1 | Bystrytsia Nadvirnianska |
| Uhornyky | 3,228 | 6.73 | rural | 1 | Bystrytsia Nadvirnianska |
| Vovchynets | 2,647 | 7.89 | rural | 1 | Bystrytsia Solotvynska; Bystrytsia Nadvirnianska |
| Total rural | 15,155 | 42.17 | x | x | x |
