= Yamnytsia =

Rural locality in Ivano-Frankivsk Oblast, Ukraine

Coordinates: 48.990°N 24.709°E

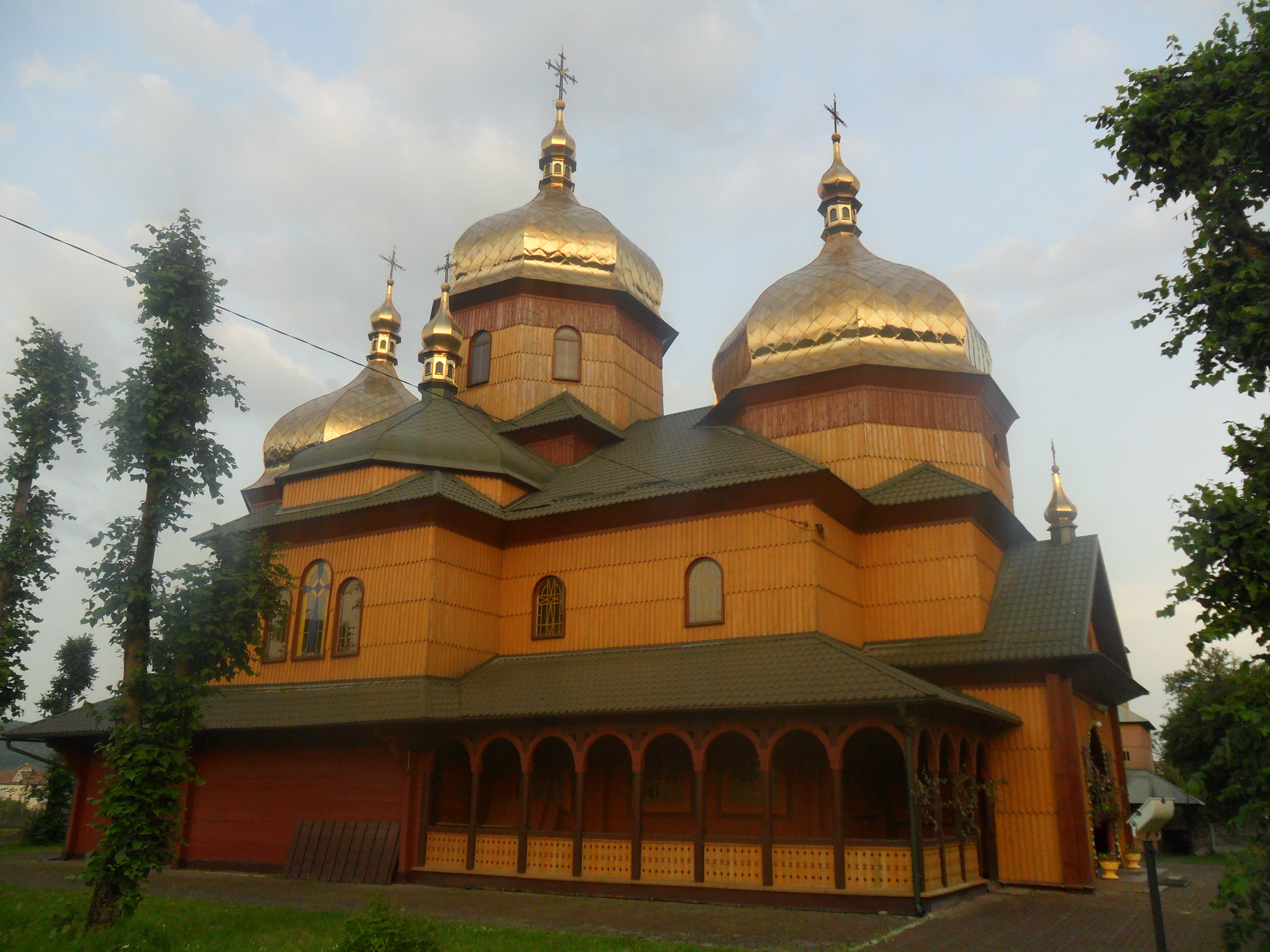
Church of Saint Nicholas

Yamnytsia (Ukrainian: Ямниця, Polish: Jamnica) is a village of Ivano-Frankivsk Raion, Ivano-Frankivsk Oblast, Ukraine, just few miles north from Ivano-Frankivsk. It hosts the administration of Yamnytsia rural hromada, one of the hromadas of Ukraine. The village is better known for the Battle of Yamnytsia during the Kerensky Offensive, when the Russian Imperial Army successfully secured area north of Stanislau for a brief period of time (June 27–July 6, 1917). During the battle, all the Kornilov Strike regiment soldiers were awarded the Cross of St. George.

Until 18 July 2020, Yamnytsia belonged to Tysmenytsia Raion. The raion was abolished in July 2020 as part of the administrative reform of Ukraine, which reduced the number of raions of Ivano-Frankivsk Oblast to six. The area of Tysmenytsia Raion was merged into Ivano-Frankivsk Raion.

Today the village is better known for the chemical factory Barva that was built in 1975 as a factory of fine organic syntheses.

Yamnytsia is connected with Ivano-Frankivsk by means of public transport, such as trolleybus and local train services.
