= Kolodiivka, Ivano-Frankivsk Oblast =

Rural locality in Ivano-Frankivsk Oblast, Ukraine

Kolodiivka Колодіївка
- Village
- Location of Kolodiivka in Ivano-Frankivsk Oblast
- Coordinates: 48°58′44″N 24°46′02″E
- Country: Ukraine
- Oblast: Ivano-Frankivsk Oblast
- District: Ivano-Frankivsk Raion
- Founded: 12th century

Area
  - Total: 8.93 km^{2} (3.45 sq mi)
- Elevation: 301 m (988 ft)

Population (2001)
  - Total: 571
  - Density: 63.9/km^{2} (166/sq mi)
- Time zone: UTC+2 (EET)
  - Summer (DST): UTC+3 (EEST)
- Postal code: 77435
- Area code: +380 3436
- Website: http://rada.gov.ua/

Kolodiivka (Ukrainian: Колодіївка, Polish: Kołodziejówka) is a village in Ivano-Frankivsk Raion (district) of Ivano-Frankivsk Oblast in western Ukraine. It belongs to Ivano-Frankivsk urban hromada, one of the hromadas of Ukraine. The village's population was 571 as of the 2001 Ukrainian census.

The settlement was first founded in the 12th century as Fedkovo (Ukrainian: Федьково); in 1466, the village was renamed to its current name, Kolodiivka.

It is located in the northern portion of the oblast on the Bystrytsia Solotvynska River at an elevation of 301 m (988 ft). The village maintains its own local government as the Kolodiivka Village Council (Ukrainian: Колодіївська сільська рада), which consists of 16 locally elected deputies.

Until 18 July 2020, Kolodiivka belonged to Tysmenytsia Raion. The raion was abolished in July 2020 as part of the administrative reform of Ukraine, which reduced the number of raions of Ivano-Frankivsk Oblast to six. The area of Tysmenytsia Raion was merged into Ivano-Frankivsk Raion.
