= Lysets =

Rural locality in Ivano-Frankivsk Oblast, Ukraine

Lysets Лисець
- Rural settlement
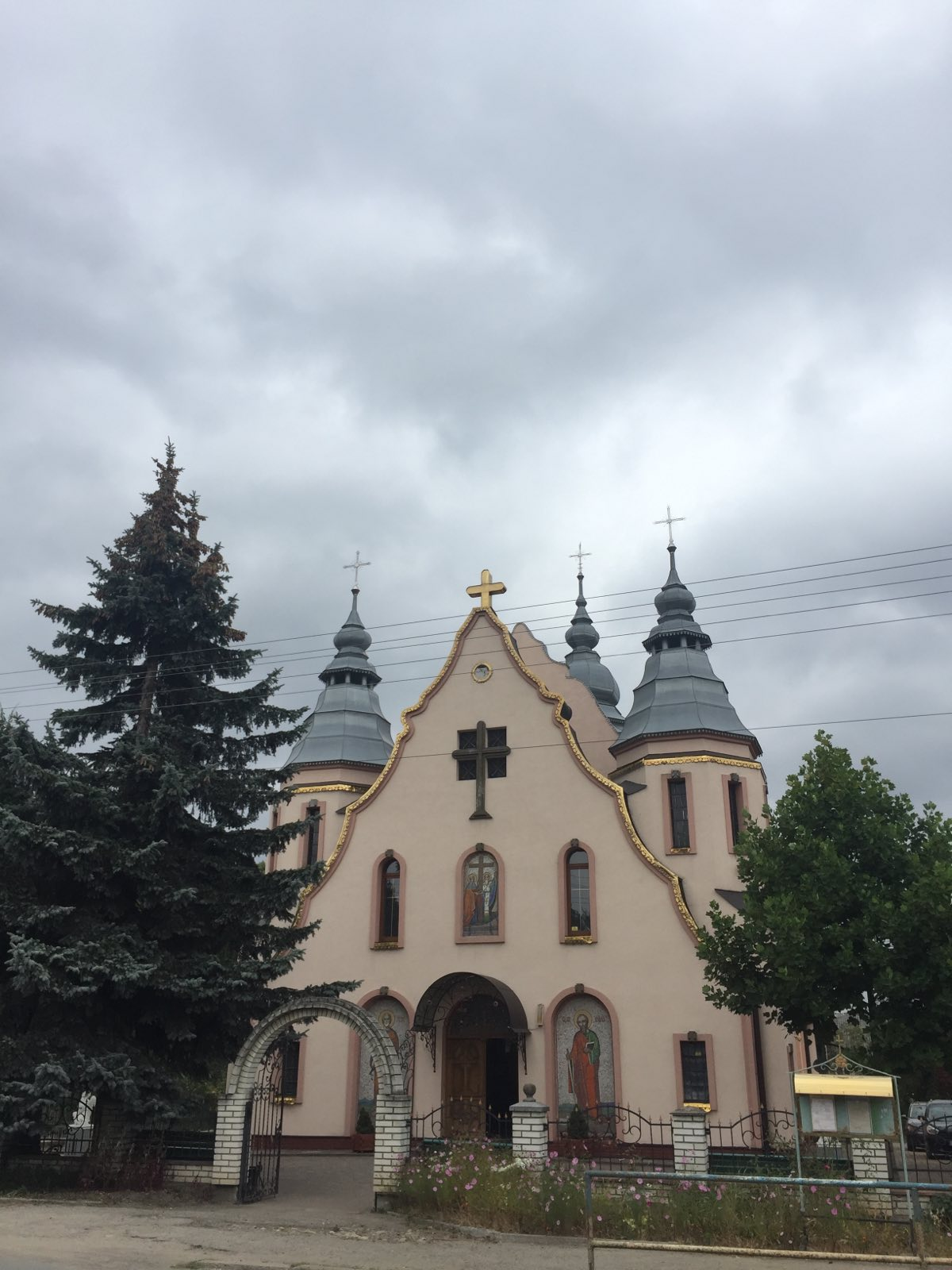
- Exaltation of the Holy Cross church

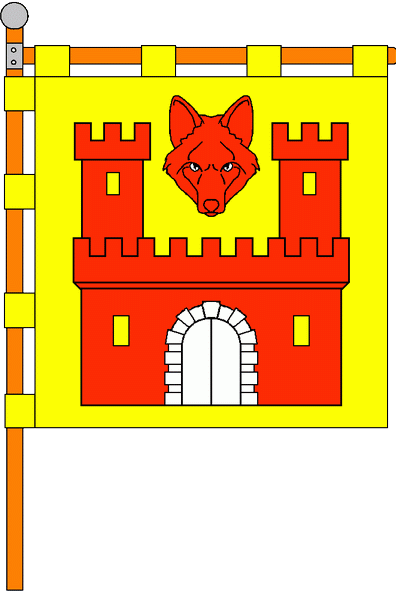
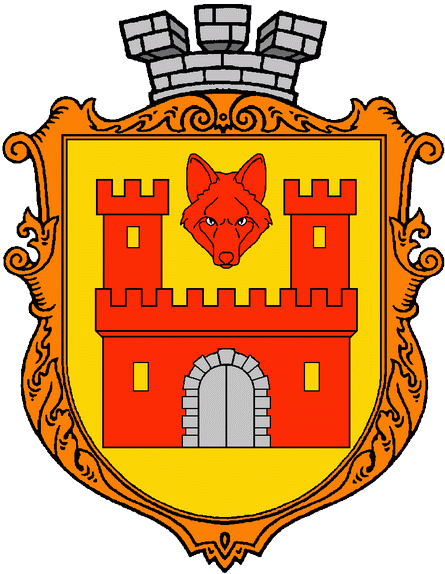
- Flag Coat of arms
- Interactive map of Lysets
- Location within Ivano-Frankivsk Oblast Location within Ukraine
- Coordinates: 48°48′36″N 24°11′24″E
- Country: Ukraine
- Oblast: Ivano-Frankivsk Oblast
- Raion: Ivano-Frankivsk Raion

Population (2022)
  - Total: 2,910

Lysets (Ukrainian: Лисець; Polish: Łysiec) is a rural settlement in Ivano-Frankivsk Raion, Ivano-Frankivsk Oblast, Ukraine, located 10 kilometres (6.2 mi) from the administrative center of the oblast, Ivano-Frankivsk. It hosts the administration of Lysets settlement hromada, one of the hromadas of Ukraine. Population: 2,910 (2022 estimate).

== History ==
Łysiec, as it was known in Polish, formed part of the Kingdom of Poland until the First Partition of Poland in 1772, when it was annexed by Austria. Łysiec was home to one of the communities of Armenians in Poland.

Following the joint German-Soviet invasion of Poland, which started World War II in September 1939, the town was occupied by the Soviets until 1941, then by Germany until 1944, and then re-occupied by the Soviets in 1944, and eventually annexed from Poland in 1945.

Until 18 July 2020, Lysets belonged to Tysmenytsia Raion. The raion was abolished in July 2020 as part of the administrative reform of Ukraine, which reduced the number of raions of Ivano-Frankivsk Oblast to six. The area of Tysmenytsia Raion was merged into Ivano-Frankivsk Raion.

Until 26 January 2024, Lysets was designated urban-type settlement. On this day, a new law entered into force which abolished this status, and Lysets became a rural settlement.
