= Lysets settlement hromada =

Hromada in Ivano-Frankivsk Oblast, Ukraine

Lysets settlement hromada Лисецька селищна громада
- hromada
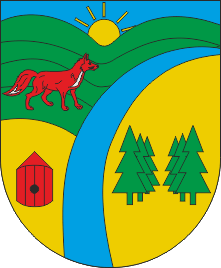
- Seal

- Location within Ivano-Frankivsk Oblast Location within Ukraine
- Coordinates: 48°52′18″N 24°36′17″E
- Country: Ukraine
- Oblast: Ivano-Frankivsk Oblast
- Raion: Ivano-Frankivsk Raion
- Administrative center: Lysets

Area
  - Total: 837 km^{2} (323 sq mi)

Population (2020)
  - Total: 7,367
- Rural settlement: 1
- Villages: 3
- Website: lsr.gov.ua

Lysets settlement hromada (Ukrainian: Лисецька селищна громада) is a hromada in Ukraine, in Ivano-Frankivsk Raion of Ivano-Frankivsk Oblast. The administrative center is the rural settlement of Lysets.

== Settlements ==
The hromada consists of 1 rural settlement (Lysets) and 3 villages:

- Posich
- Staryi Lysets
- Stebnyk
