= Ivano-Frankivsk urban hromada =

Territorial hromada in Ivano-Frankivsk Oblast, Ukraine

Ivano-Frankivsk urban hromada Івано-Франківська міська громада
- Hromada
- Interactive map of Ivano-Frankivsk urban hromada
- Country: Ukraine
- Oblast: Ivano-Frankivsk
- Raion: Ivano-Frankivsk

Area
  - Total: 263.8 km^{2} (101.9 sq mi)

Population (2023)
  - Total: 287,533
  - Density: 1,090/km^{2} (2,823/sq mi)
- Settlements: 19
- Cities: 1
- Villages: 18
- Website: mrada.if.ua

Ivano-Frankivsk urban territorial hromada (Ukrainian: Івано-Франківська міська територіальна громада, romanized: Ivano-Frankivska miska terytorialna hromada) is a hromada located in Ivano-Frankivsk Oblast, in western Ukraine. Its administrative centre is the city of Ivano-Frankivsk.

Ivano-Frankivsk urban hromada has an area of 263.8 km^{2} (101.9 mi^{2}), as well as a population of 287,533 (as of 2023).

== Settlements ==
In addition to the city of Ivano-Frankivsk, the hromada includes 18 villages:

- Berezivka
- Bratkivtsi
- Vovchynets
- Dobrovliany
- Drahomyrchany
- Kaminne
- Kolodiyivka
- Krykhivtsi
- Mykytyntsi
- Pidluzhzhia
- Pidpechery
- Radcha
- Tysmenychany
- Uhornyky
- Uzyn
- Khryplyn
- Cherniyiv
- Chukalivka
