= Radcha, Ivano-Frankivsk Oblast =

Radcha Радча
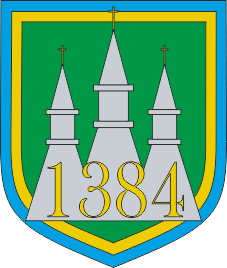
- Coat of arms

- Location within Ivano-Frankivsk Oblast Location within Ukraine
- Country: Ukraine
- Oblast: Ivano-Frankivsk Oblast
- Raion: Ivano-Frankivsk Raion
- Hromada: Ivano-Frankivsk urban hromada
- Established: 1606

Area
  - Total: 1,649 km^{2} (637 sq mi)
- Elevation: 290 m (950 ft)

Population (2022)
  - Total: 3,300
  - Density: 2.0/km^{2} (5.2/sq mi)
- Time zone: UTC+2 (EET)
  - Summer (DST): UTC+3 (EEST)
- Postal code: 77457
- Area code: +380 3436

Radcha (Ukrainian: Ра́дча) is a village in Ukraine, located in Ivano-Frankivsk urban hromada, Ivano-Frankivsk Raion, Ivano-Frankivsk Oblast.
