= Ivano-Frankivsk Raion =

Subdivision of Ivano-Frankivsk Oblast, Ukraine

Ivano-Frankivsk Raion Івано-Франківський район
- Raion
- Ivano-Frankivskyi raion
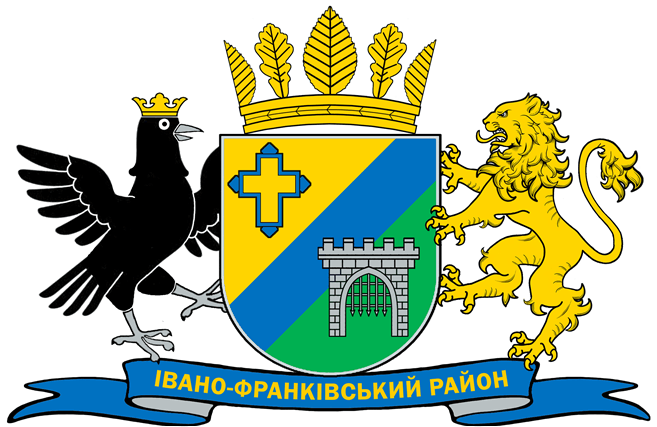
- Flag Coat of arms

- Interactive map of Ivano-Frankivsk Raion
- Country: Ukraine
- Oblast: Ivano-Frankivsk Oblast
- Established: 2020
- Admin. center: Ivano-Frankivsk
- Subdivisions: 7 hromadas

Area
  - Total: 3,910 km^{2} (1,510 sq mi)

Population (2022)
  - Total: 556,104
  - Density: 142/km^{2} (368/sq mi)
- Time zone: UTC+02:00 (EET)
  - Summer (DST): UTC+03:00 (EEST)
- Postal index: N/A

Ivano-Frankivsk Raion (Ukrainian: Івано-Франківський район) is a raion (district) of Ivano-Frankivsk Oblast, Ukraine. It was created in July 2020 as part of the reform of administrative divisions of Ukraine. The center of the raion is the city of Ivano-Frankivsk. Five abolished raions, Bohorodchany, Halych, Rohatyn, Tlumach, and Tysmenytsia raions, as well as Ivano-Frankivsk and Burshtyn Municipalities, were merged into Ivano-Frankivsk Raion. Population: 556,104 (2022 estimate).

== Subdivisions ==
At the time of establishment, the raion consisted of 20 hromadas:

- Bilshivtsi settlement hromada with the administration in the rural settlement of Bilshivtsi, transferred from Halych Raion;
- Bohorodchany settlement hromada with the administration in the rural settlement of Bohorodchany, transferred from Bohorodchany Raion;
- Bukachivtsi settlement hromada with the administration in the rural settlement of Bukachivtsi, transferred from Rohatyn Raion;
- Burshtyn urban hromada with the administration in the city of Burshtyn, transferred from Burshtyn Municipality;
- Dubivtsi rural hromada with the administration in the selo of Dubivtsi, transferred from Halych Raion;
- Dzvyniach rural hromada with the administration in the selo of Dzvyniach, transferred from Bohorodchany Raion;
- Halych urban hromada with the administration in the city of Halych, transferred from Halych Raion;
- Ivano-Frankivsk urban hromada with the administration in the city of Ivano-Frankivsk, transferred from Ivano-Frankivsk Municipality;
- Lysets settlement hromada with the administration in the rural settlement of Lysets, transferred from Tysmenytsia Raion;
- Obertyn settlement hromada with the administration in the rural settlement of Obertyn, transferred from Tlumach Raion;
- Olesha rural hromada with the administration in the selo of Olesha, transferred from Tlumach Raion;
- Rohatyn urban hromada with the administration in the city of Rohatyn, transferred from Rohatyn Raion;
- Solotvyn settlement hromada with the administration in the rural settlement of Solotvyn, transferred from Bohorodchany Raion;
- Stari Bohorodchany rural hromada with the administration in the selo of Stari Bohorodchany, transferred from Bohorodchany Raion;
- Tlumach urban hromada with the administration in the city of Tlumach, transferred from Tlumach Raion;
- Tysmenytsia urban hromada with the administration in the city of Tysmenytsia, transferred from Tysmenytsia Raion;
- Uhryniv rural hromada with the administration in the selo of Uhryniv, transferred from Tysmenytsia Raion;
- Yamnytsia rural hromada with the administration in the selo of Yamnytsia, transferred from Tysmenytsia Raion;
- Yezupil settlement hromada with the administration in the rural settlement of Yezupil, transferred from Tysmenytsia Raion;
- Zahvizdia rural hromada with the administration in the selo of Zahvizdia, transferred from Tysmenytsia Raion.
