= Eastern Carpathian Foothills =

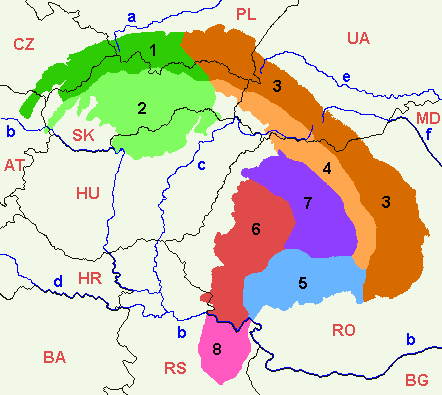
Map of the main divisions of the Carpathians.: 1. Outer Western Carpathians; 2. Inner Western Carpathians; 3. Outer Eastern Carpathians; 4. Inner Eastern Carpathians; 5. Southern Carpathians; 6. Western Romanian Carpathians; 7. Transylvanian Plateau; 8. Serbian Carpathians

Eastern Carpathian Foothills as a geographical term designates transitional region in the western parts of Ukraine and northeastern parts of Romania, between Eastern Carpathian Mountains to the southwest and number of plain regions to the east and north (bordering Moldavian Plateau to the southeast and east, Podillia Upland to the northeast and east, Roztochia Upland to the north, Sian Lowland to the northwest). Its average elevation is around 300–500 m (980–1,640 ft) above sea level. The region stretches across Lviv, Ivano-Frankivsk and Chernivtsi Oblasts and Suceava County.

== Description ==
The region represents a portion of a large foredeep (Carpathian Foredeep) that formed during the Miocene epoch in front of the folding Carpathian Mountains. The outer zone of the foredeep has as its foundation the Podolian Platform; the inner zone consists of severely dislocated flysch deposits. The foredeep itself is filled with thick Miocene deposits of clays, argillites, calcareous clays, and sandstones covered by diluvial and alluvial deposits.

At the end of the Pliocene epoch the region was an accumulative-denudational peneplain covered by fluvial deposits of sand, silt, and clay originating from the Carpathians. As a result of an uplift at the end of the Pliocene and the beginning of the Pleistocene epoch, the rivers intensified their erosion and sculpted into the surface a number of wide valleys, lowlands, and intervening ridges.

The uplift of Eastern Carpathian Foothills was not uniform, however, and the relief features are partly of tectonic origin. In the Dnieper glacial phase the northeastern part of Eastern Carpathian Foothills was occupied by a lobe of the European continental glacier, and the meltwaters temporarily ponded. By the end of the Pleistocene epoch the region was covered by deposits of loess. At present the rivers from the Carpathian Mountains, most notably the Stryi River, carry silt and sand on to Eastern Carpathian Foothills and deposit them in their floodplains.

== Regions ==
- Upper Dniester Depression
- Kalush Depression
- Voinyliv Upland
- Stanyslaviv Depression
- Pokuttia Upland
- Bukovinian Subcarpathians
  - Chernivtsi Upland
  - Storozhynets Plateau

Intervalley ridges rise above the region 80–120 m (260–390 ft) or more. The highest point, Mount Tsetsyna, near Chernivtsi has elevation of 537 m (1,762 ft). Major intervalley ridges include Drohobych Ridge, Middle Pricarpathian Ridge, Southern Pokuttia Ridge, Seret-Prut Ridge, and the Ridges of Bukovina. Among local lowlands there are Upper Dniester Depression, Kalush Depression, Stanislaviv Depression, Halych-Bukachivtsi Basin, Kolomyia-Chernivtsi Basin, Seret Basin.
