= Stanyslaviv Depression =

Land formation in Subcarpathia

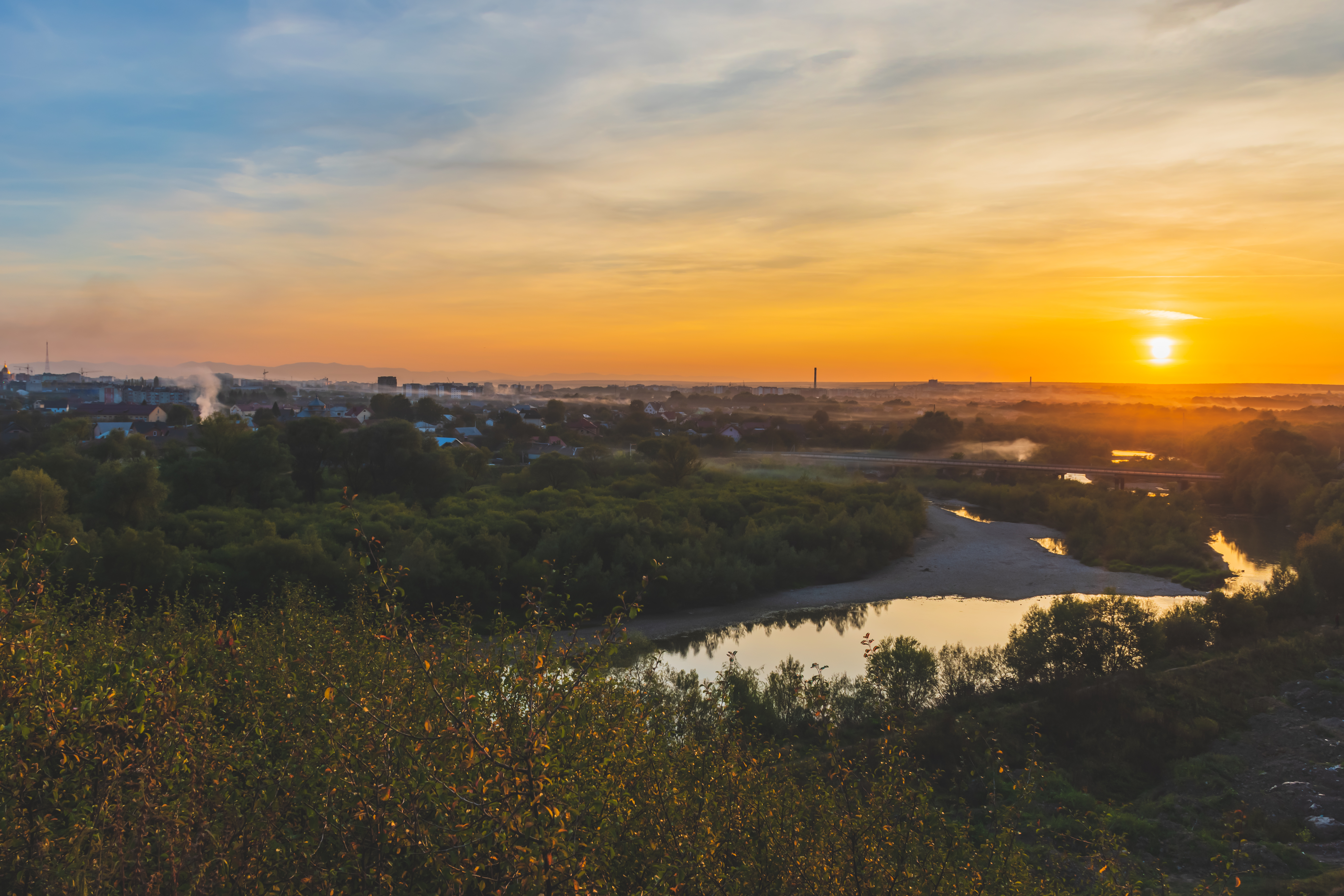
View of Bystrytsia-Nadvirnianska and Ivano-Frankivsk from the area of Vovchynets

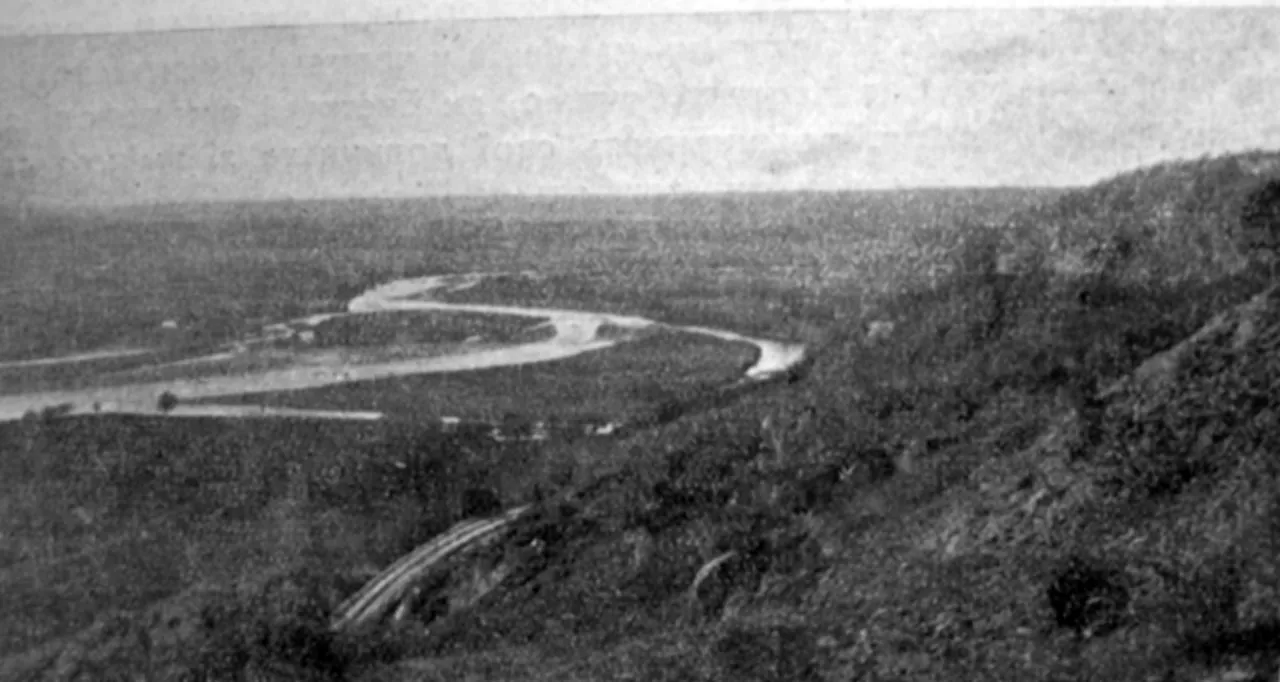
Stanislavivska Depression; view of Bystrytsia (mid 1930s)

Stanyslaviv Depression (Ukrainian: Станиславівська улоговина) is a land formation in Subcarpathia, located south of the city of Ivano-Frankivsk (formerly known as Stanyslaviv). With an area of over 600 sq. km, it lies between the river Bystrytsia Solotvynska in the northwest and Vorona river, which separates it from Pokutian Upland, in the southeast. The depression is a tectonic formation overlain with alluvial deposits. Its elevation rises from approsimately 250 meters in the north to 500 meters in the south. The Bystrytsia Nadvirnianska river runs through the depression.

The earths in the area are swampy and contain large amounts of sod gumbo, providing space for meadows. Over 60% of the territory in the depression is cultvated, with only around 5% being taken by forests. It has a big population density with over 280 inhabitants per square kilometer (110 not counting the city of Ivano-Frankivsk).
