= P21 (disambiguation) =

p21 is a cyclin-dependent kinase inhibitor.

P21 or P-21 may also refer to:

== Proteins ==
- p21/ras, part of the RAt Sarcoma family of proteins
- Transforming protein p21, encoded by the HRAS gene in humans

== Vessels ==
- ARA King (P-21), a minelayer and patrol ship of the Argentine Navy
- HMS Oberon (P21), a submarine of the Royal Navy
- LÉ Emer (P21), a patrol vessel of the Irish Navy
- Maltese patrol boat P21, of the Armed Forces of Malta

== Other uses ==
- Curtiss XP-21, an American experimental fighter aircraft
- P21 road (Ukraine)
- Papyrus 21, a biblical manuscript
- Yao language
- Partnership for 21st Century Skills; see 21st century skills
- Platform 21, stylised as p^{21}
- Prophet 21, Distribution Software for businesses published by Epicor
- P2_{1}, three-dimensional space group number 4
