= P24 =

P24 or P-24 may refer to:

== Aviation ==
- Fairey P.24 Monarch, a British aircraft engine
- Lockheed YP-24, an American prototype fighter aircraft
- PZL P.24, a Polish fighter aircraft

== Molecular biology ==
- P24 capsid protein, a protein of HIV
- P24 protein family, a group of transmembrane proteins
- Pseudomonas sRNA P24

== Other uses ==
- Maltese patrol boat P24, of the Armed Forces of Malta
- Ndonde language
- P24 road (Ukraine)
- Papyrus 24, a biblical manuscript
