= P21 road (Ukraine) =

Road in Ukraine

Road P21
- Автошлях Р21
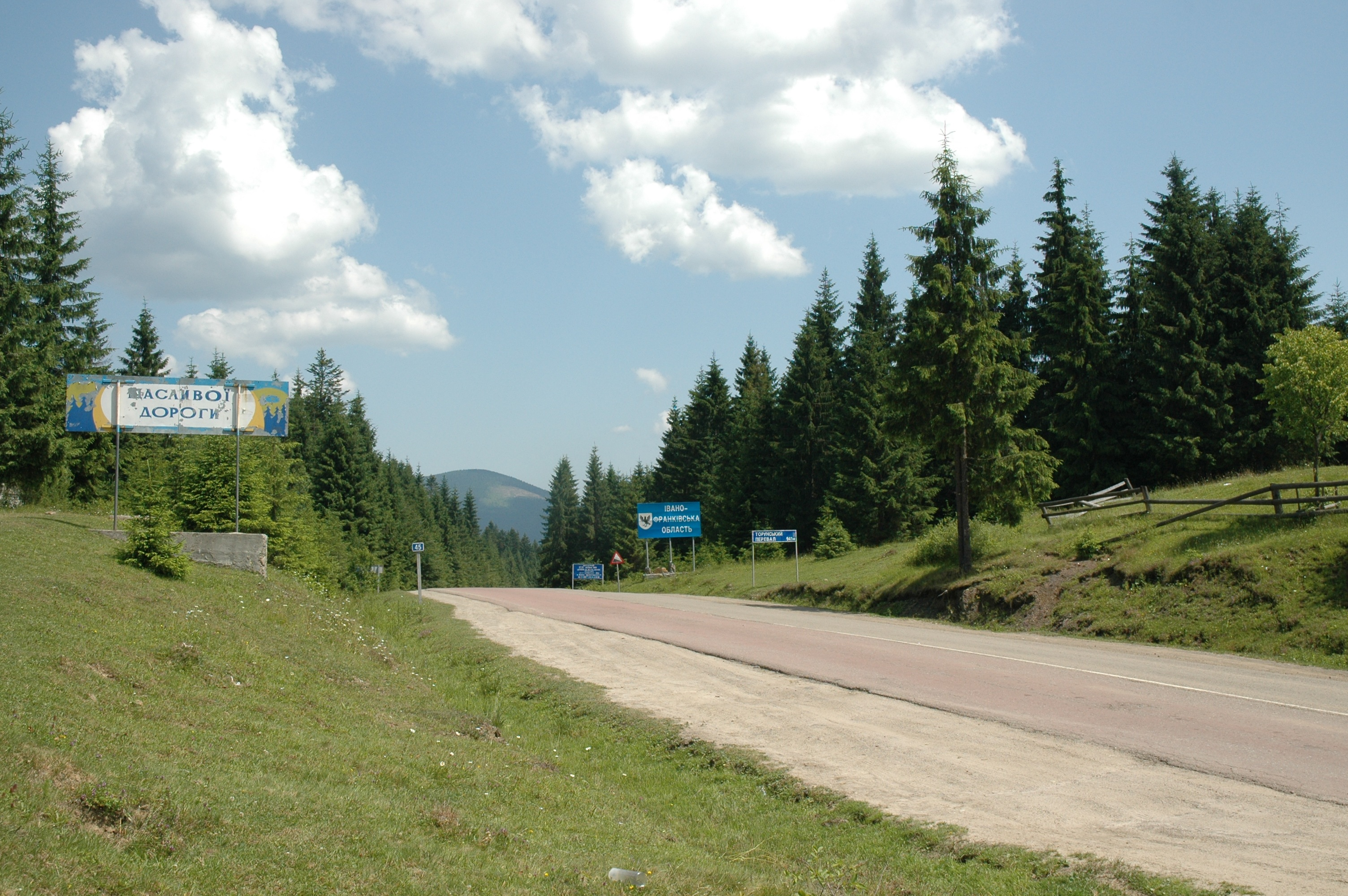

Route information
- Length: 128.8 km (80.0 mi)

Major junctions
- north end: H 10 in Dolyna
- south end: H 09 in Khust

Location
- Country: Ukraine
- Oblasts: Zakarpattia, Ivano-Frankivsk Oblast

Highway system
- Roads in Ukraine; State Highways
← P 20	→ P 22

P21 road is a regional road (P-Highway) in Zakarpattia Oblast and Ivano-Frankivsk, Ukraine. It runs north-south and connects cities of Dolyna and Khust.

== Main route ==
Main route and connections to/intersections with other highways in Ukraine.

Marker	Main settlements	Notes	Highway Interchanges
Ivano-Frankivsk Oblast
0 km	Dolyna		vulytsia Oblisky • H 10
		Torun pass	
	Soimy		T0718
	Mizhhiria		T0720
	Lypcha		T0721
128.8 km	Khust		Lvivska vulytsia • H 09

== See also ==
- Roads in Ukraine
