= Bystrytsia (Dniester) =

Bystrytsia Бистриця
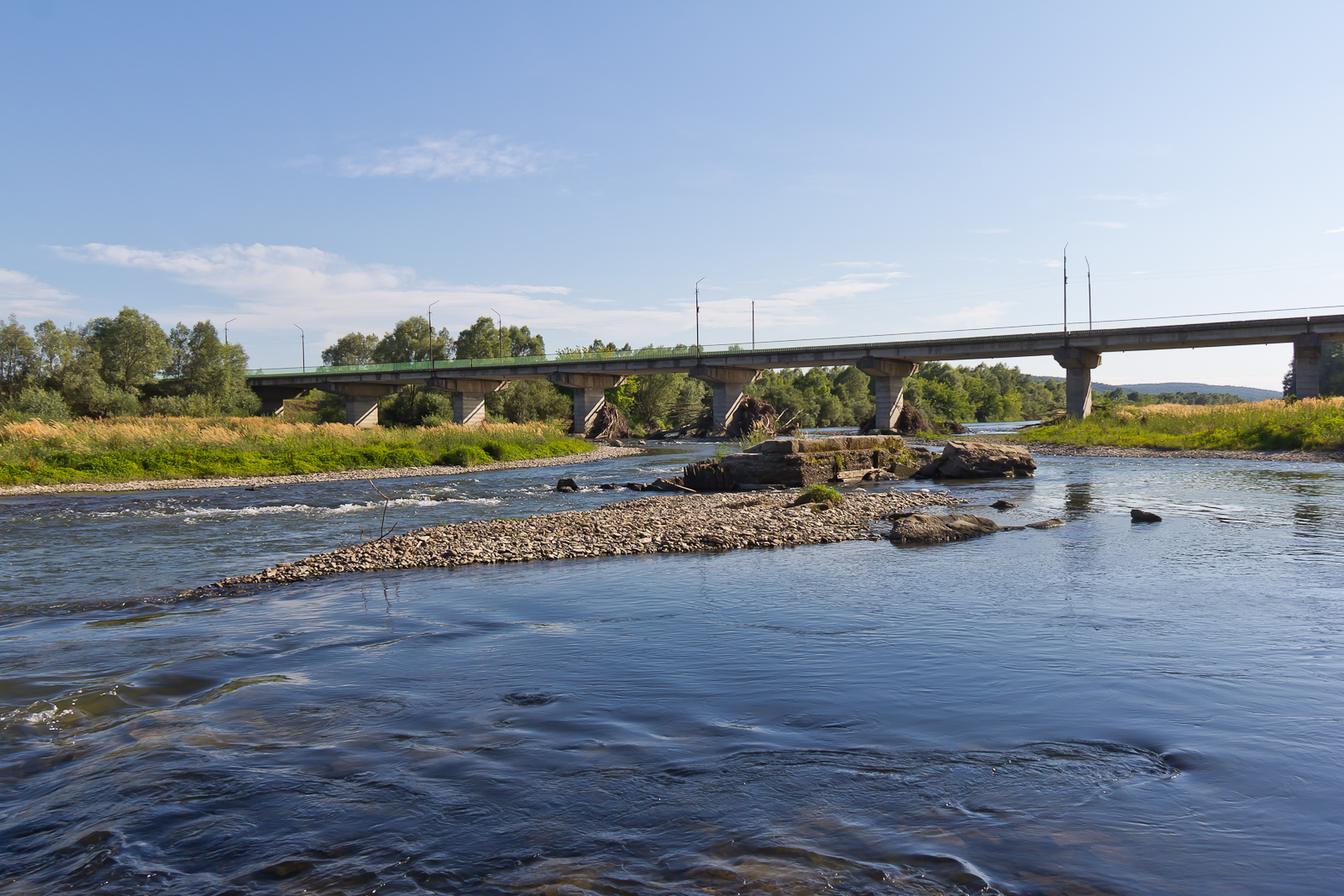
- Bystrytsia River near Yezupil

Location
- Country: Ukraine

Physical characteristics
- Source
  - location: confluence of Bystrytsia Solotvynska and Bystrytsia Nadvirnianska (near Vovchynets, Ivano-Frankivsk)
- Mouth: Dniester
  - location: Yezupil
  - coordinates: 49.0422°N 24.8119°E
- Length: 17 km (11 mi)
- Basin size: 2,520 km^{2} (970 sq mi)

Basin features
- Progression: Dniester→ Dniester Estuary→ Black Sea

The Bystrytsia (Ukrainian: Бистриця; Polish: Bystrzyca) is a river, a right tributary of the Dniester which flows through Ivano-Frankivsk Raion, Ivano-Frankivsk Oblast.

Bystrytsia river is formed by confluence of Bystrytsia Solotvynska and Bystrytsia Nadvirnianska.

== Formation and course ==
The Bystrytsia-Nadvirnyanska, a typical mountain river; in its lower course (Subcarpathia), a river of the plains, has a length of 94 km (58 mi) and a drainage basin of 1,580 km^{2} (610 sq mi), and the Bystrytsia-Solotvynska half has a length of 82 km (51 mi) and a drainage basin of 795 km^{2} (307 sq mi).

Both of the branches, typical mountain rivers, of the Bystrytsia river take their source in the Gorgany Mountains of the Carpathian mountain range in the Ukrainian Oblast of Ivano-Frankivsk. With the city of Ivano-Frankivsk, the administrative center of the Ivano-Frankivsk Oblast, the two branches merge, and then flow 17 km (11 mi) south of Halych near the town of Yezupil, where the river finally flows into the Dniester.

The name, Bystrytsia, comes from the Slavic word "бистрий" - bystry, which is translated as fast or fast moving.
