= Ivano-Frankivsk Oblast =

Region of Ukraine

Coordinates: 48°39′30″N 24°30′18″E

Ivano-Frankivsk Oblast Івано-Франківська область
- Oblast
- Ivano-Frankivska oblast
- Flag Coat of arms
- Nicknames: Івано-Франківщина (Ivano-Frankivshchyna), Франківщина (Frankivshchyna), Прикарпаття (Prykarpattia)
- Country: Ukraine
- Established: 4 December 1939
- Named for: Ivan Franko
- Administrative center: Ivano-Frankivsk
- Largest cities: Ivano-Frankivsk, Kalush, Kolomyia

Government
  - Governor: Svitlana Onyshchuk
  - Oblast council: 84 seats
  - Chairperson: Oleksandr Sych (Svoboda)

Area
  - Total: 13,900 km^{2} (5,400 sq mi)
  - Rank: Ranked 22nd

Population (2022)
  - Total: 1,351,822 ▼
  - Rank: Ranked 13th
  - Density: 97.3/km^{2} (252/sq mi)

GDP
  - Total: ₴ 120 billion (€3.1 billion)
  - Per capita: ₴ 88,227 (€2,300)
- Time zone: UTC+2 (EET)
  - Summer (DST): UTC+3 (EEST)
- Postal code: 76-78xxx
- Area code: +380-34
- ISO 3166 code: UA-26
- Vehicle registration: AT, KT
- Raions: 6
- Hromadas: 62
- HDI (2022): 0.722 high
- NUTS statistical regions of Ukraine: UA72
- Website: www.if.gov.ua www.rada.gov.ua

Ivano-Frankivsk Oblast (Ukrainian: Івано-Франківська область, romanized: Ivano-Frankivska oblast), also referred to as Ivano-Frankivshchyna (Івано-Франківщина) or simply Frankivshchyna, is an oblast (region) in western Ukraine. Its administrative center is the city of Ivano-Frankivsk. It has a population of 1,351,822 (2022 estimate).

The area, also known as Prykarpattia, was part of the historical region of Galicia, where the Kingdom of Galicia–Volhynia flourished. After World War I, the area became part of the Second Polish Republic and was administered as part of Stanisławów Voivodeship until the invasion of Poland. The area was annexed by the Soviet Union and was known as Stanislav Oblast until 1962, when its administrative center was renamed after the Ukrainian writer Ivan Franko. Kolomyia was a historical center of the oblast and remains a major cultural center of Pokuttia, the traditional name for the southern part of the oblast.

== Name ==
On November 9, 1962, a decree was issued by the Presidium of the Verkhovna Rada of the UkrSSR, according to which: "Taking into account the wishes of the labor collectives of the city and region, the Presidium of the Verkhovna Rada of the USSR decided to rename the city of Stanislav (Stanislaviv) to Ivano-Frankivsk, and the Stanislav Oblast to Ivano-Frankivsk Oblast." The renaming was timed to the 300th anniversary of the city's founding and in honor of the outstanding Ukrainian writer Ivan Franko.

As with the rest of Ukraine's oblasts Ivano-Frankivsk may also be known by its matronymical name Ivano-Frankivshchyna (Ukrainian: Івано-Франківщина). However, that name did not receive general public acceptance and commonly Ivano-Frankivsk Oblast is almost always called Prykarpattia (en. Prekarpathians) – a historic name for the same region. (Geographically the historic region covers a much larger portion of Ukraine than just the Ivano-Frankivsk region.) Formerly as Stanislavshchyna or Stanyslavivshchyna – Ukrainian: Станіславщина, Станиславівщина.

== Geography ==
Ivano-Frankivsk Oblast borders Lviv Oblast to its north and west, Zakarpattia Oblast to its south-west, has a 50-km long state border with Romania (Maramureș County) to its immediate south, and it borders Chernivtsi Oblast to the south-east and Ternopil Oblast to the east. It is situated partly in the Eastern European Plain and partly Carpathian Foothills. The oblast may be divided into three regions: mountainous, pre-mountainous, and plains.

The climate is mildly-continental and damp with cool summers and mild winters. The average monthly temperature in June is 18 °C (64 °F) with 12 to 16 °C (54 to 61 °F) in the mountains. The average monthly temperature in January is −4 °C (25 °F) with −6 °C (21 °F) in the mountains. Average precipitation varies annually around 650 mm (25.6 in) with 1,550 mm (61 in) in the mountains.

=== Relief ===
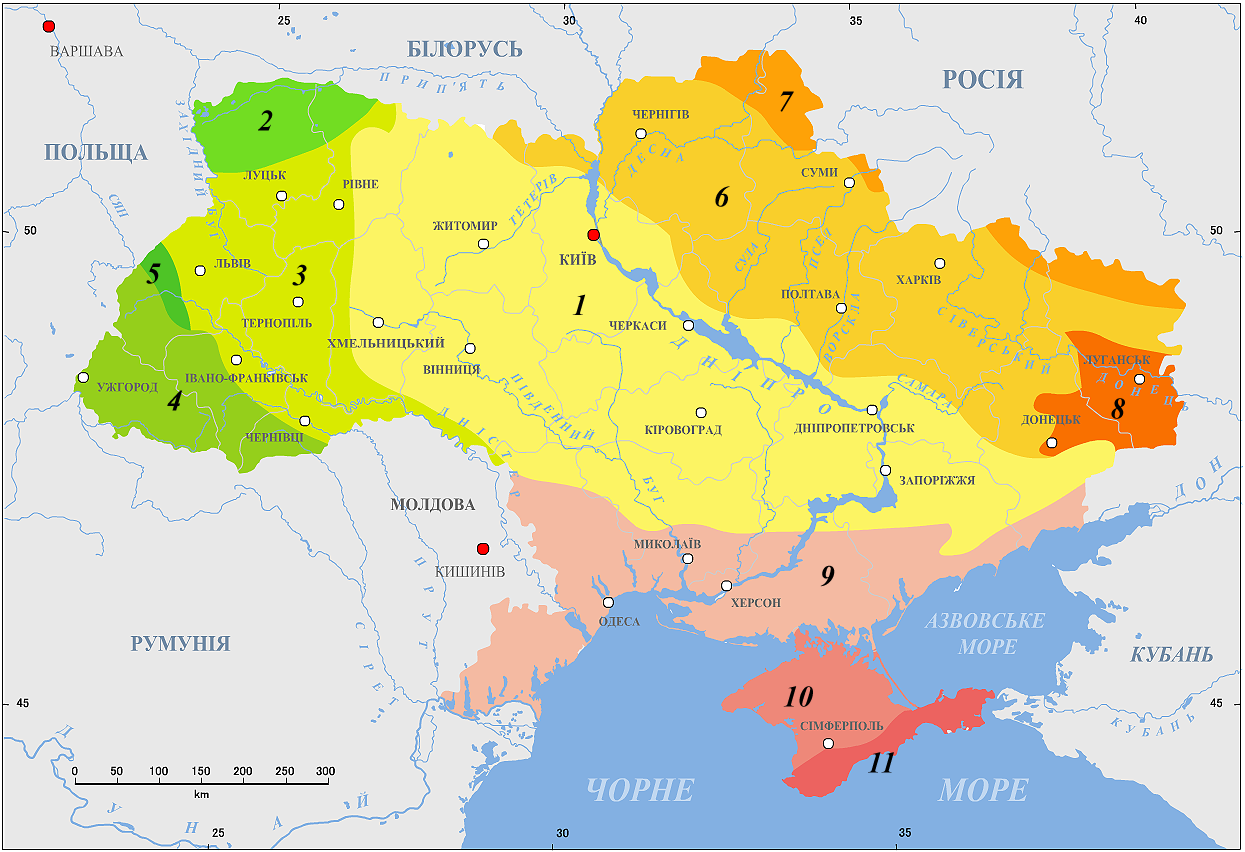
Geology of Ukraine

The region is situated between two main regional tectonic plates: Carpathian fold belt and Volhynia-Podillya plate. The most prominent features of the first one are the Carpathian Mountains, while the second one - Dniester river.

The Carpathian Mountains contribute tremendously to the change in relief of Ivano-Frankivsk Oblast and their elevation rises from north-east to south-west stretching along the oblast's south-western border. The elevation of the oblast varies from 230 m (755 ft) to 2,061 m (6,762 ft) above sea level. The mountains occupy almost one half of the whole Oblast and consist of two main mountain ranges: the Gorgany (highest peak – Mt. Syvulia Major (1,836 m / 6024 ft)) and the Chornohora range (highest peak – Mt. Hoverla (2,061 m / 6,762 ft).

The rest of Ivano-Frankivsk Oblast is located within the Dniester river and Prut river valleys. The plains of the oblast are part of the Carpathian Foothills and Opillia Upland (part of Podillia Upland) which are cut through by Dniester. The upland has a temperate-climate habitat mixed with grassland and woodland – also known as the forest steppe. The relief of the region consists mostly of rolling hills of 230–400 m (755–1312 ft) over the sea level. Near river valleys are common canyons and ravines.

A particular feature of the southern region of the Ivano-Frankivsk Oblast is Stanislav Canyon, in the so-called Kherson Mountains, a deep cut in the local topography where episodic water flowing into the Baltic has steeply eroded a canyon formation.

The Dniester flows mainly through the Halych Raion and along the administrative border between Ivano-Frankivsk and Ternopil Oblasts. The territory of the region within immediate proximity to the river is traditionally known as Opillia. Opillia, however, stretches far beyond the oblast and only covers two of its raions: Halych Raion and Rohatyn Raion, both located in the north. Relief in the area consists of rolling hills uplands.

The Carpathian foothills consist mostly of low denudation accumulative uplands, while the right bank of Dniester along the border with the Ternopil Oblast depicts karst type relief of Pokuttia Upland. Because of it near that area along Dniester relief shows forms of canyon. Pokuttia Upland between Bystrytsia of Nadvirna and Prut River (Prut-Bystrytsia Upland) serves as drainage divide within the oblast between Dniester and Prut. Carpathian foothills have two depressions: one is at the confluence of Bystrytsia Solotvynska, Bystrytsia Nadvirnianska, Vorona and Bystrytsia rivers, called Bystrytsia Depression, and another is around the city of Kalush, called Kalush Depression.

=== Hydrology ===
Ivano-Frankivsk Oblast has a plethora of rivers, waterfalls, mountainous brooks, and smaller ponds, but there is almost no other type of bodies of water such as lakes and water reservoirs. Most of rivers either flow into Dniester or Prut River (tributary of Danube). The total water drainage area of the region is 13,900 km^{2} (5,400 sq mi). Segments of Dniester and Cheremosh River are used as administrative borders with Ternopil and Chernivtsi oblasts respectfully.

The water drainage divide between Dniester and Prut cuts the region through middle of following districts: Nadvirna Raion, Kolomyia Raion, Tlumach Raion, and Horodenka Raion.

=== Nature Reserves ===
The region is a home to some 456 preserved areas (as of June 1, 2006) of some 195,633 ha (483,420 acres), 30 out of which are of all-national importance with an area of 108,742 ha (268,710 acres) and the rest of a local importance. In the Ivano-Frankivsk Oblast is located a strict nature reserve Gorgany that was created in 1996. There are five national parks in the region. There are numerous natural monuments of feature and habitat management areas (zakaznyks).

Park	Raion
Carpathian National Nature Park	Verkhovyna / Nadvirna
Hutsulshchyna National Nature Park	Verkhovyna
Halych National Nature Park	Ivano-Frankivsk
Verkhovyna National Nature Park	Verkhovyna
Syniohora National Nature Park	Ivano-Frankivsk

Nature Reserve	Raion
Nature Preserve Gorgany	Nadvirna

== Government ==
The government in the region is headed by the chairman of the regional state administration (for simplicity sake - governor) appointed by the President of Ukraine. The governor appoints his deputies forming his regional governing cabinet to supervise the government policies in the region. Aside of the state administration the region has its own council that is headed by its chairman. The composition of the council depends on the popular vote in the region, while the chairman is elected within the elected council.

Regional State Administration

Regional State Administration consists of the chairman and his deputies (5) supported by the "aparat" of the administration. Within the administration are numerous departments, each of them headed by a chief of department. The Ivano-Frankivsk Region State Administration has 17 departments and other government institutions such as the Children Service, regional state archives, and others.

- Office of State Administration
- Chief Department of Economy
- Chief Financial Department
- Chief Department industry and infrastructure development
- Chief Department of tourism, Euro-integration, foreign relations, and investments
- Chief Department of legal and interior policies
- Chief Department of family, youth, and sports
- Chief Department of labor and social security
- Department of culture
- Chief Department of agro-industrial development
- Chief Department of regional development and construction
- Department of communal management
- Department of urban development and architecture
- Chief Department of Education and Science
- Chief Department of Health Security
- Department of Extraordinary Situation and Protection of Population from Consequences of the Chornobyl Catastrophe
- Media Department
- Department of resources and management support
- Children Service
- Inspection of the State Technical Supervision
- Inspection of quality and formation of resources of agricultural products
- State Archives of the Region
- Ivano-Frankivsk regional center for preparation and improving the qualification of workers of bodies of state power, bodies of local self-governing, state enterprises, institutions, and organizations

Regional council

Seats and percentage
Svoboda (17)	14.90%
Fatherland (16)	14.00%
Our Ukraine (15)	13.20%
Front of Changes (13)	11.40%
Party of Regions (11)	9.60%
Ukrainian Party (11)	9.60%
People's Party (9)	7.90%
Revival (5)	4.40%
Ukrainian People's Party (5)	4.40%
Cathedral (4)	3.50%
RUKh (3)	2.60%
UDAR (2)	1.80%
For Ukraine! (1)	0.90%

- Chairman: Oleksandr Sych (Svoboda)

== Regional subdivisions ==
Since July 2020, Ivano-Frankivsk Oblast is administratively subdivided into six districts (raions).

Flag	Coat of arms	Name	Ukrainian Name	Administrative center	Area (km^{2})	Population estimate 2021
		Ivano-Frankivsk Raion	Івано-Франківський район	Ivano-Frankivsk	3,913	556,104
Kalush raion		Kalush Raion	Калуський район	Kalush	3,546.8	279,867
		Kolomyia Raion	Коломийський район	Kolomyia	2,484.5	272,628
		Kosiv Raion	Косівський район	Kosiv	853.7	83,700
		Nadvirna Raion	Надвірнянський район	Nadvirna	1,872	129,928
—		Verkhovyna Raion	Верховинський район	Verkhovyna	1,271.7	30,195
		Ivano-Frankivsk Oblast	Івано-Франківська область	Ivano-Frankivsk	13,900	1,351,822

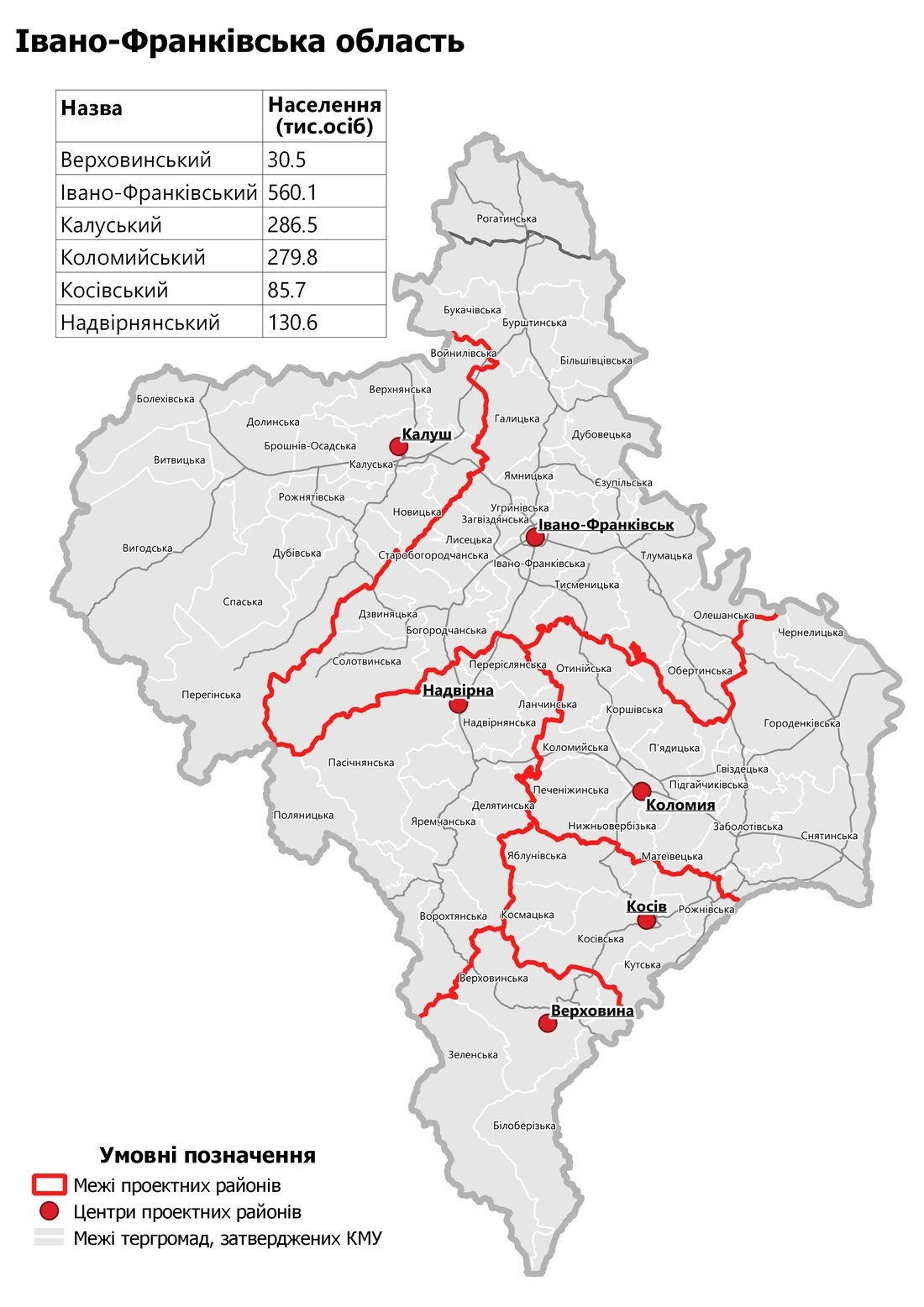
Map of Ivano-Frankivsk Oblast.

=== Primary divisions (pre-reform) ===
The Ivano-Frankivsk Oblast was administratively subdivided into 14 districts (raions) as well as 6 cities (municipalities) which represented a separate raion and in direct subordination to the regional government, among which are Bolekhiv, Kalush, Kolomyia, Yaremche, and the administrative center of the region, Ivano-Frankivsk. Burshtyn became the 6th city of regional importance in 2014. The formation of the region was established in 1921 in the Second Polish Republic and was in majority preserved during the Soviet times. Most of the districts (former powiats) were reestablished as well in 1960s. The major industrial and cultural centers of the region were given a wider form of autonomy and assigned as the cities of regional subordination.

Raions of the Ivano-Frankivsk Oblast
No.	Name	Created	Arms	Administrative center	Area (km^{2} / sq mi)	Population (2001)
1	Bohorodchany Raion	January 1, 1947		Bohorodchany (Urban-type settlement)	799 km^{2} (308 sq mi)	70,212
2	Verkhovyna Raion	December 8, 1966		Verkhovyna (Urban-type settlement)	1,254 km^{2} (484 sq mi)	30,079
3	Halych Raion	January 1, 1947		Halych (City)	723 km^{2} (279 sq mi)	65,640
4	Horodenka Raion	January 1, 1947		Horodenka (City)	747 km^{2} (288 sq mi)	60,881
5	Dolyna Raion	January 1, 1947		Dolyna (City)	1,248 km^{2} (482 sq mi)	71,059
6	Kalush Raion	January 1, 1947		Kalush (City)	647 km^{2} (250 sq mi)	62,883
7	Kolomyia Raion	January 1, 1947		Kolomyia (City)	1,026 km^{2} (396 sq mi)	105,940
8	Kosiv Raion	January 1, 1947		Kosiv (City)	903 km^{2} (349 sq mi)	90,167
9	Nadvirna Raion	January 4, 1965		Nadvirna (City)	1,294 km^{2} (500 sq mi)	113,508
10	Rohatyn Raion	January 4, 1965		Rohatyn (City)	815 km^{2} (315 sq mi)	51,125
11	Rozhniativ Raion	January 4, 1965		Rozhniativ (Urban-type settlement)	1,303 km^{2} (503 sq mi)	75,598
12	Sniatyn Raion	January 4, 1965		Sniatyn (City)	602 km^{2} (232 sq mi)	68,971
13	Tysmenytsia Raion	December 8, 1966		Tysmenytsia (City)	736 km^{2} (284 sq mi)	85,400
14	Tlumach Raion	January 4, 1965		Tlumach (City)	684 km^{2} (264 sq mi)	52,835
				Average	912.9 km^{2} (352.5 sq mi)	71,735.6
Main city municipalities of the Ivano-Frankivsk Region
a	Bolekhiv	October 21, 1993		Bolekhiv (City)	300 km^{2} (120 sq mi)	21,232
b	Ivano-Frankivsk	October 28, 1963		Ivano-Frankivsk (City)	84 km^{2} (32 sq mi)	230,443
c	Kalush	March 20, 1972		Kalush (City)	65 km^{2} (25 sq mi)	67,887
d	Kolomyia	October 28, 1963		Kolomyia (City)	41 km^{2} (16 sq mi)	61,448
e	Yaremche	December 30, 1977		Yaremche (City)	657 km^{2} (254 sq mi)	20,821
f	Burshtyn	March 11, 2014		Burshtyn (City)	657 km^{2} (254 sq mi)	20,821
				Total	1,147 km^{2} (443 sq mi)	401,831 (27.6%)

=== Secondary divisions ===
==== City municipalities (councils)/mayors ====
The oblast has 15 cities which are (alphabetical order): Bolekhiv, Burshtyn, Dolyna, Halych, Horodenka, Ivano-Frankivsk, Kalush, Kolomyia, Kosiv, Nadvirna, Rohatyn, Sniatyn, Tlumach, Tysmenytsia, and Yaremche. Five of those cities are of regional importance and the other ten are of district importance. All cities have its own council and mayor that represent a local form of self-government allowed by the laws on local administration and the Constitution of Ukraine. City municipalities of the region are independent from any district administration.

==== Town municipalities (councils) ====
Within the region there are 24 urbanized settlements (towns) which are a special settlement classification inherited from the Soviet municipal organization. Three of those towns serve as administrative centers of their respective districts. Each town has its own council that along with surrounding village councils compose a district administration which has its own executive branch, District State Administration, appointed by the President of Ukraine. Towns do not have a mayoral office and their head of the council serves as the main representative of the whole settlement.

==== Village municipalities (councils) ====
All other settlements in the region are considered rural and accounted for some 765 localities including villages and 20 selyshches (smaller villages) which are administered by 477 village councils. Some village municipalities consist of several villages, while others are a single-village municipality. There are several villages that are part of city municipalities such as Ivano-Frankivsk, Bolekhiv, and Yaremcha, while all others are spread out across the districts of the region.

=== Historical overview of subdivisions ===
When on November 27, 1939, the Soviet regime was established in Stanisławów Voivodeship, the Polish administrative division of it was kept almost the same until January 17, 1940. Only two powiats Stryj and Żydaczów were transferred away.

On December 4, 1939, the voivodeship was officially renamed into Stanislav Oblast. In 1940 the oblast was redivided into 37 raions and two municipalities (cities of oblast subordination). The administrative centers of the former raions were following settlements: Bohorodchany (town), Bolekhiv (city), Bilshivtsi (town), Bukachivtsi (village), Burshtyn (town), Voinylov (village), Vyhoda (village), Halych (town), Hvizdets (town), Horodenka (town), Delyatyn (town), Dolyna (city), Zhabie (village), Zhovten (town), Zabolotiv (town), Kalush (city), Kolomyia (city), Korshiv (village), Kosiv (city), Kuty (town), Lanchyn (town), Lysets (town), Nadvirna (city), Novytsia (village), Obertyn (town), Otynia (town), Pechenizhyn (town), Rohatyn (city), Rozhniativ (town), Sniatyn (city), Solotvyn (town), Stanislav (city), Tlumach (city), Tysmenytsia (town), Chernelytsia (town), Yabluniv (town), Yaremcha (village). Two municipalities were cities of Stanislav and Kolomyia. On November 11, 1940, Deliatyn Raion was liquidated. On November 16, 1940, Novytsia Raion was re-administrated under town of Perehinske.

During the World War II the region was occupied by the Nazi Germany (see Operation Barbarossa). Along with Lviv, Drohobych and Tarnopil oblasts, it was reorganized on August 1, 1941, into Distrikt Galizien centered in Lemberg and annexed to the General Government. The area of the former Stanislav Oblast was divided into three kreis (counties): Kalusz, Stanislau, and Kolomea. On July 27, 1944, the region was liberated from the Nazi Germany by the Soviet Army (see Lvov–Sandomierz Offensive).

The administrative division of Stanislav Oblast was reinstated and confirmed on January 1, 1947, with the same 36 raions and two municipalities as their existed before the war. Several settlements, however, had their status elevated. The status of a town obtained Bukachivtsi, Vyhoda, and Yaremcha, while Halych and Horodenka became recognized as cities. The next major changes in the region took place in the late 1950s. In 1957 five raions were liquidated: Vyhoda, Zhovten, Kuty, Pechenizhyn, and Chernelytsia. Then another five were liquidated in 1959: Bukachivtsi, Korshiv, Perehinske, Solotvyn, and Stanislav. On December 30, 1962, within the oblast was created the Verkhovyna Industrial Raion, centered in a town of Verkhovyna.

On October 28, 1963, another major change took place when raions of the oblast were re-administered into the six rural raions, one – industrial, and two municipalities. There were the following administrative centers: Bohorodchany, Halych, Horodenka, Kalush, Kolomyia, Kosiv, Dolyna (municipalities – Ivano-Frankivsk (new name) and Kolomyia). On January 4, 1965, Dolyna Industrial Raion Raion was redesigned into the regular raion, while five other previous raions were recreated: Nadvirna, Rohatyn, Rozhniativ, Sniatyn, and Tlumach. On December 8, 1966, there were created Verkhovyna and Ivano-Frankivsk raions. That was the last major re-administration of the oblast.

On March 20, 1972, in the city of Kalush was created a municipality and it became a city of oblast subordination. On December 30, 1977, the same thing happened to Yaremcha status of which was elevated as well. On March 28, 1982, the Ivano-Frankivsk Raion was re-administrated under the Tysmenytsia Raion. On October 21, 1993, the city of Bolekhiv became of an oblast subordination with its own municipality. On December 14, 2006, Yaremcha was renamed into Yaremche.

== Demographics ==
Year	Population (in thousands)
2001	1,406.1
2011	1,379.6
Regional Administration of Statistics

According to the 2001 Ukrainian census, ethnic Ukrainians accounted for 97.5% of the population of Ivano-Frankivsk Oblast, and ethnic Russians for 1.8%.

Largest settlements in the region
#	City	Population
1	Ivano-Frankivsk	215,288 (2001)
2	Kalush	67,887 (2001)
3	Kolomyia	61,448 (2001)
4	Dolyna	20,696 (2001)
5	Nadvirna	20,620 (2001)
6	Burshtyn	15,182 (2001)
7	Perehinske	12,272 (2001)
8	Bolekhiv	10,590 (2001)
9	Sniatyn	10,210 (2001)

=== Language ===
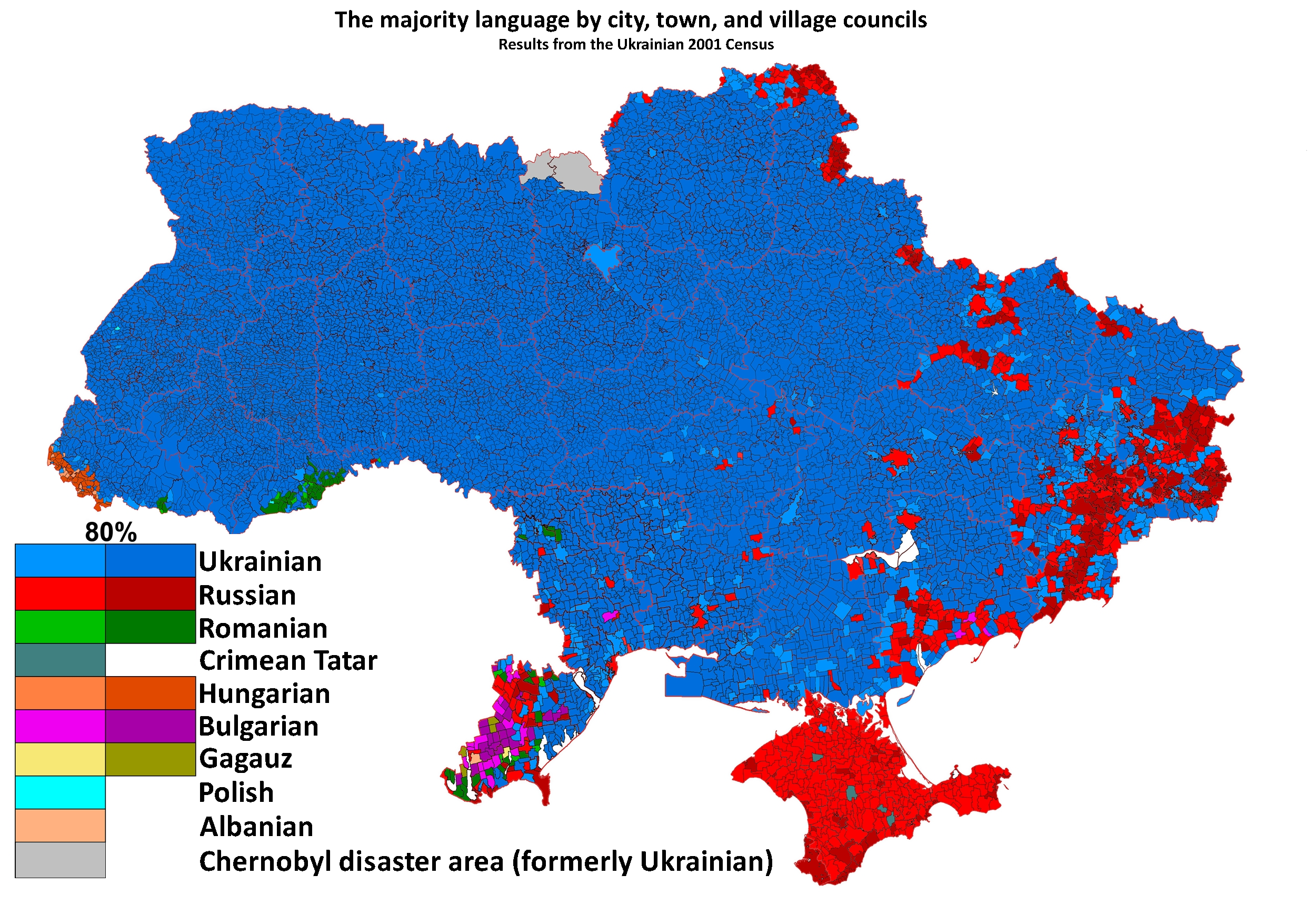
According to the 2001 Ukrainian census, Ukrainian was the native language for over 97% of Ivano-Frankivsk Oblast's population: it was the dominant language in all of the city, town, and village councils of the oblast.

The Russification of Ukraine carried out during the Soviet era had little to no effect on the Ivano-Frankivsk Oblast: the share of Ukrainian-speakers in the region in 1959—1989 fluctuated around 94—96%. Native language of the population of Ivano-Frankivsk Oblast according to the results of population censuses:

	1959	1970	1989	2001
Ukrainian	94.4%	95.1%	94.9%	97.8%
Russian	4.2%	4.5%	4.8%	1.8%
Other	1.4%	0.4%	0.3%	0.2%

Native language of the population of the raions, cities, and city councils of Ivano-Frankivsk Oblast according to the 2001 Ukrainian census:

	Ukrainian	Russian
Ivano-Frankivsk Oblast	97.8%	1.8%
Ivano-Frankivsk (city council)	92.7%	6.4%
Bolekhiv (city council)	99.1%	0.7%
City of Kalush	95.3%	3.2%
City of Kolomyia	93.1%	5.0%
Yaremche (city council)	99.2%	0.6%
Bohorodchany Raion	99.6%	0.3%
Verkhovyna Raion (in pre-2020 borders)	99.6%	0.3%
Halych Raion	99.0%	0.9%
Horodenka Raion	99.6%	0.3%
Dolyna Raion	98.7%	1.0%
Kalush Raion (in pre-2020 borders)	99.7%	0.3%
Kolomyia Raion (in pre-2020 borders)	99.5%	0.4%
Kosiv Raion (in pre-2020 borders)	99.5%	0.4%
Nadvirna Raion (in pre-2020 borders)	98.8%	0.8%
Rohatyn Raion	99.7%	0.3%
Rozhniativ Raion	99.6%	0.3%
Sniatyn Raion	99.5%	0.4%
Tlumach Raion	99.7%	0.3%
Tysmenytsia Raion	99.5%	0.4%

Ukrainian is the only official language on the whole territory of Ivano-Frankivsk Oblast.

On 7 December 2018, a moratorium on the public use of Russian-language cultural products was imposed in Ivano-Frankivsk Oblast by a decision of the Ivano-Frankivsk Oblast Council.

According to a poll conducted by Rating from 16 November to 10 December 2018 as part of the project «Portraits of Regions», 94% of the residents of Ivano-Frankivsk Oblast believed that the Ukrainian language should be the only state language on the entire territory of Ukraine. 4% believed that Ukrainian should be the only state language, while Russian should be the second official language in some regions of the country. 1% believed that Russian should become the second state language of the country. 1% found it difficult to answer.

On 16 February 2024, Ivano-Frankivsk Oblast Council approved the «Regional complex programme "Strengthening the functioning of the Ukrainian language as the state language in all spheres of public life in Ivano-Frankivsk Oblast" for 2024—2026», the main objectives of which are to strengthen the positions of the Ukrainian language in various spheres of public life in the oblast and to Ukrainianize the refugees from other regions of Ukraine.

According to the research of the Content Analysis Centre, conducted from 15 August to 15 September 2024, the topic of which was the ratio of Ukrainian and Russian languages in the Ukrainian segment of social media, 96.2% of posts from Ivano-Frankivsk Oblast were written in Ukrainian (86.1% in 2023, 87.2% in 2022, 58.1% in 2020), while 3.8% were written in Russian (13.9% in 2023, 12.8% in 2022, 41.9% in 2020).

After Ukraine declared independence in 1991, Ivano-Frankivsk Oblast, as well as Ukraine as a whole, experienced a gradual Ukrainization of the education system, which had been Russified during the Soviet era. Dynamics of the ratio of the languages of instruction in general secondary education institutions in Ivano-Frankivsk Oblast:

Language of instruction, % of pupils	1991— 1992	1992— 1993	1993— 1994	1994— 1995	1995— 1996	2000— 2001	2005— 2006	2007— 2008	2010— 2011	2012— 2013	2015— 2016	2018— 2019	2021— 2022	2022— 2023
Ukrainian	96.0%	96.7%	97.0%	97.7%	98.0%	99.0%	99.7%	99.6%	99.6%	99.5%	99.4%	99.4%	100.0%	100.0%
Russian	4.0%	3.3%	3.0%	2.3%	2.0%	1.0%	0.2%	0.3%	0.3%	0.3%	0.3%	0.3%	—	—

According to the State Statistics Service of Ukraine, in the 2023—2024 school year, all 157,424 pupils in general secondary education institutions in Ivano-Frankivsk Oblast were studying in classes where Ukrainian was the language of instruction.

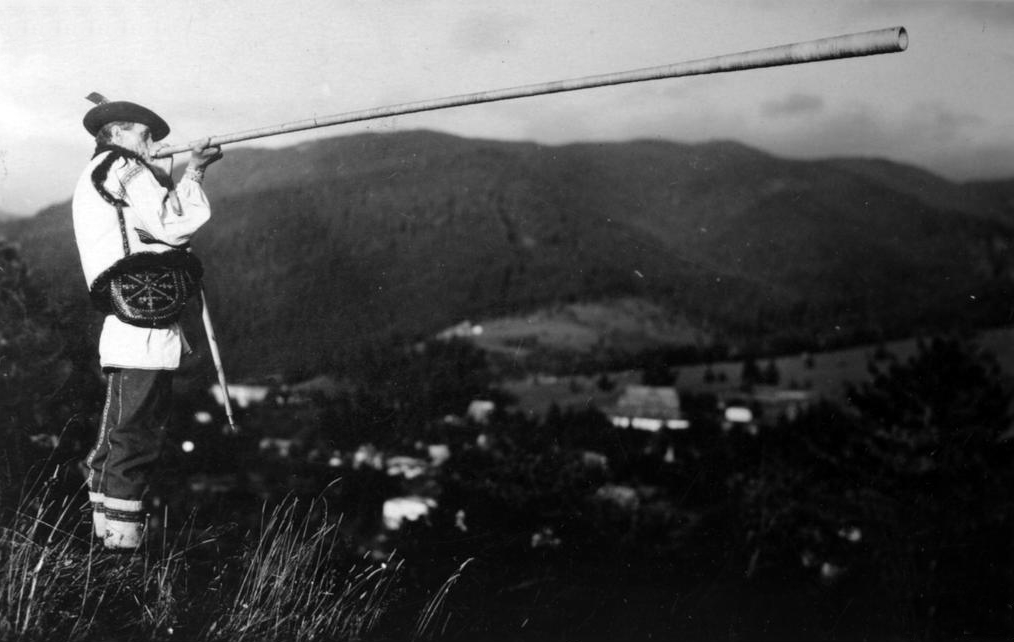
Hutsul plays trembita trumpet

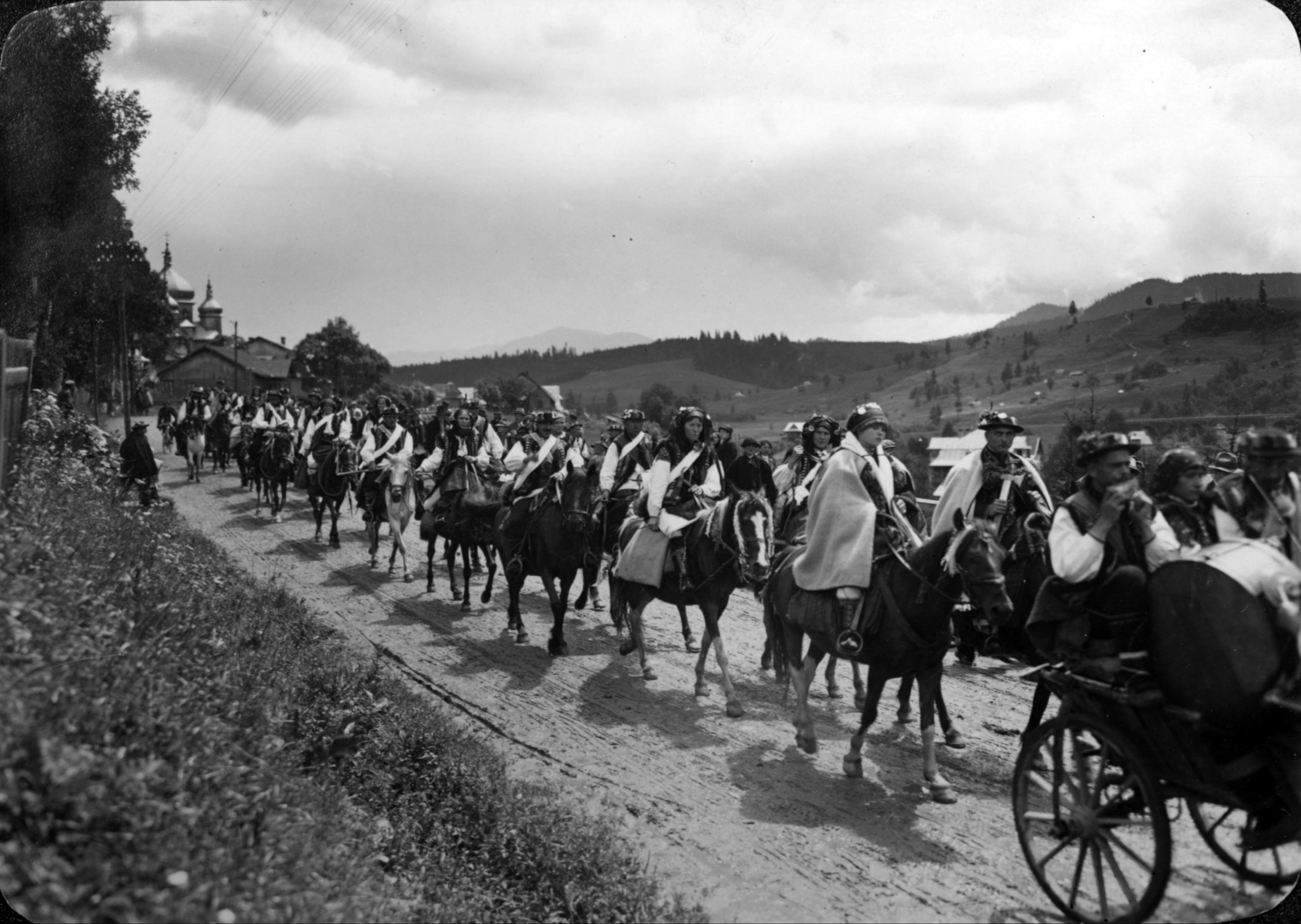
Hutsuls in traditional dress in wedding ceremony in Vorokhta

=== Religion ===
Religion in Ivano-Frankivsk Oblast (2015)
1. Eastern Catholicism (57.0%)
2. Eastern Orthodoxy (35.0%)
3. Unaffiliated Christian (6.00%)
4. Roman Catholicism (1.00%)
5. Protestantism (1.00%)

The dominant religion in Ivano-Frankvisk Oblast is Ukrainian Greek Catholic Church, professed by 57% of the population. Another 35% is Eastern Orthodox and 6% are unaffiliated generic Christians. Adherents of Roman Catholic Church and Protestantism make up 1% of the population respectively.

=== Age structure ===
0-14 years: 16.7% (male 118,518/female 112,130)
15-64 years: 69.5% (male 468,589/female 489,596)
65 years and over: 13.8% (male 63,324/female 126,635) (2013 official)

=== Median age ===
total: 37.3 years ▲
male: 34.7 years ▲
female: 40.0 years ▲ (2013 official)

== Culture and tourism ==
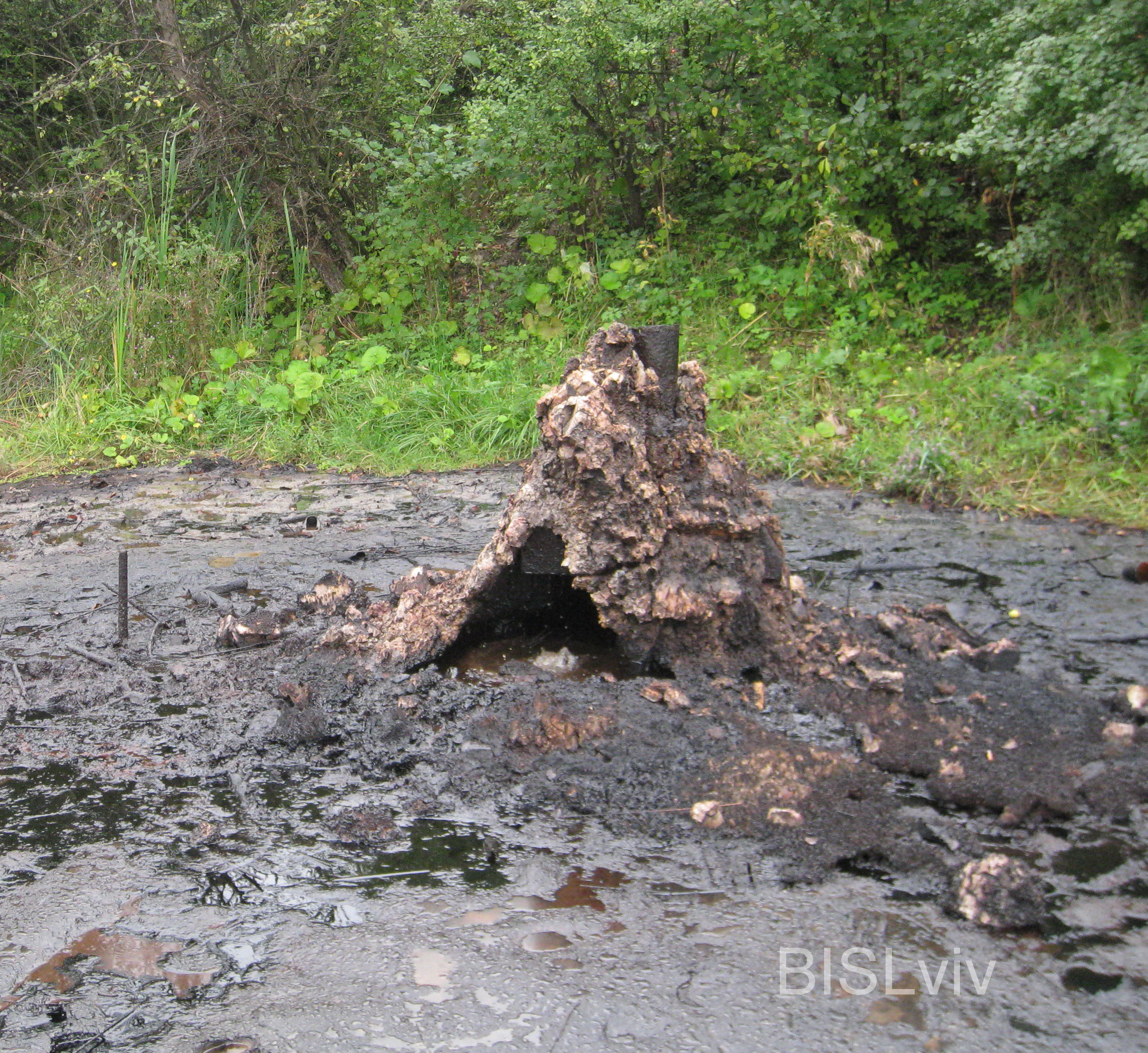
Mud volcano in Starunia

Ivano-Frankivsk Oblast is home of numerous cultural festivals. There are numerous natural and architectural benchmarks that are scattered throughout the region.

One of the famous festivals is the Ukrainian International festival of ethnic music and land art "Sheshory" that usually takes place in the picturesque Hutsul village of the Kosiv Raion Sheshory since 2003. From 2007, however the festival has spread throughout the country taking place in Podolia, Kyiv Oblast, and other places. In August 2010 the village of Spas in the Kolomyia Raion hosted a culinary event Smachny Spas in association with "Sheshory", while in July of the same year another eco-cultural event Trypilske kolo in the Rzhyschiv city of Kyiv region.

The city of Ivano-Frankivsk hosts several other festivals such as the All-Ukrainian festival of art collectives "Carpathian Spring" that takes place every May. Every two year the festival of modern art "Impreza" takes place every other year. Every odd year the city hosts the festival national-patriotic music and poetry "Freedom". Since May 2001 every year the city of Ivano-Frankivsk is the capital of the European blacksmith movement hosting the "Festival of blacksmith" and the art exhibition "Ornamental Forging" that takes place at the Mickewicz Square and neighboring Andrii Sheptytsky Square in city's old town.

On the territory of Ivano-Frankivsk Oblast are located numerous monuments of architectural heritage. On February 8, 1994, near the city of Halych was established the National preserve of Ancient Halych. Among other important sites in the region is the Church of the Holy Spirit located in the city of Rohatyn as well as the Maniava Skete. Near the village of Maniava in Ivano-Frankivsk Raion. The oblast also accounts for some number of various wooden churches of Boykos and Hutsuls traditional architecture.

In the Kalush Raion (western part of the region) visitors can find the Carpathian Train that still uses a narrow-gauge railway system. Train is used for its direct purpose transporting wood as well as for a tourist recreation. The biggest benchmark of the region is the Hoverla mountain, the tallest in the nation. However, due to increased touristic activities in the post-Soviet times the mountain is a subject to a high degree of pollution. No less interesting destination serve the Dovbush rocks that are located near the city of Bolekhiv in mountains. That location was a base of an anti-Polish Peasant movement. Near the Maniava Skete is located the highest waterfall in Ukraine, the Maniava waterfall (20 m). In the same Bohorodchany Raion visitors may find the local mud volcano located near the village of Starunia. It was noticed for the first time in 1977 after an earthquake that took place in Romania.

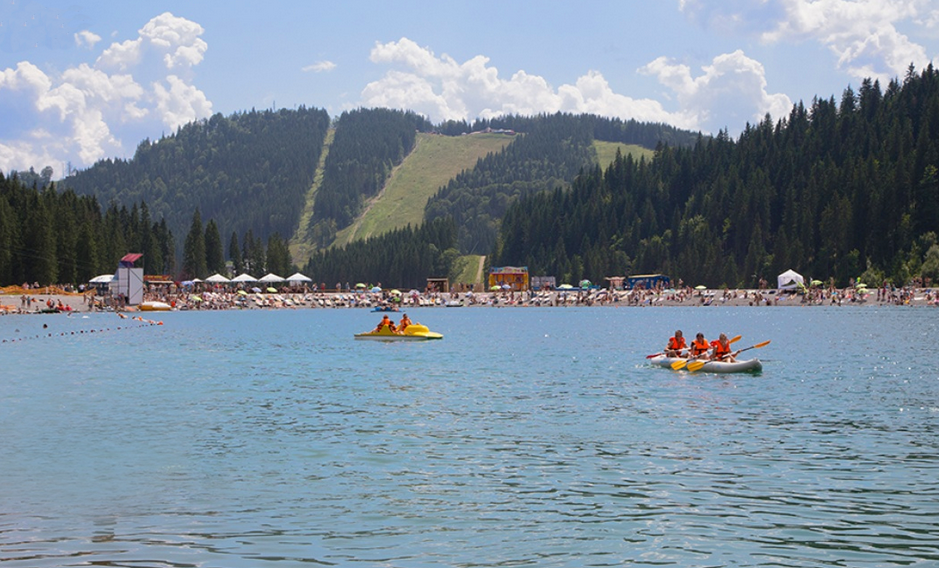
Bukovel Grand Lake

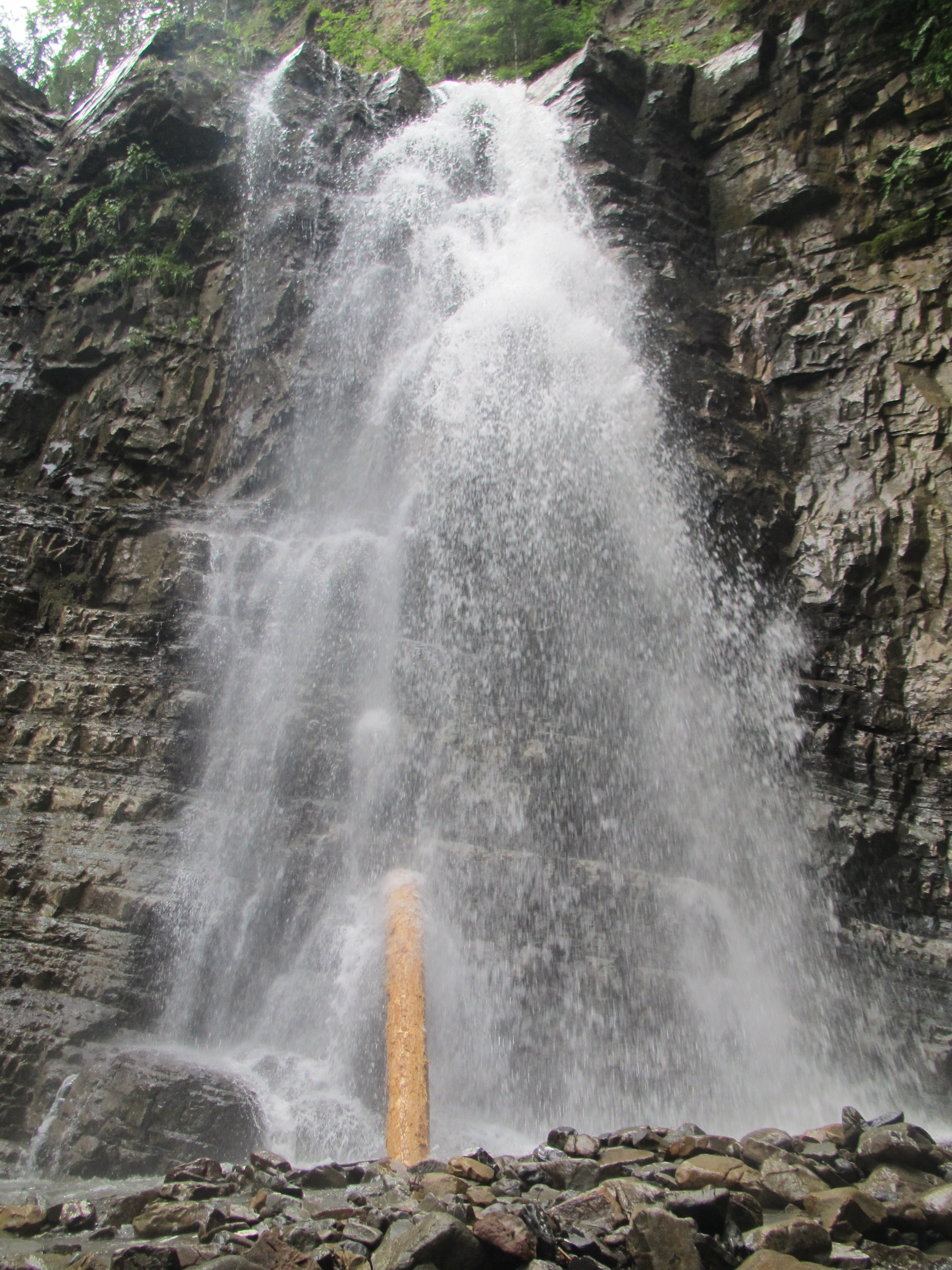
Maniava waterfall

Bukovel ski resort, centralized around the village of Polianytsia, on the ridge-lines of the Carpathian Mountain range at an elevation of 900 m (3,000 ft) represents a major all seasons tourist destination in the region. It is one of the most popular ski resorts in Eastern Europe and in 2012 was named the fastest growing ski resort in the world. Bukovel consists of 16 ski lifts with approximately 50 kilometers of pistes. As well as skiing visitors to the resort can enjoy 7 world class hotels, chalets with swimming pools and saunas, as well as numerous other recreational activities ranging from family friendly leisurely activities to extreme sports. During the warmer months the resort boasts cross-country and downhill mountain biking trails. Over 6,000 people visit the resort every year.

=== Historical and cultural sites ===
Recently, a monument of cultural heritage was erected in the city of Kolomyia in Pokuttia. The Pysanka Museum was built in 2000 and is the only museum dedicated to pyanskas in the world.

Another interesting historical site is the cavern complex in the Dovbush Rock. The site is dedicated to the legendary freedom fighter Oleksa Dovbush who in legend fights against the Polish szlachta. The rock complex is located about 7 miles (11 km) south west from Bolekhiv near village of Bubnyshche.

The Church of the Holy Spirit, built in 1598, is located in the north of the Oblast in the small city of Rohatyn.

Major castles in the oblast include Pniv Castle, Chornolytsia Castle, Rakovets Castle, and Halych Castle.

=== Popular culture ===
In 1979 Sofia Rotaru performed the song "Krai" ([Native] Land) about Prykarpattia. In the song Rotaru calls Prykarpattia the land of the Cheremosh and Prut rivers.

== Transportation ==
=== Roads ===
==== State highways ====
Through Ivano-Frankivsk Oblast runs one European route E50 which travels through the city of Rohatyn in the north. It coincides with the Ukrainian International highway M12 which is the only highway of that classification in the region. The highway travels from Zhydachiv in Lviv Oblast and after passing Rohatyn travels towards Berezhany in Ternopil Oblast.

Besides that highway, through the region run three highways of national importance.

- H09 traveling from Lviv the route enters the region from the north near Rohatyn and after passesing the cities of Ivano-Frankivsk and Yaremcha continues on towards Rakhiv going over the Carpathian ridge.
- H10 starts in Stryi, passes through Ivano-Frankivsk, Kolomyia and Sniatyn, and continues on towards Chernivtsi.
- H18 starts from the center of Ivano-Frnkivsk and through Tysmenytsia (Ivano-Frankivsk Oblast) and Monastyryska (Ternopil Oblast), terminating in Ternopil.

There is also small network of minor P-highways.

- P20 runs from Tyaziv (north of Ivano-Frankivsk) through Tlumach and Horodenka to Sniatyn.
- P21 runs from Dolyna over the Carpathian to Khust (Zakarpattia Oblast).
- P24 runs from Tatariv (Yaremche municipality) to Verkhovyna, Kosiv, Kolomyia, Hvizdets, Horodenka, and Ternopil Oblast.
- P38 runs from Bohorodchany to the village of Stara Huta.
- P62 runs from Verkhniy Yaseniv (Verkhovyna Raion) to Usteriky, then by the Prut valley and the Chernivtsi Oblast border travels to Kuty where it turns into Chernivtsi Oblast towards Storozhynets.

==== Regional highways ====
T-network (09) includes:

- T0901 - Kalush, Yasen, Kuzmynets
- T0902 - Borshniv-Osada, Rozhniativ, Kosmach, Nadvirna
- T0903 - Halych, Medukha, Zastavche, Pidhaitsi
- T0904 - Ozeriany, Obertyn, Hvizdets, Zabolotiv, Rozhniv, Kuty
- T0905 - Deliatyn, Lanchyn, Kolomyia
- T0906 - Ivano-Frankivsk, Cherniiv, Nadvirna, Bystrytsia
- T0909 - Kosiv, Rozhniv, Sniatyn
- T0910 - Kalush, Burshtyn
- T0911 - Bolekhiv, Tysiv, Kozakivka
- T0915 - Pistyn, Mykytyntsi, Verkhnii Verbizh
- T1417 - (Lviv Oblast) Kurovychi, Peremyshliany, Rohatyn
- T1419 - (Lviv Oblast) Kalush, Zhuravno, Zhydachiv, Rozdil, Mykolaiv
- T2601 - (Chernivtsi Oblast) / (Romanian border) (route 209G) Seliatyn, Parkulyna, Dykhtynets, Marynychi, Pidzakharychi, Kuty, Sloboda Banyliv, Chortoryia, Hlynytsia, Chernivtsi
- T2621 - (Chernivtsi Oblast) Horodenka, Khreshchatyk
- T2648 - (Chernivtsi Oblast) Vyzhnytsia, Kuty, Pidzakharychi

== Notable people ==
People born in Prykarpattia include:

Historical figures

- Yaroslav Osmomysl, prince of Halych
- Roxelana, chief consort of Ottoman sultan Suleiman the Magnificent
- Semen Vysochan, a leader of the Khmelnytsky Uprising beginning in 1648
- Potocki family, Polish high nobles (magnates)
  - Józef Potocki, Great Hetman of the Crown
- Oleksa Dovbush, 18th century folk hero
- Stepan Bandera, Ukrainian far-right leader of the radical militant faction of the Organization of Ukrainian Nationalists
- Dmytro Vitovsky, Austro-Hungarian and later Ukrainian separatist politician and military leader

Writers

- Mariyka Pidhiryanka
- Vasyl Stefanyk
- Les Martovych
- Ivan Vahylevych
- Marko Cheremshyna
- Manès Sperber

Artists

- Sviatoslav Hordynsky, founder of the Association of Independent Ukrainian Artists
- Mariia Stefiuk, opera singer
- Mika Newton, singer
- Dmytro Pavlychko, poet

== Gallery ==
Pysanka Museum

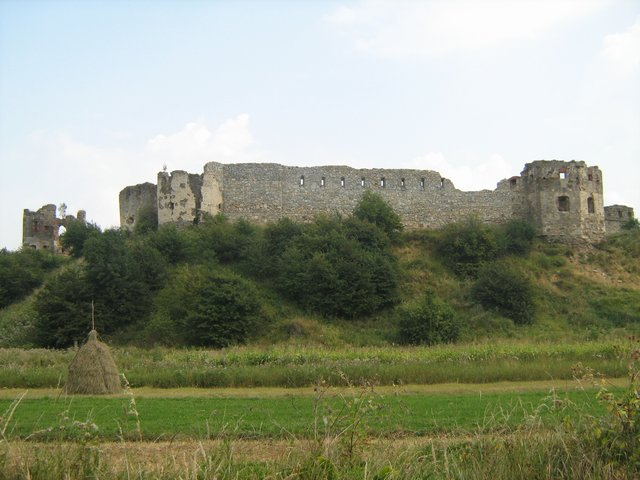
Pniv Castle

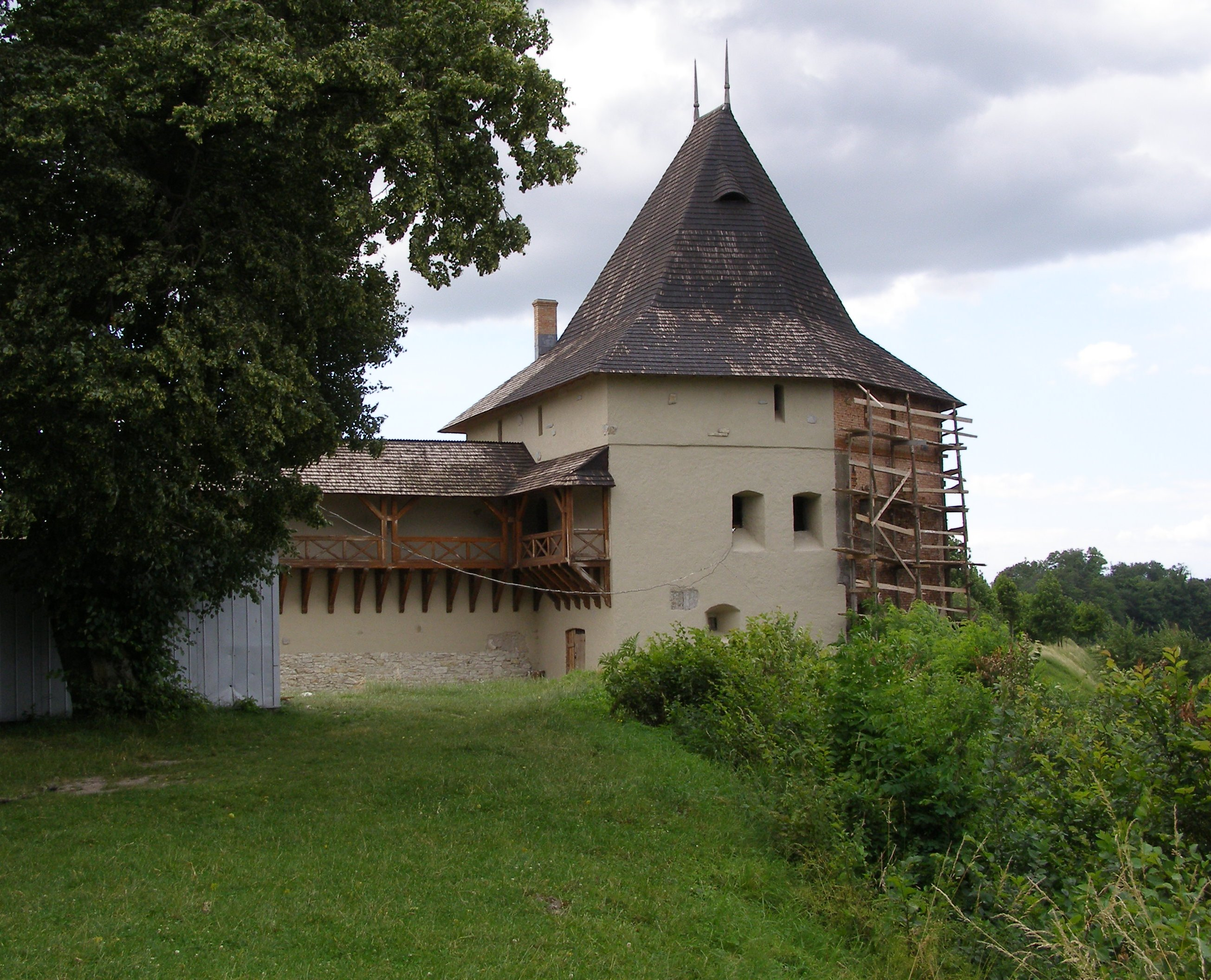
Halych Castle

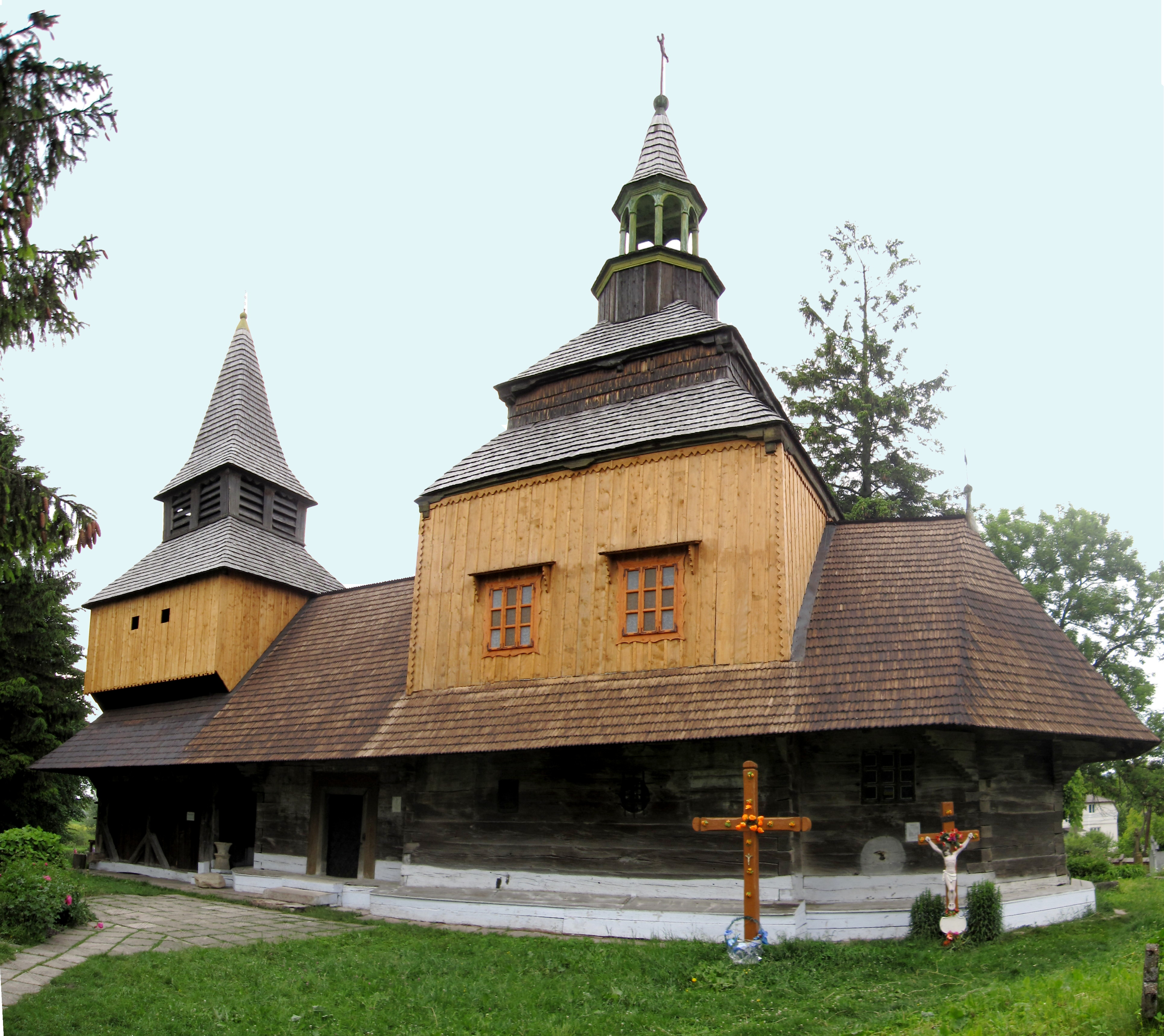
Church of the Holy Spirit in Rohatyn

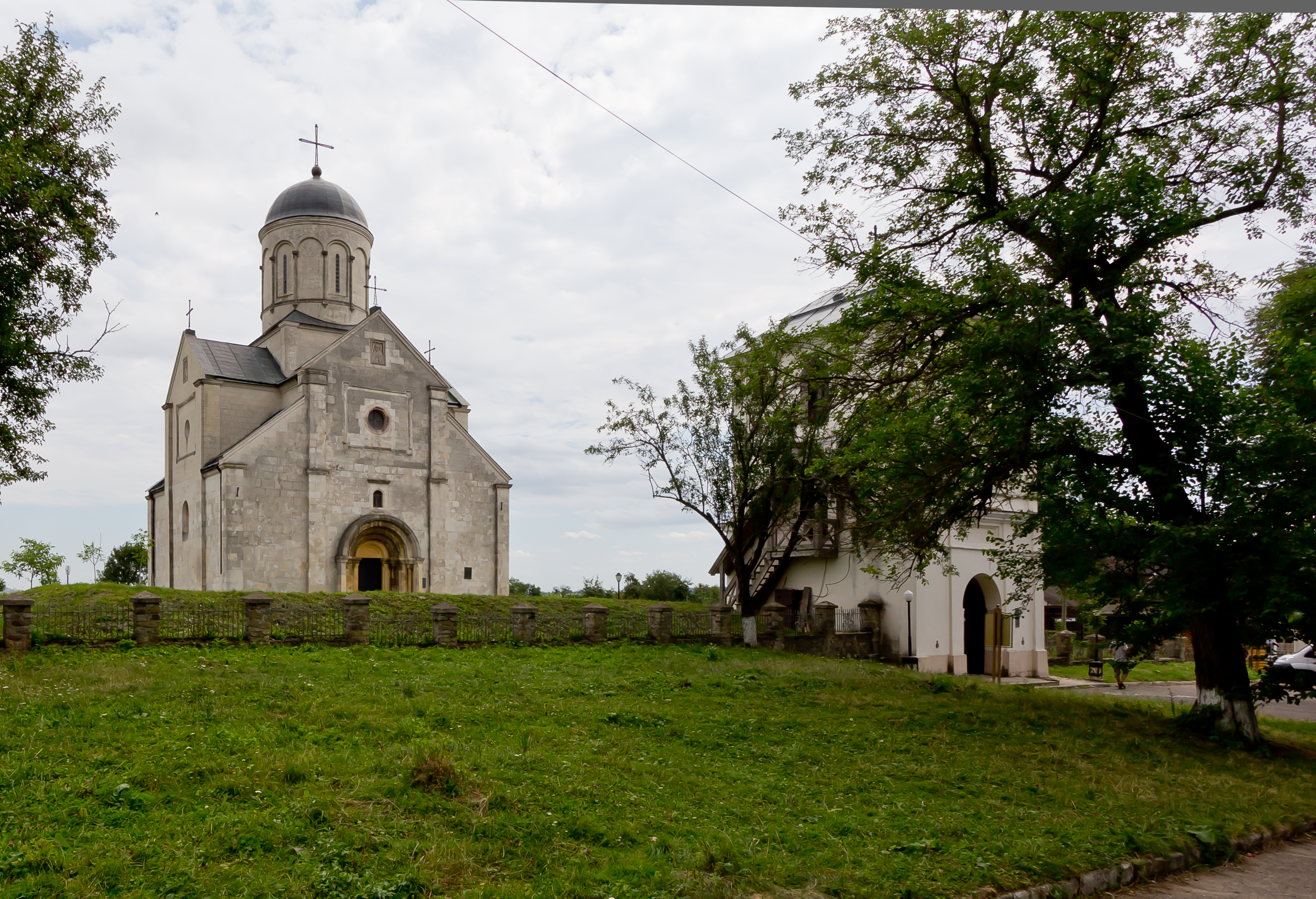
St. Pantaleon Church in Shevchenkove

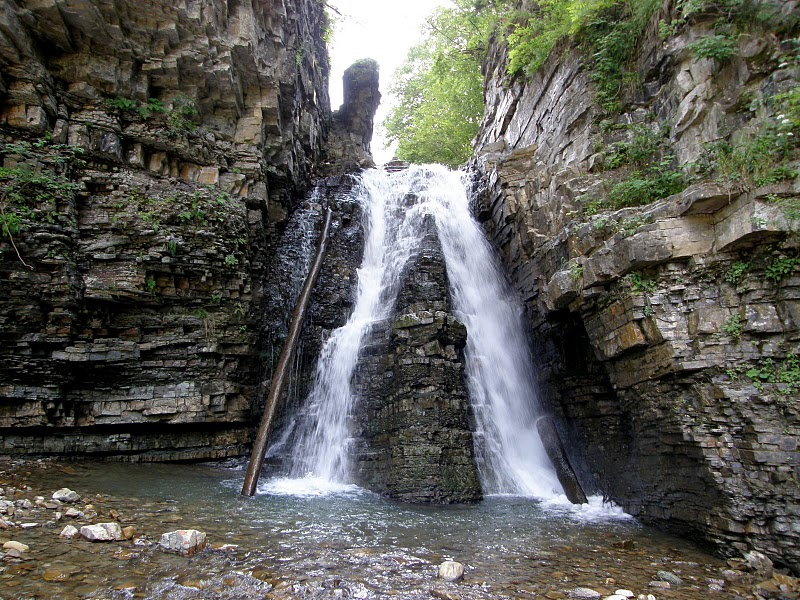
Bukhtivetskyi Waterfall

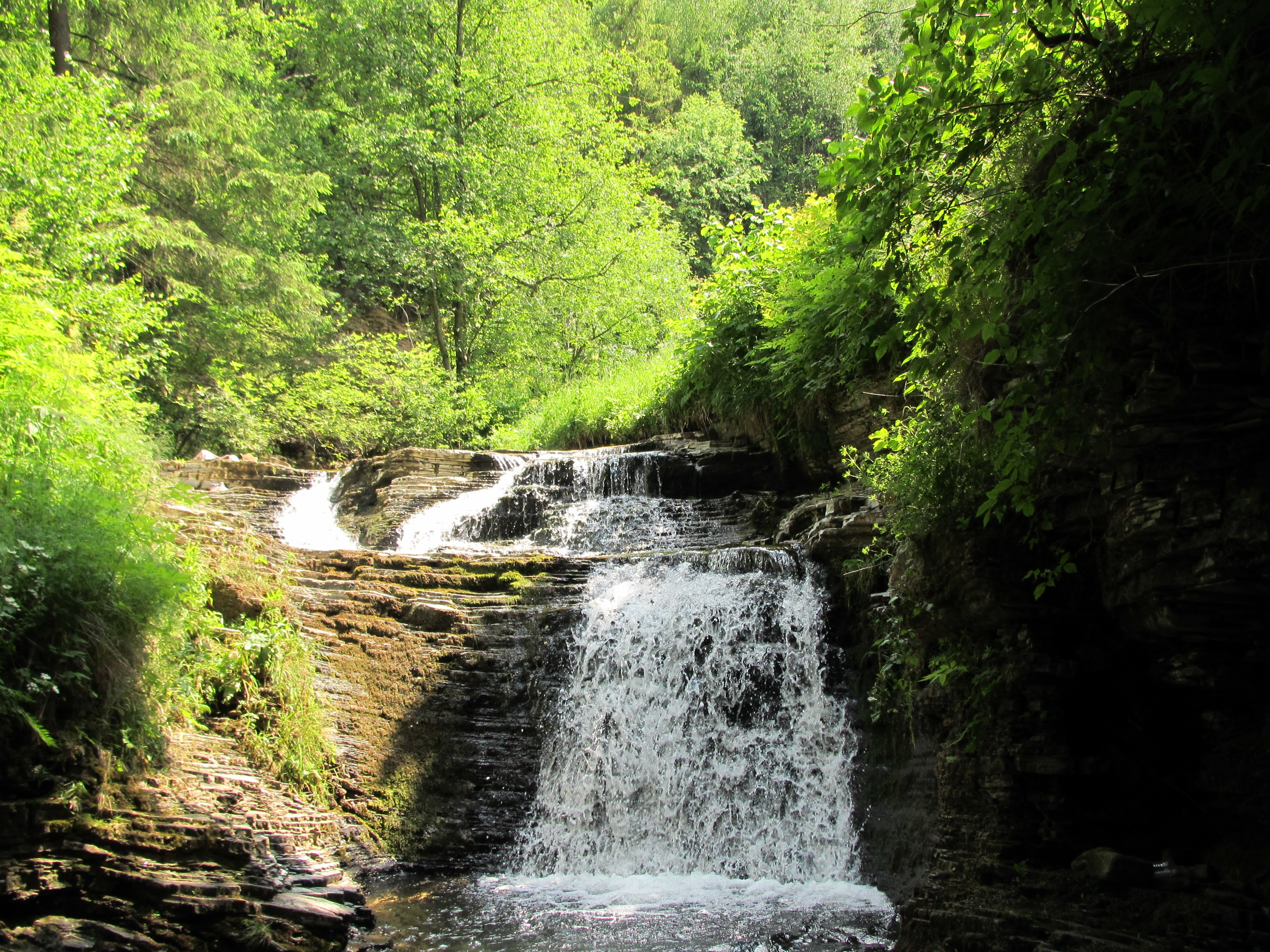
Sukil Waterfalls

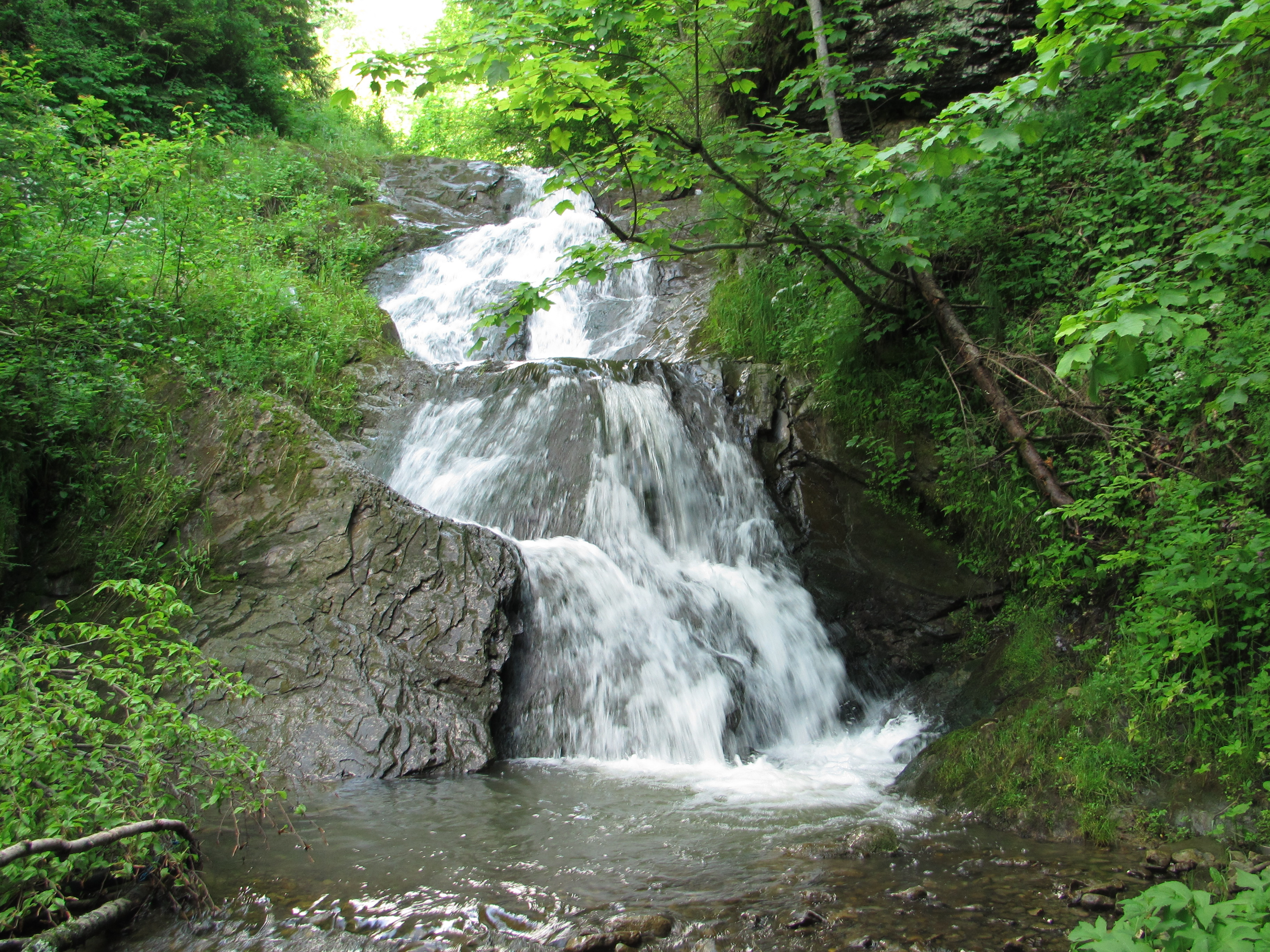
Yavorivskyi Huk

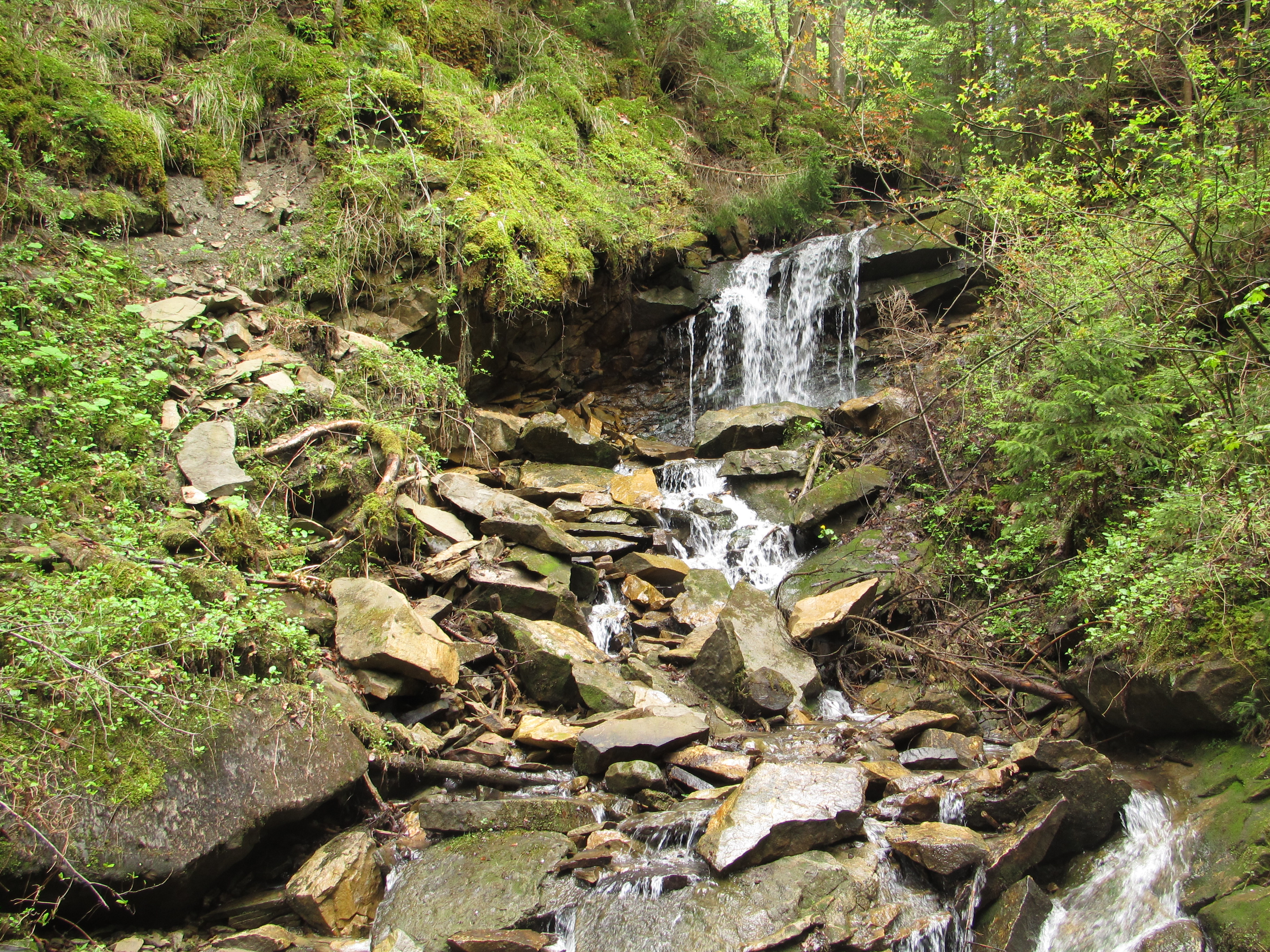
Tsiva

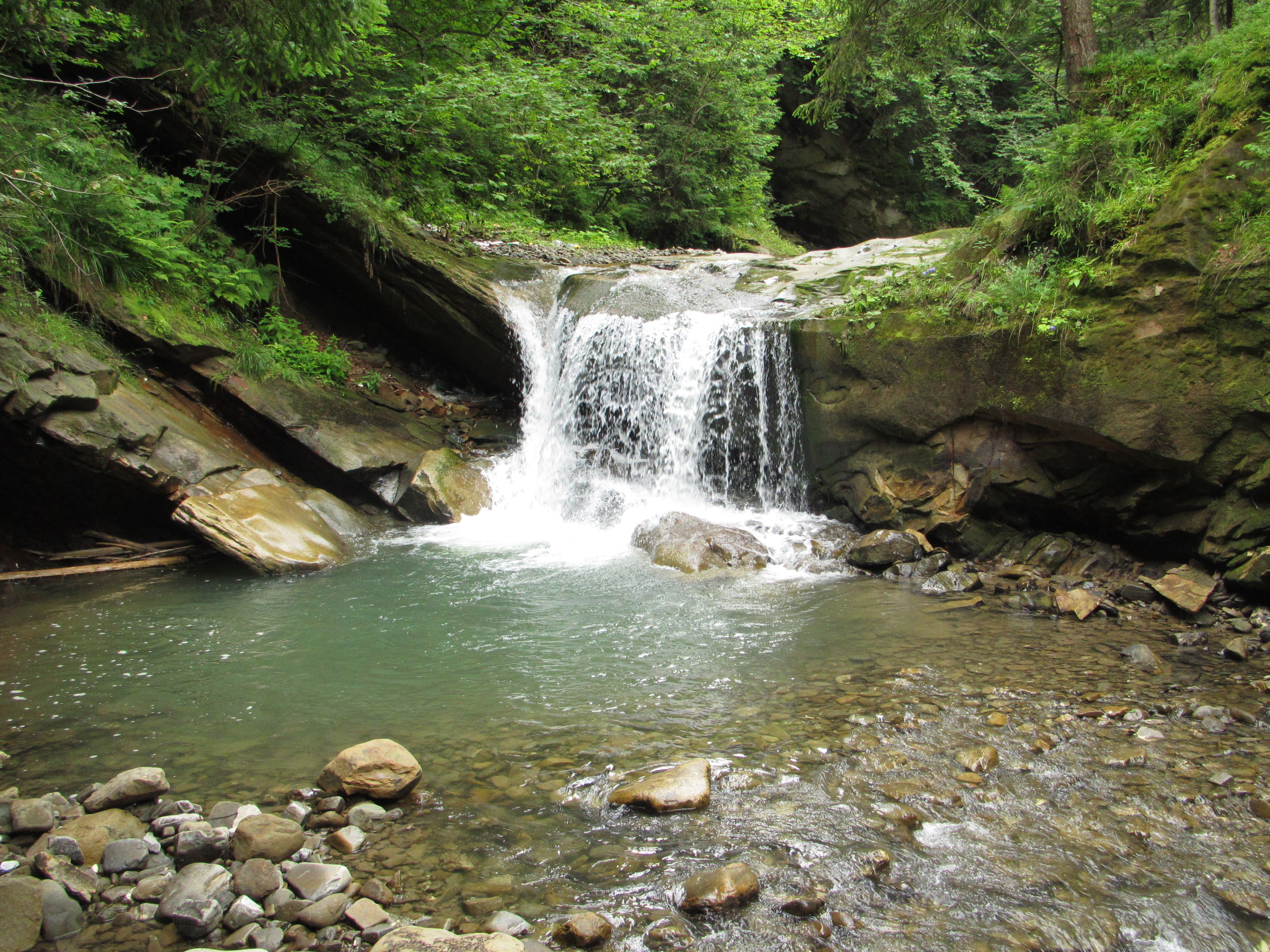
Shepitskyi Huk small

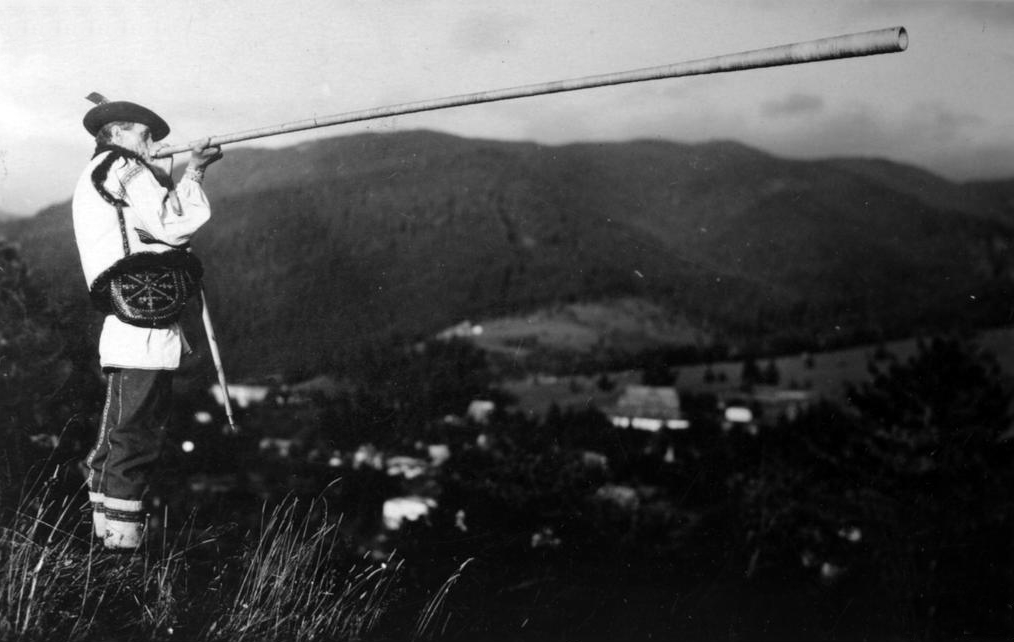
A Hutsul playing a trembita

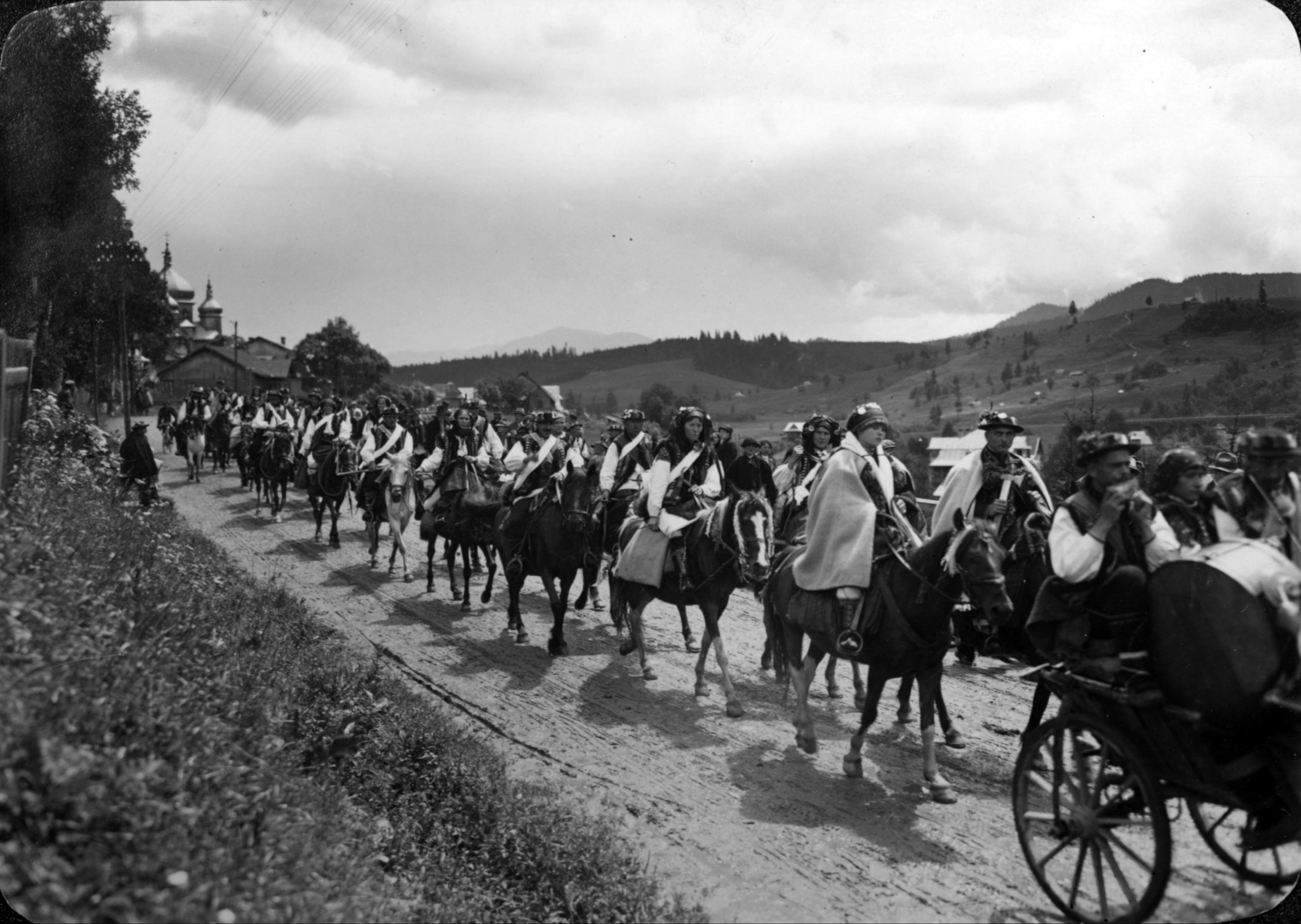
Hutsuls in traditional dress in wedding ceremony in Vorokhta

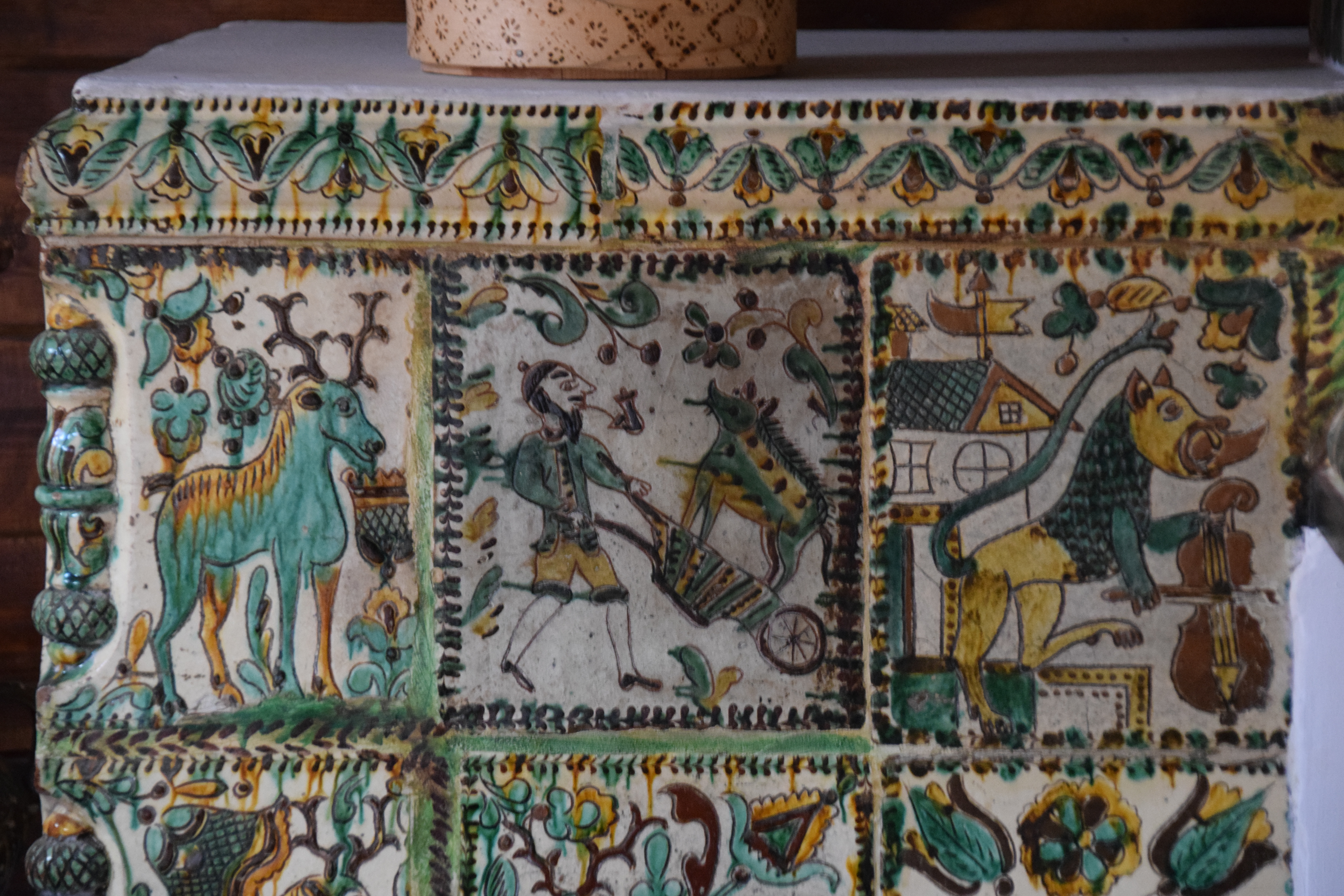
Kosiv painted ceramics

== See also ==
- Poland's Stanisławów Voivodeship (1921–1939)
- List of Canadian place names of Ukrainian origin – Ukrainian immigrants to Canada brought place names from this oblast to Saskatchewan and Alberta; a few one-room schools had names of villages from this region.
- Ivano-Frankivsk Oblast local election, 2006
- List of heads of government in Ivano-Frankivsk Oblast and Stanislawow Voivodeship
