= P24 road (Ukraine) =

Road in Ukraine

Road P24 (Ukraine)
- Автошлях Р24 (Ukraine)
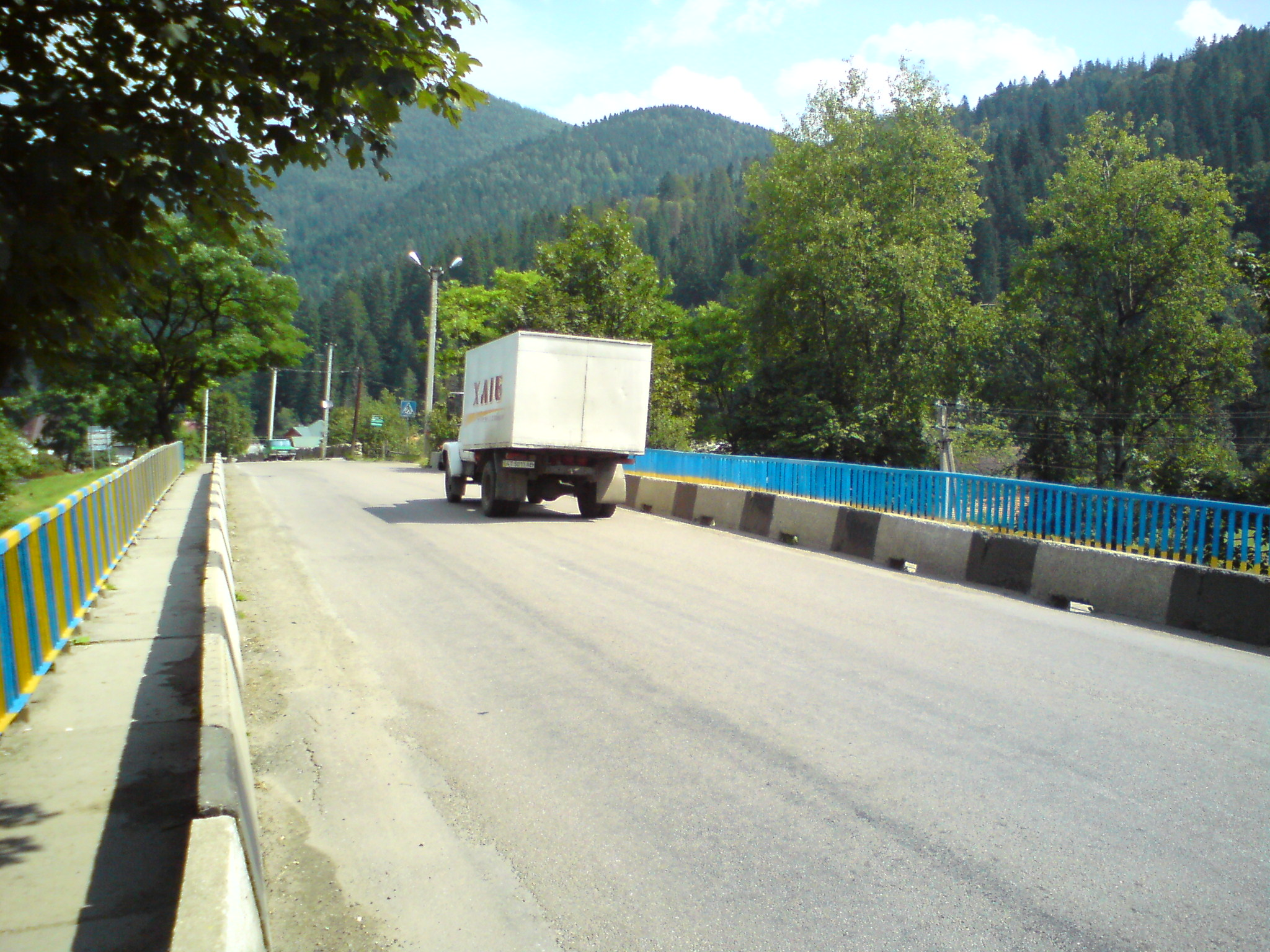
- Tatariv village. Highway P -24

Route information
- Length: 253.9 km (157.8 mi)

Major junctions
- West end: H 09 in Tatariv
- East end: H 03 in Kamianets-Podilskyi

Location
- Country: Ukraine
- Oblasts: Ivano-Frankivsk, Ternopil and Khmelnytsky

Highway system
- Roads in Ukraine; State Highways

Road P-24 is a motor road of regional significance in Ukraine. Passes through the territory of Ivano-Frankivsk Oblast, Ternopil Oblast and Khmelnytskyi Oblasts.

== Whole length ==
The total length of the road, Tatariv village (Vorokhta municipality) – Kosiv – Kolomyia - Borshchiv - Kamianets-Podilskyi is 253.9 kilometres (157.8 mi).

== Main route ==
Route map: P 24:

Route P24
Ivano-Frankivsk Oblast
Nadvirna Raion
Tatariv village	H 09	0 kilometres (0 mi)
Vorokhta		8 kilometres (5.0 mi)
Verkhovyna Raion
Kryvopillya		25 kilometres (16 mi)
Staische		30 kilometres (19 mi)
Iltsi		34 kilometres (21 mi)
Verkhovyna		40 kilometres (25 mi)
Kryvorivnya		46 kilometres (29 mi)
48-th km	P 62	48 kilometres (30 mi)
Kosiv Raion
Yavorov village		60 kilometres (37 mi)
Sokolovka		66 kilometres (41 mi)
Kosiv		75 kilometres (47 mi)
Stary Kosiv	T-0909	79 kilometres (49 mi)
Pistyn	T-0915	87 kilometres (54 mi)
Stopchativ		97 kilometres (60 mi)
Kolomyia Raion
Myishin		102 kilometres (63 mi)
Verhniy Verbizh		107 kilometres (66 mi)
Kolomyia	H 10	115 kilometres (71 mi)
Pidgaychiki		125 kilometres (78 mi)
Hvizdets	T-0904	133 kilometres (83 mi)
Soroky		141 kilometres (88 mi)
Chernyatin		149 kilometres (93 mi)
Horodenka	P 20	153 kilometres (95 mi)
Dniester river		168 kilometres (104 mi)
Ternopil Oblast
Chortkiv Raion
intersection with	E85 M 19	177 kilometres (110 mi)
Tovste	E85 M 19	184 kilometres (114 mi)
Lysivtsi		191 kilometres (119 mi)
Vierkhnakovtsy		206 kilometres (128 mi)
Borshchiv	T-2002 T-2015	210 kilometres (130 mi)
Ivankiv		220 kilometres (140 mi)
Skala-Podilska		224 kilometres (139 mi)
Khmelnytskyi Oblast
Kamianets-Podilskyi Raion
Gukiv	T-2008	228 kilometres (142 mi)
Burty		232 kilometres (144 mi)
Orynin		242 kilometres (150 mi)
intersection with	P 48	247 kilometres (153 mi)
Kamianets-Podilskyi		253.9 kilometres (157.8 mi)
