= Highway H09 (Ukraine) =

Highway in Ukraine

Highway H09
- Автошлях Н09
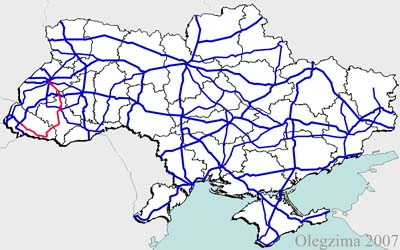

Route information
- Length: 423.6 km (263.2 mi)

Major junctions
- south end: E58 M 06 in Mukachevo
- north end: E40 M 06 in Lviv

Location
- Country: Ukraine
- Oblasts: Lviv, Zakarpattia, Ivano-Frankivsk

Highway system
- Roads in Ukraine; State Highways
← H 08	→ H 10

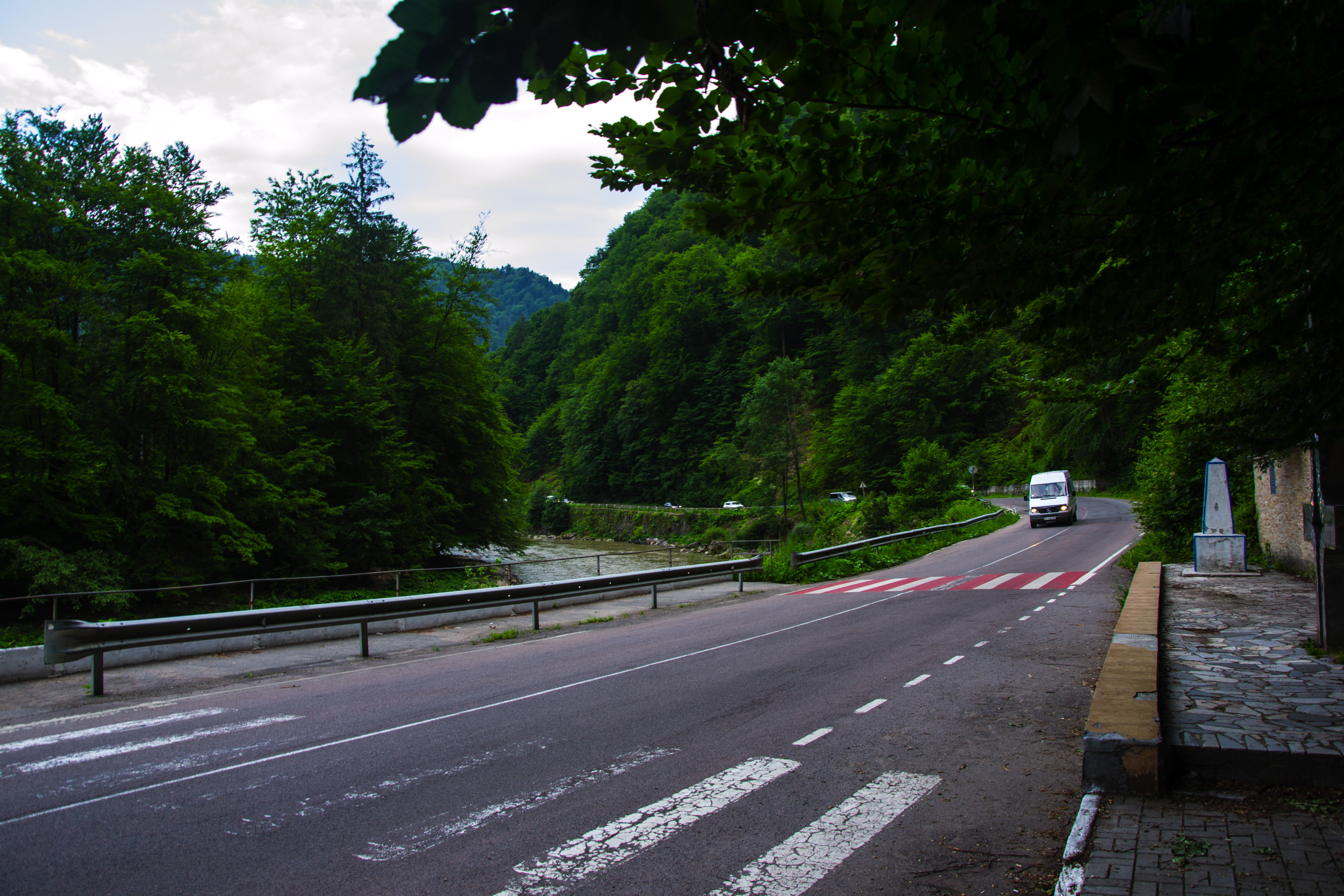
H09 road near Dilove

H09 is a national road (H-Highway) in Lviv Oblast, Ivano-Frankivsk Oblast and Zakarpattia Oblast, Ukraine. It runs north–south and connects Mukachevo with Lviv.

== Main route ==
Main route and connections to/intersections with other highways in Ukraine.

Marker	Main settlements	Notes	Highway interchanges
Zakarpattia Oblast
0 km	Mukachevo	through city	E58 M 06 • T0739
	Kamianske		T0717
	Siltse	Irshavka River	T0719
	Velyka Kopan		M 23
	Khust	city's loop route	P 21 • T0737
	Bushtyno		T0737 • T0720
	Solotvyno	Solotvyno-Sighetu Marmatiei bridge	
	Dilove	rail border crossing with Romania	
Ivano-Frankivsk Oblast
	Yablunytsia	access to Bukovel	
	Tatariv		P 24
	Deliatyn		T0905
	Nadvirna	through city	T0906 (as loop route)
	Pidhiria	near Bohorodchany	P 38
	Drahomyrchany		H 10
	Ivano-Frankivsk		H 10 (Kalush Highway at Pasichna)
	Tyaziv		P 20
	Halych		T0903
	Burshtyn	Burshtyn TES	T0910
	Rohatyn	through city • one spur	E50 M 12 • T1417
Lviv Oblast
	Bibrka		T1425
	Pasiky-Zubrytski		E40 M 06
423.6 km	Lviv	enters at Sykhiv as Zelena vulytsia	

== See also ==
- Roads in Ukraine
