= 2006 Ivano-Frankivsk Oblast local election =

Local election in Ukraine

- 26 March 2006

All 120 seats to the Ivano-Frankivsk Oblast Council
	Majority party	Minority party	Third party
Leader	Vyacheslav Kyrylenko	Yulia Tymoshenko	Yury Kostenko
Party	Our Ukraine	Tymoshenko Bloc	Kostenko and Plyushch Bloc
Seats won	62	37	9
Popular vote	322 671	194 302	48 206
Percentage	40.60%	24.44%	6.10%
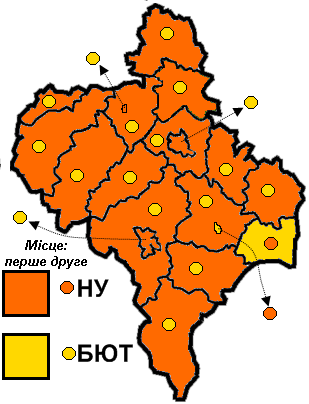
- Results for districts. Orange is Our Ukraine Bloc, Yellow is Yulia Tymoshenko Bloc.
Head of Council before election
Vasyl Brus
Independent
Elected Head of Council
Ihor Oliynyk
Our Ukraine

Ivano-Frankivsk Oblast local election, 2006 is a local election in Ivano-Frankivsk Oblast that took place on March 26, 2006. Seats were split among five political parties and blocks, which received at least 3% popular vote.

== Overview ==
The elections were largely won by Our Ukraine Bloc with the greatest majority of 57% in the Yaremche municipality. The lowest popularity of the political bloc was in the biggest cities in the region Ivano-Frankivsk and Kolomyia and if the city of Ivano-Frankivsk Our Ukraine marginally has won, the Kolomyia municipality was decisively "overtaken" by the Yulia Tymoshenko Bloc.

The greatest support for the region's third party Ukrainian National Bloc was shown in the western corner of Ivano-Frankivsk Oblast where in the Bolekhiv municipality and the Dolyna Raion the party managed to make over 10% mark. Also, remarkable performance of the Revival of Prykarapattya that even though barely made it to the regional council it had a substantial support in the Verkhovyna Raion where it, however, became the third party. Revival of Prykarpattya also became third in the Kolomyia municipality and the Kolomyia Raion.

== Results ==
Seats and percentage
Our Ukraine Bloc (62)	40.60%
Yulia Tymoshenko Bloc (37)	24.44%
Ukrainian National Bloc (9)	6.00%
Bloc "National choice" (7)	4.71%
Revival of Prykarapattya (5)	3.01%

Presidium of the Council

- Chairman: Ihor Oliynyk (Our Ukraine Bloc - Rukh)
- First Deputy Chairman: Zinoviy Berehovsky (Our Ukraine Bloc - Our Ukraine)
- Deputy Chairman: Ostap Dzesa (Our Ukraine Bloc - PPPU)
- Director of Council's secretariat: Vasyl Losyuk

== Electoral maps ==
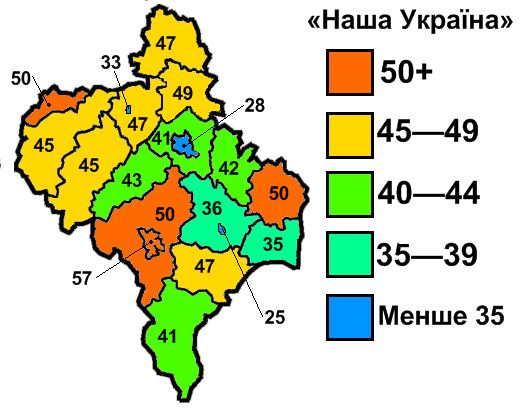

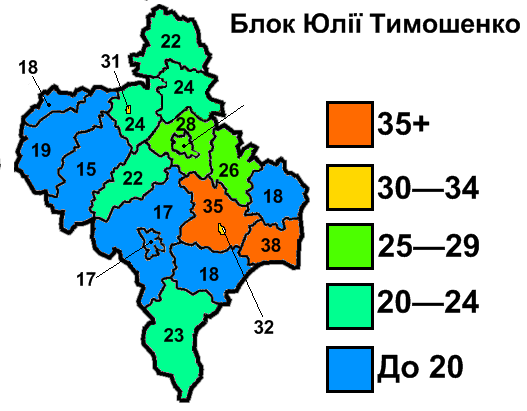

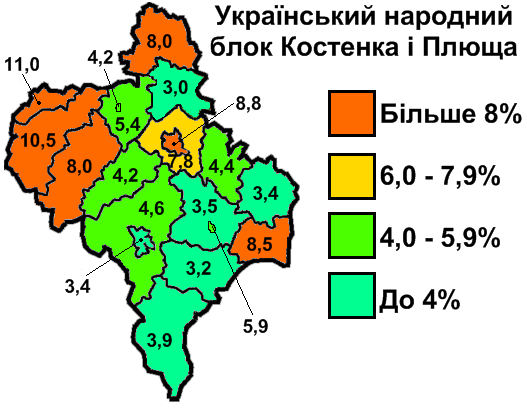

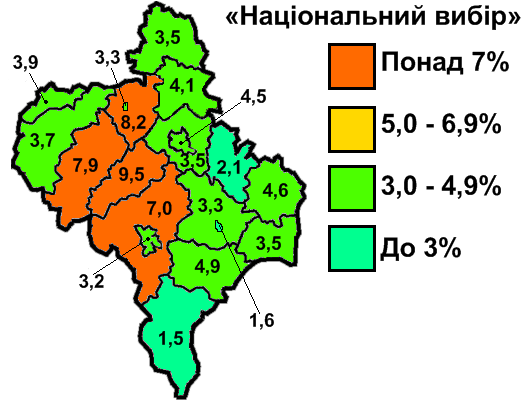

== Ivano-Frankivsk city council ==
Seats and percentage
Our Ukraine Bloc (22)	36.67%
Yulia Tymoshenko Bloc (17)	28.33%
Ukrainian National Bloc (14)	23.33%
Party of Regions (4)	6.67%
PORA (3)	5.00%

Mayor

Viktor Anuškevičius (Ukrainian National Bloc - Ukrainian People's Party)
