= Bystrytsia Solotvynska =

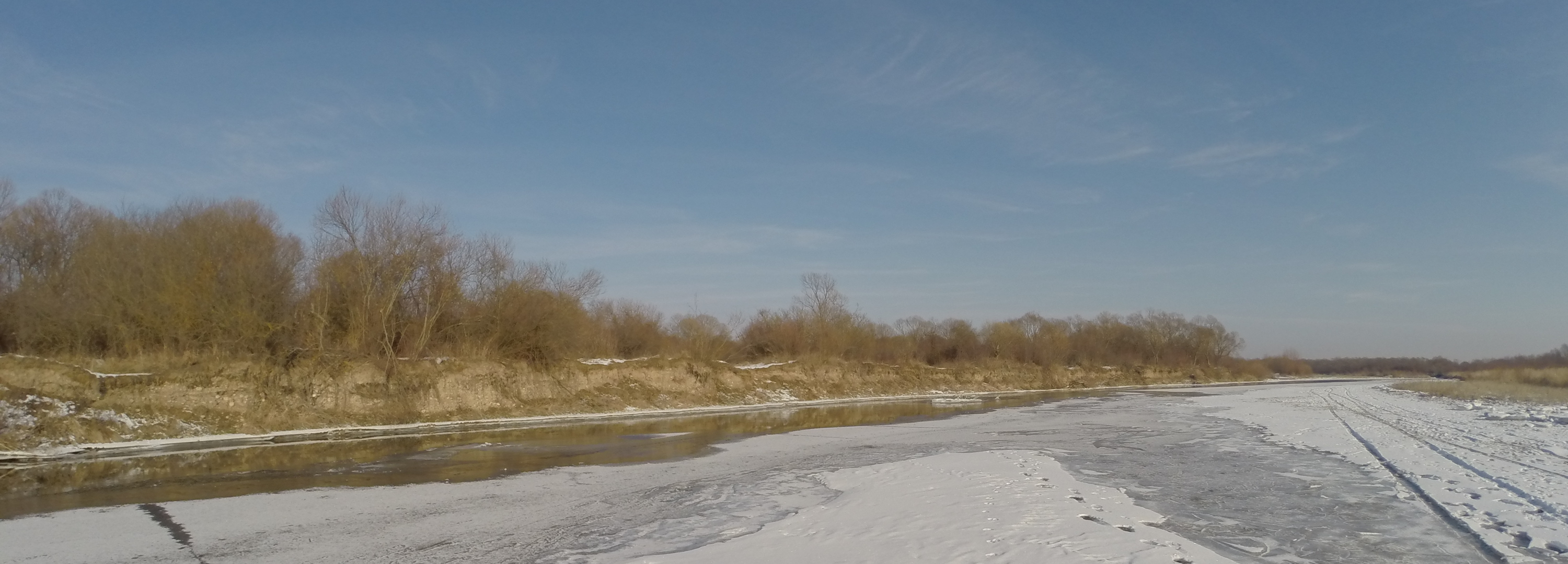
- Bystrytsia Solotvynska a few kilometres south of Ivano-Frankivsk

Location
- Country: Ukraine

Physical characteristics
- Mouth: Bystrytsia
  - coordinates: 48.9608°N 24.7402°E
- Length: 82 km (51 mi)
- Basin size: 795 km^{2} (307 sq mi)

Basin features
- Progression: Bystrytsia→ Dniester→ Dniester Estuary→ Black Sea

The Bystrytsia Solotvynska (Ukrainian: Бистриця Солотвинська) is a river in Ivano-Frankivsk Oblast of western Ukraine. It joins the Bystrytsia Nadvirnianska just north of Ivano-Frankivsk creating the Bystrytsia River. Its name is based on the town of Solotvyn through which the river passes.

It originates on the northern foothills of Small Syvulia mountain (Gorgany mountain massif). Its length is 82 km (51 mi) and basin is 795 km^{2} (307 sq mi).

The river has some tributary rivers: the Manyavka, the Sadzhavka, the Radchanka, and the Great Lukavets.
