= Bystrytsia Nadvirnianska =

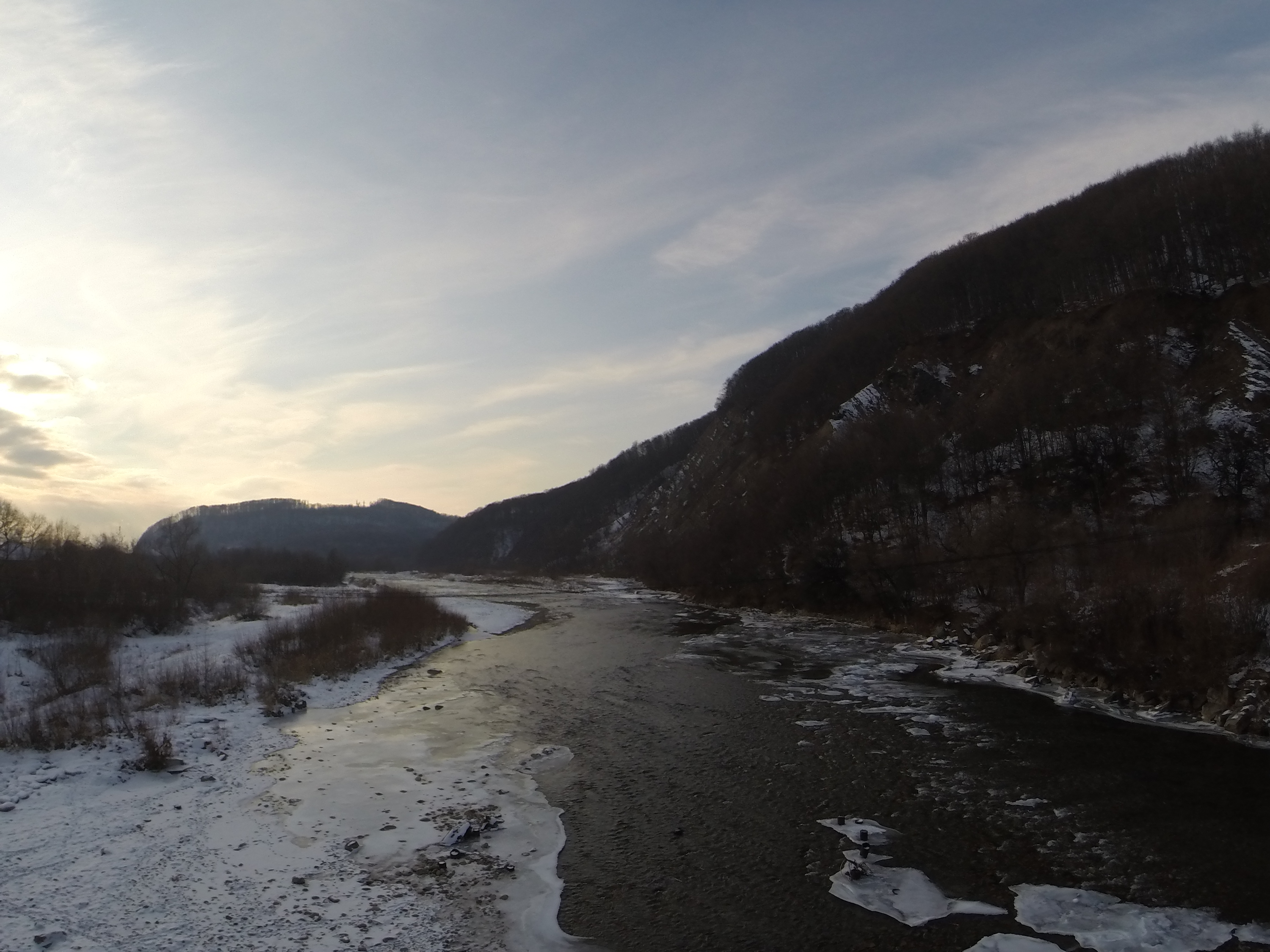
- Bystrytsia Nadvirnianska at the northern end of Nadvirna

Location
- Country: Ukraine

Physical characteristics
- Mouth: Bystrytsia
  - coordinates: 48.9608°N 24.7402°E
- Length: 94 km (58 mi)
- Basin size: 1,580 km^{2} (610 sq mi)

Basin features
- Progression: Bystrytsia→ Dniester→ Dniester Estuary→ Black Sea

Bystrytsia Nadvirnianska (Ukrainian: Бистриця Надвірнянська) is a river in Ivano-Frankivsk Oblast of western Ukraine. It joins the Bystrytsia Solotvynska just north of Ivano-Frankivsk creating the Bystrytsia River.

It originates on the northern slopes of Black Kleva mountain (Gorgany mountain massif). Its length is 94 km (58 mi) and basin is 1,580 km^{2} (610 sq mi).

There are two cities located on the river: Nadvirna and Ivano-Frankivsk. The river has some tributary rivers: Salatruk (left); Dovzhynets, Zelenytsia, Vorona (all on the right).
