= Highway H10 (Ukraine) =

Highway in Ukraine

Highway H10
- Автошлях Н10
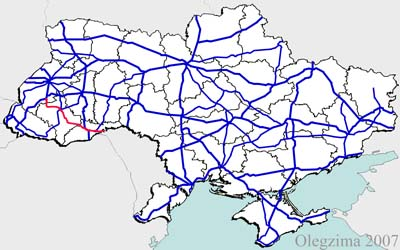

Major junctions
- Northwest end: Stryi
- Southeast end: Mamalyha

Location
- Country: Ukraine
- Oblasts: Lviv, Ivano-Frankivsk Oblast, Chernivtsi

Highway system
- Roads in Ukraine; State Highways
| ← H 09 | → H 11 |

H10 is an important Ukraine national highway (H-highway) in Lviv, Ivano-Frankivsk, and Chernivtsi Oblasts.

== History ==
H10 belonged to the Kingdom of Galicia and Lodomeria until 1918 and was known as the Beskydy Reichsstraße. In 1817, it was built as the second east-west connection leading from Bielsko-Biała to Chernivtsi and was initially referred to as the Carpathian Road. In 1893, there were 21 toll booths on the 260-kilometer stretch between Stryi and Chernivtsi.

The stretch from Stryi to Stanislaviv (former name of Ivano-Frankivsk) belonged to the territory of the Second Polish Republic between 1918 and 1939 and was declared a state road (droga państwowa) by the Polish Roads Act of 10 December 1920.

== See also ==
- Roads in Ukraine
- Ukraine State Highways
