= Halych Raion =

Former subdivision of Ivano-Frankivsk Oblast, Ukraine

Halych Raion Галицький район
- Raion
- Halytskyi raion
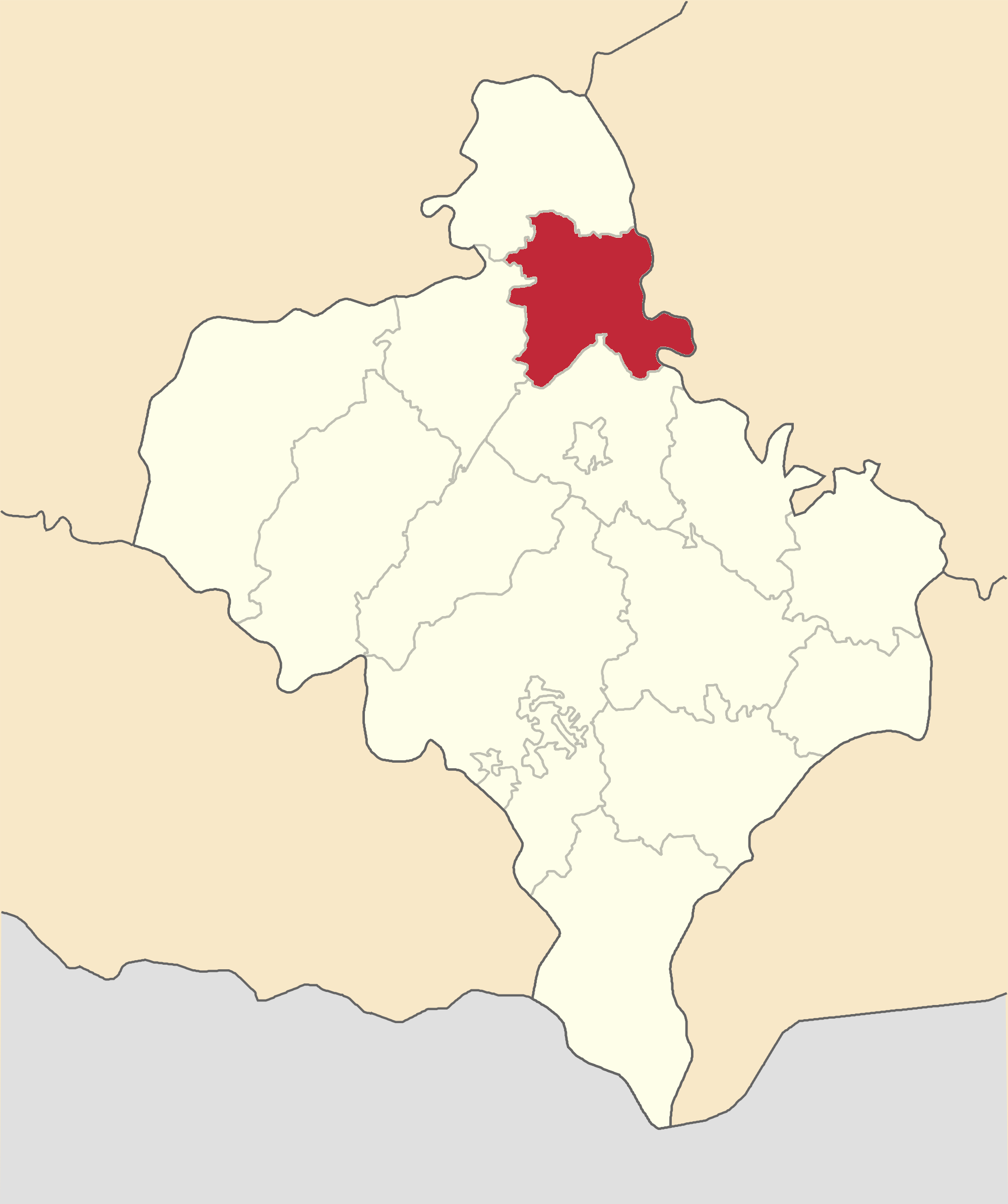
- Coordinates: 49°9′41″N 24°43′6″E
- Country: Ukraine
- Oblast: Ivano-Frankivsk Oblast
- Disestablished: 2020
- Admin. center: Halych
- Subdivisions: List: — city councils; — settlement councils; — rural councils; Number of localities: — cities; — urban-type settlements; — villages; — rural settlements

Government
  - Governor: Vasyl Kruk

Area
  - Total: 723 km^{2} (279 sq mi)

Population (2020)
  - Total: 41,948
  - Density: 58.0/km^{2} (150/sq mi)
- Time zone: UTC+02:00 (EET)
  - Summer (DST): UTC+03:00 (EEST)
- Postal index: 77104
- Area code: ?
- Website: Raion Profile

Halych Raion (Ukrainian: Галицький райо́н, romanized: Halyc'kyj rajon) was a raion (district) of Ivano-Frankivsk Oblast (region) in Ukraine. The town of Halych served as the administrative center of the district. The raion was abolished on 18 July 2020 as part of the administrative reform of Ukraine, which reduced the number of raions of Ivano-Frankivsk Oblast Oblast to six. The area of Halych Raion was merged into Ivano-Frankivsk Raion. The last estimate of the raion population was 41,948 (2020 est.).

== Subdivisions ==
At the time of disestablishment, the raion consisted of three hromadas:

- Bilshivtsi settlement hromada with the administration in the urban-type settlement of Bilshivtsi;
- Dubivtsi rural hromada with the administration in the selo of Dubivtsi;
- Halych urban hromada with the administration in Halych.

== History ==
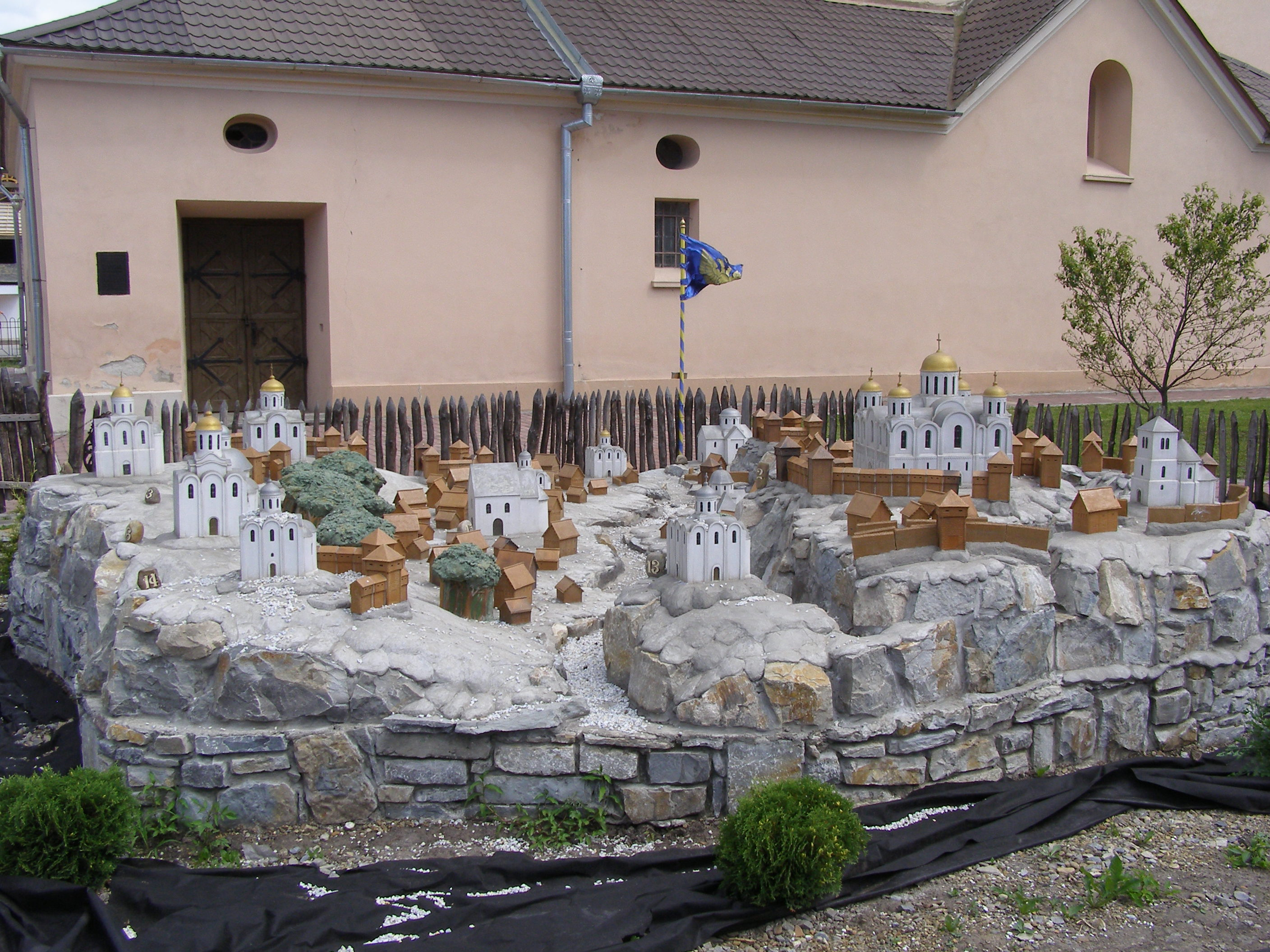
A mockup of once a prominent European capital.

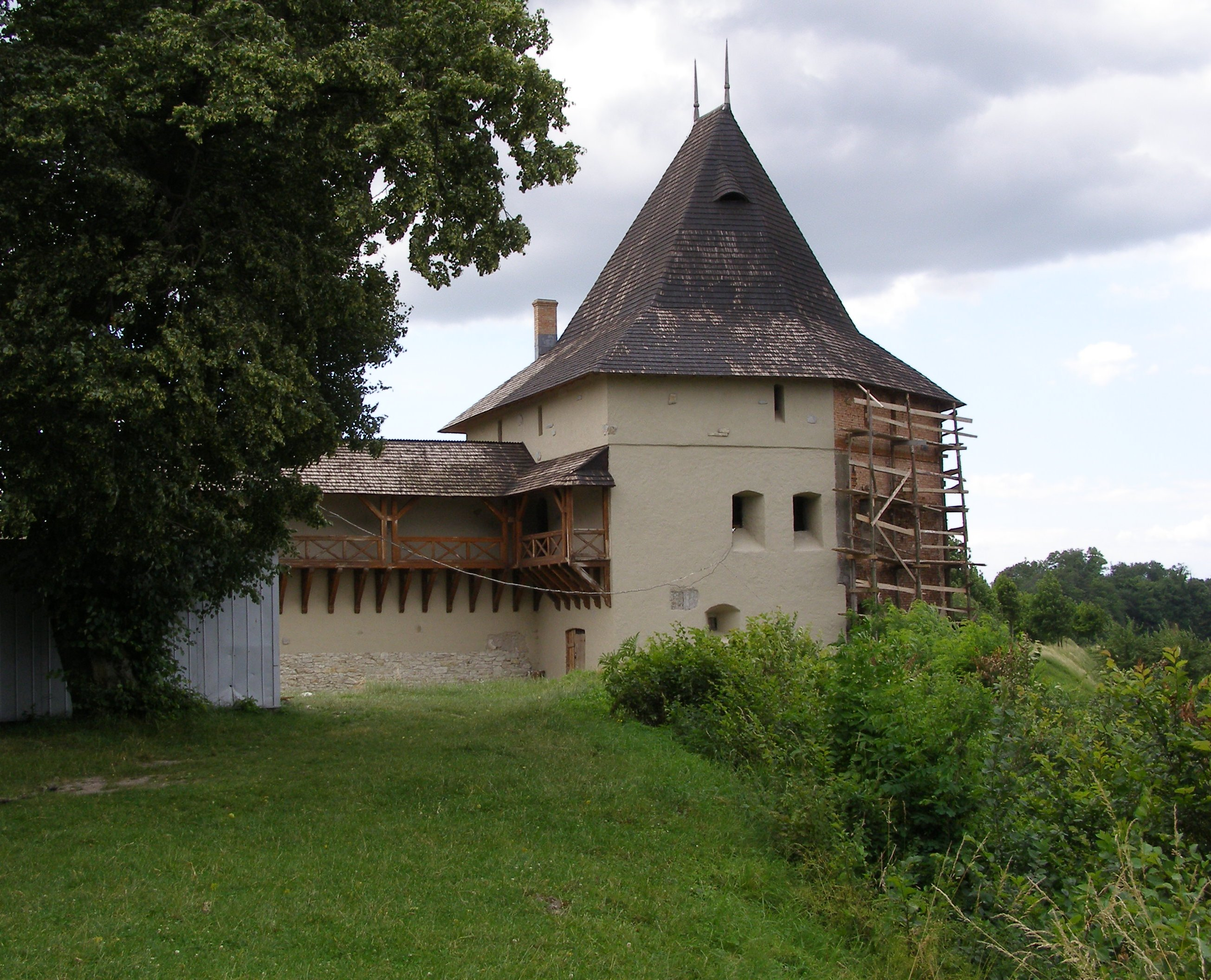
Ruins of the Halych Castle near village of Krylos.

The Halych Raion was organized on 20 January 1940, soon after the Soviet invasion of Poland, roughly from the Rohatyn and Stanisławów powiats of Stanisławów Voivodeship. From 1944 to 1962 the administrative center was located in the urban-type settlement of Burshtyn. In 1963 the territory of Bilshivtsi Raion (1940–1963) was brought under Halych administration. In 1993 Burshtyn received back its city status which it lost in 1942.

The later administrative center, the city of Halych, has long history. Prior to the mid-13th century it was the center of the once prominent Halych-Volyn Principality. In 1241 the city of Halych was destroyed during the Mongol invasion therefore the state capital was transferred to Kholm by the King Danylo Halytsky, while the destroyed Halych with the surrounding settlement was left as the bishop residence. Around this period the area was under series of conflicts involving the struggle between the Ruthenian factions as well as Kingdom of Poland, Kingdom of Hungary, Grand Duchy of Lithuania, and Golden Horde. In the 13th century the Halych Principality as part of the Ruthenian (Rus) Kingdom stretched from Przemyśl to Podolia, form Mukacheve to Terebovl, and from Busk to the Southern Bucovina.

By the end of the 13th century the Kingdom went into a heavy conflict with Lithuania, Poland, and Hungary with partial successes and failures. Upon the death of Lev I of Galicia the whole Kingdom went into decline due to a civil war. In 1323 the fall of the Polish-Ruthenian coalition against the Lithuanians the local boyars installed Boleslaw-Yuri II of Galicia. That move only strained the Ruthenian-Polish relationships which after short conflict ended the sovereignty of the Ruthenian Kingdom and the Halych Principality was annexed to the Kingdom of Poland in 1349. The partition of the Ruthenian Kingdom ensued the Galicia–Volhynia Wars as both Lithuania and Polish states fought for their expansion east. The new town of Halych was soon re-established in close proximity to the bishop's residence, receiving its Magdeburg Rights in 1367. Later its new castle was built sometime in the 16th century. By this time the area of the modern Halych Raion lost its importance and the town of Halych has become as any other small Polish towns.

According to the declaration of the Cabinet of Ministers of Ukraine of 8 February 1994, and the Presidential Order of 11 October 1994, the National preserve Ancient Halych was created in place of the old Halych (near the village of Krylos). The preserve includes numerous churches, a system of defense structures, and various other historical artifacts of the ancient Ruthenian capital.

== Administrative organization ==
Halych was the administrative center of the raion.

The raion had a single urban-type settlement of Bilshivtsi that was established in 1940 after the annexation of the former Polish territory to the Soviet Union. The village of Slobidka Bilshivetska was subordinated directly to the settlement.

The rest of settlements were rural and amount to 68 that were arranged into 38 rural municipalities (or communes for disambiguation purpose) that were governed by rural councils.

- Blyudnyky (Hannivtsi, Kurypiv, Pukasivtsi, Temyrivtsi)
- Bovshiv
- Bryn
- Vysochanka
- Viktoriv
- Deliyeve (Byshiv)
- Demeshkivtsi (Nimshyn, Poplavnyky, Prydnistrovia)
- Demianiv
- Dytyatyn (Naberezhne, Khokhoniv)
- Dorohiv (Kolodiiv)
- Dubivtsi
- Zhalybory
- Zadnistryanske
- Zalukva (Shevchenkove)
- Kinashiv
- Kinchaky (Kremydiv, Ozertse, Sadky)
- Komariv (Sokil)
- Korostovychi (Kuropatnyky)
- Krylos
- Kukilnyky (Zahiria-Kukilnytske)
- Kuriv
- Lany
- Mariyampil (Vodnyky)
- Medynya
- Medukha (Voronytsia)
- Mezhyhirtsi
- Nahraivka
- Nastashyne (Kunychi)
- Novi Skomorokhy (Stari Skomorokhy, Pidshumlyantsi)
- Ozeryany (Sloboda)
- Pelivtsi (Subotiv, Ostriv)
- Podillya
- Sapohiv
- Stary Martyniv (Rizdvyany)
- Tenetnyky (Novy Martyniv)
- Tumyr
- Tustan
- Yabluniv

The population of the whole raion was 65,640 with only 23,842 considered to be living in urban areas.

The major river that flowed through the raion is the Dniester.

== Location ==
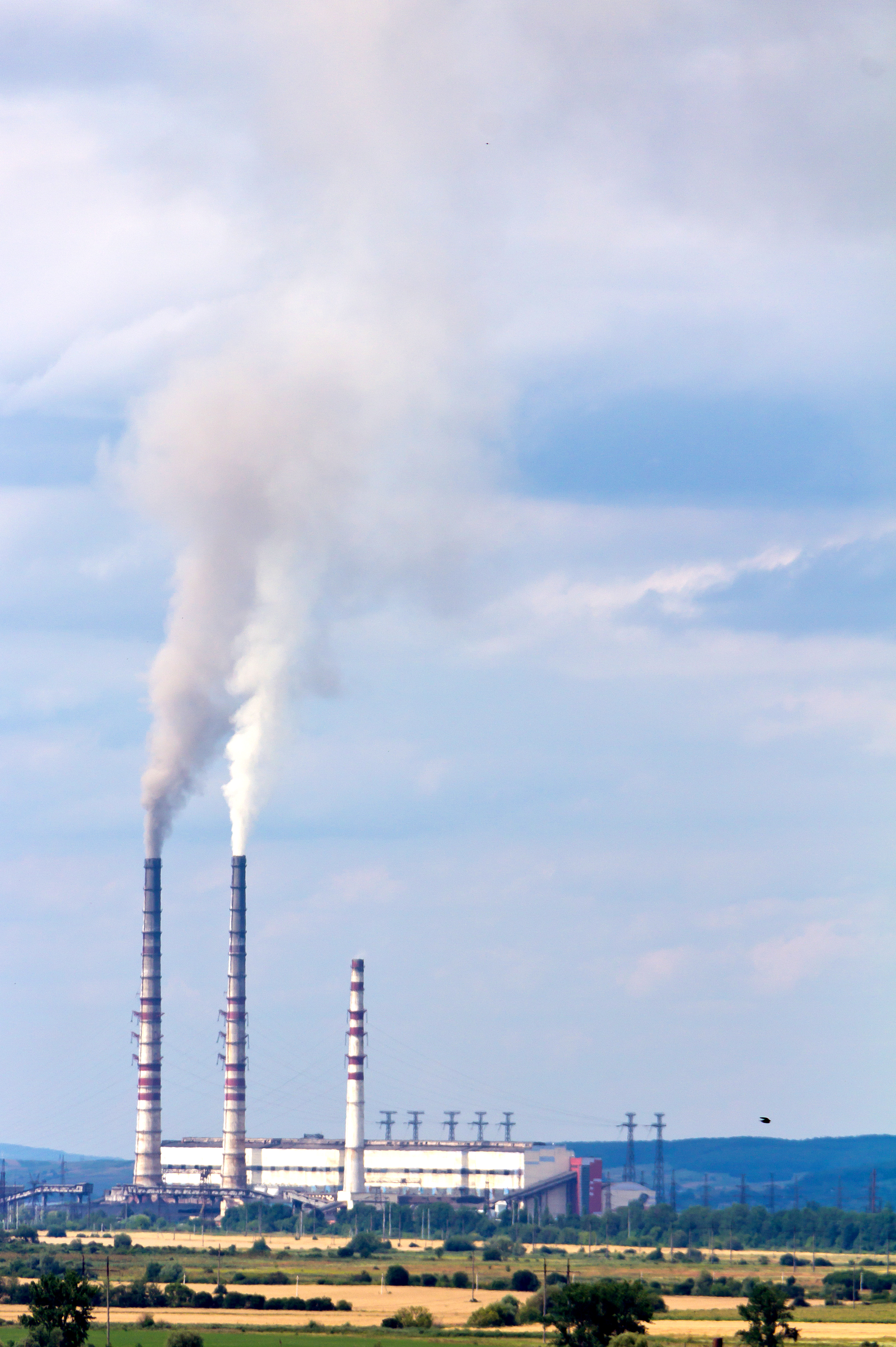
Chimneys of Burshtyn coal-fired power station

The Raion was located in the north of the Ivano-Frankivsk Oblast. It bordered with Tysmenytsia Raion in the south, Kalush Raion to the west, north of it there was Rohatyn Raion, and east of the Halych Raion laid Ternopil Oblast.

The major water supply for the raion was provided by the Dniester River.

== Prominent people ==
- Denys Sichynsky (1865–1909), a composer and a conductor of Halychyna.
- Lavrentiy Zyzaniy (XVI - XVII), a pedagogue, writer, church activist.
