= Dubivtsi =

Dubivtsi (Ukrainian: Дубівці) may refer to the following places in Ukraine:

- Dubivtsi, Chernivtsi Oblast, village in Chernivtsi Raion, Chernivtsi Oblast
- Dubivtsi, Ivano-Frankivsk Oblast, village in Ivano-Frankivsk Raion, Ivano-Frankivsk Oblast
- Dubivtsi, Ternopil Oblast, village in Ternopil Raion, Ternopil Oblast
