= Bohdan Blazhkevych =

Ukrainian scientist (1912–1986)

- Богдан Іванович Блажкевич
- Born: Bohdan Ivanovych Blazhkevych; 28 August 1912; Subotiv, Austria-Hungary (now Ukraine)
- Died: 10 October 1986 (aged 74); Lviv
- Education: Lviv Polytechnic Institute

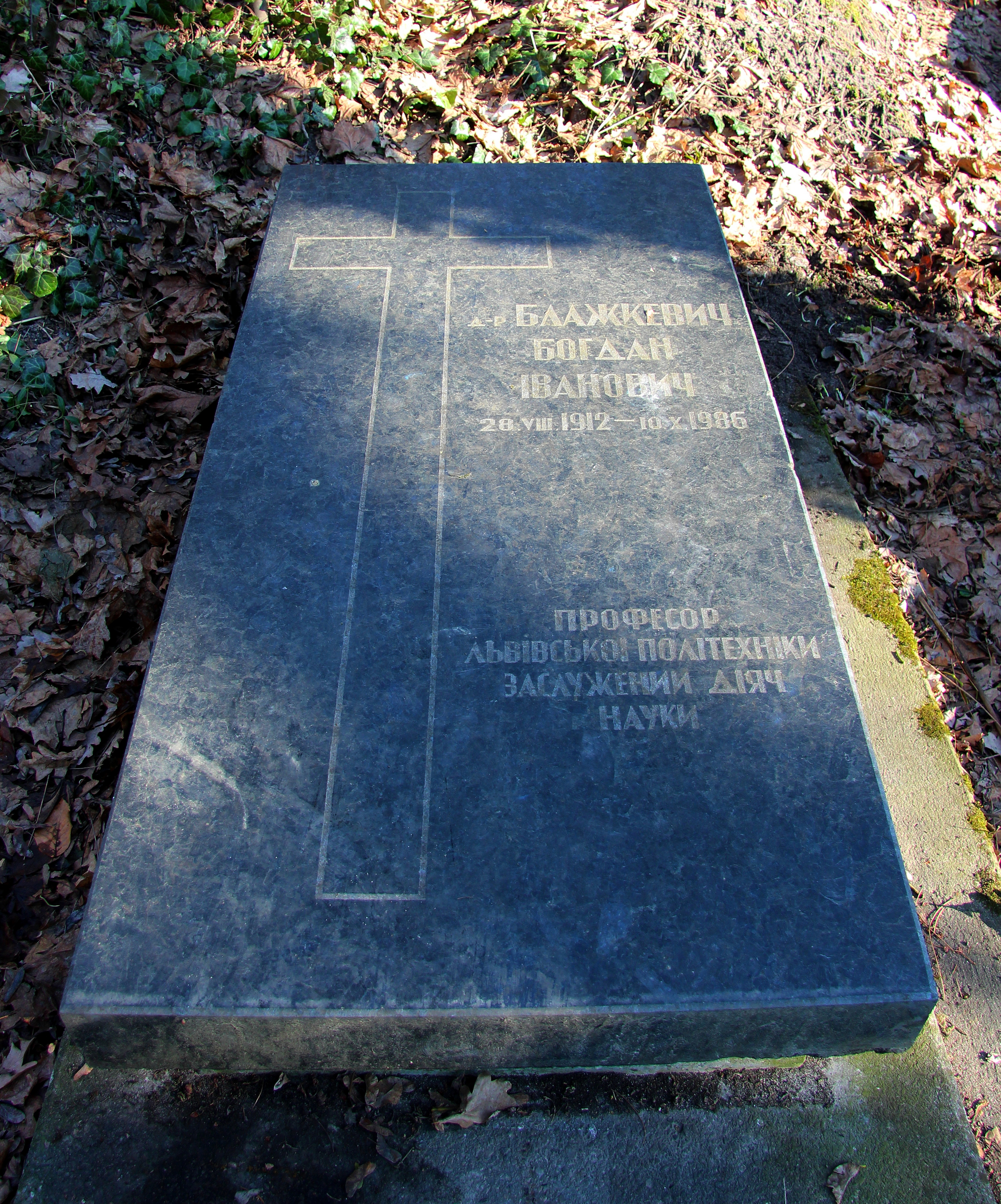
Grave of Bohdan Blazhkevych

Bohdan Blazhkevych (Ukrainian: Богдан Іванович Блажкевич; 28 August 1912 – 10 October 1986) was a Ukrainian scientist in the field of theoretical electrical engineering, co-founder of the scientific field of physicometry. Doctor of Technical Sciences (1965), Professor (1965). Honored Worker of Science of the Ukrainian SSR (1976).

== Biography ==
Bohdan Blazhkevych was born on 28 August 1912 in Subotiv, now part of the Halych urban hromada in Ivano-Frankivsk Raion, Ivano-Frankivsk Oblast, Ukraine.

Studied at the Ternopil Gymnasium, graduated from the Mechanical Faculty of the Lviv Polytechnic Institute (1939). From then on, he worked at his alma mater as a lecturer, senior lecturer (1944), docent (1953), and professor (1965) at the Department of Theoretical Foundations of Electrical Engineering.

Later, he worked in the management of the Lviv Electricity Networks Trust (1941–1944); as a senior researcher (from 1954, part-time), head of the Department of Electrical Circuit Theory (1959–1984) and senior researcher-consultant (1984–1986) at the Karpenko Physico-Mechanical Institute in Lviv.

He died on 10 October 1986 in Lviv, buried on field 34 of the Lychakiv Cemetery.

=== Family ===
Son of Ivanna Blazhkevych, father of Khrystyna Chaplin.

== Achievements ==
Author of more than 200 scientific papers, 6 monographs, 50 copyright certificates.

Research interests: problems of electrical circuit analysis, space instrumentation in Ukraine.
