= Mariiampil =

Rural locality in Ivano-Frankivsk Oblast, Ukraine

Mariiampil Маріямпіль
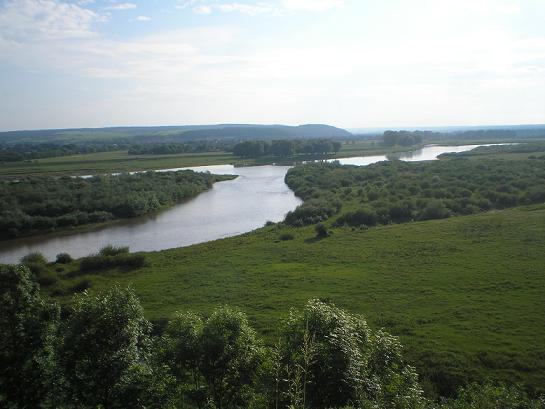
- View of the Dnister from Mariiampil

- Flag Coat of arms
- Interactive map of Mariiampil
- Location of Mariiampil Mariiampil (Ukraine)
- Coordinates: 49°2′N 24°51′E
- Country: Ukraine
- Oblast: Ivano-Frankivsk
- Raion: Ivano-Frankivsk Raion
- Founded: 1378
- City rights: c. 1720s

Area
  - Total: 27.44 km^{2} (10.59 sq mi)

Population (2004)
  - Total: <1,000
  - Density: 40/km^{2} (100/sq mi)
- Postal code: 77181
- Dialling code: +380 3431

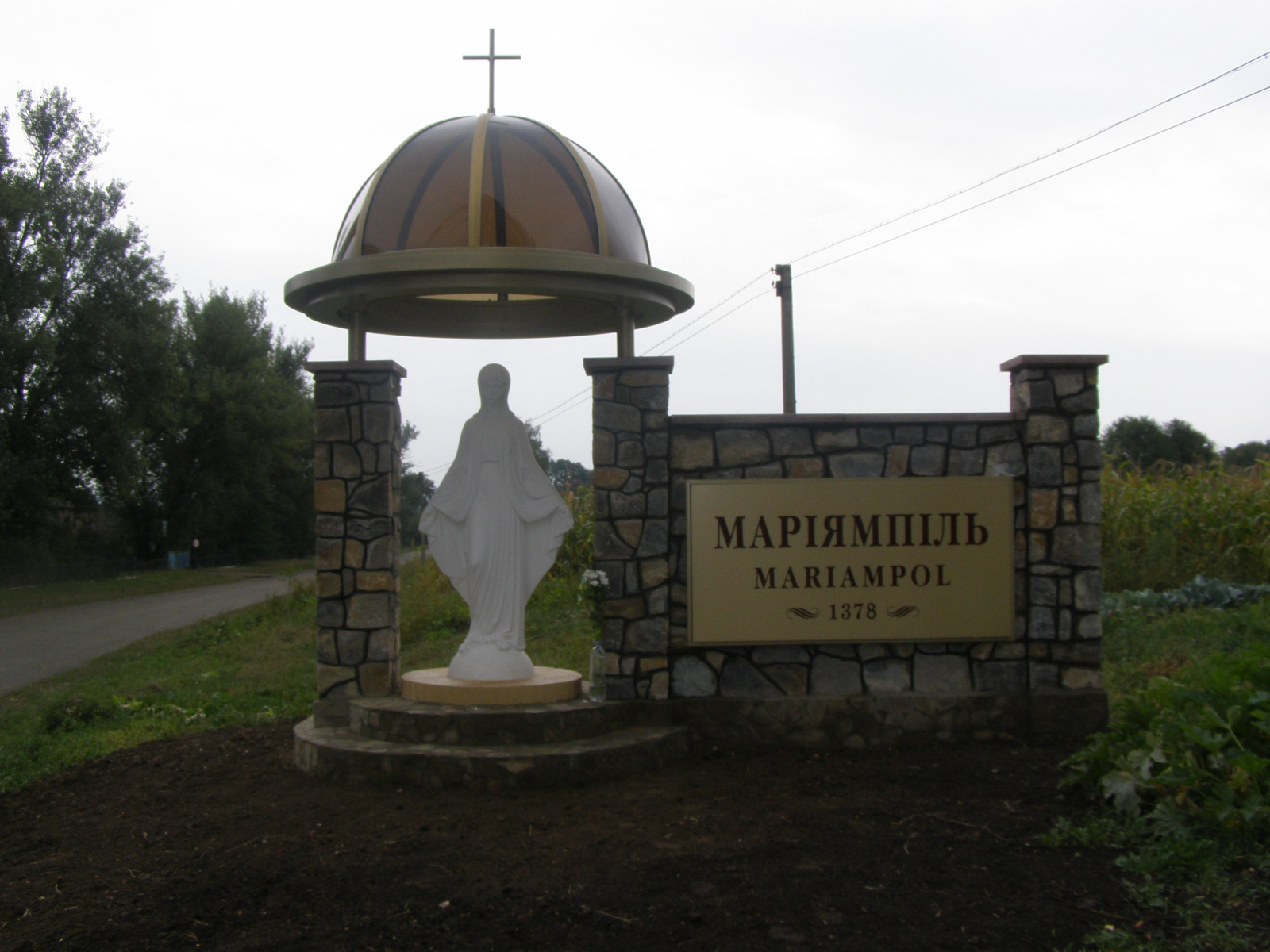
Welcome sign

Mariiampil (Ukrainian: Маріямпіль), or formerly Marynopil (Ukrainian: Маринопіль) is a village (a former township) in Ivano-Frankivsk Raion of Ivano-Frankivsk Oblast (province) on the left bank of the Dnister. Mariiampil belongs to Dubivtsi rural hromada, one of the hromadas of Ukraine.

== Etymology of the town's name ==
The name derives from the Christian name Mary. Based on the folk legend (from the book "Культурні грона Дністра", Kul'turni groda Dnistra), during the time of the Tatar raids, the Polish leader (wojewoda), Jan Kajetan Jabłonowski was fleeing the Tatars on his horse. Having crossed the Dnister, this horse could not jump onto the bank. Despairing of being caught by the Tatars, Kaietan yelled "Jesus-Maryja" and the horse carried him to dry land. In thanks giving to God, Jan Kajetan founded on the either bank of the river, the cities of Jesupol, in honour of Jesus and Marijampol, in honour of Mary, the Mother of God.

Most researchers believe that this settlement was named by the hetman of the Polish–Lithuanian Commonwealth Stanisław Jan Jabłonowski. The Polish researcher W. Urban found in the ancient documents of the parish of Marijampil that in 1691, the town of Božyj Vydok was renamed as Marijampol by Stanislaw Jablonowski. This name was chosen since this hetman brought to the town the miraculous icon of "Our Lady of the Knight" ("Рицарської Богоматерi", Rytsars'koi Bohomateri) that had followed him in all his military campaigns, especially his campaign in defence of Vienna in 1683.

Around 1694, the neighbouring town in honour of Jesus was named "Jesupil".

In 1946, after the Western oblasts of Ukraine were reestablished as part of the Soviet Union, Marijampol was renamed Marynopil. In 2003, after a townwide referendum, the town administration decided to return to its historic name of Mariyampil (Ukrainian version of Polish name). In February 2004, this was confirmed by the Verkhovna Rada of Ukraine.

Name variations include Marinopol', Marijampol, Mariyampol', Marynopil, Mar'yampol', and Mar'yampol.

== History ==
Mariyampil is at the same time an ancient and new settlement. It is an ancient town due to the fact that the area has been inhabited since the Palaeolithic era and through the existence of the Kingdom of Galicia. It is a new settlement since its current history only dates from 1691, when on the ruins of the pagan town of Chortopol' (Ukrainian for Devil's Town), the town, with a Christian name of Marijampol, was built.

From the top of the Castle Hill (Zamkova hora), it is possible to see the Dnister valley (Dniester Canyon). The view from the hill breathes of its history about the kings and their (boyars), about the Tatar and their raids, about the religious growth and years of neglect.

Archaeological evidence suggests that the first town was built during the times of Ruthenian Kingdom of the 12th to 13th century. It was founded on the high bend on the Dnister river and, thus, the town was well fortified. It has been suggested that the town was called Chortopil. Based on the folklore tale recorded by I. Drabčuk, the castle was built by either king Danylo of Halych or one of his sons in the 13th as a defensive outpost. According to further legends, since the 13th, in the courtyard of the castle, a deep, 207 ft (63 m) well was built by Tatar captives. This well was forgotten and covered in the 20th century. Unfortunately, historical information about these times is scarce. Obviously, the mysterious Chortopil managed to exist into the 15th century, whereupon it was ruined during one of the Tatar raids.

About half a mile away (500–900 m) from this place along the Dnister, near a Tatar encampment, in the 15th century, the town of Delijiv – Vovchkiv was built. The first historical mention of this settlement can be found in 1404, when the lord of Vovchkiv, a "dibr Vovce" Dobeslav out of Delijiv had to send seven of his subjects to the court in Halych. For the existence of this town from at least 1378, the judicial document, "Acts of the lands and towns," from the middle of the 15th century. In them, a Jan with the surname of Bylinka, who was adjudicated to have the privilege of "Vovce," given to him by the king Wladyslaw Opolczyk (1372–1380) and a document affirming this signed by the Polish king Casimir IV Jagiellon.

In the 16th century, Vovchiv grew tremendously. In 1594, together with its neighboring town of Cheshybisy (today Yezupil) was burned by the Tatars. Beginning in the 1630s, this settlement belonged to the princely (szlachta) family of Theodor-Andrzej Belzecky. In 1638, he helped Vovchiv in obtaining the Magdeburg City Rights. In the 1670, the Polish king John III Sobieski granted the settlement the Magdeburg Rights. The nucleus of the city was the wooden castle called Bozhy Vydok (Heavenly View), that was built by Belezecky on one of the foothills.

The second half of the 17th century was extremely difficult for Galicia: military campaigns, Tatar raids, epidemics, fires, and civil strife. In 1655, the inhabitants of Vovchkiv and neighbouring towns, raided the castle of Jesupol, destroying its gate and taking the treasure of the former szlachta. In two years time, the raids of the renegade Cossack leader Anton Sichlos ruined the towns of Jesupol and Vovchkiv-Bozhy Vydok. The worst came in 1676 when the Ottoman armies with their allies the Crimean Tatar besieged the castle and burnt the town and castle to the ground.

In 1691, the Polish king gave the ruined town of Vovchkiv-Bozhy Vydok to the Krackowian, castellan, hetman Stanislaw Jan Jablonowski (1634–1702) with the privilege of building a fort on this location. It is not known who suggested that the castle be built on a hill of the bend in the river, that made this place an impregnable fort. The fort had four tall towers. There were two entrances to the castle through strong doors and a draw bridge. The walls of the fort were up to 10 ft thick and 15 ft tall. The southern and southeasterly sections of the fort were protected by a large, deep moat. At the foot of the hill, a square market place was built. The first inhabitants were the villagers from the former town of Bozhy Vydok. Later settlers from Masuria settled in Vovchkiv, which was now called Mariyampil.

Due to the work of the Stanislaw Jan Jablonowski, the town not only obtained its name, but also the miraculous icon of Our Lady of Marijampil, the main religious object of this settlement.

The Polish ducal dynasty of Jablonowski ruled Marijampol for almost 190 years and they saw its large growth. On the death in 1702 of Stanislaw Jan Jablonowski, his son, Jan Stanislaw Jablonowski, Ruthenian voivode, a scholar and a writer, inherited the town. Under his supervision, the wooden (Roman Catholic) church of Holy Trinity, which now housed the Icon of the Mother of God, was built.

Around 1703, Marijampol had its own crest, which was used as the town seal. At first, the crest consisted of the Lamentation of Mary over the crucified body of Christ; later, the crest was an icon of the Our Lady with Christ. The field of the crest was blue with the figures in gold. Later, the family crest of the Jablonowski was added as a separate crest. In 1736–1741, the grandson of Stanislaw Jan Jablonowski, Jan Kaietan Jablonowski (1699–1764) set aside money for the construction of a stone church of the Holy Trinity. In 1742, he built in Marijampol, a Capuchin Monastery along with the (Roman Catholic) church of St. Anthony, at first out of wood and later out of stone. The stone buildings were completed by 1757. In 1753, next to the monastery, one of the many centres of higher learning in Galicia was built. At first, it solely consisted of a collegium of classical studies, but later the study of rhetoric was added. In 1746, under the patronage of Therese of Wilgorsly, the wife of Jan Kaietan Jablonowski, a hospital for the poor and a school for princely (szlachta) orphans was built. The Sisters of Mercy of the Order of Charity were in charge of this establishment.

In 1772, the Galician lands became a part of the Austrian empire. In time, Marijampol become the administrative center for the local district. For the next 150 years, a military garrison was stationed in the local castle. The town continued to expand by area and population. In 1775, there were 1,332 inhabitants and 218 buildings in Marijampol. In accordance with the decree of the Austrian king about closing small monastic establishments, the Capuchin monastery was abandoned. Later, the Austrian government gave the monastery to the Sisters of Mercy, and around the church of St. Anthony a Greek-Catholic community developed.

The first mention of churches in Marijampol can be traced to the 1742 founding document of Kaietan Jablonowski to the Capuchins, which mentions that the monastery was to be built next to a "Ruthenian" (Orthodox) church. At the end of the 18th century, there were two churches in Marijampol: the Church of the Exaltation of the Holy Cross in the center of the town and the Church of St. Nicholas. In 1790, the first church was in a state of severe neglect, while the second had burned down. Thus, due to the lack of a religious place for the inhabitants, they petitioned the Austrian king to permit them to build a new church. The authorities gave the inhabitants the church of St. Anthony. The 130-year common use of this church by both the Roman Catholics and Greek-Catholics was the source of many disagreements and legal cases of both courts in Halych and Lviv. To these religious problems, even the emperor and parliament were dragged into. The authorities attempted to be even-handed when dealing with the two sides.

Marijampol played an important role in the Napoleonic Wars. In 1809, a 4,000-strong, pronapoleonic, gathering of Polish partisans under the command of P. Strizewsky gathered in the local fortress. Against them an 8,000-strong Austrian army, consisting of corps under the generals Merfeld, Kesler, and Ederman, could not dislodge the army from the fortress. The Austrian artillery was called in and, in addition to the damage to the surrounding buildings, it managed to cause some damage to the fortress. At the same time, word came to the generals that Napoleon Bonaparte and Francis II had agreed to a peace treaty. Thus, the Polish army left the fortress. In order to avoid a similar repeat, the Austrian government in 1817 decreed that the walls of the fortress be torn down. In the 1820s, the Jablonowski family taking advantage of the large amount of building material that could be obtained from the ruins of the fortress, built in Marijampol a typical, contemporary palace, which has survived to today in ruins.

The European Spring of Nations in 1849 touched the life of Marijampol. A large influence on the socio-political life had the family Zaklynskiy. One of the most notable members was Hnata Onufriyovych Zaklynska (1818–1866), a member of the Greek-Catholic parish of Marijampol at the end of the 1840s. Together with her husband, Joseph Katherine, they organized in the town a reading room, a choir, and a drama group. Another prominent member was Father Vasyl Motiuk (1853–1934), a Greek-Catholic pastor. For 50 years from 1884, he organized a church choir which was well known beyond the confines of the town. Motiuk was the starter of many social organizations, especially the reading club of Prosvita (Enlightenment) in 1899. Based on the plan given by the engineer Volodymyr Sichynsky, the members of the club met in a single-story building that became a meeting place for the drama group, the choir, a store, and a credit union.

In the early 19th century, the town grew economically. It had always been a center for artisan materials, primarily out of wood and stone. The largest artisan shop was a shingle making shop and became well known for its shingles in the Austrian Empire and around the world. During the 1844 International Exhibition in Vienna, it demonstrated its products in public. For the further development of trade in Marijampol, Jablonowski invited Jewish merchants and built a Market Square (bazaar). In 1857, this town was settled by the followers of the Hasidic sect led by rabbi Elisar Gorovuč ben Meshulam Isaac Ga Levi. The Jewish community in Marijampol then experienced a huge increase in numbers.

In 1898, Marijampil had 4,135 inhabitants, of which 2,020 were Roman Catholics, 1,265 Greek-Catholics, and 850 Jewish. Most of the Roman Catholic inhabitants of Marijampol were either the descendants of the Galician szlachta or the descendants of the Mazurian colonists from the former town of Vovchkiv. Until the First World War, the three communities lived in relative peace in Marijampol. However, the worldwide cataclysms of the 20th century heavily touched on the town. During the World War I, due to its location Marjapol was involved in many fights. On 2 September 1914, the town was captured by the Russian Imperial Army. Fierce fighting occurred in Marijampol from 27 February to 4 March 1914. Many inhabitants were evacuated, however, many more were killed in the fighting. A major fire destroyed many of the buildings including the palace. The Russian Army was unable to defend against the fierce Austrian counterattack and the town was retaken by the Austrian assault on 2 July 1915. The Russian Army returned for the second time in June 1916. In July 1920, the front-lines between the Bolsheviks and the forces loyal to Symon Petliura met around Marijampil. During this time, the commander of the Ukrainian Army, Chief-Otaman Symon Petliura visited Marijampol. From 3 March through 15, 1920 the town and the left bank of the Dnister river were controlled by the 1st Cavalry Army of Budyonny.

At the same time, the Ukrainian and Polish communities of Marijampol were growing to become radicalized. Many youths from Marijampol joined the Ukrainian Sich Riflemen and the Ukrainian Galician Army. During the short-term government of the Western Ukrainian Republic, the Ukrainian youth took control of the town from the Poles. On 9 June 1919, during the Liturgy in the monastery church that had been shared for the last 130 years between the Roman Catholics and Greek-Catholics, 40 Polish soldiers entered the church started to destroy books, steal the valuables, and assault the parishioners. After the battles of Polish-Ukrainian War and the annexation of Galicia the Second Polish Republic under the Treaty of Riga, the Ukrainian found themselves under a brutal Polish regime.

On 26 September 1924, the leaders of the Stanislawow voivodeship forced the Greek-Catholics to abandon the church by 1 January 1926. Given the hardships of post-World War I Poland, it was impossible to build a new church. Thus, the Sister Servants and the Roman Catholic parish pastor, Father Maricin Bosak emptied the church of the Greek-Catholics icons and objects. From 5 January 1926, a day before Christmas, the church was closed to Ukrainians. Soon thereafter, the wooden bell tower was destroyed as well. One of the most important figures in the interwar period in Marijampol was the Roman Catholic pastor Marcin Bosak (1889–1941), who arrived in this town in 1920, and immediately took an interest in the cultural growth of the Polish community. He not only improved their spiritual life, but also their economic status. Under his initiative, the shingle factory, the city's cultural center, the three-story school, new sewers, sidewalks, and the new Roman Catholic Church were built. Furthermore, he organized several Polish organizations.

With the help of the Stanislawow (Greek-Catholic) bishop, Reverend Gregory Khomyshyn, in 1930, in Marijampol, a new Greek-Catholic Church of the Exaltation of the Holy Cross was built and consecrated. The Ukrainian reading hall of Prosvita was re-opened in 1927. In its halls were headquartered the Milkmen Association (Molocarska spilka), the store "Village Host" (Silskiy hospodar), Agrarian school (Khliborobska byshkil), the "Self-help" co-operative (Vlasna pomic), a patriotic organization Sokol, and other numerous organizations such as a library and a child daycare (ran by the sisters of Father Vasyl Motiuk, Stephania and Olha). From 1935, an underground station of the Organization of Ukrainian Nationalists (OUN) was headquartered in Marijampol.

The most tragic years for Marijampol were in 1939–1950 and especially after the Soviet invasion in 1939. Twenty Polish and all religiously active families were deported to Siberia. On 19 December 1940, the German Gestapo roaming through the countryside of western Ukraine before Operation Barbarossa shot 12 members of the OUN. During the night of 23/24 September, OUN members killed the Roman Catholic pastor Father Marcin Bosak.

During the years of the German occupation, all the Jews of Marijampol were sent to a ghetto and later killed in an unknown place. The Jewish cemetery, which had its first burial in 173, was completely ruined by the Germans; with the headstones being used to pave sidewalks.

Upon the return of the Soviet army, a garrison of NKVD soldiers was stationed in the Castle hill. Agents of this new government created a Polish organization that took part in the burning of the neighboring Ukrainian town of Tumyr, where a division of the Ukrainian Insurgent Army (UPA) was based. Vovchkiv, by the end of war was the base for a division of the Polish Armia Krajowa of the Prykarpattia, which as revenge for the burning of Tumyr, was burned by the UPA during the night of 29/30 March 1944. Almost 60 people were killed in Vovchkiv. The ethnic hostilities continued after the end of World War II. On Good Friday of 1947, agents of the NKVD arrested Father Honchar, who had refused to renounce the Greek Catholic Church.

During the population exchange of Poles and Ukrainians in 1945–1952, most of the Poles in Marynopil were sent to Wrocław and Opole in Poland, while the Ukrainians from the San region and the land of Lemkos in Poland replaced the evacuated Poles.

In September 1949, in the Dibrova Forest near Marynopil, the UPA leader Saner was killed by the Soviet agents. As a result, a new group of families from Marynopil were sent to Siberia.

After the fall of the Communist regime, Polish-Ukrainian ties in Marynopil were renewed. Each year, both communities exchange visits between Mariyampil and Wrocław.

Until 18 July 2020, Mariiampil belonged to Halych Raion. The raion was abolished in July 2020 as part of the administrative reform of Ukraine, which reduced the number of raions of Ivano-Frankivsk Oblast to six. The area of Halych Raion was merged into Ivano-Frankivsk Raion.

== Miraculous Icon of the Our Lady of Marijampil ==
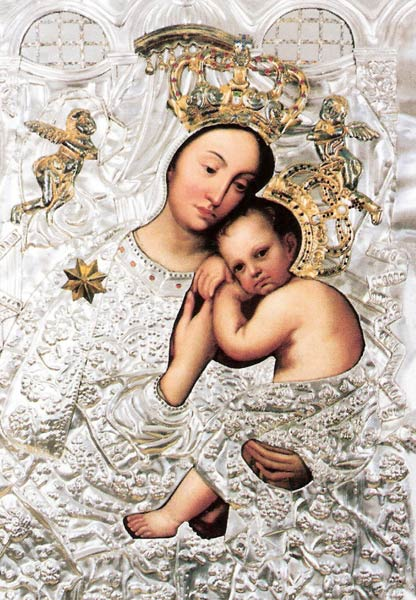
Miraculous Icon of the Our Lady of Marijampil

The main symbol of Marijampil, from its very first beginnings, has been the painted cloth containing an image of Our Lady. Since it was brought to this town by its founder Stanisław Jan Jabłonowski, the icon has guarded the inhabitants of Marijampil from misfortunates and fortified them against evil.

Many researchers think that the beginnings of this icon date to the 16th century, and whose painter was influenced by the work of the painter Raphael Santi. Other believe that an earlier date is possible for this icon. In fact, H. H. Hoffman believes that this icon was painted by Byzantine masters.

This icon was placed in the field chapel of the royal hetman Stanisław Jan Jabłonowski during his battle at Chotin (1673), Zurawny (1676), and the Siege of Vienna in 1683, as well as his countless campaigns in the Volyn, Podilia, and Bukovina regions. It was believed by the soldiers of Jablonowski that this icon gave them victory and thus it came to be known as the "Hetman," "Knightly," or "Victorious" icon of Our Lady.

After Jabłonowski's wars, the icon was placed in his new castle in Marijampil. The image of Our Lady with the Infant Jesus was placed on the coat-of-arms of the city. The grandson of the hetman, Jan Kajetan Jablonowski, in 1721, placed the icon in the newly built wooden church of the Holy Trinity. In 1733, the icon was noted to weep, which led the inhabitants of Marijampil to build a new stone church.

The icon not only attracted soldiers, but also the inhabitants, by its powers. In time, healings of the sick, cleansing of the sinned, and conversion of the pagans were attributed to the icon. The icon was declared officially miraculous in 1737. The news of this icon travelled all over Europe due to the praise given by printers, writers, and polemists. The wife of Jan Kaietan Jablonowski, Theresa from Wilgorska created for the icon a silver crown and gown. In 1752–1788, the priest Wojec Bilinsky donated silver and gems to the icon. The miraculous nature of the icon is catalogued in W. Urban's work "The icon of the Mother of God of Marijampil in Wrocław" (Wrocław, 1981, in Polish). In 1936, the icon was restored by the Lvivsky artist Jurii Janiš.

During the postwar population exchange, the icon was saved by the Polish community from the hands of the atheistic communists and brought to Poland. At first the icon was placed in the church in Glubczuc, where it was restored by Marian Pacyn. At the start of the 1950s, the icon was transferred to Wrocław to the church of the Sisters of Nazareth. In 1965, four Polish bishops, including the future Pope, but then Archbishop of Kraków, John Paul II, festivally transferred the "Knightly Icon of Our Lady" to the newly built, 13-storey church on Piasek in Wrocław. Sometime in the next 20 years, a thief stole the silver crown. A new coronation was performed on 10 September in the presence of the Primate of Poland Józef Glemp.

In the 1990s, a copy of the miraculous Icon of the Marijampilian Mother of God was given by the Polish Marijampilians to the Ukrainian inhabitants of Marijampil. It was placed in a side altar of the Church of the Exaltation of the Holy Cross.

== Historical and religious monuments ==
- Miraculous Icon of the Mother of God from 16th century (a copy)
- Ruins of the castle, palace, fortress from the end of the 17th century
- Former Capuchin monastery of the 18th century (after the Second World War, it was used as child centre, a medical centre, and currently it is used as prison).
- The Church of the Exaltation of the Holy Cross: built in 1930 and now shared by both the Greek-Catholic and Ukrainian Orthodox-Kievan Patriarchate members.
- Spring with miraculous and healing waters, especially for those suffering from ailments to the eyes and head. According to local lore, it is the location of an apparition of Our Lady.
