= Bryn, Ukraine =

Rural locality in Ivano-Frankivsk Oblast, Ukraine

Bryn Бринь
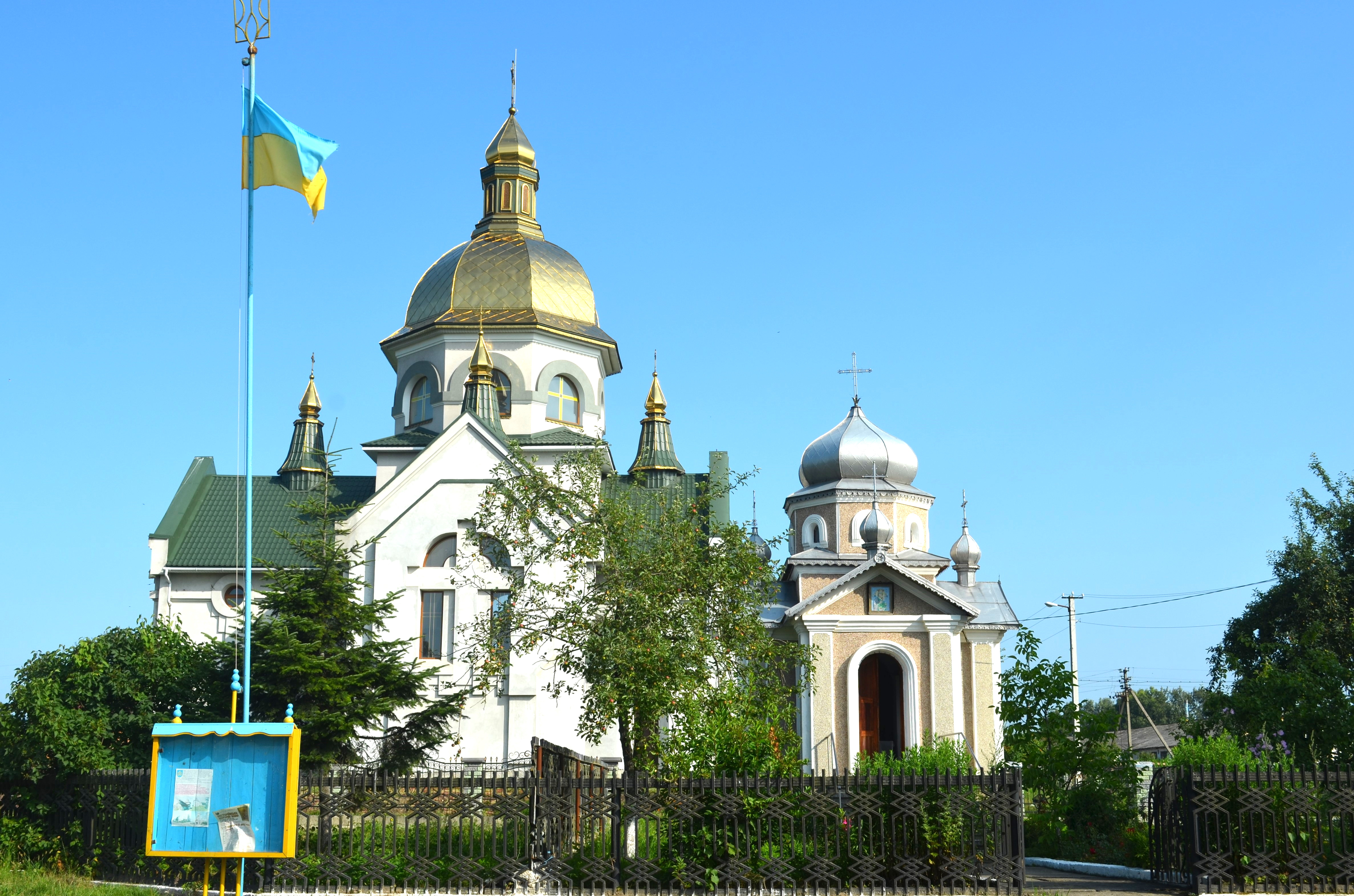
- Village church in Bryn

- Ukraine Ivano-Frankivsk Oblast
- Coordinates: 49°02′58″N 24°34′09″E
- Country: Ukraine
- Oblast: Ivano-Frankivsk Oblast
- District: Ivano-Frankivsk Raion

Area
  - Total: 11.3 km^{2} (4.4 sq mi)
- Elevation: 305 m (1,001 ft)

Population
  - Total: 706
  - Density: 62.5/km^{2} (162/sq mi)
- Time zone: UTC+2 (EET)
  - Summer (DST): UTC+3 (EEST)
- Postal code: 77165
- Area code: +380 3431
- Website: селище Бринь райцентр Галич облцентр Івано-Франківськ ^{(Ukrainian)}

Bryn (Ukrainian: Бринь) is a village in Ivano-Frankivsk Raion of Ivano-Frankivsk Oblast in Western Ukraine. It belongs to Halych urban hromada, one of the hromadas of Ukraine. The population of the village is about 706 people and the local government is administered by Brynska village council.

== Geography ==
The village occupies 11.3 square kilometres (4.4 sq mi) at an altitude of 30 metres (98 ft) above sea level and is located on the left bank of the Lukva River. It is at a distance 22 kilometres (14 mi) from the regional center of Ivano-Frankivsk, 17 kilometres (11 mi) from the district center Halych, and 20 kilometres (12 mi) from Kalush.

== History and attractions ==
The first written record of the village dates from 1555. However, several burial places of the Carpathian Kurgan culture (4th–5th centuries) and a Kievan Rus' mound have been found in the village territory. The village preserves the wooden Church of the Transfiguration of the Blessed St. Nicholas that was built in 1863.

Until 18 July 2020, Bryn belonged to Halych Raion. The raion was abolished in July 2020 as part of the administrative reform of Ukraine, which reduced the number of raions of Ivano-Frankivsk Oblast to six. The area of Halych Raion was merged into Ivano-Frankivsk Raion.

== Famous people ==
Joseph Nyzhankivsky (1836–1911), the father of Ostap Nyzhankivsky, is buried in the village.
