= Medukha =

Medukha may refer to these terms in Ukraine.

- Medukha, Ukraine - village in Ivano-Frankivsk Oblast
- Medukha - is a Ukrainian honey-based alcoholic beverage.
