= Roman Serbyn =

Ukrainian-Canadian historian

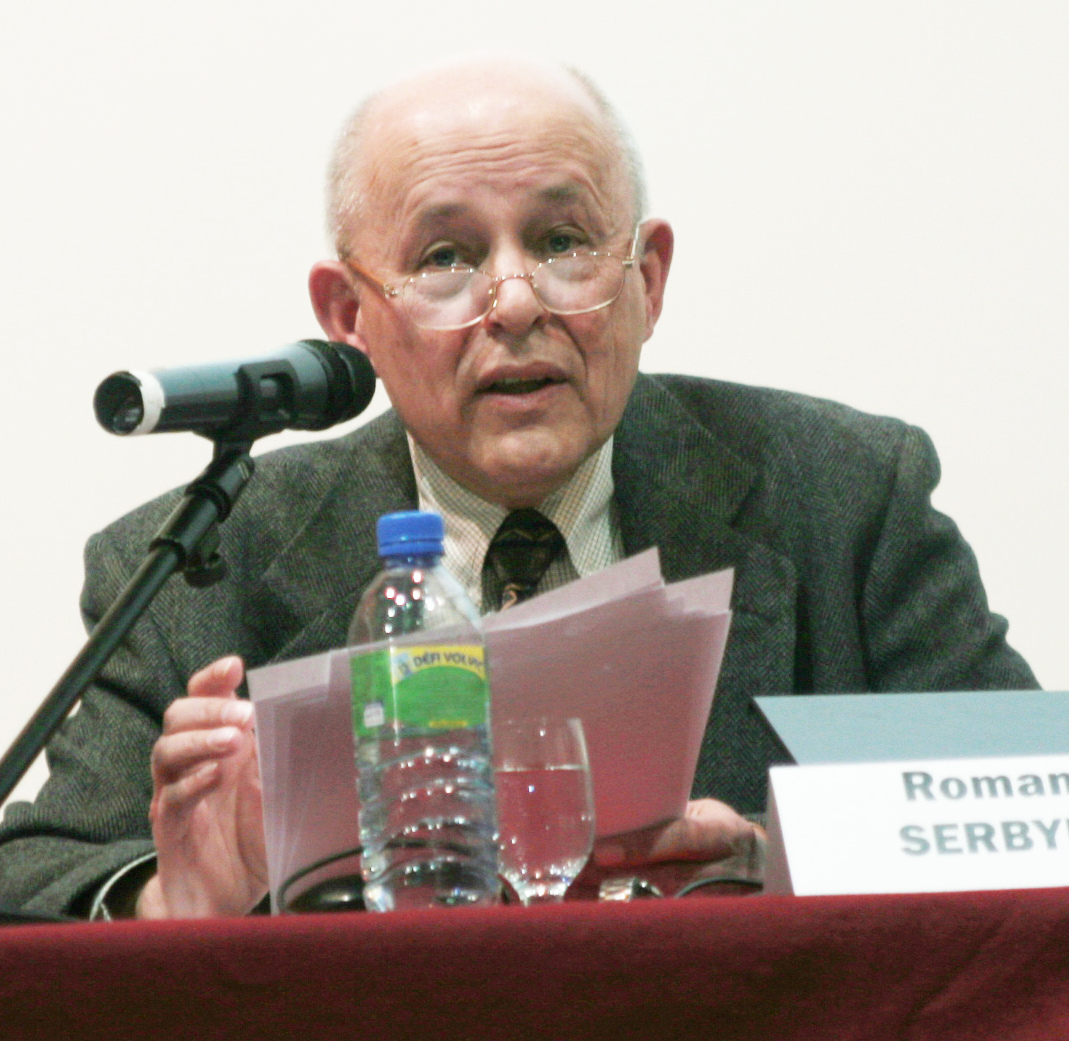
Roman Serbyn in 2009

Roman Serbyn (born 21 March 1939) is an historian, and a professor emeritus of Russian and East European history at the University of Quebec at Montreal, and an expert on Ukraine. He currently resides in Montreal, Canada.

Serbyn is well known for his books and many articles about Ukrainian history, particularly the Holodomor.

== Biography ==
Roman Serbyn was born in Viktoriv, Ukraine, in 1939. In 1948, he, along with his family, moved to Montreal, Canada. In 1960, he obtained a Bachelor of Arts from McGill University, and completed his Ph.D. at McGill in 1975. Serbyn began teaching history at McGill in 1969. He retired in 2002.

== Publications ==
- Roman Serbyn and Bohdan Krawchenko, Famine in Ukraine 1932-1933, 1986, ISBN 0-920862-43-8.
- Roman Serbyn, Holod 1921-1923 I Ukrainska Presa V Kanadi (translation: The Famine of 1921-1923 and the Ukrainian Press in Canada), 1992, ISBN 0-9696301-0-7
