= Hannusivka =

Rural locality in Ivano-Frankivsk Oblast, Ukraine

Hannusivka Ганнусівка
- Village
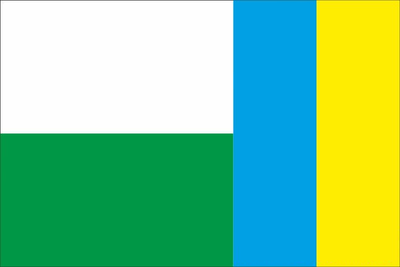
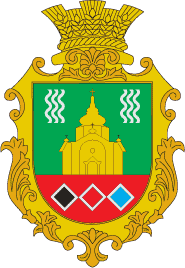
- Flag Coat of arms

- Location within Ukraine
- Coordinates: 49°0′16″N 24°48′17″E
- Country: Ukraine
- Oblast: Ivano-Frankivsk
- Raion: Ivano-Frankivsk Raion

Area
  - Total: 10.79 km^{2} (4.17 sq mi)

Population
  - Total: 1,263

Hannusivka (Ukrainian: Ганнусівка) is a village (selo) in western Ukraine. It is located in the Ivano-Frankivsk Raion (district) of Ivano-Frankivsk Oblast (province). It belongs to Yezupil settlement hromada, one of the hromadas of Ukraine.

Hannusivka is a local government area with a rural council.

Until 18 July 2020, Hannusivka belonged to Tysmenytsia Raion. The raion was abolished in July 2020 as part of the administrative reform of Ukraine, which reduced the number of raions of Ivano-Frankivsk Oblast to six. The area of Tysmenytsia Raion was merged into Ivano-Frankivsk Raion.
