= Bilshivtsi =

Rural locality in Ivano-Frankivsk Oblast, Ukraine

Bilshivtsi Більшівці Bołszowce
- Rural settlement
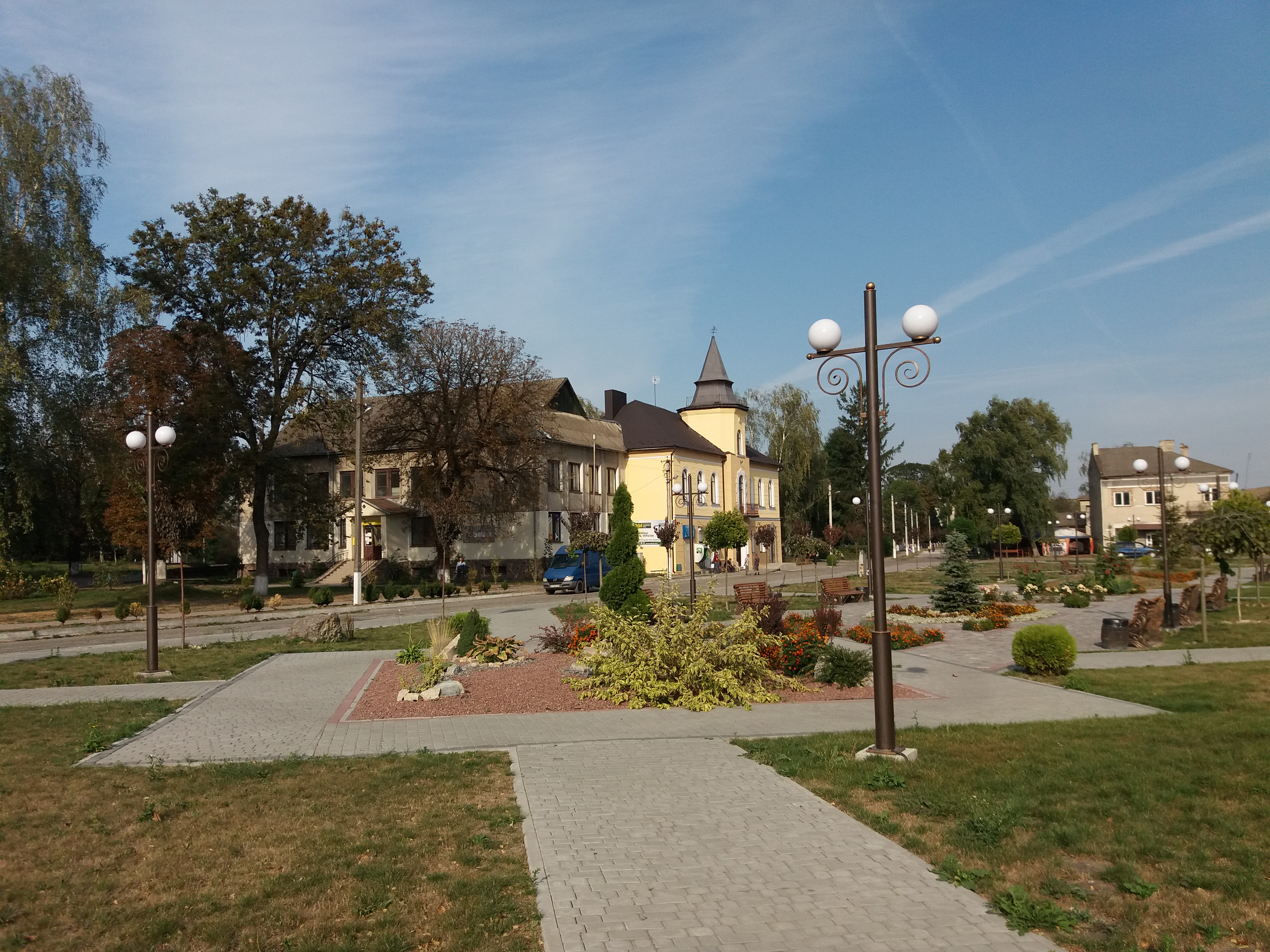
- Main square in the village

- Coat of arms

- Location within Ivano-Frankivsk Oblast Location within Ukraine
- Coordinates: 49°11′8″N 24°44′47″E
- Country: Ukraine
- Oblast: Ivano-Frankivsk Oblast
- Raion: Ivano-Frankivsk Raion
- Hromada: Bilshivtsi settlement hromada

Government
  - Head of Village Council: V.P. Sanotsky

Area
  - Total: 12.83 km^{2} (4.95 sq mi)

Population (2022)
  - Total: 1,843
  - Density: 143.6/km^{2} (372.0/sq mi)
- Area code: (+380) 3431

Bilshivtsi (Ukrainian: Більшівці; German: Bolschowitz; Polish: Bołszowce) is a rural settlement in Ivano-Frankivsk Raion, Ivano-Frankivsk Oblast, Ukraine. Bilshivtsi hosts the administration of Bilshivtsi settlement hromada, one of the hromadas of Ukraine. Its population was 1,843 (2022 estimate).

== Location ==
Bilshivtsi is located at the confluence of the Narayivka River and the Hnyla Lypa River, a tributary of the Dniester. It is 3 kilometers to the east of the Lviv–Ivano-Frankivsk road and 8 kilometers north of the Halych train station.

== History ==
Between 1772 and 1918 it was part of Austrian Galicia. After the end of World War I Bilshivtsi became part of Rohatyn Powiat in Stanisławów Voivodeship, part of Poland. In 1939 it was annexed by the Soviet Union.

Bilshivtsi was occupied by German troops during World War II from 1941 to 1944. In 1943, more than 1,000 local Jewish residents were shot by German troops.

Until 18 July 2020, Bilshivtsi belonged to Halych Raion. The raion was abolished in July 2020 as part of the administrative reform of Ukraine, which reduced the number of raions of Ivano-Frankivsk Oblast to six. The area of Halych Raion was merged into Ivano-Frankivsk Raion.

Until 26 January 2024, Bilshivtsi was designated urban-type settlement. On this day, a new law entered into force which abolished this status, and Bilshivtsi became a rural settlement.
