= Subotiv, Ivano-Frankivsk Oblast =

Rural locality in Ivano-Frankivsk Oblast, Ukraine

Subotiv Суботів
- Location in Ivano-Frankivsk Oblast
- Coordinates: 49°11′10″N 24°34′32″E
- Country: Ukraine
- Oblast: Ivano-Frankivsk Oblast
- Raion: Ivano-Frankivsk Raion
- Hromada: Halych urban hromada
- Time zone: UTC+2 (EET)
  - Summer (DST): UTC+3 (EEST)
- Postal code: 77151

Subotiv (Ukrainian: Суботів) is a village in Halych urban hromada, Ivano-Frankivsk Raion, Ivano-Frankivsk Oblast, Ukraine.

== History ==
It was mentioned on 24 November 1438 in the protocol of the Galician court.

In the register of churches of the Voinyliv deanery on 4 March 1733, the Church of the Nativity of the Lord is listed in Subotiv, which was no longer new.

== Notable residents ==
- Bohdan Blazhkevych (1912–1986), Ukrainian scientist in the field of theoretical electrical engineering, co-founder of the scientific field of physicometry

== Sources ==
- "Sobotów". Geographical Dictionary of the Kingdom of Poland (in Polish). 10. Warszawa: Kasa im. Józefa Mianowskiego. 1889. p. 956.
