= Yezupil settlement hromada =

Hromada in Ivano-Frankivsk Oblast, Ukraine

Yezupil settlement hromada Єзупільська селищна громада
- hromada
- Location within Ivano-Frankivsk Oblast Location within Ukraine
- Coordinates: 49°02′35″N 24°46′35″E
- Country: Ukraine
- Oblast: Ivano-Frankivsk Oblast
- Raion: Ivano-Frankivsk Raion
- Administrative center: Yezupil

Area
  - Total: 862 km^{2} (333 sq mi)

Population
  - Total: 7,491
- Rural settlement: 1
- Villages: 4
- Website: ezupilska-gromada.gov.ua

Yezupil settlement hromada (Ukrainian: Єзупільська селищна громада) is a hromada in Ukraine, in Ivano-Frankivsk Raion of Ivano-Frankivsk Oblast. The administrative center is the rural settlement of Yezupil.

== Settlements ==
The hromada consists of 1 rural settlement (Yezupil) and 4 villages:

- Hannusivka
- Dovhe
- Poberezhzhia
- Stryhantsi
