= Yezupil =

Rural locality in Ivano-Frankivsk Oblast, Ukraine

Yezupil Єзупіль
- Rural settlement
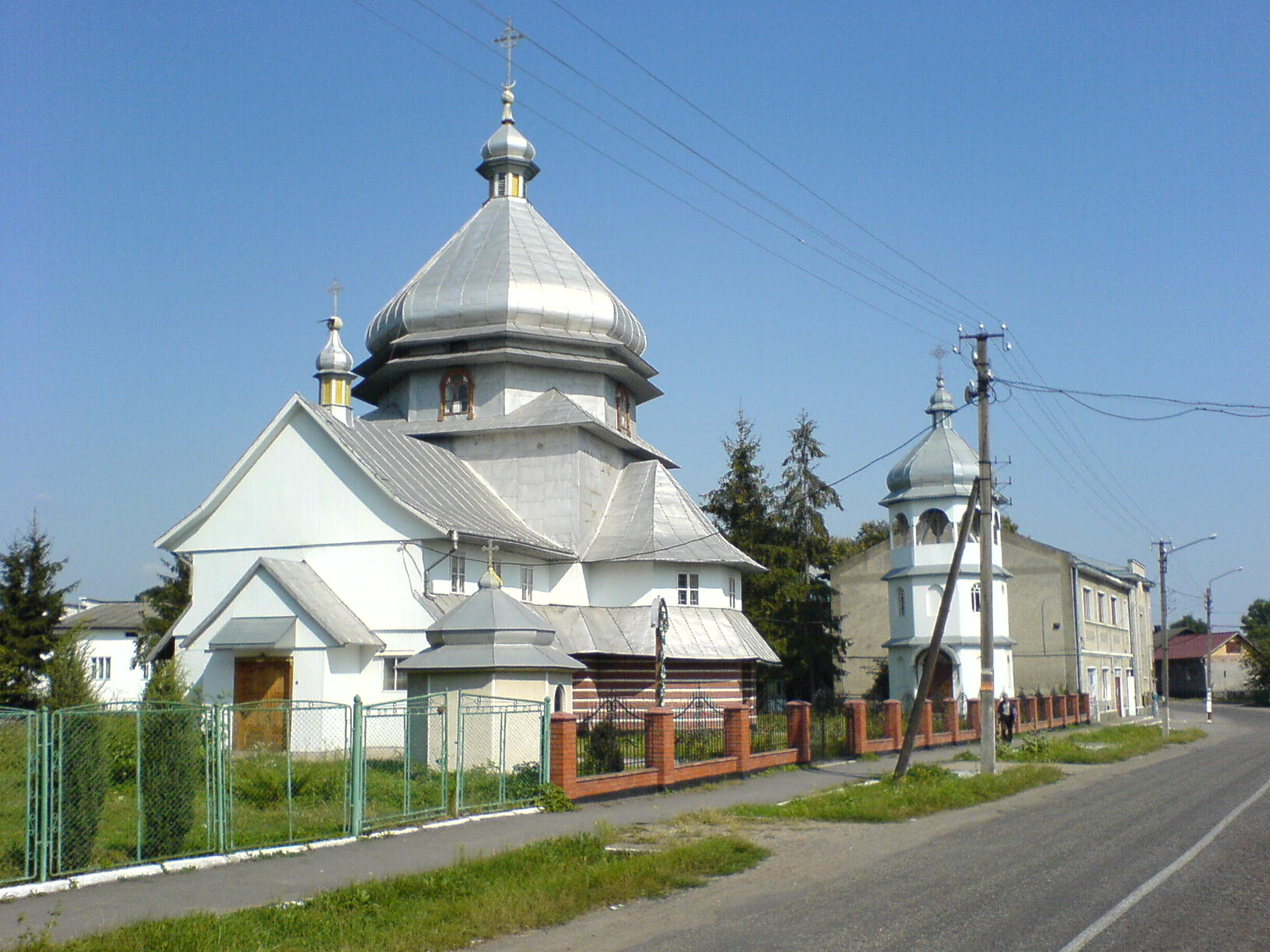
- Yezupil main road

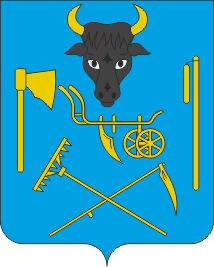
- Coat of arms
- Interactive map of Yezupil
- Location within Ukraine Location within Ivano-Frankivsk Oblast
- Coordinates: 49°02′N 24°47′E
- Country: Ukraine
- Oblast: Ivano-Frankivsk
- Raion: Ivano-Frankivsk Raion
- Founded: 1435
- urban-type settlement: 1940

Government
  - Mayor: Hanna Kushnir

Area
  - Total: 28.220 km^{2} (10.896 sq mi)
- Elevation: 260 m (850 ft)

Population (2022)
  - Total: 2,753
  - Density: 97.55/km^{2} (252.7/sq mi)
- Postal code: 77411
- Area code: +380 3436
- Website: Ukrainian Parliament website

Yezupil (Ukrainian: Єзупіль; Polish: Jezupol) is a rural settlement in western Ukraine. It is located in Ivano-Frankivsk Raion (district) of Ivano-Frankivsk Oblast (region), approximately 14 kilometres (8.7 mi) north of the administrative center of the oblast, Ivano-Frankivsk. Yezupil hosts the administration of Yezupil settlement hromada, one of the hromadas of Ukraine. Population: 2,753 (2022 estimate).

== Geography ==
Yezupil is located upon the Bystrytsia river, not far from its confluence with the Dniester. It lies approximately 7 km from Halych and is a part of the historic region of Pokuttya in Galicia.

== History ==
Remains of Neolithic and Trypillian settlements have been discovered in the area, as well as Roman denarii coins.

Located near Halych, the former capital of the Principality of Halych Volhynia in the 10–12th centuries, the area of modern Yezupil was the site of a Kyivan Rus' settlement. Between 1352–1772 it was a part of Ruthenia Voivodeship in the Kingdom of Poland. First mentioned in 1435 as Cheshybisy (Polish: Czesybiesy), up until the 16th century the settlement was a village with a wooden fortress. When the fort was destroyed during one of the Tatar incursions, Jakub Potocki, the voivode of Wrocław and private owner of the town, renamed it Jesupol, after Jesus in 1597. In 1598, a fortress and Dominican monastery was erected, and the town developed next to it. The monastery had a rich and famous library of ancient scriptures and prints.

Upon the partition of the Polish–Lithuanian Commonwealth in 1772 the Kingdom of Galicia and Lodomeria, or simply Galicia, became the largest, most populous, and northernmost province of the Austrian Empire, where it remained until the dissolution of Austria-Hungary at the end of World War I. At the turn of the 20th century, town Jezupol was a middle-sized town with its own Jewish Kahil, a Roman Catholic Church and a Greek Catholic Church. It belonged to Galicia (Halychyna), a part of Austria-Hungary. Yezupil was part of the Halych county (powiat).

In the prelude to the Second World War, the Molotov–Ribbentrop pact divided Poland roughly along the Curzon line. Thus, all territory east of the San, Bug and Neman rivers were annexed into the Soviet Union, approximating the former territory of East Galicia. This territory was divided into four administrative districts (oblasts): Lviv, Stanislav, Drohobych and Tarnopol (the latter including parts of Volhynia) of the Ukrainian Soviet Socialist Republic. Since September 17, 1939, it was a part of the Soviet Union. Since June 22, 1941, the Soviet regime discontinued when Germany had occupied East Galicia during Operation Barbarossa.

In 1945, the town became a part of the Ukrainian SSR as part of the Soviet Union; since 1991, the town has been a part of Ukraine.Under the Soviet rule Yezupil was renamed to Zhovten (Ukrainian: Жовтень); it received the status of an urban-type settlement in 1940. On July 9, 2003, the town was officially renamed back into Jezupil.

Until 18 July 2020, Yezupil belonged to Tysmenytsia Raion. The raion was abolished in July 2020 as part of the administrative reform of Ukraine, which reduced the number of raions of Ivano-Frankivsk Oblast to six. The area of Tysmenytsia Raion was merged into Ivano-Frankivsk Raion.

Until 26 January 2024, Yezupil was designated urban-type settlement. On this day, a new law entered into force which abolished this status, and Yezupil became a rural settlement.

== Economy ==
Yezupil is a centre of local food industry.

== Notes ==
- Geographic Library of the Kingdom of Poland (Polish language)
