= Viktoriv, Ukraine =

Rural locality in Ivano-Frankivsk Oblast, Ukraine

Viktoriv Вікторів
- Coordinates: 49.050°N 24.628°E
- Country: Ukraine
- Oblast: Ivano-Frankivsk Oblast
- District: Ivano-Frankivsk Raion

Population
  - Total: 1,649

Viktoriv (Ukrainian: Вікторів) is a village in Ivano-Frankivsk Raion, Ivano-Frankivsk Oblast, Ukraine. It belongs to Halych urban hromada, one of the hromadas of Ukraine. The village's population is 1649.

Until 18 July 2020, Viktoriv belonged to Halych Raion. The raion was abolished in July 2020 as part of the administrative reform of Ukraine, which reduced the number of raions of Ivano-Frankivsk Oblast to six. The area of Halych Raion was merged into Ivano-Frankivsk Raion.
