= Medukha, Ukraine =

Rural locality in Ivano-Frankivsk Oblast, Ukraine

Medukha Медуха Meducha
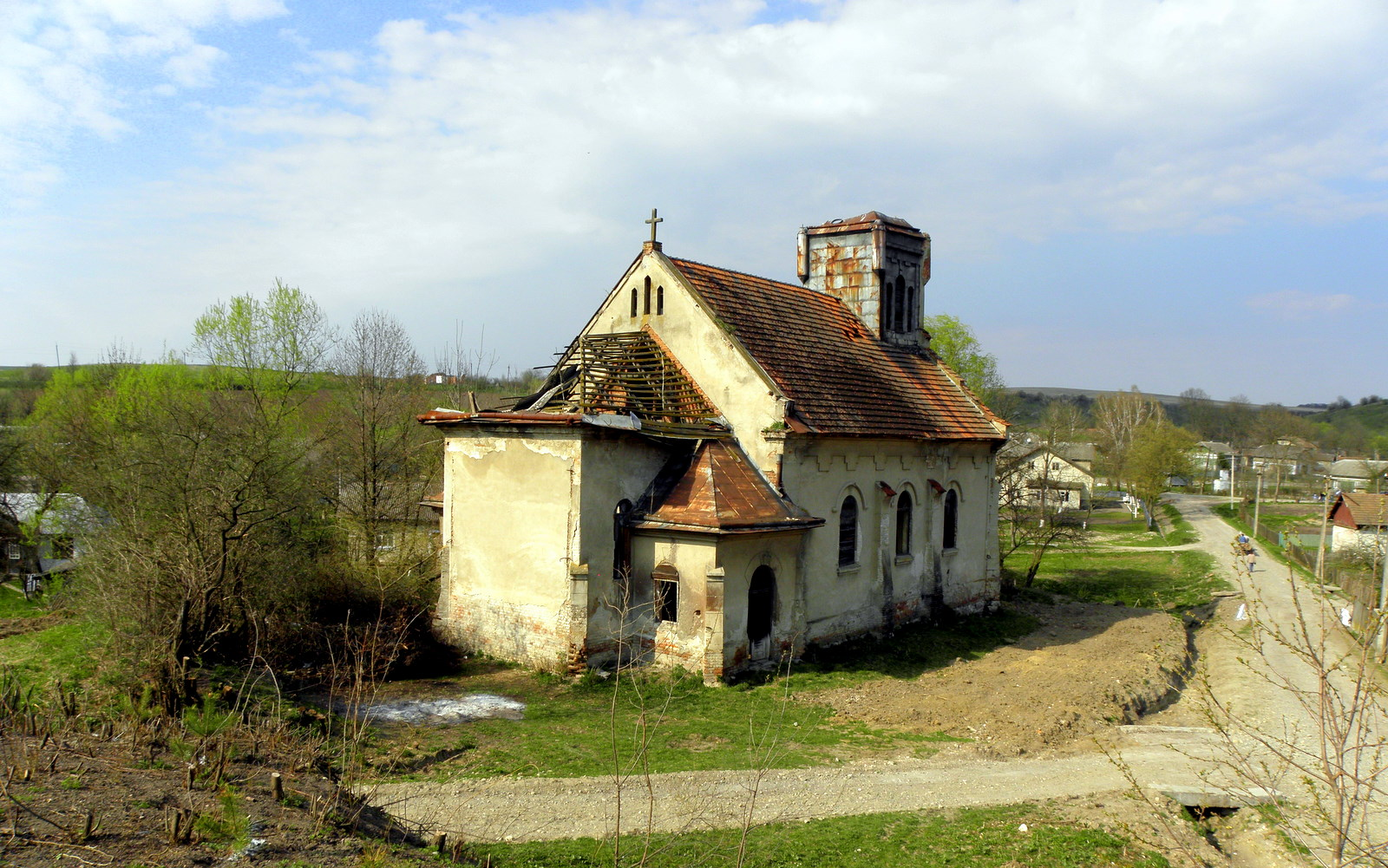
- Ruins of the Church of Our Lady of the Rosary

- Location within Ukraine Location within Ivano-Frankivsk Oblast
- Coordinates: 49°08′56″N 24°48′36″E
- Country: Ukraine
- Oblast: Ivano-Frankivsk
- Raion: Ivano-Frankivsk Raion

Area
  - Total: 17.23 km^{2} (6.65 sq mi)

Population (2001 census)
  - Total: 442
  - Density: 25.65/km^{2} (66.4/sq mi)
- Time zone: UTC+2 (EET)
  - Summer (DST): UTC+3 (EEST)
- Postal code: 77145
- Area code: +380 3431

Medukha (Ukrainian: Медуха, Polish: Meducha) is a village in Ivano-Frankivsk Raion of Ivano-Frankivsk Oblast in western Ukraine. Hnyla Lypa River flows near of the village. Medukha belongs to Dubivtsi rural hromada, one of the hromadas of Ukraine.

== History ==
First written mention comes from the 15th century. Then belonged to the Polish–Lithuanian Commonwealth, from 1772 until 1918 to Austrian (Habsburg monarchy, Austrian Empire, Austria-Hungary) empires, in 1918-1919 to West Ukrainian People's Republic, in 1919-1939 to the Second Polish Republic. Out of its 1,756 dwellers more than 1,200 were Polish. From 1991 belonged to Ukraine.

Reading room of Ukrainian society Prosvita operated in the village. In 1944 Ukrainian nationalists organization OUN-UPA killed 58 Poles there. Other 1,300 were saved by its Catholic priest, Piotr Zaremba, who helped to move the Polish population to Łańcut.

Until 18 July 2020, Medukha belonged to Halych Raion. The raion was abolished in July 2020 as part of the administrative reform of Ukraine, which reduced the number of raions of Ivano-Frankivsk Oblast to six. The area of Halych Raion was merged into Ivano-Frankivsk Raion.

== Attractions ==
- Church
- Roman Catholic church

== People ==
- Dmytro Vitovsky - a Ukrainian politician and military leader, chairman of Ukrainian Military Committee, the first commander of the Ukrainian Galician Army, State Secretary of WUPR

== Sources ==
- (in Polish) Koscioly i klasztory rzymskokatolockie dawnego wojewodztwa ruskiego.— Кrаków, 2002
