= Bilshivtsi settlement hromada =

Hromada in Ivano-Frankivsk Oblast, Ukraine

Bilshivtsi settlement hromada Більшівцівська селищна громада
- hromada
- Location within Ivano-Frankivsk Oblast Location within Ukraine
- Coordinates: 49°11′08″N 24°44′47″E
- Country: Ukraine
- Oblast: Ivano-Frankivsk Oblast
- Raion: Ivano-Frankivsk Raion
- Administrative center: Bilshivtsi

Area
  - Total: 994 km^{2} (384 sq mi)

Population (2018)
  - Total: 6,292
- Rural settlement: 1
- Villages: 15
- Website: bilshivcivskagromada.if.gov.ua

Bilshivtsi settlement hromada (Ukrainian: Більшівцівська селищна громада) is a hromada in Ukraine, in Ivano-Frankivsk Raion of Ivano-Frankivsk Oblast. The administrative center is the rural settlement of Bilshivtsi.

== Settlements ==
The hromada consists of 1 rural settlement (Bilshivtsi) and 15 villages:

- Zhalybory
- Zahiria-Kukilnytske
- Kinashiv
- Kukilnyky
- Kuriv
- Naraivka
- Podillia
- Slobidka Bilshivtsivska
- Yabluniv
- Dytiatyn
- Naberezhne
- Khokhoniv
- Novi Skomorokhy
- Pidshumliantsi
- Stari Skomorokhy
