= Dubivtsi rural hromada =

Hromada in Ivano-Frankivsk Oblast, Ukraine

Dubivtsi rural hromada Дубовецька сільська громада
- hromada
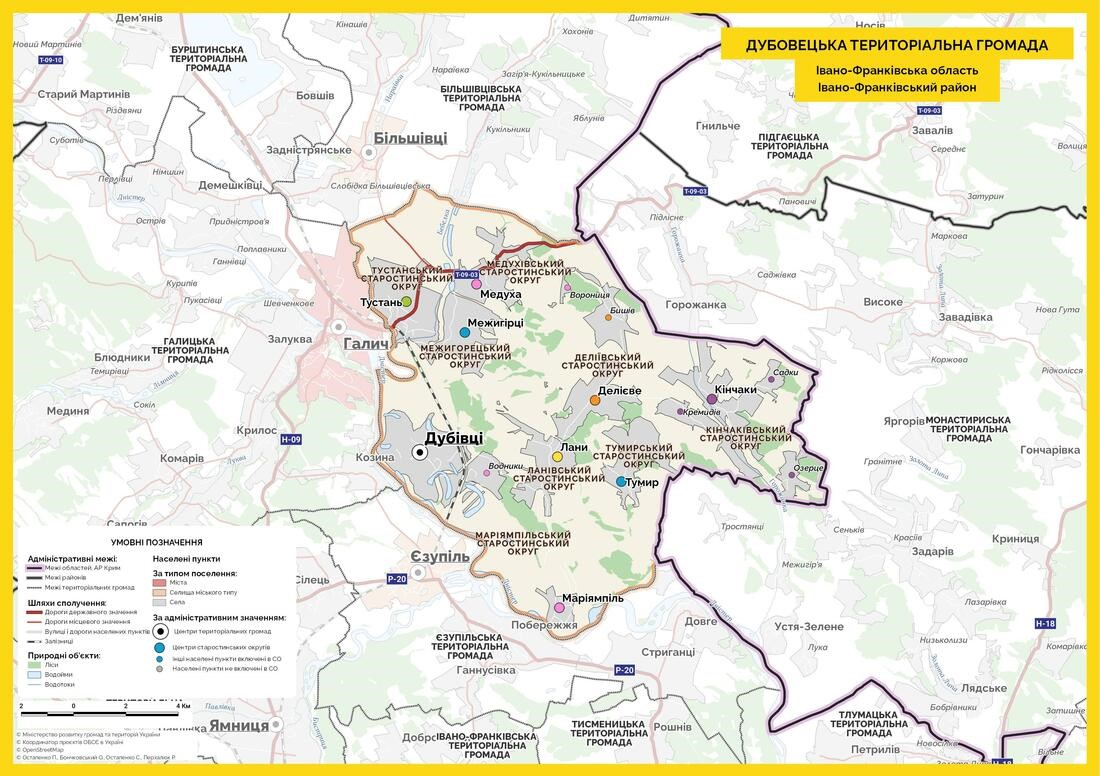
- Dubovetska territorial hromada.
- Country: Ukraine
- Oblast: Ivano-Frankivsk Oblast
- Raion: Ivano-Frankivsk Raion
- Administrative center: Dubivtsi

Area
  - Total: 1,722 km^{2} (665 sq mi)

Population
  - Total: 7,311
- Villages: 15
- Website: dubovecka-gromada.gov.ua

Dubivtsi rural hromada (Ukrainian: Дубовецька сільська громада) is a hromada in Ukraine, in Ivano-Frankivsk Raion of Ivano-Frankivsk Oblast. The administrative center is the village of Dubivtsi.

== Settlements ==
The hromada consists of 15 villages:

- Byshiv
- Vodnyky
- Voronytsia
- Deliive
- Dubivtsi
- Kinchaky
- Kremydiv
- Lany
- Mariiampil
- Medukha
- Mezhyhirtsi
- Ozertse
- Sadky
- Tumyr
- Tustan
