= Halych urban hromada =

Urban hromada in Ivano-Frankivsk Oblast, Ukraine

Halych urban hromada Галицька міська громада
- Hromada
- Seal
- Interactive map of Halych urban hromada
- Country: Ukraine
- Oblast: Ivano-Frankivsk
- Raion: Ivano-Frankivsk

Area
  - Total: 244.4 km^{2} (94.4 sq mi)

Population (2022)
  - Total: 19,475
  - Density: 79.68/km^{2} (206.4/sq mi)
- Settlements: 26
- Cities: 1
- Villages: 25
- Website: galycka-gromada.gov.ua

Halych urban territorial hromada (Ukrainian: Галицька міська територіа́льна грома́да, romanized: Halytska miska terytorialna hromada) is a hromada (municipality) in Ukraine, in Ivano-Frankivsk Raion of Ivano-Frankivsk Oblast. The administrative center is the city of Halych.

The area of the hromada is 244.4 square kilometres (94.4 mi^{2}), and the population is 19,475 (2022 estimate)

Until 18 July 2020, the hromada belonged to Halych Raion. The raion was abolished in July 2020 as part of the administrative reform of Ukraine, which reduced the number of raions of Ivano-Frankivsk Oblast to six. The area of Halych Raion was merged into Ivano-Frankivsk Raion.

== Settlements ==
The municipality consists of the city of Halych and 25 villages:

- Bliudnyky
- Bryn
- Vysochanka
- Viktoriv
- Hannivtsi
- Demeshkivtsi
- Dorohiv
- Zalukva
- Kozyna
- Kolodiiv
- Komariv
- Krylos
- Kurypiv
- Medynia
- Nimshyn
- Ostriv
- Perlivtsi
- Poplavnyky
- Prydnistrovia
- Pukasivtsi
- Sapohiv
- Sokil
- Subotiv
- Temyrivtsi
- Shevchenkove
