= Dubivtsi, Ivano-Frankivsk Oblast =

Village in Ivano-Frankivsk Oblast, Ukraine

Dubivtsi Дубівці
- Village
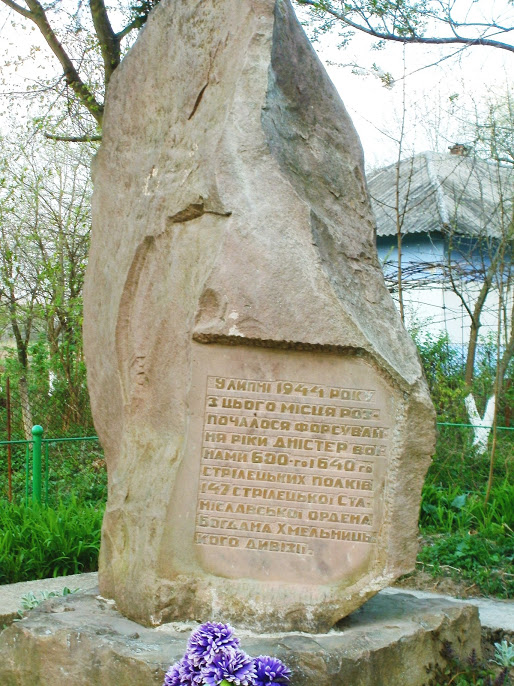
- Monument to Polish population transfers in Dubivtsi

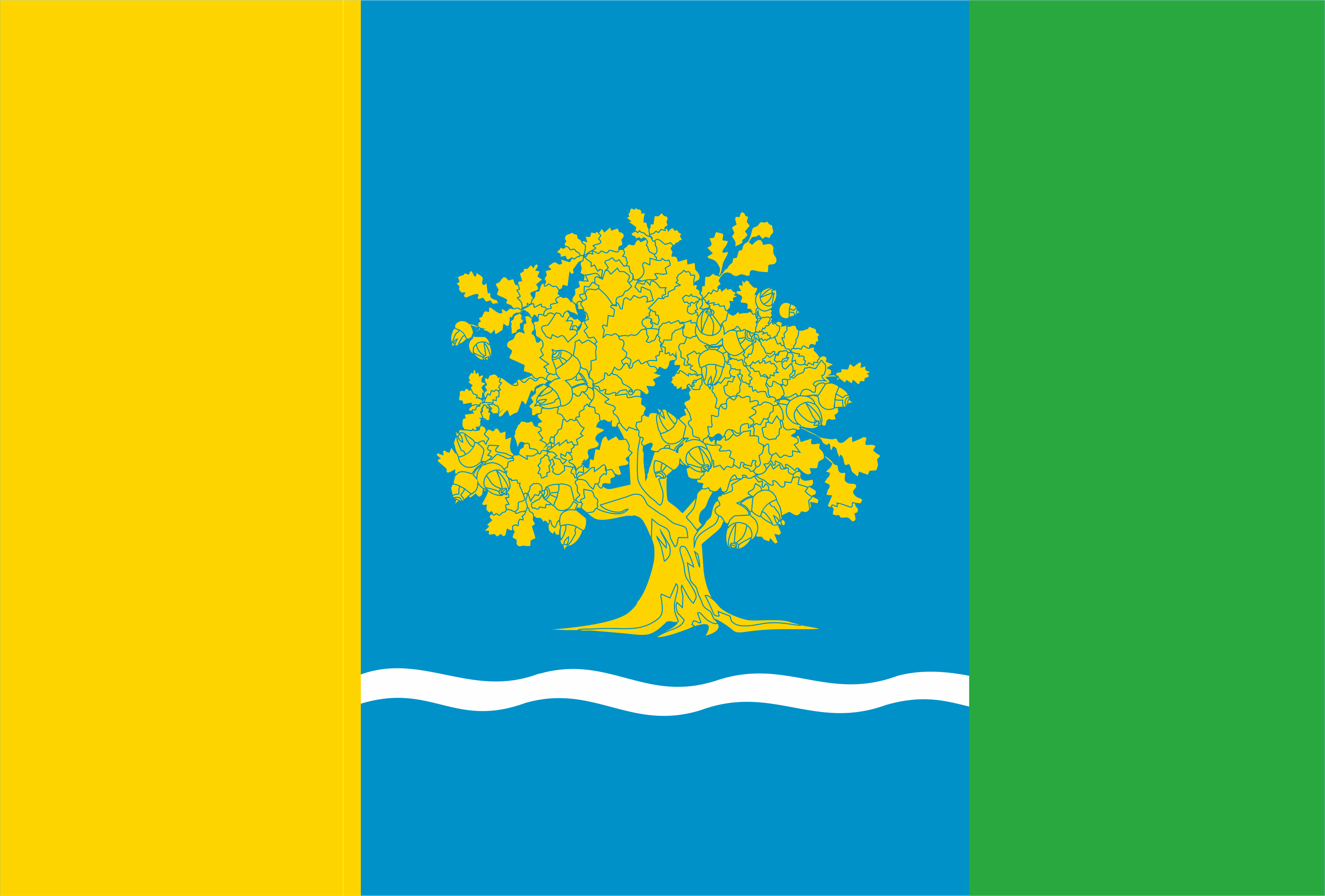
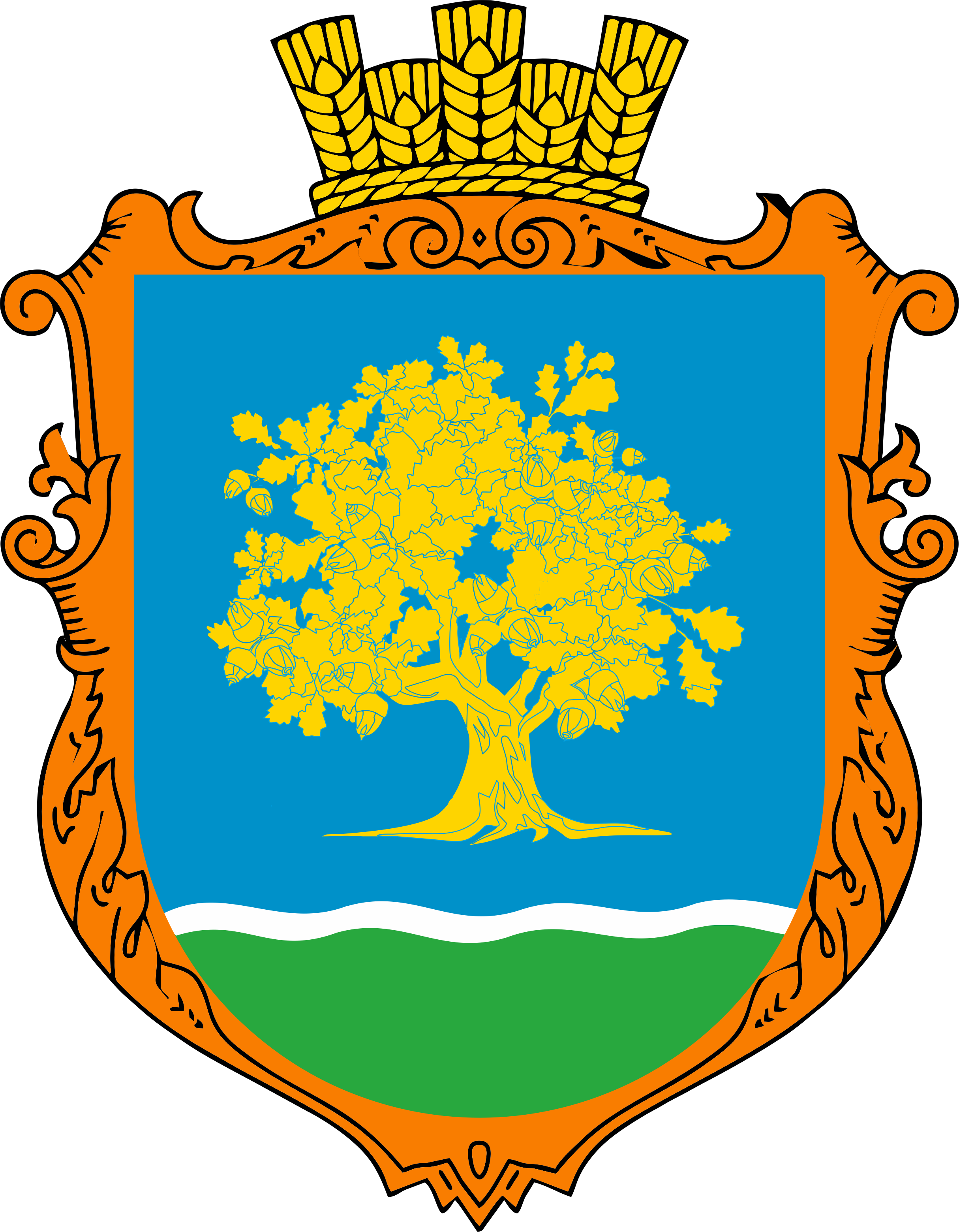
- Flag Coat of arms

- Location of Dubivtsi in Ivano-Frankivsk Oblast Location of Dubivtsi in Ukraine
- Coordinates: 49°04′53″N 24°46′25″E
- Country: Ukraine
- Oblast: Ivano-Frankivsk Oblast
- Raion: Ivano-Frankivsk Raion
- First mentioned: 1419

Dubivtsi (Ukrainian: Дубівці; Polish: Dubowce) is a village in Ukraine's western Ivano-Frankivsk Oblast, in Ivano-Frankivsk Raion. It is the administrative centre of the Dubivtsi rural hromada.

== History ==
Dubivtsi was first mentioned in 1419. Local legends have variously claimed that the name is from oak boats constructed in the area or from the village's founder hiding in an oak grove during a battle. Settlement in the village's surrounding areas dates back to the Paleolithic, with objects from the Cucuteni–Trypillia culture being found near Dubivtsi.

Residents of Dubivtsi have been actively involved in Ukrainian nationalism, participating in the Khmelnytsky Uprising, Ukrainian Sich Riflemen, and Ukrainian Insurgent Army.

Dubivtsi's church, the Church of Nativity of the Theotokos, was rebuilt by village inhabitants after it was destroyed in an 1815 fire. Its design is unusual for a wooden church due to its generally chaotic design, with uneven surfaces.

== Notable residents ==
- Mykhailo Korzhak, Ukrainian Insurgent Army commander
