= Kuziv =

Kuziv (Ukrainian: Кузів) is a gender-neutral Ukrainian surname. It may refer to

- Bohdan Kuziv (born 1965), Ukrainian painter, graphic artist
- Illia Kuziv (1874–1916), Ukrainian Greek Catholic priest, writer, translator, publicist, and folklorist
- Ivan Kuziv (1857–1918), Ukrainian Greek Catholic priest and ethnographer
- Oksana Kuziv (born 1970), Ukrainian writer, poet, and journalist
- Orest-Vasyl Kuziv (born 1997), Ukrainian artist
