= Ozeriany =

Ozeryany (Ukrainian: Озеряни) may refer to the following places in Ukraine:

== Villages ==
Chernihiv Oblast

- Ozeriany, Bobrovytsia Raion
- Ozeriany, Varva Raion

Ivano-Frankivsk Oblast

- Ozeriany, Burshtyn urban hromada, Ivano-Frankivsk Raion, Ivano-Frankivsk Oblast
- Ozeriany, Tlumach Raion, Ivano-Frankivsk Oblast

Kherson Oblast

- Ozeriany, Kherson Oblast

Rivne Oblast

- Ozeriany, Rivne Oblast

Ternopil Oblast

- Ozeriany, Borshchiv urban hromada, Chortkiv Raion, Ternopil Oblast
- Ozeriany, Buchach Raion

Volyn Oblast

- Ozeriany, Lutsk Raion
- Ozeriany, Turiisk Raion

Zhytomyr Oblast

- Ozeriany, Zhytomyr Oblast

== See also ==
- Jezierzany
