= Jezierzany =

Jezierzany may refer to the following places:

- Jezierzany, Lower Silesian Voivodeship (south-west Poland)
- Jezierzany, West Pomeranian Voivodeship (north-west Poland)
- Jezierzany, a town in the former province of Galicia, which ran along the southern border of Poland. It has an historical connection to the Austro-Hungarian Empire. Today, it is a populated place called Ozeriany, in Chortkiv Raion (district), Ternopil Oblast (province), Ukraine.

== Alternate spellings ==
- Yezerzhany
- Yezezhany
- Yeziverzany

== See also ==
- Ozeryany
