= 1st Assault Regiment (Ukraine) =

1st Separate Assault Regiment named after Dmytro Kotsiubailo
- Ukrainian: 1-й окремий штурмовий полк імені Дмитра Коцюбайла
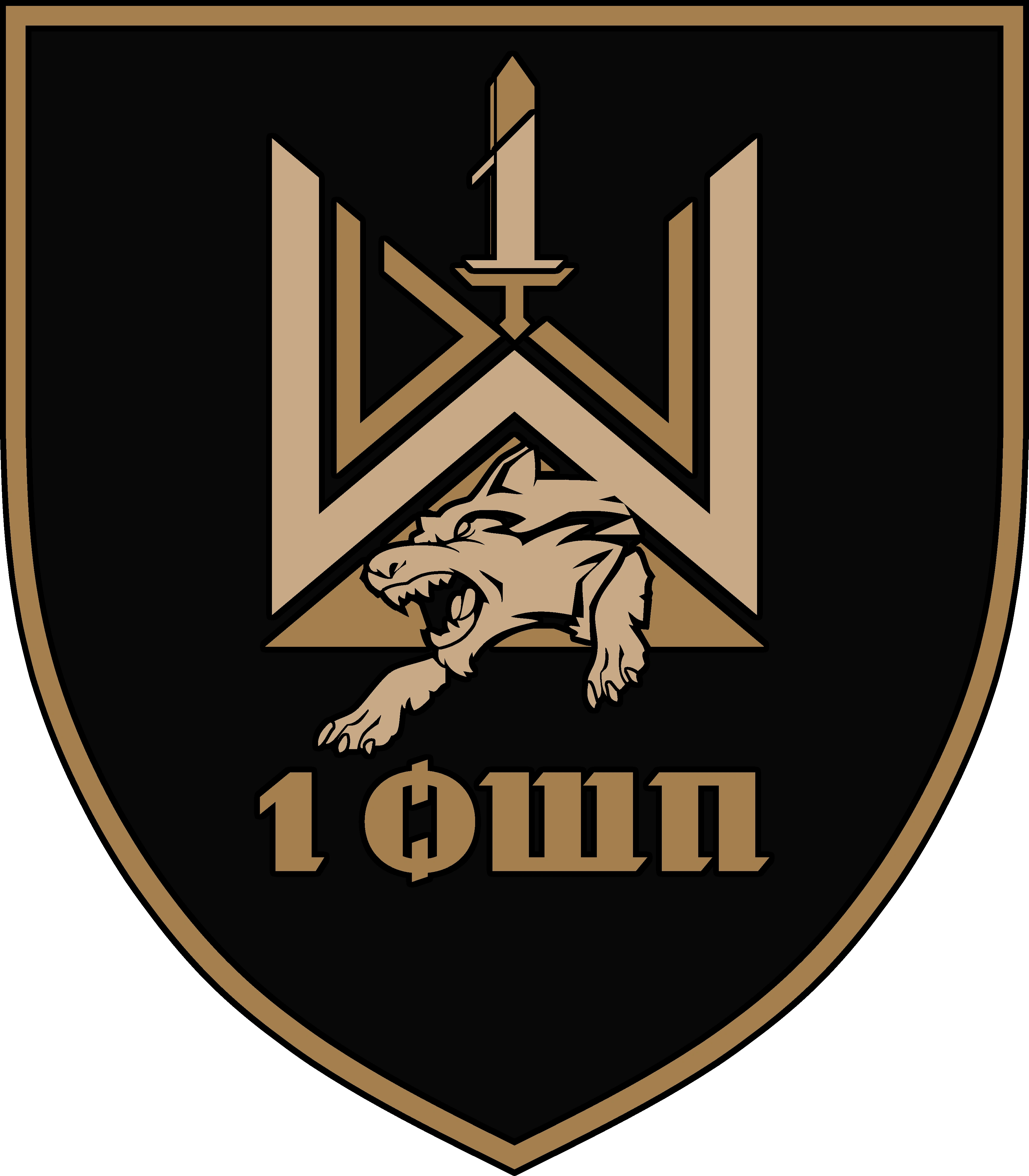
- Insignia of the regiment
- Founded: 20 January 2014 – present
- Country: Ukraine
- Branch: Right Sector Ukrainian Volunteer Corps (2014-2022); Ukrainian Ground Forces
- Role: Assault Infantry
- Part of: Operational Command North
- Garrison/HQ: Avdiivka; MUN A4848
- Patron: Dmytro Kotsiubailo
- Mottos: "Iron and Fire"
- Engagements: Russo-Ukrainian War; Russian invasion of Ukraine; Northern Ukraine campaign; Battle of Kyiv; Eastern Ukraine Campaign; 2022 Kharkiv counteroffensive; Battle of Bakhmut
- Website: Official website

Commanders
- Current commander: Captain Dmytro Filatov
- Notable commanders: Dmytro Kotsiubailo † (2016-2023)

Insignia
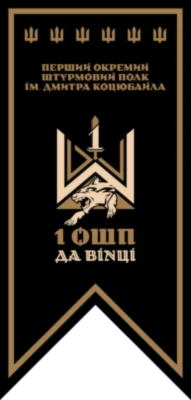
- Battle flag

The 1st Separate Assault Regiment named after Dmytro Kotsiubailo (Ukrainian: 1-й окремий штурмовий полк імені Дмитра Коцюбайла) is a unit of the Ukrainian Ground Forces based in Avdiivka. The unit was formerly a part of the Ukrainian Volunteer Corps and later the 67th Mechanized Brigade until April 2024.

== History ==
=== 2010s ===
The unit was initially formed as the 1st Assault Company of the 5th Battalion of the Ukrainian Volunteer Corps (DUK) on 20 January 2014. On 26 August 2015, the unit departed the 5th Battalion and was restructured as the 1st Company of the DUK.

On 17 March 2016, Dmytro Kotsiubailo was appointed as the commander of the unit, marking the beginning of its widely known nickname, 'Da Vinci', after Kostiubailo's call sign. The unit has been deployed to eastern Ukraine since its formation, and has participated in numerous battles alongside friendly forces. It relies primarily on donations and private funding to sustain its operations.

=== 2021 ===
In recognition of his service, Dmytro Kotsiubailo was awarded the decoration of Hero of Ukraine on 30 November 2021.

=== 2022 ===
In 2022, the unit expanded its ranks to reach full battalion strength and assumed command of the unit "Honor". Later that year, the unit was reorganized under the command of the 7th Special Operations Center and later integrated as the 1st Mechanized Battalion of the 67th Mechanized Brigade. On 7 March 2023, the unit’s commander, Dmytro Kotsiubailo, was killed in action during the Battle of Bakhmut, in the city of Chasiv Yar. In his honor, the unit was renamed after him on 1 July 2023.

=== 2023 ===
In the summer of 2023, the unit was reorganized as the 1st Separate Assault Battalion of the 67th Mechanized Brigade. In early 2024, the "Honor" and "Ulf" units departed from the battalion and brigade, continuing to use the same name and insignia. They would later go on to form the 108th Mechanized Battalion, as part of the 59th Motorized Brigade.

=== 2024 ===
By April 2024, following the complete restructuring of the 67th Mechanized Brigade, the battalion became fully independent from the brigade. In April 2025, the battalion was expanded to a regiment, becoming the 1st Assault Regiment.

During the full-scale Russian invasion of Ukraine, the unit has participated in key battles, including those for Zaporizhzhia Oblast, Kyiv, Bilohorivka, Kherson Oblast, and in the 2022 Kharkiv counteroffensive.

One of the unit's former military volunteers was USMC veteran and cousin of American vice president JD Vance — Nate Vance.

=== 2025 ===
On 13 June 2025, the 86th Territorial Defense Battalion of the 106th Territorial Defense Brigade announced its transfer into the 1st Assault Regiment, however, specifically how the unit is being integrated into the regiment has not been confirmed yet.

== Structure ==
As of 2025, the regiment's structure is as follows:

- 1st Assault Regiment
  - Regimental Headquarters and HQ Company
    - Management
    - Commandant Platoon
  - 1st Assault Infantry Battalion. Commander: Ihor "Mayak".
  - 2nd Assault Infantry Battalion
  - 86th Territorial Defense Battalion (?)
  - Shkval Battalion
  - Tank Company
  - Field Artillery Battalion
  - Reconnaissance Company "Dyke Pole"
  - Drone Battalion
  - Fire Support Company
  - Mortar Battery
  - Sniper Platoon
  - Engineering and Sapper Platoon
  - Signal Platoon "F7"
  - Logistic Battalion
  - Electronic Warfare Platoon
  - Medical Platoon

== Equipment ==
=== Vehicles ===
- FV103 Spartan – British armored personnel carrier
- International MaxxPro – American MRAP armored fighting vehicle
- M113 – American armored personnel carrier
- T-72B – Soviet main battle tank
- T-72B3M – Russian main battle tank
- TOS-1A – Russian multiple rocket launcher
- VCC-2 – Italian armored personnel carrier

== Commanders ==
- Lieutenant Dmytro Kotsiubailo (17/03/2016 – 07/03/2023).
- Major Yurii Kapustiak (07/03/2023 – ?)
- Captain Dmytro Filatov (? – present)
- Major Oleh Lototskyi – Chief of Staff

== Insignia ==
The insignia depicts a chevron with a rusty green border and a black canvas. At its center are sharp, angular shapes forming the Latin letters D, V, and W, representing the unit’s nickname, ‘Da Vinci Wolves’. A sword and the number one at the top signify its assault role and designation. Below is a wolf, symbolizing the nickname, with the unit’s abbreviation beneath it in Ukrainian letters.
