= Burshtyn =

City in Ivano-Frankivsk Oblast, Ukraine

Burshtyn Бурштин Burshtyn
- City
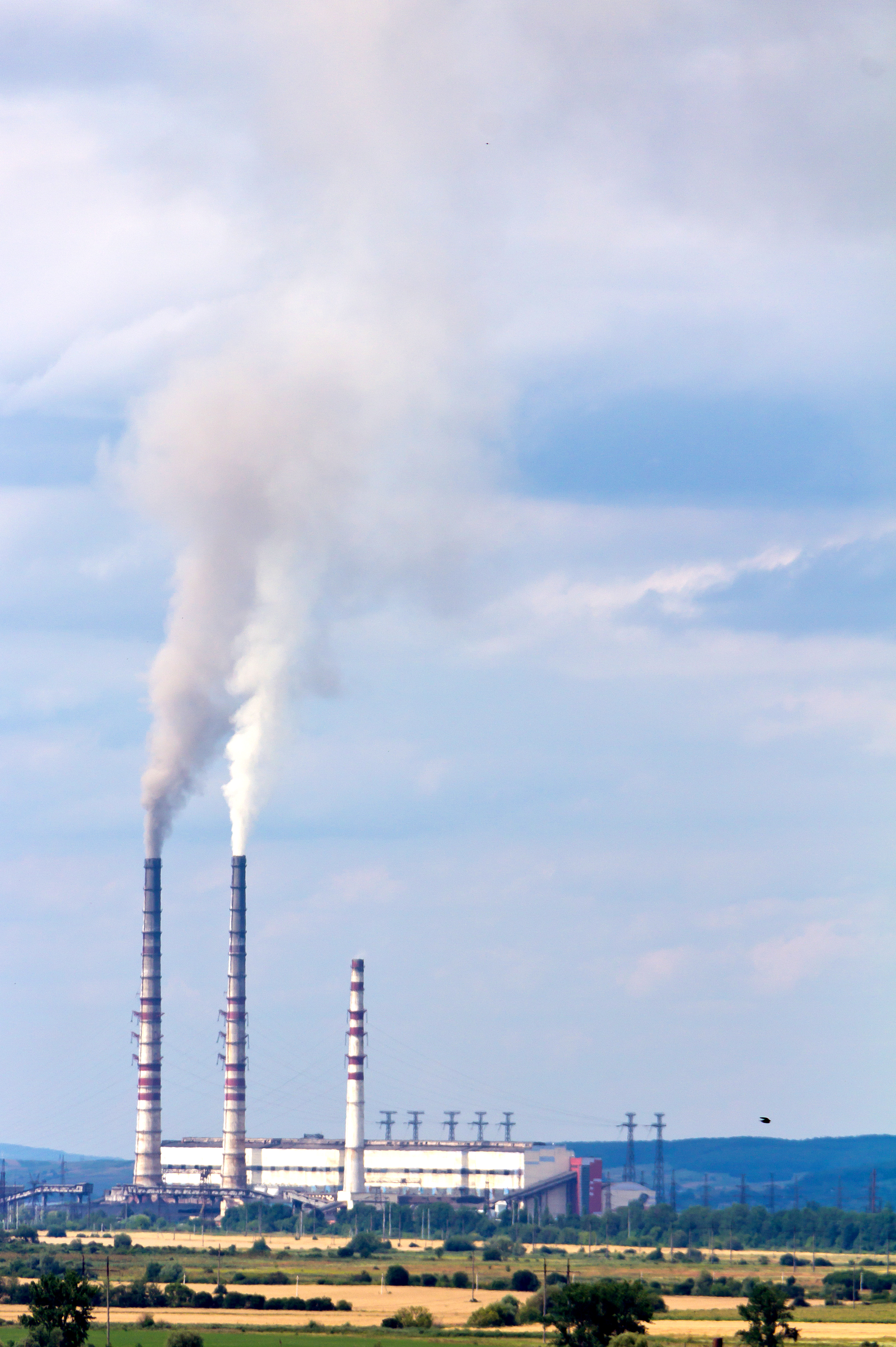
- Pipes of Burshtyn TES (coal-fired power station)

- Flag Seal
- Etymology: Amber (in Ukrainian and Polish)
- Location within Ivano-Frankivsk Oblast Location within Ukraine
- Coordinates: 49°15′30″N 24°37′40″E
- Country: Ukraine
- Oblast: Ivano-Frankivsk Oblast
- Raion: Ivano-Frankivsk Raion
- Hromada: Burshtyn urban hromada

Population (2023)
  - Total: 12,761

Burshtyn (Ukrainian: Бурштин, IPA: [bʊrʃˈtɪn], Polish: Bursztyn, German: Bernstein) is a city located in Ivano-Frankivsk Oblast, in western Ukraine, to the north of Halych. It is accessible by rail. Burshtyn hosts the administration of Burshtyn urban hromada, one of the hromadas of Ukraine. Population: 14,737 (2022 estimate).

It developed rapidly and significantly grew in population during the Soviet period. Administratively, Burshtyn is incorporated as a city of regional significance.

The town, which was one of the Jewish shtetls, and whose name in Ukrainian and Polish literally means amber, was only granted city status in 1993 and has a special administrative status in Halych Raion. As an urbanized settlement from 1944 to 1962, it was the main town of the raion. There is an old Roman Catholic Church in the center of the city, which was restored at the beginning of the 21st century.

One of its landmarks is the Burshtyn TES coal-fired power station, which is situated on a reservoir approximately 8 km long and 2 km wide. A fish farm lies on the lake near the district of Bilshivtsi. The town is known for its soccer club Enerhetyk.

== History ==
The settlement, then called Nove Selo (New village), was first mentioned in 1436 and received town status in 1554. It has had its present name since 1596. In the second half of the 16th century, the town belonged to the Polish noble Skarbek. In October 1629, a famous battle took place near the city, in which the registered Cossacks and the crown army under the command of Stefan Chmielecki and Yuliia Romaniv defeated the Tatar attackers led by Salamet-Geray, who were returning with loot from the Belz land. From 1630, the owner of Burshtyn was the tycoon Jabłonowski. during the Polish-Turkish wars of the 17th century (1629, 1675), the city was repeatedly destroyed by raids by Tatars and Turks.

In 1809, Franz Xaver Mozart, son of Wolfgang A. Mozart, lived in Burshtyn which at that time was part of the Austrian Empire. It was the center of Burshtyn District: until 1867, it was the administrative center, until 1919, it was the judicial center. On 1 September 1866, the first Lviv-Chernivtsi train passed through the Burshtyn station.

The Skarbek–Jablonowski Palace, built in the early nineteenth century, was one of the most notable aristocratic residences in the region and formed a distinctive element of Burshtyn’s historical landscape. Although severely damaged during the world wars and demolished in the 1950s, it is remembered for its extensive library, richly furnished interiors and landscaped park, with several surviving items now held in the Ivano-Frankivsk Regional Museum.

It was in Halych Raion until 11 March 2014. Subsequently, until 18 July 2020, Burshtyn was incorporated as a city of oblast significance and the center of Burshtyn Municipality. The municipality was abolished in July 2020 as part of the administrative reform of Ukraine, which reduced the number of raions of Ivano-Frankivsk Oblast to six. The area of Burshtyn Municipality was merged into the newly established Ivano-Frankivsk Raion.

== Jewish community ==
The first documentation of Jewish settlement in Burshtyn dates back to the first half of the 17th century. In the early 18th century, an independent community was organized in the town; a cemetery was consecrated, and a few years later, a synagogue was built.

From the mid-19th century, Admorim (Hasidic rabbis) of the Stratyn Hasidic dynasty resided in the town, alongside followers of the Belz and Chortkov Hasidic sects.

In 1898, a Jewish school was established in the town by the Baron Hirsch Fund, and in 1909, a Hebrew school was founded. At the end of the 19th century, a Hovevei Zion association was established in the town.

During World War I, many of the town's Jews fled due to fear of the Russian armies. The remaining Jewish residents suffered from pogroms carried out by Russian soldiers and later by Cossacks. Furthermore, many of the town's houses were burned down, and in 1918, epidemics broke out, claiming many victims. Following the end of the war, 11 Jews were murdered in the town during the Petliura pogroms. In the wake of these events, many of the town's Jews departed.

With the assistance of former residents in the United States and mutual aid institutions, the community was rehabilitated. During the 1920s and 1930s, branches of the Mizrachi and Revisionist movements were established, and Zionist youth movements such as Gordonia, Betar, and HaNoar HaTzioni were active.

Between the world wars, there were approximately 1,800 Jews in Burshtyn, accounting for more than half of the total population at the time.

=== During the Holocaust ===
Following the occupation of the region by the Red Army in September 1939, Jewish businesses were nationalized, and activists from Zionist parties and youth movements were exiled. After the invasion of the Soviet Union by Germany and its allies in Operation Barbarossa in June 1941, the town was captured by Hungarian military forces. In August 1941, the town was passed to German rule. During the interim period, local Ukrainian residents carried out pogroms against the town's Jews.

In August 1941, a Judenrat was established, headed by Lipa Shomer, who was required to deliver high ransom payments and valuables to the Germans. In September 1941, the town's Jews were ordered to move into a ghetto; they were forbidden from walking on sidewalks and were required to wear an armband with a Star of David. Additionally, Jews were taken for forced labor, during which dozens died. In the winter of 1941–1942, many died as a result of starvation. Groups of young people who attempted to flee to Romania were mostly captured and murdered.

In the autumn of 1942, the town's Jews were transferred to the Rohatyn and Bukachivtsi ghettos, where they were either murdered on-site or deported to the Belzec extermination camp. German and Ukrainian police, assisted by local peasants, conducted manhunts for Jews who attempted to escape to the surrounding forests.

A partisan group operated in a nearby forest, some of whom were Jews from the town. One of their actions included an attack on the Burshtyn police station to seize weapons.

Following the liberation of the town by the Red Army on 27 July 1944, 13 Jews were found who had remained in hiding. During the 1950s, the town's synagogues were converted into grain warehouses.

There is a Jewish cemetery in Burshtyn founded in the 18th century, which is the last physical remnant of the Jewish community's existence in the town. As far as is known, the last burial there took place in 1940.

== Notable people ==
- Mika Newton, Ukrainian pop singer and Eurovision participant
- Oksana Kuziv, Ukrainian writer, poet, and journalist
- Zdzislaw Adamczyk (1886–1940) – Colonel of the Polish Army, mayor of Zakopane, murdered by the NKVD in the Katyn massacre
- Ludwik Finkel – Polish historian, rector of the Lwow University
- Franz Xaver Wolfgang Mozart, Austrian composer lived in the town in 1809.

== Gallery ==
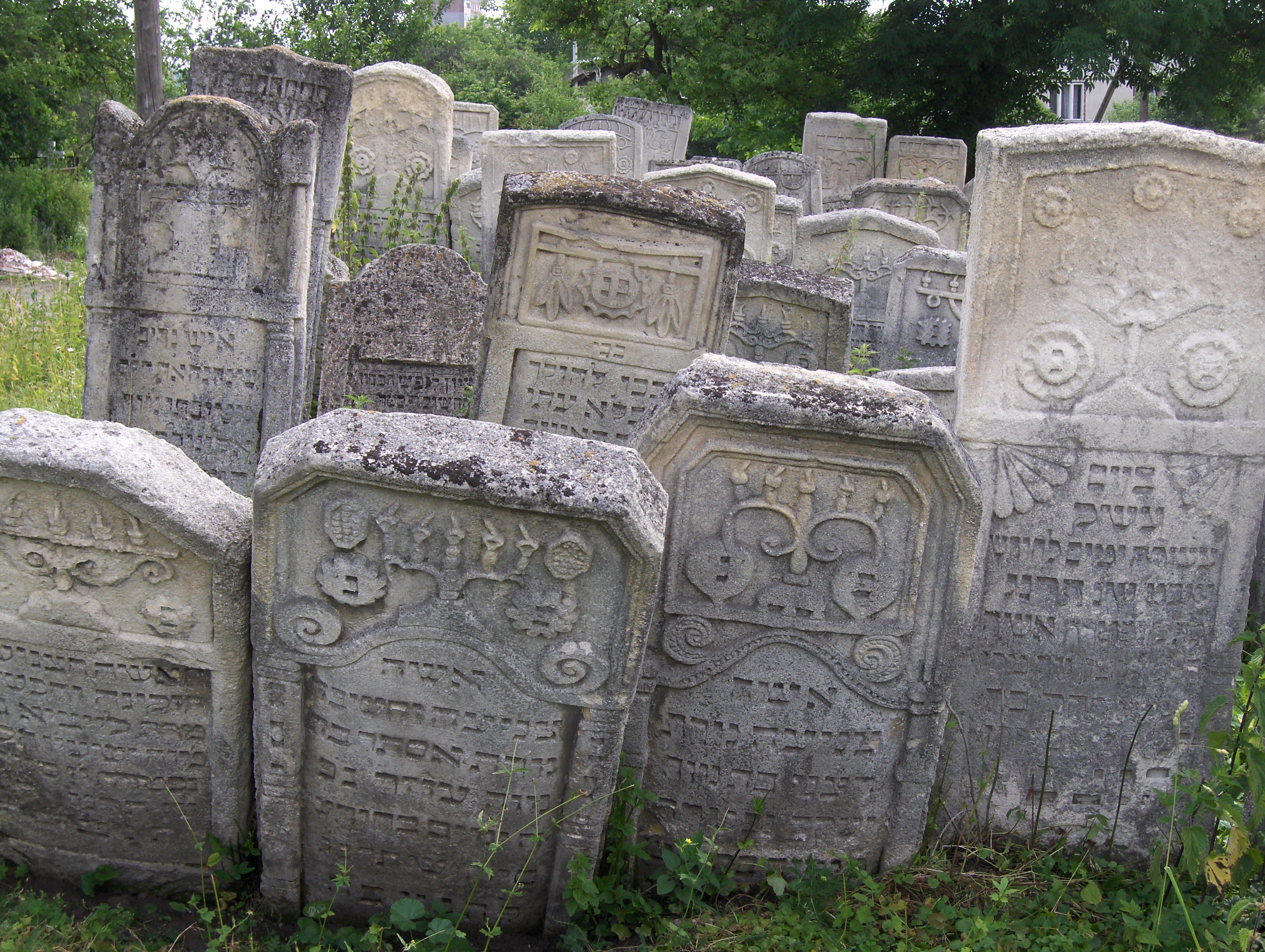
The old Jewish cemetery

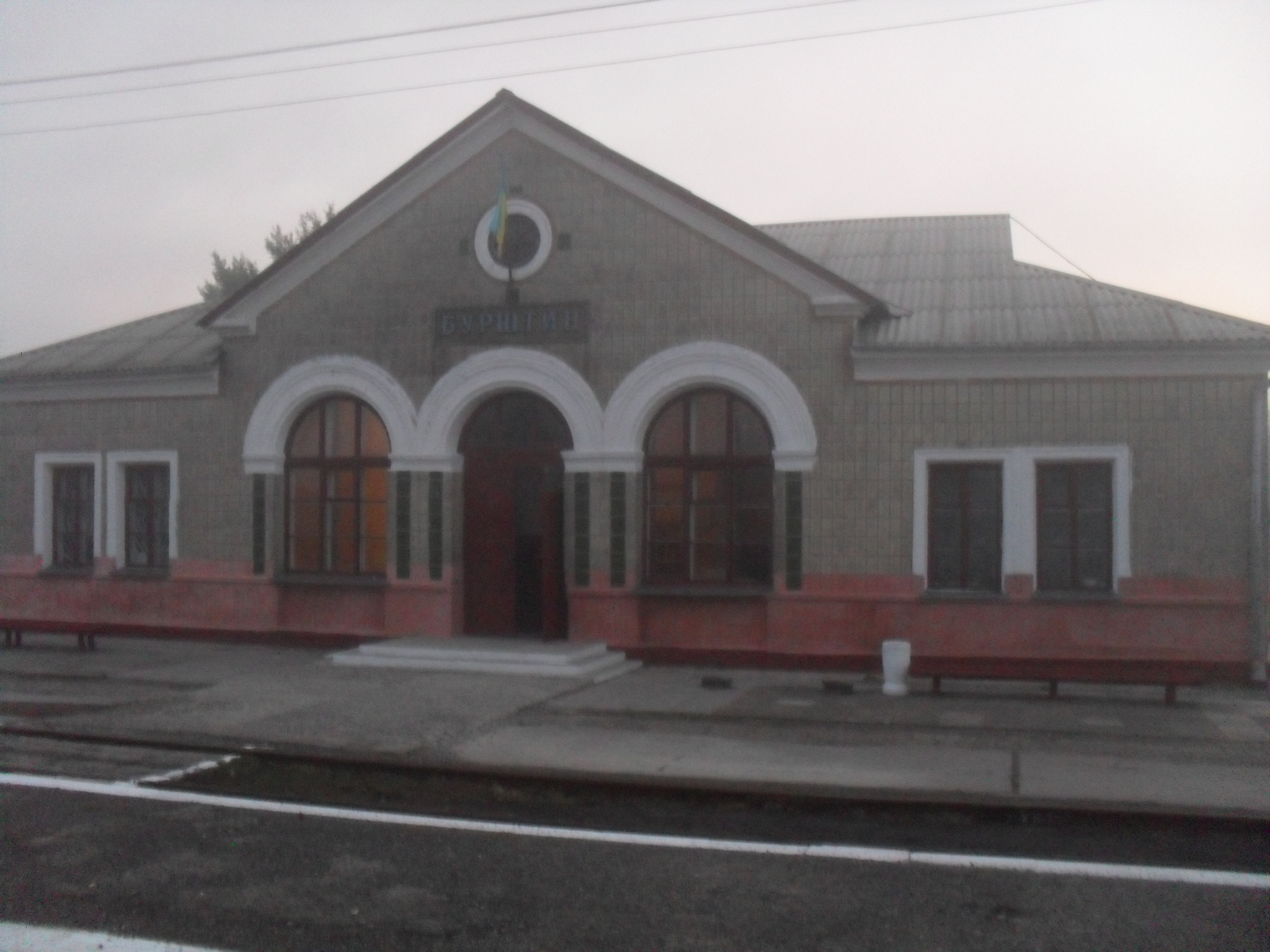
Burshtyn railway station

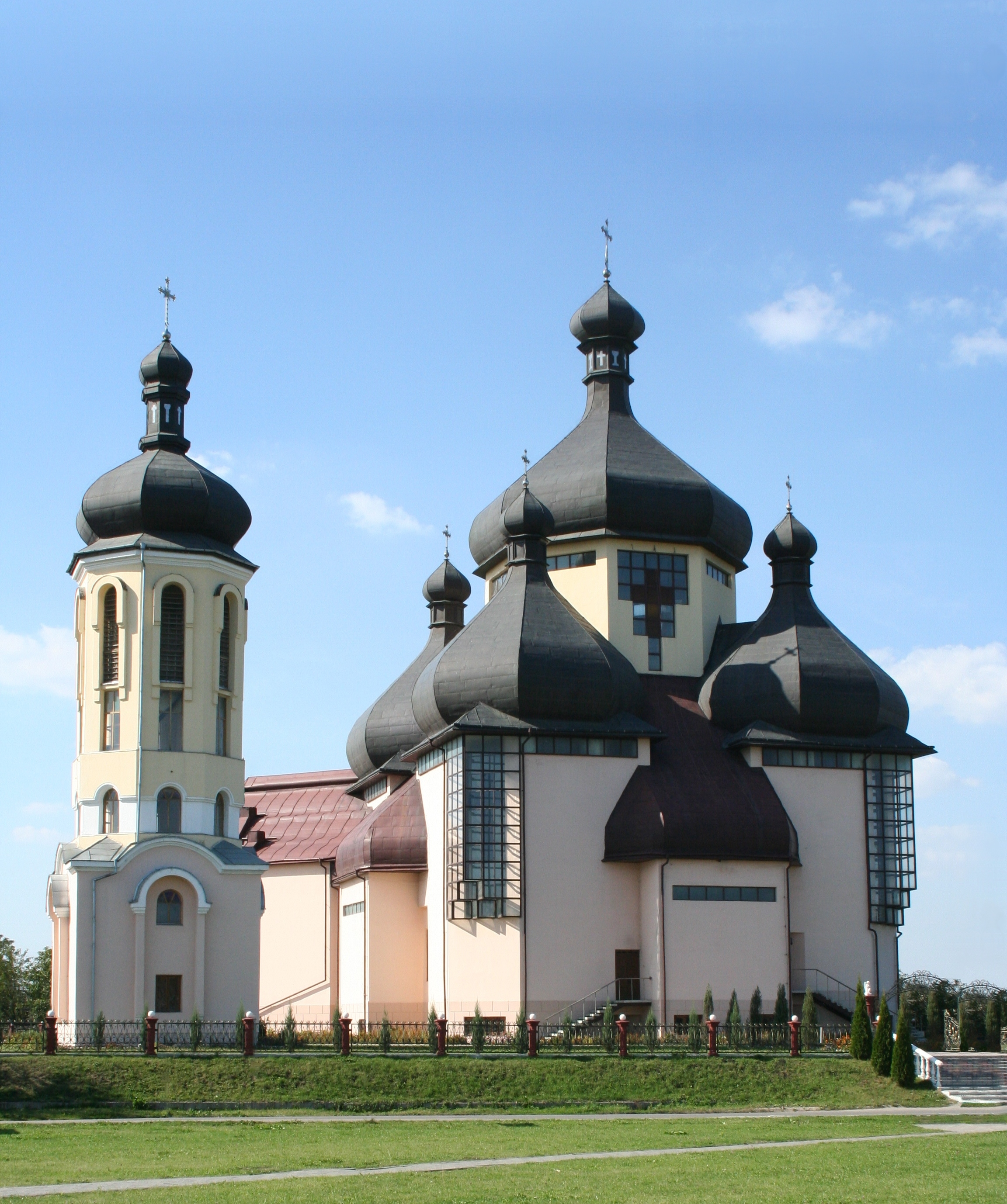
All Saints and Saint Josaphat Kuntsevych Church

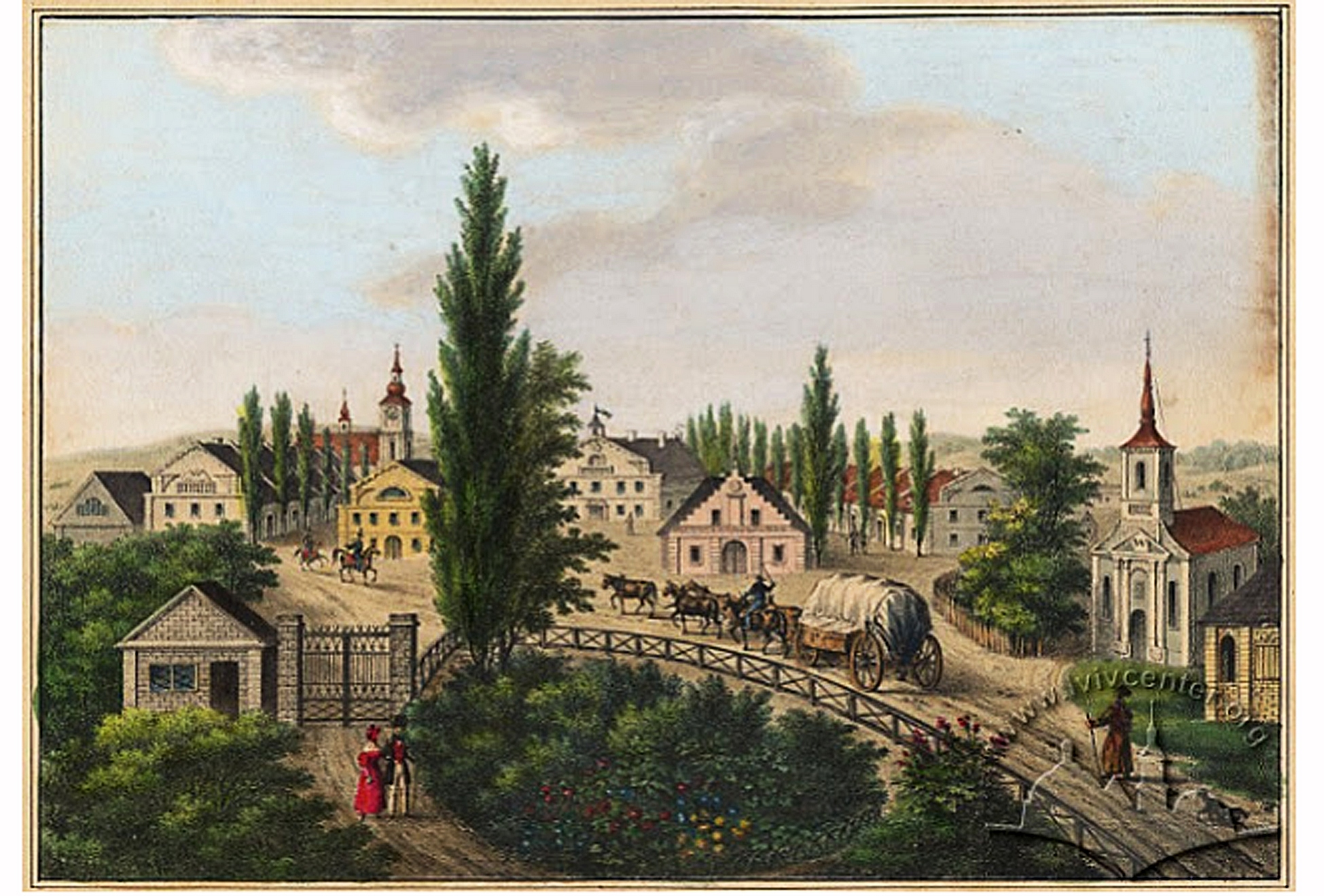
Burshtyn in 1837. Engraving Karel Auer

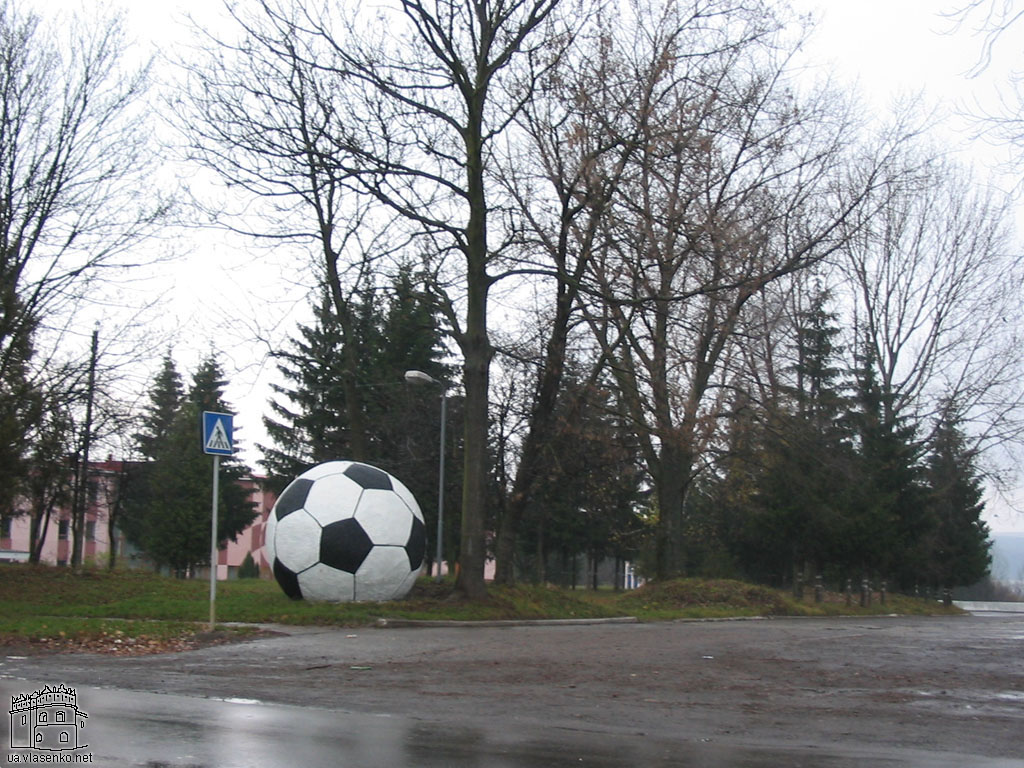
Sculpture of a soccer ball near the sports complex

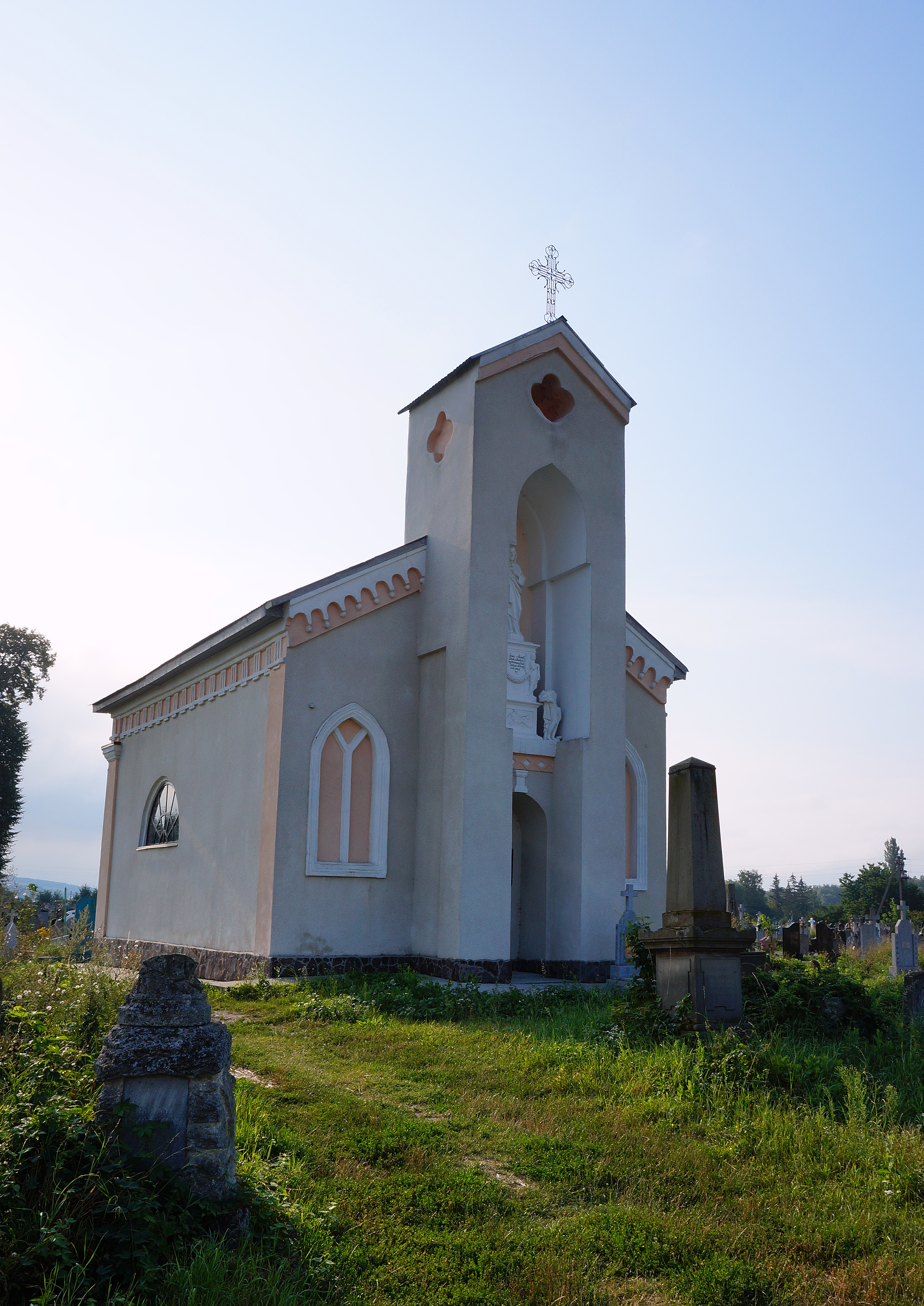
The tomb-chapel of the Skarbeks and Yablonovskys (1813)

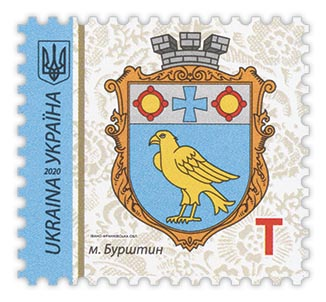
Ninth issue of standard postage stamps
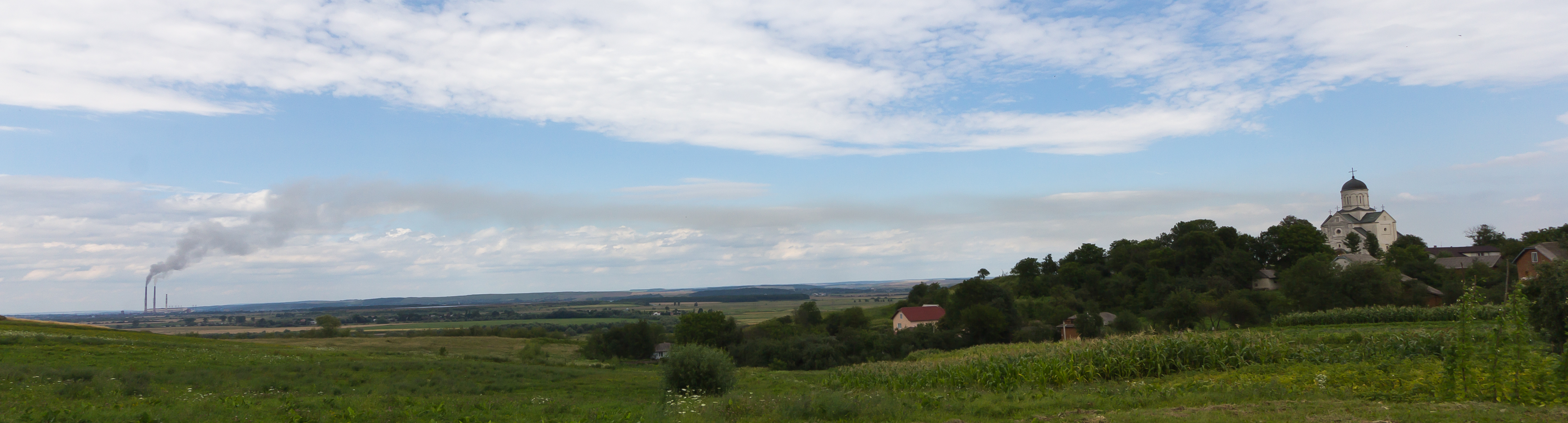
A large panorama of the outskirts of the city of Burshtyn and the Burshtyn thermal power station

== See also ==
- Amber Road
