= Dmytro Kotsiubailo =

Ukrainian soldier (1995–2023)

Dmytro Kotsiubailo Дмитро Коцюбайло
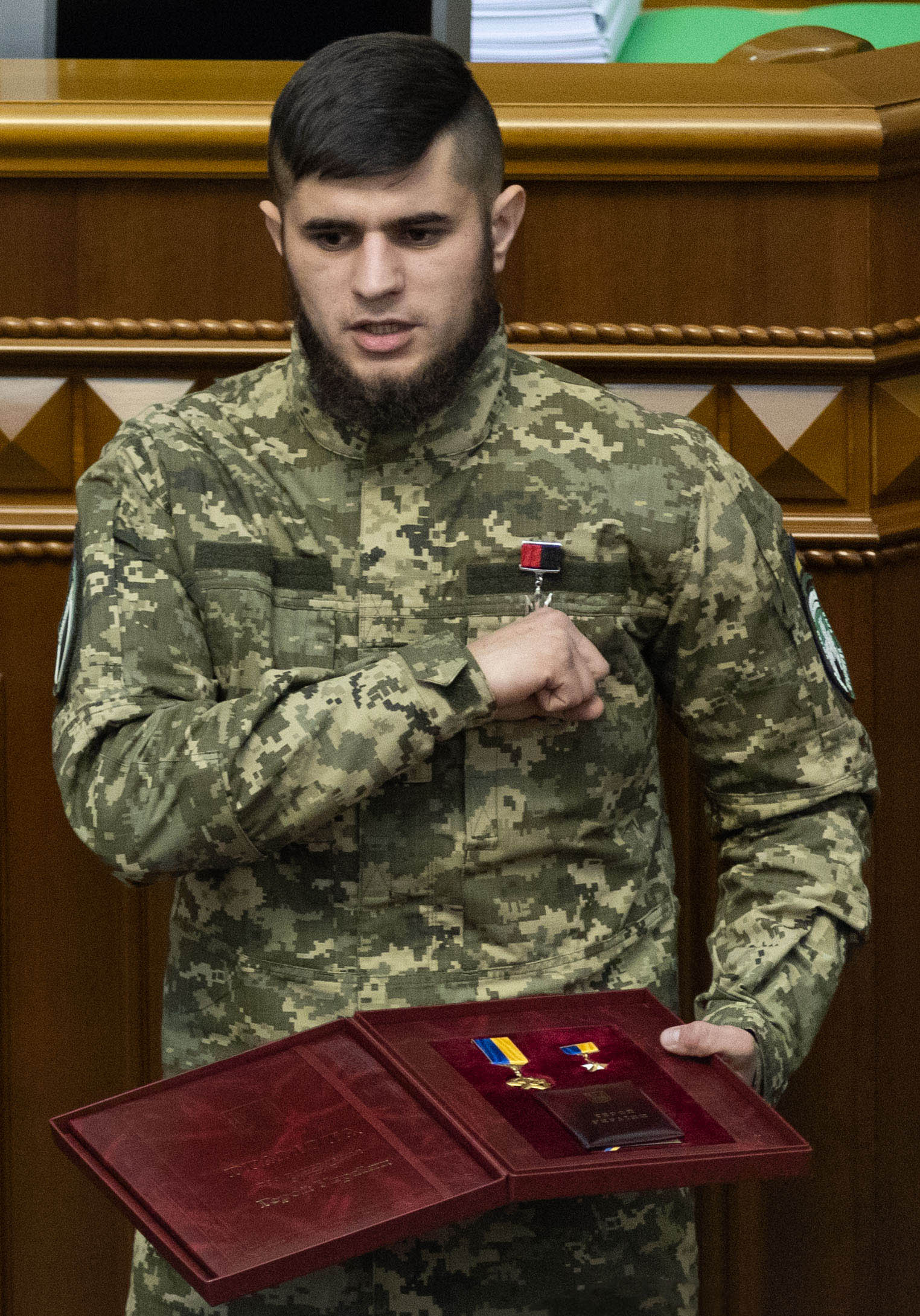
- Born: 1 November 1995; Zadnistrianske, Ivano-Frankivsk Oblast, Ukraine
- Died: 7 March 2023 (aged 27); Bakhmut, Donetsk Oblast, Ukraine
- Military career
- Allegiance: Ukrainian Armed Forces
- Rank: Lieutenant
- Nickname: Da Vinci
- Commands: 1st Mechanized Battalion
- Conflicts: Russo-Ukrainian War; Russian invasion of Ukraine; Battle of Kyiv; Kharkiv counteroffensive; Battle of Bakhmut †
- Awards: Hero of Ukraine Cross of Military Merit People's Hero of Ukraine

Dmytro Ivanovych "Da Vinci" Kotsiubailo (Ukrainian: Дмитро Іванович "Да Вінчі" Коцюбайло; 1 November 1995 – 7 March 2023) was a Ukrainian volunteer, soldier, lieutenant, a commander of the 1st Mechanized Battalion of the Armed Forces of Ukraine. He was a participant in the Russo-Ukrainian War. Kotsiubailo was the youngest battalion commander in the history of the Ukrainian Army. He served as a leader of the right-wing Right Sector movement.

In December 2021 President Volodymyr Zelenskyy awarded Kotsiubailo the Hero of Ukraine decoration, the country's highest honour. In 2022, he was included in the 30 under 30: Faces of the Future rating by Forbes. In March 2023, he was killed at the Battle of Bakhmut.

== Early life ==
Dmytro Kotsiubailo was born on 1 November 1995 in the village of Zadnistrianske, now Burshtyn community, Ivano-Frankivsk Raion, Ivano-Frankivsk Oblast, Ukraine. He graduated from Bovshivka Secondary School and Ivano-Frankivsk Art Lyceum.

== Ukrainian resistance ==
He was an active participant in the 2014 Revolution of Dignity. He fought in the Russo-Ukrainian War, as a platoon commander of volunteers in 2014, and as a company commander in 2015. In 2014, he was wounded in Pisky, Donetsk Oblast, and returned to the front after recovery. On 17 March 2016, Kotsiubailo was appointed commander of the 1st Separate Assault Company of the Right Sector Ukrainian Volunteer Corps. In 2022, his unit was integrated into the Armed Forces of Ukraine and expanded into the Da Vinci Wolves Battalion.

== Death and legacy ==
On 7 March 2023, Kotsiubailo was killed. President Volodymyr Zelenskyy said in his video address: "Today, 'Da Vinci', a Hero of Ukraine, a volunteer, a man-symbol, a man of courage, Dmytro Kotsiubailo, was killed in action. A fighter of the 67th separate mechanized brigade, a commander. He died in the battle near Bakhmut, in the battle for Ukraine". Dmytro was buried at Askold's Grave.

On 20 December 2023 the Dnipro City Council renamed a part of Dnipro's central avenue Dmytro Kotsiubailo Avenue in honor of Kotsiubailo.

On 18 January 2024 the Kyiv City Council renamed a square in Kyiv's Pecherskyi District in his honor.

On 20 May 2024 the Poltava city council renamed a street in its city in honour of Kotsiubailo.

== Awards ==
- The title of Hero of Ukraine with the Order of the Golden Star (30 November 2021) — for personal courage in the defense of state sovereignty and territorial integrity of Ukraine;
- Cross of Military Merit (9 March 2023, posthumously);
- National Legend of Ukraine (23 August 2023, posthumously)
- Order of the People's Hero of Ukraine (2017).

== Military ranks ==
- Lieutenant
- Junior Lieutenant (2022)
