= Burshtyn urban hromada =

Hromada in Ivano-Frankivsk Oblast, Ukraine

Burshtyn urban hromada Бурштинська міська громада
- hromada
- Seal

- Location within Ivano-Frankivsk Oblast Location within Ukraine
- Coordinates: 49°15′36″N 24°38′06″E
- Country: Ukraine
- Oblast: Ivano-Frankivsk Oblast
- Raion: Ivano-Frankivsk Raion
- Administrative center: Burshtyn

Area
  - Total: 2,036 km^{2} (786 sq mi)

Population
  - Total: 24,470
- Sity: 1
- Villages: 18
- Website: burshtyn-rada.gov.ua

Burshtyn urban hromada (Ukrainian: Бурштинська міська громада) is a hromada in Ukraine, in Ivano-Frankivsk Raion of Ivano-Frankivsk Oblast. The administrative center is the city of Burshtyn.

== Settlements ==
The hromada consists of 1 city (Burshtyn) and 18 villages:

- Bovshiv
- Vyhivka
- Demianiv
- Dibrova
- Zadnistrianske
- Zalyvky
- Korostovychi
- Kunychi
- Kuropatnyky
- Nastashyne
- Novyi Martyniv
- Ozeriany
- Rizdviany
- Sarnyky
- Sloboda
- Staryi Martyniv
- Tenetnyky
- Yunashkiv
