= Nate Vance =

American military veteran (born 1978)

- Born: 1978 (age 47–48)
- Known for: Service in the Russo-Ukrainian War, public criticism of U.S. policy on Ukraine under the Trump administration
- Family: JD Vance (first cousin)
- Military career
- Allegiance: United States; Ukraine
- Branch: United States Marine Corps (1995–1999); Ukrainian Armed Forces (2022–2025)
- Unit: Da Vinci Wolves (Ukraine)
- Conflicts: Russo-Ukrainian War; Battle of Kupiansk; Battle of Bakhmut; Battle of Avdiivka; Battle of Pokrovsk

Nate Vance (born 1978) is an American veteran of the United States Marine Corps, and former volunteer combatant in the Russo-Ukrainian War. He is the first cousin of JD Vance, the 50th vice president of the United States, and served four years in the U.S. Marine Corps before later volunteering to fight for Ukraine from 2022 to 2025.

In early 2025, after returning from the front lines, Vance drew international media attention for interviews in which he openly criticized his cousin's and the Trump administration's stance on the war.

== Early life and family ==
Nate Vance is the son of James “Jimmy” Vance, the maternal uncle of JD Vance, making Nate and JD first cousins.

According to Nate, the two grew up knowing each other well through family summer vacations in their youth.

Vance spent part of his early life in Texas and later in California, where his immediate family settled, maintaining ties with his Ohio-based relatives. Little is publicly documented about his formal education; however, he enlisted in the U.S. Marine Corps at age 17 in 1995, suggesting he completed high school before beginning his military service.

== Military career ==
=== U.S. Marine Corps ===
Vance enlisted in the Marine Corps, serving four years. He joined in the mid-1990s, a period when the Marines were not engaged in major active conflicts, so he did not see combat during his enlistment. Instead, he gained extensive infantry and weapons training, an experience he later credited with honing his combat skills. After being honorably discharged, Vance moved to Texas and worked in the oil industry for a time, leading a relatively quiet civilian life before 2022.

=== Volunteer in the Russia–Ukraine War ===
Following Russia's full-scale invasion of Ukraine in February 2022, Vance traveled to Lviv in March 2022, stating his intent "to help." There he met foreign volunteers, including a British volunteer recruiter, and subsequently enlisted in the Ukrainian Armed Forces. By June 2022, he had joined a Ukrainian volunteer unit known as the Da Vinci Wolves, a battalion within Ukraine's 1st Mechanized Brigade named after the fallen Ukrainian commander Dmytro Kotsiubailo.

Vance served in the battalion's "Honor" Company. According to fellow fighters, his prior military experience made him a capable marksman, with younger soldiers noting his accuracy at long range using iron sights. Battalion commander Serhii Filimonov described Vance as "an excellent fighter with a cool-headed nature" and credited his leadership with saving lives on multiple occasions.

During his three years in Ukraine, Vance fought in some of the war's fiercest battles. According to reports, he saw frontline combat in major engagements including the battles of Kupiansk, Bakhmut, Avdiivka, and Pokrovsk – hotspots in eastern Ukraine that experienced intense and sustained fighting.

Vance remained in Ukraine until early 2025. He was formally discharged from Ukrainian service in January 2025.

He later explained that with the incoming second presidency of Donald Trump, he grew concerned that if he remained on the front lines, he risked capture by Russian forces who might target high-profile American volunteers. "It had become complicated to stay. I couldn't take the risk of being captured," Vance said, describing his decision to leave Ukraine just before the U.S. presidential inauguration.

Despite returning home, he expressed a continuing commitment to Ukraine, saying he "wants to continue helping Ukraine" even after active service.

== 2025 media interviews and public stance ==
After returning to the United States, Vance gave a series of high-profile interviews in March 2025 that brought him into the public eye. In these interviews – with outlets including CNN and the French newspaper Le Figaro – he spoke candidly about his differences with the U.S. government's approach to the Ukraine war, specifically criticizing his cousin JD Vance, who is serving as vice president under Trump.

Vance, who describes himself as a "Republican-leaning independent" and had been generally supportive of the Trump administration on other issues, said he found his cousin's stance on Ukraine deeply misguided.

One of the most notable statements Vance made was calling his cousin and Trump "Vladimir Putin's useful idiots." In an interview with Le Figaro, he argued that by halting or reducing support for Ukraine, his cousin and Trump were effectively doing Putin's bidding under the false hope of appeasing the Russian leader. Vance warned that the Kremlin would not "forget" any U.S. aid cuts despite attempts to curry favor. This blunt characterization garnered worldwide media coverage, with major outlets like the BBC and The Telegraph citing Vance's remarks as a "stinging rebuke" of the Trump administration's policy.

Vance also publicly criticized the treatment of Ukrainian president Volodymyr Zelenskyy during a White House meeting in late February 2025, in which JD Vance accused Zelenskyy of being ungrateful for American military assistance in an exchange that multiple observers characterized as confrontational. Nate Vance called the encounter "an ambush of absolute bad faith." He stated that he had initially attributed his cousin's public rhetoric critical of Ukraine to political calculation, but said the treatment of Zelenskyy represented a threshold he could not overlook. During his deployment, Nate Vance had also made multiple attempts to contact JD Vance to offer firsthand perspective on conditions in Ukraine, without success. His account received coverage from news outlets internationally.

JD Vance eventually responded to the public critique from his cousin. In a Fox News interview, the vice president praised Nate as "the toughest guy I knew" and said he would "be happy to talk to him". However, JD expressed puzzlement as to why Nate chose to air criticisms in the media, suggesting that his cousin "could have reached out through family" rather than contacting his Senate office or speaking out publicly. He also stated that he had refrained from commenting on Nate's service while the war was ongoing. Despite this response, as of the time of these interviews, it was unclear if the two had reconnected privately.

In September 2025, Vance was a special guest speaker at the Warsaw Security Forum.

== Personal life and legacy ==
As a first cousin of JD Vance, he shares in a family story that gained fame through JD's memoir Hillbilly Elegy, although Vance's own upbringing differed by being largely outside the Appalachian environment depicted in the book. He has remained active in speaking about the war, aiming to continue supporting Ukraine through advocacy and by sharing his experiences.

In interviews, he has stressed the importance of understanding the mindset of adversaries like Russia, arguing that American leaders should not project U.S. thinking onto the Kremlin's actions.
