= Saint Anne Church, Ozeriany =

Church in Ozeriany, Ukraine

Saint Anthony Church
- Костел Святої Анни
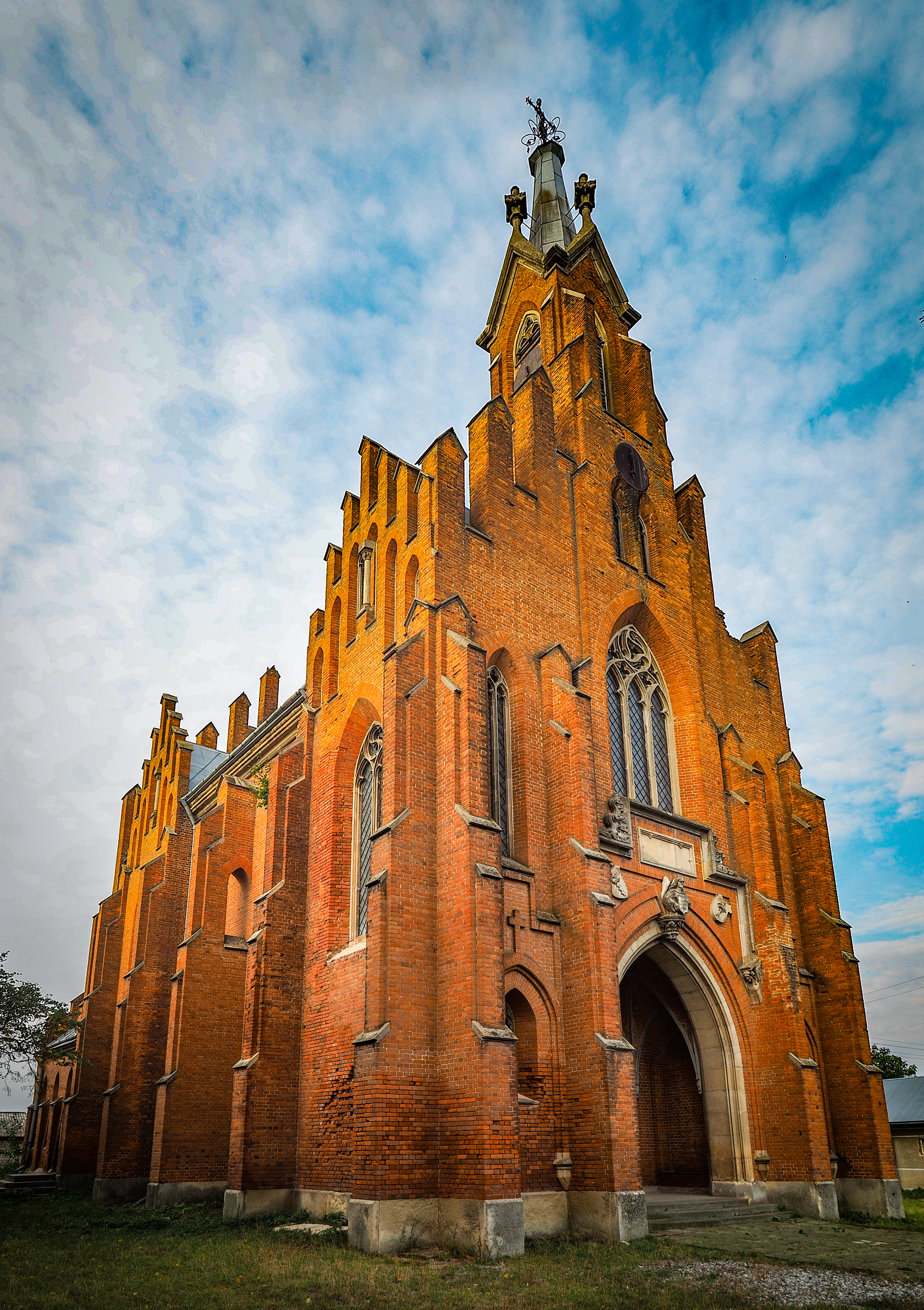

- Location within Ternopil Oblast

Location
- Location: Ozeriany
- Interactive map of Saint Anthony Church
- Coordinates: 48°52′46.4″N 25°56′39″E

Architecture
- Completed: 1875

Saint Anne Church (Ukrainian: Костел Святої Анни) is a Roman Catholic parish church in Ozeriany, Ternopil Oblast. An architectural monument of local importance.

== History ==
In 1854, a parish branch was established in Ozeriany. This branch united nearly two thousand Roman Catholics from about ten neighboring villages. Services for this large community were held in the local Greek Catholic church.

The Neo-Gothic Saint Anne's Church was built of red brick in 1875 according to a design by Lviv architect Adolf Kun (founder Leon Sapieha).

The parish in Ozeriany became an independent unit of the church division in the second half of the 1920s, as evidenced by data from schematics beginning in 1928. As before, pastoral care was provided by Vincentian missionaries throughout the interwar period and during World War II.

Due to the use of the church as a warehouse for grain and chemical fertilizers during the Soviet period, the walls of the temple suffered significant damage from leaks and chemicals. After the shrine was returned to the faithful in 1991, they began partial repairs. In addition, the community regained possession of the preserved church property. In 2023–2024, renovation work was carried out, focusing on interior restoration and the elimination of damage caused by chemical fertilizers.

The religious community is currently served by priests of the Congregation of St. Michael the Archangel (Mykhailites), who travel from the Holy Trinity Parish located in Borshchiv.

== Priests ==
- Franciszek Posochowski
- Jan Gurawski
