= Zadnistrianske =

Rural locality in Ivano-Frankivsk Oblast, Ukraine

- Village
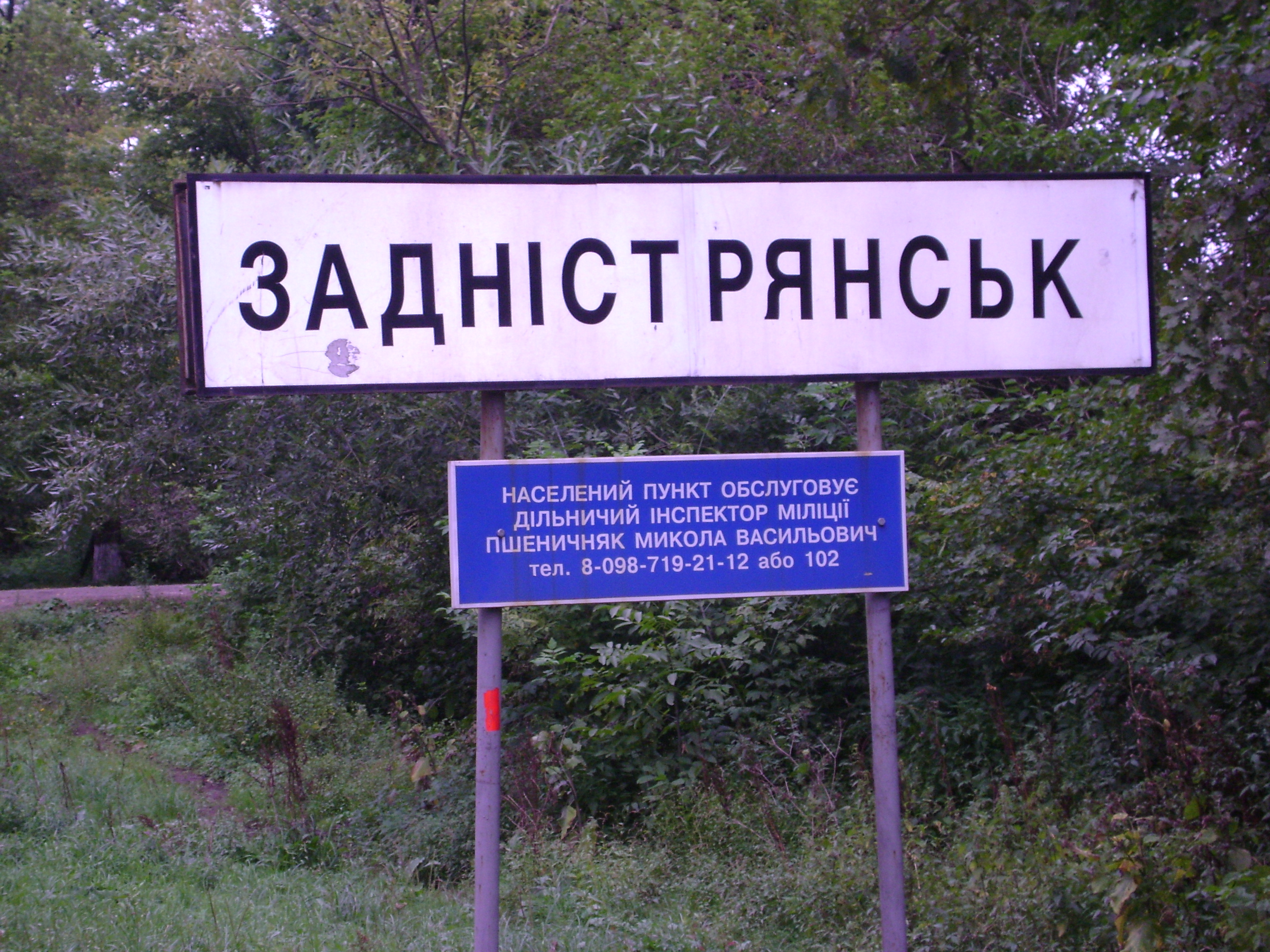
- Interactive map of Zadnistrianske
- Location within Ivano-Frankivsk Oblast Location within Ukraine
- Coordinates: 49°11′7″N 24°41′17″E
- Country: Ukraine
- Oblast: Ivano-Frankivsk Oblast
- Raion: Ivano-Frankivsk Raion

Population
  - Total: 1,325

Zadnistrianske (Ukrainian: Задністрянське) is a village of Ivano-Frankivsk Raion in Ivano-Frankivsk Oblast, Ukraine. It belongs to Burshtyn urban hromada, one of the hromadas of Ukraine. The village's population is about 1,000 inhabitants.

Until 18 July 2020, Zadnistrianske belonged to Halych Raion. The raion was abolished in July 2020 as part of the administrative reform of Ukraine, which reduced the number of raions of Ivano-Frankivsk Oblast to six. The area of Halych Raion was merged into Ivano-Frankivsk Raion.

== Gallery ==
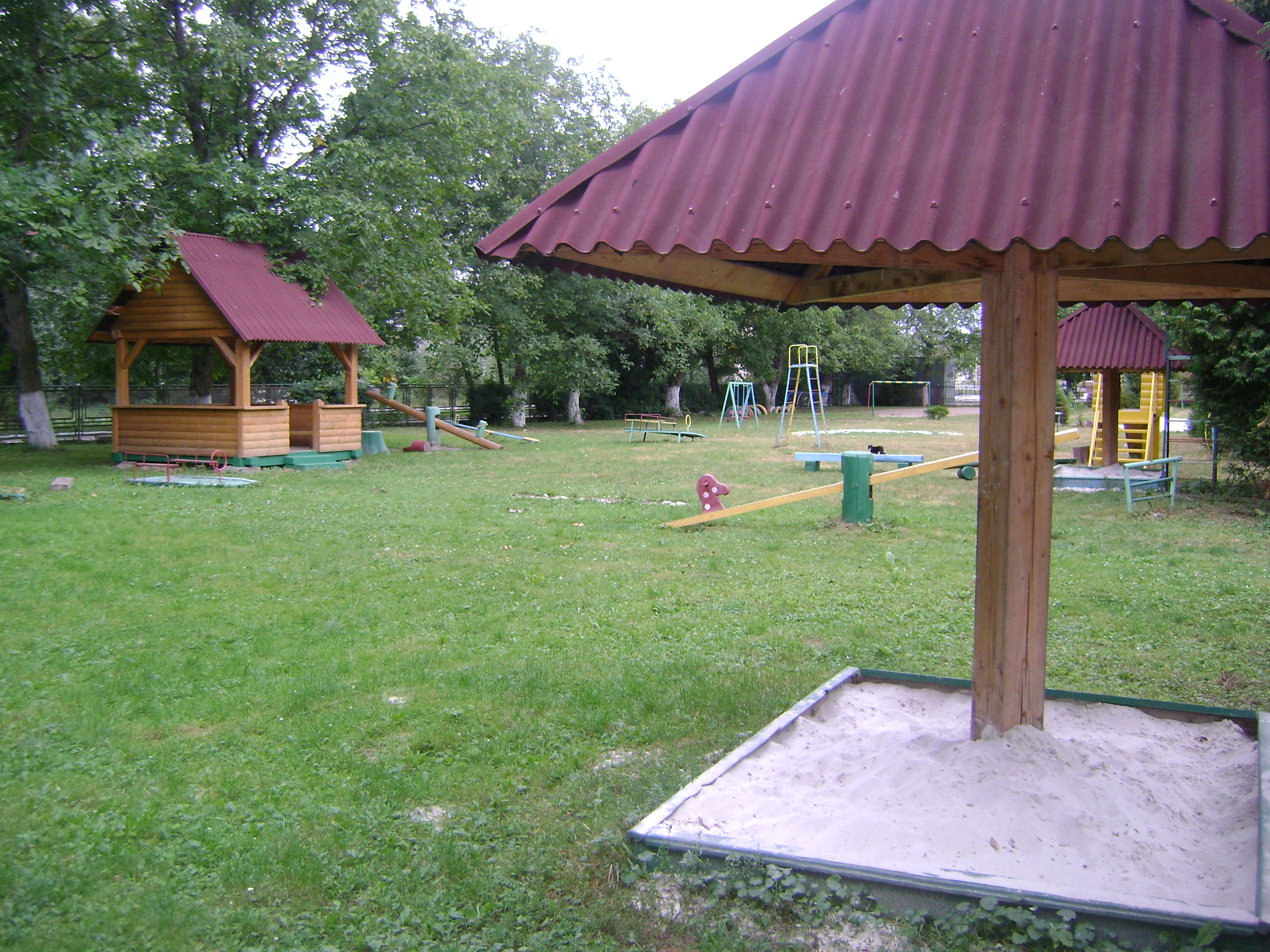
The playground

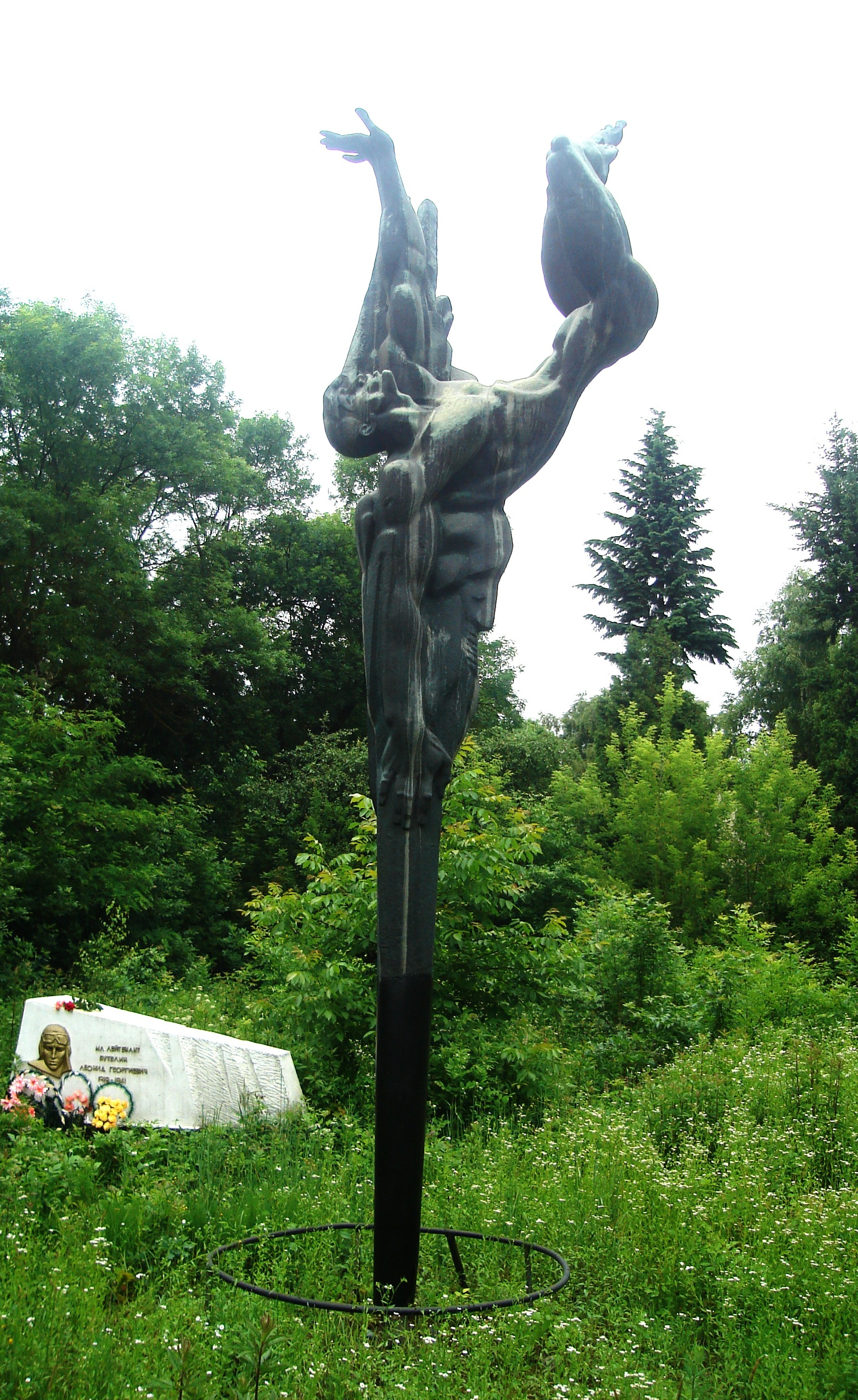
Monument in Zadnistryans'k to the pilot second lieutenant Butelin L.G., which destroyed one of fascist bombers and, using up all live ammunitions, accomplished an air ram in 5.15 a.m. 22 June 1941.

== Notable people ==
- Dmytro Kotsiubailo (1995-2023), Ukrainian military officer and Hero of Ukraine
