= 108th Assault Battalion (Ukraine) =

108th Separate Assault Battalion "Da Vinci Wolves" (2025–present) 108th Separate Mechanized Battalion (2024–2025)
- Ukrainian: 108-й окремий штурмовий батальйон «Вовки Да Вінчі»
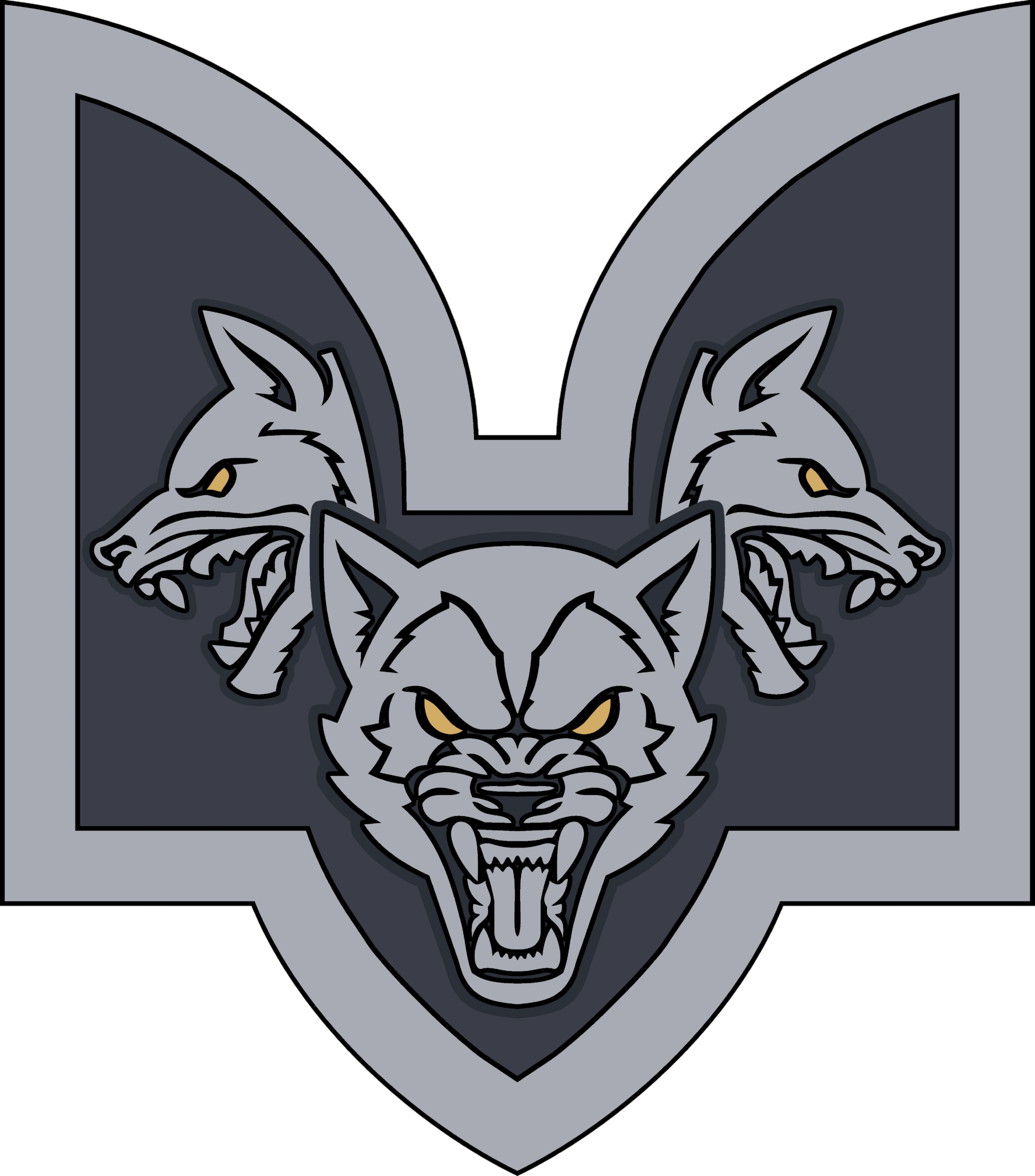
- Insignia of the battalion
- Active: 2024 – present
- Country: Ukraine
- Branch: Unmanned Systems Forces
- Role: Assault Infantry
- Size: 250 - 500 servicemen
- Part of: 59th Assault Brigade
- Garrison/HQ: Haisyn; MUN A4921
- Engagements: Russo-Ukrainian War; Russian invasion of Ukraine; Eastern Ukraine campaign; Pokrovsk offensive
- Website: Official website

Commanders
- Current commander: Captain Serhii Filimonov

Insignia
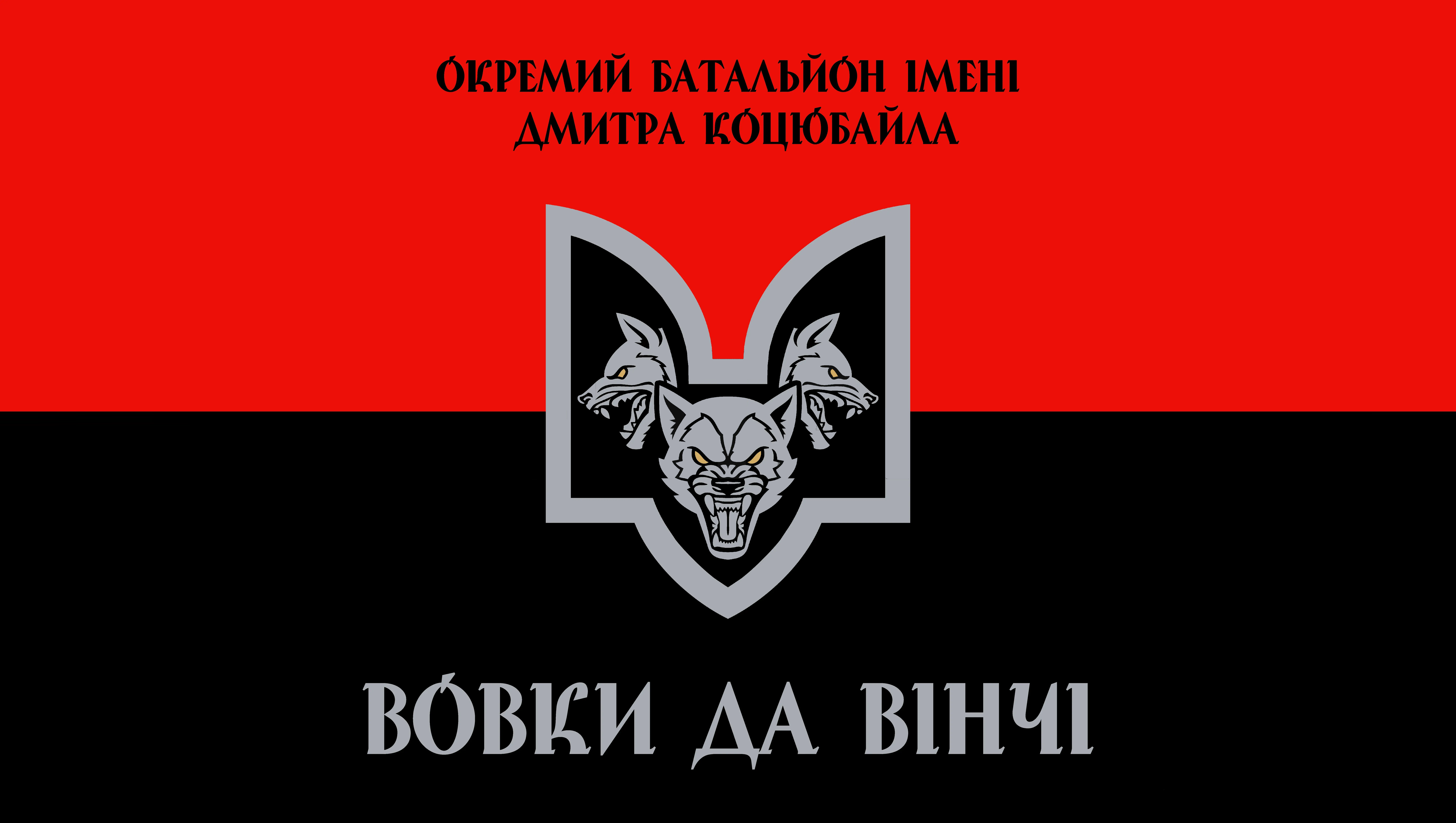
- Flag

The 108th Separate Assault Battalion "Da Vinci Wolves" (Ukrainian: 108-й окремий штурмовий батальйон «Вовки Да Вінчі») is a unit of the 59th Assault Brigade as part of the Ukrainian Unmanned Systems Forces based in Haisyn. The battalion's 'Honor' and 'Ulf' units were formerly a part of the 1st Assault Battalion of the 67th Mechanized Brigade until they departed from it to form the 108th Mechanized Battalion.

== History ==
=== 2024 ===
The unit was initially formed as the 108th Mechanized Battalion in 2024. Prior to this, the 'Honor' and 'Ulf' units departed from the 1st Assault Battalion entirely. They would eventually go on to form the 108th Mechanized Battalion, which would then join the 59th Motorized Brigade.

=== 2025 ===
In March 2025, following the 59th Motorized Brigade's reformation into an assault unit in the Unmanned Systems Forces, the battalion was also reformed into an assault battalion, becoming the 108th Assault Battalion.

== Structure ==
As of 2025, the battalion's structure is as follows:

- 108th Assault Battalion "Da Vinci Wolves"
  - 1st Assault Company
  - 2nd Assault Company "Honor"
  - 3rd Assault Company “Siromantsi”. Commander: "Pysar"
  - Shkval Company
  - Unmanned Aerial Systems Company
    - Group "U"
  - Unmanned Ground Vehicles Platoon
  - Fire Support Company
  - Mortar Battery
  - Medical Service "Ulf". Commander: Alina Mykhailova.
  - Patronage Service
