= Oksana Kuziv =

Ukrainian writer (born 1970)

- Оксана Кузів
- Born: 10 October 1970 (age 55); Burshtyn, Ukrainian SSR, Soviet Union
- Education: University of Lviv
- Occupations: Writer, poet, journalist

Oksana Kuziv (Ukrainian: Оксана Кузів; born 10 March 1970, Burshtyn, Ivano-Frankivsk Oblast) is a Ukrainian writer, poet, and journalist. Member of the National Union of Journalists of Ukraine (2013). Wife of Bohdan, mother of Orest-Vasyl Kuziv's.

== Biography ==
Oksana Kuziv was born on 10 March 1970 in Burshtyn, Ivano-Frankivsk Oblast.

She graduated from University of Lviv with a degree in Ukrainian language and literature. She worked as a literary editor of the Salon-Plus newspaper, a proofreader for the Ivano-Frankivskyi Ohliadach and Vechirnii Ivano-Frankivsk regional newspapers, and a journalist for the Bohorodchany Raion newspaper Slovo Narodu.

== Works ==
Author of the books "Adamtso" (2014, novella), "V zakapelkakh dushi" (2015, poetry), "Nazovy mene svoieiu" (2016, prose), "SHCHEmyt" (2017, novel), "Zadyvlena v nebo" (2018, poetry), "Sobacha liubov" (2018, novel), "Yenchui svit" (2019, prose), "Prozrinnia" (2020, poetry), "Merezhyvo doli" (2020, short fiction), "Meshty dlia Hannusi" (2020), "BezsmertiIE" (2023, fairy tale for adults).

=== Adamtso ===
In 2014, Oksana Kuziv's novel Adamtso became the Book of the Year among the youth of Prykarpattia, and in 2015, it was included in the list of the 80 best books of Ukraine over the past decade according to the Ukraine Reads to Children rating. In 2016, it was staged by the Vyhoda Folk Amateur Theatre (directed by Bohdan Melnyk; Vyhoda, Kalush Raion). The theatre won the Grand Prix at the XXI All-Ukrainian Festival of Theatre Arts (Ochakiv, Mykolaiv Oblast) for the play Adamtso.

=== Nazovy mene svoieiu ===
In 2016, her second prose collection, "Nazovy mene svoieiu", was named one of the top 5 most read books at the Book Forum Lviv. The writer's work "Tainstvo" from the book is also a play of the same name by the Vyhoda Amateur Theatre (directed by Bohdan Melnyk). The theatre received an award from Ukrainian actress Rymma Ziubina at the 6th International East-West Ukrainian Theatre Festival (2019, Krakow, Poland) for the poignancy and relevance of the play's themes.

== Awards ==
- Panteleimon Kulish International Literary and Art Prize (2022)
- Ivan Franko Ivano-Frankivsk City Prize in Literature and Journalism (2023)
