= Ozeriany, Burshtyn urban hromada, Ivano-Frankivsk Raion, Ivano-Frankivsk Oblast =

Rural locality in Ivano-Frankivsk Oblast, Ukraine

Ozeriany Озеряни
- Village
- Location within Ivano-Frankivsk Oblast
- Coordinates: 49°16′40″N 24°41′30″E
- Country: Ukraine
- Oblast: Ivano-Frankivsk Oblast
- Raion: Ivano-Frankivsk Raion

Population (2001)
  - Total: 447

Ozeriany (Ukrainian: Озеряни) is a village in Ivano-Frankivsk Raion of Ivano-Frankivsk Oblast, Ukraine. It belongs to Burshtyn urban hromada, one of the hromadas of Ukraine.

== History ==
Ozeriany was mentioned on 9 November 1444, in the books of the Galician court.

In 1939, the village had 610 inhabitants (590 Ukrainians, 10 Latins, 10 Jews).

Until 18 July 2020, Ozeriany belonged to Halych Raion. The raion was abolished in July 2020 as part of the administrative reform of Ukraine, which reduced the number of raions of Ivano-Frankivsk Oblast to six. The area of Halych Raion was merged into Ivano-Frankivsk Raion.

== Famous people ==
- Bohdan Kuziv (born 1965), Ukrainian painter, graphic artist
