= Orest-Vasyl Kuziv =

Ukrainian artist (born 1997)

- Орест-Василь Богданович Кузів
- Born: Orest-Vasyl Bohdanovych Kuziv; 13 January 1997 (age 29); Ivano-Frankivsk
- Education: National Academy of Visual Arts and Architecture, Lviv National Academy of Arts
- Occupation: Artist

Orest-Vasyl Bohdanovych Kuziv (Ukrainian: Орест-Василь Богданович Кузів; born 13 January 1997) is a Ukrainian artist and member of the National Union of Artists of Ukraine. Son of Bohdan and Oksana Kuziv.

== Biography ==
Orest-Vasyl Kuziv was born on 13 January 1997 in Ivano-Frankivsk.

He graduated from the Faculty of Fine Arts and Restoration of the National Academy of Fine Arts and Architecture (2018, workshop of the People's Artist of Ukraine Vasyl Zabashta), and received a master's degree from the Faculty of Fine Arts and Restoration of the Lviv National Academy of Arts (2020).

Volunteered during the full-scale Russian invasion of Ukraine.

== Creativity ==
Author of more than 1000 paintings. His works are kept in private collections in Ukraine, Germany, and the USA.

=== Personal exhibitions ===
- 2024 – Magic of the Night, Center for Contemporary Art, Ivano-Frankivsk
- 2020 – Kopychky, Bastion Fortress Gallery, Ivano-Frankivsk
- 2019 – My Horizon, Bastion Fortress Gallery, Ivano-Frankivsk
- 2018 – Towards the light, Museum of Arts of Prykarpattia, Ivano-Frankivsk
- 2013 – Together on the path of painting, Ivano-Frankivsk (together with his father Bohdan)
