= Bohdan Kuziv =

Ukrainian painter, graphic artist (born 1965)

- Богдан Богданович Кузів
- Born: Bohdan Bohdanovych Kuziv; 4 December 1965 (age 60); Ozeriany, Ukrainian SSR, Soviet Union
- Education: Precarpathian National University
- Occupations: Painter, graphic artist
- Awards: Merited Painter of Ukraine

Bohdan Bohdanovych Kuziv (Ukrainian: Богдан Богданович Кузів; born 4 December 1965) is a Ukrainian painter, graphic artist, and member of the National Union of Artists of Ukraine (2012).

== Biography ==
Bohdan Kuziv was born on 4 December 1965 in Ozeriany, now the Burshtyn Hromada of Ivano-Frankivsk Raion, Ivano-Frankivsk Oblast.

In 1994, he graduated from the Faculty of Art and Graphic Arts of the Precarpathian National University (Ivano-Frankivsk, teachers M. Kanius, M. Figol). He worked in Poland (1995–1999), as well as studied and worked as an artist in Rome (2001).

From 2004, he has been a participant in regional, national, and international exhibitions. These include personal exhibitions: Ivano-Frankivsk (2010, 2013, 2015, 2025), Chernivtsi (2011), Halych (2011), Athens (Greece, 2012), and Lviv (2018). Several works are kept in the Museum of Arts of Prykarpattia (Ivano-Frankivsk).

Kuziv is married to Oksana Kuziv, and is the father of Orest-Vasyl Kuziv.

== Awards ==
- Merited Painter of Ukraine (23 August 2025)
- International Art Prize named after Ilya Repin (2021) for his picturesque glorification of the beauty of his native land and Ukraine
- Ivano-Frankivsk Regional Yaroslav Lukavetskyi Prize (2015)
- Diploma of the winner of the International Art Plein Air Contest "The Best artist – 2019"
- Medal for the Revival of Ukraine
