= Ozeriany, Chortkiv Raion =

Ozeriany Озеряни
- Village
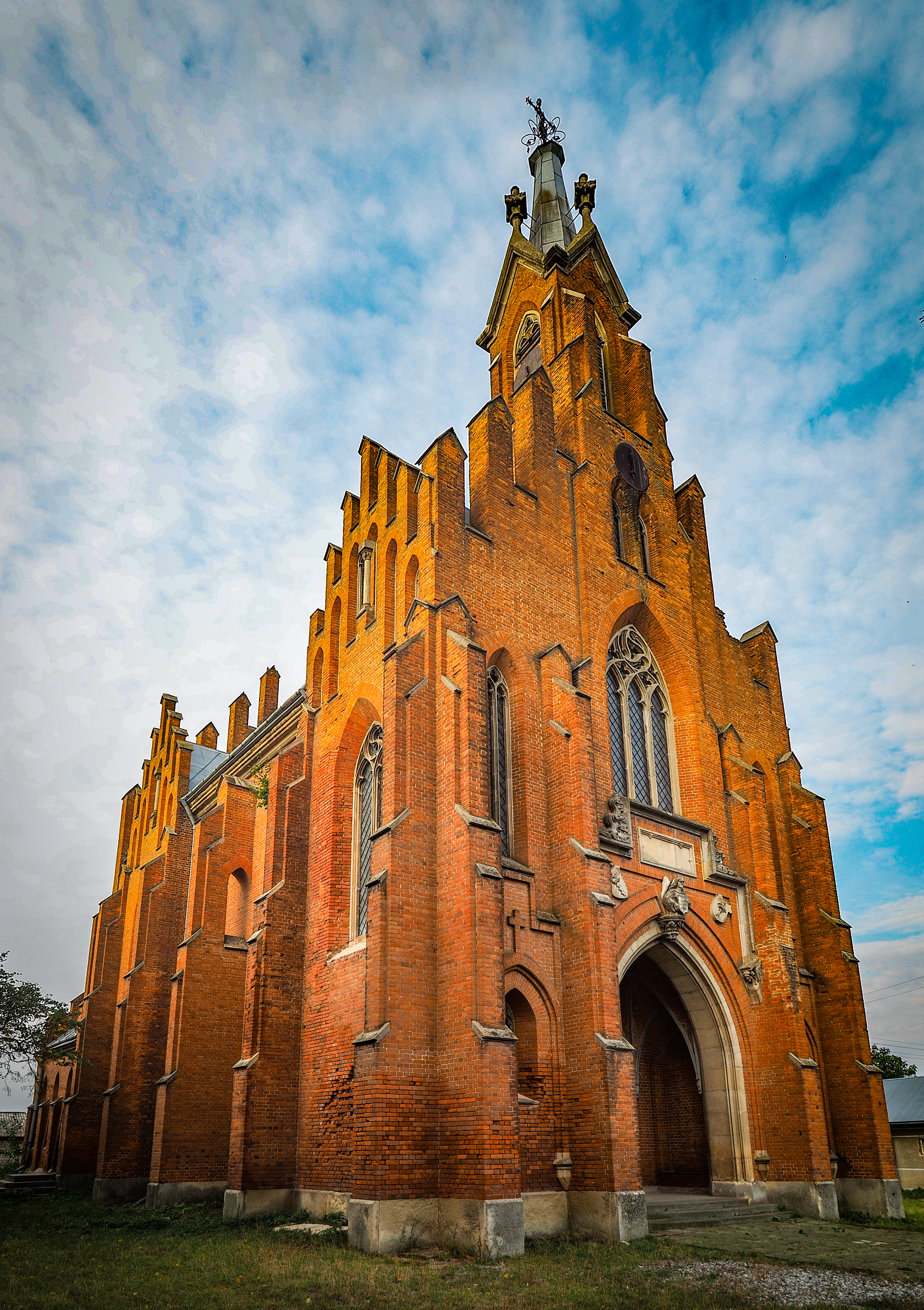
- Church of Saint Anne

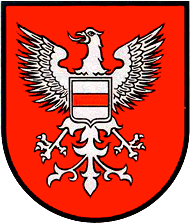
- Coat of arms

- Location in Ukraine Ozeriany (Ukraine)
- Coordinates: 48°52′42″N 25°56′52″E
- Country: Ukraine
- Oblast: Ternopil Oblast
- District: Chortkiv Raion

Population
  - Total: 1,585
- Time zone: UTC+2 (EET)
  - Summer (DST): UTC+3 (EEST)
- Postal code: 48722

Ozeriany (Ukrainian: Озеряни, Polish: Jezierzany, Yiddish: אָזשעראַן, romanized: Uziran or Aziran), a village in Ukraine, is located within Chortkiv Raion of Ternopil Oblast. It belongs to Borshchiv urban hromada, one of the hromadas of Ukraine.
