= Kinga Augustyn =

Polish musician

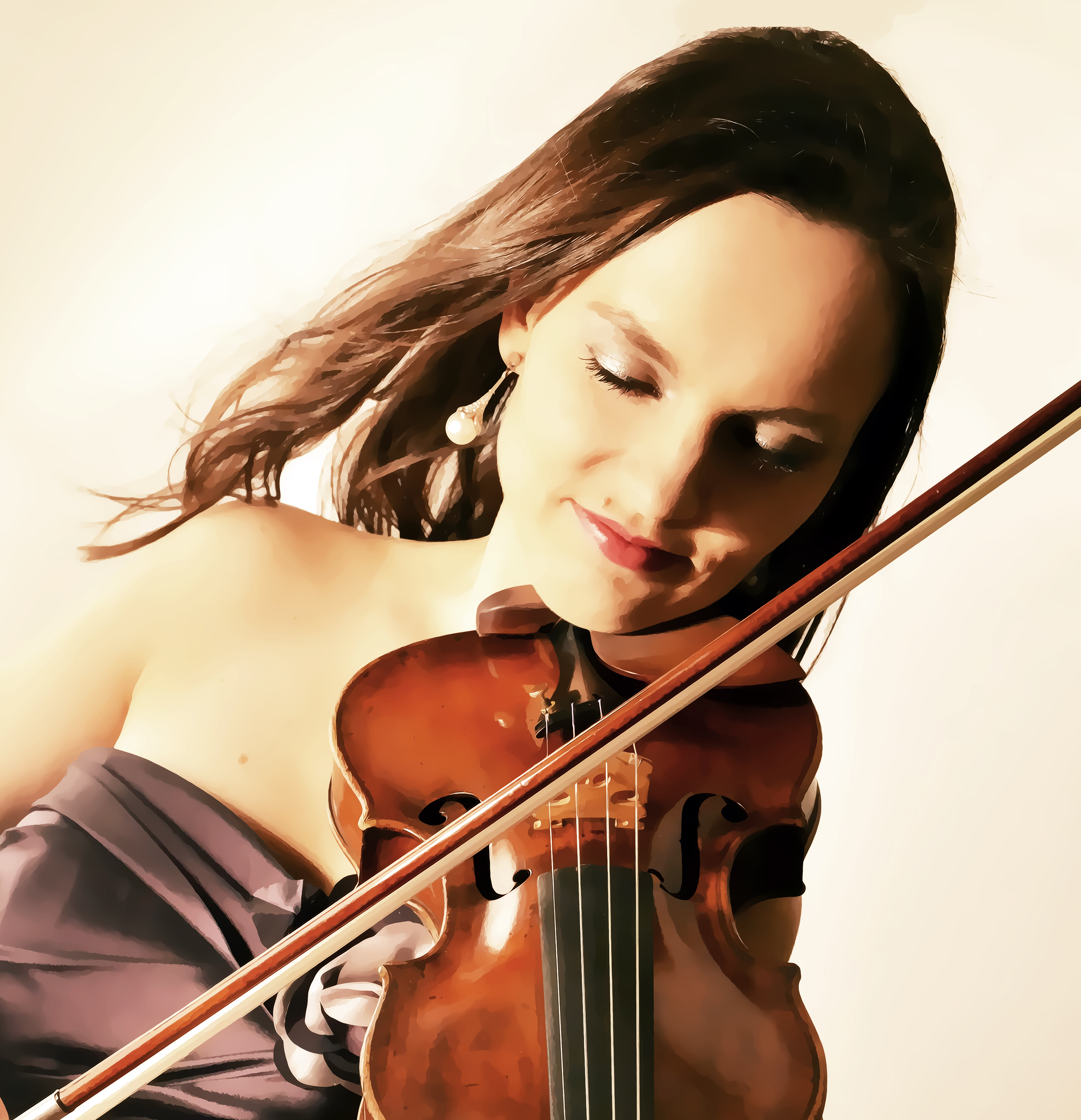
- Augustyn in 2013
- Education: The Juilliard School (Bachelors/Masters); State University of New York, Stony Brook (Doctor of Musical Arts)
- Occupation: Concert Violinist

Kinga Augustyn is a New York City-based virtuoso violinist. She has established an international career having performed as a soloist with numerous orchestras, recitalist, and recording artist.

== Early life and education ==
Augustyn was born in Wrocław, Poland into a family of professional musicians. Her father, Roman Augustyn, was a bassoonist with the Wrocław Opera Orchestra. He died at age 33. Her mother, Mariola Augustyn, is a professional singer (spinto soprano), music and speech therapist, and actress. Her younger brother, Jakub Augustyn, is a professional jazz guitarist.

Augustyn's formal violin training started at the age of seven. She attended Państwowa Podsawowa Szkola Muzyczna (now Ogólnokształcąca Szkoła Muzyczna I Stopnia) im. Karola Szymanowskiego in Wrocław, where she studied violin with Aleksandra Bogdan for six years. She then enrolled in Państwowe Liceum Muzyczne (now Ogólnokształcąca Szkoła Muzyczna II Stopnia) im. Karola Szymanowskiego in Wrocław as a student of Zbigniew Szuflat. She graduated a year earlier than expected, having completed her baccalaureate exam. During her last year there, she was also a Jungstudentin at Hochschule für Musik und Theater in Rostock, Germany, where she studied violin with Petru Munteanu.

At the age of 18, Augustyn came to the United States to continue her musical education at The Juilliard School. She studied with Dorothy DeLay (teacher to several renowned soloists such as Itzhak Perlman, Gil Shaham, and Midori Goto), Naoko Tanaka and Cho-Liang Lin. After receiving her Bachelors and master's degrees, she received a Doctorate degree (Doctor of Musical Arts) from the State University of New York, Stony Brook, where she coached violin and chamber music with Pamela Frank, Philip Setzer (violinist of the Grammy Award-winning Emerson String Quartet), and Gilbert Kalish. Upon completion of her education, she settled permanently in the United States to pursue a solo concert career. She has dual citizenship: Polish (hence European Union) and US.

== Music career ==
Augustyn has been a soloist with the Wrocław Philharmonic, Chamber Orchestra Leopoldinum, Magdeburg Philharmonic, Riverside Symphonia, Acadiana Symphonie, Glacier Symphony, Queens Symphony Orchestra, Deutsches Kammerorchestrer Berlin, and Manhattan Symphonie. With the Manhattan Symphonie she toured China, making her Asian debut in 2014 at the Beijing Poly Theater and Shanghai Oriental Art Center.

Augustyn made her Carnegie Hall (Weill Recital Hall) recital debut in 2008 as a winner of Artist International Presentations, Inc. She has performed solo at Carnegie's Stern Auditorium, as well as at other venues in the USA such as Alice Tully Hall, Metropolitan Museum of Art, and the Chicago Cultural Center. She has collaborated in performances of Johann Sebastian Bach's Chaconne with the New York City-based José Limón Dance Company. She often collaborates with contemporary composers and has premiered and/or made world premiere recordings of works by Kenneth Fuchs, Cynthia Lee Wong, Jakub Ciupiński, Michael White, Piotr Drożdżewski, Krzysztof Penderecki and Debra Kay

Augustyn is a prize winner of music competitions that include first prizes at the Alexander and Buono International String Competition in New York City in 2009, Artist International Presentations in New York City in 2007, and Konkurs Bachowski, in Zielona Góra, Poland In 1999. She received Fourth Prize and Special Audience Award, the 8th International Brahms Competition in Pörtschach, Austria in 2001; Fourth Prize and Award for Best Interpretation of a Virtuosic Work, Kloster Schöntal International Competition, Germany in 1999. She was a 2014 recipient of the Emerging Artist Award from the Sorel Organization and a 2015 winner of the "Outstanding Pole Abroad" contest in the United States, in the category "Young Pole" from the Polish Promotional Emblem Foundation.

In 2012, Augustyn recorded as part of Trio21 with Robert deMaine (principal cellist with the Los Angeles Philharmonic), cello, and Jeffrey Biegel, piano, The Runaway Bunny, the contemporary children's classic by Emmy award winner, Glen Roven. Narration of the story was performed by Oscar winner Catherine Zeta-Jones.

In 2016 Augustyn released on the RovenRecords label, the 24 Caprices for Solo Violin, Op. 1 by Niccolo Paganini. Written between 1802 and 1817, the 24 Caprices are considered among the most challenging and technically demanding works for the solo violin, and have inspired many prominent composers, including Chopin, Schumann, Berlioz, Brahms, Sarasate, Liszt, and Sibelius. Augustyn's recording of the 24 Caprices has been praised not only for its technical accomplishment, but also for its superior musical interpretation.

Augustyn marked her symphonic recording debut with the release on Centaur Records performing violin concertos by Bruch, Mendelssohn, and Massenet with the Janacek Philharmonic Orchestra conducted by Jakub Klecker. In 2018 her second orchestral recording was released, featuring music by Polish composer Romuald Twardowski recorded with Toruń Symphony Orchestra conducted by Mariusz Smolij.

Augustyn also performs baroque violin and has performed in masterclasses held by William Christie (musician) and his baroque ensemble Les Arts Florissants, as well as by Cynthia Roberts.

Augustyn has recorded for Naxos Records, GPR Records, RovenRecords, Albany Records, and Centaur Records. She plays on a mid-18th century violin made by Giuseppe Gagliano in Naples, generously on loan to her from a private collector.

Augustyn was the Artistic Director of the XXI International Chopin & Friends Festival 2019 sponsored by the New York Dance and Arts Innovations (NYDAI), a New York City-based not-for-profit organization with the aim of multi-national creative support and promotion of the performing, visual, and literary arts.

She released two albums in 2021: solo album Turning in Time and La Pasion, featuring 6 Solo Violin Tango-Etudes by Astor Piazzolla.

== Interest in lesser-known works ==
In addition to collaboration with contemporary composers, Augustyn has performed and recorded works by lesser-known composers, as well as lesser-known works by prominent composers of the past. She is the first person to record all violin and piano works by the 19th century composer, Aleksander Zarzycki, who was mainly known for his Mazurka in G Major, Op. 26 that was frequently performed by David Oistrakh. Other world premiere recordings include works by Henryk Gorecki, P. Drożdżewski, and Karol Lipinski. In 2018, Augustyn's second orchestral release was a performance of works by the Polish composer, Romuald Twardowski. The recording was released by Naxos Records and includes Twardowski's Violin Concerto (2006).

== Discography ==
Michael White Quartet for Piano and Strings (Albany Records 2010)

- Mirian Conti, Piano; Kinga Augustyn, Violin; Andy Lin, Viola; Andrew Janss, Cello

Glen Roven: The Runaway Bunny Concerto with Reader (GPR Records 2012)

- Catherine Zeta-Jones, Reader; Kinga Augustyn, Violin; Robert deMaine, Cello; Jeffrey Biegel, Piano

Polish Violin Music (Naxos Records 2013)

- Works by A. Zarzycki, Z. Noskowski, P. Drożdżewski, H. M. Górecki, W. Lutosławski, K. Lipiński
- Kinga Augustyn, Violin; Efi Hackmey, Piano

Michael White Trio Sonata (iTunes 2013)

- Kinga Augustyn, Violin; Jecca Barry, Flute; Alexandra Snyder Dunbar, Harpsichord

Kenneth Fuchs Falling Trio (Naxos Records 2013)

- Kinga Augustyn, Violin; Robert deMaine, Cello; Jeffrey Biegel, Piano

The Romantic Violin Live! (iTunes 2015)

- Works by F. Kreisler, F. Chopin, J. Brahms, B. Bartók, P. de Sarasate, E. Ysaye, C. Saint-Saëns, H. Wieniawski, J. Massenet
- Kinga Augustyn, Violin; Evan Solomon, Piano

Keys to the City (RovenRecords 2016)

- Track: "55th Street Bop" by Glen Roven
- Kinga Augustyn, Violin; Kristina Reiko Cooper, Cello; Glen Roven, Piano

Niccolò Paganini 24 Caprices for Solo Violin, Op. 1 (RovenRecords 2016)

- Kinga Augustyn, Violin

Violin Concertos (Centaur Records 2017)

- Max Bruch: Violin Concerto No. 1
- Felix Mendelssohn: Violin Concerto
- Jules Massenet: Meditation from Thais
- Kinga Augustyn, Violin
- Janáček Philharmonic Orchestra, Jakub Klecker, conductor

Georg Philipp Telemann: 12 Fantasias for Solo Violin (Centaur Records 2018)

- Kinga Augustyn, Violin

Romuald Twardowski: Violin Concerto / Spanish Fantasia / Serenade / Niggunim / Capriccio in Blue (Naxos Records 2018)

- Kinga Augustyn, Violin
- Torun Symphony Orchestra, Mariusz Smolij, conductor

Turning in Time (Centaur Records 2021)

- Works by Elliott Carter, Luciano Berio, Krzysztof Penderecki, Grażyna Bacewicz, Isang Yun, and Debra Kaye
- Kinga Augustyn, Violin

La Pasión (Centaur Records 2021)

- Astor Piazzolla: Six Tango-Etudes for Solo Violin
- Kinga Augustyn, Violin
