= Attack for Bitków =

- Part of Polish-Ukrainian ethnic conflict
- Location: Bitków
- Date: 14 April 1944
- Deaths: 16 killed
- Victim: Polish civilians
- Perpetrator: Ukrainian Insurgent Army
- Motive: massacres of Poles in Volhynia and Eastern Galicia

Attack for Bitków - an attack on a Polish settlement (administratively belonging to the village of Bitków) located in the Nadwórnia district of the Stanisławów Voivodeship by a branch of the Ukrainian Insurgent Army (UPA) on 14 April 1944.

Poles in Bitków lived in a separate settlement; many of them worked in the local oil mine. Armed German or Hungarian protection of the mine gave a sense of security to the Polish residents, who were threatened with ethnic cleansing by Ukrainian nationalists. Some of the Poles working in the mine also received weapons as protection.

In the second decade of April 1944, the Germans left Bitków in the face of the advancing Soviet offensive. The Ukrainian Insurgent Army (UPA) decided to take advantage of the chaos in the near-front zone to attack the Poles.April 14, 1944. The UPA cut off the town from the world by blowing up bridges and cutting off telephone communication, and then attacked with a force of 85 people. The Poles put up effective resistance and after a few hours the attackers withdrew at the sound of shots fired in their direction by the Soviet unit, which had reached nearby Pniów at that time.

According to testimonies collected by the Association for the Commemoration of Victims of Crimes of Ukrainian Nationalists in Wrocław, the armed Poles put up effective resistance. After several hours of fighting, the attackers retreated to the sound of shots fired in their direction by a Soviet unit that had reached nearby Pniów at the time. According to witnesses, one Pole was killed as a result of the battle. The next day, the Soviet unit entered Bitków. The Committee of Eastern Territories in its report reported 1 dead and 4 wounded Poles.

According to the UPA report, 100 Poles and 40 "Bolsheviks" were killed during this attack. The UPA's own losses were said to be 2 dead and 2 wounded.

Later, as a result of individual assaults under different circumstances, 15 Poles from Bitków were killed by the UPA.

== See also ==
- Sahryń massacre
