= Ivan Domaratsky =

Russian composer

External videos
- Partess Concert No. 11 "The Lord Delivers the Messenger"

Ivan Domaratsky (Ukrainian: Іван Домарацький; fl. first half of the 18th century) was a Ukrainian composer of Baroque music, who wrote partsong concerts and liturgies. Long forgotten by music historians, he was rediscovered by the Ukrainian musicologist Nina Herasymova-Persydska, who attributed his compositions to the 1730s and 1740s.

Domaratsky's works were largely unknown until the 21st century, when the Kyiv Chamber Choir began to perform them, in particular concertos No. 8 "O Thee, Father Roman", and No. 10 "Your Good Spirit". Manuscripts of his works are kept at the Vernadsky National Library of Ukraine and the collection of St Sophia Cathedral, Kyiv within sets of partsong ('partess') concerts. Among the manuscripts are (in Church Slavonic) his "Concerto to the Apostle Timothy", "A wonderful catcher like his tongue", the concerto "Virgin gives birth to the Most Holy", "The Lord sent deliverance", a concert for eight voices "Blessed is the man who fears the Lord", "Hymns for an All-Night Vigil", and Blessed is the man".
