= Romuald Twardowski =

Polish composer (1930–2024)

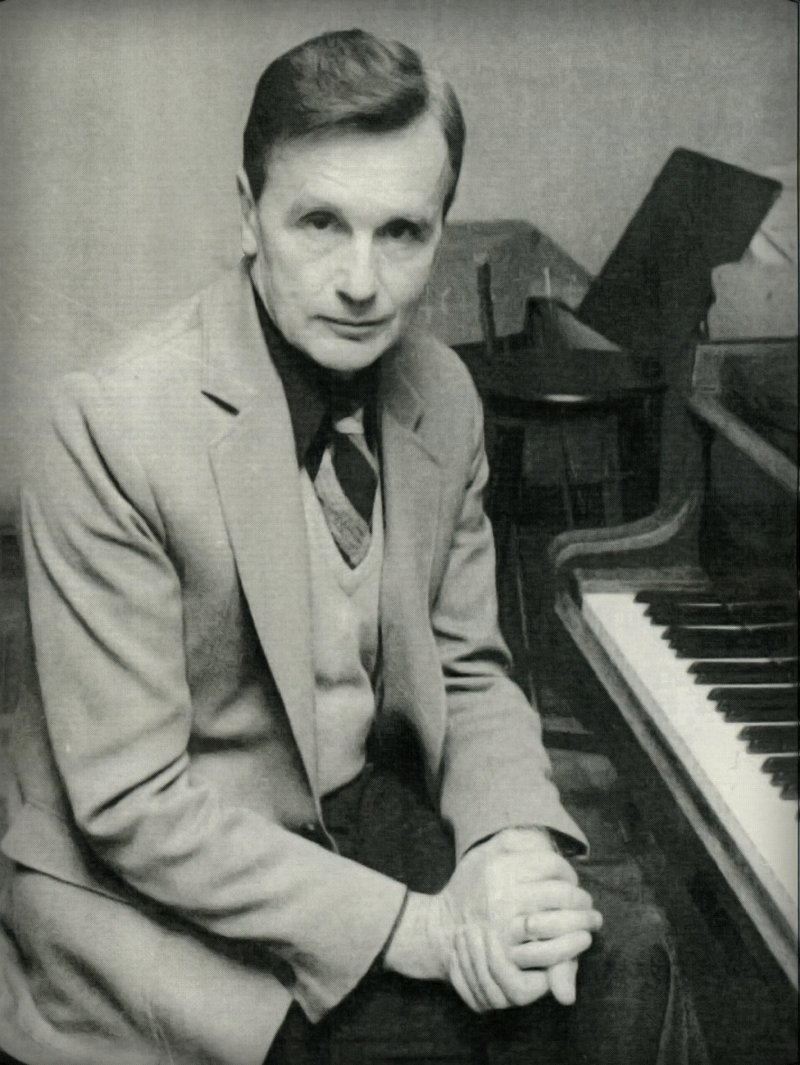
- Born: 17 June 1930; Wilno, Second Polish Republic
- Died: 13 January 2024 (aged 93); Warsaw, Poland
- Occupations: Composer; Pianist; Organist; Academic teacher
- Organizations: Warsaw State Academy of Music
- Awards: Order of Polonia Restituta; Gloria Artis Medal for Merit to Culture

Romuald Twardowski (Polish pronunciation: [rɔˈmu.alt tfarˈdɔfskʲi]; 17 June 1930 – 13 January 2024) was a Polish composer, pianist, organist and academic teacher who studied in Vilnius, Warsaw and Paris. In a style described as "developed neoclassicism", he composed operas, ballets, instrumental music and vocal works, especially sacred music for both Catholic use and the Orthodox Church. He achieved international prizes for his compositions, and many works were recorded in anthologies, including the Violin Concerto, chamber music, and sacred and secular choral music such as the Liturgy of St. John Chrysostom. He was professor at the State Academy of Music in Warsaw from 1972 to 2008.

== Life and career ==
Twardowski was born in Vilnius (then Wilno in Poland) on 17 June 1930. During years of occupation and World War II, he studied the violin; after the war, he began learning to play the piano and organ. From 1946 to 1950, he was the organist at the Church of St. Johns in Vilnius. From 1952 to 1957, he studied piano and composition at the Conservatory of Vilnius, with Povilas Tamuliūnas and Julius Juzeliūnas. He was an early member of the folklore ensemble Wilia, founded in 1955, focused on Polish folk music.

He moved to Warsaw to continue his studies at the Warsaw Academy of Music from 1957 to 1960, with Bolesław Woytowicz. On a scholarship of the Polish Composers' Union, he studied in Paris with Nadia Boulanger in 1963 and returned in 1966, with a focus on Gregorian chant and medieval polyphony.

He created major works for the stage in the 1960s; his first opera, Cyrano de Bergerac, based on Rostand's play, was premiered at the Silesian Opera in Bytom in 1963, directed by Zbigniew Sawa and conducted by Włodzimierz Ormicki. He created the operas Tragedy, or the Story of John and Herod (1965) and Lord Jim after Joseph Conrad's novel (1973), and the ballets The Naked Prince (1960) and Wizard's Sculptures (1963). They were staged in Łódź and Warsaw. In the 1980s, he composed two more operas; Maria Stuart was premiered at the Grand Theatre, Łódź in 1981, staged by Maria Fołtyn. History of St. Catherine was premiered at the Grand Theatre, Warsaw in 1985, and produced two years later at the Baltic State Opera in Gdańsk. His operas were also performed in Czechoslovakia, Finland, Germany and Yugoslavia.

From 1972 to 2008 Twardowski was a professor at the State Academy of Music in Warsaw, teaching composition and instrumentation. He served as jury member of many choir competitions. He was president of the Orthodox Music Foundation, organizing the International Orthodox Music Festival Hajnówka in Białystok and chairing its jury from 1983.

He published an autobiography in 2000, Było, nie minęło: wspomnienia kompozytora (Been, not Gone: A Composer's Memories), about his creative work, people and events of his life.

Twardowski died in Warsaw on 13 January 2024, at the age of 93.

== Awards ==
Twardowski achieved international prizes for his compositions, including:

- 1st prize of Polish Young Composers competition for the 1961 Antifone per tre gruppi d'orchestra
- 2nd prize of UNESCO International Composers' Tribune in Paris (1963)
- Grand Prix in Monaco, in 1965 for his 1963 Sorcerer's Sculptures and in 1973 for Lord Jim
- 1st prize of the 1966 Prague Spring International Music Festival for the 1965 Sonetti di Petrarca per tenore solo e due cori a cappella
- prize of the West European Federation of Choral Societies (AGEC) for Mały koncert in 1994

He was awarded honours of the Order of Polonia Restituta, the Knight's Cross in 1974, the Officer's Cross in 1985 and the Commander's Cross in 2020. He received the American Paderewski Award in 2006, and the Gloria Artis Medal for Merit to Culture in Gold in 2010. Albums with his works were nominated several times for the Fryderyk Music Award. The State Music School in Puławy and the Municipal Music School in Gostynin bear his name.

== Compositions ==
Twardowski worked in many genres, opera and ballet, concertante instrumental music for large and small ensembles, choral music both sacred and secular, chamber music and songs, composing about 200 works. He composed sacred music for the Catholic church, but also for the Orthodox Church, specifically the Chamber Choir Kyiv conducted by his friend Mykola Hobdych. His musical style has been called "developed neoclassicism", and his choral works as "very varied and, although moderately modern, very accessible music", "pure and beautiful". His music has been described as "very clear and communicative, full of internal drama and individual in its character".

His major compositions include:

- Oberek (version I) for violin and piano (1955)
- Oberek (version II) for string orchestra (1955)
- Suite in the Old Style for orchestra (1957)
- Seven Folk Songs for voice and piano (1957)
- Small Sonata for piano (1958)
- Small Symphony for piano, strings and percussion (1959)
- Song of the White House, cantata for mixed choir, 2 pianos and percussion (1959)
- Songs of Spring (version I) for female or boys choir (1959)
- Songs of Spring (version II) for male choir (1959)
- Maple-tree Songs for mixed choir (1960)
- Nocturnes for mixed choir (1960)
- Lullabies for mixed choir (1960)
- The Naked Prince, ballet-pantomime (1960)
- Warmia Suite for mixed choir (1960)
- "A Warmia Lullaby" for voice and piano (1960)
- Carmina de mortuis for mixed choir (1961)
- Antifone for three groups of orchestra (1961)
- Bucolics for mixed choir (1962)
- Cantus antiqui for soprano, harpsichord, piano and percussion (1962)
- Cyrano de Bergerac, romantic opera (1962)
- Nomopedia Cinque movimenti for orchestra (1962)
- Psalmus 149, setting Psalm 148 for mixed choir (1962)
- Small Suite for violin and piano (1962)
- April Songs for mixed choir (1963)
- Sorcerer's Sculptures (Sculptures by Master Piotr), ballet-pantomime (1963)
- Miniatures for mixed choir (1964)
- Ode 64 for orchestra (1964)
- Parabolas, pantomime (1964)
- Two Blackman Songs for mixed choir (1965)
- Tragedy or the Story of John and Herod, morality opera (1965)
- Sonetti di Petrarca for tenor solo and two choruses a cappella (1965)
- Tre studi secondo Giotto for chamber orchestra (1966)
- Impressioni fiorentini for four choirs instrumental (1967)
- Capricci for piano (1967)
- Little Orthodox Liturgy for vocal ensemble and 3 instrumental groups (1968)
- Ode to Youth for reciting voice, mixed choir and orchestra (1969)
- The Fall of Father Suryn, radio musical drama (1969)
- Lord Jim, musical drama (1970–73)
- Three Farewell Sonnets (version I) for bass-baritone and chamber orchestra (1971)
- Three Farewell Sonnets (version II) for bass-baritone and piano (1971)
- Two Playful Songs (version I) for mixed choir (1972)
- Two Playful Songs (version II) for female or boys choir (1972)
- Prelude, toccata and chorale, for symphony orchestra (1973)
- Triptych of the St Mary's Church for string orchestra (1973)
- Preludio e toccata for mixed choir (1974)
- A Study in A for orchestra (1974)
- Improvvisazione e toccata for two pianos (1974)
- Two Landscapes for symphony orchestra (1975)
- Sea Impressions for mixed choir (1975)
- Polish Landscape (version I) for bass-baritone and symphony orchestra (1975)
- Polish Landscape (version II) for bass-baritone and piano (1975)
- Laudate Dominum, a dialogue for two mixed choirs (1976)
- Sequentiae de SS. Patronis Polonis" for baritone, choir and instrumental ensemble (1977)
- My Sword is My Hand, three poems for solo tenor and mixed choir (1977)
- Maria Stuart, musical drama (1978)
- Capriccio in Blue for violin and orchestra (or piano) (1979)
- Lamentationes for mixed choir (1979)
- Face of the Sea, five songs for bass-baritone and piano (1979)
- Preludio, recitativo ed aria con variazioni, for harpsichord (piano) (1979)
- Sonata breve for harpsichord (piano) (1979)
- Village Concert for mixed choir (1980)
- Musica concertante for piano (1980)
- Small Concerto for piano and instrumental ensemble (1980)
- On Four Strings for violin and piano (1980)
- Three Songs from Kurpie for mixed choir (1980)
- The Story of St Catherine, musical morality (1981)
- Fantasia for organs (1982)
- Polish Fantasia for two violins (1982)
- Salve Regina, for female choir and organs (1982)
- Three Pieces for organs (1982)
- Ave Maris Stella (version I) for make choir and organs (or piano) (1982)
- Erotics for voice and piano (1983)
- Joannes Rex, cantata for baritone, mixed choir and orchestra (1983)
- Piano Concerto (1984)
- Fun Fair for piano (1984)
- Spanish Fantasia (version I) for violin and orchestra (or piano) (1985)
- Spanish Fantasia (version II) for cello and piano (1985)
- Little Triptych for wind quintet (1986)
- Three Frescoes for symphony orchestra (1986)
- Allegro rustico, for oboe and piano (1986)
- Symphonic Variations on a Theme of George Gershwin for solo percussion and orchestra (1986)
- The Kitten and the Dragon, seven songs for voice and piano (1986)
- Piano Trio (1987)
- Old Polish Concerto for string orchestra (1987)
- Three Songs to words of Stanisław Ryszard Dobrowolski for baritone and piano (1987)
- Small Concert for vocal orchestra (1988)
- Lithuanian Variations for flute, oboe, clarinet, horn and bassoon (1988)
- Michael Angelo Sonnets for baritone and piano (1988)
- Bell Symphonies for piano (1988–91)
- Italian Album for orchestra (1989)
- Old Polish Dance for three guitars (1989)
- Espressioni for violin and piano (1990)
- Alleluia for mixed choir (1990)
- Chwalitie Imia Gospodina (Praise the Name of the Lord) (version I) for mixed choir (1990)
- Three Sonnets to Don Quixote for bass-baritone and piano (1990)
- By the Neris for baritone and piano (1990)
- Niggunim, Hassidic melodies for violin and symphony orchestra (or piano) (1991)
- Tu es Petrus, for baritone, mixed choir and symphony orchestra (1991)
- Hosanna I for mixed choir (1992)
- Pleiades for violin and piano (1993)
- Teenage Trio for violin, cello and piano (1993)
- St Mary's Songs for soprano and small symphony orchestra (1993)
- Sonatina for two violins (1993)
- Canticum Canticorum for soprano, flute, clarinet and strings (1994)
- Cello Concerto (1995)
- Wsjakoje dychanije (All Breath) for mixed choir (1996)
- Invocation and Capriccio for two cellos (1996)
- Regina coeli for mixed choir (1996)
- In the Green Grove, five miniatures for piano 4-hands (1996)
- Hosanna II for mixed choir (1997)
- Concerto breve for string orchestra (1998)
- To You Władyka for mixed choir (1998)
- O gloriosa Domina for mixed choir (1999)
- Hommage a J. S. Bach, cycle of pieces for piano (2000)
- Two Christmas Carols for boys choir (2000)
- In Thy Kingdom for mixed choir (2000)
- Praise My Soul for mixed choir (2000)
- Intermezzo for piano (2000)
- Introduction and Allegro for violin and piano (2001)
- Missa "Regina caeli" for mixed choir (2001)
- Capriccio for violin and piano (2001)
- O salutaris, for mixed choir (2001)
- Jubilate Deo, for mixed choir (2001)
- Ave Maris Stella" (version II) for male choir (2002)
- Pastorals and Humoresque for oboe and piano (2002)
- Praise the Name of the Lord (version II) for male choir (2002)
- Musica festiva for organs (2002)
- In a Chinese Garden for percussion ensemble (2002)
- Toccata and Chorals for organs (2002)
- Jesus, I Trust in Thee. The Mystery of God's Mercy. for soprano, baritone, 2 reciting voices, mixed choir and orchestra (2002)
- Im Zoo for violin and piano (2002)
- The Elegant Hedgehog and the Hoopoe for voice and piano (2002)
- Three Sketches for violin, viola and cello (2003)
- Serenade for string orchestra (2003–2004)
- Three Intermezzos for organs (2004)
- Summer with Dad for voice and piano (2004)
- Tango for cello and piano (2004)
- Meditation for cello and piano (2004)
- Campane IV from the Bell Symphonies cycle for piano (2004)
- The White Eagle for voice and piano (2004)
- Pater noster for mixed choir (2005)
- The Paschal Triptych for organs (2005)
- Piano Trio No. 2 (2005)
- Our Father, for mixed choir (2005)
- Concerto for Violin and String Orchestra (2006)
- Mysterium crucis for a cappella mixed choir (2006)
- Popule meus for mixed choir (2006)

== Recordings ==
Works by Twardowski were recorded, mostly in anthologies grouped by genre by the Polish label Acte Préalable (AP), including:

- 2000: Choral Orthodox Works, AP0058
- 2000: Solo, Chamber and Vocal Works, AP0059
- 2001: Gaude Mater Festival – 3 – Polish Mass, AP0098
- 2001: Musica Polonica Nova – Warsaw Composers 1, AP0100
- 2002: Complete Works for Violin and Piano, AP0089
- 2003: Missa Regina caeli, AP0090
- 2004: Complete Piano Works, AP0066
- 2004: Musica Polonica Nova – Warsaw Composers 2, AP0108
- 2004: Concertos, AP0110
- 2005: Works for String Orchestra, AP0120
- 2006: Chamber Music, AP0140
- 2008: Complete Organ Works, AP0175
- 2008: Concertos, AP0179
- 2008: Liturgy of St. John Chrysostom, Roman Puchko (tenor, priest), Petro Hrekov (bass, deacon), Chamber Choir "Kyiv", conducted by Mykola Hobdych, AP0193
- 2009: Exegi monumentum, AP0231
- 2011: Universitas Cantat 1998–2011, AP0295-99
- 2017: Luctus (Żałość), AP0378
- 2017: Violin Concerto, Kinga Augustyn (violin), Toruń Symphony Orchestra, conducted by Mariusz Smolij, Naxos
- 2018: In the Night's Stillness, AP0440
- 2019: Sacrum · Profanum, sacred and secular choral music, Czestochowa Philharmonic Choir Collegium Cantorum, Janusz Siadlak
