= Nina Herasymova-Persydska =

Ukrainian musicologist (1927–2020)

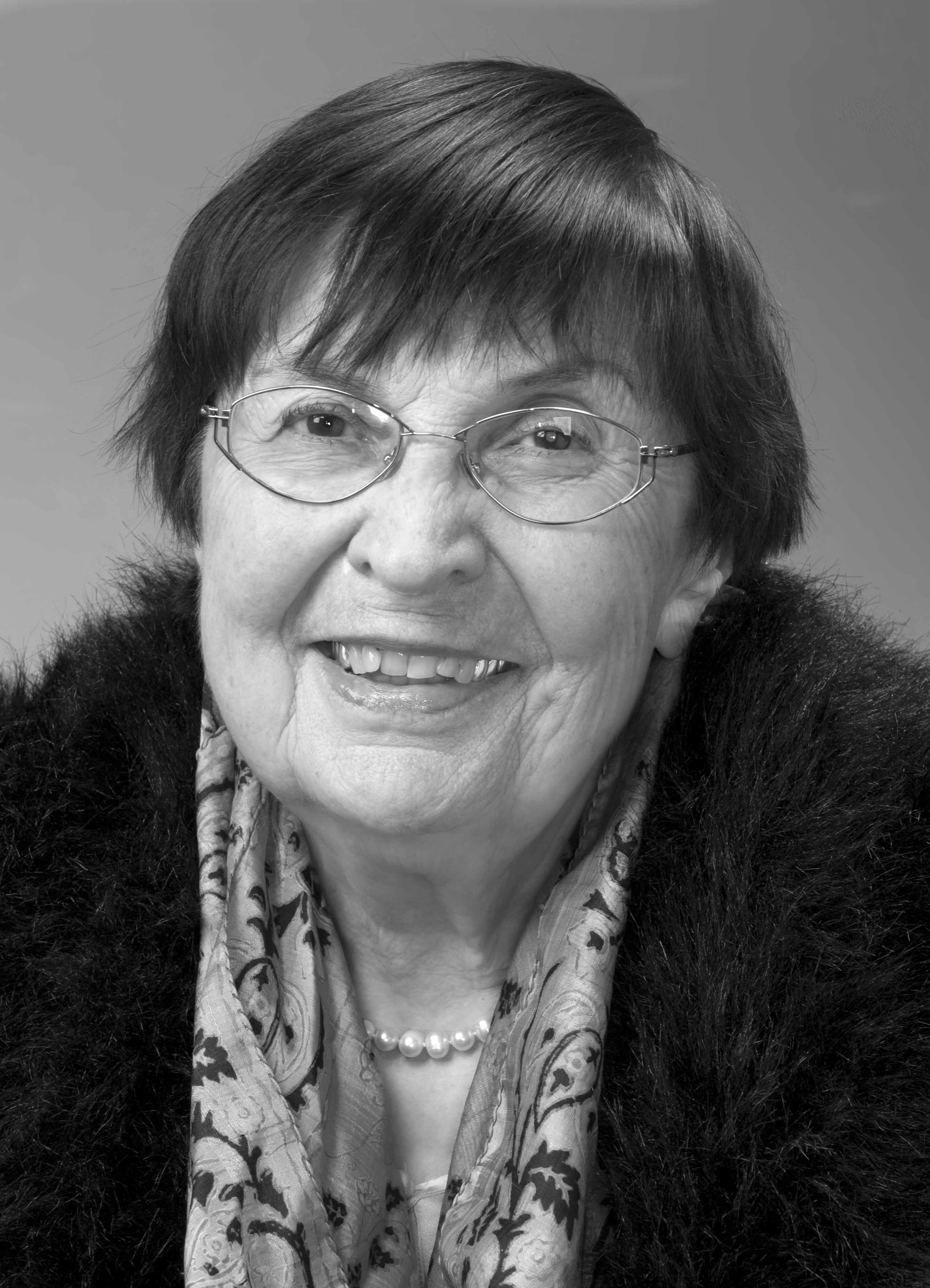
- Born: Nina Oleksandrivna Herasymova-Persydska; December 23, 1927. Kyiv, USSR
- Died: December 8, 2020 (aged 92); Kyiv, Ukraine
- Occupation: musicologist

Nina Oleksandrivna Herasymova-Persydska (Ukrainian: Ніна Олександрівна Герасимова-Персидська; 23 December 1927 - 8 December 2020) was a Ukrainian musicologist, Doctor of Art Studies (1978), and Honored Artist of Ukraine (1997). She was the author of more than 140 works, including monographs on the history and theory of part song in Ukraine and Russia.

== Early life and education ==
In 1951, Herasymova-Persydska graduated from the historical-theoretical faculty, in 1952 - from the piano faculty (Arnold Yankelevich 's class), and in 1954 - from the graduate school of the Kyiv Conservatory. In 1955, she defended her Ph.D. thesis on the topic Folksong Foundations of Ukrainian Soviet Symphonism.

== Career ==
Since 1951, Herasymova-Persydska has taught at the Kyiv Conservatory. In 1979, she became a professor. In 1978, Herasymova-Persydska defended her doctoral dissertation on the topic Part song concert in Ukraine in the second half of the 17th - the first half of the 18th century and its place in the culture of the era.

In 2000, on the initiative of Herasymova-Persydska, the Department of Classical Music was organized at the National Academy of Sciences. She gave lectures at European universities (1985, 1986, 1990, 1992) and in the USA (Fulbright Visiting Scholar, 1990).

From 1995 to 2002, Herasymova-Persydska was the general secretary of the Ukrainian National Committee of the International Music Council (IMC) at UNESCO. She was a Liaison Coordinator for the International Council for Traditional Music (ICTM).

=== Scientific and pedagogical activity ===
The main topics addressed by Herasymova-Persydska are music of the Baroque era, history and theory of the part song form, music and time, and the manifestation of non-classical principles in European music from Ars nova to the present day. She also researched the issues of space and time in music.

Herasymova-Persydska had a scientific interest in the phenomenon of musical work; semiotics; formation of general ideas about our time in their connections with other - both humanitarian and natural sciences. The main problem around which all the topics of the scientist's work are united is the dialectical pair of discreteness and continuity, which allows for presenting the history of the development of European music as a complete system.

The main focus of her work is related to the part song form. Herasymova-Persydska described the Kyiv collection of part song works (sets of votives from the Kyiv Pechersk Lavra and St.Sophia Cathedral). She also carried out work in manuscript repositories of other countries (Russia, Lithuania, and Serbia). The part song works published by the researcher were included in the repertoire of many choral groups (in particular, the choir "Kyiv" under the direction of Mykola Hobdych, and the ensemble "A cappella Leopolis" under the direction of Roman Stelmashchuk).

=== Social activity ===
Herasymova-Persydska was one of the first to establish and implement connections between Ukrainian and foreign musicology. She took an active part in the work of international organizations, gave lectures, and presented reports at international scientific forums, and symposiums in Ukraine, Russia, Poland, Germany, Italy, Spain, France, the USA, and Switzerland.

Herasymova-Persydska was the author and organizer of the following projects: the international festival "Musical Dialogues: Ukraine and the Baroque World" (1994), the international conference "Orthodox Monody" (1998), the creative workshop of young researchers "Time - Space - Music" (2000), annual conferences under the common name "Sound and Sign" (since 2005), the international project "Schola cantorum Basiliensis visiting the National Music Academy of Ukraine" (Switzerland - Ukraine, 2000-2003) and others.

Herasymova-Persydska greatly contributed to the development of Ukrainian musicology and the improvement of the education system. She developed a concept of the first department of early music in Ukraine, which was opened in 2000 at the National Academy of Music. She created special educational programs for the study of both Western European and domestic music of the Middle Ages, the Renaissance, and the Baroque. Herasymova-Persydska is the creator of her research school of Ukrainian medieval studies.

Among the graduates of Herasymova-Persidskaya are Natalia Zabolotna, Liudmyla Ivchenko, Liubov Kiyanovska, Hennadii Lyashenko, Vadym Khrapachov, Olena Shevchuk, and others.

== Awards and honors ==
- Merited Artist of Ukraine (1997)
- Decoration of Honor Meritorious for Polish Culture of the Ministry of Culture and Arts of Poland (Polish: “Odznaka Honorowa "Zasłużony dla Kultury Polskiej") (2006)
- Mykola Lysenko Award (1991)
- Grand Gold Medal of the National Academy of Arts of Ukraine (2002)

== Membership in organizations ==
- Full member of the International Musicological Society (1990)
- Member of the National All-Ukrainian Music Union (1993)
- Academician of the National Academy of Arts of Ukraine (2006)
