= The Runaway Bunny (TV special) =

2021 animated television special

The Runaway Bunny is an animated television special by HBO Max based on the children's book of the same name, that premiered on March 25, 2021. The program is directed and produced by Amy Schatz, and narrated by Tracee Ellis Ross. It features music by Mariah Carey, Rosanne Cash, Kimya Dawson, Michael Kiwanuka, Ziggy Marley, Kelly Rowland, and Rufus Wainwright.

The special was removed from HBO Max in August 2022.

== Reception ==
Common Sense Media rated the show 4 out of 5 stars.

Sam Thielman, writing for NBC News, said, "HBO Max's 'The Runaway Bunny' is emotionally intense, beautiful and abstract. My kid loved it."
