= Pasichna rural hromada =

Rural hromada of Ivano-Frankivsk Oblast, Ukraine

Pasichna rural hromada Пасічнянська сільська громада
- Hromada
- Interactive map of Pasichna rural hromada
- Country: Ukraine
- Oblast: Ivano-Frankivsk
- Raion: Nadvirna

Area
  - Total: 420.0 km^{2} (162.2 sq mi)

Population (2023)
  - Total: 21,013
  - Density: 50.03/km^{2} (129.6/sq mi)
- Settlements: 11
- Villages: 10
- Towns: 1
- Website: pasichna-tg.gov.ua

Pasichna rural territorial hromada (Ukrainian: Пасічнянська сільська територіальна громада, romanized: Pasichnianska silska terytorialna hromada) is one of the hromadas of Ukraine, located in Ivano-Frankivsk Oblast's Nadvirna Raion. Its capital is the village of Pasichna.

The hromada has a total area of 420.0 km^{2} (162.2 mi^{2}), as well as a population of 21,013 (as of 2023).

== Composition ==
In addition to one urban-type settlement (Bytkiv), the hromada contains 10 villages:

- Bilozoryna
- Bukove
- Chernyk
- Maksymets
- Mozolivka
- Pasichna
- Pniv
- Postoiata
- Sokolovytsia
- Zelena
