= Bohdan Beniuk =

Ukrainian film and theatre actor and politician

- Богдан Бенюк
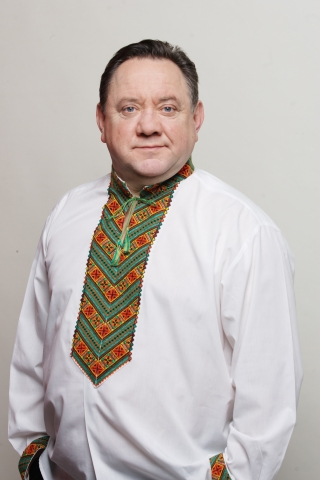
- Beniuk in 2015

People's Deputy of Ukraine
- In office 12 December 2012 – 27 November 2014
- Constituency: Svoboda, No. 2

Personal details
- Born: 26 May 1957 (age 69) Bytkiv, Ukrainian SSR, Soviet Union
- Party: Svoboda
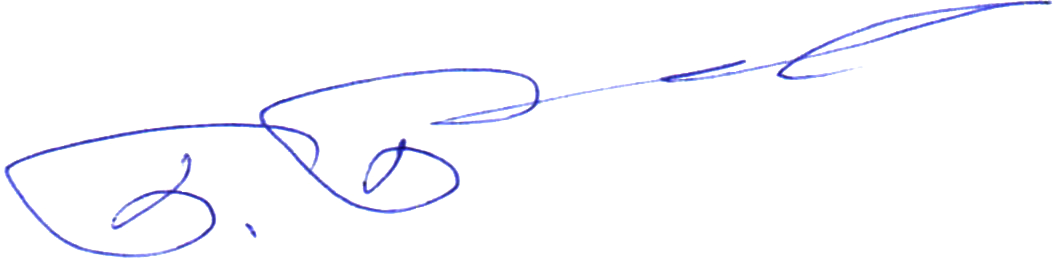
- Signature

Bohdan Mykhailovych Beniuk (Ukrainian: Богдан Михайлович Бенюк; born 26 May 1957) is a Ukrainian film and theatre actor and politician who served as a People's Deputy of Ukraine from 2012 to 2014. People's Artist of Ukraine (1996). Along with Anatoliy Khostikoiev, he is a creator of the Theatrical company Beniuk and Khostikoiev.

== Biography ==
Beniuk was born on 26 May 1957, in town of Bytkiv, Nadvirna Raion, Ukrainian SSR. He has two brothers: People's Artist of Ukraine Petro Beniuk and Vasyl Beniuk. Bohdan Beniuk graduated the National University of Theatre, Film and TV in Kyiv in 1978.

In 1978–80 he worked in the Kyiv theater of young viewer. After that, Beniuk was an actor of the Ivan Franko National Academic Drama Theater in Kyiv.

Since February 2018, Professor Bohdan Beniuk has been the head of the Department of Acting and Drama Directing at the Karpenko-Kary National University of Kyiv. On November 8, 2022, he was temporarily appointed artistic director of the Kyiv Academic Drama Theater in Podil for the period of martial law.

== Selected filmography ==
- The Lady with the parrot (Дама с попугаем, 1988) as Director of the pioneer camp
- The Captain Brovary (2022). Ukrainian, short film, in the genre of mockumentary.

== Politics ==
During the 2012 Ukrainian parliamentary election Beniuk was placed second on the proportional list of Svoboda. On 18 March 2014, Beniuk, along with his teammates on the "Svoboda" party, including the deputy of the Verkhovna Rada Ihor Miroshnychenko, by the use of physical force pushed the head of the National Television Company of Ukraine Oleksander Panteleimon to resign. Beniuk's outrage was triggered by displays of Russians celebrating the annexation of Crimea by the Russian Federation on television. The actions of Svoboda were condemned by Prime Minister Arseniy Yatsenyuk.

In the 2019 Ukrainian parliamentary election Beniuk was placed sixth on the joint proportional list of Svoboda with the National Corps, the Governmental Initiative of Yarosh and Right Sector.

== Recognition ==
- Merited Artist of Ukrainian SSR (1988)
- People's Artist of Ukraine (1996)
- Laureate of the Dovzhenko State Prize (1998)
- Laureate of the Shevchenko National Prize (2008)
- Knight of the Order "For Merit":
  - "For Merit, 1st Class" (2017)
  - "For Merit, 2nd Class" (2010)
  - "For Merit, 3rd Class" (2007)
