= Pasichna, Ivano-Frankivsk Oblast =

Village in Ivano-Frankivsk Oblast, Ukraine

Pasichna Пасічна
- Village
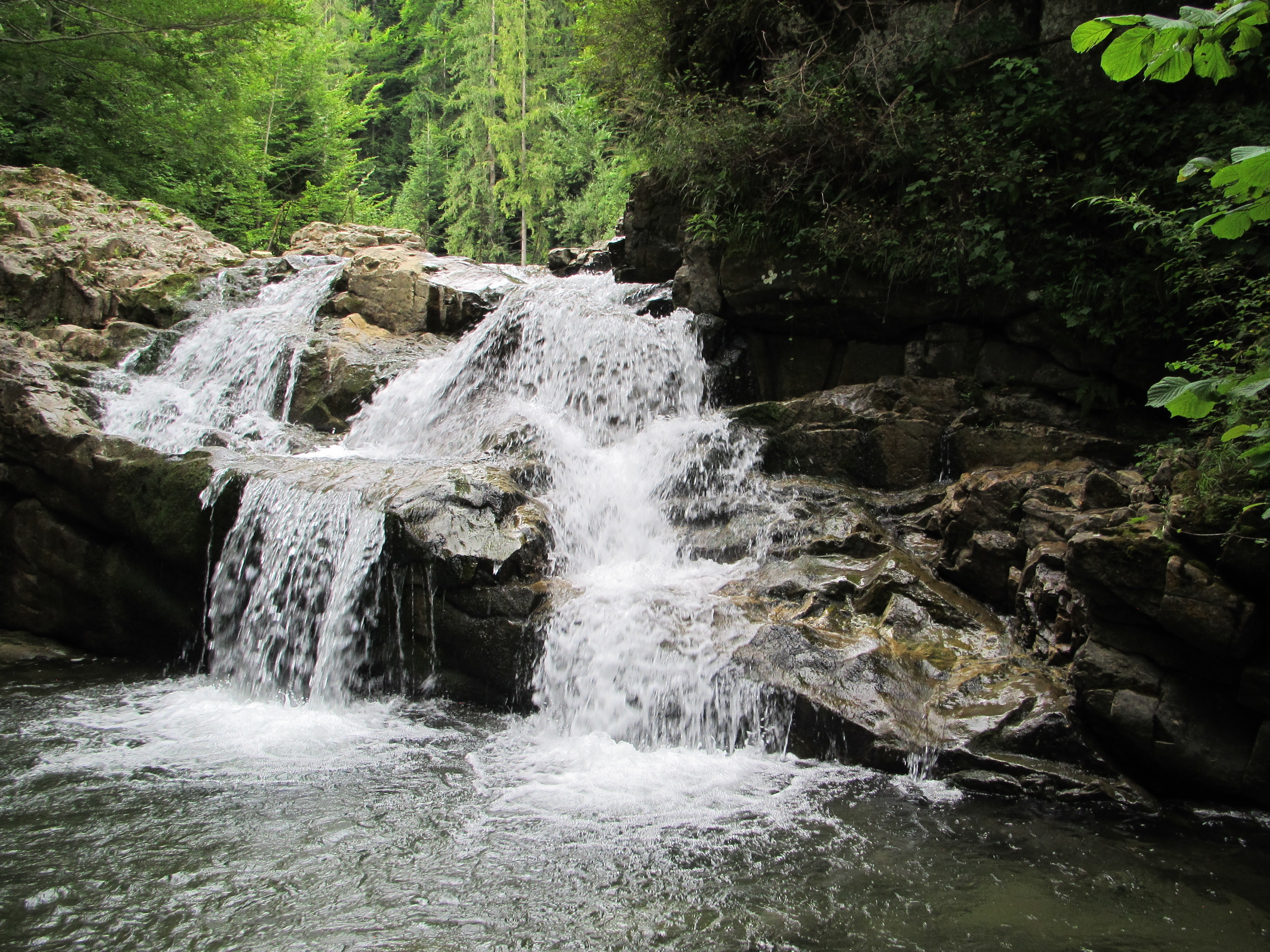
- Roztoka waterfall, outside Pasichna

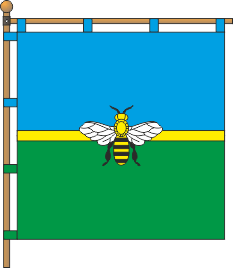
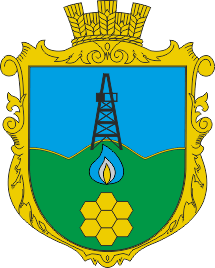
- Flag Coat of arms

- Location of Pasichna in Ivano-Frankivsk Oblast Location of Pasichna in Ukraine
- Coordinates: 48°34′07″N 24°25′07″E
- Country: Ukraine
- Oblast: Ivano-Frankivsk Oblast
- Raion: Nadvirna Raion
- Established: 1560

Population
  - Total: 4,717

Pasichna (Ukrainian: Пасічна; Polish: Pasieczna) is a village in Ivano-Frankivsk Oblast, Ukraine, in Nadvirna Raion. It is the capital of Pasichna rural hromada.

== History ==
Pasichna's founding date is a matter of some debate; Ukrainian sources typically place the village's founding as 1560, while Polish sources claim it was founded in the later half of the 15th century. Petroleum production began in the village in 1860, and the local Catholic population began to increase. In 1912, a wooden Catholic church was constructed in the village. The village is part of Hutsulshchyna.

During World War II, Ukrainian Soviet partisans under the command of Sydir Kovpak briefly resided in the village.

== Notable residents ==
- Mykhailo Tsymbaliuk, Ukrainian police officer, professor, and politician
