= Roman Dytko =

Ukrainian footballer

Personal information
- Full name: Roman Andriyovych Dytko
- Date of birth: 21 August 1996 (age 30)
- Place of birth: Bytkiv, Ukraine
- Height: 1.82 m (6 ft 0 in)
- Position: Attacking midfielder

Team information
- Current team: Harda Kalush

Youth career
- 2009–2010: Prykarpattia Ivano-Frankivsk
- 2010–2013: UFK-Karpaty Lviv
- 2013–2014: Bytkiv

Senior career*
Years	Team	Apps	(Gls)
2015–2016	Bytkiv	28	(25)
2016–2017	Ivano-Frankivsk	12	(7)
2017–2023	Prykarpattia Ivano-Frankivsk	111	(21)
2023–	Skala Stryi	0	(0)
2023–2025	Probiy Horodenka	5	(1)
2025–	Harda Kalush	0	(0)
- * Club domestic league appearances and goals as of 7 October 2025

Roman Andriyovych Dytko (Ukrainian: Роман Андрійович Дитко; born 21 August 1996) is a Ukrainian professional footballer who plays as an attacking midfielder for Ukrainian club Prykarpattia Ivano-Frankivsk.

== Honours ==
Probiy Horodenka

- Ukrainian Second League: 2024–25
