= Aleksander Zarzycki =

Polish musician (d. 1895)

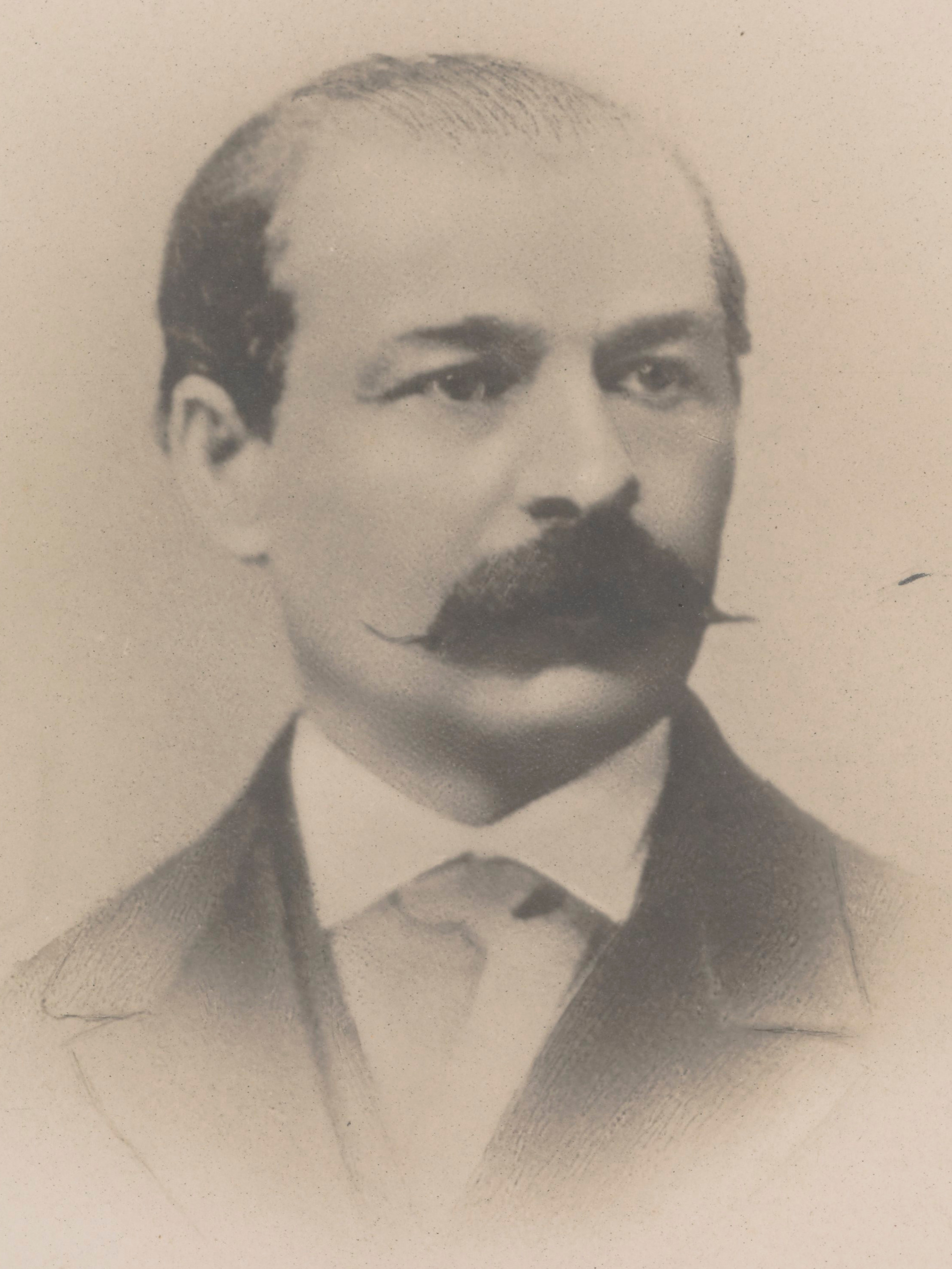

Background information
- Born: 26 February 1834; Lwów (Lemberg), Austria-Hungary
- Origin: Poland
- Died: 1 November 1895 (aged 61)
- Occupations: Pianist, Composer] and conductor

Aleksander Zarzycki (26 February 1834 in Lwów (Lemberg), Austria-Hungary (now Lviv, Ukraine) – 1 November 1895 in Warsaw) was a Polish pianist, composer and conductor. He was an author of piano and violin compositions, mazurkas, polonaises, krakowiaks, and songs.

In 1871 he co-founded and became the first director of the Warsaw Music Society (Warszawskie Towarzystwo Muzyczne). In the years 1879–1888 director of the Warsaw Music Institute (Insytut Muzyczny w Warszawie).

His Grande Polonaise and Piano Concerto have been recorded by Jonathan Plowright.

== Selected works ==
Orchestral

- Suite polonaise (Suita polska), Op. 37

1. À la polonaise (Tempo di polacca)
2. À la mazourka
3. Intermezzo cantabile
4. À la cracovienne

Concertante

- Grande polonaise for piano and orchestra, Op. 7
- Concerto (Koncert fortepianowy) for piano and orchestra, Op. 17
- Andante et polonaise (Andante i polonez A-dur) in A major for violin and orchestra (or piano), Op. 23
- Introduction et cracovienne (Introduction and Krakowiak; Introdukcja i Krakowiak D-dur) in D major for violin and orchestra, Op. 35

Chamber music

- Romance (Romans) for violin and piano or small ensemble accompaniment (flute, clarinet, 2 horns and strings), Op. 16 (published 1876)
- Mazurka in G major for violin and piano or orchestra, Op. 26 (published 1884)
- Mazurka No. 2 (II. Mazurek E-dur) in E major for violin and piano, Op. 39

Piano

- Valse brillante (1866)
- Grande valse, Op. 4 (published 1862)
- 2 Chants sans paroles, Op. 6

1. Berceuse
2. Idylle

- 2 Nocturnes (G♭ major, A major), Op. 10 (published 1868)
- 2 Mazurkas, Op. 12 (published in 1869)
- Chant d'amour et Barcarolle, 2 Morceaux, Op. 19
- Sérénade et Valse-Impromptu, 2 Morceaux, Op. 24
- Mazurka in E, Op.38 (published 1894)

Vocal

- "Między nami nic nie było"
- 3 Lieder, Op. 11 (published 1868)
- 3 Songs for soprano and piano, Op. 22
