= Glen Roven =

- Born: Glen Paul Roven; July 13, 1957
- Died: July 25, 2018 (aged 61)
- Occupation(s): Composer, lyricist, conductor, producer

Glen Paul Roven (July 13, 1957 – July 25, 2018) was an American two-time Emmy winning composer, lyricist, conductor and producer. He composed the music to "The Hillary Speeches" setting two of Mrs. Clinton's speeches to music which streamed opposite Trump's inauguration and featured opera stars Patricia Racette, Isabel Leonard, Nathan Gunn, Lawrence Brownlee, Mathew Polenzani, Kyle Ketelson, and twenty-three others. Other notable Roven compositions include a violin concerto based on the children's book The Runaway Bunny which was recorded by Sony narrated by Brooke Shields and recorded by GPRrecords narrated by Catherine Zeta-Jones. Another notable composition is "Goodnight Moon, An Aria for Singer and Orchestra" which the National Chorale performed at Geffen Hall in 2016. It was subsequently performed at Carnegie Hall, Alice Tully Hall, and the Kimmel Center. His Symphony No. 2 premiered at Geffen Hall (2018) and he produced with Universal Music Hopes and Dreams, The Carnegie Hall Lullaby Project with Catherine Zeta-Jones, Joyce DiDonato, Patti LuPone, Dianne Reeves, Fiona Apple, Natalie Merchant, Pretty Yende and more. The CD hit number one in both the Classical and Pop charts. He was creating the Poetry Curriculum for K-6 for the United States Public School System. He was working on a musical for Netflix written by and starring Dolly Parton. He was the Artist Director of Roven Records. On July 25, 2018, Roven died at the age of 61.

== Biography ==
Sources differ on Roven's year of birth. His family's own published death notice states that he was born July 13, 1957, while the New York Times' obituary of Roven gives a birth date of July 13, 1958. Commercially available databases also state that he was born on July 13, 1957.

=== Stage career ===
While in high school, Roven worked as a rehearsal pianist for Pippin. After graduation, he attended Columbia University and worked on the New York productions of Very Good Eddie, The Madwoman of CPW, Really Rosie, A Party with Betty Comden and Adolph Green, She Loves Me, and Woman of the Year.

At 19, Roven was the original musical director of Sugar Babies on Broadway starring Ann Miller and Mickey Rooney.

He arranged Patti LuPone’s one-woman Broadway show and was the co-musical supervisor for Liza Minnelli's, Stepping Out, at Radio City Music Hall. He was a contributing composer for the Off-Broadway hit, A... My Name Is Alice, and wrote the scores for John Guare's Lydie Breeze, directed by Louis Malle, and Gardenia, directed by Karel Reisz. He also composed the scores for Larry Gelbart's Mastergate, and Christopher Isherwood's A Meeting by the River, on Broadway, and Got to Get Away.

His musical, Heart's Desire, premiered at the Cleveland Play House. It was performed subsequently for one night at the Shaftesbury Theatre in London's West end directed by Simon Callow.

On May 28, 2008, Norman's Ark opened the Los Angeles New Musical Festival and was directed by Peter Schneider and produced by Maria S. Schlatter.

English Baritone Mark Stone, Daniel Okulitch, and Isabel Leonard recently performed evenings of Roven's Concert music at Carnegie Hall with Roven at the piano.

=== Conducting ===
He conducted President Bill Clinton's two inaugural concerts as well as President George W. Bush's two inaugural concerts. He also conducted and arranged Frank Sinatra and Sammy Davis Jr.'s last TV appearances. He also conducted the TV Specials, Night of 100 Stars, Night of 100 Stars II, and Night of 100 Stars III.

He made his Israeli conducting debut in 2001 conducting the Israel Philharmonic Orchestra. He has conducted the National Symphony, the Seattle Symphony, the Hollywood Bowl Orchestra, the IKO, the Munich Philharmonic, and the Radio Luxembourg Orchestra.

Roven also arranged and conducted for Julie Andrews, Jason Alexander, Anita Baker, Kathleen Battle, Michael Bolton, Bono, Brooks and Dunn, Ray Charles, Charlotte Church, Natalie Cole, Plácido Domingo, Ella Fitzgerald, Renée Fleming, Aretha Franklin, Kenny G., Denyce Graves, Goldie Hawn, Scott Hamilton, Gregory Hines, Bob Hope, Whitney Houston, Michael Jackson, Catherine Zeta-Jones, Jane Krakowski, Kermit the Frog, Patti LaBelle, Brian McKnight, Liza Minnelli, Patti LuPone, Bernadette Peters, Chita Rivera, Diana Ross, Lily Tomlin, Shirley MacLaine, Luther Vandross, Nancy Wilson, Stevie Wonder and Trisha Yearwood.

=== Other ventures ===
As a CD producer, Roven produced (for GPRrecords) : Jason Alexander, Christine Baranski, Thomas Bagwell, Jamie Barton, Charles Busch, Ann Hampton Callaway, Charles Castronovo, Tom Cipullo, Alan Cumming, Tyne Daly, Joyce DiDonato, Michael Douglas, Nathan Gunn, Lauren Flanigan, Leon Fleisher, Andrew Garland, David Garrison, Joanna Gleason, Ricky Ian Gordon, Joel Grey, Daron Hagen, Dick Hyman, Jake Heggie, Florence Henderson, Rob Kapilow, Barry Humphries, Isabel Leonard, Lowell Liebermann, Wynton Marsalis, Jorge Martín, Susanne Mentzer, Patti LuPone, Gilda Lyons, Kate Mulgrew, Cynthia Nixon, Daniel Okulitch, Chris Parker, Patricia Racette, Chris Sarandon, Paul Shaffer, William Schimmel, Noah Stewart, Paulo Szot, Talise Trevigne, Kathleen Turner, Catherine Zeta-Jones and many others.

As a translator, Roven has translated all three DaPonte/Mozart Operas: Figaro, Cosi and Don Giovanni. He translated Mahler's Ruckert Lieder, Songs of a Wayfarer, Kindertotenlieder and Des Knaben Wunderhorn. He has also translated Schubert's Wintereisse and all of Hugo Wolf's Italian Songbook.

For children, Roven produced the Sharon, Lois & Bram album, Candles, Snow and Mistletoe (1993), which was also at the Palace Theatre, New York City. He also wrote the theme for the 1990 television series, The Baby-Sitters Club.

Roven served as a contributing author to the books Games We Play, published by Simon & Schuster, and City Secrets. He has written articles for The New York Times, The LA Review of Books, Broadwayworld.com and many more.

Roven and Marc Shaiman appeared together as the two News Theme Writers in James L. Brooks's Broadcast News.

=== Death ===
On Wednesday, July 25, 2018, Roven died at the age of 61.
