= Bytkiv =

Rural locality in Ivano-Frankivsk Oblast, Ukraine

Bytkiv Битків Bitków
- Rural settlement
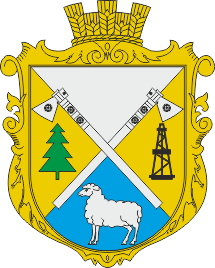
- Coat of arms

- Location within Ivano-Frankivsk Oblast Location within Ukraine
- Coordinates: 48°37′28″N 24°29′9″E
- Country: Ukraine
- Oblast: Ivano-Frankivsk Oblast
- Raion: Nadvirna Raion
- Established: 1390

Government
  - Head of Village Council: Vasyl Yosypovych Vintonyak

Area
  - Total: 31.71 km^{2} (12.24 sq mi)

Population (2022)
  - Total: 4,310
  - Density: 136/km^{2} (352/sq mi)
- Postal code: 78430
- Area code: (+380) 3475

Bytkiv (Ukrainian: Битків; Polish: Bitków) is a rural settlement in Nadvirna Raion, Ivano-Frankivsk Oblast, Ukraine. It belongs to Pasichna rural hromada, one of the hromadas of Ukraine. The population was 4,310 (2022 estimate).

== Location ==
Bytkiv is located 12 kilometers west of Nadvirna between Bystrytsia Nadvirnianska and Bystrytsia Solotvynska Rivers in the northeastern part of the Gorgany mountain range.

== History ==
Between 1772 and 1918 it was part of Austrian Galicia. After the end of World War I Bytkiv became part of Nadvirna Powiat in Stanisławów Voivodeship, part of Poland. In 1939 it was annexed by the Soviet Union. In 1940 it became an urban-type settlement.

Bitkiv was occupied by German troops during World War II from 1941 to 1944, part of the District of Galicia.

Since 2015, the head of the village council has been Vasyl Yosypovych Vintonyak.

Until 26 January 2024, Bytkiv was designated urban-type settlement. On this day, a new law entered into force which abolished this status, and Bytkiv became a rural settlement.

== Economy ==
Oil and gas deposits are located in the area of Bytkiv. Since the end of the 19th century, oil has been produced in the settlement, with production peaking in 1925. During the 1920s and the 1930s, Bytkiv was the largest Galician oil producer after Boryslav.

== Education ==
Bytkiv has one school serving all education levels and two 1st level schools.

== Gallery ==
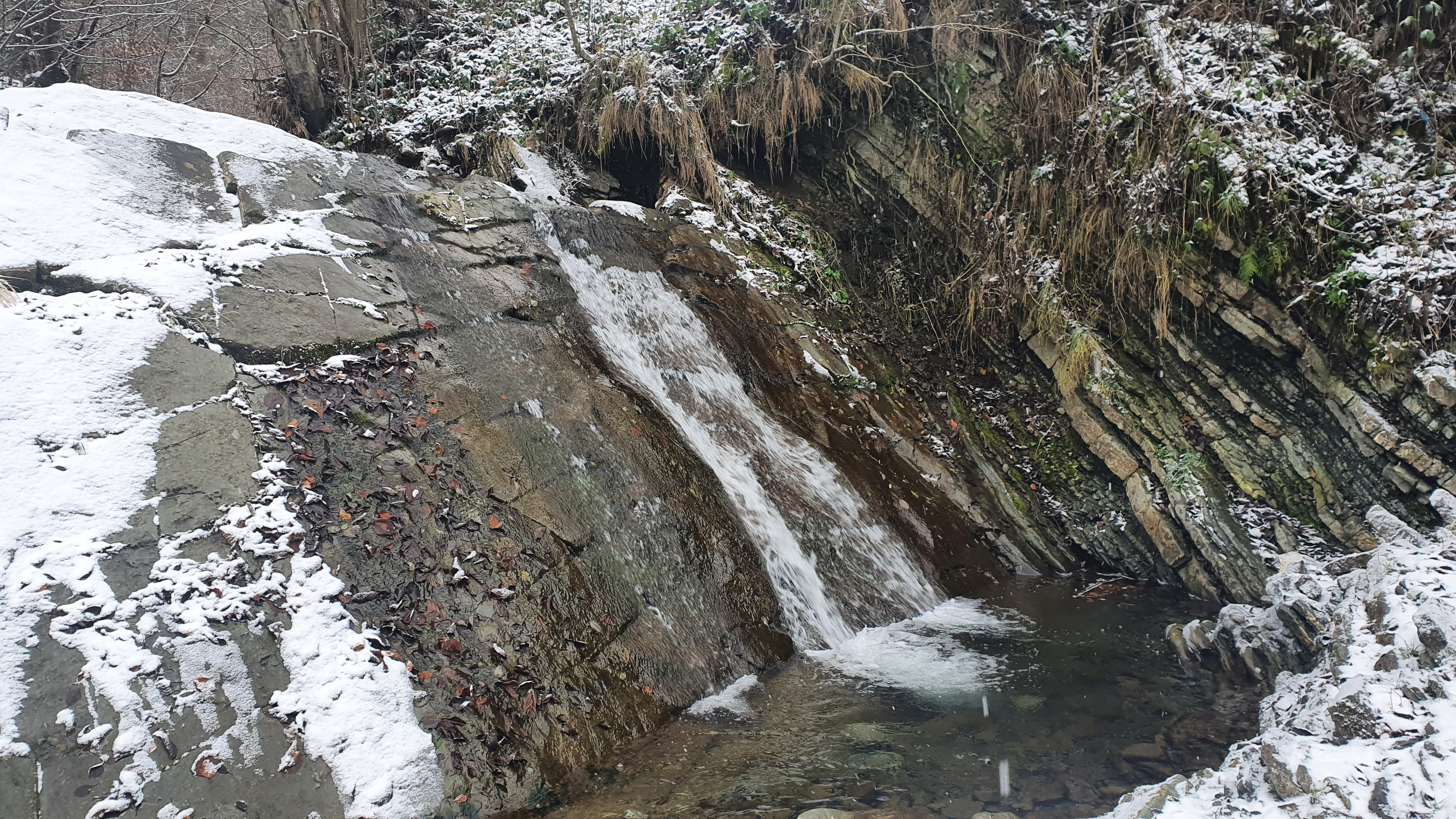
Bytkivchyk waterfall in Bytkiv

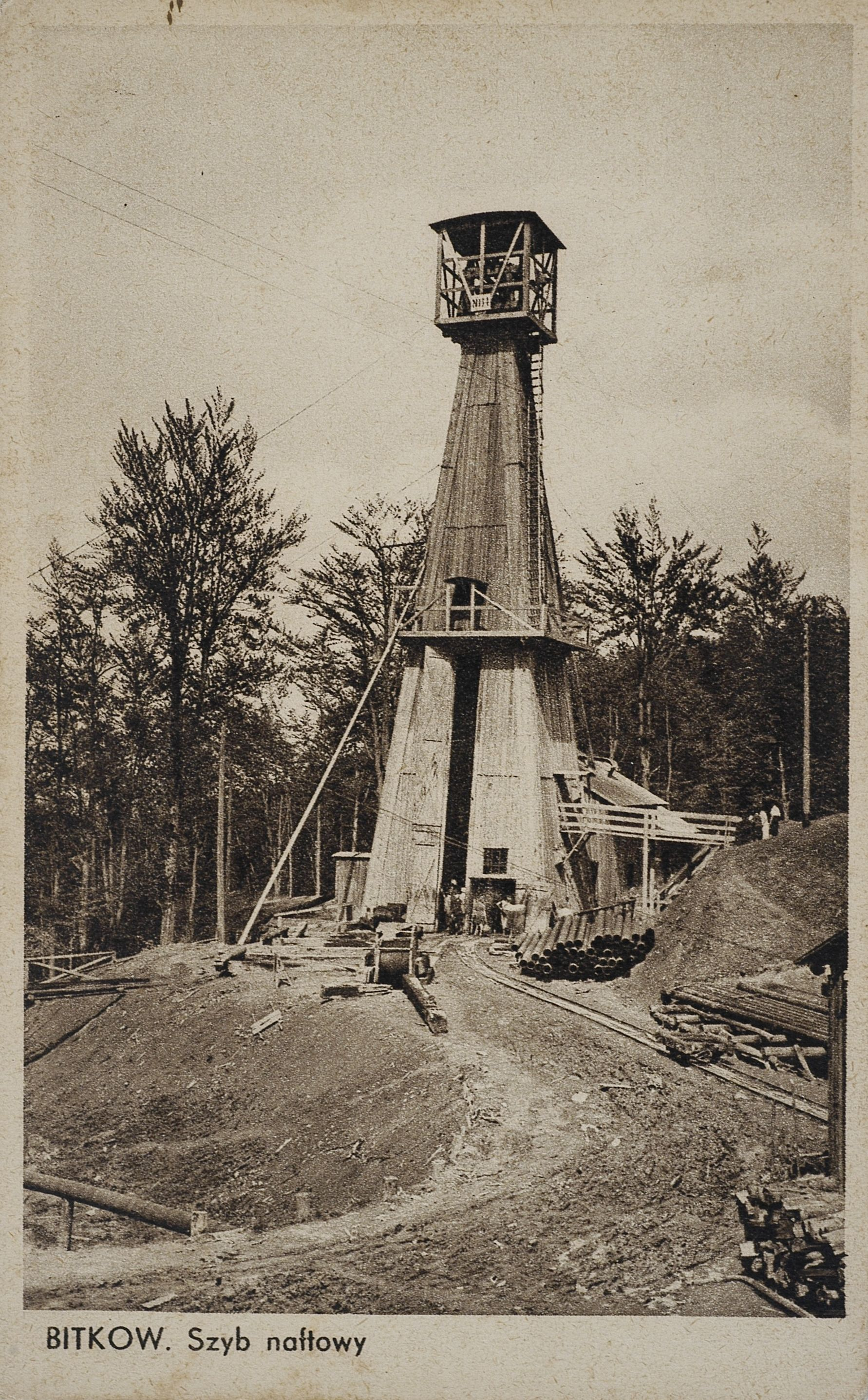
An oil well in Bytkiv, circa 1930

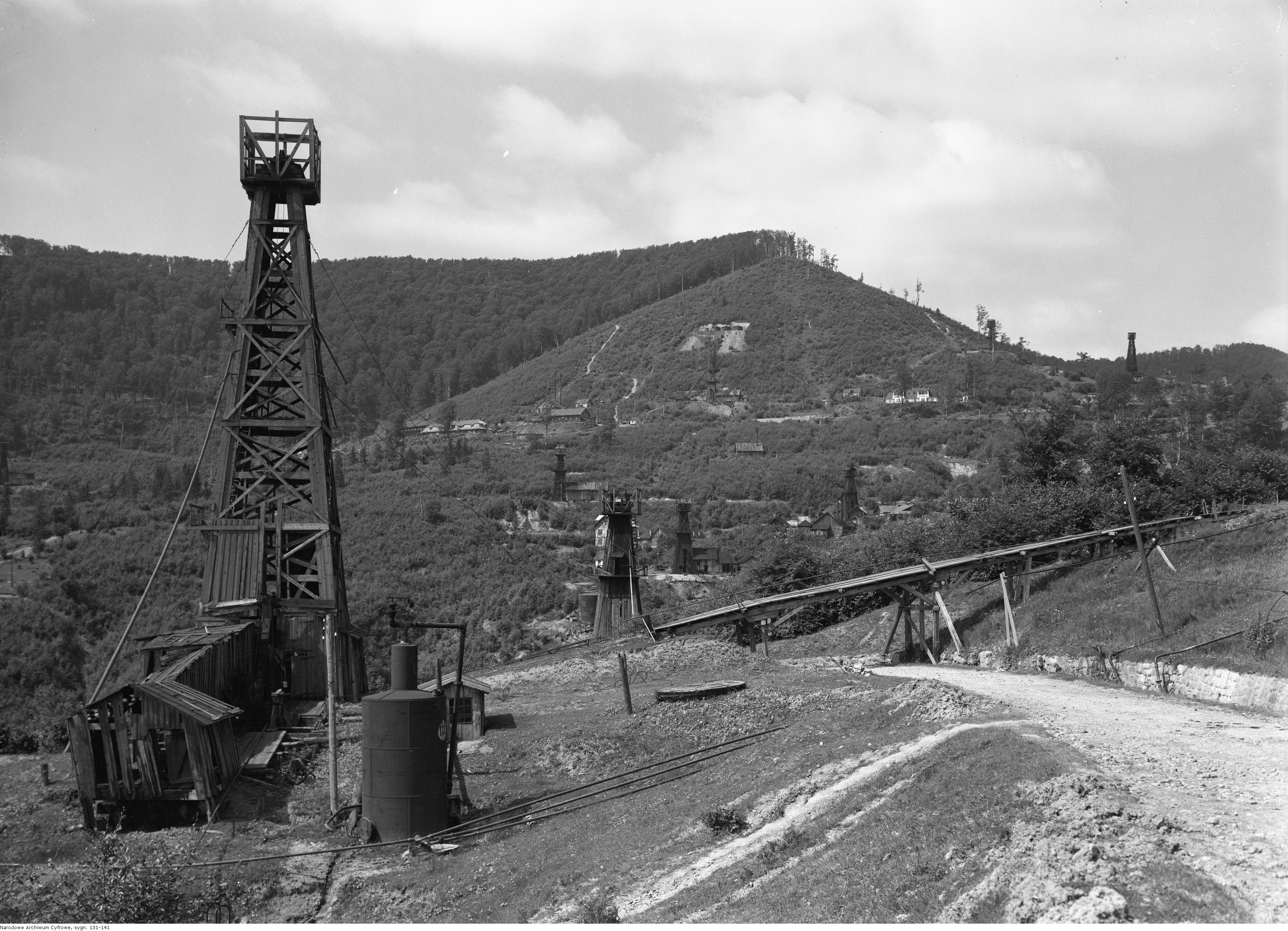
View of Bytkiv oil field in 1933

== Notable people ==
- Bohdan Beniuk, actor
- Roman Dytko, footballer
- Mykola Hobdych, choral conductor
- Roman Maksymyuk, footballer
