= The Runaway Bunny (Roven) =

Concerto by Glen Roven

The Runaway Bunny is a concerto for violin, reader and orchestra by the contemporary American composer Glen Roven, with text from the classic children's bedtime story The Runaway Bunny by Margaret Wise Brown. The concerto premiered at Carnegie Hall on April 29, 2008 with Roven conducting the American Symphony Orchestra with Glenn Close narrating.

== Composition history ==
Composer Glen Roven first conceived of writing a piece based on The Runaway Bunny after having seen the 2001 film Wit based on the play of the same name by Margaret Edson. In the film, The Runaway Bunny is read to Emma Thompson by Eileen Atkins. Roven's first sketches were for a concerto for violin, singer and orchestra, however upon advice of the Israeli-American violinist Ittai Shapira, (for whom the solo violin part was originally written), it was decided to replace the singer with narration integrated into the overall musical structure. The work is in a single movement, with numerous tempo changes depicting the bunny's adventures.

According to the composer, The Runaway Bunny is similar to other classical concert works based on children's stories such as Prokofiev's Peter and the Wolf, Kleinsinger's "Tubby the Tuba", Chappell's "Paddington Bear's First Concert" or Poulenc's "L'histoire de Babar." The composer has subsequently arranged the orchestral score for piano trio and piano solo. All editions are published by Bill Holab Music.

This is the first concert piece to be based upon one of Margaret Wise Brown's popular children's tales.

=== The text ===
The text for Glen Roven's composition is drawn from The Runaway Bunny, a 1942 picture book written by Margaret Wise Brown and illustrated by Clement Hurd. The plot deals with a little bunny who wants to run away, becoming variously a fish, a rock on the mountain, a crocus in a hidden garden, a bird, a sailboat, a circus acrobat, a finally a little boy until he resigns himself to just stay where he is and remain his mother's little bunny. Mother Bunny appears as a fisherman, a mountain climber, a gardener, a tree, a cloud, a trapeze walker, and finally the mother herself. Brown claimed that her inspiration for The Runaway Bunny came from "Chanson de Magali", a love song based on French Provençal folklore. The call-and-response (music) structure of Brown's text provides an emotionally compelling depiction of a small child's first burst of independence and a mother's affirmation of unconditional love.

== Featured performances ==
The broad popularity of Glen Roven's setting of Margaret Wise Brown's text has attracted many international celebrities including:

- Shawn King, introduced by Larry King (performed during the Jerry Lewis MDA Labor Day Telethon, August 31, 2006)
- Carnegie Hall World Premiere. Brooke Shields was announced, but was not able to perform the World Premiere.
- Glenn Close
- Kate Mulgrew
- Catherine Zeta-Jones

== Recordings ==
- 2008: Narrator: Brooke Shields; conductor: Barry Wordsworth; violin solo: Ittai Shapira; Royal Philharmonic Orchestra Sony 722855
- 2012: Narrator: Catherine Zeta-Jones (Piano Trio version); Trio 21 GPR11012
