= Kyiv Chamber Choir =

Ukrainian choir

The Kyiv Chamber Choir (Ukrainian: Камерний хор "Київ") is a chamber choir based in Kyiv, Ukraine. The choir was founded in December 1990 by conductor Mykola Hobdych. It has performed thousands of concerts in at least 21 countries. The choir also records music, releasing over 40 compact disks. More than half of these compositions were recorded for the first time. The choir has performed at renowned American venues such as Carnegie Hall, the National Cathedral, and the White House. Kyiv Chamber Choir sings much of its music a cappella. Its repertoire includes well-known classical compositions, but also that of Ukrainian composers such as Mykola Lysenko, Mykola Leontovych, Kyrylo Stetsenko, Artem Vedel, and Mykola Diletsky.

The Kyiv Chamber Choir has done well in international choral competitions. These include first prizes in the 1st Schumann International Choral Competition in Zwickau in Germany, the 12th International competition of Choir Music in Poland, the 7th international Choirs Competition at Sligo in Ireland, and a second prize in Choir of the Year Competition.
