= Mykola Hobdych =

Ukrainian choral conductor (born 1961)

Mykola Mykolayovych Hobdych Микола Миколайович Гобдич Shevchenko National Prize laureate
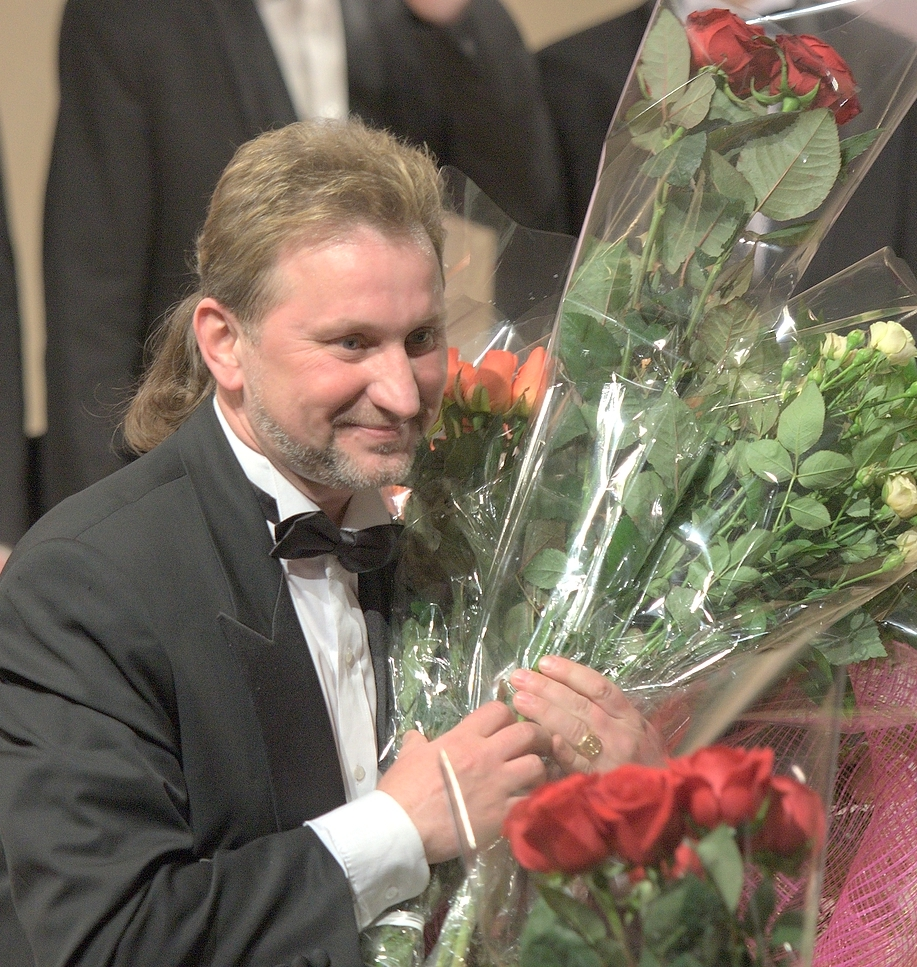
- Hobdych in 2011

Background information
- Born: March 28, 1961 (age 65); Bytkiv, Ukrainian SSR, Soviet Union
- Genres: Choral
- Occupation: Choral conductor

Mykola Mykolayovych Hobdych (Note: Ukrainian: Микола Миколайович Гобдич, romanized: Mykola Mykolaiovych Hobdych (or Gobdych)) (born March 28, 1961) is a Ukrainian choral conductor, known for being the founder and director of the Kyiv Chamber Choir. He was born in Bytkiv, and he founded the Kyiv Chamber Choir in 1990 with alumni of the Kiev State Conservatory.
