= Burkut (village) =

Rural locality in Ivano-Frankivsk Oblast, Ukraine

Burkut Буркут
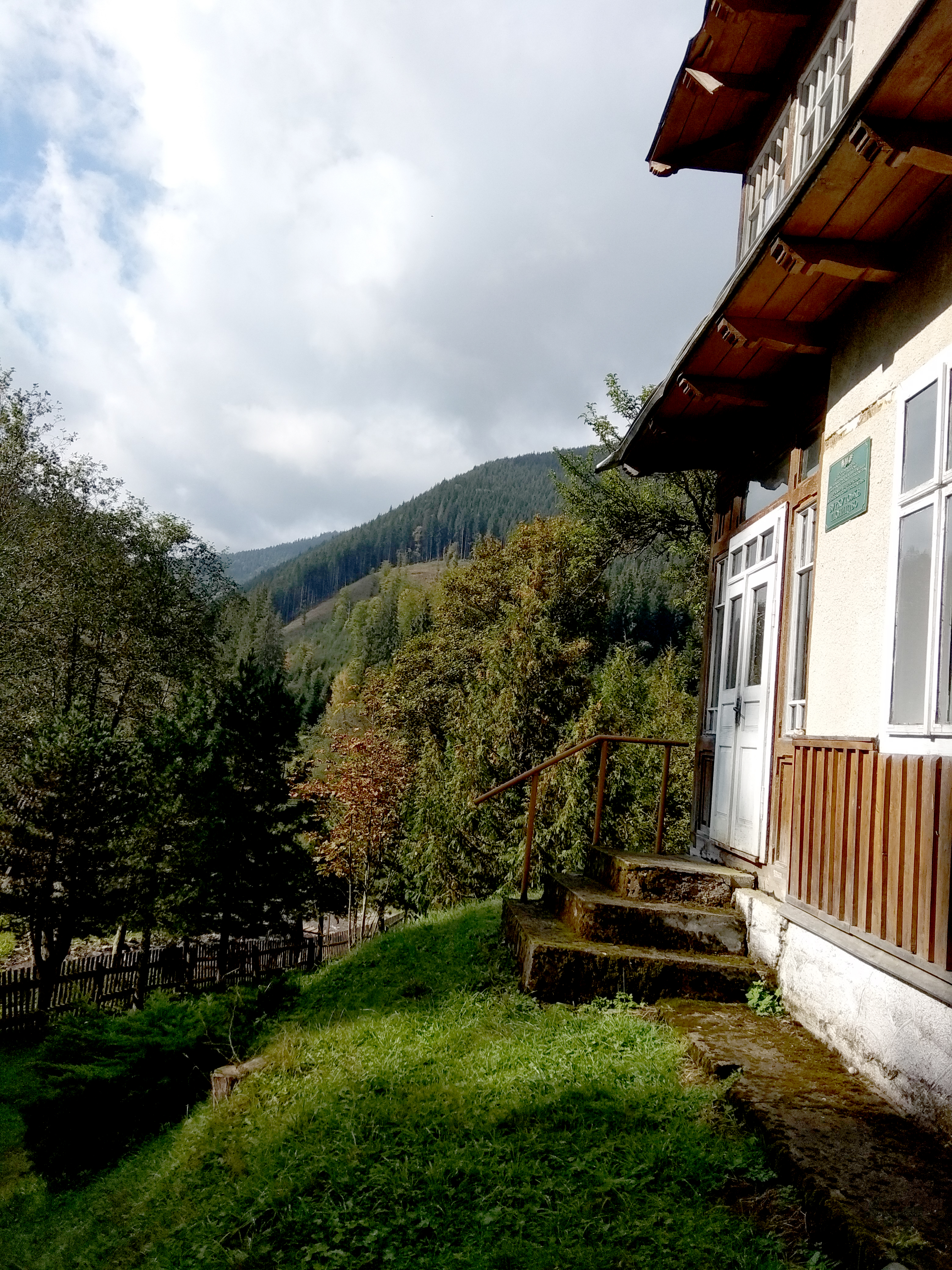
- View from the house of Lesya Ukrainka in Burkut

- Location in Ivano-Frankivsk Oblast
- Coordinates: 47°56′34″N 24°41′42″E
- Country: Ukraine
- Oblast: Ivano-Frankivsk Oblast
- Raion: Verkhovyna Raion
- Hromada: Zelene rural hromada

Population
  - Total: 0
- Time zone: UTC+2 (EET)
  - Summer (DST): UTC+3 (EEST)
- Postal code: 78730

Burkut (Ukrainian: Буркут) is a village in the Zelene rural hromada of the Verkhovyna Raion of Ivano-Frankivsk Oblast in Ukraine. It is located on the river Chornyi Cheremosh in the Hutsul Beskyds, not far from Verkhovyna.

== History ==
The village has been known from the 17th century. Starting from the 18th century it became a popular mineral spa. During the First World War the resort was destroyed and hasn't been restored since then.

Since 2008, no regular inhabitants have been registered in Burkut. In modern times, several houses in the village are being leased for visitors.

On 19 July 2020, as a result of the administrative-territorial reform and liquidation of the Verkhovyna Raion, the village became part of the Verkhovyna Raion.

== Notable residents ==
The family of Ivan Franko, Lesya Ukrainka, and Klyment Kvitka were vacationing in Burkut. Also, Mariyka Pidhiryanka, Olha Kobylianska, Mykola Mikhnovskyi, and Oleksandr Kulchytskyi visited the village.

== Sources ==
- "Burkut". Geographical Dictionary of the Kingdom of Poland (in Polish). 1. Warszawa: Kasa im. Józefa Mianowskiego. 1880. p. 475.
- "Borkut". Geographical Dictionary of the Kingdom of Poland (in Polish). 1. Warszawa: Kasa im. Józefa Mianowskiego. 1880. p. 315.
