= Dzembronia, Ivano-Frankivsk Oblast =

Rural locality in Ivano-Frankivsk Oblast, Ukraine

Dzembronia Дземброня
- Village
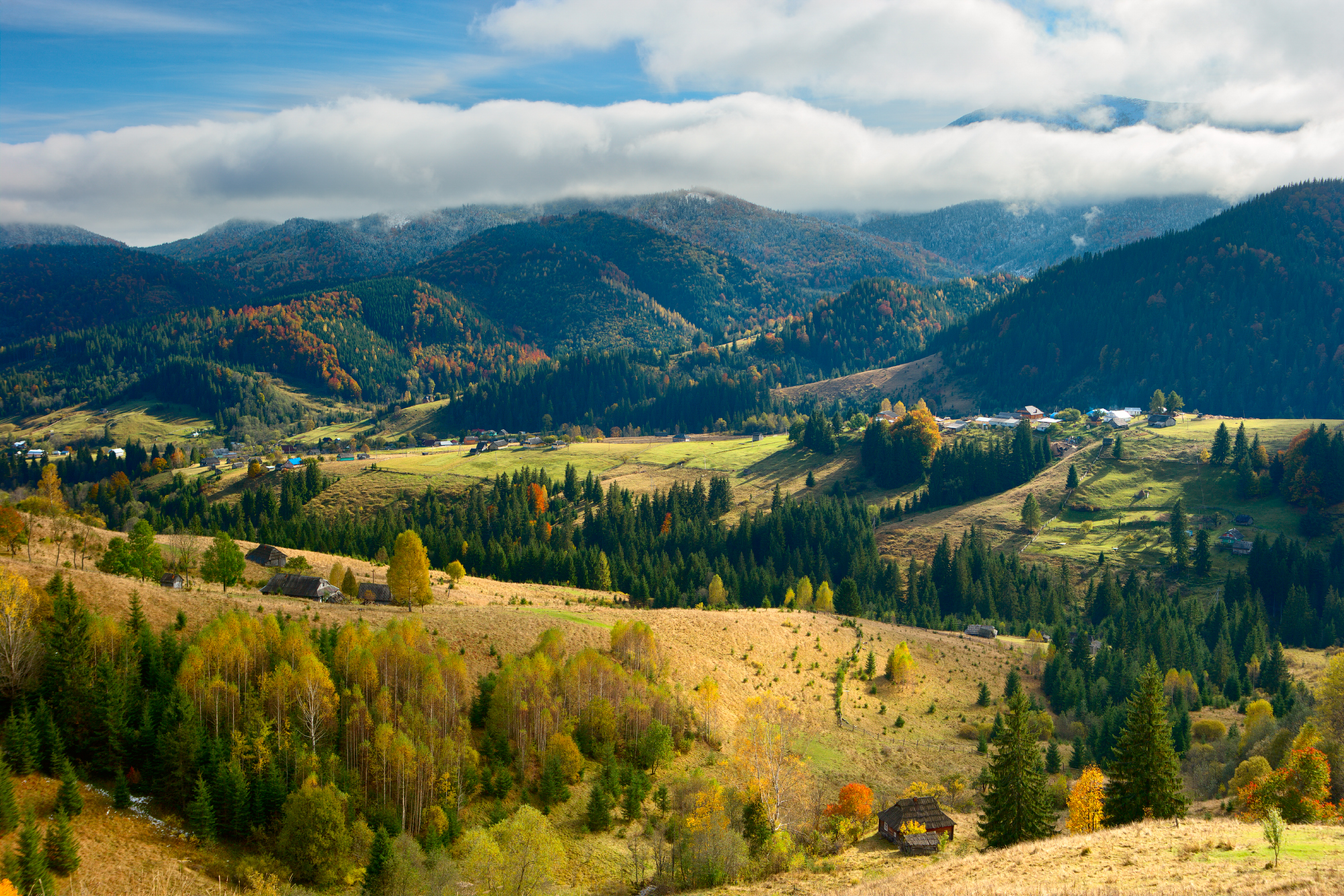

- Location within Ukraine Location within Ivano-Frankivsk Oblast
- Coordinates: 48.1068°N 24.6785°E
- Country: Ukraine
- Oblast: Ivano-Frankivsk Oblast
- Raion: Verkhovyna Raion
- Hromada: Zelene rural hromada
- Established: 1 April 1928
- Elevation: 896 m (2,940 ft)

Population (2001)
  - Total: 246
- Time zone: UTC+02:00 (EET)
  - Summer (DST): UTC+03:00 (EEST)
- Postal code: 78707
- Area code: +380 03432

Dzembronia (Ukrainian: Дземброня) is a village in the Verkhovyna Raion of the Ivano-Frankivsk Oblast of Ukraine. It is located in the southeast of the Chornohora. It forms part of Zelene rural hromada, one of the hromadas of Ukraine.

It is a famous Carpathian summer resort, visited by, among others, Lesya Ukrainka, Vasyl Stefanyk and Sergei Parajanov.

The famous Ukrainian film "Shadows of Forgotten Ancestors" ( Тіні забутих предків, 1964) was shot at the Dzembronia forest near the village.

== Geography ==
Dzembronia is located on 12 km (7.5 mi) long creek also named Dzembronia and 130 km (81 mi) south of Ivano-Frankivsk and 21 km (13 mi) southwest of Verkhovyna. It is regarded as the highest village in Ukraine.

== History ==
The Polish conquest of the Kingdom of Galicia in 1349 led to it being fully absorbed by Catholic Poland. Upon annexing it in 1349, Polish king Casimir III the Great adopted the title of King of Poland and Ruthenia, and the territory was transformed into the Ruthenian Voivodeship (Latin: Palatinatus Russiae) in 1434. During the partitions of Poland (1772_1795), it was incorporated into a crown land of the Austrian Empire – the Kingdom of Galicia and Lodomeria.

On 1 April 1928, the hamlets of Dzembronia, Bystrets, Zelene, and Yavirnyk were separated from the commune of Żabie (Verkhovyna) of Kosiv Poviat, and the self-governing village of Dzembronia was thus formed. In 1939, 1,750 residents lived in the village (1,600 Greek-Catholic Ukrainians, 110 Latin Ukrainians, 40 Poles).

After it was annexed by the Soviet Union, the village was renamed Berestetska Dzembronia, and on June 7, 1946, by decree of the Presidium of the Verkhovna Rada of the Ukrainian SSR, the village of was changed to Berestechko. After the Soviet Union dissolved in 1991, Ukraine gained independence. On 4 June 2009, by a resolution of the Verkhovna Rada, the village of Berestechko was changed back to Dzembronia.

== Demographics ==
According to the 1989 census, the population of Dzembronia was 258, of which 118 were men and 140 were women. According to the 2001 census, 242 people lived in the village.

=== Languages ===
Native language as of the Ukrainian Census of 2001:

Language	Percentage
Ukrainian	99.59 %
Moldovan (Romanian)	0.41 %

== Religion ==
In Dzembronia there is a monastery of the Transfiguration of the Lord Jesus Christ of the UGCC, as well as the Church of St. Dimitriy of Thessalonica (OCU), built in 1997. In July 2017, the OCU church was consecrated in honor of Saint Olga.
