= Biloberizka =

Village in Ivano-Frankivsk Oblast, Ukraine

Biloberizka Білоберізка Białoberezka
- Village
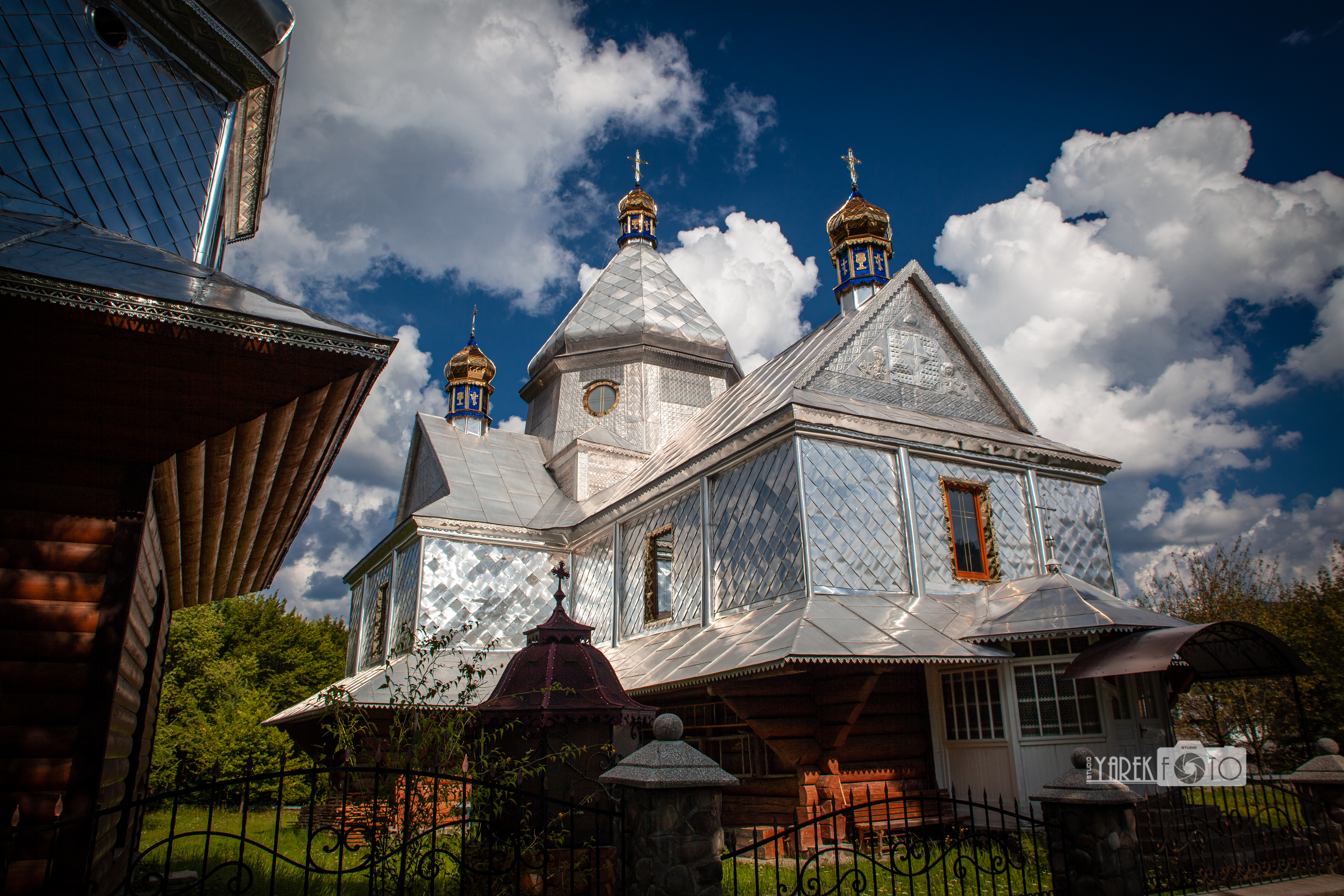
- The wooden Church of the Intercession of the Virgin Mary in Biloberizka

- Location of Biloberizka in Ivano-Frankivsk Oblast Location of Biloberizka in Ukraine
- Coordinates: 48°9′56″N 25°2′49″E
- Country: Ukraine
- Oblast: Ivano-Frankivsk Oblast
- Raion: Verkhovyna Raion

Area
  - Total: 20 km^{2} (7.7 sq mi)

Biloberizka (Ukrainian: Білоберізка; German: Biloberiska; Polish: Białoberezka) is a village in Ivano-Frankivsk Oblast, Ukraine, located in Verkhovyna Raion. It is the capital and largest settlement of the Biloberizka rural hromada.

== Information ==
Biloberizka, like many other neighbouring villages in Verkhovyna Raion, is inhabited by Hutsuls, an East Slavic ethnic group commonly regarded as a subgroup of Ukrainians. The community of the village, along with other Hutsul villages, successfully sought the inclusion of Hutsul caroling onto the National Intangible Cultural Heritage of Ukraine list in 2020.

Geographically, Biloberizka is located on the left bank of the Cheremosh river. It is located 33 km (21 mi) from Verkhovyna, and 25 km (16 mi) from Vyzhnytsia railway station.

=== Wooden Church ===
Originally built in the 17th century and later expanded from 1844 to 1851, the Church of the Intercession of the Virgin Mary is a Wooden church currently used by the Orthodox Church of Ukraine. It is an example of Hutsul Secession architecture, and was renovated during the 1980s and 1990s. It is recognised as an Architectural Monument of Cultural Heritage of Ukraine.

=== Demographics ===
According to the 2001 Ukrainian census, Biloberizka has a population of 1,231. This is a decline from the 1,411 recorded in the 1989 Soviet census. According to the 2001 Ukrainian census, 99.76% of the village population speaks Ukrainian, with the remaining population speaking Russian (0.16%) and Belarusian (0.08%).

== Notable inhabitants ==
- Volodymyr Kobrynskyi (1873–1958), Ukrainian Hutsul ethnographer
