= Bila Richka =

Rural locality in Ivano-Frankivsk Oblast, Ukraine

Bila Richka Біла Річка
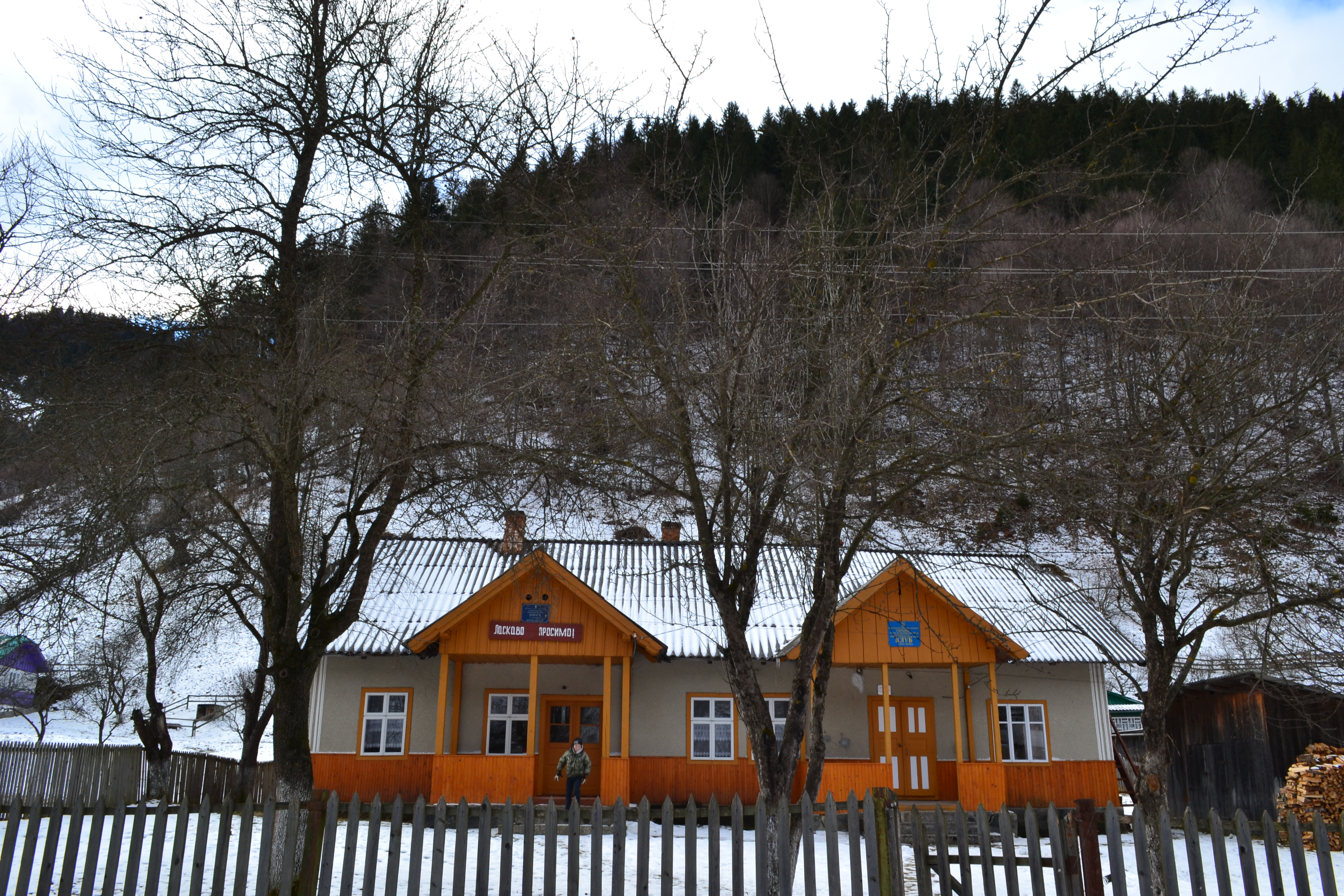
- School in Bila Richka, Ivano-Frankivsk Oblast, Ukraine
- Interactive map of Bila Richka
- Location in Ivano-Frankivsk Oblast
- Coordinates: 47°57′54″N 24°53′43″E
- Country: Ukraine
- Oblast: Ivano-Frankivsk Oblast
- Raion: Verkhovyna Raion
- Hromada: Biloberizka rural hromada

Population (2001)
  - Total: 162
- Time zone: UTC+2 (EET)
  - Summer (DST): UTC+3 (EEST)
- Postal code: 78734

Bila Richka (Ukrainian: Біла Річка) is a village in the Biloberizka rural hromada of the Verkhovyna Raion of Ivano-Frankivsk Oblast in Ukraine. After the liquidation of the Verkhovyna Raion (1940–2020) on 19 July 2020, the village became part of the Verkhovyna Raion.
