= Cheremoshna =

Rural locality in Ivano-Frankivsk Oblast, Ukraine

Cheremoshna Черемошна
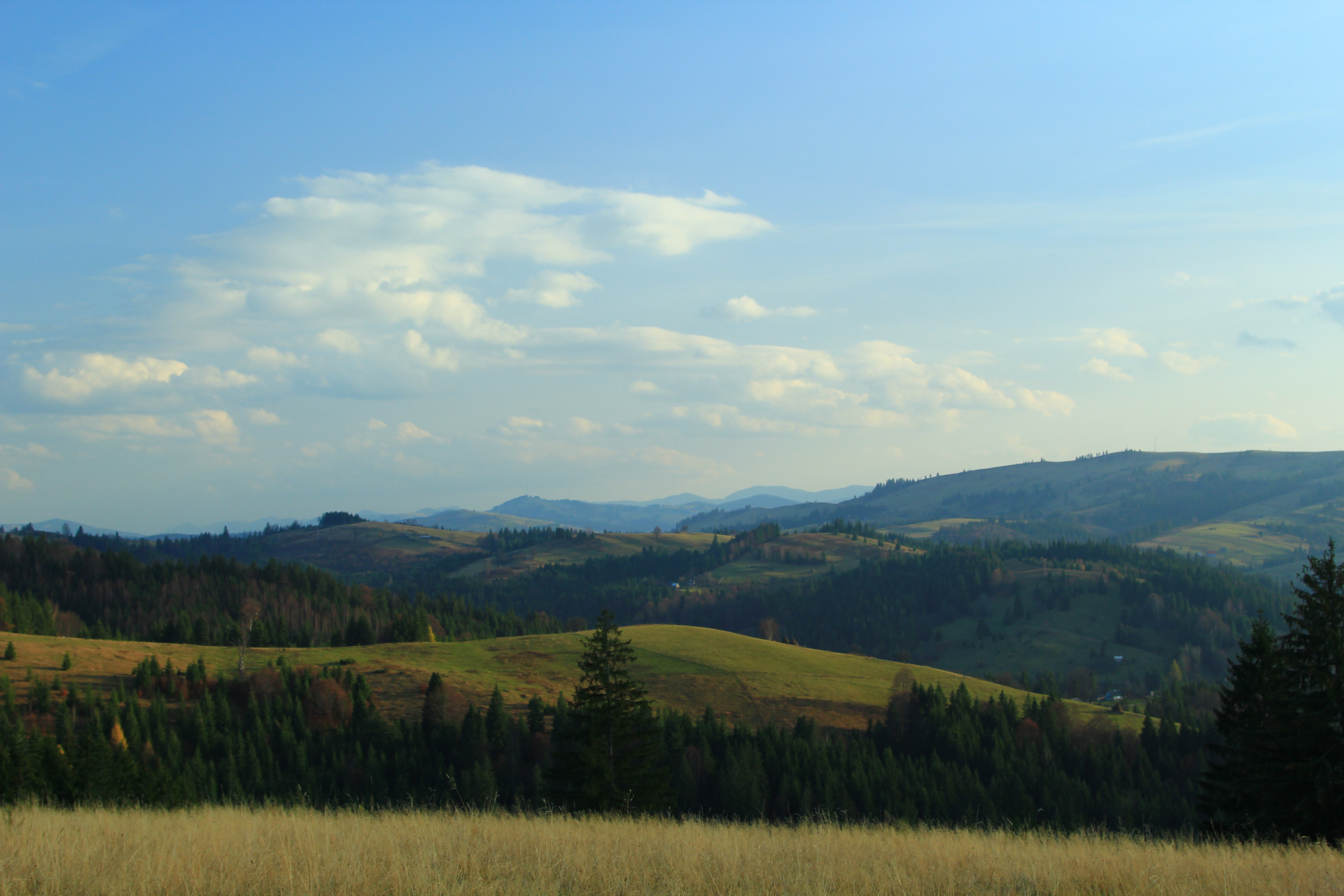
- Interactive map of Cheremoshna
- Location in Ivano-Frankivsk Oblast
- Coordinates: 48°2′34″N 24°55′48″E
- Country: Ukraine
- Oblast: Ivano-Frankivsk Oblast
- Raion: Verkhovyna Raion
- Hromada: Biloberizka rural hromada

Population (2001)
  - Total: 651
- Time zone: UTC+2 (EET)
  - Summer (DST): UTC+3 (EEST)
- Postal code: 78732

Cheremoshna (Ukrainian: Черемошна) is a village in the Biloberizka rural hromada of the Verkhovyna Raion of Ivano-Frankivsk Oblast in Ukraine. After the liquidation of the Verkhovyna Raion (1940–2020) on 19 July 2020, the village became part of the Verkhovyna Raion.

== People from Cheremoshna ==
- Halyna Petrosanyak (born 1969), a Ukrainian poet, writer, and translator, was born in the village.

== Bibliography ==
- "Fereskul, pow. kossowski". Geographical Dictionary of the Kingdom of Poland (in Polish). 2. Warszawa: Kasa im. Józefa Mianowskiego. 1881. p. 383.
