= Barvinkiv =

Rural locality in Ivano-Frankivsk Oblast, Ukraine

Barvinkiv Барвінків
- Interactive map of Barvinkiv
- Location in Ivano-Frankivsk Oblast
- Coordinates: 48°07′04″N 25°01′58″E
- Country: Ukraine
- Oblast: Ivano-Frankivsk Oblast
- Raion: Verkhovyna Raion
- Hromada: Biloberizka rural hromada

Population (2001)
  - Total: 291
- Time zone: UTC+2 (EET)
  - Summer (DST): UTC+3 (EEST)
- Postal code: 78713

Barvinkiv (Ukrainian: Барвінків) is a village in the Biloberizka rural hromada of the Verkhovyna Raion of Ivano-Frankivsk Oblast in Ukraine. After the liquidation of the Verkhovyna Raion (1940–2020) on 19 July 2020, the village became part of the Verkhovyna Raion.

== Bibliography ==
- "Berwinkowa, pow. kosowski". Geographical Dictionary of the Kingdom of Poland (in Polish). 1. Warszawa: Kasa im. Józefa Mianowskiego. 1880. p. 155.
