= Hramotne =

Rural locality in Ivano-Frankivsk Oblast, Ukraine

Hramotne Грамотне
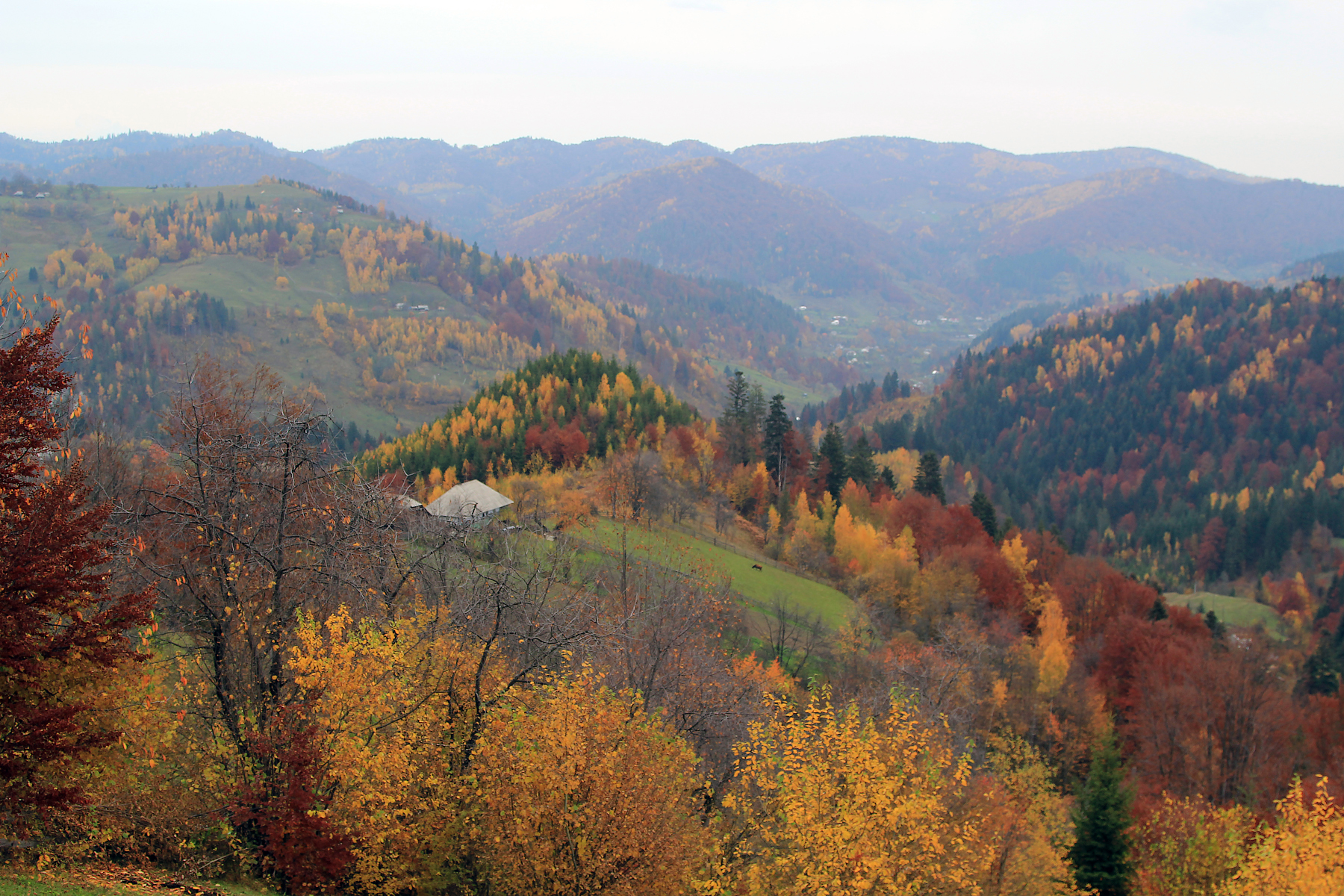
- Carpathians near Hramotne

- Location in Ivano-Frankivsk Oblast
- Coordinates: 47°57′21″N 24°50′44″E
- Country: Ukraine
- Oblast: Ivano-Frankivsk Oblast
- Raion: Verkhovyna Raion
- Hromada: Biloberizka rural hromada
- Time zone: UTC+2 (EET)
  - Summer (DST): UTC+3 (EEST)
- Postal code: 78737

Hramotne (Ukrainian: Грамотне) is a village in the Biloberizka rural hromada of the Verkhovyna Raion of Ivano-Frankivsk Oblast in Ukraine.

== History ==
On 2 October 2015, through the merger of Biloberizka, Usteriky and Khorotseve rural councils, the village became part of the Biloberizka rural hromada.

On 19 July 2020, as a result of the administrative-territorial reform and liquidation of the Verkhovyna Raion, the village became part of the newly formed Verkhovyna Raion.

== Notable residents ==
- Oksana Rubaniak (born 2003), Ukrainian poet, writer, civic activist, servicewoman
