= Zelene rural hromada =

Hromada in Ivano-Frankivsk Oblast, Ukraine

Zelene rural hromada Зеленська сільська громада
- Hromada
- Interactive map of Zelene rural hromada
- Country: Ukraine
- Oblast: Ivano-Frankivsk
- Raion: Verkhovyna

Area
  - Total: 487.3 km^{2} (188.1 sq mi)

Population (2023)
  - Total: 1,930
  - Density: 3.96/km^{2} (10.3/sq mi)
- Settlements: 6
- Villages: 6
- Website: zelenska-gromada.gov.ua

Zelene rural territorial hromada (Ukrainian: Зеленська сільська територіальна громада, romanized: Zelenska silska terytorialna hromada) is a hromada in Verkhovyna Raion, Ivano-Frankivsk Oblast, in western Ukraine. Its administrative centre is the village of Zelene.

The hromada has an area of 487.3 km^{2} (188.1 mi^{2}), as well as a population of 1,930 (as of 2023).

Zelene hromada is one of fourteen hromadas together forming an association dedicated to preserving Hutsul traditions and expanding the tourism industry in the region.

== Composition ==
Zelene rural hromada contains six villages:

- Burkut
- Bystrets
- Dzembronia
- Topilche
- Yavirnyk
- Zelene
