= Biloberizka rural hromada =

Rural hromada in Ivano-Frankivsk Oblast, Ukraine

Biloberizka rural hromada Білоберізька сільська громада
- Hromada
- Interactive map of Biloberizka rural hromada
- Country: Ukraine
- Oblast: Ivano-Frankivsk
- Raion: Verkhovyna

Area
  - Total: 353.8 km^{2} (136.6 sq mi)

Population (2023)
  - Total: 1,930
  - Density: 5.46/km^{2} (14.1/sq mi)
- Settlements: 17
- Villages: 17
- Website: biloberizkaotg.gov.ua

Biloberizka rural territorial hromada (Ukrainian: Білоберізька сільська територіальна громада, romanized: Biloberizka silska terytorialna hromada) is one of the hromadas of Ukraine, located in Verkhovyna Raion in the country's western Ivano-Frankivsk Oblast.

The size of the hromada is 353.8 km^{2} (136.6 mi^{2}). It has a population of 2,779 (as of 2023). Biloberizka rural hromada was originally established as an amalgamated hromada in March 2016 before it was re-established in its current form in 2020.

== Composition ==
Biloberizka rural hromada includes 17 villages:

- Barvinkiv
- Bila Richka
- Biloberizka
- Cheremoshna
- Dovhopole
- Holoshyna
- Hramotne
- Hryniava
- Khorotseve
- Kokhan
- Polianky
- Probiinivka
- Senkivske
- Stebni
- Stovpni
- Usteriky
- Yablunytsia
