= Zelene, Ivano-Frankivsk Oblast =

Rural locality in Ivano-Frankivsk Oblast, Ukraine

Zelene Зелене
- Village
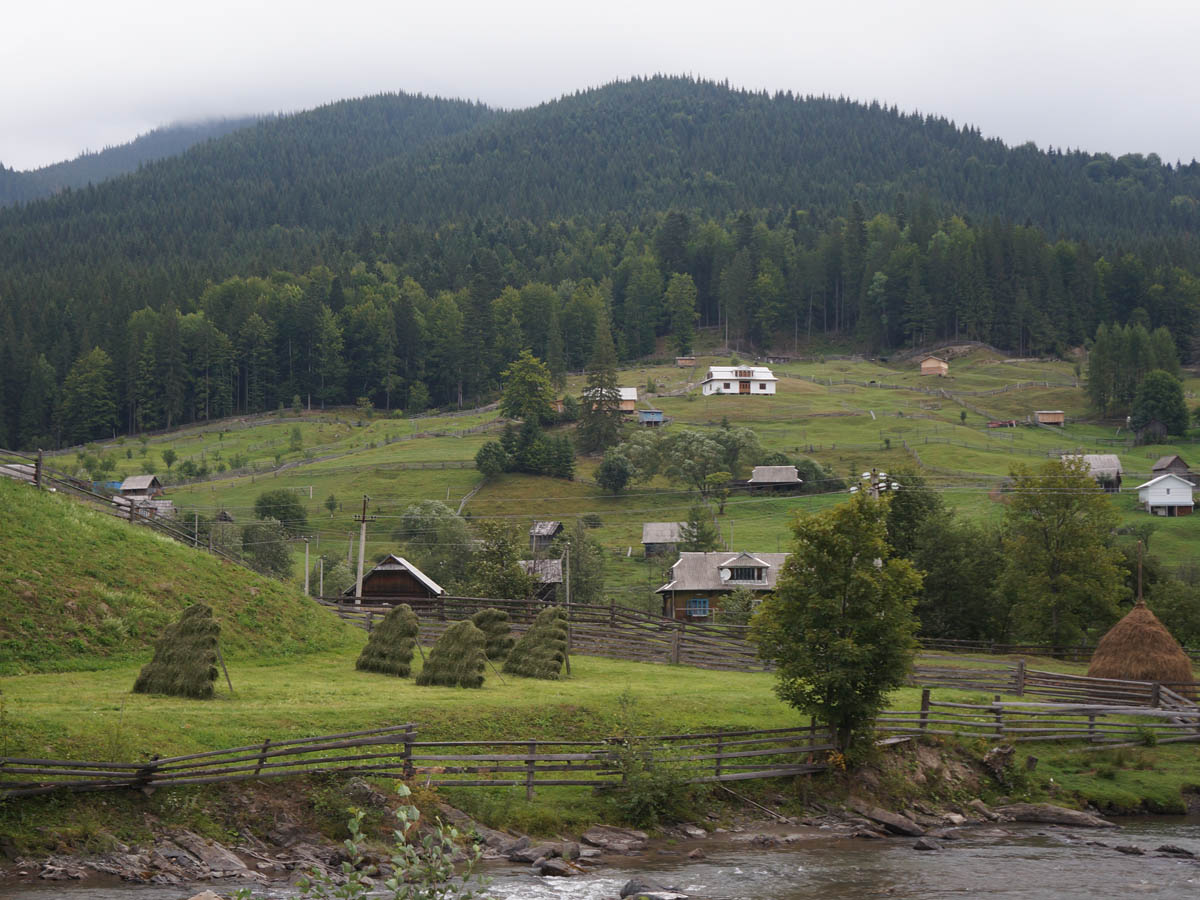
- Interactive map of Zelene
- Location within Ukraine Location within Ivano-Frankivsk Oblast
- Coordinates: 48°03′03″N 24°45′22″E
- Country: Ukraine
- Oblast: Ivano-Frankivsk Oblast
- Raion: Verkhovyna Raion
- Hromada: Zelene rural hromada
- Elevation: 797 m (2,615 ft)

Population (2001)
  - Total: 814
- Time zone: UTC+02:00 (EET)
  - Summer (DST): UTC+03:00 (EEST)
- Postal code: 78730
- Area code: +380 3432

Zelene (Ukrainian: Зелене) is a village in the Verkhovyna Raion of the Ivano-Frankivsk Oblast of Ukraine. The village is located 22 km (14 mi) from Verkhovyna and 43 km (27 mi) from Vorokhta railway station. Zelene lies within the boundaries of the Carpathian National Nature Park. It hosts the administration of Zelene rural hromada, one of the hromadas of Ukraine.

== History ==
Zelene was founded in the 15th century and was initially in the Ruthenian Voivodeship as part of the Polish crown and from 1772 to 1918, under its Polish name Zełene, it was part of Galicia and Lodmeria.

After the end of World War I, Zelene became part of the Second Polish Republic and was here in 1921, it was assigned to Stanisławów Voivodeship. With the beginning of World War II, the village was first occupied by the Soviet Union and from 1941 to 1944 by Germany, which incorporated the place into the district of Galicia. In 1945, Zelene was recaptured by the Soviet Union, where it became part of the Ukrainian SSR and since 1991 it has been part of today's Ukraine. Until 15 July 1993, the village was called Zelena (Зелена) and was then renamed back to its current name.

== Demographics ==
According to the 1989 Soviet census, the population of Zelene was 757, of which 386 were men and 371 were women. According to the 2001 census, 814 people lived in the village.

=== Languages ===
Native language as of the Ukrainian Census of 2001:

Language	Percentage
Ukrainian	99.88 %
Russian	0.12 %

== Religion ==
In the center of the village, there is a wooden Hutsul church, an architectural monument of national importance. The church is cruciform in plan with a massive central nave and small side arms. Built in 1869, it is used by the parish of the Orthodox Church of Ukraine.
