= Oksana Rubaniak =

Ukrainian poet, writer, civic activist, servicewoman (born 2003)

- Оксана Рубаняк
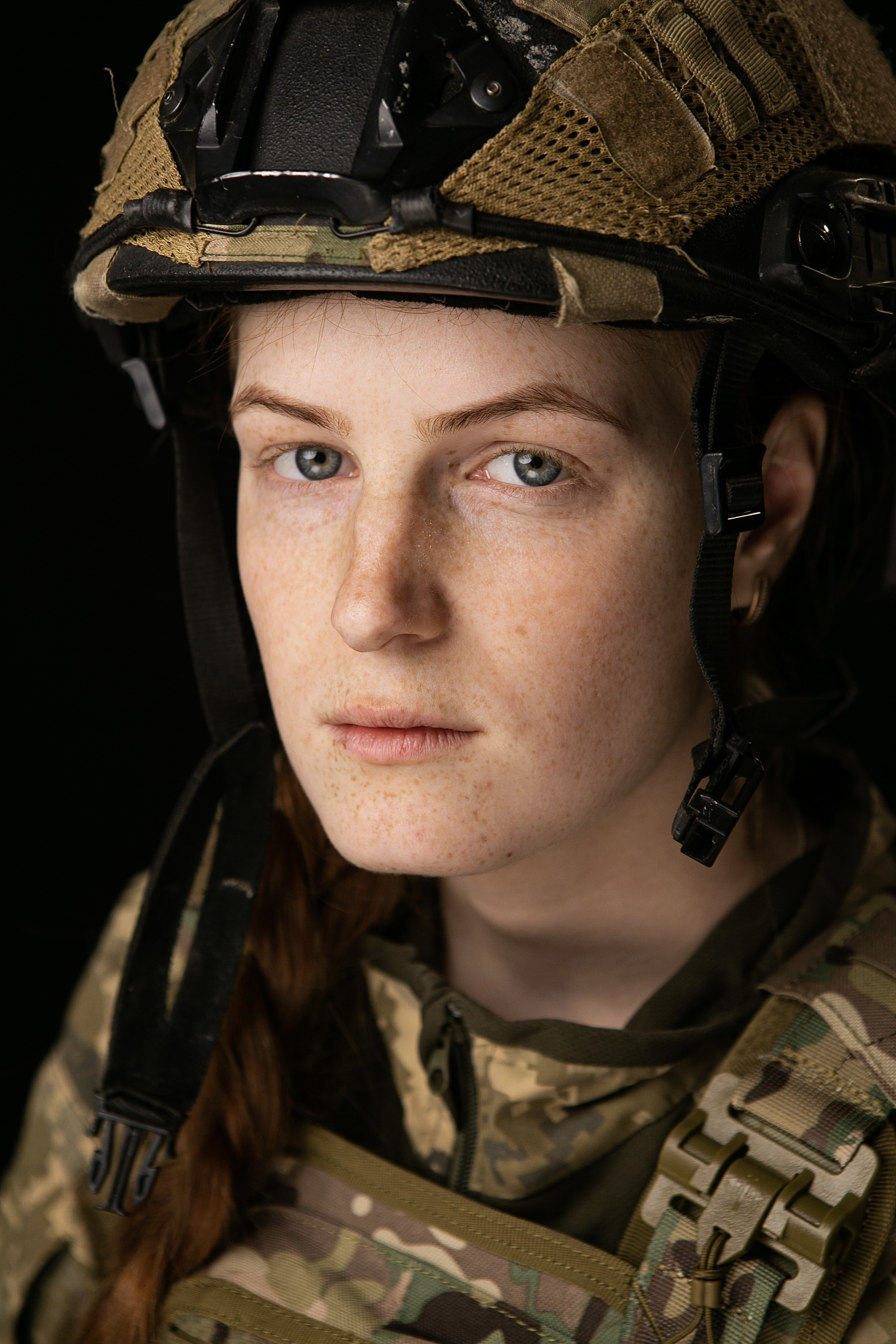
- Born: 28 January 2003 (age 23); Hramotne, Ivano-Frankivsk Oblast, Ukraine
- Education: Vasyl Stefanyk Precarpathian National University, National Pedagogical Drahomanov University
- Occupations: Poet, writer, civic activist, servicewoman
- Awards

Oksana Volodymyrivna Rubaniak (Ukrainian: Оксана Володимирівна Рубаняк; pseudo - Ksena; born 28 January 2003, Hramotne, Ivano-Frankivsk Oblast) is a Ukrainian poet, writer, civic activist, servicewoman (captain), platoon commander of the Armed Forces of Ukraine, and participant of the Russian-Ukrainian war.

== Biography ==
She graduated from the Ivano-Frankivsk College of Vasyl Stefanyk Precarpathian National University (2022, with honors, specialty - primary school teacher), the Military Department of PNU (2021–present, incomplete; joined the Armed Forces of Ukraine in 2022), and the National Pedagogical Drahomanov University (2024, with honors, majoring in Philology), Vasyl Stefanyk Precarpathian National University (2025, bachelor's degree; from 2025, Master's degree; major in Public Management and Administration), University of Lviv (2025, Master's degree, majoring in Foreign Policy and National Security).

She worked as an engaged specialist at the Department of Youth Policy and Sports of the Ivano-Frankivsk City Council. She organized MMA competitions among military personnel.

On 24 February 2022, she joined the ranks of the Volunteer Formation of the Ivano-Frankivsk Territorial Community No. 3, and then the Armed Forces of Ukraine. She is the only woman among the soldiers of the machine gun platoon of the 72nd Mechanized Brigade. She performed combat missions at the Vuhlehirsk thermal power plant, Zaitseve, as well as on the Bakhmut, Marianka and Vuhledar directions. This year, it was featured on a postcard issued by Ukrposhta entitled "Ukrainian Ground Forces".

In March 2023, she was seriously injured in Vuhledar. In late June of the same year, she returned to the front.

From November 2023 to December 2024, she was the commander of a platoon of unmanned aerial vehicles of the Armed Forces of Ukraine. In March 2024, Oksana's photo appeared on the cover of Vogue Ukraine, and later she was included in the rating "UP 100. Power of Women" according to the Ukrainska Pravda. In September of the same year, she was included in the rating "30 Under 30: Future Leaders" by Forbes Ukraine.

From December 2024, she has served as the commander of a strike drone company in the Armed Forces of Ukraine.

== Public activities ==
Rubaniak is an active participant in international and national forums, where she addresses the role of the Armed Forces of Ukraine and the necessity of international support for the state.

In January 2024, she was a speaker at the international forum "Protection and Respect: The Role of Women in Achieving Peace," organized by the ArmWomenNow foundation. In March 2024, the Ukrainska Pravda media outlet included her in its "UP 100: Power of Women" list, where she also served as a keynote speaker during the award ceremony. In November 2024, she participated in the 8th Ukrainian Women's Congress.

Her international engagements include several high-profile appearances across Europe. In November 2024, she attended the Aspen Conference in Prague, where she held a private meeting with the President of the Czech Republic, Petr Pavel. In June 2025, she presented the Ukrainian military experience in Paris during a screening of the documentary Our War (French: Notre Guerre), directed by Bernard-Henri Lévy.

In September 2025, Rubaniak was a featured speaker on the "How to End the War?" discussion panel at the Yalta European Strategy (YES) conference.

== Creative work ==
She is the author of the poetry collections "Ornamenty doli" (2020) "Nazustrich smerti" (2023), "Doroha zhyttia" (2024), and "Narodzheni u voli ne boiatsia smerti" (2025, from the series "100 poezii. suchasnist" by the publishing house "Folio").

Co-author of the books "Stezhky viiny, stezhky liubovi" (2024) and "Metaromantyka" (2025).

== Awards ==
- Order for Courage, 3rd class (8 March 2025)
- a scholarship holder of the President of Ukraine (23 September 2020), the heads of the Ivano-Frankivsk Regional State Administration and Ivano-Frankivsk Regional Council (29 September 2020), and the Lozynski Foundation (2023)
- Gratitude from the Mayor of Ivano-Frankivsk (17 November 2021)
- Award of the Mayor of Ivano-Frankivsk "For Honor and Victory" (29 March 2023)
- President of Ukraine award "For Defense of Ukraine" (2023)
- Prize of the Cabinet of Ministers of Ukraine for Special Achievements of Youth in the Development of Ukraine in 2023
- NSDC badge "Defender of Ukraine" (February 2024)
- Honorary Badge of the Commander-in-Chief of the Armed Forces of Ukraine "Golden Cross" (2024)
- Mariyka Pidhiryanka Prize in the Literature nomination (2024)
- Bohdan Khmelnytskyi Prize (2024)
- Bohdan Ihor Antonych Prize (2025)
