= Cheremosh =

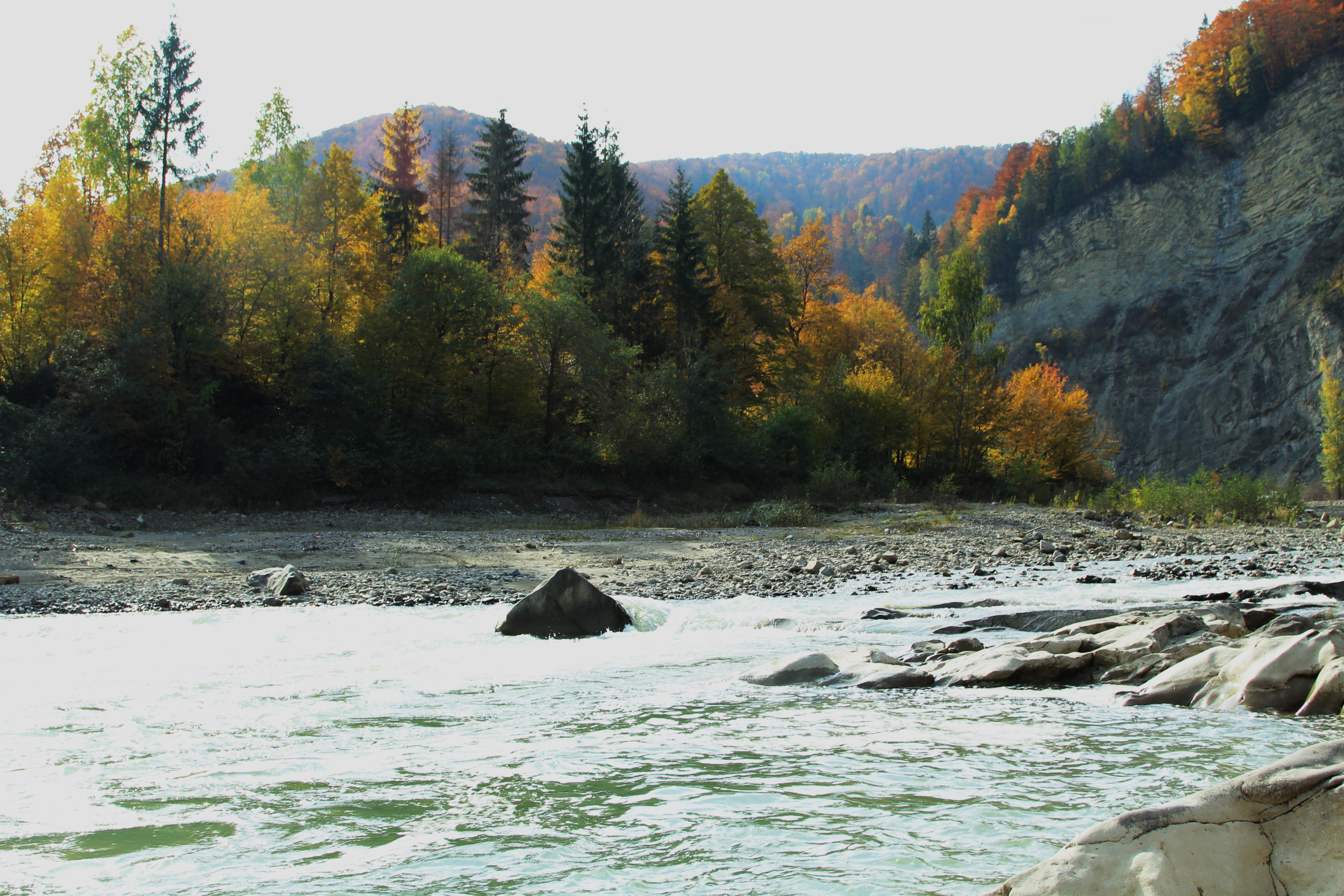
- Cheremosh in Vyzhnytsia Raion

Location
- Country: Ukraine

Physical characteristics
- Mouth
  - location: Prut at Nepolokivtsi
  - coordinates: 48.3789°N 25.6206°E
- Length: 80 km (50 mi)

Basin features
- Progression: Prut→ Danube→ Black Sea
- Tributaries
  - left: Chornyi Cheremosh
  - right: Bilyi Cheremosh, Putylka

The Cheremosh River (Ukrainian: Черемош; Romanian: Ceremuș; Polish: Czeremosz) is a river in western Ukraine, right-bank tributary of the river Prut.

== Description ==
It is formed by confluence of two upper streams of the river Bilyi Cheremosh (White Cheremosh) and Chornyi Cheremosh (Black Cheremosh) near the village Usteriky (Verkhovyna Raion) and has a length of 80 km (50 mi). Chornyi Cheremosh is 87 km long with a basin of 856 km^{2} and Bilyi Cheremosh is 61 km long with a basin of 606 km^{2}. The river starts in the Carpathian Mountains and flows roughly SW to NE. It leaves the Bukovina Obchinas (a mountain range in Outer Eastern Carpathians stretching to Ukraine and Romania) to the river's right, and the historic subregion of Pokuttia to the river's left side.

It flows along the borderline of the historic regions of Bukovina and Galicia. In the Middle Ages and the early modern era, it was part of the borderline between the Principality of Moldavia and Kingdom of Poland. During the first half of the 20th century, it also acted as the border between Romania and Poland. Currently, it runs along the borderline between the Ivano-Frankivsk and Chernivtsi Oblasts.

Both banks in the upper part of the river are inhabited by Hutsuls.

== Gallery ==
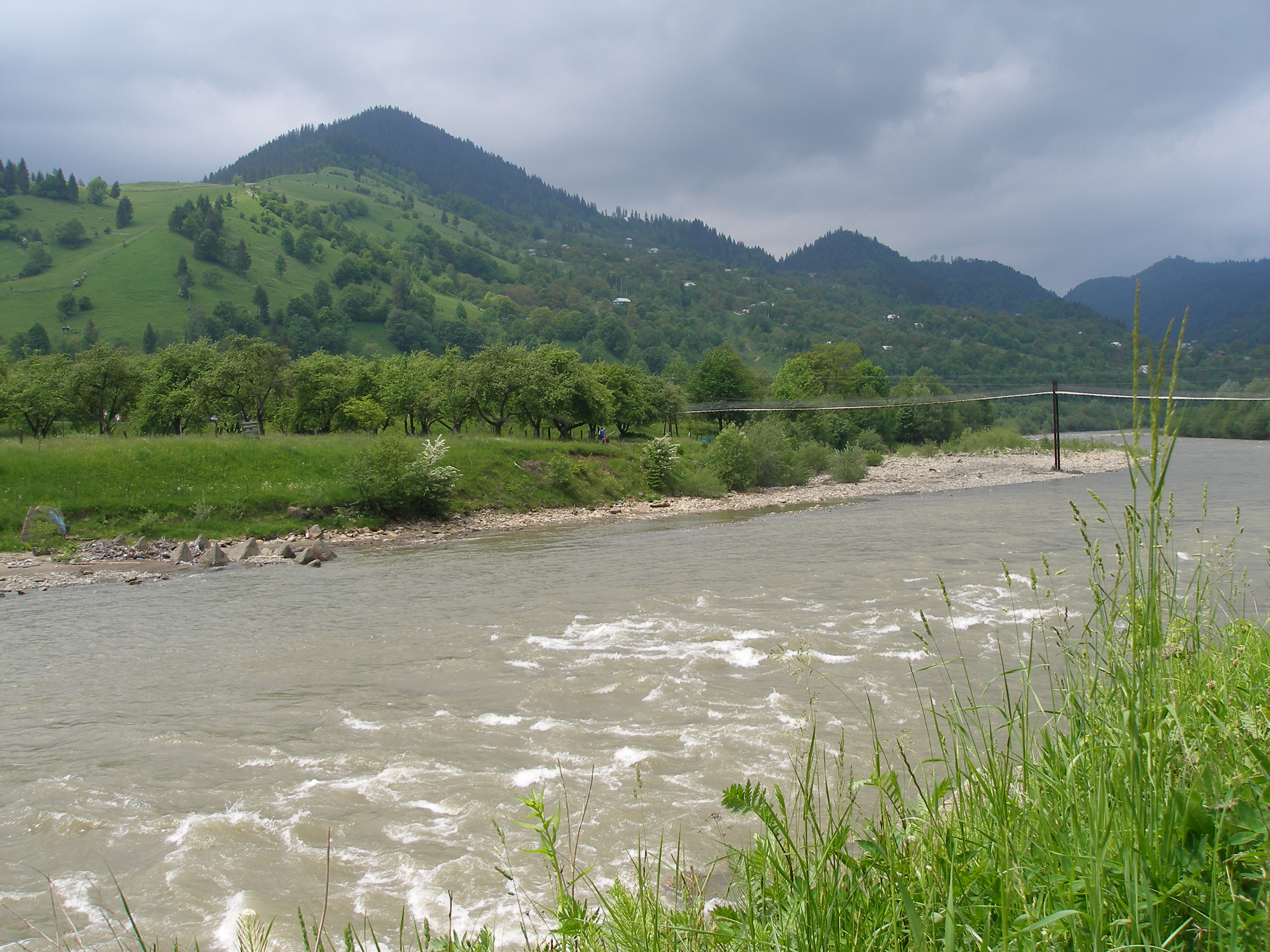

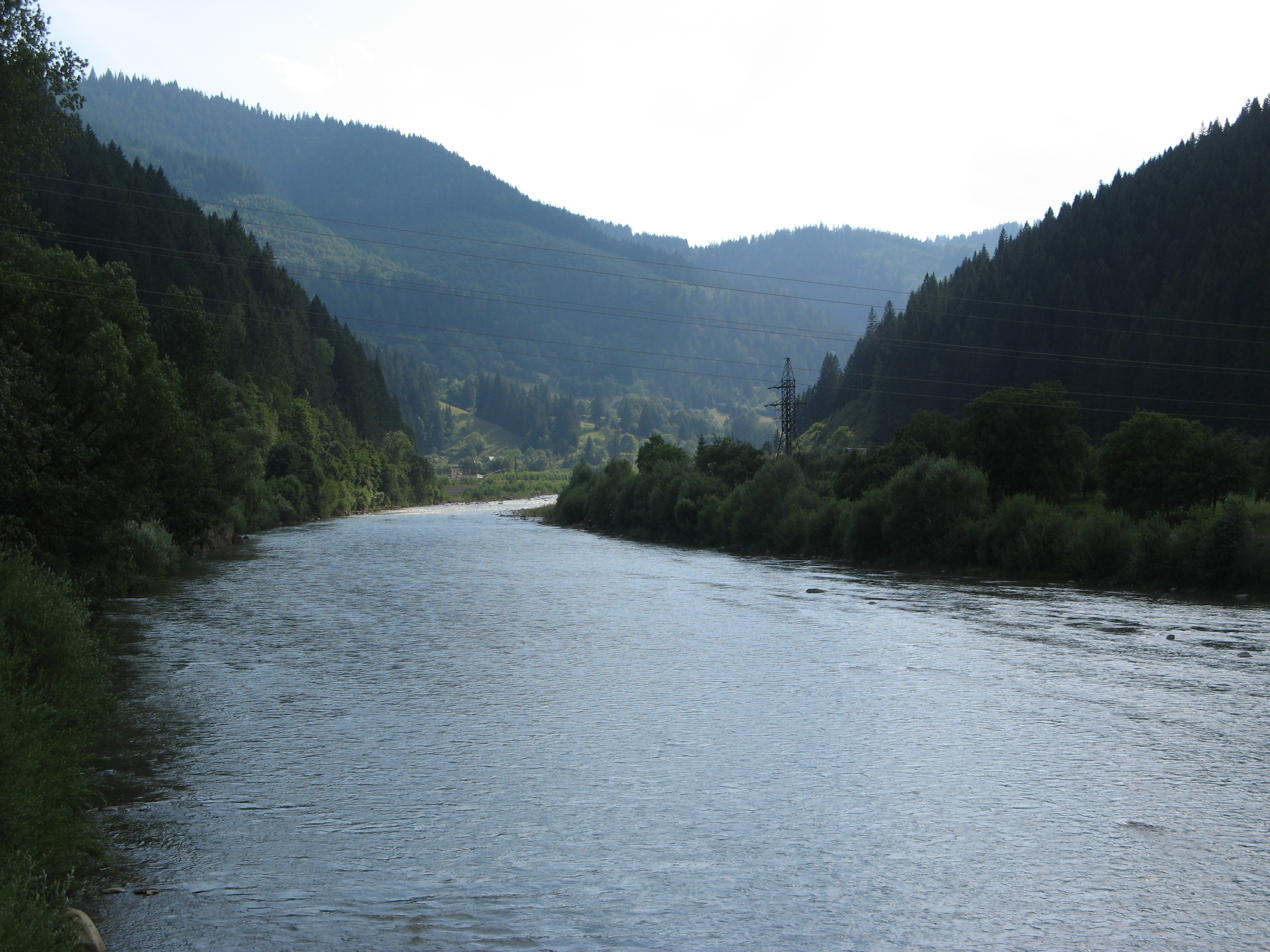

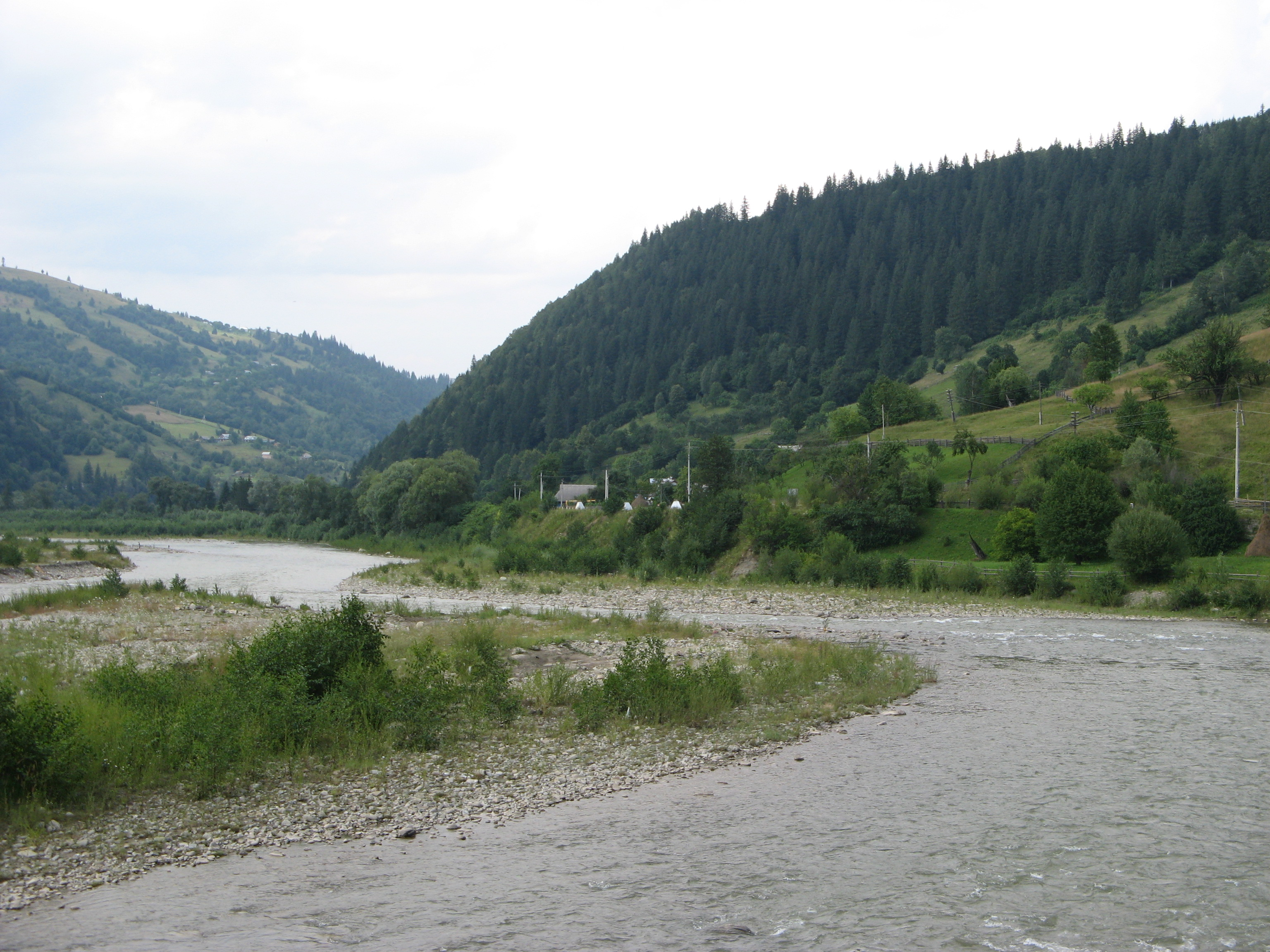

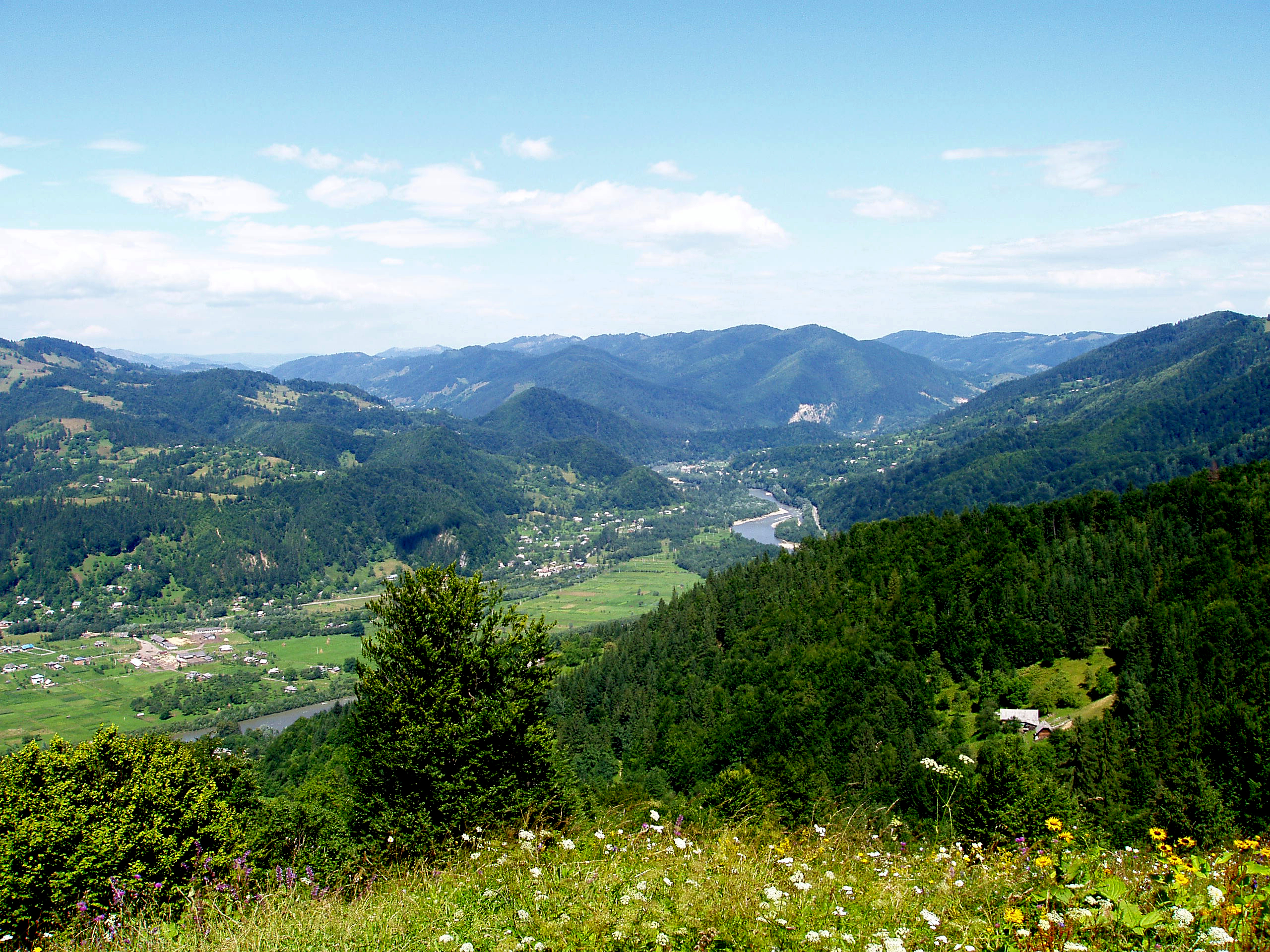

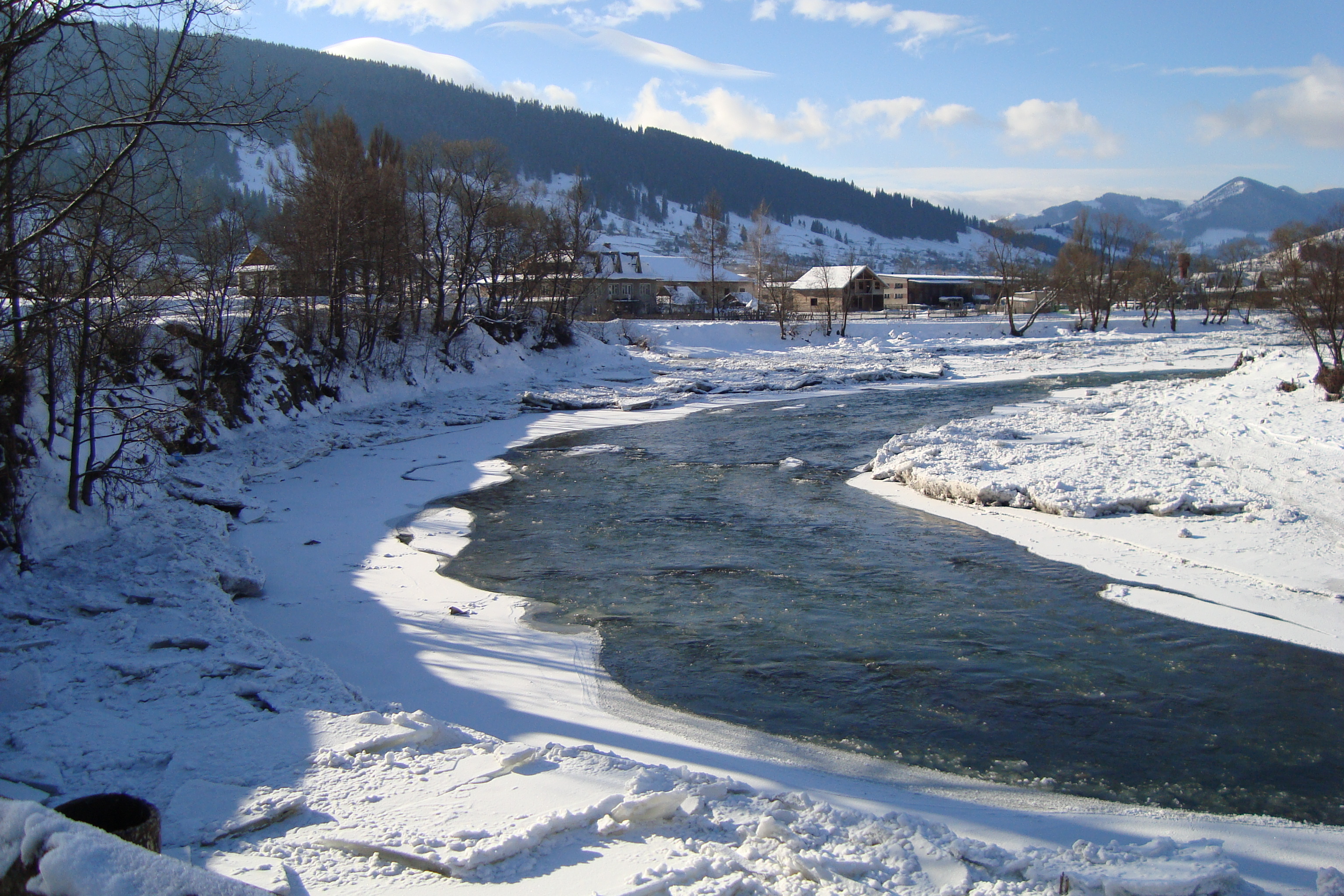
Chornyi Cheremosh

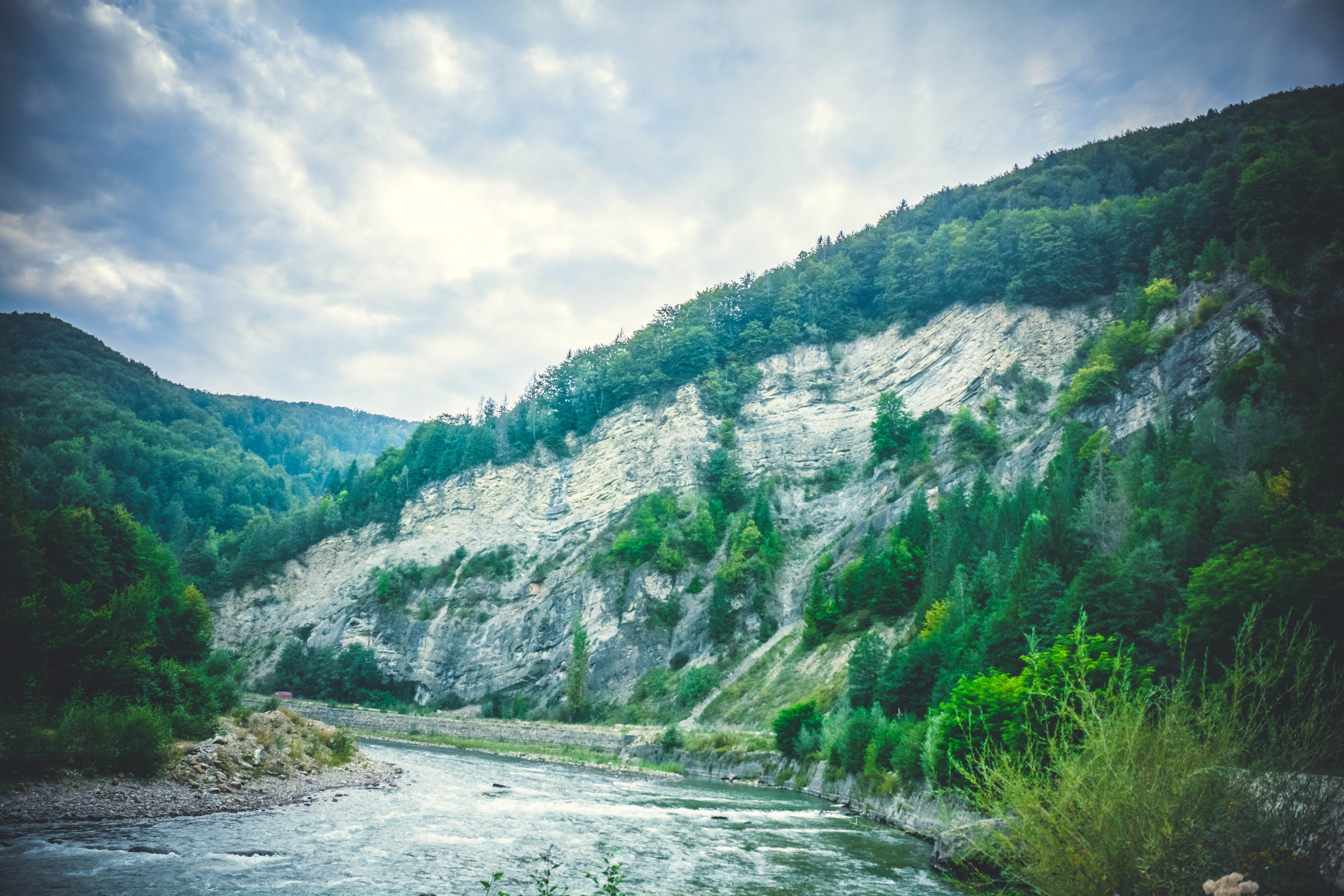

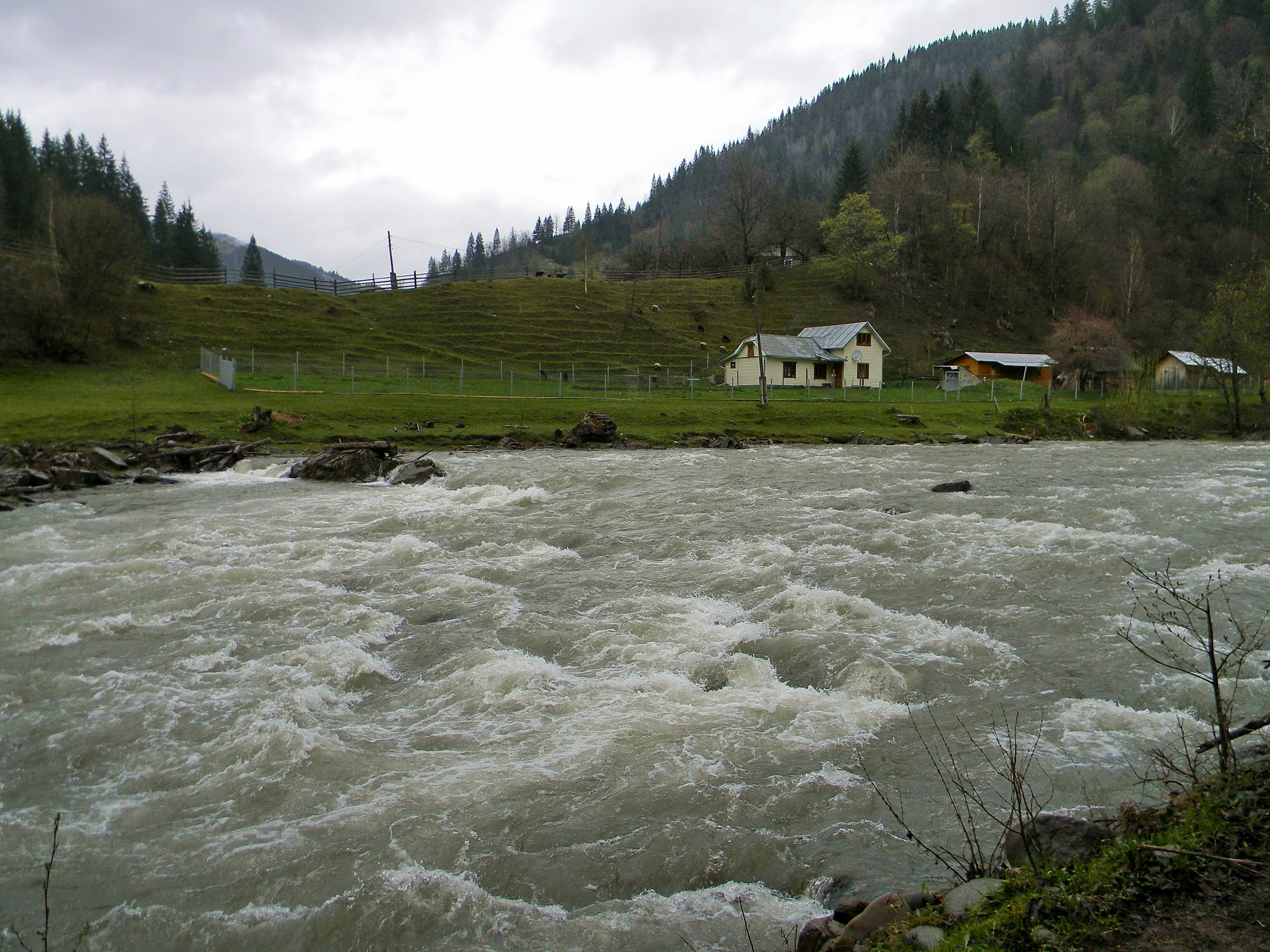

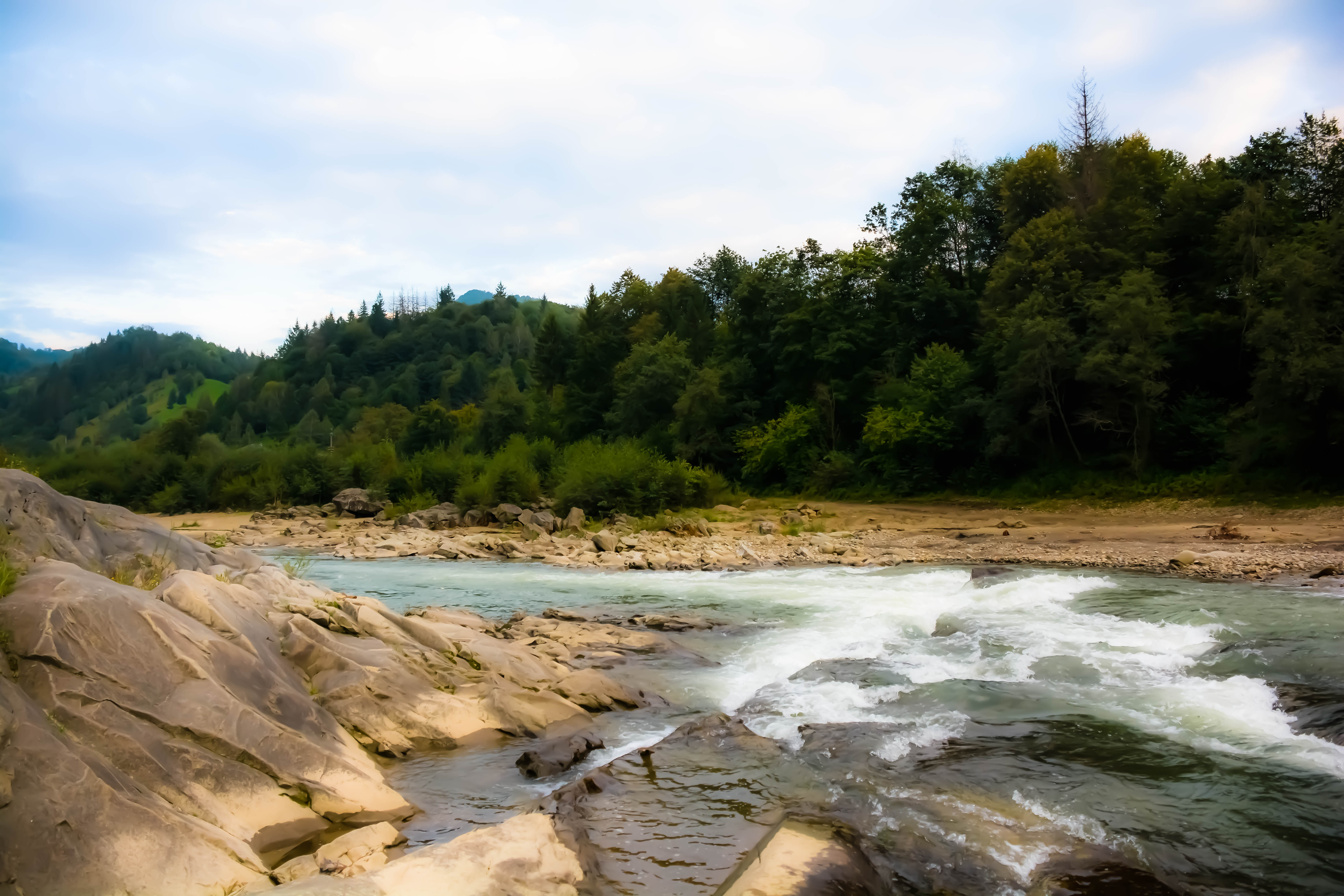

== Towns in basin ==
- Verkhovyna
- Kuty
- Vyzhnytsya
- Vashkivtsi

== See also ==
- Pokuttya
- Bukovina
- Cheremosh Ukrainian Dance Company, named for the river
