= Verkhovyna =

Rural locality in Ivano-Frankivsk Oblast, Ukraine

Verkhovyna Верховина Жаб'є · Żabie
- Rural settlement
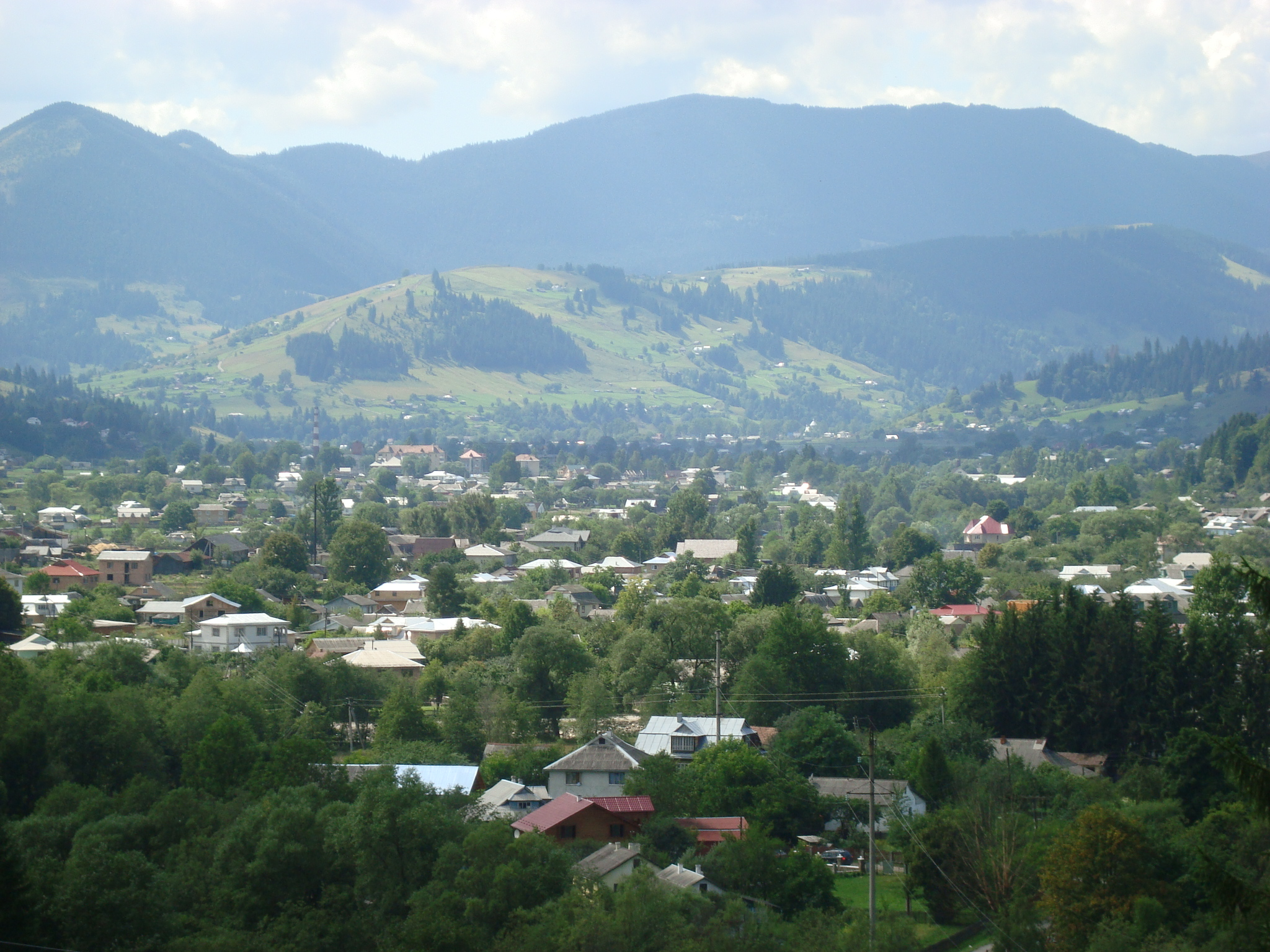
- Skyline of Verkhovyna

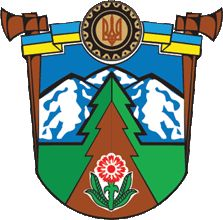
- Coat of arms
- Interactive map of Verkhovyna
- Location of Verkhovyna, Ukraine Verkhovyna (Ukraine)
- Coordinates: 48°09′06″N 24°48′49″E
- Country: Ukraine
- Oblast: Ivano-Frankivsk Oblast
- Raion: Verkhovyna Raion
- Hromada: Verkhovyna settlement hromada
- First mentioned: 1424

Area
  - Total: 51.80 km^{2} (20.00 sq mi)
- Elevation: 619 m (2,031 ft)

Population (2022)
  - Total: 5,773
  - Density: 111.4/km^{2} (288.6/sq mi)
- Postal code: 78700
- Area code: +380 3432

Verkhovyna (Ukrainian: Верховина, IPA: [werxoˈwɪnɐ]), known as Zhabie (Ukrainian: Жаб'є, Polish: Żabie) until 1962, is a rural settlement in Ivano-Frankivsk Oblast, western Ukraine. Verkhovyna serves as the administrative center of Verkhovyna Raion. It also hosts the administration of Verkhovyna settlement hromada, one of the hromadas of Ukraine. Population: 5,773 (2022 estimate).

It was originally established as Żabie in 1424.

The town is located in the Hutsul region of the Carpathian Mountains called Pokuttia, upon the Cheremosh River, a tributary of the Prut. Verkhovyna is currently an important tourist center in Ukraine. The town's name means "highland place."

In 1919–1939, Żabie belonged to Poland and was located in the Kosów Powiat (county) of the Stanisławów Voivodeship. During those years, it was one of the main tourist centers of the country, attracting people from as far away as England. It was also the biggest rural community in Poland (in terms of territory).

There is an Orthodox church, a Hutsul museum and a Polish cemetery with monuments of soldiers of the Polish Border Patrol who died while protecting the pre-1939 border. Another important attraction in Verkhovyna is the Museum of Musical Instruments and Hutsuls Lifestyle founded by Roman Kumlyk.

== Name ==
Ivan Franko once wrote: “Here Zhabie is the Hutsul capital. They say there is no village above Zhabie. And it is in vain to look for a greater calamity." It was until 1962 that Verkhovyna was called Zhabie, there are different versions of the origin of the name — either from the swamp where the first inhabitants settled or from the name of the first inhabitant, who probably came from France and was called Jabie — no one knows the exact information.

In 1962, the settlement was renamed. It was suggested at first to rename it to Frankivsk, in honor of Ivan Franko, but the name Verkhovyna was chosen instead. The name Verkhovyna was suggested because of the many hills that surround the village. When viewed from above, the settlement resembles a bowl, that is, it is in a conventional pit surrounded by hills and mountains.

== History ==
The first written mention of the settlement dates back to 1424: on August 17, Żabie was mentioned in a deed of Grand Duke Švitrigaila.

The Opryshky movement was a peculiar form of struggle and a manifestation of the spontaneous protest of the peasantry against the current system under the Polish-Lithuanian Commonwealth. Many residents of Żabie were active in the detachments of Oleksa Dovbush, Pintea the Brave, Ivan Boichuk, Vasyl Baiurak, etc.

In 1772, as a result of the First Partition of the Polish-Lithuanian Commonwealth between the Russian Empire, Prussia, and the Archduchy of Austria, the lands of the current Verkhovyna Raion entered Austria. Meetings of viche became a mass phenomenon among the highlanders. In the first half of the 19th century in Schabje and neighboring villages, opryshky led by M. Shtoliuk operated.

During the World War I, battles between Austrians and Russians took place in the vicinity of Schabje and other villages. Many Hutsuls fought in the Austro-Hungarian Army, especially in the Ukrainian Sich riflemen's legion.

In April 1920, a peasant uprising took place (named "Hutsul Uprising"), which was suppressed by the Polish authorities. A memorial sign was erected to the participants of the Hutsul Uprising of 1920.

From 1921 to 1939, Żabie was part of the Second Polish Republic. On April 1, 1928, the hamlets (hamlets) of Dzembronya, Bystrets, Zelene, and Yavirnyk were removed from the commune (community) of Żabie, and the self-governing administrative commune of Dzembronya was formed from them. On September 17, 1939, based on the Molotov–Ribbentrop Pact, Soviet troops occupied the territory of Eastern Galicia.

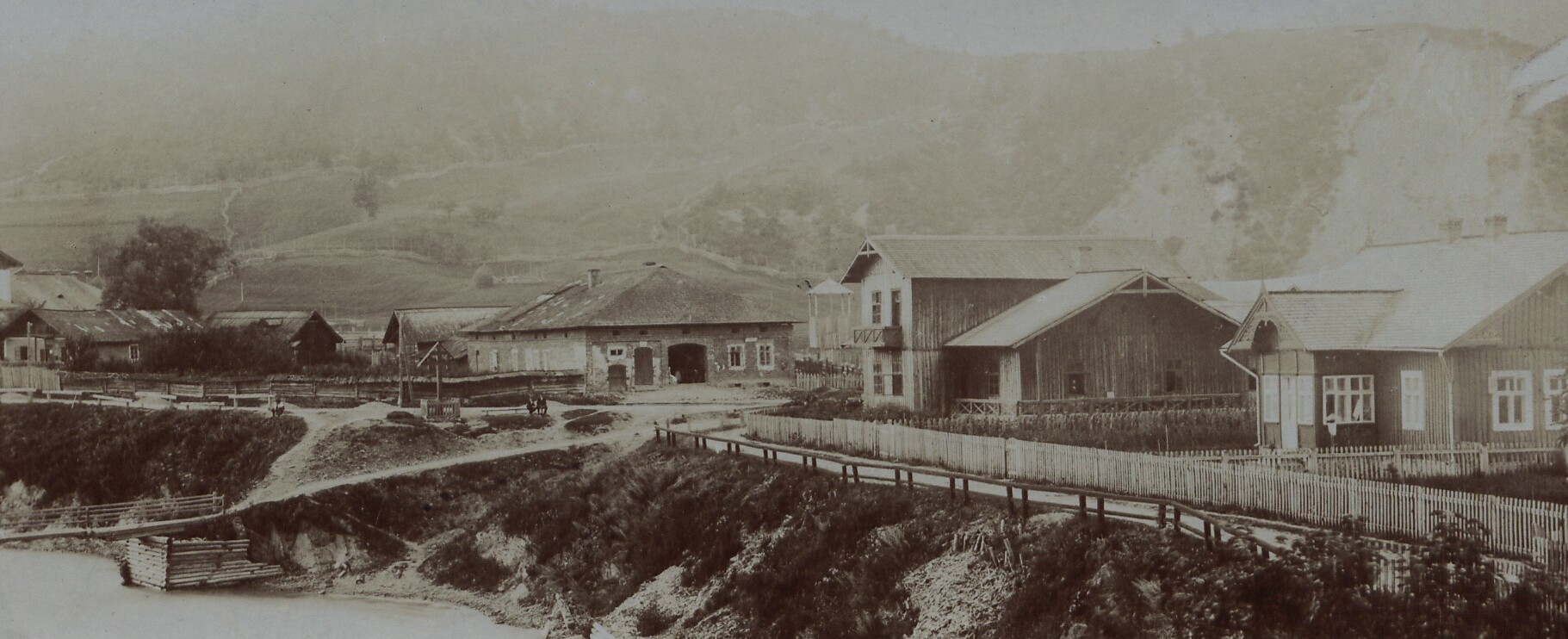
View of the town, before 1914

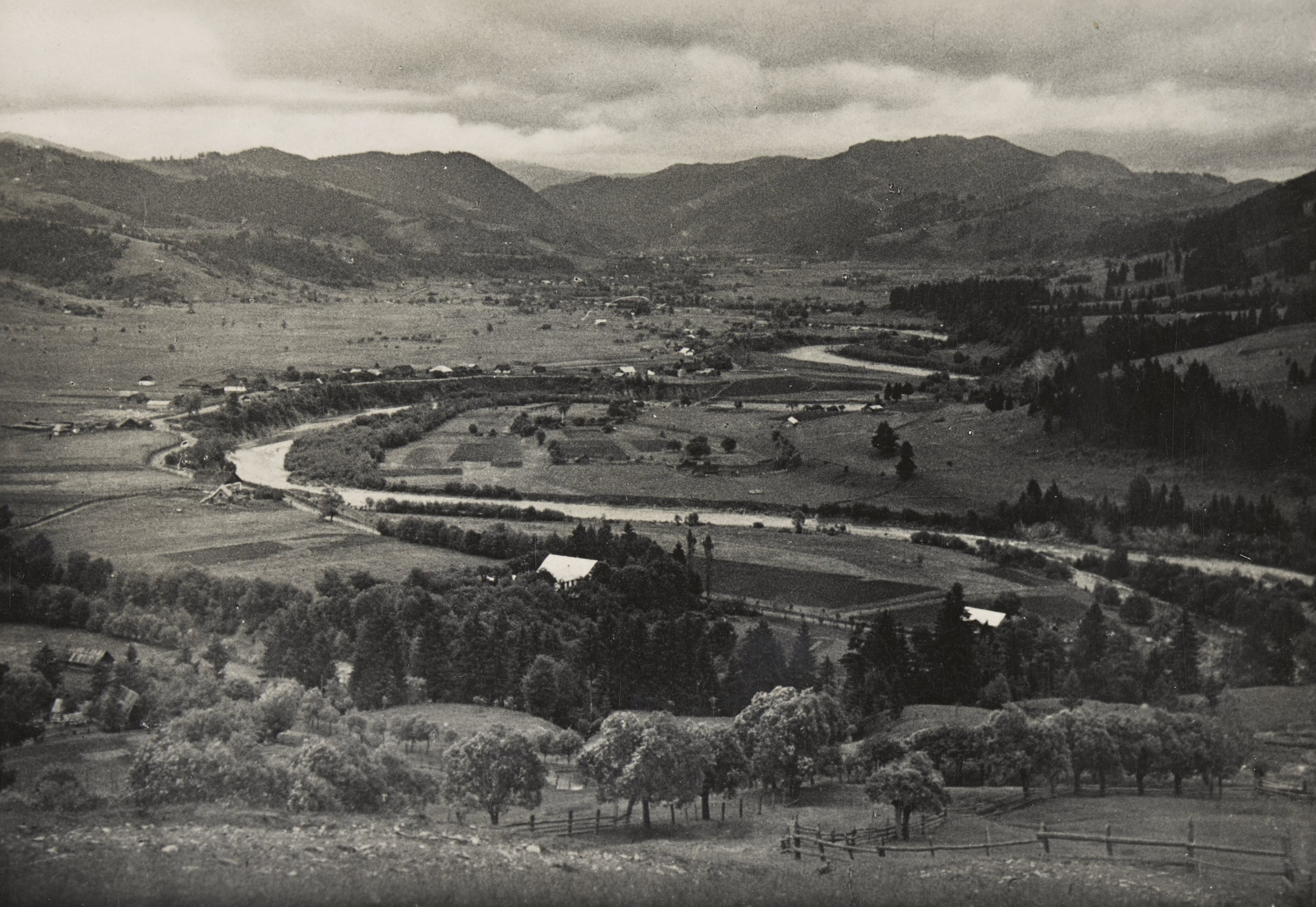
General view of the town, 1939

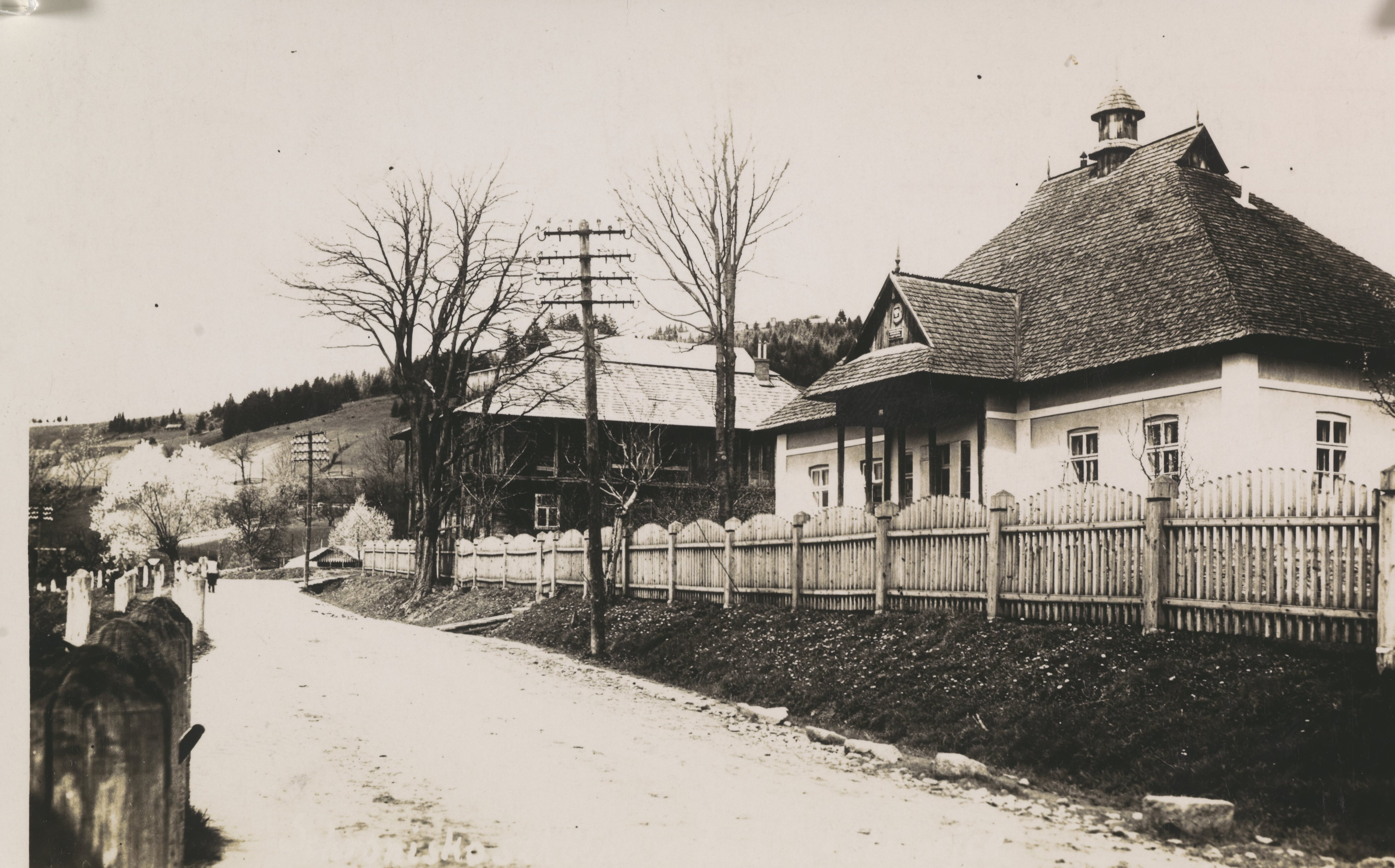
Buildings by the road, before 1939

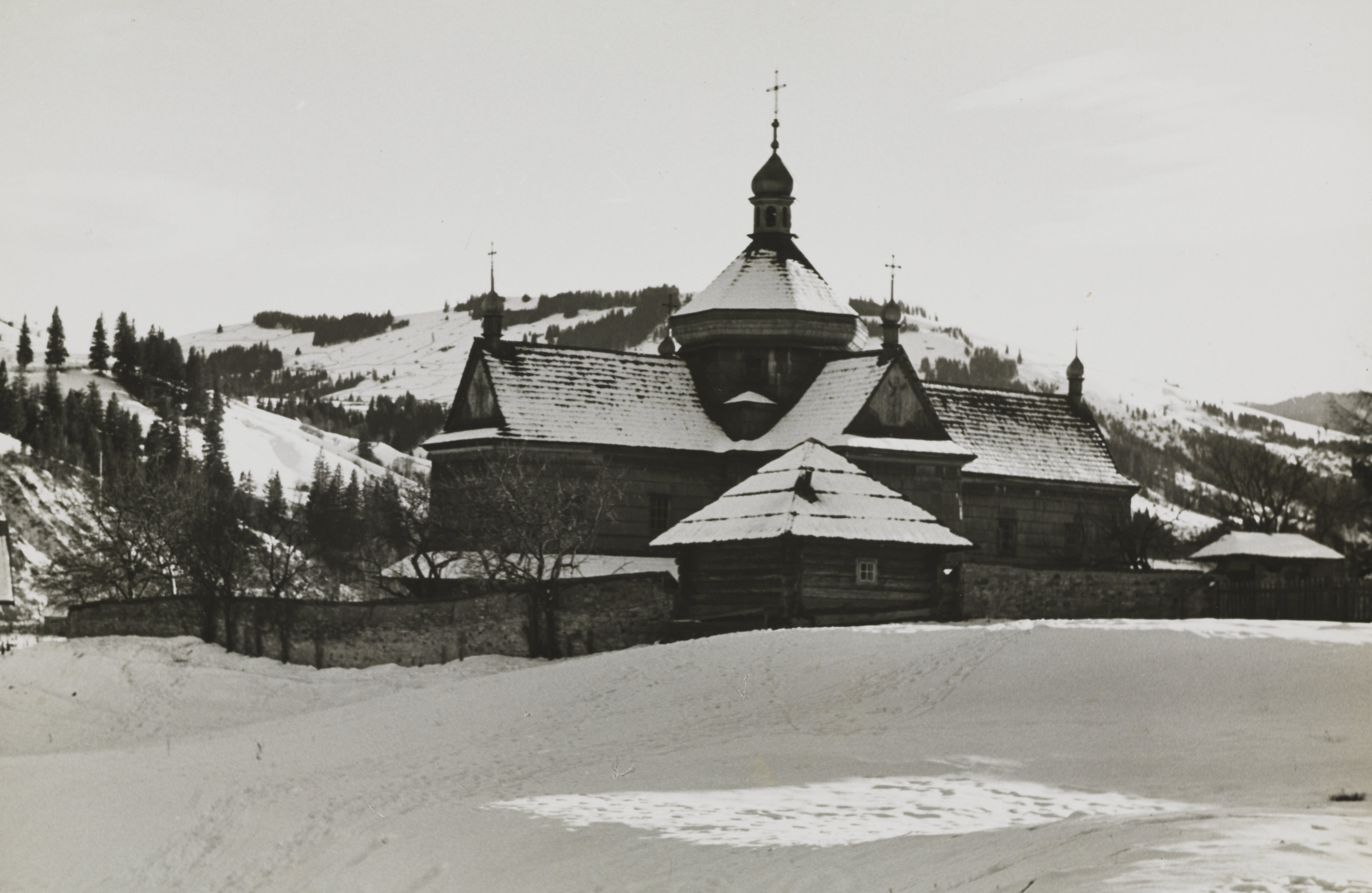
Orthodox church. 1930-1939

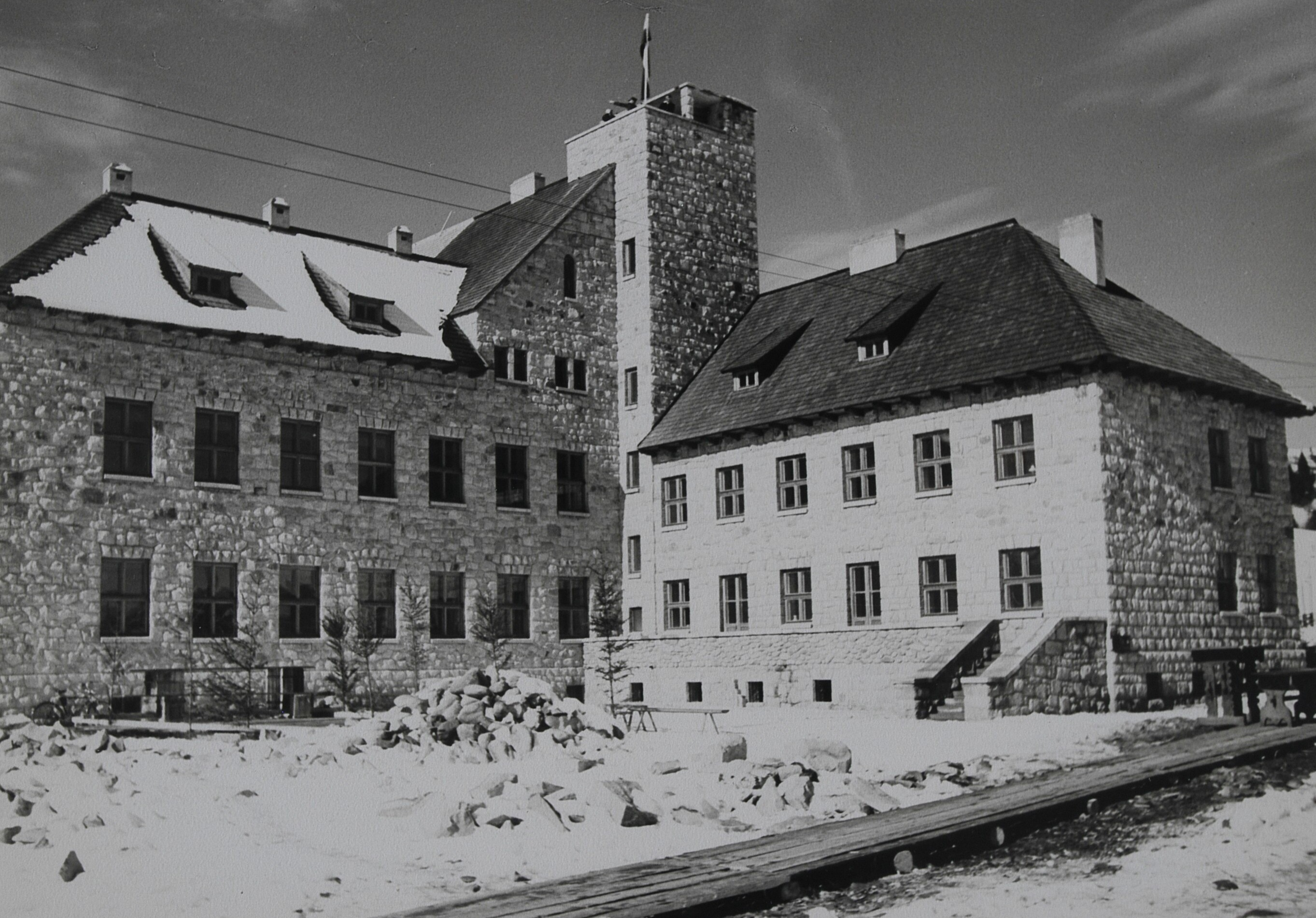
Th Hutsul Museum, 1938

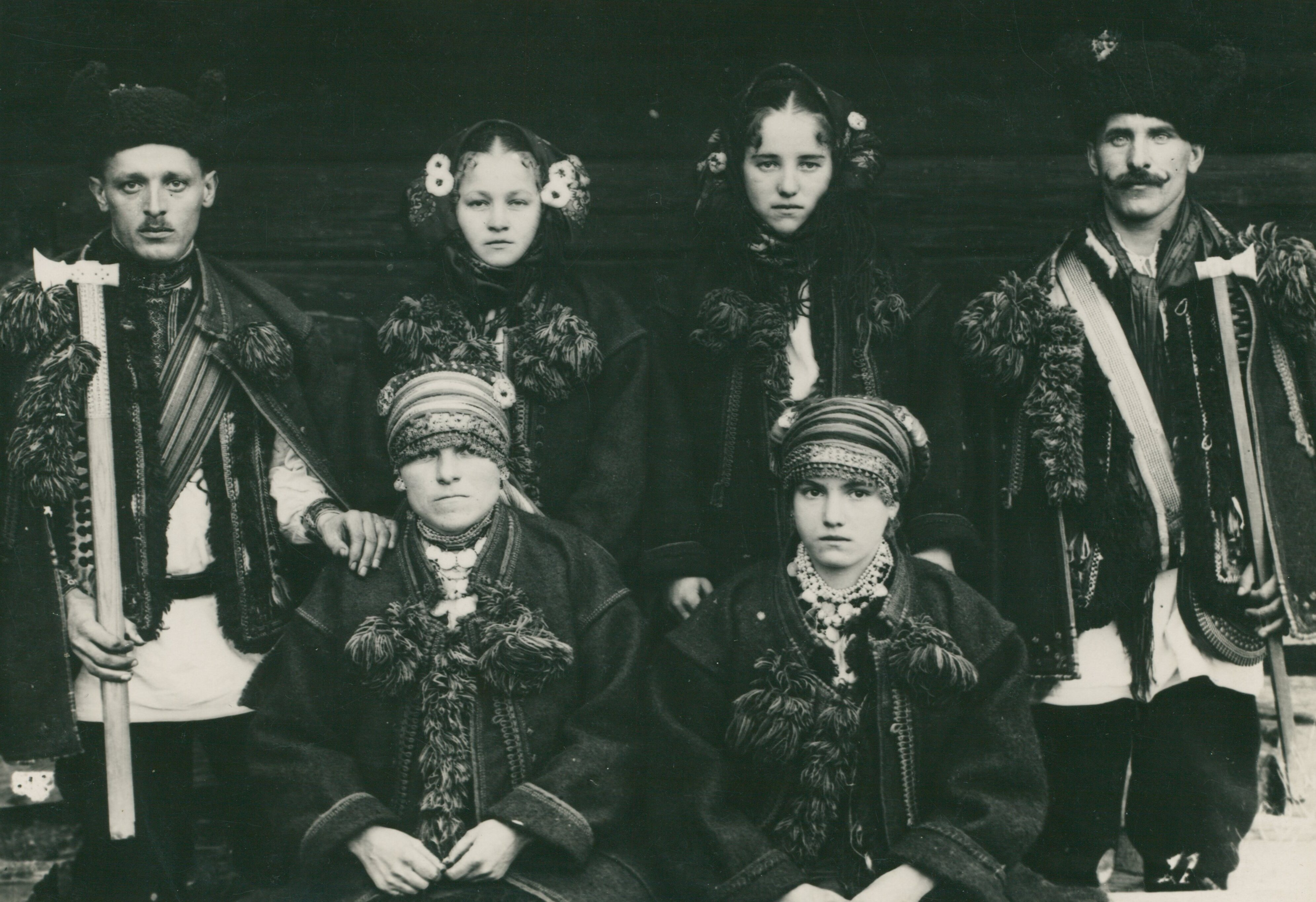
Hutsuls from Żabie, after 1932

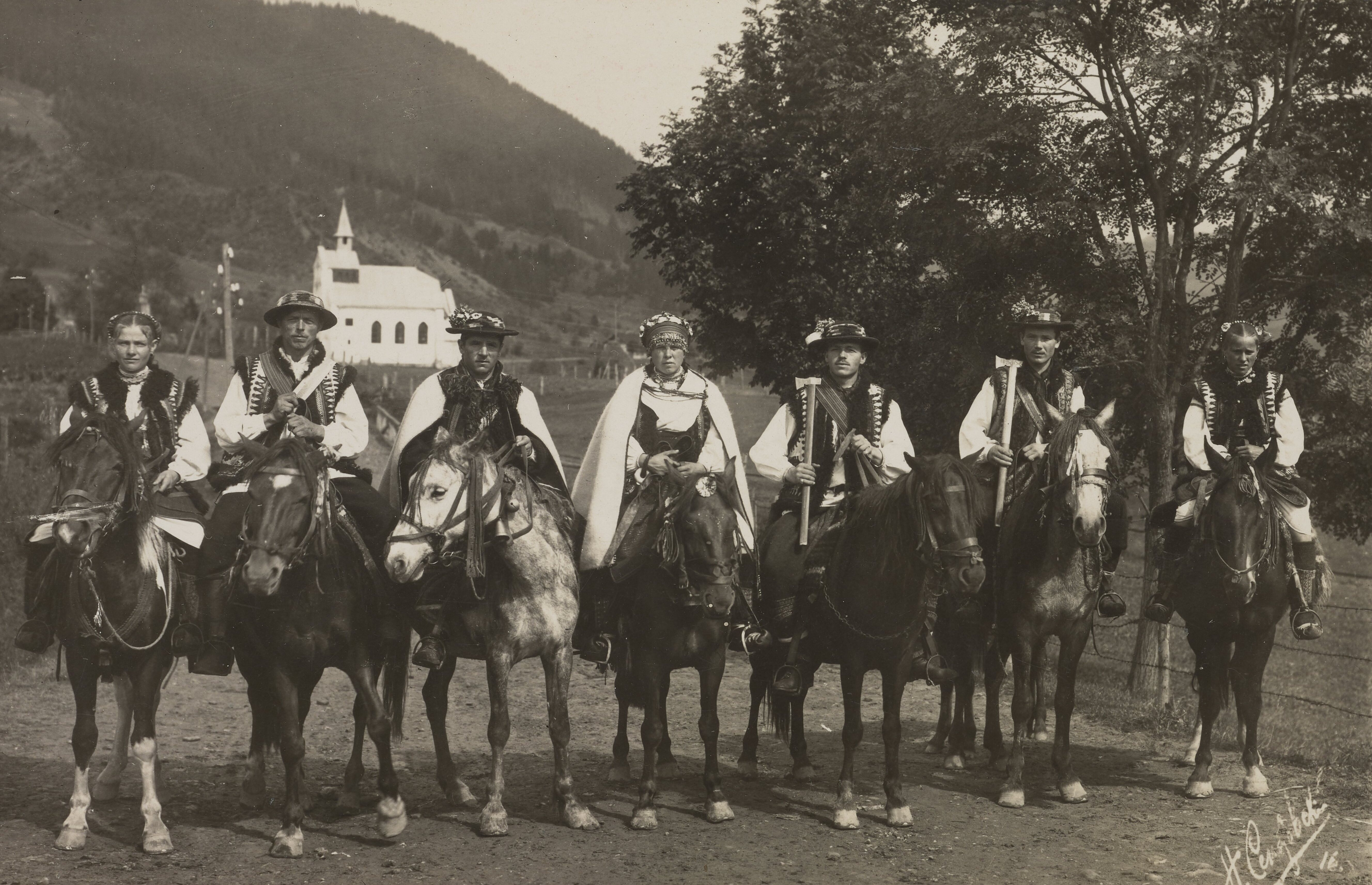
Hutsuls, before 1932

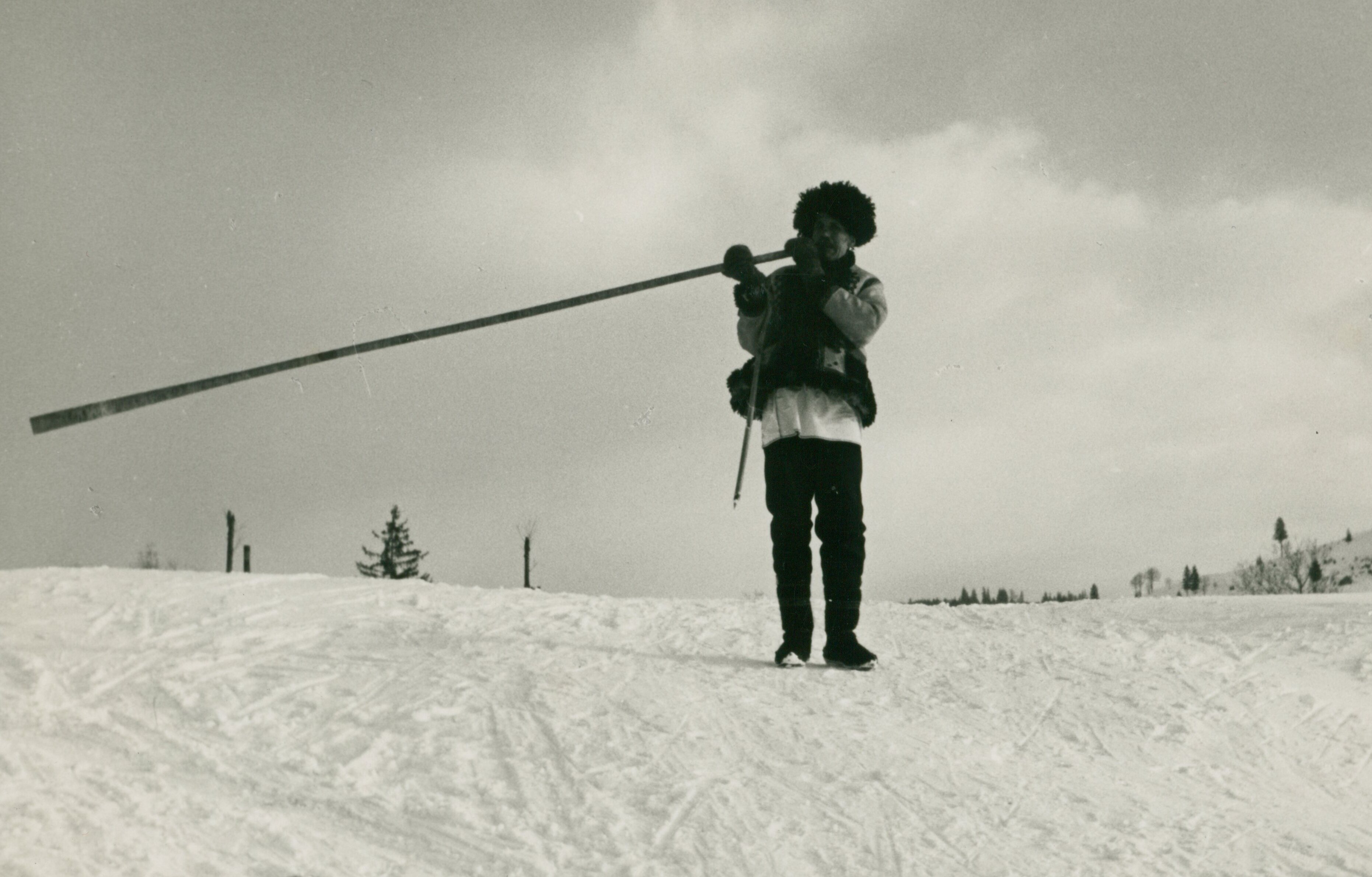
Hutsul Petro Chomyn playing the trembita

On June 12, 2020, Verkhovyna became the administrative center of the Verkhovyna settlement hromada.

Until 26 January 2024, Verkhovyna was designated urban-type settlement. On this day, a new law entered into force which abolished this status, and Verkhovyna became a rural settlement.

== Gallery ==
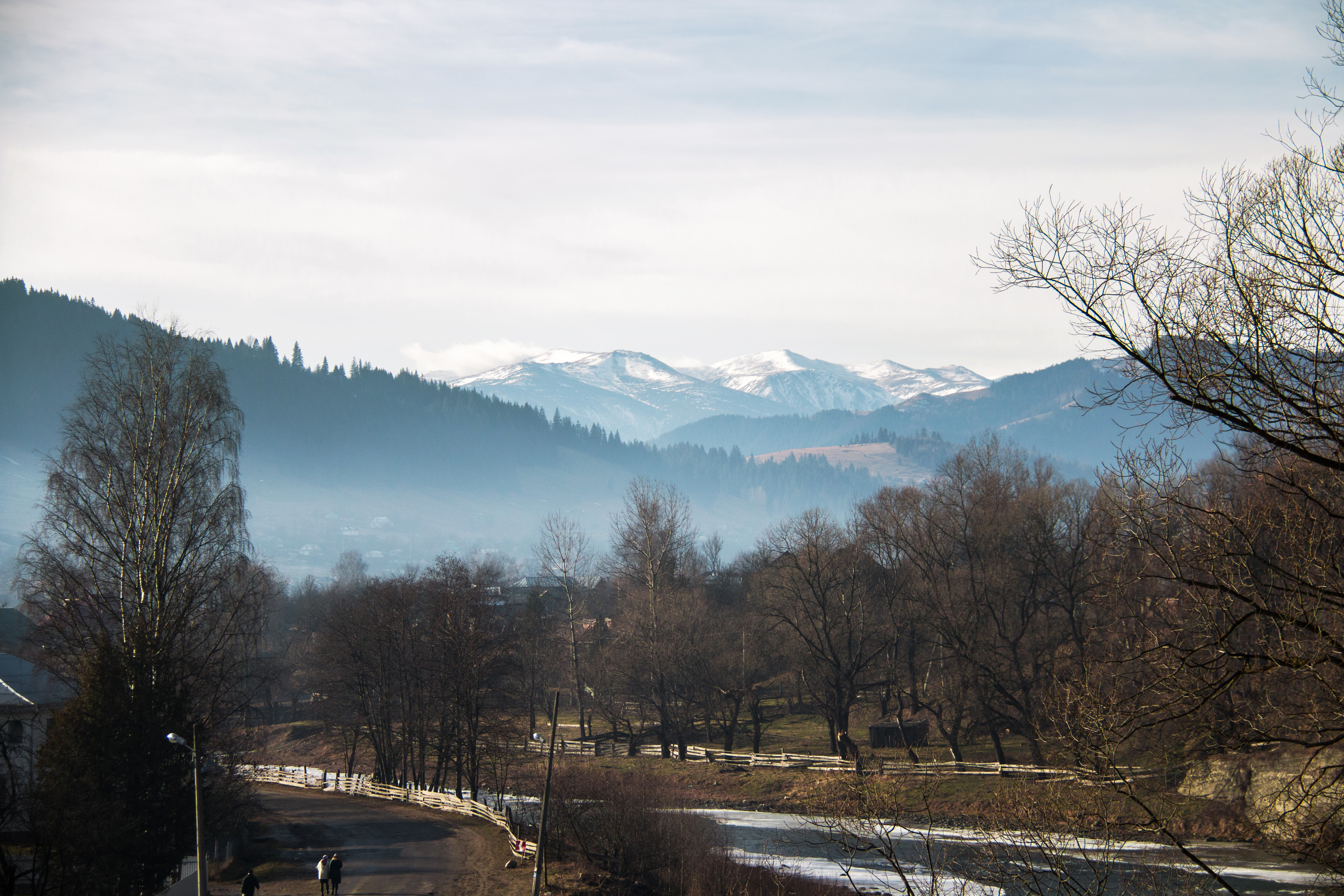
Carpathians in Verkhovyna

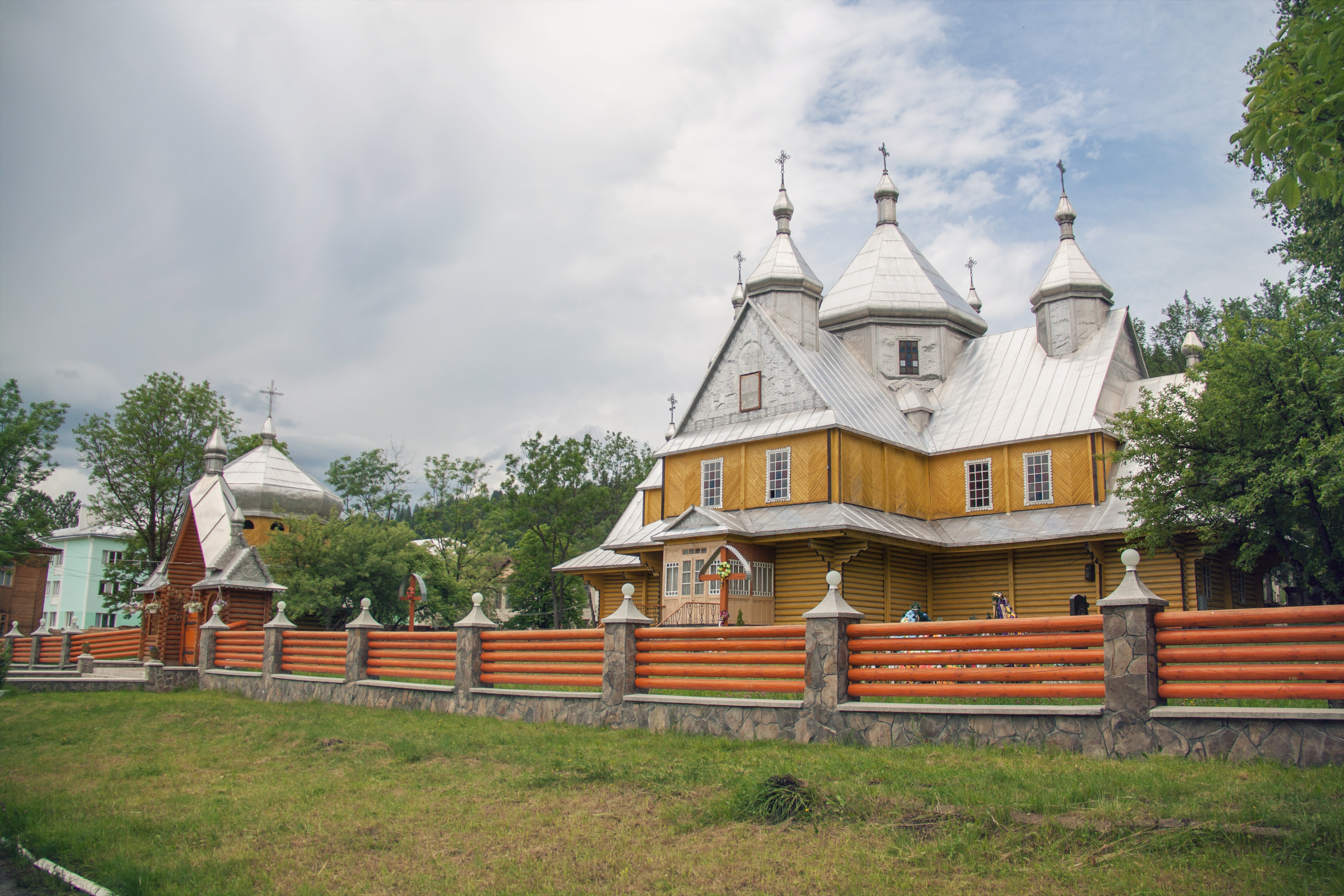
Church in Verkhovyna

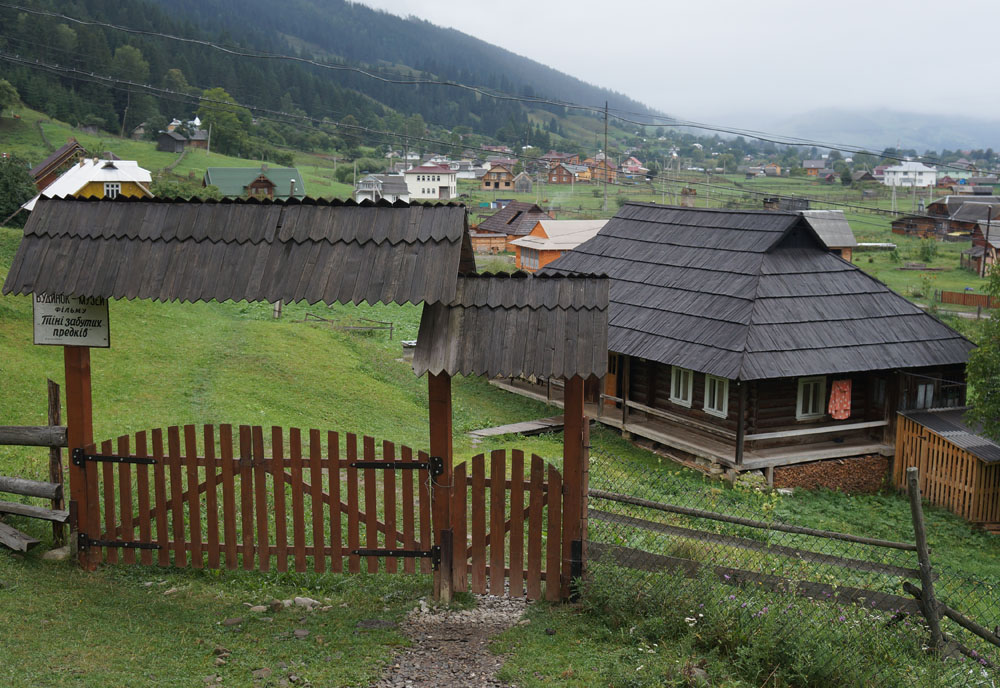
Film museum

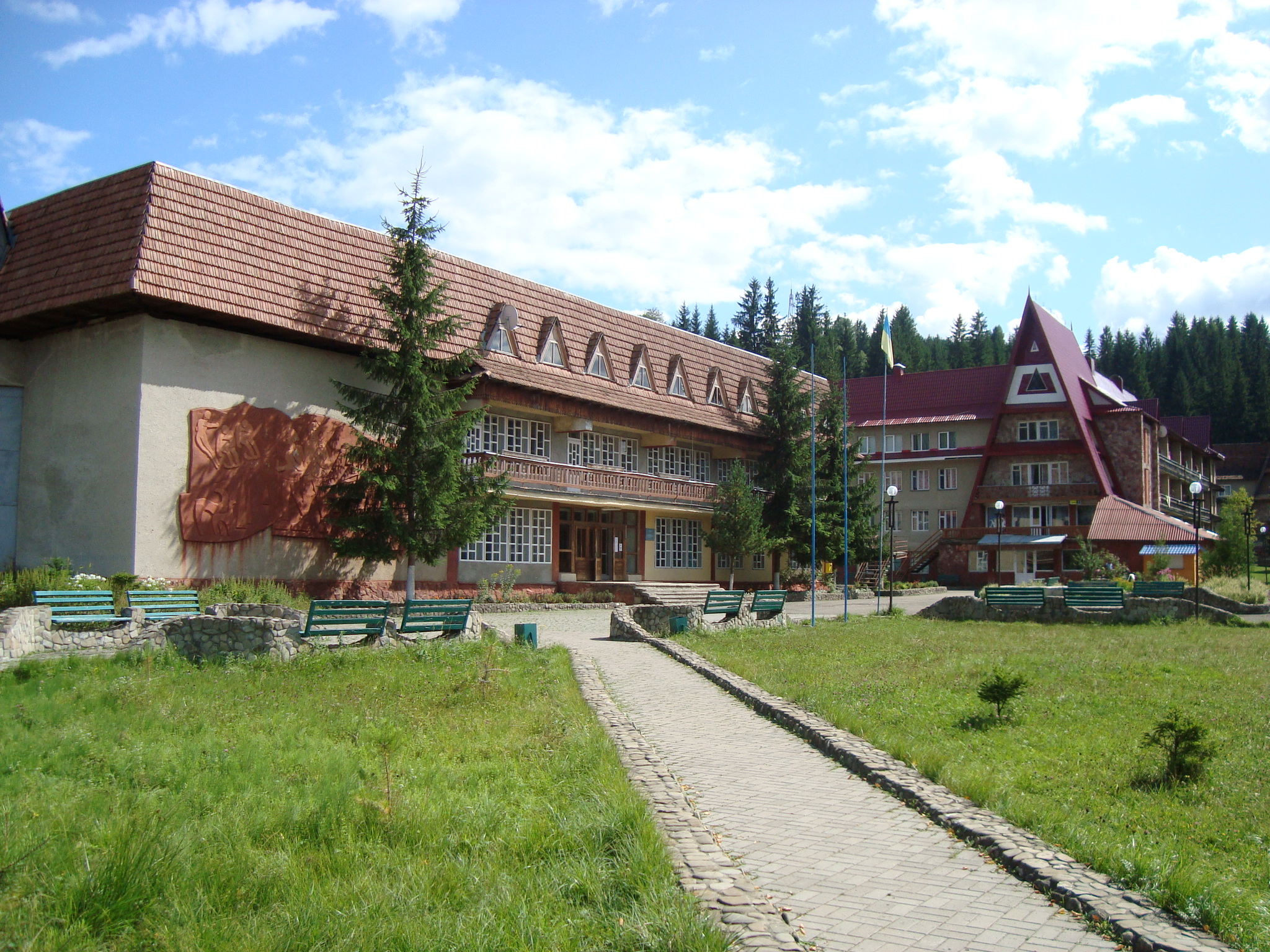
Sanatoria in Verkhovyna

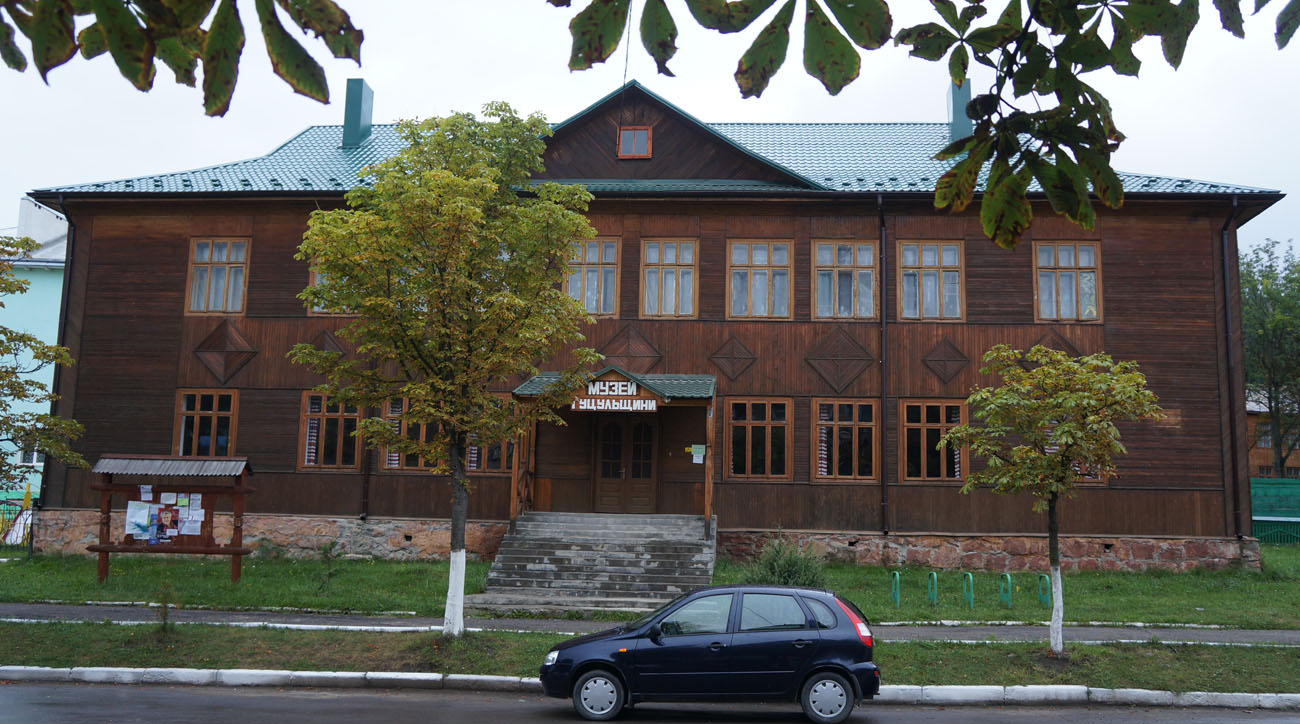
Hutsul museum

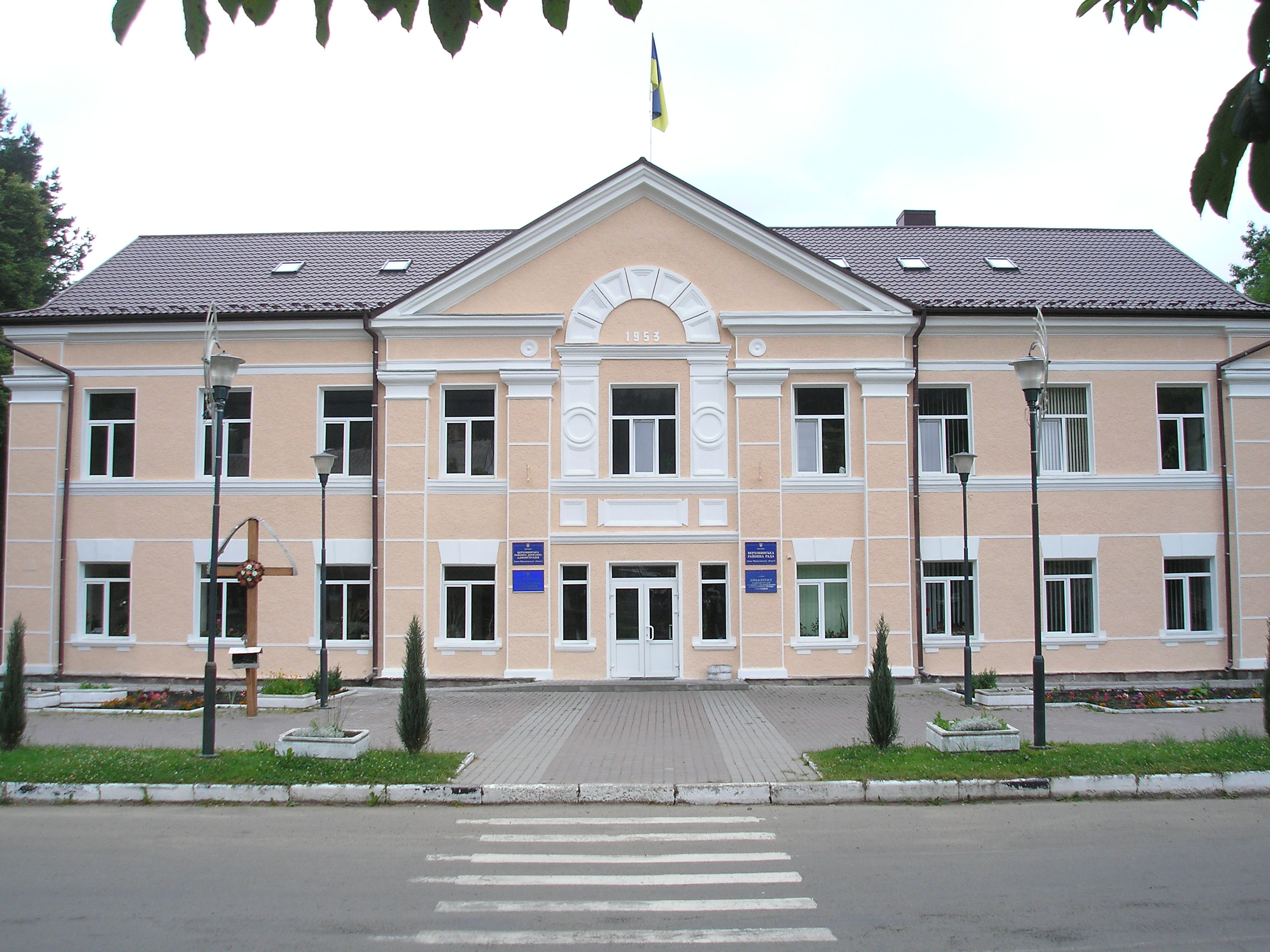
Verkhovyna district council

== Climate ==
The climate in Verkhovyna is a mild to warm summer subtype (Köppen: Dfb) of the humid continental climate.

Climate data for Verkhovyna
Month	Jan	Feb	Mar	Apr	May	Jun	Jul	Aug	Sep	Oct	Nov	Dec	Year
Daily mean °C (°F)	−5.1 (22.8)	−3.2 (26.2)	1.3 (34.3)	7.4 (45.3)	12.5 (54.5)	15.5 (59.9)	16.9 (62.4)	16.6 (61.9)	12.9 (55.2)	7.6 (45.7)	2.2 (36.0)	−2.4 (27.7)	6.9 (44.4)
Average precipitation mm (inches)	38 (1.5)	36 (1.4)	38 (1.5)	60 (2.4)	88 (3.5)	109 (4.3)	104 (4.1)	81 (3.2)	54 (2.1)	41 (1.6)	42 (1.7)	46 (1.8)	737 (29.1)
Source: Climate-Data.org
