= Verkhovyna Raion =

Subdivision of Ivano-Frankivsk Oblast, Ukraine

Verkhovyna Raion Верховинський район
- Raion
- Verkhovynskyi raion
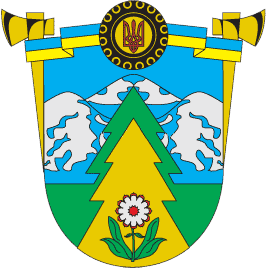
- Coat of arms

- Coordinates: 48°1′51″N 24°48′6″E
- Country: Ukraine
- Oblast: Ivano-Frankivsk Oblast
- Established: 1966
- Admin. center: Verkhovyna
- Subdivisions: 3 hromadas

Government
  - Governor: Vasyl Hondurak

Area
  - Total: 1,254 km^{2} (484 sq mi)

Population (2022)
  - Total: 30,195
  - Density: 24.08/km^{2} (62.36/sq mi)
- Time zone: UTC+02:00 (EET)
  - Summer (DST): UTC+03:00 (EEST)
- Postal index: 285280
- Area code: ?
- Website: Raion Profile (Verkhovna Rada); Raion Administration

Verkhovyna Raion (Ukrainian: Верховинський район, romanized: Verxovyns'kyj rajon) is a raion (district) of Ivano-Frankivsk Oblast (region). The rural settlement of Verkhovyna is the administrative center of the raion. The raion was reinstated in 1966 (initially in 1939 as Zhabie Raion) out of the Kosiv Raion. Population: 30,195 (2022 estimate).

== Subdivisions ==
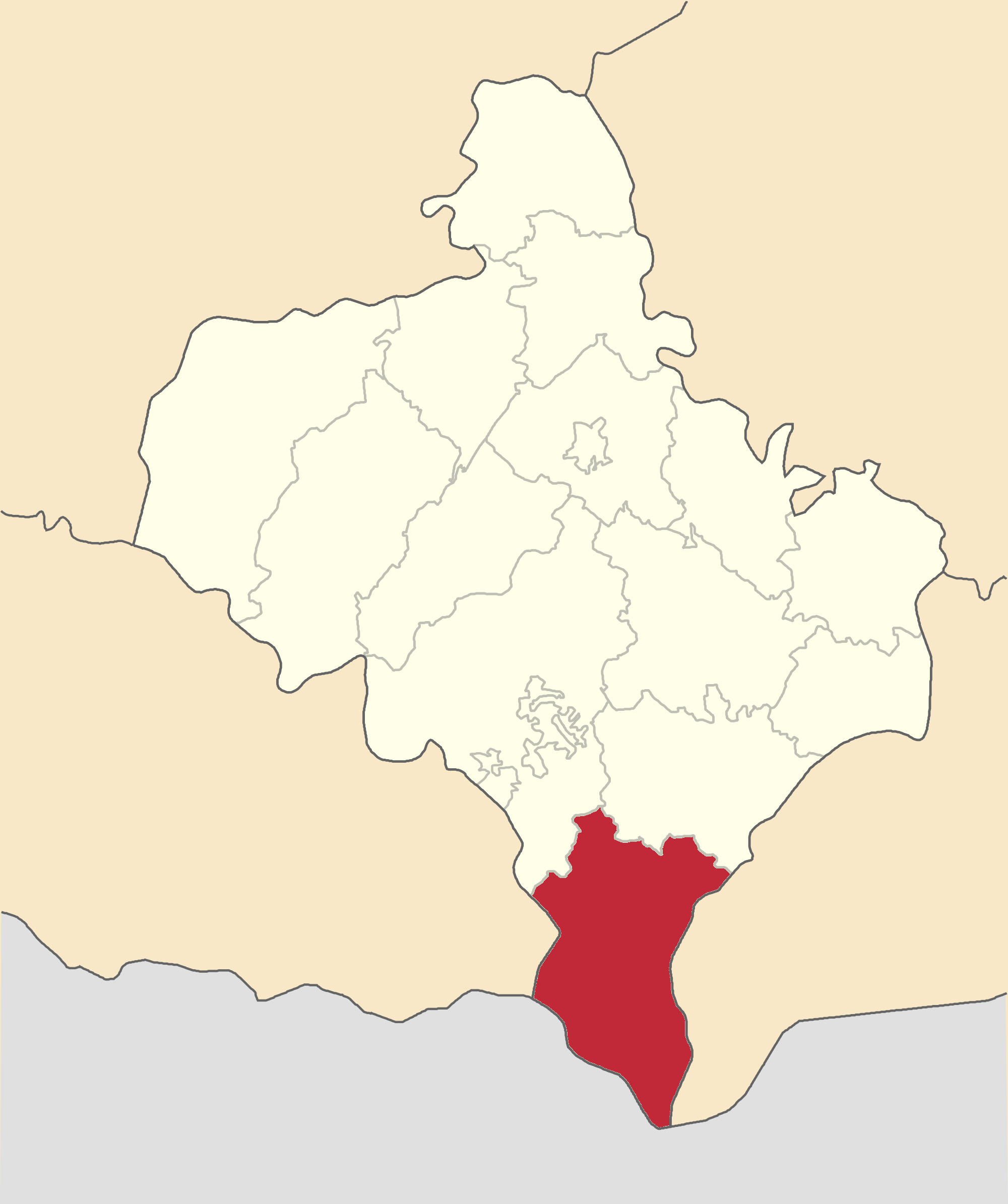
Verkhovyna Raion in Ivano-Frankivsk Oblast (1966-2020)

On 18 July 2020, as part of the administrative reform of Ukraine, the number of raions of Ivano-Frankivsk Oblast was reduced to six, however, the area of Verkhovyna Raion was essentially unchanged. The January 2020 estimate of the raion population was 30,479 (2020 est.)

Both before and after 2020, the raion consisted of three hromadas:

- Biloberizka rural hromada with the administration in the selo of Biloberizka;
- Verkhovyna settlement hromada with the administration in the rural settlement of Verkhovyna;
- Zelene rural hromada with the administration in the selo of Zelene.

== Geography ==
To the west of Verkhovyna Raion lies Zakarpattia Region, while to its east - Chernivtsi Region. To the northwest there lies the Nadvirna Raion and to the northeast - the Kosiv Raion. The biggest river, Cheremosh runs along the Chernivtsi Region and serves as the natural border. Most of the raion is covered with forest.

The raion is located at the extreme south of the Ivano-Frankivsk Region and has a 45 kilometres (28 mi) state border with Romania along the Chyvchyn Ridge. Infrastructure in the raion is underdeveloped and it does not have rail or air connection due to its highland relief. On the other hand it is widely used for mountain tourism and hiking.

Among notable landmarks there is a regional museum of local history "Hutsulshchyna", abandoned Polish Astronomical Observatory Biały Słoń which is used for as a mountain shelter with a small search and rescue team.

The raion is divided into one urban hromada and 21 rural hromadas. It lies in the historical region of Pokuttia.

== List of communes ==
- Verkhovyna (rural settlement)
  - Vipche (village)
- Bystrets
  - Dzembronia
- Biloberizka
- Bukovets
  - Cheretiv
- Verkhnii Yaseniv
  - Rivnia
- Holovy
  - Chorna Richka
- Holoshyna
- Hrynyava
  - Bila Richka
- Dovhopole
  - Kok Han
  - Polianky
- Zamahora
- Zelene
  - Burkut
  - Topilche
  - Yavirnyk
- Iltsi
  - Velykyi Khodak
- Krasnyk
- Krasnoyillia
  - Vyhoda
- Kryvopillia
  - Volova
  - Stayishche
- Kryvorivnia
  - Berezhnytsia
- Perekhresne
- Probiinivka
  - Hramotne
    - Stovpni
- Stebni
- Usteriky
- Khorotseve
  - Barvinkiv
- Yablunytsia
  - Senkivske
  - Cheremoshna
