= Ivan Hoyiv =

Ukrainian cultural, civic, and church figure (1860–1950)

- Іван Григорович Гоїв
- Born: 1860; Kurovychi, Austrian Empire
- Died: 1950 (aged 89–90); Sniatyn, Ukrainian SSR, Soviet Union
- Occupations: Choral conductor, cantor, civic activist, cooperative financier
- Spouse: Anna Zakharkevych (m. 1887)
- Children: 8, including Yulian Hoyiv, Yevhen, Omelian Hoyiv, and Zenon

Ivan Hryhorovych Hoyiv (Ukrainian: Іван Григорович Гоїв; 1860–1950) was a Ukrainian civic, cultural, and church figure in Pokuttia, a choral conductor, music educator, and longtime cantor (diak) at the Church of the Miracle of Saint Archangel Michael in Sniatyn. A disciple of Reverend Teofil Kobrynskyi, he co-founded local branches of the Boian choral society (1900), the Prosvita society (1909), and the Catholic reading room "Skala" (1930s), while also playing a prominent role in the Ukrainian credit and insurance cooperative movement in the Sniatyn region.

== Early life ==
Ivan Hoyiv was born in 1860 in the town of Kurovychi, Przemyślany County, Kingdom of Galicia and Lodomeria (now in Lviv Oblast, Ukraine), into the Greek Catholic family of Hryhorii and Yevdokiia Hoyiv. In the late 1870s, following his father's death, he was forced to leave his studies at the Lviv Theological Seminary of the Holy Spirit and chose a secular path instead. In 1880, at the invitation of local parish priest Rev. Teofil Kobrynskyi, Hoyiv relocated to Sniatyn.

== Church and cooperative career ==
In 1880, Hoyiv served as an assistant cantor at a newly established cantors' school in Sniatyn, mastering musical notation and the violin while studying choral conducting under Rev. Kobrynskyi. By Easter 1881, his choir was singing the entire Divine Liturgy. Following Kobrynskyi's death in March 1882, Hoyiv independently led the cantors' training course for singers from surrounding Pokuttian villages and served for decades as cantor at Sniatyn's Church of the Miracle of Saint Archangel Michael.

In 1887, Hoyiv married Anna Zakharkevych, the daughter of Sniatyn surveyor and village headman Semen Zakharkevych. The couple had eight children, six of whom survived to adulthood. (Note: Daughters Yevheniia and Klaudiia died in early 1894, shortly before the birth of their brother Yulian.) Hoyiv raised his children in a patriotic spirit; his sons later served as officers and soldiers in the Ukrainian Sich Riflemen, the Ukrainian Galician Army, and the 14th SS Galician Division.

Alongside his church duties, Hoyiv was active in Ukrainian financial cooperatives. For forty years, he represented the Lviv-based Dnister Mutual Insurance Society in Sniatyn, insuring local properties and channeling credit union deposits to support local cultural institutions. Prior to World War I, he also served as cashier and board member of the "Prut" County Savings and Loan Society, managing funds that financed the operation of the Ukrainian Student Dormitory (bursa) in Sniatyn.

== Cultural and civic activism ==
On 2 September 1890, Hoyiv became conductor of the burghers' choir at the Ruthenian Burghers' Reading Room in Sniatyn, and in November 1890 he was elected head of the mutual aid fund for cantors of the Ukrainian Catholic Eparchy of Stanislaviv. To prepare sheet music for his ensembles, he collaborated closely with Sen Horuk, who later became a prominent commander in the Ukrainian Sich Riflemen. Hoyiv's home in Sniatyn frequently hosted prominent Ukrainian writers and cultural figures, including Vasyl Stefanyk, Olha Kobylianska, Nataliya Kobrynska, and Petro Franko.

In 1900, Hoyiv was among the co-founders of the Sniatyn branch of the Boian musical and choral society. On 17 December 1903, he conducted the Sniatyn Boian choir in Chernivtsi at a jubilee concert honoring the 35th anniversary of composer Mykola Lysenko's creative career. Impressed by the performance, Lysenko presented Hoyiv with an autographed manuscript of his song "Oi ziidy, ziidy, yasen misiatsiu" (now preserved in the Ivano-Frankivsk Regional Museum). In 1909, Hoyiv also co-founded the Sniatyn reading room of the Prosvita society.

== Later years and death ==
In the mid-1920s, Hoyiv conducted a choir affiliated with the Ridna Shkola society in the Sniatyn suburb of Mykulyntsi, where graphic artist Vasyl Kasiyan's sister Olena sang. In the 1930s, he co-founded and served as deputy head of the parish reading room of the Catholic society "Skala" in Sniatyn.

During the Soviet era, Hoyiv's family suffered severe Stalinist repressions: his eldest son Yulian was executed by the NKVD in Kharkiv in December 1937, while his son Omelian spent years in Gulag camps and exile in Kazakhstan and Siberia until 1955. In February 1942, during the German occupation, Hoyiv published a newspaper notice in Lvivski Visti seeking any news of his missing sons, learning of their fate only after 1945. Hoyiv died in Sniatyn in 1950 and was buried in the local municipal cemetery.

== Sources ==
- Bazali, Ya. (1972). Svidoma Rodyna (u dvadtsiatylittia smerti Ivana Goiva) (in Ukrainian). Detroit. pp. 18–20.
- Bazhanskyi, Mykhailo (1983). Tvorchyi dynamizm patriotyzmu moikh zemliakiv (in Ukrainian). Detroit.
- Bazhanskyi, Mykhailo (1984). Vichno zhytymut... Postati vid zarannia istorii, azh do nainovishykh chasiv: Biohrafichnyi slovnyk (in Ukrainian). Detroit. pp. 107–111.
- Boida, Andrii (2026). "Spivzasnovnyk Sniatynskykh chytalen Ivan Hoiv (1860–1950)". Korolenkivski chytannia 2025 (in Ukrainian). Kharkiv. pp. 363–367.
- Boida, Andrii (2026). "Rekonstruktsiia zhyttiepysu khorunzhoho UHA Omeliana Hoiva (1901–1989)". Pamiatkoznavchi studii doslidnykiv XXI st. (in Ukrainian). X. Kharkiv: Kursor: 363–371.
- "Dyrektsiia Povitovoho Tovarystva oshchadnostii i pozychok "PRUT" v Sniatyni". Dilo (in Ukrainian). No. 94. 1 May 1913. p. 8.
- Hoian, Yarema (2001). Prysviata: Ese (in Ukrainian). Kyiv: Veselka.
- Korolko, Andrii (2020). "Muzychno-khorove tovarystvo "Sniatynskyi Boian" na pochatku XX st.: stanovlennia i praktychna diialnist". Naukovyi visnyk Chernivetskoho universytetu imeni Yuriia Fedkovycha. Istoriia (in Ukrainian) (2 (52)): 62–72. doi:10.31861/hj2020.52.62-72.
