= Omelian Hoyiv =

Ukrainian military officer, forestry engineer, and civic activist (1901–1989)

- Омелян-Олександр Іванович Гоїв
- Born: 27 March 1901; Sniatyn, Kingdom of Galicia and Lodomeria, Cisleithania, Austria-Hungary
- Died: 7 May 1989 (aged 88); Kharkiv, Ukrainian SSR, Soviet Union
- Education: Czech Technical University in Prague
- Years active: 1916–1917, 1918–1919
- Spouse: Olena Bazylevska
- Children: Volodymyr
- Military career
- Allegiance: Austria-Hungary (1916–1917); West Ukrainian People's Republic (1918–1919)
- Branch: Ukrainian Sich Riflemen; Ukrainian Galician Army
- Rank: Rifleman (Strilets); Ensign (Khorunzhyi)
- Commands: Deputy platoon commander, 24th Kolomyia Rifle Regiment
- Conflicts: World War I * Eastern Front; Polish–Ukrainian War * Battle of Lviv * Chortkiv offensive
- Other work: Forestry engineer

Omelian-Oleksandr Ivanovych Hoyiv (Ukrainian: Омелян-Олександр Іванович Гоїв; 27 March 1901 – 7 May 1989) was a Ukrainian military officer, forestry engineer, and civic activist. He served as a rifleman in the Ukrainian Sich Riflemen (1916–1917) and an ensign (khorunzhyi) in the Ukrainian Galician Army (1918–1919) during the Polish–Ukrainian War. Following interwar emigration and engineering studies in Prague, he worked as a forestry engineer in Soviet Ukraine, where he became a victim of Stalinist repressions in 1941 before being rehabilitated in 1955.

== Early life and military service ==
Omelian-Oleksandr Hoyiv was born on 27 March 1901 in Sniatyn into the family of Ivan Hoyiv, a church cantor (diak) and prominent local cultural activist, and Anna Zakharkevych. He was one of eight children; his brothers Yulian, Yevhen, and Zenon also became active in Ukrainian military and national movements. Beginning in 1914, he studied intermittently at the Imperial-Royal Realschule in Sniatyn.

In 1916, at age 15, Hoyiv volunteered for the Ukrainian Sich Riflemen, serving in the 1st Regiment until 1917, including a period stationed in the rear in Gmünd due to his youth. Following the collapse of Austria-Hungary in November 1918, he joined the Ukrainian Galician Army at age 17. After completing officer training in Kolomyia, he was commissioned as an ensign (khorunzhyi) and assigned as deputy platoon commander in the 24th Kolomyia Rifle Regiment (named after Hetman Petro Doroshenko). He fought in the Battle of Lviv in early 1919 and was captured by Polish forces on 28 June 1919 during the Chortkiv offensive. Hoyiv was held in prisoner-of-war camps in Brest, Białystok, Wadowice, Kalisz, and Tuchola until his release on 5 November 1920.

== Education and interwar emigration ==
After recovering from typhus and wartime hardships, Hoyiv returned to Sniatyn and graduated from the local gymnasium in May 1921. On 22 September 1922, he crossed semi-legally into Vienna, where he briefly lived in difficult material conditions before relocating to Prague.

In Prague, Hoyiv enrolled at the Czech Technical University in Prague, earning a degree in forestry engineering in 1928. He participated actively in the Ukrainian student movement and the "Hromada" student society; in March 1923, alongside his brother Yevhen, he took part in Ukrainian political demonstrations in Prague protesting Polish rule in Galicia. During his student years, he was acquainted with graphic artist Vasyl Kasiyan and became an avid chess problem solver, having several of his solutions published in the German-language daily Prager Tagblatt in 1928.

== Life in Soviet Ukraine and repressions ==
In June 1928, Hoyiv moved to Kharkiv, then the capital of the Ukrainian Soviet Socialist Republic, where he worked in the forestry sector—initially in Huty and later as head forester in Sharivka (Bohodukhiv Raion). In Kharkiv, he married Olena Bazylevska, with whom he had a son, Volodymyr, in 1930.

On 23 June 1941, immediately following the German invasion of the Soviet Union, Hoyiv was arrested by the NKVD on charges of espionage, anti-Soviet activity, and ties to Ukrainian nationalists. On 2 May 1942, the Special Council of the NKVD sentenced him to ten years in Gulag corrective labor camps. Meanwhile, during the German occupation of Galicia in February 1942, his father published a notice in the newspaper Lvivski Visti seeking any information about his missing sons Yulian and Omelian in the Kharkiv region.

After completing his camp sentence in 1951, Hoyiv was sent into internal exile in Krasnoyarsk Krai. On 22 June 1955, the Supreme Court of the Soviet Union overturned his conviction and rehabilitated him for lack of corpus delicti. Following his rehabilitation, he settled in Pokotylivka near Kharkiv, where he lived until his death in Kharkiv on 7 May 1989.

== Sources ==
- Bazali, Ya. (1972). Svidoma Rodyna (u dvadtsiatylittia smerti Ivana Goiva) (in Ukrainian). Detroit. pp. 18–20.
- Bazhanskyi, Mykhailo (1984). Vichno zhytymut... Postati vid zarannia istorii, azh do nainovishykh chasiv: Biohrafichnyi slovnyk (in Ukrainian). Detroit. pp. 107–111.
- Boida, Andrii (2024). "Uchast Vasylia Poraika ta brativ Hoiviv v roboti sektsii Ukrainskoho Studentskoho Soiuzu v m. Sniatyn (1911–1921)". Halychyna (in Ukrainian) (37): 140–149.
- Boida, Andrii (2025). "Rodyna Hoiviv u suspilno-politychnykh protsesakh v Ukraini naprykintsi XIX – v pershii polovyni XX st.". Volodymyr Hrabovetskyi – istoryk Ukrainy: kolektyvna monohrafiia (in Ukrainian). Ivano-Frankivsk: Vasyl Stefanyk Precarpathian National University. pp. 196–208.
- Boida, Andrii (2026). "Rekonstruktsiia zhyttiepysu khorunzhoho UHA Omeliana Hoiva (1901–1989)". Pamiatkoznavchi studii doslidnykiv XXI st. (in Ukrainian). X. Kharkiv: Kursor: 363–371.
- "Khto znav by shchos pro Yuliana i Omeliana Hoiva". Lvivski visti (in Ukrainian). No. 28. 1942. p. 4.
- "Richtige Lösungen des Problems Nr. 1487". Prager Tagblatt (in German). No. 13. 15 January 1928. p. 21.
- "Richtige Lösungen des Problems Nr. 1491". Prager Tagblatt (in German). No. 37. 12 February 1928. p. 22.
- "Richtige Lösungen des Problems Nr. 1504". Prager Tagblatt (in German). No. 113. 12 May 1928. p. 22.
- Sribniak, Ihor (2016). Entsyklopediia polonu: ukrainska Tuchola (in Ukrainian). Vol. 1 (2nd ed.). Kyiv; Paris.
