= Muha Rebellion =

Revolt in Galicia, 1490 to 1492

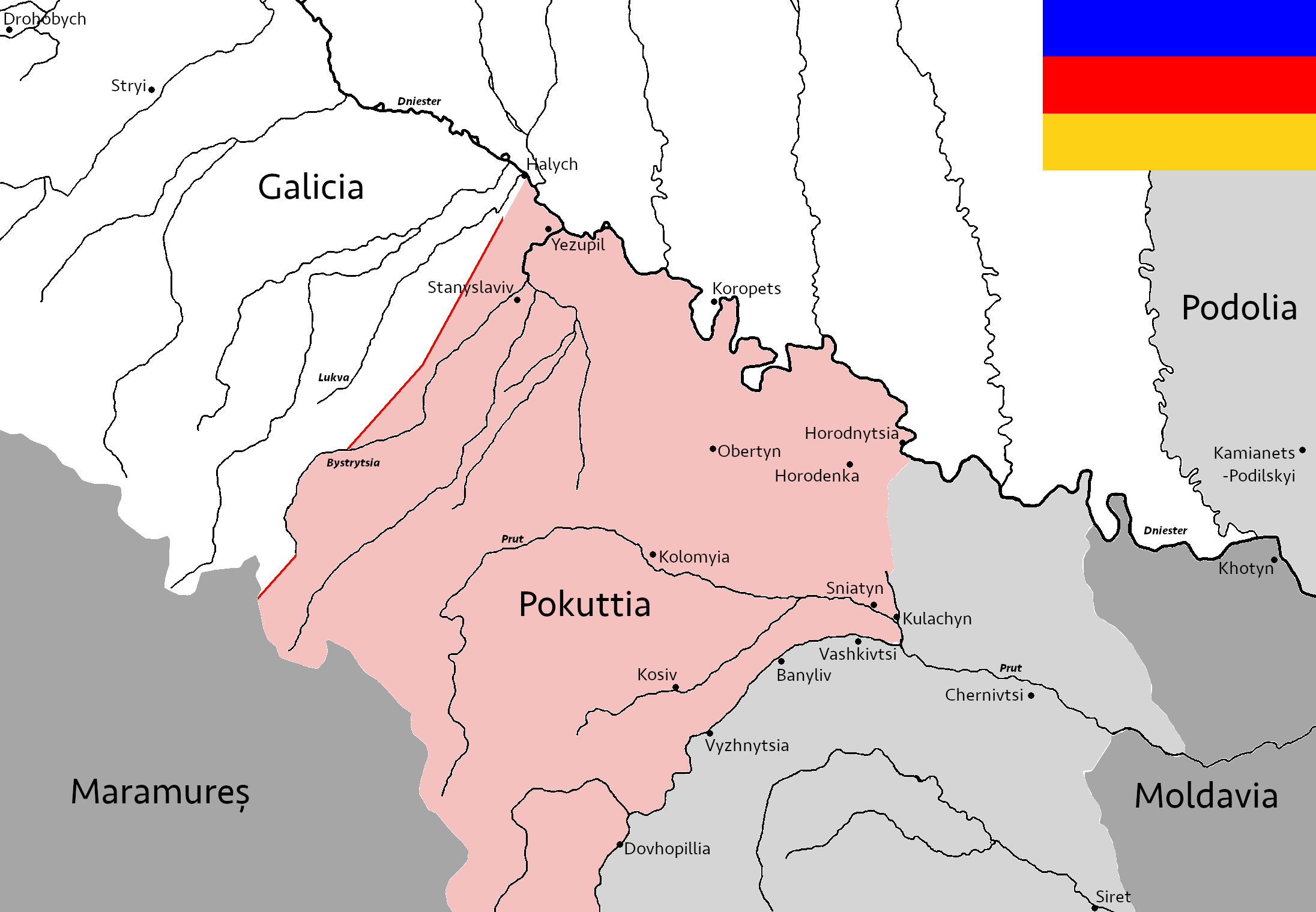
- Map of the historial region of Pokuttia in modern-day Ukraine
Date	1490 – 1492
Location	Galicia
Result	Polish victory
Territorial changes	Rebellion suppressed; Moldavian occupation of Pokuttia

Belligerents
Kingdom of Poland	Muha's army Moldavia (1490)

Commanders and leaders
Casimir IV	Petru Muha † Stephen III (1490)

Strength
Unknown	Total: 10,000 rebels

Casualties and losses
Unknown	Nearly entire rebel army destroyed

The Muha Rebellion started in 1490 in Galicia, and was led by Petru Muha. Its purpose was overthrowing Polish control of Galicia.

Muha started the revolt in Pokuttia in 1490. It quickly spread to neighboring territories, across nearly all southeastern Galicia. Muha marched to Lviv with a rebel army of 10,000 people. Moldavian Voivode Stephen the Great supported the rebellion. Stephen used the instability in Poland as an opportunity to reconquer Pokuttia in summer of 1490, over which the Principality of Moldavia and the Kingdom of Poland had a dispute since late 14th century.

The rebel army was composed of both Ukrainian and Moldavian peasants from places like Bukovina. In the army there were also Orthodox petty gentry noblemen originally from Pokuttia, as well as burghers (mischany / mistychi).

The ten-thousand-man army led by Muha conquered the fortified cities of Kolomyia, Sniatyn, and Halych, killing a considerable number of enemy noblemen and burghers as they went.

As the army was advancing to Lviv, it was blocked by a combined force of Polish Royal Army soldiers, a levée en masse of Galician magnates, and Prussian mercenaries. At the Battle of Rohatyn, near Rohatyn, present-day Ivano-Frankivsk Oblast, the army suffered a crushing defeat and most of the rebels were killed. However, Muha survived, and fled back to Moldavia with the other survivors.

Muha returned to Galicia in 1492, in an unsuccessful attempt to stir up another rebellion. He was captured in the area of Kolomyia, and reportedly died in a prison in Kraków.
