= Petru Muha =

Polish-wallachian rebel and military leader (fl. 1490)

- Born: 15th century
- Died: c. 1492; Kraków, Kingdom of Poland
- Military career
- Allegiance: Ukrainian and Moldavian peasants
- Rank: commander
- Conflicts: Muha Rebellion

Petru Muha (fl. 1490) was a Wallachian rebel and military leader, best known as the leader of the eponymous Muha Rebellion against Polish magnates and noblemen in Galicia started with Moldavian support. This uprising was one of the largest of the 15th and 16th century in the area, together with Severyn Nalyvaiko's. This rebellion was mentioned by Jan of Targowisk:

A certail [Muha] from Wallachia [generic exonym for the territories populated by Romanians at that time, in fact it referred to Moldavia], in a short time he had gathered 9,000 soldiers from the peasants and entered Poland, where Sniatyn is located, attacked and conquered it, then he attacked other cities and villages, after which he conquered Halych, Kolomyia and Rohatyn

== Biography ==
Between 1490 and 1492 he led an army of 10,000 people, both Ukrainians and Moldavians, as well as some other people and Orthodox petty nobles, in an attempt to overthrow the Polish in Galicia. Muha had support from Stephen the Great, the Moldavian voivode of the time. The revolt erupted in Pokuttia, quickly spreading to other parts of Galicia. The rebellious army proceeded through the territory, taking the cities of Halych, Sniatyn, and Kolomyia.

Muha and his army were blocked by a combined force of the Polish Royal army, a levée en masse summoned by Galician noblemen, and Prussian mercenaries. Many of the rebellious army's warriors died in the Battle of Rohatyn, near Rohatyn. Muha and the survivors fled back to Moldavia. They returned to Galicia in 1492, in an attempt to stir up another rebellion.

Muha was captured near Kolomyia, and died in the dungeons of a prison in Kraków.

== In popular culture ==
Volodymyr Hrabovetsky wrote a book about Muha's rebellion, which was published in Kyiv in 1979.
