= Gustav Baar =

Soviet military intelligence officer (1892–1938)

- Gustavs Bārs
- Born: 27 June 1892; Schlock, Riga County, Governorate of Livonia, Russian Empire
- Died: 3 October 1938 (aged 46); Kommunarka shooting ground, Moscow Oblast, Russian SFSR, Soviet Union
- Resting place: Kommunarka shooting ground
- Education: Frunze Military Academy
- Military career
- Allegiance: Russian Empire (1915–1917); Soviet Union (1918–1938)
- Branch: Imperial Russian Army; Red Army
- Rank: Colonel (Red Army)
- Commands: Intelligence Department of the Kharkiv Military District (1921–1922); Intelligence Department of the Ukrainian Military District (1923–1933)
- Conflicts: World War I Russian Civil War

Gustav-Avgust Ivanovich Baar (Latvian: Gustavs Bārs; Russian: Густав-Август Иванович Баар; 27 June 1892 – 3 October 1938) was a Soviet military intelligence officer and colonel in the Red Army. He headed the intelligence departments of the Kharkiv Military District (1921–1922) and the Ukrainian Military District (1923–1933) before being executed during the Great Purge.

== Biography ==
=== Early life and military service ===
Baar was born on 27 June 1892 into a working-class Latvian family in Schlock (now Sloka, part of Jūrmala), Governorate of Livonia. After completing three grades of municipal school in 1909, he worked as a farmhand, laborer, and riverboat sailor.

Drafted into the Imperial Russian Army in September 1915, Baar trained with the 178th Reserve Infantry Battalion and served in a mounted demolition and reconnaissance unit in 1916, rising to junior non-commissioned officer. He joined the Russian Social Democratic Labour Party (Bolsheviks) in May 1917 and volunteered for the Red Army in 1918, serving initially in the 7th Latvian Rifle Regiment and in military recruitment offices in Novgorod Governorate.

From December 1918 to May 1919, Baar served as deputy chairman of the Valka county executive committee in the Latvian Socialist Soviet Republic. He subsequently worked in Red Army intelligence as an agent-operations representative of the Revolutionary Military Council of the 15th Army (May 1919 – June 1920) and chief of the registration department of the 4th Army (June 1920 – February 1921).

=== Intelligence career in Soviet Ukraine ===
In 1921, Baar headed the Romanian desk of the intelligence department of the Armed Forces of Ukraine and Crimea and completed two-month intelligence courses in Moscow. He served as head of the intelligence department of the Kharkiv Military District from October 1921 to July 1922, then led Border Intelligence Post No. 3 until May 1923.

From May 1923 to November 1933, Baar directed the intelligence department of the Ukrainian Military District in Kharkiv, where former Ukrainian Galician Army officer Yulian Hoyiv served as his deputy (1924–1925 and 1927–1930) and oversaw analytical work on Romania. Baar graduated from senior command refresher courses at the Frunze Military Academy in 1926 and from its special faculty in 1935.

Between 1929 and 1932, under the Fourth (Intelligence) Directorate of the Red Army General Staff and district commander Iona Yakir, Baar organized a network of clandestine partisan and sabotage schools in Kharkiv, Kupiansk, Kyiv, and Odesa—recruiting demolition specialist Ilya Starinov as an instructor in February 1930—and supervised the preparation of over 3,000 partisan cadres and hidden supply caches in the Ukrainian SSR before the program was curtailed by central authorities. Promoted to colonel on 17 January 1936, Baar remained at the disposal of the Red Army Intelligence Directorate from December 1935 to January 1938.

=== Arrest and execution ===
Following the arrest and execution of his former deputy Yulian Hoyiv in December 1937, NKVD interrogators obtained testimonies from arrested officers accusing Baar of spying for Poland since 1930. Baar was arrested in Kharkiv on 27 January 1938 and transferred to Moscow. On 3 October 1938, the Military Collegium of the Supreme Court of the Soviet Union sentenced him to death for participating in a counter-revolutionary terrorist organization; he was shot the same day at the Kommunarka shooting ground. He was posthumously rehabilitated by the Military Collegium on 25 June 1957.

== Works ==
- Baar, G. (1928). Kak i kakuyu voynu gotovyat imperialisty? [How and What Kind of War Are the Imperialists Preparing?] (in Russian). Kharkiv. 59 pp.

== Sources ==
- Alekseyev, M. A.; Kolpakidi, A. I.; Kochik, V. Ya. (2012). Entsiklopediya voyennoy razvedki. 1918–1945 gg (in Russian). Moscow: Kuchkovo pole. pp. 75–76, 236.
- Alekseyev, M. A.; Kolpakidi, A. I.; Kochik, V. Ya. (2020). Sovetskaya voyennaya razvedka 1917–1934 gg (in Russian). Moscow: Veche. p. 85.
- Boida, Andrii (2026). "Okremi storinky zhyttiepysu Hustava Baara (1892–1938)". Slobozhanski chytannia (in Ukrainian). Kharkiv. pp. 21–22.
- Diyenko, A. V. (2002). Razvedka i kontrrazvedka v litsakh (in Russian). Moscow: Russkiy mir. p. 33.
- Istoriya "latyshskikh strelkov". Ot pervykh marksistov do generalov KGB (in Russian). Moscow: Rodina. 2021. p. 37.
- Kolpakidi, A. I.; Prokhorov, D. P. (1999). Imperiya GRU. Ocherki istorii rossiyskoy voyennoy razvedki (in Russian). Moscow: OLMA-Press. pp. 64–65, 155–156.
- Linder, I. B.; Churkin, S. A. (2008). Spetsluzhby Rossii za 1000 let (in Russian). Moscow: Ripol Klassik. p. 435.
- Lurye, V. M.; Kochik, V. Ya. (2002). GRU: dela i lyudi (in Russian). Saint Petersburg; Moscow: Neva; OLMA-Press. pp. 137–138.
