= Roman Stepankov =

Ukrainian footballer (born 1989)

Personal information
- Full name: Roman Andriyovych Stepankov
- Date of birth: 1 January 1989 (age 37)
- Place of birth: Snyatyn, Ukraine
- Height: 1.88 m (6 ft 2 in)
- Position: Forward

Team information
- Current team: Nadwiślanka Nowe Brzesko
- Number: 6

Youth career
- 2002–2006: Bukovyna Chernivtsi

Senior career*
Years	Team	Apps	(Gls)
2006–2007	Bukovyna Chernivtsi	26	(1)
2007–2008	Obolon Kyiv	4	(0)
2007–2008	Obolon-2 Bucha	51	(2)
2009	Zakarpattia Uzhhorod	8	(1)
2009	Arsenal Bila Tserkva	2	(0)
2010–2012	Bukovyna Chernivtsi	55	(3)
2012–2013	Arsenal Bila Tserkva	21	(2)
2013	Zirka Kropyvnytskyi	7	(0)
2014	Bukovyna Chernivtsi	22	(3)
2015–2016	Puszcza Niepołomice	42	(8)
2017	Karpaty Krosno	16	(3)
2017–2021	GKS Drwinia	90	(40)
2021–2022	Sokół Kocmyrzów Baranówka	26	(3)
2022–2026	Dąb Zabierzów Bocheński	66	(37)
2026–	Nadwiślanka Nowe Brzesko	26	(3)
- * Club domestic league appearances and goals as of 18:15, 13 September 2026 (UTC)

Roman Andriyovych Stepankov (born 1 January 1989) is a Ukrainian footballer who plays as a forward for Polish club Nadwiślanka Nowe Brzesko.

== Honours ==
GKS Drwinia

- Polish Cup (Lesser Poland regionals): 2017–18
- Polish Cup (Tarnów regionals): 2017–18
- Polish Cup (Tarnów-Bochnia regionals): 2017–18, 2018–19, 2019–20
