= Pokuttia =

Historical region in Ukraine

Pokuttia Покуття (Ukrainian) Pokucie (Polish) Pocuția (Romanian)
- Historical region of Central Europe
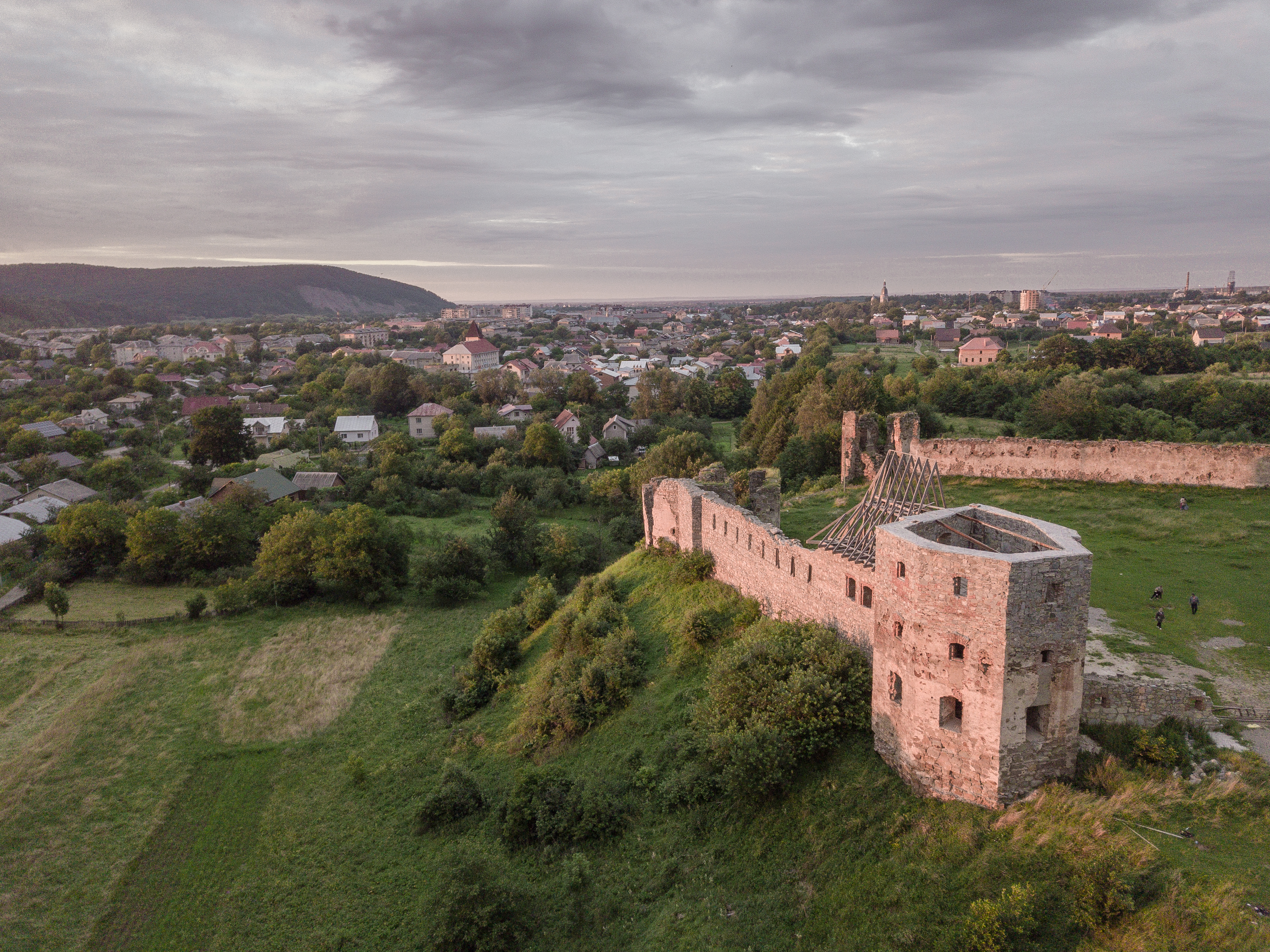
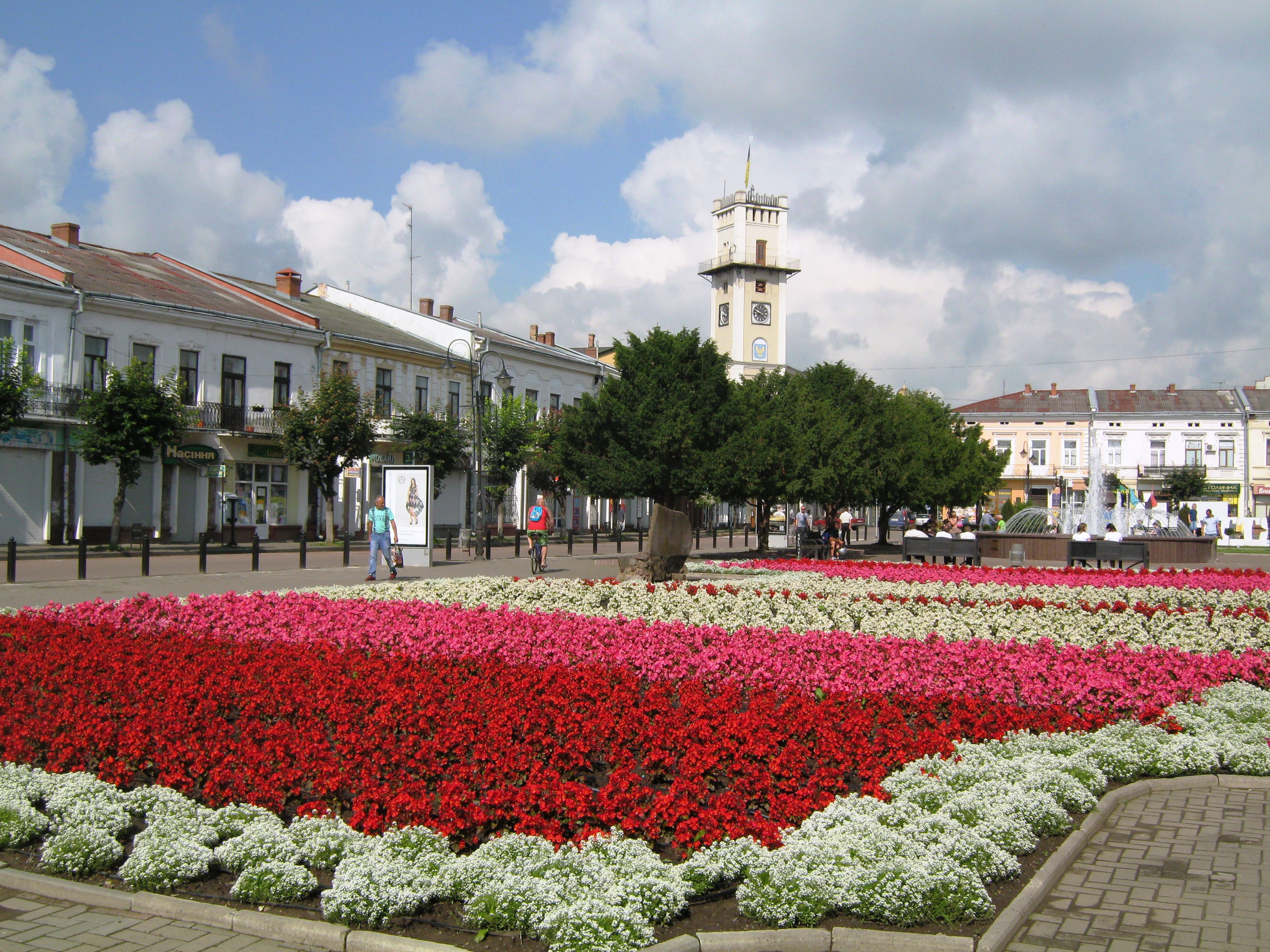
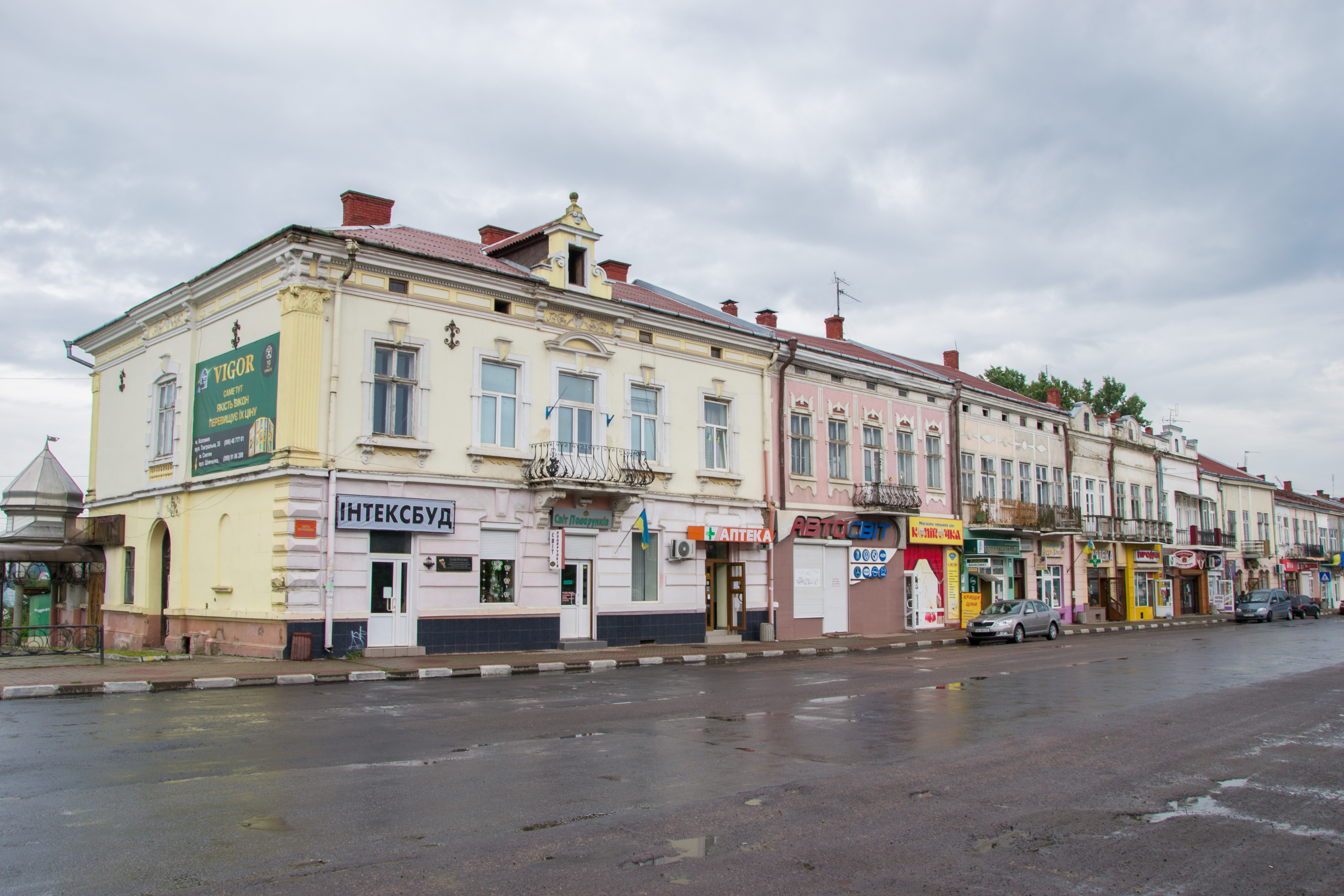
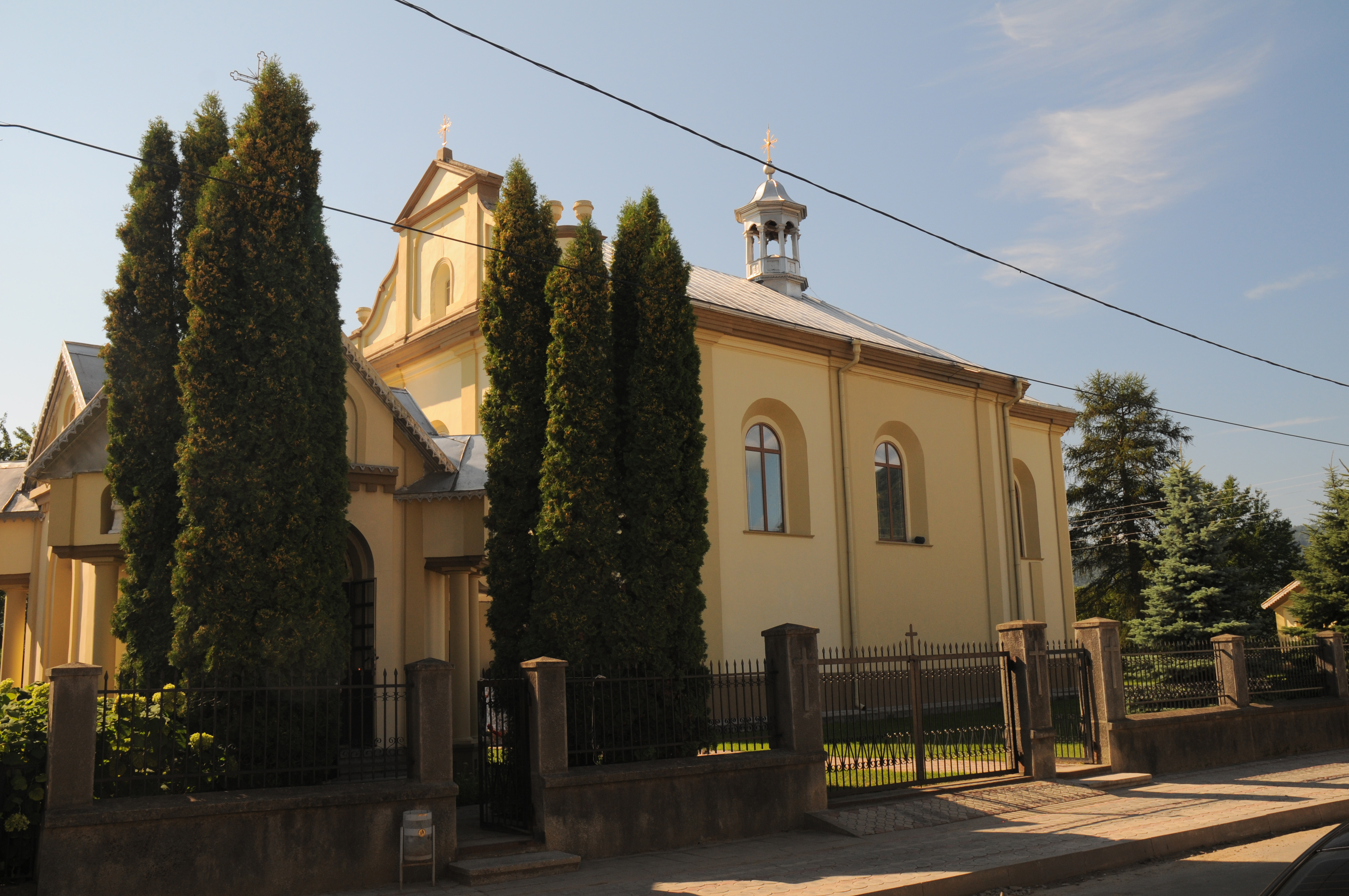
- From top, left to right: Pniv; Kolomyia; Sniatyn; Kuty

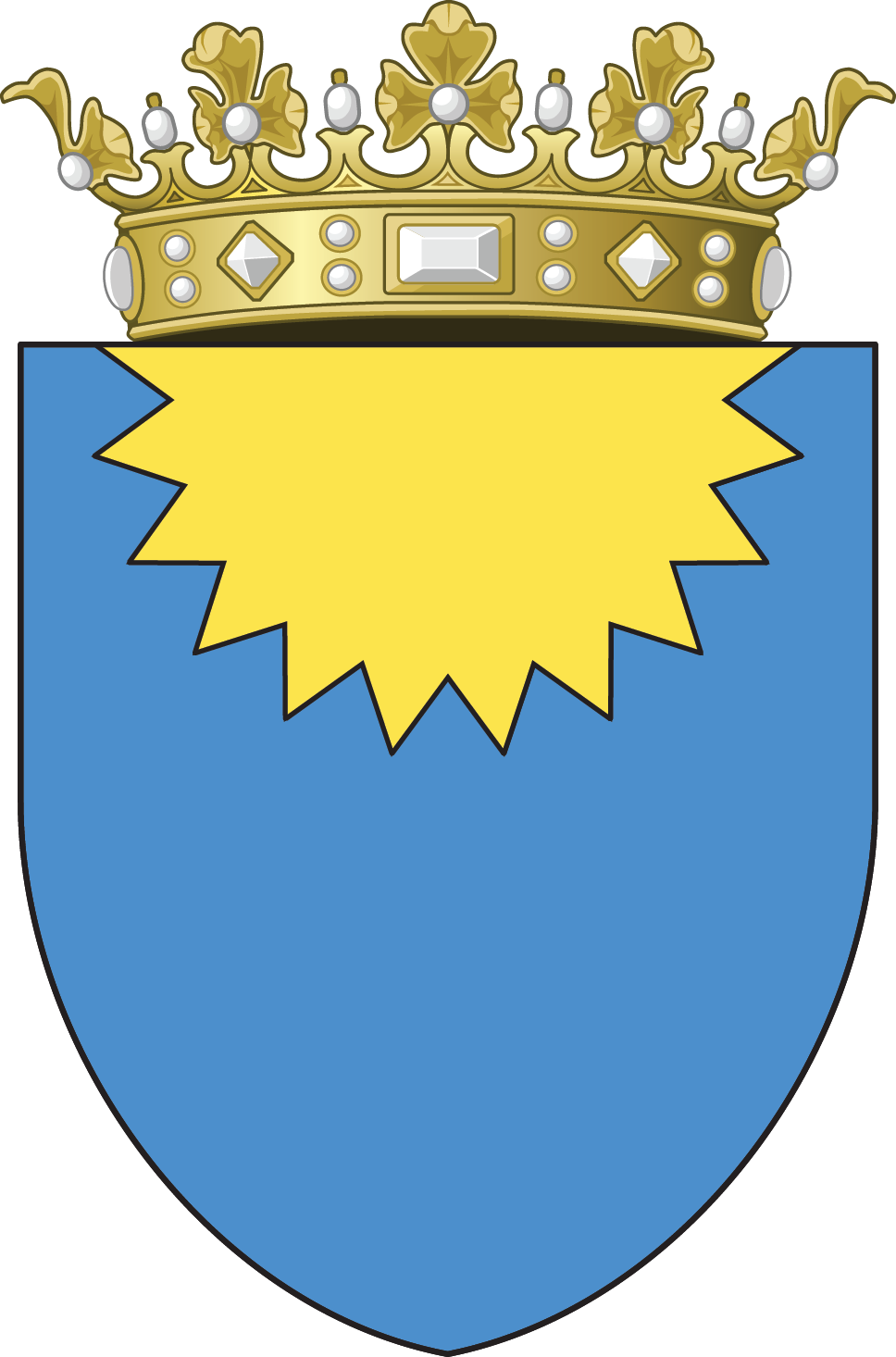
- Coat of arms

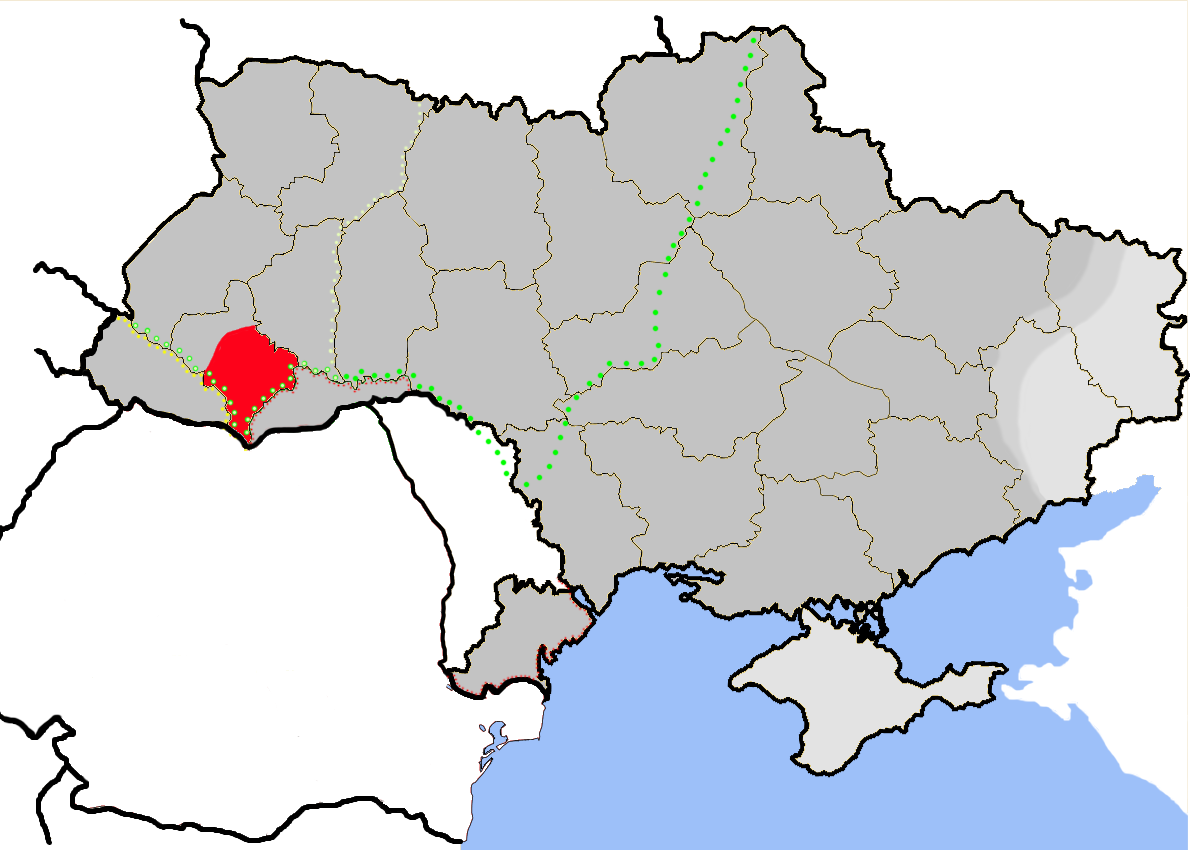
- Pokuttia on the map of Ukraine
- Country: Ukraine
- Largest city: Kolomyia
- Time zone: UTC+2 (EET)
  - Summer (DST): UTC+3 (EEST)

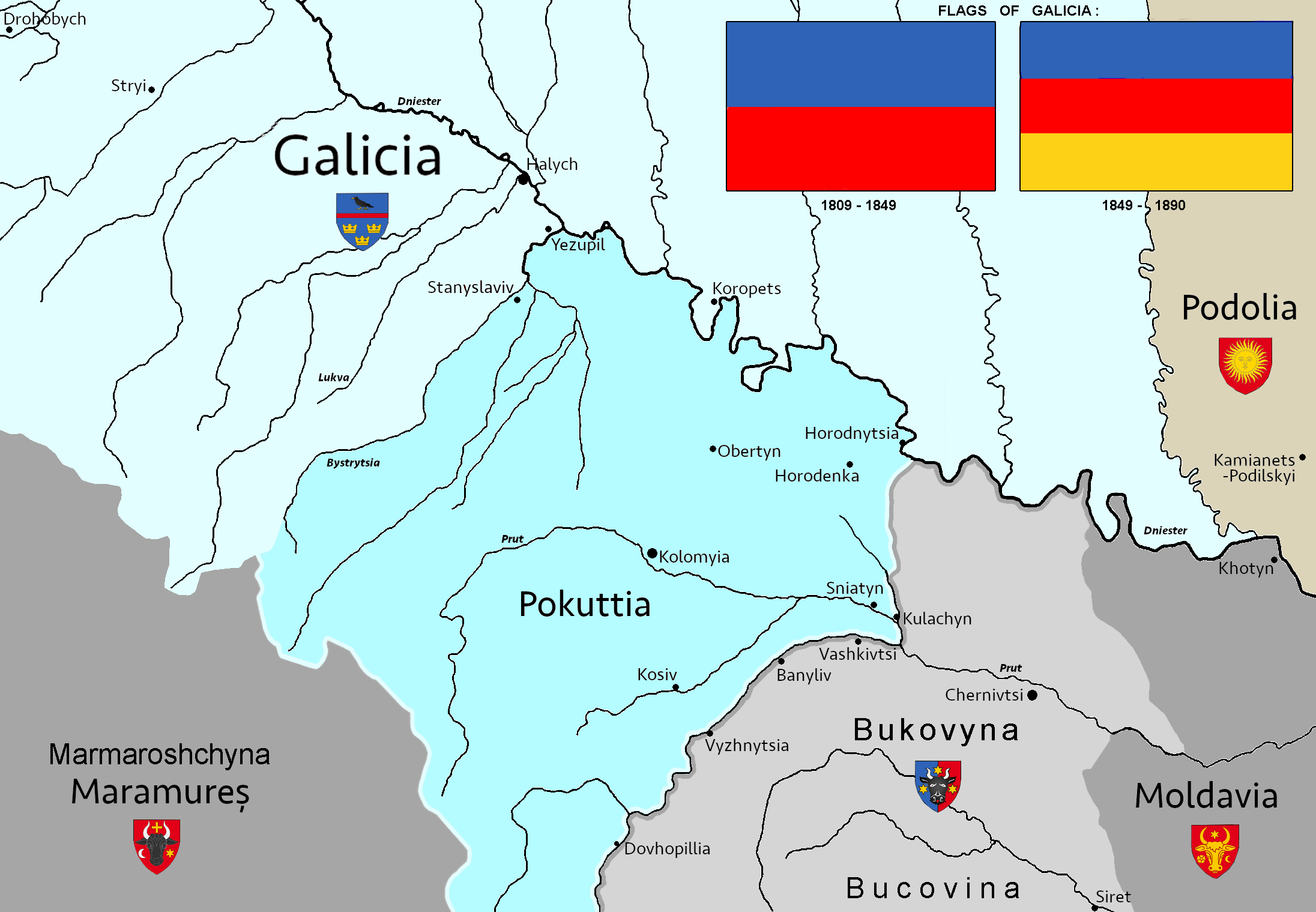
Modern map

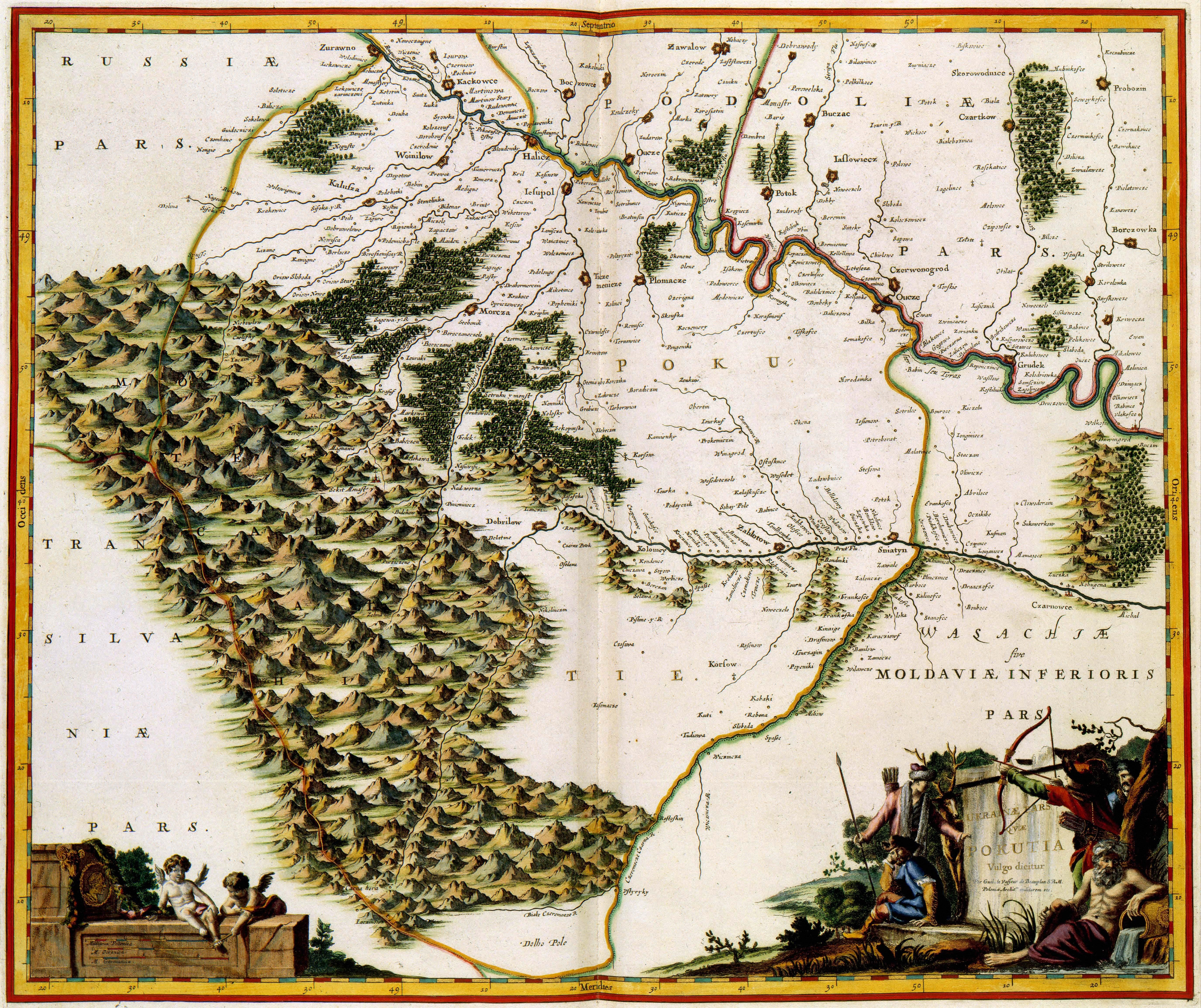
Map of Pokuttia in 1648

Pokuttia, also known as Pokuttya or Pokutia, (Ukrainian: Покуття, Ukrainian pronunciation: [poˈkutʲːɐ]; Polish: Pokucie; Romanian: Pocuția) is a historical area of East-Central Europe, situated between the Dniester and Cheremosh rivers and the Carpathian Mountains, in the southwestern part of modern Ukraine. Although the historic heart of the area was Kolomyia, the name Pokuttia (literally 'around the corner') is derived from the town of Kuty, which literally means 'angles' or 'corners'. The region is now inhabited mainly by Ukrainians.

== History ==
Pokuttia had been a part of the Kievan Rus' and one of its successor states, Halych-Volhynia during the early medieval period. Casimir III the Great moved to incorporate the region into the Kingdom of Poland after the death of Yuri II Boleslav, the last King of Ruthenia, in 1340, claiming dynastic rights.

Władysław II Jagiełło, needing financial support for his battles against the Teutonic Knights, used the region as a guarantee for a loan which he obtained from Petru II of Moldavia, who was able to obtain economic rights over the region in 1388. Petru was eager to gain influence in the internal politics of the Kingdom of Poland, supporting the cause of his long-time allies, the Jagiellons of the Grand Duchy of Lithuania. Moldavia was thus able to exert a degree of influence on the region, however it remained within the territorial limits of the Kingdom of Poland. Eventually, the region became a matter for judicial and military dispute between the two states, because the debt was never repaid in full by Poland.

In 1485, Moldavian prince Stephen the Great, having lost his country's access to the Black Sea the previous year to the Ottomans, was in serious need of alliances. He swore allegiance to Casimir IV Jagiellon, King of Poland in exchange for being allowed to occupy Pokuttia, in what is known as the Colomeea oath. Despite the region being under de facto Moldavian control, Poland still claimed sovereignty over it.

From 1490-1492, due to increased oppression on local Ruthenian peasants under Polish rule, a series of rebellions was led by the Moldavian Petru Muha. The rebellion was joined by other Ruthenians, such as Cossacks and Hutsuls. Known as the Muha Rebellion, this series of revolts was indirectly supported by prince Stephen, and it is one of the earliest known examples of Ruthenian revolts against Polish rule. These rebellions saw the capture of various cities in Pokuttia, reaching as far west as Lviv, as well as deteriorating relations between Moldavia and Poland, due to Stephen's indirect support.

Moreover, Casimir's successor, John I Albert of Poland, who had tried several times to displace Stephen due to his unwillingness to form an alliance with him, invaded Moldavia through Pokuttia itself in 1497. After four months of siege, he failed to take the fortress of Suceava, Moldavia's capital. After abandoning the siege, his army ran into a trap that caused many of his nobles to die at the Battle of the Cosmin Forest.

Following the battle, Pokuttia would remain heavily contested until Poland managed to recapture the region from Moldavia in the Battle of Obertyn in 1531, when Poland's hetman Jan Tarnowski defeated Stephen's son Petru Rareș. Minor Polish–Moldavian clashes for Pokuttia continued for the next 15 years, until Petru Rareș's death. Throughout the early modern period, Obertyn was Pokuttia's main castle, while Kolomyia was the region's main market town and fair. Following the Partitions of Poland of 1772, Pokuttia fell under the Habsburg Monarchy.

In the wake of the World War I and the fall of Austria-Hungary, it became disputed between Poland and the short-lived West Ukrainian People's Republic, which had its seat of government in Stanyslaviv after it failed to hold Lviv. In May 1919, Polish and Romanian forces occupied Pokuttia in order to create a corridor between Poland and Romania. In August 1919, the Romanian Army handed eastern Pokuttia over to Poland. After the Polish–Soviet War, it remained in Poland.

In mid-September 1939, during the invasion of Poland at the start of World War II, the Polish gold reserve was evacuated from Warsaw and stored by the Polish government in Śniatyn, before it was eventually further evacuated via Romania to the territory of Polish-allied France. As a result of the 1939 invasion and partition of Poland by Nazi Germany and the Soviet Union, the area was initially attached to the Ukrainian Soviet Socialist Republic, falling to Nazi control after the start of Operation Barbarossa until 1944. It was then incorporated into the Soviet controlled Western Ukrainian oblast of Ivano-Frankivsk, roughly corresponding to the southern half of the oblast.

Pokuttia's population still has some Romanian/Moldovan communities to this day. At the 2001 census there were 600 Romanians and Moldovans recorded.

== Language ==
The Pokuttia–Bukovina dialects differ from the northern Ukrainian dialects in the change, independently of stress, of the ancient vowels ō, ē into i (u, ü, ’u, ’ü in the subdialects of the Carpathian Mountains region), ě into ’i, and ę into ’a (’e [’y], ’i in the subdialects of Bukovyna and central Galicia), and in morphological, syntactic, and lexical peculiarities. They differ from the southeastern dialects in retaining many phonetic and morphological archaisms and allowing fewer phonetic innovations. The dialect preserved several archaic endings and soft declension, and certain lexical peculiarities, including Romanianisms. The expansion of ancient Pokuttian phonetic features in the 14th–16th centuries in western Podolia contributed to the formation of a broader group of Dniester dialects.

== List of cities ==
- Nadvirna (Polish: Nadwórna)
- Deliatyn (Polish: Delatyn)
- Hody-Dobrovidka (Polish: Gody-Dobrowódka)
- Kobaky (Polish: Kobaki)
- Kolomyia (Polish: Kołomyja, Romanian: Colomeea)
- Kosiv (Polish: Kosów Huculski, Romanian: Cosău)
- Kosmach (Polish: Kosmacz)
- Kuty, Stari Kuty (Polish: Kuty, Romanian: Cuturi)
- Lanchyn (Polish: Łanczyn)
- Pechenizhyn (Polish: Peczeniżyn)
- Obertyn (Polish: Obertyn, Romanian: Obertin)
- Verkhovyna (Polish: Żabie)
- Vorokhta (Polish: Worochta)
- Yabluniv (Polish: Jabłonków)
- Yaremche (Polish: Jaremcze)
- Zabolotiv (Polish: Zabłotów)
