= Stalinist repressions =

Stalinist repressions may refer to:

- Stalinism#Purges and executions
- Stalinist repressions in Mongolia
- Stalinist repressions in Azerbaijan
