= Yulian Hoyiv =

Ukrainian and Soviet military officer (1894–1937)

- Юліан-Володимир Іванович Гоїв
- Born: 27 April 1894; Sniatyn, Kingdom of Galicia and Lodomeria, Austria-Hungary
- Died: 10 December 1937 (aged 43); Kharkiv, Ukrainian Soviet Socialist Republic, Soviet Union
- Resting place: Memorial Park, Kharkiv
- Education: Brno University of Technology; Frunze Military Academy
- Military career
- Allegiance: Austria-Hungary (1914–1918); West Ukrainian People's Republic (1918–1920); Soviet Union (1920–1937)
- Branch: Austro-Hungarian Army; Ukrainian Galician Army; Red Army
- Rank: Poruchnyk (UHA); Major (Red Army)
- Commands: Ukrainian Sich Riflemen; 1st USS Brigade; 23rd Rifle Division
- Conflicts: World War I * Battle of Makivka (POW); Polish–Ukrainian War * Battle of Lviv (1918) * Vovchukhiv offensive * Chortkiv offensive Polish–Soviet War
- Awards: Engraved gold watch (1927)

Yulian-Volodymyr Ivanovych Hoyiv (Ukrainian: Юліан-Володимир Іванович Гоїв; 27 April 1894 – 10 December 1937) was a Ukrainian and Soviet military officer who served in the Legion of Ukrainian Sich Riflemen, the Ukrainian Galician Army, and the Red Army. Executed during the Great Purge in 1937, he was posthumously rehabilitated in April 2025.

== Biography ==
=== Early life and World War I ===
Hoyiv was born on 27 April 1894 in Sniatyn (then part of Austria-Hungary) into the family of cantor and choirmaster Ivan Hoyiv. After graduating from the Sniatyn Imperial-Royal Realschule in 1912, he enrolled at the Brno University of Technology and served as deputy head of the Sniatyn branch of the Ukrainian Student Union.

Following the outbreak of World War I in August 1914, Hoyiv volunteered for the Legion of Ukrainian Sich Riflemen (USS), taking the military oath in Stryi on 3 September 1914. Wounded near Volovets in December 1914, he completed officer training in Mukachevo in early 1915, attained the rank of khorunzhyi (ensign), and commanded a platoon in the 1st USS Company. On 4 May 1915, he was wounded and captured by Russian forces during the Battle of Makivka. Between 1915 and early 1918, he was held in prisoner-of-war camps in Cherny Yar, Astrakhan, and Tsaritsyn, where he was interned alongside Yevhen Konovalets and Vasyl Poraiko.

=== Ukrainian Galician Army and Red Army ===
Returning to Galicia in 1918, Hoyiv joined the 1st USS Brigade of the Ukrainian Galician Army (UHA) during the Polish–Ukrainian War. Promoted to poruchnyk (lieutenant) in July 1919, he commanded a platoon and later a company in the Battle of Lviv (1918), the Battle of Khyriv, the Vovchukhiv offensive, and the Chortkiv offensive. In March–May 1920, following the UHA's integration into the Red Ukrainian Galician Army (ChUHA), he commanded the 2nd Battalion of the 1st USS Brigade. From 1920 to 1923, Hoyiv served as intelligence chief and regimental adjutant in the 132nd Brigade (later Regiment) of the 44th Rifle Division of the Red Army. Moving to Kharkiv in 1924, he worked in the intelligence department of the Ukrainian Military District under Gustav Baar, heading its information sector due to his fluency in German, Polish, French, and English. He graduated from the evening division of the Frunze Military Academy in 1935 and completed armored courses in Leningrad in 1932. From 1932 to 1936, he served as military instructor at the Kharkiv Tractor Plant automotive technical college, and in late 1936, holding the rank of major, he became head of the armored and motor depot of the 23rd Rifle Division.

=== Arrest, execution, and rehabilitation ===
On 22 September 1937, during the Great Purge, Hoyiv was arrested by the NKVD in Kharkiv. Interrogators accused him of espionage for Germany and Poland and of maintaining links with Organization of Ukrainian Nationalists leader Yevhen Konovalets and former UHA officer Hans Koch. On 10 December 1937, a visiting session of the Military Collegium of the Supreme Court of the Soviet Union sentenced him to death under Articles 54-1b, 54-8, and 54-11 of the Criminal Code of the Ukrainian SSR; he was executed in Kharkiv the same day and buried in a mass grave at the site of the present-day Memorial Park.

On 29 April 2025, following a petition submitted by historian Andrii Boida, the National Rehabilitation Commission of Ukraine posthumously rehabilitated Hoyiv.

== Sources ==
- Alekseyev, M. A.; Kolpakidi, A. I.; Kochik, V. Ya. (2012). Entsiklopediya voyennoy razvedki. 1918–1945 gg (in Russian). Moscow: Kuchkovo pole. pp. 235–236.
- Boida, Andrii (2024). "Naslidky rosiiskoho polonu (1915–1918) v doliakh Yu. Hoiva ta V. Poraika". Ukraina kriz pryzmu viiny (in Ukrainian). Ivano-Frankivsk. pp. 15–25.
- Boida, Andrii (2024). "Uchast Vasylia Poraika ta brativ Hoiviv v roboti sektsii Ukrainskoho Studentskoho Soiuzu v m. Sniatyn (1911—1921)". Halychyna (in Ukrainian) (37): 140–149.
- Boida, Andrii (2025). "Reabilitovanyi cherez 88 rokiv". Lokalna istoriia (in Ukrainian) (7–8): 140–145.
- Rutkowski, Ernst (2009). Die k.k. Ukrainische Legion 1914–1918. Österreichische militärhistorische Forschungen (in German). Vol. 9/10. p. 129.
- Siredzhuk, Petro (2024). Sichovi Striltsi i Starshyny Sniatynshchyny i Zabolotivshchyny (in Ukrainian). Lviv: Halych-Pres. p. 138.
- Vasechko, Oleksii (2019). "Ostannii pokhid Ukrainskykh Sichovykh Striltsiv: kviten – traven 1920 r.". Tsytadela (in Ukrainian) (16): 29–69.
