= Vasyl Kasiian =

Soviet Ukrainian painter (1896–1976)

People's Painter Vasyl Kasiian
- Василь Касіян
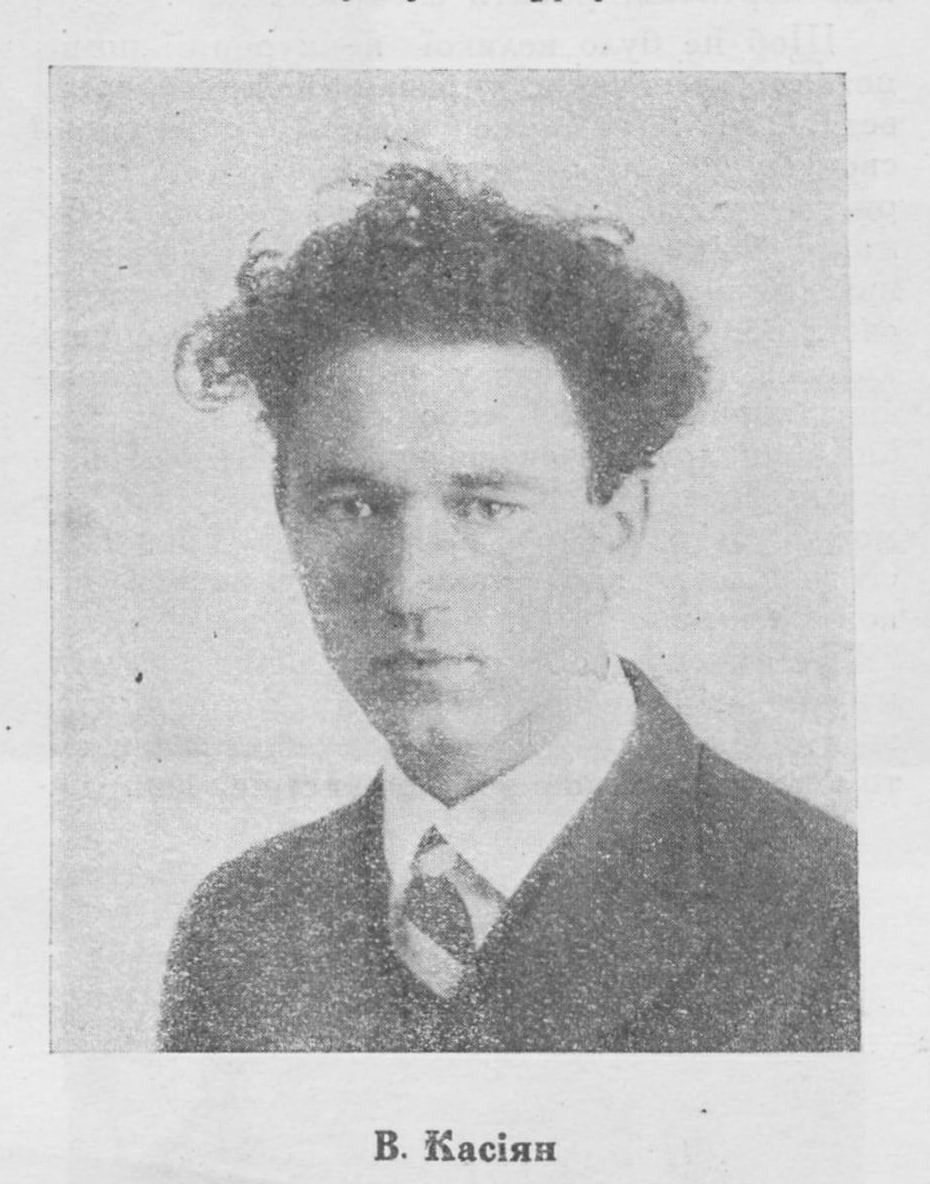
- Kasiian in 1927
- Born: Vasyl Illich Kasiian; 1 January 1896; Mykulyntsi, Kingdom of Galicia and Lodomeria, Austria-Hungary (now Sniatyn, Ukraine)
- Died: 26 June 1976 (aged 80); Kyiv, Ukrainian SSR, Soviet Union
- Occupations: Artist, graphic
- Writing career
- Notable awards: Shevchenko National Prize; Order of Lenin

Vasyl Illich Kasiian (Ukrainian: Василь Ілліч Касіян; 1 January 1896 – 26 June 1976) was a Soviet Ukrainian painter, graphic, parliamentarian, People's Painter of the USSR, academician of the Academy of Arts of the Soviet Union.

== Biography ==
A native of Eastern Galicia, during World War I Kasiian was transferred to the Italian Front as a serviceman of the Austro-Hungarian Army. In 1918 he ended up in a camp for prisoners of war at Monte Cassino, staying there until his repatriation to Austria in 1920. During the 1920s he studied at the Academy of Fine Arts, Prague as a pupil of Czech painter Max Švabinský. During that period he also attended lectures of philosophy at the Charles University and created a number of posters promoting famine relief during the 1921-1923 famine in Ukraine.

Having adopted Soviet citizenship in 1923, four years later Kasiian moved to Soviet Ukraine, where he taught at the art institutes of Kyiv and Kharkiv and became a member of the Association of Revolutionary Artists of Ukraine and "Zhovten" artists' union. He became one of the founders of the Ukrainian Polygraphic Institute in Kharkiv. In 1940 he participated in a meeting with metropolitan Andrey Sheptytsky, dedicated to the hierarch's 75th jubilee. During World War II Kasiian continued his work in evacuation in Samarkand.

In 1944 Kasiian became head of the graphic arts chair at the Kyiv Arts Institute. He also served as the director of Arts Studies Institute at the Academy of Sciences of Ukrainian SSR. In 1947 he became a member of the Academy of Arts of the Soviet Union, and in 1950 was accepted into the Academy of Architecture of Ukrainian SSR. Kasiian took part in numerous exhibitions and was a participant of Venice Biennale.

Between 1962 and 1968 Kasiian served as head of the Union of Artists of Ukrainian SSR. In 1964 he received the Shevchenko State Prize for his illustrations to the Kobzar, and in 1971 was awarded with the State Prize of Ukrainian SSR for his work on the six-volume History of Ukrainian Art. On 11 January 1974 Presidium of the Supreme Soviet of the Soviet Union awarded Kasiian with the title of Hero of Socialist Labour and Order of Lenin. He was also a member of the Supreme Soviet of the Ukrainian SSR in four convocations. He died on 26 June 1976.

== Works ==
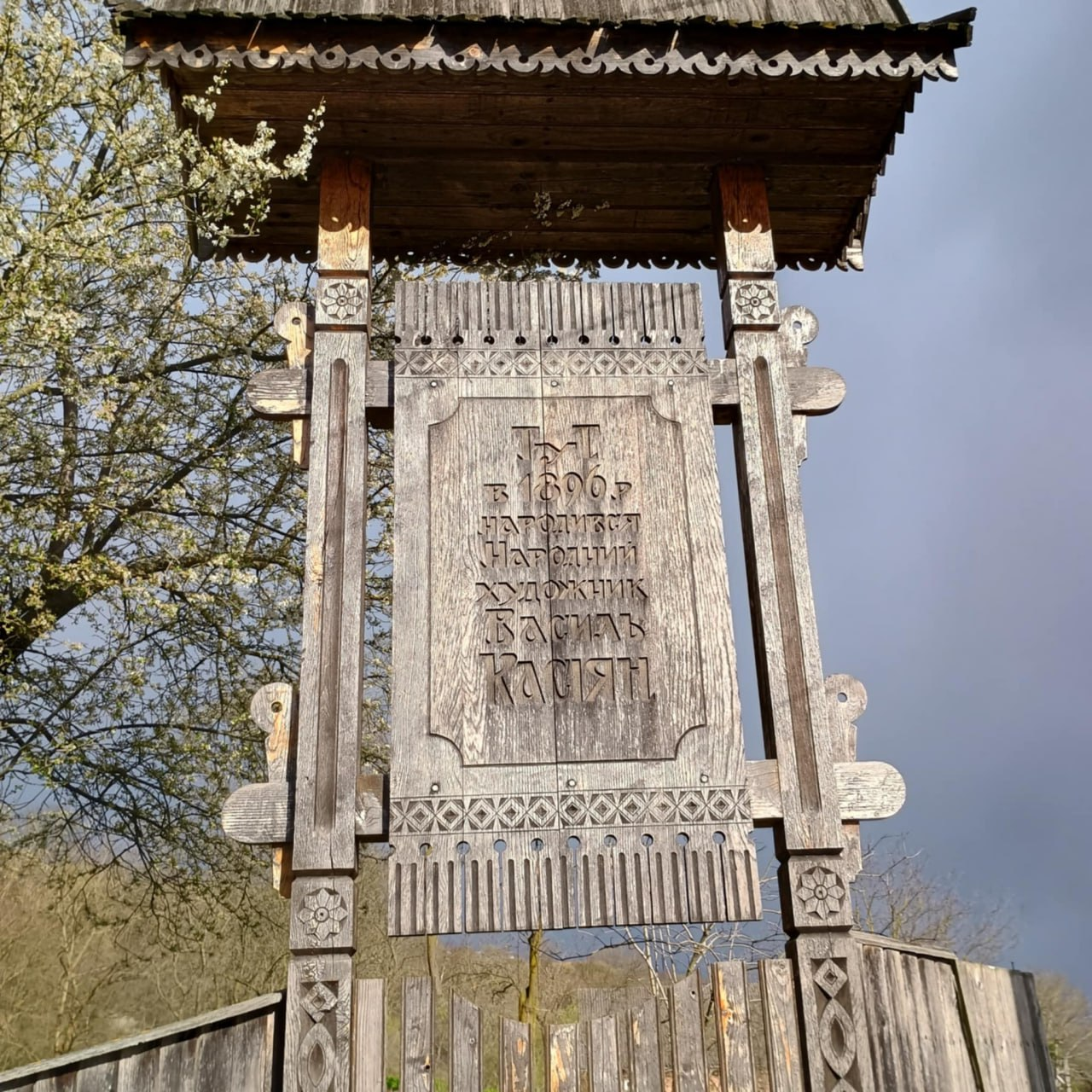
Memorial plaque to Vasyl Kasiian in his native village

=== Art ===
Throughout his life Kasiian created around 10,000 works in various genres. He mastered numerous graphic techniques, including woodcut, copper engraving, linocut, lithograph, drawing with feather and aquarel. During his early period of activity in Prague Kasiian created critical realist works on social topics. Following his move to the Soviet Union, he was employed in state propaganda, creating depictions of happy kolkhoz peasants and presenting Ukraine as a blooming land at the time when the country was suffering from famine and persecutions of intelligentsia. Among others, Kasiian authored panegyric depictions of Lenin and Stalin, as well as engravings dedicated to the Dnieper Hydroelectric Station and Donbas.

Kasiian's work as illustrator encompassed writings by Taras Shevchenko, Nikolai Gogol, Ivan Franko, Mykhailo Kotsiubynsky, Vasyl Stefanyk, Olha Kobylianska and Arkhyp Teslenko. He also created numerous portraits of Ukrainian authors and artists. Influences of Socialist realism led Kasiian to adopt naturalistic elements and imitation of painting techniques in his works.

During the last years of his life Kasiian created a number of murals for the Feofaniia hospital in Kyiv.

=== Publications ===
Kasiian authored a number of articles dedicated to graphical techniques and to the creativity of artists Olena Kulchytska, Ivan Yizhakevych, Taras Shevchenko, Leonardo da Vinci, Raphael and Rembrandt.

Cultural offices
Preceded by Oleksandr Pashchenko	Head of the National Union of Artists of Ukraine; 1944–1949 with second term (1962–1968)	Succeeded by Oleksiy Shovkunenko
Preceded by Mykhailo Derehus	Head of the National Union of Artists of Ukraine; 1944–1949 with second term (1962–1968)	Succeeded by Vasyl Borodai
