= Sniatyn =

Urban locality in Ivano-Frankivsk Oblast, Ukraine

Sniatyn Снятин Śniatyn
- City
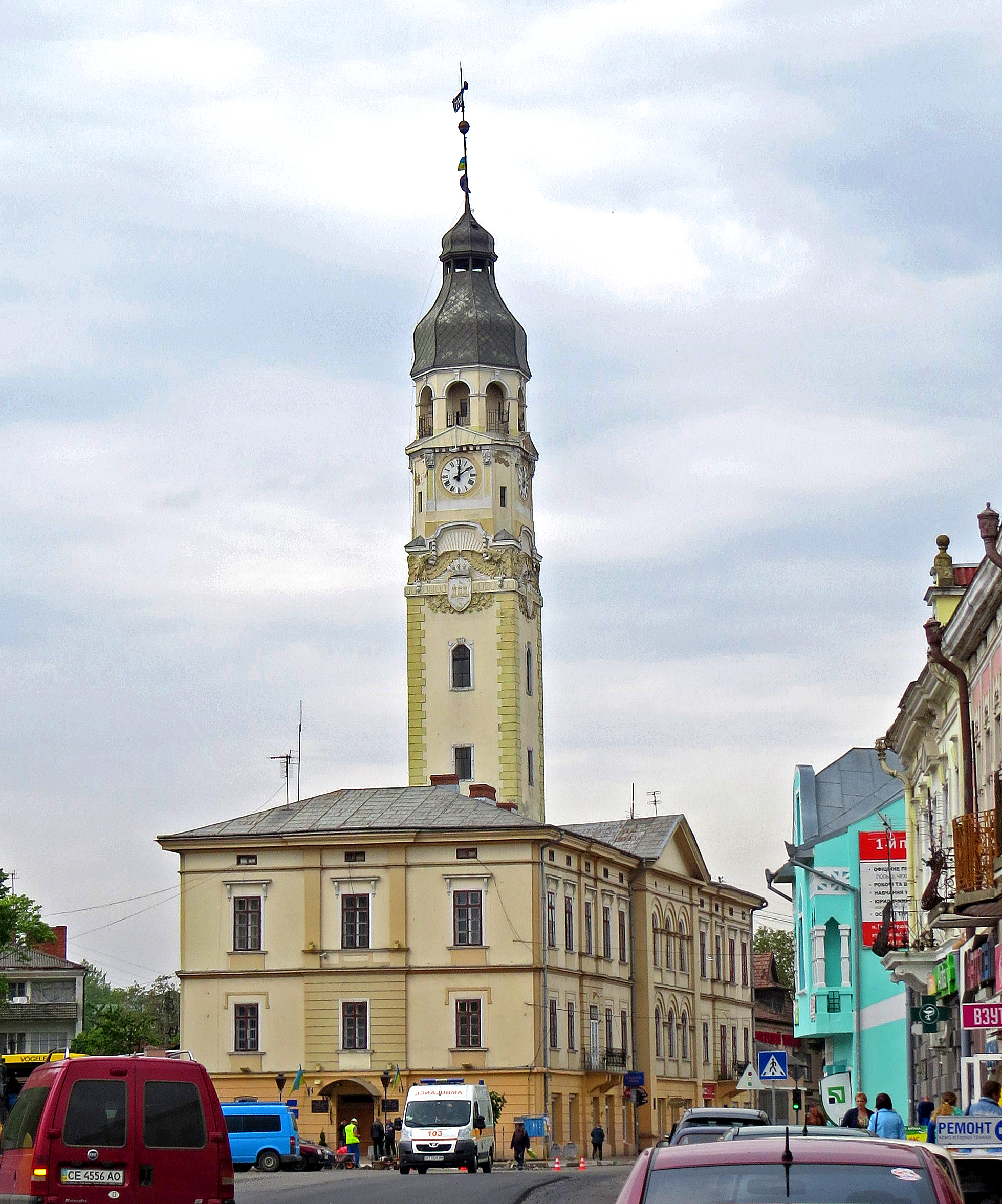
- Town hall

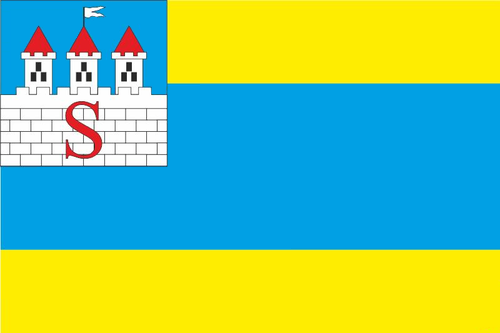
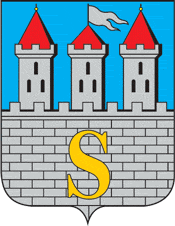
- Flag Coat of arms

- Location within Ivano-Frankivsk Oblast Location within Ukraine
- Coordinates: 48°27′00″N 25°34′00″E
- Country: Ukraine
- Oblast: Ivano-Frankivsk Oblast
- Raion: Kolomyia Raion
- Hromada: Sniatyn urban hromada
- First mentioned: 1158

Population (2022)
  - Total: 9,718

Sniatyn (Ukrainian: Снятин, IPA: [ˈsʲnʲɑtɪn]; Polish: Śniatyn; Romanian: Sneatîn, older Sniatin; Yiddish: שניאַטין) is a city located in Kolomyia Raion of Ivano-Frankivsk Oblast, in western Ukraine along the Prut river, in the historic region of Pokutia. Sniatyn hosts the administration of Sniatyn urban hromada, one of the hromadas of Ukraine. Population: 9,718 (2022 estimate). In 2001, population was around 10,500.

In the interbellum period, it was a rail border crossing between Poland and Romania.

== History ==
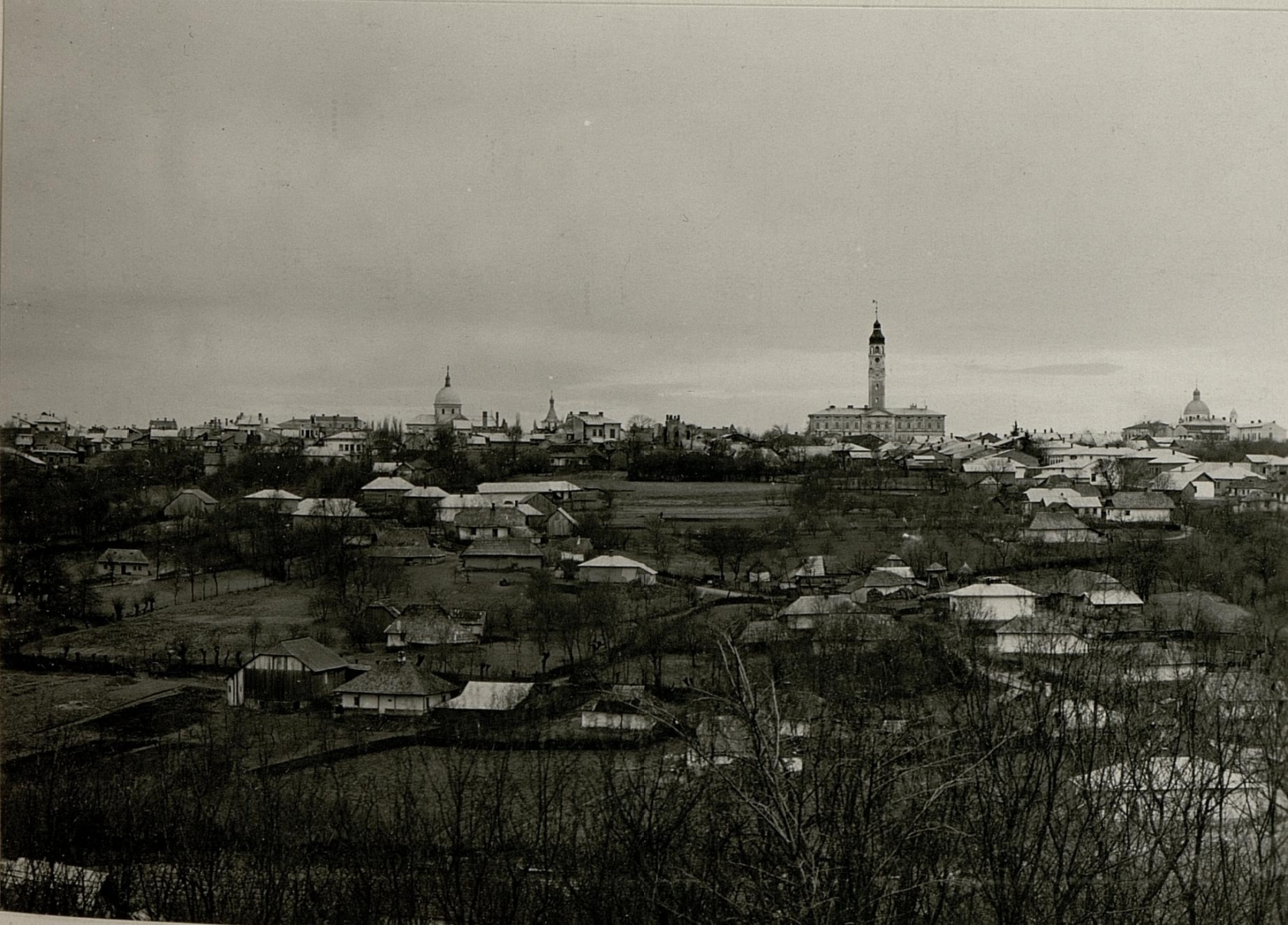
Sniatyn during World War I

The first mention of the town is in 1158. Ksniatyn was named after Kostiantyn Stroslavich, a boyar and general of Yaroslav Osmomysl—a prince of medieval Halych Principality. From 1416 comes the first mention of an Armenian in Śniatyn. The town was given the Magdeburg rights in 1448. In 1628, an Armenian commune was established by King Sigismund III Vasa, one of several such communes in Poland. As a result of the First Partition of Poland, Sniatyn (and Galicia) was attributed to the Habsburg monarchy. In the interwar period, Śniatyn was part of reborn independent Poland, within which it was a county seat in the Stanisławów Voivodeship.

In 1939, Śniatyn was the temporary seat of American embassy in Poland, as the diplomatic personnel abandoned Warsaw after the first German Nazi bombings at the start of World War II. In mid-September 1939, the Polish gold reserve was evacuated from Warsaw and stored by the Polish government in Śniatyn, before it was eventually further evacuated via Romania to the territory of Polish-allied France. Afterwards, the town was occupied by the Soviet Union until 1941, then by Germany until 1944, and re-occupied by the Soviet Union, which annexed it from Poland in 1945. Nearly all of Sniatyn's Jewish population was murdered during the Holocaust. Many were shot and buried in the local forest. Some died from disease and starvation in the ghetto. Approximately 1,500 people were sent to Belzec.

Until 18 July 2020, Sniatyn was the administrative center of Sniatyn Raion. The raion was abolished in July 2020 as part of the administrative reform of Ukraine, which reduced the number of raions of Ivano-Frankivsk Oblast to six. The area of Sniatyn Raion was merged into Kolomyia Raion.

== Notable residents ==
- Vasyl Andrusiak (1915–1946), Ukrainian military commander, colonel of the Ukrainian Insurgent Army
- Mykhailo Bazhanskyi (1910–1994), Ukrainian public and political figure, writer, publicist, local historian, and member of the Ukrainian Military Organization and Plast
- Ivan Dluzhanskyi (1847–1916), Ukrainian lawyer, public figure, and deputy to the Austrian Imperial Council
- Semen Horuk (1873–1920), Ukrainian journalist, public figure, and otaman (major) of the Legion of Ukrainian Sich Riflemen and the Ukrainian Galician Army
- Yevhen Hoyiv (1899–1953), sotnyk (captain) of the 1st Brigade of the Ukrainian Sich Riflemen and interwar and émigré public figure
- Omelian Hoyiv (1901–1989), khorunzhyi of the Ukrainian Galician Army, forestry engineer, and Ukrainian student activist in Czechoslovakia
- Yulian Hoyiv (1894–1937), officer of the Legion of Ukrainian Sich Riflemen and the Ukrainian Galician Army, later Red Army major, executed during the Great Purge
- Zenon-Yaroslav Hoyiv (1906–1994), Ukrainian military, public, and cultural figure, member of the Organization of Ukrainian Nationalists
- Volodymyr Humennyi (1937–2022), Ukrainian painter and graphic artist, member of the National Union of Artists of Ukraine
- Borys Hutsuliak (1943–2009), Ukrainian sculptor
- Mariia Karpiuk (1900–1978), Ukrainian painter who interned at the Louvre
- Vasyl Kasiian (1896–1976), Ukrainian graphic artist, People's Artist of the USSR, professor at the Kyiv Art Institute, and Hero of Socialist Labour
- Yaroslav Lukavetskyi (1908–1993), Ukrainian painter from the art school of Oleksa Novakivskyi
- Bohdan Nitsovych (1940–2007), Ukrainian physicist
- Ihor Nitsovych (born 1971), Ukrainian medical scientist
- Roman Nitsovych (1944–2016), Ukrainian medical scientist
- Volodymyr Nitsovych (1931–1992), Ukrainian physicist
- Otto Riekrich (1906–1980), Gestapo officer who saved residents of Sniatyn from Nazi reprisals in 1941–1944
- Marko Romanovych (1896–1976), Ukrainian Greek Catholic priest, Basilian monk, and church and public figure in Canada
- Roman Rubinger (1893–1964), violinist and long-serving director of the Kolomyia Music School
- Nadiia Samuliak (born 1945), Ukrainian television journalist
- Mordechai Shatner (1904–1964), Israeli public figure and signatory of the Israeli Declaration of Independence
- Roman Stepankov (born 1989), Ukrainian professional footballer
- Roman Turyn (1900–1979), Ukrainian portrait painter and public figure
- Vasyl Vynohradnyk (1892–1971), machine-gun company commander in the Ukrainian Galician Army and participant in the First Congress of Ukrainian Nationalists
- Iryna Zinkovska (born 1974), Ukrainian singer, Merited Artist of Ukraine

== Gallery ==
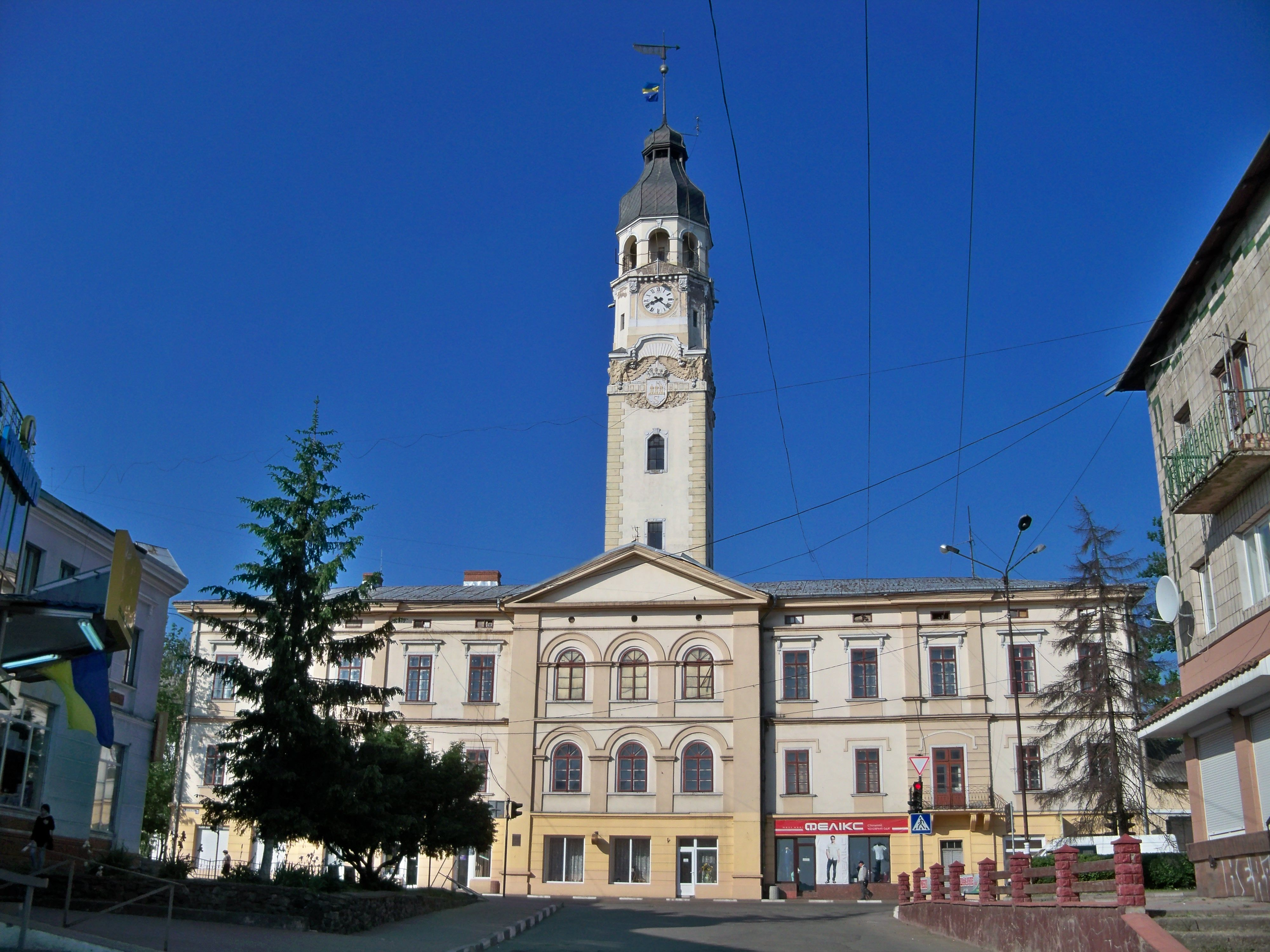
Sniatyn Town Hall

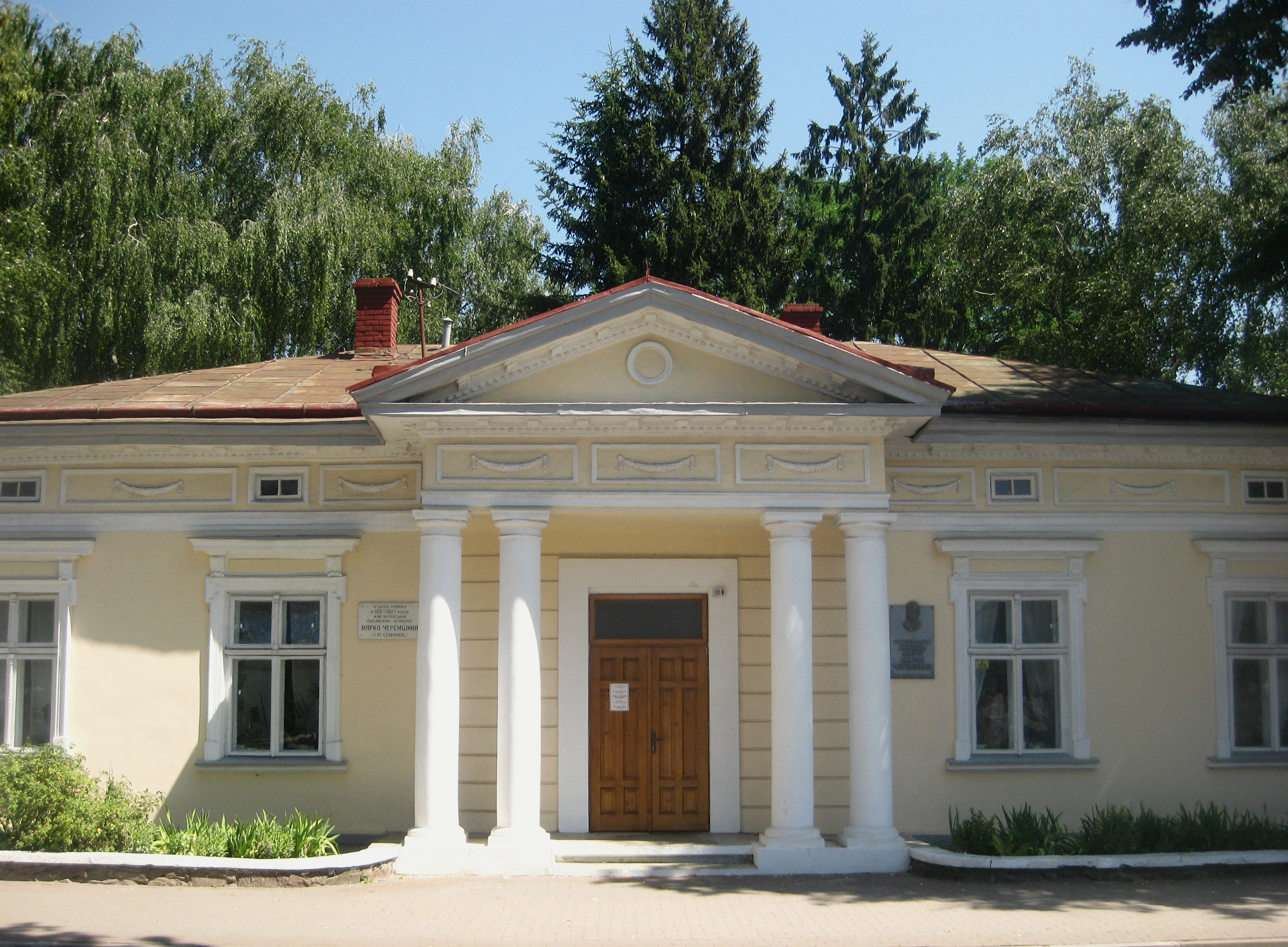
Marko Cheremshyna Literary Memorial Museum

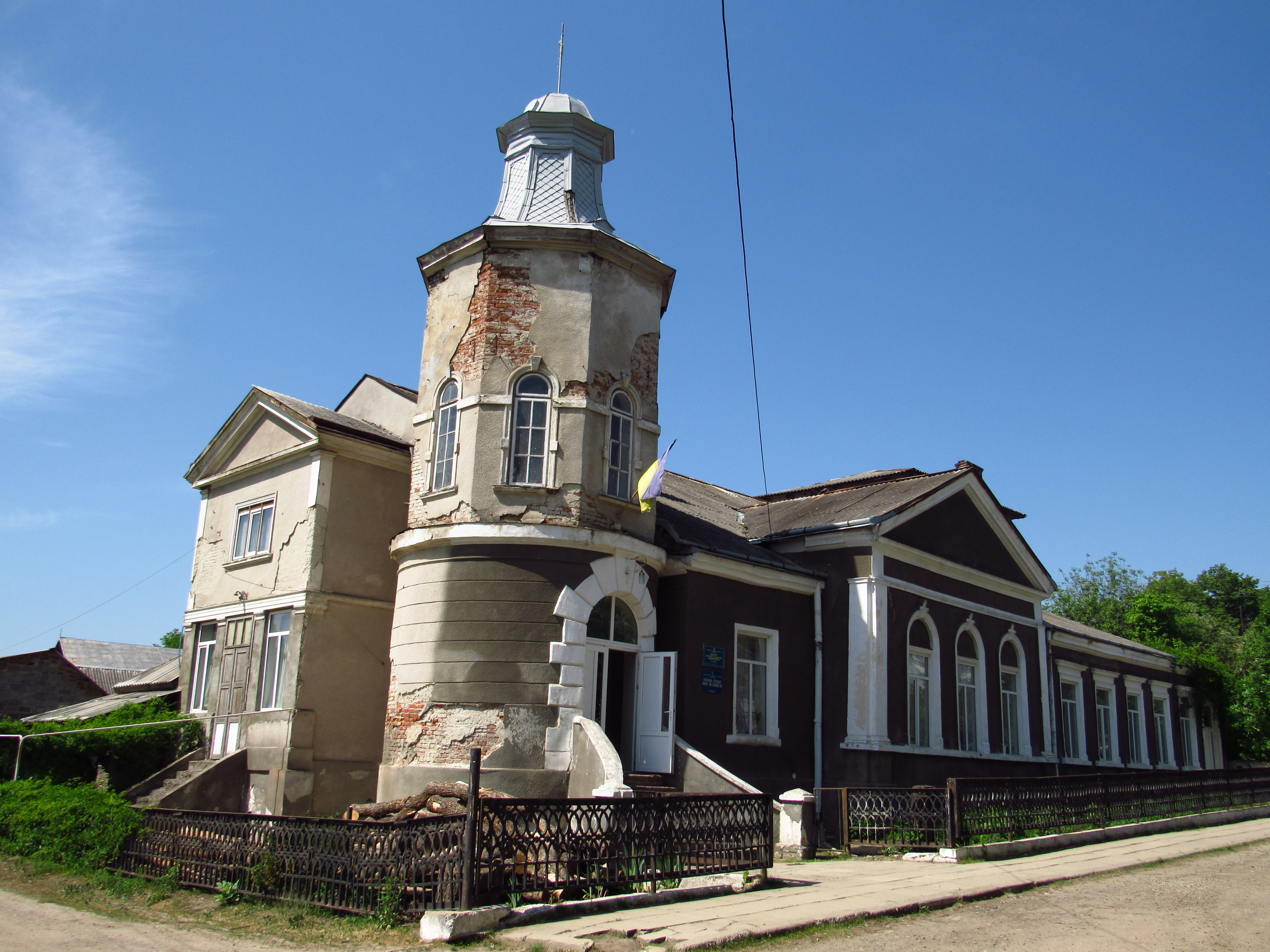
Sokil Society Building

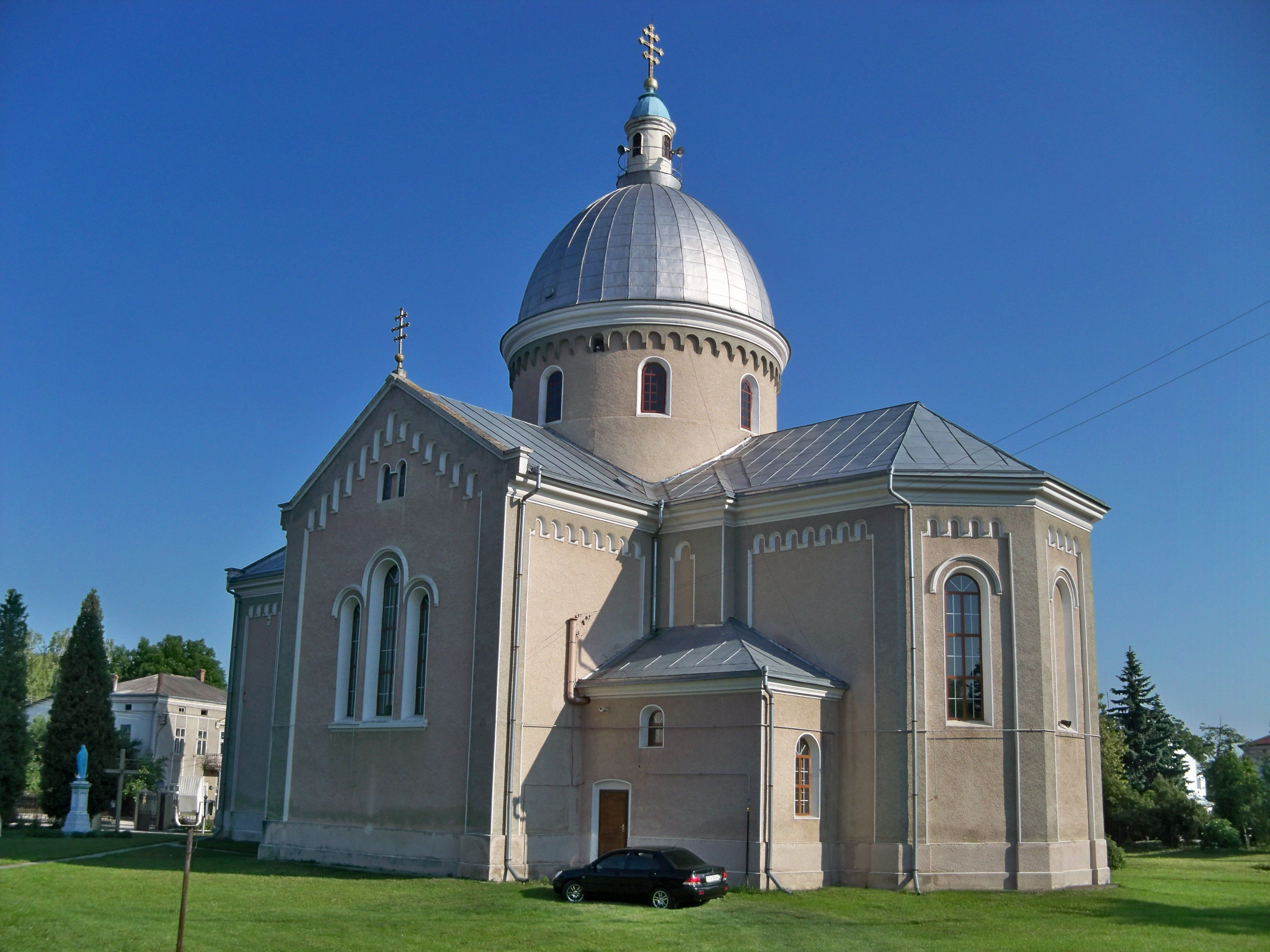
Church of the Miracle of Saint Michael

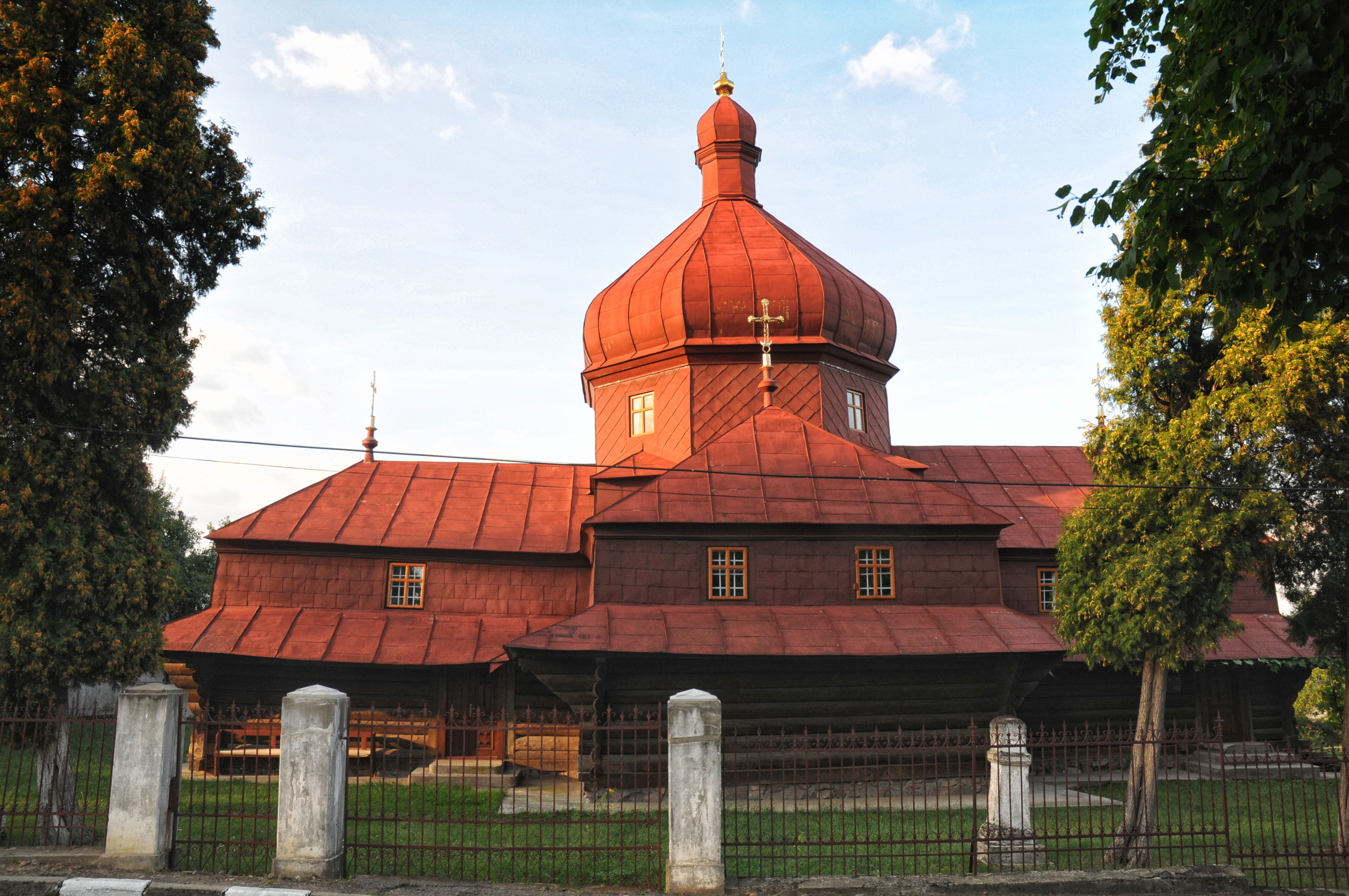
Church of the Ascension (Orthodox Church of Ukraine)

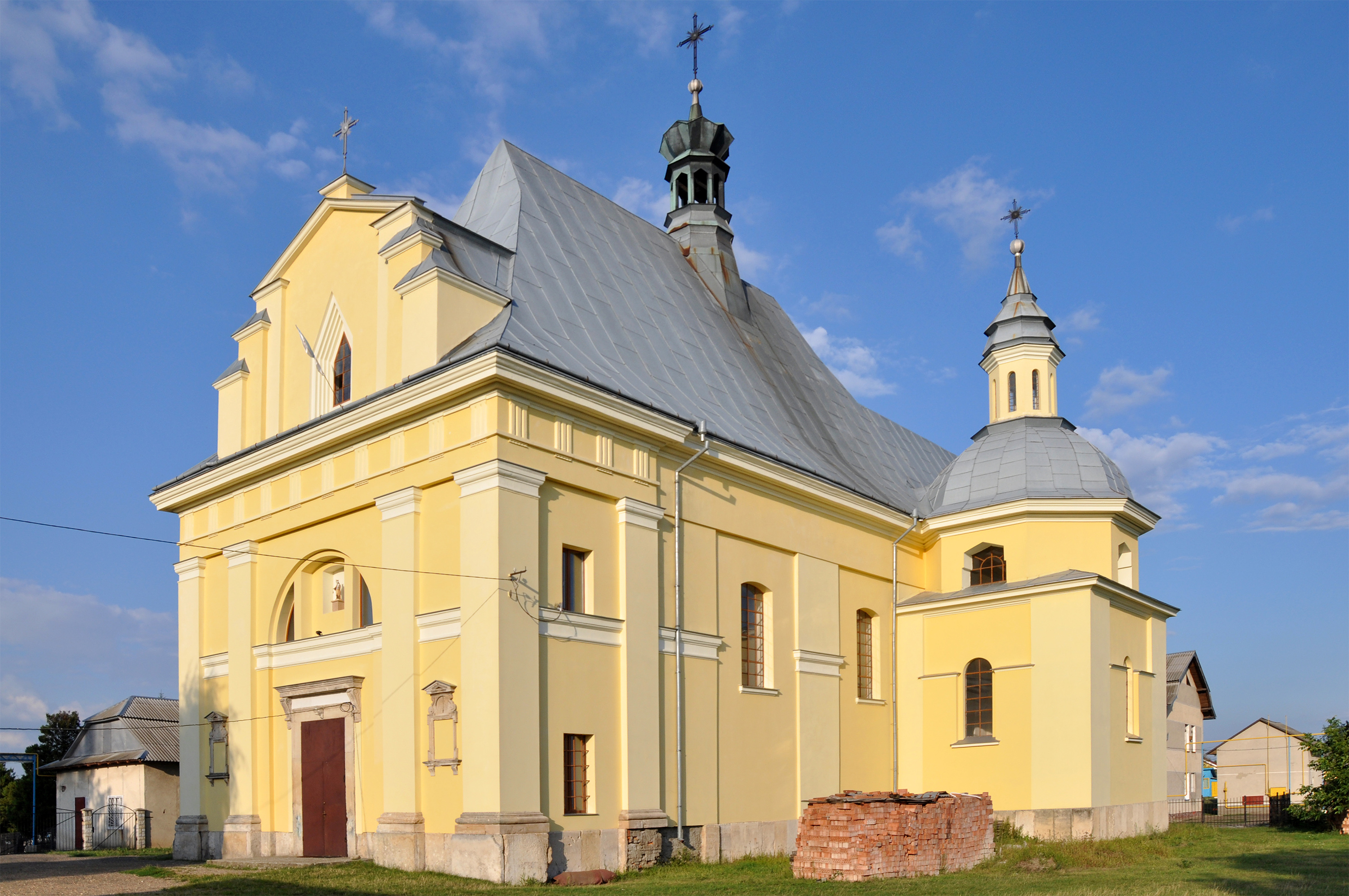
Church of Our Lady of Mount Carmel

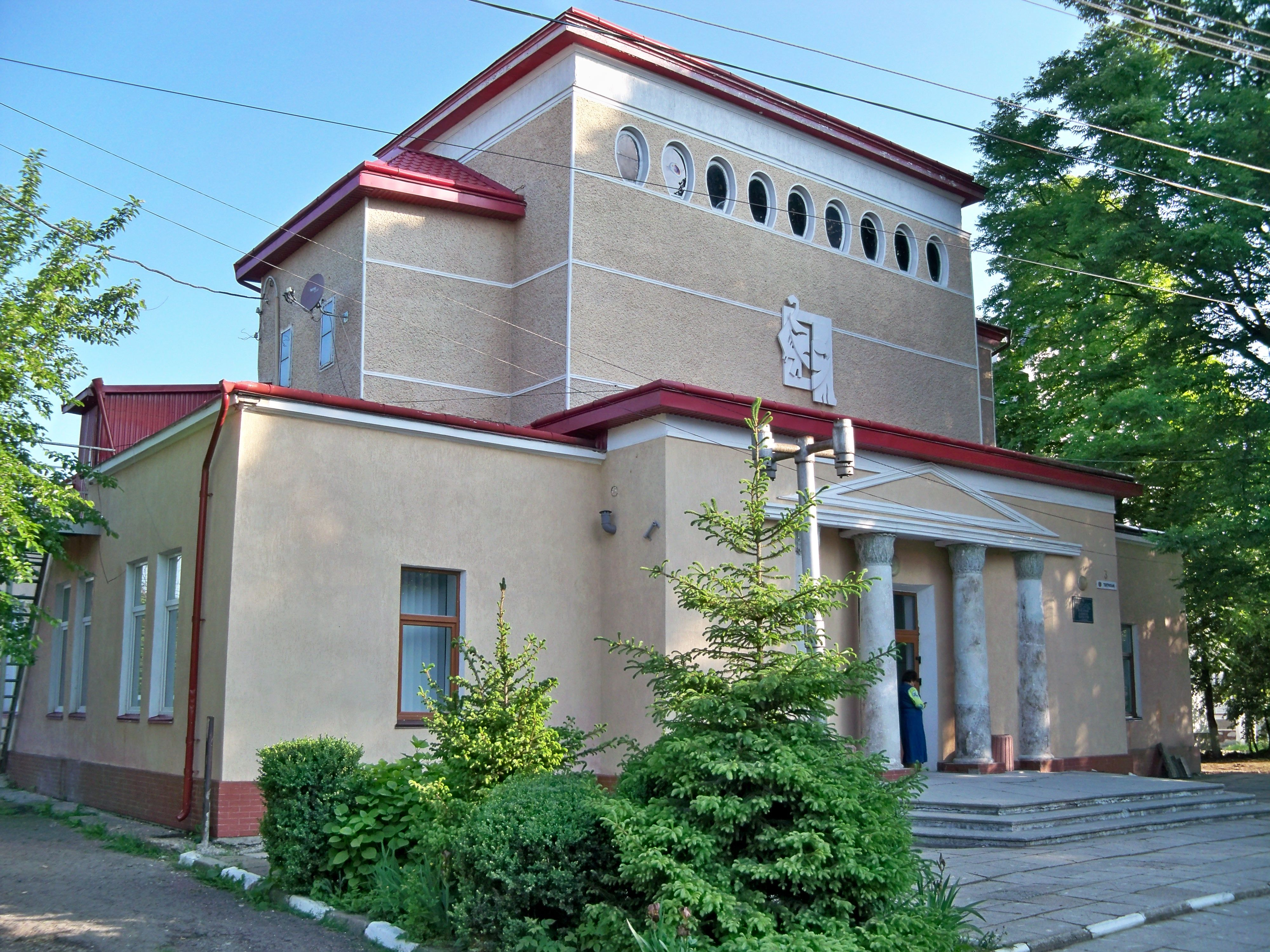
Jewish Theatre

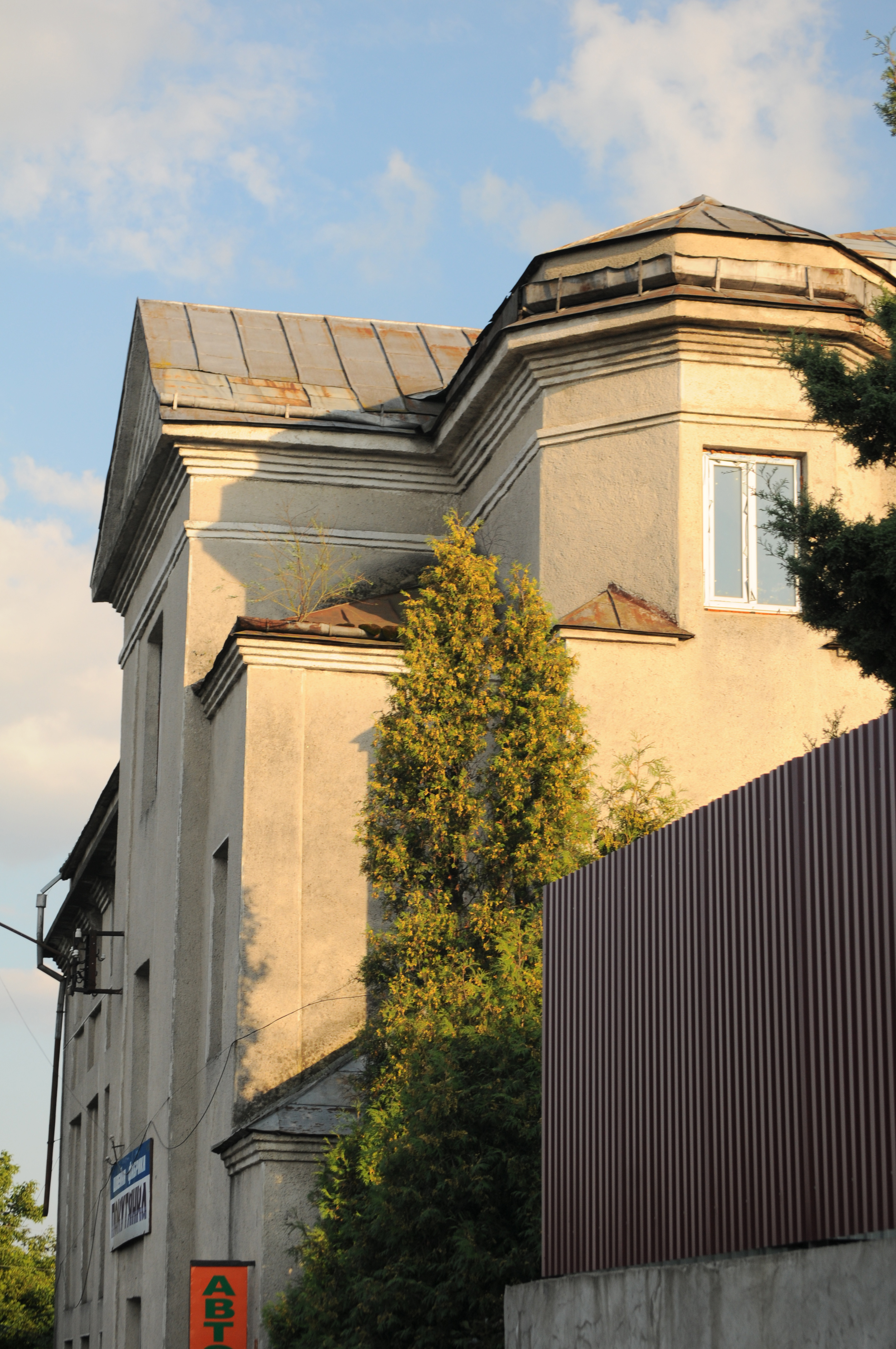
Sniatyn Synagogue

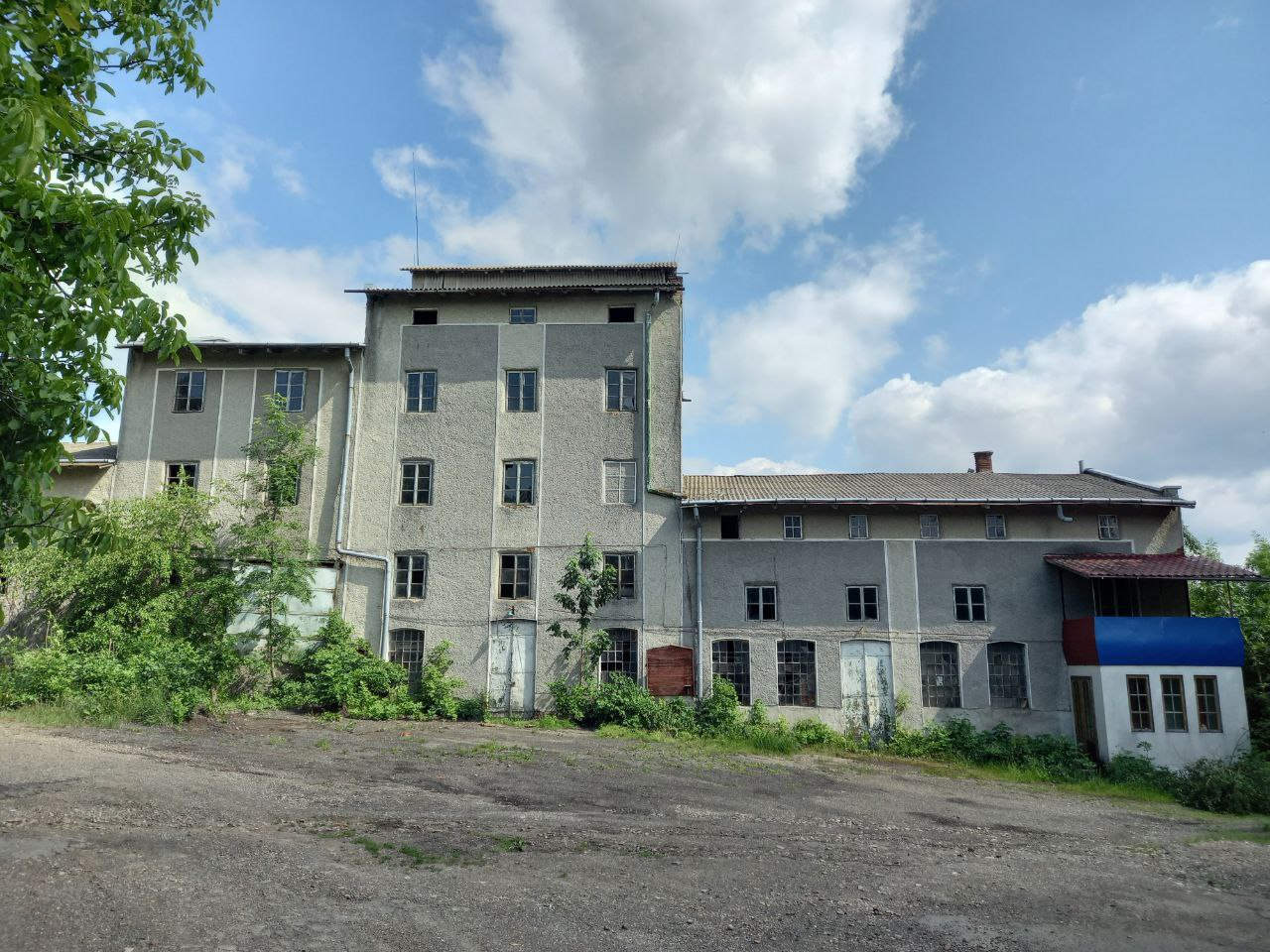
Watermill in Mykulyntsi

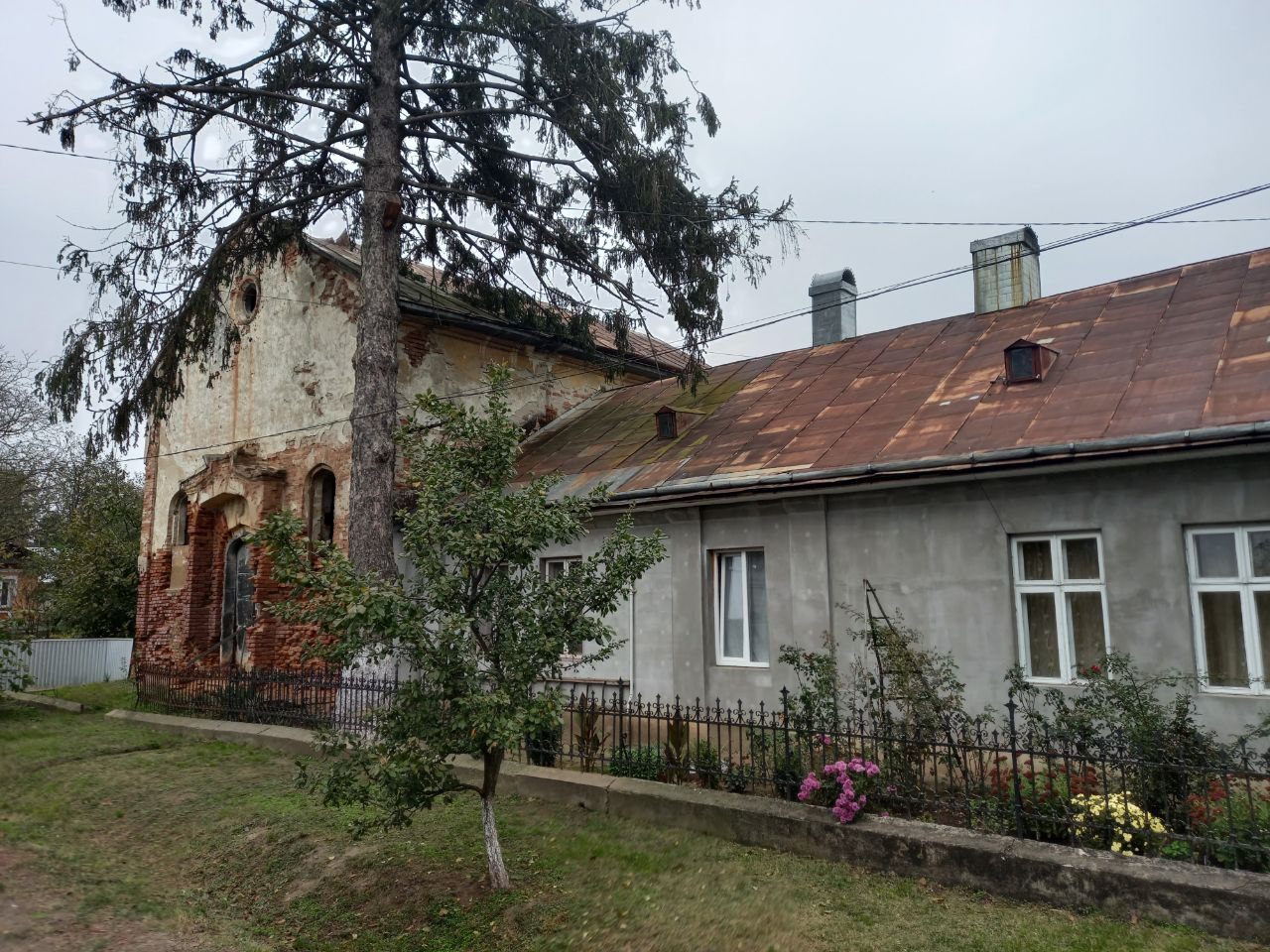
Former Evangelical church in Augustdorf

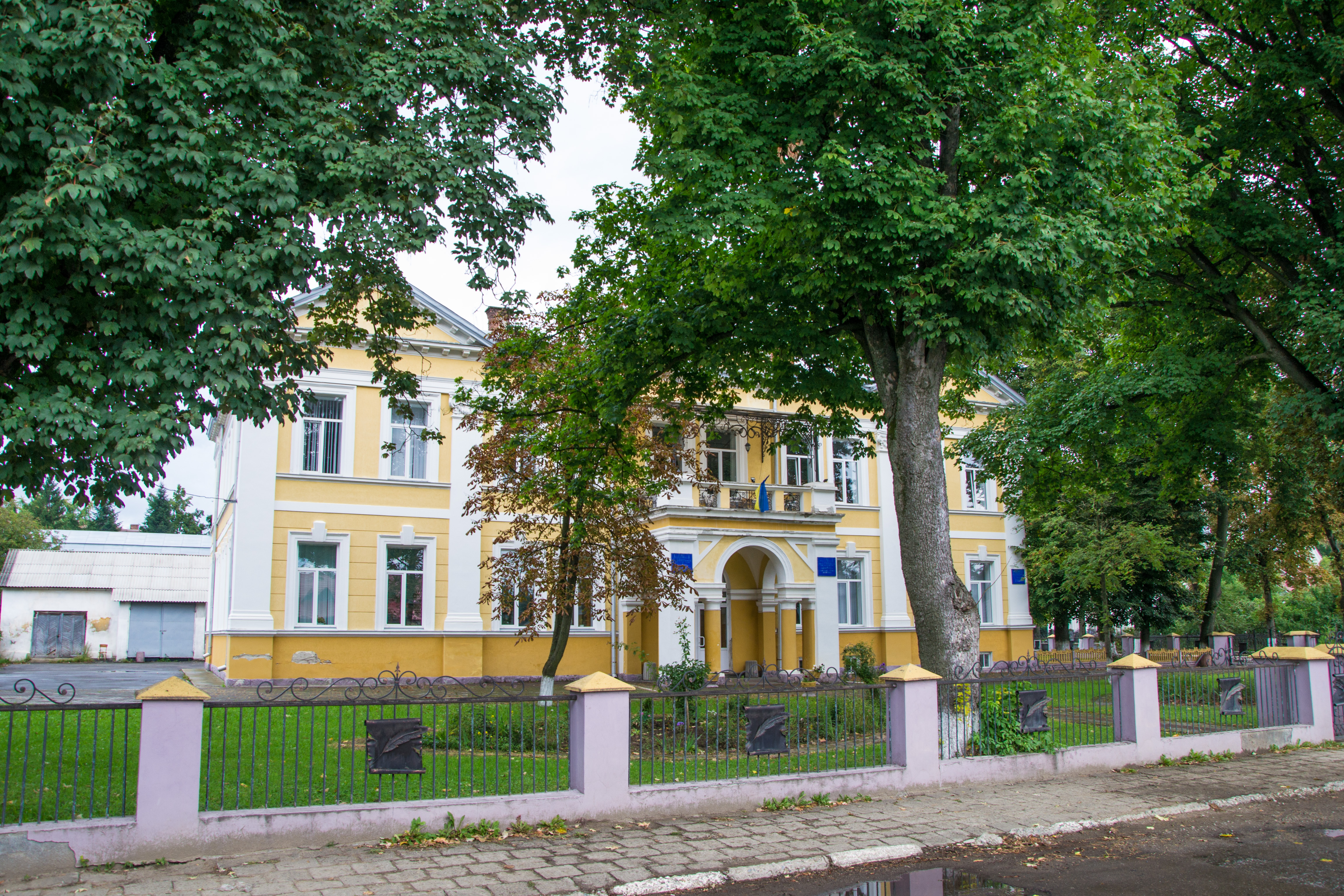
Former County Council building

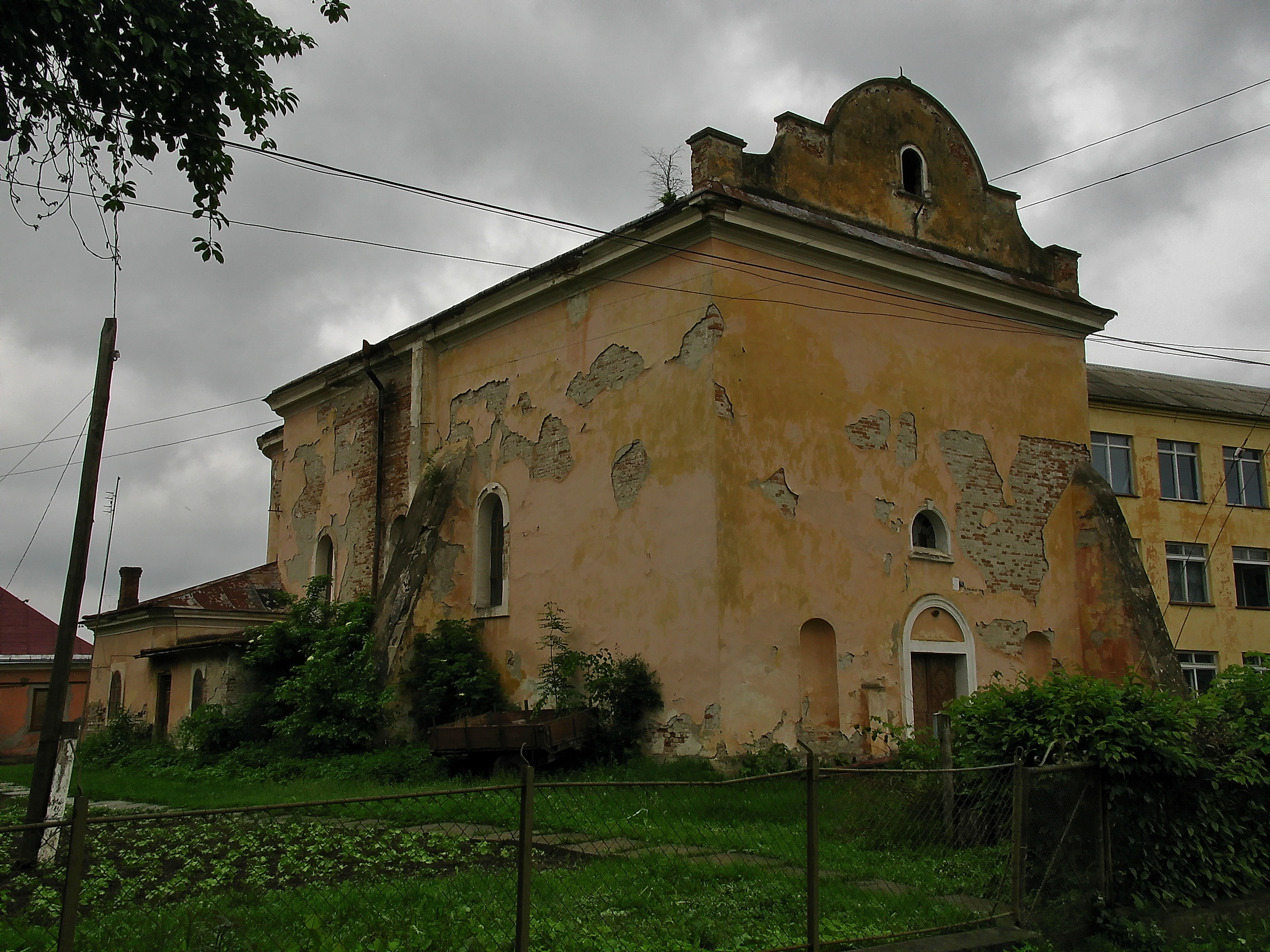
Armenian Church

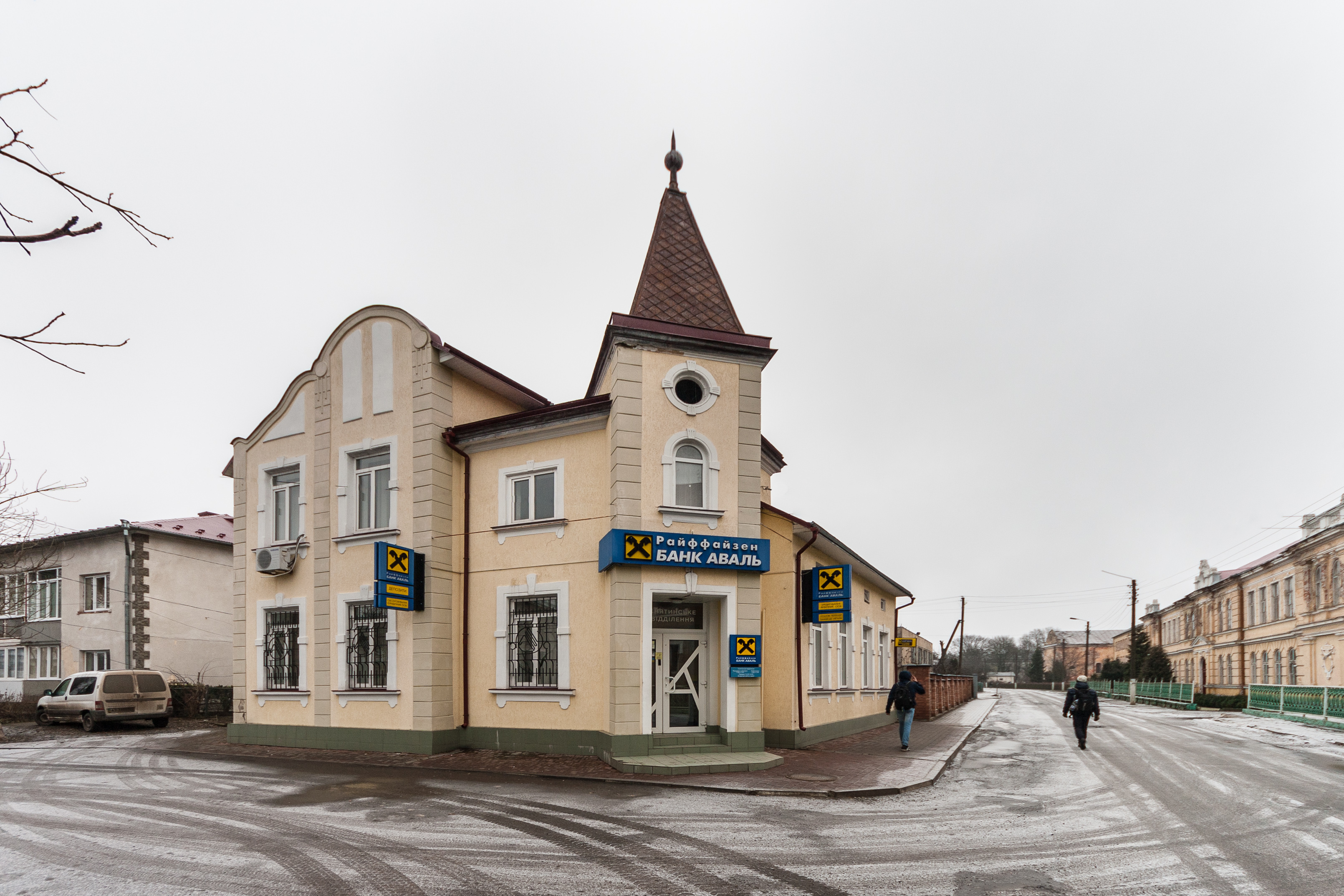
Ignacy Schmitzler's photo studio

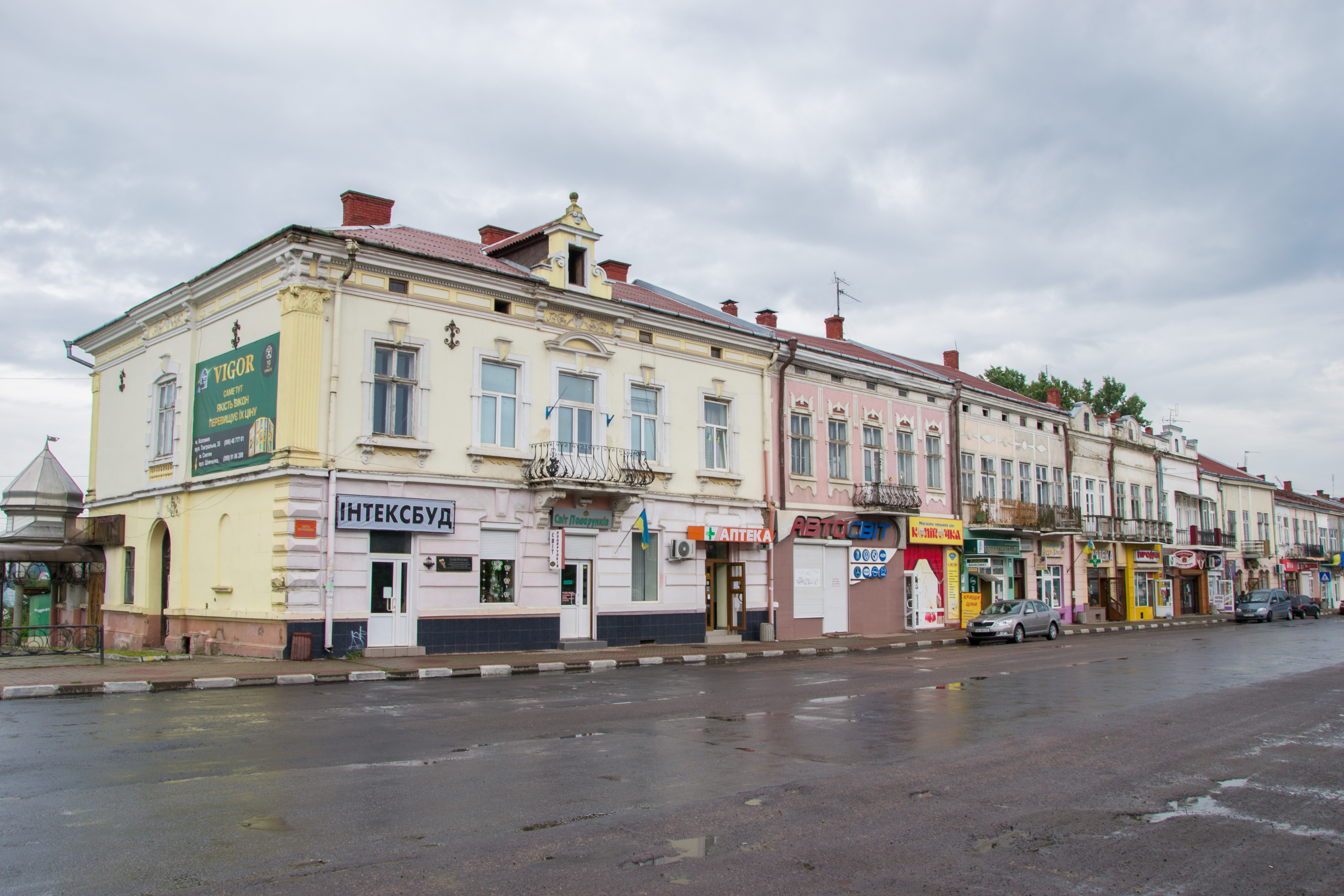
Historic city center (Shevchenka Street)
