= Maksym Yemets =

Ukrainian poet, soldier (1994–2025)

- Native name: Максим Михайлович Ємець
- Nickname: Yenot (Єнот)
- Born: Maksym Mykhailovych Yemets; 21 September 1994; Staryi Kosiv, now Ivano-Frankivsk Oblast, Ukraine
- Died: 4 February 2025 (aged 30) Donetsk Oblast, Ukraine
- Allegiance: Ukraine
- Branch: Ukrainian Air Force
- Rank: Major
- Conflicts: Russo-Ukrainian War
- Awards: Order of the Gold Star; Order for Courage
- Alma mater: Ivano-Frankivsk Stepan Hranat Financial and Commercial College, Odesa Military Academy, Yevhen Berezniak Military Diplomatic Academy

Maksym Yemets (Ukrainian: Максим Михайлович Ємець; call sign "Yenot"; 21 September 1994 – 4 February 2025) was a Ukrainian poet, soldier, Major of the Armed Forces of Ukraine, and a participant in the Russian-Ukrainian war. He was a recipient of the Order for Courage, 3rd class (2022) and was awarded the title of Hero of Ukraine (2025, posthumously).

== Biography ==
Maksym Yemets was born on 21 September 1994, in Staryi Kosiv, now part of the Kosiv Hromada in the Kosiv Raion of Ivano-Frankivsk Oblast, Ukraine.

In his childhood, he participated in military-patriotic organizations, including UNA-UNSO and the Stepan Bandera Trident. Later, he was a member of the "Narodnyi Kontrol" public movement.

Maksym was raised by his mother, Nadiia Yemets, his grandmother, Mariia Yemets, and his grandfather, Valentyn Yemets.

He studied at the Kosiv boarding gymnasium and later at the Ivano-Frankivsk Stepan Hranat Financial and Commercial College.

Yemets was on the front lines from the beginning of the Russian-Ukrainian war. He first served in the Aidar Battalion, and from 4 August 2014, he was a gunner-operator in the 54th reconnaissance battalion. He participated in the battles for Ilovaisk and Debaltseve as part of the 10th Mountain Assault Brigade and 24th Mechanized Brigade.

In 2018, after completing leadership courses at the Odesa Military Academy, he was commissioned as a "junior lieutenant".

He was serving as a commander of a reconnaissance company in the 24th Mechanized Brigade named after King Danylo at the time of the full-scale invasion. He fought in the battles for Popasna.

On 8 March 2022, during the first days of the defense of Popasna, he was severely wounded with a punctured lung and the loss of part of his stomach.

On 1 June 2022, he became the commander of a motorized infantry battalion of the 10th Mountain Assault Brigade "Edelweiss". At that time, he was fighting in Sievierodonetsk. After defending Sievierodonetsk, he transferred to a combined-arms unit of the Main Directorate of Intelligence of the Ministry of Defense (HUR). There, he took part in operations on various fronts. He contributed to the planning and execution of military operations to liberate Kharkiv Oblast, including the Balakliia breakthrough and the de-occupation of Kupiansk in 2022.

He was wounded several times and had a disability status.

He participated in the planning and execution of the defense of Kharkiv Oblast in 2024, where he commanded defensive operations, particularly in the village of Starytsia. There, HUR, along with units of the 42nd Mechanized Brigade, defeated the enemy, preventing the occupiers from advancing further.

He continued his studies and in the summer of 2024, he was a student at the Yevhen Berezniak Military Diplomatic Academy.

From December 2024, he was in the Pokrovsk direction. He worked on organizing and coordinating military defense operations, specifically on the outskirts of Pokrovsk and Pishchane. Thanks to the coordinated actions of the 425th Assault Regiment "Skala" and the 32nd Mechanized Brigade, the village of Pishchane was liberated.

He was killed on 4 February 2025, in the Pokrovsk direction in Donetsk Oblast by artillery shelling. In memory of her beloved, Oksana Rubaniak promised to publish his collection of poems.

The funeral took place on 11 February 2025, in Ivano-Frankivsk. He was buried at the Alley of Heroes in the city cemetery in the village of Chukalivka.

== Personal life ==
In October 2018, Maksym Yemets married Tetiiana Petriv, and in November 2019, their daughter Kvitoslava was born. The couple divorced in February 2023.

Maksym was engaged to Ukrainian poet, writer, public activist, servicewoman, and company commander of the Armed Forces of Ukraine, Oksana Rubaniak.

== Creativity ==
In 2025, a posthumous collection of poems, "Nashe ratne dilo ta rozdumy pro vichne", by Maksym Yemets was published. His fiancée, Oksana Rubaniak, known as "Ksena", worked on the collection.

== Awards ==
- Hero of Ukraine with the award of the "Golden Star" order (2025, posthumously)
- Order for Courage, 3rd class (13 March 2022)
- Medal For Military Service to Ukraine (2 November 2016)
- Medal for Cross of Combat Merit (posthumously)

== Bibliography ==
- Yemets Maksym Mykhailovych / A. I. Shushkivskyi // Encyclopedia of Modern Ukraine [Online] / Eds. : I. М. Dziuba, A. I. Zhukovsky, M. H. Zhelezniak [et al.] ; National Academy of Sciences of Ukraine, Shevchenko Scientific Society. – Kyiv : The NASU institute of Encyclopedic Research, 2025.
