= Mariia Hryniuk =

Ukrainian art historian and ceramist (born 1959)

- Марія Миколаївна Гринюк
- Born: 24 November 1959 (age 66); Staryi Kosiv (now Ivano-Frankivsk Oblast, Ukraine)
- Education: Kosiv School of Folk Arts and Crafts, Lviv Institute of Applied and Decorative Arts
- Occupations: Art historian, master of artistic ceramics, public figure
- Awards: Merited Figure of Arts of Ukraine

Mariia Hryniuk (Ukrainian: Марія Миколаївна Гринюк; born 24 November 1959) is a Ukrainian art historian, master of artistic ceramics, public figure. The candidate of art history (1997), docent (2004). Member of the National Union of Artists of Ukraine (1995).

== Biography ==
Mariia Hryniuk was born on 24 November 1959 in Staryi Kosiv (now Kosiv Hromada, Kosiv Raion, Ivano-Frankivsk Oblast, Ukraine).

Her first drawing teacher was the ceramist Vasyl Aronets, who directed her attention to ceramics. In 1979, she graduated from the Kosiv School of Folk Arts and Crafts, and in 1984 from the Lviv Institute of Applied and Decorative Arts (teachers: Karlo Zvirynskyi, Vitold Manastyrskyi, Emmanuil Mysko). After graduation, she worked as a lecturer, docent at the Department of History and Theory of Art, deputy director for academic work, and from 2001 to 2006 was the rector of the Kosiv Institute of Decorative Arts. She is currently working as an artist.

She heads the charity organization "Avtentychna Hutsulshchyna". She is the founder of the "Maliovanyi Dzbanyk" festival. She is the initiator and author of the project of the "Dzban" cultural and art center, which is currently under construction in Staryi Kosiv. In 2019, on her initiative, Kosiv painted ceramics was included in the UNESCO Intangible Cultural Heritage Lists.

== Works ==
Among his works:

- book "Na dalekii polonyni" (1997, author Anzej Polza; co-author Mariia Hryniuk);
- project "Halereia maistriv Hutsulshchyny" (it includes research publications by Mariia Matiichuk (2006), "Vohniane dyvo Romana Strynadiuka", "Obraznyi svit Valentyny Dzhuraniuk" (2013);
- bibliographic reference book "Oleksii Solomchenko" (1999, compiler);
- booklets "Avtentyka i chas" (2002), "Kosivshchyna mystetska" (2003).
- publication "Narodni promysly i profesiine mystetstvo v konteksti vyshchoi rehionalnoi khudozhnoi shkoly".

== Creativity ==
From 1986, she has been presenting her works at regional, national and international exhibitions. In the same year, a personal exhibition of the artist took place in Kosiv. Her works trace the traditions of Hutsul ceramics (table sets, decorative dishes and vases, and three-dimensional compositions).

Among the important works:

- Table set "Kosmatskyi" (1985);
- Vase for interior "Tsvit paporoti" (1998);
- Wall plates – "Horikhovyi lyst", "Khryzantemy", "Kvitу na sviato" (all – 2000);
- Three-dimensional ceramic composition "Khrystos voskres" (2002).

== Awards ==
- Merited Figure of Arts of Ukraine (8 November 2019);
- Certificates of Honor from the Ministry of Education and Science of Ukraine, the National Union of Journalists of Ukraine, the Cabinet of Ministers of Ukraine, and others.
