= Battle of Kosmach =

- Part of the anti-Soviet resistance by the Ukrainian Insurgent Army during World War II
Date	30 January – 5 February 1945
Location	Kosmach, Kosiv Raion, Stanislav Oblast
Result	Ukrainian victory

Belligerents
Soviet Union	Ukraine

Commanders and leaders
Aleksey Dergachev †	Myroslav Symsych; Pavlo Vatsyk

Units involved
Ministry of the Internal Affairs: NKVD; 31st Frontier Detachment; 33rd Frontier Detachment; 87th Frontier Detachment; 256th Regiment	Western Operational Group: 4th Operational Group “Hoverla”; Unit “Skazheni”; Unit “Hutsulskyi”; Unit “Haydamaky”; Unit “Pidkarpatskyi”

Strength
2,000 men	1,200 men

Casualties and losses
386–450 killed	6–12 killed

The Battle of Kosmach (Ukrainian: Бої під Космачем; 30 January — 5 February, 1945) was fought between the 31st, 33rd, 87th Frontier Detachments, 256th Regiment of the NKVD in the Ministry of the Internal Affairs of the Soviet Union under the command of Aleksey Dergachev against the Armed Units “Skazheni”, “Hutsulskyi”, “Haydamaky” and “Pidkarpatskyi” of the 4th Operational Group “Hoverla” in the Western Operational Group of the Ukrainian Insurgent Army under the command of Myroslav Symsych and Pavlo Vatsyk in the Kosiv Raion of the Stanislav Oblast.

== Battle ==
The village of Kosmach was capital of «Kosmach republic», territories in Stanislav region that were controlled by ukrainian militants until 1946. On January 30, the Soviet command pulled border troops 31, 33 and 87 and some other Soviet formations to the rebel-controlled village of Kosmach in order to capture the «Banderite capital» nicknamed by the Enkavedists. On the same day, the offensive began. The UPA fighters, seeing the attacking enemies, were in no hurry to go into battle, but retreated to the surrounding forests. Soviets decided to engage in terror against civilians. However, after a few hours, the Upa soldiers returned to the village and opened fire on the enemies. The battle lasted continuously for three days.

The commander of the NKVD unit , Lieutenant Colonel O. T. Dergachev, who had previously fought in the Winter War, and participated in mass deportations of Crimean Tatars to Central Asia, was killed in the clash on February 3, according to Russian sources.
