= Sheshory =

Village in Ivano-Frankivsk Oblast, Ukraine

Sheshory Шешори
- Village
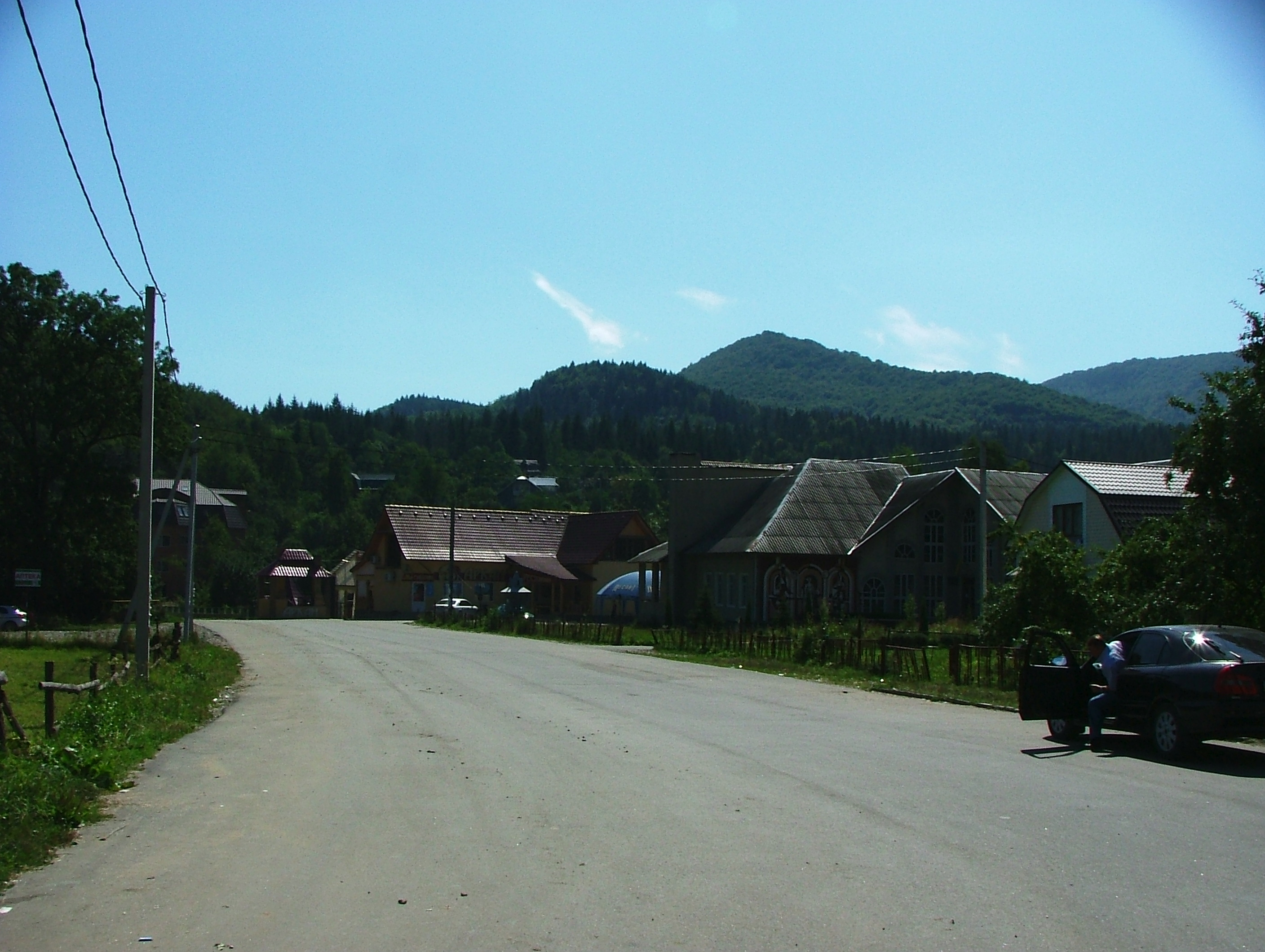

- Location of Sheshory in Ivano-Frankivsk Oblast Location of Sheshory in Ukraine
- Coordinates: 48°20′11″N 24°59′28″E
- Country: Ukraine
- Oblast: Ivano-Frankivsk Oblast
- Raion: Kosiv Raion
- Hromada: Kosiv urban hromada
- First mentioned: 1427 or 1445

Population (2020)
  - Total: 2,116

Sheshory (Ukrainian: Шешори; Polish: Szeszory) is a village in Kosiv urban hromada, Kosiv Raion, in Ukraine's western Ivano-Frankivsk Oblast. Its population is 2,116 (as of 2020).

== Overview ==
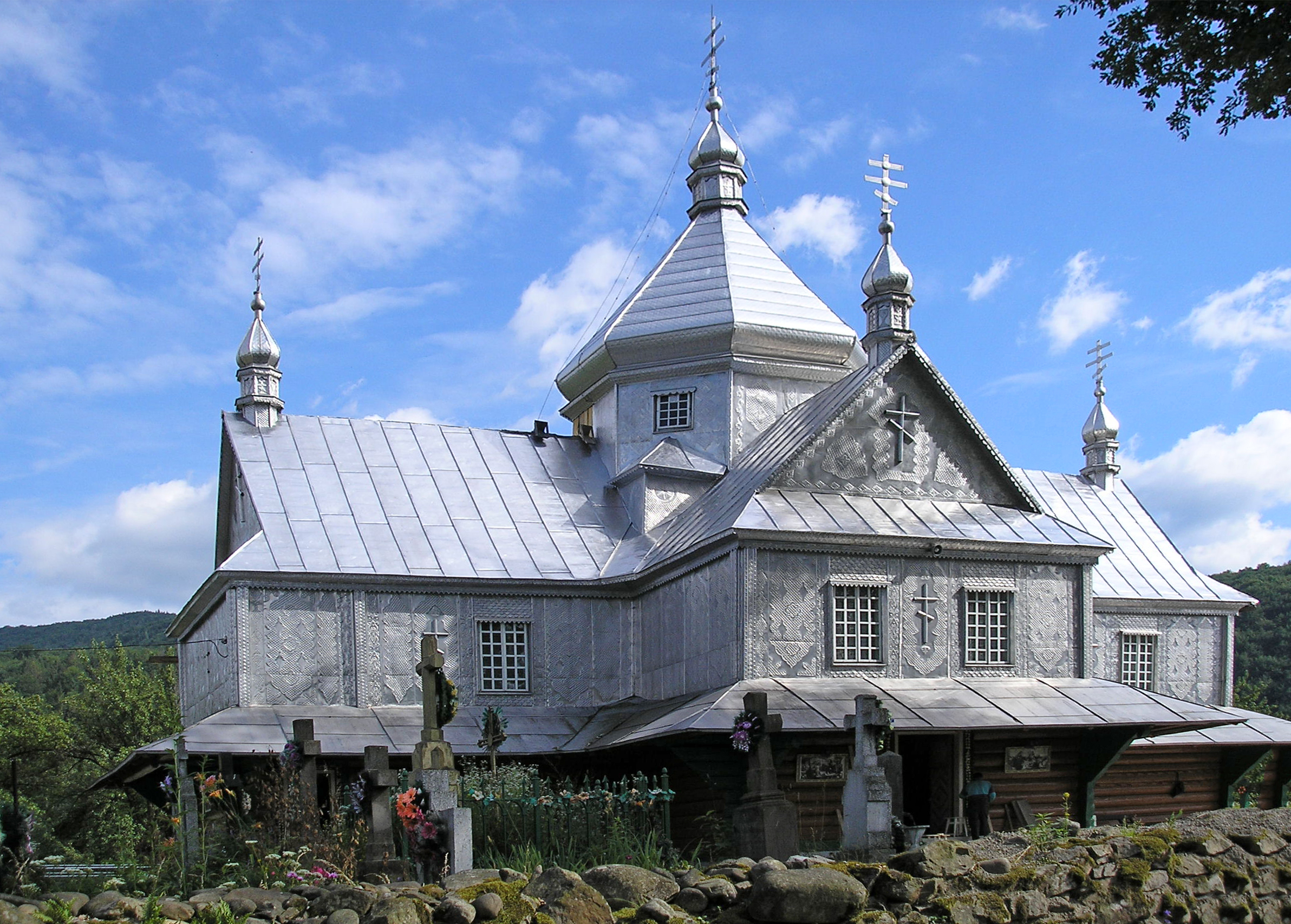
Saint Paraskeva's Church

Sheshory was first mentioned in 1427 or 1445, although evidence of human settlement in the village dates to the Stone Age. The village is located near the Pistynka river, and several waterfalls are located near the village. A sanatorium and tourist resort both exist in the village.

The village is inhabited by Hutsuls, and contains Horishnia Tserkva, one of the oldest Hutsul churches. A narodnyi dim was founded in 1924, and the wooden Church of the Holy Great Martyr Paraskeva of Sunday continues to stand. Sheshory was the site of a battle on 20 October 1950, during the anti-Soviet resistance by the Ukrainian Insurgent Army. As a result of the battle, two commanders of the Ukrainian Insurgent Army (Vasyl Savchak and Hryhorii Lehkyi) were killed.

A monument to the writer, poet, and artist Taras Shevchenko, created by Ivan Honchar, was opened by Viacheslav Chornovil in his capacity as a Komsomol worker on 8 August 1965. As a result of the speech Chornovil gave during the opening of the monument, he was removed from the Komsomol. A plaque commemorating the speech is placed at the bottom of the monument. Another monument, to the writer and poet Ivan Franko, was erected in the village on 13 August 1995.

== Notable people ==
- Ksenia Danylyshyn, songwriter
- Oleh Haborak, soldier of the Armed Forces of Ukraine killed during the War in Donbas
- Volodymyr Oleksiuk, philosopher
- Hanna Vasylashchuk, weaver
- Oleksandra Vasylashchuk, writer
- Myroslav Yakibchuk, trade unionist and politician
