= Staryi Kosiv =

Rural locality in Ivano-Frankivsk Oblast, Ukraine

Staryi Kosiv Старий Косів
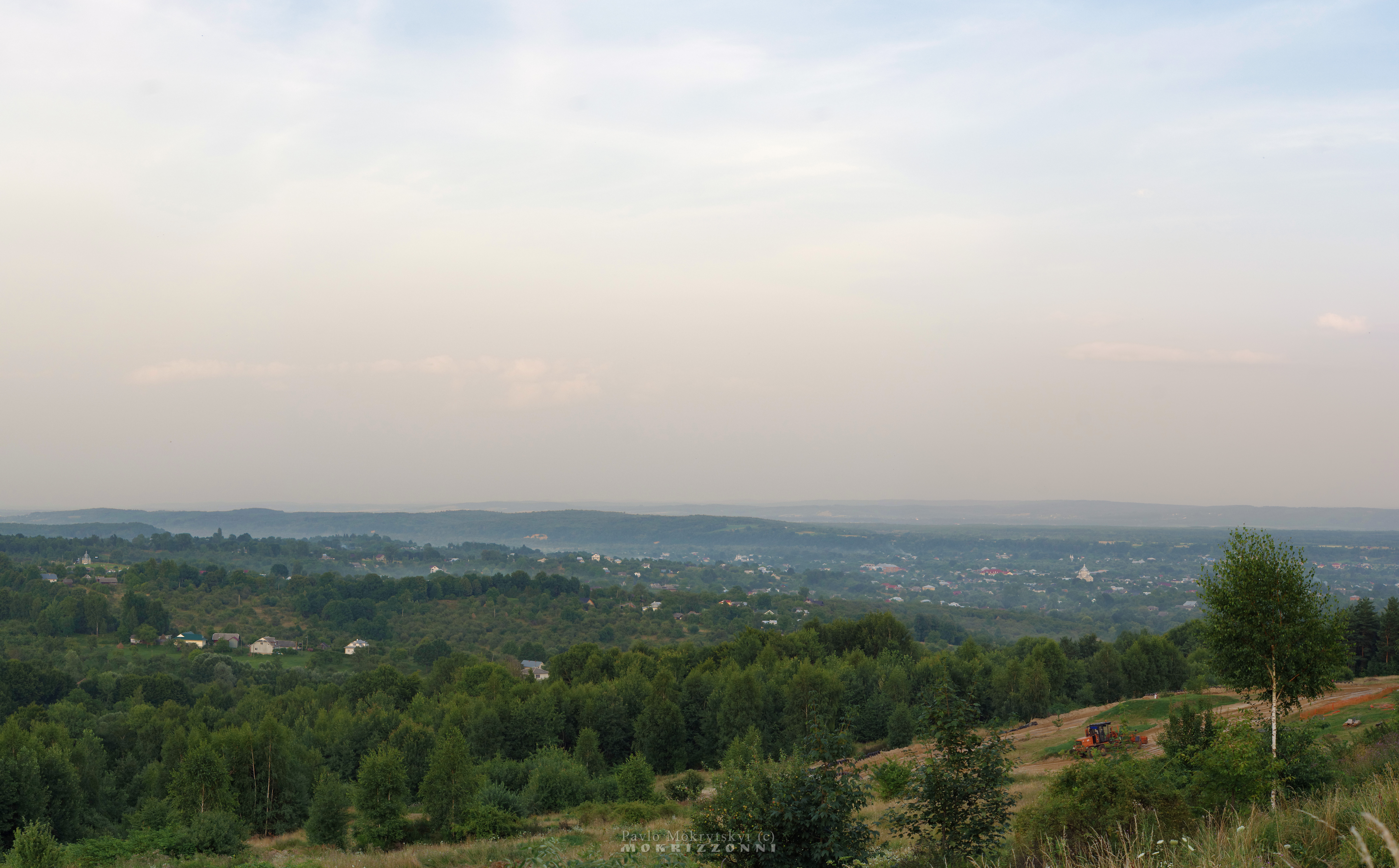
- Panorama of the village of Stary Kosiv from the ascent from Kosiv to the village of Pistyn

- Location in Ivano-Frankivsk Oblast Staryi Kosiv (Ukraine)
- Coordinates: 48°19′21″N 25°7′51″E
- Country: Ukraine
- Oblast: Ivano-Frankivsk Oblast
- Raion: Kosiv Raion
- Hromada: Kosiv urban hromada
- Time zone: UTC+2 (EET)
  - Summer (DST): UTC+3 (EEST)
- Postal code: 78606

Staryi Kosiv (Ukrainian: Старий Косів; Polish: Kosów Stary) is a village in the Kosiv urban hromada of the Kosiv Raion of Ivano-Frankivsk Oblast in Ukraine.

== History ==
It was first mentioned in 1318.

On 19 July 2020, as a result of the administrative-territorial reform and liquidation of the Kosiv Raion, the village became part of the Kosiv Raion.

== Notable residents ==
- Mariia Hryniuk (born 1959), Ukrainian art historian, master of artistic ceramics, public figure
- Maksym Yemets (1994–2025), Ukrainian poet, soldier. Hero of Ukraine (2025, posthumously)
