= Pistyn =

Rural locality in Ivano-Frankivsk Oblast, Ukraine

Pistyn Пістинь
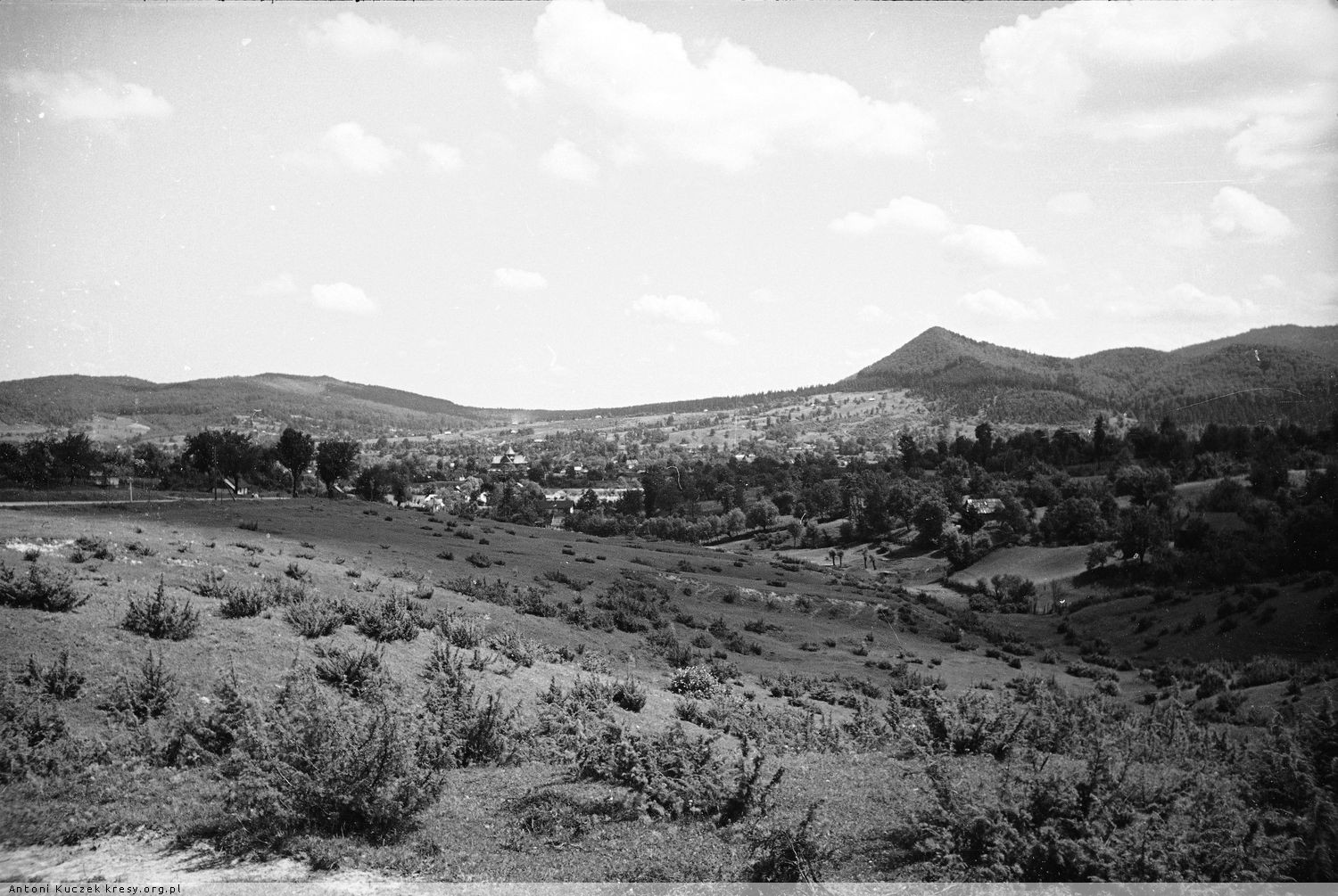
- A view of Pistyn in 1938

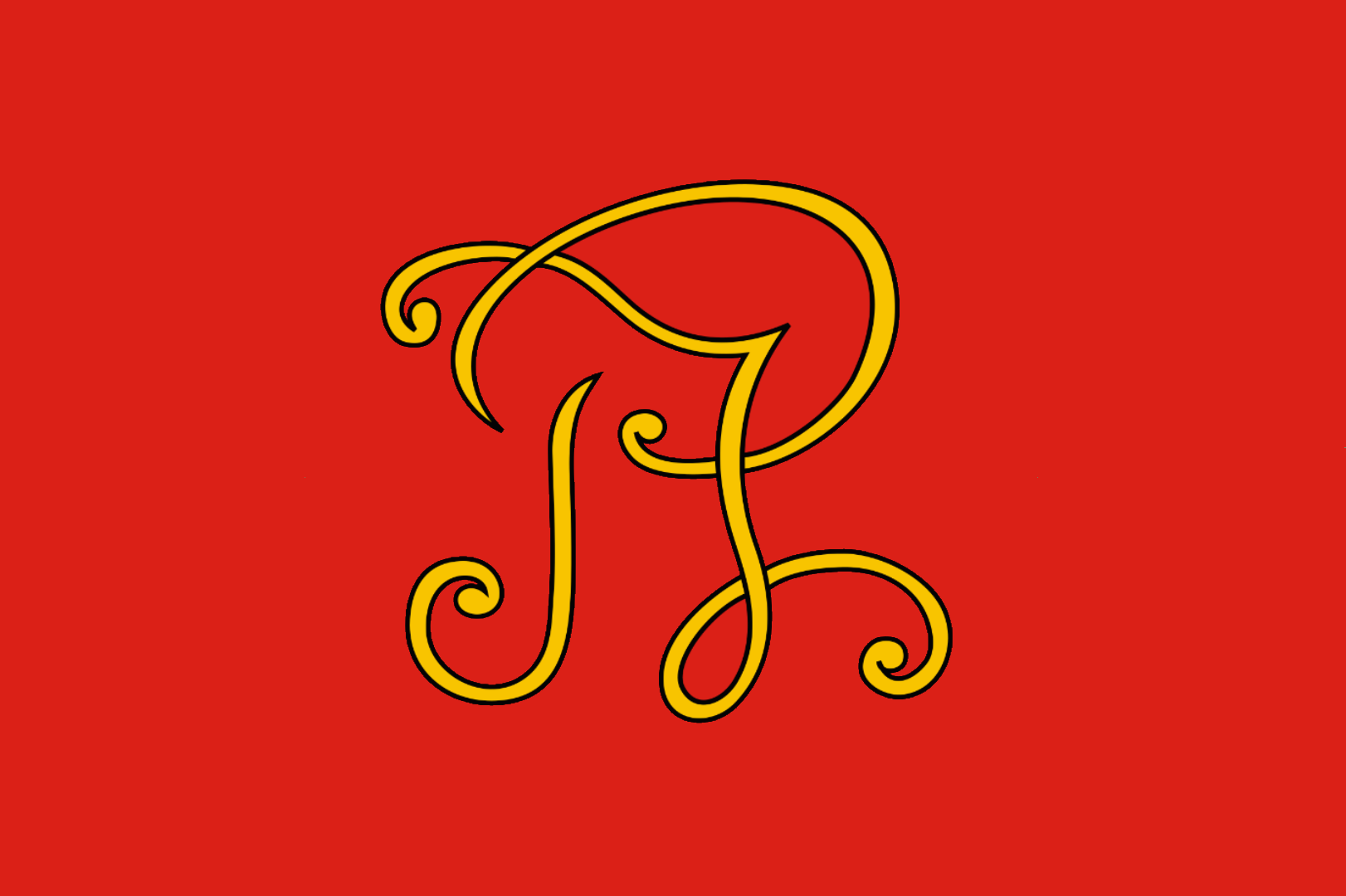
- Flag Coat of arms

- Location in Ivano-Frankivsk Oblast Pistyn (Ukraine)
- Coordinates: 48°21′42″N 25°1′28″E
- Country: Ukraine
- Oblast: Ivano-Frankivsk Oblast
- Raion: Kosiv Raion
- Hromada: Kosiv urban hromada
- Time zone: UTC+2 (EET)
  - Summer (DST): UTC+3 (EEST)
- Postal code: 78633

Pistyn (Ukrainian: Пістинь; Polish: Pistyń) is a village in the Kosiv urban hromada of the Kosiv Raion of Ivano-Frankivsk Oblast in Ukraine.

== History ==
The first written mention of Pistyn appears in 1375 and is related to clarifying the ownership rights of the salt springs located there. In 1416, King Władysław II Jagiełło confirmed the granting of the village of Pistyn (Pyestina) to Vasylko Teptukovych. The tax register of 1515 documented 4 lany (about 100 hectares) of cultivated land and another 3 lany that were temporarily free.

On 19 July 2020, as a result of the administrative-territorial reform and liquidation of the Kosiv Raion, the village became part of the Kosiv Raion.

== Religion ==
- Church of the Dormition (1861, wooden)

== Notable residents ==
- Petro Koshak (1864–1940), Ukrainian master of Kosiv painted ceramics

== Bibliography ==
- "Pistyń". Geographical Dictionary of the Kingdom of Poland (in Polish). 8. Warszawa: Kasa im. Józefa Mianowskiego. 1887. p. 231.
- "Pistyń". Geographical Dictionary of the Kingdom of Poland (in Polish). p. 455.
