= Kosmach =

Rural locality in Ivano-Frankivsk Oblast, Ukraine

Kosmach Космач Kosmacz
- Village
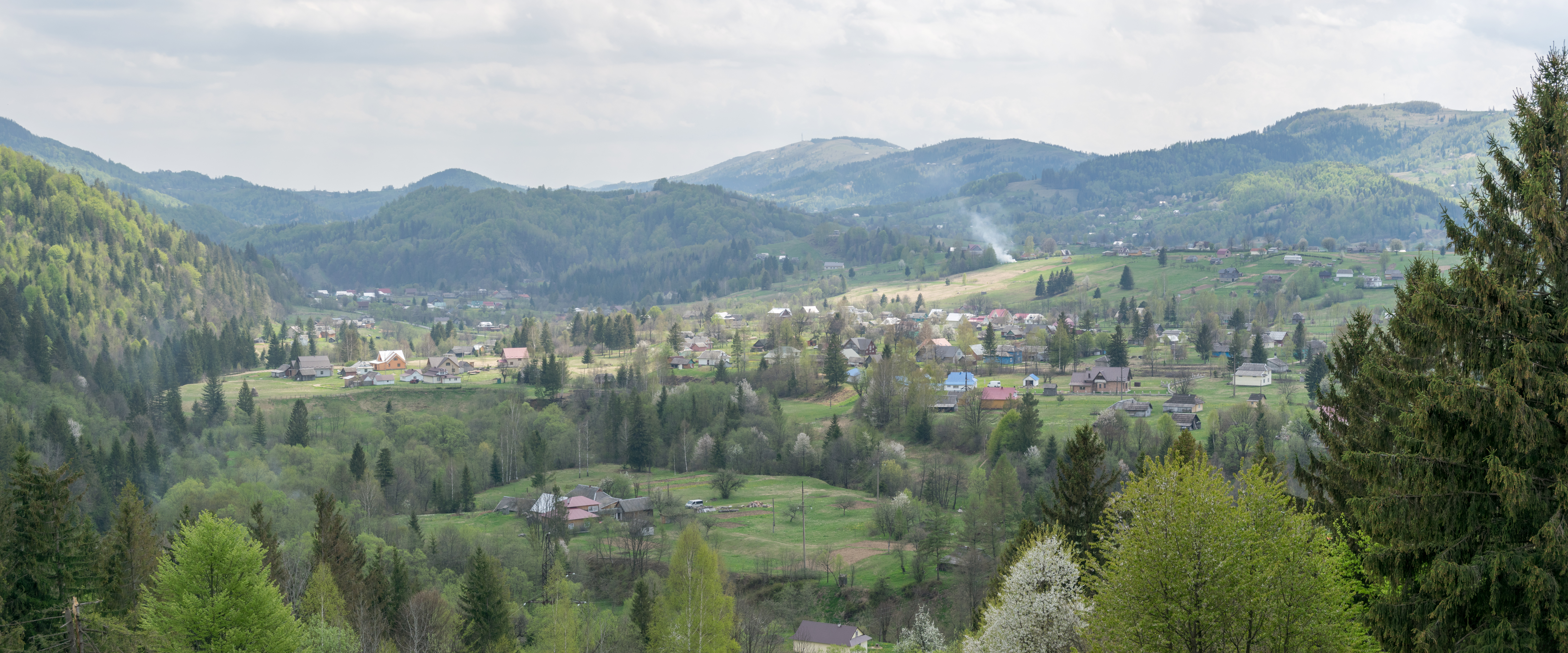
- Kosmach panorama in May 2020.

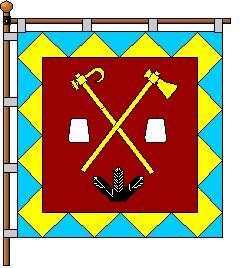
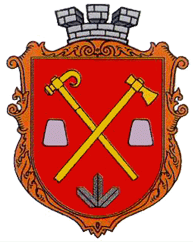
- Flag Coat of arms

- Location of Kosmach in Ivano-Frankivsk Oblast Location of Kosmach in Ukraine
- Coordinates: 48°19′51″N 24°48′48″E
- Country: Ukraine
- Oblast: Ivano-Frankivsk Oblast
- Raion: Kosiv Raion
- Hromada: Kosmach rural hromada

Kosmach (Ukrainian: Космач; Polish: Kosmacz) is a village located in Kosiv Raion, Ivano-Frankivsk Oblast, Ukraine. It hosts the administration of Kosmach rural hromada, one of the hromadas of Ukraine. The village was formed in 1427. (Note: The first written mention dates back to 1412, though these lands were under the rule of Poland and were owned by the Yablonsky landowners. https://travels.in.ua/en-US/locality/28385/kosmach-village) It has 6,054 inhabitants.

== Soviet rule ==
In 1939, Kosmach, like the whole of Eastern Galicia, was captured by the Red Army. After 73 years of existence, the self-governing community of Kosmach, Kolomyia district, was transformed into a village council. Stalinist repressions affected the fate of hundreds of Kosmach residents. People's resistance against the terror of the occupiers grew. During the Second World War, the forces of the Ukrainian Insurgent Army were firmly entrenched in Kosmach. At the end of September 1943, the UNS "Skuby" unit gained a victorious success in the fight against the Germans. The crew organized an ambush of four German trucks on the road between Kosmach and Kolomyia. In the crossfire, the Nazis lost up to seventy people killed, according to Ukrainian data. On 5 October 1943, soldiers of the UPA training camp fought with the Germans in the Polanytsia, Kutariv, Yavirnyk and Kucharky meadows. The enemy retreated, leaving 20 killed and 20 wounded.

In January–February 1945, there was a battle against the Soviet Union.
