= The Stone Cross (film) =

1968 film by Leonid Osyka

- Directed by: Leonid Osyka
- Written by: Vasyl Stefanyk
- Screenplay by: Ivan Drach
- Produced by: Dovzhenko Film Studios
- Starring: Daniil Ilchenko; Boryslav Brondukov; Konstantin Stepankov; Ivan Mykolaichuk; Vasyl Symchych
- Cinematography: Valery Kvas
- Music by: Volodymyr Huba
- Release date: June 10, 1968 (USSR)
- Running time: 82 minutes
- Country: USSR
- Languages: Ukrainian, Russian

The Stone Cross (Ukrainian: «Камінний хрест», romanized: Kaminnyi Khrest; Russian: «Каменный крест», romanized: Kamenny Krest) is a 1968 Soviet Ukrainian drama film. Directed by Leonid Osyka, it is based on Vasyl Stefanyk's short stories The Thief and The Stone Cross.

It has been ranked 5th in the list of the 100 best films in the history of Ukrainian cinema.

In 2009 began the digital restoration of this film.

== Plot ==
In the 1890s, Ivan, a Galician peasant in a desperate attempt to get his family out of poverty decides to leave his ancestral home and emigrate to Canada. On the eve of his departure a thief gets into his house. The village judges sentence the thief to death. The departure for Canada being tantamount to his own death, Ivan holds a farewell party that feels like a funeral for him and his family. In his own memory he erects a stone cross on a hill.

Gradually, a conversation ensues between the audience, the owners are advised what punishment to apply, why they ask about the origin of the thief, where he came from and how he became a criminal. Ivan doubts whether he will do the right thing by killing a man who has committed a crime because of poverty. Gradually, the thief becomes bolder and agrees to accept the punishment, whatever it may be. Waiting for his death, he says goodbye to Ivan and kisses his hand. In the end, the owners drag the thief out of the house, although he is sincerely ready to accept death.

Ivan is preparing to leave his homeland with his sons and wife, but he is afraid that he will be forgotten, will disappear from people's memory like that thief. That's why he carves a fireplace cross in his memory. He drags him to the mountain, which he cared for years, and after descending, he says goodbye to his fellow villagers. Relatives and neighbors gather there, and Ivan's adult sons also arrive. Not everyone makes his decision, some reproach, indignant that Ivan will no longer be with them. Farewell reminds Ivan of his own funeral, he tries to cheer up those present. He thinks aloud that, in fact, the people of his homeland no longer need land, only money; the deepening chasm between the poor and the rich absorbs honesty and deprives one of confidence. Those present promise to remember Ivan and not to cross his cross. Disguised as his wife and sons in a suit, Ivan orders the musicians to play a cheerful melody.

Even before leaving, Ivan and his fellow villagers go on a procession and attend church. The words of the church service sound here like singing at the repose of John, and the cart with his belongings looks like a coffin. The family leaves with Ivan, he disappears over the horizon, and the fireplace cross remains a reminder of him.
