= The Stone Cross =

1900 novel by Vasyl Stefanyk

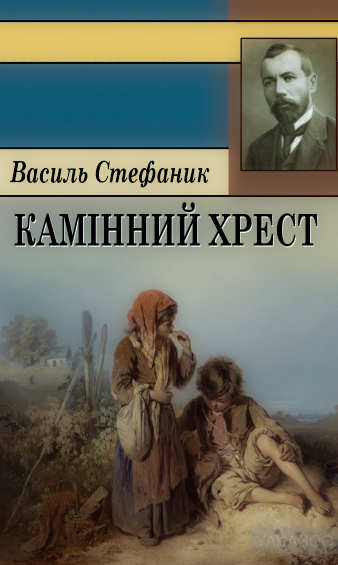
- Author: Vasyl Stefanyk
- Language: Ukrainian
- Genre: Psychological short story
- Published: 1900

The Stone Cross (Ukrainian: «Камі́нний хрест», romanized: Kaminnyi Hrest) is an epic psychological novel written in 1900 by Ukrainian writer Vasyl Stefanyk.

The story is dedicated to the farewell of emigrant peasants to their native land before leaving for Canada at the turn of the 19th and 20th centuries, after leaving the homeland of old Ivan Didukh. The author reveals the depressing feelings of the emigrant at the moment of his break with his native village and a piece of land, in the cultivation of which he invested all his life and must leave.

== Genre specifics ==
According to genre features, The Stone Cross is a short story. However, by analogy with many other works of the writer, it is called a novel. The author himself called his work a studio, i.e., an artistic study of the inner world of the protagonist. "The Stone Cross," in this case, is a study of the soul of a Ukrainian peasant worker, whose social circumstances force him to break the age-old connection with the soil where he grew up. The author emphasizes the diligence and virtue of the hero over other aspects of life. The desire to leave a memory - to put a stone cross on the hill - has a deep psychological connotation. Ivan Didukh puts a cross on his blood-soaked field and buries himself alive. However, he wants to live in the memory of his descendants, and he wants this cross to connect him to his native village both when he is far away in a foreign land and when he is not alive.

The work raises the problem of eternal connection with the native land; conscientious work on the land as a manifestation of national ethics and morality, as a duty, the only means and justification of the existence of the peasant; mass impoverishment of peasants, which caused a wave of emigration overseas.

== Plot ==
The novel is composed of seven chapters.

=== The first chapter ===
The first chapter serves as an exposure, which reveals the hero's background. The former mercenary Ivan Didukh, who had served 10 years in the imperial army, returned home and found only a dilapidated house and the worst part of the field on a barren sandhill, inherited from his dead parents. And even though Ivan brought the money from the army, with which he bought a good land and became owner, he still undertook to cultivate the mound, setting himself an ambitious goal: forcing this mound to produce bread. Ivan devoted his whole life to achieving this goal. Every year he harnessed himself next to a horse and took manure, covered the hill with sod so that the rains would not wash away the soil, and cultivated the field. He lost his strength in taking care of the hump, and the work bent him in an arc, for which Ivan was called Perelamaniy (broken) in the village. He denied himself everything he needed, went to church only on Easter, had lunch in a hurry, without even sitting at the table; trained chickens who did not dare to rake the manure because every small thing was destined for the hump, every minute of time was given to work. It is noticeable sаy that Ivan works on the hill, and his relatives cultivate other fields. Exhaustive work on a barren hill and a great desire to master it appear as a duel with a powerful opponent, like a duel of two giants: on the one hand, it is a hill, a "terrible giant"; on the other hand, he is an exhausted worker, a small man whose creative work turns a barren hill into a flowering field, and therefore Ivan's shadow on the hill in the rays of the setting sun looks like the shadow of a giant. Ivan transforms the embodiment of his dream, about which he says: "Oh no, God forbid, ran into an arc! But as long as he has no legs, he must give birth to bread!" The author's final words sound enthusiastic: "Such was Ivan, strange both in nature and in work."

=== The second chapter ===
In the second chapter, which serves as a tie, Ivan, finally succumbing to the persuasion of his sons, decides to emigrate to Canada. The reader is presented with pictures of Ivan's farewell to his fellow villagers, whom he invited to his household before leaving abroad. He thanked the people who came to say goodbye, treated them to vodka, and spoke kind words to them. He turned to Mikhail's godfather, Timothy's godmother, and shouted at the woman to cry less and watch the guests more. The writer avoids unnecessary descriptions, forcing the protagonist to reveal himself, makes maximum use of dialogues and monologues. Thus, he focuses on describing the emotional drama of the hero, who is compared to a stone that was thrown, albeit from a difficult, but native place. With stingy strokes, the author conveys the longing that tears the soul of the sаe hero: "He gritted his teeth like a millstone, threatened the woman with his fist like a bullet and beat in the chest."

=== The third chapter ===
In the third chapter, Ivan explains to people the reasons for his decision to leave, about how difficult it was for him because hard work has completely exhausted him, he does not have the strength to start a new life overseas. He was forced to agree because of the future of his sons, for whom there was no prospect in his native land. Neighbors comfort Ivan, emphasizing the complete hopelessness of the peasants: "This land is not worthy of restraining a few people and of enduring a few troubles. The man is not worthy, and she is not worthy", on the fact that soon he will have to leave himself. Ivan appreciates the support, but he cannot accept this situation calmly; when he has to leave the world in his old age from his native place, he is frightened by an unknown life, which for him is like death. He publicly apologizes to his wife Catherine for the wrongs he did to her during her married life, as before her death, because he does not know whether they will survive the crossing of the ocean or die on the way.

=== The fourth chapter ===
In the fourth chapter, Ivan addressed his fellow villagers with a request that as soon as the news of his death with his wife arrives, they should hold a memorial service for the repose of their souls and left the money to decent Jacob. People promised to comply with the request. Although he was a little ashamed, he decided to confess to the people about the sin he had almost committed the day before. He again remembered the hill on which he had great difficulty erecting a stone cross in memory of him and his wife on this land. Ivan confessed that he misses this hill the most, in which he put so much effort: "I spent my age on it and crippled by it. If I could, I would hide it in my bosom and take it with him into the world." Ivan admitted that in a moment of despair and inability to come to terms with the new trials of fate, he almost had committed suicide, going to hang himself on a pear, but remembered the hump, had run to his cross, where he resigned himself to the decision to go overseas. All of Ivan's thoughts are concentrated around the hill: he asked the neighbors not to pass him on Easter, to send one of the young people to sprinkle the cross with holy water. Consoling the godfather, Mykhailo said that people will always remember him because "you were a decent man, you didn't snore on anyone, you didn't plow or sift anyone, you didn't pound someone else's grain."

=== The fifth chapter ===
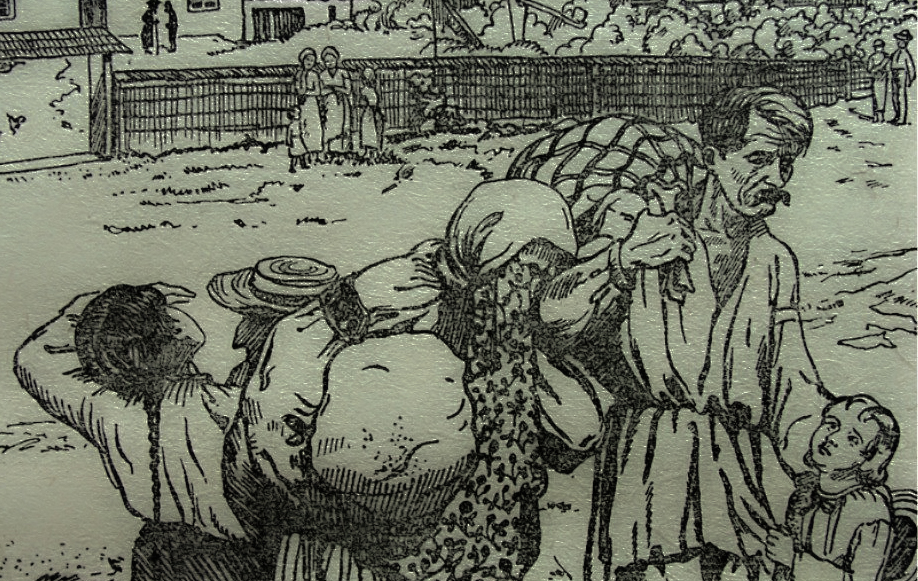
Ivan Didukh

The fifth chapter depicts how already well-drunk Ivan invited people to dances, games, and drink, and then the song sung by Ivan and Mykhailo burst into the noise of conversation, into the noise of music and dances. "The words of those songs are going, like yellow autumn leaves, which the wind drives across the frozen ground, and it stops again and again on each fair and trembles with torn shores, as before death." The farewell song resembled a kind of funeral.

=== The sixth chapter ===
The sixth chapter of the short story is the culmination. The son reminded his father that it was time to go to the railway track, but when he saw his father's eyes, he stepped back. Ivan and his wife changed into "lord's" clothes, a sudden change in the usual appearance of the characters, who were throwing off their peasant clothes as if leaving the world, caused a spooky reaction of people: "… The whole house cried. As if a cloud of weeping hung over the village, torn, as if human grief broke through the Danube dam - such was the weeping." In a sudden rush, Ivan began to dance with the wife of the last dance, from which "people got stuck," in which he poured out all the despair of farewell forever. The sons forcibly took their parents out of the house, but Ivan continued to dance outside by inertia, and Ivaniha (Ivan's wife) grabbed the threshold with her hands and told: "how deep she trampled that threshold out."

=== The seventh chapter ===
The final seventh chapter is the denouement. The whole village accompanied Ivan on the train; the fences on the road cracked and fell. Ivan, hunched over, danced in a frenzy until they compared to the hill. Seeing his stone cross, Ivan stopped and said to wife: "Do you see, old woman, our cross? Your name is also embossed there. Don't be afraid, and there are both mine and yours."

== Stylistic peculiarities ==
To embody his idea, the novelist resorts to a kind of plot-compositional organization of the text, at the same time operating with the poetics of expressionism, which is manifested in the artistic study of the meaning of suffering that motivates a man to know the essence of his existence; in the emotional sharpness of the portrayed, fragmentary, "nervous" dynamic-expressive phrase, intense drama of the situation. The lyrical flow that sounds in the farewell monologues of the hero, "the man's way of conversation is transferred alive," "excavations" in the confused human soul, pain, unfortunately, mental suffering determine the mood of the novel. Due to the narrower, concrete-historical problem of emigration, the author reveals in the work a much broader, eternal question of the sacred connection of man with his native land. Despite hard work, a strict ascetic way of life, Ivan was happy because he felt part of his native land, its owner, because he cared for it, revived it. The heroic duel of the peasant with much greater force ends with the victory of man, who transforms nature, forces to give birth to bread. The hero loved his hard work and his hump, which he turned into a fertile field because it filled his existence with meaning, gave him joy and harmony. Going abroad broke in his soul this connection with the world around him. Ivan Didukh perceives the departure as his own death, and because of this, he puts a cross on himself. An important role is given to artistic details that motivate the reader in his imagination to complete the image, often have a deep symbolic meaning, and carry super textual information. Such details are images of tense Ivan's veins, a thorn stuck in Ivan's heel, a trace of wheels, horse hooves, and Ivanov’s heels, a giant shadow of Ivan on the hill, an ancient song about autumn leaves, a spooky dance, etc.

=== Literary criticism ===
The novel "The Stone Cross" is a kind of artistic study of the soul of the main character Ivan Didukh, who is moving to Canada. Since returning from the army, people remember Ivan in exhausting work. Every year he harnessed himself next to a horse and took manure to his field on a stone hill. He covered the hill with sod so that the rains would not wash away the soil and cultivated the field. Labor bent him in an arc, and people began to call him Ivan Perelomanyi (Ivan-The-Broken-One) in the village.

The hero's confessions about his life are impressive. Monologues, which are an important means of his individualization, revolve primarily around the image of the hill on which Ivan Didukh erected a stone cross in memory of the village with embossed names - his and his wife. The image of the cross symbolizes the miserable fate of a peasant who worked hard all his life and was equally forced to leave his field because it was unable to feed him.

Describing the life story of the rural poor Ivan Didukh, who, as a result of all his superhuman efforts, was landless, the writer reflects the moral factors that create the spiritual essence of man, and above all - on the problem of connection with the native land.

The creators of the expressionist style revived the ancient truth that "you can't even pluck a flower without disturbing the stars," that the whole Universe is an inseparable whole. This is what the novel is about in the first place. Just as a stone is thrown into a pond disturbs the whole environment, so Ivan with a horse and cart at work "left behind traces of wheels, hooves and wide Ivan`s heels," shifting the environment, because the travel potion and tops swayed, nurtured for all sides behind the cart and dropped the dew on those tracks. It is also important that the wheels, horse hooves, and heels of Ivan create unity with their expressive movement, leaving traces.

Didukh and his family are experiencing a future crisis-torment of the unsuccessful struggle of all emigrants to preserve their spiritual identity. This premonition causes terrible pain. The author materializes it in the following way: "The whole house cried as if a cloud of weeping hanging over the village had broken." Here the house of Didukh`s loses the properties of a real object and becomes a sign of the mental state of the family.

== History of writing ==
The novel was written under the writer’s impressions from the mass emigration of the Galician peasantry overseas. Stefanyk, while studying in Krakow, witnessed the wanderings of his countrymen during transfers from one train to another. The reasons that led to the mass resettlement were the search for a better fate for the desperate peasants, who, despite their hard work, lost all hope of a dignified life in their country. During 1890–1910, more than 300,000 Ukrainians left Galicia, and up to 500 souls moved abroad from Rusov's native writer alone. The prototype of the protagonist was a fellow villager of the writer Stefan Didukh (in work - Ivan), who emigrated with his family to Canada. In a letter to Stefan Didukh's grandson M. Gavinchuk, dated February 11, 1935, V. Stefanyk mentioned his grandfather, who was a close friend of the writer's father, Semen Stefanyk:

He was very smart and calm, and was interested in public affairs, and was the first to set up a reading room in Rusov… With his children and grandchildren, he and many others left their native land… thoughts of your deceased grandfather in almost literal guidance. This is, so to speak, my debt paid to your grandfather in Ukrainian literature, and he, your grandfather, had a great influence in my youth.

The novel is based on a real fact: before leaving his native land, Stefan Didukh puts a stone cross in his field (which still stands in Rusov). But above all, it is a vivid image-type, which embodied the emotional dramas and the fate of many voluntary exiles from their homeland.

== The meaning and impact of the novel ==
The short story "The Stone Cross" is considered an excellent work of Ukrainian literature in terms of psychological penetration and mental strength, one of the first devoted to the exile of Ukrainian emigrants. The work had a significant impact on Ukrainian writers and the public in the early twentieth century. The writer Olha Kobylianska wrote to the author:

Between your words, there were great tears like pearls. You write terribly strongly… Your bitter, tearing, bloody poetry… which cannot be forgotten… I have already cried.

The story remains popular among former emigrants from Western Ukraine in Canada and the United States. The novella acquires a new (bitter) significance with the intensification ("4th wave") of Ukrainian emigration since the 1990s.

V. Stefanyk's "Stone Cross" is traditionally included in school curricula to study Ukrainian literature. In 1968, based on this story, film director Leonid Osyka created the film of the same name, which entered the treasury of the most prominent Ukrainian masterpieces.

== See also ==
- The Stone Cross (film)
- Ukrainian emigration
- Migration from Ukraine
- Ukrainian Canadians
- Ukrainian diaspora
- Labor migration
