= Rozhniv rural hromada =

Rural hromada of Ivano-Frankivsk Oblast, Ukraine

Rozhniv rural hromada Рожнівська сільська громада
- Hromada
- Interactive map of Rozhniv rural hromada
- Country: Ukraine
- Oblast: Ivano-Frankivsk
- Raion: Kosiv

Area
  - Total: 105.9 km^{2} (40.9 sq mi)

Population (2023)
  - Total: 11,885
  - Density: 112.2/km^{2} (290.7/sq mi)
- Settlements: 4
- Villages: 4
- Website: rozhnivska-gromada.gov.ua

Rozhniv rural territorial hromada (Ukrainian: Рожнівська сільська територіальна громада, romanized: Rozhnivska silska terytorialna hromada) is a hromada in Kosiv Raion, Ivano-Frankivsk Oblast, Ukraine. Its capital is the village of Rozhniv.

The hromada has an area of 105.9 km^{2} (40.9 mi^{2}), as well as a population of 11,885 (as of 2023). It was originally established as an amalgamated hromada on 29 October 2017, before being expanded in 2020 as part of decentralisation in Ukraine.

== Composition ==
There are four villages in Rozhniv rural hromada:

- Khimchyn
- Kobaky
- Rozhniv
- Rybne
