= Kosiv painted ceramics =

Tradition of Kosiv painted ceramics
- UNESCO Intangible Cultural Heritage
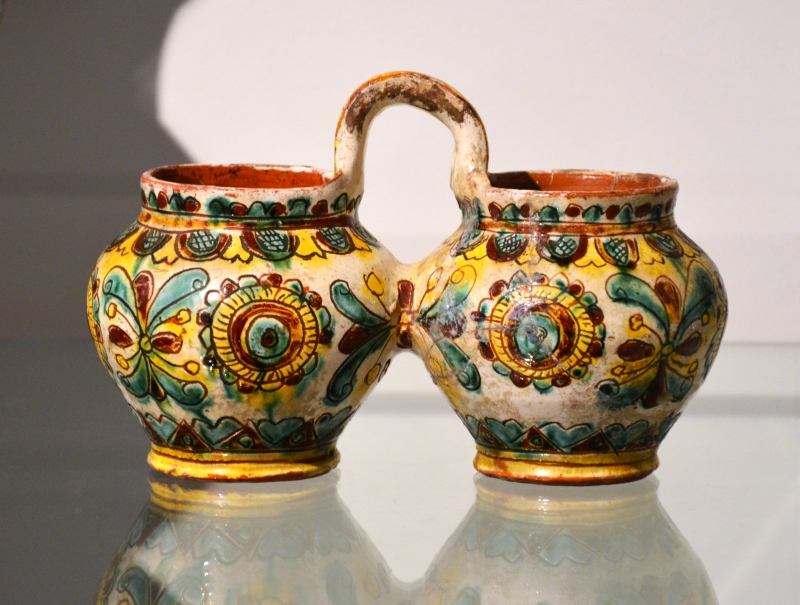
- Country: Ukraine
- Reference: 01456

Inscription history
- List: Representative list

Kosiv painted ceramics are traditional national Hutsul handicrafts, one of the varieties of Ukrainian ceramics. It is known for its pottery products such as various tableware, children's toys, souvenirs, stove tiles, decorative tiles. It is distinguished by a complex production technology and special drawings. Traditionally, ceramics from the village of Pistyn are also included in Kosiv ceramics.

On 13 December 2019, Kosiv painted ceramics were inscribed in the UNESCO Intangible Cultural Heritage Lists.

== History ==
The surroundings of Kosiv in Ivano-Frankivsk Oblast are rich in clay, so pottery has been developed here since ancient times. The formation of Hutsul pottery took place from the 15th century, but the most famous became Kosiv pottery, which got its name from the place of its creation. In many villages of the Hutsul region, the main craft was pottery, which allowed local craftsmen to quickly develop and acquire their special, unique style. This style developed, forming new types of manufacturing and painting techniques.

Hutsul craftsmen produced pots, jugs, bowls, mugs - all the necessary household utensils. But functional and decorative ceramics, as we know them today, developed at the end of the 18th and the beginning of the 19th centuries. These were mostly candlesticks and tiles. Tile stoves made in Kosiv were readily sold not only in Hutsul region, but also in Romania and Hungary. The oldest Kosiv tiles are kept in the museums of Bucharest and Vienna. Pottery was decorated with water-colored drawings of various types: stylized images of flowers, trees, animals (horse, deer, bear, birds), various human types (hunter, warrior, postman, musician, etc.), saints (most often St. George and St. Nicholas). Quite often, whole household scenes were drawn on the tiles.

In 1959, the Department of Artistic Ceramics was opened at the Kosiv School of Applied Arts (now KDIPDM LNAM). Its specificity is based on the best achievements of the pottery heritage of Kosiv, Pistyn and Kuty. In 1960, the Art Fund of the Ukrainian SSR under the Union of Artists was organized in Kosiv. In 1968, the artistic production plant of the Art Fund of the Ukrainian SSR was organized. In 1981, the Kosiv branch of the Artists' Union was formed on the basis of the Ivano-Frankivsk Union of Artists, which enabled artists to work separately, having their own branches.

== Gallery ==
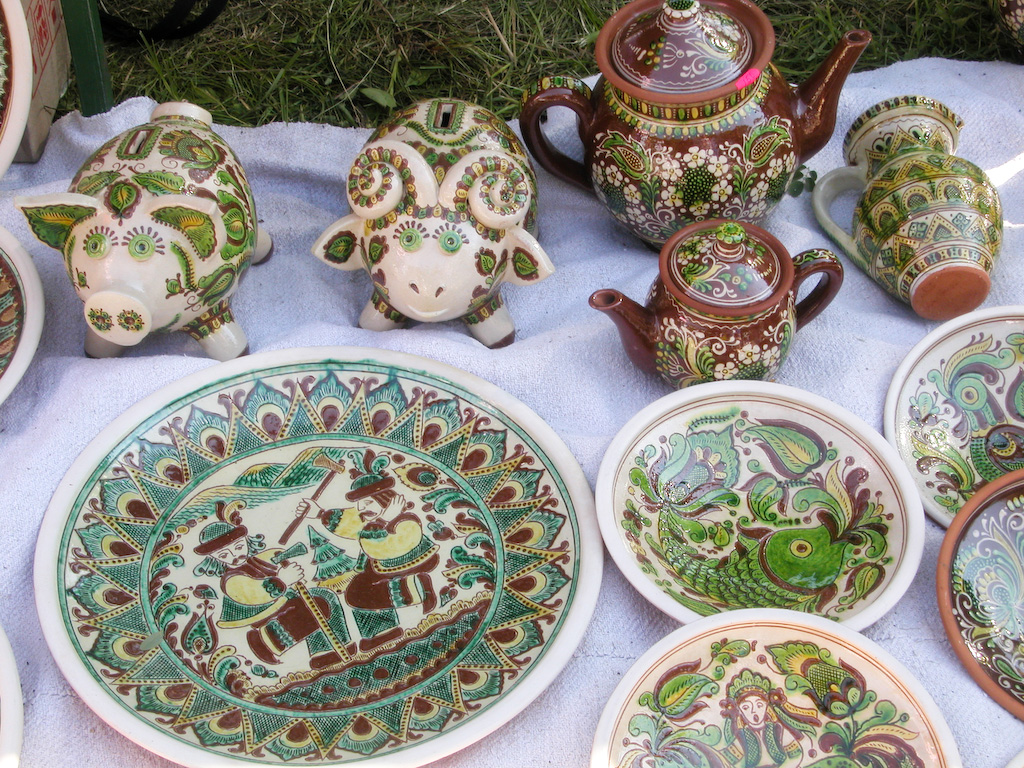
A selection of painted objects

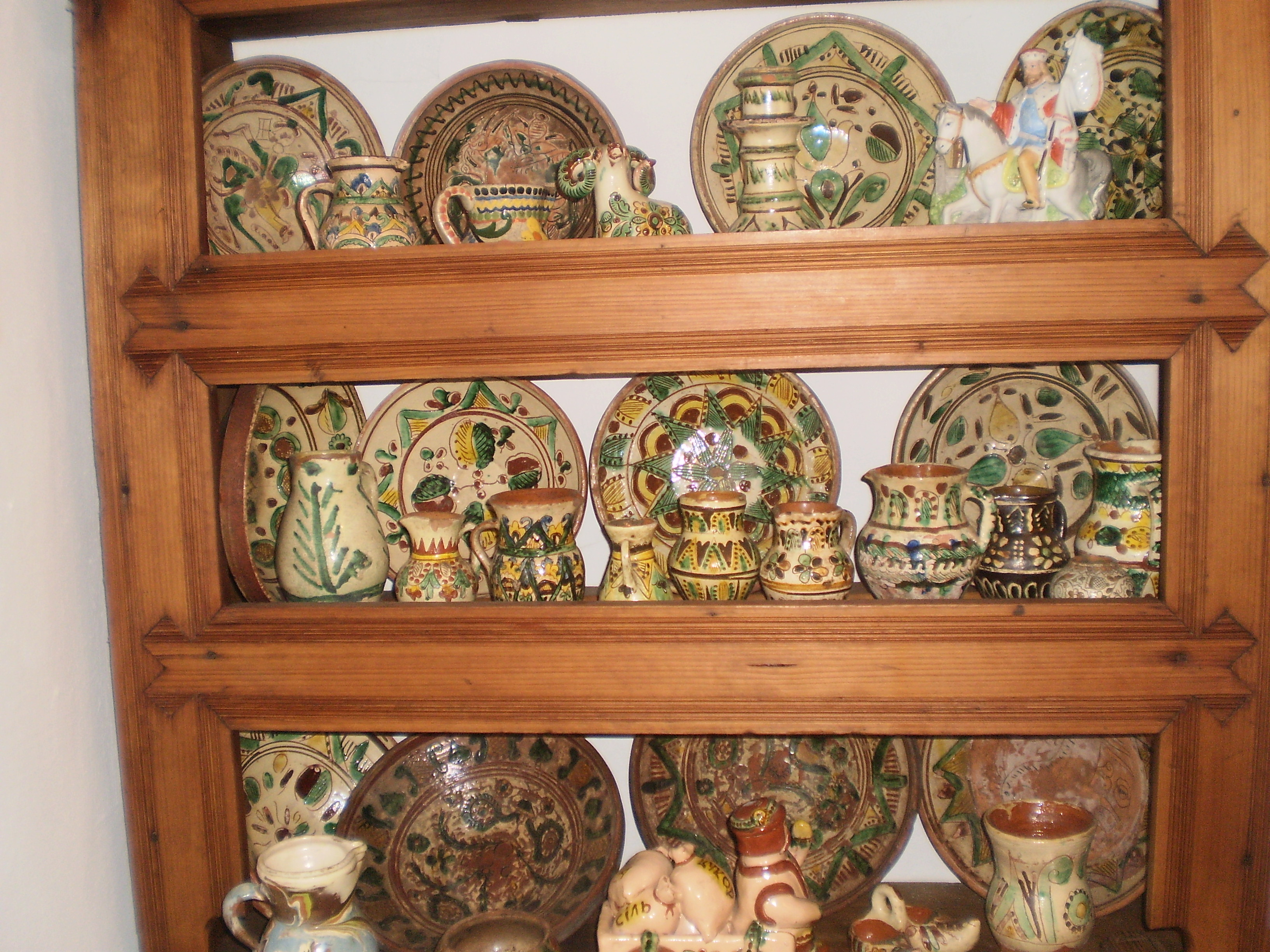
Exposition of a museum in Yaremche

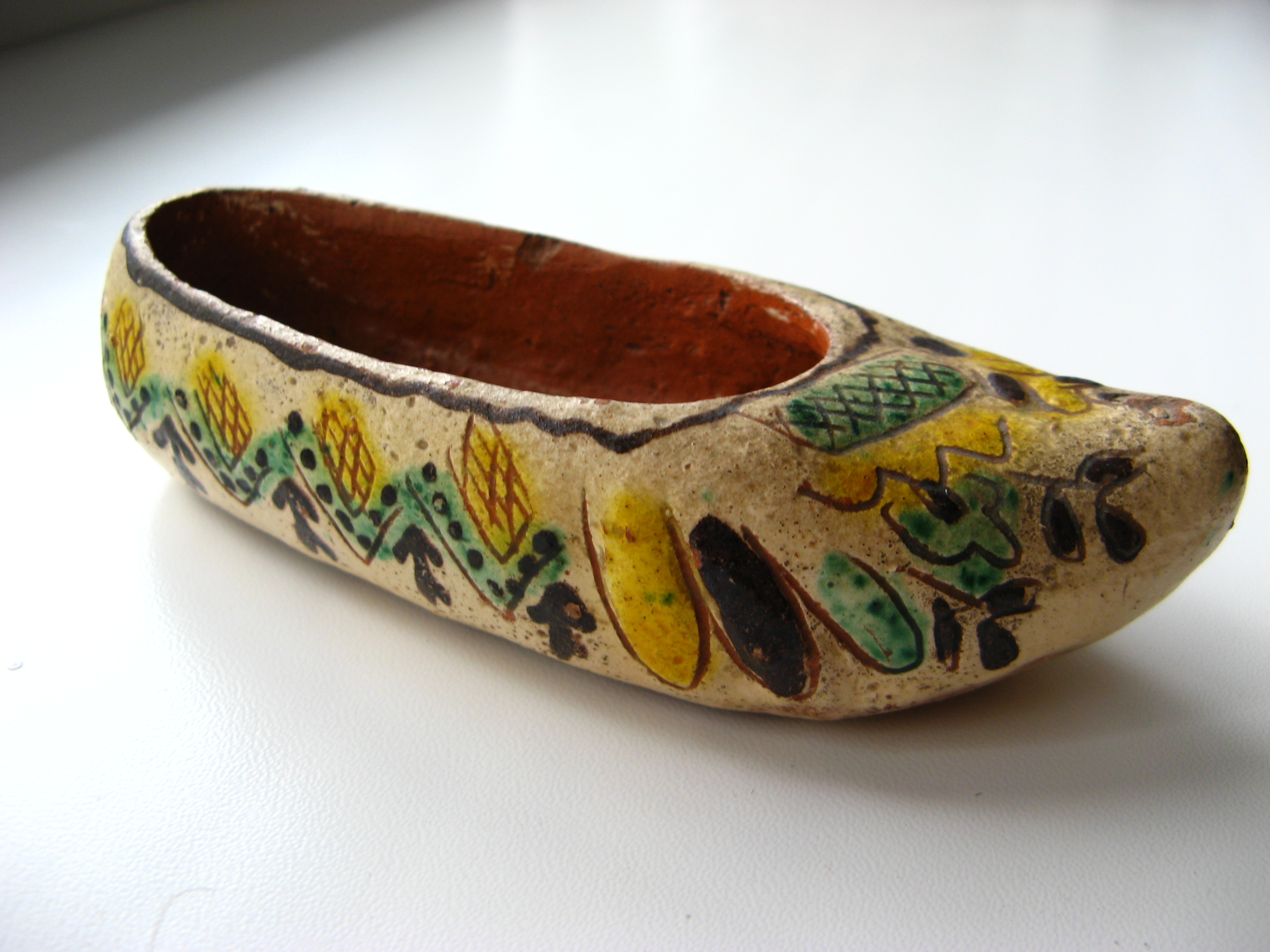
Shoe-shaped souvenir

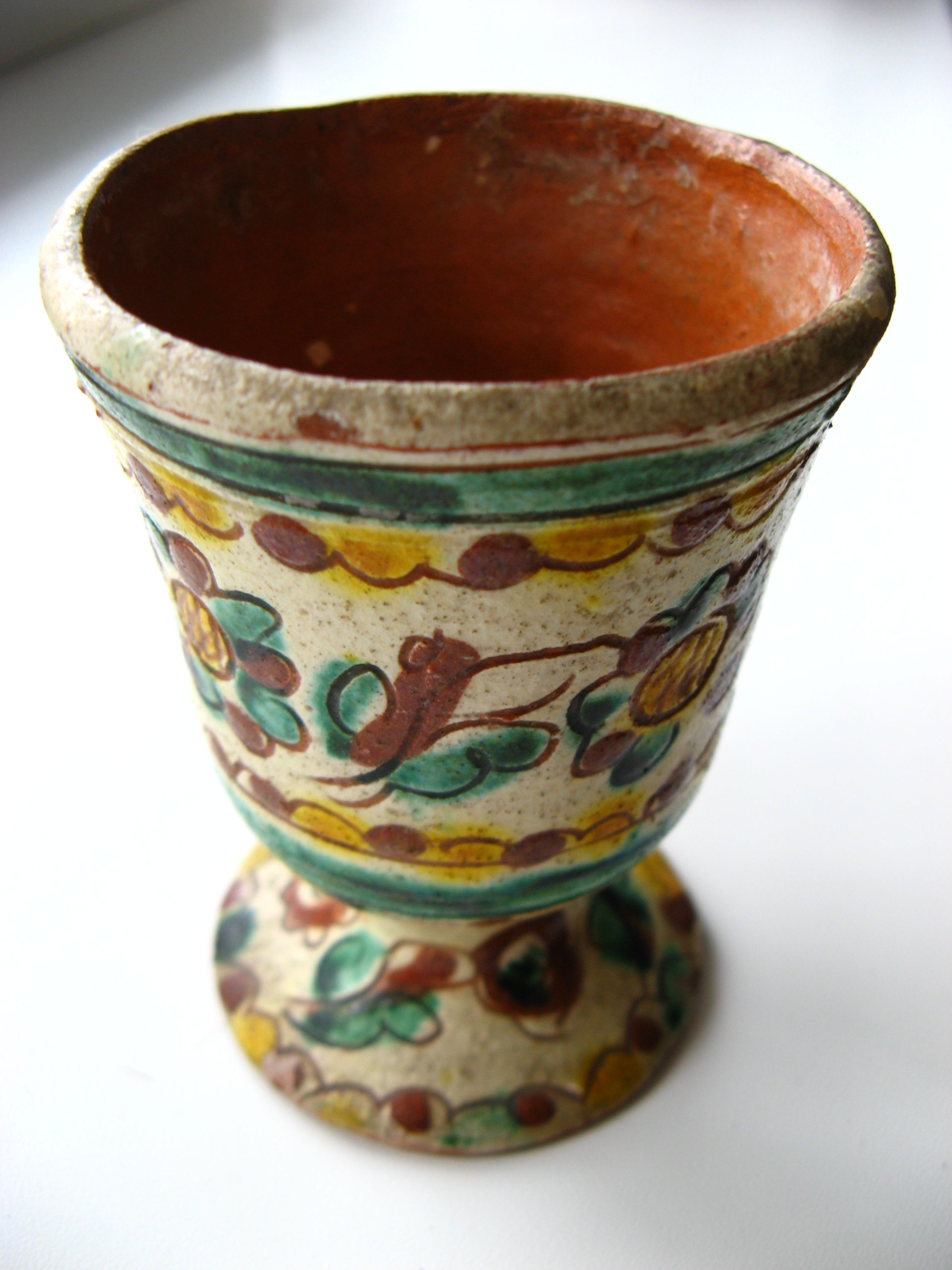
Small vase

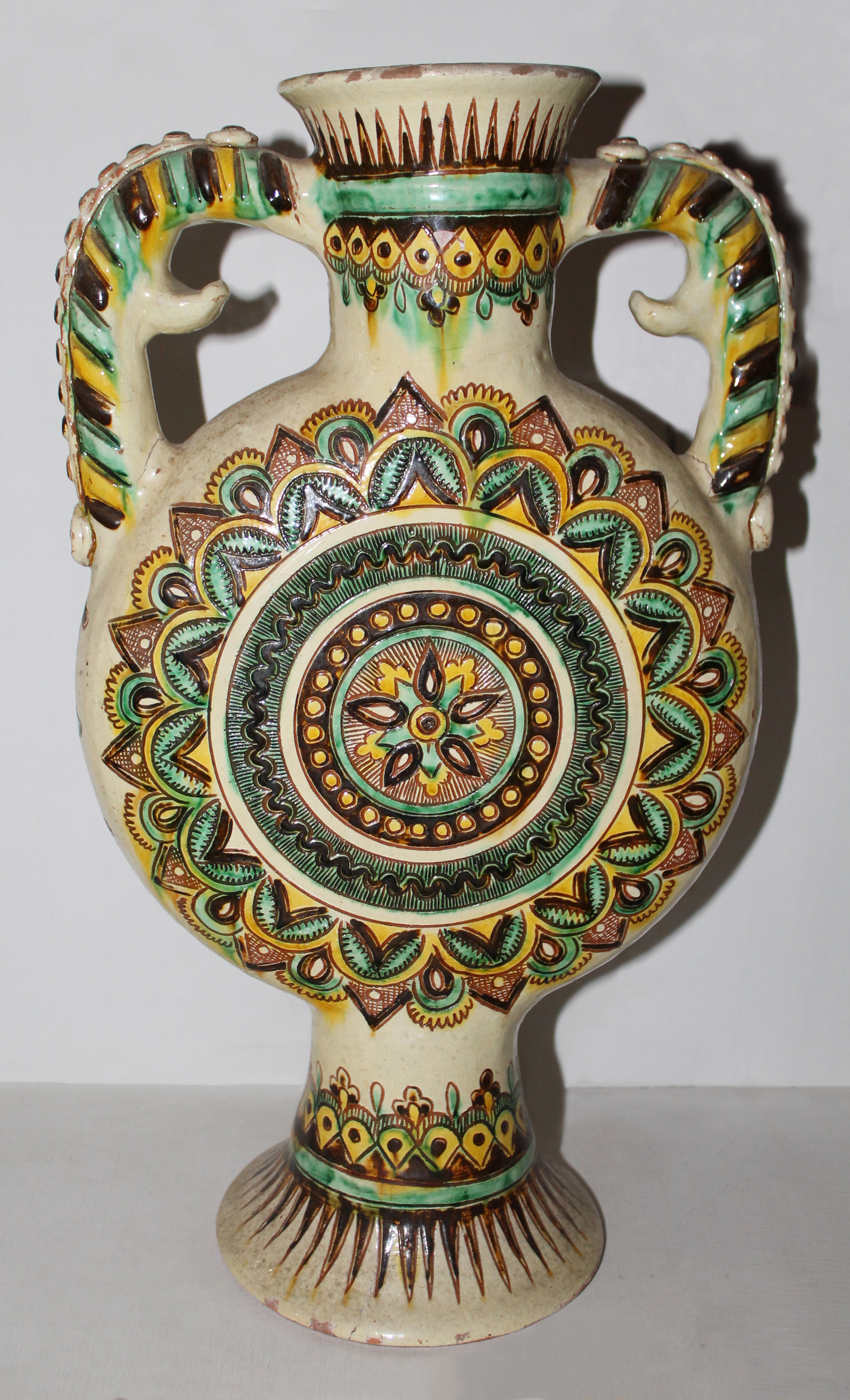
Kumanets

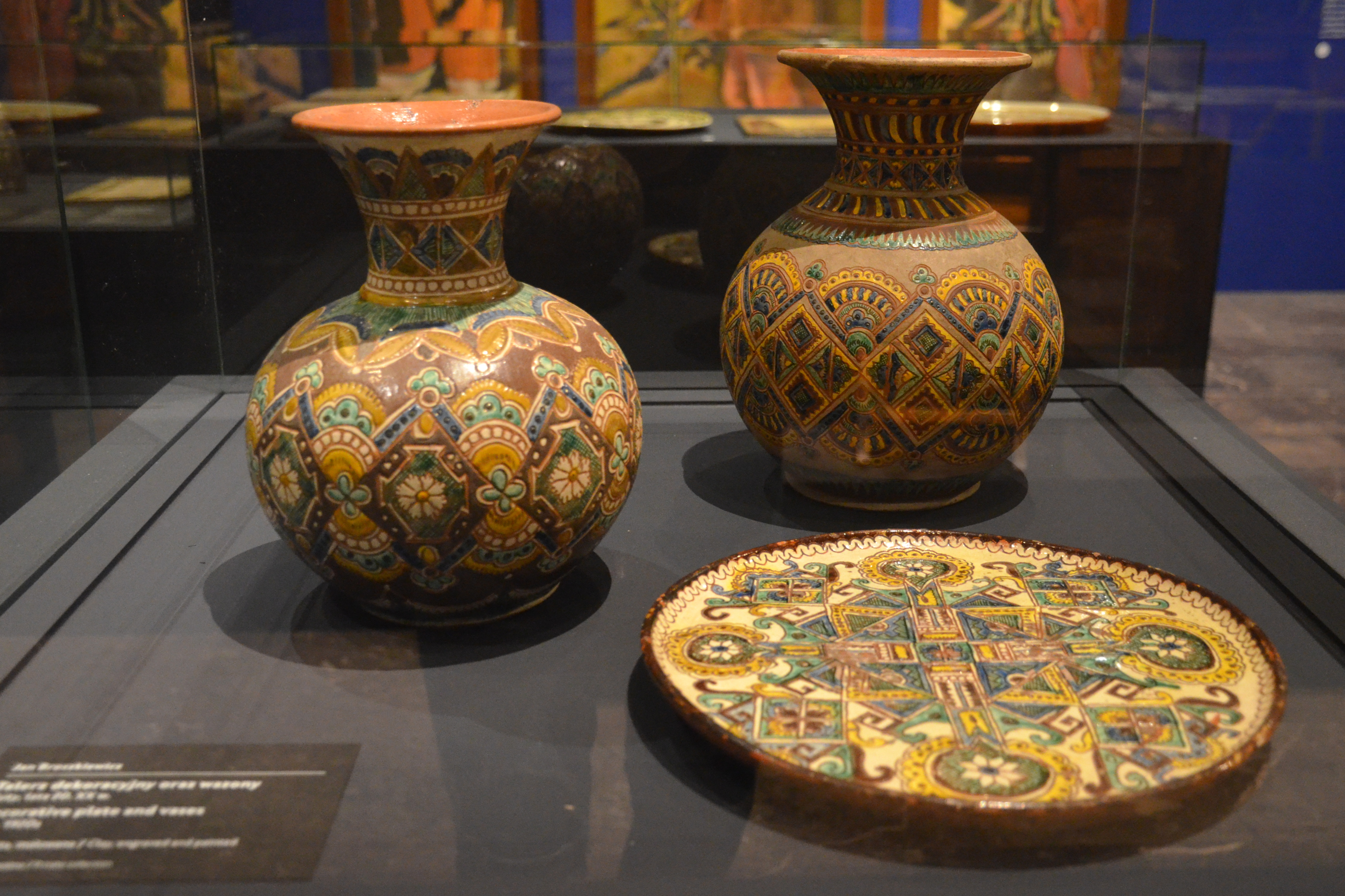
Kuty-style plate and vases

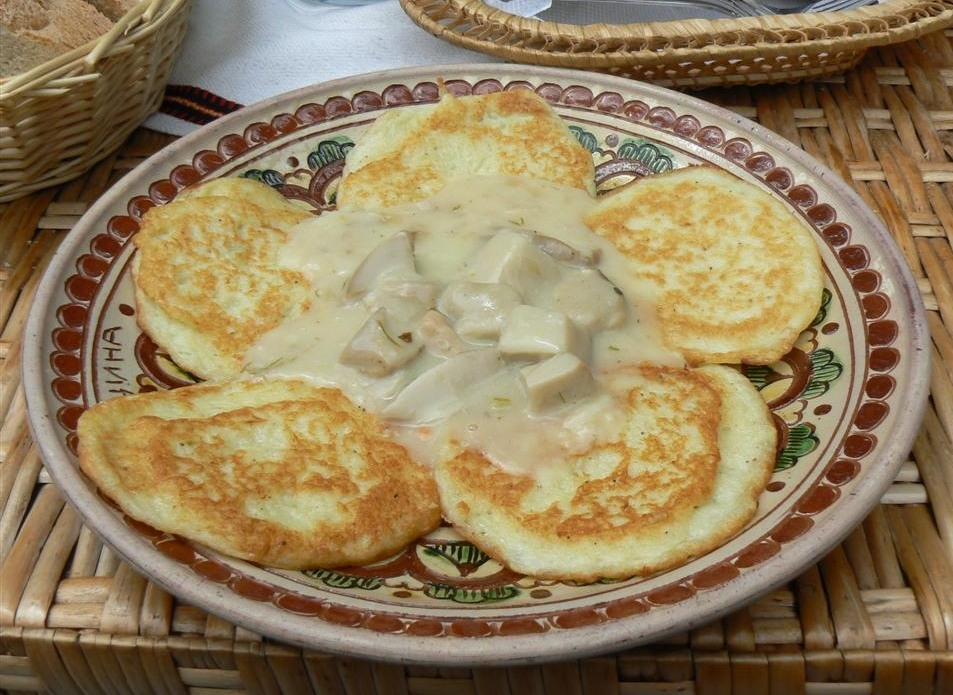
Deruny served in a Kosiv-style plate

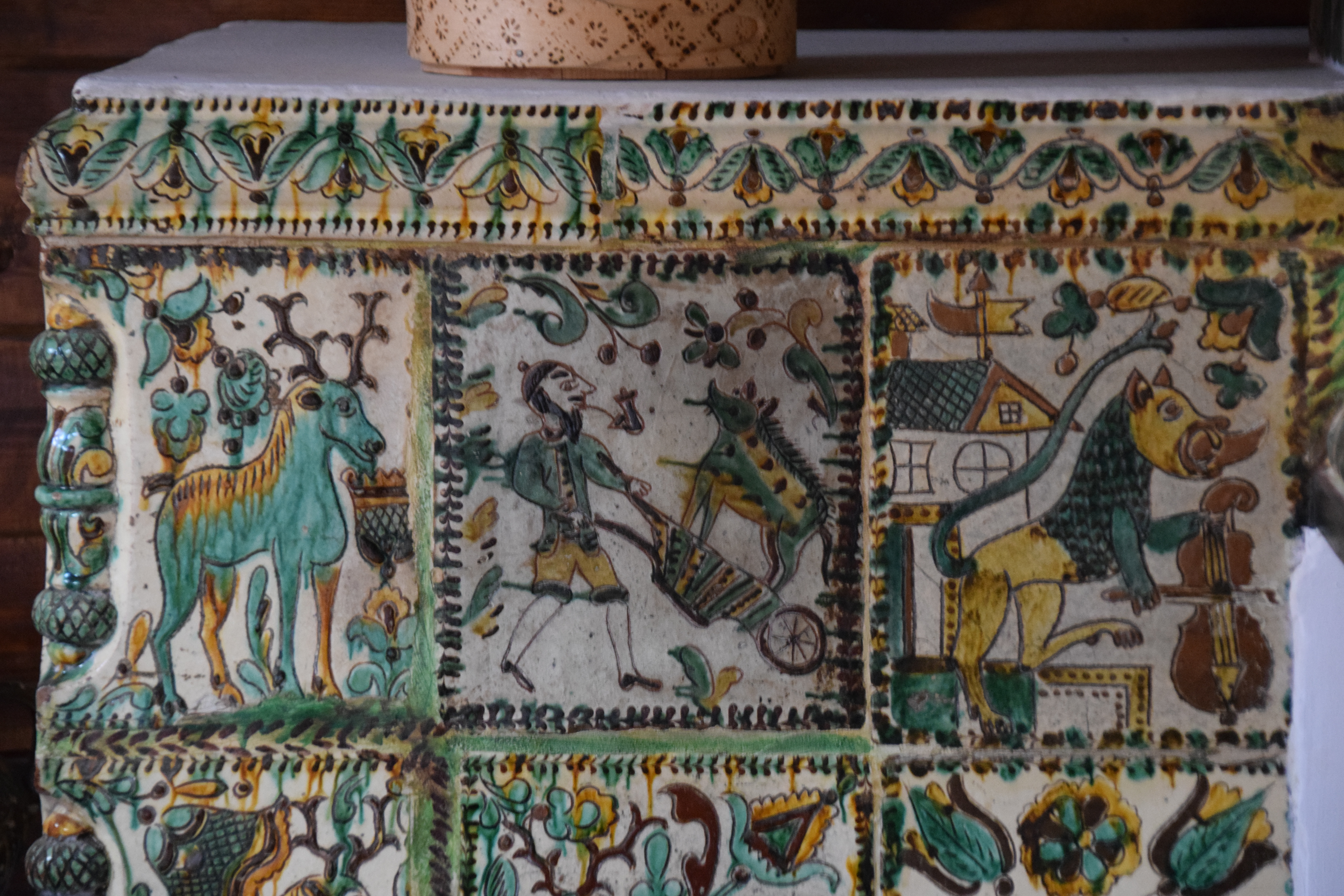
Stove tiles

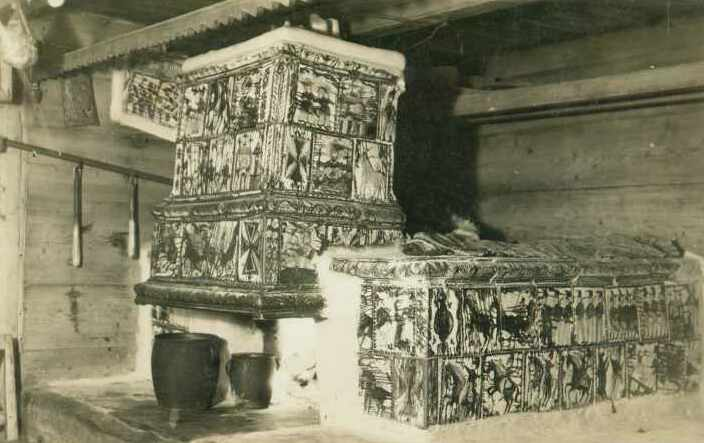
Traditional painted oven

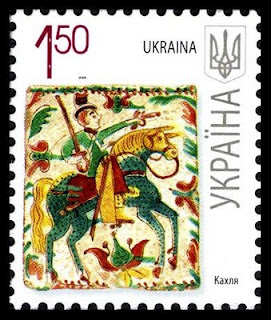
Stamp commemorating Kosiv ceramics

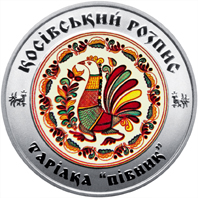
Coin commemorating Kosiv ceramics

== See also ==
- Mariia Hryniuk
