= Kosmach rural hromada =

Rural hromada of Ivano-Frankivsk Oblast, Ukraine

Kosmach rural hromada Космацька сільська громада
- Hromada
- Seal
- Interactive map of Kosmach rural hromada
- Country: Ukraine
- Oblast: Ivano-Frankivsk
- Raion: Kosiv

Area
  - Total: 114.0 km^{2} (44.0 sq mi)

Population (2023)
  - Total: 9,061
  - Density: 79.48/km^{2} (205.9/sq mi)
- Settlements: 3
- Villages: 3
- Website: kosmacka-gromada.gov.ua

Kosmach rural territorial hromada (Ukrainian: Космацька сільська територіальна громада, romanized: Kosmatska silska terytorialna hromada) is one of the hromadas of Ukraine, located in Kosiv Raion in the country's western Ivano-Frankivsk Oblast. Its administrative centre is the village of Kosmach.

Kosmach rural hromada has an area of 114.0 km^{2} (44.0 mi^{2}), as well as a population of 9,061 (as of 2023). It was originally established on 18 December 2016 as an amalgamated hromada before being expanded as part of decentralisation in Ukraine.

== Composition ==
There are three villages within the hromada:

- Brustury
- Kosmach
- Prokurava
