= Kuty settlement hromada =

Settlement in Ivano-Frankivsk Oblast, Ukraine

Kuty settlement hromada Кутська селищна громада
- Hromada
- Seal
- Interactive map of Kuty settlement hromada
- Country: Ukraine
- Oblast: Ivano-Frankivsk
- Raion: Kosiv

Area
  - Total: 113.5 km^{2} (43.8 sq mi)

Population (2023)
  - Total: 16,832
  - Density: 148.3/km^{2} (384.1/sq mi)
- Settlements: 7
- Villages: 6
- Towns: 1
- Website: kuty-rada.gov.ua

Kuty settlement territorial hromada (Ukrainian: Кутська селищна територіальна громада, romanized: Kutska selyshchna terytorialna hromada) is a hromada of Ukraine, located in Kosiv Raion within Ivano-Frankivsk Oblast. Its administrative centre is Kuty.

Kuty settlement hromada has an area of 113.5 km^{2} (43.8 mi^{2}). It has a population of 16,832 (as of 2023).

== Composition ==
In addition to one rural settlement (Kuty), the hromada includes six villages:

- Malyi Rozhyn
- Roztoky
- Slobidka
- Stari Kuty
- Tiudiv
- Velykyi Rozhyn
