= Kobaky =

Rural locality in Ivano-Frankivsk Oblast, Ukraine

Kobaky Кобаки
- Location in Ivano-Frankivsk Oblast Kobaky (Ukraine)
- Coordinates: 48°19′33″N 25°14′5″E
- Country: Ukraine
- Oblast: Ivano-Frankivsk Oblast
- Raion: Kosiv Raion
- Hromada: Rozhniv rural hromada
- Time zone: UTC+2 (EET)
  - Summer (DST): UTC+3 (EEST)
- Postal code: 78660

Kobaky (Ukrainian: Кобаки) is a village in the Rozhniv rural hromada of the Kosiv Raion of Ivano-Frankivsk Oblast in Ukraine.

There is a Marko Cheremshyna literary and memorial museum in the village.

== Religion ==
- St. Nicholas church (1852, wooden).

== Notable residents ==
- Marko Cheremshyna (1874–1927), Ukrainian writer of Hutsul background

== Sources ==
- "Kobaki, pow. kosowski". Geographical Dictionary of the Kingdom of Poland (in Polish). 4. Warszawa: Kasa im. Józefa Mianowskiego. 1883. p. 200.
