= Vasyl Stefanyk =

Ukrainian modernist writer and politician (1871–1936)

- Василь Семенович Стефаник
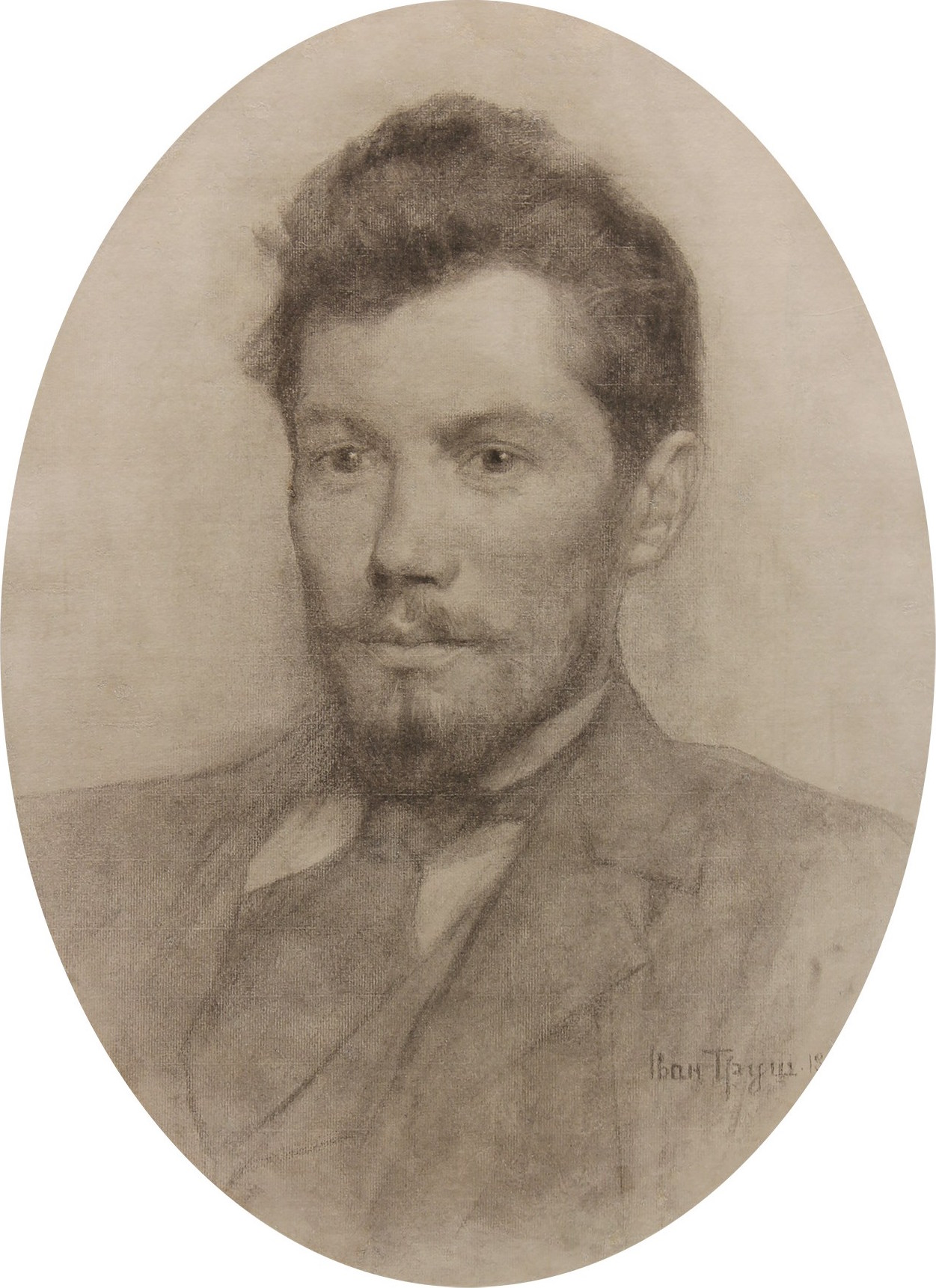
- Portrait of Stefanyk, 1896
- Born: May 14, 1871; Rusiv, Galicia, Austria-Hungary
- Died: December 7, 1936 (aged 65); Rusiv, Stanisławów Province, Second Polish Republic
- Resting place: Rusiv
- Citizenship: Austria-Hungary; West Ukrainian People's Republic; Second Polish Republic
- Education: Jagiellonian University
- Occupations: Writer; publicist; politician
- Spouse: Olha Hamorak (m. 1904; d. 1914)
- Children: 3, including Semen Stefanyk and Yuriy Stefanyk
- Writing career
- Pen name: Zheliznyi
- Language: Ukrainian, Polish, German
- Period: 1897–1933
- Genres: Short story, novella, prose poetry
- Notable works: Synia knyzhechka (1899), The Stone Cross (1900), Doroha (1901), Moie slovo (1905), Zemlia (1926)
- Movements: Expressionism, Modernism, Pokutia triad, Young Poland

Vasyl Semenovych Stefanyk (Ukrainian: Василь Семенович Стефаник; May 14, 1871 – December 7, 1936) was an influential Ukrainian modernist short-story writer, publicist, and political activist. A pioneer of Expressionism in Ukrainian prose, he formed the literary group known as the "Pokutia triad" (Покутська трійця) alongside Les Martovych and Marko Cheremshyna.

Active in the Ukrainian Radical Party alongside Ivan Franko and Mykhailo Pavlyk, Stefanyk served as a deputy to the Austrian Imperial Parliament from 1908 to 1918 and led the government delegation of the West Ukrainian People's Republic (ZUNR) to Kyiv for the proclamation of the Unification Act with the Ukrainian People's Republic in January 1919. In 1933, living in his native village of Rusiv in interwar Poland, he publicly renounced a personal pension granted by the government of Soviet Ukraine in protest against the Holodomor famine and Soviet repressions against the Ukrainian intelligentsia.

== Biography ==
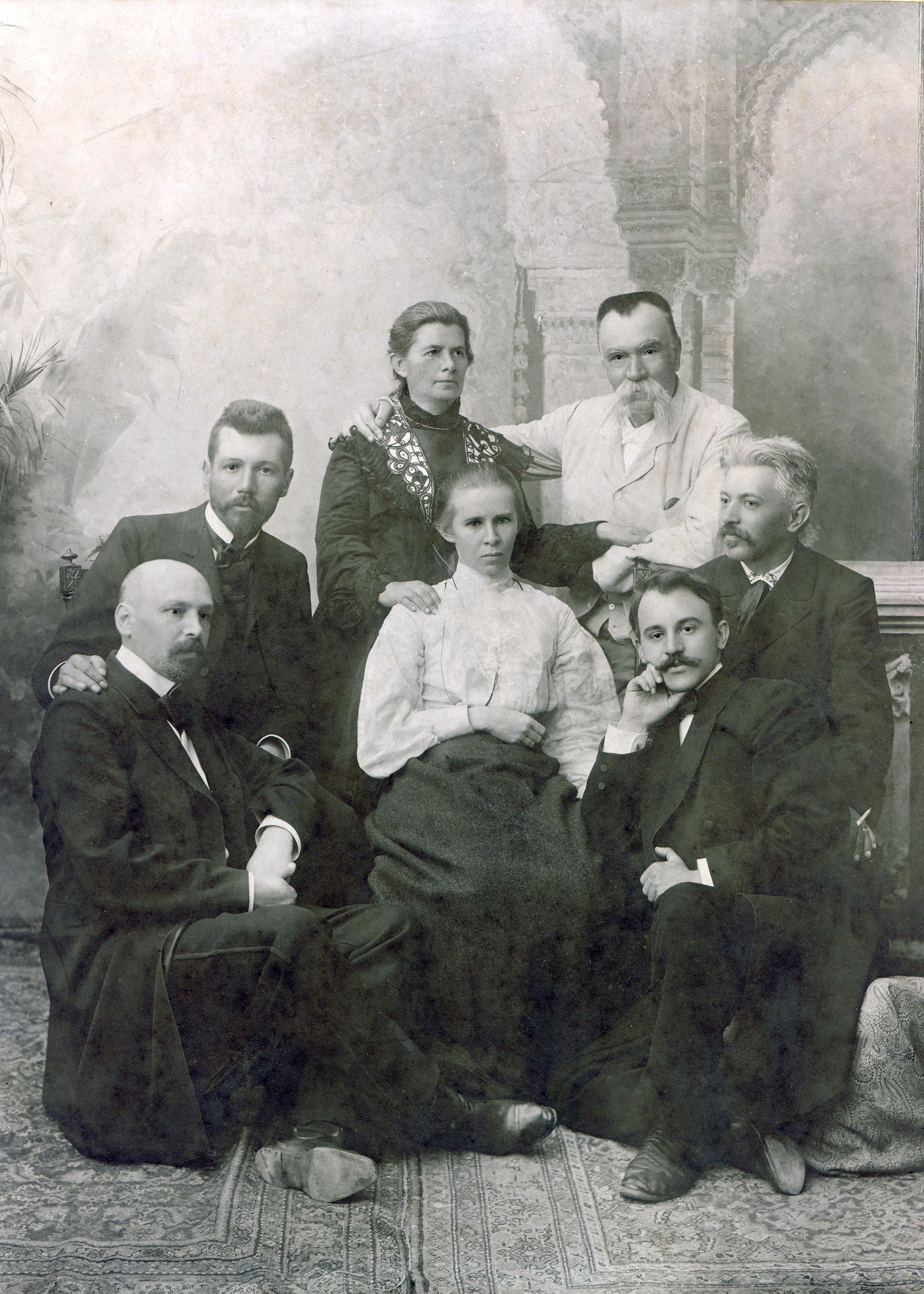
A group of Ukrainian writers gathered in Poltava to inaugurate a monument to Ivan Kotliarevsky, 1903. From left: Mykhailo Kotsiubynsky, Vasyl Stefanyk, Olena Pchilka, Lesya Ukrainka, Mykhailo Starytsky, Hnat Khotkevych, Volodymyr Samiilenko.

=== Early life and education ===
Vasyl Stefanyk was born on May 14, 1871, in the village of Rusiv, Sniatyn County, in the historical region of Pokuttia (then part of the Kingdom of Galicia and Lodomeria in Austria-Hungary, now in Kolomyia Raion, Ivano-Frankivsk Oblast, Ukraine). He grew up in the family of a prosperous, strict peasant farmer, Semen Stefanyk, and his deeply devoted mother, who introduced him to Pokuttian folk songs and oral traditions.

After attending elementary school in Rusiv (from 1878) and the municipal school in Sniatyn (from 1880), Stefanyk studied at the Polish-language gymnasium in Kolomyia starting in 1883. There he befriended fellow future writers Les Martovych and Ivan Semaniuk (Marko Cheremshyna), participated in clandestine Ukrainian student reading circles (chytalni), and met women's rights activist Anna Pavlyk, who introduced him to Ukrainian literature and the radical movement. Expelled from the Kolomyia gymnasium in 1890 for his involvement in a secret youth circle, he transferred to the gymnasium in Drohobych, where he personally met Ivan Franko and graduated in 1892.

In 1892, Stefanyk enrolled in the Faculty of Medicine at the Jagiellonian University in Kraków. Rather than pursuing medical practice, he immersed himself in Kraków's modernist literary and artistic circles, forming a lifelong friendship with Polish physician and critic Wacław Moraczewski and his wife Sofiia, as well as writers of the Young Poland movement such as Stanisław Przybyszewski and Władysław Orkan. Simultaneously, he published political journalism in radical periodicals (Narod, Khliborob, Hromadskyi holos) and campaigned for peasant candidates in Galician elections—including Ivan Franko in 1897—leading to his brief arrest by Austro-Hungarian authorities in 1895. He left the university without taking a medical degree in 1900.

=== Political and public career ===
Following his marriage in January 1904 to Olha Hamorak, daughter of Greek Catholic priest and Galician Diet deputy Kyrylo Hamorak, Stefanyk settled initially on his father-in-law's estate in Stetseva before returning permanently to Rusiv in 1910. In 1903, he traveled to Poltava in Russian-ruled Ukraine for the unveiling of the monument to Ivan Kotliarevsky, meeting leading eastern Ukrainian writers including Lesya Ukrainka, Mykhailo Kotsiubynsky, Olena Pchilka, and Mykola Lysenko.

In 1908, running as a candidate of the Ukrainian Radical Party, Stefanyk was elected to the House of Deputies of the Austrian Imperial Parliament (Reichsrat) in Vienna, holding his mandate until the collapse of the empire in 1918. In parliament, he defended Ukrainian peasant and educational rights, spoke out against administrative censorship in Galicia, and opposed the Austro-Hungarian annexation of Bosnia and Herzegovina.

During World War I, after the death of his wife in February 1914 left him to raise three young sons alone, Stefanyk was briefly arrested on a false denunciation in March 1915, but was released following the intervention of Marko Cheremshyna and spent part of the war years in Vienna.

Stefanyk enthusiastically welcomed the emergence of Ukrainian statehood during the Ukrainian War of Independence. In January 1919, he headed the 65-member government delegation of the West Ukrainian People's Republic (ZUNR) sent to Kyiv for the ceremonial proclamation of the Unification Act (Akt Zluky) uniting Western Ukraine with the Ukrainian People's Republic.

Living in Rusiv under Polish rule during the interwar period, Stefanyk remained active in the Prosvita enlightenment society and the cooperative movement. In 1928, the government of the Ukrainian Soviet Socialist Republic awarded him a personal state pension in recognition of his literary stature. However, in 1933, upon learning of the Holodomor famine and Stalinist terror against Ukrainian writers and intellectuals, Stefanyk publicly refused the Soviet pension. Metropolitan Andrey Sheptytsky subsequently arranged for the Ukrainian Greek Catholic Church to pay Stefanyk an equivalent pension; Stefanyk requested the sum in small copper coins and distributed it to beggars in the town square, asking them to pray for the victims of the famine.

After prolonged illness, Vasyl Stefanyk died in Rusiv on December 7, 1936, and was buried in his native village.

== Literary career ==
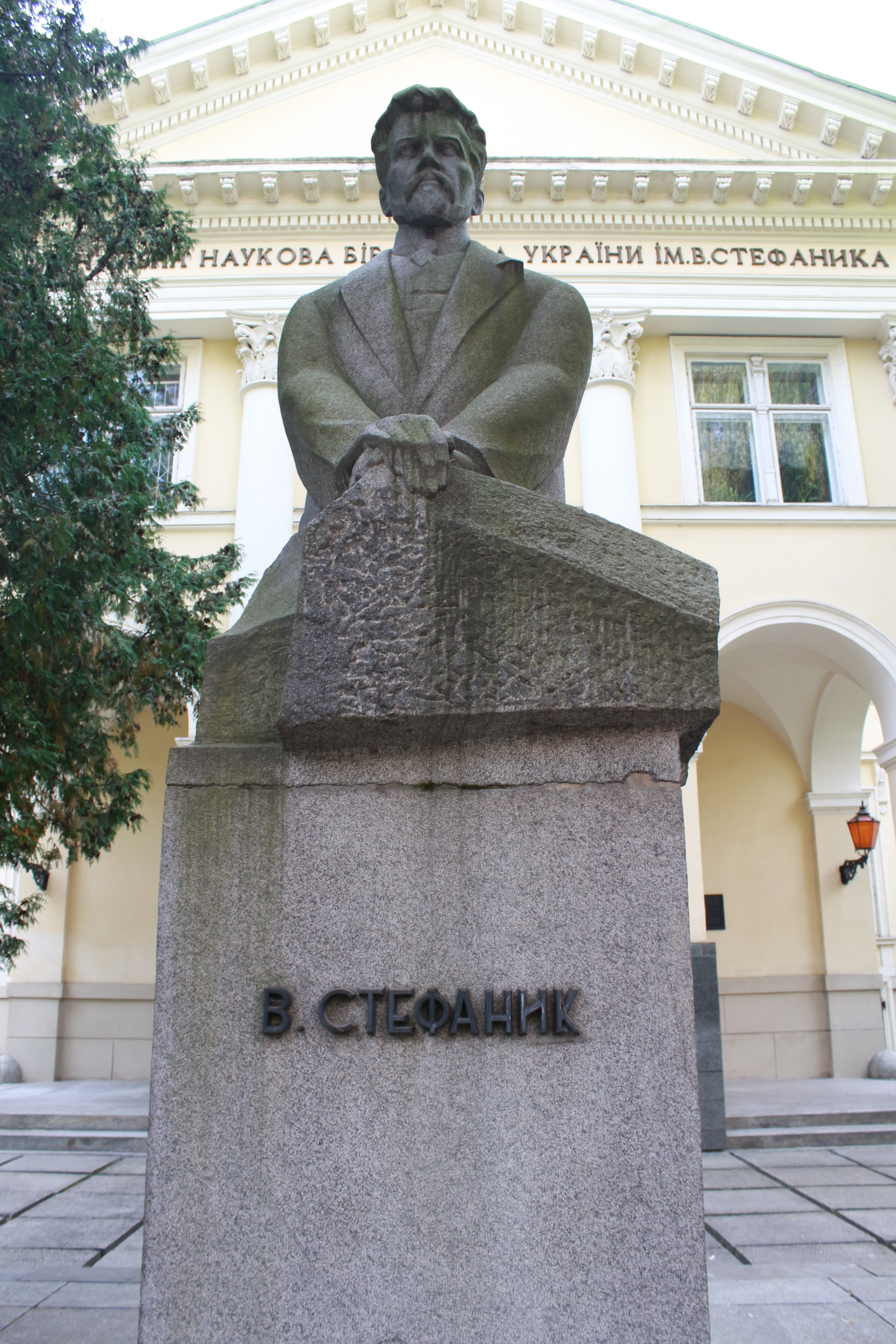
Monument to Vasyl Stefanyk in Lviv

Stefanyk's literary output divides into two distinct creative periods: 1897–1901 and 1916–1933. After early experiments with lyrical prose poems (a manuscript collection titled Z oseni, which he destroyed), he made his realist debut in 1897 in the Chernivtsi newspaper Pratsia with seven short stories, including "Vyvodyly z sela" ("Led Out of the Village") and "Synia knyzhechka" ("The Little Blue Book").

His first collection, Synia knyzhechka (The Little Blue Book, Chernivtsi, 1899), brought immediate critical acclaim from Ivan Franko, Lesya Ukrainka, Mykhailo Kotsiubynsky, and Olha Kobylianska. It was followed by Kaminnyi khrest (The Stone Cross, Lviv, 1900), Doroha (The Road, 1901), and Moie slovo (My Word, 1905), after which Stefanyk ceased publishing fiction for fifteen years.

Stefanyk broke away from nineteenth-century ethnographic populism, pioneering Ukrainian Expressionism through extreme narrative compression—describing his stories as "pictures without a frame"—intense psychological drama, dialogue-driven structure, and expressive use of the Pokuttia–Bukovina dialect. His early stories depict peasants confronting extreme existential thresholds: poverty, military conscription, old-age abandonment ("Sama-samiska"), infanticide driven by despair ("Novyna"), and mass emigration to North America ("Kaminnyi khrest"). Explaining his aesthetic credo in 1927, Stefanyk wrote that he sought "to tune and tighten the strings of our peasant's soul so strongly that great Beethoven music would come out of it."

Triggered by the devastation of World War I, Stefanyk resumed writing in 1916 with anti-war and patriotic stories such as "Ditocha pryhoda" ("A Children's Adventure") and "Mariia" (dedicated to Ivan Franko), later collected in Zemlia (The Earth, 1926), alongside late autobiographical sketches written up to 1933.

== Personal life ==
In 1904, Stefanyk married Olha Viktoriia Hamorak (1871–1914). They had three sons:

- Semen Stefanyk (1904–1981), lawyer and Soviet Ukrainian political figure;
- Kyrylo Stefanyk (1908–1987), first director of the Vasyl Stefanyk Literary and Memorial Museum in Rusiv;
- Yuriy Stefanyk (1909–1985), literary critic, journalist, and émigré public figure in Canada.

== Legacy and in culture ==
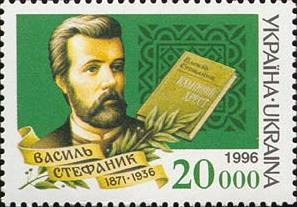
Stefanyk portrayed on a Ukrainian stamp of 1996

- In 1941, the Vasyl Stefanyk Literary and Memorial Museum was opened in his family home in Rusiv.
- Vasyl Stefanyk Precarpathian National University in Ivano-Frankivsk and the Stefanyk National Science Library in Lviv are named in his honor.
- Stefanyk's "Blue Book" was republished in Ukraine in 1966 under the title The Maple Leaves in an edition illustrated by Mykhaylo Turovsky.
- Three stories from The Blue Book and The Stone Cross formed the basis of the classic 1968 Ukrainian film The Stone Cross, directed by Leonid Osyka.
- Stefanyk was deeply concerned with the fate of Ukrainian immigrants to Canada; the title story of The Stone Cross (Kaminnyi khrest) depicts the departure of an emigrant from Rusiv based on Ivan Didukh, who settled and died in Hilliard, Alberta, in 1911. A bronze statue of Stefanyk, sculpted by W. Skolozdra and gifted by Ukraine to the Association of United Ukrainian Canadians in 1971 to mark the centenary of his birth, stands at the Ukrainian Cultural Heritage Village east of Edmonton, Alberta.
- In 2021, the National Bank of Ukraine issued a commemorative coin marking the 150th anniversary of Stefanyk's birth.

== Bibliography ==
- Lepky, Bohdan. Vasyl’ Stefanyk: Literaturna kharakterystyka (Lviv, 1903)
- Hrytsai, Ostap. Vasyl’ Stefanyk: Sproba krytychnoï kharakterystyky (Vienna, 1921)
- Kryzhanivs’kyi, S. Vasyl’ Stefanyk: Krytyko-biohrafichnyi narys (Kyiv, 1946)
- Kostashchuk, V. Volodar dum selians’kykh (Lviv, 1959)
- Kushch, O. Vasyl’ Stefanyk: Bibliohrafichnyi pokazhchyk (Kyiv, 1961)
- Kobzei, T. Velykyi riz’bar ukraïns’kykh selians’kykh dush (Toronto, 1966)
- Lesyn, V. Vasyl’ Stefanyk — maister novely (Kyiv, 1970)
- Lutsiv, L. Vasyl’ Stefanyk — spivets’ ukraïns’koï zemli (New York–Jersey City, 1971)
- Struk, Danylo. A Study of Vasyl Stefanyk: The Pain at the Heart of Existence (Littleton, Colo., 1973)
- Wiśniewska, E. Wasyl Stefanyk w obliczu Młodej Polski (Wrocław, 1986)
- Chernenko, Oleksandra. Ekspresionizm u tvorchosti Vasylia Stefanyka (New York, 1989)
- Hnidan, O. Vasyl’ Stefanyk: Zhyttia i tvorchist’ (Kyiv, 1991)
- Mokry, Włodzimierz. Ukraina Wasyla Stefanyka (Kraków, 2001)
- Horak, Roman. Krov na chornii rilli: Ese-biohrafiia Vasylia Stefanyka (Kyiv, 2010)
