= Marko Cheremshyna =

Ukrainian writer and lawyer (1874–1927)

- Марко Черемшина
- Cheremshyna, c. 1901
- Born: Ivan Yuriiovych Semaniuk; 13 July 1874; Kobaky, Kingdom of Galicia and Lodomeria, Austria-Hungary
- Died: 25 April 1927 (aged 52); Sniatyn, Stanisławów Voivodeship, Second Polish Republic
- Resting place: Sniatyn
- Citizenship: Austria-Hungary; West Ukrainian People's Republic; Second Polish Republic
- Education: University of Vienna (Dr. jur., 1906)
- Occupations: Writer, lawyer, translator, public figure
- Spouse: Nataliia Karpiuk (m. 1914)
- Writing career
- Genres: Short story, novella, prose poetry
- Notable works: Karby (1901), Selo vyhybaie (1925), Verkhovyna (1929)
- Movements: Pokutia triad, Modernism

Marko Cheremshyna (Ukrainian: Марко Черемшина; pen name of Ivan Yuriiovych Semaniuk; 13 July 1874 – 25 April 1927) was a Ukrainian modernist writer of Hutsul background, lawyer, and public figure. Along with Vasyl Stefanyk and Les Martovych, he formed the literary group known as the "Pokutia triad" (Покутська трійця).

== Biography ==
Ivan Semaniuk was born on 13 July 1874 into a peasant family of Ivan and Hanna (née Oleksiuk) Semaniuk in the village of Kobaky, Kosiv County, in Galicia (then part of Austria-Hungary, now in Ivano-Frankivsk Oblast, Ukraine). After completing local schooling in 1889, he entered the Ukrainian gymnasium in Kolomyia, where instruction was initially conducted in Polish; despite not knowing the language upon arrival, he mastered it quickly and graduated in 1896 as one of the top students.

Intending to study medicine, he traveled to Vienna, but due to high tuition fees enrolled instead in the Faculty of Law at the University of Vienna. He completed his university studies in 1901 and received his Doctor of Law degree in 1906.

From 1906 to 1912, Cheremshyna worked as a legal clerk (Konzipient) in the law office of Mykola Lahodynskyi in Deliatyn. In 1912, he opened his own law practice in Sniatyn, which became an active center of Ukrainian cultural, educational, and civic life in the Pokuttia region. On 24 January 1914, he married Nataliia Karpiuk. During World War I, he lived in his native Kobaky before returning to Sniatyn, where he remained for the rest of his life.

Cheremshyna was fluent in 13 languages and translated literary works into Ukrainian from German, Czech, Polish, and Hungarian without relying on interlinear glosses. He also researched Hutsul folklore and spiritual culture, planning to publish a scholarly study on the subject. He died suddenly on 25 April 1927 in Sniatyn while visiting his father's grave, and was buried in Sniatyn.

== Literary career ==
Cheremshyna began writing while still a gymnasium student in Kolomyia, publishing early pieces under the pseudonyms Vasyl Zarenko and Marko Lehit, and submitting an early play, Nesamovyti (The Frenzied), to a literary competition organized by the Lviv journal Zoria. His first published short story, "Kermanych" ("The Helmsman"), appeared in 1896 in the Chernivtsi newspaper Bukovyna.

In 1900–1901, he published a series of short stories in Literaturno-naukovyi vistnyk (Lviv) and Bukovyna, which were collected in his debut book, Karby. Novely z hutsulskoho zhyttia (Notches: Novellas from Hutsul Life, 1901). Consisting of 15 stories—including "Sviatyi Mykolai u harti", "Khiba daruimo vodu", "Raz maty rodyla", "Zvedenytsia", and "Bilmo"—the collection portrayed the harsh social realities and spiritual world of Hutsul peasants in Austro-Hungarian Galicia and established Cheremshyna as a leading Ukrainian modernist prose writer.

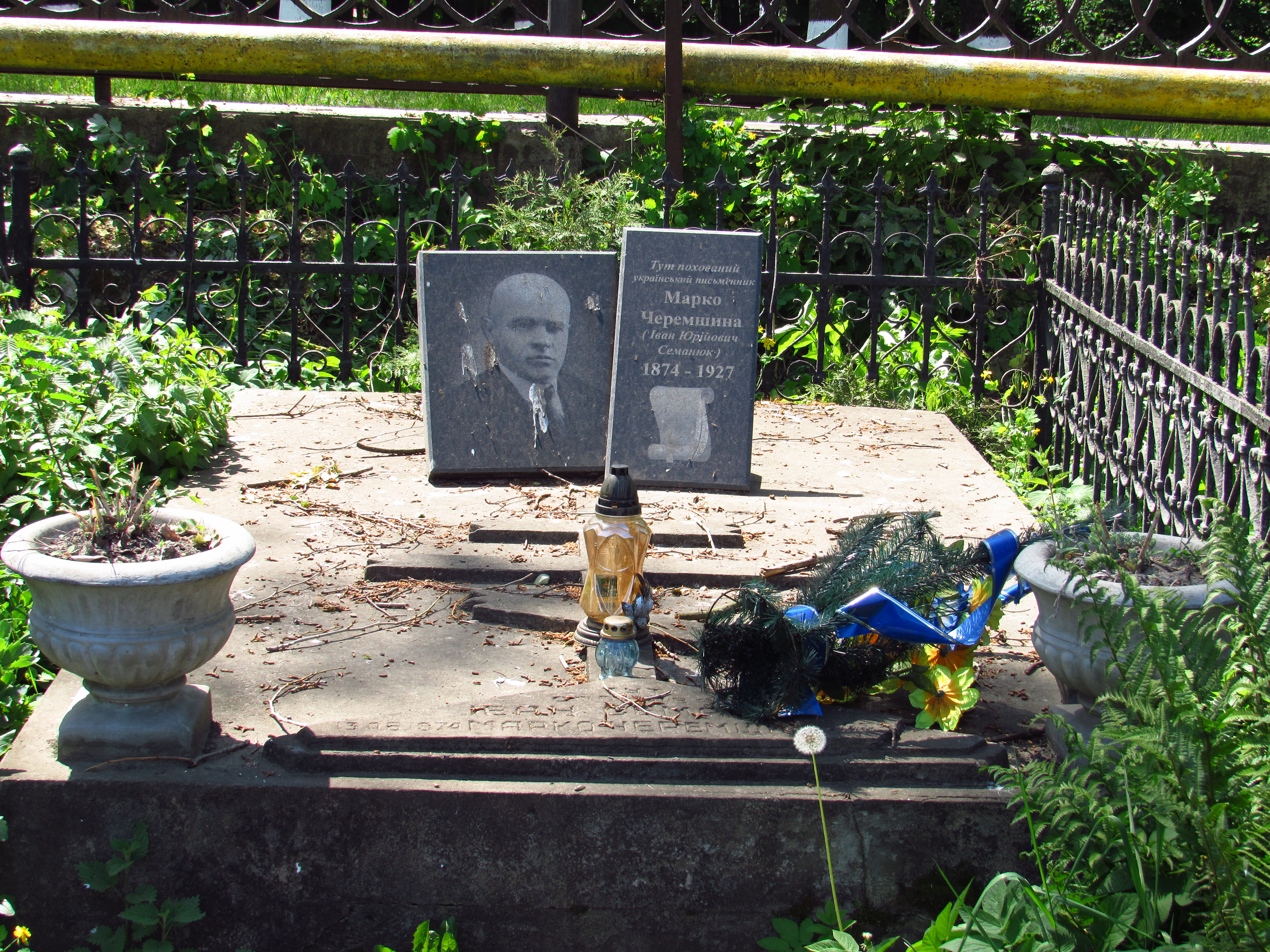
Tomb of Marko Cheremshyna in Sniatyn

Following a prolonged literary hiatus after Karby, Cheremshyna returned to writing in 1919 with a cycle of anti-war stories depicting the devastation of Galician villages during World War I, collected in Selo vyhybaie (The Village Is Perishing, 1925, with an introductory essay by Mykola Zerov). A third thematic cycle, published posthumously as Verkhovyna (1929), addressed peasant life under Polish rule in the interwar period.

Cheremshyna's prose is noted for its lyricism, psychological depth, rhythmic cadence, and extensive incorporation of Hutsul dialect, folk laments, carols, and legends. Alongside his close friends and fellow Pokuttian writers Vasyl Stefanyk and Les Martovych, he is grouped in Ukrainian literary history as part of the "Pokutia triad".

== Legacy ==
- In 1949, the Marko Cheremshyna Literary and Memorial Museum was opened in his former residence in Sniatyn, alongside a monument dedicated to the writer. A memorial house-museum also operates in his native village of Kobaky.
- The Marko Cheremshyna Literary and Artistic Prize was established in his honor.
- A documentary film, Marko Cheremshyna, was produced in 1975, and his short story "Slioza" ("The Tear") was adapted into the animated film Rizdviana kazka (A Christmas Tale) by Ukranimafilm in 1993.

== Selected works ==
- Karby. Novely z hutsulskoho zhyttia (Notches: Novellas from Hutsul Life, 1901)
- Selo vyhybaie (The Village Is Perishing, 1925)
- Verkhovyna (Highlands, 1929, posthumous)
- Tvory. Povne vydannia (Complete Works, Vols. I–III, Lviv, 1937)
