= Kosiv urban hromada =

Urban hromada in Ivano-Frankivsk Oblast, Ukraine

Kosiv urban hromada Косівська міська громада
- Hromada
- Interactive map of Kosiv urban hromada
- Country: Ukraine
- Oblast: Ivano-Frankivsk
- Raion: Kosiv

Area
  - Total: 337.3 km^{2} (130.2 sq mi)

Population (2023)
  - Total: 32,600
  - Density: 96.6/km^{2} (250/sq mi)
- Settlements: 15
- Cities: 1
- Villages: 14
- Website: kosivmr.gov.ua

Kosiv urban territorial hromada (Ukrainian: Косівська міська територіальна громада, romanized: Kosivska miska terytorialna hromada) is a hromada located in Ivano-Frankivsk Oblast, in western Ukraine. Its administrative centre is the city of Kosiv.

Kosiv urban hromada has an area of 337.3 km^{2} (130.2 mi^{2}), as well as a population of 32,600 (as of 2023).

== Settlements ==
In addition to one city (Kosiv), there are 14 villages in the hromada:

- Babyn
- Verbovets
- Horod
- Mykytyntsi
- Pistyn
- Richka
- Smodna
- Snidavka
- Sokolivka
- Staryi Kosiv
- Cherhanivka
- Shepit
- Sheshory
- Yavoriv
