= Kosiv Raion =

Subdivision of Ivano-Frankivsk Oblast, Ukraine

Kosiv Raion Косівський район
- Raion
- Kosivskyi raion
- Flag Coat of arms

- Interactive map of Kosiv Raion
- Coordinates: 48°19′32″N 24°59′13″E
- Country: Ukraine
- Oblast: Ivano-Frankivsk Oblast
- Established: 1939
- Admin. center: Kosiv
- Subdivisions: 5 hromadas

Government
  - Governor: Yaroslav Shynkaruk

Area
  - Total: 903 km^{2} (349 sq mi)

Population (2022)
  - Total: 83,700
  - Density: 92.7/km^{2} (240/sq mi)
- Time zone: UTC+2 (EET)
  - Summer (DST): UTC+3 (EEST)
- Postal index: 285250
- Area code: +380
- Website: Official website

Kosiv Raion (Ukrainian: Косівський район) is a raion (district) of Ivano-Frankivsk Oblast of Ukraine. The city of Kosiv is the administrative center of the raion. Its population is 83,700 (2022 estimate).

== Subdivisions ==
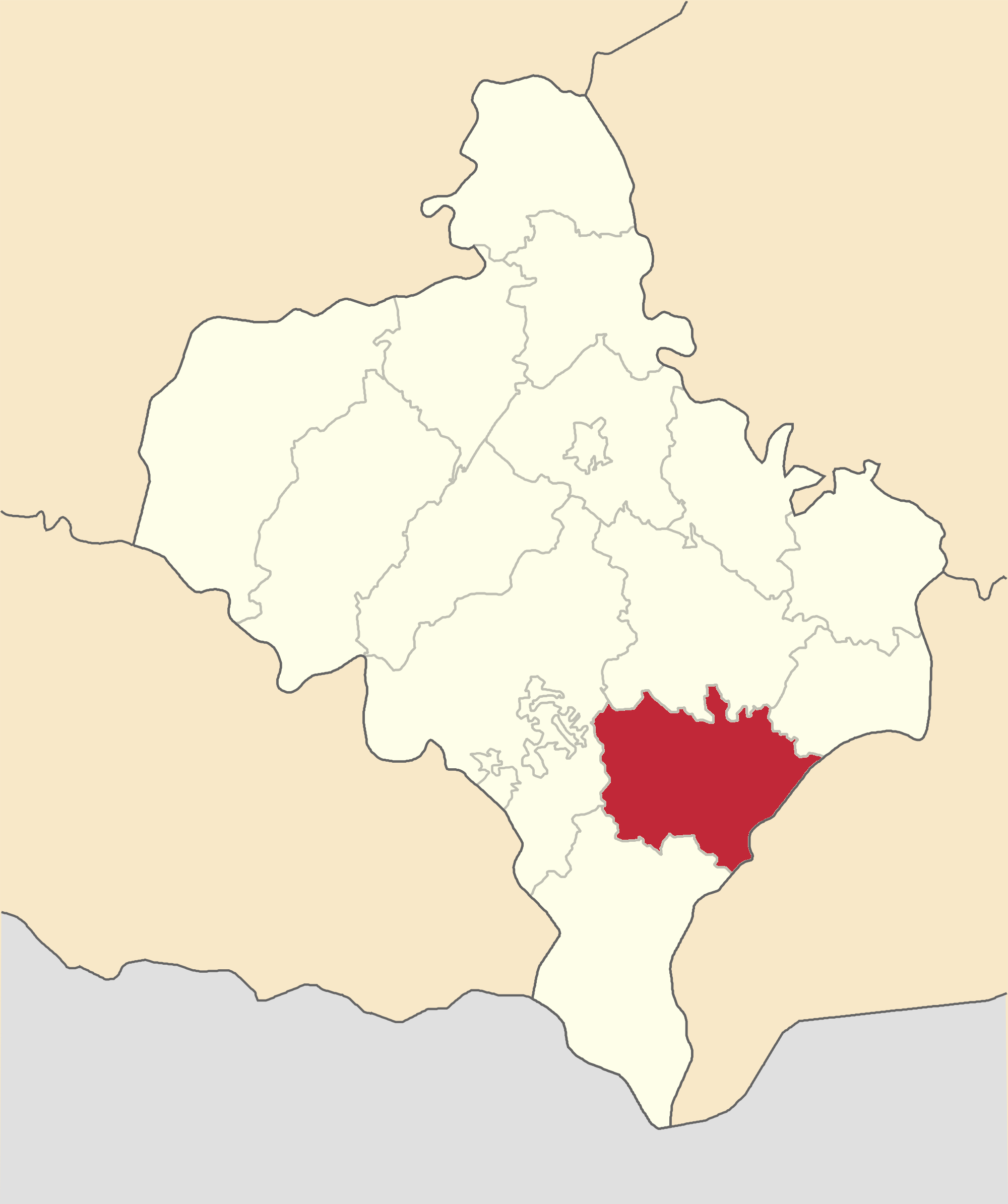
Kosiv Raion in Ivano-Frankivsk Oblast (1966-2020)

On 18 July 2020, as part of the administrative reform of Ukraine, the number of raions of Ivano-Frankivsk Oblast was reduced to six, however, the area of Kosiv Raion was essentially unchanged. The January 2020 estimate of the raion population was 86,615 (2020 est.)

Both before and after 2000, the raion consisted of five hromadas:

- Kosiv urban hromada with the administration in the city of Kosiv;
- Kosmach rural hromada with the administration in the selo of Kosmach;
- Kuty settlement hromada with the administration in the rural settlement of Kuty;
- Rozhniv rural hromada with the administration in the selo of Rozhniv;
- Yabluniv settlement hromada with the administration in the rural settlement of Yabluniv.

== General information ==
The district is located in the Precarpathian region of Ukraine. The total area is 903 km^{2} with 91,100 inhabitants.

The climate is moderately continental.

The mountains go up to 1000 m above the sea level in the mountainous part of the raion. There are a few big rivers among the mountains: Cheremosh — 80 km, Pistynka — 56 km, Rybnytsa — 54 km.

Archaeological finds show that the territory of the raion was inhabited from the Neolithic times. The first written information about Kosiv is from 1424. Firstly, the town was called Rykiv, and only later it was renamed to Kosiv. Other old settlements of the raion are Kobaky (15th century), Kuty (1448), Vyzhnii Bereziv (1412).

== Notable residents ==
Famous people that were born, lived or worked in Kosiv district:

- Marko Cheremshyna (1874–1927) was a Ukrainian writer of Hutsul background.
- Dmytro Pavlychko (1929–2023) is a Ukrainian poet, translator, scriptwriter, culturologist, political and public figure, and dissident.

== Sources ==
- Kosiv Raion Rada
- Kosiv Information
- Kosiv Art
