= Church of the Nativity of the Theotokos, Kryvorivnia =

Church in Ivano-Frankivsk Oblast, Ukraine

Church of the Nativity of the Theotokos
- Церква Різдва Пресвятої Богородиці
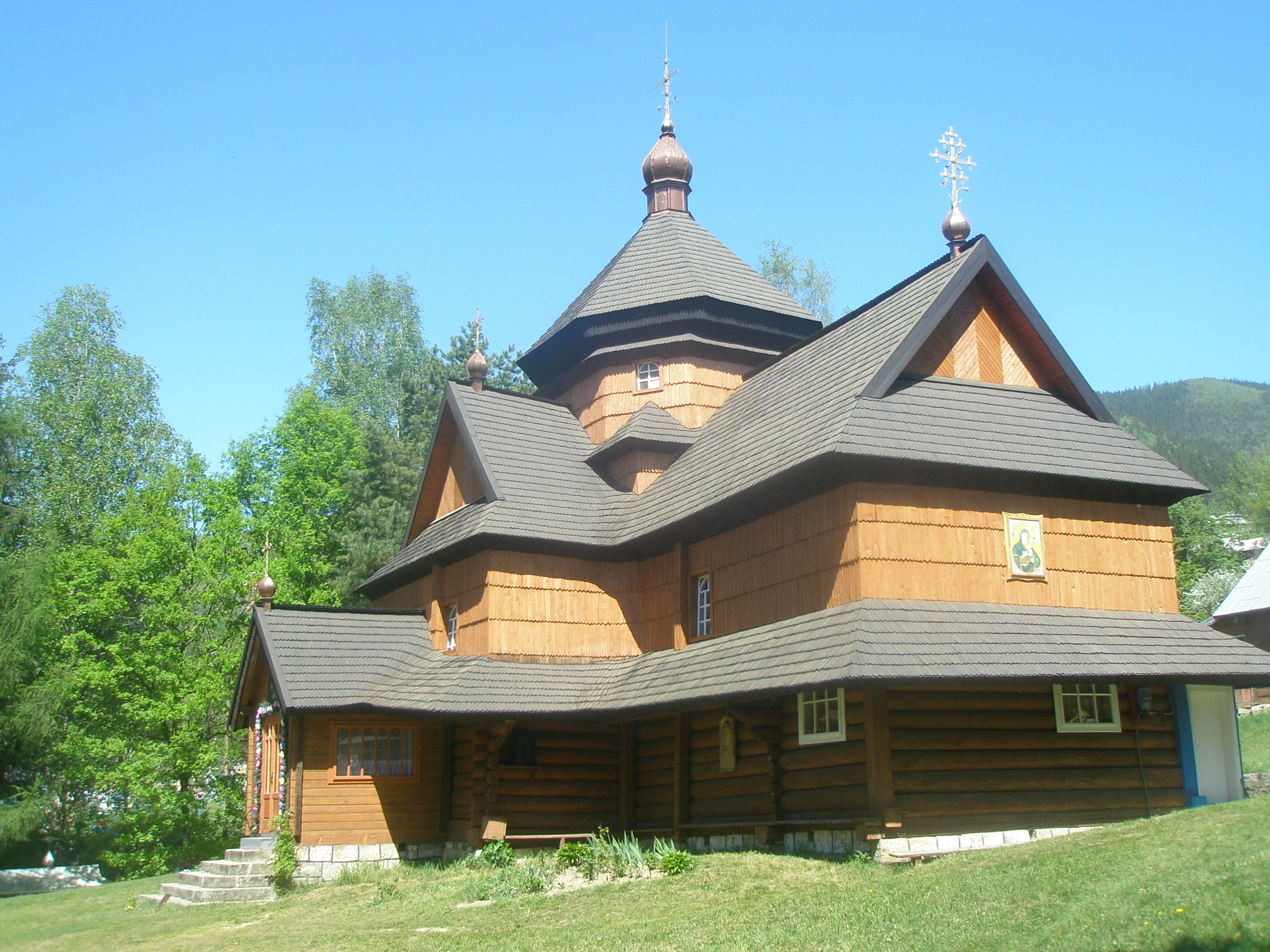
- Church of the OCU

Religion
- Affiliation: Orthodox Church of Ukraine

Location
- Location: Kryvorivnia, Verkhovyna settlement hromada, Verkhovyna Raion, Ivano-Frankivsk Oblast, Ukraine
- Interactive map of Church of the Nativity of the Theotokos
- Coordinates: 48°10′30″N 24°53′56″E

Architecture
- Completed: 1719

Immovable Monument of National Significance of Ukraine
- Official name: Церква Різдва та дзвіниця (дер.) (Church of the Nativity and its bell tower (wooden))
- Type: Architecture
- Reference no.: 090032

The Church of the Nativity of the Theotokos (Ukrainian: Церква Різдва Пресвятої Богородиці) is a parish church of the Orthodox Church of Ukraine (OCU) in Kryvorivnia of the Verkhovyna settlement hromada, Verkhovyna Raion, Ivano-Frankivsk Oblast, Ukraine, and an architectural monument of national importance.

== History ==
In the early 1660s, a wooden church was built, which in 1719 was moved to a hill on the left bank of the Cheremosh River. The first interior paintings were made in the 1730s. An ancient bell tower built in 1818 is located near the church.

During the ministry of priest Oleksa Volianskyi, the church was visited by Ukrainian cultural and state figures, including: Ivan Franko, Mykhailo Hrushevsky, Lesya Ukrainka, Volodymyr Hnatiuk, Yakiv Holovatsky, Hnat Khotkevych, Mykhailo Kotsiubynsky, and others.

In 1972, to protect the church from destruction, it was covered with tin, but in 2011, under the leadership of priest Ivan Rybaruk, the community re-covered the church with wood shingle, restoring its original authentic appearance. In 1956, on the initiative of Teodoziia Plytka-Sorokhan and Paraska Plytka-Horytsvit, a church choir was created (currently led by Hanna Bilak).

At one time, the church was used for the filming of the Ukrainian movie Shadows of Forgotten Ancestors (directed by Sergei Parajanov, cinematographer Yuri Ilyenko, and starring Ivan Mykolaichuk).

In 1901, Metropolitan Andrey Sheptytsky made a pastoral visit to the church. He wrote a message in the Hutsul language "To My Beloved Hutsuls". In June 1998 Patriarch Filaret of Kyiv and All Rus-Ukraine visited the parish. In 2017 and 2021, Bishop Yulian of Kolomyia and Kosiv paid an archpastoral visit to the Church.

The prayers were attended by President of Ukraine Viktor Yushchenko, Speaker of the Verkhovna Rada Andrii Porubii, U.S. Ambassador to Ukraine John F. Tefft and his family, Bishop Borys Gudziak, and well-known public figures, scholars, and artists Ivan Drach, Roman Ivanychuk, Yevhen Sverstiuk, and Vasyl Herasymiuk, Petro Kononenko, Mykola Ilnytskyi, Ruslana, Sviatoslav Vakarchuk, Mykola Kniazhytskyi, Maria Vlad, Raiisa Nedashkivska, Oles Sanin, Ihor Hyrych, Volodymyr Zubytskyi, Halyna Stefanova, Natalka Polovynka, Serhii Taruta, Vitalii Portnykov, Zinaida Lykhachova, and others.

== Priests ==
- Hryhorii Kropyvnytskyi (1775–1800),
- Petro Pavlovych (1800–1817),
- Mykhailo Volianskyi (1817–1818),
- Andrii Burachynskyi (1818–1871),
- Emilian Holovatskyi (1858–1864),
- Yosyp Burachynskyi (1864–1871),
- Oleksa Volianskyi (1893–1923),
- Mykhailo Bereziuk (1923–1925, 1927–1929, 1931, 1935),
- Yulian Hrankivskyi (1923–1927),
- Konrad Lahola (1926–1927),
- Stepan Hunchak (1929–1931),
- Ivan Ambroziak (1931–1934),
- Luka Dzioba (1935–1950),
- Mykhailo Mytropula (1950–1961),
- Myron Zhurakivskyi (1961–1964),
- Deacon Volodymyr Romaniuk (1961),
- Vasyl Yurchak (1964–1975),
- Dmytro Patarak (1975–1980),
- Myroslav Vintoniak (1980–1981),
- Mykola Shcherbatiuk (1981–1984),
- Bohdan Volochii (1984–1986),
- Nestor Dziubak (1986–1989),
- Vasyl Yuriv (1989–1990),
- Vasyl Kachur (1990–1995),
- Mykhailo Herheliuk (February–July 1995),
- Ivan Rybaruk (from 9 July 1995).

== Sources ==
- Анна-Лілія Кокора (2023-09-11). "Село, яке має два храмових свята". Локальна історія.
