= Ivan Rybaruk =

Ukrainian priest, writer (born 1966)

- Іван Рибарук
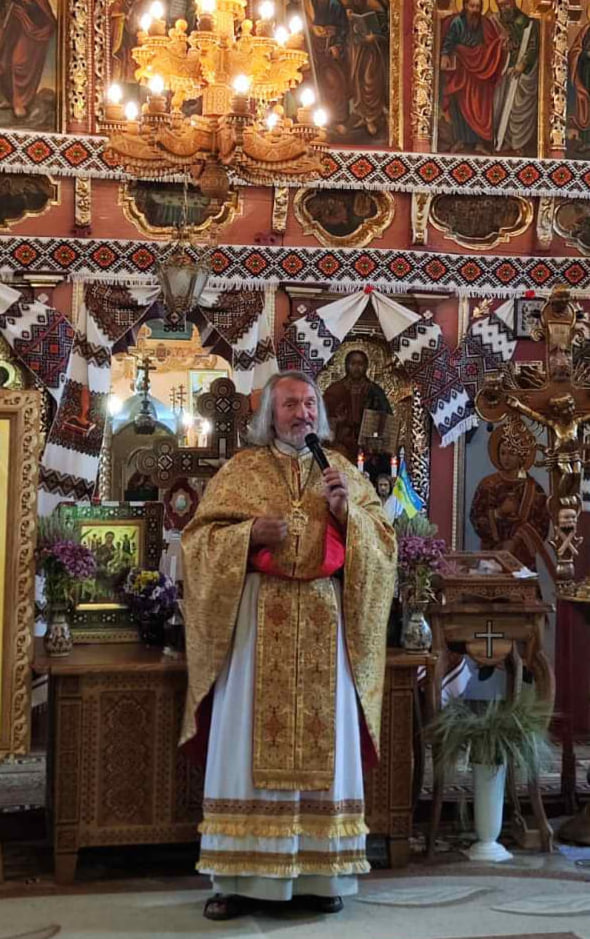
- Born: 16 April 1966 (age 60); Kryvopillia, Ivano-Frankivsk Oblast
- Education: Ukrainian Agricultural Academy, Ivano-Frankivsk Theological Seminary of the UOC-KP, Kyiv Orthodox Theological Academy
- Occupations: Priest, writer, editor, presenter

Ivan Vasylovych Rybaruk (Ukrainian: Іван Васильович Рибарук; born 16 April 1966) is a Ukrainian priest, writer, editor, presenter. Popularizer of the name of the Hutsul woman Paraska Plytka-Horytsvit.

== Biography ==
Ivan Rybaruk was born on 16 April 1966, in Kryvopillia, now the Verkhovyna Hromada of the Verkhovyna Raion, Ivano-Frankivsk Oblast, Ukraine.

=== Education ===
He studied at the Ukrainian Agricultural Academy (1988, majoring in animal husbandry), Ivano-Frankivsk Theological Seminary of the UOC-KP (1994), and Kyiv Orthodox Theological Academy (1998). He worked at the Kotsiubynskyi collective farm and the district executive committee in Verkhovyna.

=== Church ministry ===
On 18 June 1995, Metropolitan Andrii Abramchuk of Halychyna was ordained a deacon, and on 2 July of the same year he was ordained a priest.

On 9 July 1995, he was appointed rector of the Church of the Nativity of the Theotokos in Kryvorivnia, Verkhovyna Raion. In 2011, he initiated the restoration of the shingle roof of the wooden shrine.

In 1997–2014, he was the head of the Information and Publishing Department of the Kolomyia Eparchy of the OCU. Currently, he is the editor of the Orthodox magazine of the Hutsul and Pokuttya regions "Loza Vynohradna"; he hosts the radio program "Zustrich z bohom" on the district radio. Participant of national, international and regional religious and scientific conferences.

=== Family ===
He is married and has four children with his wife Oksana.

== Works ==
Author of the books Tse duzhe vazhlyvo (2010), Nevista Hospodnia (2013), and Zhyty z Khrystom (2015).

== Awards ==
- Laureate of the Andrey Sheptytsky Ivano-Frankivsk Regional Prize in the nomination "spiritual printed word" (2015),
- Laureate of the V Pokrova Literary Festival named after Taras Melnychuk (2013),
- Pectoral cross (1997),
- Cross with decorations and a Blessed Patriarchal Letter (2005).

== Sources ==
- Наталя Мостова (2017-07-04). "Іван Рибарук". Галицький кореспондент.
- Тетяна Калениченко (2017-10-04). "Від атеїста до священика на Гуцульщині. Досвід о. Івана Рибарука з Криворівні". RISU.
