= Kryvopillia =

Rural locality in Ivano-Frankivsk Oblast, Ukraine

Kryvopillia Кривопілля
- Location in Ivano-Frankivsk Oblast
- Coordinates: 48°11′41″N 24°41′46″E
- Country: Ukraine
- Oblast: Ivano-Frankivsk Oblast
- Raion: Verkhovyna Raion
- Hromada: Verkhovyna settlement hromada
- Time zone: UTC+2 (EET)
  - Summer (DST): UTC+3 (EEST)
- Postal code: 78706

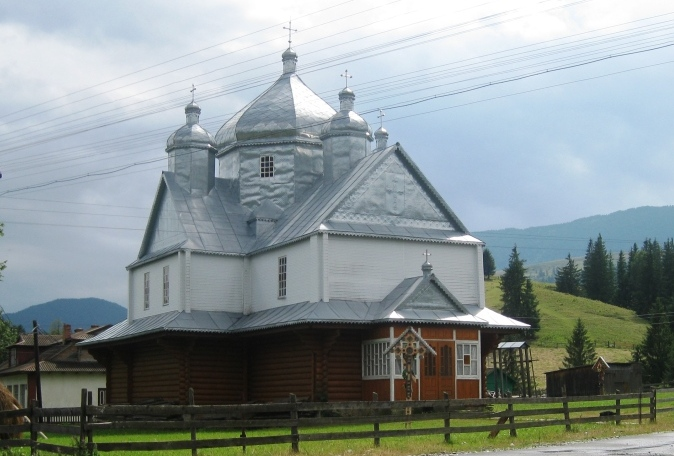

Kryvopillia (Ukrainian: Кривопілля) is a village in the Verkhovyna settlement hromada of the Verkhovyna Raion of Ivano-Frankivsk Oblast in Ukraine.

== History ==
On 19 July 2020, as a result of the administrative-territorial reform and liquidation of the Verkhovyna Raion, the village became part of the newly formed Verkhovyna Raion.

== Notable residents ==
- Ivan Rybaruk (born 1966), Ukrainian priest, writer, editor, presenter

== Sources ==
- "informacja o wsi w haśle Żabie, powiat kosowski". Geographical Dictionary of the Kingdom of Poland (in Polish). 14. Warszawa: Kasa im. Józefa Mianowskiego. 1895. p. 712.
