= Mykhailo Halushchynskyi =

Ukrainian educator and politician

- Михайло Галущинський
- Mykhailo Halushchynskyi in a Ukrainian Sich Riflemen uniform
- Born: 26 September 1878; Zvyniach, Kingdom of Galicia and Lodomeria, Austria-Hungary
- Died: 25 September 1931 (aged 52); Lviv, Second Polish Republic
- Resting place: Lychakiv Cemetery
- Education: University of Lviv; University of Vienna
- Occupations: Educator, military officer, politician
- Relatives: Teodosii Halushchynskyi

Mykhailo Halushchynskyi (Ukrainian: Михайло Галущинський; 26 September 1878 – 25 September 1931) was a Ukrainian educator and political activist, who served as the first commander of Ukrainian Sich Riflemen during World War I and later became the leader of Prosvita educational society.

== Biography ==
=== Early life and teaching career ===
Mykhailo Halushchynskyi was born on 26 September 1878 in Zvyniach, Chortkiv district (modern-day Ternopil Oblast of Ukraine. His father Mykola Halushchynskyi, a Greek Catholic clergyman, served as a parish priest in Yazlovets. Like his father and four brothers Tyt, Ivan, Mykola and Oles, Mykhailo was homeschooled, and later attended the Basilian gymnasium in Buchach. After graduating, he entered a gymnasium in Ternopil, joining the local underground Ukrainian student community. Between 1898 and 1900 Halushchynskyi studied philosophy at the University of Lviv. During that time he headed the a Ukrainian academic community organization, and contributed to publication of the first Ukrainian student magazine. In 1900-1901 he transferred to Vienna University, taking part in the activities of Ukrainian Sich student society.

After finishing his studies, Halushchynskyi returned to Galicia, and in 1904-1909 worked as a teacher at a gymnasium in Zolochiv. In 1909 he was appointed head of Saint Volodymyr Gymnasium in Rohatyn. Under his leadership, the gymnasium became a major centre of culture and education, employing notable figures such as Ivan Krypiakevych and Antin Krushelnytskyi. Halishchynskyi promoted self-government by students and contributed to the activities of Sich and Plast youth organizations.

=== World War I and aftermath ===
Halushchynskyi (right) with fellow members of Ukrainian Sich Riflemen command in 1914

With the start of World War I, Halushchynskyi was moblilized into the Austro-Hungarian Army as a reserve officer. In an unexpected move, he was nominated to head the Legion of Ukrainian Sich Riflemen, despite having no military experience. Halushchynskyi's authority in leading the first Ukrainian military unit of the modern era benefitted from his discipline and readiness to take responsibility, as well as ability to efficiently communicate with representatives of Austrian authorities. Additionally, Halushchynskyi was seen as a compromise figure due to not being a member of any political party.

On 17 August 1914 Halushchynskyi was officially appointed to serve as commandant of Ukrainian Sich Riflemen. On that post, he took responsibility for creating the unit's basic infrastructure in order to prepare it to management by professional military officers. In March 1915 Halushchynskyi was relieved from his position, transferring command to Hryts Kossak. Until late 1917 he remained part of the Legion's staff, taking responsibility for military communications with supreme command of the Austrian army and attaining the rank of kurin otaman.

Following the dissolution of Austria-Hungary, Halushchynskyi took part in the November Uprising and the following battle for Lviv on the side of West Ukrainian People's Republic. After the defeat of Ukrainian forces, he remained in Lviv, returning to work as educator and political activist.

=== Political career ===
During the early 1920s Halushchynskyi obtained several teaching positions, and in 1921-1924 took part in the activities of Ukrainian Secret University. In 1923 he was elected head of the Prosvita society, and remained on that position until his death. Due to his opposition to a government decree which limited Ukrainian-language education, in 1924 Halushchynskyi was relieved from state service. In 1925 he became one of the co-founders of Ukrainian National Democratic Alliance (UNDO), and in 1928 was elected a member of the Polish Senate, serving as its deputy marshal. On that position Halushchynskyi headed the Senate commission on culture and education, defending the rights of Ukrainians for own schooling and national identity. In 1930 he was elected to the Sejm as a representative of the Ukrainian-Belarusian bloc.

During the early 1930s Halushchynskyi became one of the leaders of UNDO along with Ostap Lutskyi and Vasyl Mudryi. Looking for a compromise with Polish authorities, in February 1931 he took part in negotiations with the pro-government Nonpartisan Bloc for Cooperation with the Government. Despite his criticism of Polish government's policies in respect to ethnic minorities, Halushchynskyi's position was seen by many representatives of Ukrainian youth as too conciliatory, and there were calls for him to resign from leadership in the Prosvita society. Halushchynskyi suddenly died in Lviv on the night of 25 September 1931 and was buried at Lychakiv Cemetery. In 2001 his remains were moved to the memorial of Ukrainian Sich Riflemen and Ukrainian Galician Army at the same cemetery.

== Publications ==
Halushchynskyi authored a number of works of pedagogical topics. Between 1927 and 1931, he served as chief editor of the monthly Zhyttia i Znannia ("Life and Knowledge") issued by the Prosvita society. In 1934, his book of memoirs With Ukrainian Sich Riflemen (З Українськими Січовими Стрільцями) was published posthumously.
