= Oleksa Volianskyi =

Ukrainian priest, ethnographer, cultural and educational activist

- Олекса Волянський
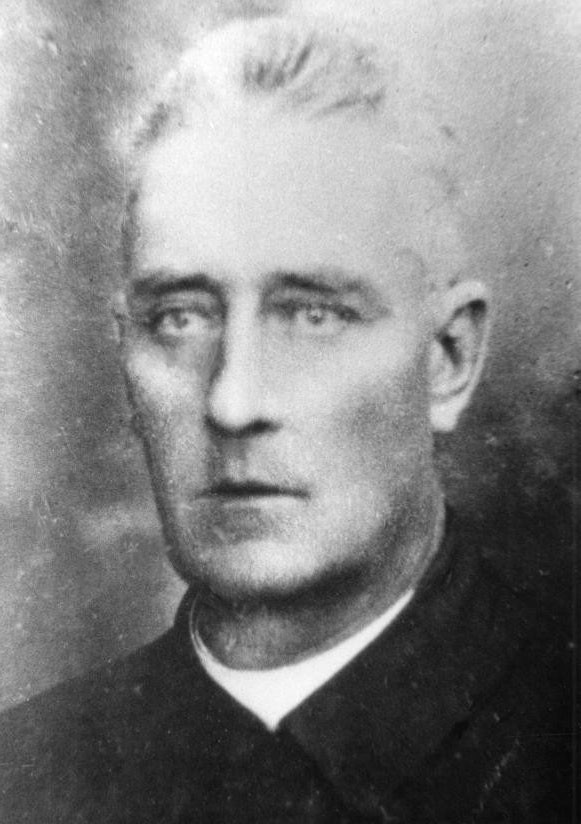
- Born: 7 October 1862; Zvyniach, Austria-Hungary
- Died: 2 March 1947 (aged 84); Sokolivka, Stanyslaviv Oblast
- Education: Lviv Theological Seminary

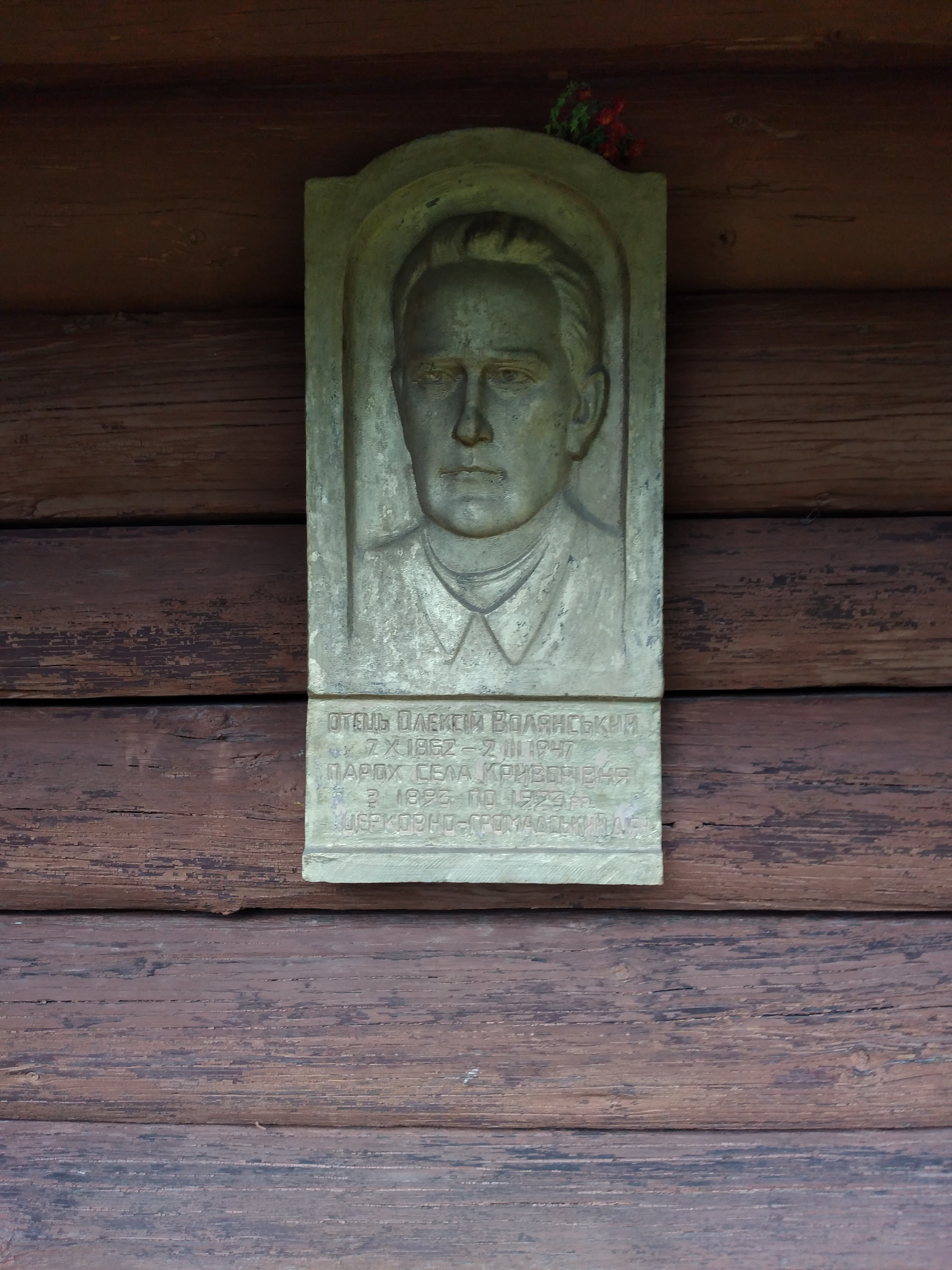
A bas-relief with a memorial plaque in honor of Father Oleksa Volianskyi on the facade of the Church of the Nativity of the Virgin Mary in Kryvorivnia, where he served from 1893 to 1923.

Oleksa Mykolaiovych Volianskyi (Ukrainian: Олекса Миколайович Волянський; 7 October 1862 – 2 March 1947) was a Ukrainian priest, ethnographer, cultural and educational activist. Full member of the Shevchenko Scientific Society (1905).

== Biography ==
Oleksa Volianskyi was born on 7 October 1862, in Zvyniach, now Bilobozhnytsia rural hromada in the Chortkiv Raion of the Ternopil Oblast, to at. Mykola Volianskyi and Pavlina of Borovskyi's family.

Graduated from the Lviv Theological Seminary. He served in parishes in the town of Tovste (1887–1889, employee, now a village in Chortkiv Raion), Siret (1889–1893, administrator, now Romania), Kryvorivnia (1893–1923, now Verkhovyna Raion), and Sokolivka (since 1923, now Kosiv Raion).

Head of the Prosvita reading society in Kryvorivnia. It is known that at. Oleksa Volianskyi helped Volodymyr Shukhevych collect materials for a book about the Hutsul region. He had a large library and archive, which were burned by Russian officers during World War I.

His home in Kryvorivnia was visited by Ivan Franko, Lesya Ukrainka, Mykhailo Hrushevsky, Volodymyr Hnatiuk, Hnat Khotkevych, Vasyl Stefanyk, Mykhailo Kotsiubynsky, Olha Kobylianska, Antin Krushelnytsky, Ivan Krypiakevych, Oleksandr Oles, Marko Cheremshyna, Yevhen Tymchenko, Ivan Trush, Andrey Sheptytsky, Hryhoriy Khomyshyn, and others.

He corresponded with I. Franko, V. Hnatiuk, and M. Kotsiubynsky. He left memories of I. Franko, M. Kotsiubynsky and others. Letters to V. Hnatiuk are kept in the Vasyl Stefanyk Lviv National Scientific Library of Ukraine.

Died on 2 March 1947 in Sokolivka, Kosiv Raion, where he was buried.

== Family ==
In 1886, he married Mariia Burachynska, the daughter of a priest, at. Andrii Burachynskyi from Kryvorivnia. They had three children – Volodymyra, Roman, and Kekyliia.

== Honoring the memory ==
Memorial plaques in honor of at. Oleksa Volianskyi were installed on the facades of churches in Kryvorivnia and Sokolivka.

On the occasion of the 155th anniversary of the birth of Oleksa Volianskyi:

- 2012 was proclaimed the "Year of Oleksa Volianskyi" in Ivano-Frankivsk Oblast;
- At the initiative of the NGO Zelenyi Svit, a Carpathian yew tree was planted in honor of at. Volianskyi in Zvyniach, Chortkiv Raion, as well as linden trees in Kryvorivnia and Sokolivka.
