= Iltsi =

Iltsi Ільці
- Village
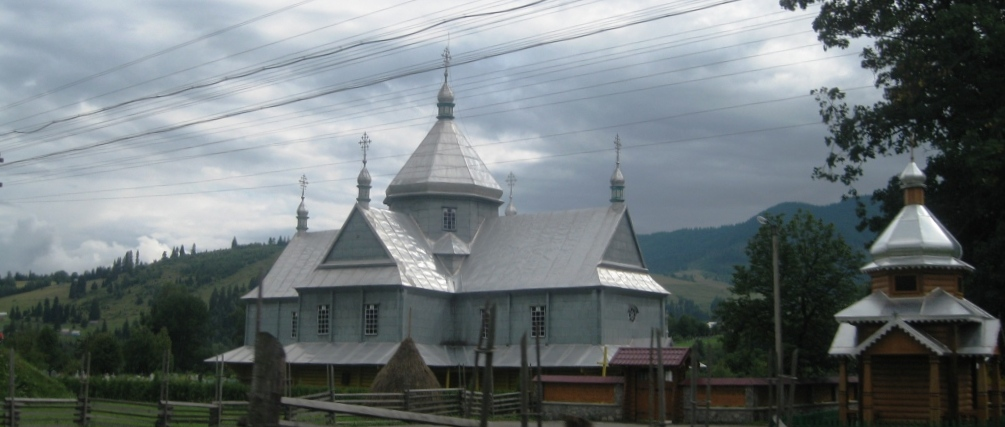

- Location in Ivano-Frankivsk Oblast Location in Ukraine
- Coordinates: 48°09′11″N 24°45′36″E
- Country: Ukraine
- Oblast: Ivano-Frankivsk Oblast
- Raion: Verkhovyna Raion
- Elevation: 2,106 ft (642 m)

Population (2001)
  - Total: 1,649
- Time zone: UTC+2 (EET)
  - Summer (DST): UTC+3 (EEST)
- Postal code: 78704
- Area code: +380 03432

Iltsi (Ukrainian: Ільці) is a village in Verkhovyna Raion, Ivano-Frankivsk Oblast, Ukraine. It forms part of Verkhovyna settlement hromada, one of the hromadas of Ukraine.

== Geography ==
The Zhabivska and Iltsia rivers flow through the village – the right and left tributaries of the Chornyi Cheremosh.

The village consists of hamlets: Flesivka, Holytsi, Tsentr, Firas, Pidpohar, Velykyi Zatinok and Malyi Zatinok. The small village of Khodak also belongs to the Iltsi Starostyn district.

From the village, you can climb Mount Pohar (1,320 m), which offers a picturesque view of the area and the Chornohora Range.

== History ==
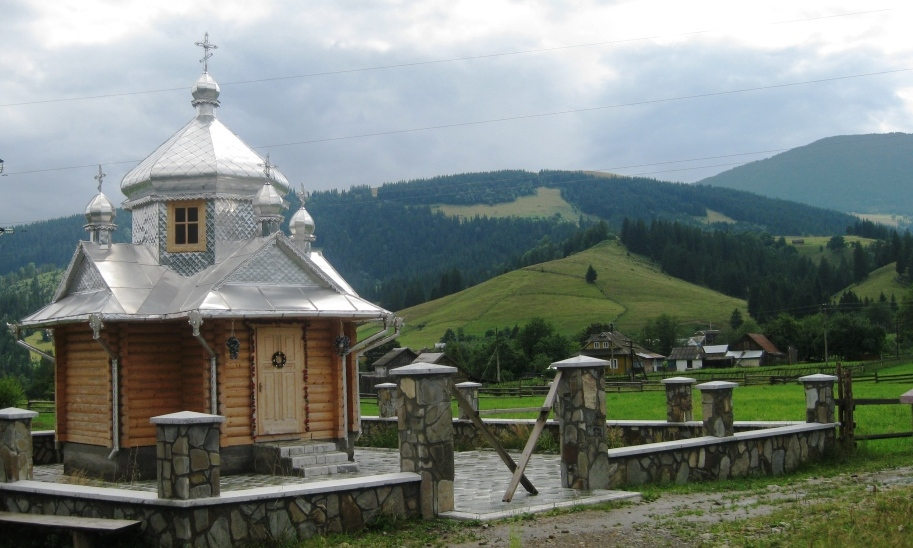
Chapel in Iltsi

The first mention of the village of Iltsi dates back to 1745. Researchers of the name of the village believe that the name comes from the river Iltsia (or Iltsivka), which originates in Volova. It was here that, according to folk tales, the leader of the opryshks, Iliuk, lived. Information about the history of the village is scarce, it is known that until 1962 Iltsi was part of Zhabie, and since 1993 it was separated into a separate administrative unit.

On 12 June 2020, Iltsi formed the Verkhovyna settlement hromada together with other settlements.

== Demographics ==
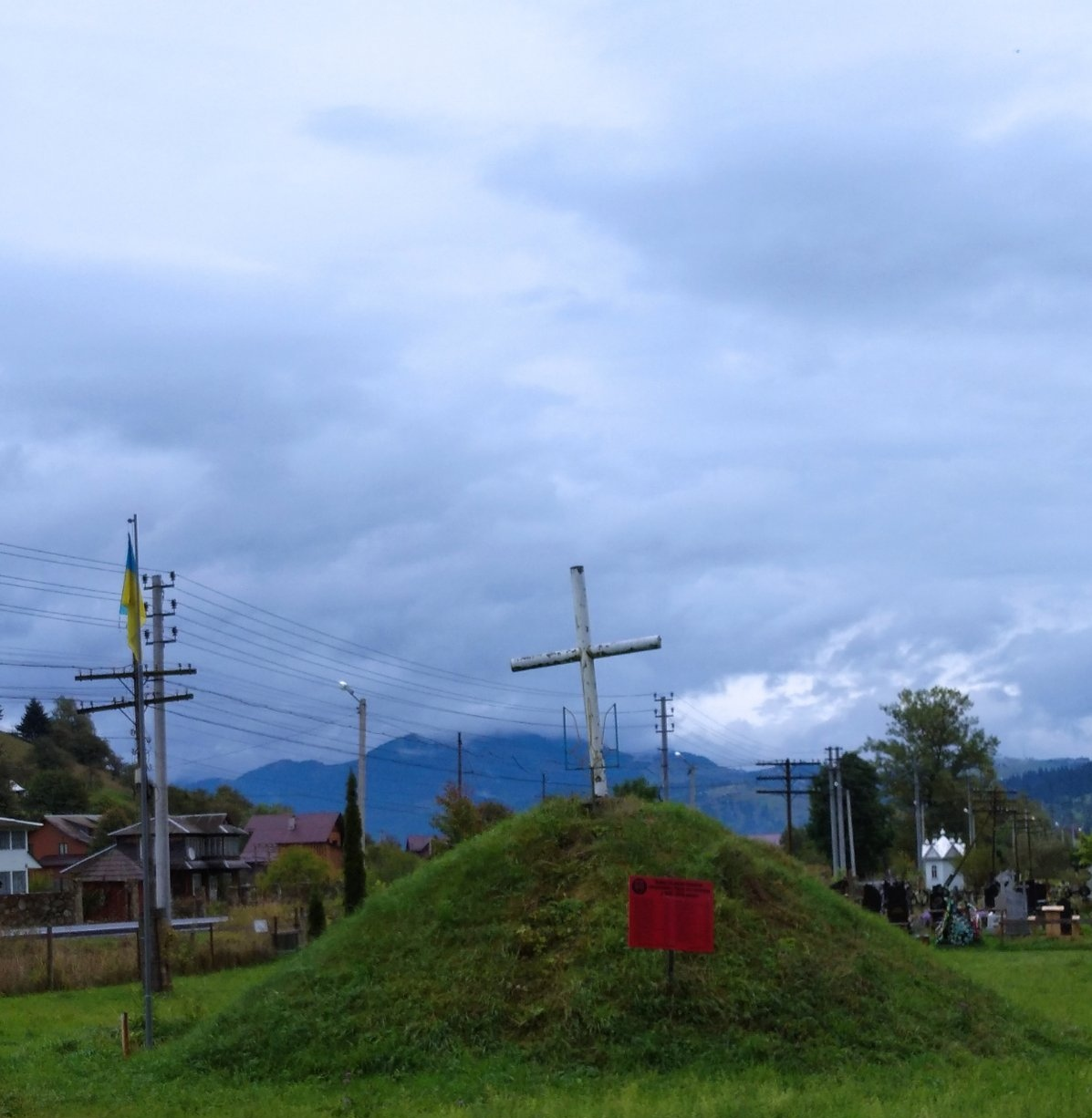
Symbolic grave of USR soldiers

According to eyewitnesses, at the beginning of the 19th century, approximately 10 Jewish families lived in Iltsi.

According to the 1989 census, the population of Iltsi was 1,484 people, of whom 685 were men and 799 were women. According to the 2001 census, 1,649 people lived in the village.

Native language as of the Ukrainian Census of 2001:

| Language | Percentage |
|---|---|
| Ukrainian | 99.58% |
| Russian | 0.42% |

== Museums ==
- There is a modern visitor center in the village. The exposition in the museum reflects the richness of the nature of the Carpathians, its flora and fauna, phenomena and facts.
- The museum, which was founded in the village of Halynka Verkhovynka in her own estate. The museum collects embroidered clothes and household items from all over the Hutsulshchyna. You can also buy local souvenirs at the manor: poetry collections of poets, dried apples, traditional hoops, fragrant honey, and more.
- Museum of mushrooms, where you are invited to learn about the peculiarities of mushrooms and prepare mushroom soup.

== Notable residents ==
- Dmytro Bilinchuk (1919–1953) was a military figure, commander of the Bohdan Khmelnytskyi UIA hundred in the "Victory" kuren, referent of the Security Council of the Kosiv supra-district command of the Ukrainian People's Republic of Ukraine, a knight of the Bronze Cross of the UPA for combat merit.
- Mykhailo Bilinchuk is a political prisoner, a participant in the Norilsk uprising.
- Halynka Verkhovynka (real name is Halyna Yatsentiuk, 1962) is a Ukrainian poet, collector of folk folklore and Carpathian antiquities
- Mykola Tkachuk (1990–2015) was a soldier of the Armed Forces of Ukraine, who died during the Russo-Ukrainian War. On 30 September 2016, a commemorative plaque to graduate Mykola Tkachuk was unveiled at the Iltsi Secondary School.
