= Anatoly Shvidenko =

Russian forest scientist (born 1937)

Anatoly Zinov'evich Shvidenko
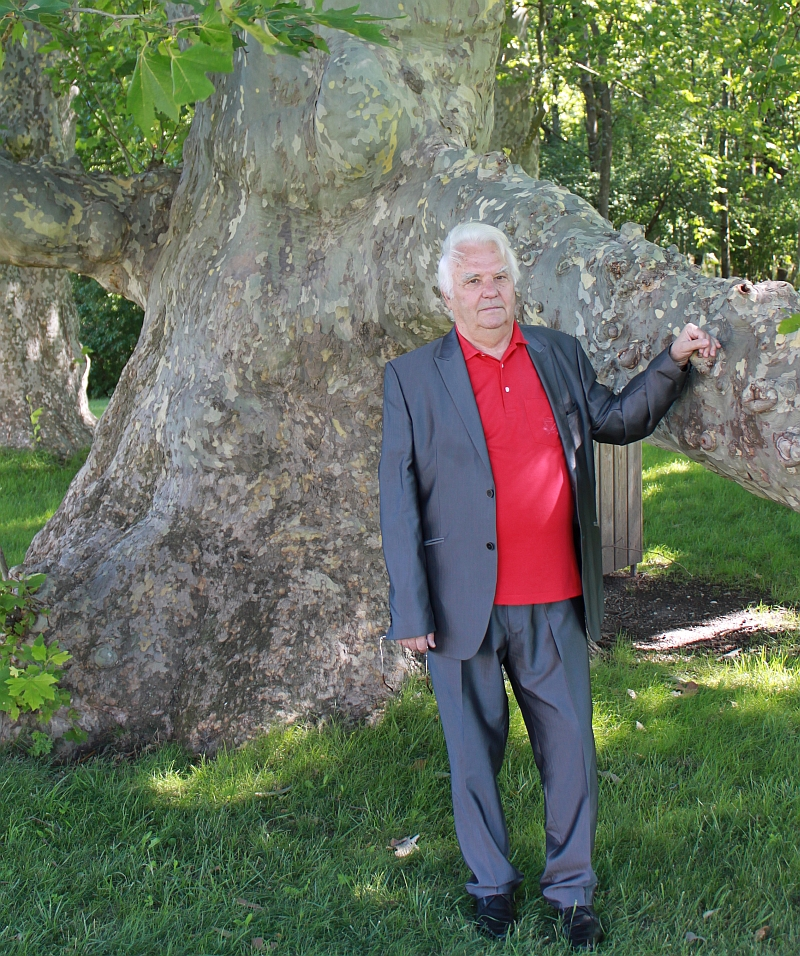
- Born: September 20, 1937 (age 89); Zhashkiv Raion, Cherkasy Oblast, Ukraine
- Education: National University of Life and Environmental Sciences of Ukraine
- Known for: Full carbon account of Russian terrestrial ecosystems
- Scientific career
- Fields: Forestry, ecology, mathematics
- Workplaces: IIASA

Anatoly Shvidenko (Russian: Анато́лий Зино́вьеич Швидéнко) is a doctor of Biological sciences, professor, and senior research Scholar at the International Institute for Applied Systems Analysis, Austria.

Anatoly Shvidenko worked at the National University of Life and Environmental Sciences of Ukraine from 1968 to 1987, where he headed the Department of Forestry Inventory and Planning. He joined the IIASA's Forestry Program in October 1992 and has been principal investigator in a number of projects on the forest sector of Northern Eurasia, including projects financed by the European Commission, European Space Agency, and other international organizations (such as Siberia, Siberia-II, GSE-FM, IRIS, Enviro-RISK, and Zapas).

Professor Shvidenko's main fields of interest are forest inventory, monitoring, mathematical modeling, global change, and boreal forests. He served as lead author and coordinating lead author in the Third Millennium Ecosystem Assessment and in the second, third, and fourth IPCC Assessments (the work of the IPCC, including the contributions of many scientists, was recognised by the joint award of the 2007 Nobel Peace Prize).

He has taken part in a number of important international global change activities and initiatives as member of steering committees and councils (Global Terrestrial Observing System Terrestrial Carbon Observation Panel, FAO Forest Resource Assessment, International Boreal Forest Research Association, Scientific Council of the World Commission on Forestry and Sustainable Development, Siberian National Committee on IGBP, etc.) Shvidenko is a member of the Board of International Boreal Research Association (IBFRA).

== Bibliography ==
He has authored and coauthored over 400 scientific publications, including 14 books in English, Russian and Ukrainian languages. h-index of articles in English is 51.

- Shvidenko A., Ciais P., Patra P.K., Bastos A., Maksyutov S., et al. (2025). A System Reanalysis of the Current Greenhouse Gases Budget of Terrestrial Ecosystems in Russia. Global Biogeochemical Cycles. 39 (10), e2025GB008540. 10.1029/2025GB008540.
- Pan Y., Birdsey R.A., Phillips O.L., Houghton R.A., Fang J., Kauppi P.E., Keith H., Kurz W.A., Ito A., Lewis S.L., Nabuurs G.-J., Shvidenko A., Hashimoto S., Lerink B., Schepaschenko D., et al. (2024). The enduring world forest carbon sink. Nature 631 (8021), 563–569. 10.1038/s41586-024-07602-x.
- Gauthier S.; Bernier P.; Kuuluvainen T.; Shvidenko A.Z.; Schepaschenko D.G. (2015). "Boreal forest health and global change". Science. 349 (6250): 819–822. Bibcode:2015Sci...349..819G. doi:10.1126/science.aaa9092. PMID 26293953. S2CID 206636351. Cited 12 times
- Pan Y.; Birdsey R.; Fang J.; Houghton R.; Kauppi P.; Kurz W.; Phillips O.; Shvidenko A.; et al. (2011). "A Large and Persistent Carbon Sink in the World's Forests". Science. 333 (6045): 988–93. Bibcode:2011Sci...333..988P. doi:10.1126/science.1201609. PMID 21764754. S2CID 42458151. Cited 124 times
- Shvidenko A.Z.; Schepaschenko D.G.; Vaganov E.A.; et al. (2011). "Impact of Wildfire in Russia between 1998–2010 on Ecosystems and the Global Carbon Budget" (PDF). Doklady Earth Sciences. 441 (2): 1678–1682. doi:10.1134/S1028334X11120075. S2CID 140171828. Archived from the original (PDF) on August 16, 2012.
- Shvidenko A.; Schepaschenko D.; Nilsson S.; et al. (2007). "Semi-empirical models for assessing biological productivity of Northern Eurasian forests". Ecological Modelling. 204 (1–2): 163–179. doi:10.1016/j.ecolmodel.2006.12.040.
- Lapenis A.; Shvidenko A.; Schepaschenko D.; et al. (2005). "Acclimation of Russian forests to recent changes in climate". Global Change Biology. 11 (12): 2090–2102. Bibcode:2005GCBio..11.2090L. doi:10.1111/j.1365-2486.2005.001069.x. PMID 34991283. S2CID 245801911.
- Shvidenko A.; Nilsson S. (2003). "A synthesis of the impact of Russian forests on the global carbon budget for 1961–1998" (PDF). Tellus B. 55 (2): 391–415. doi:10.1034/j.1600-0889.2003.00046.x. Cited 97 times
- Goodale C.L.; Apps M.J.; Birdsey R.A.; Field C.B.; Heath L.S.; Houghton R.A.; Jenkins J.C.; Kohlmaier G.H.; Kurz W.; Liu S.; Nabuurs G.-J.; Nilsson S.; Shvidenko A.Z. (2002). "Forest carbon sinks in the Northern Hemisphere". Ecological Applications. 12 (3): 891–899. doi:10.1890/1051-0761(2002)012[0891:FCSITN]2.0.CO;2. ISSN 1051-0761. Cited 396 times
- Nilsson S.; Shvidenko A.; Stolbovoi V.; et al. (2000). Full carbon account for Russia (PDF). Laxenburg, Austria: IIASA Interim Report IR-00-021. p. 191. Cited 126 times
- Nilsson S.; Shvidenko A. (1998). "Is sustainable development of the Russian forest sector possible?". Iufro Occasional Paper. IUFRO: 83. ISSN 1024-414X.
- Shvidenko, A. & Nilsson, S. (1994). "What do we know about the Siberian forests?". Ambio. 23 (7): 396–404. doi:10.1126/science.1201609. PMID 21764754. S2CID 42458151. Cited 74 times
