= Zvyniach =

Rural locality in Ternopil Oblast, Ukraine

Zvyniach Звиняч
- Location in Ternopil Oblast
- Coordinates: 49°07′35″N 25°40′54″E
- Country: Ukraine
- Oblast: Ternopil Oblast
- Raion: Chortkiv Raion
- Hromada: Bilobozhnytsia Hromada
- Time zone: UTC+2 (EET)
  - Summer (DST): UTC+3 (EEST)
- Postal code: 48510

Zvyniach (Ukrainian: Звиняч; Polish: Zwiniacz) is a village in Ukraine, Ternopil Oblast, Chortkiv Raion, Bilobozhnytsia rural hromada.

== History ==
The first written mention dates back to 1549. Polish archaeologist Bohdan Janusz, based on bronze items found in the village, suggested that it was one of the settlements of the Early Bronze Age culture. Archaeological sites of Trypillian, Komarivsko-Tshynets, Cherniakhiv, Prague, and Old Rus cultures, as well as Roman coins, have been discovered near Zvyniach.

== Religion ==
- Church of the Nativity of the Blessed Virgin Mary (OCU, 1921, brick)
- Chapel of the Nativity of the Blessed Virgin Mary (UGCC, 1922)
- Church of Saint Francis Xavier (RCC, 1904)

== People ==
- Oleksa Volianskyi (1862–1947), Ukrainian priest, ethnographer, cultural and educational activist
- Mykhailo Halushchynskyi (1878–1931), Ukrainian educator, military officer, publicist, cultural, educational, and social and political activist
- Stepan Kostyshyn (1932–2022), Ukrainian academician, scientist in the field of biology, long-time rector of the Yuriy Fedkovych Chernivtsi University, now the Yuriy Fedkovych National University
- Mykhailo Fedyk (born 1950) is an honored architect of Ukraine
