= Viktor Boiko =

Ukrainian politician

- Віктор Бойко
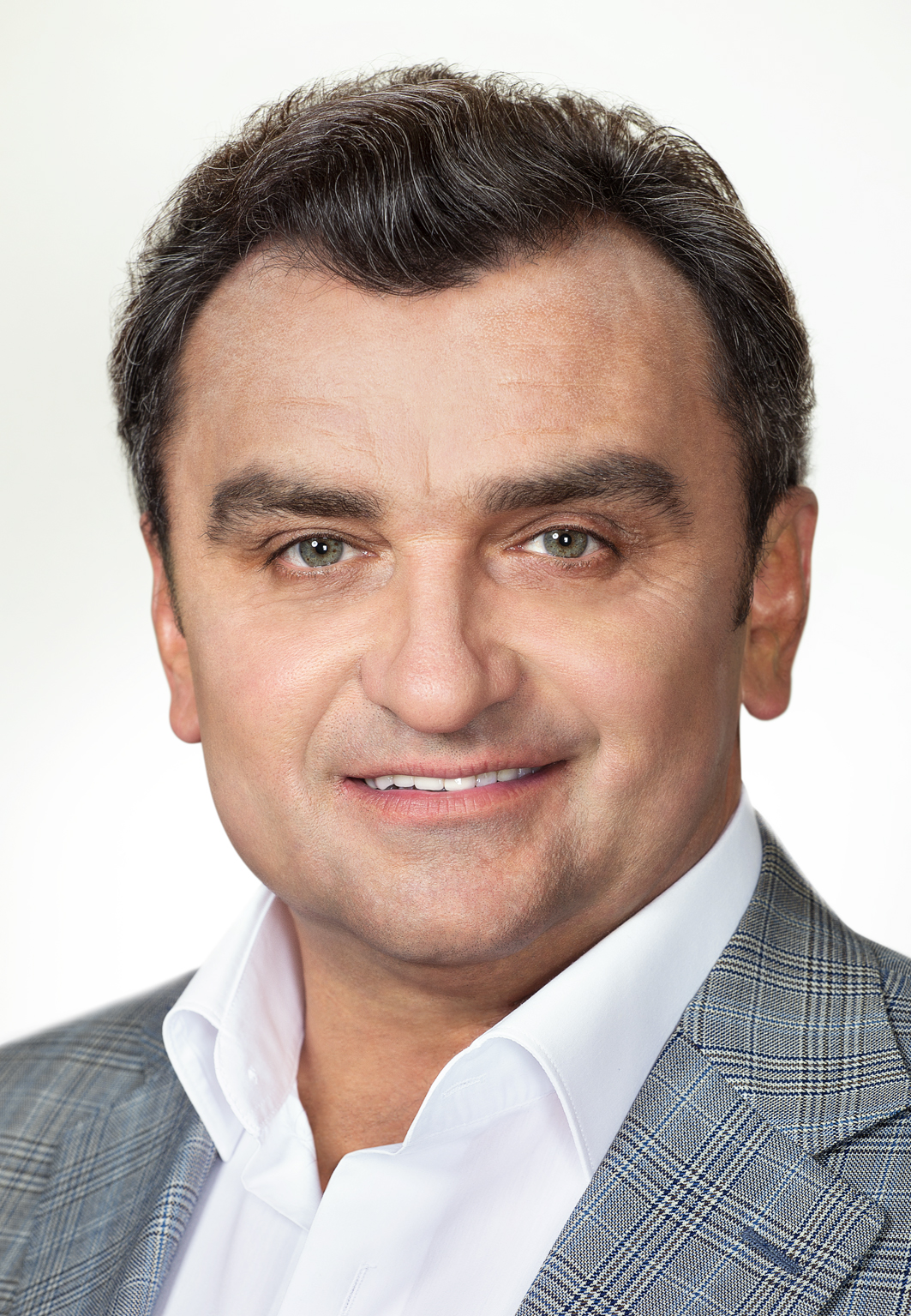

People's Deputy

Ukrainian Verkhovna Rada 4th convocation
- In office 14 May 2002 – 25 May 2006
- Constituency: People's Party

The members of

Kyiv City Council
- Incumbent
- Assumed office 2010
- Constituency: Voting district 91

Personal details
- Born: 6 July 1961 (age 65) Krasnohirka Holovanivsk Raion, Ukrainian SSR, Soviet Union
- Education: National Academy of State Administration

Viktor Oleksiyovych Boiko (Ukrainian: Віктор Олексійович Бойко) is a Ukrainian politician. He is the former Minister of Environmental Protection of Ukraine and a former Deputy Ministry of Agrarian Policy and Food. He was a member of the People's Party political executive committee.

== Early life ==
Boiko was born on 6 July 1961 in Krasnohirka Holovanivsk Raion to a family of farmers. He married Iryna Mykolayivna in 1961. They have two daughters Maryna (1986) and Tetiana (1989).

He studied at the Kirovohrad College of Agricultural Mechanization (1980); Ukrainian Agricultural Academy (1985). He became an electrical engineer, studying at the National Academy of State Administration of the President of Ukraine (2004).

== Career ==
He was the master of the power engineer department of Ukrremtrest of Derzhkomsilhosptekhnika in Kyiv City. He served in the military for 18 months. He worked as an engineer and executive at Agromash, rising to the position Director General. He served as an advisor to the State leasing company and NJSC Ukragroleasing. He served as deputy chairman of Verkhovna Rada Committee on Environmental Policy, Management of nature and Chernobyl disaster consequences. He served as chair of the State Committee of Ukraine for State Material Reserve. He served as the Deputy Minister of Agrarian Policy of Ukraine and as the Minister of Environmental Protection before becoming a deputy of the Kyiv City Council.

From 2002 to 2006 he moved among various factions and parties, as an adviser and a candidate. He served on the Management of nature and Chernobyl disaster consequences committee beginning in June 2002 and became the Deputy Head in 2004.

== Accomplishments ==
Viktor Boiko earned his fortune before he engaged in political activities.

As chairman of the State Committee of Ukraine for State Material Reserve he

- initiated a comprehensive inspection of the State Committee of Ukraine for State Material Reserve discovering arrears in the amount 7 bln. UAH;
- increased grain exports to about 400,000 tons in 2003–2004 and opened more than 4,000 stores where low-income families could buy sugar and flour for the lowest prices;
- increased pork exports.

As Minister of Environmental Protection of Ukraine he

- expanded protected areas to 11% of the country;
- expanded recycling and improved landfill operations;
- established protection zones for nature reserves.

He was awarded the Honored Worker of Agriculture of Ukraine.
