= Teodosii Halushchynskyi =

The Very Reverend Teodosii Halushchynskyi, OSBM
- Superior General of the Basilian Order of Saint Josaphat
- Installed: 1949
- Term ended: 1952
- Predecessor: Hlib Kinakh
- Successor: Pavlo Myskiv

Personal details
- Born: 13 April 1880 Buchach, Austria-Hungary
- Died: 31 August 1952 (aged 72) Mundare, Alberta, Canada
- Buried: Mundare, Alberta, Canada
- Denomination: Ukrainian Greek Catholic
- Education: University of Fribourg, University of Vienna, University of Innsbruck

Teodosii Tyt Halushchynskyi, O.S.B.M.(sometimes Theodosiy Halushchinski; Ukrainian: Теодосій Тит Галущинський; 13 April 1880 – 31 August 1952) was a Ukrainian Basilian priest, biblical scholar, and church historian. He rose to be Superior of the Basilian Order.

== Biography ==
He was a brother of Ukrainian educator, politician and Polish Senate member Mykhailo Halushchynskyi. After studying in Vienna, Freiburg and Innsbruck, in 1916 he attained a teaching posiiton at Lviv University. Between 1920 and 1927 he served as the rector of Ukrainian Greek Catholic seminary in Lviv. In 1927-1931 he was the hegumen of a Lviv monastery before moving to Rome. In 1949 he received the status of archimandrite of the Basilian Order and Consultor of the Eastern Church Congregation.

== Notable publications ==
- Biblical History of the Old Testament), parts I-III (Історія Біблійна Старого Завіта, 1914-1934)
- De urbis Babel exordiis... (1917)
- Meaning of the Holy Script in Preaching (Значення св. Письма в проповідництві, 1923)
- Acta Innocentii Papae III (1198 — 1216) (1944)
