= Oleksiy Prylipka =

Ukrainian agriculturist and political scientist (1944–2024)

Hero of Ukraine Oleksiy Prylipka
- Олексій Приліпка
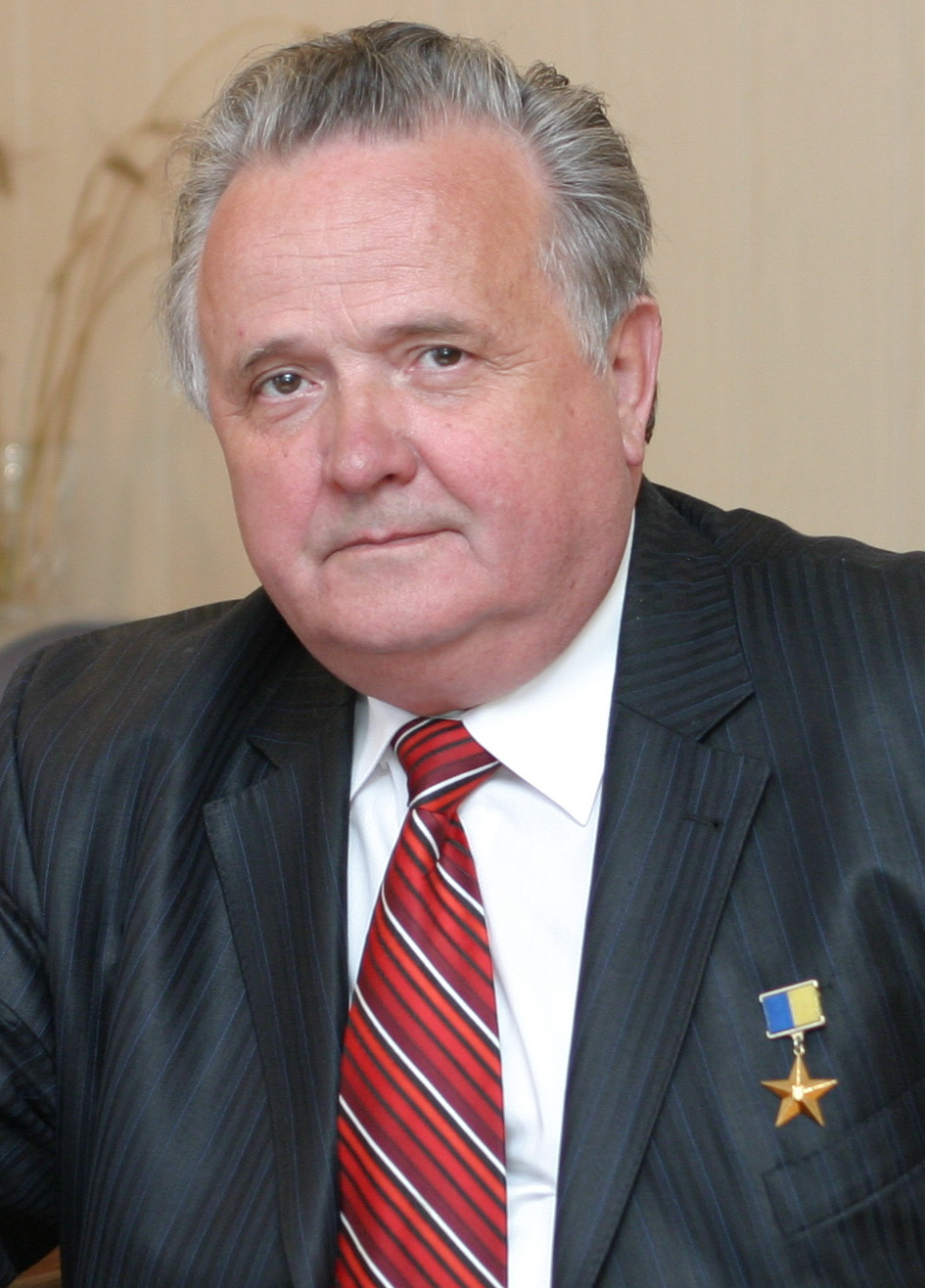
- Prylipka in 2012
- Born: 9 March 1944; Bohoduhivka, Chornobai Raion, Poltava Oblast, Ukrainian SSR, USSR (now Ukraine)
- Died: August 2024 (aged 80)
- Education: Ukrainian Agricultural Academy; Kyiv Higher Party School
- Occupations: Agriculturist; political scientist
- Political party: Lytvyn's People's Bloc
- Awards: Hero of Ukraine

Oleksiy Vasylovych Prylipka (Ukrainian: Олексій Васильович Приліпка; 9 March 1944 – August 2024) was a Ukrainian agronomist and political scientist who earned the title of Hero of Ukraine in 2002. He was able to write about thirty scientific publications, including seven guides for academic institutions and business professionals, by skillfully combining his work with scientific expertise.

== Early life and education ==
Born on 9 March 1944, in the Ukrainian village of Bohoduhivka, Prylipka's early years were enmeshed in the labor and suffering typical of post-war rural life following World War II. He learned the values of hard work, love for the country, and the inherent worth of agricultural labor from his parents, who toiled long hours on the communal farm. In 1971, he received his degree as a scientific agronomic from the Ukrainian Agricultural Academy (now National University of Life and Environmental Sciences of Ukraine), and later as a political scientist from the Kyiv Higher Party School.

== Career ==
In 1962, Prylipka began working as a turner in a Mariupol factory. Upon graduating in 1971, he was employed by the Kyiv Oblast's Pere-yaslav-Khmelnytskyi Department of Agriculture as the chief agronomic and director of the region's plant protection station. He served for the party in the Kyiv Oblast for sixteen years, and for two of those years, served as the deputy chairman of the Ukrainian State Committee for Village Social Development.

When Prylipka took over as general director of the company Scientific Research Production Agro-Pushcha-Vodytsia in 1994, his journey to prominence as a leader officially started. Entrusted with reviving a failing organization on the edge of bankruptcy, he executed an incredible recovery. By virtue of his leadership and organizational abilities, he elevated the company to the forefront of the national agriculture industry. By using modern technology and contemporary, computerized management techniques, he not only brought operations back to life but also led innovation that resulted in the creation of new vegetable crop kinds.

With over thirty scientific publications under Prylipka, including seven university and company specialized guides, he has made a substantial contribution to the debate on agriculture. Furthermore, via his leadership at National University of Life and Environmental Sciences of Ukraine (NUBiP), he has been instrumental in developing the following generation of agricultural experts. The Department of Closed Soil, the Scientific and Training Center of Horticulture, and the Research and Training Center of Closed Soil grew under his direction.

Prylipka was the Head of the Department at NUBiP. He was also an academician of the Academy of Technological Sciences of Ukraine and a Doctor of Economic Sciences. In March 2006, he was a Lytvyn's People's Bloc candidate for people's deputies of Ukraine, no. 126 on the list of electoral district.

== Personal life and death ==
Prylipka's family was one of the communal farmers. While Hanna Andriivna, his mother, worked on the farm on a daily basis, his father was an automobile driver.

Prylipka died in August 2024, at the age of 80.

== Awards and recognitions ==
Prylipka received the title of Hero of Ukraine and the Order of the State by Presidential Decree of 13 November 2002, in recognition of his exceptional personal contributions to the advancement of agricultural and contemporary management practices in Ukraine. He has received other awards and recognitions such as:

- Hero of Ukraine Order of the State (13 November 2002)
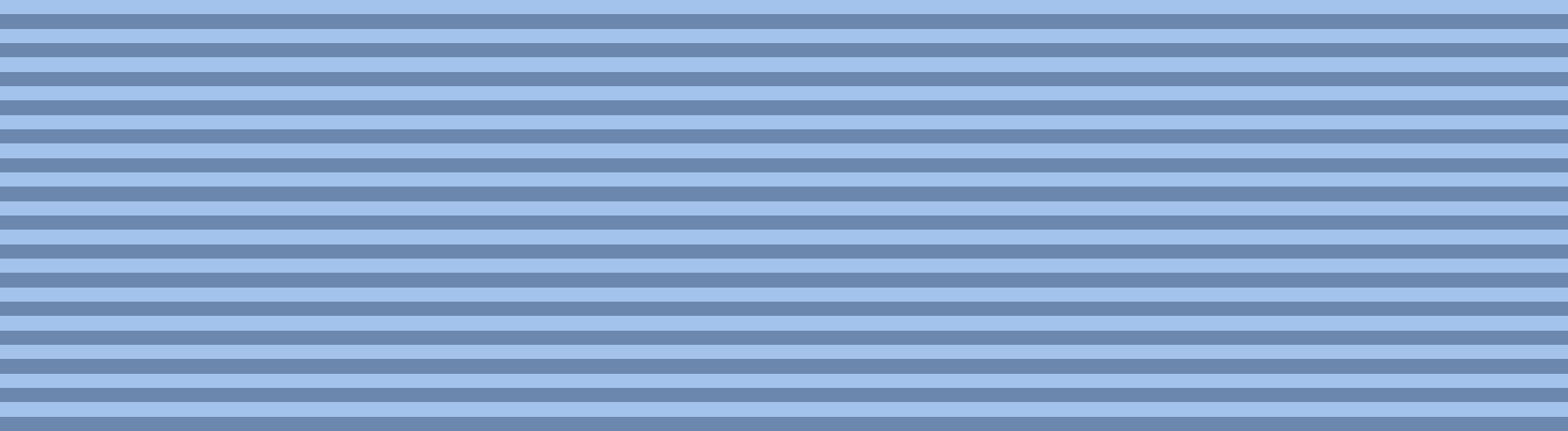
- Order of Prince Yaroslav the Wise Fifth Class (6 March 2009)
- Order of Merit Third Class (26 February 2001)
- Medal "Veteran of Labour" (1983)
- Medal "For Labour Valour" (1976)
- Honorary Diploma of the Cabinet of Ministers of Ukraine (26 June 1999; 14 October 2004)
- State Prize of Ukraine in Science and Technology (19 December 2005)
- Honored Worker of Agriculture of Ukraine (31 October 1997)
