= Sokolivka, Kosiv Raion, Ivano-Frankivsk Oblast =

Rural locality in Ivano-Frankivsk Oblast, Ukraine

Sokolivka Соколівка
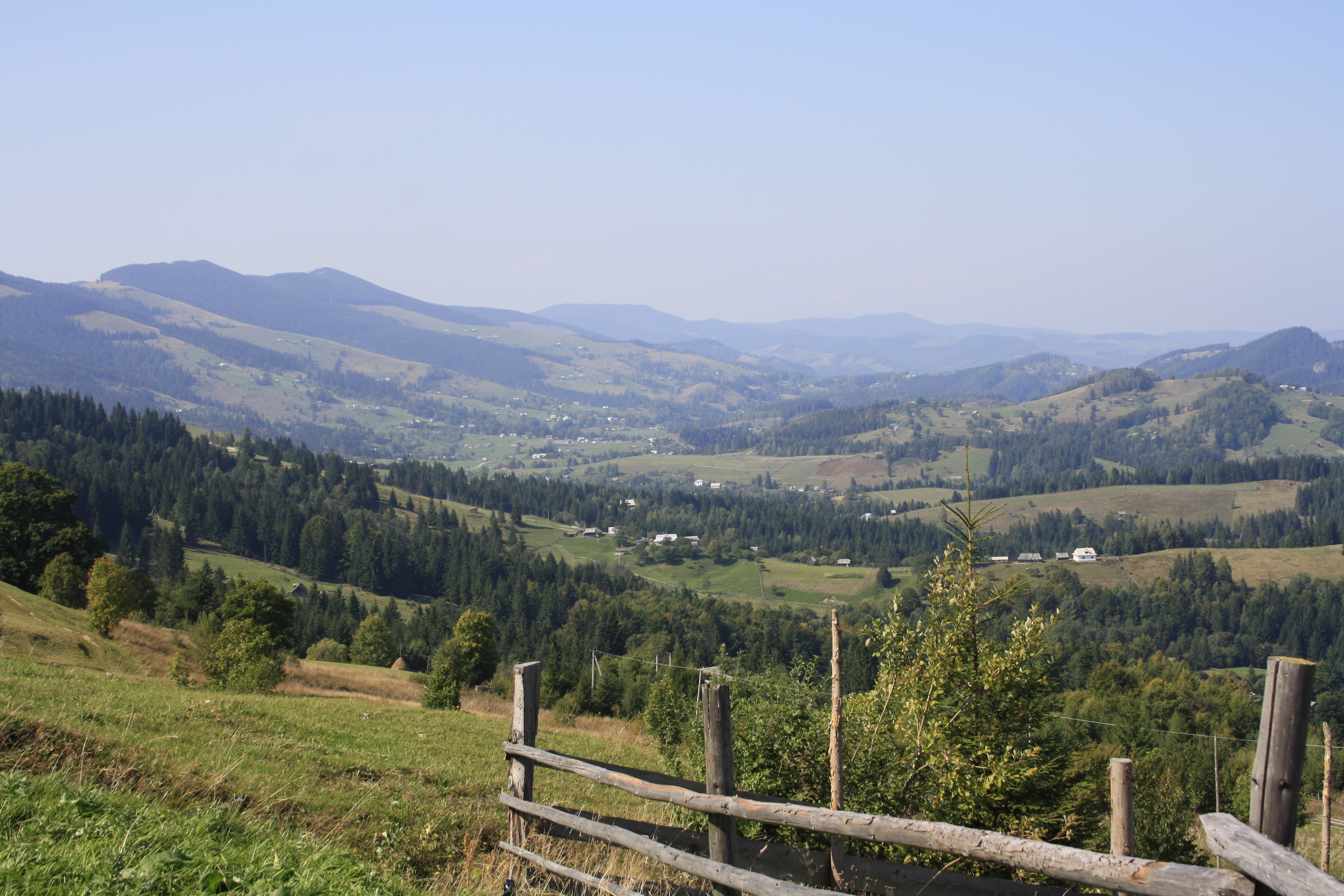
- Panorama of the village and the surrounding mountains

- Location in Ivano-Frankivsk Oblast
- Coordinates: 48°17′22″N 24°59′32″E
- Country: Ukraine
- Oblast: Ivano-Frankivsk Oblast
- Raion: Kosiv Raion
- Hromada: Kosiv Hromada
- Time zone: UTC+2 (EET)
  - Summer (DST): UTC+3 (EEST)
- Postal code: 78650

Sokolivka (Ukrainian: Соколівка; Polish: Sokołówka) is a village in Kosiv urban hromada, Kosiv Raion, Ivano-Frankivsk Oblast, Ukraine.

== Religion ==
- Church of the Holy Spirit (1866, wooden, OCU)

== Notable residents ==
- Oleksa Volianskyi (1862–1947), Ukrainian priest, ethnographer, cultural and educational activist

== Sources ==
- "Sokołówka pow. kossowski". Geographical Dictionary of the Kingdom of Poland (in Polish). 11. Warszawa: Kasa im. Józefa Mianowskiego. 1890. p. 35.
