= Dmytro Melnychuk =

Ukrainian academic

Dmytro Oleksiyovych Melnychuk
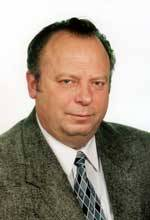
- Born: November 5, 1943; Mariyka, Ukraine
- Education: National University of Life and Environmental Sciences of Ukraine
- Occupation: Biochemist
- Website: melnichukdmitro.openua.net/bio.php

Dmytro Melnychuk (Ukrainian: Дмитро Мельничук; born November 5, 1943) – Hero of Ukraine, academician of National Academy of Sciences and National Academy of Agrarian Sciences, professor (biochemistry), doctor of biological sciences, honored worker of science of Ukraine, state prize laureate in science and technology of Ukraine, Full Cavalier of Ukraine titles "For Merits", rector of the National University of Life and Environmental Sciences of Ukraine (NULES of Ukraine, 1984–1.06.2014), professor of the department of biochemistry and the quality and safety of agricultural products NULES of Ukraine, member of the bureau of biochemistry, physiology and medical sciences of Ukraine, member section "Biology" of the state committee of Ukraine on awarding state prizes of Ukraine in science and technology, member of the scientific council of the world confederation of associations of higher agricultural education and life sciences (since 2013), member of the agrarian party of Ukraine (since 1996), chairman of the NGO "Council of Ukraine heroes in agriculture " (since 2014), honored veteran of Kyiv.

In different periods of his activity was: a member of the higher attestation commission of USSR, member of the State Duma of Ukraine, member of the board of the Ministry of Education and Science of Ukraine, president of the World Consortium agricultural universities (representing over 100 countries), supervisor of creating and development of agrarian university in Phnom Penh, (Cambodia, 1985–1991), managed the creation of Vinnytsia National Agrarian University (former branch of NULES of Ukraine), twice elected vice-president of National academy of agrarian sciences of Ukraine (part-time), deputy of the Kyiv city and regional councils, advisor to the General Director of the FAO Council, advisor to the chairman of the Verkhovna Rada of Ukraine, member of the International Committee of the International Award for significant contribution into increasing world food resources («World food prize», USA), member of the USSR and president of Ukrainian Biochemical association, as well as many other national and international public and government organizations, associations and commissions, Presidium member and chairman of section "Biology" of the State Committee of Ukraine on awarding state prizes of Ukraine in Science and Technology, editor in chief and member of the editorial boards of several international and Ukrainian scientific journals, etc.

Scientific advisor for 11 Doctors of Science and 22 candidates of science.

== Biography ==
Born November 5, 1943 in the village Mariyka, Cherkasy region.

Graduated in 1959 from high school in Zhashkiv number 2.

In 1964 graduated from the Faculty of Veterinary Ukrainian Agricultural Academy (now National University of Life and Environmental Sciences of Ukraine).

Since 1965 – a veterinarian at seed farm in Vinnytsia region. During 1965-1968 – PhD student under the supervision of Academic of National academy of sciences of Ukraine M.F. Gulyi at the Department of Biochemistry in the Ukrainian Agricultural Academy, 1968-1969 – assistant at the biochemistry department in Ukrainian Agricultural Academy, 1969-1972 – Junior researcher of the department of biosynthesis of proteins and biological properties at the Institute of Biochemistry of national academy of sciences of Ukraine, 1972-1982 – Senior associate of its Institute, 1982-1984 – Head of Laboratory (Department) of metabolism regulation at the Institute of Biochemistry in National academy of sciences of Ukraine, 1979-1984 – Head of the Department of Biochemistry of Ukrainian academy of agrarian sciences.

In 1984–1992 he was Rector of the Ukrainian Agricultural Academy (UAA) and part-time – Head of Department of Metabolism Regulation Institute of Biochemistry at national academy of sciences (volunteer), 1992-1994 – Rector of the Ukrainian State Agrarian University (USAU) – Former UAA, 1994-2008 – Rector of National Agricultural University (NAU) - former USAU, 20.10.2008-30.05.2014 – Rector of National University of Life and Environmental Sciences of Ukraine (NULES of Ukraine) - former NAU. 1995-1996 and 2001-2003 – Deputy President of the National Academy of Agrarian Sciences of Ukraine (NAAS) and a member of the Presidium (part-time), from 1984 to the present – Professor of Biochemistry department of NULES of Ukraine. Supervisor of creating and development of agrarian university in Phnom Penh, (Cambodia, 1985–1991), managed the creation of Vinnytsia National Agrarian University (1984–1995).

== Scientific and research activity ==
In 1968 in the Ukrainian academy of agrarian sciences defended thesis "Influence activation carboxylation reactions on some indicators of metabolism and animal performance". In 1974 in the Institute of Biochemistry of National academy of sciences of Ukraine (Kyiv) defended doctoral dissertation "Carbon dioxide as a factor in the regulation of metabolism in animals". In 1984 awarded the academic title of professor of biological chemistry.

The main direction of scientific activity of D.O. Melnychuk and his scientific school is to study the molecular mechanisms of regulation of metabolism in animals and humans and the search and development of methods of correction of their violations. Together with Acad. M.F. Gulyiv grounded biological role of carboxylation and decarboxylation reactions in the metabolism of macromolecules and of energy in heterotrophic organisms, determined a number of physical and chemical patterns of carbamate formation of proteins and the estimates of their role in the regulation of enzyme activity, discovered the molecular mechanisms of systems metabolic homeostasis in cells in violation of the acid-base balance of the body, identified specific proteins membrane of enterocytes of the small intestine of newborn animals involved in the formation of maternal immunity, analyzed role of phospholipids in the prevention and treatment of gastroenteritis, made a significant contribution to disclosure mechanisms of influence changes in bicarbonate concentration and CO_{2} in the blood on the intensity of the energy, mineral and nitrogen metabolism, discovered the molecular mechanisms of action hypercapnia and how to transfer the animals to the state of natural and artificial hibernation, also proved prospects of developed technique for veterinary and medical anesthetics, identified the molecular mechanisms of metabolic regulation disorders in diseases of animals and people such as: osteoporosis and osteomalacia, podagra, diabetes, caries, pre- and postnatal and postoperative complications (metabolic acidosis and ketosis), alcohol and ammonium toxicosis, heavy metal toxicosis, feed (food) acidosis in animals and humans, etc. For these research materials published about 700 scientific works, included over 10 monographs and textbooks.

Based on these researches, a number of effective drugs (karboksylin, MP-15, karbostymulin, medihronal, foosfomol, prophylactic beverages and others), new methods of research as well as diagnosis and prevention and treatment of the above diseases, etc. were developed and implemented in practice in humane and veterinary medicine and food and feed areas. The relevance and importance of these scientific developments are confirmed by more than 60 patents, and the assigning of titles: Hero of Ukraine (2003), complete chevalier Ukraine "For Merits" (1997, 1998 and 2009), winner of the State Prize of Ukraine in Science and Technology (1984), Honored Scientist of Ukraine (1990), Lieutenant General State Veterinary Service (1998) – as a member of a government antiepizootic commission, winner of Prize Vernadsky (2003), and election as a full member of the National Academy of Sciences of Ukraine (1997) and the Ukrainian Academy of Agricultural Sciences (1990)., Honorary Professor (Dr.) of a number of universities in the US, Germany, Japan, Poland, Russia, Kazakhstan, Georgia, Armenia, Ukraine, etc. Scientific advisor for 11 Doctors of Science and 22 candidates of science.

== Scientific-pedagogical and social activities ==
During the period of D. Melnychuk as rector of NULES of Ukraine (1984-01.06.2014) University team in 1990 won first place (by results of rating) of 108 agricultural universities of the USSR, since 1991 in the university organized substantial reforms regarding the transformation of the former education system to a market economy and integration of education, research and innovation activities, for which university was granted a status – research (2008). In 2013 the university became the leader of the European competition "Quality 2013" and successfully launched the process of accreditation by the US educational standards. In university under rector D.O. Melnychuk developed 37 new specialties, significantly strengthened research and innovation activities of the University (established relevant research and innovative scientific institutes, laboratories, centers, science parks etc.). During the period 2003-2013 University scientific developments won the 6 State Prizes in Science and Technology of Ukraine, NULES of Ukraine entered to the top ten universities in Ukraine and in the first 10-15 percent of 22 thousand universities in the world. At NULES of Ukraine operates more than 20 specialized councils on thesis defense. A significant amount of reforms in education, research and innovation, which was held in 1990-2013 became the basis for the official recognition of the education system of NULES of Ukraine by a number of universities in the US, Germany, Belgium, the Netherlands, etc. The high international reputation of Acad. D.O. Melnychuk in this field is confirmed by his election is 1998 as President-elect and in 2003 (in. San Francisco) - President of the International Consortium of agricultural universities and research institutions in agriculture (GCHERA), which included representatives of more than 100 countries. Successful work of D.O. Melnychuk on this public position was the basis for his appointment as a member of the Higher Council of the UN FAO General Director, election a member of the International Committee of the International Award for significant contribution into increasing world food resources («World food prize», USA), member of the Scientific Council of the World Confederation of Agricultural Associations of educational and research institutions (2013), awarded by France The Order "For Merit" (2008), Order of the Russian Academy of Sciences (2008) gold award and the UN FAO (2008).

D.O. Melnychuk is: lifelong honorary senator of the Senate of Louisiana (USA), honorary doctor of: Berlin Humboldt University (Germany), Ghent University (Belgium), Lublin University of Natural Sciences (Poland); honorary professor of: University of Iowa and Arkansas (USA), Russian State Agrarian University - Moscow Agricultural Academy named. Timiryazev, Astrakhan Technical University (Russian Federation), Warsaw University of Life Sciences (Poland) Kazakh, Georgian, Armenian agricultural universities and a number of universities in Ukraine.

== Awards ==
- Hero of Ukraine (with the Order of State, 05.11.2003)
- Full Cavalier of Orders Ukraine - "For Merits" III (12.1996), II (09.1998), and I level (2009)
- USSR Medal "For Labour Merit" (1973)
- State Prize of Ukraine in Science and Technology (1984)
- Honored Worker of Science of Ukraine (1990)
- Winner of the International Prize "Friendship" (1995)
- "Badge of Honor" of the Ministry of Agrarian Policy of Ukraine (2001.)
- Winner of the Prize. V.I. Vernadsky (2003.)
- Gold award from the UN FAO «World food day» (2008.)
- Order of the Russian Academy of Sciences (2008)
- Order of France - "For Merit" (2009).
- "Badge of Honor" National academy of agrarian sciences of Ukraine (2014)
- Diplomas of the Ministry of Agriculture of the USSR, the Verkhovna Rada and the Cabinet of Ministers of Ukraine, medals of the USSR, NAS of Ukraine, Ministry of Agrarian Policy, Ministry of Education, Ministry of Interior, NAAS, NAPS, Kyiv Mayor and other institutions and organizations
