= Kryvorivnia =

Rural locality in Ivano-Frankivsk Oblast, Ukraine

Kryvorivnia Криворівня
- Village
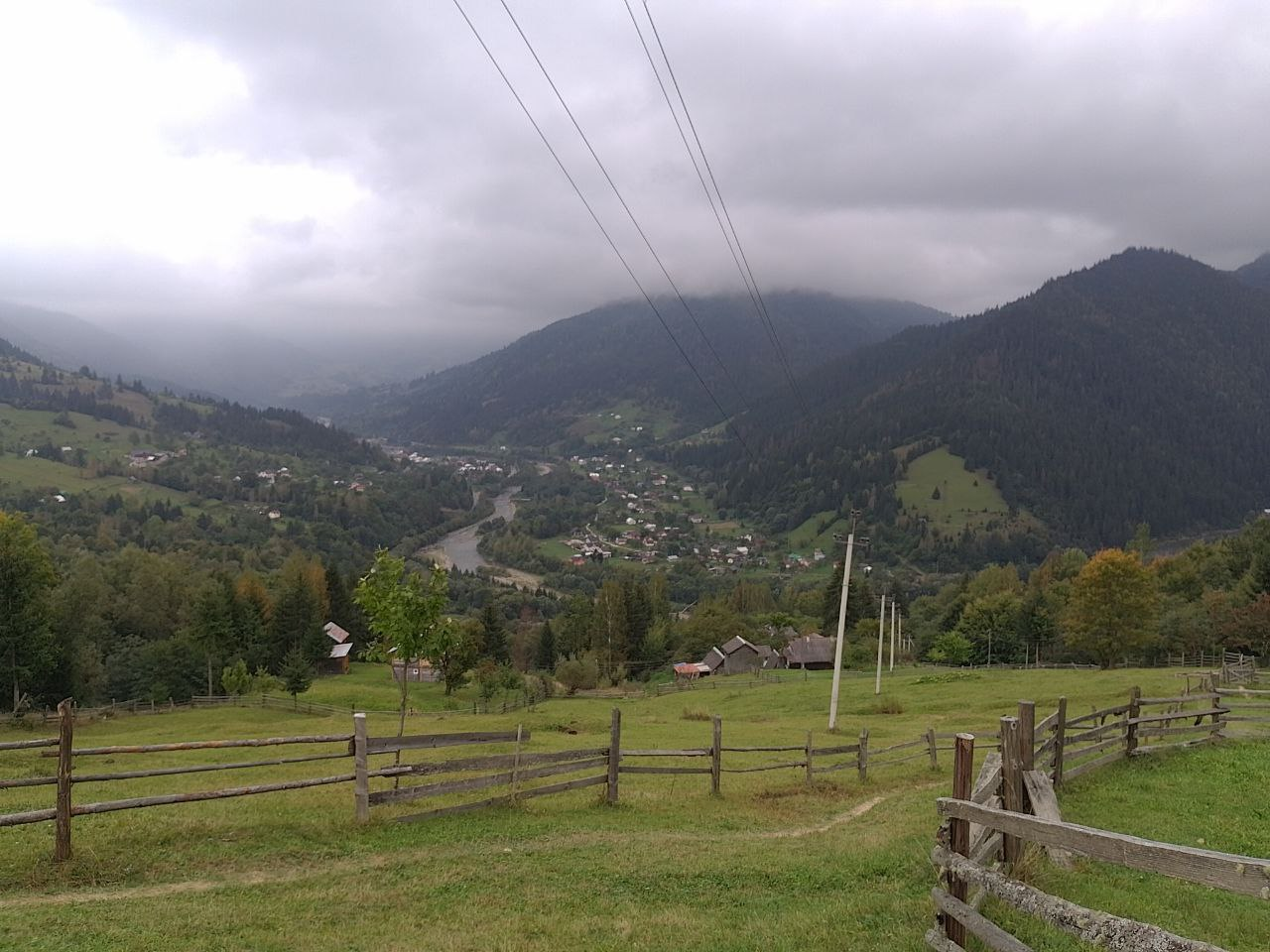
- Interactive map of Kryvorivnia
- Location within Ukraine Location within Ivano-Frankivsk Oblast
- Coordinates: 48°10′31″N 24°53′48″E
- Country: Ukraine
- Oblast: Ivano-Frankivsk Oblast
- Time zone: UTC+02:00 (EET)
  - Summer (DST): UTC+03:00 (EEST)
- Area code: ?

Kryvorivnia (Ukrainian: Криворівня) is a village in the Verkhovyna Raion of the Ivano-Frankivsk Oblast of Ukraine. It is considered both the traditional summer and the winter capital of the Hutsul people. Kryvorivnia belongs to Verkhovyna settlement hromada, one of the hromadas of Ukraine.

== Religion ==
- Church of the Nativity of the Theotokos (1719, PCU, wooden)

== Shadows of Forgotten Ancestors ==
The film Shadows of Forgotten Ancestors by Sergei Parajanov was filmed in the village. The house where the filming took place is now a museum.

== Notable residents ==
- Ivan Rybaruk (born 1966), Ukrainian priest, writer, editor, presenter
- Oleksa Volianskyi (1862–1947), Ukrainian priest, ethnographer, cultural and educational activist
