= Verkhovyna settlement hromada =

Settlement hromada in Ivano-Frankivsk Oblast, Ukraine

Verkhovyna settlement hromada Верховинська селищна громада
- Hromada
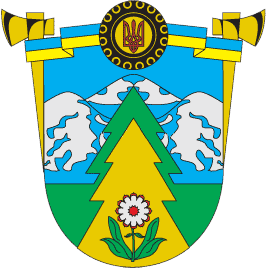
- Seal
- Interactive map of Verkhovyna settlement hromada
- Country: Ukraine
- Oblast: Ivano-Frankivsk
- Raion: Verkhovyna

Area
  - Total: 407.2 km^{2} (157.2 sq mi)

Population (2023)
  - Total: 19,845
  - Density: 48.74/km^{2} (126.2/sq mi)
- Settlements: 20
- Villages: 19
- Towns: 1
- Website: verrada.gov.ua

Verkhovyna settlement territorial hromada (Ukrainian: Верховинська селищна територіальна громада, romanized: Verkhovynska selyshchna terytorialna hromada) is a hromada of Ukraine, situated in the western Ivano-Frankivsk Oblast. Its administrative centre is the urban-type settlement of Verkhovyna.

The hromada has an area of 407.2 km^{2} (157.2 mi^{2}). Its population is 19,845 (as of 2023).

== Settlements ==
In addition to one urban-type settlement (Verkhovyna), the hromada includes 19 villages:

- Berezhnytsia
- Bukovets
- Velykyi Khodak
- Verkhnii Yaseniv
- Vyhoda
- Vipche
- Volova
- Holovy
- Zamahora
- Iltsi
- Krasnyk
- Krasnoyillia
- Kryvopillia
- Kryvorivnia
- Perekhresne
- Rivnia
- Stayishche
- Cheretiv
- Chorna Richka
