= National University of Life and Environmental Sciences of Ukraine =

Public agricultural university in Kyiv, Ukraine

Coordinates: 50°23′02″N 30°30′20″E

- Національний університет біоресурсів і природокористування України
- Type: National university
- Established: 1898
- Affiliations: Ministry of Education and Science of Ukraine
- Rector: Stanislav Nikolaenko
- Location: Kyiv, Ukraine
- Website: nubip.edu.ua/en

University rankings

Regional – Overall
- QS Emerging Europe and Central Asia: 183 (2022)

The National University of Life and Environmental Sciences of Ukraine (Ukrainian: Національний університет біоресурсів і природокористування України, romanized: Natsionalnyi universytet bioresursiv i pryrodokorystuvannia Ukrainy) is a public agricultural university in Kyiv, Ukraine.

Established in 1898, prior to 1992 the institution was named the Ukrainian Agricultural Academy (Ukrainian: Українська Сільськогосподарська Академія, romanized: Ukrainska Silskohospodarska Akademiia). From 1992 to 2008, it went by the name of National Agricultural University (Ukrainian: Національний Аграрний Університет, romanized: Natsionalnyi Ahrarnyi Universytet).

== Notable alumni ==
- Trofim Lysenko, Soviet agronomist and biologist, proponent of Lysenkoism.
- Anatoly Shvidenko, Doctor of Sciences, Senior research scholar at the International Institute for Applied Systems Analysis (Austria). Professor Emeritus of the University.
- Stanislav Nikolaenko, Head of the National University of Life and Environmental Sciences of Ukraine since 2014. Doctor of Pedagogical Sciences, Professor, Deputy of the Verkhovna Rada of Ukraine of 4 convocations, Minister of Education and Science of Ukraine in 2005–2007.
- Viktor Boiko, Honored Worker of Agriculture of Ukraine, Candidate of Sciences in Public Administration. Deputy of the Verkhovna Rada of Ukraine of the IV convocation, Deputy Minister of Agrarian Policy of Ukraine (2009), Minister of Environmental Protection of Ukraine (2010).
- Dmytro Melnychuk, Head of the National University of Life and Environmental Sciences of Ukraine (1984–2014), Doctor of Biological Sciences, Professor, Academician of the National Academy of Sciences of Ukraine and the National Academy of Agrarian Sciences of Ukraine. Hero of Ukraine.
- Oleksandr Moroz, deputy of the Verkhovna Rada of Ukraine of 5 convocations, Chairman of the Verkhovna Rada of Ukraine (1994–1998, and 2006–2007). Co-founder of the Socialist Party of Ukraine.
- Ivan Plyushch, twice Chairman of the Verkhovna Rada of Ukraine (1991–1994, 2000–2002). Member of the Verkhovna Rada of Ukraine of I, II, III, IV, V convocations, Secretary of the National Security and Defence Council of Ukraine (2007). Hero of Ukraine (2001).
- Oleksiy Prylipka, Ukrainian agronomist and political scientist
- Halyna Hutchins, Ukrainian cinematographer, fatally shot with a prop gun by actor Alec Baldwin while filming Rust
- Dmitri Constantinov, Moldovan politician and businessman

== Gallery ==
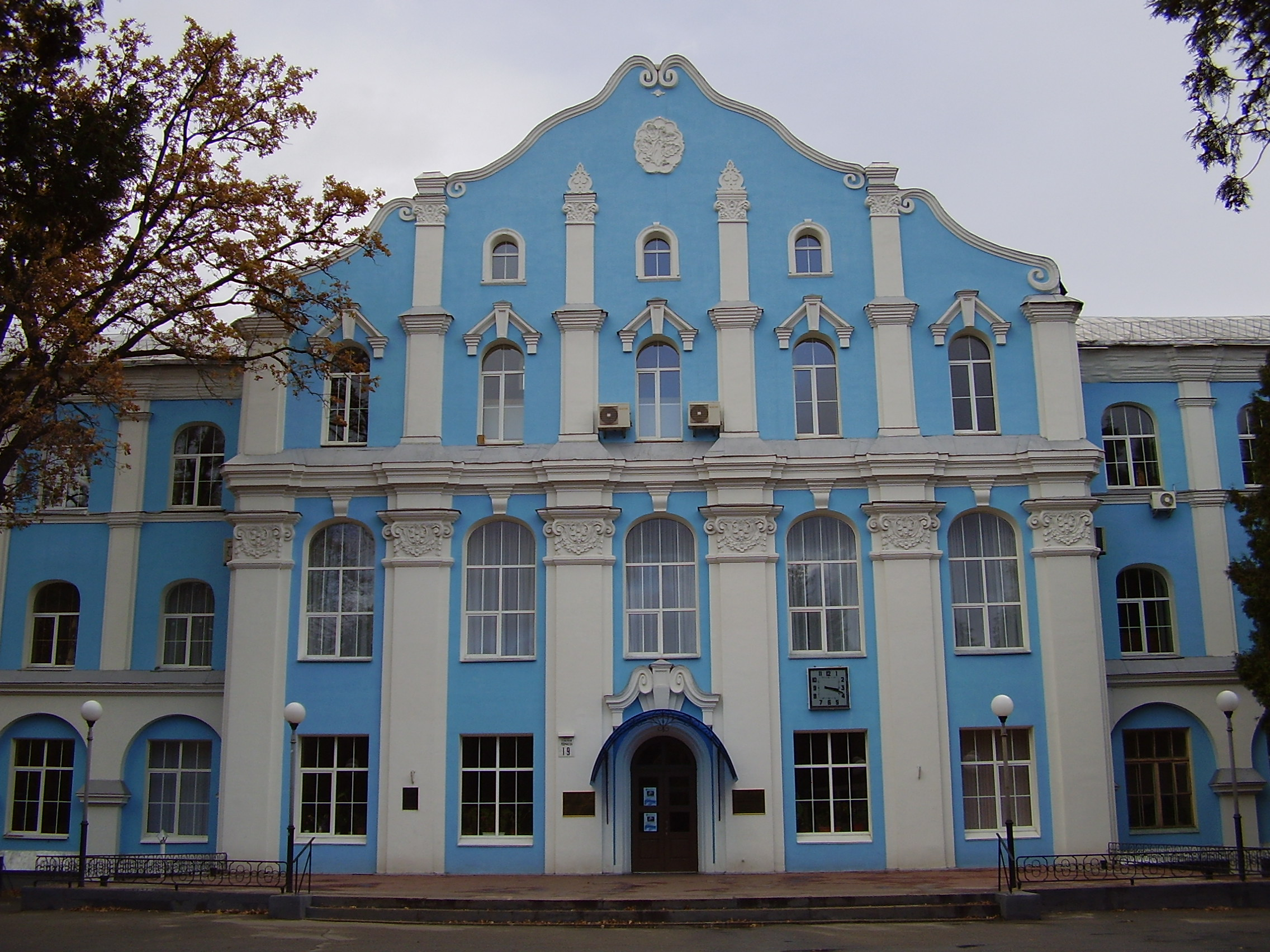
Historical building of the academy

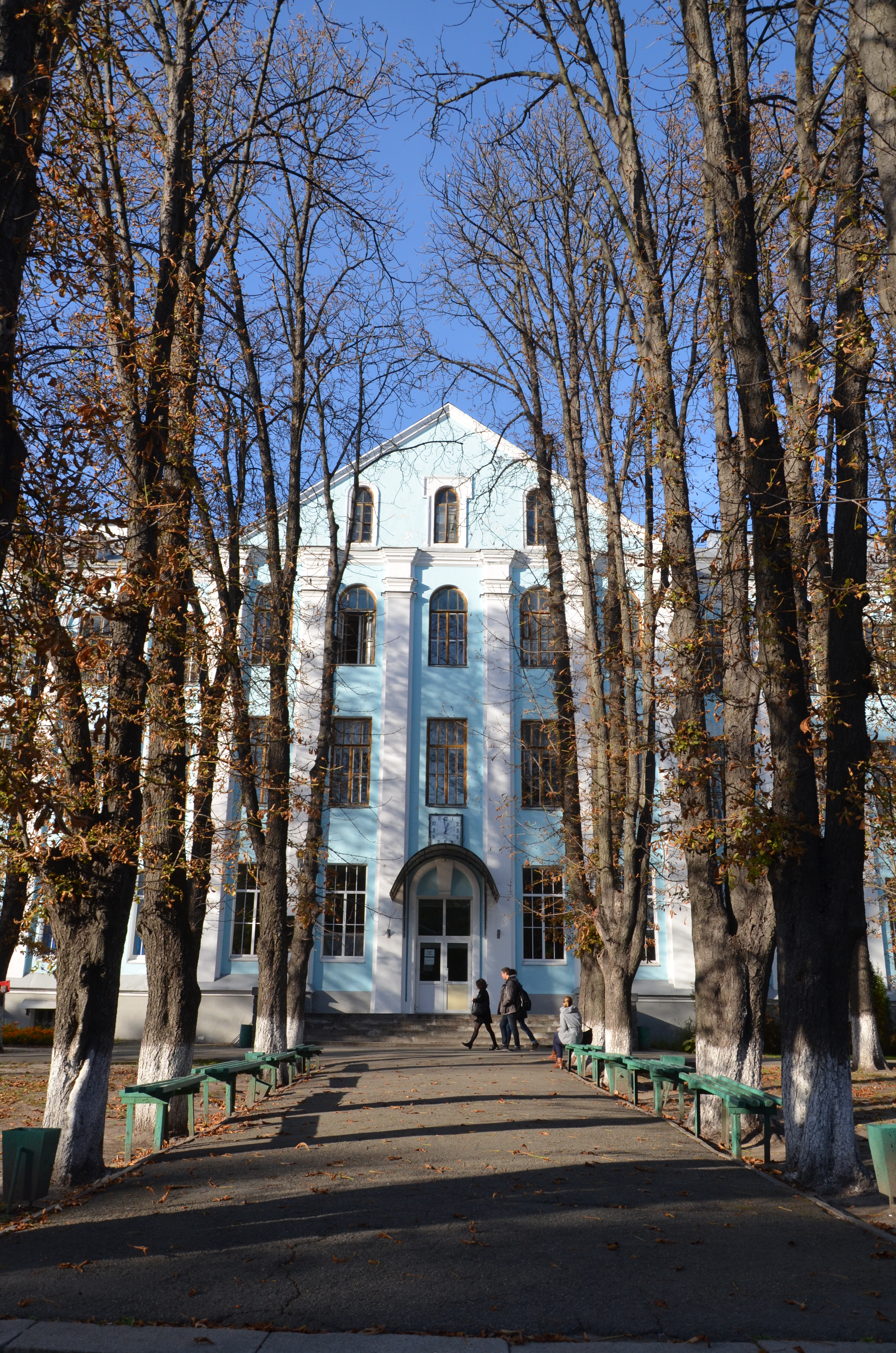
Agrochemistry Institute (building no.2)

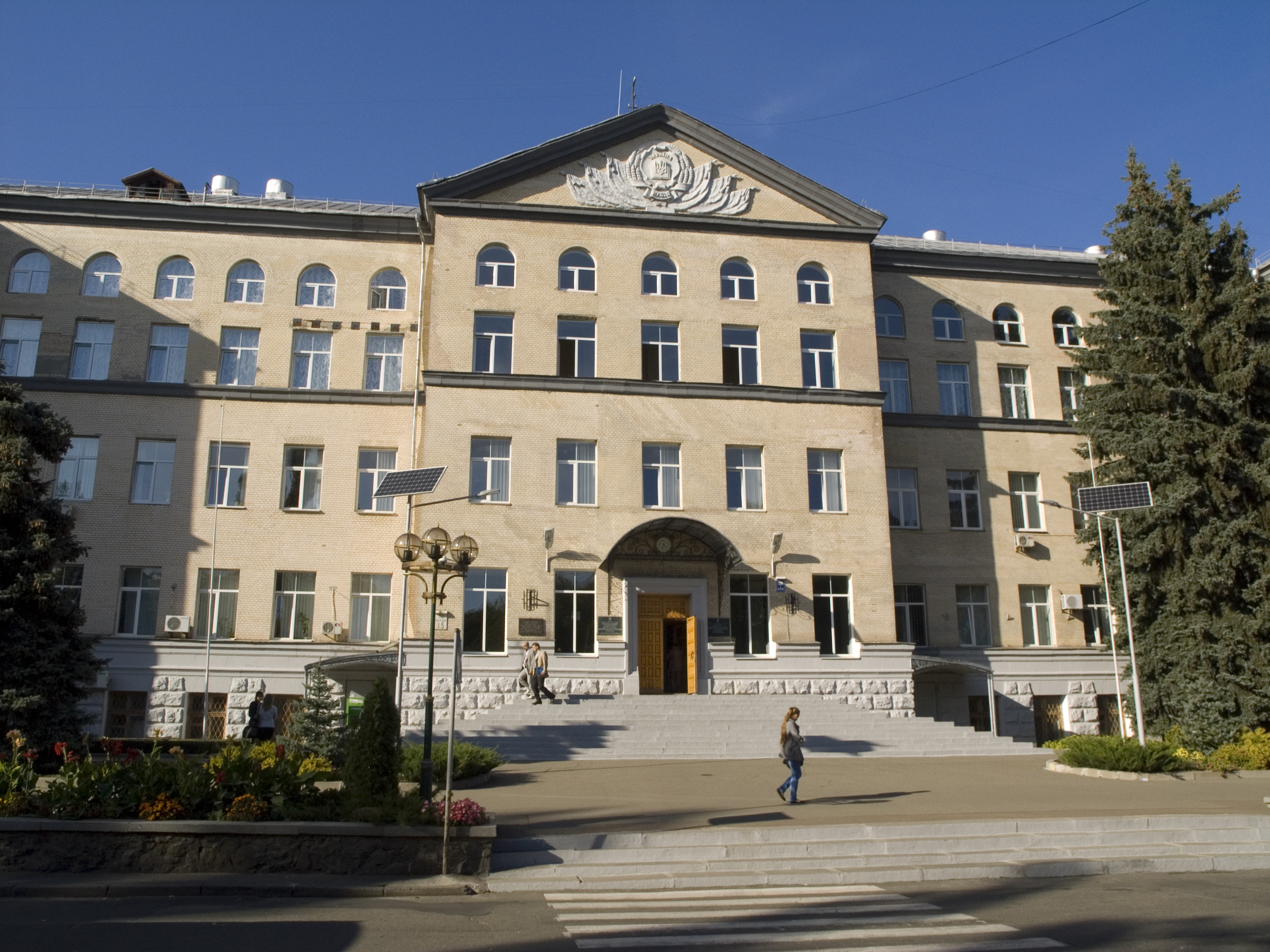
Zootechnical Institute (building no.3)

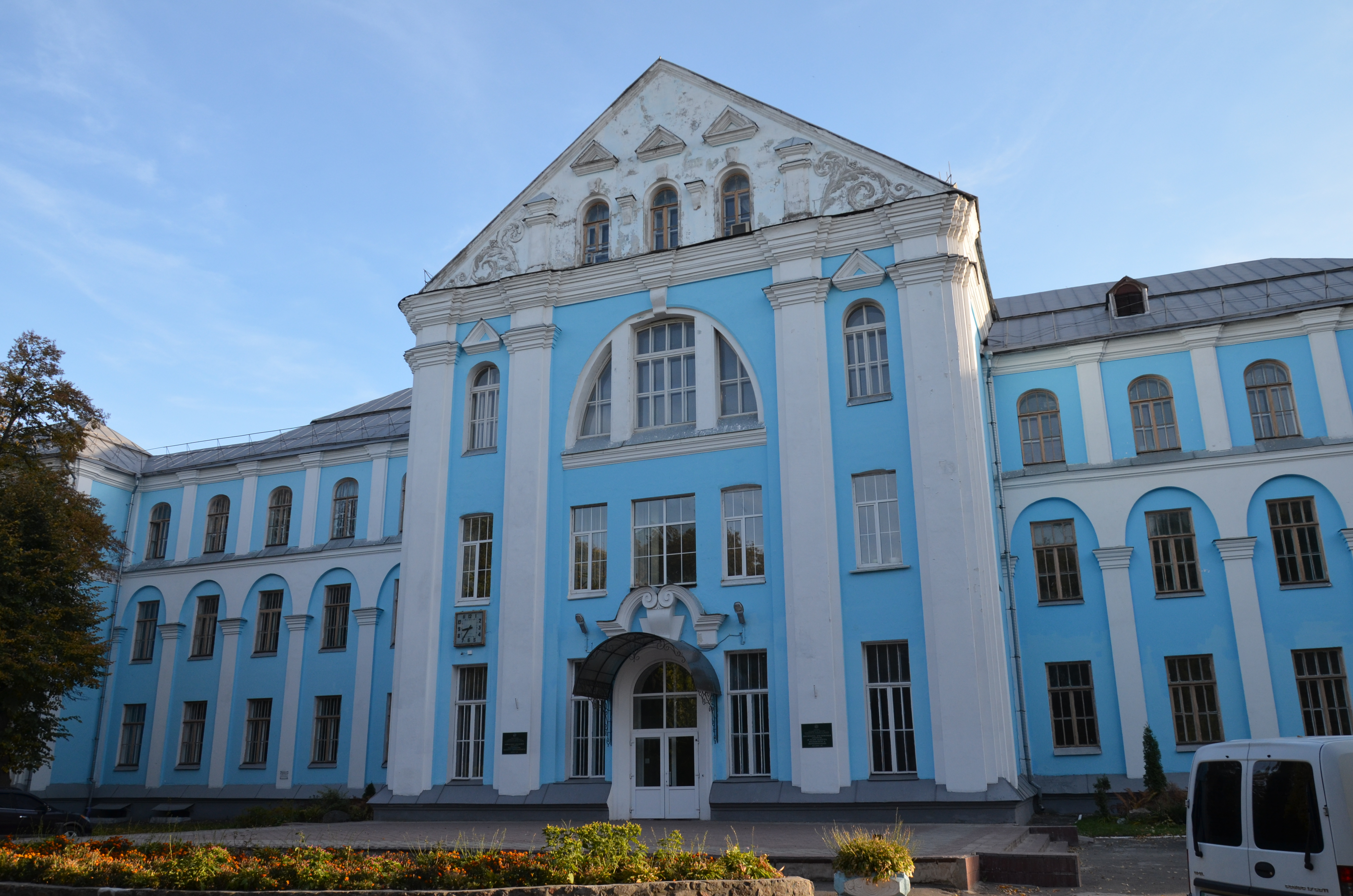
Institute of Mechanization and Electrification (building no.4)

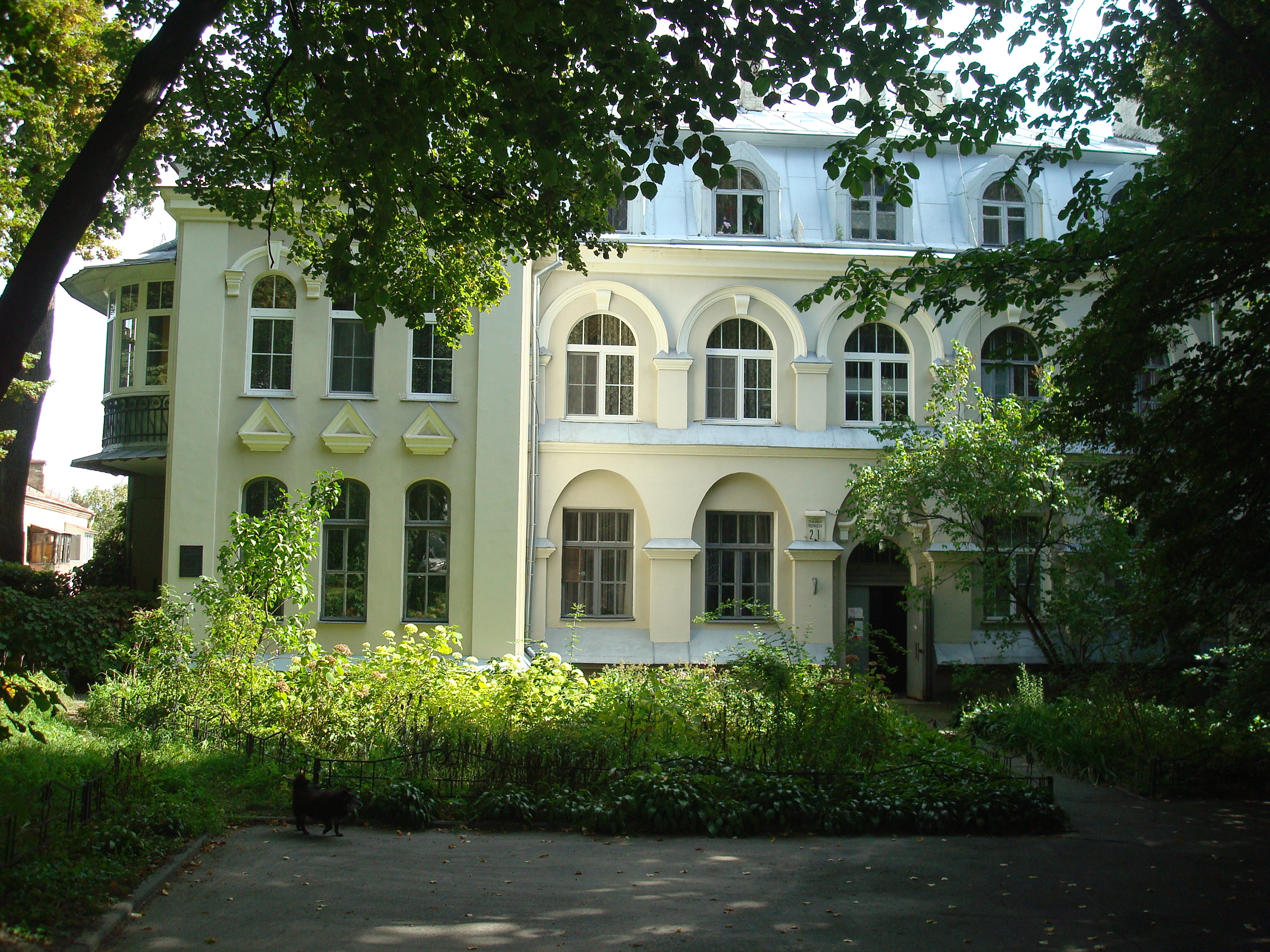
Professors' building

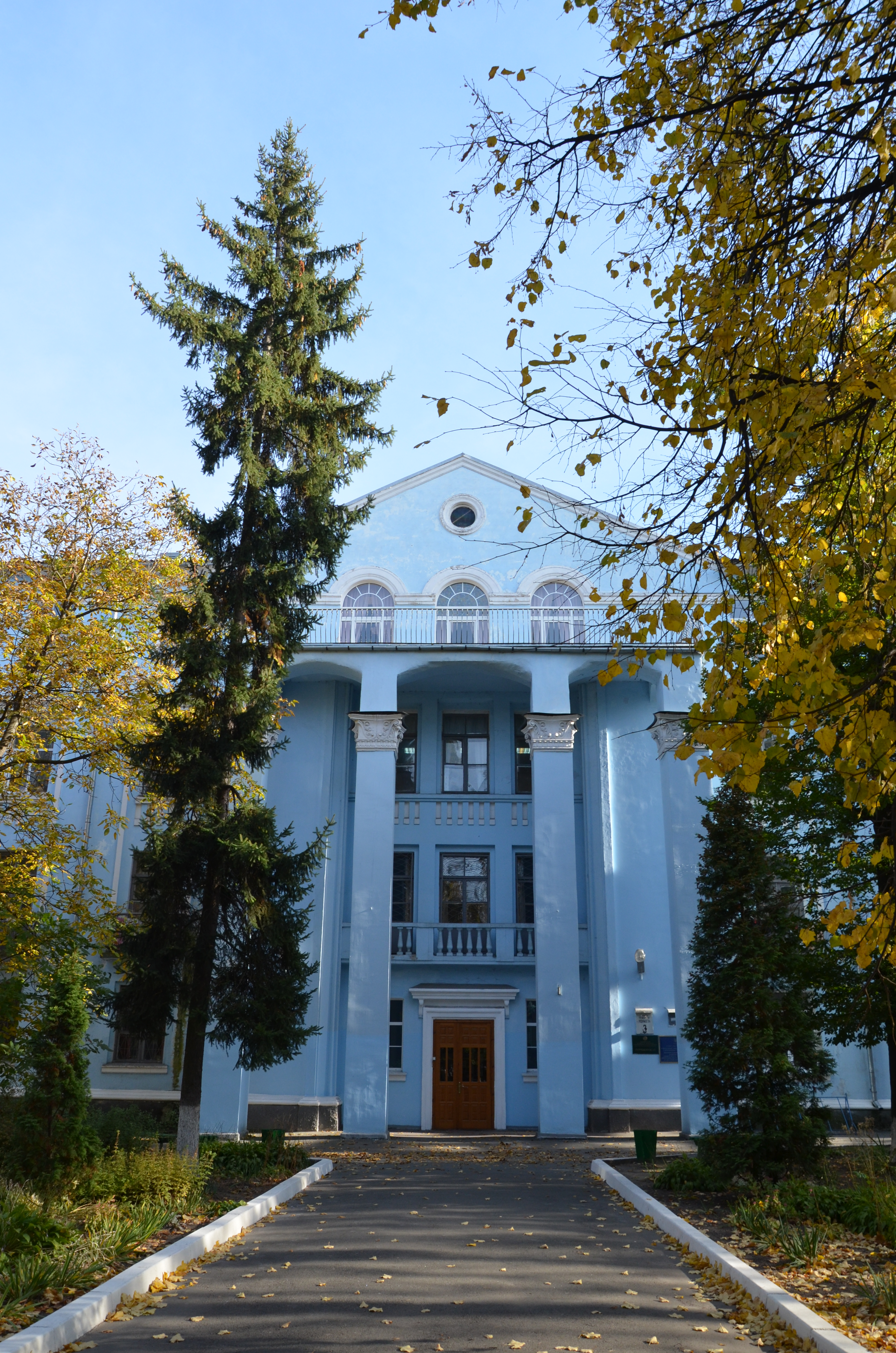
Student dormitory

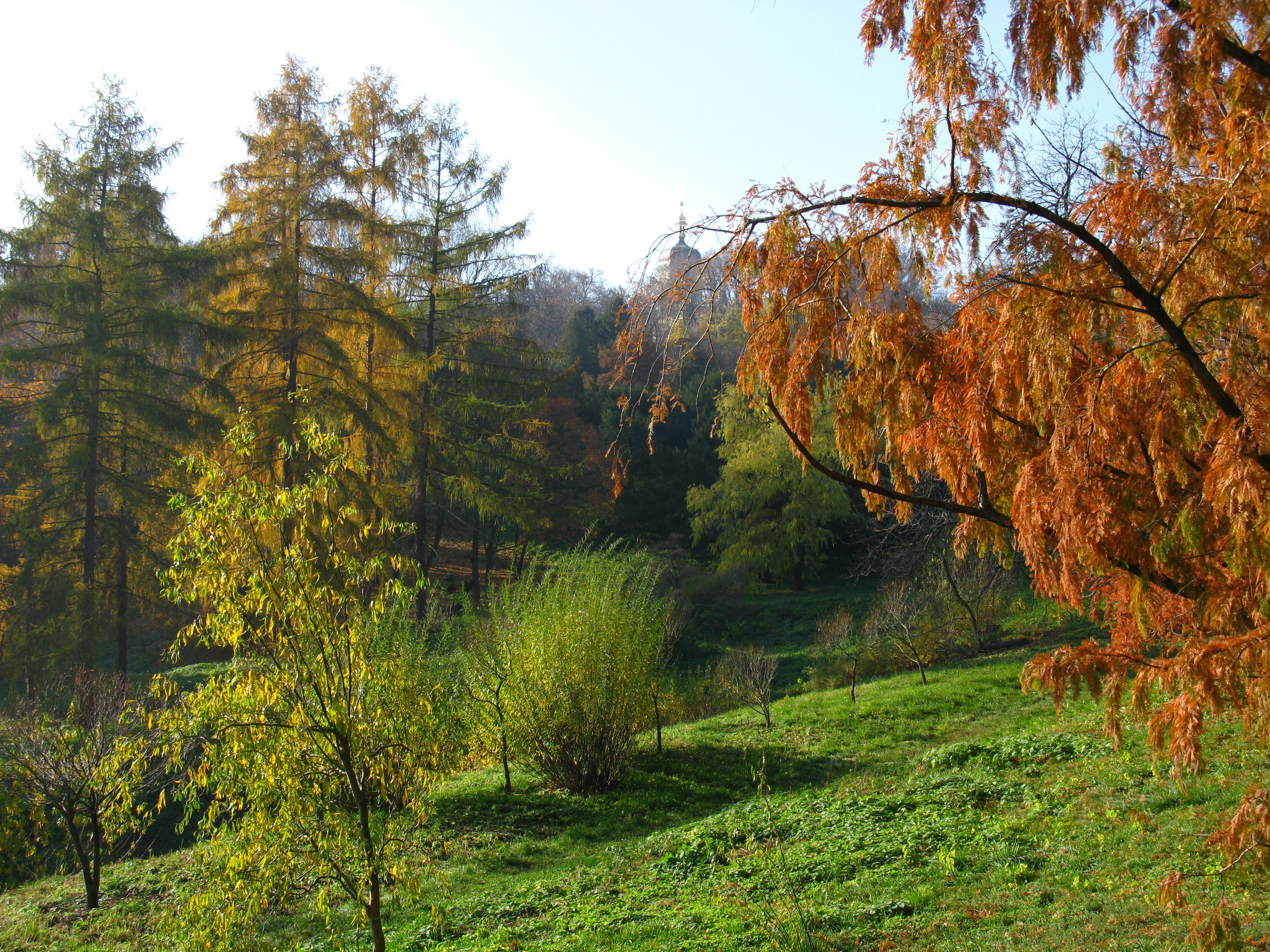
University botanical garden

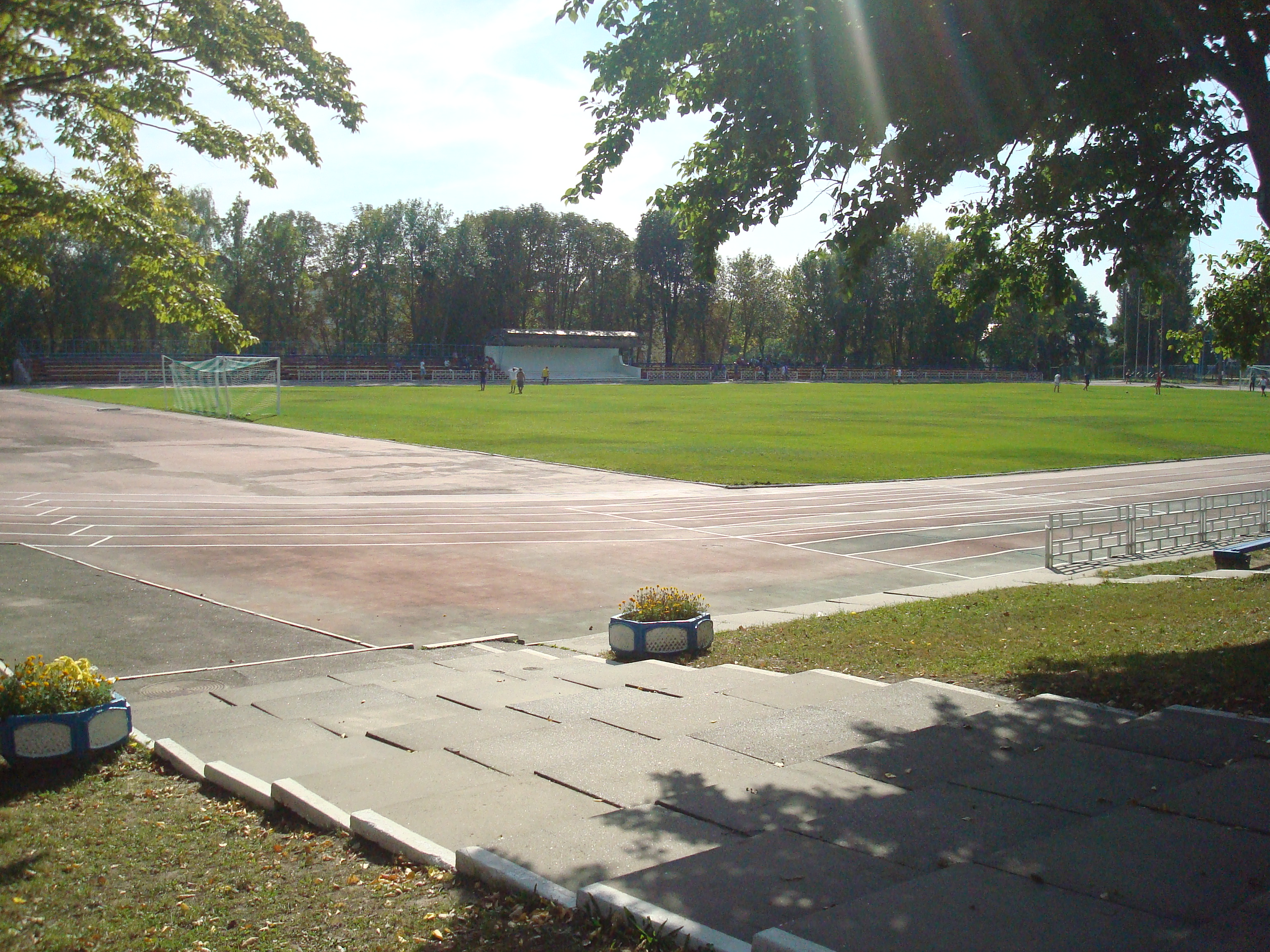
University stadium

== See also ==
List of universities in Ukraine
