= List of villages in Ivano-Frankivsk Oblast =

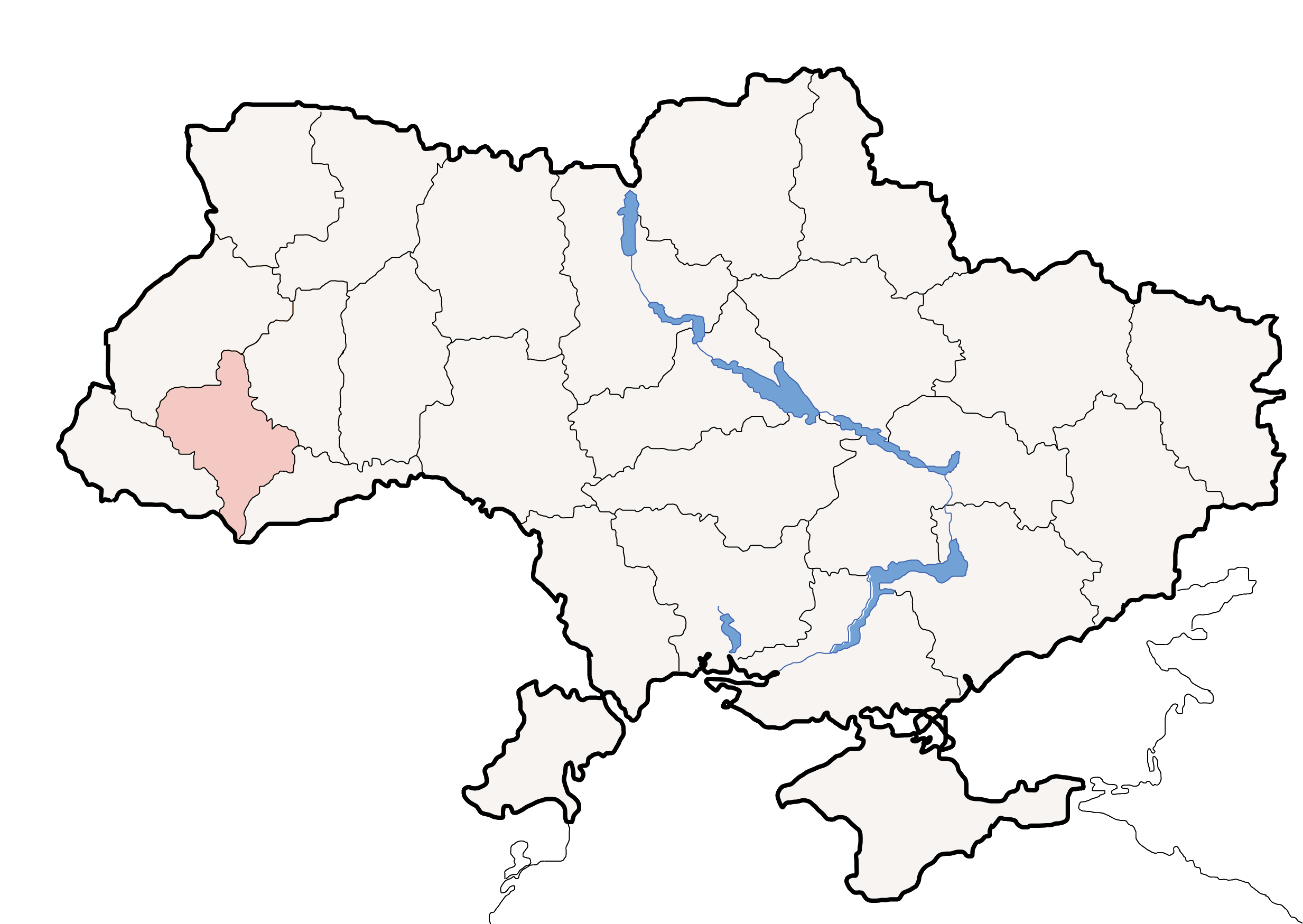
Ivano-Frankivsk Oblast is located in western Ukraine.

This is a list of villages of the Ivano-Frankivsk Oblast (province) of western Ukraine. There are currently 765 villages (Ukrainian: села, sela) within Ivano-Frankivsk Oblast.

== Ivano-Frankivsk Raion ==
- Antonivka
- Babche
- Babuhiv
- Benkivtsi
- Berezivka
- Berezivka
- Bliudnyky
- Bohrivka
- Bohorodchany
- Bortnyky
- Bratkivtsi
- Budzyn
- Bukachivska Sloboda
- Bovshiv
- Boyky
- Bryn
- Byshiv
- Cherche
- Cherniv
- Chesnyky
- Dzvyniach
- Hlybivka
- Hlyboka
- Hrokholyna
- Hrabovets
- Huta
- Ivanykivka
- Khmelivka
- Kosmach
- Kryvets
- Krychka
- Kryvnia
- Kuttsi
- Lopushnia
- Lukovets-Vyshnivskyi
- Lukvytsia
- Lypivka
- Manyava
- Mariyampil
- Markova
- Maydan
- Mizhhiria
- Monastyrchany
- Novochyn
- Pidhiria
- Porohy
- Pokhivka
- Rakovets
- Rosilna
- Sadzhava
- Solotvyn
- Stari Bohorodchany
- Starunia
- Tyaziv
- Uhryniv
- Vasiuchyn
- Vilshanytsia
- Yablunka
- Yunashkiv
- Zaberezhia
- Zhuraky

== Kalush Raion ==
- Anhelivka
- Babyn-Zarichnyi
- Beleyiv
- Berlohy
- Broshniv
- Duba
- Dubshary
- Hrabiv
- Hrynkiv
- Ilemnia
- Ivanivka
- Kamin
- Kniazivske
- Krasne
- Nebyliv
- Nyzhnii Strutyn
- Rakhyna
- Spas

- Stankova
- Staryi Uhryniv
- Sukhodil
- Svarychiv
- Topilske
- Tsineva
- Velyka Turia
- Verbivka
- Verkhnii Strutyn
- Vilkhivka
- Vylky
- Vytvytsia
- Zakernychne

== Kolomyia Raion ==
- Babianka
- Balyntsi
- Beleluia
- Beremiany
- Bilka
- Bohorodychyn
- Bodnariv
- Borschiv
- Cheremkhiv
- Chortovets

- Dzhurkiv
- Hody-Dobrovidka
- Lisnyi Khlibychyn
- Torhovytsia
- Velesnytsia Nyzhnia
- Velyka Kamianka
- Verbivtsi
- Vikno
- Vynohrad
- Zelenyi Yar

== Kosiv Raion ==
- Akreshory
- Babyn
- Bania-Bereziv
- Brusturiv
- Kosmach

== Nadvirna Raion ==
- Bili Oslavy
- Bilozoryna
- Bukove
- Bystrytsia
- Chorni Oslavy
- Chornyi Potik
- Havrylivka
- Prychil
- Verkhnii Maidan
- Volosiv
- Vyshnivtsi
- Zarichchia
- Zghary

== Verkhovyna Raion ==
- Barvinkiv
- Dzembronia
- Iltsi
- Zelene

== See also ==
- List of Canadian place names of Ukrainian origin
