= Chornyi Potik =

Chornyi Potik (Ukrainian: Чорний Потік) may refer to several places in Ukraine:

== Places ==
Chernivtsi Oblast

- Chornyi Potik, Chernivtsi Oblast, village in Chernivtsi Raion

Ivano-Frankivsk Oblast

- Chornyi Potik, Ivano-Frankivsk Oblast, village in Nadvirna Raion

Zakarpattia Oblast

- Chornyi Potik, Berehove Raion, Zakarpattia Oblast, village in Berehove Raion
- Chornyi Potik, Khust Raion, Zakarpattia Oblast, village in Khust Raion
