= Zarichchia =

Zarichchia is the name of various places in Ukraine:

== Villages ==
- Zarichchia — Autonomous Republic of Crimea, Nyzhniohirskyi Raion
- Zarichchia — Cherkasy Oblast, Zvenyhorodka Raion
- Zarichchia — Chernihiv Oblast, Novhorod-Siverskyi Raion
- Zarichchia — Chernihiv Oblast, Koriukivka Raion
- Zarichchia — Chernivtsi Oblast, Vyzhnytsia Raion
- Zarichchia — Vinnytsia Oblast, Haisyn Raion
- Zarichchia — Volyn Oblast, Volodymyr Raion
- Zarichchia — Volyn Oblast, Kovel Raion
- Zarichchia — Volyn Oblast, Manevychi Raion
- Zarichchia — Dnipropetrovsk Oblast, Kamianske Raion
- Zarichchia — Zhytomyr Oblast, Korosten Raion
- Zarichchia — Zhytomyr Oblast, Ovruch Raion
- Zarichchia — Zhytomyr Oblast, Ruzhyn Raion
- Zarichchia — Zakarpattia Oblast, Irshava Raion
- Zarichchia — Ivano-Frankivsk Oblast, Kalush Raion
- Zarichchia — Ivano-Frankivsk Oblast, Nadvirna Raion, Deliatyn settlement hromada
- Zarichchia — Kyiv Oblast, Obukhiv Raion
- Zarichchia — Khmelnytskyi Oblast, Shepetivka Raion, Bilohiria settlement hromada
- Zarichchia — Khmelnytskyi Oblast, Shepetivka Raion, Iziaslav urban hromada
- Zarichchia — Kirovohrad Oblast, Novoukrainka Raion
- Zarichchia — Lviv Oblast, Sambir Raion, Biskovytsia rural hromada
- Zarichchia — Lviv Oblast, Sambir Raion, Borynia settlement hromada
- Zarichchia — Lviv Oblast, Sambir Raion, Khyriv urban hromada
- Zarichchia — Lviv Oblast, Sambir Raion, Voyutytsia Village Council
- Zarichchia — Lviv Oblast, Stryi Raion
- Zarichchia — Lviv Oblast, Yavoriv Raion, Mostyska urban hromada
- Zarichchia — Lviv Oblast, Yavoriv Raion, Sudova Vyshnia urban hromada
- Zarichchia — Poltava Oblast, Orzhytsia Raion
- Zarichchia — Poltava Oblast, Pyriatyn Raion
- Zarichchia — Sumy Oblast, Krolevets Raion
- Zarichchia — Sumy Oblast, Romny Raion
- Zarichchia — Sumy Oblast, Seredyna-Buda Raion

- Zarichchia — former village of Bilohirsk Raion of the Autonomous Republic of Crimea, deregistered on March 22, 2007
- Zarichchia — village of Zolochiv Raion of Lviv Oblast, attached to the city of Zolochiv
- Zarichchia — village of Lviv Raion of Lviv Oblast, attached to the urban-type settlement of Shchyrets
- Zarichchia — the village of Bilhorod-Dnistrovskyi Raion of Odesa Oblast, attached to the village of Velykomarianivka
- Zarichchia — former village of Trokhimivska village council of Ivanivka Raion of Kherson Oblast, deregistered
- Zarichchia — the village was annexed to the town of Proskurov on June 1, 1946 (since 1954 - Khmelnytskyi), now - the exhibition raion
- Zarichchia — former village of Bohorodchany Raion of Stanislav Oblast, attached to the village of Stari Bohorodchany

== Other ==
- Zarichchia —general zoological reserve in the town of Horodyshche, Cherkasy Oblast
- Zarichchia — forest reserve in the Volyn Oblast
- Zarichchia — park in Khmelnytskyi
- Zarichchia — protected tract in the Ivano-Frankivsk Oblast
- Zarichchia — area in the city of Zhmerynka, Vinnytsia Oblast
- Zarichchia — area in the city of Fastiv, Kyiv Oblast

== See also ==
- Zarichchya (formerly known in Russian as Zarech’ye), a neighborhood of Bila Tserkva, Kyiv oblast, Ukraine, which became incorporated into the city in 1960.
- Zarzecze (disambiguation)
