= Bukhtivets =

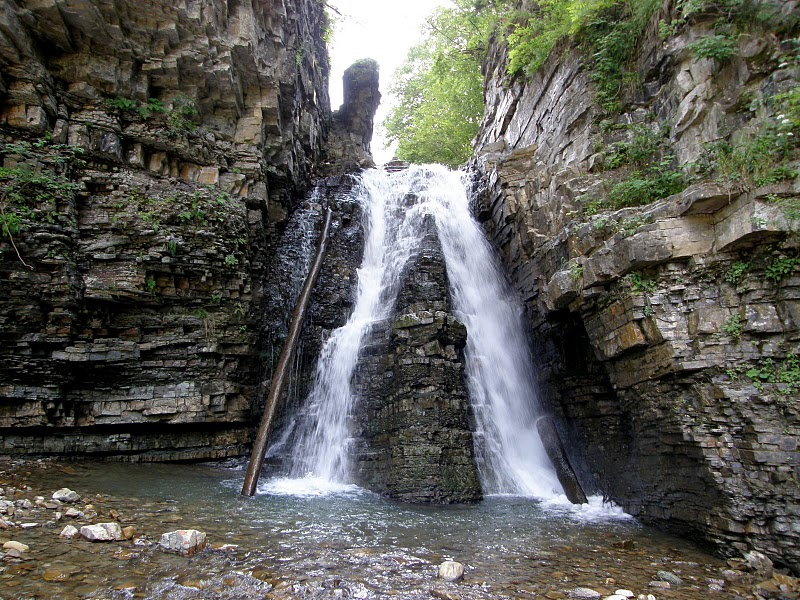

- Location within Ivano-Frankivsk Oblast Location within Ukraine
- Location: Nadvirna Raion, Ivano-Frankivsk Oblast, Ukraine
- Coordinates: 48°36′N 24°22′E
- Elevation: 660 metres (2,170 ft)
- Total height: 8 metres (26 ft)
- Watercourse: Bukhtivets River

The Bukhtivets waterfall (Ukrainian: Бухтівецький водоспад) is located on the Bukhtivets River, near the village of Bukove, Nadvirna Raion, Ivano-Frankivsk Oblast.

== See also ==
- List of waterfalls
- Waterfalls of Ukraine
