= Bili Oslavy =

Rural locality in Ivano-Frankivsk Oblast, Ukraine

Bili Oslavy Білі Ослави Polish: Osławy Białe
- Village
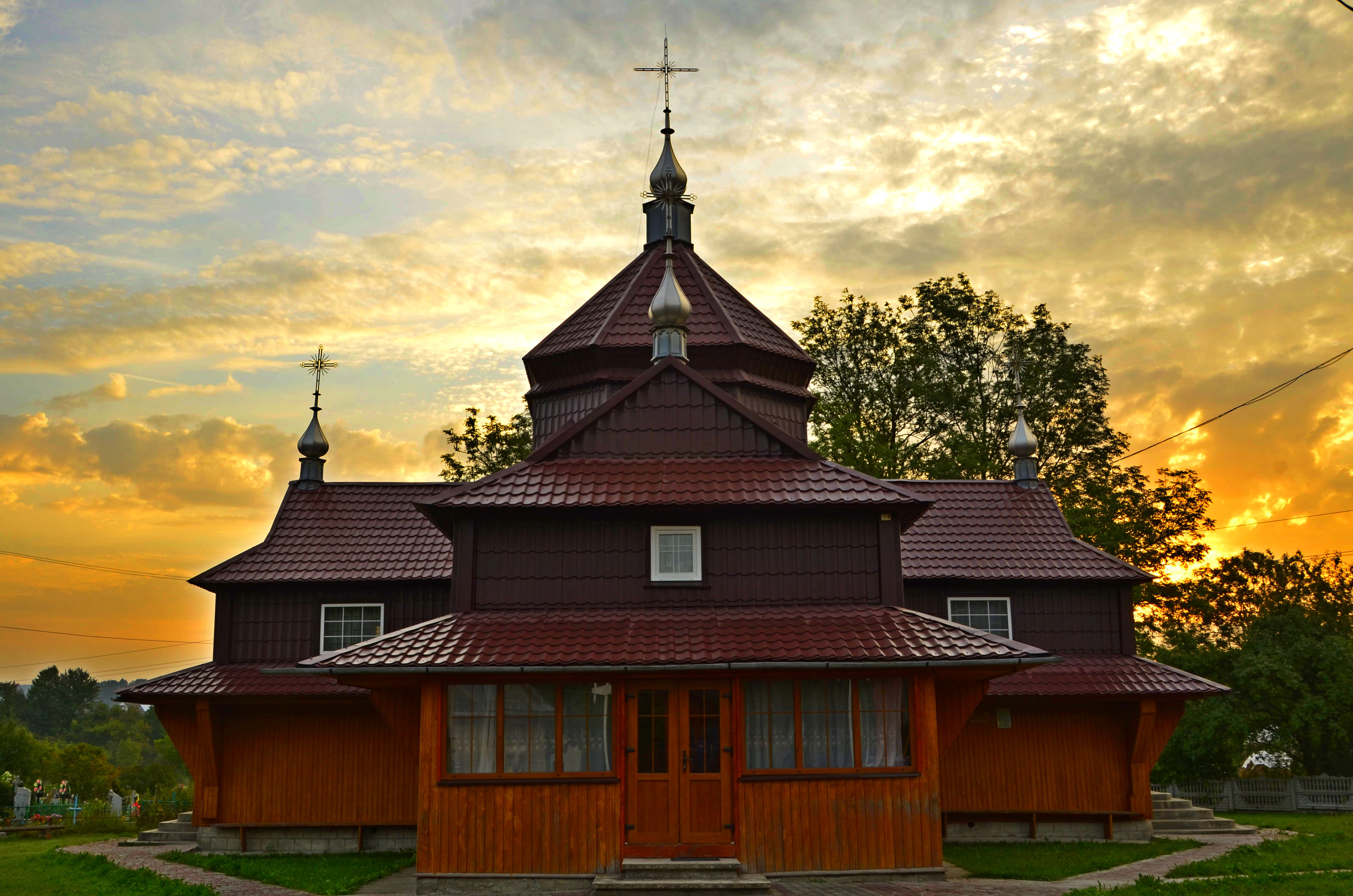

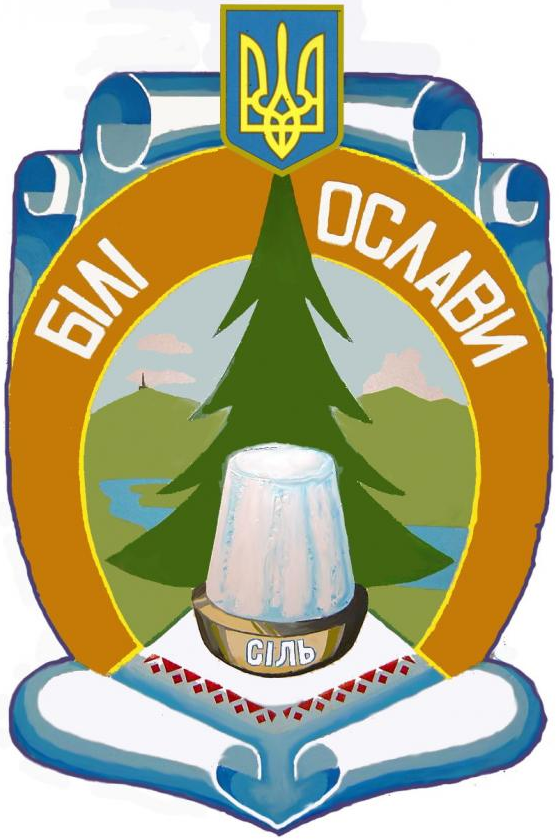
- Coat of arms

- Location within Ivano-Frankivsk Oblast Location within Ukraine
- Coordinates: 48°28′51″N 24°42′07″E
- Country: Ukraine
- Oblast (province): Ivano-Frankivsk Oblast
- Raion (district): Nadvirna Raion
- Hromada (municipality): Deliatyn settlement hromada
- Founded: 1552
- Elevation: 515 m (1,690 ft)

Population (2001)
  - Total: 4,225
- Postal code: 78460
- Area code: +380 3475

Bili Oslavy (Ukrainian: Білі Ослави; Polish: Osławy Białe) is a village in Nadvirna Raion of Ivano-Frankivsk Oblast of Ukraine. It belongs to Deliatyn settlement hromada, one of the hromadas of Ukraine.

== History ==
Bili Oslavy was founded in around 1552, and the first written mention of its current name occurred in 1745.

Father Ivan Mandychevskyi was the parish priest in the village. In 1823, he had a son, the future Greek Catholic priest Porfiry, who later became the organizer of the coronation of the Miraculous Icon of the Mother of God of Zarvany. During the Kovpak raid, the police department shot dead 71 villagers.

On 1 August 1934, the rural gmina of Osławy Białe was formed, the center of which was Osławy Białe. The commune was formed from the previous self-governing rural gmina: Osławy Białe, Czarny Osław, Czarny Potok, Zarzecze nad Prutem. According to the regional administration of the MGB, in 1949 in the Yaremcha Raion, the underground organization OUN was most active in the villages of Bili Oslavy and Chorni Oslavy. On 9 September 1967, an obelisk to the victims of Nazism was erected in the village. A monument to Taras Shevchenko was also installed in the village.

On 14 July 2014, the world's first monument to the famous Ukrainian poet Mariika Pidhirianka was solemnly opened and consecrated in her homeland in the village of Bili Oslavy.
