= Abraham David Wahrman =

Galician Talmudist

Abraham David Wahrman of Buchach (1770 at Nadvirna – 1840 at Buchach) (Hebrew: אברהם דוד מבוטשאטש), was a Galician Talmudist.

== Biography ==
He began studying Talmud as a boy. When he was ten years old, Zvi Hirsch Karo, the author of Neta' Sha'ashu'im, chose him as a son-in-law. At the age of twenty, he became the rabbi at Yazlovets.

In the Jewish Encyclopedia, Louis Ginzberg and A. Pelginsky dramatically recount his encounter with Hasidism:

The chief event of his life was the struggle awakened in him by the opposition between the Talmud and the Cabala. Unacquainted with the tendencies and modes of life of the Hasidim, Buczacz did not believe in the miracles of their rabbis; and his wife and friends had great difficulty in persuading him to take his sick son to a Hasidic rabbi, Levi Isaac of Berdychev. The latter, however, influenced him to take up the study of the Cabala; but in trying to reconcile these new views—so utterly antagonistic to those of the extreme Talmudists, which he himself had hitherto held—he nearly became insane. The Hasidic rabbi Levi Isaac of Berdychev helped him through this struggle and won him over, to the great joy of the Hasidim, who feared his wide Talmudic learning. Buczacz adopted the Hasidic mode of living; but in his decision of halakic questions was guided, not by kabalistic, but by purely Talmudic, principles.

In 1813 he succeeded his late father-in-law as rabbi of Buchach, and remained in office until his death.

== Works ==
Buczacz is the author of the following works:

1. Da'at Kedoshim, to the Shulchan Aruch, Yoreh De'ah, Lemberg, 1870; 2d ed., ib. 1879;
2. Dibre Abot, commentary on Pirkei Avoth, ib. 1879;
3. Eshel Avraham, annotations to the Shulchan Aruch, Orach Chayim, ib. 1885;
4. Ezer MiKodesh, annotations to the Shulchan Aruch, Even HaEzer
5. Birkat David, cabalistic-haggadic commentary on Genesis, Zolkiev (date 1766, given on title-page, wrong);
6. Machazeh Abraham, commentary on the Pentateuch, and Chozeh David, on the other Biblical books, Lemberg, 1871;
7. Amarot Tehorot, on the purification of Niddah and vessels, in Yiddish, ib. 1878;
8. Tefillah le-David, on benediction and prayer, ib. 1886; Kolomea, 1887;
9. Tehillah le-David, on the Psalms, ib. 1872.
