= Chorni Oslavy =

Rural locality in Ivano-Frankivsk Oblast, Ukraine

Chorni Oslavy Чорні Ослави Polish: Osławy Czarne
- Village
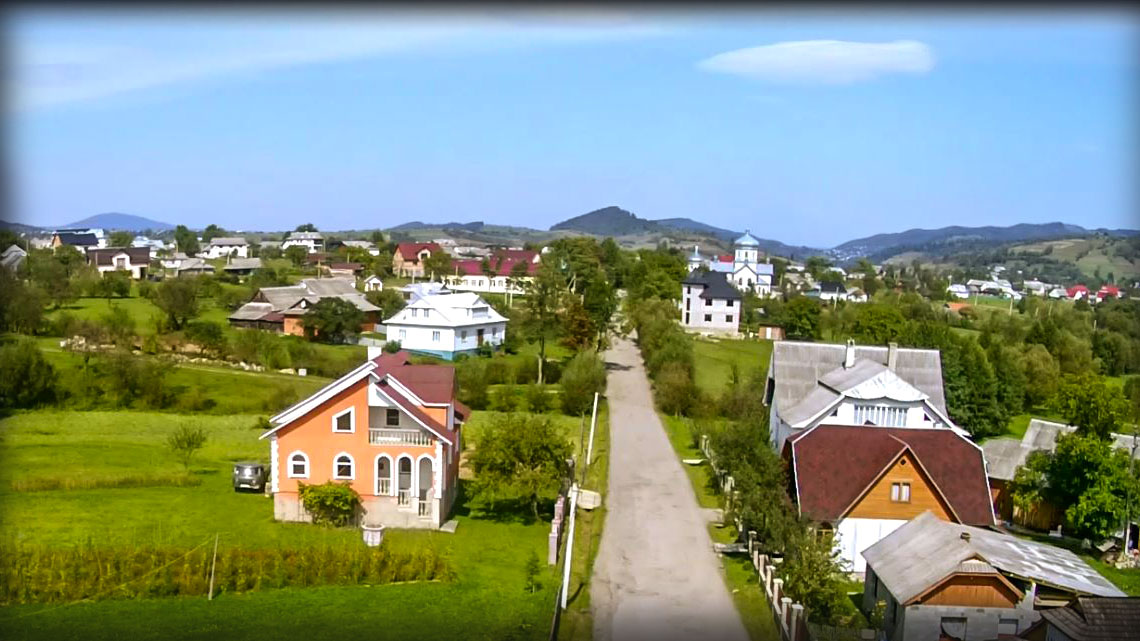

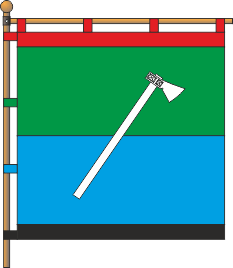
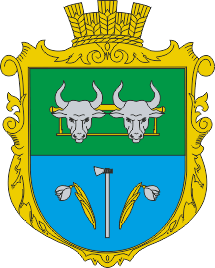
- Seal Coat of arms

- Location within Ivano-Frankivsk Oblast Location within Ukraine
- Coordinates: 48°27′35″N 24°44′46″E
- Country: Ukraine
- Oblast (province): Ivano-Frankivsk Oblast
- Raion (district): Nadvirna Raion
- Hromada (municipality): Deliatyn settlement hromada
- Elevation: 514 m (1,686 ft)

Population (2001)
  - Total: 1,765
- Postal code: 78462
- Area code: +380 3475

Chorni Oslavy (Ukrainian: Чорні Ослави; Polish: Osławy Czarne) is a village in Nadvirna Raion of Ivano-Frankivsk Oblast of Ukraine. It belongs to Deliatyn settlement hromada, one of the hromadas of Ukraine.

== History ==
According to the regional administration of the MGB, in 1949 in the Yaremcha Raion, the underground organization OUN was most active in the villages of Bili Oslavy and Chorni Oslavy.
