= Pererisl rural hromada =

Rural hromada of Ivano-Frankivsk Oblast, Ukraine

Pererisl rural hromada Переріслянська сільська громада
- Hromada
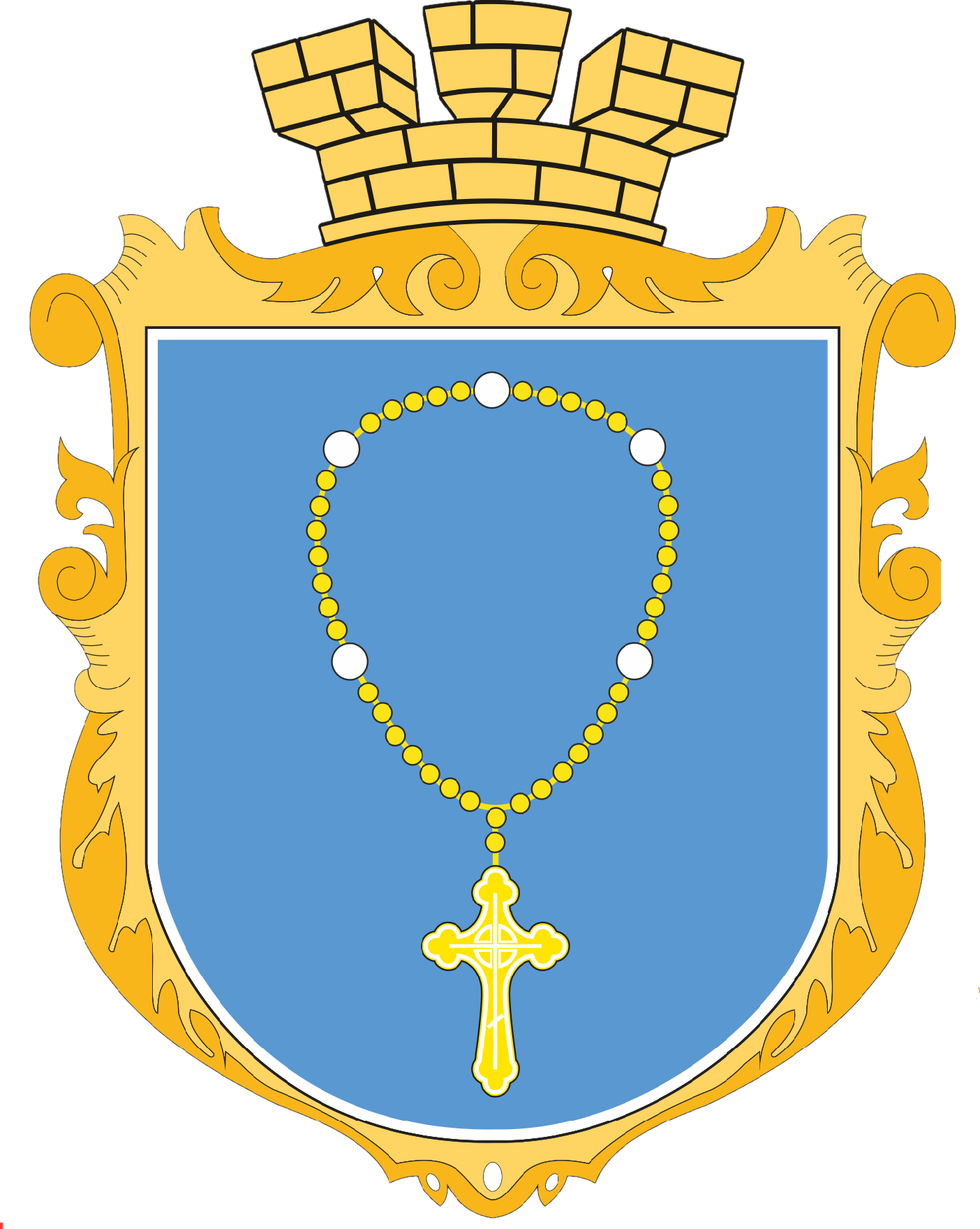
- Seal
- Interactive map of Pererisl rural hromada
- Country: Ukraine
- Oblast: Ivano-Frankivsk
- Raion: Nadvirna

Area
  - Total: 96.5 km^{2} (37.3 sq mi)

Population (2023)
  - Total: 9,351
  - Density: 96.9/km^{2} (251/sq mi)
- Settlements: 5
- Villages: 5
- Website: pererislyanska-gromada.gov.ua

Pererisl rural territorial hromada (Ukrainian: Переріслянська сільська територіальна громада, romanized: Pererislianska silska terytorialna hromada) is one of Ukraine's hromadas, located in Nadvirna Raion within Ivano-Frankivsk Oblast. Its administrative centre is the village of Pererisl.

The hromada has a total area of 96.5 km^{2} (37.3 mi^{2}), as well as a population of 9,351 (as of 2023).

Prior to decentralisation in Ukraine, Pererisl rural hromada was an amalgamated hromada. It was expanded to its current size as part of decentralisation.

== Composition ==
The hromada includes five villages:

- Fytkiv
- Havrylivka
- Pererisl
- Tsutsyliv
- Volosiv
