= Pererisl =

Village in Ivano-Frankivsk Oblast, Ukraine

Pererisl Перерісль
- Village
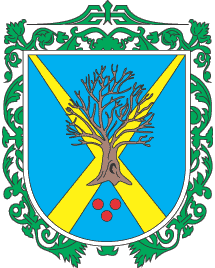
- Coat of arms

- Location of Pererisl in Ivano-Frankivsk Oblast Location of Pererisl in Ukraine
- Coordinates: 48°41′58″N 24°38′22″E
- Country: Ukraine
- Oblast: Ivano-Frankivsk Oblast
- Raion: Nadvirna Raion
- First mentioned: 1424

Population
  - Total: 2,430

Pererisl (Ukrainian: Перерісль; Polish: Przerośl) is a village in Nadvirna Raion, in the western Ivano-Frankivsk Oblast of Ukraine. It is the administrative centre of Pererisl rural hromada.

== History ==
Pererisl was first mentioned in a 1424 document in which the village's chieftain, Khodko Holovachyn, sold half the village to his brother for 30 silver grivnas. In 1939, the village had a population of 1,980 people, including 1,660 Ukrainian Greek Catholics, 280 Ukrainian Roman Catholics, 20 Polish people, and 20 Jews.

Residents of the village participated in anti-Soviet resistance by the Ukrainian Insurgent Army, raising the flag of Ukraine in the village centre on 31 October 1953.

== Notable residents ==
- Ihor Boichuk, Ukrainian journalist
- Mykola Ersteniuk, Austrian-Ukrainian jurist and soldier in the Imperial-Royal Landwehr and Ukrainian Galician Army
- Antin Kobylianskyi, Ukrainian writer
- Fedir Mykytyshyn, Ukrainian Insurgent Army commander
- Omelian Reviuk, Ukrainian-American journalist
