= Zarzecze =

Zarzecze may refer to the following places in Poland:

== Silesian Voivodeship (south Poland) ==
- Zarzecze, Katowice, a district of the city of Katowice
- Zarzecze, Cieszyn County
- Zarzecze, Zawiercie County
- Zarzecze, Żywiec County

== Lesser Poland Voivodeship (south Poland) ==
- Zarzecze, Nowy Sącz County
- Zarzecze, Olkusz County

== Łódź Voivodeship (central Poland) ==
- Zarzecze, Bełchatów County
- Zarzecze, Rawa County

== Lublin Voivodeship (east Poland) ==
- Zarzecze, Chełm County
- Zarzecze, Puławy County
- Zarzecze, Zamość County

== Podkarpackie Voivodeship (south-east Poland) ==
- Zarzecze, Nisko County
- Zarzecze, Przeworsk County
- Zarzecze, Rzeszów County
- Zarzecze, Jasło County

== Other voivodeships ==
- Zarzecze, Podlaskie Voivodeship (north-east Poland)
- Zarzecze, Pomeranian Voivodeship (north Poland)
- Zarzecze, Świętokrzyskie Voivodeship (south-central Poland)
- Zarzecze, West Pomeranian Voivodeship (north-west Poland)

== Other uses ==
- the Polish name for Užupis, Lithuania

== See also ==
- Zarichchia (disambiguation)
