= Deliatyn =

Rural locality in Ivano-Frankivsk Oblast, Ukraine

Deliatyn Делятин
- Rural settlement
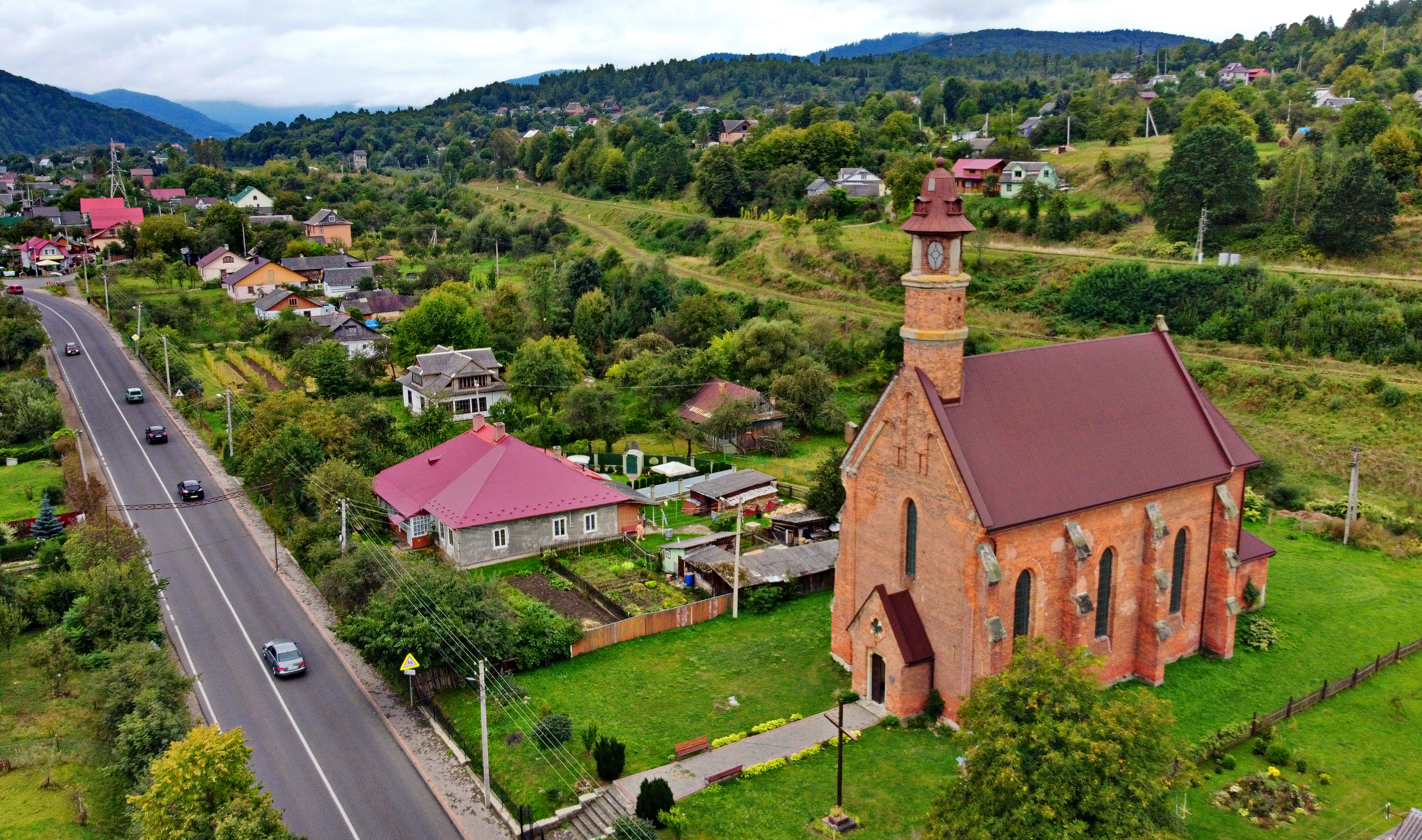

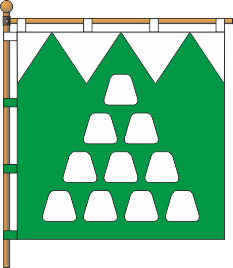
- Flag Coat of arms

- Location within Ivano-Frankivsk Oblast Location within Ukraine
- Coordinates: 48°31′43″N 24°37′25″E
- Country: Ukraine
- Oblast: Ivano-Frankivsk Oblast
- Raion: Nadvirna Raion
- Hromada: Deliatyn settlement hromada
- Founded: 1400

Population (2024)
  - Total: 8,000

Deliatyn (Ukrainian: Делятин, pronounced [deˈlʲɑtɪn]; Polish: Delatyn), is a rural settlement in Nadvirna Raion, Ivano-Frankivsk Oblast, Ukraine. It is located 101 kilometers (63 miles) west of Chernivtsi and 294.6 miles (474.1 kilometers) west-southwest of Kyiv. Together with Yaremche and Lanchyn it is part of a small agglomeration that runs along the Prut River valley between the Carpathian Mountains. Deliatyn hosts the administration of Deliatyn settlement hromada, one of the hromadas of Ukraine. The population is 8,213 (2022 estimate).

Deliatyn is first mentioned in documents on 9 March 1400. In 1554 Deliatyn received the status of a city, and from 1579 the status of a city with Magdeburg rights. The economic basis for the development of Deliatyn was the extraction of salt and salt production.

In 1940 it received the status of an urban-type settlement, and on 13 November 1940, it entered the Yaremcha Raion. From 30 December 1962, it was part of the Bohorodchany Raion, but Deliatyn was assigned to the Nadvirna Raion. On 17 August 2017, it became the center of the Deliatyn settlement hromada.

== Name ==
The name of the town had different forms over the centuries: Daliatyn (1400—1440), Deliatyn (1440—1960, 1990), Diliatyn (1961— 2 October 1989). It is believed that the name comes from the names of the legendary founders of the town: Dalia (or Dylia) and Tyna. The Latin word "delatum" meant the place where products were brought to the auction.

== History ==
Deliatyn became part of the Kingdom of Poland (together with Red Ruthenia) in the 14th century under King Casimir III the Great. In 1772, it was seized by the Austro-Hungarian Empire together with the province of Galicia in the First Partition of Poland. In 1893, Austrian Deliatyn experienced a cholera outbreak amid poor conditions within the town. After World War I and the dissolution of Austria-Hungary, Deliatyn was captured by Polish troops, after the Polish–Soviet War it remained a part of the Stanisławów Voivodeship of the Second Polish Republic. Located in a picturesque area, it was a popular spa, with around 1,000 visitors yearly (in the late 1920s).

Historical population
Year	Pop.	±%
1921	5,973	—
1931	8,815	+47.6%
2022	8,213	−6.8%

Archival views of Delatyn

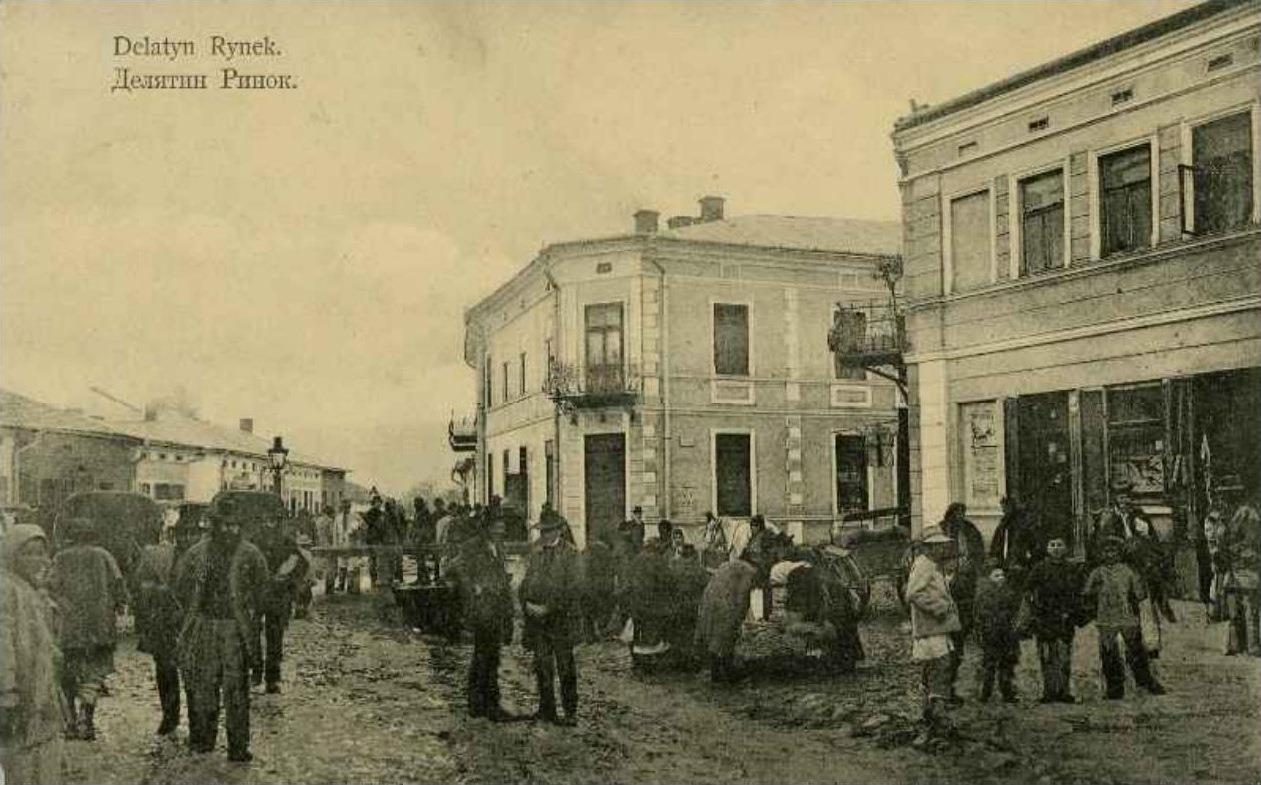
Delatyn in the 1910s

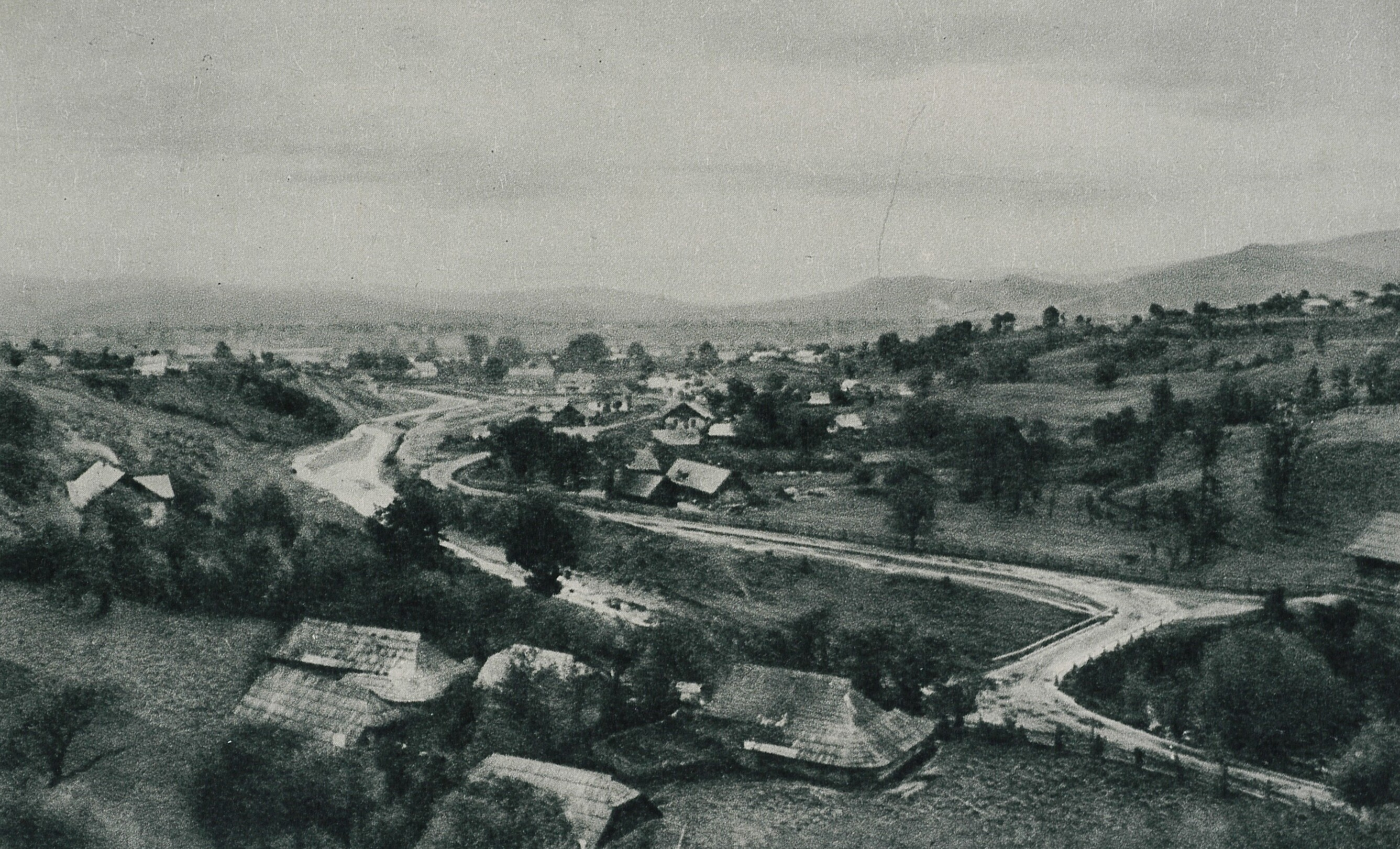
Archival views of Delatyn, ca 1930

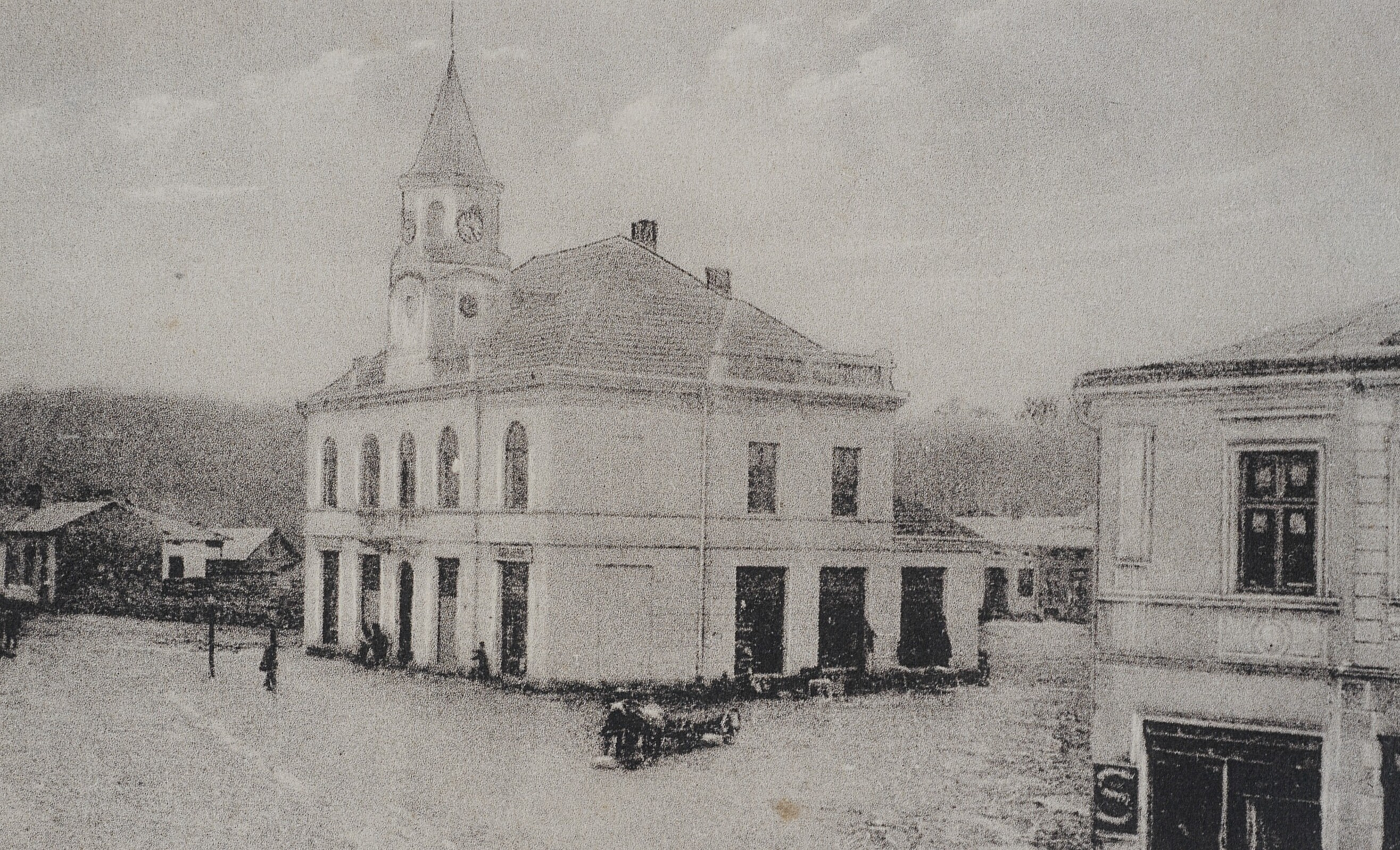
City Hall, 1927

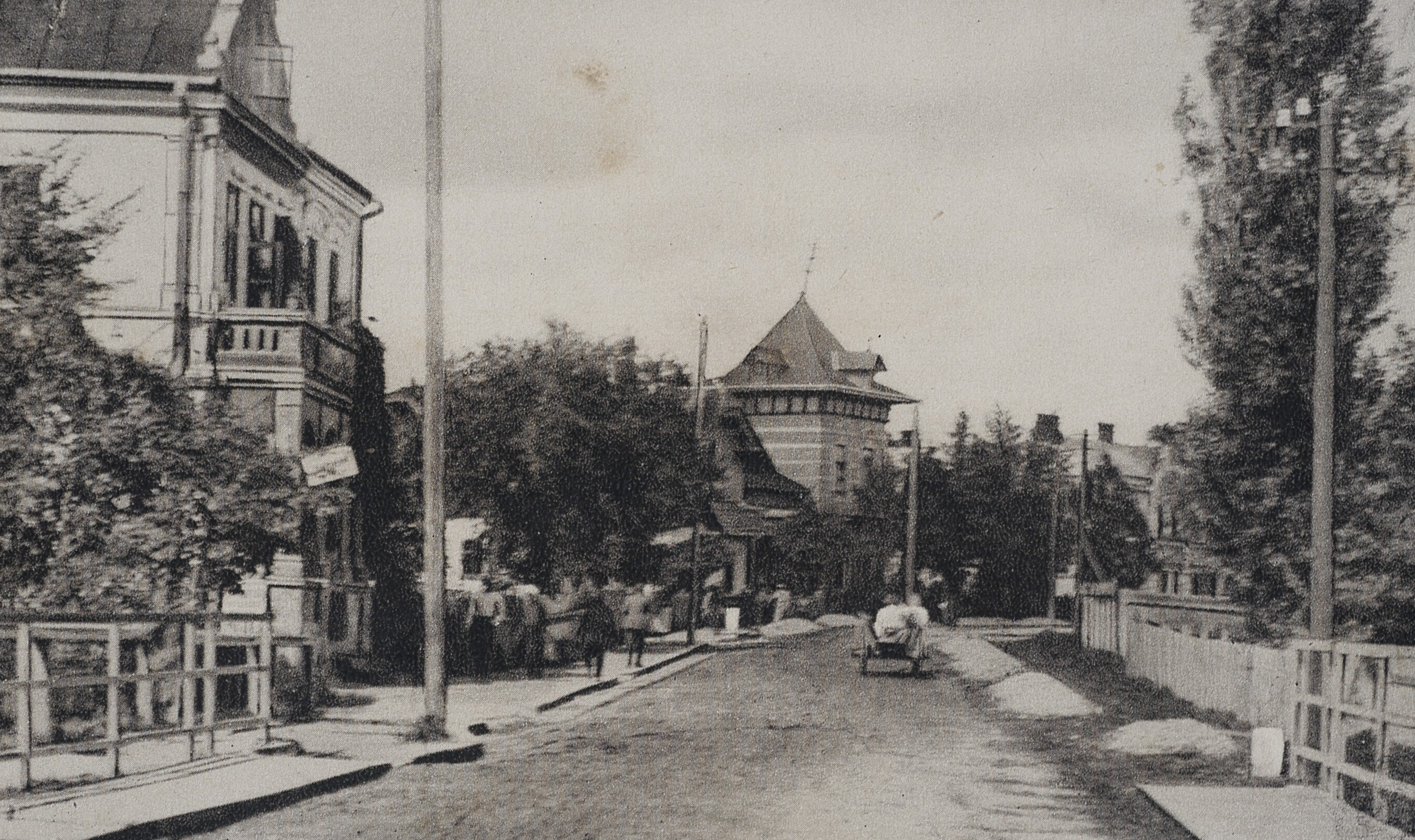
Main street, 1939

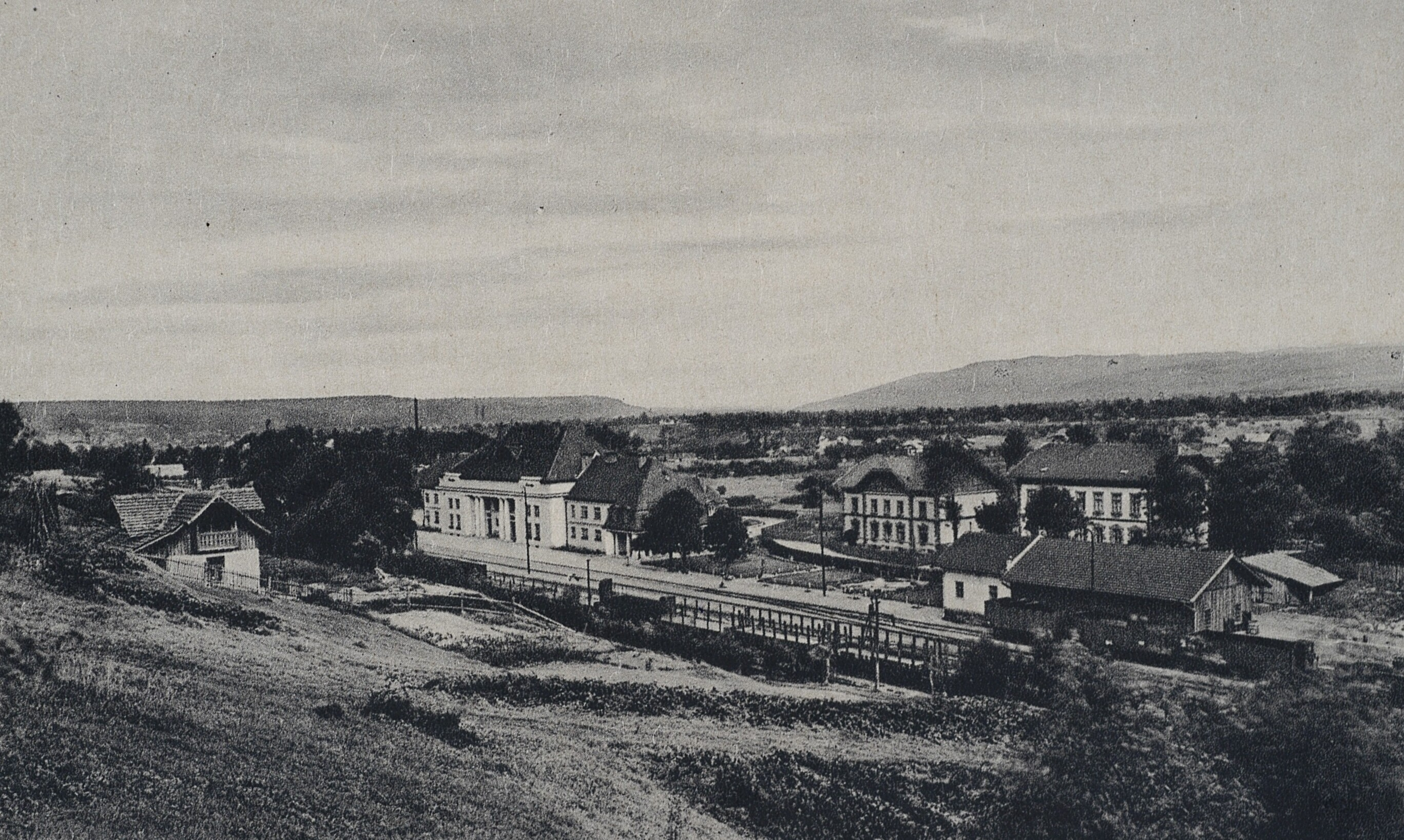
Railway station, circa 1930

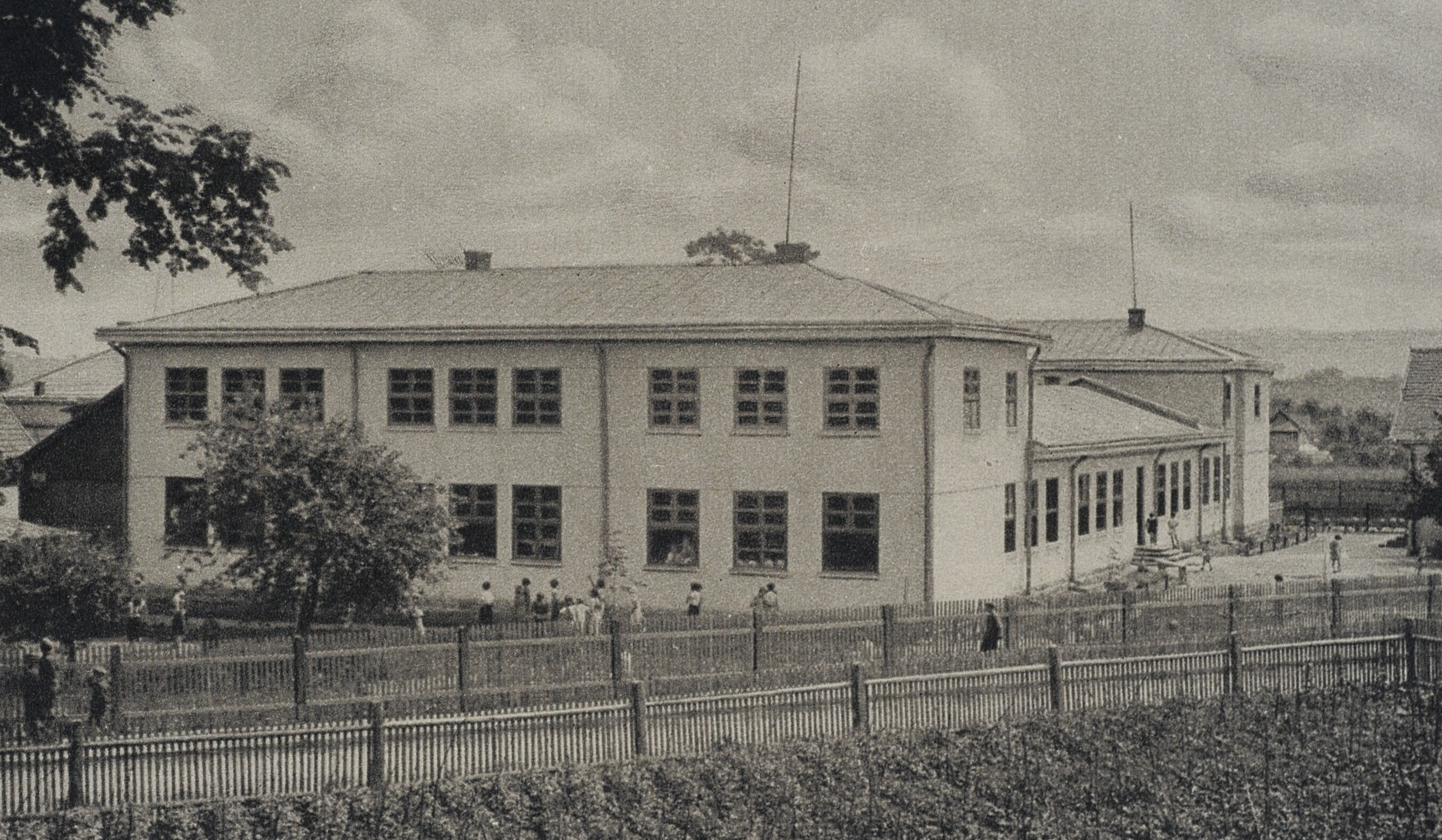
Primary school, before 1939

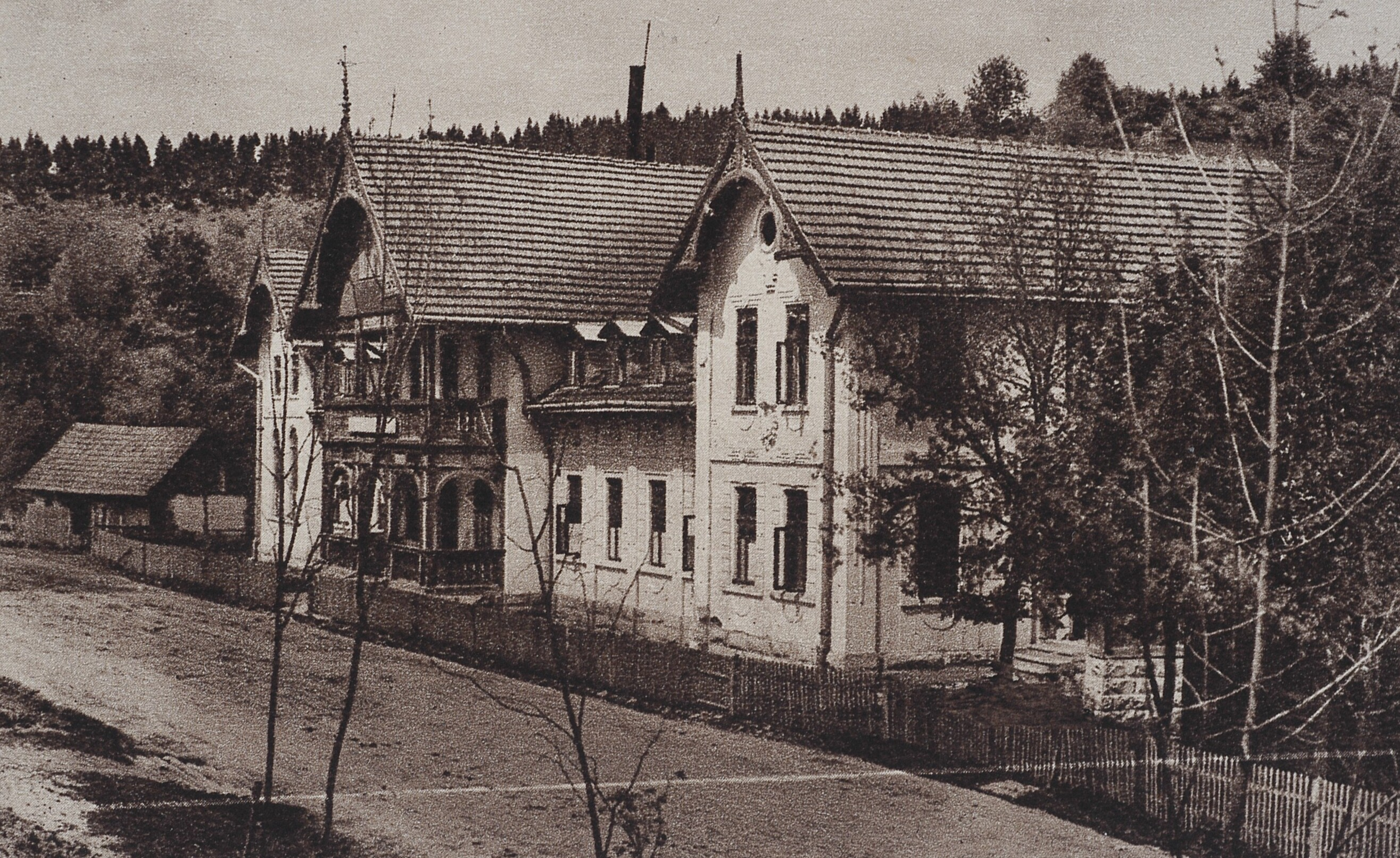
Bathing establishment, 1929

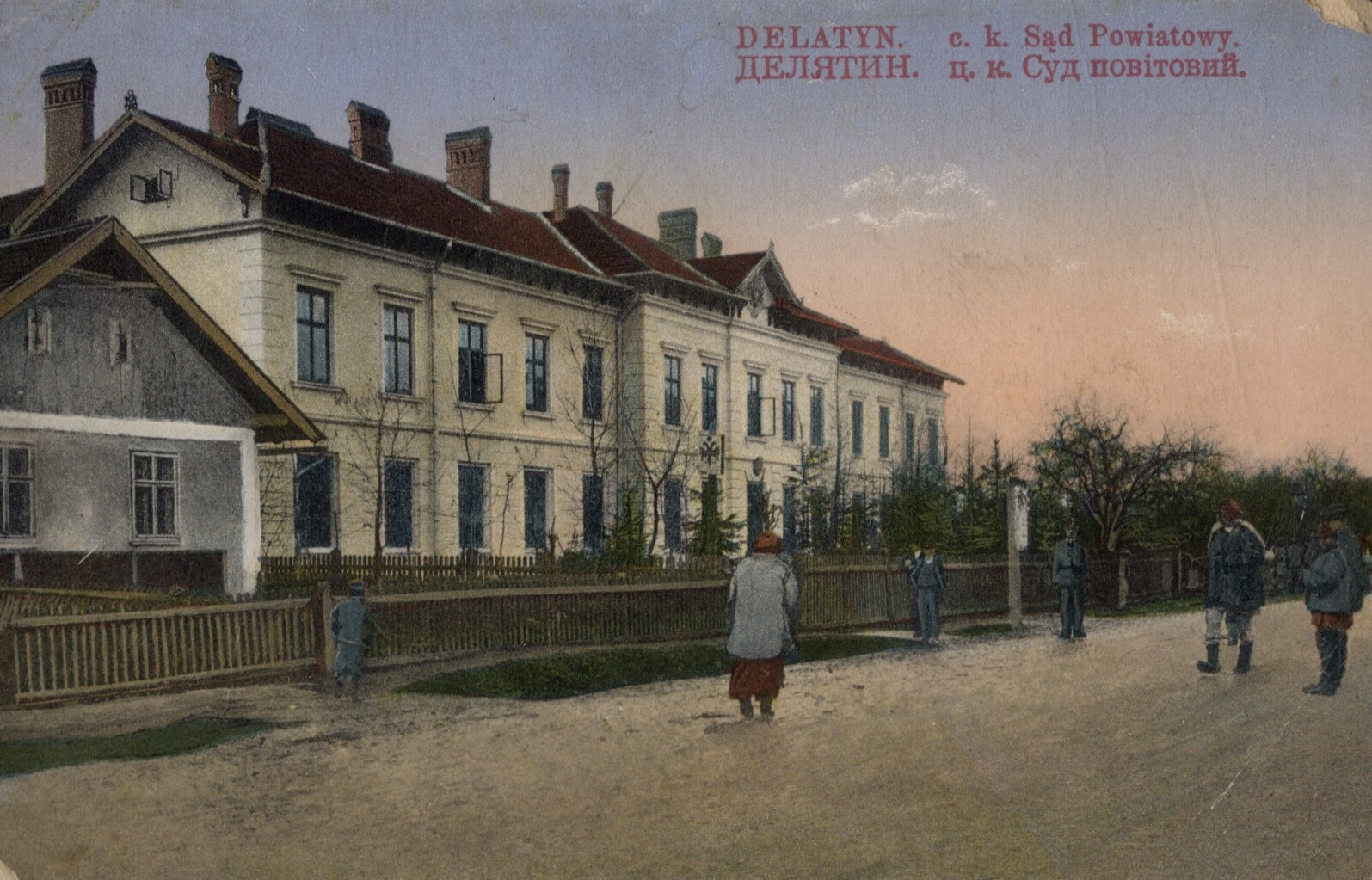
County court, 1914

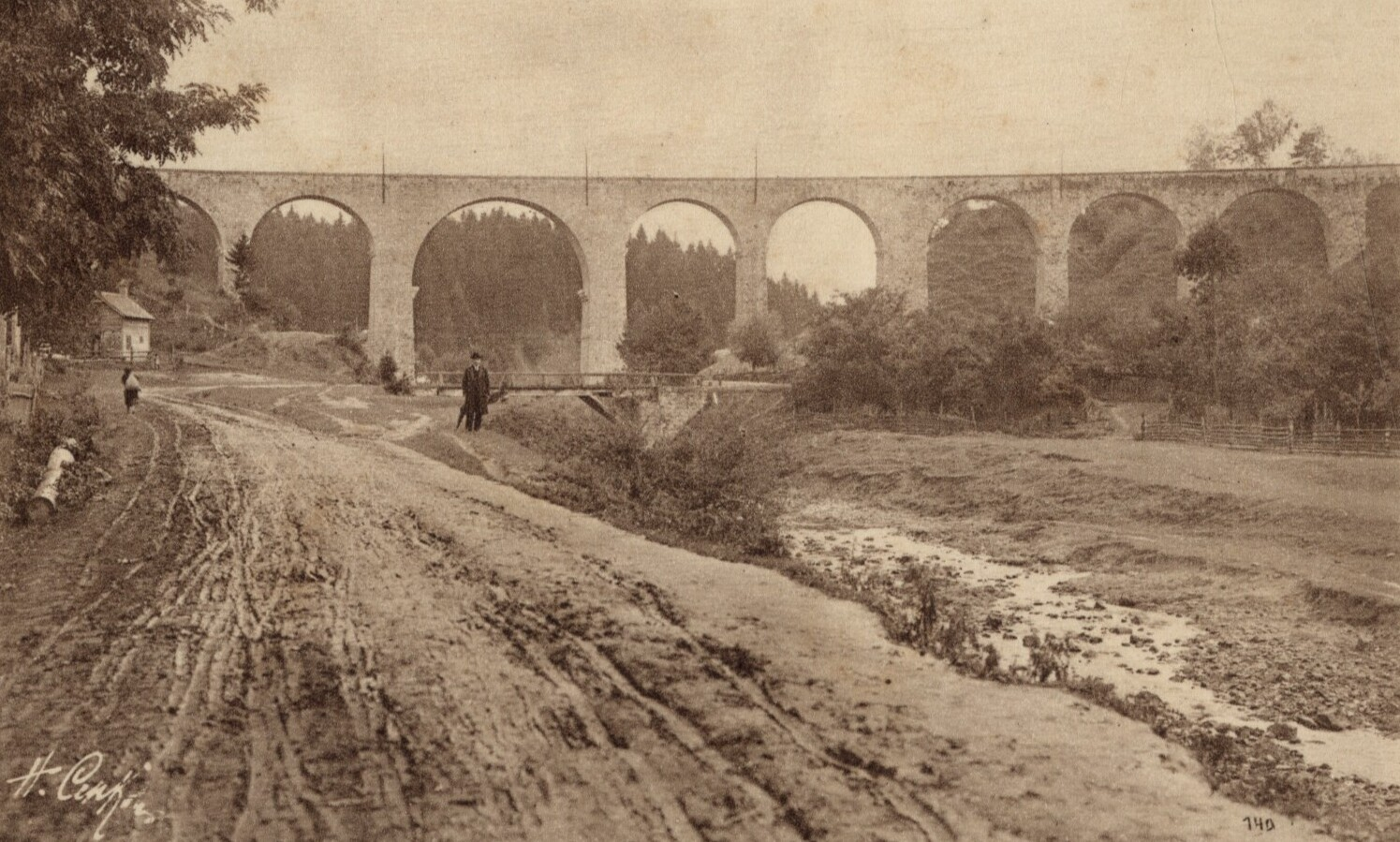
Viaduct, 1927

=== World War II ===
Following the joint German-Soviet invasion of Poland, which started World War II in September 1939, the village was occupied and annexed by the USSR until 1941, then occupied by Germany until 1944, and re-occupied by the Soviet Union, which annexed it from Poland in 1945. During the Soviet times, Deliatyn was famous by the Kovpak's Oak, which symbolizes the uncompromised hatred of Ukrainians towards Nazi Germany.

On 17 January 1940, Deliatyn Raion was separated from Nadwórna County. In 1940 it received the status of an urban-type settlement, and on 13 November 1940, Deliatyn Raion was liquidated and entered the Yaremcha Raion. From 30 December 1962, it was part of the Bohorodchany Raion, but Deliatyn was assigned to the Nadvirna Raion.

Delatyn was home to a Jewish community until autumn 1941. German archives record mass executions of Jews in the town, carried out by an Einsatzgruppen. On 16 October 1941, the SS, accompanied by the Ukrainian militia and Hungarian Border Guards units shot 1,950 Jews in a forest. [Lemberg Mosaic, Jakob Weiss, Alderbrook Press (2010)] Later, around 200 Jews were killed in the cemetery. During spring 1942, 3,000 Jews were shot. The remaining 2,000 Jews were deported from Deliatyn to the Bełżec extermination camp at the end of 1942. According to the archives, there was no ghetto in Deliatyn, although according to a witness there was one in the center, surrounded with a fence.

=== Independent Ukraine ===
On 17 August 2017 Deliatyn settlement hromada was formed by merging the urban municipality of Deliatyn Settlement Council and the rural municipalities of Zarichchia, Chorni Oslavy, and Chornyi Potik of Nadvirna Raion.

==== Russo-Ukrainian War ====
On 19 March 2022 during the 2022 Russian invasion of Ukraine, Russian Armed Forces claim to have used the Kinzhal hypersonic missiles for the first time in world combat history to target a military storage site in Deliatyn.

On 28 April 2022, the executive committee of the Deliatyn settlement council, as part of derussification and decommunization in Ukraine, decided to dismantle monuments-busts and memorial signs on the territory of the hromada, including a bust of the Russian poet Alexander Pushkin on the territory of Deliatyn Lyceum No. 3 and a memorial plaque to Soviet soldiers.

Until 26 January 2024, Deliatyn was designated urban-type settlement. On this day, a new law entered into force which abolished this status, and Deliatyn became a rural settlement.

== In culture ==
The 1992 documentary film Return to My Shtetl Delatyn depicts filmmaker Willy Lindwer's travels with his father Berl Nuchim and his daughter Michal to Delatyn to "retrace the route his father had taken six decades earlier, escaping from the Nazis and to see how the area and its inhabitants had changed."

== Economy ==
Deliatyn is known as a spa, as well as a centre of salt production and forestry.

Delatynite is a variety of amber found in Deliatyn.
