= Zarichchia, Nadvirna Raion, Ivano-Frankivsk Oblast =

Rural locality in Ivano-Frankivsk Oblast, Ukraine

Zarichchia Заріччя Polish: Zarzecze nad Prutem German: Saritschtschja
- Village
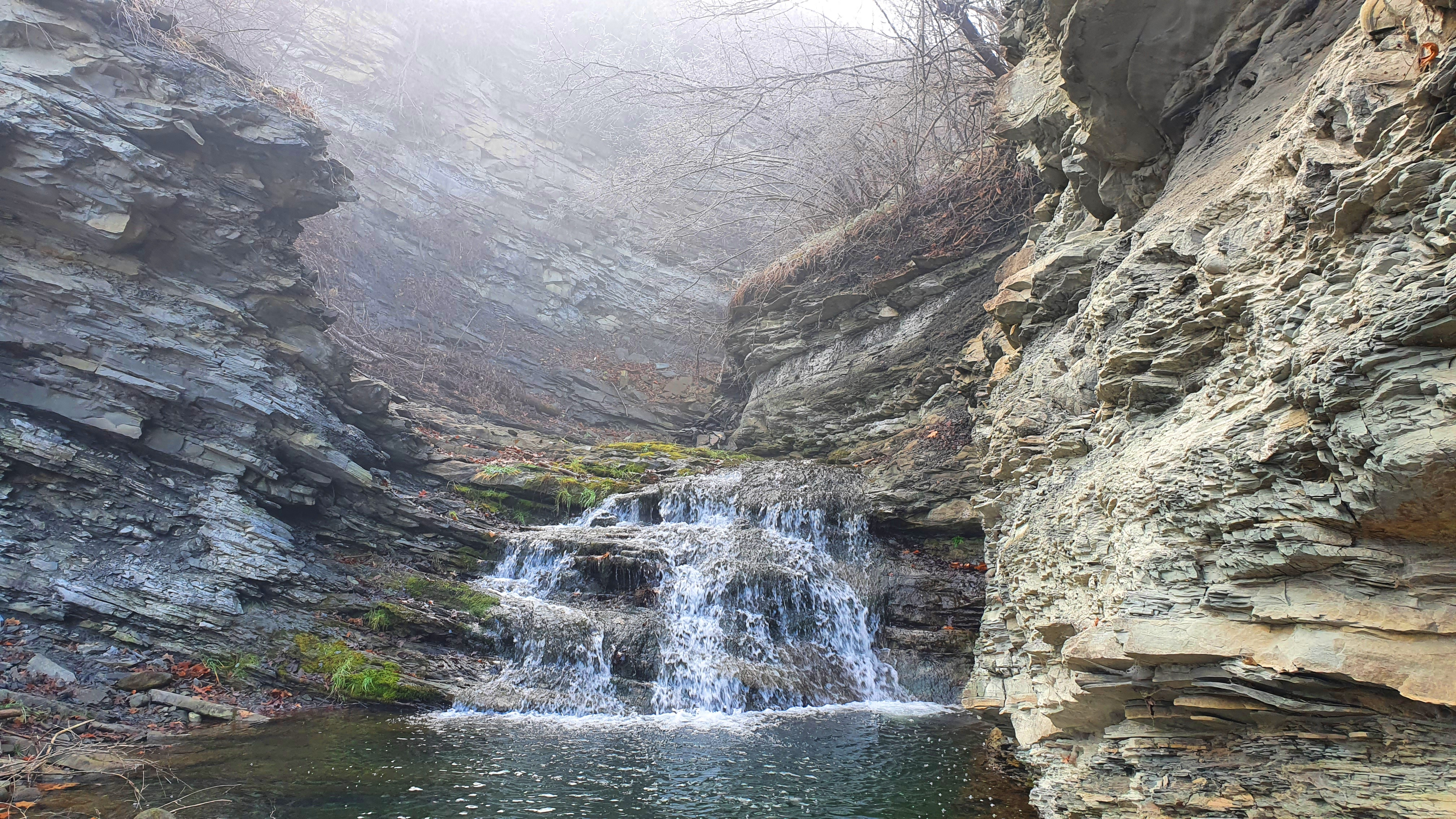
- Zarichchia’s waterfall

- Location within Ivano-Frankivsk Oblast Location within Ukraine
- Coordinates: 48°30′59″N 24°38′39″E
- Country: Ukraine
- Oblast (province): Ivano-Frankivsk Oblast
- Raion (district): Nadvirna Raion
- Hromada (municipality): Deliatyn settlement hromada
- Founded: early 15th century

Population
  - Total: 3,841

Zarichchia (Ukrainian: Зарі́ччя; German: Saritschtschja; Polish: Zarzecze nad Prutem; Yiddish: זאריטש, romanized: Zaritsh) is a village in Nadvirna Raion of Ivano-Frankivsk Oblast of Ukraine. It belongs to Deliatyn settlement hromada, one of the hromadas of Ukraine.

== Geography ==
The village is located in the Pokuttia foothills at a distance of 14 km from the city of Nadvirna, 5 km from the Deliatyn railway station. In the east, Zarichchia is bordered by the village of Bili Oslavy, and in the south by the mountains Malyvo (848 m) and Yavorova (1001 m).

The village is located on a plain 8 km long and 1 to 4 km wide.

The Ivano-Frankivsk — Yabluniv highway passes through the village.

The village stretched for 4 km along the right bank of the Prut River. The Zarichchia waterfall (2 m) is located on the Yasynovets stream, the right tributary of the Prut.

== History ==
Bronze Age burials have been discovered in the territory of Zarichchia.

It is mentioned on 4 March 1463 in the books of the Galician court. The village is mentioned in historical sources of the second half of the XVIII century.

Like all other Pokuttia villages, Zarzecze suffered from Tatar raids. In 1645-1650, the Delatyn land suffered from the war between the Bełżecki brothers.

=== The interwar period ===
In the interwar period, there was a consumer cooperative in Zarzecze nad Prutem, which was a branch of the Delatyn cooperative. At that time, this cooperative branch had its own mill in the village.

There was a wooden parish church in Zarzecze nad Prutem, which was built in 1909, but burned down in 1916. So from that time until the mid-30s of the 20th century, there was a theological chapel in the village, which was consecrated in 1922. At that time, there were four roadside chapels in Zarzecze nad Prutem. In the 1930s, Fr. wing Antonii Dmytrash, city dean, councilor of the Episcopal Consistory.

In the 1930s, a systematic 4-grade Utraquist school worked in Zarzecze nad Prutem.

=== Second World War ===
On 17 January 1940, Deliatyn Raion was separated from Nadwórna County, part of which was Zarzecze nad Prutem. On 13 November 1940, by decree of the Presidium of the Verkhovna Rada of the Ukrainian SSR, the Deliatyn Raion was liquidated, and the Zarichchia nad Prutem village council entered the Yaremcha Raion from its composition.

After the beginning of the occupation of the Republic of Poland in 1941, the rural gmina of Zarzecze nad Prutem was created, which consisted of the abolished gmina of Osławy Białe and parts of the (not abolished) gminas of Jaremcze (Łuh) and Pniów (Łojowa).

Starting in 1943, many Zarichchians joined the ranks of the Ukrainian Insurgent Army (UPA) to fight against both the Wehrmacht and the Red Army.

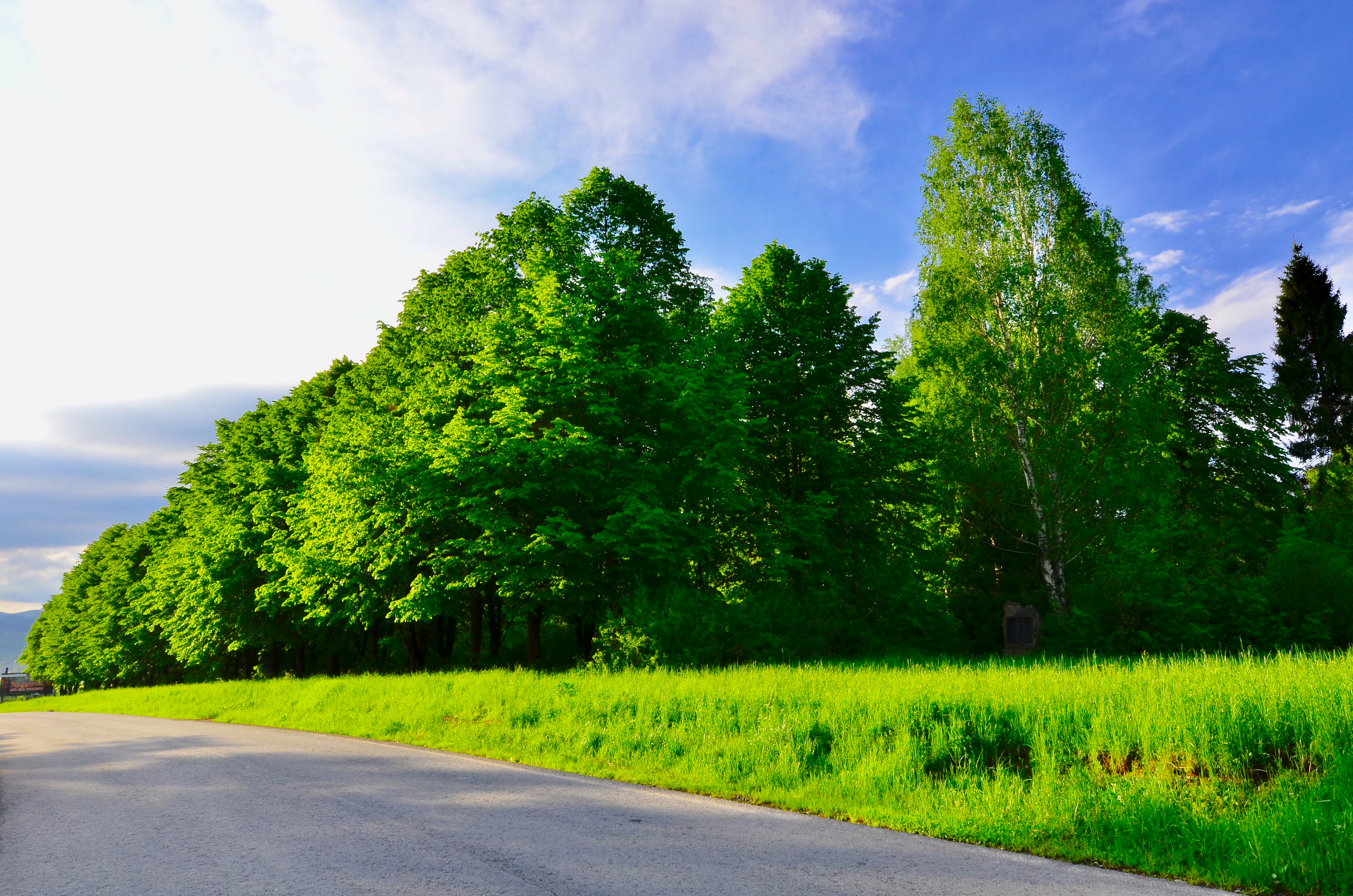
Park of Partisan Glory in Zarichchia

In August 1943, the remnants of Sydir Kovpak's partisan unit, after being defeated by the SS detachment in Deliatyn, passed through the Zarichchia in the direction of the village of Bili Oslavy. The apartment of the inhabitant of the village A. M. Kovalchuk housed the headquarters of the connection. A fierce battle broke out outside the village in the Dilok tract, in which Major General Semyon Rudnev, the union's commissioner, was killed. Residents of the village D. V. Vatsyk, M. Y. Kostytskyi, M. S. Humeniuk, I. Yu. Boicheniuk were the leaders of the Kovpakivtsi. During the passage of the front in the building of the village school was a hospital, here after a serious injury on 31 August 1944, died Hero of the Soviet Union, Lieutenant Vasiliy Gorshkov. On the outskirts of the village in the tract Dilok in honor of the 50th anniversary of Soviet rule and the 20th anniversary of the Carpathian raid Kovpak laid a Park of Partisan Glory.

On 17 February 1944, the criminal elements of the village killed the village foreman Mykhailo Stelmashchuk, who ran away for fear of punishment, and therefore on 28 February the Gestapo shot 24 innocent people.

=== Soviet Era ===
After World War II, the village was collectivized. The kolhosp (and then the radhosp) "Deliatinskyi" had 4,419 hectares of land, mills and a sawmill. The production direction was meat and dairy, there was also the cultivation of flax.

In 1962, due to the liquidation of the Yaremcha Raion, Zarichchia became part of the Bohorodchany Raion, but was transferred to the Nadvirna Raion.

=== Independent Ukraine ===
In the period from 1989, Zarichchians took an active part in the national revival that spread throughout Ukraine. In December 1989, a branch of the Ukrainian Language Society was established. The symbolic grave of the heroes of Ukraine was restored. The people of Zaricha poured it in the old place — on the "Grave" and consecrated it in May 1990. A lot of work was done to perpetuate the memory of the OUN-UPA.

In October 1992, a cross was erected and consecrated on the site of the Kernychky UPA base-village, and a commemorative sign dedicated to the 50th anniversary of the UPA was erected near the school. One of the streets of the village is named after Pavlo Vatsik (Major "Prut").

In 2000, a new school building was built, which was mainly financed by Anna-Liuba Yavorska, a citizen of Canada, a native of Zarichchia.

On 17 August 2017, Zarichchia together with Deliatyn and the villages of Chorni Oslavy and Chornyi Potik formed the Delyatyn settlement community.

On 21 January 2022, a sports facility was opened in Zarichchia with the participation of the Governor of Ivano-Frankivsk Oblast Svitlana Onyshchuk, the head of the Ivano-Frankivsk Oblast Council Oleksandr Sych, People's Deputy of Ukraine Vasyl Virastiuk, representatives of the community and the clergy.

==== Russo-Ukrainian War ====
After the start of the Russian invasion of Ukraine, on 28 April 2022, the executive committee of the Deliatyn settlement council decided to dismantle monuments-busts and memorial signs on the territory of the hromada, including the bust of Rudnev in Zarichchia. On 6 May 2022, the bust of Rudnev was dismantled near the building of the Zarichchia Starostyn district. Semyon Rudnev Street was also renamed to Stepan Bandera Street.

On 18 December 2022, in the area of the village of Klishchiivka, Bakhmut Raion, Donetsk Oblast, a fiance from Zarichchia Liubomyr Zhovnirovych died. The funeral took place on Christmas — 25 December symbolically, after the burial, two rainbows appeared in the sky at once, interrupting the light rain.

== Culture ==
The village has a lyceum named after Volodymyr Yavorskyi, a post office, a first-aid post, a house of culture, and a library. The village is fully gasified, there is street lighting. The Orthodox Church of Ukraine of the Holy Intercession, Father Mykhailo Kupchak, and the Greek Catholic Church, Father Mykhailo Smetaniuk, are registered in the village.

== Demographics ==
As of 1 January 1939, the village had 3,920 inhabitants, including 3,790 Ukrainian Greek Catholics, 80 Poles, and 50 Jews.

According to the 2001 census, the population of Zarichchia was 3,997 people.

== Notable people ==
- Pavlo Vatsyk — UPA major.
- Mykhailo Hnatiuk — Ukrainian philologist, historian and theoretician of literature, literary critic, Doctor of Philology, Chairman of the International Association of French Studies.
- Mykhailo Kosylo — teacher, local historian, honored worker of education of Ukraine.
- Stepan Mochernyi — economist, teacher, doctor of economics, professor.
- Dmytro Yakymishchak — teacher, lawyer, ambassador.
