= Chornyi Potik, Khust Raion, Zakarpattia Oblast =

Village in Zakarpattia Oblast, Ukraine

Chornyi Potik Чорний Потік
- Village
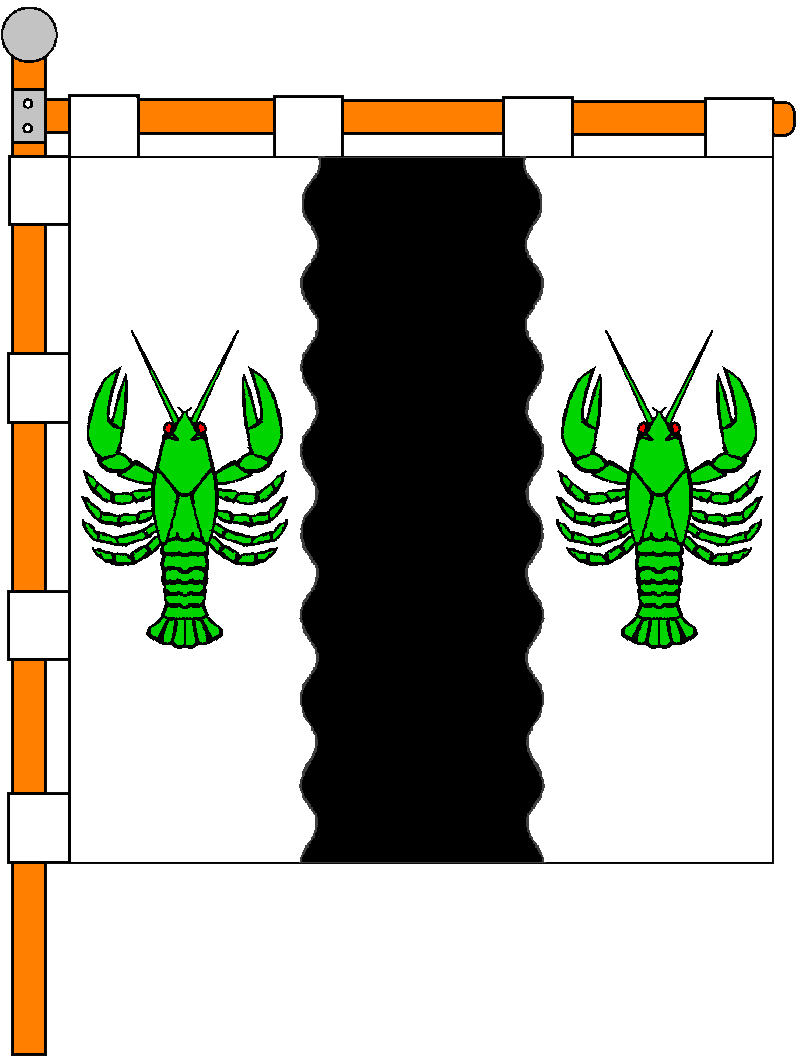
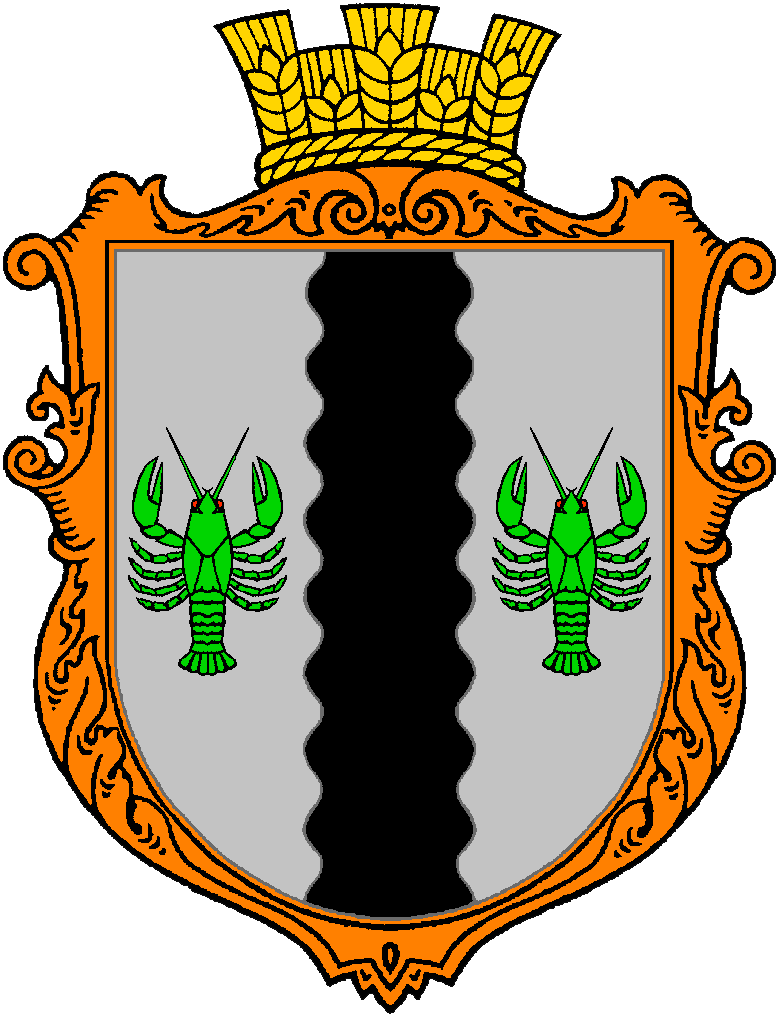
- Flag Coat of arms

- Location of Chornyi Potik Chornyi Potik (Ukraine)
- Coordinates: 48°24′29″N 22°59′52″E
- Country: Ukraine
- Oblast: Zakarpattia Oblast
- Raion: Khust Raion
- Hromada: Irshava urban hromada
- Founded: 1600
- Elevation: 385 m (1,263 ft)

Population (2001)
  - Total: 1,013
- Time zone: UTC+1 (CET)
  - Summer (DST): UTC+2 (CEST)
- Postal code: 90110
- Area code: +380 3144
- Climate: [

Chornyi Potik (Ukrainian: Чорний Потік) is a village located in Khust Raion, Zakarpattia Oblast (province) in western Ukraine. It forms part of Irshava urban hromada, one of the hromadas of Ukraine.

Until 18 July 2020, Chornyi Potik, was located in Irshava Raion. The raion was abolished that day and its territory was merged into Khust Raion as part of the administrative reform of Ukraine, which reduced the number of raions of Zakarpattia Oblast to six.

== Demographics ==
According to the 1989 census, the population of Chornyi Potik was 966, of which 470 were men and 496 were women. According to the 2001 census, 1013 people lived in the village.

=== Languages ===
Native language as of the Ukrainian Census of 2001:

Language	Percentage
Ukrainian	99.01 %
Russian	0.99 %
