= Lypivka =

Lypivka (Ukrainian: Липівка) may refer to the following places in Ukraine:

- Lypivka, Kyiv Oblast
- Lypivka, Ivano-Frankivsk Oblast
- Lypivka, Bakhmut Raion, Donetsk Oblast
- Lypivka, Lviv Oblast
- Lypivka, Chernihiv Oblast
