= Deliatyn settlement hromada =

Settlement hromada in Ivano-Frankivsk Oblast, Ukraine

Deliatyn settlement hromada Делятинська селищна громада
- Hromada
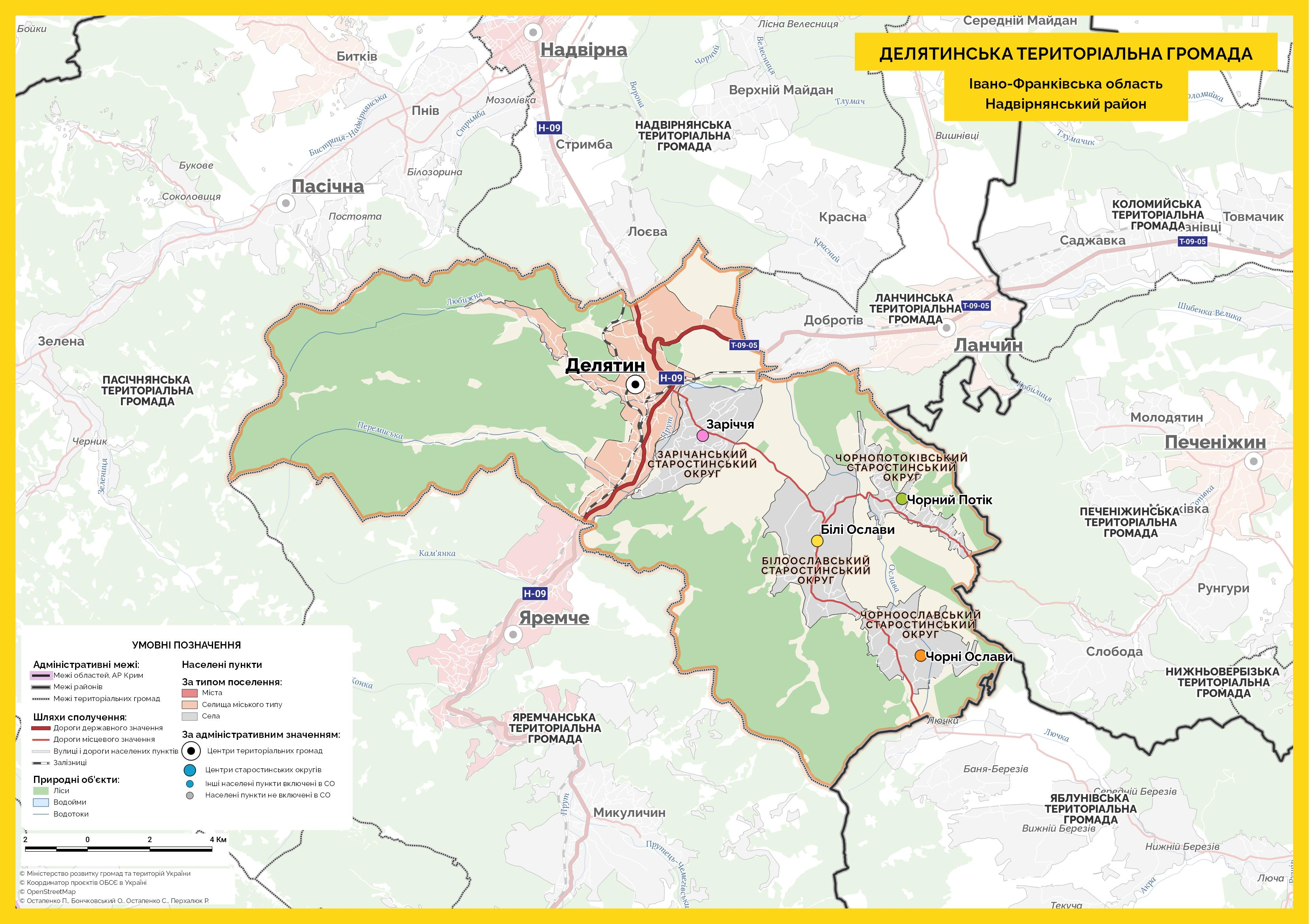
- Map of Deliatyn settlement hromada

- Location within Ivano-Frankivsk Oblast Location within Ukraine
- Coordinates: 48°31′43″N 24°37′25″E
- Country: Ukraine
- Oblast (province): Ivano-Frankivsk Oblast
- Raion (district): Nadvirna Raion
- Founded: 17 August 2017

Area
  - Total: 206.9 km^{2} (79.9 sq mi)

Population (2022)
  - Total: 21,187
- Website: delyatynska-gromada.gov.ua

Deliatyn settlement territorial hromada (Ukrainian: Деля́тинська се́лищна територіа́льна грома́да, romanized: Deliatynska selyshchna terytorialna hromada) is a hromada (municipality) in Ukraine, in Nadvirna Raion of Ivano-Frankivsk Oblast. The administrative center is the urban-type settlement of Deliatyn.

The area of the hromada is 206.9 square kilometres (79.9 mi^{2}), and the population is 21,187 (2022 estimate)

It was formed on 17 August 2017 by merging the urban municipality of Deliatyn Settlement Council and the rural municipalities of Zarichchia, Chorni Oslavy, and Chornyi Potik of Nadvirna Raion.

== Settlements ==
The hromada consists of one urban-type settlement (Deliatyn) and four villages:

- Bili Oslavy
- Chorni Oslavy
- Chornyi Potik
- Zarichchia
