= Mariyka Pidhiryanka =

Ukrainian poet (1881–1963)

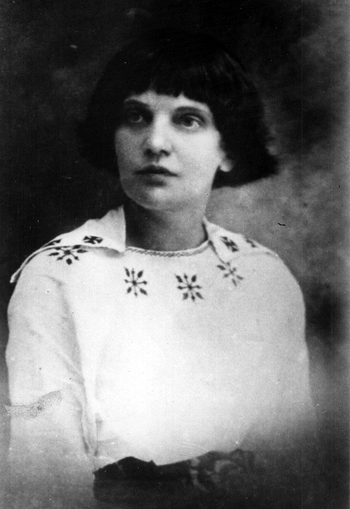
Portrait of Mariyka Pidhiryanka

Mariyka Pidhiryanka (Ukrainian: Марійка Підгірянка, 29 March, 1881 – May 20, 1963) was a Ukrainian poet, best remembered for her children's poetry though she also wrote adult work on patriotic themes.

== Life and work ==
Pidhiryanka was a pen-name, meaning "from under the mountains" and she was born Mariya Omelyanivna Lenert on 29 March 1881, in the village of Bili Oslavy near the town of Nadvirna on the edge of the Carpathian forest, in what was then Austrian Galicia. The landscape inspired her poem Верховина (Uplands):

Блакитне небо в головах,
А в ногах - ліси сині.
Орли мандрують в небесах,
Овечки - в полонині.

Translation:

My head is in a sky so blue,
But I stand true in woods on high.
Sheep now shelter where I grew,
Where eagles freely fly.

Her father was a forester with a large family, who decided that he could only afford to send his sons to school. Instead, she was taught to read and write and subsequently given a literary education by her grandfather, a Greek Catholic priest. She subsequently won a scholarship to a girls' secondary school and in 1900 gained a place at a teacher training academy in L'viv, the provincial capital of eastern Galicia.

The city was the leading centre of Ukrainian literary life and political activism, led by the poet Ivan Franko and his admirers. Unlike the Russian Empire, Austria allowed publication in the Ukrainian language and Pidhiryanka's first collection of poetry appeared in L'viv in 1908. By then she was married and officially Mariya Lenert-Dombrovs'ka.

During the First World War, with her husband conscripted into the Austro-Hungarian army, Pidhiryanka was evacuated with her children away from the Russian advance. Ukrainians were suspected of pro-Russian sympathies and the family was placed in civilian internment camps in Transcarpathia (then part of Hungary) and in Austria. She described the experience in her 1916 poem На чужині (In a strange land):

День розсвітає і минає,
Мов немає
Кружевом чорним тьма кружляє,
День спиває.

Translation:

Each day dawns and dies,
Without surprise,
Then in dark’s deep sighs,
Nightmare cries.

After Austria-Hungary collapsed, Pidhiryanka remained in exile across the Carpathians from war-torn Galicia, where the West Ukrainian People's Republic was defeated by the Poles, who then fought off the Bolsheviks and annexed the territory. Poland was much less tolerant than Austria of Ukrainian aspirations. Transcarpathia, however, passed from Hungary, which had banned education in minority languages, to the more liberal new state of Czechoslovakia.

Pidhiryanka organised schools to teach children in Ukrainian and became a prolific children's writer, with poems, plays and fables appearing in books, newspapers and magazines. Meanwhile, her poetry for adults, about her wartime experiences, found an audience among Ukrainian émigrés in North America, where it was published in Philadelphia in 1922.

In 1927, she lost her job as a result of a Czech government campaign against Ukrainian schools and the following year she returned to Galicia in search of work. In 1929 Pidhiryanka and her sister-in law took charge of the village school at Antonivka, near Tlumach. She is now remembered by a plaque on the school wall in Antonivka.

According to the memoirs of one of her pupils, Stefan Terlezki, the two women taught more than a hundred children between them. The main medium of instruction had to be Polish but teaching of the Ukrainian language and literature was permitted. Terlezki recalls how his teacher instilled her love of Ukrainian culture in her pupils. Pidhiryanka was in turn inspired by her noisy class to write Гомін (Chatter) in 1934:

Ходив гомін у літі
Стежечками пільними,
Дзвонив гомін у житі
Дзвіночками дрібними.

Дзвенів гомін в леліях,
Бринів гомін в струмочках,
І шуміла надія
В молоденьких листочках,
Що промовляться слова,
Проспіваються пісні
І сповняться мрії
Всі.

Все ж листки ті зотлілі
З вітром кануть та кануть,
Заспівають в могилі
Всю надію весняну…
Непромовлені слова,
Непроспівані пісні,
Несповнені мрії
Всі.

Translation:

Chattering voices sang
On summer pathways,
Chatter in rye rang
On bluebell bright days.

Chatter in the breeze,
Chatter in the trees,
Hope’s sound was found
In young leaves,
Words will resound
And songs be sung,
Dreams spun
Every one.

Where leaves are lost
In windblown frost,
In graveside prayers
When hope despairs…
No words resound,
No songs are sung,
No dreams spun
Not one.

In 1937, Pidhiryanka moved to the school in the neighbouring village of Bratishiv, where she taught until shortly after eastern Galicia was occupied by the Soviet Union in 1939. Her career was abruptly ended in the spring of 1940, when a horse bolted in the market in the small town of Nyzhniv. Pidhiryanka was trampled under its hooves and left bedridden. As a teacher, poet and Ukrainian patriot she would have been a likely target of the NKVD, both before the invasion by Nazi Germany in 1941 and during Joseph Stalin's post-war campaign against Ukrainian nationalism. However, her injuries had consigned her to obscurity and she was spared.

In 1957, Pidhiryanka went to live with one of her daughters, who taught in a village school near L'viv. Even her children's poetry was now only published in the Ukrainian diaspora in North America. However, as Nikita Khrushchev slightly relaxed the political climate, some of her poems began to appear in children's magazines in Ukraine.

In 1960 she was admitted to membership of the writers' union of the Ukrainian Soviet Socialist Republic. This official recognition encouraged her to write one of her final poems Плине життя (Life flows):

Плине життя і плине
мов по воді.
Відпливли вже від мене
дні молоді.
Коли я в ніч темнісеньку
у сяйві мрій
Співала першу пісеньку
Землі своїй.
....
Світельця розсій в ранній
Райдузі снів
На дні мої останні
Й останній спів.

Translation:

Life flows –onward it flows
Then ebbs away
Like water my life goes
Far from youth’s day.
I’ll hear in dark of night
My song’s first verse
Bright dreams that still delight
Brought back to earth.
....
My world will soon disperse
In sleep’s rainbow
I’ll sing my final verse
And then I’ll go.

Her official status allowed the publication in L'viv of a collection of her children's poetry, shortly before her death at the age of 82 on 20 May 1963 but republication of her adult work had to wait for Mikhail Gorbachev and glasnost. A forestry industry newspaper published one of her first World War poems in 1989 and it was then reprinted in local newspapers serving Nizhniv and Nadvirna. After Ukrainian independence Pidhiryanka was included in a collection of Transcarpathian poetry and her children's work remains popular in 21st century Ukraine.
