= Chornyi Potik, Ivano-Frankivsk Oblast =

Village in Ivano-Frankivsk Oblast, Ukraine

Chornyi Potik Чорний Потік
- Village
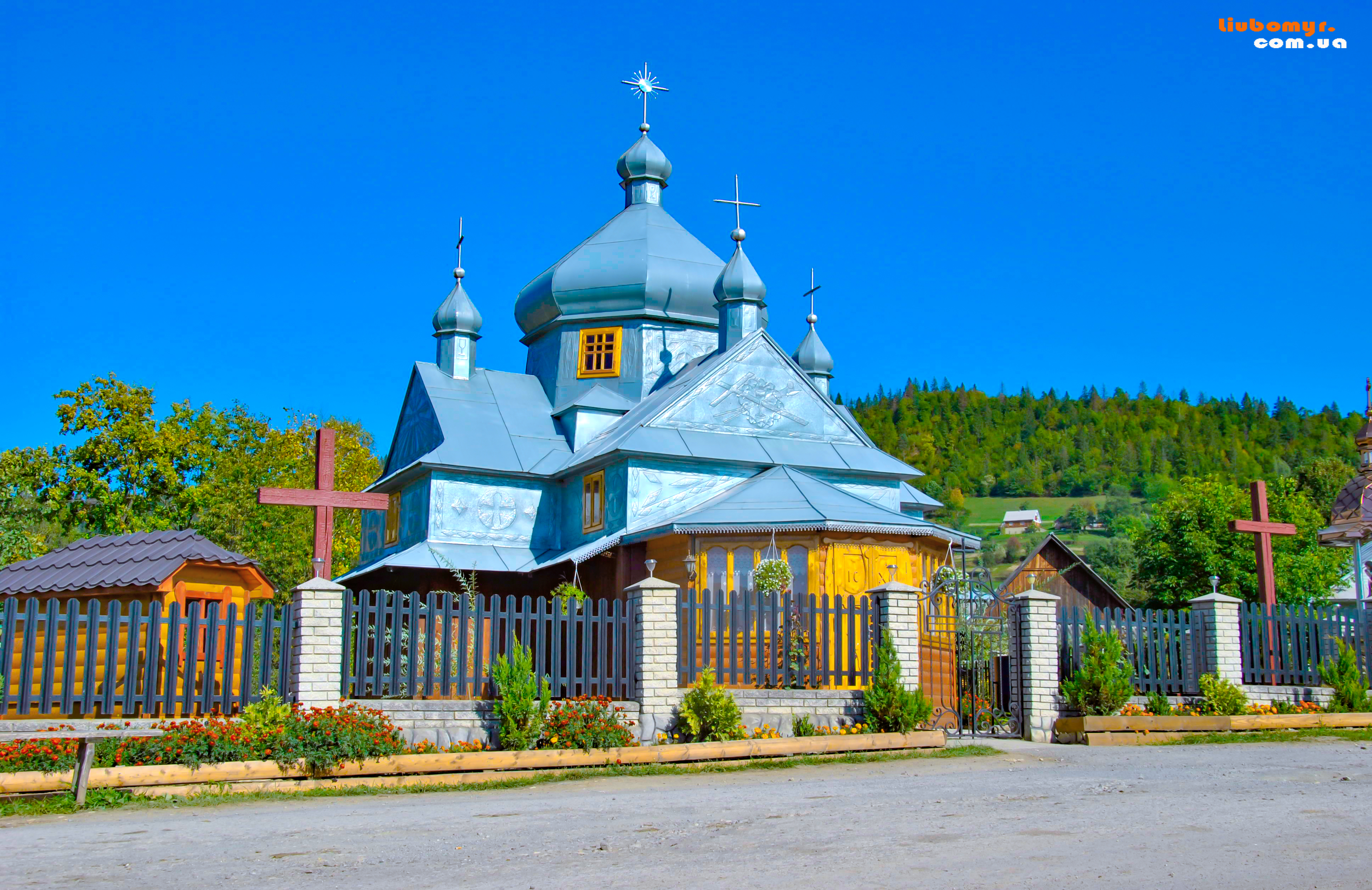

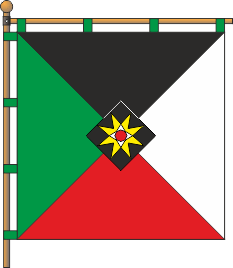
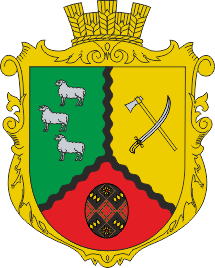
- Flag Coat of arms

- Location of Chornyi Potik Chornyi Potik (Ukraine)
- Coordinates: 48°30′22″N 24°43′35″E
- Country: Ukraine
- Oblast (province): Ivano-Frankivsk Oblast
- Raion (district): Nadvirna Raion
- Hromada: Deliatyn settlement hromada
- Elevation: 477 m (1,565 ft)

Population (2021)
  - Total: 2,996
- Time zone: UTC+1 (CET)
  - Summer (DST): UTC+2 (CEST)
- Postal code: 78461
- Area code: +380 3475

Chornyi Potik (Ukrainian: Чорний Потік; Polish: Potok Czarny), is an urban-type settlement in Nadvirna Raion (district) of Ivano-Frankivsk Oblast (region) of Ukraine. It forms part of Deliatyn settlement hromada, one of the hromadas of Ukraine.

== Demographics ==
=== Languages ===
Native language as of the Ukrainian Census of 2001:

Language	Percentage
Ukrainian	99.93 %
Other	0.07 %
