= Nadvirna Raion =

Subdivision of Ivano-Frankivsk Oblast, Ukraine

Nadvirna Raion Надвірнянський район
- Raion
- Nadvirnianskyi raion
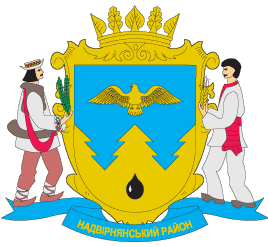
- Flag Coat of arms

- Coordinates: 48°33′13″N 24°30′16″E
- Country: Ukraine
- Oblast: Ivano-Frankivsk Oblast
- Admin. center: Nadvirna
- Subdivisions: 8 hromadas

Area
  - Total: 1,870 km^{2} (720 sq mi)

Population (2022)
  - Total: 129,928
  - Density: 69.5/km^{2} (180/sq mi)
- Time zone: UTC+02:00 (EET)
  - Summer (DST): UTC+03:00 (EEST)
- Area code: +380

Nadvirna Raion (Ukrainian: Надвірнянський район, romanized: Nadvirn'ans'kyj rajon) is a raion (district) of Ivano-Frankivsk Oblast (region). The town of Nadvirna is the administrative center of the raion. Population: 129,328 (2022 estimate).

On 18 July 2020, as part of the administrative reform of Ukraine, the number of raions of Ivano-Frankivsk Oblast was reduced to six, and the area of Nadvirna Raion was significantly expanded. Yaremche Municipality was merged into Nadvirna Raion. The January 2020 estimate of the raion population was 114,625 (2020 est.).

In 2015 oil production stopped in the raion (due to the license expiration).

== Subdivisions ==
=== Current ===
After the reform in July 2020, the raion consisted of 8 hromadas:

- Deliatyn settlement hromada with the administration in the rural settlement of Deliatyn, retained from Nadvirna Raion;
- Lanchyn settlement hromada with the administration in the rural settlement of Lanchyn, retained from Nadvirna Raion;
- Nadvirna urban hromada with the administration in the city of Nadvirna, retained from Nadvirna Raion;
- Pasichna rural hromada with the administration in the selo of Pasichna, retained from Nadvirna Raion;
- Pererisl rural hromada with the administration in the selo of Pererisl, retained from Nadvirna Raion.
- Polianytsia rural hromada with the administration in the selo of Polianytsia, transferred from Yaremche Municipality;
- Vorokhta settlement hromada with the administration in the rural settlement of Vorokhta, transferred from Yaremche Municipality;
- Yaremche urban hromada with the administration in the city of Yaremche, transferred from Yaremche Municipality.

=== Before 2020 ===
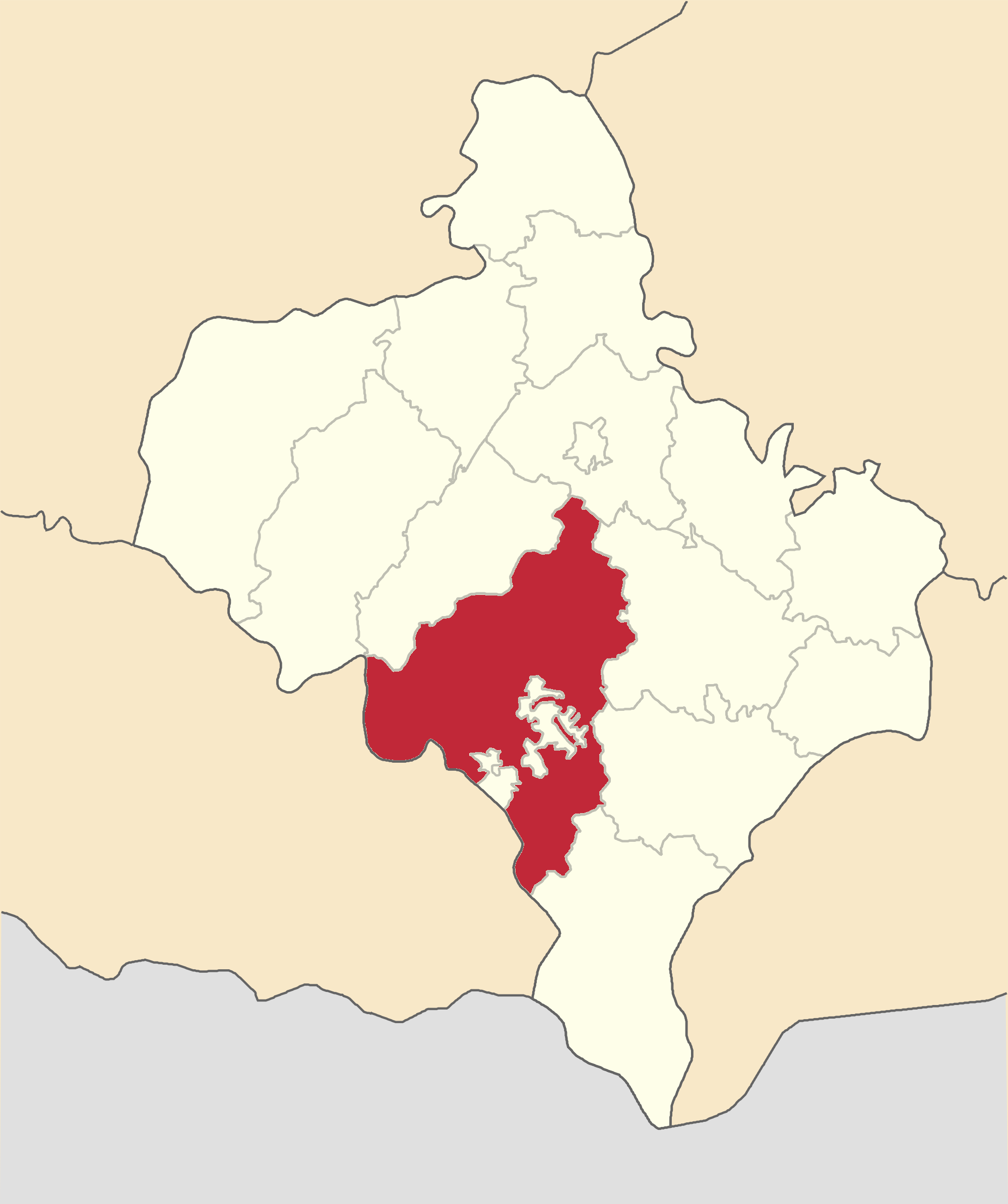
Nadvirna Raion in Ivano-Frankivsk Oblast (1966-2020)

Before the 2020 reform, the raion consisted of five hromadas:

- Deliatyn settlement hromada with the administration in Deliatyn;
- Lanchyn settlement hromada with the administration in Lanchyn;
- Nadvirna urban hromada with the administration in Nadvirna;
- Pasichna rural hromada with the administration in Pasichna;
- Pererisl rural hromada with the administration in Pererisl.

== People ==
- Mariyka Pidhiryanka, a Ukrainian poet, best remembered for her children's poetry
- Bohdan Beniuk, a Ukrainian actor of theater and cinema, politician, People's Artist of Ukraine
