= Bohorodchany Raion =

Former subdivision of Ivano-Frankivsk Oblast, Ukraine

Bohorodchany Raion Богородчанський район
- Raion
- Bohorodchanskyi raion
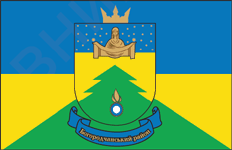
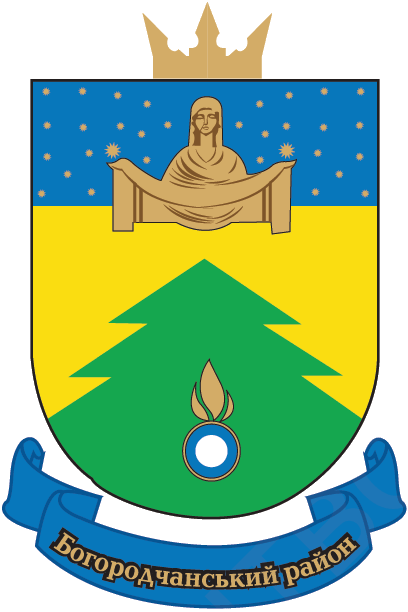
- Flag Coat of arms

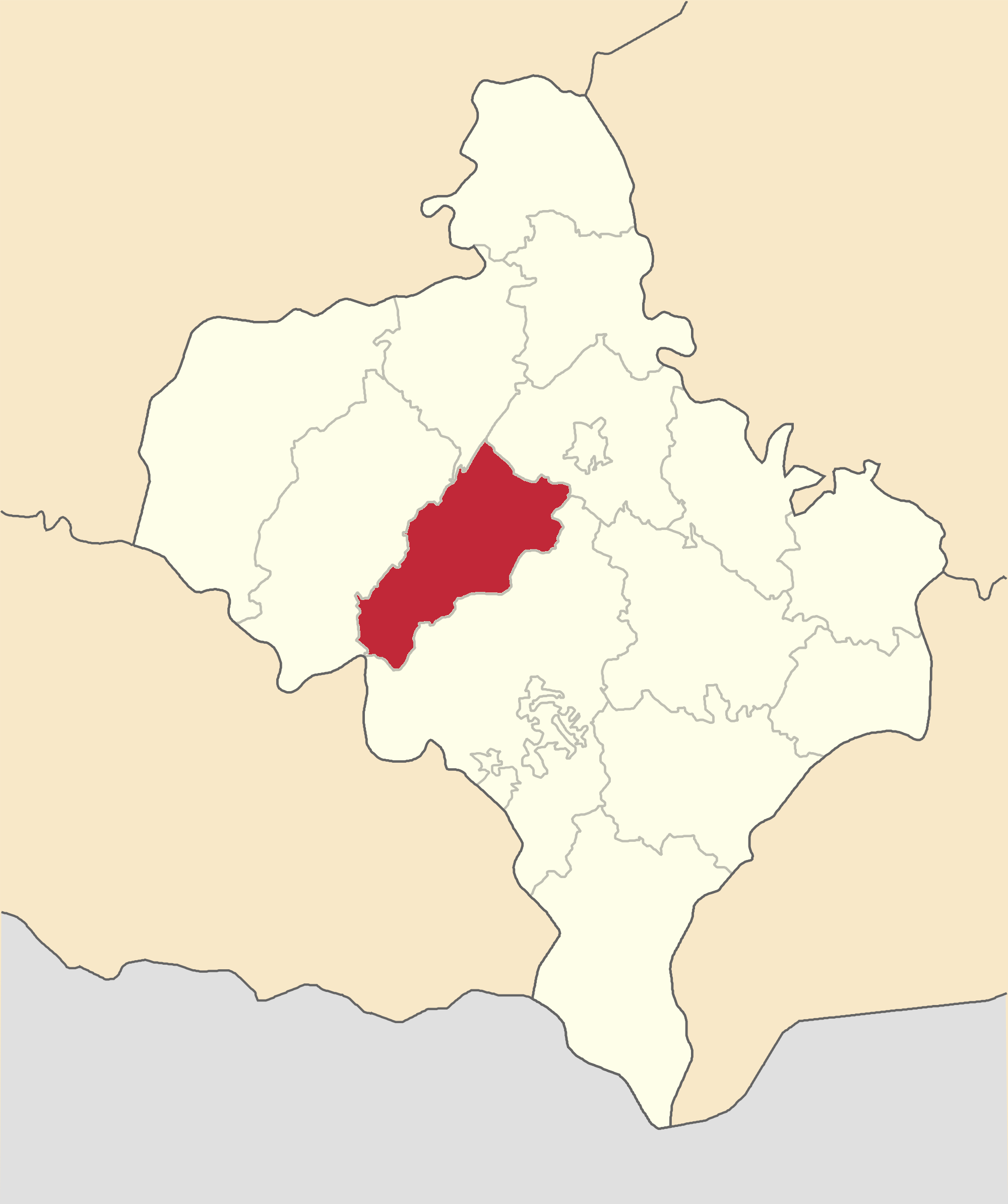
- Coordinates: 48°43′23″N 24°22′47″E
- Country: Ukraine
- Region: Ivano-Frankivsk Oblast
- Established: January 1, 1947 (1940, originally)
- Disestablished: 18 July 2020
- Admin. center: Bohorodchany
- Subdivisions: List: 0 — city councils; 2 — settlement councils; 30 — rural councils; Number of localities: 0 — cities; 2 — urban-type settlements; 39 — villages; — rural settlements

Government
  - Governor: Lilia Kontsur

Area
  - Total: 799 km^{2} (308 sq mi)

Population (2020)
  - Total: 68,952
  - Density: 86.3/km^{2} (224/sq mi)
- Time zone: UTC+2 (EET)
  - Summer (DST): UTC+3 (EEST)
- Postal index: 77700
- Area code: 380-3471
- Website: Raion profile Official website

Bohorodchany raion (Ukrainian: Богородча́нський райо́н, romanized: Bohorodčanśkyj rajon) was a district (raion) of the Ivano-Frankivsk Oblast in Ukraine. The urban-type settlement of Bohorodchany was the administrative center of the district. The raion was vaguely reminiscent with the Bohorodczan Powiat of the Stanisławów Voivodeship (1920 - 1932). The raion was abolished on 18 July 2020 as part of the administrative reform of Ukraine, which reduced the number of raions of Ivano-Frankivsk Oblast Oblast to six. The area of Bohorodchany Raion was merged into Ivano-Frankivsk Raion. The last estimate of the raion population was 68,952 (2020 est.).

== Geography ==
The district was located in the south-western part of the Ivano-Frankivsk Region (also known as Prykarpattia) stretching from its center towards peaks of the Carpathian Mountains that serve as a natural border between Prykarpattia and Zakarpattia. To the west of the district was located the Rozhniativ district, to the north - Kalush, north-east - Tysmenytsia, south-east - Nadvirna. The Bohorodchany district also had a small border with the Zakarpattia Region.

The physical geography of the district was not the same and was divided into three landscape zones: plains, piedmont (foothills), mountains. The highest peak was the mountain Syvulia 1,836.6 m (6,026 ft) which was located on the border of Bohorodchany and Rozhniativ districts and is part of Gorgany mountainous system. Two major rivers that flow through the area are Bystrytsias of Solotvyn and Nadvirna.

| Nature protected areas | Municipality |
|---|---|
| Skete of Manyava Botanic Reserve | Manyava |
| Manayva Waterfall, Landmark of Nature | Manyava |

The total area of forests in the district was 413 km^{2} (159 sq mi) which was over 50% of the district's territory. In the middle of the Carpathian Gorgany was located a botanic reserve "Skete of Manyava" known as a local arboretum which contains selection of Larix decidua. Near the reserve is located over 20 m (66 ft) tall waterfall, a local Landmark of Nature. Near the village of Starunya is located a unique mud volcano.

== Administrative divisions ==
At the time of disestablishment, the raion consisted of four hromadas:

- Bohorodchany settlement hromada with the administration in Bohorodchany;
- Dzvyniach rural hromada with the administration in the selo of Dzvyniach;
- Solotvyn settlement hromada with the administration in the urban-type settlement of Solotvyn;
- Stari Bohorodchany rural hromada with the administration in the selo of Stari Bohorodchany.

The raion was divided into 32 municipalities: two - urban, 30 - rural. Within the district were located 41 settlements and no cities. All municipalities are named after their administrative centers and may include other settlements within their territories.

Largest settlements in the region
| # | Settlement | Population |
| 1 | Bohorodchany | 7,464 (2001) |
| 2 | Solotvyn | 3,867 (2001) |
| 3 | S.Bohorodchany | 3,569 (2001) |
| 4 | Maniava | 3,491 (2001) |
| 5 | Rosilna | 3,212 (2001) |

| Municipality | Population | Area km^{2} | Type | Number of settlements | Water resources (if available) |
|---|---|---|---|---|---|
| Bohorodchany | 7,464 | 12 | urban | 1 | Bystrytsia of Solotvyn |
| Solotvyn | 3,867 | 19 | urban | 1 | Bystrytsia of Solotvyn |
| Babche | 2,484 | 17 | rural | 1 | |
| Bohrivka | 860 | 8 | rural | 1 | |
| Dzvynyach | 2,468 | 13 | rural | 1 | |
| Hlybivka | 1,129 | 14 | rural | 1 | Sadzhavka |
| Hlyboka | 1,512 | 37 | rural | 1 | |
| Hrokholyna | 3,077 | 36 | rural | 2 | |
| Hrabovets | 1,325 | 22 | rural | 2 | Bystrytsia of Nadvirna |
| Huta | 1,064 | 15 | rural | 2 | Bystrytsia of Solotvyn |
| Ivanykivka | 2,345 | 19 | rural | 1 | |
| Khmelivka | 709 | 16 | rural | 1 | |
| Kosmach | 1,517 | 17 | rural | 1 | |
| Kryvets | 1,817 | 15 | rural | 1 | |
| Krychka | 1,795 | 17 | rural | 1 | |
| Lukvytsia | 841 | 11 | rural | 1 | Lukva |
| Maniava | 3,538 | 44 | rural | 2 | |
| Markova | 3.010 | 14 | rural | 1 | Manyavka |
| Mizhhiria | 652 | 88 | rural | 1 | Lukva |
| Monastyrchany | 1,548 | 30 | rural | 1 | Bystrytsia of Solotvyn; Manyavka |
| Novochyn | 1,812 | 53 | rural | 3 | Novochynka |
| Pidhir'ya | 2,529 | 33 | rural | 2 | Bystrytsia of Solotvyn |
| Porohy | 3,126 | 34 | rural | 1 | Bystrytsia of Solotvyn |
| Pokhivka | 497 | 10 | rural | 1 | |
| Rakovets | 1,934 | 8 | rural | 1 | Bystrytsia of Solotvyn |
| Rosilna | 3,212 | 33 | rural | 1 | Sadzhavka |
| Sadzhava | 1,825 | 18 | rural | 1 | Sadzhavka |
| Stari Bohorodchany | 4,336 | 38 | rural | 2 | Bystrytsia of Solotvyn; Sadzhavka |
| Starunia | 3,239 | 22 | rural | 2 | Lukavets |
| Yablunka | 1,906 | 25 | rural | 1 | Bystrytsia of Solotvyn |
| Zaberezhia | 871 | 9 | rural | 1 | Bystrytsia of Nadvirna |
| Zhuraky | 1,903 | 18 | rural | 1 | Bystrytsia of Solotvyn |
| Average | 2,194 | 25 | rural | 1.28 | Bystrytsia of Solotvyn |

== Government ==
The government in the district was headed by the chairman of the district state administration (governor) appointed by the President of Ukraine. The governor appointed his deputies forming his regional governing cabinet to supervise the government policies in the region. Aside of the state administration the region had its own council that is headed by its chairman. The composition of the council depends on the popular vote in the region, while the chairman is elected within the elected council.

Regional State Administration

The District State Administration (BRDA) consisted of the chairman, his deputies (3), and secretary who headed the supporting "aparat" of the administration. Within the administration were numerous departments, each of them headed by a chief of department. The Bohorodchany District State Administration had 13 departments and other government institutions such as the Children Service, regional state archives, and others.

- Chairman: Volodymyr Yefimchuk (Party of Regions)

District council

Seats and percentage
| Svoboda (13) | 20.97% |
| Our Ukraine (11) | 17.74% |
| Front of Changes (8) | 12.90% |
| Fatherland (7) | 11.29% |
| Party of Regions (7) | 11.29% |
| Revival (7) | 11.29% |
| For Ukraine! (3) | 4.84% |
| RUKh (2) | 3.23% |
| Cathedral (1) | 1.61% |
| People's Party (1) | 1.61% |
| Ukrainian People's Party (1) | 1.61% |
| European Party (1) | 1.61% |

- Chairman: Mykhailo Holovchuk (Svoboda)

== Transportation ==
The districts infrastructure was poorly developed, however there were several highway routes passing through it.

Main Highways

- H09 traveling from Ivano-Frankivsk to Nadvirna the highway passes through the town of Bohorodchany heading further to Yaremche.
- P38, an exclusive highway that is completely within the district and runs from Bohorodchany to the village of Stara Huta in Carpathians.
- T0902, a regional route Rozhniativ-Kosmach-Nadvirna that connects the district with its neighbors.

== Mass media ==
There is a district newspaper "Voice of People" (Slovo Narodu) and one radio station "Source" (Dzherelo).

== Tourist attractions ==
Museum Fund

- Historic-Regional Museum of Fedanyk (Solotvyn)
- History Museum of the Forest Factory (Dzvynyach)
- Museum of ethnography and traditions of the village (Sadzhava)
- Museum of Nature (Manyava)
- Historic-Architecture Museum (Maniava Monastery-Skete)

Government Protected areas

- National Landmark of Architecture (1690) Monastery-Skete Complex, Manyava, Protection# 239 (included Over-gate Tower 239/1, Treasury 239/2, Defense Tower and walls 239/3, Refectory 239/4, Foundations of Zdvyzhenska Church 239/5)
- National Landmark of Architecture (1832, wooden) Church of Nativity of Jesus, Pidhir'ya, Protection# 1141 (includes Church 1141/1 and its belfry 1141/2)
- National Landmark of Archeology "Multi-layers Settlement Starunia-1" (Bronze Age, Neolithic)
- National Landmark of Architecture (1762) Dominican Monastery Complex, Bohorodchany, Protection# 234 (included Kosciol 234/1, Chamber-cells of Clergy 234/2, Wall with a gate 234/3)

Local Landmarks

There are 15 archeological sites near the village of Starunia that identified as local Landmarks, three more sites are near the village of Hrabovets. There are also archeological landmarks near the villages of Horokholyna, Manyava, and Molodkiv.

- Local Landmark of Nature "Manyava waterfall"
- Botanic Reserve "Skete of Manyava"
- Building of People's Court, 20th century (Bohorodchany) Protection# 606
- Synagogue, 18th century (Solotvyn) Protection# 631
- Church of Nativity of the Theotokos, 1904 wooden (Solotvyn) Protection# 632 and its belfry (Protection# 633)
- Church of Saint Taxiarch Archangel Michael, 1805 wooden (Babche) Protection# 607
- Church of Nativity of the Theotokos, 1810 wooden (Bohrivka) Protection# 608 and its belfry (Protection# 609)
- Church of Saint Nicolas, 1875 wooden (Hlybivka) Protection# 610
- Church of Resurrection of Christ, 1856 wooden (Hrabovets) Protection# 611
- Church of Lord's Levitation, 1860 wooden (Hrynivka) Protection# 612
- Church of Saint Demetrius, 1868 wooden (Kosmach) Protection# 614/1 and its belfry (Protection# 614/2)
- Watermill, 19th century wooden (Kosmach) Protection# 615
- Smith shop, 1896 wooden (Kosmach) Protection# 616
- Church of Saint Taxiarch Archangel Michael, 1862 wooden (Kryvets) Protection# 619
- Church of Saint Paraskevi of Serbia, 1820 wooden (Krychka) Protection# 617 and its belfry (Protection# 618)
- Church of Saint Apostles Paul and Peter, 1862 wooden (Lesivka) Protection# 620
- Church of Immaculate Conception of Virgin Mary, 1775 wooden (Lukvytsia) Protection# 521
- Church of Protection of the Theotokos, 1819 wooden (Manyava) Protection# 622
- Church of Saint John the Baptist, 1846 wooden (Markova) Protection# 623
- Church of Saint Nicolas, 19th century wooden (Pidhir'ya) Protection# 624
- Church of Saint Taxiarch Archangel Michael, 1848 wooden (Rosilna) Protection# 625 and its belfry (Protection# 626)
- Mine well, 16th century (Rosilna) Protection# 627
- Church of Saint Taxiarch Archangel Michael (at cemetery), 1776 wooden (Rosilna) Protection# 628
- Church of Nativity of the Theotokos, 1863 wooden (Stari Bohorodchany) Protection# 629
- Church of Resurrection of Christ, 1926 wooden (Stari Bohorodchany) Protection# 630

== Personalities ==
- Mykhailo Petrushevych (1869–1895), a Ukrainian writer
- Oleksiy Zaklynsky (1819–1881), a Ukrainian writer
- Ivan Kapushchak (1807–1868), a deputy to the Austrian Imperial Parliament
- Modest Sosenko (1875–1920), a Ukrainian artist
- Mykhailo Yatskiv (1873–1961), a Ukrainian writer
- Mykhailo Martynets, a minister of Land Affairs for the government of the West Ukrainian People's Republic

Writers who commemorated their work to the region

- Antin Mohylnytsky (1811–1873), a Ukrainian poet, a Greek-Catholic priest
- Yulian Tselvych (1843–1892), a Ukrainian historian and pedagogue
