= Nadwórna County =

Nadwórna County Powiat nadwórniański
- Powiat
- Coat of arms

- Country: Second Polish Republic
- Voivodeship: Stanisławów
- Seat: Nadwórna

Area
  - Total: 2,472 km^{2} (954 sq mi)

Population (1931)
  - Total: 140,700
  - Density: 57/km^{2} (150/sq mi)

Nadwórna County (Polish: Powiat nadwórniański; Ukrainian: Надвірнянський повіт) was a former Polish county (Powiat) in the Stanisławów Voivodeship in Southeastern Poland.

The county existed between 1921 and 1939, as a direct successor of the Austrian Nadwórna District (German: Bezirk Nadwórna).

== History ==
With the proclamation of the West Ukrainian People's Republic on 1 November 1918, the territory of the Austrian Nadwórna District fell under Ukrainian administration, with Ivan Syanotskyi being appointed district commissioner. Polish troops entered Nadwórna between May 20 and 25 1919; By November 1919 Entente Powers acknowledged Poland's claim to Galicia. During the Polish-Bolshevik War in 1920, Petlura's forces killed 6 Jews in Nadwórna and wounded many more. In postwar years, due to persecution and an epidemic, the number of Jews in the county drastically decreased.

On 1 April 1923 the Bitków municipality (gmina) was transferred into the Nadwórna County from the neighbouring Bohorodczany County, out of which also the Mołotków municipality was transferred to Nadwórna County on 1 July 1925.

On 1 January 1926 the municipality of Święty Józef was transferred from Nadwórna County to Kołomyja County.

On 1 April 1932, the neighbouring Bohorodczany County was liquidated, out of which the following municipalities (gminas) were annexed into Nadwórna County: Bogrówka, Dźwiniacz, Grabowiec, Jabłonka, Kosmacz, Kryczka, Krzywiec, Majdan, Manasterczany, Maniawa, Markowa, Porohy, Przysłup, Rabcze, Rakowiec, Rosulna, Sołotwina, Starunia, Zarzecze and Żuraki. The remainder of the Bohorodczany County was annexed into the Stanisławów County.

In 1938 many local Jews left Nadwórna County, fearing an impending war.

On 15 June 1939, Alois Sornik, a German citizen was murdered in Zielona in Nadwórna County under unclear circumstances. German propaganda would later portray Sornik's death as a political assassination.
The Bad Schandau-based German newspaper Sächsische Elbzeitung would later report on the incident, stating that Sornik was walking from the boarding school in Zielona to the Greek Catholic rectory where he lived, when two men, later identified as forester Wrobel and forest worker Onufrek, knocked Sornik to the ground before beating him. Sornik was taken to the hospital in Nadwórna in the car of a tourist, succumbing to his injures four days later. Sornik's body was later transferred to Ansbach in Bavaria where his parents lived. His two perpetrators were arrested by the public prosecutor's office in Stanisławów.
The newspaper put forth the idea that Sornik's murder was in connection to his brother's political role representing the German minority in Silesia. Sornik's funeral in Ansbach was ceremonially attended by the NSDAP.

=== World War II ===
On 20 September 1939, following the outbreak of the Second World War, Soviet troops entered Nadwórna, the county's capital. As Polish authorities had fled the city, local Jews organised self-defense units to patrol the city's streets, partaking in the defense of Jewish property against plundering by Ukrainian peasants in the village of Sołotwina.

Delatyn, through which Polish authorities fled en route to Romania, was similarly captured by Soviet forces in late September.

On November 27, 1939, Nadwórna county was officially incorporated into the Soviet Union's newly formed Stanislav Oblast; On 17 January 1940 it was recorganised into the Nadvirna Raion.

During German-occupation the territory of the former county was incorporated into the General Government on 1 August 1941, constituting a part of the Stanislau District (German: Kreishauptmannschaft Stanislau) of the District of Galicia.

== Administrative division ==
From 1934 to 1939 the Nadwórna County was constituted by 14 "rural municipalities" (Polish: Gminy wiejskie), and two cities — Nadwórna and Delatyn, as per the regulation of the Minister of Internal Affairs from July 21 1934 on the administrative division of the county.

Municipalities of Nadwórna County:

Coat of arms	Municipality	Type	Population	Area
	Nadwórna	City	10,488	29,42 km²
	Delatyn	City	8,815	51,41 km²
	Jabłonica	Rural Municipality	2,203	105,68 km²
	Jaremcze	Rural Municipality	5,536	148,92 km²
	Łanczyn	Rural Municipality	11,857	94,22 km²
	Majdan Średni	Rural Municipality	10,837	145,81 km²
	Mikuliczyn	Rural Municipality	4,570	171,23 km²
	Osławy Białe	Rural Municipality	10,639	112,62 km²
	Pniów	Rural Municipality	11,880	115,76 km²
	Porohy	Rural Municipality	7,031	246,08 km²
	Przerośl	Rural Municipality	10,342	110,22 km²
	Rosulna	Rural Municipality	7,743	102,75 km²
	Sołotwina	Rural Municipality	14,785	128,64 km²
	Starunia	Rural Municipality	11,308	90,08 km²
	Worochta	Rural Municipality	3,540	261,64 km²
	Zielona	Rural Municipality	8,760	557,87 km²
