= Church of the Resurrection, Poliany =

Church in Lviv Oblast, Ukraine

Church of the Resurrection Церква Воскресіння Христового
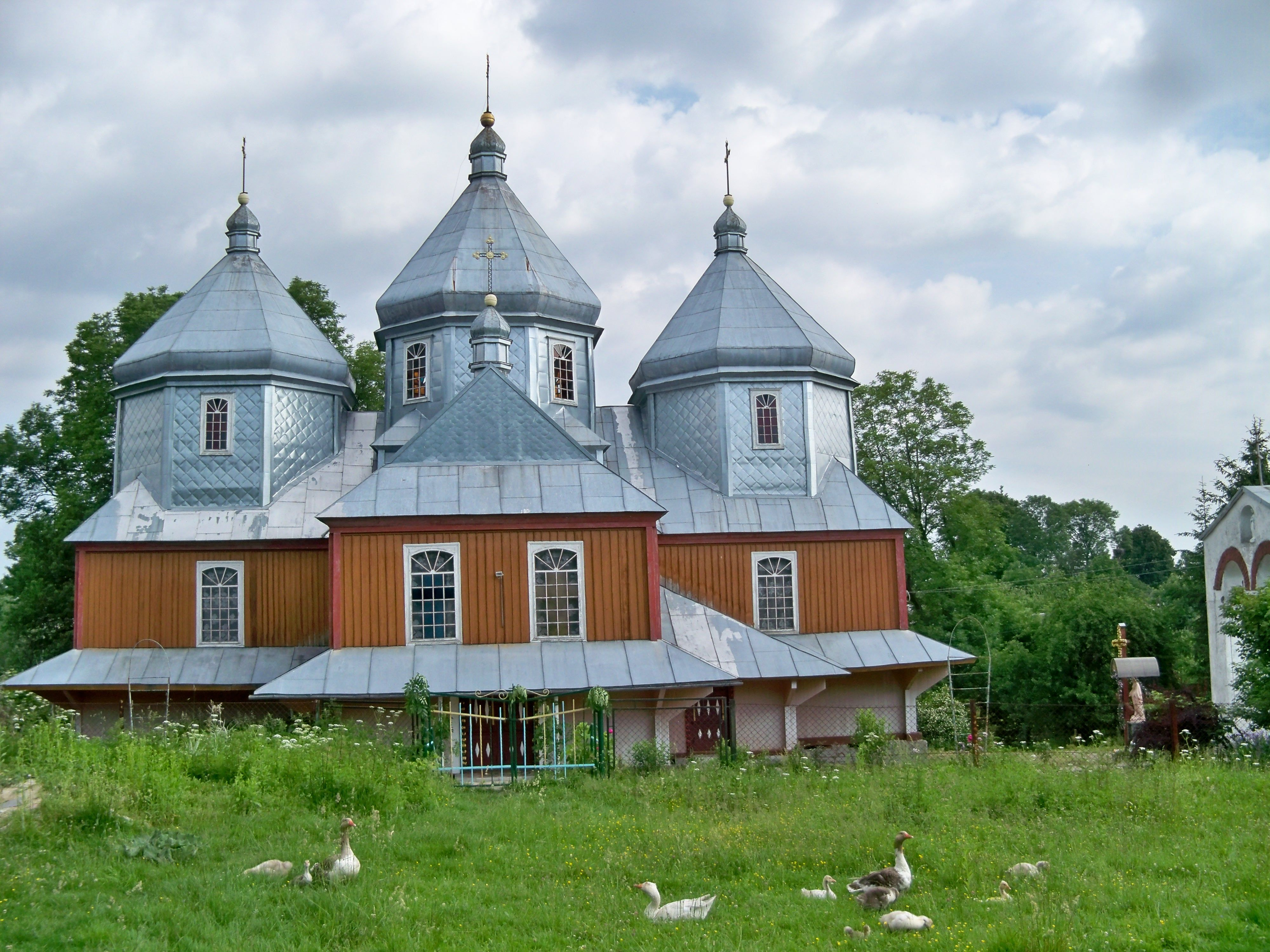

- Location within Lviv Oblast

Religion
- Affiliation: Orthodox Church of Ukraine

Location
- Location: Poliany, Pomoriany settlement hromada, Zolochiv Raion, Lviv Oblast, Ukraine
- Coordinates: 49°44′26″N 24°59′06″E

Architecture
- Completed: 1903

Church of the Resurrection (Ukrainian: Церква Воскресіння Христового) is an Orthodox parish church (OCU) in Poliany of the Pomoriany settlement hromada, Zolochiv Raion, Lviv Oblast. An architectural monument of local importance. It is the only wooden church with paintings by Modest Sosenko.

== History ==
In 1903, a wooden church was built by architect Vasyl Nahirnyi on the site of an ancient wooden church built in 1675.

In 1911–1913, the church was painted by the artist Modest Sosenko together with Iryna Shukhevych and Yulian Butsmaniuk.

In 1927 the bell tower was built.

Number of parishioners: 1832 – 389, 1844 – 421, 1854 – 580, 1864 – 629, 1874 – 655, 1884 – 721, 1894 – 836, 1904 – 965, 1914 – 1.084, 1924 – 982, 1936 – 932.

== Priests ==
- at. Sylvester Bohaievskyi ([1832]–1836, administrator),
- at. unknown (1836–1848)
- at. Ivan Rudnytskyi (1848–1868+),
- at. Narkyzii Yankevych (1868–1884),
- at. Teofil Petrovskyi (1884–1886, administrator; 1886-1922+),
- at. Teodor Bula (1917–[1918], administrator),
- at. Andrii Khlystun (1922–1924),
- at. Mykola Rytsar (1924–1942+),
- at. Vasyl Kvit (1942–[1944]),
- at. Stepan Zhyhalo,
- at. Mykhailo Liakhovych,
- at. Nazar Chornyi – now.
