= Bohorodczany County =

Bohorodczany County Powiat bohorodczański
- Powiat
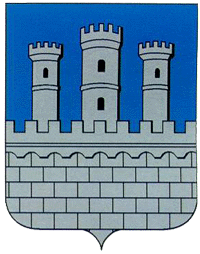
- Coat of arms

- Country: Second Polish Republic
- Voivodeship: Stanisławów
- Seat: Bohorodczany

Area
  - Total: 854 km^{2} (330 sq mi)

Population (1921)
  - Total: 52,895
  - Density: 619/km^{2} (1,600/sq mi)

Bohorodczany County (Polish: Powiat bohorodczański; Ukrainian: Богородчанський повіт) was a former Polish county (Powiat) in the Stanisławów Voivodeship in Southeastern Poland.

== History ==
On 1 April 1923 the Bitków municipality (gmina) was transferred from Bohorodczany County into the neighbouring Nadwórna County; On 1 July 1925 the Mołotków municipality was also transferred from Bohorodczany County into Nadwórna County.

On 1 April 1932 Bohorodczany County was abolished, its territory divided between Nadwórna County and Stanisławów County.
