= Defence of Wicyń =

Defense of Wicyń
- Part of the Massacres of the Poles in the Volhynia and Galicia during the Polish–Ukrainian ethnic conflict in the World War II
Date	1943 – 1944
Location	Wicyń
Result	Polish victory

Belligerents
Polish Self–Defense; Home Army	Ukrainian Insurgent Army; Germany

Commanders and leaders
Marcin Barabasz	Unknown

The Defense of Wicyń fighting by Polish self-defense forces based on the structures of the Home Army in the village of Wicyń, in Zolochiv County, against units of the UPA, ending with the repulse of Ukrainian attacks. The self-defense outpost in Wicyń, which provided shelter to up to 5,000 Poles, survived until the end of the German occupation despite a pacification carried out by the Germans on 25 April 1944.

== Background ==
Wicyń was an almost entirely Polish village in Zolochiv County, which in 1931 had 237 households and a population of about 1,500. In the face of the threat posed by Ukrainian nationalists in mid-1943, a strong self-defense outpost was established in the village. The initiator of its creation and its commander was a Home Army soldier, the pre-war head of the Wicyń commune and commander of the “Riflemen's Association” organization, Marcin Barabasz, nom de guerre “Soplica”.

The self-defense unit in Wicyń, operating within the structures of the Zolochiv District of the Home Army, constituted the 4th Company of the 52nd Home Army Infantry Regiment. In addition to the unit formed from the native inhabitants of the village, there were two small “incoming” (reinforcement) units operating in Wicyń, commanded by Mikołaj Mazurek, nom de guerre “Dąb,” and Winicjusz Weretczuk, nom de guerre “Gryf”.

Wicyń was heavily fortified the main bastions bore the codenames Lech, Czech, and Rus. Shelters for the civilian population were also constructed.

The self-defense outpost was relatively well armed among other sources, weapons were obtained from a German commander from the Poznań region, who, after a conversation with a Polish priest from Ciemiężyce, left the Poles a number of rifles, grenades, and ammunition. Another source of weapons was Soviet partisan units, who were hosted in Wicyń.

=== Collaboration with the Soviets and hiding Jews ===
From December 1943 until the end of March 1944, a unit of Soviet partisans from S. Malikov’s detachment (commanded by B. D. Korzeniowski) was stationed in Wicyń, strengthening the village’s defense. Temporarily, a sabotage group under B. D. Krutokov was also present in Wicyń, carrying out acts of sabotage on railway lines together with the Home Army fighters.

By order of the Home Army Headquarters (KG AK), the Wicyń self-defense unit provided support to Soviet reconnaissance groups, escorting them behind German lines.

The inhabitants of Wicyń provided shelter to Jews, especially women and children who had escaped from the ghettos in Peremyshliany and Zolochiv. They also supplied food and ammunition to larger groups of Jews hiding in the forests. The parish priest of the Roman Catholic parish in Wicyń, Rev. Jan Walter, hid Jehoshua Schleyen in the spring of 1944 by employing him as a church sexton, and also provided food to Ethel Moskowicz.

== UPA-Germany talks ==
In March 1944, an agreement was concluded between the commander of a UPA battalion, Ivan Pytlovany, nom de guerre “Honta,” and the command of a Wehrmacht unit operating in Berezhany County. In exchange for the exchange of intelligence information and assistance in eliminating Soviet saboteurs and local communists, the Ukrainians obtained consent for German artillery support for a UPA attack on Wicyń. As a result of the agreement, a joint manhunt was carried out by two UPA sotnias and a German infantry company, during which “many Jews and a Polish courier” were captured. The cooperation ended later that same month with the disbandment of “Honta’s” battalion and his removal from command, probably because he had entered into talks with the Germans without the approval of the leadership of the Organization of Ukrainian Nationalists.

== UPA attacks ==
On the night of April 9–10, 1944, the self-defense unit repelled an attack by the UPA on Wicyń, losing 19 soldiers. The village lost contact with the AK command in Zolochiv, and the couriers sent to Wicyn were being killed.

In May 1944, the Eastern Section of the Department of Information and Press of the Polish Government Delegation for Poland reported that before April 25, 1944, Wicyń had repelled two UPA attacks, losing 22 people and 20 farms burned. Ukrainian losses in these fights were estimated at several dozen killed.

== Pacification ==
According to Szczepan Siekierka and Henryk Komański , the Banderites, being unable to destroy Wicyn on their own, provoked a German pacification through informant reports. At dawn on 25 April 1944, self-defense guard posts reported the approach of large, regular German units equipped with armored vehicles. In this situation, Marcin Barabasz considered resistance to be pointless and ordered that people hide and conceal their weapons, or alternatively that the self-defense soldiers withdraw into the forest and only there take up the fight.

Wicyń was shelled with small arms and artillery, as a result of which some buildings caught fire. The village was then occupied by German units. Father Waltera, who did not go into hiding, was brought before a German officer, who demanded that he hand over Soviet partisans and any hidden weapons. When the clergyman stated that there were neither partisans nor weapons in the village, the intruders began searching the buildings and arresting the men they found. Those who attempted to flee were shot at.

In total, about 200 men were arrested and, together with Father Waltera, were taken to Pomoriany. After three days, the detainees were released, and all of them demonstratively returned to Wicyń.

Sources give different figures regarding the losses suffered by Poles as a result of the pacification of Wicyń. According to Damian Markowski, 10 people were killed and 19 homesteads were burned down. The Eastern Department of Information and Press of the Delegature of the Polish Government in Exile reported 15 Poles killed and a few homesteads burned the pacification was said to have been carried out by a Wehrmacht unit. According to Komański and Siekierka, 26 people were killed and half of the village was burned. These authors blame a subunit of the Waffen-SS Galizien Division for carrying out the pacification.

== Aftermath ==
Despite the pacification, the self-defence post survived until the end of the German occupation in July 1944. The Home Army unit from Wicyń then took part in Operation Tempest.

Wicyń was the largest rural Polish self-defence post in the region, where residents of neighbouring localities also sought refuge. Altogether, the number of people gathered in Wicyń may have reached up to 5,000.

== Bibliography ==
- Adamczyk, Mieczysław; Gmitruk, Janusz; Koseski, Adam, eds. (2006). Ziemie wschodnie: meldunki tygodniowe Sekcji Wschodniej Departamentu Informacji i Prasy Delegatury Rządu na Kraj kwiecień-lipiec 1944 r. Delegatura Rządu Rzeczypospolitej Polskiej na Kraj. Warszawa: Aspra-JR. ISBN 978-83-89964-84-7.
- Komański, Henryk; Siekierka, Szczepan (2006). Ludobójstwo dokonane przez nacjonalistów ukraińskich na Polakach w Województwie Tarnopolskim 1939-1946 (Wyd. 2., popr ed.). Wrocław: Nortom. ISBN 978-83-89684-61-5.
- Markowski, Damian Karol (2023). W cieniu Wołynia: "antypolska akcja" OUN i UPA w Galicji Wschodniej 1943-1945 (Wydanie 1-sze ed.). Kraków: Wydawnictwo Literackie. ISBN 978-83-08-08166-2.
- Tyndorf, Richard; Zieliński, Zygmunt, eds. (2023). Wartime rescue of Jews by the Polish catholic clergy: the testimony of survivors and rescuers. Lublin: Wydawnictwo KUL. ISBN 978-83-8288-040-3.
- Węgierski, Jerzy (1989). W lwowskiej Armii Krajowej (Wyd. 1 ed.). Warszawa: Instytut Wydawniczy Pax. ISBN 978-83-211-1044-8.
