= Karol Hadaczek =

Polish archaeologist (1873–1914)

- Karel Hadáček
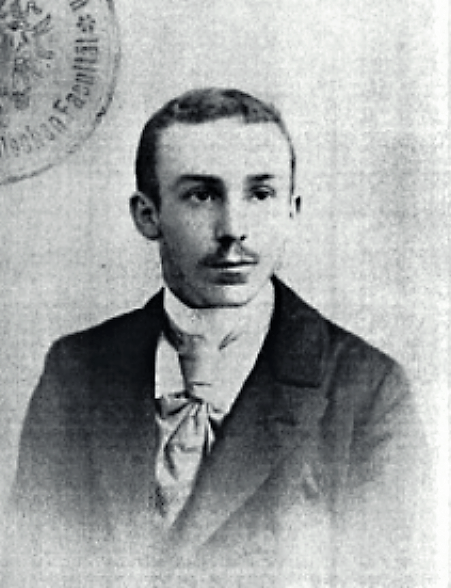
- Born: 24 January 1873; Hrabovets
- Died: 19 December 1914 (aged 41); Lviv
- Education: University of Lviv; University of Vienna
- Occupation: Archaeologist

Karol Hadaczek (Czech: Karel Hadáček; 24 January 1873 – 20 December 1914) was Polish archaeologist, professor at Lviv University, member of the Polish Academy of Arts and Sciences, member of the Lviv Historical Society.

== Biography ==
He was educated in elementary schools in Lachowce and Bohorodczany, and attended high gymnasium in Stanisławów (graduated in 1893). From 1893 to 1897 he studied classical philology and Polish literature at the University of Lviv, including under Ludwik Ćwikliński. Thanks to Ćwikliński's support, he left in 1897 for supplementary studies in Vienna. He studied classical archaeology, ancient history, prehistory, numismatics and art history at the university there, and crowned his studies with a doctorate in 1900. In the following years, he conducted scientific research in Greece, Italy and Germany. Upon his return in 1903, he defended his habilitation thesis at the University of Lviv and became an associate professor at the Department of Classical Archaeology and Prehistory; at the same time, he headed the Archaeological Department of the Dzieduszycki Museum in Lviv and was a conservator for the maintenance of prehistoric monuments at the Lviv Conservation Office. In 1905, he was appointed associate professor and took charge of the Department of Classical Archaeology and Prehistory at Lviv University; in the 1913/1914 academic year, he served as dean of the Faculty of Philosophy. As part of an Austrian expedition, he participated in excavations in Egypt (1911–1913).

In 1909, he was appointed as a correspondent member of the AU (later PAU). He was also a correspondent member (1903), then a full member (1905) of the Archaeological Institute in Vienna. He was regarded as a man of gentle disposition, but often came into conflict with those around him, including over rivalries over the position of the chair he held at the university. After the outbreak of World War I, during the siege of Lviv, he suffered a mental breakdown caused by the war, financial problems and misunderstanding and envy from some archaeologists. He died a suicidal death (he shot himself). He was buried in Lychakiv Cemetery in Lviv, but his grave is now gone. His students included Bohdan Janusz, Włodzimierz Antoniewicz and Józef Kostrzewski.

== Works ==
In his scientific work, he was involved in prehistory and the archaeology of ancient Greece. He examined about 200 graves in a Roman-period cemetery in the village of Gać near Przeworsk and put forward the hypothesis that the culture there was created by people of Germanic origin[4]. From his research at the site, Czech researcher Lubor Niederle coined the term "Przeworsk culture", with which he replaced the previously used term "Venedic culture".

He has published more than 50 scientific papers, including:

- Nowo odkryty dyplom żołnierski z czasów Domicyana (1897)
- Kilka uwag o czasach prehistorycznych Galicji (1897–1898)
- Z badań archeologicznych w dorzeczu Bugu (1900)
- Ślady epoki tzw. archaiczno-mykeńskiej we wschodniej Galicyi (1901)
- Z badań archeologicznych w dorzeczu Dniestru (1902)
- Der Ohrschmuck der Griechen und Etrusken (1903)
- Grób Neptolemosa w Delfach (1903)
- Rzeźba w usługach świątyni greckiej (1903)
- Światowid (1904)
- Złote skarby michałkowskie (1904)
- Dział przedhistoryczny Muzeum im. Dzieduszyckich (1907)
- Polygnotos, pierwszy klasyk malarstwa greckiego (1908)
- Cmentarzysko ciałopalne koło Przeworska (1909)
- Kultura dorzecza Dniestru w epoce cesarstwa rzymskiego (1912)
- Osada przemysłowa w Koszyłowcach z epoki eneolitu (1914)

== Bibliography ==
- Гадачек Карло // Енциклопедія українознавства : Словникова частина : [в 11 т.] / Наукове товариство імені Шевченка ; гол. ред. проф., д-р Володимир Кубійович. — Париж — Нью-Йорк : Молоде життя, 1955. — Кн. 2, [т. 1] : А — Головна Руська Рада. — С. 332. — ISBN 5-7707-4049-3.
- Hadachek Karlo / B. Z. Yakymovych // Encyclopedia of Modern Ukraine [Online] / Eds. : I. М. Dziuba, A. I. Zhukovsky, M. H. Zhelezniak [et al.] ; National Academy of Sciences of Ukraine, Shevchenko Scientific Society. – Kyiv : The NASU institute of Encyclopedic Research, 2006.
- Biogramy uczonych polskich, Część I: Nauki społeczne, zeszyt 1; A-J, Wrocław 1983.
- Jerzy Pilecki, Hadaczek Karol (1873—1914) w: Polski Słownik Biograficzny, Wrocław – Warszawa – Kraków : Zakład Narodowy Imienia Ossolińskich, Wydawnictwo Polskiej Akademii Nauk 1961, tom IX/2, zeszyt 41, s. 223–224.
