= Poliany, Zolochiv Raion, Lviv Oblast =

Rural locality in Lviv Oblast, Ukraine

Poliany Поморяни
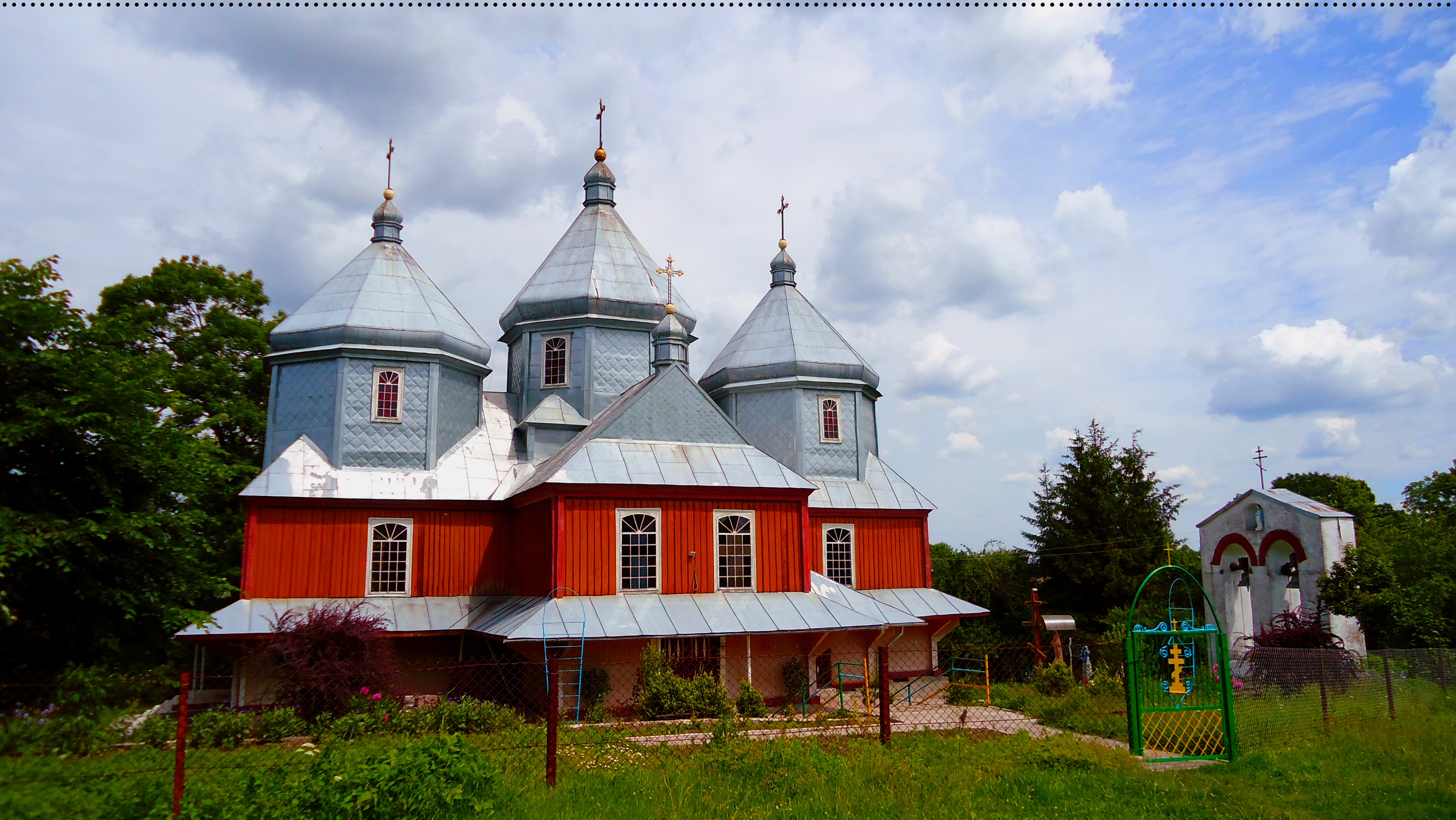
- Resurrection Church

- Location in Lviv Oblast
- Coordinates: 49°44′34″N 24°59′39″E
- Country: Ukraine
- Oblast: Lviv
- Raion: Zolochiv
- Hromada: Pomoriany settlement
- Time zone: UTC+2 (EET)
  - Summer (DST): UTC+3 (EEST)
- Postal code: 80752

Poliany (Ukrainian: Поляни), known as Rykiv until 1946, is a village in Pomoriany settlement hromada, Zolochiv Raion, Lviv Oblast, Ukraine.

== History ==
The first mention of the village dates back to 1453.

== Religion ==
- Church of the Resurrection (1903, architect Vasyl Nahirnyi, the only wooden church with paintings by Modest Sosenko)
