= Zhukiv =

Zhukiv (Ukrainian: Жуків) may refer to the following places in Ukraine:

- Zhukiv, Ivano-Frankivsk Oblast, a village in Ivano-Frankivsk Raion, Ivano-Frankivsk Oblast
- Zhukiv, Khmelnytskyi Oblast, a village in Shepetivka Raion, Khmelnytskyi Oblast
- Zhukiv, Lviv Oblast, a village in Zolochiv Raion, Lviv Oblast
- Zhukiv, Ternopil Oblast, a village in Ternopil Raion, Ternopil Oblast
