= Pomoriany Castle =

Ruined castle in Ukraine

Coordinates: 49°37′47″N 24°56′18″E

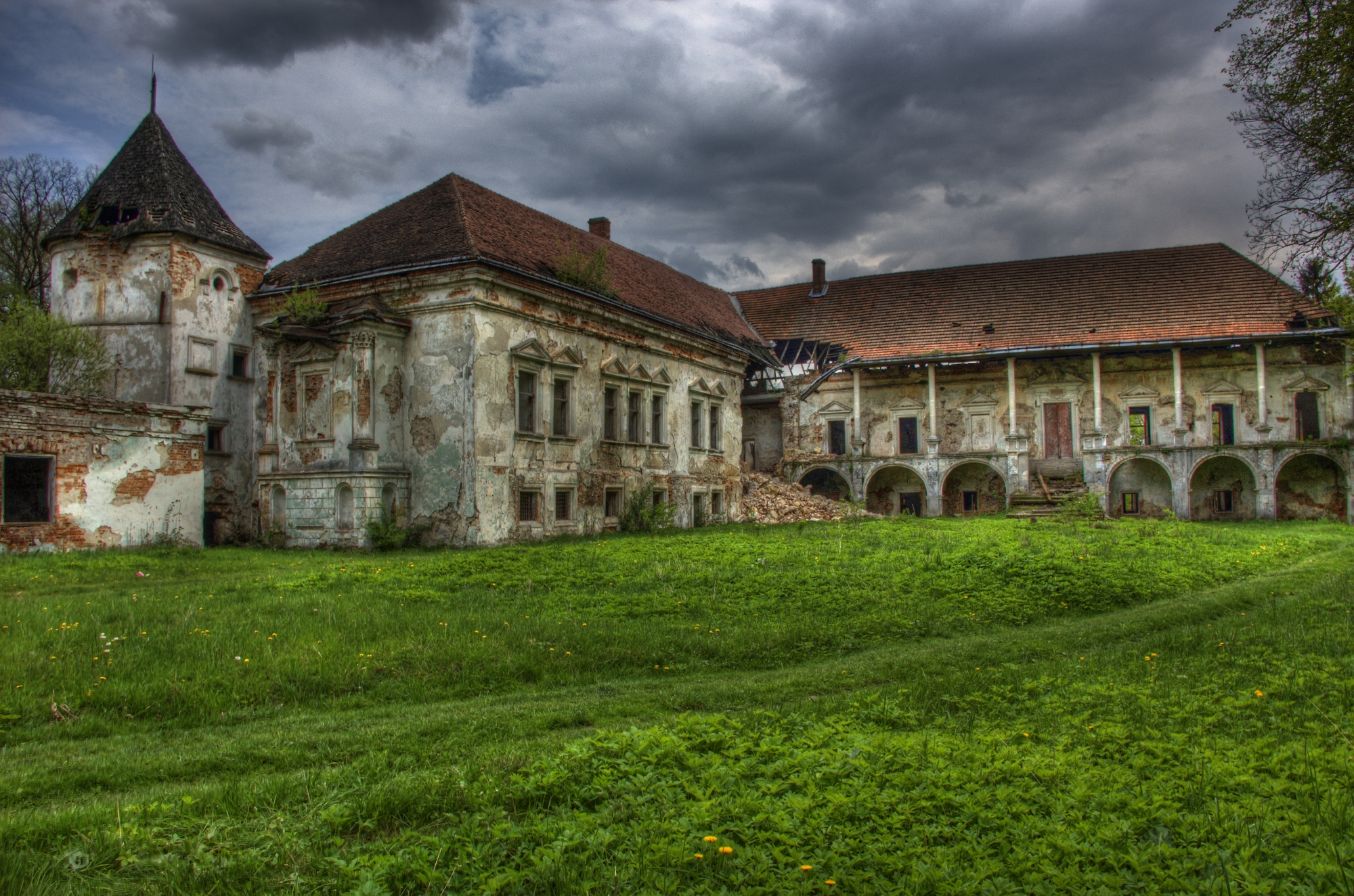
- The ruins of Pomoriany Castle.
- Interactive map of Pomoriany Castle

Immovable Monument of National Significance of Ukraine
- Official name: Замок-палац (Castle palace)
- Type: Architecture
- Reference no.: 130089

The Pomoriany Castle (Ukrainian: Поморянський замок, romanized: Pomorians'kyi zamok, Polish: Zamek w Pomorzanach) is a ruined castle in the rural settlement of Pomoriany, Zolochiv Raion, Lviv Oblast, Ukraine. It originated in the 16th century as a well-fortified noble residence on the bank of the Zolota Lypa River. The castle's early owners included Mikołaj Świnka and Jan Sienieński.

The estate suffered badly at the hands of the Cossacks and Turks (1675, 1684) but Jan III Sobieski invested in the restoration in order to make Pomorzany one of his country residences. Sobieski's death in 1696 was followed by another long period of decline.

A real change came about in the castle's fortunes when, in 1789, Erasm Pruszyński started transforming the dilapidated building into a modern residence. He had the barbican gate, three towers and several wings of the old structure torn down, however.

As recently as 1939, Pomorzany was owned by the famous Potocki family. Following the September Campaign, the building was adapted for use as a school, but it was finally abandoned to rot in the late 1970s.
