= Hrabovets, Ivano-Frankivsk Oblast =

Rural locality in Ivano-Frankivsk Oblast, Ukraine

Hrabovets Грабовець
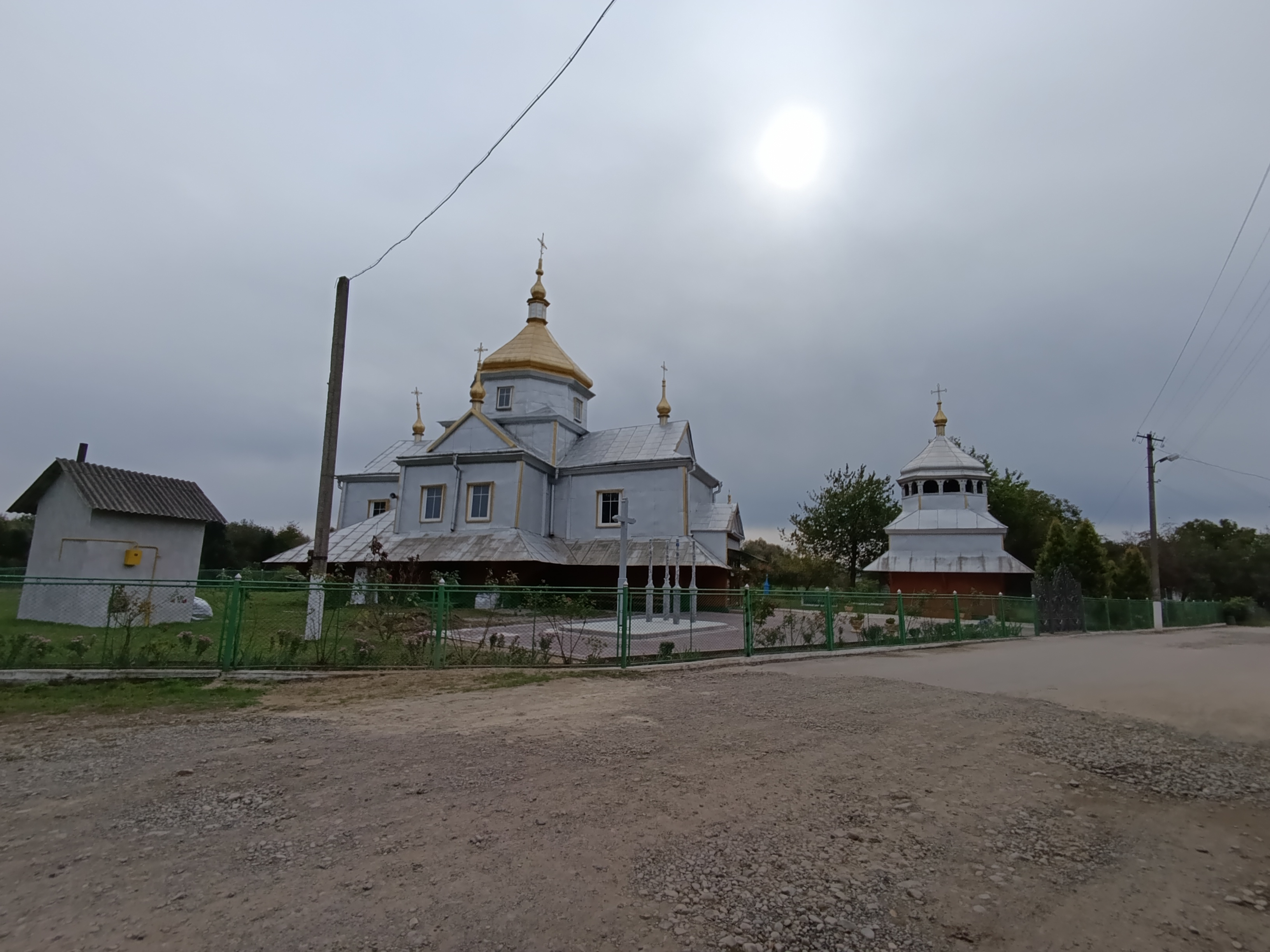
- Ascension Church in Hrabovets

- Location in Ivano-Frankivsk Oblast Hrabovets (Ukraine)
- Coordinates: 48°44′54″N 24°37′7″E
- Country: Ukraine
- Oblast: Ivano-Frankivsk Oblast
- Raion: Ivano-Frankivsk Raion
- Hromada: Bohorodchany settlement hromada
- Time zone: UTC+2 (EET)
  - Summer (DST): UTC+3 (EEST)
- Postal code: 77762

Hrabovets (Ukrainian: Грабовець, Polish: Grabowiec) is a village located on the Bystrytsia river in the Bohorodchany settlement hromada of the Ivano-Frankivsk Raion of Ivano-Frankivsk Oblast in Ukraine.

== History ==
Early Slavic graves from the 3-6th centuries AD have been discovered in the area. Two fortified locations from the Kyivan Rus period also existed here. A trove of Arabic dirhams found near the village was transferred to the National Museum in Lviv.

The first written mention of the village comes from 1386. A defensive fortification, which was located here during the 16-17th centuries, was studied by Yaroslav Pasternak in 1935.

In Soviet times Hrabovets was administratively subjected to Nadvirna Raion. On 19 July 2020, as a result of the administrative-territorial reform and liquidation of the Bohorodchany Raion, the village became part of the Stryi Raion.

== Religion ==
- Church of the Resurrection (1887, wooden)
- Church of the Ascension (1856, wooden)

== Notable residents ==
- Iryna Velenska (1906–1990), Ukrainian writer, journalist, public figure
- Karol Hadaczek, Professor of Archaeology at Lviv University, the most prominent figure of the archaeological school of Galicia in the late 19th and early 20th centuries, a researcher of the ancient culture of Podillia and Opillia

== Bibliography ==
- "Grabowiec, 5.) wś, pow. bohorodczański". Geographical Dictionary of the Kingdom of Poland (in Polish). 2. Warszawa: Kasa im. Józefa Mianowskiego. 1881. p. 778.
