= Peczeniżyn County =

Peczeniżyn County Powiat peczeniżyński
- Powiat
- Coat of arms

- Country: Second Polish Republic
- Voivodeship: Stanisławów
- Seat: Peczeniżyn

Area
  - Total: 496 km^{2} (192 sq mi)

Population (1921)
  - Total: 43,085
  - Density: 869/km^{2} (2,250/sq mi)

Peczeniżyn County (Polish: Powiat peczeniżyński; Ukrainian: Печеніжинський повіт) was a former Polish county (Powiat) in the Stanisławów Voivodeship in Southeastern Poland.

The county was established in 1921 as a direct successor of the Austrian Peczeniżyn District (German: Bezirk Peczeniżyn, Polish: Powiat peczeniżyński). On April 1, 1929, the county was liquidated and its territory was incorporated into the neighbouring Kołomyja County.

== History ==
Ukrainian administration sprang up on the territory of the former Austrian Peczeniżyn District following the proclamation of the West Ukrainian People's Republic on November 1, 1918. The local Ukrainian government in Pechenizhyn (Polish: Peczeniżyn), headed by judge Genyk-Berezovskyi came to be known as the "Pechenizhyn Republic"—lasting for 3 months. Under ZUNR administration, lieutenant Simenovych was appointed as county commissioner.

Ukrainian administration in Pechenizhyn came to an end with the Romanian occupation of Pokuttya in early 1919, when Romanian troops occupied the territory of the former Austrian district. In August that same year administration over the district was transferred to Poland.

Under the Second Polish Republic, the county capital Peczeniżyn struggled economically, with the Peczeniżyn oil refinery having to cease operations in 1928 due to depletion of oil reserves.

Ultimately, on April 1, 1929, Peczeniżyn County was liquidated and annexed in its entirety into the neighbouring Kołomyja County.
