= Bohdan Janusz =

Polish and Ukrainian archaeologist, historian, ethnographer, conservator (1887–1930)

- Богдан Януш
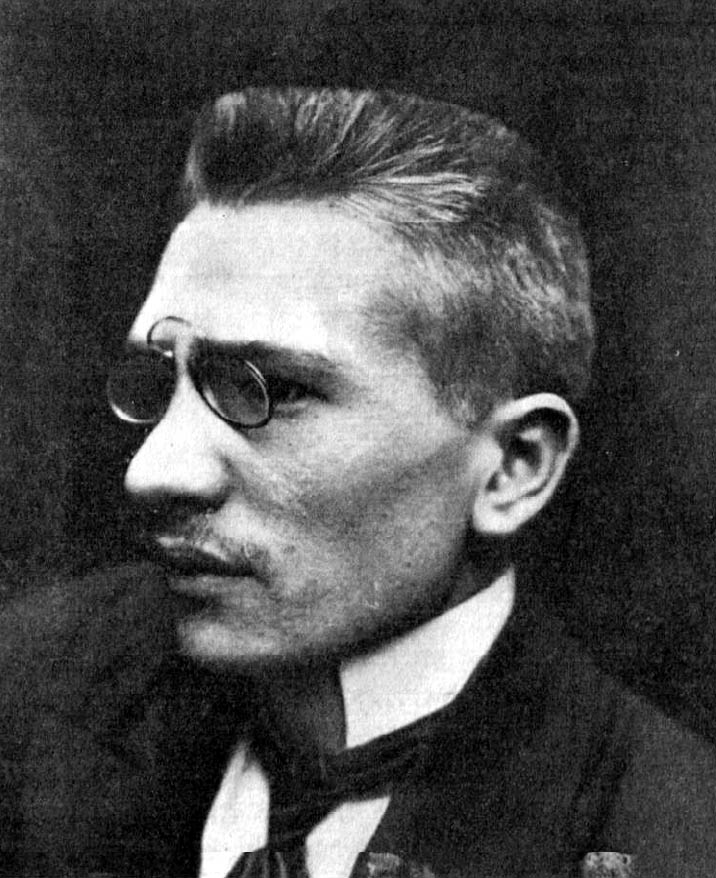
- Born: 23 January 1887; Lviv
- Died: 5 November 1930 (aged 43); Lviv
- Occupation(s): Archaeologist, historian, ethnographer, conservator

Bohdan Janusz (Ukrainian: Богдан Януш; 23 January 1887 – 5 November 1930) was Polish and Ukrainian archaeologist, historian, ethnographer, conservator of prehistoric monuments in Lwów Voivodeship.

== Biography ==
He was born on 23 January 1887 in Lviv to a Ukrainian family. A pupil of the Polish archaeologist Karol Hadaczek. Before World War I, he was a long-time editor of the Kurier Lwowski. In 1907 he became a member of the Shevchenko Scientific Society. He was the author of many works on prehistory and art history, including Typy etniczne i kulturalne w prehistorji Galicji wschodniej (1911), Człowiek przedhistoryczny (Warsaw, 1914), and an extremely important and interesting work for Polish archaeology, Zabytki przedhistoryczne Galicji wschodniej (1918), compiling all the excavations in Eastern Lesser Poland known up to 1918. He published another monograph entitled Kultura przedhistoryczna Podola galicyjskiego (1914) in 1919 in excerpts in Przewodnik Naukowy i Literacki (Guide was a monthly supplement to Gazeta Lwowska).

In 1920, Janusz took up the post of conservator of pre-historic monuments of the Lviv district, which he held for several years. In the same year, he began publishing a monthly magazine "Wiadomości Konserwatorskie" dedicated to art and cultural monuments, which, however, was disbanded due to low interest. He also took a hobbyist interest in the history of Armenians in Poland.

== Death and legacy ==
He died by suicide on 5 November 1930; he shot himself in a hotel in Lviv.). He was buried in Lychakiv Cemetery.

In 1993, a street in Lviv's Pidzamche neighborhood was named after Bohdan Janusz.

== Works ==
- Typy etniczne i kulturalne w prehistorji Galicji wschodniej (1911)
- Z pradziejów ziemi Lwowskiej (1913)
- Kultura przedhistoryczna Podola galicyjskiego (1914)
- Człowiek przedhistoryczny (1914)
- 293 dni rządów rosyjskich we Lwowie (3. IX. 1914 - 22. VI. 1915) (1915)
- Zabytki przedhistoryczne Galicyi wschodniej (1918)
- Przeszłość i zabytki województwa Tarnopolskiego (1926)

== Bibliography ==
- Kamil Adamczyk Bohdan Janusz – człowiek, który kochał zabytki [dostęp 2013-10-20]
- Z żałobnej karty. ś. p. Bohdan Janusz, „Z Otchłani Wieków”, t. 1, 1931, S. 13.
- Януш Богдан // Енциклопедія українознавства, Lwów 1993, t. 10, S. 3978.
- Булик Н. М. Життя і діяльність Богдана Януша в контексті інтелектуального середовища Галичини // Матеріали і дослідження з археології Прикарпаття і Волині. — Львів, 2014. — Вип. 18. — С. 442–468.
- Burchard H. Janusz Bohdan, pseud. Wasyl Karpowicz (ok. 1888–1930) // Polski Słownik Biograficzny. — Wrocław — Warszawa — Kraków: Zakład Narodowy imienia Ossolińskich, Wydawnictwo Polskiej Akademii Nauk, 1963. — T. Х/4, zeszyt 47. — S. 587–588.
