= Mikhail Grulenko =

Soviet politician (1904–1941)

Mykhailo Hrulenko

1st Secretary of the Stanislav Oblast Regional Committee of CP(b)U
- In office 27 November 1939 – 4 August 1941
- Preceded by: position created
- Succeeded by: position liquidated after World War II Mykhailo Slon

Head of the Provisional Civilian Administration of Stanisławów Voivodeship
- In office 6 October 1939 – 27 November 1939
- Preceded by: position created previously in Poland Stanisław Jarecki as voivode
- Succeeded by: position liquidated

Personal details
- Born: 1904 Konotop, Chernigov Governorate, Russian Empire
- Died: 4 August 1941 (aged 36–37) near Uman, Ukrainian SSR, Soviet Union
- Party: Communist Party (b) of Ukraine

Mykhailo Vasylyovych Hrulenko (Ukrainian: Михайло Васильович Груленко; 1904 – 4 August 1941) was a Czechoslovak, Ukrainian and Soviet politician, who served as the 1st Secretary of the Stanislav Oblast Regional Committee of CP(b)U (the Communist Party of Ukraine).

== Early life ==
Hrulenko was born in 1904 in the village of Konotop, which was then part of the Chernigov Governorate in the Russian Empire, into a large family as he was the ninth child. His father was a carpenter. Upon the outbreak of the Russian Revolution, he became a worker, and joined the Bolsheviks ahead of the October Revolution.

== Political career ==
He was eventually elected Secretary of the Komsomol cell for the local Konotop locomotive depot. He then became Secretary of the Konotop District Committee of the Komsomol. Prior to going to a higher school, he was the Head of the Department of Culture and Propaganda for the Shostka District Committee of the Komsomol. He was then a cadet of the higher party school. Upon returning, he became the instructor for the Chernihiv district committee, before going back into various party work.

He then became Head of the Political Department of Fedorovsky state farm, which was located within Kharkiv Oblast. From May 1938 up until November 1939, he was the 2nd Secretary of the Kamianets-Podilskyi Regional Committee. Simultaneously, he headed the provisional administration on the newly occupied Polish territories (Stanisławów Voivodeship) by the Soviet Union, which was incorporated into Stanislav Oblast. Then, from November 1949 to 1941, he was 1st Secretary of the Stanislav Oblast Regional Committee of CP(b)U.

In August 1941 Grulenko died at the World War II Eastern Front near Uman, Kiev Oblast.

He has been listed on the "decommunization list" in Ukraine, which identifies former Soviet officials whose names cannot be used for public memorialization.
