= Stari Bohorodchany rural hromada =

Hromada in Ivano-Frankivsk Oblast, Ukraine

Stari Bohorodchany rural hromada Старобогородчанська сільська громада
- hromada
- Location within Ivano-Frankivsk Oblast Location within Ukraine
- Coordinates: 48°49′50″N 24°31′12″E
- Country: Ukraine
- Oblast: Ivano-Frankivsk Oblast
- Raion: Ivano-Frankivsk Raion
- Administrative center: Stari Bohorodchany

Area
  - Total: 8,433 km^{2} (3,256 sq mi)

Population (2018)
  - Total: 6,045
- Villages: 5
- Website: st-bogorodchany-gromada.gov.ua

Stari Bohorodchany rural hromada (Ukrainian: Старобогородчанська сільська громада) is a hromada in Ukraine, in Ivano-Frankivsk Raion of Ivano-Frankivsk Oblast. The administrative center is the village of Stari Bohorodchany.

== Settlements ==
The hromada consists of 5 villages:

- Hrynivka
- Lesivka
- Nyvochyn
- Skobychivka
- Stari Bohorodchany
