= Bohorodchany =

Rural locality in Ivano-Frankivsk Oblast, Ukraine

Bohorodchany Богородчани
- Rural settlement
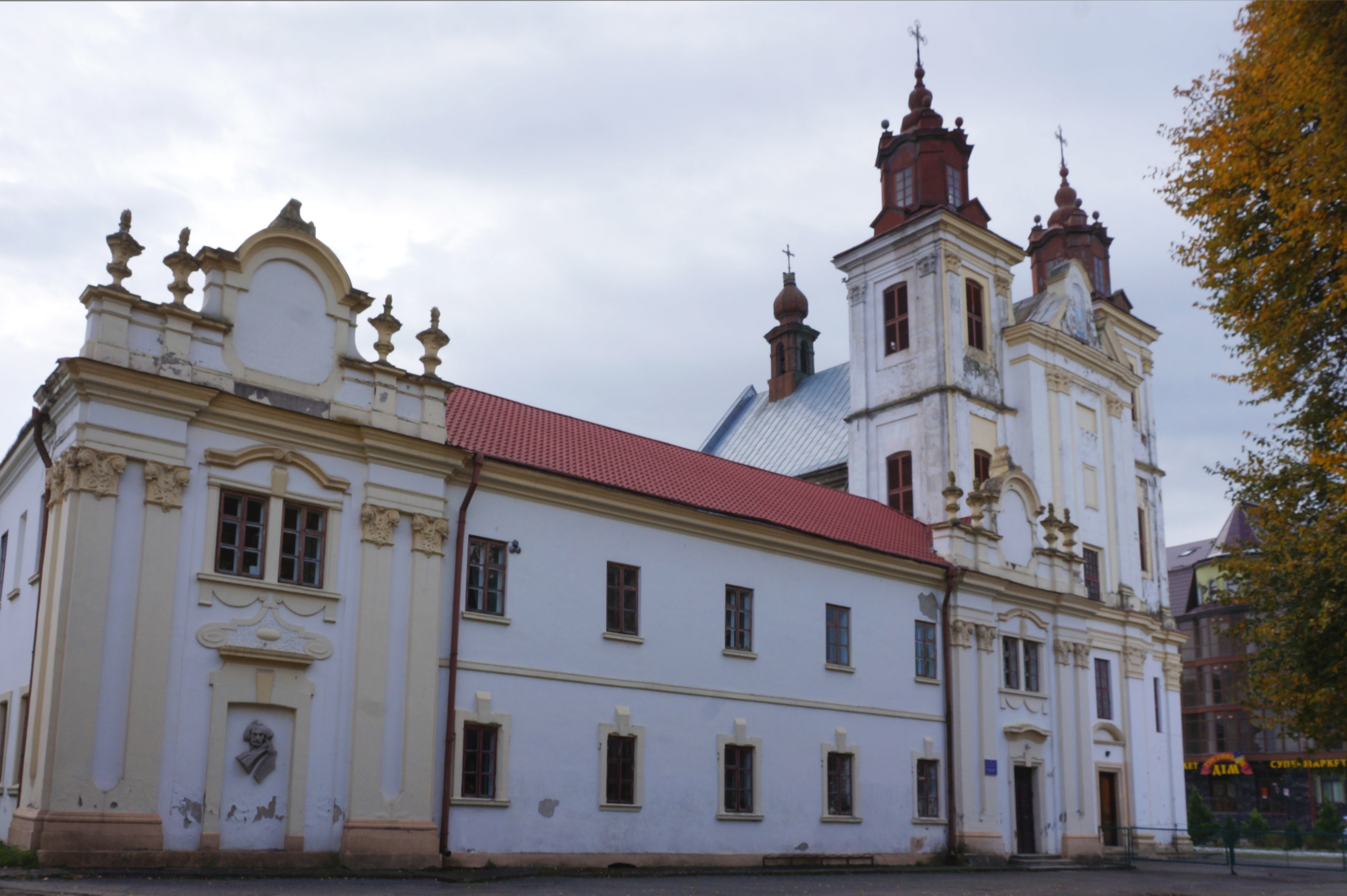
- Dominican monastery in Bohorodchany

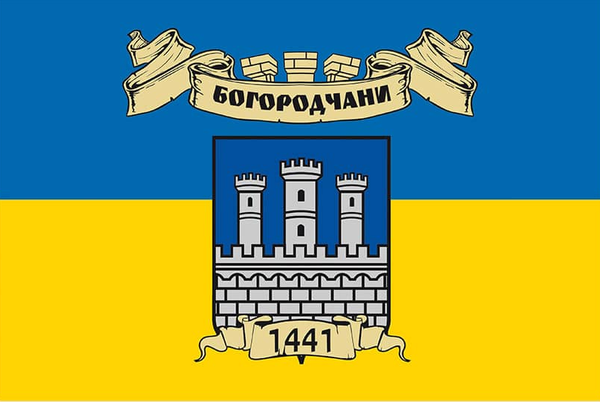
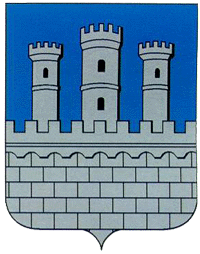
- Flag Coat of arms
- Interactive map of Bohorodchany
- Location of Bohorodchany, Ukraine Bohorodchany (Ukraine)
- Coordinates: 48°48′29″N 24°32′17″E
- Country: Ukraine
- Oblast: Ivano-Frankivsk Oblast
- Raion: Ivano-Frankivsk Raion
- Hromada: Bohorodchany settlement hromada
- Established: 1442

Area
  - Total: 12 km^{2} (4.6 sq mi)

Population (2022)
  - Total: 8,234
  - Density: 690/km^{2} (1,800/sq mi)
- Area code: +380 3471

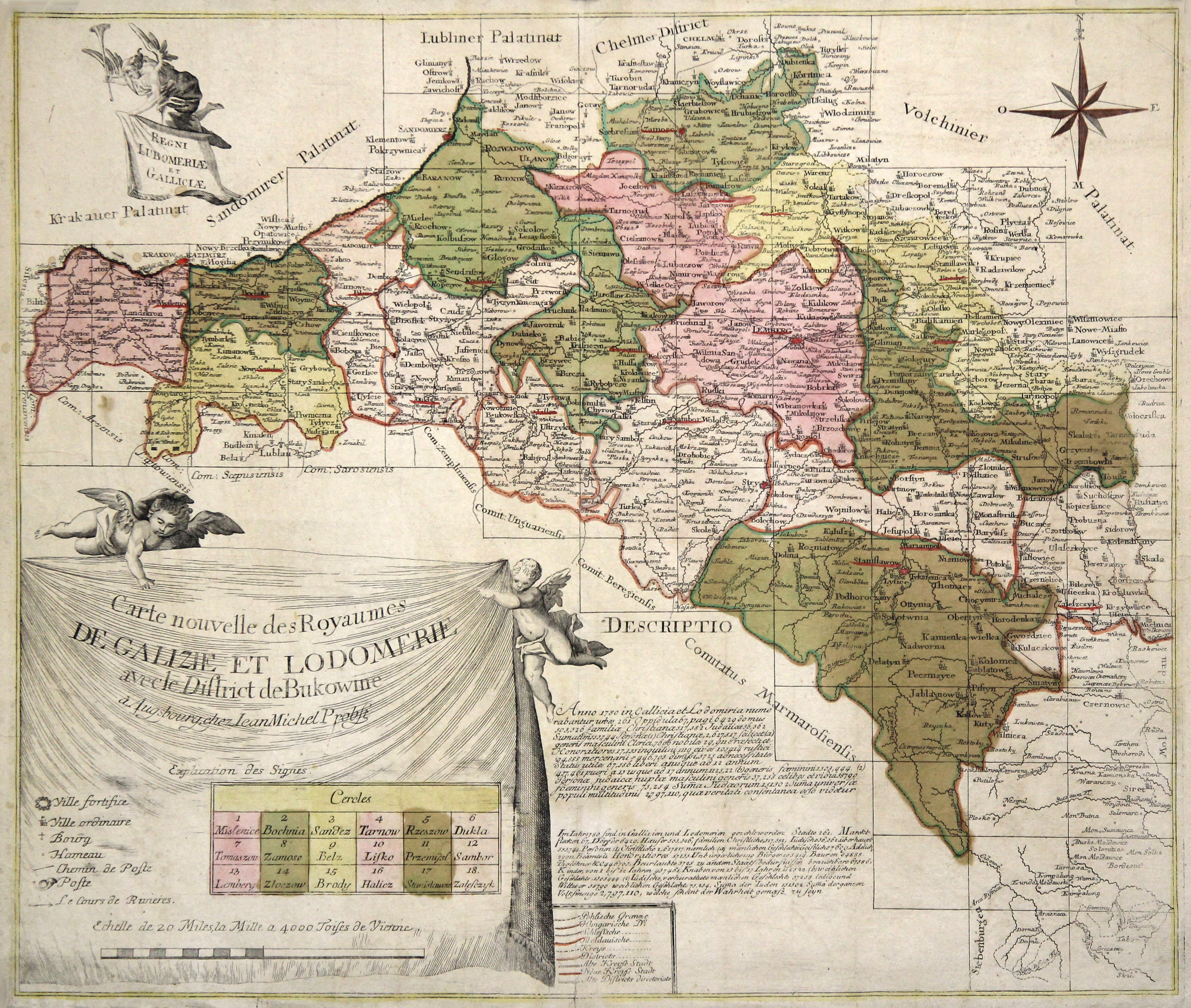
Podhorochany on the map of the Kingdom of Galicia and Lodomeria

Bohorodchany (Ukrainian: Богородчани, pronounced [boɦorodʒˈtʃɑnɪ, boɦoroˈtʃːɑnɪ]) is a rural settlement in Ivano-Frankivsk Raion, Ivano-Frankivsk Oblast, Ukraine. It is located several miles from the administrative center of the oblast, Ivano-Frankivsk. It hosts the administration of Bohorodchany settlement hromada, one of the hromadas of Ukraine. Population: 8,234 (2022 estimate). The settlement was also known as Podhorochany.

== History ==
It is not known when the town was established, but it was first mentioned in 1441 as a property of certain Jan of Buczacz, the starost of Trembowla (today Terebovlia). Since the second half of the 15th century the local estate belonged to the Potocki family. In 1691 Konstancja Potocka née Truskolaska, widow of the owner of the village Dominik Potocki, established a Roman Catholic church and a parish there. In 1742 the wooden church was replaced with a more permanent construction, founded by Stanisław Kossakowski and devoted to the cult of Holy Mary. In 1765 the new church was donated to the Dominican Order, whose friars established a convent there.

Later in the 18th century the town's area acted as a base for a local band of outlaws led by Oleksa Dovbush, a semi-legendary Hutsul folk hero, who according to a local legend took the town by force in 1744. In 1786 the town had 314 permanent buildings and 1,134 inhabitants.

Following the Partitions of Poland the town became part of the Habsburg Empire and then Austria-Hungary. In the 19th century the town was a scene of intense social and economic activities by all three major groups of inhabitants – Jews, Ukrainians and Poles. Already in 1770 a Polish language grammar school was established, followed by a Jewish Hertz Homberg school in 1785 and a state-sponsored German language grammar school in 1789. In 1848 a local branch of a Russka Rada (Ruthenian Council) was established by 29 local Ukrainians. Around the same time numerous Jewish social and educational facilities were established, including a Hebrew School of the Union of Hebrew Teachers of Austria (1908–1914), a local branch of Ezrat Israel zionist union (1896), a Torat Haim yeshiva (1908) and a grammar school for girls (1909). By the end of the 19th century the town grew to 4,597 inhabitants, including 2,009 Jews, 1,788 Greek Catholics and 800 Roman Catholics. The largest estates in the surrounding area belonged to Count Rudolf Stadion.

In the aftermath of World War I the town briefly belonged to ZUNR, but in 1919 was taken over by reborn Poland. The local life continued to flourish until World War II. The town was made a seat of a commune. In 1929 a Gmilut Hasadim welfare association was founded in the town.

Following the joint Nazi-Soviet invasion of Poland, the Germans occupied the town and, supported by the local Ukrainian police, murdered the local Jews. They were brought to a shooting site in groups of 10–20 people and executed. After the war, the town was seized by the Soviet Union and soon afterwards attached to Ukrainian SSR. Since 1991 it has been a part of Ukraine.

Until 18 July 2020, Bohorodchany was the administrative center of Bohorodchany Raion. The raion was abolished in July 2020 as part of the administrative reform of Ukraine, which reduced the number of raions of Ivano-Frankivsk Oblast to six. The area of Bohorodchany Raion was merged into Ivano-Frankivsk Raion.

Until 26 January 2024, Bohorodchany was designated urban-type settlement. On this day, a new law entered into force which abolished this status, and Bohorodchany became a rural settlement.

== Jewish culture ==
Bohorodchany is also known by its Yiddish name, Brotchin (בראטשין). A first-hand description of Jewish life in Bohorodchany pre-World War II can be found in the autobiography of Mark Hasten, who grew up there.

== Notable people ==
- Oleksa Hirnyk, a Soviet dissident.
- Bishop Ivan Lyatyshevskyi, a Ukrainian Greek-Catholic hierarch, Soviet prisoner.

== Links ==
- Media related to Bohorodchany at Wikimedia Commons
