= Zhukiv, Lviv Oblast =

Village in Lviv Oblast, Ukraine

Zhukiv Жуків Żuków
- Village
- Location within Lviv Oblast Location within Ukraine
- Coordinates: 49°42′48″N 24°48′00″E
- Country: Ukraine
- Oblast: Lviv Oblast
- Raion: Zolochiv Raion
- Hromada: Pomoriany settlement hromada
- Elevation: 371 m (1,217 ft)

Population (2021)
  - Total: 443
- Time zone: GMT+2
- Postal code: 80754
- Area code: +380 3265

Zhukiv (Ukrainian: Жуків) is a village located in Zolochiv Raion of Lviv Oblast (region) in western Ukraine. It belongs to Pomoriany settlement hromada, one of the hromadas of Ukraine.
