= Stari Bohorodchany =

Village in Ivano-Frankivsk Oblast, Ukraine

Stari Bohorodchany Старі Богородчани
- Village
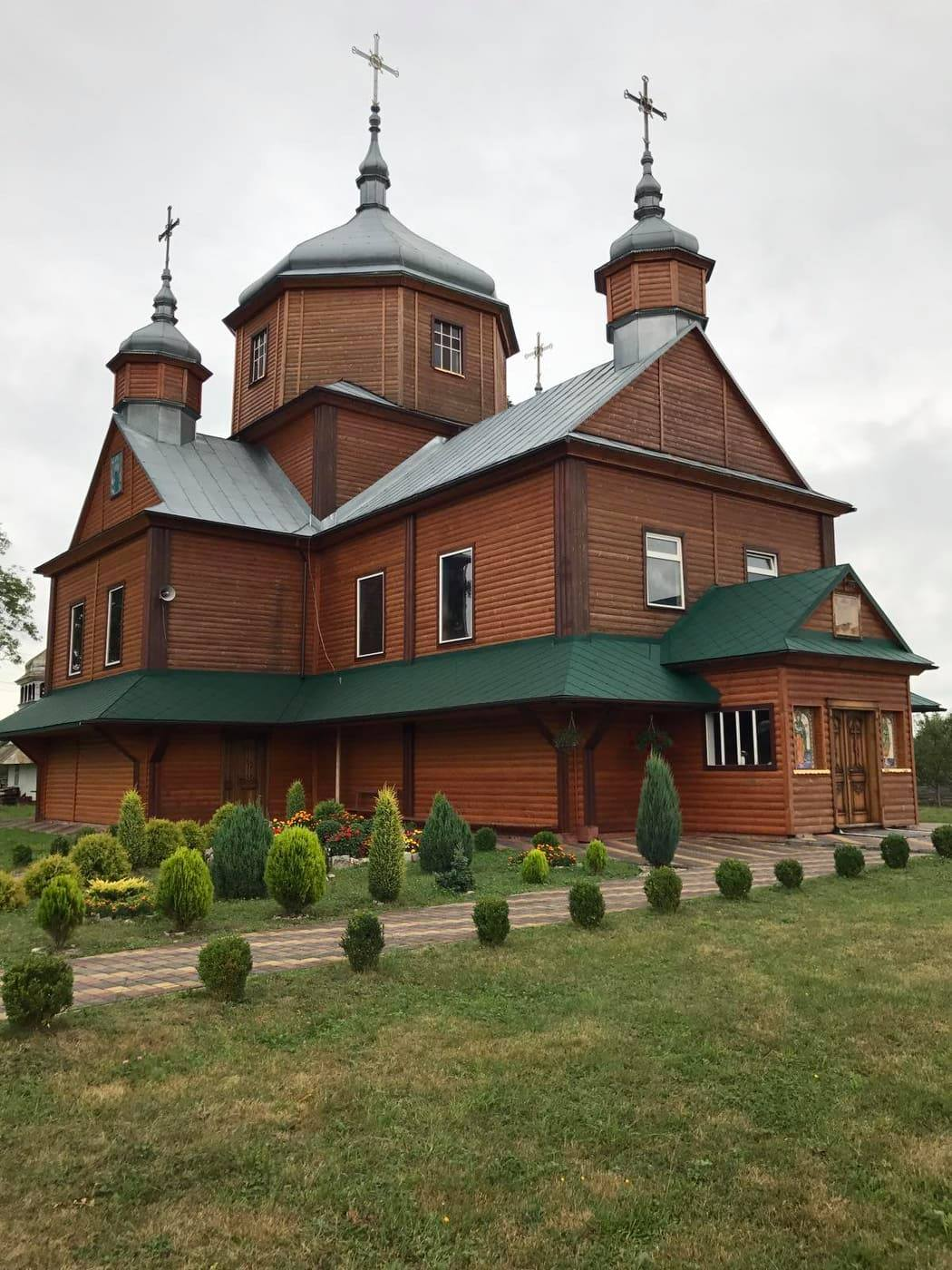
- Church of the Nativity of the Theotokos in Stari Bohorodchany

- Location of Stari Bohorodchany in Ivano-Frankivsk Oblast Location of Stari Bohorodchany in Ukraine
- Coordinates: 48°49′50″N 24°31′12″E
- Country: Ukraine
- Oblast: Ivano-Frankivsk Oblast
- Raion: Ivano-Frankivsk Raion
- First mentioned: 16 January 1441

Stari Bohorodchany (Ukrainian: Старі Богородчани; Polish: Bohorodczany Stare) is a village in Ivano-Frankivsk Oblast, Ukraine, located in Ivano-Frankivsk Raion. It is the administrative centre of Stari Bohorodchany rural hromada.

== History ==
The first mention of Stari Bohorodchany is in a Polish government act dating to 16 January 1441, in which it was referred to as being owned by "Ivan of Buchach". Under the Second Polish Republic, the village was seat of Gmina Bohorodczany Stare.

On 24 December 1945, Ukrainian Insurgent Army troops commanded by Pavlo Vatsyk destroyed an Internal Troops garrison in the village.

== Notable residents ==
- Viktor Starozhynskyi, Ukrainian Basilian monk
- Bohdan Mostytskyi, Ukrainian Insurgent Army commander
- Mykhailo Zarichnyi, Ukrainian mathematician
- Yaroslav Harasym, Ukrainian folklorist and philologist
