= Solotvyn settlement hromada =

Hromada in Ivano-Frankivsk Oblast, Ukraine

Solotvyn settlement hromada Солотвинська селищна громада
- hromada
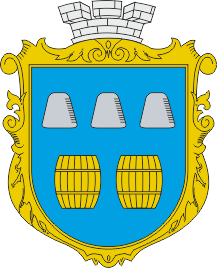
- Seal

- Location within Ivano-Frankivsk Oblast Location within Ukraine
- Coordinates: 48°40′08″N 24°17′40″E
- Country: Ukraine
- Oblast: Ivano-Frankivsk Oblast
- Raion: Ivano-Frankivsk Raion
- Administrative center: Solotvyn

Area
  - Total: 3,776 km^{2} (1,458 sq mi)

Population (2020)
  - Total: 26,207
- Rural settlement: 2
- Villages: 11
- Website: www.solselrada.gov.ua

Solotvyn settlement hromada (Ukrainian: Солотвинська селищна громада) is a hromada in Ukraine, in Ivano-Frankivsk Raion of Ivano-Frankivsk Oblast. The administrative center is the rural settlement of Solotvyn.

== Settlements ==
The hromada consists of 2 rural settlements (Solotvyn, Boiky) and 11 villages:

- Babche
- Bohrivka
- Huta
- Kryvets
- Krychka
- Maniava
- Markova
- Monastyrchany
- Porohy
- Rakovets
- Yablunka
