= Solotvyn =

Rural locality in Ivano-Frankivsk Oblast, Ukraine

Coordinates: 48°42′18″N 24°25′16″E

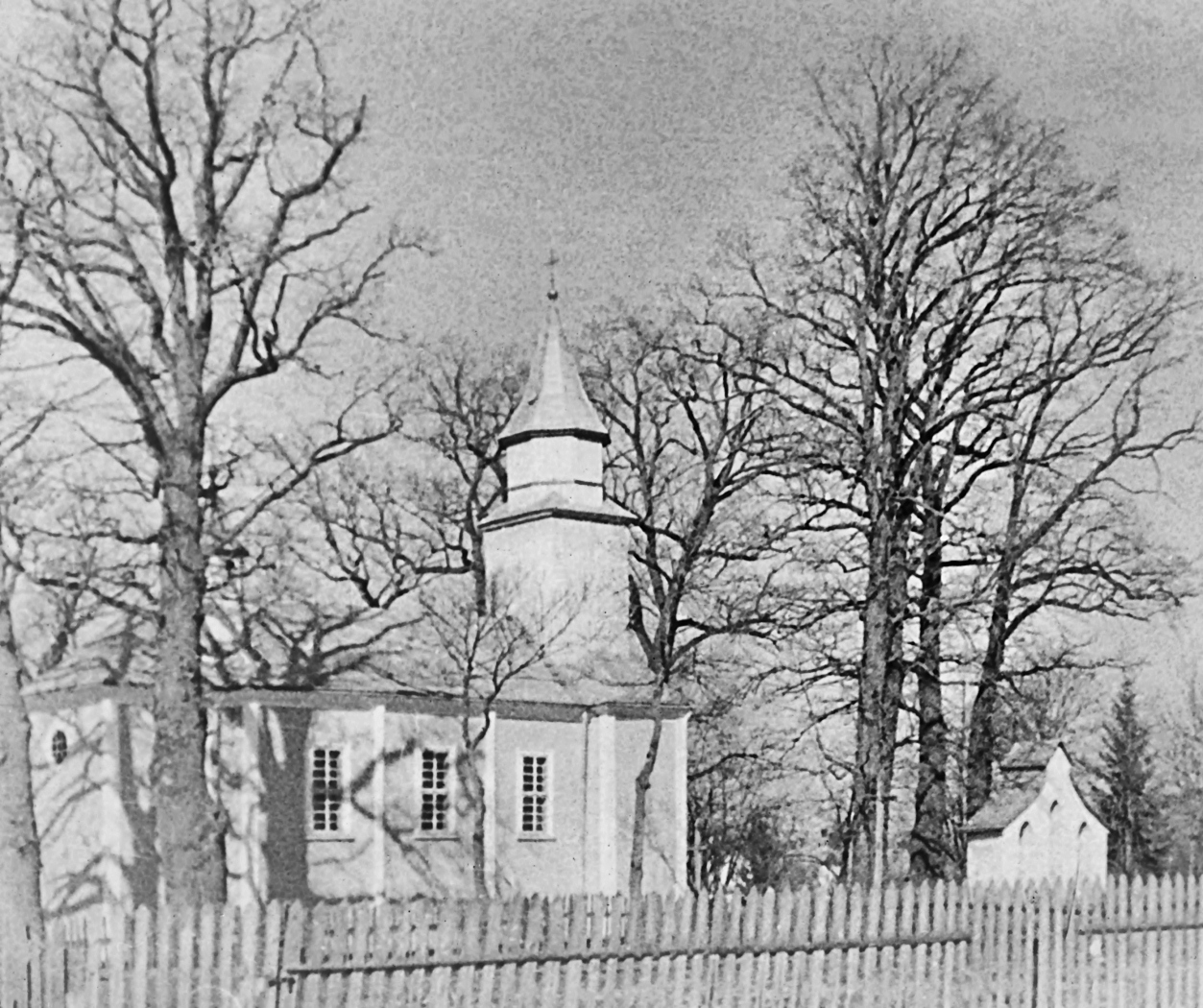
Solotvyn, parish church (Original Roman Catholic, now Greek Catholic) pictured before 1939

Solotvyn (Ukrainian: Солотвин, Polish: Sołotwina) is a rural settlement in Ivano-Frankivsk Raion of Ivano-Frankivsk Oblast, 40 km from Ivano-Frankivsk. Solotvyn hosts the administration of Solotvyn settlement hromada, one of the hromadas of Ukraine. Its estimated population was 3,692 (2022 estimate).

Solotvyn is on the Bystrytsia Solotvynska, the left of the two long headstreams of the Bystrytsia River (a tributary of the Dniester), at the foot of the Carpathian Mountains. In the seventeenth century it was named Krasnopil.

== History ==
Until 18 July 2020, Solotvyn belonged to Bohorodchany Raion. The raion was abolished in July 2020 as part of the administrative reform of Ukraine, which reduced the number of raions of Ivano-Frankivsk Oblast to six. The area of Bohorodchany Raion was merged into Ivano-Frankivsk Raion.

Until 26 January 2024, Solotvyn was designated urban-type settlement. On this day, a new law entered into force which abolished this status, and Solotvyn became a rural settlement.
