= Bohorodchany settlement hromada =

Hromada in Ivano-Frankivsk Oblast, Ukraine

Bohorodchany settlement hromada Богородчанська селищна громада
- hromada
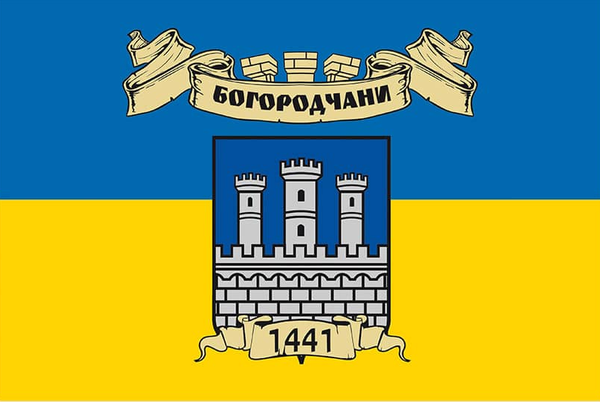
- Flag

- Location within Ivano-Frankivsk Oblast Location within Ukraine
- Coordinates: 48°48′00″N 24°32′00″E
- Country: Ukraine
- Oblast: Ivano-Frankivsk Oblast
- Raion: Ivano-Frankivsk Raion
- Administrative center: Bohorodchany

Area
  - Total: 2,555 km^{2} (986 sq mi)

Population (2020)
  - Total: 28,452
- Rural settlement: 1
- Villages: 16
- Website: bogo-rada.gov.ua

Bohorodchany settlement hromada (Ukrainian: Богородчанська селищна громада) is a hromada in Ukraine, in Ivano-Frankivsk Raion of Ivano-Frankivsk Oblast. The administrative center is the rural settlement of Bohorodchany.

== Settlements ==
The hromada consists of 1 rural settlement (Bohorodchany) and 16 villages:

- Hlybivka
- Hlyboke
- Horokholyna
- Horokholyn Lis
- Hrabovets
- Dibrova
- Zhuraky
- Zaberezhzhia
- Ivanykivka
- Kopachivka
- Lastivtsi
- Pidhiria
- Pokhivka
- Sadzhava
- Starunia
- Khmelivka
