= Pomoriany =

Rural locality in Lviv Oblast, Ukraine

Pomoriany Поморяни
- Rural settlement
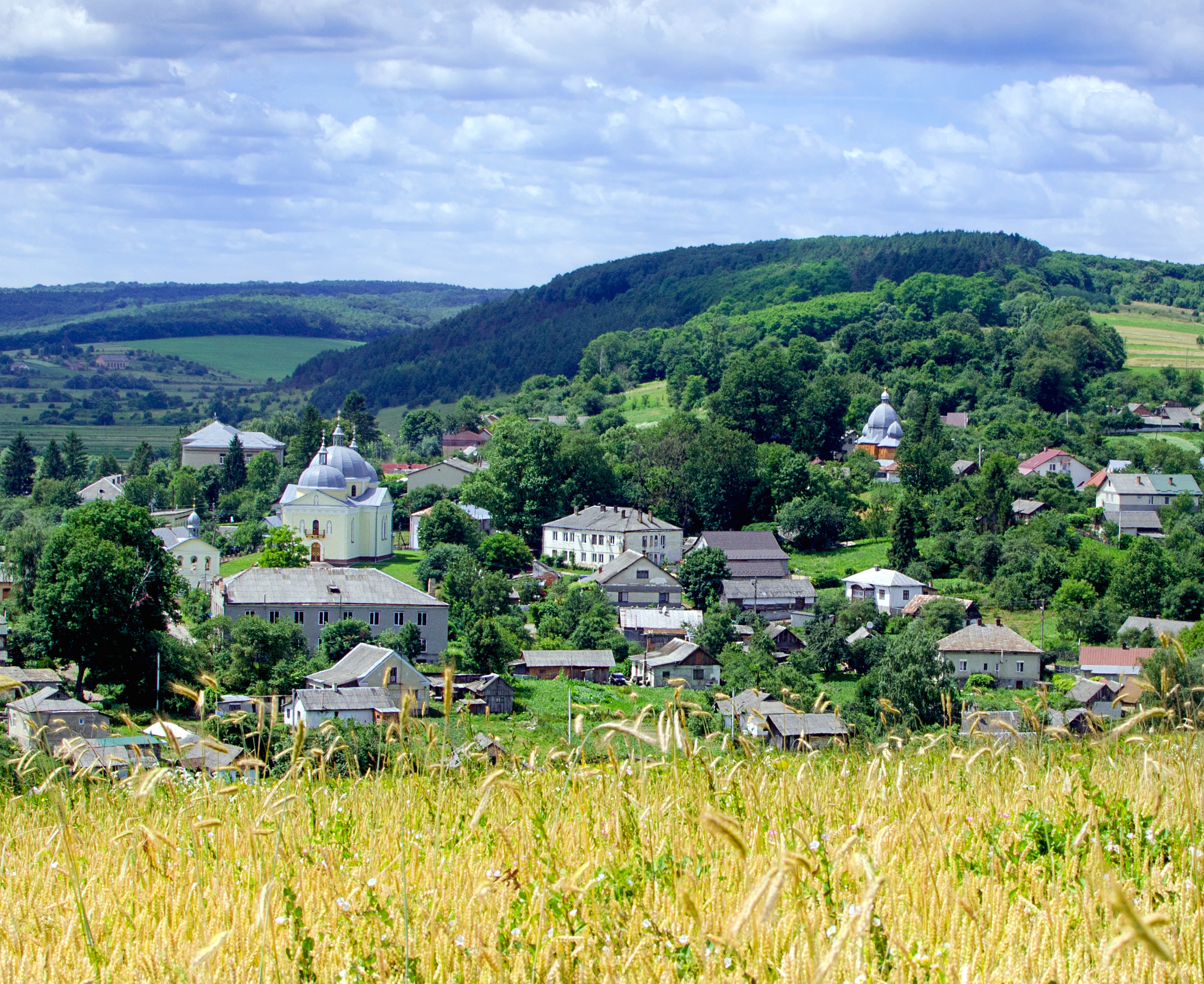

- Location within Ukraine Location within Lviv Oblast
- Coordinates: 49°38′37″N 24°55′57″E
- Ukraine: Ukraine
- Oblast: Lviv Oblast
- Raion: Zolochiv Raion
- Hromada: Pomoriany settlement hromada
- First written mention: 1437

Population
  - Total: 1,272
- Postal code: 80761

Pomoriany (Ukrainian: Поморяни) is a rural settlement in Zolochiv Raion, Lviv Oblast, Ukraine. It hosts the administration of Pomoriany settlement hromada, one of the hromadas of Ukraine. Population is estimated as 1,272 (2022 estimate). The settlement is known for its castle.

== History ==
The first mentions of Pomoriany reach 14th century when the town was transferred to the ownership of Ruthenian nobles Svynka. The highest development of the town took place in the 16th–17th centuries. That time Pomoriany was the center of the Calvinist movement, subsequently blasted by the Catholic Church. The town was a prominent center of Ukrainian culture in the early twentieth century. During the Soviet industrialization town devoid of railways and enterprises gradually degraded.

Until the holocaust, Pomoriany had a large Jewish community. In the beginning of the 20th century it had around 1,910 Jews, more than one third of the total population. Many of the Jews left in the end of the 19th century and after World War I.

Until 26 January 2024, Pomoriany was designated urban-type settlement. On this day, a new law entered into force which abolished this status, and Pomoriany became a rural settlement.
