= Pomoriany settlement hromada =

Settlement hromada in Lviv Oblast, Ukraine

Pomoriany settlement hromada Поморянська селищна громада
- Hromada
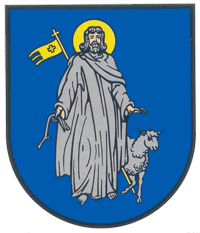
- Seal
- Interactive map of Pomoriany settlement hromada
- Coordinates: 49°38′37″N 24°55′57″E
- Country: Ukraine
- Oblast: Lviv Oblast
- Raion: Zolochiv Raion
- Admin. center: Pomoriany

Area
  - Total: 2,093 km^{2} (808 sq mi)

Population (2020)
  - Total: 7,546
  - Density: 3.605/km^{2} (9.338/sq mi)
- CATOTTG code: UA46040130000035029
- Settlements: 21
- Rural settlements: 1
- Villages: 20
- Website: pomoryanska-gromada.gov.ua

Pomoriany settlement territorial hromada (Ukrainian: Поморянська територіальна громада, romanized: Pomorianska selyshchna terytorialna hromada) is a hromada in Ukraine, in Zolochiv Raion of Lviv Oblast. The administrative center is the rural settlement of Pomoriany. Its population is 7 546 (2020 est.).

== Settlements ==
The hromada consists of 1 rural settlement (Pomoriany) and 20 villages:

- Bibshchany
- Bohutyn
- Zhukiv
- Zahora
- Koropets
- Koropchyk
- Krasnosiltsi
- Kropyvna
- Kulby
- Makhnivtsi
- Nadilne
- Nestiuky
- Pidhiria
- Poliany
- Remezivtsi
- Rozdorizhne
- Snovychi
- Torhiv
- Chyzhiv
- Shpykolosy
