= Dzvyniach rural hromada =

Hromada in Ivano-Frankivsk Oblast, Ukraine

Dzvyniach rural hromada Дзвиняцька сільська громада
- hromada
- Location within Ivano-Frankivsk Oblast Location within Ukraine
- Coordinates: 48°44′46″N 24°25′40″E
- Country: Ukraine
- Oblast: Ivano-Frankivsk Oblast
- Raion: Ivano-Frankivsk Raion
- Administrative center: Dzvyniach

Area
  - Total: 80 km^{2} (31 sq mi)

Population
  - Total: 8,291
- Villages: 5
- Website: dzvynyacka-gromada.gov.ua

Dzvyniach rural hromada (Ukrainian: Дзвиняцька сільська громада) is a hromada in Ukraine, in Ivano-Frankivsk Raion of Ivano-Frankivsk Oblast. The administrative center is the village of Dzvyniach.

== Settlements ==
The hromada consists of 5 villages:

- Dzvyniach
- Kosmach
- Lukvytsia
- Mizhhiria
- Rosilna
