= Porohy =

Rural locality in Ivano-Frankivsk Oblast, Ukraine

Porohy Пороги
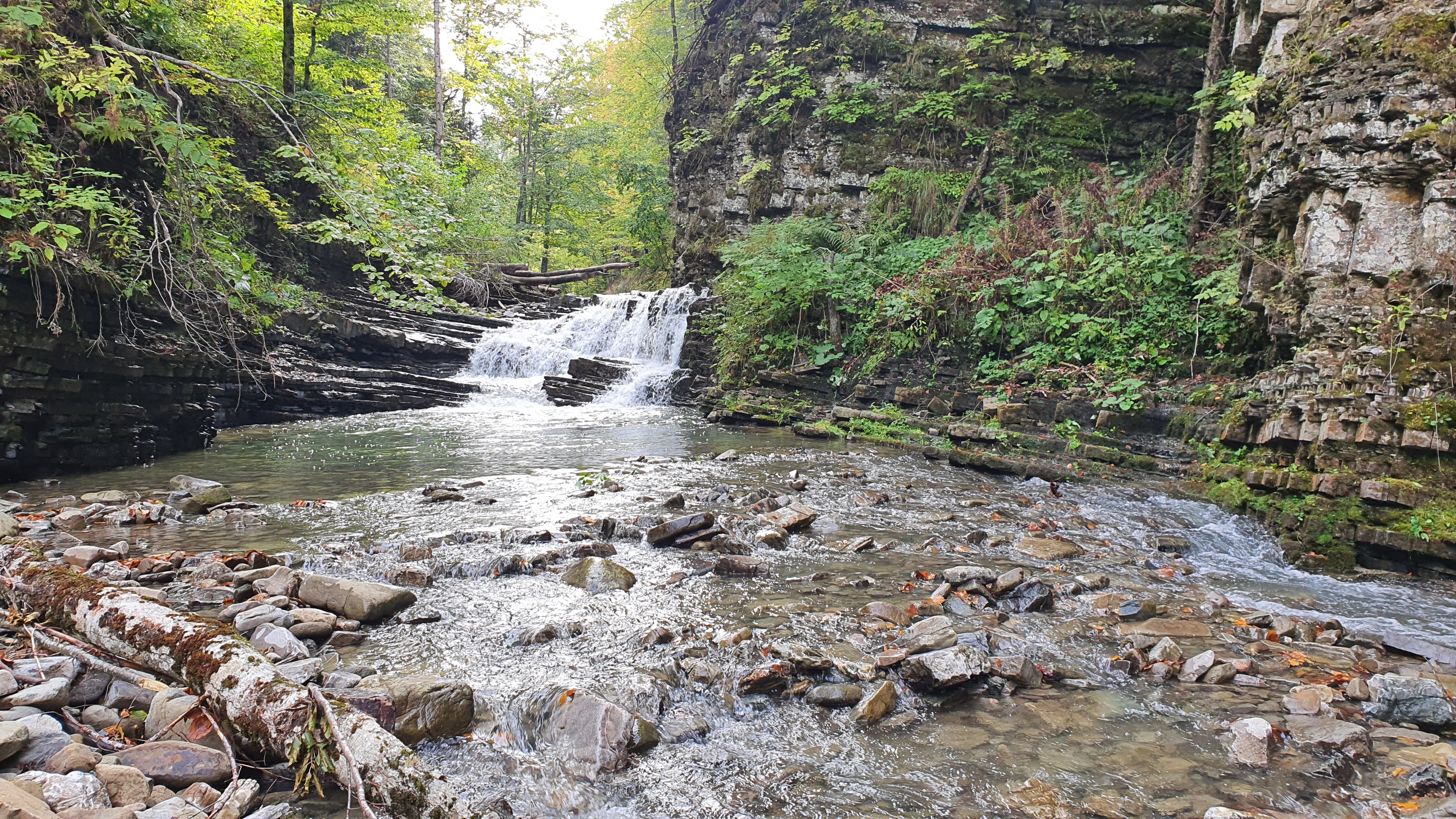
- A waterfall in Porohy

- Location in Ivano-Frankivsk Oblast
- Coordinates: 48°40′59″N 24°15′1″E
- Country: Ukraine
- Oblast: Ivano-Frankivsk Oblast
- Raion: Ivano-Frankivsk Raion
- Hromada: Solotvyn settlement hromada
- Time zone: UTC+2 (EET)
  - Summer (DST): UTC+3 (EEST)
- Postal code: 77743

Porohy (Ukrainian: Пороги) is a village in the Solotvyn settlement hromada of the Ivano-Frankivsk Raion of Ivano-Frankivsk Oblast in Ukraine.

== History ==
The village is known from 1596.

After the liquidation of the Bohorodchany Raion on 19 July 2020, the village became part of the Ivano-Frankivsk Raion.

== Religion ==
- Church of the Transfiguration (1934, brick, UGCC).

== Notable residents ==
- Modest Sosenko (1875–1920), Ukrainian painter and monumental artist

In the village lived and worked Theodora Kobylianska, who was visited by the writer Iryna Vilde.

== Sources ==
- "Porohy z Hutą". Geographical Dictionary of the Kingdom of Poland (in Polish). 8. Warszawa: Kasa im. Józefa Mianowskiego. 1887. p. 823.
