= Starunia =

Rural locality in Ivano-Frankivsk Oblast, Ukraine

Coordinates: 48°42′38″N 24°29′29″E

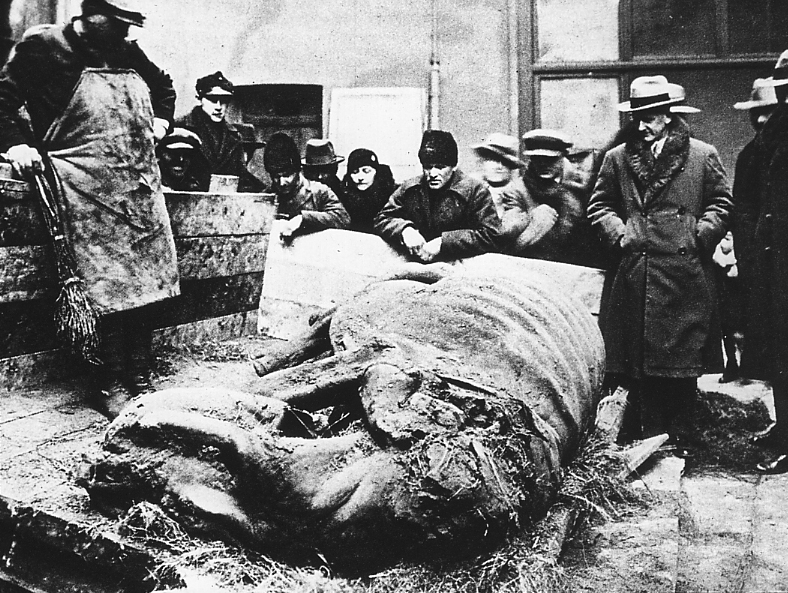
Woolly Rhinoceros (Coelodonta antiquitatis) (jr synonym=Diserorhinus antiquitatis), carcass with skin, as found in asphalt deposits in Starunia Oil Field, Poland (modern Ukraine), 1929.

Starunya or Starunia (Ukrainian: Стару́ня) is a village in Ivano-Frankivsk Raion, Ivano-Frankivsk Oblast, Ukraine. It belongs to Bohorodchany settlement hromada, one of the hromadas of Ukraine.

Until 18 July 2020, Starunia belonged to Bohorodchany Raion. The raion was abolished in July 2020 as part of the administrative reform of Ukraine, which reduced the number of raions of Ivano-Frankivsk Oblast to six. The area of Bohorodchany Raion was merged into Ivano-Frankivsk Raion.
