= Dominik Potocki =

Polish noble

Dominik Potocki (c. 1646 – 14 December 1683) was a Polish nobleman of the Potocki family and politician, Treasurer of the Crown Court. He was married to Konstancja Truskolaska, daughter of Mikołaj Truskolaski, chamberlain of Halicz. His son was Jakub Potocki.
