= Modest Sosenko =

Ukrainian artist (1875–1920)

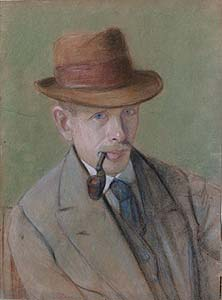
Modest Sosenko, Self-portrait 1915

Modest Danylovych Sosenko (Ukrainian: Модест Данилович Сосенко; 28 April 1875 — 4 February 1920) was a Ukrainian painter and monumental artist.

== Life ==
Modest Sosenko was born in the village of Porohy of the Austrian Crown lands Kingdom of Galicia and Lodomeria, in present-day Ivano-Frankivsk Raion of Ukraine, into the family of a priest. With the financial support of Metropolitan Andrey Sheptytsky, he studied at the Jan Matejko Academy of Fine Arts in Kraków from 1896 to 1900, at the Academy of Fine Arts in Munich in 1901 and 1902, and at the École nationale supérieure des arts décoratifs in Paris from 1902 to 1905. He lived in Lviv from 1906, but travelled frequently to Italy in the years between 1908 and 1913, visited the Russian Ukraine in 1913, and Egypt and Palestine in 1914. Between 1916 and 1918, he served as a soldier in the Austrian army on the front lines of World War I.

Sosenko painted portraits, genre scenes, murals, iconostases and church paintings. In the latter, he combined traditional Byzantine art with modern artistic approaches, making him a pioneer of Boychukism. He died in Lviv at the age of 44 and was buried there in the Janiwskyj cemetery.

== See also ==
- Liubov Voloshyn
