= Stanisławów Voivodeship =

Former voivodeship of Poland

Coordinates: 48°55′24″N 24°42′37″E

Stanisławów Voivodeship Województwo stanisławowskie
- Voivodeship of Poland
- 1920–1939
- Coat of arms

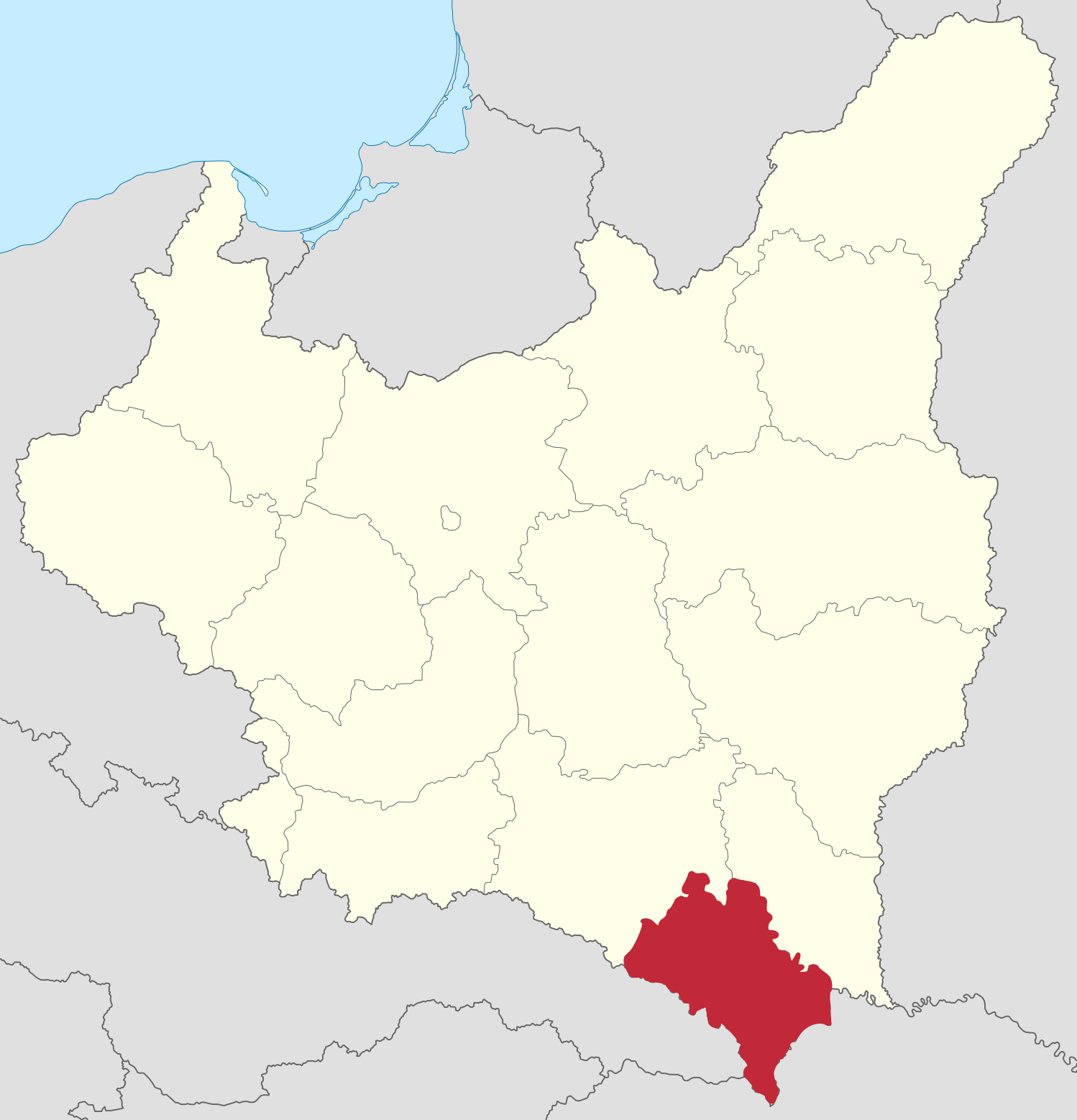
- Location of Stanisławów Voivodeship (red) within the Second Republic of Poland (1938).
- Capital: Stanisławów
- Area
  - 1921: 18,368 km^{2} (7,092 sq mi)
  - 1939: 16,894 km^{2} (6,523 sq mi)
- Population
  - 1921: 1,348,580
  - 1931: 1,480,300
- Government
  - Type: Voivodeship
- Voivodes
  - 1921–1925: Edmund Jurystowski
  - Jan–Sep 1939: Stanisław Jarecki
- Historical era: Interwar period
  - Established: 23 December 1920
  - Soviet invasion: 17 September 1939
  - replaced with Stanislav Oblast, Ukrainian SSR: 27 November 1939
- Political subdivisions: 15 powiats
Preceded by	Succeeded by
Kingdom of Galicia and Lodomeria	Ivano-Frankivsk Oblast

Stanisławów Voivodeship (Polish: Województwo stanisławowskie) was an administrative district of the Second Polish Republic (1918–1945). It was established in December 1920 with an administrative center in Stanisławów. The voivodeship had an area of 16,900 km^{2} and comprised twelve counties (powiaty). Following World War II, at the insistence of Joseph Stalin during the Tehran Conference of 1943, Poland's borders were redrawn, Polish population forcibly resettled and Stanisławów Voivodeship was incorporated into the Ukrainian Soviet Socialist Republic as Stanislav Oblast (later renamed as Ivano-Frankivsk Oblast).

== September 1939 and its aftermath ==
Following German invasion on Poland, and in accordance with the secret protocol of the Molotov–Ribbentrop Pact, Soviet forces invaded eastern Poland on September 17, 1939. As bulk of the Polish Army was concentrated in the west, fighting Germans, the Soviets met with little resistance and their troops quickly moved westwards. Polish authorities originally intended to organize anti-German resistance in Stanisławów Voivodeship (see: Romanian Bridgehead), with Polish Army units planning to stand ground until the spring of 1940 when a French attack on Germany was expected. However, the Soviet invasion of Poland rendered these plans ineffectual. It is estimated that prior to Soviet counter-offensive in the latter part of World War II, over 18,000 Polish civilians in Stanisławów Voivodeship fell victims to OUN-UPA massacres.

== Demographics ==
The Voivodeship's capital was Stanisławów (now Ivano-Frankivsk in Ukraine). In 1921 was inhabited by 1,339,191 people, and its population density was 72.9 persons per km^{2}. Ukrainians and Ruthenians constituted 70% of the population, especially in the countryside. Poles, distributed across the entire voivodeship, made around 22%, Polish Jews (mainly in towns), around 7%. Also, there were smaller communities of Galician Germans. In 1931 the population grew to 1,480,285 and the density to 88 persons per km^{2}.

According to the census of 1921 the Stanisławów Voivodeship was inhabited by 1,339,191 people, of whom by nationality 70.2% were Ruthenian (Ukrainian), 21.8% were Polish, 6.8% were Jewish, 1.1% were German and 0.1% all others. By religion 74.3% were Uniate or Orthodox, 14.3% were Roman Catholic, 0.8% were Protestant and 10.6% were Jewish.

In 1931 the voivodeship had 1,480,285 inhabitants, of whom by mother tongue 68.8% spoke Ukrainian and Ruthenian, 22.4% spoke Polish, 7.4% spoke Yiddish and Hebrew, 1.1% spoke German and 0.3% spoke other languages. By religion 73% were Greek Catholic and Orthodox, 16.6% were Roman Catholic, 0.8% were Protestant, 9.4% were Jewish and 0.2% were others.

The results of the 1931 census (questions about mother tongue and about religion) are presented in the table below:

Comparison of Polish and Ukrainian population of Stanisławów Voivodeship according to the 1931 census
County Polish name	County	Pop.	Polish	%	Ukrainian & Ruthenian	%	Roman Catholic	%	Uniate & Orthodox	%
Dolina	Dolyna	118373	21158	17.9%	83880	70.9%	15630	13.2%	89811	75.9%
Horodenka	Horodenka	92894	27751	29.9%	59957	64.5%	15519	16.7%	69789	75.1%
Kałusz	Kalush	102252	18637	18.2%	77506	75.8%	14418	14.1%	80750	79.0%
Kołomyja	Kolomyia	176000	52006	29.5%	110533	62.8%	31925	18.1%	121376	69.0%
Kosów	Kosiv	93952	6718	7.2%	79838	85.0%	4976	5.3%	80903	86.1%
Nadwórna	Nadwórna County	140702	16907	12.0%	112128	79.7%	15214	10.8%	113116	80.4%
Rohatyn	Rohatyn	127252	36152	28.4%	84875	66.7%	27108	21.3%	90456	71.1%
Stanisławów	Stanyslaviv	198359	49032	24.7%	120214	60.6%	42519	21.4%	123959	62.5%
Stryj	Stryi	152631	25186	16.5%	106183	69.6%	23404	15.3%	108159	70.9%
Śniatyn	Sniatyn	78025	17206	22.1%	56007	71.8%	8659	11.1%	61797	79.2%
Tłumacz	Tlumach	116028	44958	38.7%	66659	57.5%	31478	27.1%	76650	66.1%
Żydaczów	Zhydachiv	83817	16464	19.6%	61098	72.9%	15094	18.0%	63144	75.3%
Województwo Stanisławowskie	Stanisławów Voivodeship	1480285	332175	22.4%	1018878	68.8%	245944	16.6%	1079910	73.0%

== Geography ==
The Stanisławów Voivodeship's area was 16,894 square kilometers. It was located in south-eastern corner of the country, bordering Tarnopol Voivodeship to the northeast, Lwów Voivodeship to the west, Czechoslovakia (Between 1919 and 1938), Hungary (Between 1938 and 1939) and Romania to the south. It was in large part covered by forests of the Carpathian Mountains, with numerous mountain spas (Worochta, Skole, Dolina, Żabie, Sławsko, Woronienka, Jaremcza, Kuty). The landscape was hilly (in the north) and mountainous (in the south), with Hoverla in the Chornohora range as the highest peak (2060 meters above sea level). The other significant mountain range was the Gorgany.

The main river was the Dniester, which also marked border with the Tarnopol Voivodeship. Other rivers were: the Prut, the Stryj and the Cheremosh (the last one was at the same time bordering Poland from Romania).

== Administrative divisions ==
Before the onset of World War II the Stanisławów Voivodeship consisted of 15 powiats (counties) (earlier 12), 29 towns, 904 villages and numerous smaller communities (futory, kolonie). Those were the same 12 powiats that were part of the Kingdom of Galicia and Lodomeria with the addition of Turka powiat later on. Its capital Stanisławów was the largest city, with population of some 60,000 (as of 1931). Other important municipal centers of the voivodeship were: Kołomyja (pop. 33,800), Stryj (pop. 30,500), Horodenka (pop. 12,200), Kalusz (pop. 12,100), Sniatyn (pop. 10,800) and Bolechow (pop. 10,700).

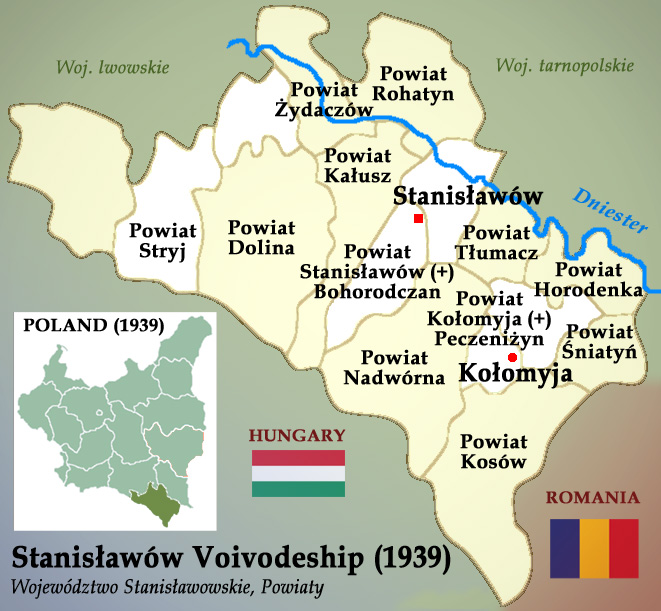
Map of Stanisławów Voivodeship with Counties

The Stanisławów Voivodeship consisted of 12 powiats (counties):

1. Dolina Powiat (2,397 km^{2})
2. Horodenka Powiat (849 km^{2})
3. Kałusz Powiat (1,137 km^{2})
4. Kołomyja Powiat (1,339 km^{2}), joined with Peczeniżyn Powiat
5. Kosów Powiat (1,839 km^{2})
6. Nadwórna Powiat (2,472 km^{2})
7. Rohatyn Powiat (1,147 km^{2})
8. Stanisławów Powiat (1,249 km^{2}), joined with Bohorodczan Powiat
9. Stryj Powiat (2,081 km^{2}), joined with Skolski Powiat
10. Śniatyń Powiat (567 km^{2})
11. Tłumacz Powiat (934 km^{2})
12. Żydaczów Powiat (883 km^{2})

== Railroads and industry ==
The Stanisławów Voivodeship was located in the so-called Poland "B" region, which meant that it was underdeveloped, with low level of industry and considerable numbers of inhabitants living in poverty. Agricultural production was low due to poor quality of soil. Since mid-1930s, the area was quickly gaining popularity as a tourist destination, with numbers of visitors to mountain springs rising steadily year by year. Railroad network was well-developed in the north, with such important junctions as Stanisławów, Kołomyja and Stryj. In the south, however, rail connections were lacking.

On January 1, 1938, total length of railroads within Voivodeship's boundaries was 755 kilometers (4.5 km. per 100 km^{2}).

== Voivodes ==
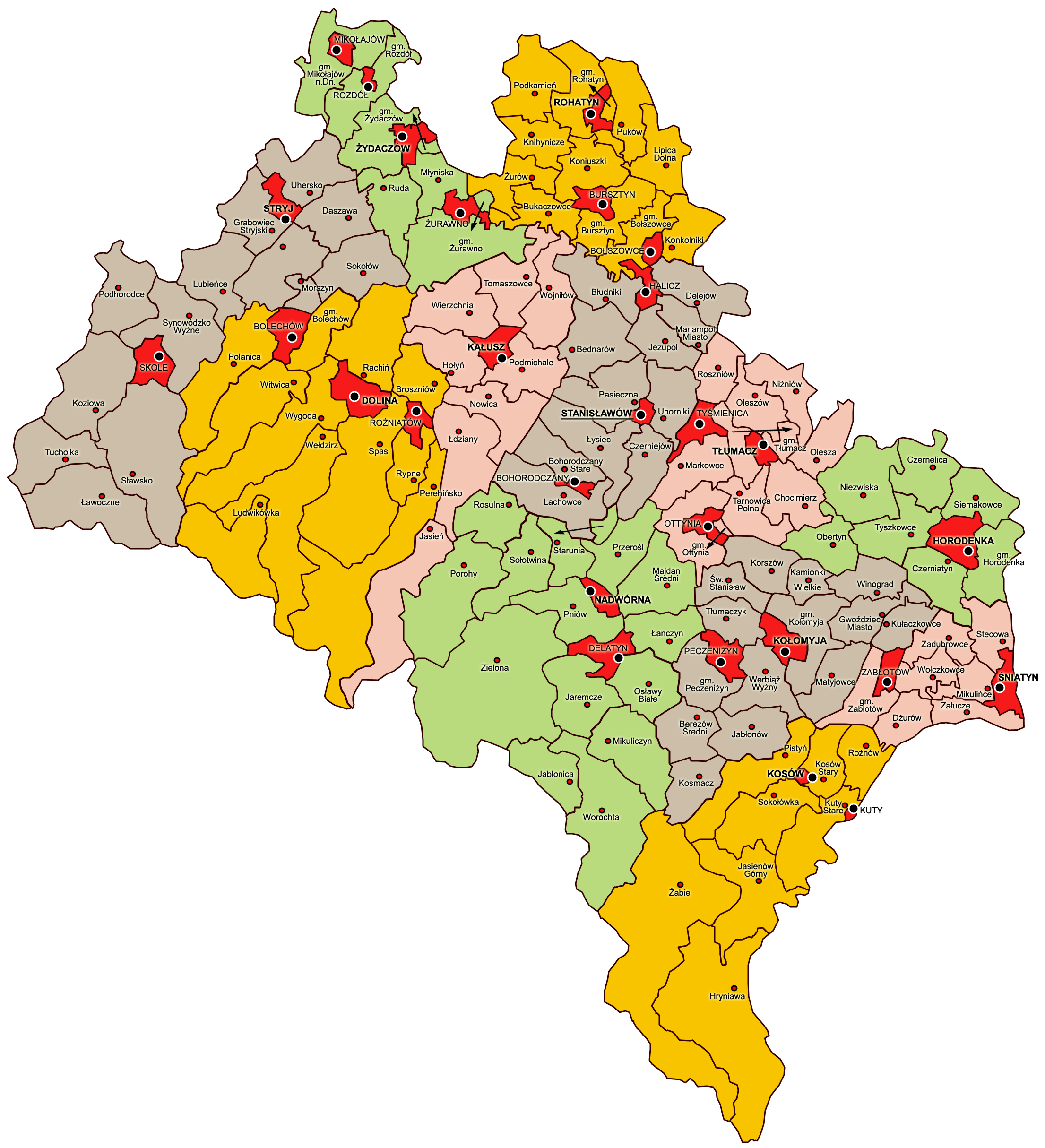
Administrative divisions, 1938

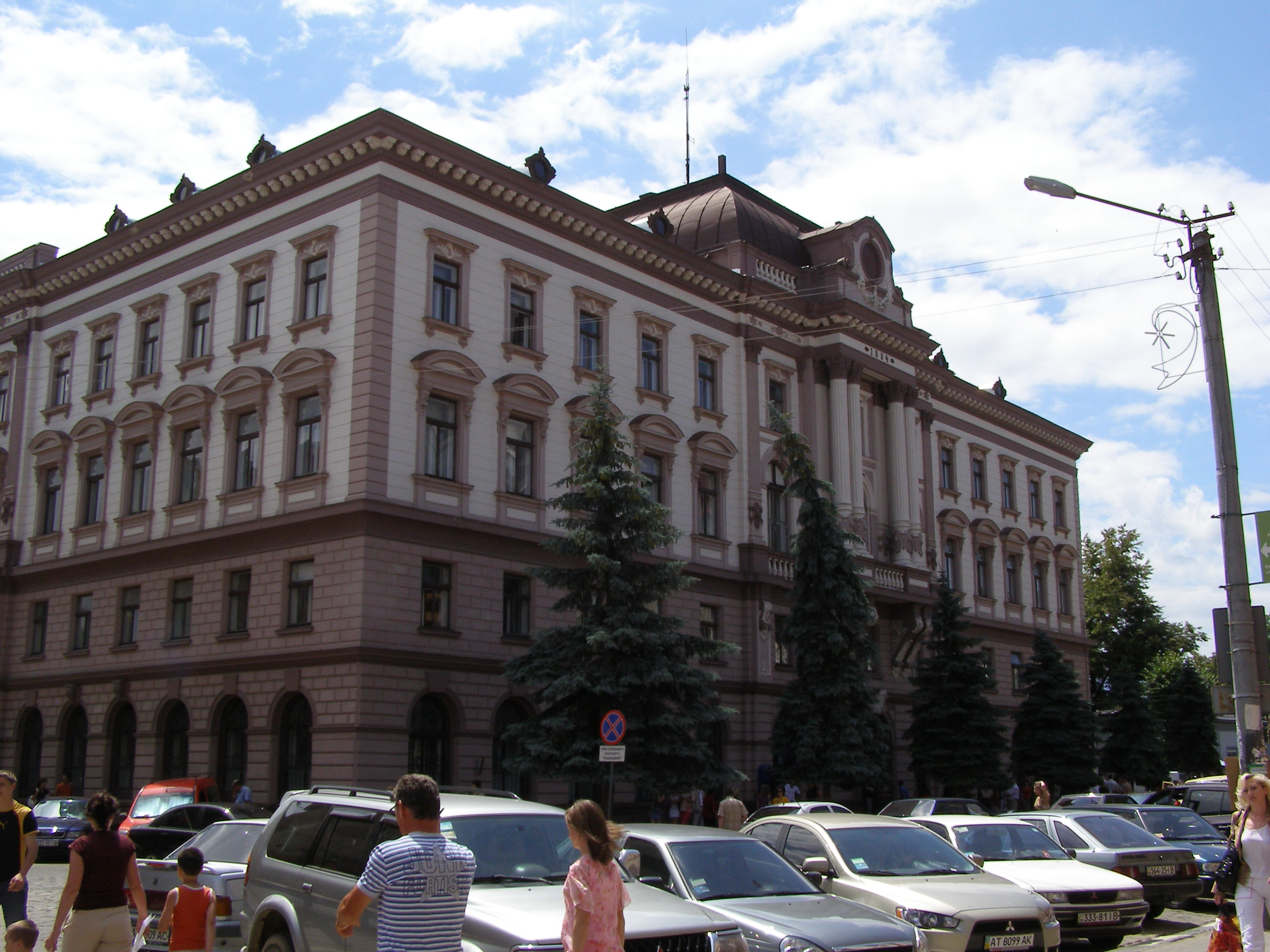
Building of the Voivodeship administration (today Medical University)

The local government of voivodeship and city was located at address Ulica Karpinskiego, 7 (today - vulytsia Halytska, 2).

- Edmund Jurystowski: 21 October 1921 – 18 August 1925
- Aleksander Des Loges: 18 August 1925 – 25 October 1926
- Władysław Korsak: 18 December 1926 – 12 September 1927
- Aleksander Morawski: 28 October 1927 – 30 October 1928
- Bronisław Nakoniecznikow-Klukowski: 30 October 1928 – 29 August 1930
- Zygmunt Jagodziński: 3 September 1930 – 1 February 1936 (acting until 2 February 1931)
- Mieczysław Starzyński: 11 February 1936 – 22 June 1936 (acting )
- Jan Sawicki: 23 June 1936 – July 1936
- Stefan Pasławski: 14 July 1936 – 20 January 1939
- Stanisław Jarecki: 20 January 1939 – 2 September 1939

Following Soviet invasion of Poland on 17 September 1939, the voivodeship existed until 27 November 1939. On 6 October 1939 – 27 November 1939 the voivodeship was governed by Soviet provisional chairman of Civilian Administration Mikhail Grulenko who later continued to hold his post as the 1st secretary of the CPU in the region.

== See also ==
- Podolia
- Biały Słoń
