= Dzvyniach, Ivano-Frankivsk Oblast =

Village in Ivano-Frankivsk Oblast, Ukraine

Dzvyniach Дзвиняч
- Village
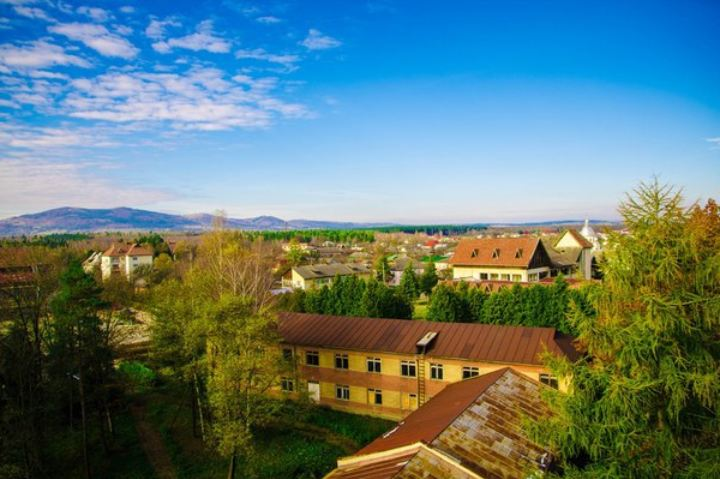

- Location of Dzvyniach in Ivano-Frankivsk Oblast Location of Dzvyniach in Ukraine
- Coordinates: 48°44′46″N 24°25′40″E
- Country: Ukraine
- Oblast: Ivano-Frankivsk Oblast
- Raion: Ivano-Frankivsk Raion
- First mentioned: 1450

Dzvyniach (Ukrainian: Дзвиняч; Polish: Dźwiniacz) is a village in Ivano-Frankivsk Oblast, Ukraine, in Ivano-Frankivsk Raion. It is the administrative centre of the Dzvyniach rural hromada.

== History ==
Dzvyniach was first mentioned in 1450 as part of a court case between two members of the szlachta. As a result of the case, the population of Dzvyniach was required to pay tithe from their beekeeping operations, as well as a tenth of their agricultural harvest. During the Khmelnytsky Uprising, residents of Dzvyniach fought under Semen Vysochan. The village is also economically sustained by the Solotvyn salt mine and local ozokerite mines, established by Austrian industrialists in the 19th century.

== Notable residents ==
- Mykhailo Stepaniak, Ukrainian Insurgent Army commander
- Andriy Karabinovych, junior sergeant of the Special Police Forces of Ukraine
