= Uchan-su =

Uchan-su can refer to:

- Uchan-su (river), the river that flows through Crimea
- Uchan-su (waterfall), the waterfall in Crimea
