= Shypit =

Waterfall in Ukraine

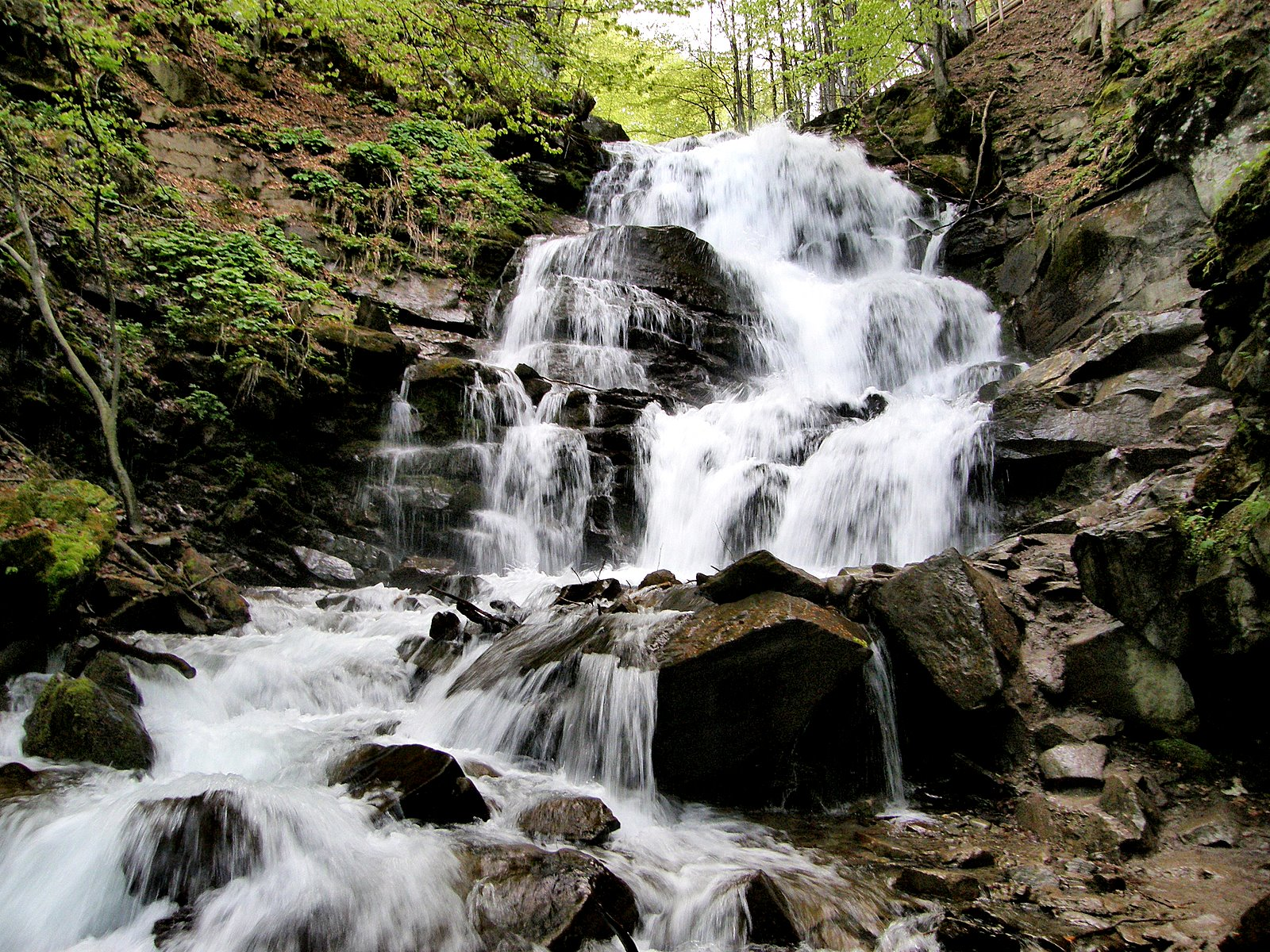

- Location within Zakarpattia Oblast Location within Ukraine
- Location: Mizhhiria Raion, Zakarpattia Oblast, Ukraine
- Coordinates: 48°39′16″N 23°16′16″E
- Elevation: 744 metres (2,441 ft)
- Total height: 14 metres (46 ft)
- Watercourse: Pylypets river

Shypit (Ukrainian: Шипіт, lit. 'Sizzle') is a waterfall located on the Pylypets River. It is about 6 kilometres (3.7 mi) from the village of Pylypets, Mizhhiria Raion, Zakarpattia Oblast of western Ukraine. The waterfall is 15 metres (49 ft) high.

== See also ==
- The legend of the waterfall Shypit
- List of waterfalls
- Waterfalls of Ukraine
- http://www.turystam.in.ua/en/ 1 and 2
