= Chernytskyi =

Waterfall in Ukraine

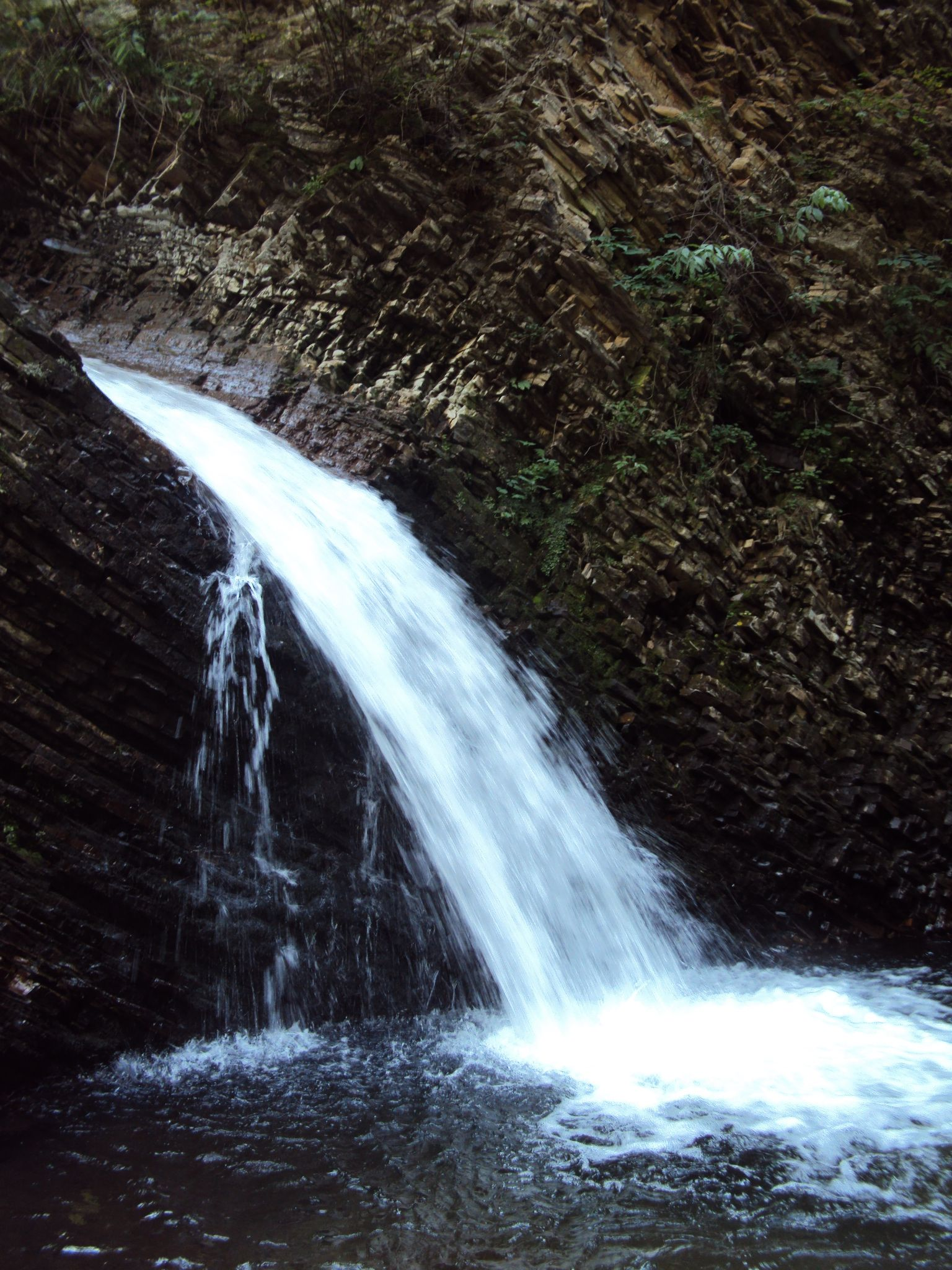

- Location within Ivano-Frankivsk Oblast Location within Ukraine
- Location: Nadvirna Raion, Ivano-Frankivsk Oblast, Ukraine
- Coordinates: 48°29′54″N 24°21′34″E
- Total height: 8 metres (26 ft)
- Watercourse: Chernyk (river)

The Chernytskyi waterfall (Ukrainian: Черницький водоспад) is located on the Chernyk river in Chernyk village, Nadvirna Raion, Ivano-Frankivsk Oblast. Waterfall height is 8 metres (26 ft).

== See also ==
- Waterfalls of Ukraine
