= Pylypets =

Village in Zakarpattia Oblast, Ukraine

Pylypets Пилипець
- Village
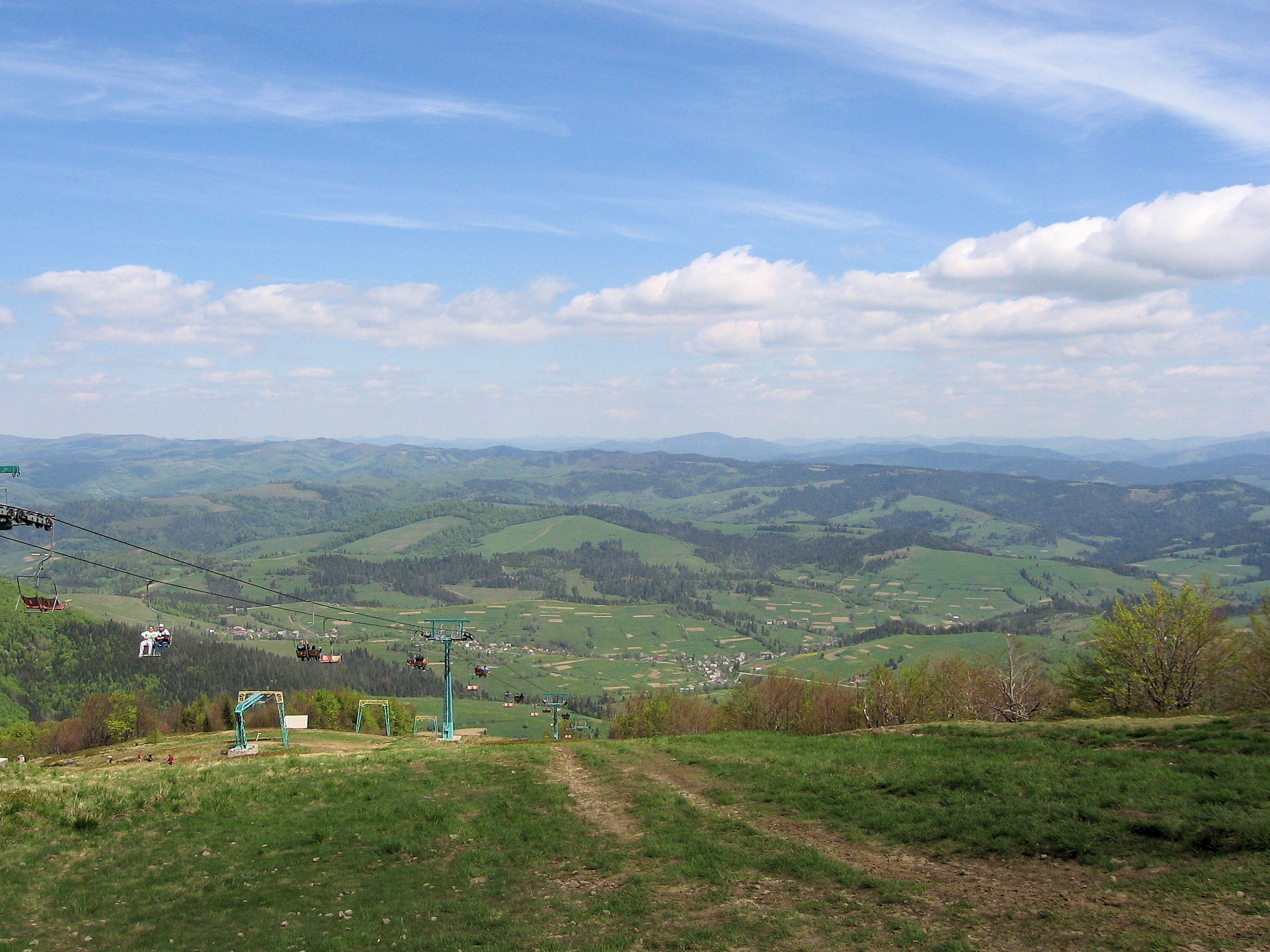
- View of Pylypets

- Location in Zakarpattia Oblast Location in Ukraine
- Country: Ukraine
- Oblast: Zakarpattia Oblast
- Raion: Khust Raion

Population (2001)
  - Total: 1,094
- Time zone: UTC+2 (EET)
  - Summer (DST): UTC+3 (EEST)

Pylypets (Ukrainian: Пилипець) is a village located in Khust Raion of Zakarpattia Oblast in Ukraine.

== History ==
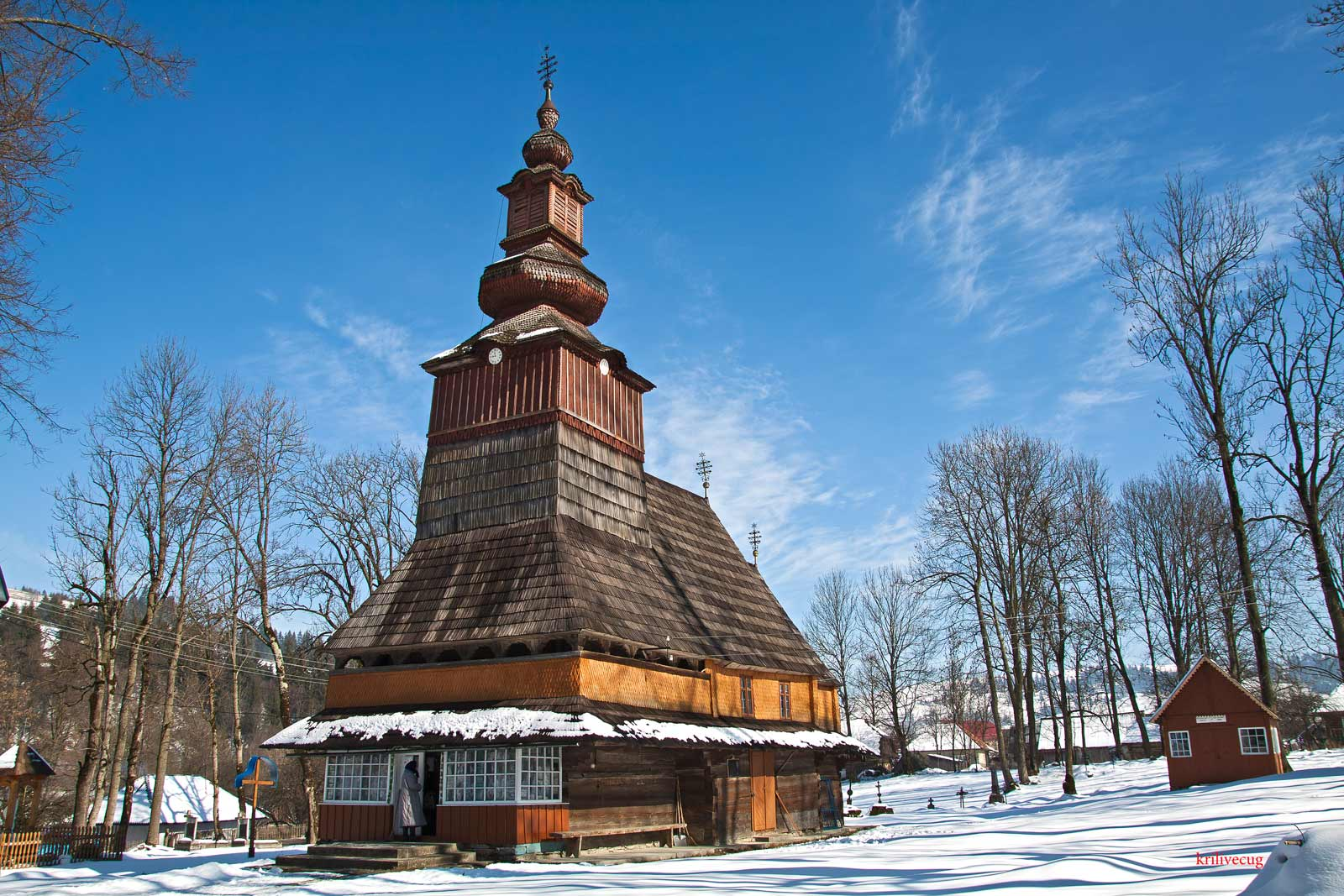
Wintery view of the Church of the Virgin

Pylypets was first mentioned in Hungarian written sources in 1463 under the name of Verelepets, which was founded by fugitive settlers from lower-lying villages who wanted to escape persecution by their feudal lords. According to legend, the current name of the village derives from a shepherd named Philip, who first settled here.

Before 1919, the village was located in the Lands of the Crown of Saint Stephen of the Austro-Hungarian Empire. During World War I, in October 1914, the village was briefly occupied by the Imperial Russian Army. After the war, it was briefly part of the Hungarian Soviet Republic. At the beginning of April 1919, a Soviet Council was elected in Pylynka, which, however, only existed until the village was taken by Romanian troops during the Hungarian–Romanian War at the end of the month. After the Paris Peace Conference, the village was annexed by Czechoslovakia as part of Subcarpathian Ruthenia. On 15 March 1939, the village was occupied by Hungarian troops and annexed by Hungary until it was captured by troops of the 4th Ukrainian Front of the Red Army on 11 October 1944. After World War II, the local area became part of the Ukrainian Soviet Socialist Republic in 1946 within the Soviet Union. After its dissolution, Pylypets became part of independent Ukraine in 1991.

Until 18 July 2020, Pylypets belonged to Mizhhiria Raion. The raion was abolished in July 2020 as part of the administrative reform of Ukraine, which reduced the number of raions of Zakarpattia Oblast to six. The area of Mizhhiria Raion was merged into Khust Raion.

== Demographics ==
Native language as of the Ukrainian Census of 2001:

- Ukrainian 99.64%
- Russian 0.36%

== Tourism ==
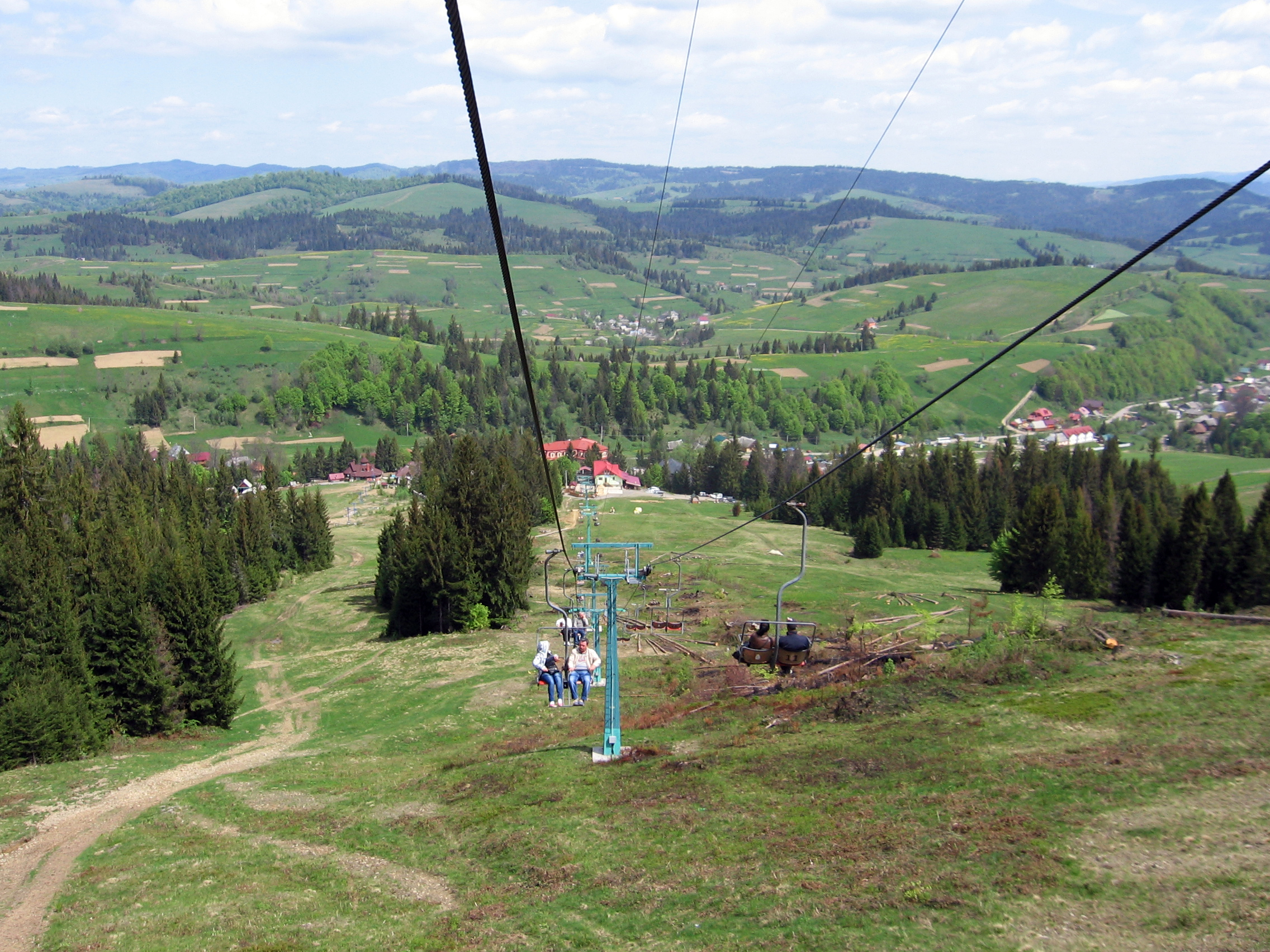
Ski lift in Summer

In Pylypets, there is a winter sports resort with three ski lifts and a total length of more than 20,000 m (66,000 ft). The longest descent is at 1,497 m (4,911 ft) high Hymba (Гимба) and has a length of 4,000 m (13,000 ft). During the Summer months, the village is a starting point for hiking tourists and a paragliding center.

The eighteenth-century wooden Church of the Nativity of the Blessed Virgin Mary is an architectural monument. In the vicinity of the village is the 14 m (46 ft) high Shypit waterfall and a mineral water spring with a high iron content, the water of which is suitable for treating heart, vascular and digestive ailments.
