= Maniava waterfall =

Maniava
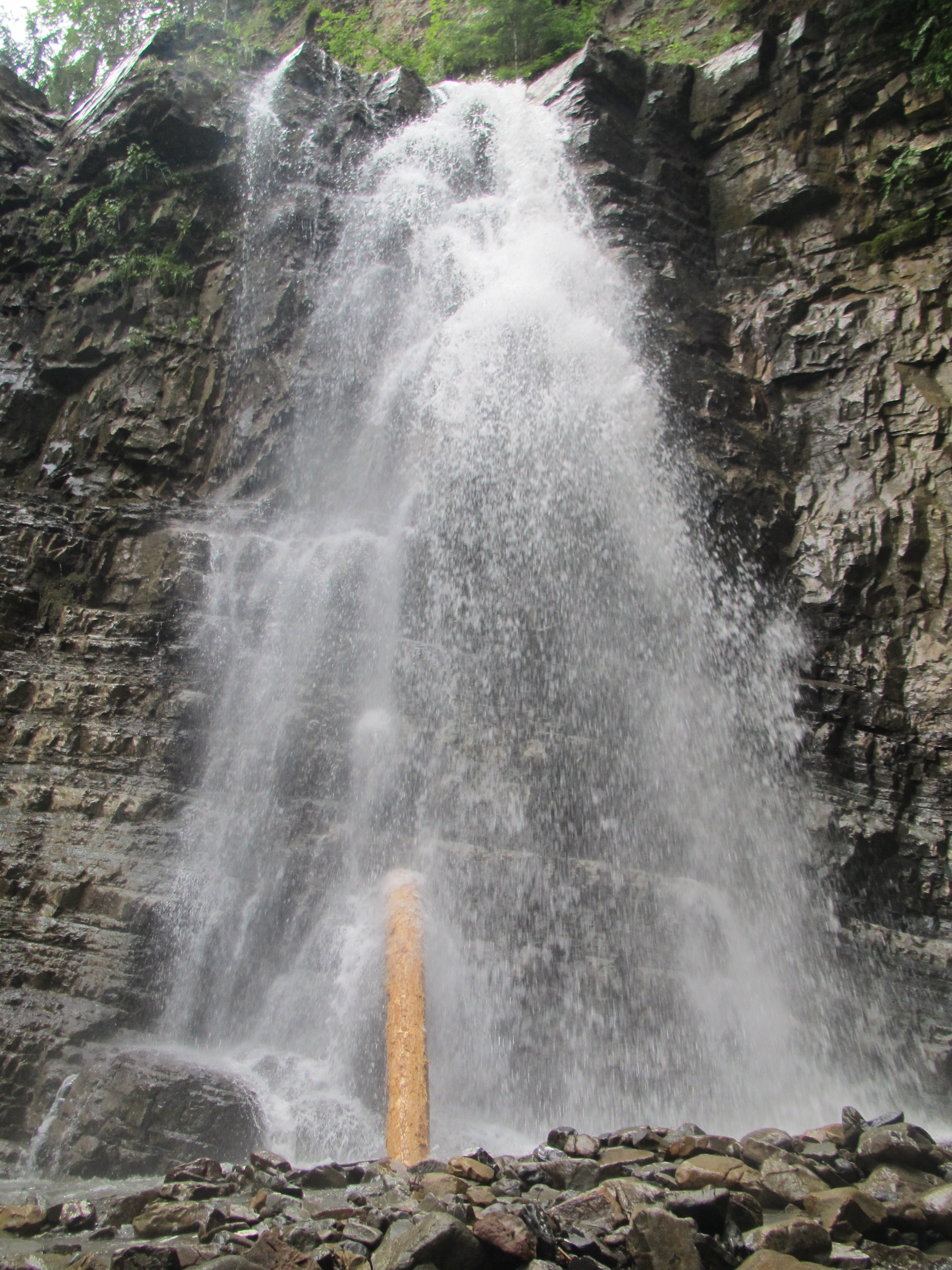

- Location within Ivano-Frankivsk Oblast Location within Ukraine
- Location: Ivano-Frankivsk Raion, Ivano-Frankivsk Oblast, Ukraine
- Coordinates: 48°37′32″N 24°18′13″E
- Total height: 20 metres (66 ft)
- Watercourse: Maniavka (river)

The Maniava waterfall (Ukrainian: Манявський водоспад) is one of the highest waterfalls in the Ukrainian Carpathians and is located in the Gorgany mountain ridge in Ukraine.

== Geography ==
Maniava waterfall is located on the Maniavka river, about 8 kilometres (5.0 mi) south of Maniava, Ivano-Frankivsk Raion, Ivano-Frankivsk Oblast.

Its height is nearly 20 metres (66 ft). Near the waterfall there is a canyon that is approximately 200 metres (660 ft) long with rocks up to 20 metres (66 ft) high. The water falls down the flysch formations.

== Overview ==
The waterfall also boasts a small lake, where the water remains cool even in hot season. Fir and beech forests line the waterfall creating a very beautiful and tranquil environment. The waterfall turns a little wild following heavy rainfall or the monsoon with frequent flash floods. In winter months frozen icicles look like chimeras with an enchanting effect on the visitors who frequent the place.

== See also ==
- List of waterfalls
- Waterfalls of Ukraine
