= List of waterfalls in Ukraine =

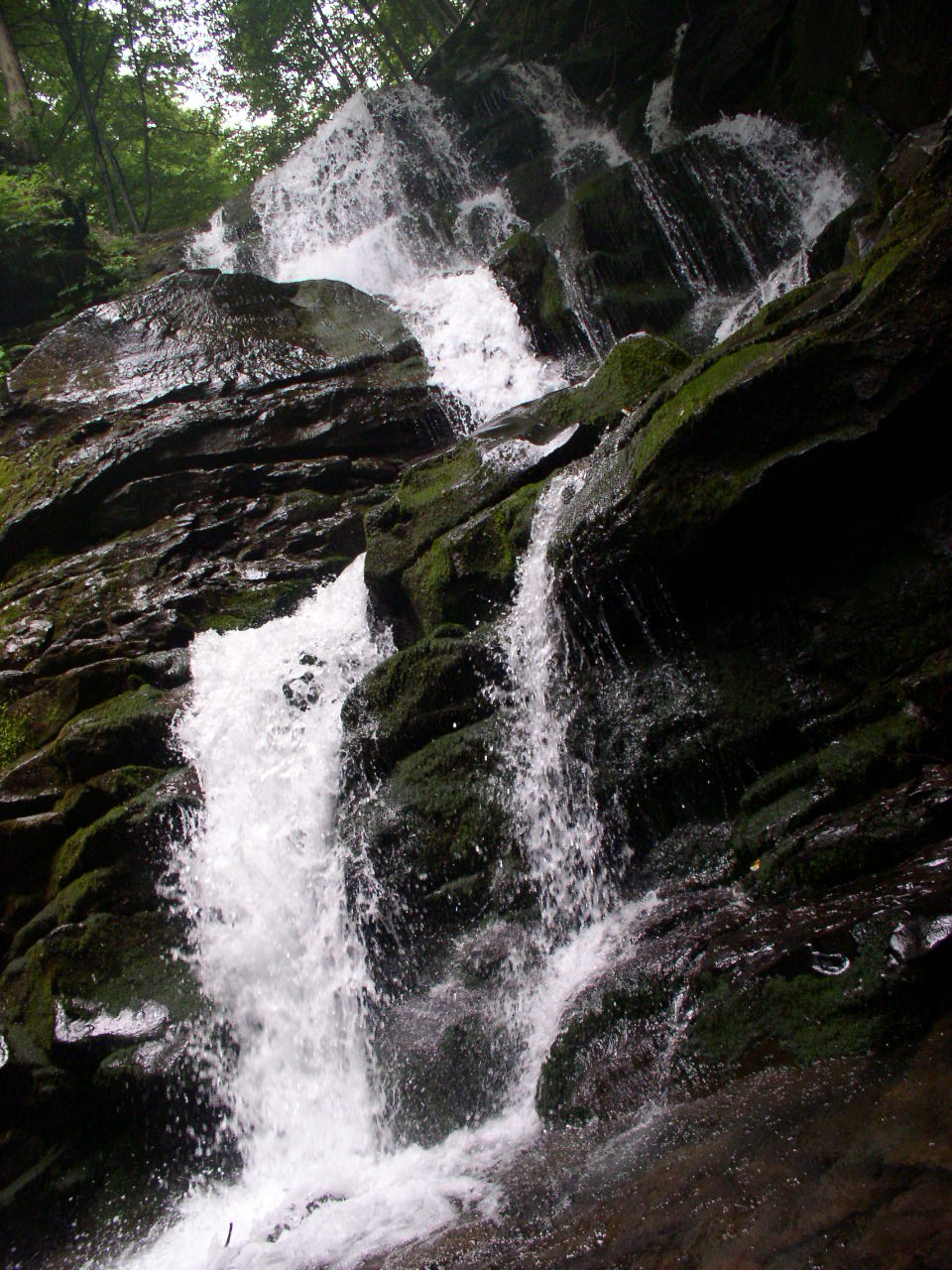
Shypit waterfall is 14 m

Ukraine has diverse geographic features, including several waterfalls. A vast number of rivers run through the mountain ranges. The snow melt from the mountains feeding the rivers and sudden drops in elevation create many opportunities for waterfalls to form.

== Carpathian waterfalls ==
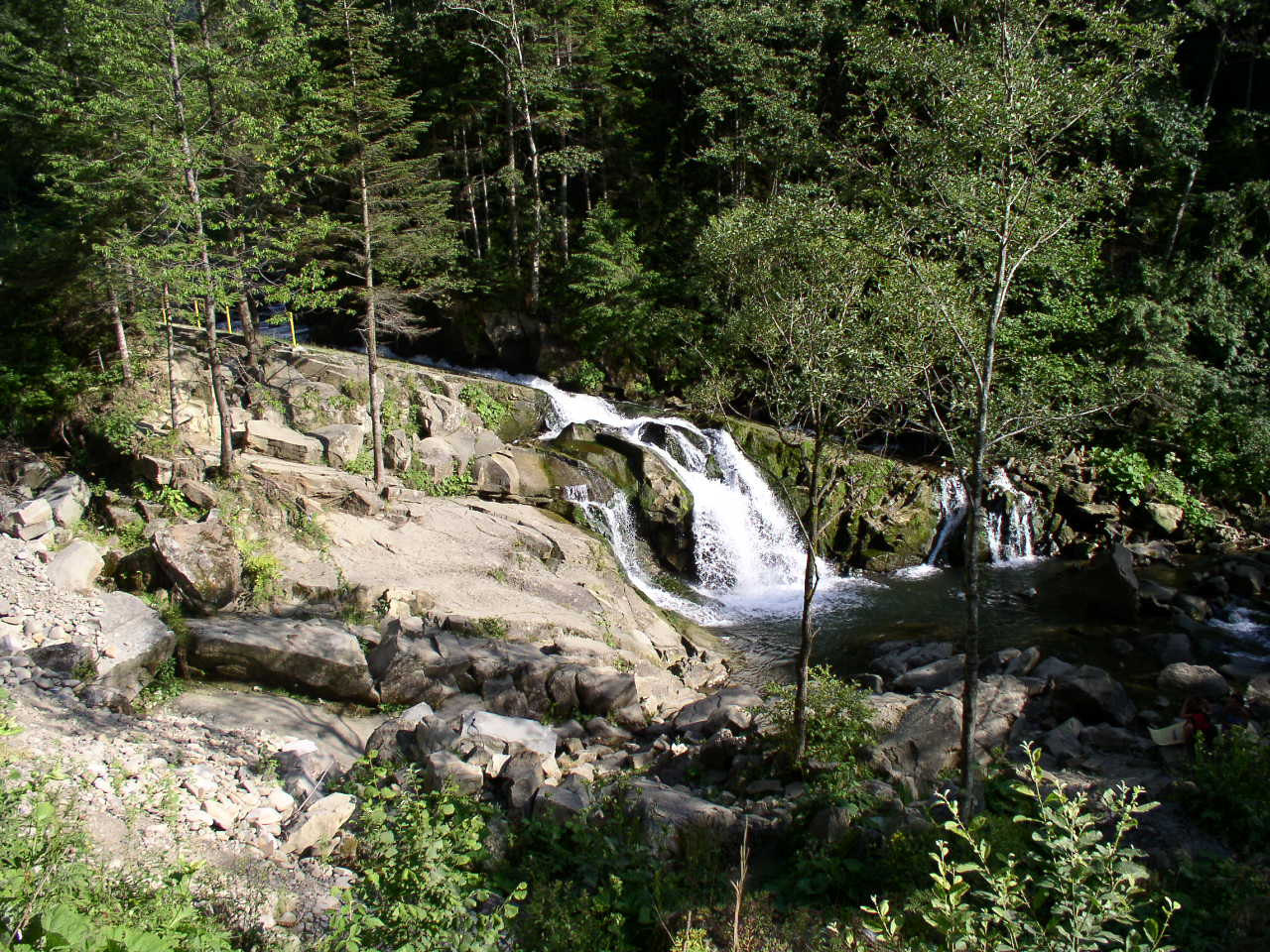
Kamianka waterfall

Most of the waterfalls in the Carpathian Mountains are short and cascade waterfalls. The highest waterfall is the Maniava waterfall, located near the village of Maniava (Ivano-Frankivsk Raion, Ivano-Frankivsk Oblast) which is 14 m (46 ft) tall.

- Shypit – a famous waterfall where an annual festival has been held since 1993, attracts thousands of tourists. The waterfall is created by the Pylypets River, a tributary of Repynka River.
- Kamianka waterfall It is located by the village of Dubyna, Skole district, L'vivs'ka oblast. The waterfall is a part of the Skole Beskydy National Recreation Reserve of Ukraine.
- Sukil waterfalls
- Bukovina waterfalls (also known as Smuharski waterfalls) – a landscape hydrological preserve in Vyzhnytsia Raion. The waterfall is created by Smuhariv Brook, a right tributary of the Cheremosh River.
- Bukhtivets waterfall – part of Bukhtivets Brook (a left tributary of Bystrytsia of Nadvirna), located in the Gorgany mountain range.
- Silver waterfalls or Sheshory waterfalls – created by Pistynka River in Kosiv Raion.
- Maniava waterfall
- Vyshovatyi village waterfall – appears after rain showers near one of Tiachiv Raion villages.
- Voyevodyn waterfall – created by the Voyevodyn River within the State ornithological reserve "Falcons Rocks".
- Horodyliv waterfall – a cascade of waterfalls created by Horodyliv Brook, a right tributary of the Rika River.
- Hurkalo
- Dzembroni waterfalls – created by Munchel Brook, a tributary of the Dzembronia River.
- Drahobrat waterfall – created by Kysva Brook, a tributary of the Chorna Tisa River.
- Zhenetskyi Huk

== Crimean waterfalls ==
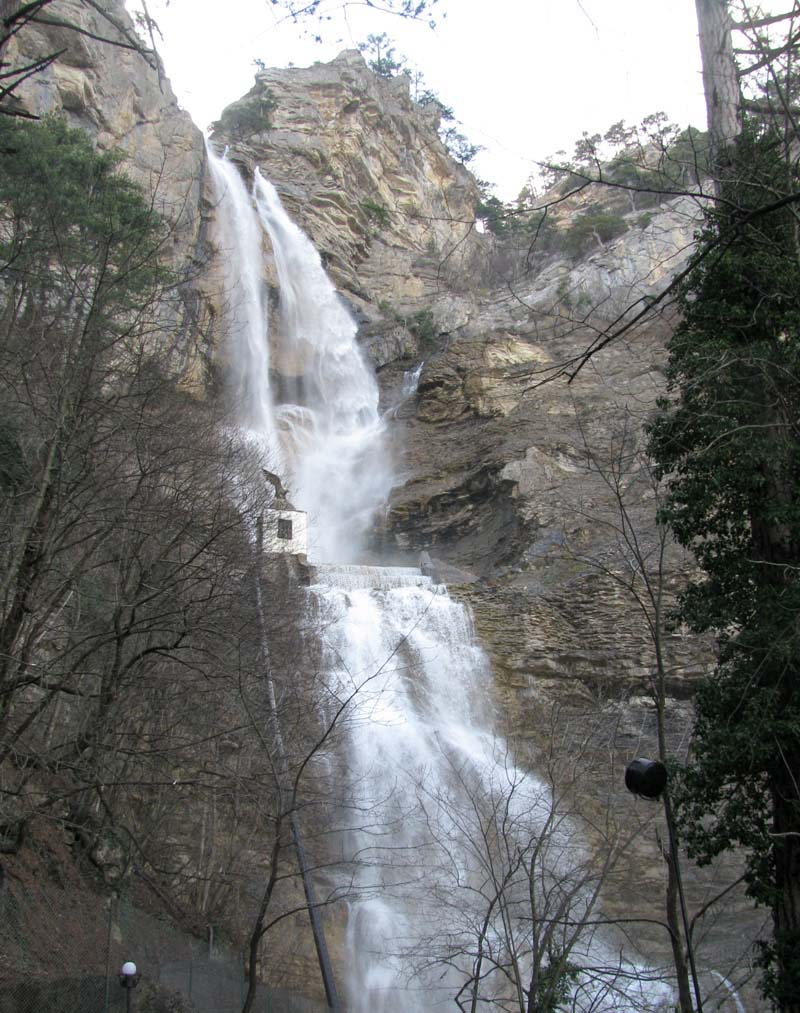
Uchan-su waterfall

- Uchan-su waterfall – the highest Ukrainian waterfall (98 metres) is located on the southern slopes of the Crimean Mountains close to the city of Yalta. The Uchan-su River begins at the foot of Ai-Petri Mountain and flows down the gorge. The waterfall is formed 2 km (1 mi) from the source.
- Curcur waterfall (Jurjur waterfall) – created by Eastern Ulu Ozen (Megapotamo) near Alushta.
- Jurla waterfall – created by Jurla River.
- Geyser waterfall – created by Jurla River.
- Suv Ucqan waterfall – created by Qızıl Qoba River, a tributary of the Salhir River.
- Golovkinsky waterfall – created by Ozen Bas, a tributary of Ulu Ozen.
- Holovkinskoho waterfall – created by the Uzen'-Bash River.

== Non-mountainous waterfalls ==
- Dzhurynskyi Fall is located on the Dzhuryn river in Nyrkiv village, Zalishchyky Raion, Ternopil Oblast of western Ukraine
- Vyr – created by Hirsky Tikych River, a tributary of Tikych River.
- Vchelka waterfall – created by Hnylopiat River, a right tributary of Teteriv River.

== Gallery ==
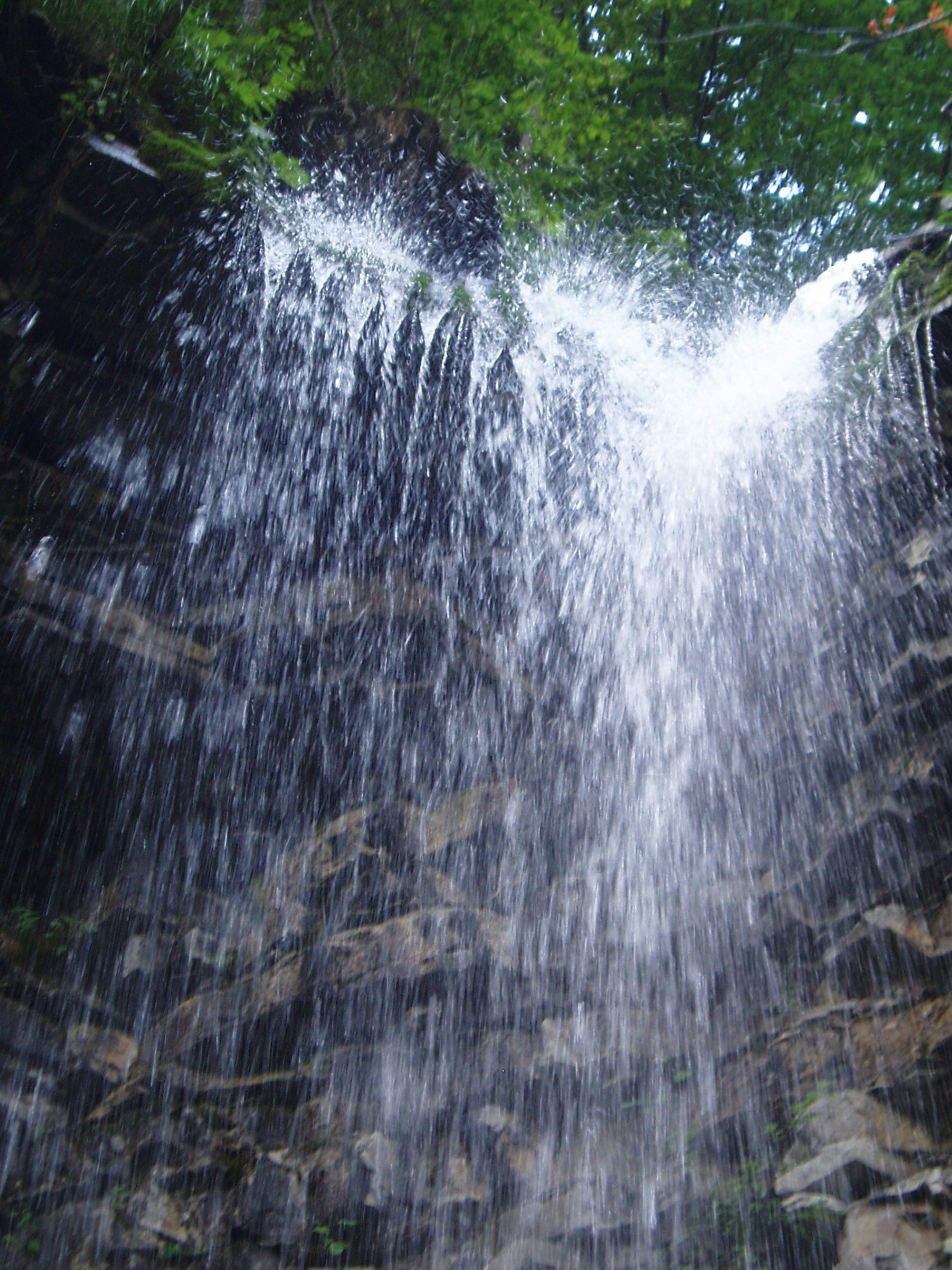
Bukhtivets

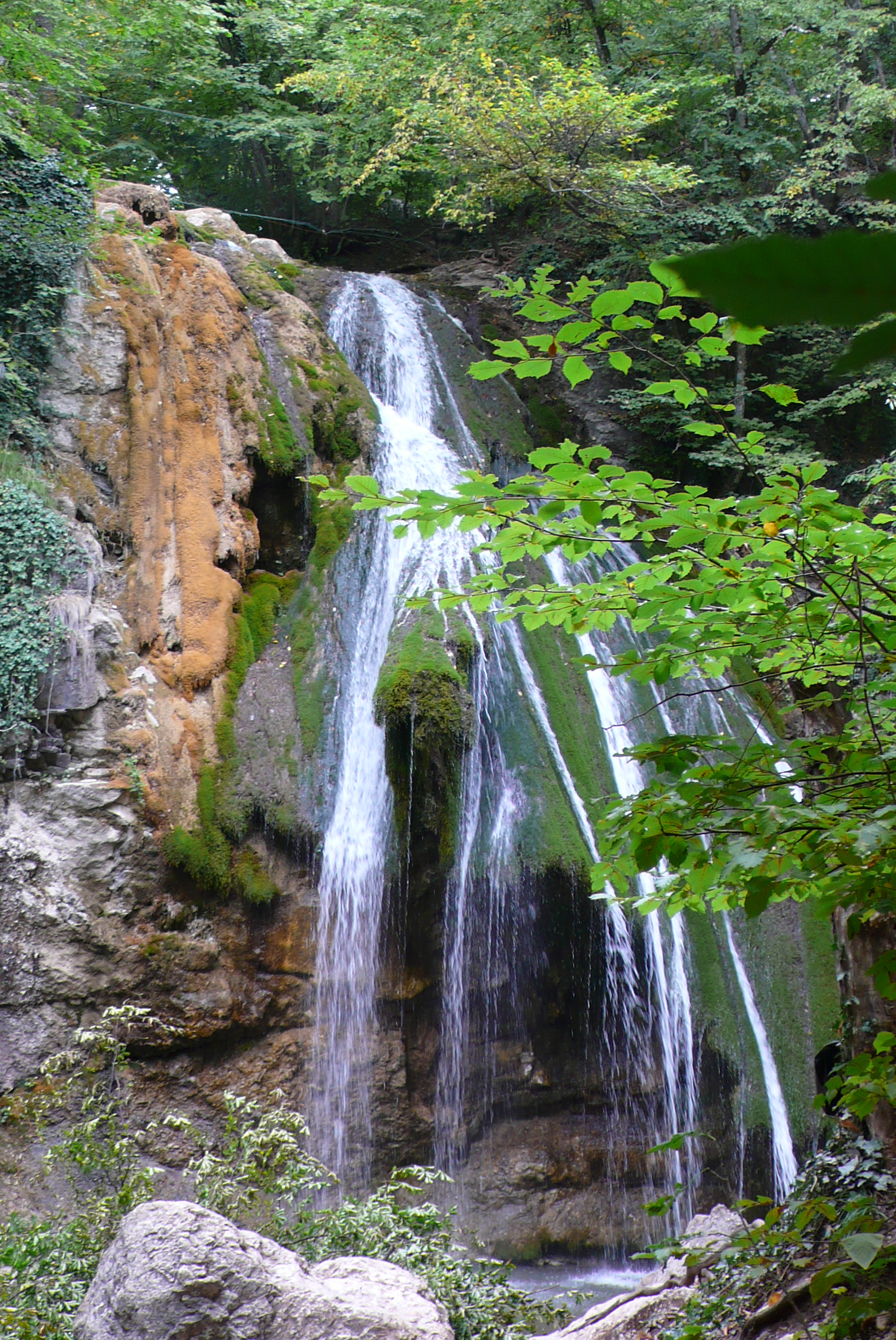
Dzhur-Dzhur

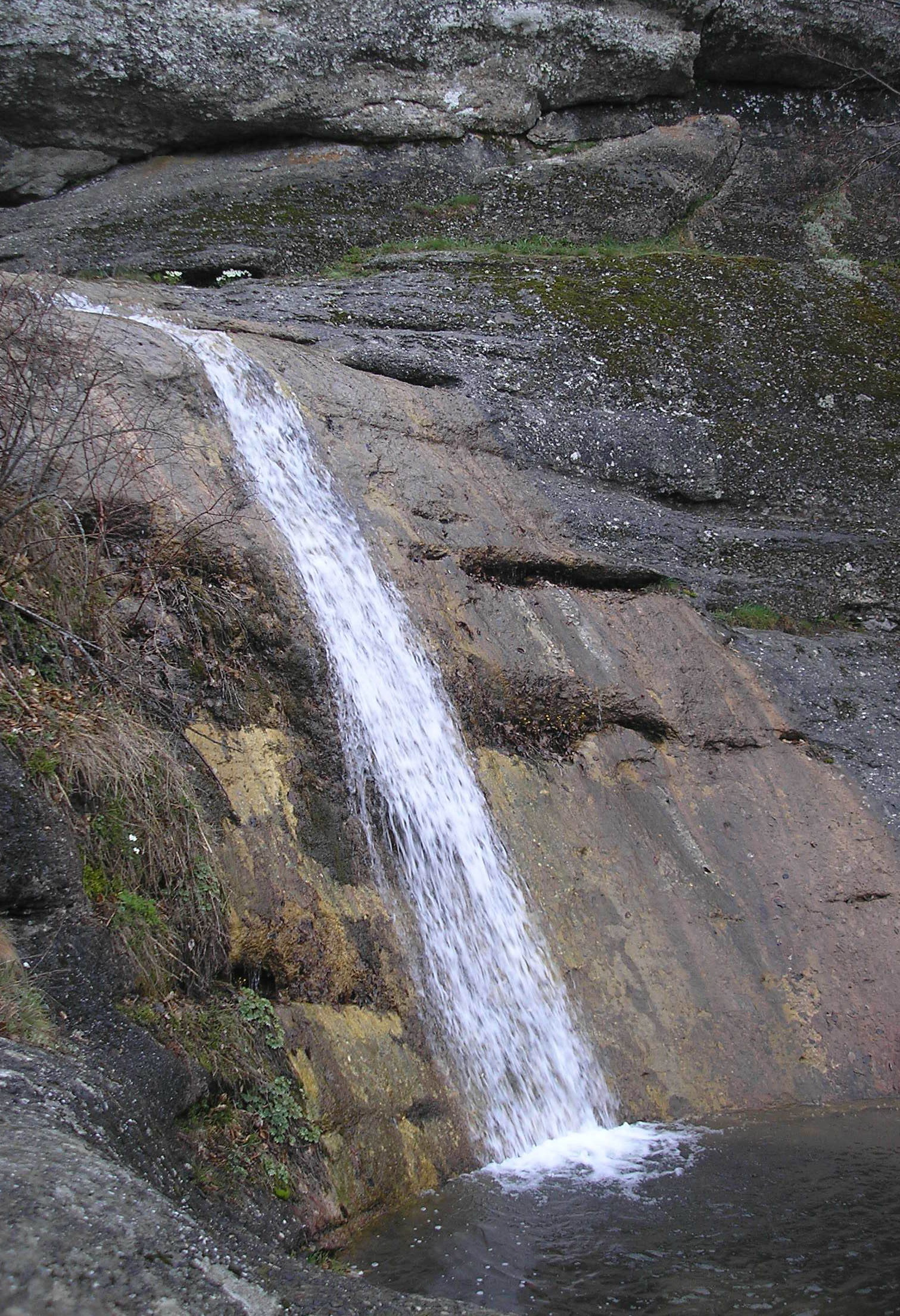
Dhzurla

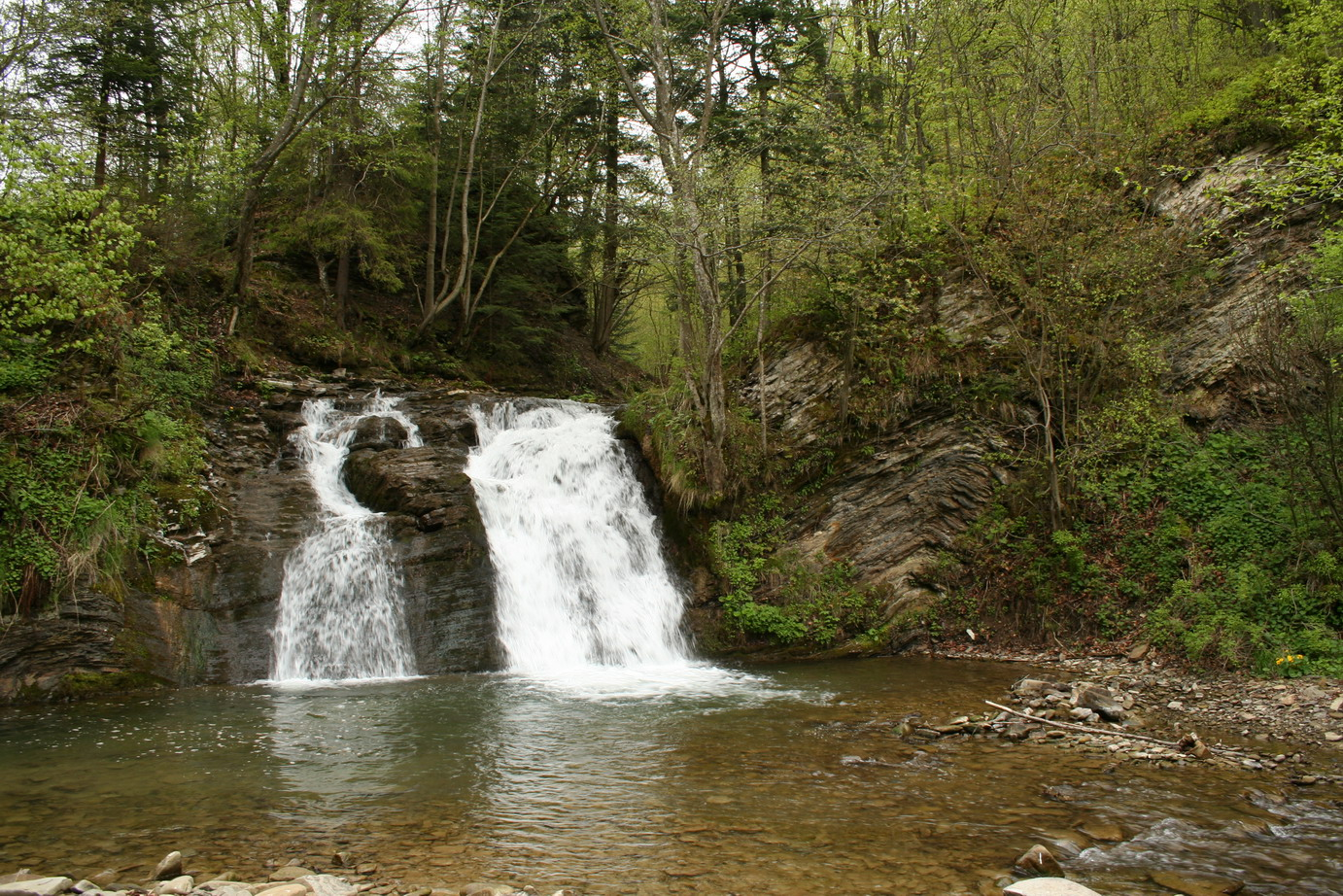
Hurkalo

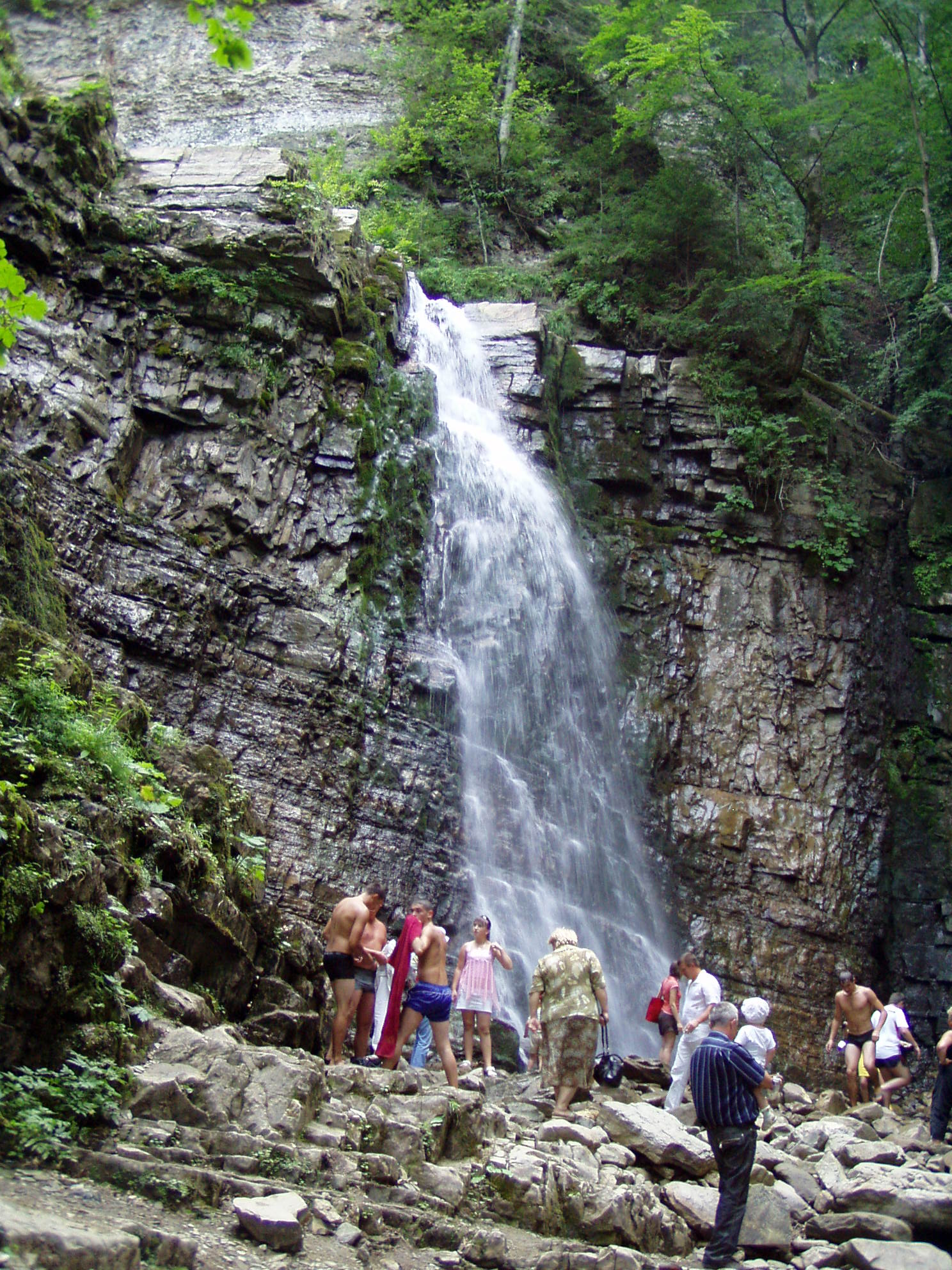
Maniava

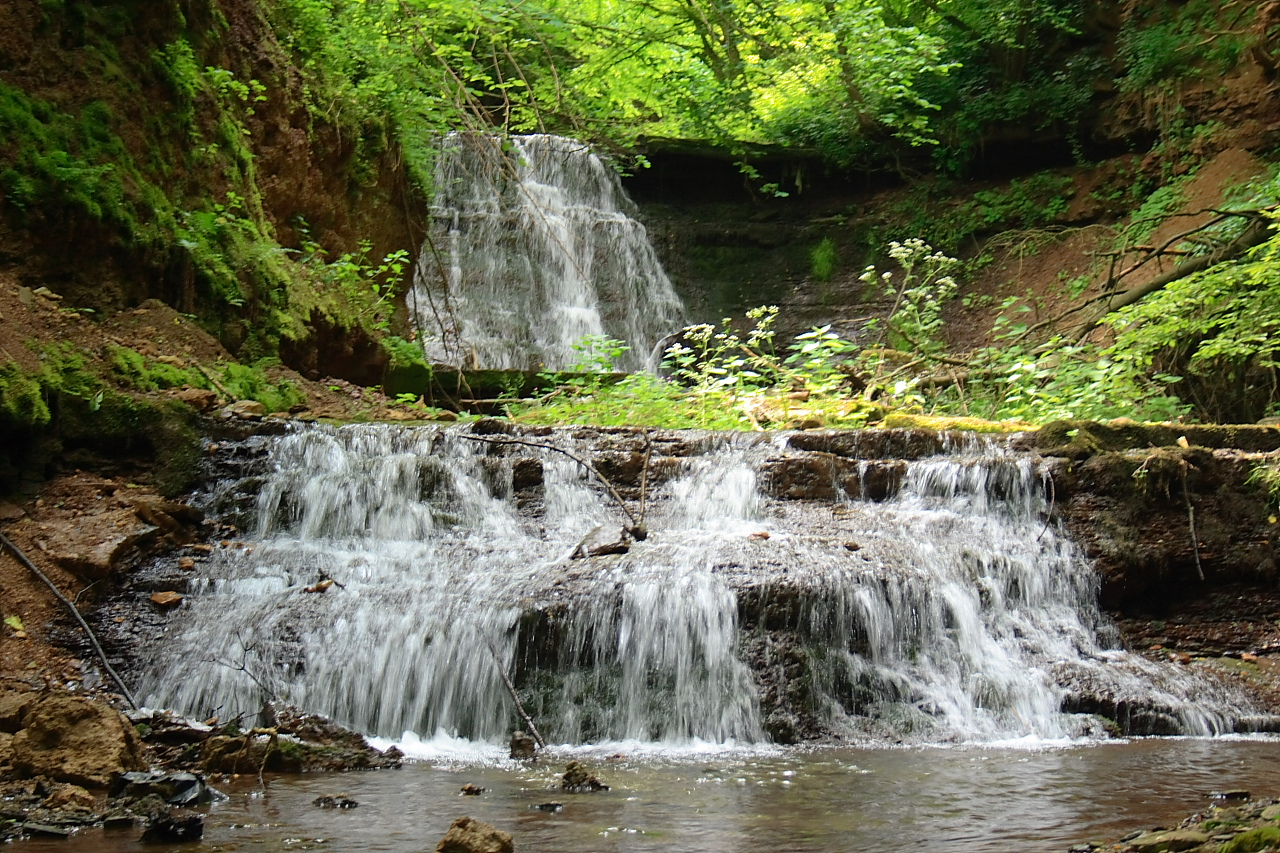
Rusilivski

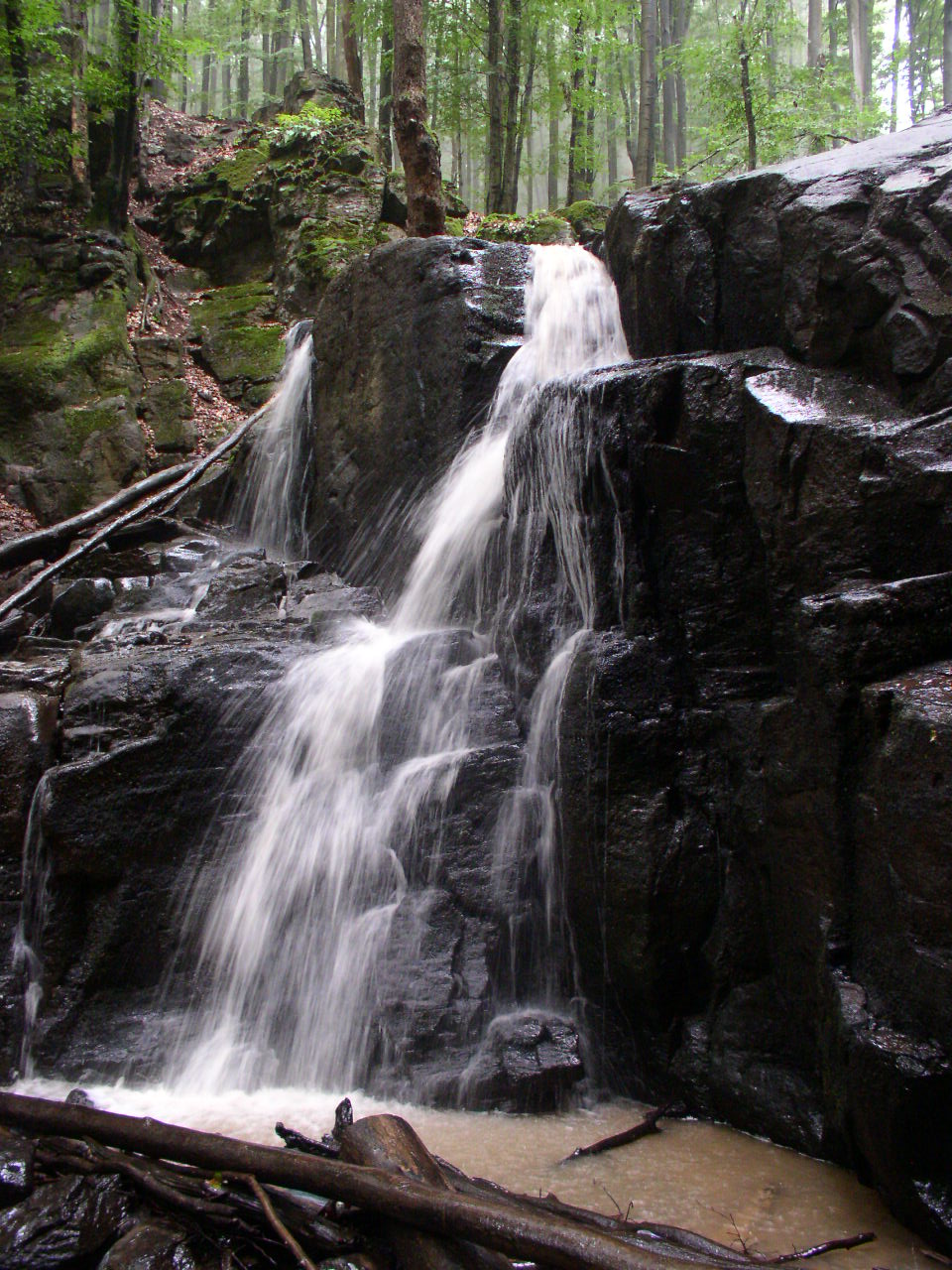
Skakunok

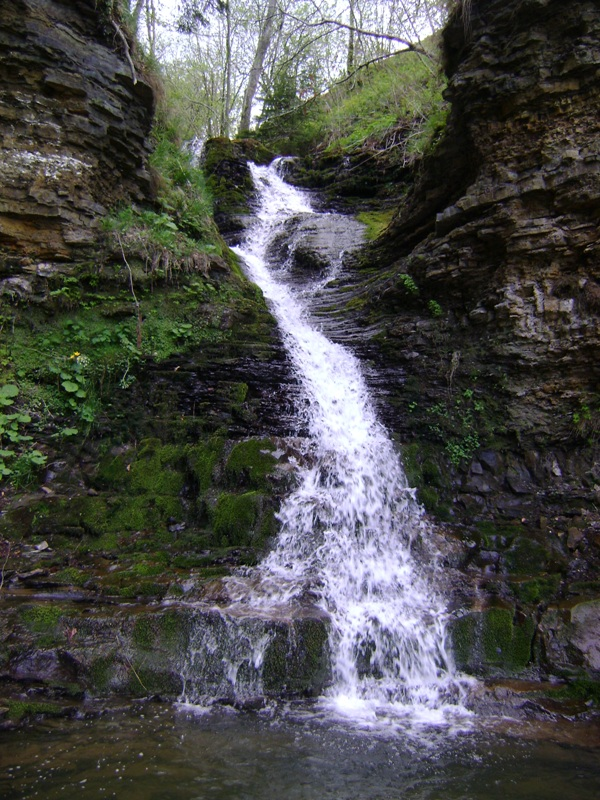
Sukil waterfall in the Sukil village

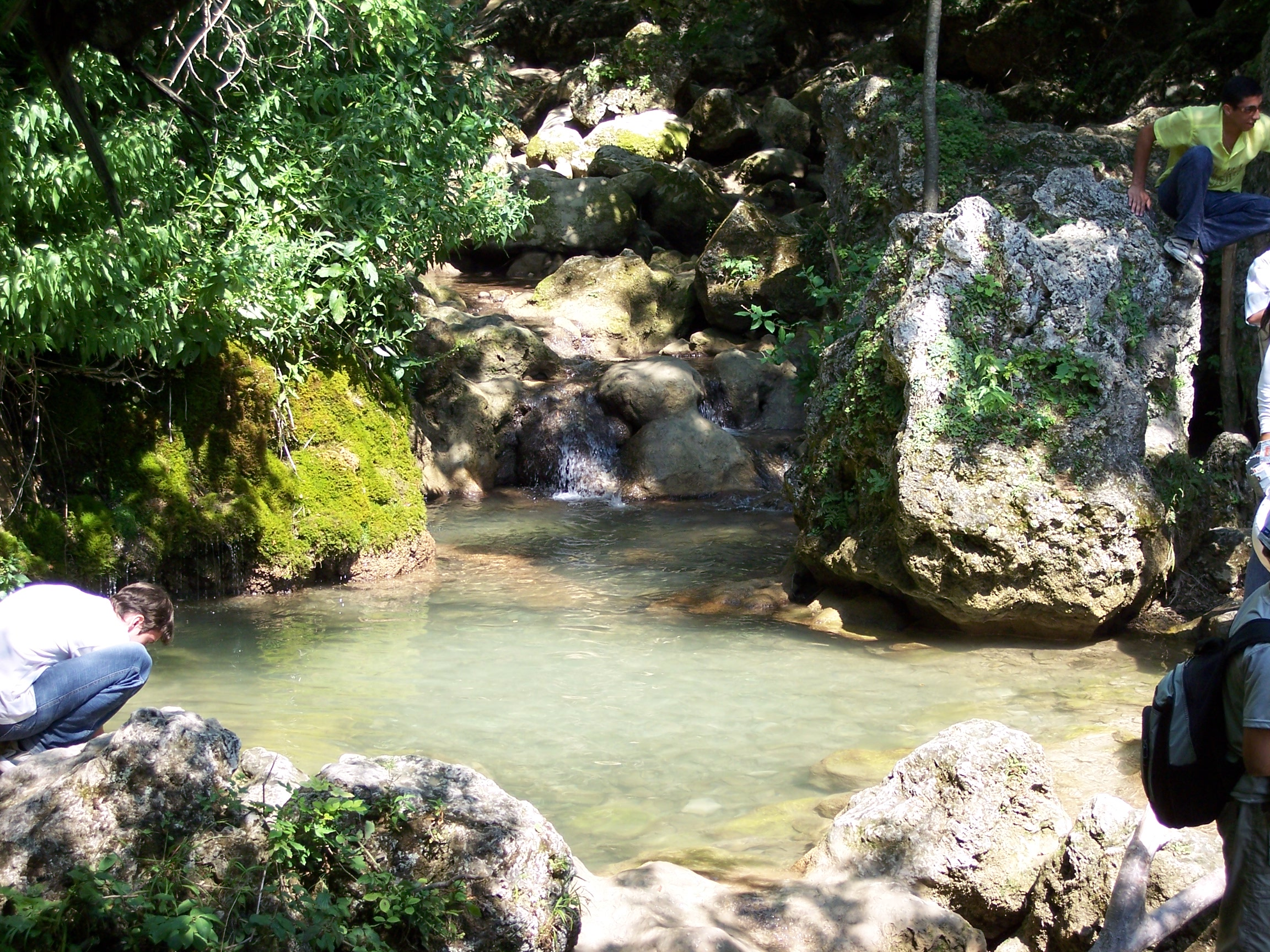
Suv-Ucqan

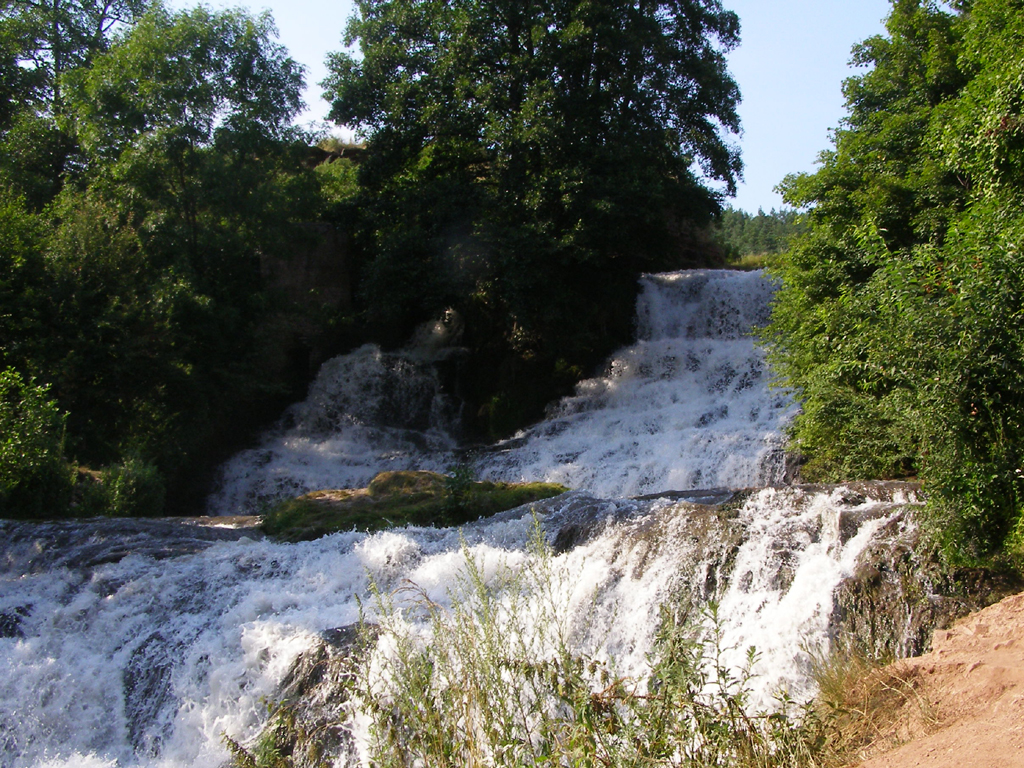
Dzhurinskyi

== See also ==
- List of waterfalls
- List of rivers of Ukraine
