= Voievodyn waterfall =

Voievodyn
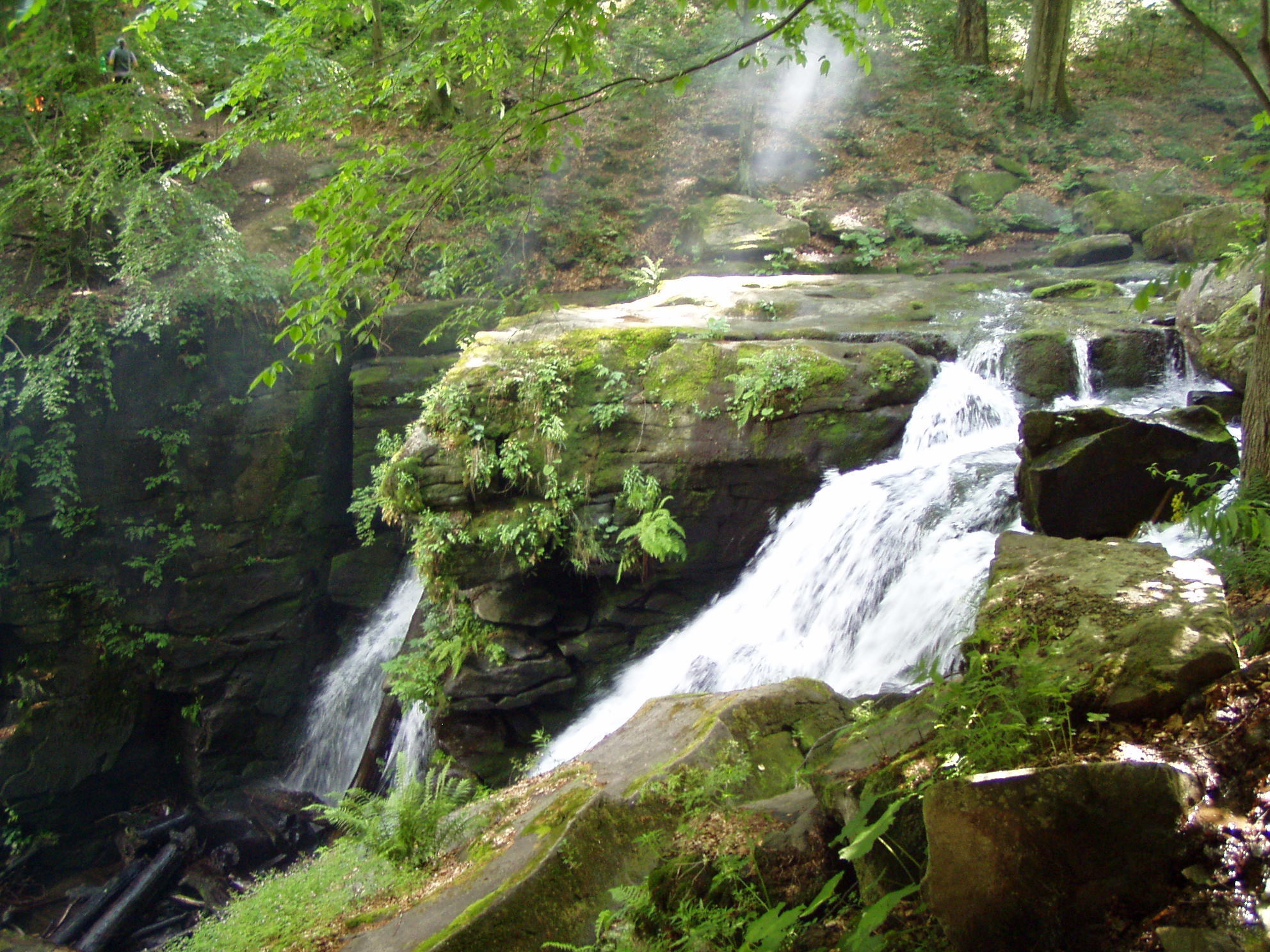
- Voievodyn Waterfall

- Location within Zakarpattia Oblast Location within Ukraine
- Location: Uzhhorod Raion, Zakarpattia Oblast, Ukraine
- Coordinates: 48°42′N 22°48′E
- Elevation: 600 metres (2,000 ft)
- Total height: 9 metres (30 ft)
- Watercourse: Voievodyn River

The Voievodyn waterfall (Ukrainian: Воєводин) is located on the Voievodyn River, about 14 kilometres (8.7 mi) from the village of Turia Poliana, Uzhhorod Raion, Zakarpattia Oblast of western Ukraine. The waterfall is 9 metres (30 ft) high.

== See also ==
- List of waterfalls
- Waterfalls of Ukraine
- http://www.turystam.in.ua 1 and 2
