= Zhenetskyi Huk =

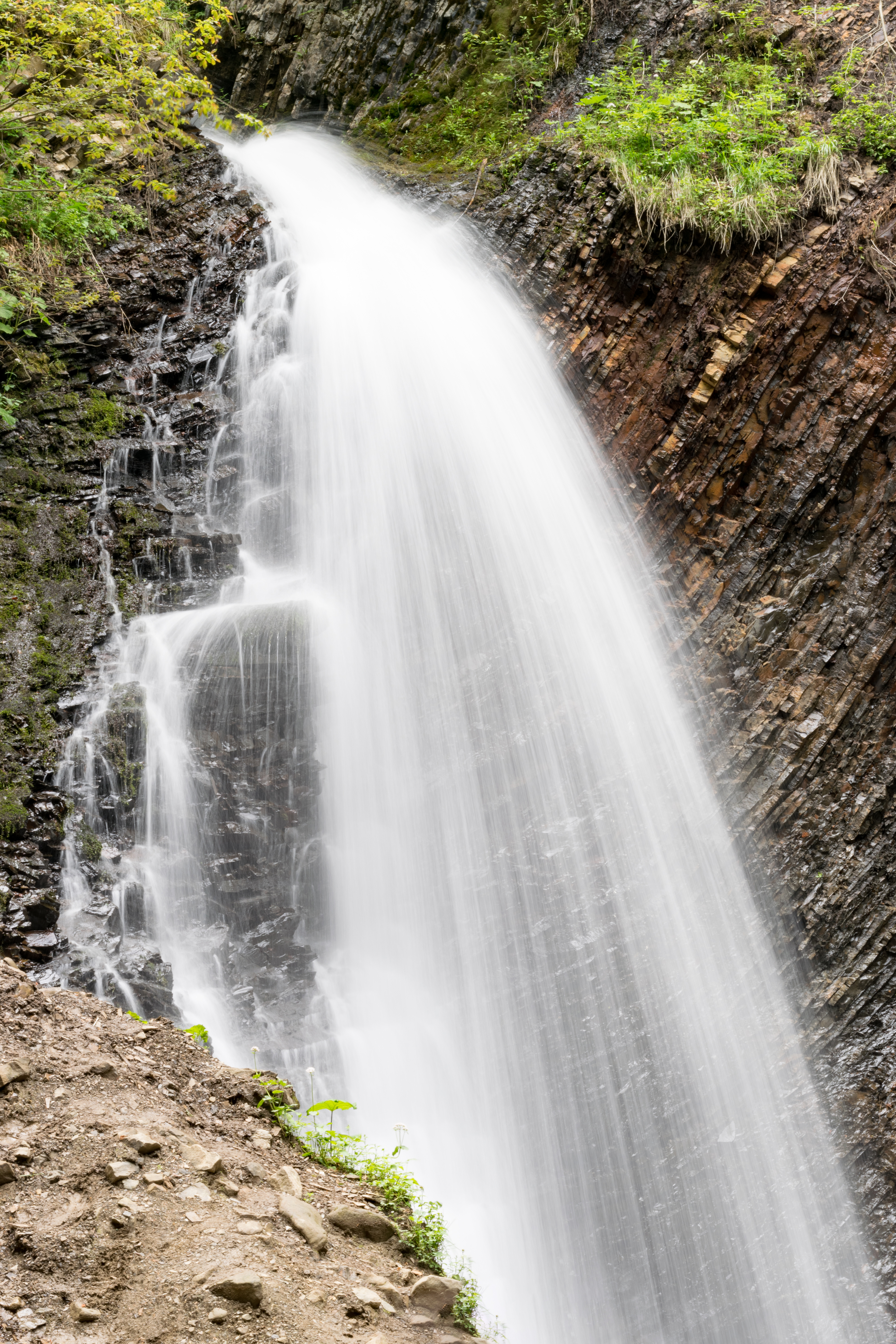

- Location within Ivano-Frankivsk Oblast Location within Ukraine
- Location: Nadvirna Raion, Ivano-Frankivsk Oblast, Ukraine
- Coordinates: 48°23′27″N 24°29′57″E
- Elevation: 900 metres (3,000 ft)
- Total height: 15 metres (49 ft)
- Watercourse: Genets' (river)

The Zhenetskyi Huk (Ukrainian: Женецький Гук) or the Zhenetskyi waterfall is located on the Zhenets river about 9 km from Tatariv village, Nadvirna Raion, Ivano-Frankivsk Oblast in western Ukraine. the waterfall's height is 15 metres (49 ft). Residents named the waterfall Huk because of the noise that is heard from it.

Zhenetskyi Huk is located on the Carpathian National Park, Gorgany mountain ridge and on the tourist root to Mount Homiak.

== See also ==
- List of waterfalls
- Waterfalls of Ukraine
