= Holovkinskoho waterfall =

Waterfall in the Crimean Mountains

Holovkinskoho
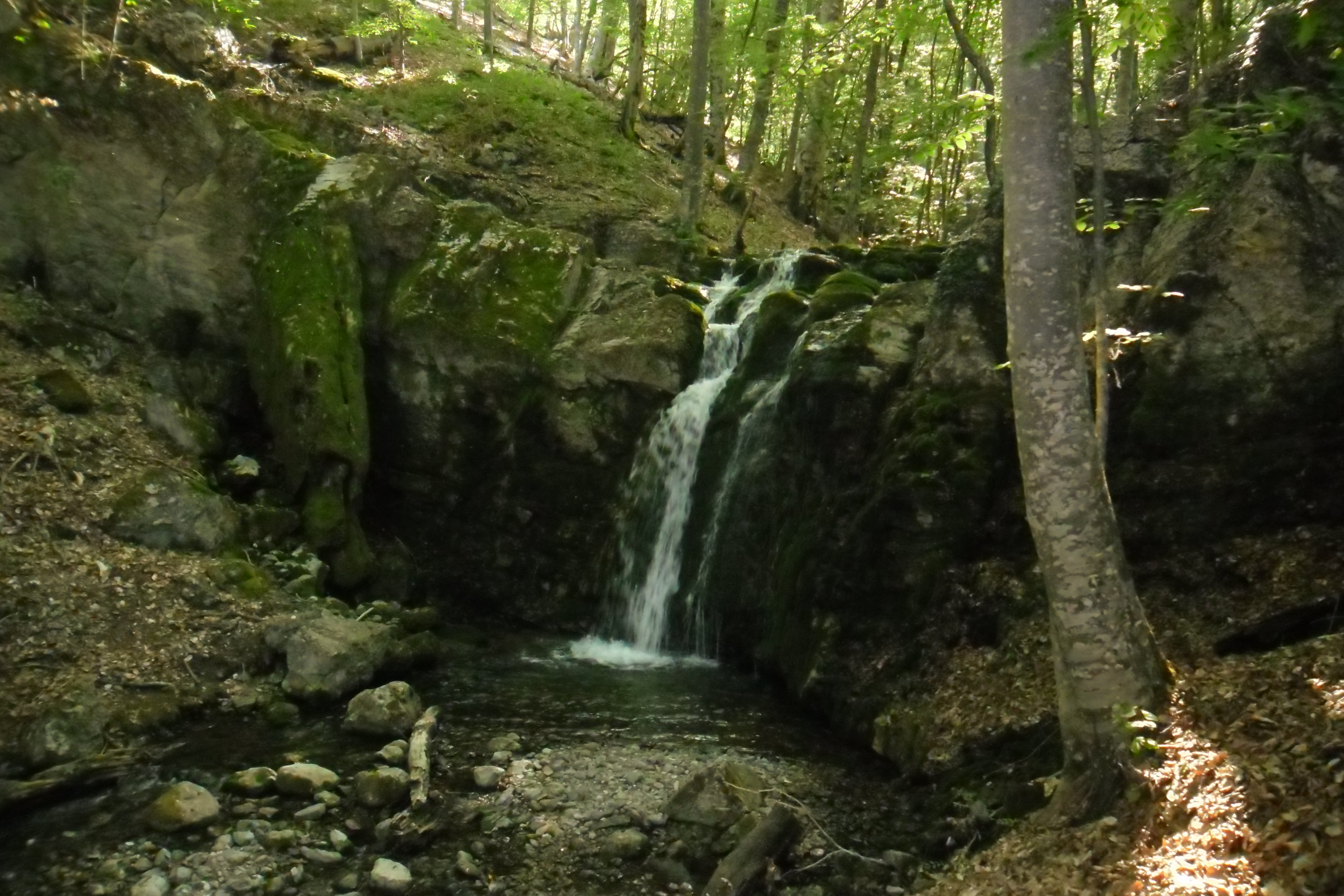

- Location within Crimea Location within Ukraine
- Location: Crimean Mountains, Crimea
- Coordinates: 44°41′10″N 34°18′26″E
- Total height: c. 12 metres (39 ft)
- Watercourse: Uzen'-Bash river

The Holovkinskoho waterfall (Ukrainian: Водоспад Головкінського) is located on the Uzen'-Bash river in the Crimean Mountains, Crimea. The waterfall's height is about 12 metres (39 ft). It was included in a list of most beautiful waterfalls in Ukraine.

== See also ==
- List of waterfalls
- Waterfalls of Ukraine
