= Hurkalo =

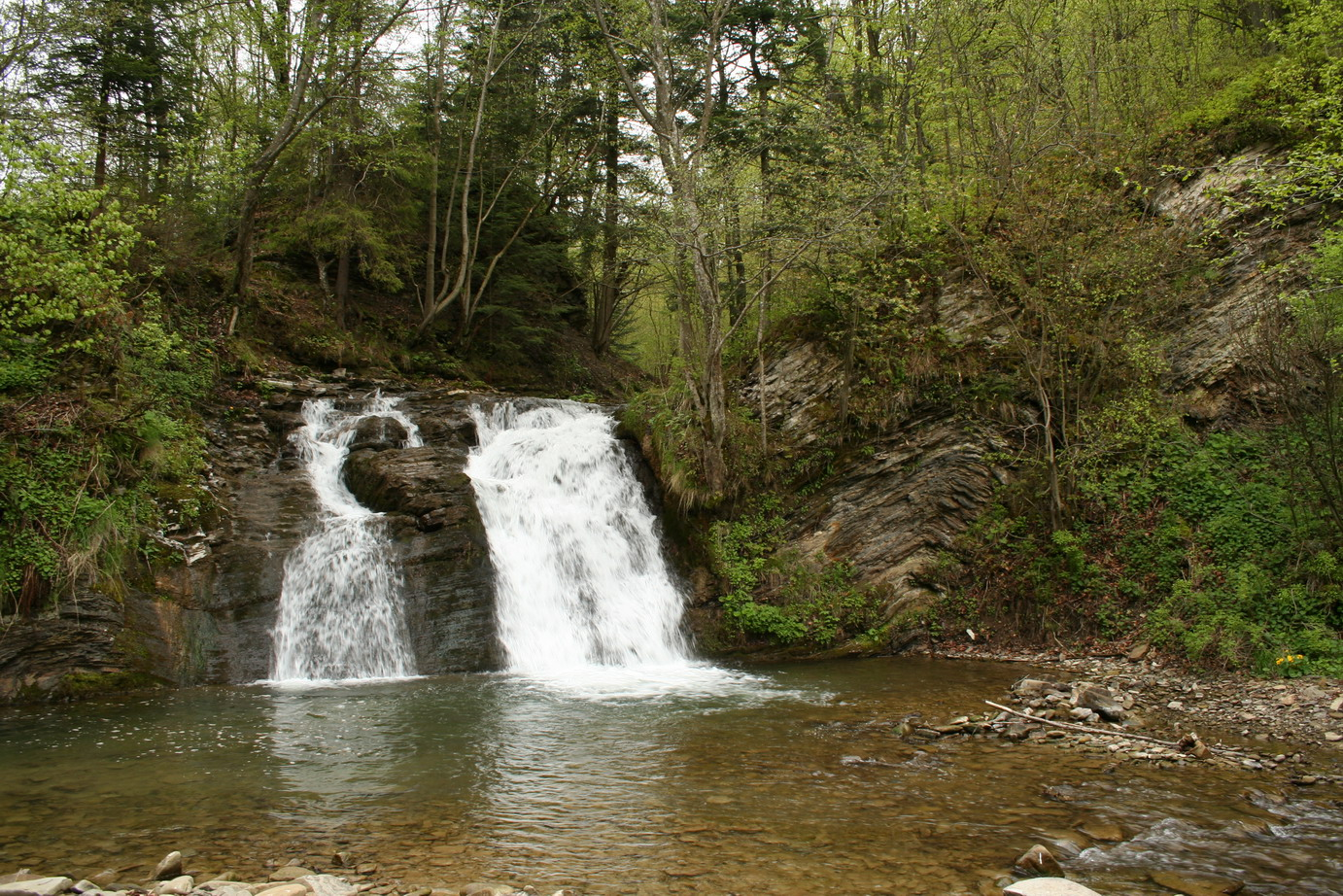

- Location within Lviv Oblast Location within Ukraine
- Location: Stryi Raion, Lviv Oblast, Ukraine
- Coordinates: 49°05′02″N 23°28′19″E
- Total height: 5 metres (16 ft)
- Number of drops: 1
- Total width: 4 metres (13 ft)
- Watercourse: Velyka Richka River

The Hurkalo (Ukrainian: Гуркало) waterfall is located on the Velyka Richka River, 3 kilometres (1.9 mi) south-west of Korchyn, Stryi Raion, Lviv Oblast of western Ukraine. The waterfall is 5 metres (16 ft) high.

== See also ==
- List of waterfalls
- Waterfalls of Ukraine
