= Sukil waterfalls =

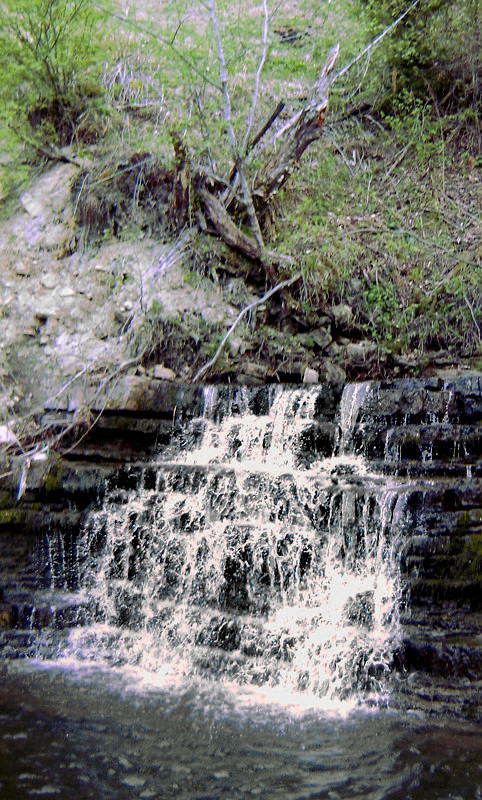

- Location within Ivano-Frankivsk Oblast Location within Ukraine
- Location: Kalush Raion, Ivano-Frankivsk Oblast
- Coordinates: 48°59′32″N 23°37′19″E
- Longest drop: c. 8 metres (26 ft)

The Sukil waterfalls (Ukrainian: Сукільські водоспади, romanized: Sukils'ki vodospady) are located on the Sukil River in the Skole Beskids mountain range of the Ukrainian Carpathians.

== Geography ==
Two of the Sukil waterfalls are located in the village of Sukil in Kalush Raion, Ivano-Frankivsk Oblast. The higher of these is about 9 metres (30 ft) high and 2 metres (6.6 ft) wide, while the lower is about 3 metres (9.8 ft) high and 8 metres (26 ft) wide. The distance between the two waterfalls is about 500 metres (1,600 ft).

The last of the Sukil waterfalls is located about twelve kilometers down the Sukil River in the village of Bubnyshche, and consists of six cascades. The highest of these cascades is about one meter high.

Despite their beauty the Sukil waterfalls remain relatively unknown. They are a popular attraction for tourists who come primarily to see the Dovbush rocks.

== Gallery ==
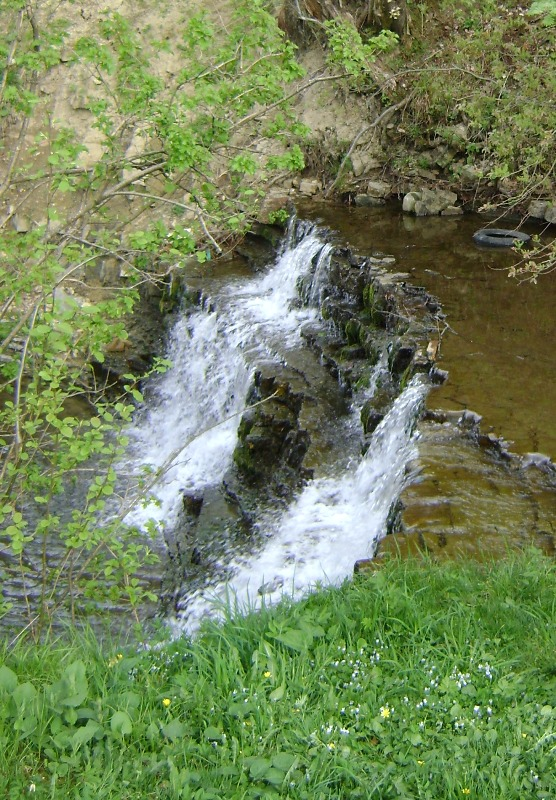
Sukil waterfall in the Sukil village

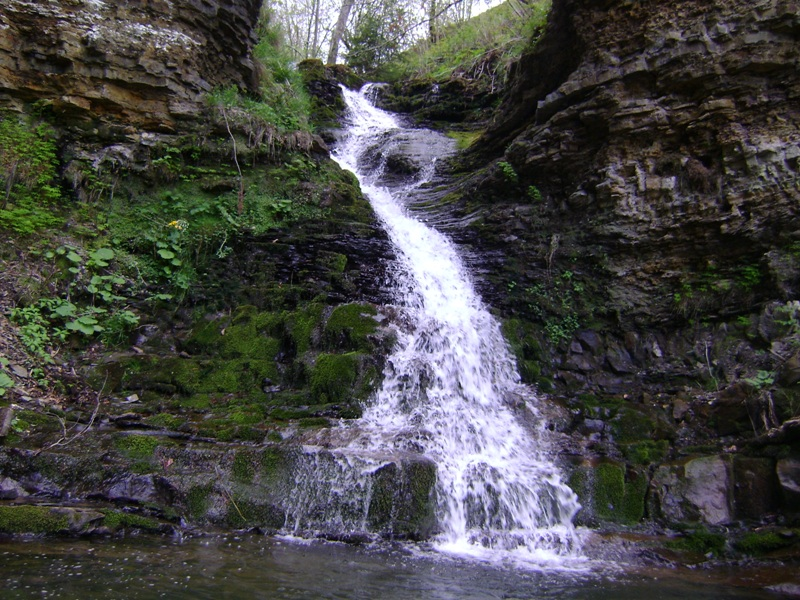
Sukil waterfall in the Sukil village

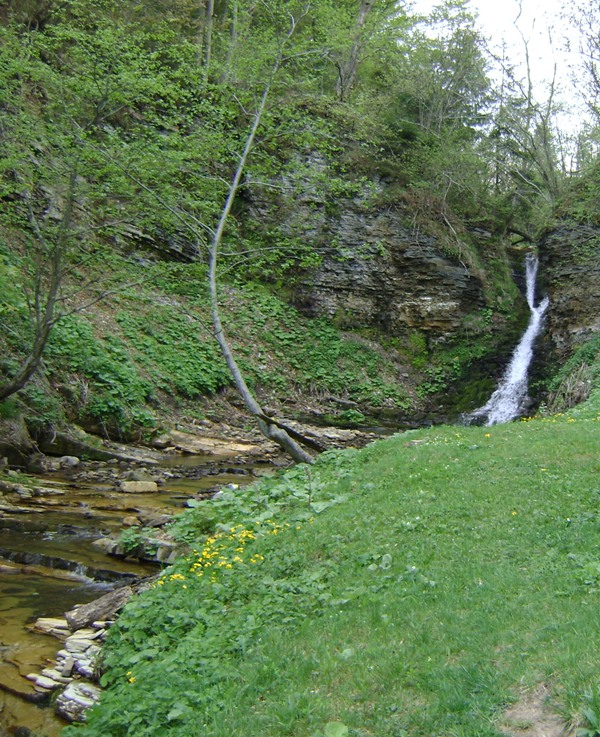

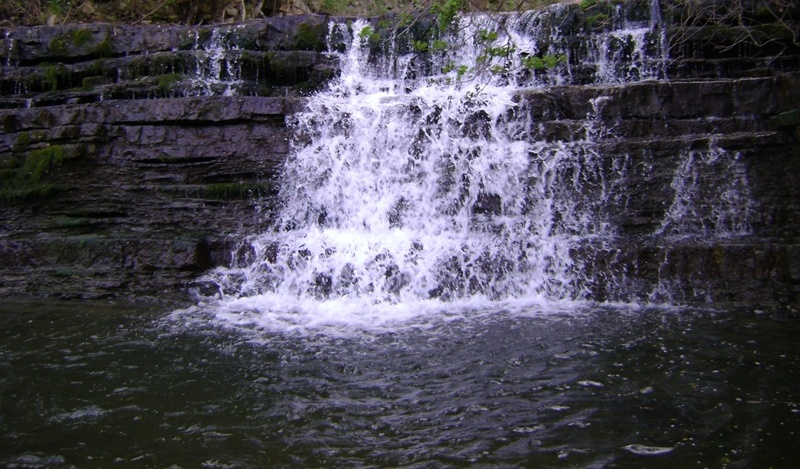

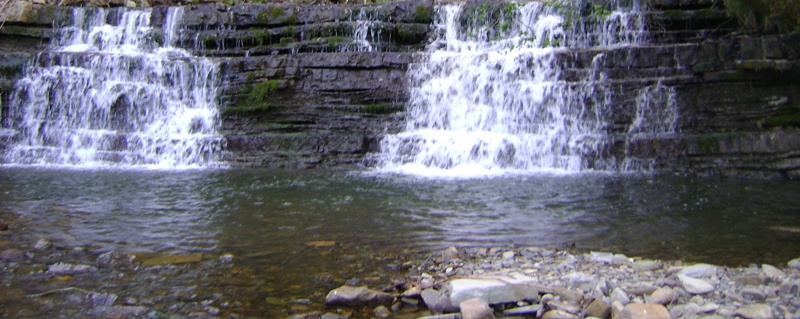

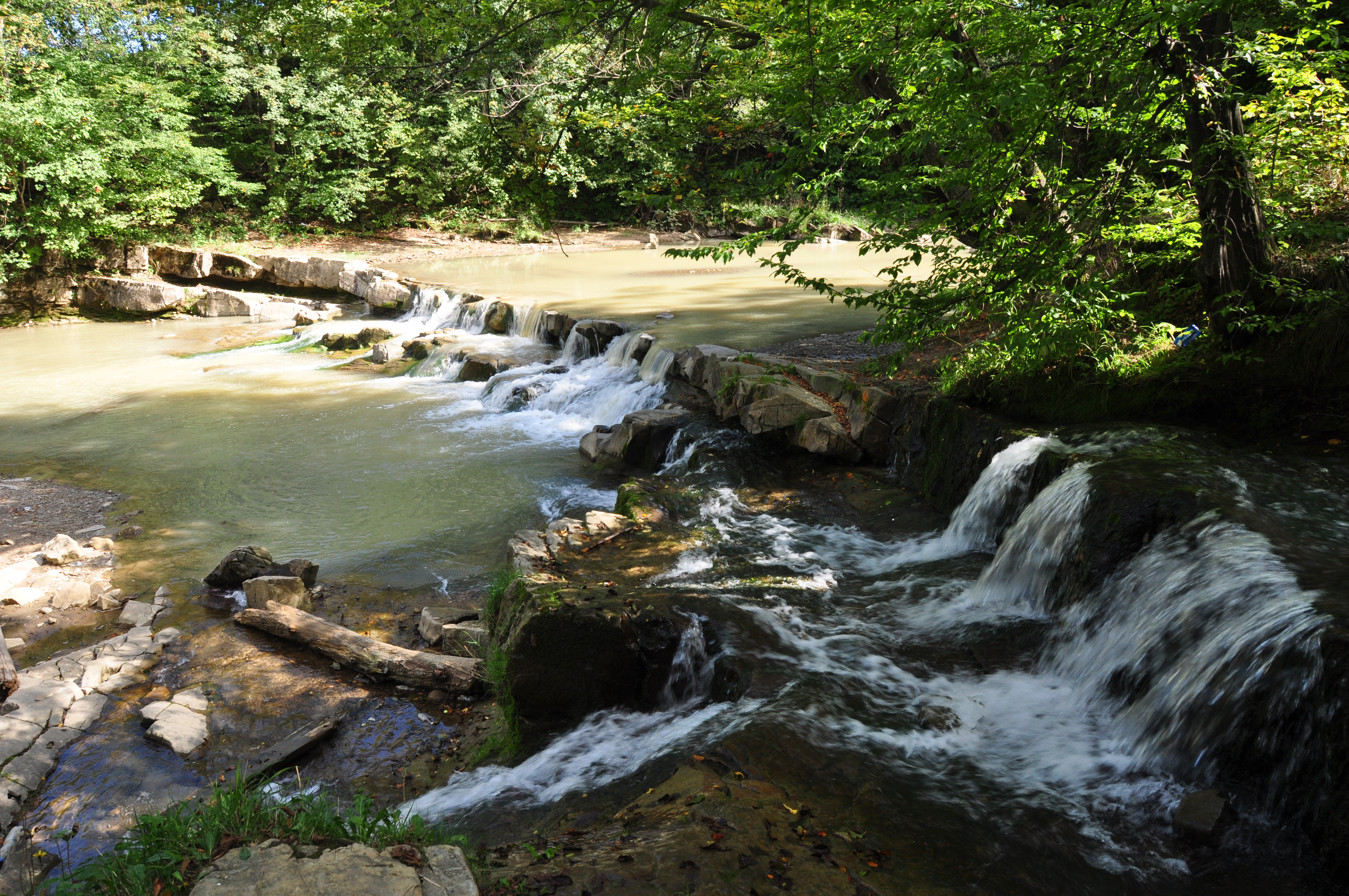

== See also ==
- List of waterfalls
- List of waterfalls in Ukraine
