= Vchelka =

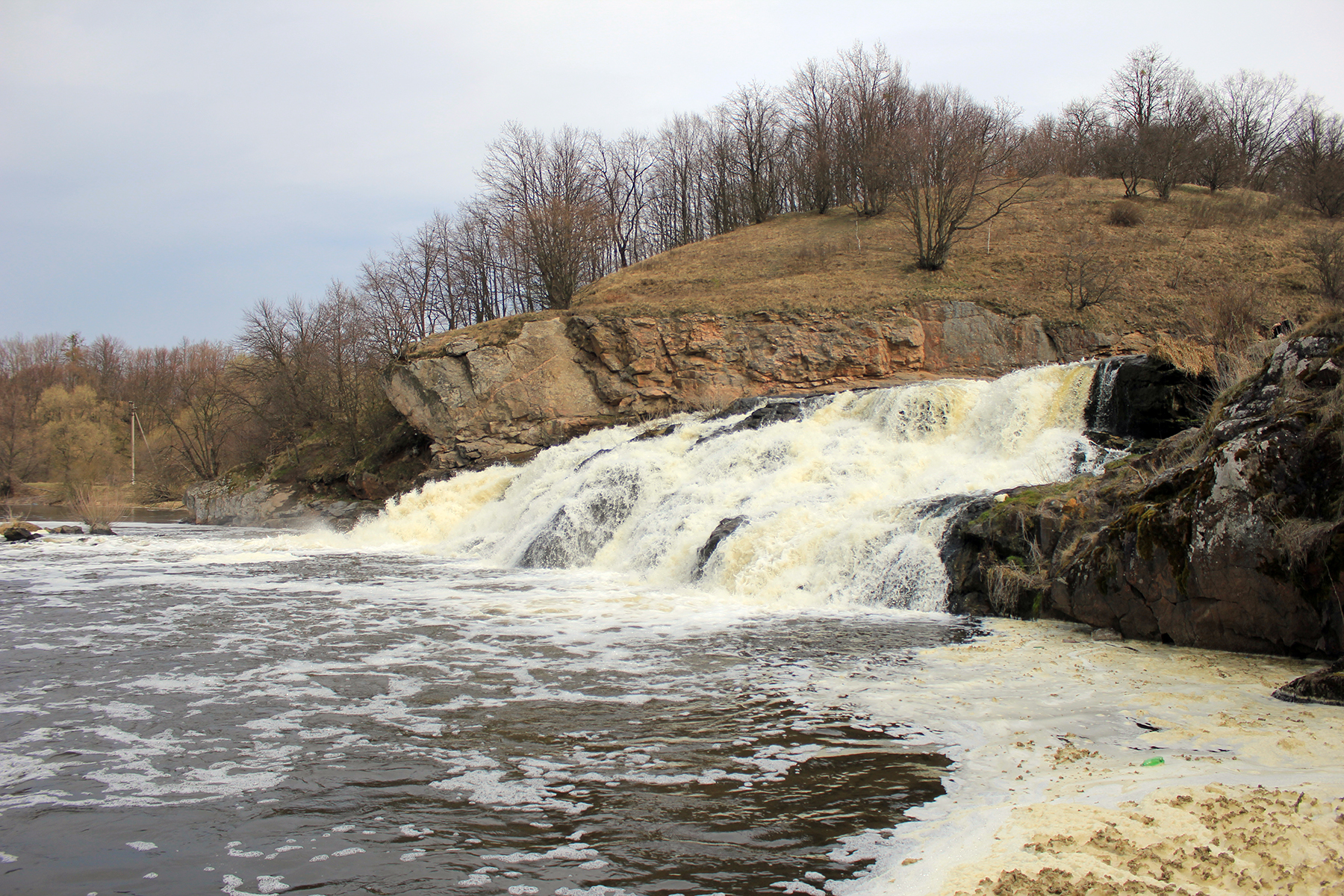

- Location within Zhytomyr Oblast Location within Ukraine
- Location: Zhytomyr Raion, Zhytomyr Oblast, Ukraine
- Coordinates: 50°11′58″N 28°33′07″E
- Total height: 10 metres (33 ft)
- Number of drops: 3
- Total width: 40 metres (130 ft)
- Watercourse: Gnylopiat' River

The Vchelka (Ukrainian: Вчелька) waterfall is located on the Hnylopiat River in the Zhytomyr Raion, Zhytomyr Oblast, Ukraine, between the villages of Sinhury, Holovenka and Perliavka. The waterfall is 10 metres (33 ft) high and about 40 metres (130 ft) wide.

== Name ==
The name of the waterfall comes from the area — the Vchelka farm, which belonged to the Zhytomyr doctor and philanthropist Franz Vchelka. As of 1906, there were 43 yards (ca. 39 m) on the farm and 232 inhabitants.

== See also ==
- List of waterfalls
- Waterfalls of Ukraine
