= Kamianka waterfall =

Kamianka
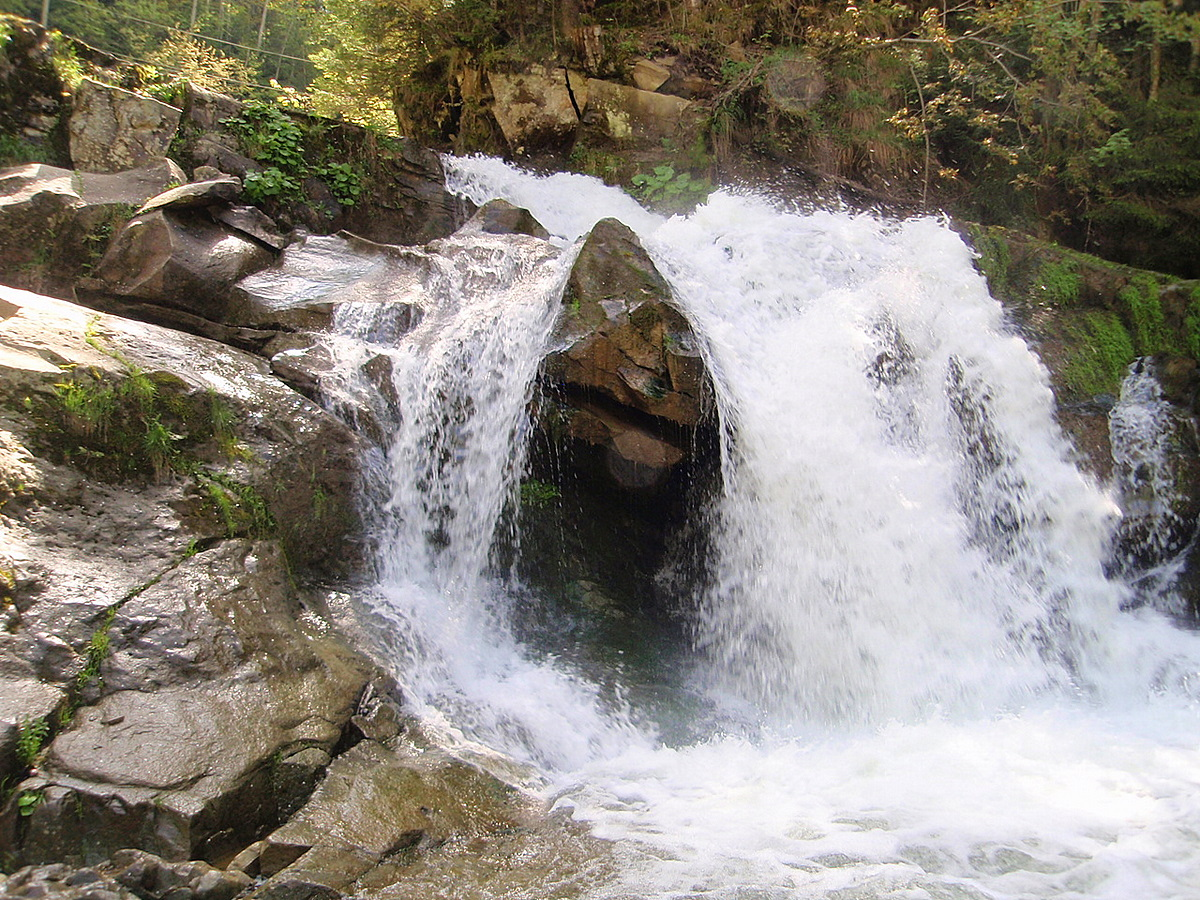

- Location within Lviv Oblast Location within Ukraine
- Location: Dubyna, Skole Raion, Lviv Oblast, Ukraine
- Coordinates: 49°02′01″N 23°33′51″E
- Elevation: 550 metres (1,800 ft)
- Total height: 7 metres (23 ft)
- Number of drops: 1
- Average width: 4 metres (13 ft)
- Watercourse: Kamianka river

The Kamianka or the Kamianetskyi waterfall (Ukrainian: Кам'янецький водоспад) is located on the Kamianka river in the National Park Dubyna, Skole Raion, Lviv Oblast of western Ukraine The waterfall's height is 7 metres (23 ft).

== See also ==
- List of waterfalls
- Waterfalls of Ukraine
