= Maniava =

Rural locality in Ivano-Frankivsk Oblast, Ukraine

Maniava Манява Maniawa
- Village
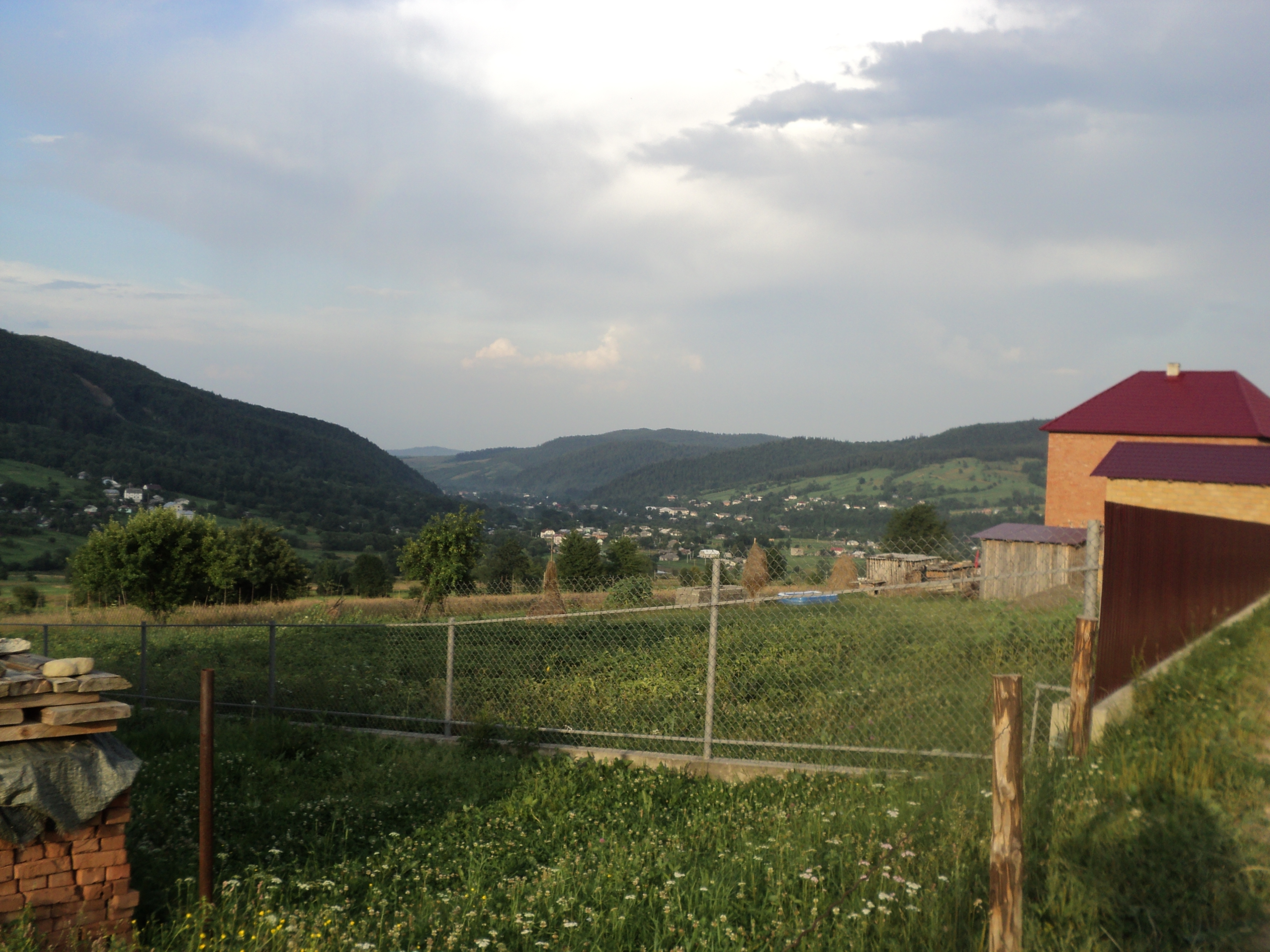
- The village of Maniava
- Interactive map of Maniava
- Location within Ivano-Frankivsk Oblast Location within Ukraine
- Coordinates: 48°39′15″N 24°22′12″E
- Country: Ukraine
- Oblast: Ivano-Frankivsk Oblast
- Raion: Ivano-Frankivsk Raion
- Hromada: Solotvyn settlement hromada

Area
  - Total: 42 km^{2} (16 sq mi)
- Elevation: 519 m (1,703 ft)

Population (2022)
  - Total: 3,491
  - Density: 83/km^{2} (220/sq mi)
- Time zone: UTC+2 (EET)
  - Summer (DST): UTC+3 (EEST)
- Postal code: 77772
- Area code: +380 3471

Maniava or Manyava (Ukrainian: Манява, Polish: Maniawa) is a village of about 3,500 people located on the banks of the Maniavka River in Ivano-Frankivsk Raion, Ivano-Frankivsk Oblast of Western Ukraine. It is situated in the Ukrainian Carpathian Mountains. Maniava belongs to Solotvyn settlement hromada, one of the hromadas of Ukraine.

Until 18 July 2020, Maniava belonged to Bohorodchany Raion. The raion was abolished in July 2020 as part of the administrative reform of Ukraine, which reduced the number of raions of Ivano-Frankivsk Oblast to six. The area of Bohorodchany Raion was merged into Ivano-Frankivsk Raion.

The famous Orthodox Maniava Skete monastery is located on its outskirts, and the Maniava waterfall, with a height of 20 meters one of the highest waterfalls in Ukraine's Carpathian Mountains.

- Postal code is 77772
- Telephone code is +380 3471

== Sources ==
- Media related to Maniava at Wikimedia Commons
- Maniava, Western Ukraine
