= Uchan-su (waterfall) =

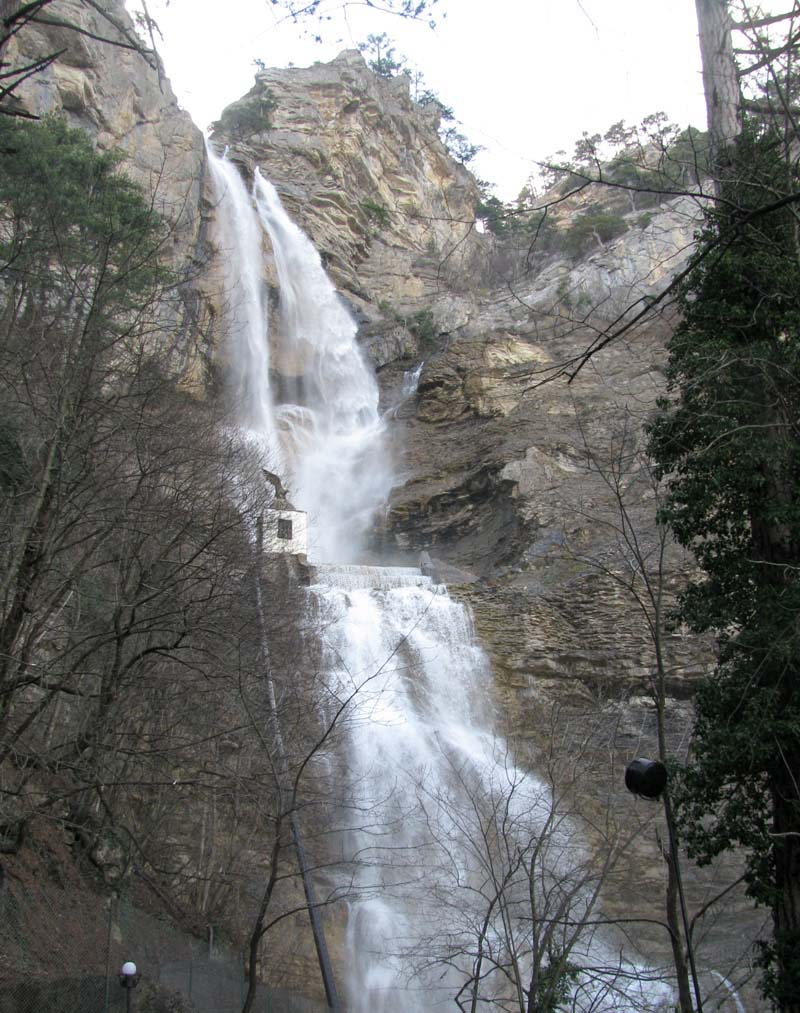

- Location within Crimea Location within Ukraine
- Location: Crimea
- Coordinates: 44°29′33″N 34°05′32″E
- Elevation: 390 metres (1,280 ft)
- Watercourse: Uchan-su

Uchan-su (Ukrainian: Учан-Су; Crimean Tatar: Uçan Suv) is a waterfall on the Uchan-su River on the southern slopes of the Crimean Mountains in Crimea. The name translates from the Crimean Tatar language for flying water.

Uchan-su, the highest waterfall in Crimea, is a popular tourist attraction located 7 km from the city of Yalta halfway to Ai-Petri Mountain. The waterfall is 98 metres (322 ft) high at an altitude of 390 metres (1,280 ft) and is most powerful during the spring when it is fed by snow melt in the mountains. The water originates from one of the Ai-Petri tops which falls onto the shallow water .

== See also ==
- List of waterfalls
- List of waterfalls in Ukraine
