= Uchan-su (river) =

Coordinates: 44°29′25″N 34°09′23″E

Uchan-su (Vodopadnaya)
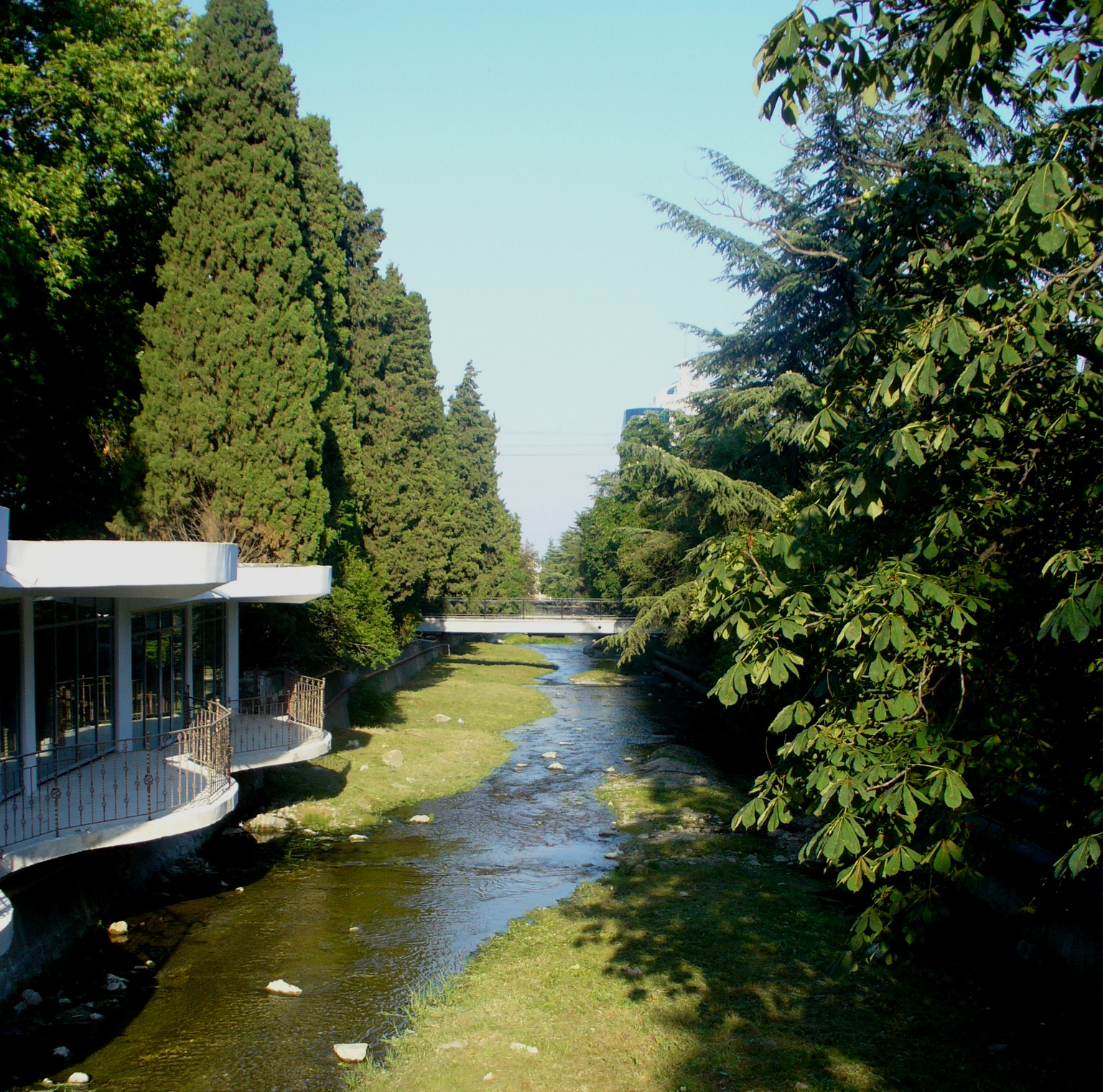
- Uchan-su river in Yalta, Crimea

Location
- Country: Ukraine

Physical characteristics
- Source
  - location: Ai-Petri
- Basin size: Black Sea

Uchan-su (Ukrainian: Учан-Су; Russian: Учан-Су; Crimean Tatar: Uçan Suv) or Vodopadnaya (Russian: Водопадная), is a river that flows in the South Coast of Crimea. The name translates from the Crimean Tatar language for 'swift water' .

The river runs into the Black Sea in the center city of Yalta. It begins at the foot of Ai-Petri, flows upstream the gorge and then at a distance of 2 km (1.2 mi) from the source forms the Uchan-su waterfall, located at an altitude of 390 meters (1,280 ft) and consists of several levels (the height of the waterfall is 98 meters (322 ft)).

The river water is used extensively for water supply and irrigation.

== See also ==
- Waterfalls of Ukraine
