= Mizhhiria Raion =

Former subdivision of Zakarpattia Oblast, Ukraine

Mizhhiria Raion Міжгірський район
- Raion
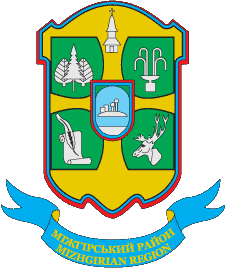
- Coat of arms

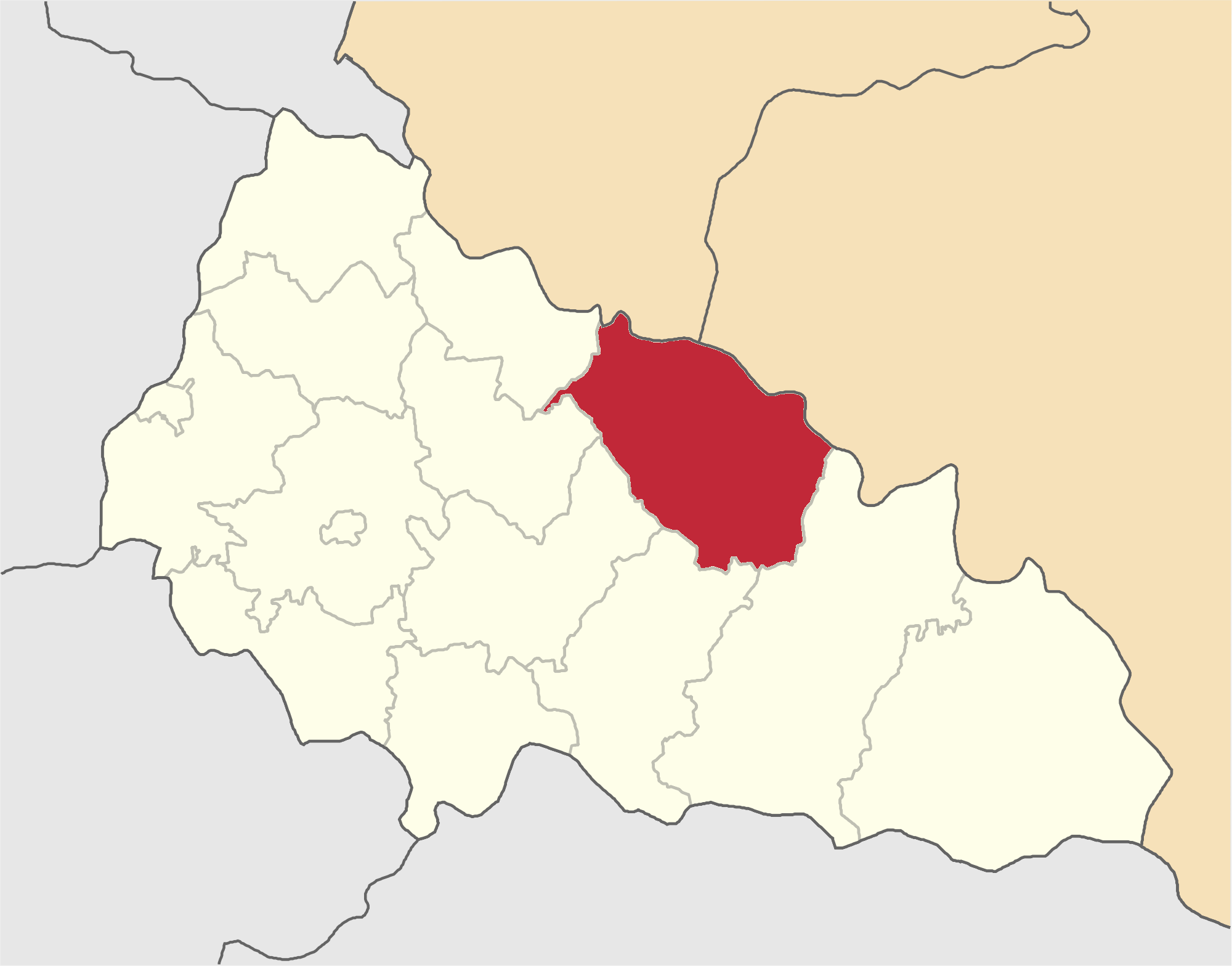
- Coordinates: 48°31′28.81″N 23°30′10.12″E
- Country: Ukraine
- Oblast: Zakarpattia Oblast
- Established: 1947
- Disestablished: 18 July 2020
- Admin. center: Mizhhiria
- Subdivisions: List: — city councils; — settlement councils; — rural councils; Number of localities: — cities; — urban-type settlements; 43 — villages; — rural settlements

Area
  - Total: 1,166 km^{2} (450 sq mi)

Population (2020)
  - Total: 47,360
  - Density: 40.62/km^{2} (105.2/sq mi)
- Time zone: UTC+02:00 (EET)
  - Summer (DST): UTC+03:00 (EEST)
- Area code: 380-3146
- Website: http://www.mizgir.com.ua/news.php Mizhhiria Raion

Mizhhiria Raion (Ukrainian: Міжгірський район) was a raion of Zakarpattia Oblast in western Ukraine. Its administrative center was the urban-type settlement of Mizhhiria. The raion was abolished and its territory was merged into Khust Raion on 18 July 2020 as part of the administrative reform of Ukraine, which reduced the number of raions of Zakarpattia Oblast to six. The last estimate of the raion population was 47,360 (2020 est.)

== See also ==
- Administrative divisions of Zakarpattia Oblast
