= Dunaivtsi (disambiguation) =

Dunaivtsi may refer to the following places in Khmelnytskyi Oblast, Ukraine:

- Dunaivtsi, Kamianets-Podilskyi Raion, a city
- Dunaivtsi (urban-type settlement), Kamianets-Podilskyi Raion
- Dunaivtsi Raion
