= Chervonohorod Castle =

Former defensive structure in Nyrkiv, Ternopil Oblast, Ukraine

- Nyrkiv, Chortkiv Raion, Ternopil Oblast
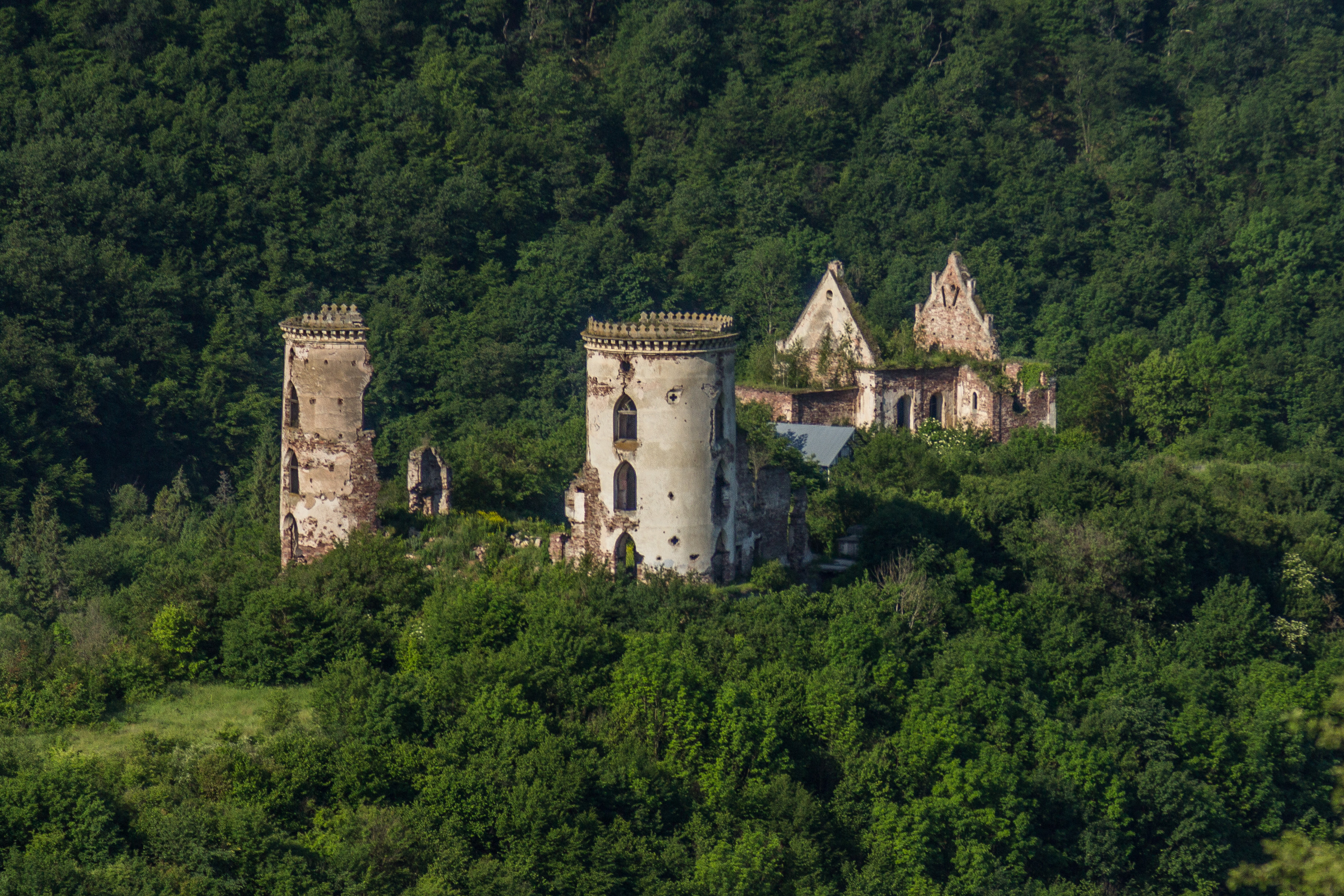
- Chervonohorod Castle, 2016

Site information
- Owner: Ukraine
- Condition: ruined

Location
- Coordinates: 48°48′14.5″N 25°35′48.5″E

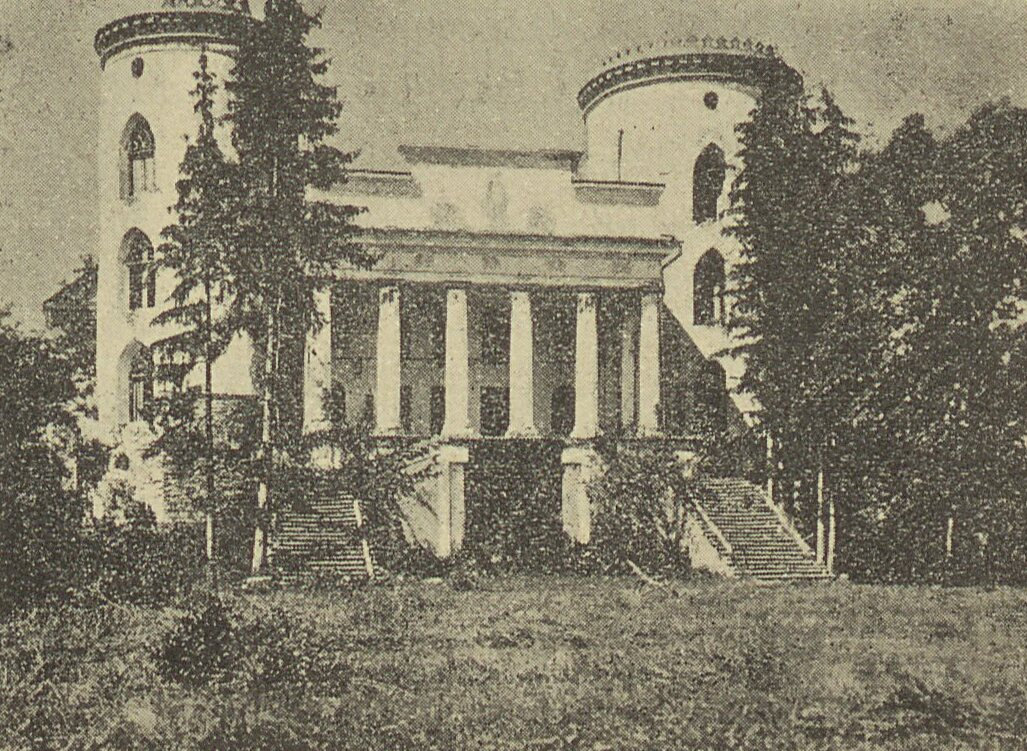
The castle before 1936

The Chervonohorod Castle (Ukrainian: Червоногородський замок, romanized: Chervonohorods'kyi zamok, lit. 'Red-city castle') is a former defensive structure in Ukraine that was rebuilt into a palace in the first half of the 19th century, an architectural monument of local importance.

It is located in the Chervone tract near the village of Nyrkiv, Chortkiv Raion, Ternopil Oblast, on a steep hill in the middle of the deep basin of the Dzhuryn River. Nearby are the Roman Catholic church, the Poniński chapel, and a waterfall.

== History ==
At the beginning of the 17th century, the owner of Chervonohorod, Lviv castellan Mikołaj Daniłowicz, built a brick quadrangular castle with towers on the corners, surrounded by a defensive wall with an entrance gate. During the National Liberation War led by Bohdan Khmelnytsky, in 1648 the castle was seized by rebel groups. In 1672, the castle was captured by the army of the Turkish Sultan Mehmed IV. After being repeatedly destroyed, the castle fell into disrepair.

From 1778 it was the property of Karol Poniński, who in 1820 ordered the dismantling of two towers and parts of the building, and used the other two towers and part of the walls to build a palace on the castle foundation. His son, Kalikst, considered the towers too low, dismantled them and built taller and more voluminous ones in the same place, in the pseudo-Gothic style.

Before World War I, the palace had an exquisite Italian-style terrace and a colonnade of 6 stone columns, and was surrounded by a large landscaped park with a fountain. During the World War I, the palace was heavily damaged and was never rebuilt. World War II completed the destruction. In February 1945, the palace was a place of defence of the Polish population against the Ukrainian Insurgent Army attack, during which 49 defenders were murdered.

Only two towers have survived, and they are heavily damaged; one of them partially collapsed in 2013. Now it is the property of the Ternopil Eparchy of the OCU.

== Sources ==
- (in Ukrainian) Безгубенко О., Мизак Н., Олійник, В., Нирків // Ternopil Oblast. History of cities and villages: in 3 v. / Ternopil: "Terno-graph", 2014, V. 2: Г—Л, S. 193—195. — ISBN 978-966-457-228-3.
- "Czerwonogród". Geographical Dictionary of the Kingdom of Poland (in Polish). 1. Warszawa: Kasa im. Józefa Mianowskiego. 1880. p. 845.
- Orłowicz M. Przewodnik po województwie Tarnopolskim, z mapą. — Tarnopol, 1928. — S. 106—109.
