= Czerwonogród =

Abolished locality in Ternopil Oblast, Ukraine

Chervonohorod Червоногород Chervone; Czerwonogród
- Former town
- Interactive map of Chervonohorod
- Coordinates: 48.8167°N 25.6°E
- Country: Ukraine
- Oblast: Ternopil Oblast
- Raion: Chortkiv Raion
- Chartered: 1434

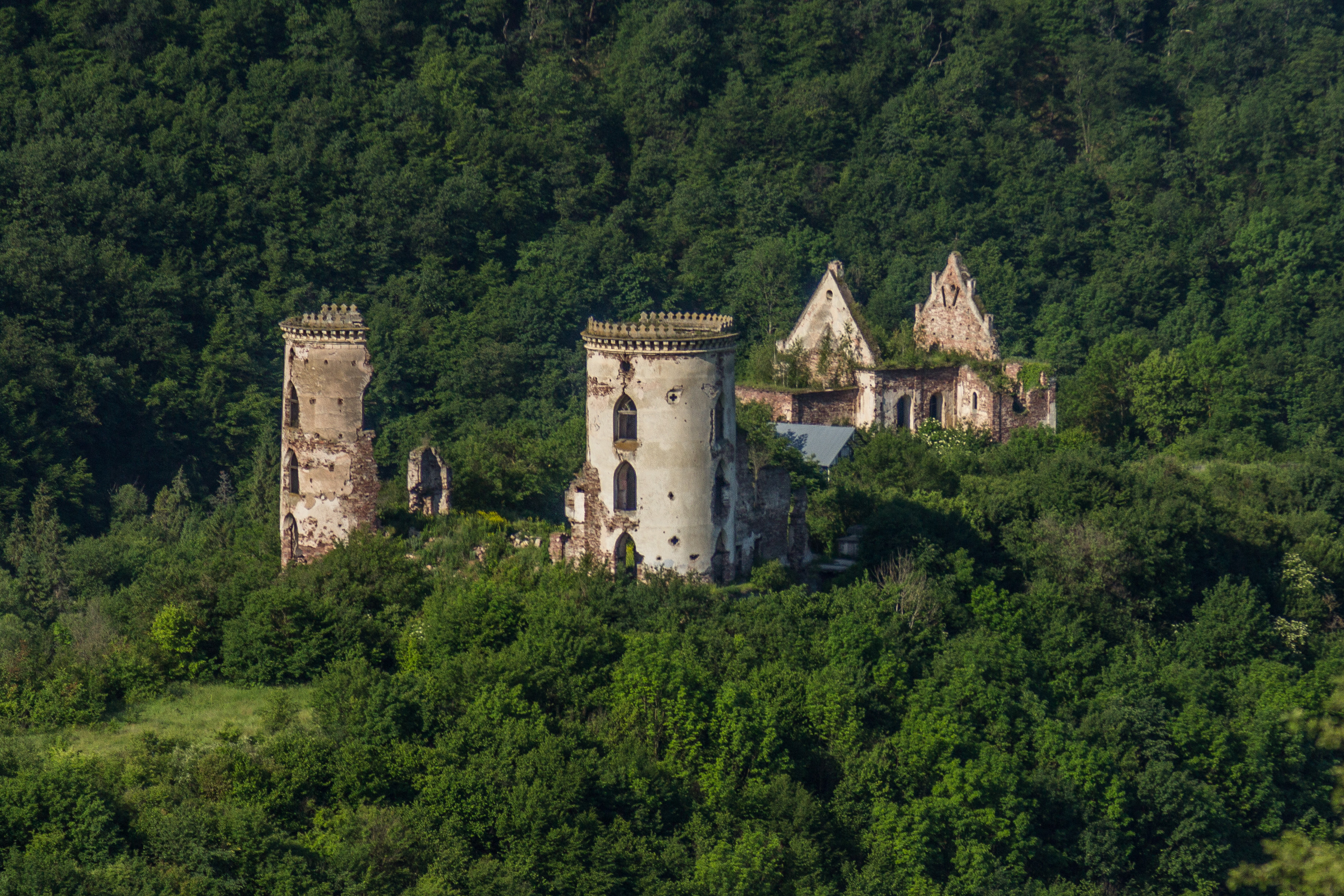
The ruins of Chervonohorod Castle.

Chervonohorod or Chervone (until 1970 Ukrainian: Червоне, formerly Ukrainian: Червоногород, Polish: Czerwonogród), meaning "Red Town" (from the color of the earth), is a former town in Zalishchyky Raion, Ternopil Oblast of Ukraine, that was part of the municipal district of Nyrkiv (Ни́рків).

It was chartered in 1434 and was the seat of a powiat in the Podole Voivodeship. During the 19th century Chervonohorod declined in importance, and its population was reduced to 500 by the time of the September Campaign (1939).

The local castle was built in the early 17th century as a seat of the Daniłowicz magnate family. Prince Poniński acquired the ruined castle from the Habsburgs in 1778 and had it demolished. A new princely residence was erected to replace it. The prince and his family were interred in the family vault, which boasted a relief commissioned from Bertel Thorvaldsen. Ukrainian nationalist civilians during World War 2 exterminated the ethnic Polish population and removed Czerwonogród from the map. Later, Soviets dismantled the Poniński-Lubomirski palace (apart from the two towers) and eventually abolished the locality.

== See also ==
- Church of the Assumption, Chervonohorod
