= Smotrych, Khmelnytskyi Oblast =

Rural locality in Khmelnytskyi Oblast, Ukraine

Smotrych Смотрич
- Rural settlement
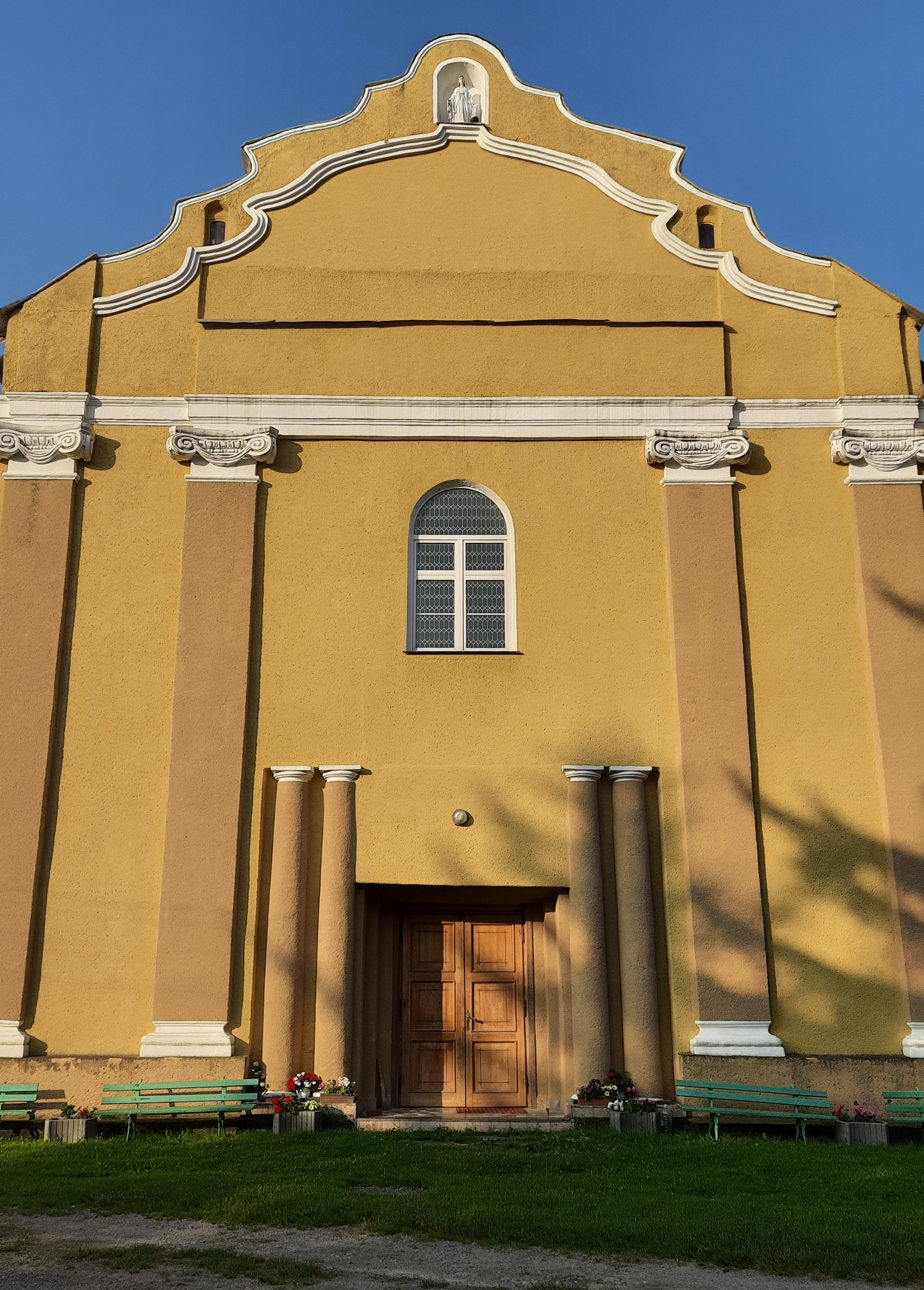
- Catholic Church

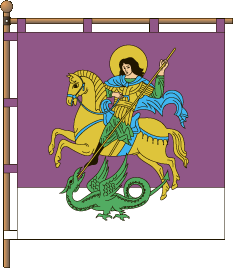
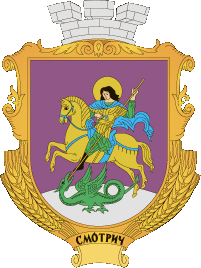
- Flag Coat of arms

- Location of Smotrych in Khmelnytskyi Oblast Location of Smotrych in Ukraine
- Coordinates: 48°56′49″N 26°33′37″E
- Country: Ukraine
- Oblast: Khmelnytskyi Oblast
- Raion: Kamianets-Podilskyi Raion
- Hromada: Smotrych or settlement hromada
- Magdeburg rights: 1448
- Town status: 1960

Government
  - Town Head: Liudmyla Pelykh

Area
  - Total: 5.02 km^{2} (1.94 sq mi)
- Elevation: 240 m (790 ft)

Population (2022)
  - Total: 1,739 ▼
  - Density: 346/km^{2} (897/sq mi)
- Time zone: UTC+2 (EET)
  - Summer (DST): UTC+3 (EEST)
- Postal code: 32423
- Area code: +380 3858
- Website: http://rada.gov.ua/

Smotrych (Ukrainian: Смотрич; Polish: Smotrycz; Yiddish: סמאָטריטש) is a rural settlement in Kamianets-Podilskyi Raion, Khmelnytskyi Oblast, western Ukraine. Smotrych hosts the administration of Smotrych settlement hromada, one of the hromadas of Ukraine. The town's population was 2,102 as of the 2001 Ukrainian Census. Current population: 1,739 (2022 estimate). It is located in the historic region of Podolia.

== History ==
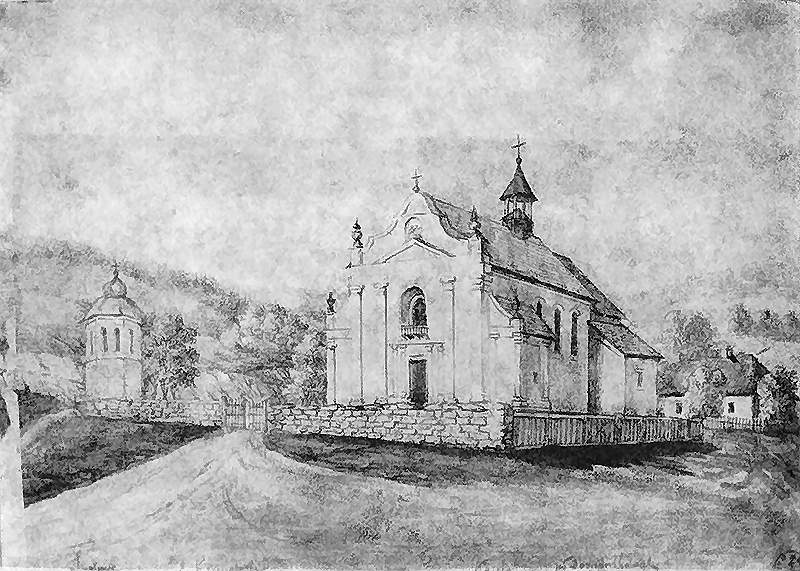
The local Catholic church on a watercolor painting by Napoleon Orda from 1871

Following the Lithuanian victory over the Golden Horde at the Battle of Blue Waters, the territory was captured by Duke Algirdas of Lithuania, who appointed the Koriatovich princes, a branch of the ruling Lithuanian Gediminid dynasty, as administrators. Brothers Alexander and George Koriatovich erected a castle that became their regional headquarters, and a settlement developed around it. In 1375, Alexander granted privilege to the Dominicans, and then was buried in the Dominican church after his death in 1392.

In 1430, Smotrycz passed to the Kingdom of Poland, confirmed by the 1431 truce between Polish King Władysław II Jagiełło and Lithuanian Duke Švitrigaila. It was granted Magdeburg rights in 1448 by King Casimir IV Jagiellon, and became a royal town, administratively located in the Podolian Voivodeship in the Lesser Poland Province. The old castle was apparently either damaged or destroyed, because in 1518 King Sigismund I the Old allowed the construction of a new castle to defend against potential Tatar invasions and exempted the town from taxes for two years.

After the Second Partition of Poland in 1793, the town was annexed by Russia. Between 1917 and 1920, it was at various times under Ukrainian, Polish and Soviet control. During World War II, it was occupied by Nazi Germany from 1941 to 1944.

In 1960, Smotrych was granted the status of an urban-type settlement. The town lies on the banks of the Smotrych River.

Until 18 July 2020, Smotrych belonged to Dunaivtsi Raion. The raion was abolished in July 2020 as part of the administrative reform of Ukraine, which reduced the number of raions of Khmelnytskyi Oblast to three. The area of Dunaivtsi Raion was merged into Kamianets-Podilskyi Raion.

Until 26 January 2024, Smotrych was designated an urban-type settlement. On this day, a new law entered into force which abolished this status, and Smotrych became a rural settlement.

== Demographics ==
As of the 2001 Ukrainian census, the town had a population of 2,102 inhabitants. The linguistic makeup of the population was:

Native languages in Smotrych
	percent
Ukrainian	97.6%
Russian	1.1%
Hungarian	1.0%
Polish	0.1%
Romanian	0.1%
others	0.1%

== People from Smotrich ==
- Meletius Smotrytsky (1577-1633), religious and pedagogical activist of the Polish–Lithuanian Commonwealth, Ruthenian linguist
- Bezalel Smotrich, who is of Ukrainian-Jewish heritage, is the 28th Israeli Finance Minister and chairman of Israeli religious Zionist party National Religious Party-Religious Zionist Party (merger of RZP, The Jewish Home and Otzma), current member of the Israeli coalition.

== See also ==
- Dunaivtsi, the other urban-type settlement in Dunaivtsi Raion
