= Church of the Assumption, Chervonohorod =

Church in Ternopil Oblast, Ukraine

Church of the Assumption Костел Небовзяття Пресвятої Діви Марії
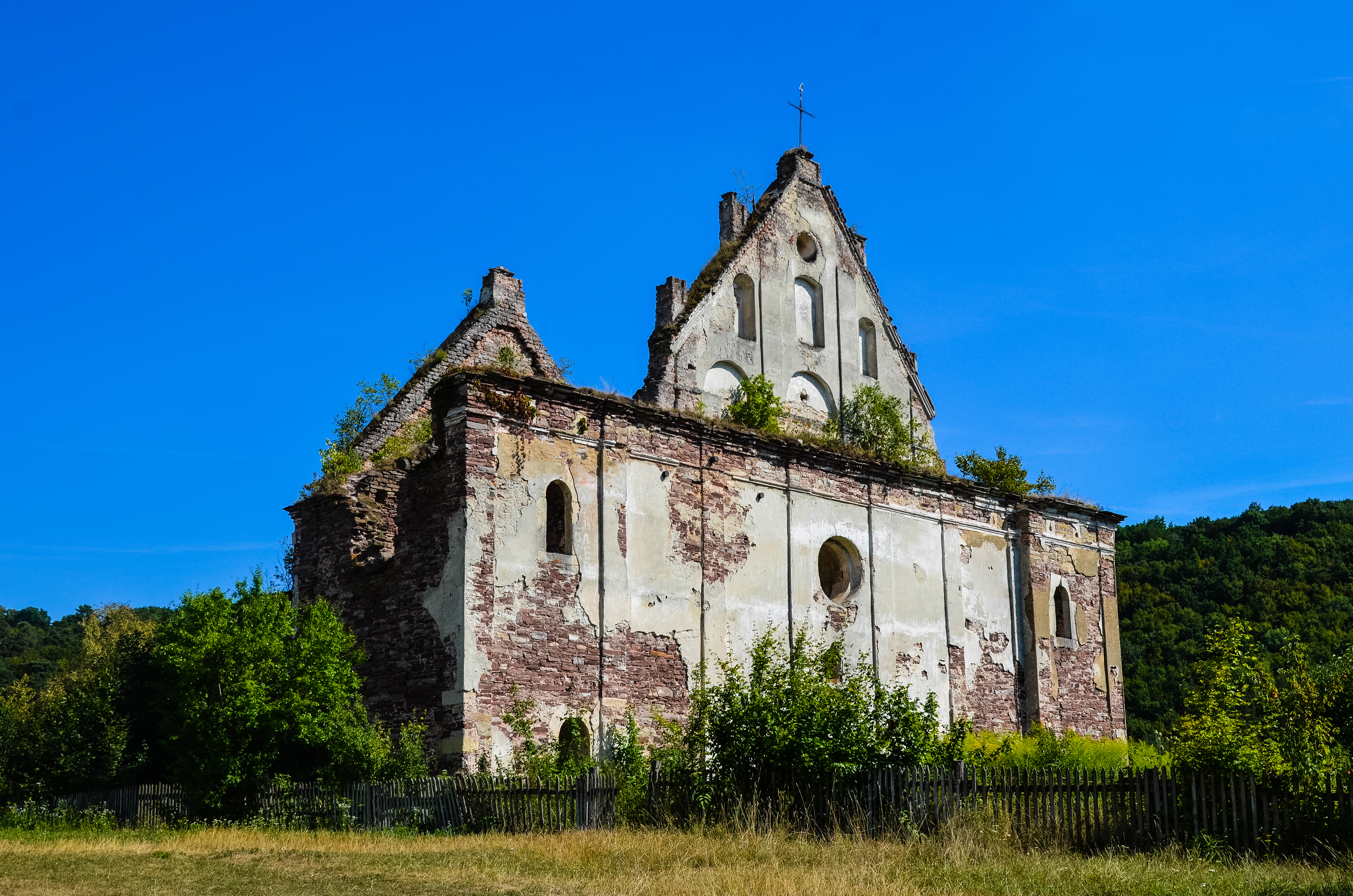

- Location within Ternopil Oblast

Religion
- Affiliation: Roman Catholic Church

Location
- Location: Chervonohorod (now part of Nyrkiv)
- Interactive map of Church of the Assumption; Костел Небовзяття Пресвятої Діви Марії
- Coordinates: 48°48′11″N 25°35′40″E

Architecture
- Completed: 1615

Church of the Assumption (Ukrainian: Костел Небовзяття Пресвятої Діви Марії) Roman Catholic Church (RCC) in Nyrkiv of the Tovste settlement hromada of the Chortkiv Raion of the Ternopil Oblast, and an architectural monument of local significance.

== History ==
It was built in 1615 at the expense of the Lisiecki family.

In 1716, it was rebuilt and acquired its current outline. It was dedicated in 1741 by Bishop Ordinarius of Kamianets-Podilskyi Wacław Hieronim Sierakowski. In 1748, the property situation of the parish improved thanks to donations from Rafał Skarbek and Adam Bielski.

In 1935 the church was set on fire. The parishioners who were resettled to Poland took with them the miraculous image of the Mother of God of Chervonohorod.

Today it is in a state of ruin.

== Priests ==
- о. Ignacy Frankowski,
- о. Jan Głębocki (1874–1899),
- о. Stefan Jurasz (1930s).

== Sources ==
- "Від Трипілля до Тернопілля. Мандрівка до міста, якого нема на карті". Укрінформ. 2017-08-25.
- "Червоногород: мандрівка до міста-привида з давньоруською історією". День.
