= Dunaivtsi, Novodunaivtsi settlement hromada, Kamianets-Podilskyi Raion, Khmelnytskyi Oblast =

Rural settlement in Khmelnytskyi Oblast, Ukraine

Dunaivtsi Дунаївці
- Rural settlement
- Dunaivtsi
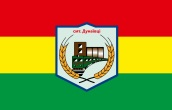
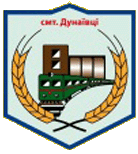
- Flag Coat of arms

- Location within Khmelnytskyi Oblast Location within Ukraine
- Coordinates: 49°01′14″N 26°50′17″E
- Country: Ukraine
- Oblast: Khmelnytskyi Oblast
- Raion: Kamianets-Podilskyi Raion
- Hromada: Novodunaivtsi settlement hromada

Area
  - Total: 2.83 km^{2} (1.09 sq mi)

Population (2001)
  - Total: 2,755
  - Density: 973.5/km^{2} (2,521/sq mi)
- Postal code: 32413
- Area code: +380 3858
- Website: rada.gov.ua

Dunaivtsi (Ukrainian: Дунаївці) is a rural settlement in Kamianets-Podilskyi Raion, Khmelnytskyi Oblast, Ukraine. Dunaivtsi hosts the administration of Novodunaivtsi settlement hromada, one of the hromadas of Ukraine. According to the 2001 census, its population was 2 755 inhabitants. Current population: 2,297 (2022 estimate).

== History ==
Until 18 July 2020, Dunaivtsi belonged to Dunaivtsi Raion. The raion was abolished in July 2020 as part of the administrative reform of Ukraine, which reduced the number of raions of Khmelnytskyi Oblast to three. The area of Dunaivtsi Raion was merged into Kamianets-Podilskyi Raion.

Until 26 January 2024, Dunaivtsi was designated urban-type settlement. On this day, a new law entered into force which abolished this status, and Dunaivtsi became a rural settlement.

== Transportation ==
A railway station of the Yarmolyntsi—Larga railroad is located in the town. Founded in 1914, Dunaivtsi received the status of the urban-type settlement in 1972.

Dunaivtsi is 22 km from the city of Dunaivtsi.

== See also ==
- Smotrych, the other urban-type settlement in Dunaivtsi Raion
