= Pavlo Hai-Nyzhnyk =

Ukrainian historian and poet (born 1971)

- Павло Гай-Нижник
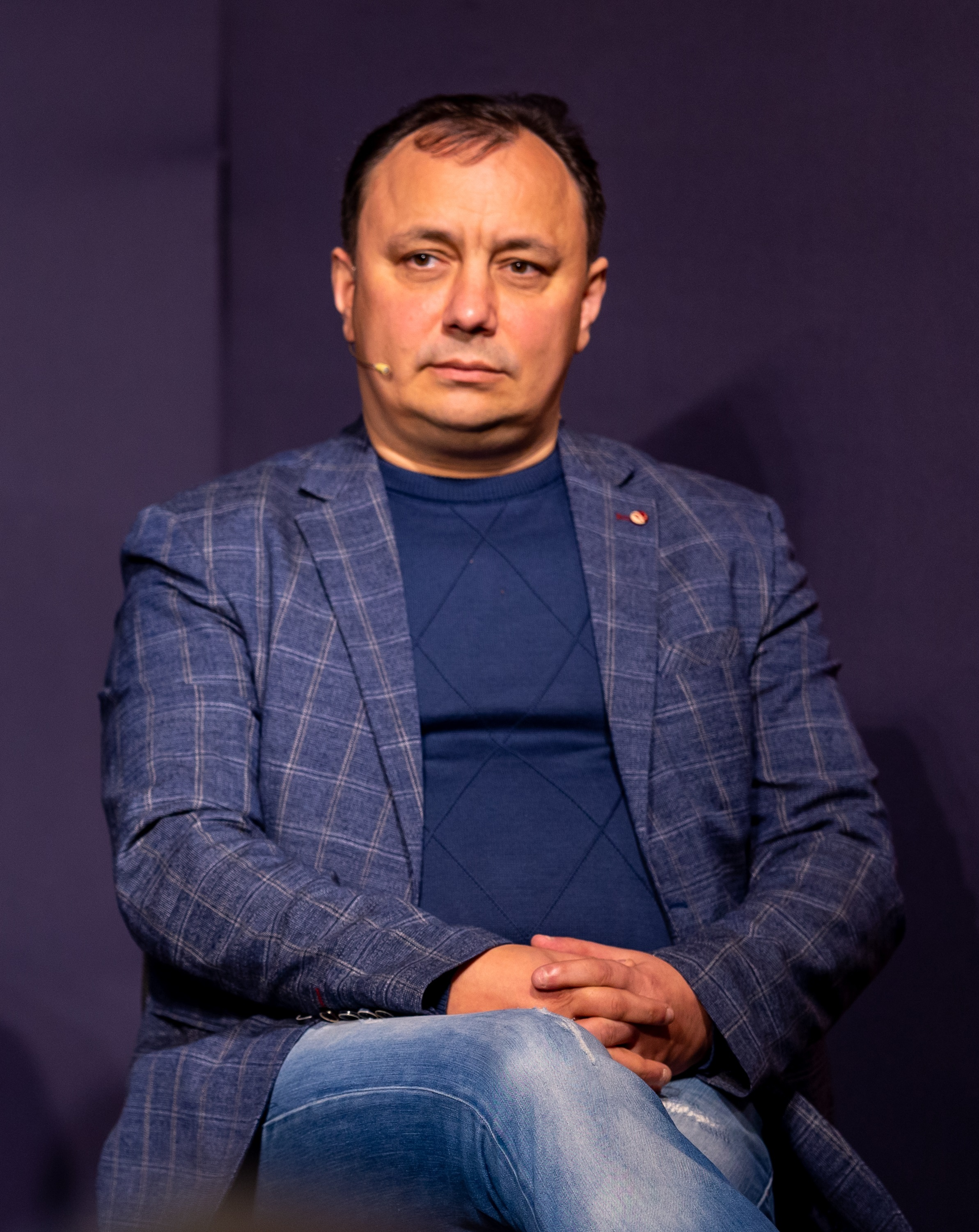
- Hai-Nyzhnyk in 2022
- Born: 28 May 1971 (age 55); Dunaivtsi, Khmelnytskyi Oblast, Ukrainian SSR, Soviet Union
- Awards: Ivan Koshelivets International Literary Prize (2013)

Academic background
- Education: Kamianets-Podilskyi Pedagogical Institute; Taras Shevchenko National University of Kyiv
- Theses: Financial policy of the government of the Ukrainian State of Hetman Pavlo Skoropadskyi (29 April – 14 December 1918) (2000); Financial policy of the Central Rada and the governments of the Ukrainian People's Republic (March 1917 – April 1918) (2008)

Academic work
- Discipline: History
- Sub-discipline: Political and financial history of Ukraine, 1917–1921
- Institutions: Research Institute of Ukrainian Studies; I. F. Kuras Institute of Political and Ethnic Studies, NASU

Pavlo Pavlovych Hai-Nyzhnyk (Ukrainian: Павло Павлович Гай-Нижник; born 28 May 1971) is a Ukrainian historian and poet. A Doctor of Historical Sciences, he specialises in the history of Ukraine in the first half of the 20th century, particularly the state-building and financial policy of the Ukrainian governments of 1917–1921. He is deputy director of the Research Institute of Ukrainian Studies of the Ministry of Education and Science of Ukraine.

== Early life and education ==
Hai-Nyzhnyk was born on 28 May 1971 in Dunaivtsi, a small town in Podolia. During perestroika he took part in the Ukrainian independence movement, and from 1986 to 1989 he founded and led a nationalist youth organisation in Dunaivtsi, the Union of the Ukrainian Nation. In 1988 he hoisted the then-banned Ukrainian national flag on the chimney of the Lenin clothing factory in Dunaivtsi.

From 1989 to 1991 he studied at the Donetsk Higher Military-Political School of Engineering and Signal Troops. He graduated from the history faculty of the Kamianets-Podilskyi Pedagogical Institute in 1995 and completed postgraduate studies at the M. S. Hrushevsky Institute of Ukrainian Archaeography and Source Studies of the National Academy of Sciences of Ukraine in 1998.

In 2000 he received the degree of Candidate of Historical Sciences from Taras Shevchenko National University of Kyiv with a thesis on the financial policy of the Ukrainian State under Hetman Pavlo Skoropadskyi. He completed doctoral studies at the same university and in 2008 was awarded the degree of Doctor of Historical Sciences for a dissertation on the financial policy of the Central Rada and the governments of the Ukrainian People's Republic from March 1917 to April 1918.

== Career ==
Hai-Nyzhnyk has worked at the Hrushevsky Institute of Ukrainian Archaeography and Source Studies, the Research Financial Institute of the Ministry of Finance of Ukraine, the Ukrainian Research Institute of Archival Affairs and Records Management, the Institute of Social Transformation, Kryvyi Rih State Pedagogical University, the National Academy of the State Tax Service of Ukraine, and the I. F. Kuras Institute of Political and Ethnic Studies of the National Academy of Sciences of Ukraine, where he was a senior research fellow. He later headed the Department of Historical Studies at the Research Institute of Ukrainian Studies in Kyiv and became the institute's deputy director.

He is a member (academician) of the Ukrainian Academy of Sciences, a non-governmental body distinct from the National Academy of Sciences of Ukraine, and of the Academy of Political Sciences in Kyiv.

== Research ==
His research covers the history of Ukraine in the first half of the 20th century, Ukrainian political history, the Ukrainian struggle for independence of 1917–1921, the history of Ukrainian socio-economic and financial policy, and biographical studies. His early monographs, based largely on archival documents, deal with the fiscal, tax and banking policy of the Central Rada, the Hetmanate and the Directorate, and were listed in the annual survey of new literature published by the Financial History Review.

His later work extends to the formation of state institutions in the Ukrainian People's Republic and the West Ukrainian People's Republic, the history of the civil service in Ukraine, Ukrainian party politics since independence, the Christianisation of Kievan Rus', and Russian–Ukrainian relations since 1990, including the Russo-Ukrainian War.

By his own account he is the author of more than 1,000 scholarly publications.

== Awards ==
- Order of St. Volodymyr the Great, 3rd class (2006)
- Certificate of honour of the Ministry of Education and Science of Ukraine (2007)
- Ivan Koshelivets International Literary Prize (2013)

== Selected works ==
=== Monographs ===
- Документальні джерела і матеріали до історії фінансової політики уряду Української Держави (29 квітня – 14 грудня 1918 р.) [Documentary sources and materials on the history of the financial policy of the government of the Ukrainian State, 29 April – 14 December 1918]. Kyiv, 2004. 47 pp.
- Фінансова політика уряду Української Держави Гетьмана Павла Скоропадського (29 квітня – 14 грудня 1918 р.) [Financial policy of the government of Hetman Pavlo Skoropadskyi's Ukrainian State, 29 April – 14 December 1918]. Kyiv, 2004. 430 pp.
- Податкова політика Центральної Ради, урядів УНР, Української Держави, УСРР (1917–1930 рр.) [Tax policy of the Central Rada and the governments of the UPR, the Ukrainian State and the Ukrainian SSR, 1917–1930]. Kyiv: Tsyfra-druk, 2006. 303 pp.
- Український Державний банк: історія становлення. Документи і матеріали (1917–1918 рр.) [The Ukrainian State Bank: history of its formation. Documents and materials, 1917–1918]. Kyiv: Tsyfra-druk, 2007. 340 pp.
- УНР та ЗУНР: становлення органів влади і національне державотворення (1917–1920 рр.) [The UPR and the WUPR: formation of government bodies and national state-building, 1917–1920]. Kyiv: ShcheK, 2010. 304 pp.
- Час на зміни (політична публіцистика та інтерв'ю за 2010–2013 рр.) [Time for change: political essays and interviews, 2010–2013]. Kyiv, 2013. 258 pp.
- Українська дипломатія й міжнародна фінансова політика урядів Центральної Ради, Української Держави (Гетьманату) та Директорії УНР (1917–1922 рр.) [Ukrainian diplomacy and the international financial policy of the governments of the Central Rada, the Ukrainian State (Hetmanate) and the UPR Directorate, 1917–1922]. Kyiv: Duliby, 2016. 532 pp.
- Росія проти України (1990–2016 рр.): від політики шантажу і примусу до війни на поглинання та спроби знищення [Russia against Ukraine, 1990–2016: from a policy of blackmail and coercion to a war of absorption and attempted destruction]. Kyiv: MP Lesia, 2017. 332 pp.

=== Co-authored and edited works ===
- Науково-документальна збірка до 90-річчя запровадження державної служби в Україні [Scholarly documentary collection for the 90th anniversary of the introduction of the civil service in Ukraine]. With V. Verstiuk, S. Konyk et al. Kyiv, 2008. 124 pp.
- Нариси історії державної служби в Україні [Essays on the history of the civil service in Ukraine]. Kyiv: Nika-Tsentr, 2008. 536 pp.
- Банківська система України: виміри глобальної фінансової кризи [The banking system of Ukraine: dimensions of the global financial crisis]. Expert-analytical report. Kyiv: Dorado-druk, 2009. 64 pp.
- Історія державної служби в Україні [History of the civil service in Ukraine]. 5 vols. Kyiv: Nika-Tsentr, 2009. Vol. 1, 544 pp.; vol. 2, 512 pp.
- Економічна безпека банківської системи в контексті нового курсу реформ в Україні в 2010–2015 роках [Economic security of the banking system in the context of the new course of reforms in Ukraine, 2010–2015]. Expert-analytical report. Kyiv: Dorado-druk, 2010. 64 pp.
- Держава, влада та громадянське суспільство у документах політичних партій України (кінець 1980-х – перша половина 2011 рр.) [The state, government and civil society in the documents of Ukraine's political parties, late 1980s – first half of 2011]. Kyiv: Kuras IPiEND, 2011. 808 pp.
- Українська багатопартійність: політичні партії, виборчі блоки, лідери (кінець 1980-х – початок 2012 рр.) [Ukrainian multi-party system: political parties, electoral blocs, leaders, late 1980s – early 2012]. Encyclopedic reference. Kyiv: Kuras IPiEND, 2012. 588 pp.
- Україна за двадцять років [Ukraine over twenty years]. Proceedings of the international web conference of 22 August 2011. Chernihiv, 2013. 48 pp.
- With Oleksii Leiberov. УНР у період Директорії: пошук моделі державного устрою (кінець 1918 – 1919 рр.) [The UPR in the Directorate period: the search for a model of state structure, late 1918 – 1919]. Nizhyn, 2013. 212 pp.
- Політичні партії України у парламентській виборчій кампанії 2012 року [Political parties of Ukraine in the 2012 parliamentary election campaign]. Kyiv: Kuras IPiEND, 2013. 400 pp.
- Українознавство: концептуальні та теоретико-методологічні основи розвитку [Ukrainian studies: conceptual, theoretical and methodological foundations of development]. Project leader. Kyiv, 2015. 504 pp.
- With Oleh Batrak. Догматика віри в Кафолічній Церкві й запровадження християнства у Давній Русі (кінець ІХ – середина ХІ ст.) [Dogmatics of faith in the universal Church and the introduction of Christianity in ancient Rus', late 9th – mid-11th century]. Kyiv: MP Lesia, 2015. 278 pp.
- Російська окупація і деокупація України: історія, сучасні загрози та виклики сьогодення [Russian occupation and the de-occupation of Ukraine: history, current threats and challenges]. Conference proceedings, editor. Kyiv: MP Lesia, 2016. 352 pp.
- Агресія Росії проти України: історичні передумови та сучасні виклики [Russia's aggression against Ukraine: historical background and current challenges]. Project leader and editor. Kyiv: MP Lesia, 2016. 586 pp.
- Агресія Російської Федерації проти України: проблеми оптимізації державного управління та системи національної безпеки [Aggression of the Russian Federation against Ukraine: problems of optimising public administration and the national security system]. Expert-analytical report, project leader. Kyiv: MP Lesia, 2016. 28 pp.

=== Poetry ===
- Згадуй мене... Лірика кохання [Remember me... Love lyrics]. Kyiv, 2006. 114 pp.
- Смак свободи... Лірика життя [Taste of freedom... Lyrics of life]. Kyiv, 2009. 95 pp.
- Плинність [Flow]. Kyiv, 2015. 97 pp.

His poems have also appeared in the anthologies Vilah pochuttiv (Uzhhorod, 2012) and Voinam svitla (Uzhhorod, 2015), and in the Israeli Ukrainian-language journal Sobornist (2013).
