= Dzhuryn (river) =

River in Ternopil Oblast, Ukraine

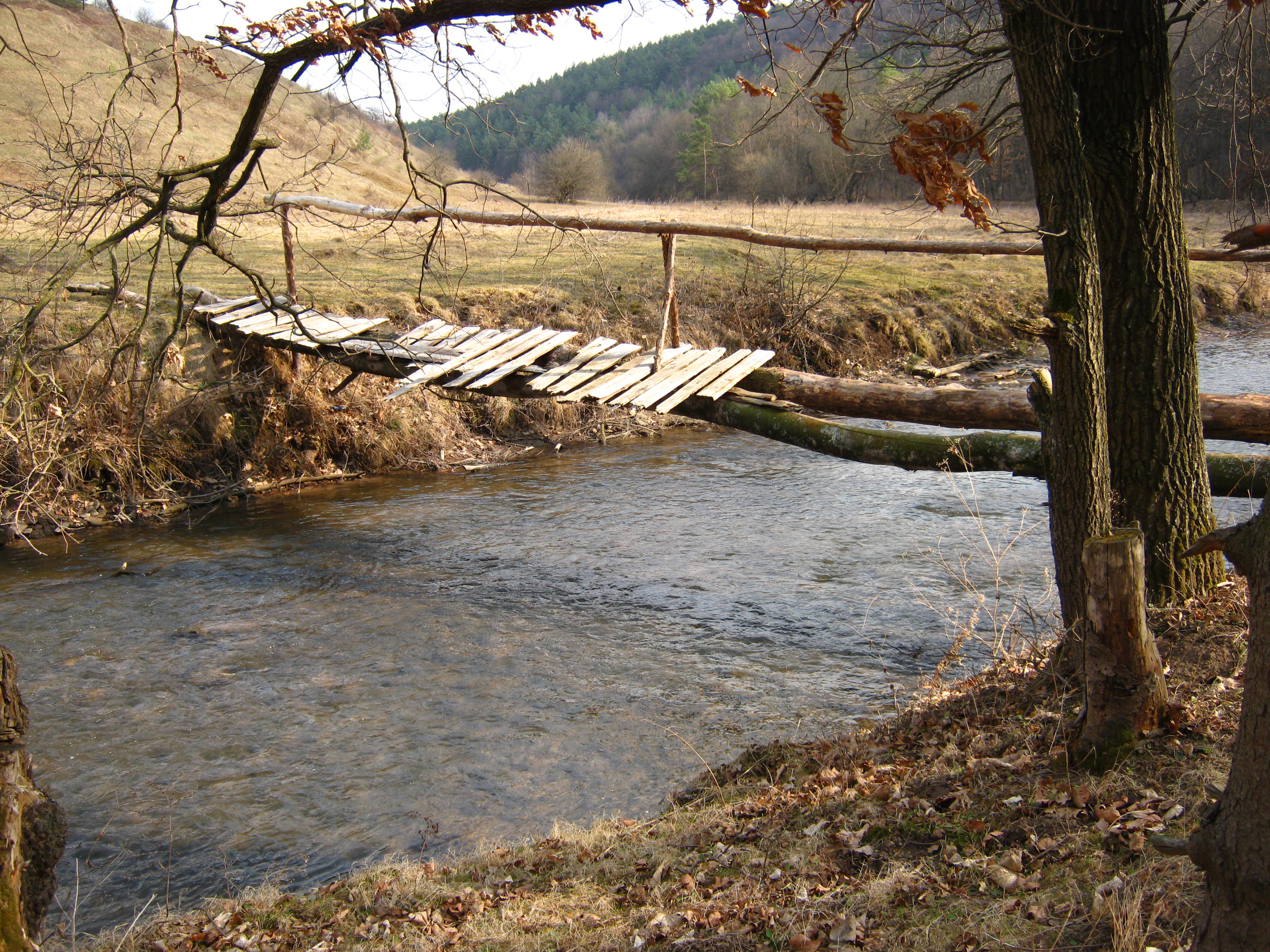
- Dzhuryn River near Nyrkiv
- Native name: Джурин (Ukrainian)

Location
- Country: Ukraine

Physical characteristics
- Source
  - location: near Martynivka
  - coordinates: 49°02′56″N 25°34′26″E
- Mouth: Dniester
  - coordinates: 48°46′08″N 25°35′52″E
- Length: 51 km (32 mi)

Basin features
- Progression: Dniester→ Dniester Estuary→ Black Sea

Dzhuryn (Ukrainian: Джурин) is a river in Ukraine, which flows within the Chortkiv Raion of Ternopil Oblast. Left tributary of the river Dniester from the Black Sea basin. The river has the highest Chervonohradskyi waterfall on the plain rivers of Ukraine.

It is 51 km long and covers an area of 301 km^{2}. The leakage begins on the Podolian Upland, near Martynivka, Chortkiv Raion.

== Sources ==
- Каталог річок України. — К. : — Видавництво АН УРСР, 1957.
- Географічна енциклопедія України : [у 3 т.] / редкол.: О. М. Маринич (відповід. ред.) та ін. — К., 1989–1993. — 33 000 екз. — ISBN 5-88500-015-8.
- "Dzuryn". Geographical Dictionary of the Kingdom of Poland (in Polish). 2. Warszawa: Kasa im. Józefa Mianowskiego. 1881. p. 305.
- "Словник гідронімів України" (PDF). — К.: Наукова думка, 1979. — S. 169.
