= Dzhurynskyi =

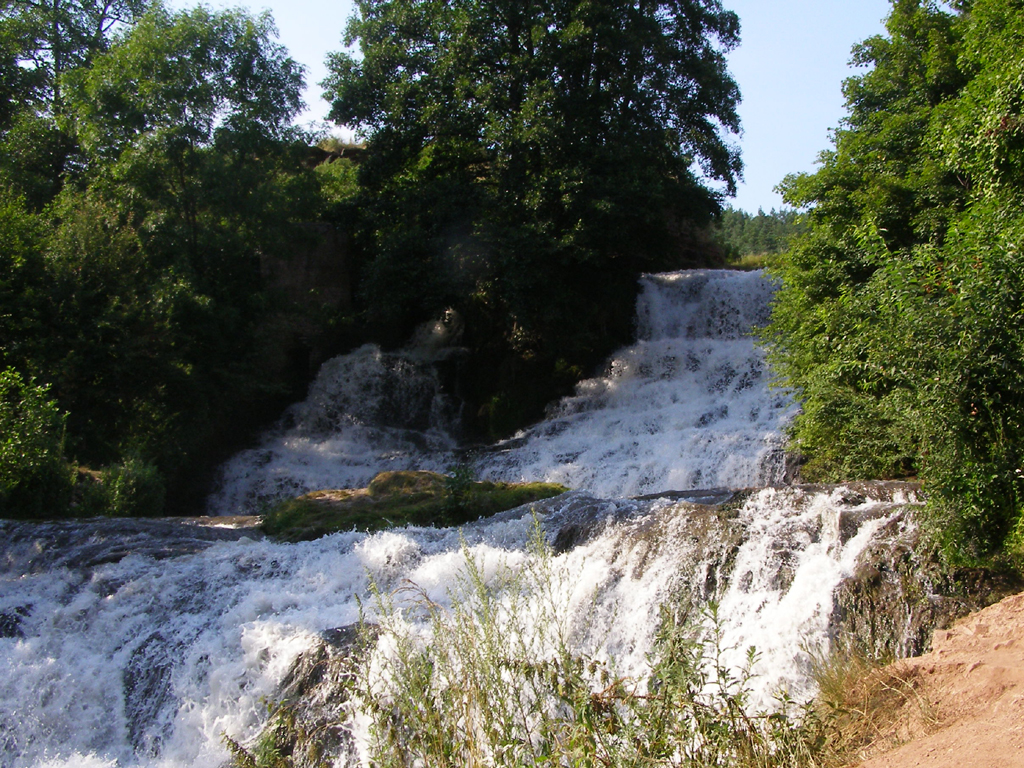

- Location within Ternopil Oblast Location within Ukraine
- Location: Nyrkiv village, Chortkiv Raion, Ternopil Oblast, Ukraine
- Coordinates: 48°48′22″N 25°35′02″E
- Total height: 16 metres (52 ft)
- Number of drops: 3
- Total width: 20 metres (66 ft)
- Watercourse: Dzhuryn river

Dzhurynskyi (Ukrainian: Джуринський) or the Chervonohorodskyi waterfall (Ukrainian: Червоногородський водоспад) is located on the Dzhuryn river in Nyrkiv village, Chortkiv Raion, Ternopil Oblast of western Ukraine Waterfall is 16 metres (52 ft) high and 20 metres (66 ft) wide.

This is the most powerful waterfall in Ukraine. Dzhurynskyi Canyon, which is home Dzhurynskyi Fall, is a local natural landmark.

== Characteristics ==
The total height of the waterfall is 16 m (52 ft), the width is up to 20 m (66 ft), and the number of cascades is 3.

The area of the natural monument is 0.7 hectares (1.7 acres). By the decision of the Executive Committee of the Ternopil Regional Council No. 537 of October 23, 1972, it was declared a nature reserve. It is managed by the local peasant union.

The waterfall has scientific, aesthetic, and educational value and is one of the most attractive tourist attractions in Ternopil region. On warm days, people not only from the Ternopil region, but also tourists from all over Ukraine and abroad swim and relax here.

== Interesting facts ==
Chervonohorodskyi waterfall is considered the highest plain waterfall in Ukraine.

Until the early 1950s, a water mill operated at the waterfall, and from the early 1950s to the early 1960s, a hydroelectric power plant (at that time, there was even a Chervonohorodske reservoir nearby).

== See also ==
- List of waterfalls
- Waterfalls of Ukraine
