= Dunaivtsi Raion =

Former subdivision of Khmelnytskyi Oblast, Ukraine

Dunaivtsi Raion Дунаєвецький район
- Raion
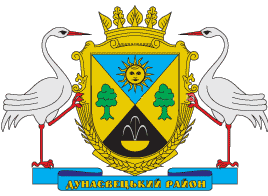
- Flag Coat of arms

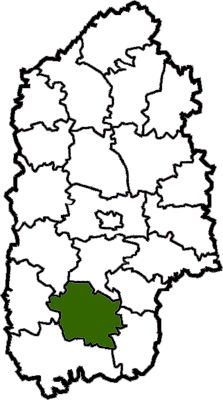
- Coordinates: 48°55′34″N 26°49′23″E
- Country: Ukraine
- Region: Khmelnytskyi Oblast
- Established: 1923
- Disestablished: 18 July 2020
- Admin. center: Dunaivtsi
- Subdivisions: List: 1 — city councils; 2 — settlement councils; 43 — rural councils; Number of localities: 1 — cities; 2 — urban-type settlements; 83 — villages; 0 — rural settlements

Government
  - Governor: Yuriy V. Kucheryavyi

Area
  - Total: 1,180 km^{2} (460 sq mi)

Population (2020)
  - Total: 59,576
  - Density: 50.5/km^{2} (131/sq mi)
- Time zone: UTC+02:00 (EET)
  - Summer (DST): UTC+03:00 (EEST)
- Postal index: 32400–32473
- Area code: 380-3858
- Website: www.rda.dn.km.ua

Dunaivtsi Raion (Ukrainian: Дунаєвецький район) was a raion in Khmelnytskyi Oblast in Ukraine. Its administrative center was Dunaivtsi. It was established in 1923. The raion was abolished on 18 July 2020 as part of the administrative reform of Ukraine, which reduced the number of raions of Khmelnytskyi Oblast to three. The area of Dunaivtsi Raion was merged into Kamianets-Podilskyi Raion. The last estimate of the raion population was 59,576 (2020 est.)

== Geography ==
Dunaivtsi Raion was a part of Podolia. It was one out 20 Raions of Khmelnytskyi Oblast. It was a large raion and ranked as the 5th among the largest with respect to the total area (1 182 km^{2} corresponding to 5.7% of the total area of Khmelnytskyi Oblast).

== Subdivisions ==
At the time of disestablishment, the raion consisted of four hromadas:

- Dunaivtsi urban hromada with the administration in the city of Dunaivtsi;
- Makiv rural hromada with the administration in the selo of Makiv;
- Novodunaivtsi settlement hromada with the administration in the urban-type settlement of Dunaivtsi;
- Smotrych settlement hromada with the administration in the urban-type settlement of Smotrych.

1 city (Dunaivtsi), 2 urban-type settlements (Dunaivtsi and Smotrych) and 83 villages were located in Dunaivtsi Raion.
