= Dunaivtsi =

City in Khmelnytskyi Oblast, Ukraine

Dunaivtsi Дунаївці Dunajowce
- City
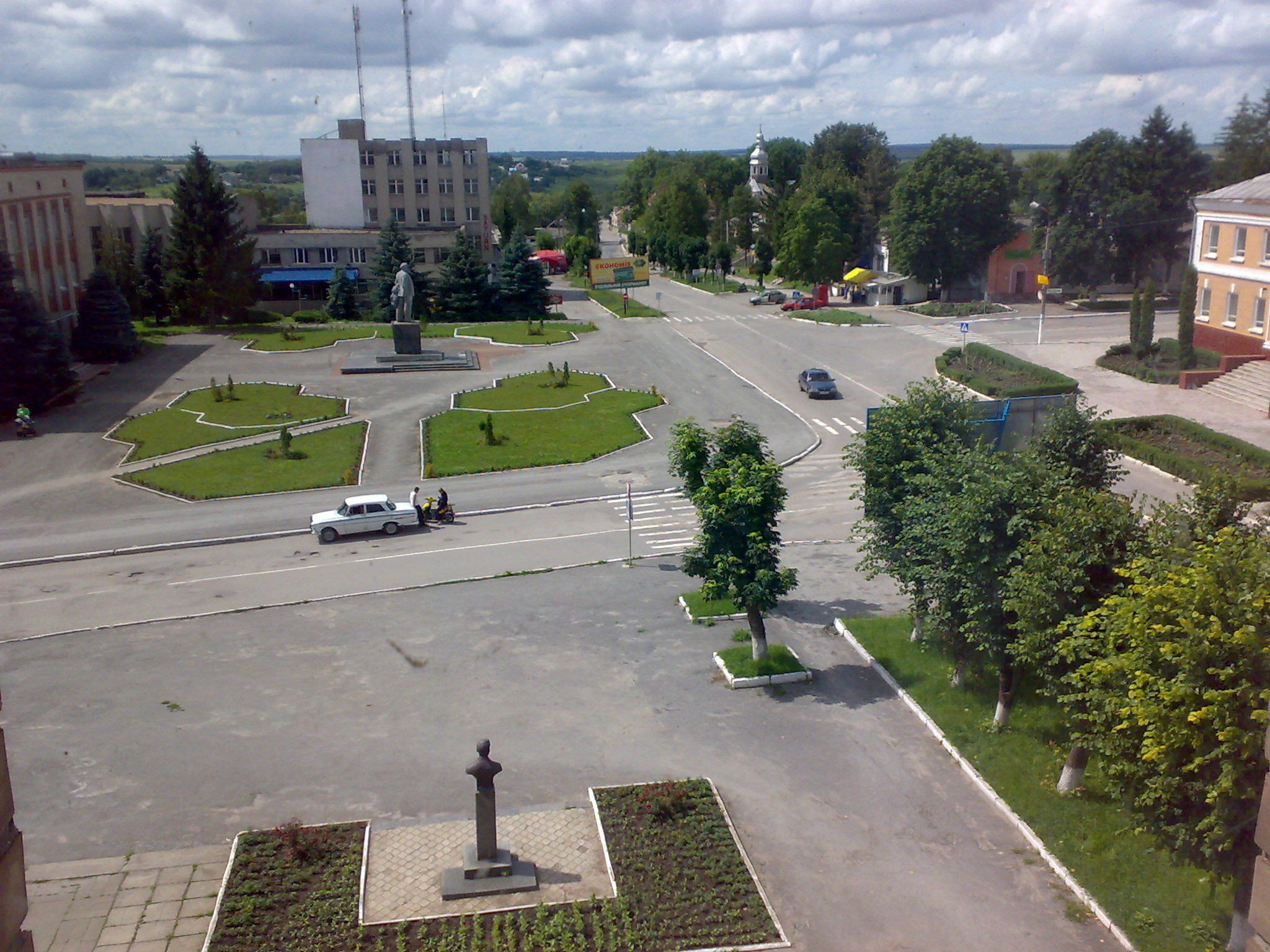
- City center

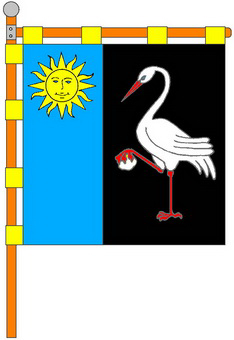
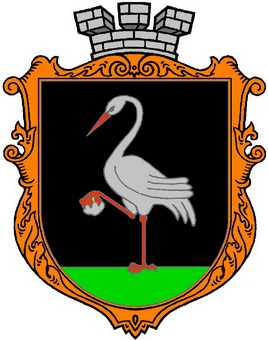
- Flag Coat of arms

- Location of Dunaivtsi in Khmelnytskyi Oblast Location of Dunaivtsi in Ukraine
- Coordinates: 48°53′22″N 26°51′25″E
- Country: Ukraine
- Oblast: Khmelnytskyi Oblast
- Raion: Kamianets-Podilskyi Raion
- Hromada: Dunaivtsi urban hromada
- First mentioned: 1403

Government
  - Mayor: Stanislav B. Nebelsky

Area
  - Total: 1.91 km^{2} (0.74 sq mi)
- Elevation: 300 m (980 ft)

Population (2022)
  - Total: 15,707
- Postal code: 32400—32408
- Area code: +380 3858
- Twin towns: Turek, Poland; Brandýs nad Labem-Stará Boleslav, Czech Republic
- Website: www.dunrada.org.ua

Dunaivtsi (Ukrainian: Дунаївці, IPA: [dʊˈnɑjiu̯ts⁽ʲ⁾i]; Yiddish: דינעוויץ, romanized: Dinovitz; Polish: Dunajowce) is a city in Kamianets-Podilskyi Raion, Khmelnytskyi Oblast, Ukraine. It is located on the river Ternavka, 22 km away from the railway station Dunaivtsi and 68 km from the Khmelnytskyi. Reinforcement plant, repair and engineering works and butter-processing plant are located in the city. The city also houses a control center of the State Space Agency of Ukraine. Dunaivtsi hosts the administration of Dunaivtsi urban hromada, one of the hromadas of Ukraine. Current population is 15,078 (2024).

== History ==
The date of the first written mention in document about Dunaivtsi is 1403. This year is assumed to be the foundation date of the settlement. At the request of heiress Elżbieta Lanckorońska, King Sigismund III Vasa granted Magdeburg city rights, established weekly markets and two annual fairs. In 1605, King Sigismund III Vasa granted the coat of arms and established two more annual fairs. It was a private town of various nobles, including the Stanisławski and Krasiński families, administratively located in the Podolian Voivodeship in the Lesser Poland Province of the Kingdom of Poland. The local Catholic parish church was built by the Koniecpolski family, and was the burial site of several members of the Krasiński family. Stanisław Potocki built a Capuchin church in 1751.

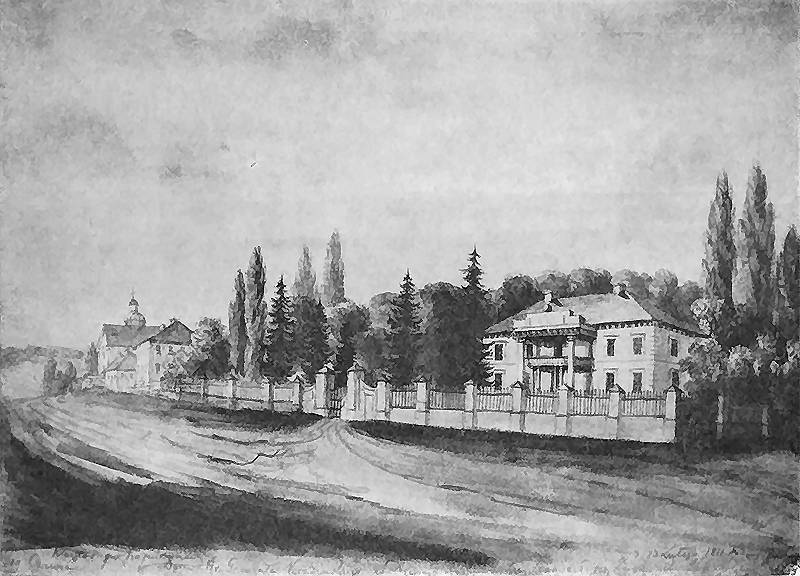
19th-century view of the Krasiński Palace with the Capuchin church and monastery in the background

After the Second Partition of Poland, in 1793–1917, it was a town in the Podolian Governorate of the Russian Empire. Industrial peak of the town was in the 1870s, when 54 factories were working and close trade relations were between Dunaivtsi and Kyiv, Warsaw, Chişinău, Kharkiv, Poltava, Kherson, Łódź, Yarmolyntsi. Between 1917 and 1920, it was at various times under Ukrainian, Polish and Soviet control.

During World War II, the town was occupied by the Germans from July 1941 until last days of March 1944. During the occupation, the Germans carried out executions of the Jews. A witness interviewed by Yahad-In Unum described one of these executions, stating, "The Germans gathered 700 Jews of Demyankovtsy. They took them into the mine where the water rose until their knees. Afterwards, the entrance was exploded and Jews were suffocated inside."

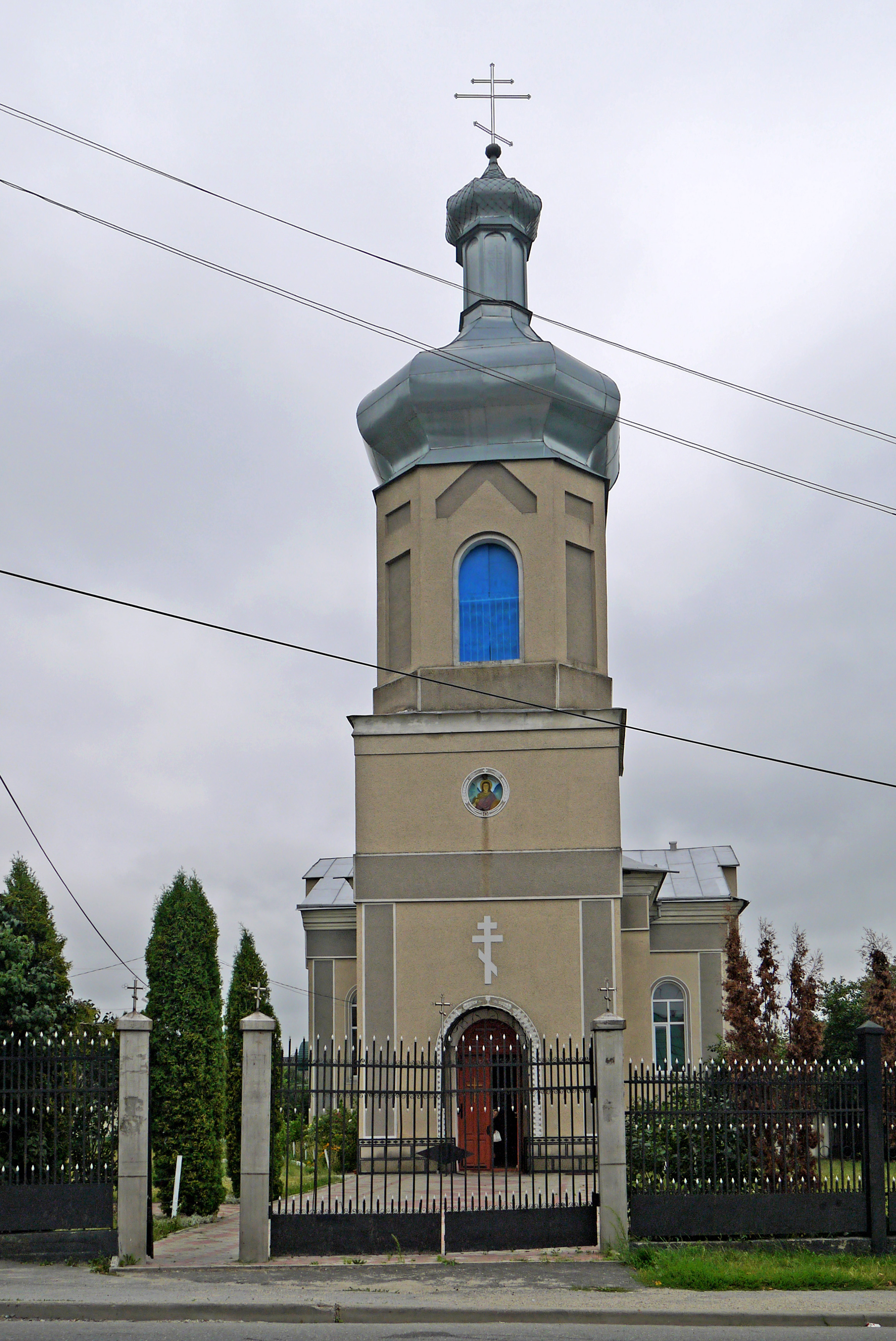
Saint Michael the Archangel Orthodox Church

Dunaivtsi has had city status in its modern form since 1958.

Until 18 July 2020, Dunaivtsi was the administrative center of Dunaivtsi Raion. The raion was abolished in July 2020 as part of the administrative reform of Ukraine, which reduced the number of raions of Khmelnytskyi Oblast to three. The area of Dunaivtsi Raion was merged into Kamianets-Podilskyi Raion.

== Geography ==
The city is located almost in the geographic center of Dunaivtsi Raion on the Ternavka (a left tributary of the Dniester), 68 km away from the center of the Khmelnytskyi Oblast — the city Khmelnytskyi.

Dunaivtsi belongs to the historical region of Podolia. Geographical coordinates of the city are 48°53'22" (latitude) and 26°51'25" (longitude).

The total area of the city is 12.84 km^{2} including 2.14 km^{2} of the built-up area and 0.483 km^{2} of the city's plantation. The total length of the streets, passages and embankments is 93.8 km.

== Population ==
630 houses and about 3 thousand inhabitants were in Dunaivtsi in 1629. According to the census of 1897, the towh had 11,000 inhabitants. According to the census of 1909 the population of Dunaivtsi was 13 733 (8 966 Jews, 2 349 Eastern Orthodoxes, 1 266 Lutheran, 1 188 Catholic, 4 members of Armenian Apostolic Church). In [1911] more than 13 thousand people lived in Dunaivtsi, where 553 houses were in this year. Due to the absence of railways in the area, by 1932 the town's population had declined to 7,000.

According to the census of 1989, Dunaivtsi's population was 17 482, and according to the census of 2001, 16 448 inhabitants were in Dunaivtsi.

According to more recent data provided by Khmelnytskyi Oblast Rada in 2006 population of Dunaivtsi city was 16 223, in 2007 – 16 187, in 2008 – 16 094, in 2009 – 16 140.

On 1 January 2010 it reached the peak of its historical population, with 20 724 inhabitants.

In January 2013 the population was 16,219 people.

=== Ethnic groups ===
When being asked about their ethnic background, over 96% of the population claimed to be ethnic Ukrainians. Small groups of ethnic minorities also live in the settlement, including ethnic Russians, Poles and Belarusians, which make up the remainder of the population. The exact ethnic composition as of the 2001 Ukrainian census was as follows:

Ethnic groups in Dunaivtsi
	percent
Ukrainians	96.57%
Russians	2.71%
Jews	0.16%
Poles	0.14%
Belarusians	0.14%
others	0.28%

== Economy ==
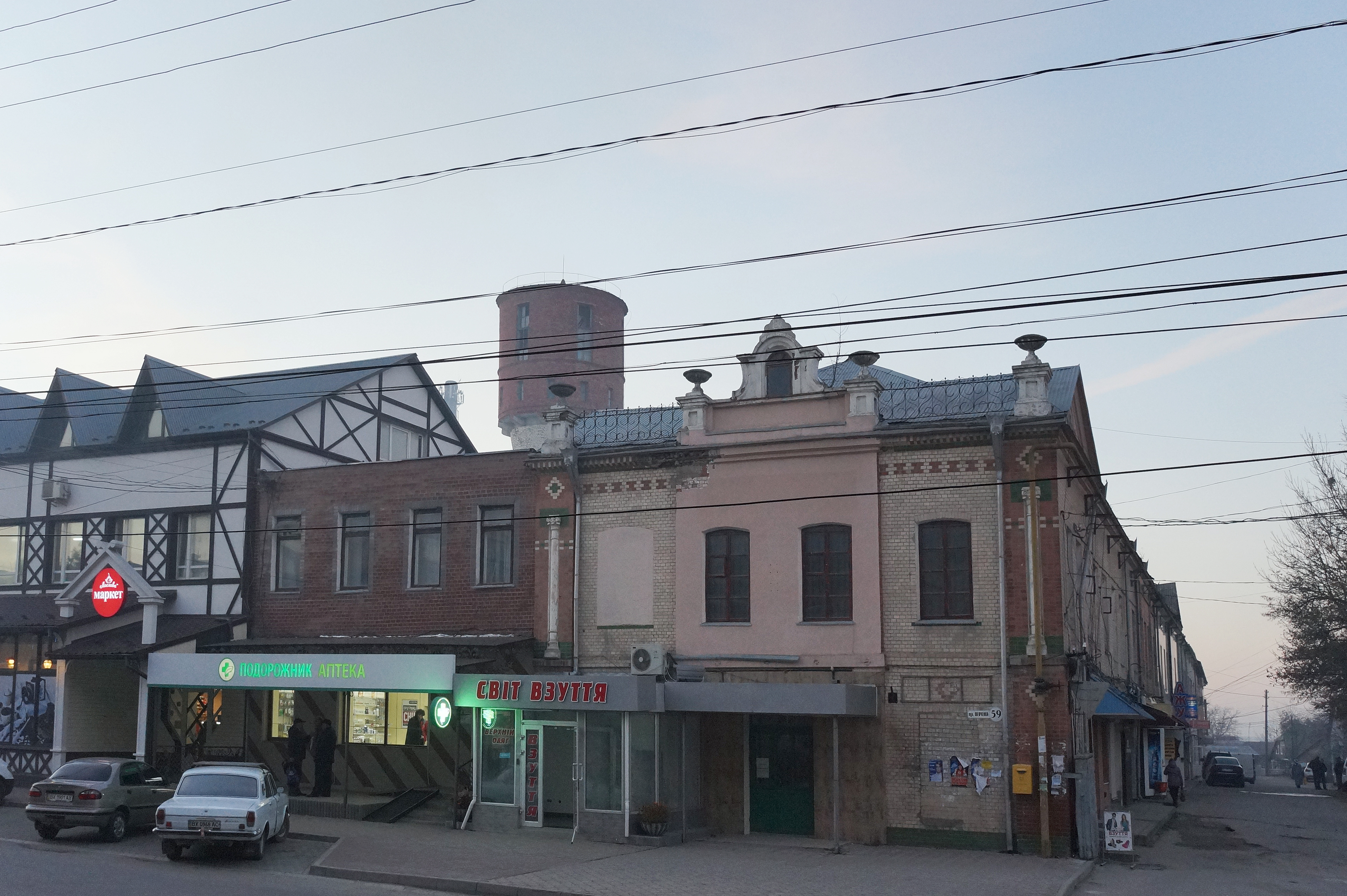
Old wool factory in Dunaivtsi

Historically, a wool factory was located in Dunaivtsi.

Supermarket "Vopak" was opened in Dunaivtsi on 20 September 2007.

== Notable people ==
See also Category:People from Dunaivtsi

- Bolesław Woytowicz, Polish pianist and composer
- Nykyfor Hryhoriv, paramilitary leader
- Frantz Lender, Soviet weapons designer
- Gennady Semigin, Russian politician
- Pavlo Hai-Nyzhnyk, historian
- Wincenty Krasiński, Political activist and military leader
- Zygmunt Krasiński, Polish Romantic poet
- Mollie Steimer, Trade Unionist, Anti-war Activist and Free-Speech Campaigner

== Twin towns ==
Dunaivtsi has two twin towns — Turek (Poland) and Brandýs nad Labem-Stará Boleslav (Czech Republic). Cooperation of Dunaivtsi with Turek was established in 2000, while with Czech city — on 10 May 2010.
