= Nyrkiv =

Rural locality in Ternopil Oblast, Ukraine

Nyrkiv Нирків
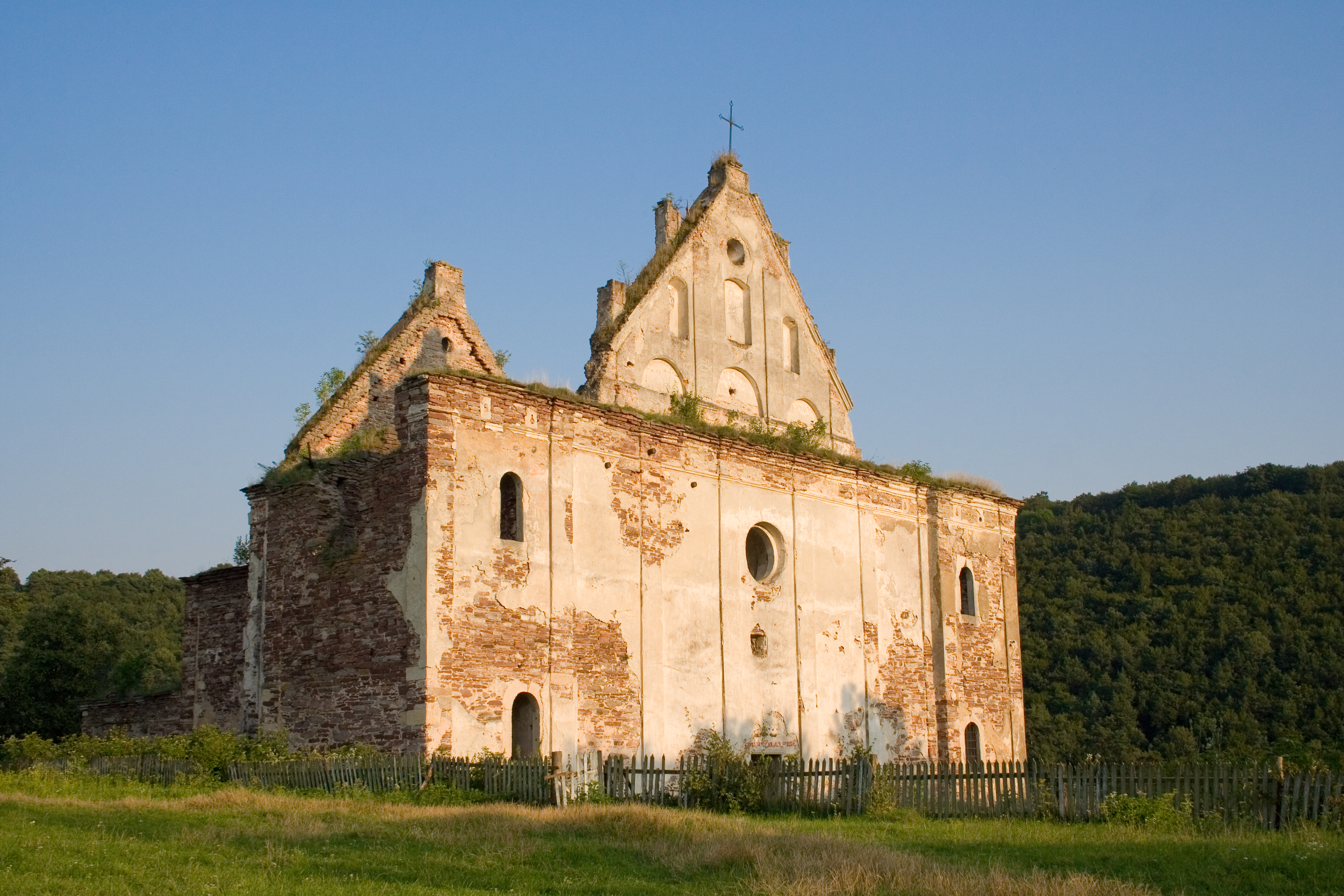
- church

- Location in Ternopil Oblast Nyrkiv (Ukraine)
- Coordinates: 48°48′43″N 25°35′59″E
- Country: Ukraine
- Oblast: Ternopil Oblast
- Raion: Chortkiv Raion
- Hromada: Tovste Hromada
- Time zone: UTC+2 (EET)
  - Summer (DST): UTC+3 (EEST)
- Postal code: 48630

Nyrkiv (Ukrainian: Нирків) is a village in Tovste settlement hromada, Chortkiv Raion, Ternopil Oblast, Ukraine. The village of Chervonohorod and the khutir of Pidchertsi belonged to the Nyrkiv rural council.

== History ==
The first written mention is from 1714.

== Religion ==
- two churches of the Intercession: the old one (1730, OCU) and the new one (1997, UGCC; two stone);
- Church of the Assumption (1615; RCC, ruin)
- chapels of the Poniński and Sts. Peter and Paul (2001).

== Monuments ==
- Chervonohorod Castle (now in a state of ruin)
- Dzhurynskyi waterfall

== Sources ==
- (in Ukrainian) Безгубенко О., Мизак Н., Олійник, В., Нирків // Ternopil Oblast. History of cities and villages: in 3 v. / Ternopil: "Terno-graph", 2014, V. 2: Г—Л, S. 193—195. — ISBN 978-966-457-228-3.
- "Czerwonogród". Geographical Dictionary of the Kingdom of Poland (in Polish). 1. Warszawa: Kasa im. Józefa Mianowskiego. 1880. p. 845.
- "Nyrków i Słone". Geographical Dictionary of the Kingdom of Poland (in Polish). 7. Warszawa: Kasa im. Józefa Mianowskiego. 1886. p. 315.
