= Podolian Voivodeship =

Voivodeship of the Kingdom of Poland

Coordinates: 48°40′23″N 26°35′10″E

Podolian Voivodeship Województwo podolskie Palatinatus Podoliae
- Voivodeship of Poland
- 1434–1793
- Coat of arms

- Podolian Voivodeship the Polish–Lithuanian Commonwealth in 1635.
- Capital: Kamieniec Podolski
- Area
- 17.770 km^{2} (6.861 sq mi)
- History
  - Established: 1434
  - Second Partition of Poland: 1793
- Political subdivisions: counties: 3
Preceded by	Succeeded by
Duchy of Podolia	Podolia Governorate

The Podolian Voivodeship (Note: Polish: Województwo podolskie, Ukrainian: Подільське воєводство) or Palatinate of Podolia (Note: Latin: Palatinatus Podoliae) was a unit of administrative division and local government in the Kingdom of Poland, from 1434 until 1793, except for the period of Ottoman occupation (1672–1699), when the region was organized as Podolia Eyalet. Together with the Bracław Voivodeship it formed the region of Podolia, which in the Kingdom of Poland was part of Lesser Poland Province. Its capital was in Kamieniec Podolski, where local sejmiks took place and where the seat of the starosta was as well.

The voivodeship was created 1434, out of former Duchy of Podolia, which had become part of the Kingdom of Poland in the second half of the 14th century. After the Second Partition of Poland, it was seized by the Russian Empire, which in 1793 created the Podolia Governorate. Today the region belongs to Ukraine.

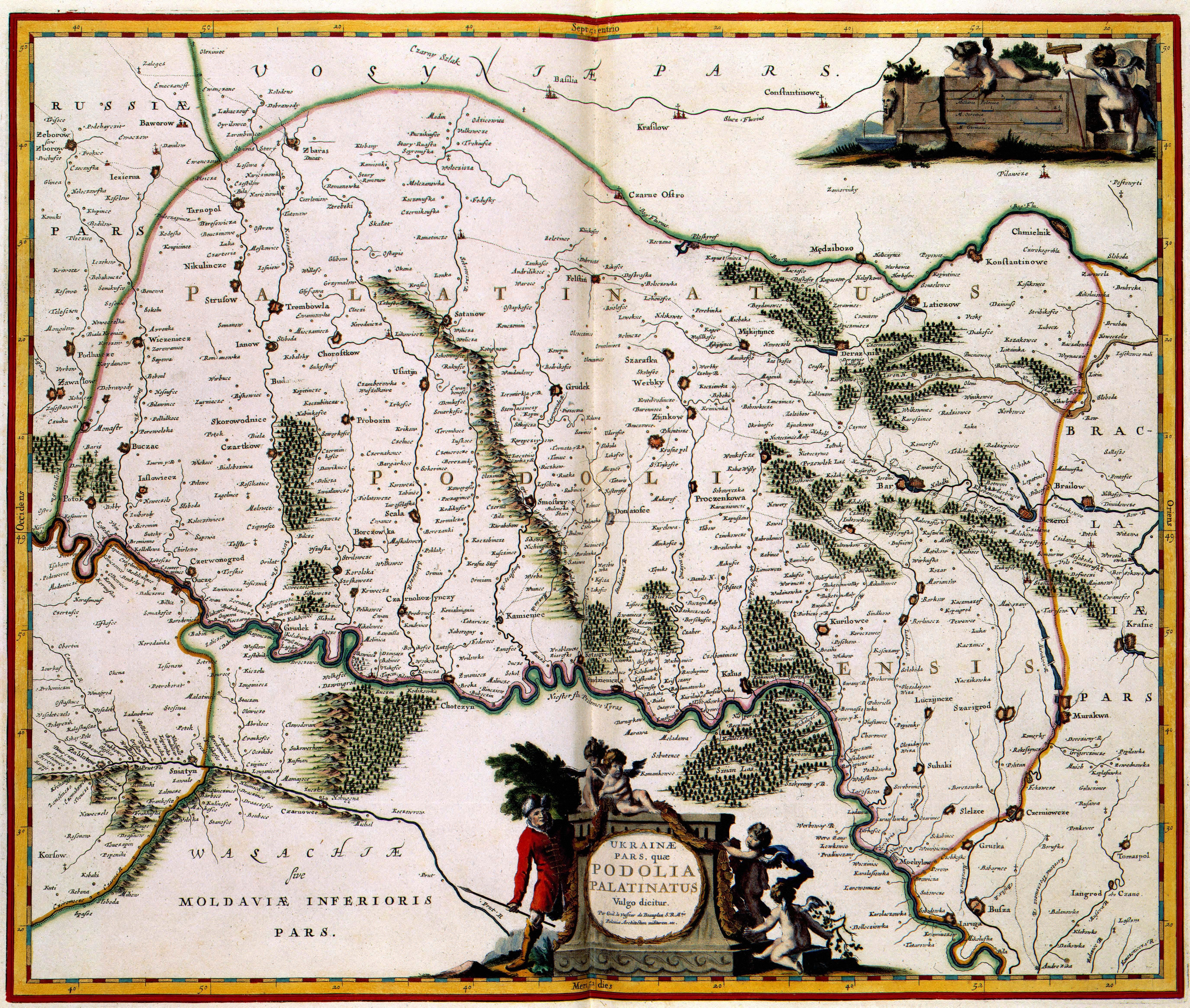
Map of the Podolian Voivodeship from 1664

Zygmunt Gloger in his monumental book Historical Geography of the Lands of Old Poland gives a detailed description of Podole Voivodeship:

In ancient times, Podole was a borderland of permanent Slavic settlements, behind which were steppes, inhabited by nomadic tribes. Proximity of these Barbaric tribes made it impossible for the Slavs to take full advantage of Podole, which is the most beautiful and the richest of all Slavic lands (...) For many years borders of Podole were not defined. The province was captured by the Tatars in the 13th century. They in return were chased away by the Lithuanians, who in the mid-14th century clashed here with Poland. Podole was in 1352 captured by Algirdas, and in 1396 King Wladyslaw Jagiello placed this land under Spytek of Melsztyn. Later on, Podole was ruled by Svitrigaila, and finally in 1434 the Sejm created Podole Voivodeship, naming Piotr Odrowaz the first voivode. Still, the Grand Duchy of Lithuania continued to claim this land, and the conflict was ended by the 1569 Union of Lublin (...) If it had not been for thousands of Polish szlachta families, who since the 14th century settled here, Podole would remain a deserted steppe (...)

Boundaries of the new voivodeship were as follows: in northwest it bordered Trembowla County of Ruthenian Voivodeship, in the north it bordered Volhynian Voivodeship, while in the east it touched Braclaw Voivodeship. Whole southern and southwestern border went along the Dniestr and the Stypa rivers (...) In its early years, Podole Voivodeship had a number of small counties, which were located around royal castles. In the 15th century, there were counties of Skala Podolska, Smotrycz, Bakota, Latyczow, Miedzyboz, Chmielnik, Zinkow, and Bar. Finally, in 1542 only three counties were established, at Czerwonogrod, Kamieniec and Latyczow (...)

In the 16th century, Podole Voivodeship had 37 towns, and according to the 1578 census, there were 650 villages. By 1583, the number of villages was reduced to only 434, due to constant Crimean Tatar raids. The voivodeship also had 35 castles and forts (...)

Podole Voivodeship had three senators: the Bishop, the Voivode and the Castellan of Kamieniec. Local starosta, who also used the title "General of Podolian Lands", governed two towns, those of Kamieniec and Latyczow. There also were starostas at Czerwonogrod, Bar, Chmielnik, Kopajgrod, Mukarow, Ploskirow and others. Sejmiks took place at Kamieniec, where six deputies to the Sejm were elected, as well as two deputies to the Lesser Poland Tribunal at Lublin (...) Podole Voivodeship had two border judges, who cooperated with officials of the Ottoman Porte, solving border conflicts.

== Municipal government ==
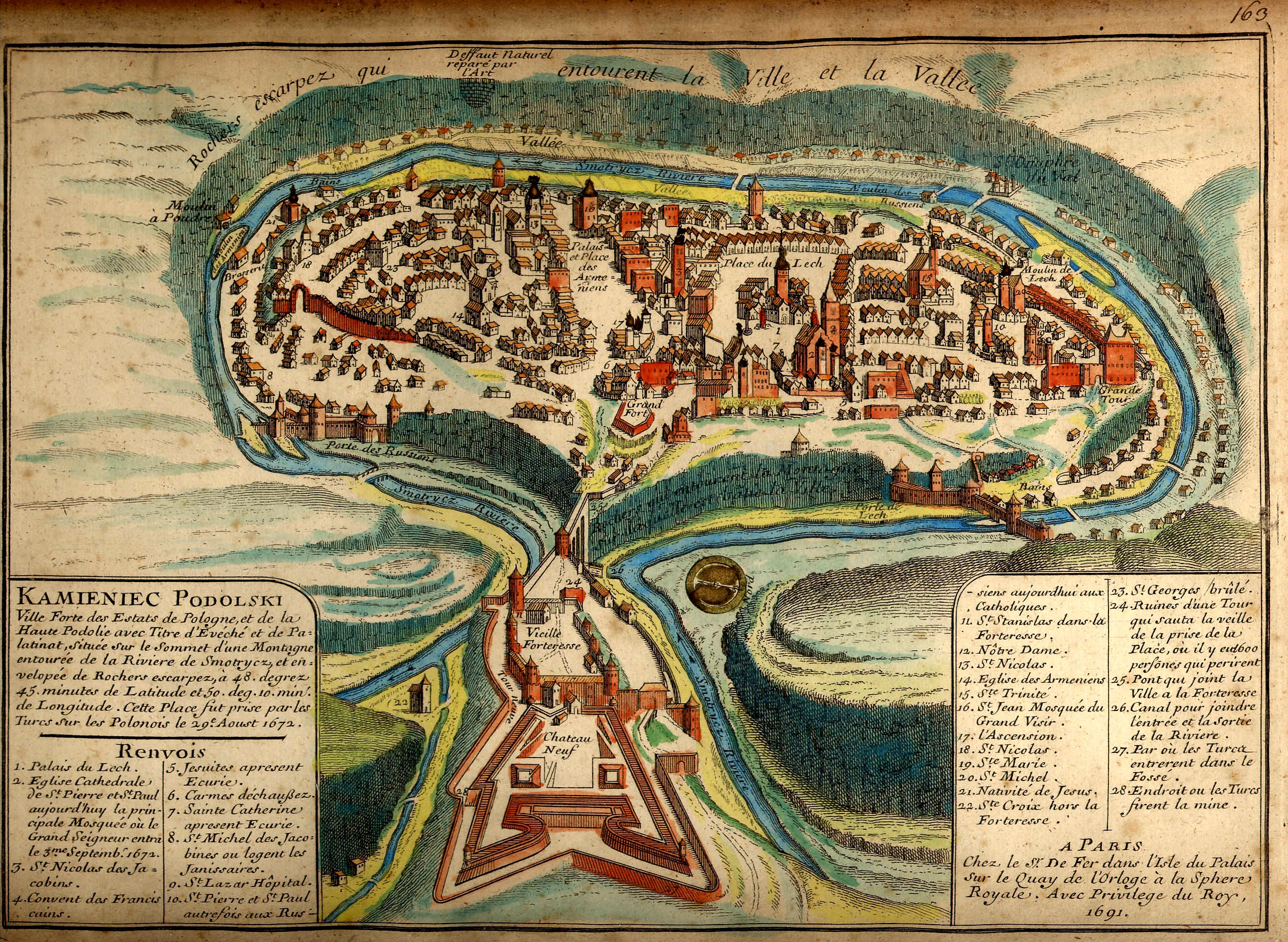
Kamieniec Podolski, capital of the voivodeship, in the 17th century

Voivodeship Governor (voivode) seat:

- Kamieniec Podolski

General council (sejmik generalny) for all Ruthenian lands

- Sądowa Wisznia

Regional council (sejmik poselski i deputacki) seats:

- Kamieniec Podolski

== Administrative division ==
- Kamieniec County (Powiat Kamieniecki), Kamieniec Podolski
- Czerwonograd County (Powiat Czerwonogradzki), Czerwonogród
- Latyczów County (Powiat Sanocki), Latyczów

== Voivodes ==
- Michał Buczacki (House of Buczacki)
- Michał Mużyło Buczacki
- Stanisław Odrowąż (since 1535)
- Mikołaj Mielecki (since 1569)
- Tomasz Zamoyski (since 1618)
- Marcin Krasicki (1630–1632/1633)
- Marcin Kazanowski (1632/1633–1636)
- Stanisław "Rewera" Potocki (1636–1653)
- Seweryn Rzewuski

== Neighbouring Voivodeships and regions ==
- Ruthenian Voivodeship
- Volhynian Voivodeship
- Kiev Voivodeship
- Bracław Voivodeship
- Moldavia

== Sources ==
- Podole Voivodeship, description by Zygmunt Gloger
- Central European Superpower, Henryk Litwin, BUM Magazine, October 2016.
