= Makovytsia =

Mountain in Ukraine; part of the Vihorlat-Gutin Area

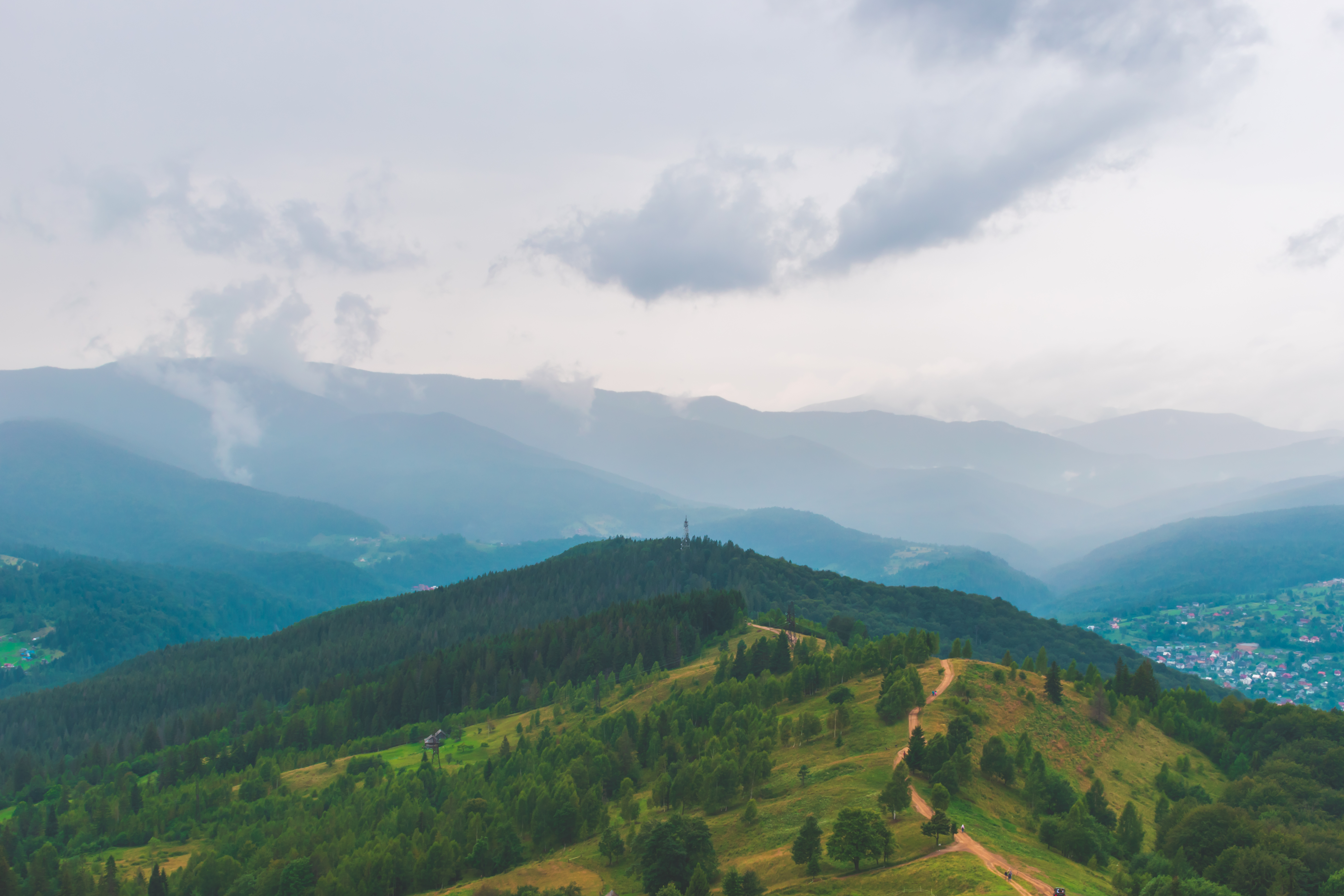

Highest point
- Elevation: 984 m (3,228 ft)
- Coordinates: 48°27′04″N 24°35′27″E

Naming
- Native name: Маковиця (Ukrainian); Makowica (Polish)

Geography
- Location within Ivano-Frankivsk Oblast Location within Ukraine
- Location: Ivano-Frankivsk Oblast, Ukraine
- Parent range: Gorgany

Makovytsia (Ukrainian: Маковиця; Polish: Makowica) is a mountain within the Gorgany mountain range, in Ukraine's Ivano-Frankivsk Oblast. It has a height of 984 m (3,228 ft), and is located near the city of Yaremche.

Makovytsia is part of the Carpathian National Nature Park. A campsite is located on the mountain, but it does not have hot water. There are two trails on the mountain; the first is a 9 km (5.6 mi) hiking trail on the mountain, known as "Dovbush's Trail" after folk hero Oleksa Dovbush, while the second is a shorter trail, starting as part of Yaremche's Ivan Franko Street and passing by a local chapel and homes.

According to local legend, Makovytsia was the site of a pre-Christian temple where sacrifices were conducted. A wooden cross, as well as a statue of the Mary, mother of Jesus and two angels, has been erected on the mountain with the intention of warding off evil spirits.
