= Anna Kisil =

British social activist

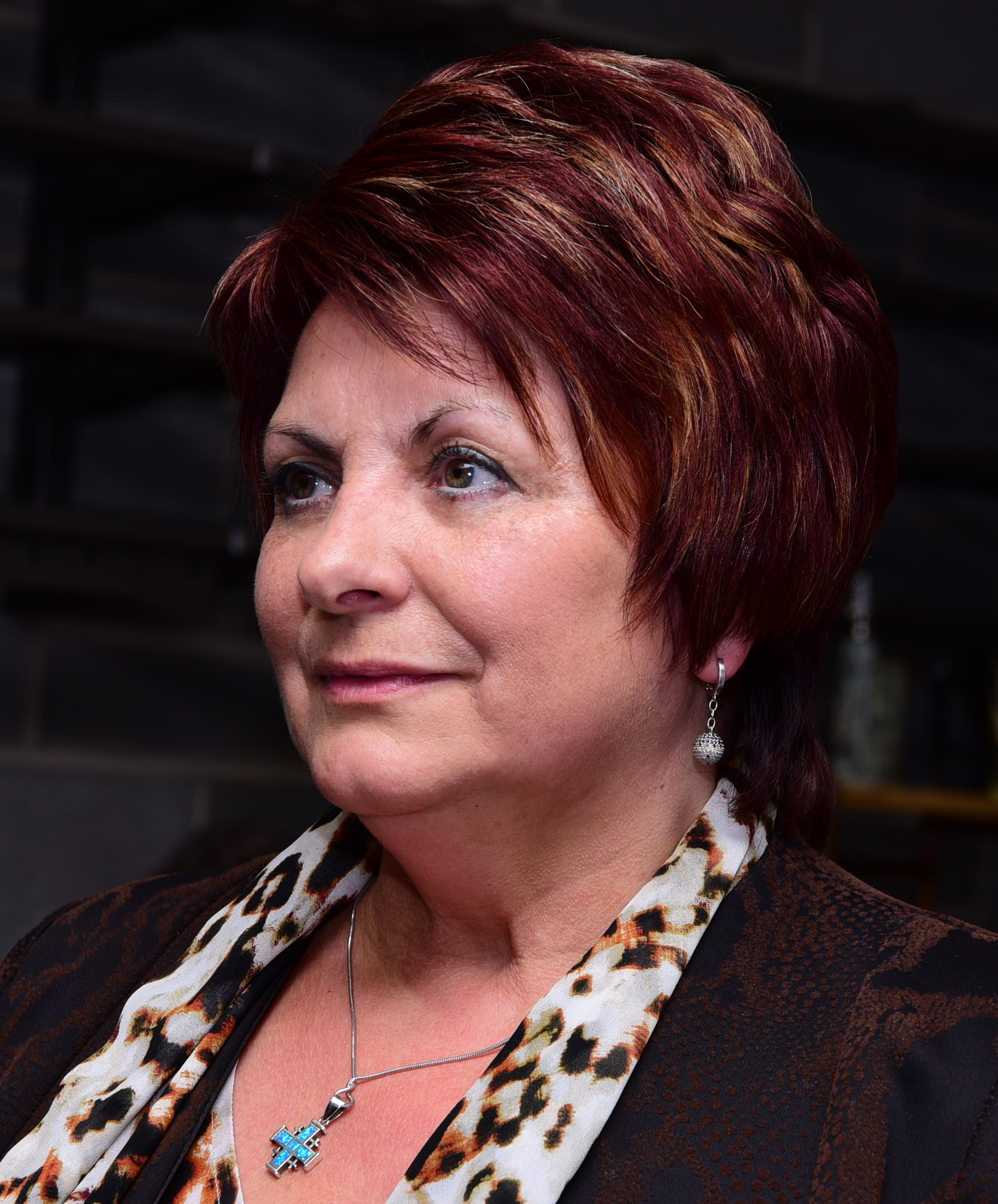
- Anna Kisil in 2018
- Born: November 19, 1960 in Yaremche, Ukraine
- Died: November 16, 2020 (aged 59) in Toronto, Canada
- Occupations: philanthropist, restaurateur, social activist

Anna Kisil was a philanthropist, social activist and volunteer. She was one of the founding members of the multinational non-profit organization "Fourth Wave" in the International Organization of Ukrainian Communities in North America.

== Childhood and education ==
Anna Kisil was born November 19, 1960 in Yaremche, a city in Eastern Galicia in Ukraine. She graduated from Lviv Polytechnic Institute with a degree in civil engineering.

== Adulthood ==
She lived in Lviv, 500 kilometres southwest of Chernobyl, during the Chernobyl disaster. During this time she was living with her husband, five-year-old son, and pregnant with her daughter. Which resulted in her family's relocation and moving in with Anna's mom in the Carpathian Mountains, staying there for months. Then a few years later in 1990, her family emigrated to Oshawa, Canada

== Achievements ==
Anna Kisil became a motivated entrepreneur opening and maintaining multiple companies and restaurants such as Meest media, Golden Lion and Roslan-Pak. Anna was a philanthropic worker who participated in several projects in Ukraine building churches and aiding in the work and reconstruction of different historical sites. Her business ventures and philanthropic work earned her the Ordinance of Merit, Ukraine's highest honour. Was the Chair of the World Council of Culture from 2008 to 2018 then was the Ukrainian World Congress (UWC) Vice President and Chair of the World Federation of Ukrainian Women's Organizations both since 2018. She has been awarded President of Ukraine's Medal on the occasion of 25 Years of Ukraine's Independence, the Ivan Mazepa Cross, and the UWC's highest award, the St. Vladimir the Great Medal
