= History of technology in Ukraine =

The development of technology in Ukraine in the modern sense (associated with the advent of machines and the mechanization of production processes) began at the end of the 18th century. It started from the machinery in textile industry (including the equipment of rope and spinning production). Later the technology of steel making, crystal, glass, porcelain and faience production began to develop, especially in Volyn. In the 19th century the discovery of deposits of iron ore and coal, and the construction of railways started off the period of industrial capitalism. Mechanization and machinery began to play an increasingly important role. The establishment of a large number of machine-building enterprises began.

In the Russian Empire, machine building was poorly developed and almost all complex machines were imported from abroad. The same situation was in Ukraine, foreigners built complex machinery here. Kandyba, Ya. Kozlovsky, I. Vasil'kov belong to pioneers of technology in 19th century. One of the areas of technology that reached a high level of development in Ukraine was the technique of road and bridge building (among others: the chain bridge over the Dnieper, built in 1847-1853 by the project of E. Vignel, the high bow gauge bridge and the tunnel near Yaremcha in the Carpathians, built 1898-1902 by Project Bizantz, Matakiewicz, etc.). Railways, the regulation of rivers flow, the construction of power stations in Kiev 1890 and in Kharkov 1897, urban transport technique (tram), the use of natural gas in municipal household, technology of extraction and refining of oil. Professits and engineers, graduates from Lviv Polytechnics (founded in 1845), later Kharkiv (from 1883) and Kiev Polytechnic Institutes (since 1898)did here the best work.

== The main achievements of modern technology in Ukraine ==
- 1927 — construction of Dnipropestan.
- 1932 — the first atom split in the USSR took place at the Kharkov Physico-Chemical-Mathematical Institute.
- 1934 — the first heavy water obtained in the USSR.
- 1937 —commissioning of the first USSR electrostatic generator with 2,5 Megawatt output.
- 1950–1955 — the creation of the first USSR linear accelerator of charged parts for 20 MeV and electron accelerator at 30 MeV.
- 1962–1965 — production of the first computers in the USSR and their further improvement. Creation of new generations of turbo-propeller aircraft (An-22 Antey, An-36), and development of high-speed jet aircraft production.
- 1967 — commissioning of 800,000 kW power units in Ukraine's power plants (the first unit at the Slavyanskaya TPP).
- Second half of the 1960s–1970s — study of the principles of controlled nuclear fusion as a source of energy in the future.
- 1974 — research method of prom. production in space. Launch of the first carrier in the USSR ("Kyiv").
- 1975–1976 — construction of blast furnaces up to 5000 m3 (Kryviy Rih).
- A striking example of effective innovations introduced into production are the radiotechnical tools for the strategic intelligence of new generation - Kolchuga, presented by the Donetsk National Technical University (2004). Thanks to its functional capabilities, the Kolchuga complex surpasses other technology of this type existing around the world.

The technology of industrial production of power high-voltage cable-conductor products which is developed by the scientists of the Institute of Electrodynamics of the National Academy of Sciences of Ukraine and cooperators of the "Plant" Pivdenkabel". This technology allows to increase by 1,5 times the resistance to emergency electrical overloads in compare with its imported analogues. Scientists of the Scientific-technological complex "Institute of Single Crystals" of the National Academy of Sciences of Ukraine founded the only one in Ukraine high-tech certified production of semiconductor crystalline metals, functionality of which allow the state to receive over 2 mln annually from the sale of science-intensive products on the world market.

Also worth mentioning is the development of the real business card of modern Ukraine, namely: the three-stage launch vehicle Zenit-3SL, operating under following programs: "Sea Launch", CB "Pivdenne", and "Southern Machine-Building Plant" (Dnipropetrovsk). Other innovations are: new generation steam turbines with a capacity of 325 MW and Turboatom (Kharkiv); battle tank "Oplot" KB im. O. Morozov and VO "Plant them. Malyshev" (Kharkiv), bonus 2009.
