= Probiy =

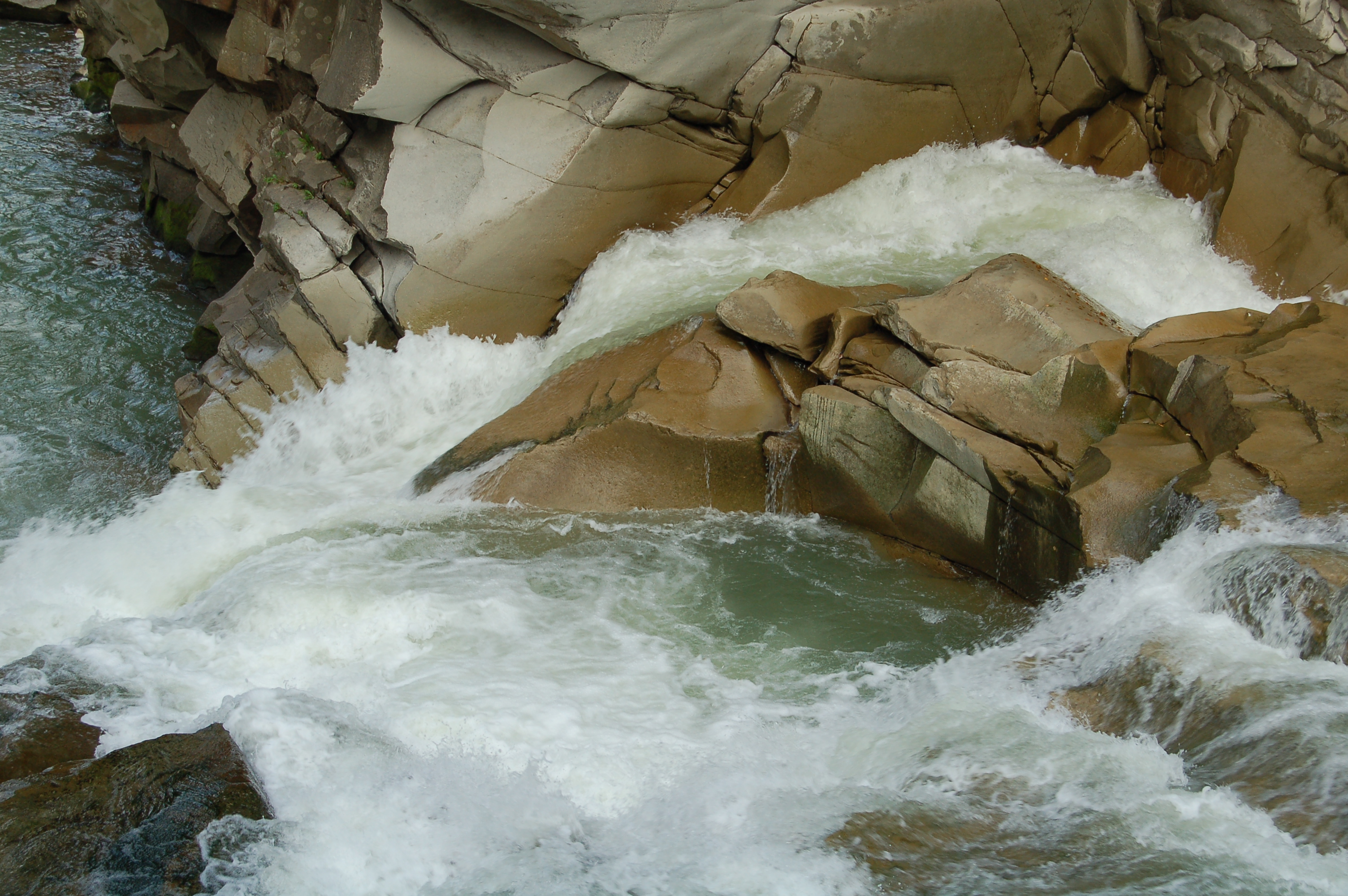

- Location within Ivano-Frankivsk Oblast Location within Ukraine
- Location: Yaremche, Ivano-Frankivsk Oblast, Ukraine
- Coordinates: 48°26′22″N 24°32′23″E
- Total height: 8 metres (26 ft)
- Watercourse: Prut river

Probiy (Ukrainian: Пробій; also called, Yaremche) is a waterfall on the Prut River, in Yaremche City, Ivano-Frankivsk Oblast, Ukraine. Probiy is 8 metres (26 ft) high and is one of the most powerful waterfalls in the Ukrainian Carpathians.

== History ==
The waterfall was significantly higher during the 19th century. The waterfall lost its height as the channel leading up to it deepened. There have been fatalities from people falling into the water onto rocks near the waterfall. The Probiy waterfall is a popular local place for kayakers and rafters.

== Gallery ==
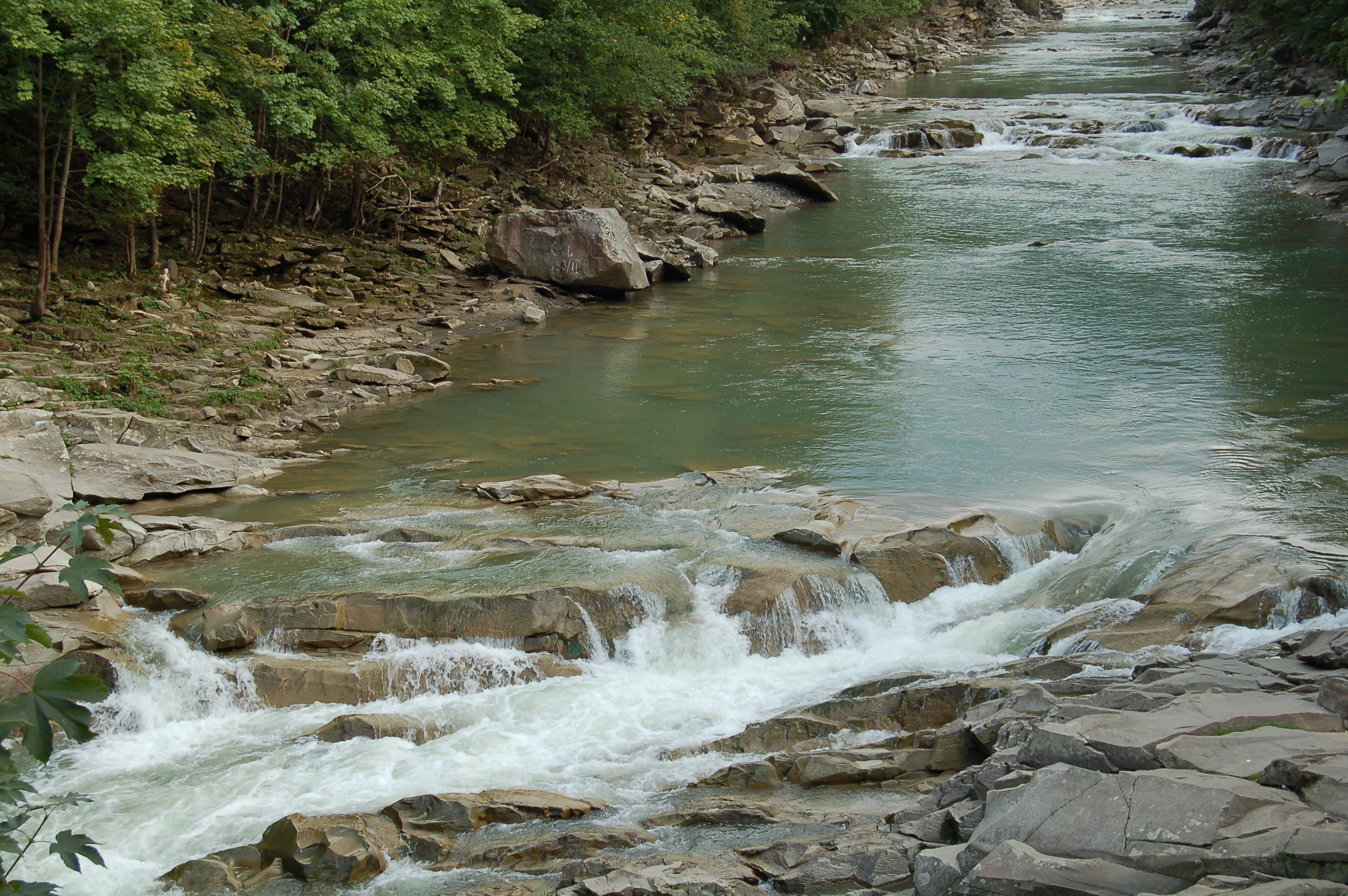

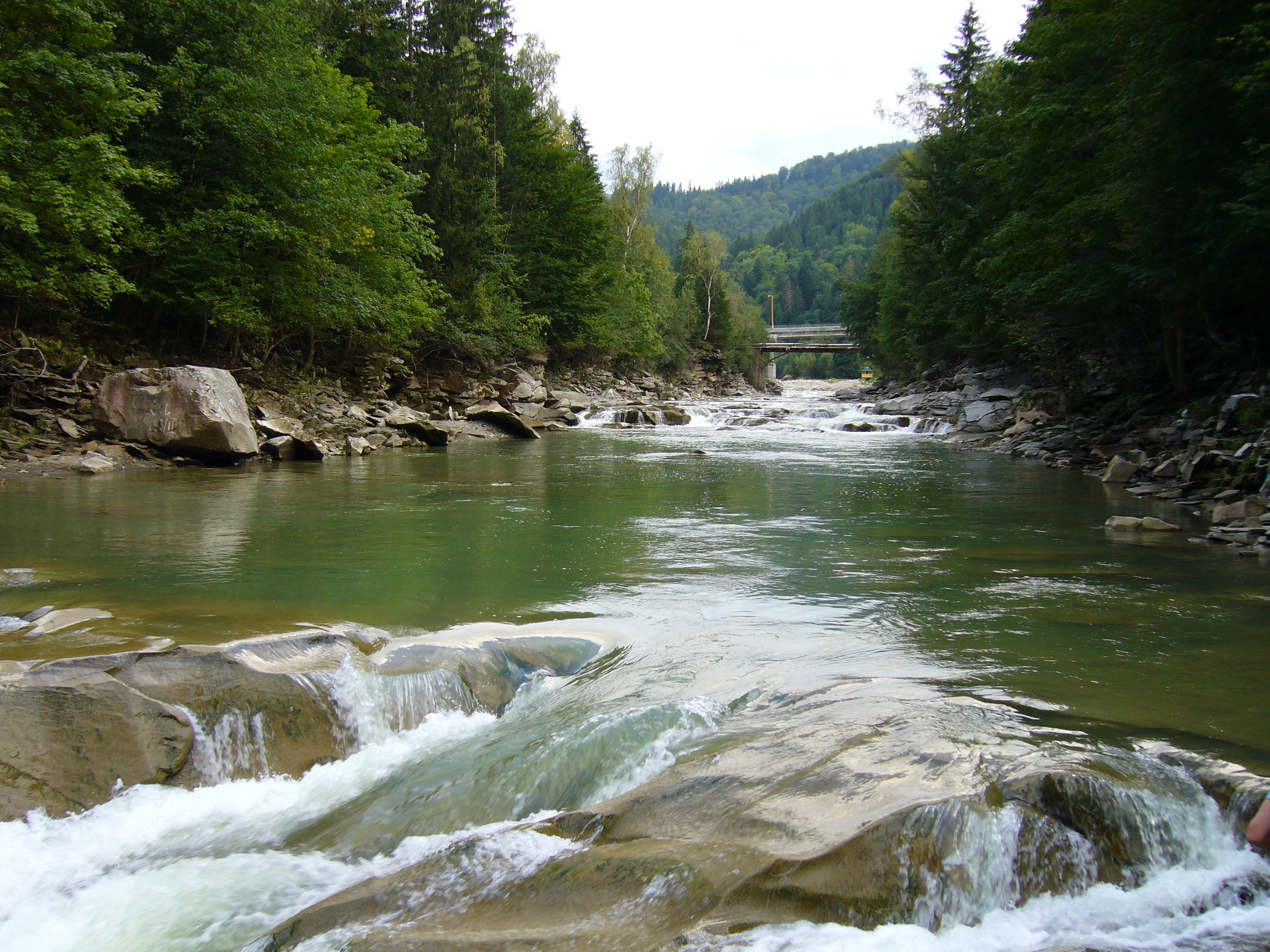

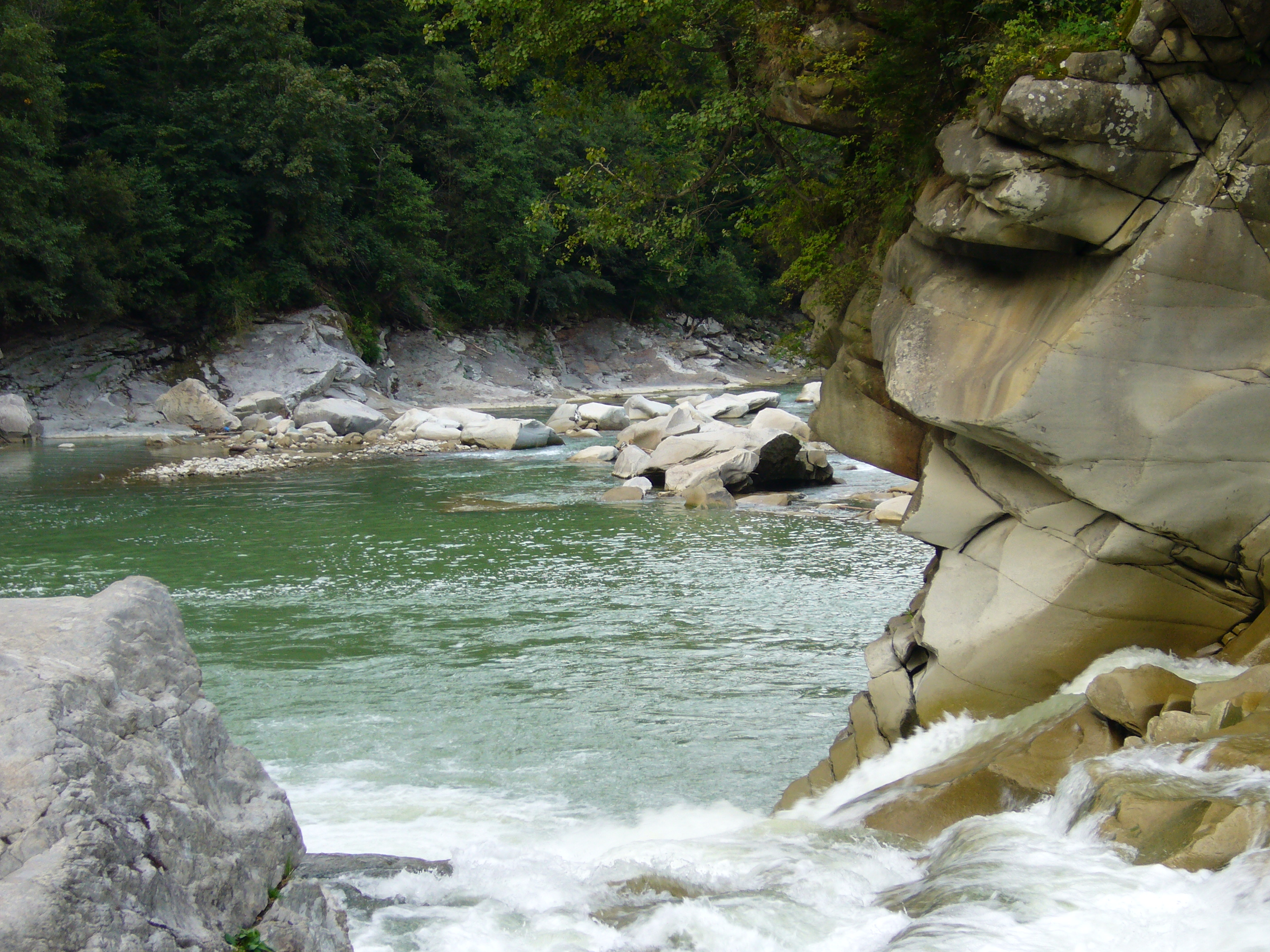

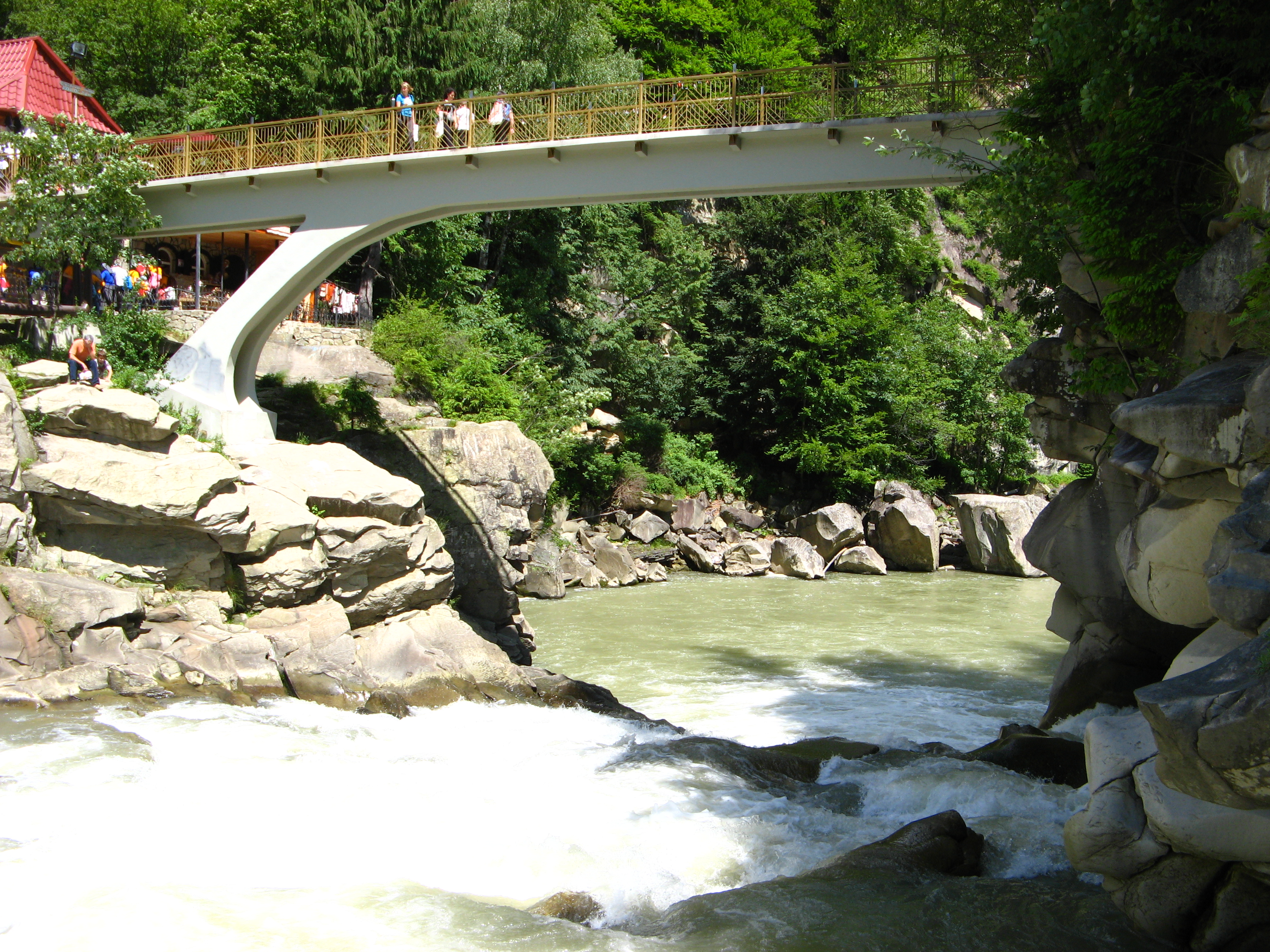

== See also ==
- Waterfalls of Ukraine
