= Mykulychyn =

Village in Ivano-Frankivsk Oblast, Ukraine

Mykulychyn Микуличин
- Village
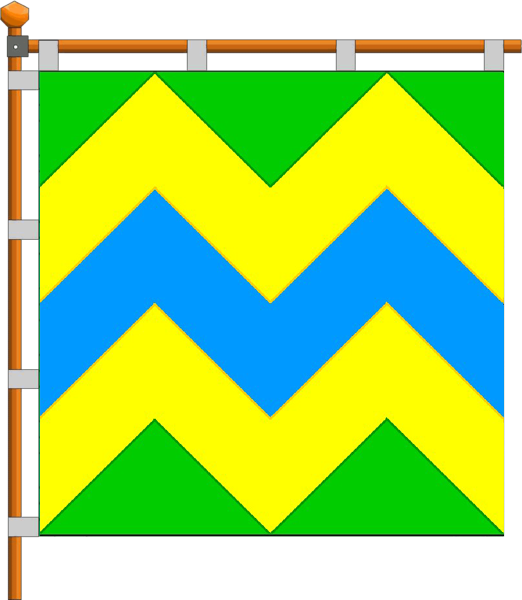
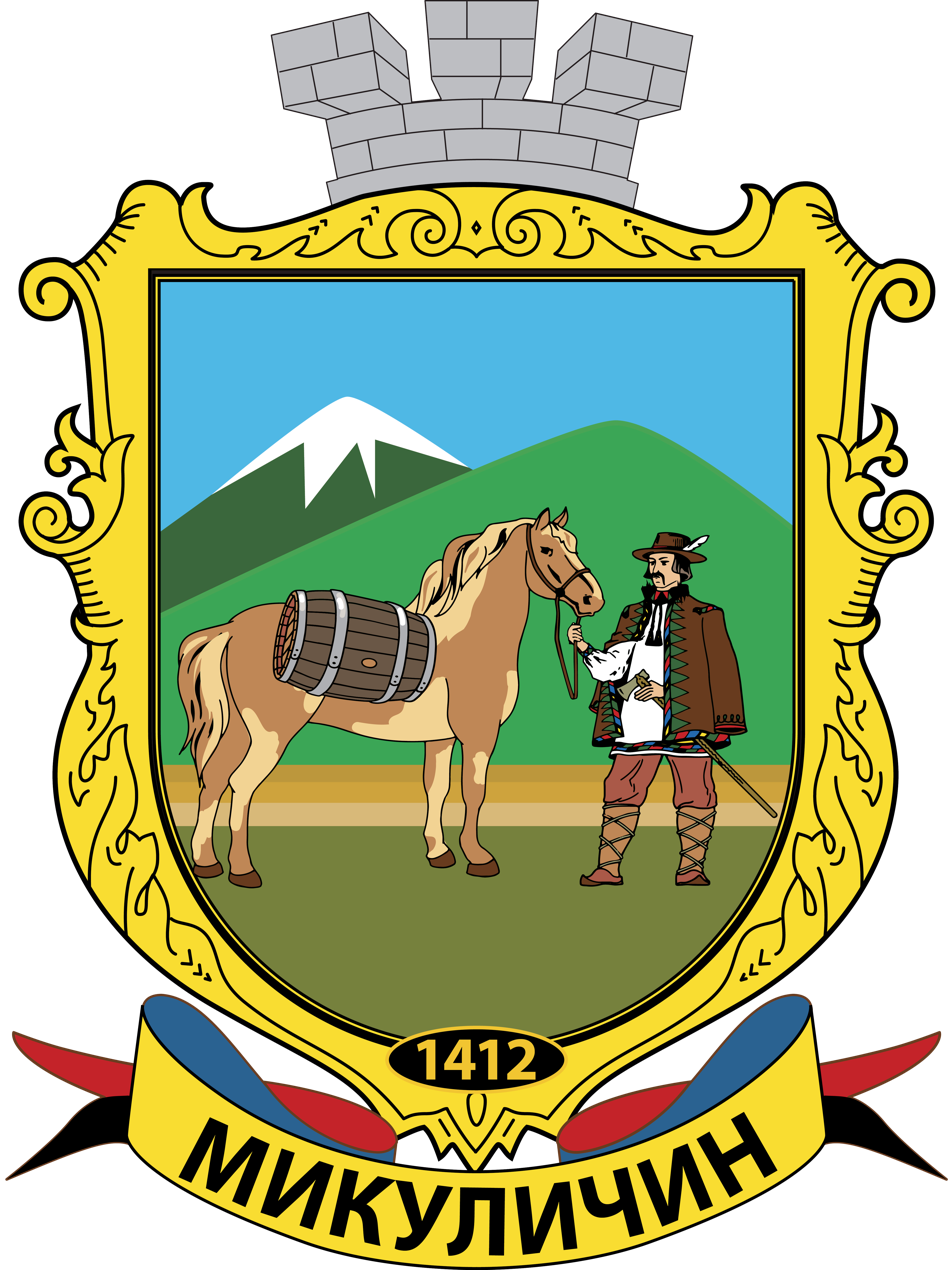
- Flag Coat of arms

- Location in Ivano-Frankivsk Oblast
- Coordinates: 48°23′35″N 24°36′7″E
- Country: Ukraine
- Oblast: Ivano-Frankivsk Oblast
- Raion: Nadvirna Raion
- Hromada: Yaremche urban hromada
- Time zone: UTC+2 (EET)
  - Summer (DST): UTC+3 (EEST)
- Postal code: 78590

Mykulychyn (Ukrainian: Микуличин) is a village in the Yaremche urban hromada of the Nadvirna Raion of Ivano-Frankivsk Oblast in Ukraine.

== History ==
The first written mention of the village was in 1412.

On July 19, 2020, as a result of the administrative-territorial reform, the village became part of Nadvirna Raion.

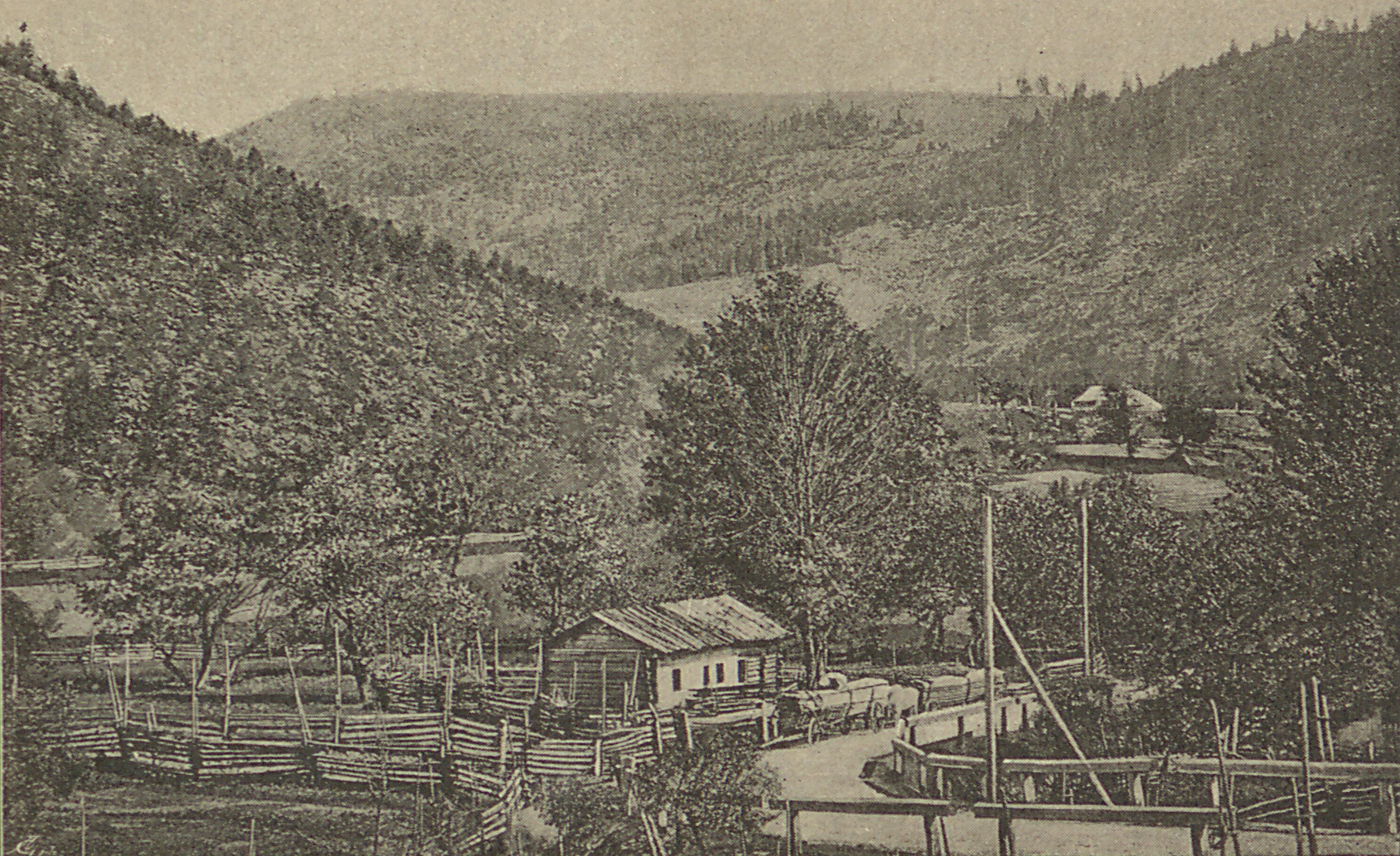
Entrance to the village, before 1892

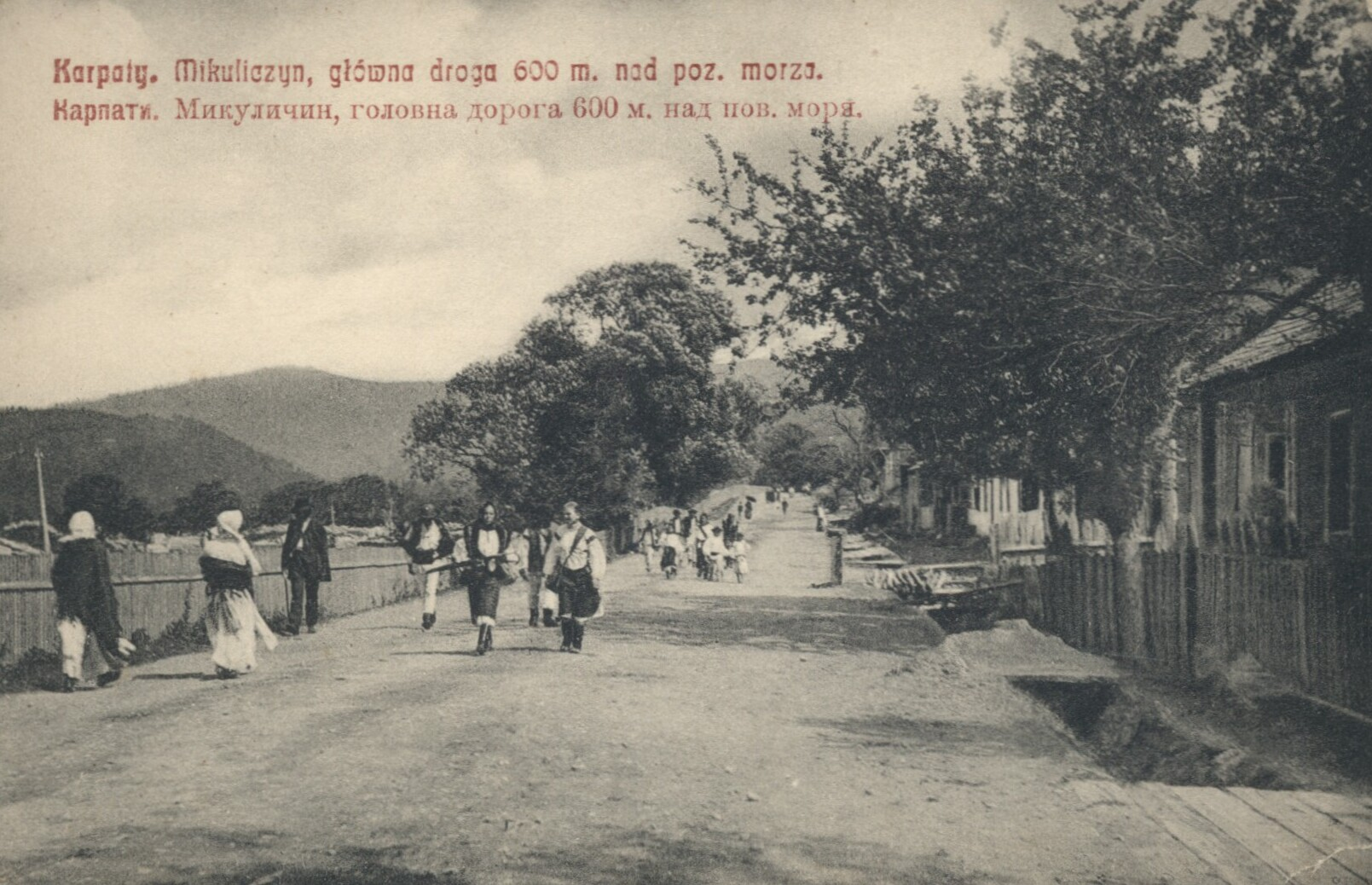
Entrance to the town, before 1892

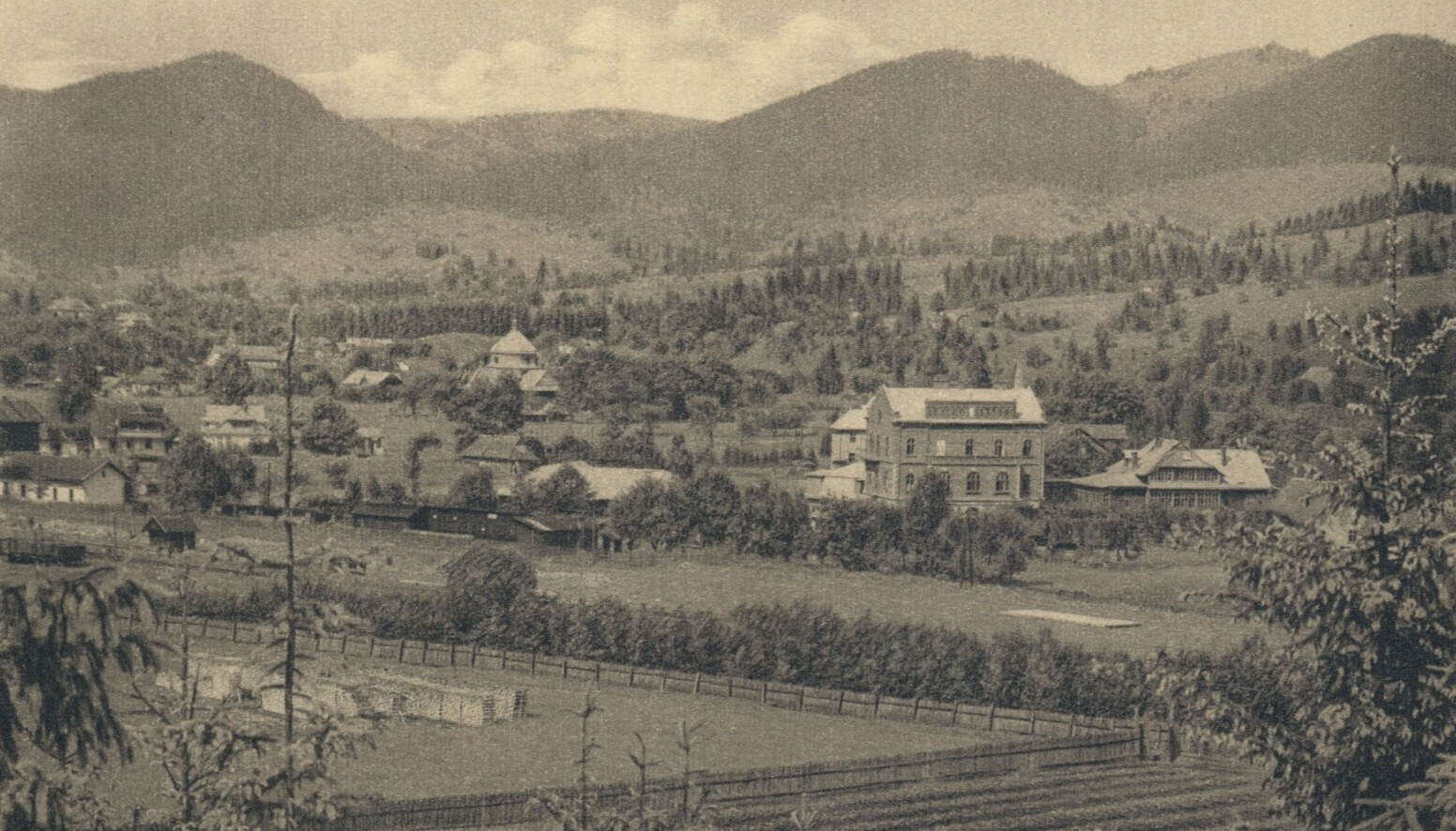
Main road

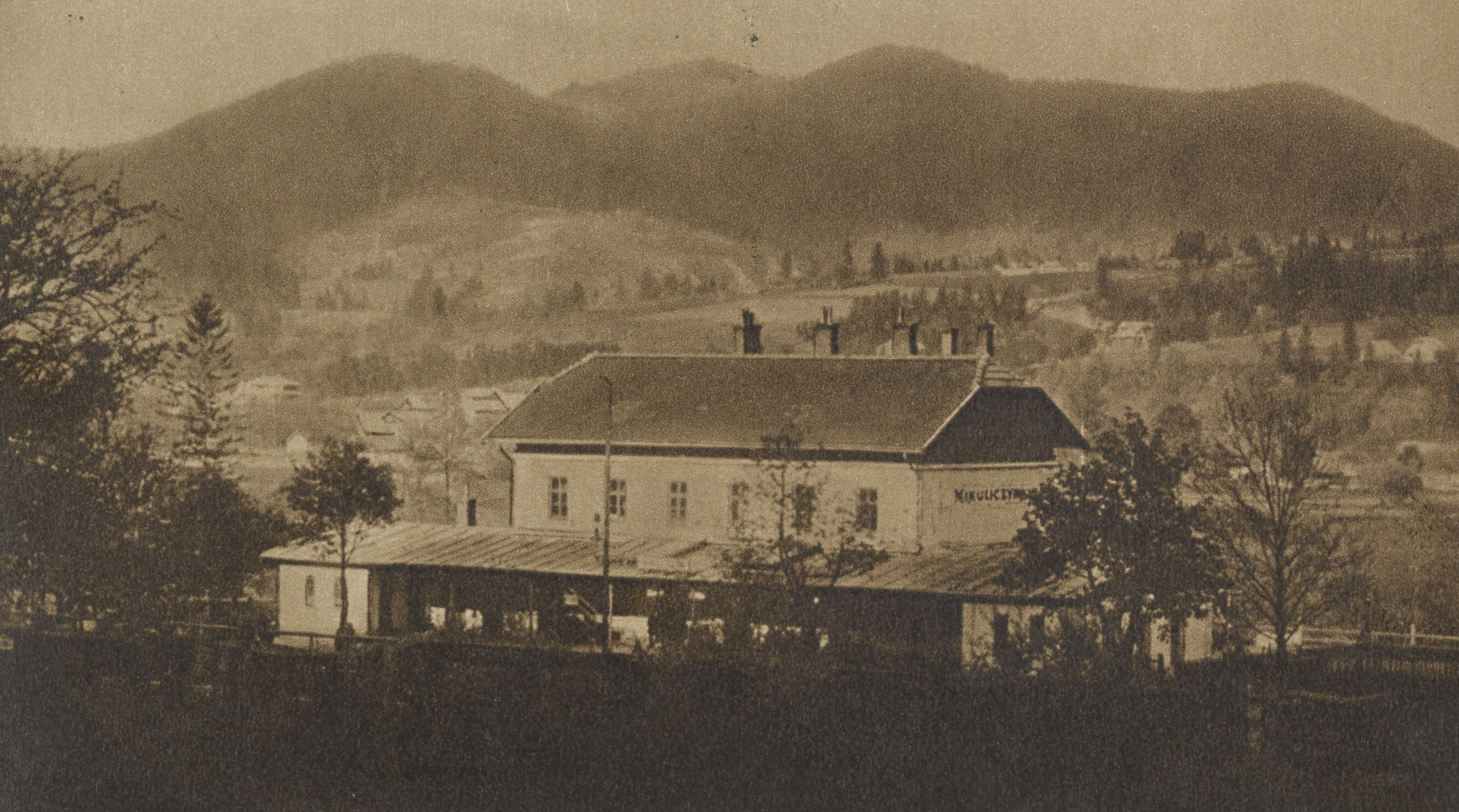
General view, before 1939

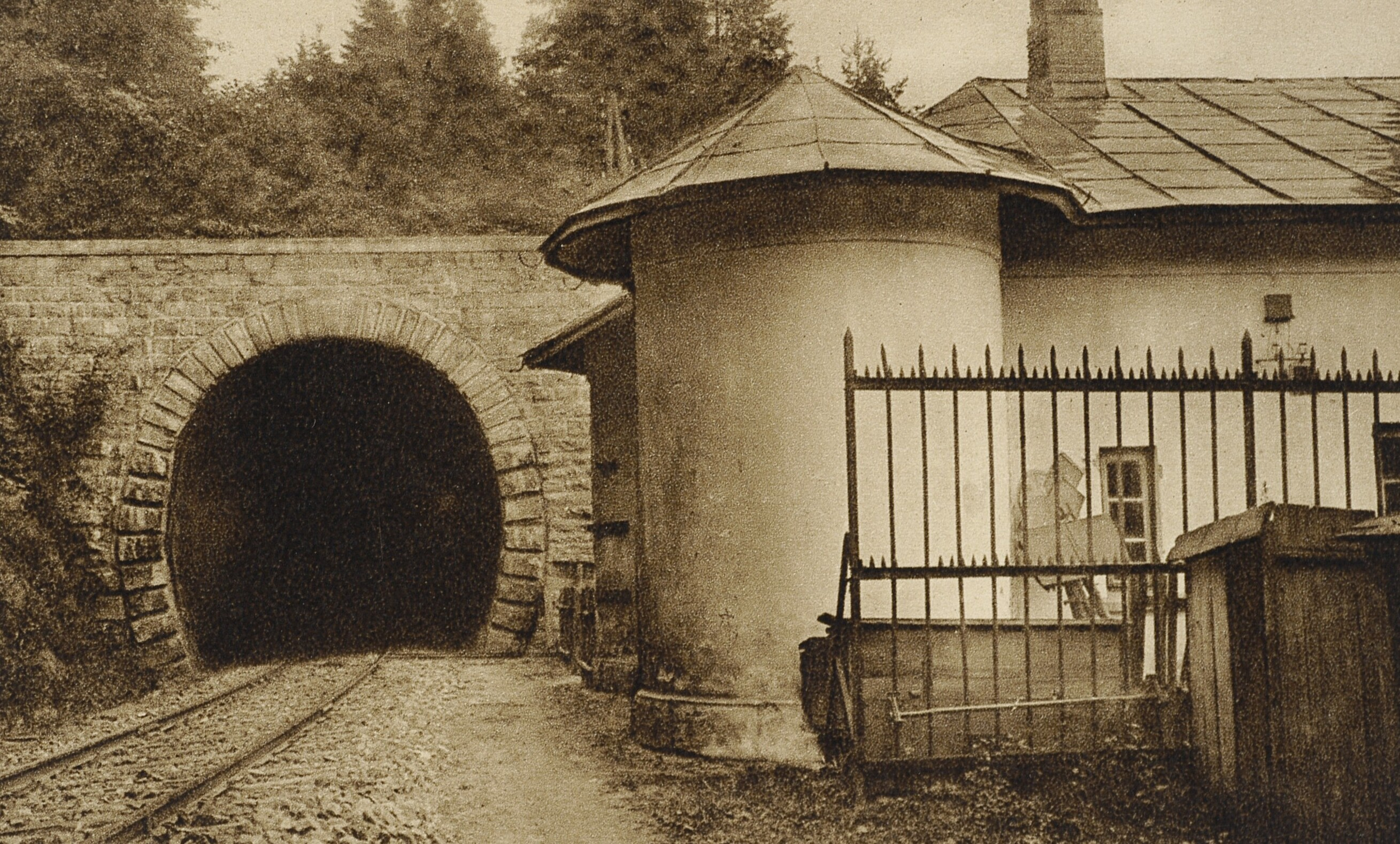
Railway tunnel, before 1930

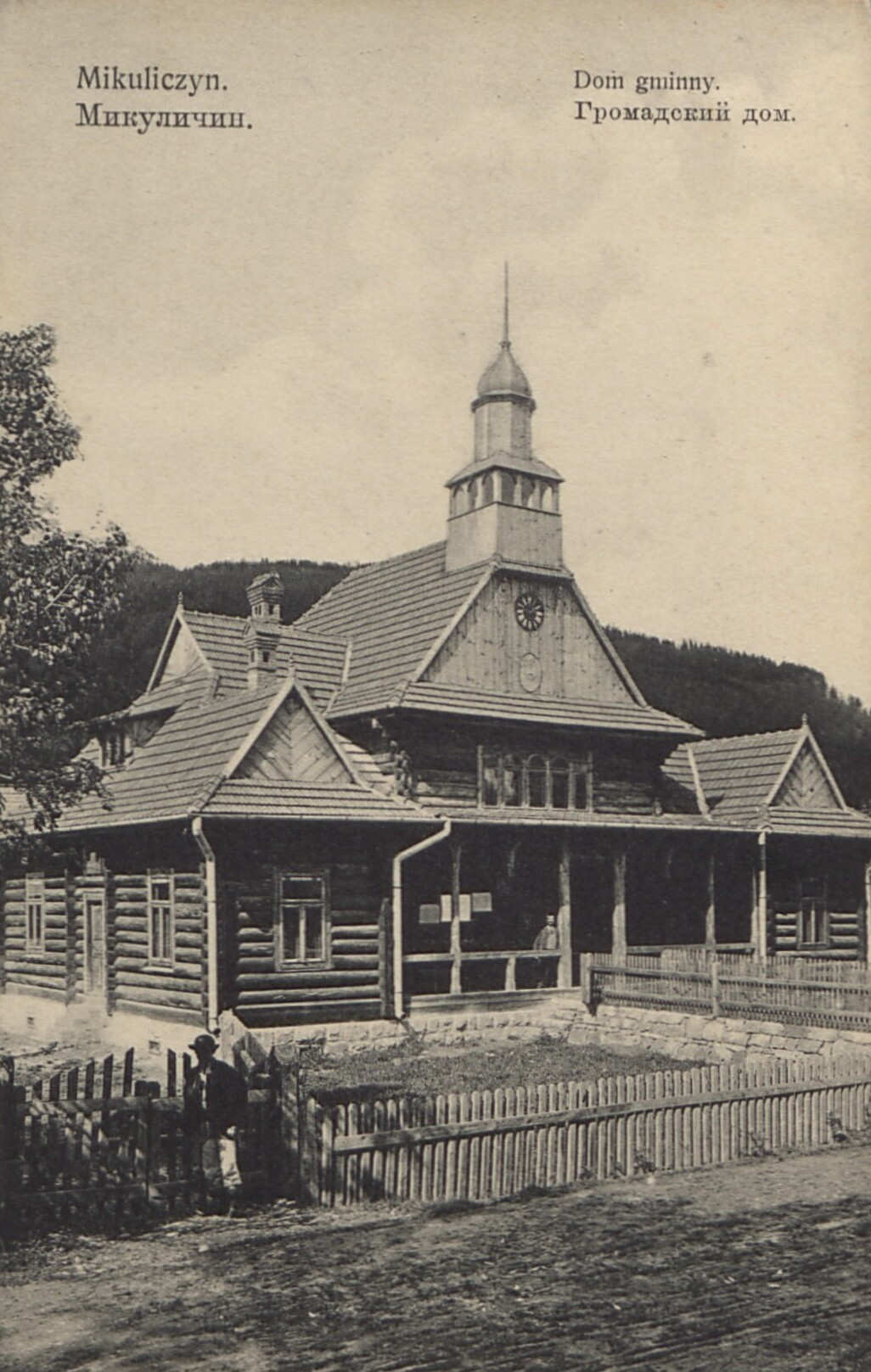
Commune house, circa 1925

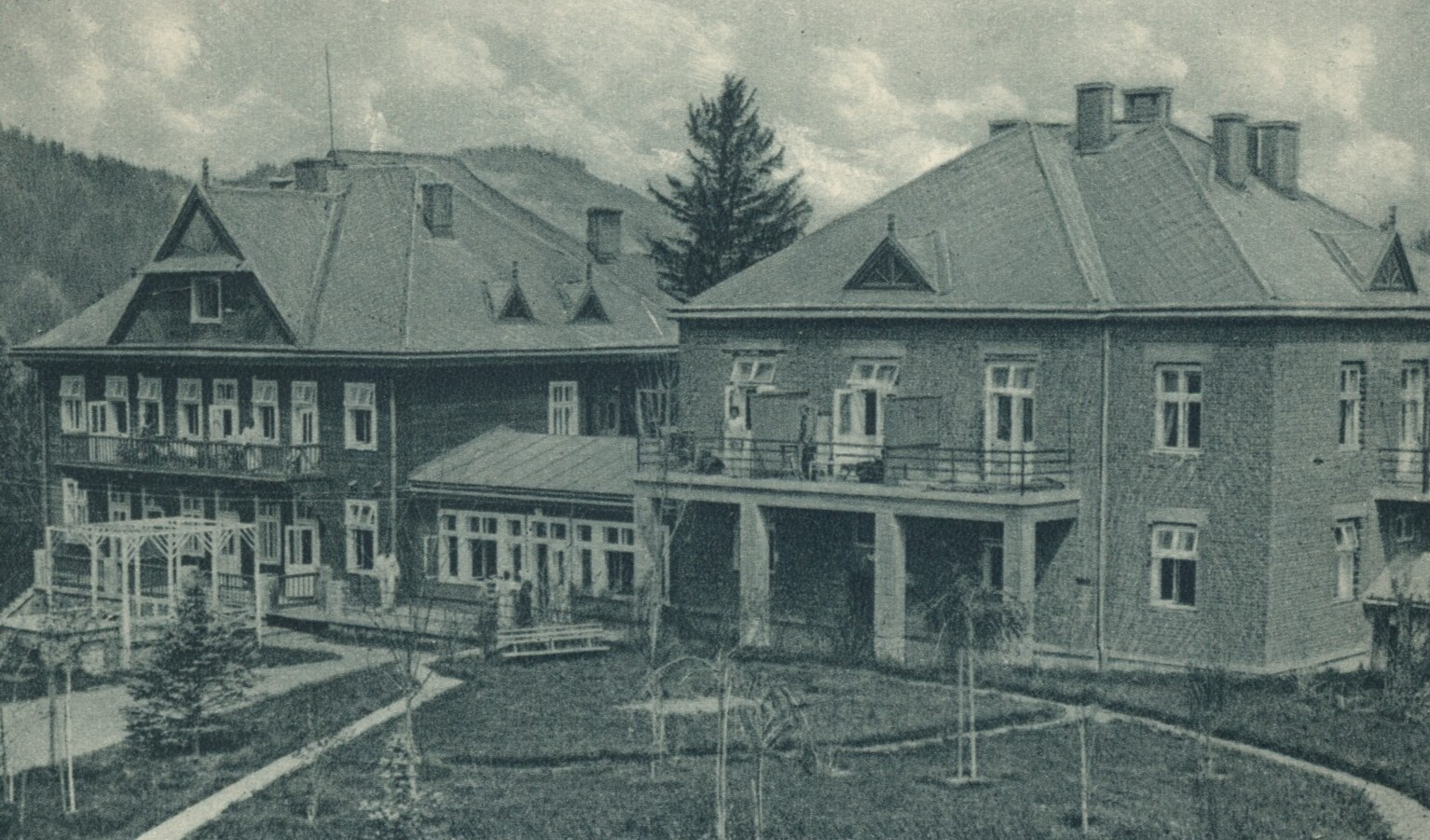
House of Lviv academicians, 1939

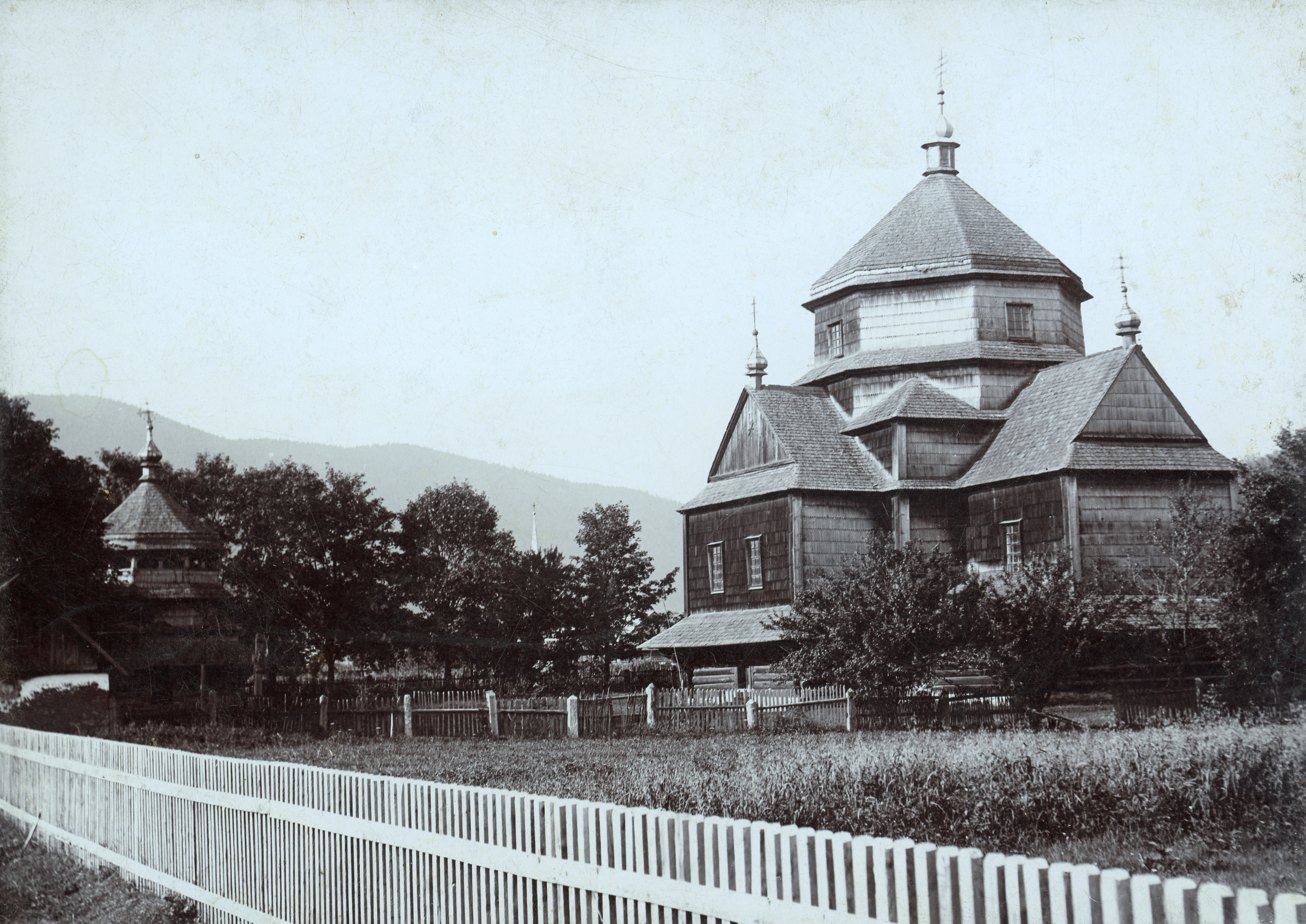
Orthodox church, 1914

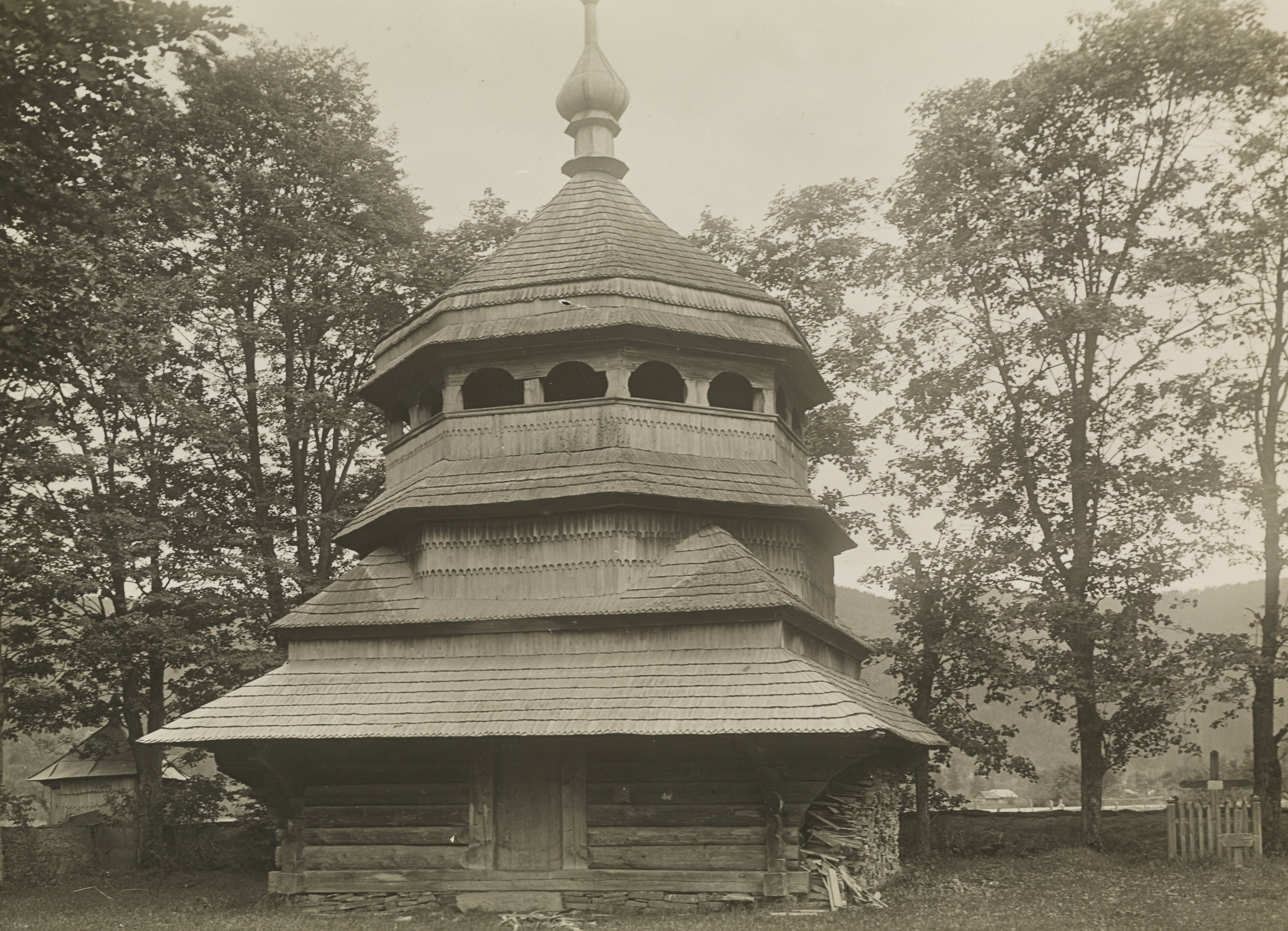
The bell tower, before 1939

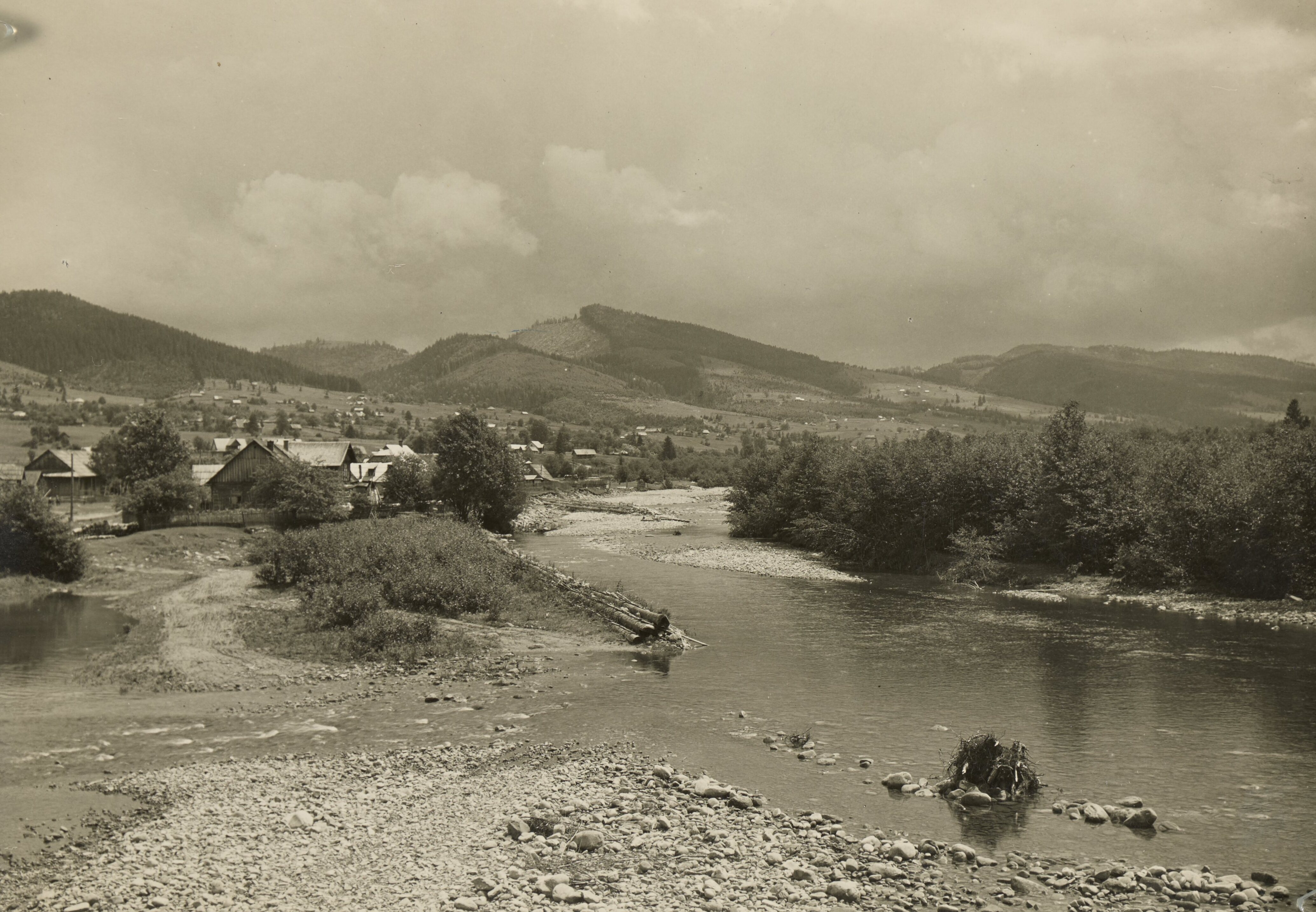
River Prut near Mykulychyn

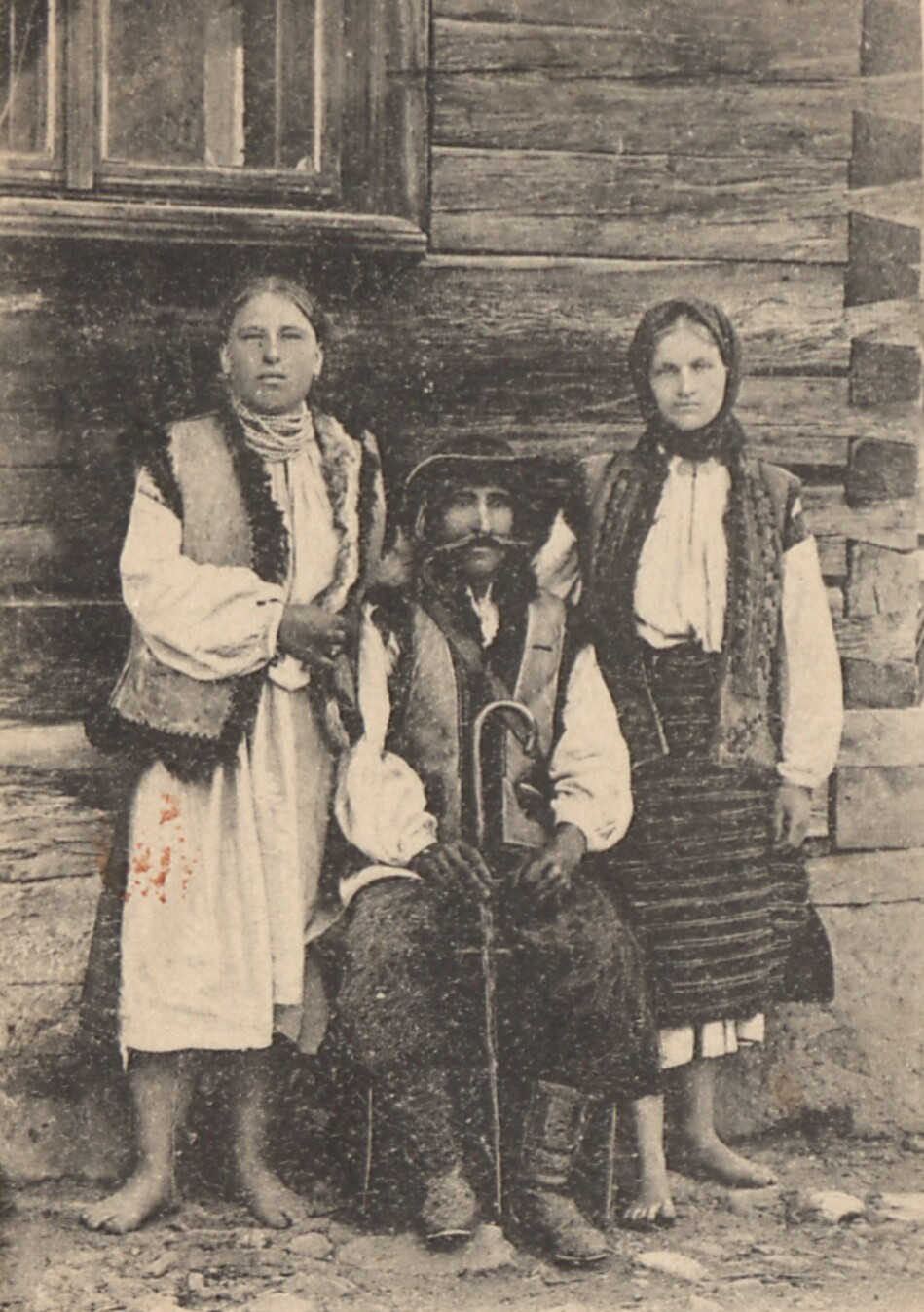
Hutsuls from Mykulychyn, 1901

== Religion ==
- Holy Trinity church with a bell tower (1868, wooden; architect Y. Chaikovetskyi, iconostasis painted by Kornylo Ustiyanovych, architectural monument of national importance; UGCC),
- Church of the Ascension (2000s),
- Monastery of the Congregation of Sisters Servants of the Immaculate Virgin Mary (1927, on the initiative of Metropolitan Andrey Sheptytsky).

== Notable residents ==
The village was visited by Ukrainian writers Vasyl Stefanyk and Bohdan Lepkyi, as well as in 1875 by publicist Mykhailo Drahomanov, in 1890 by English writer Ménie Muriel Dowie (she left a mention in her book "A Girl in the Carpa-thians", published in 1891), and in 1912 by the future emperor of Austria-Hungary Charles I and his wife. The writer Iryna Vilde lived there.

== Sources ==
- "Mikuliczyn". Geographical Dictionary of the Kingdom of Poland (in Polish). 6. Warszawa: Kasa im. Józefa Mianowskiego. 1885. p. 411.
