= Yaremche urban hromada =

Urban hromada of Ivano-Frankivsk Oblast, Ukraine

Yaremche urban hromada Яремчанська міська громада
- Hromada
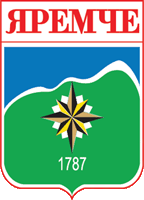
- Seal
- Interactive map of Yaremche urban hromada
- Country: Ukraine
- Oblast: Ivano-Frankivsk
- Raion: Nadvirna

Area
  - Total: 270.8 km^{2} (104.6 sq mi)

Population (2023)
  - Total: 13,075
  - Density: 48.28/km^{2} (125.1/sq mi)
- Settlements: 2
- Cities: 1
- Villages: 1
- Website: yaremcha-miskrada.gov.ua

Yaremche urban territorial hromada (Ukrainian: Яремча́нська міська́ територіальна грома́да, romanized: Yaremchanska miska terytorialna hromada) is one of the hromadas of Ukraine, located in Nadvirna Raion within the country's western Ivano-Frankivsk Oblast. Its capital is the city of Yaremche.

The hromada has an area of 270.8 km^{2} (104.6 mi^{2}), as well as a population of 13,075 (as of 2023).

== Composition ==
In addition to one city (Yaremche), the hromada contains the village of Mykulychyn.
