= Carpathian National Nature Park =

National park in Ukraine

- Карпатський національний природний парк
- IUCN category II (national park)
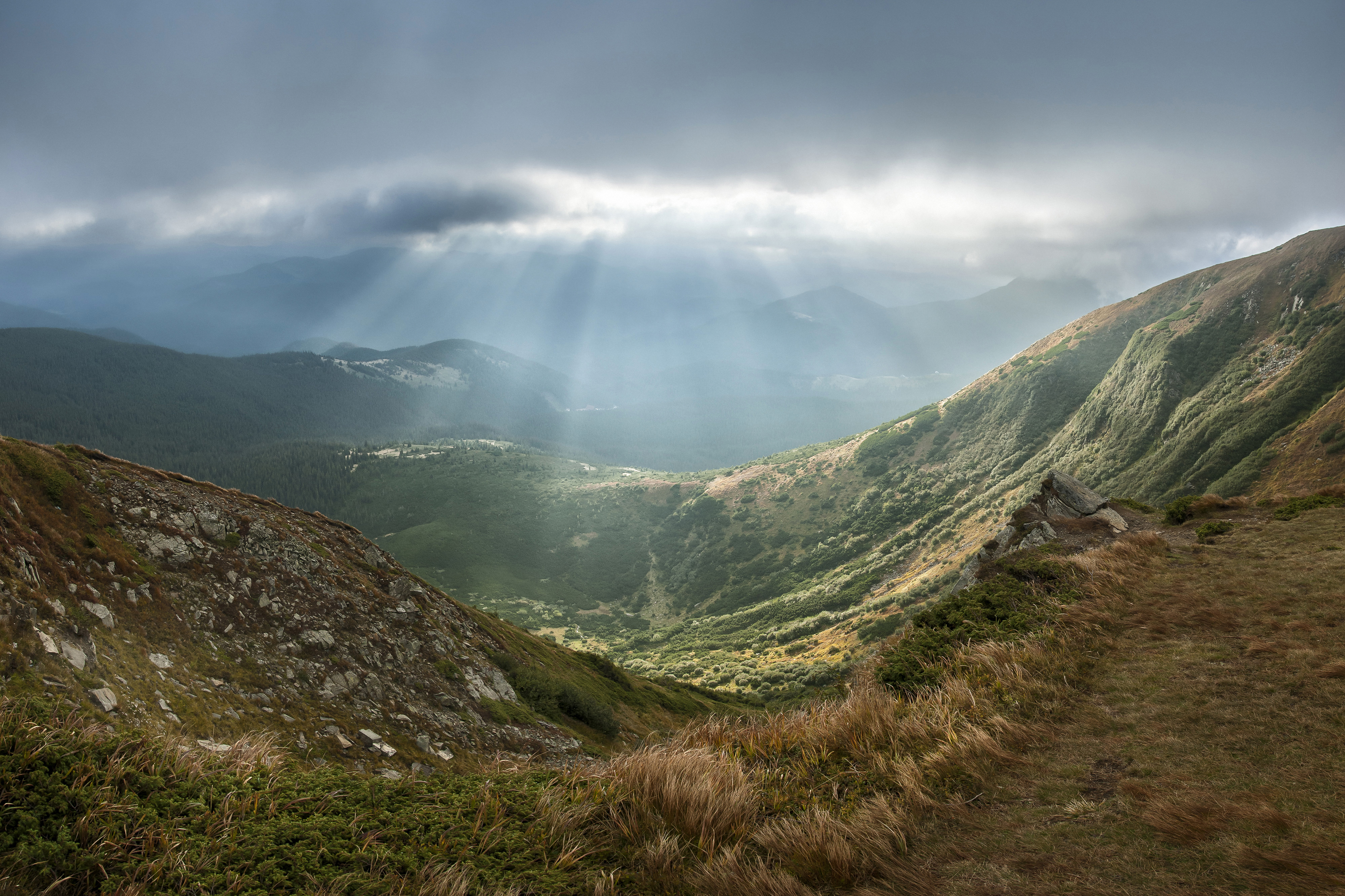
- View from Mount Hoverla

- Location within Ukraine
- Location: Yaremche, Ivano-Frankivsk Oblast, Ukraine
- Coordinates: 48°22′58″N 24°32′38″E
- Area: 515.7 square kilometres (199.1 mi^{2})
- Designation: National Park
- Established: June 3, 1980

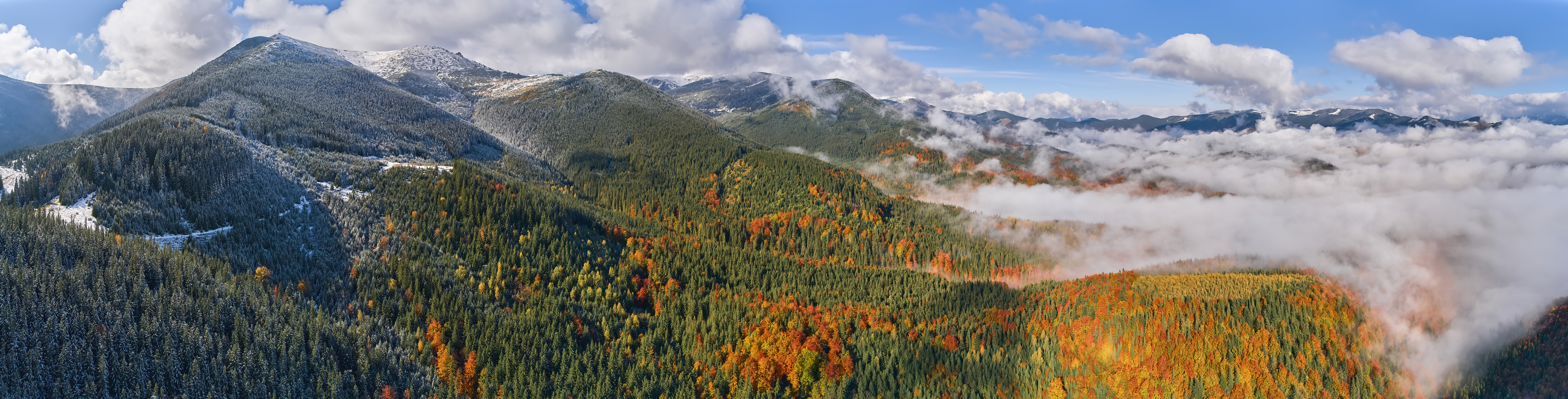
First snow on Chornohirsky Ridge

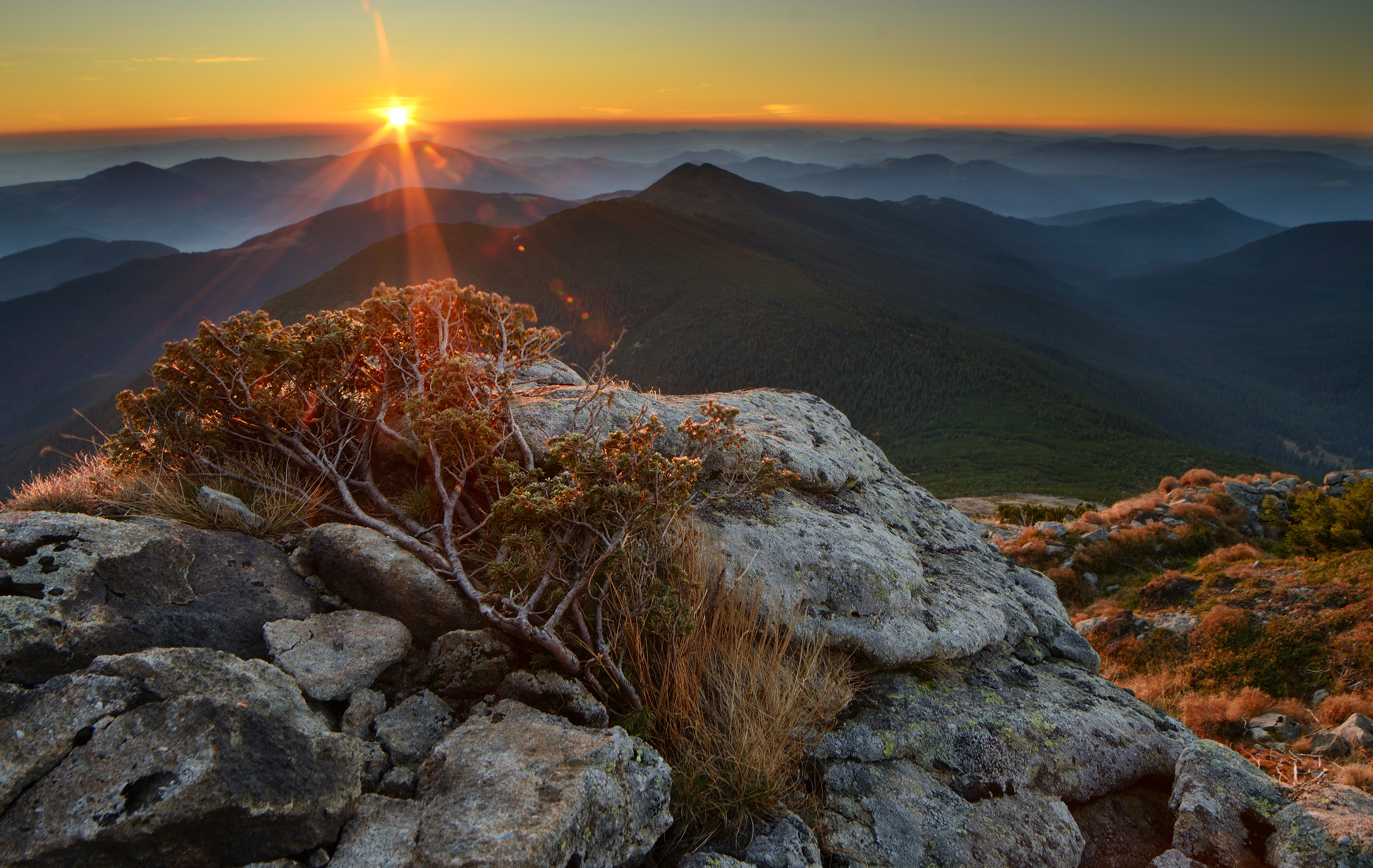
Dawn in Carpathian National Nature Park

The Carpathian National Nature Park (Ukrainian: Карпатський національний природний парк) is a National Park located in Ivano-Frankivsk Oblast, Ukraine. The park was established on 3 June 1980 to protect landscapes of the Carpathian Mountains. The headquarters of the park are in Yaremche. Carpathian National Nature Park is the first national park of Ukraine and one of the biggest national parks of the country.

== Topography ==
The area of the park is shared between Nadvirna Raion and Verkhovyna Raion in the southwest of Ivano-Frankivsk Oblast, at the border with Zakarpattia Oblast. The area of the park is 515.7 square kilometres (199.1 mi^{2}), of which 3,834 square kilometres (1,480 mi^{2}) is the area where any economic activity is prohibited. The park is located in the highest part of the Ukrainian Carpathians, on the eastern slopes in the drainage basins of the Prut River and the Black Cheremosh River. The Prut has its source in the park, and the highest point of Ukraine, Mount Hoverla (2,061 metres (6,762 ft)), is located at the borders of the park. The lowest point of the park is about 500 metres (1,600 ft).

In 1921, in the highest part of the Ukrainian Carpathians a nature reservation was created which originally had the area of 4.47 square kilometres (1.73 mi^{2}). In 1968, it was merged into the newly created Carpathian State Reserve. Carpathian National Nature Park was established in 1980 by the decree of the Council of Ministers of Ukrainian Soviet Socialist Republic, and included about a half of the area which previously belonged to the Carpathian State Reserve. The park is an independent unit subordinated to the Ministry of Ecology and Natural Resources of Ukraine.

== Ecoregion and climate ==
The park is in the Carpathian montane forests ecoregion. Because of its altitude, the climate of the Carpathian Park is Subarctic climate, without dry season (Köppen climate classification Subarctic climate (Dfc)). This climate is characterized by mild summers (only 1–3 months above 10 °C (50.0 °F)) and cold, snowy winters (coldest month below −3 °C (26.6 °F)).

== Flora and fauna ==
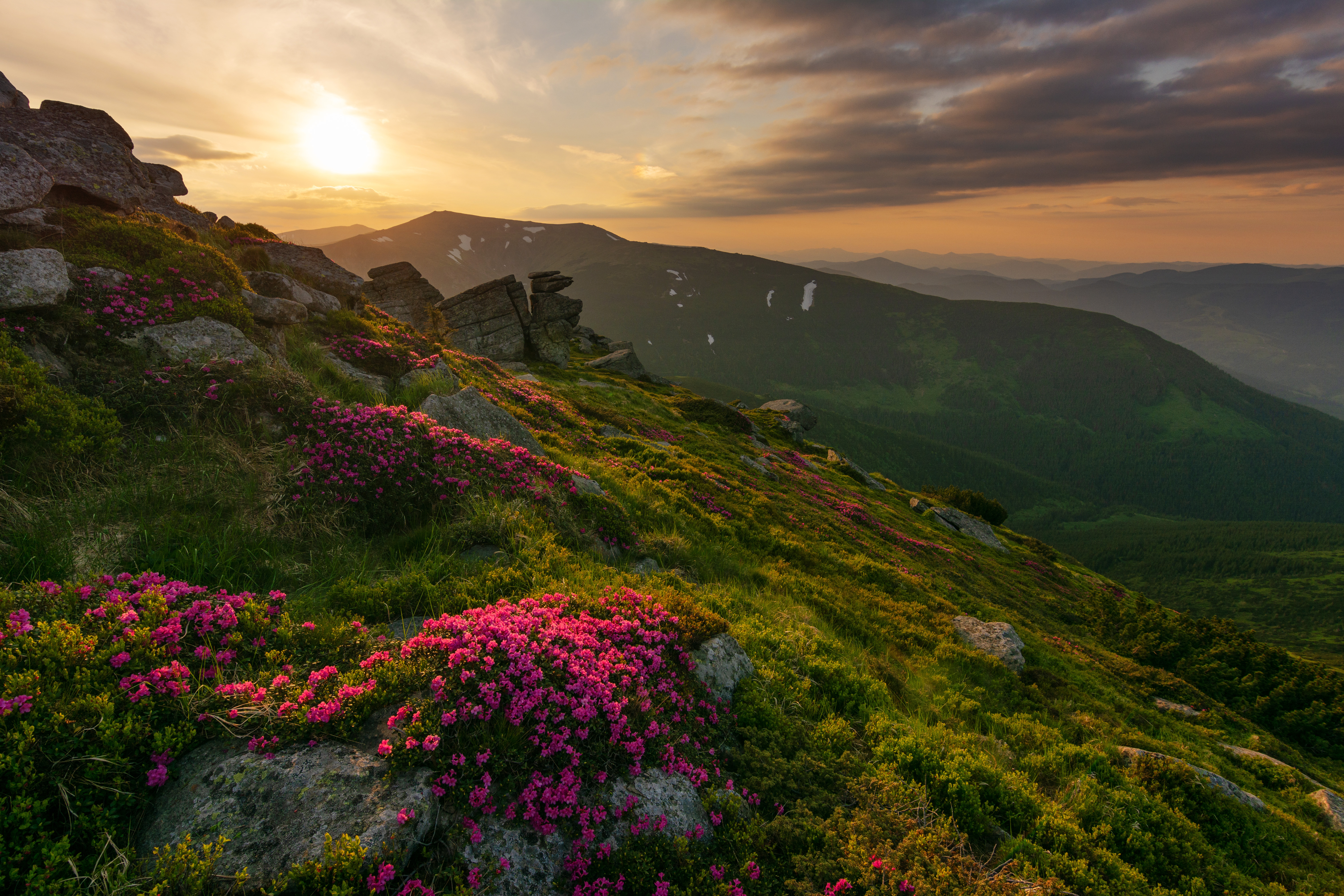
Rhododendron flowers in the Carpathian National Nature Park, Western Ukraine

The landscapes in the park include Alpine meadows and forests. The three most common tree species in the park are silver fir, European beech, and spruce. The Huk Waterfall, located within the park, is the highest single-drop waterfall in the Ukrainian Carpathians (84 metres (276 ft)). There are two lakes of glacial origin.

== Public use ==
The area of the Carpathian National Nature Park was historically inhabited by hutsuls and contains a number of monuments of history and architecture, including historical wooden buildings. It is actively used for tourism, with 48 maintained trails (as of 2012).

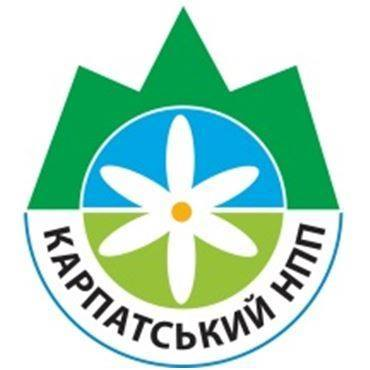
park logo

== See also ==
- Biały Słoń
