= Yaremche =

Urban locality in Ivano-Frankivsk Oblast, Ukraine

Yaremche Яремчe Jaremcze
- town
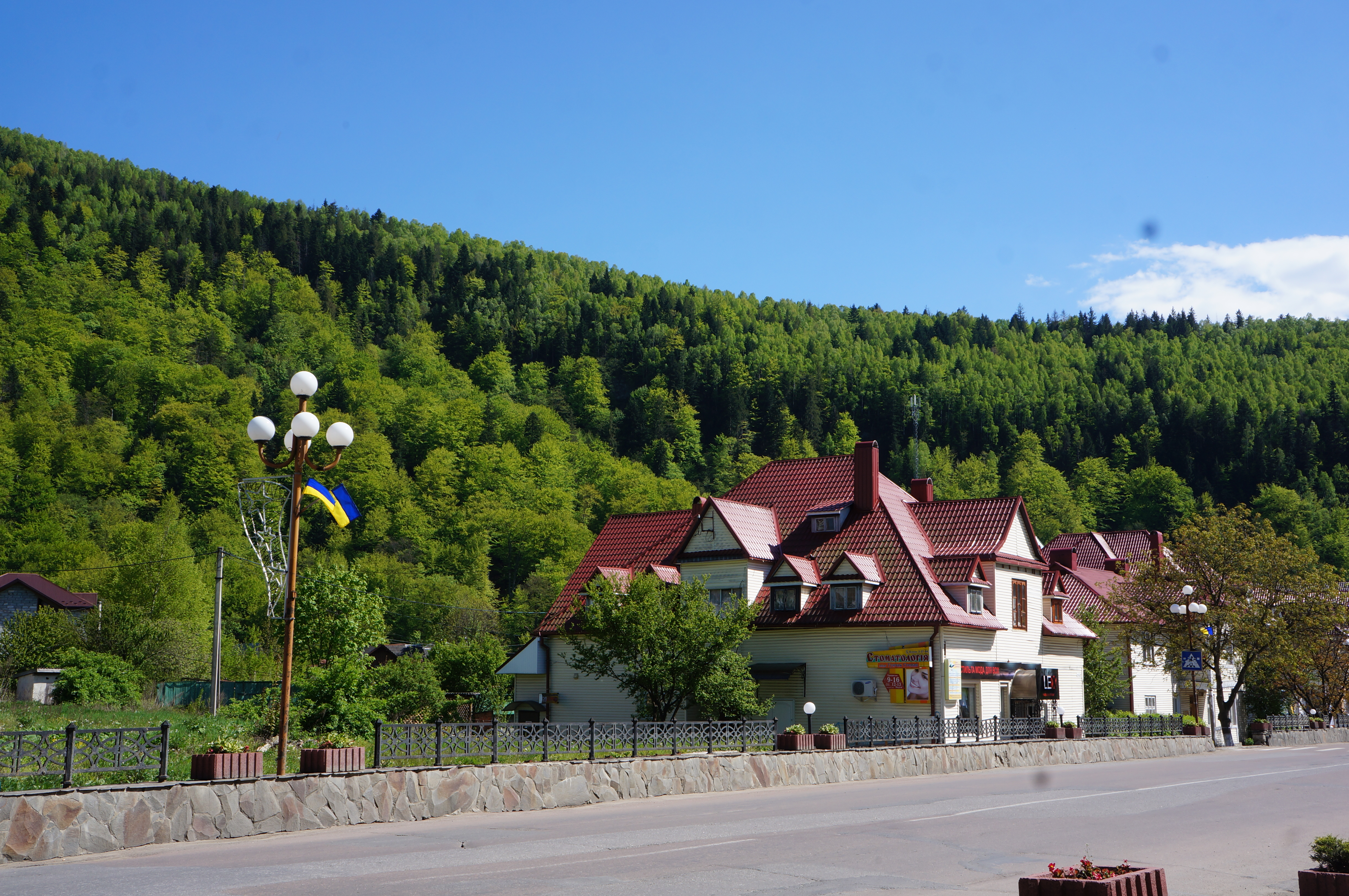
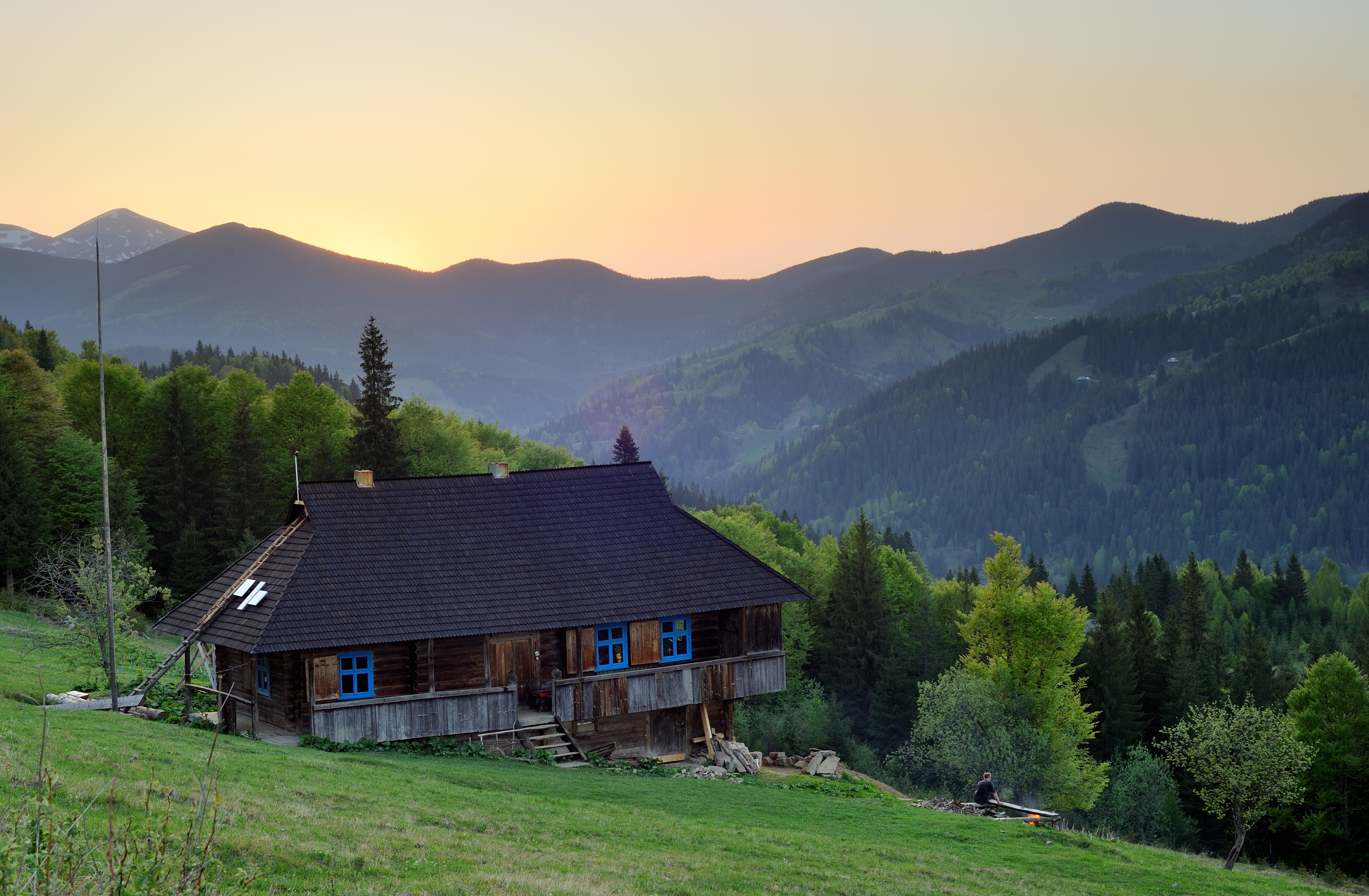
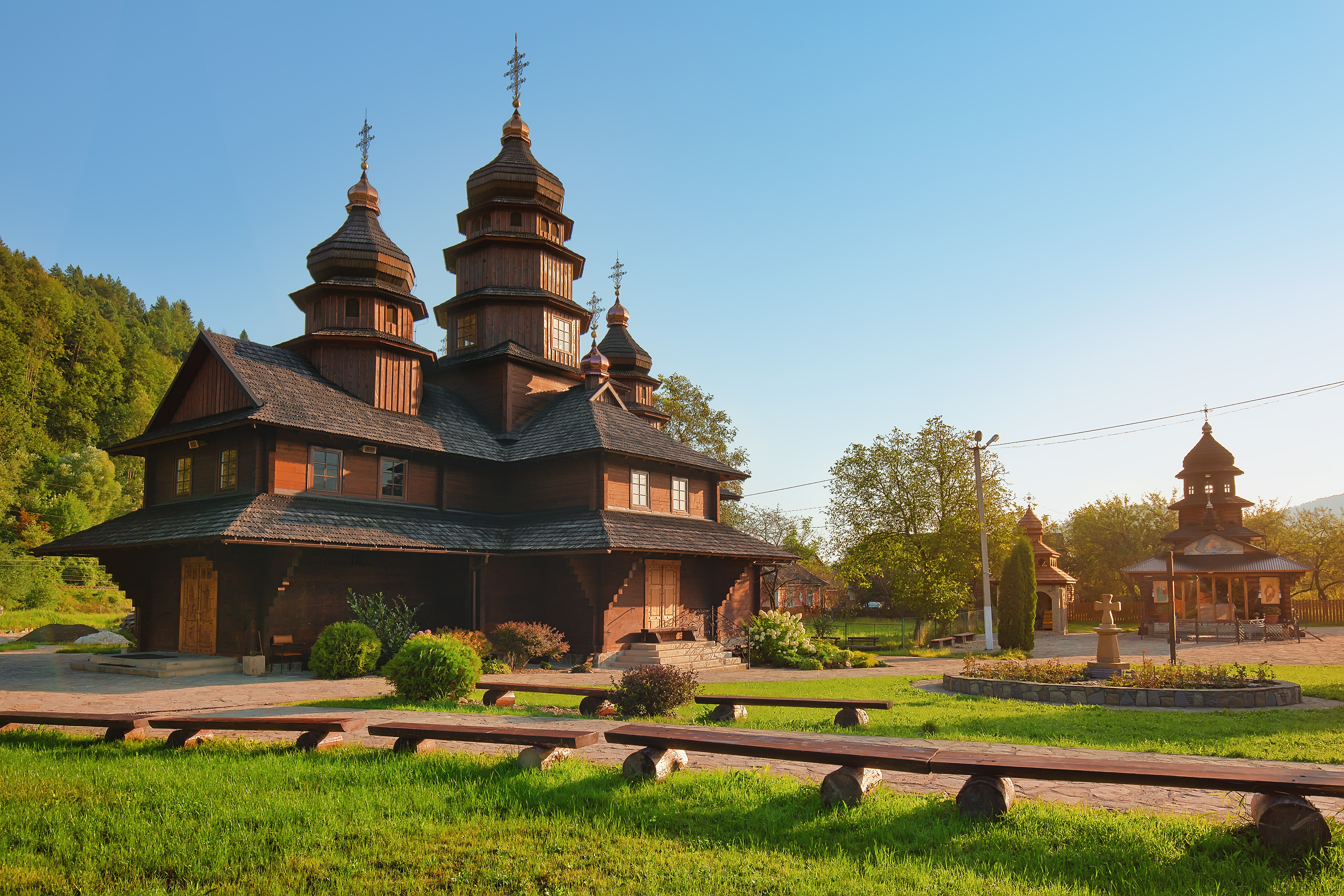
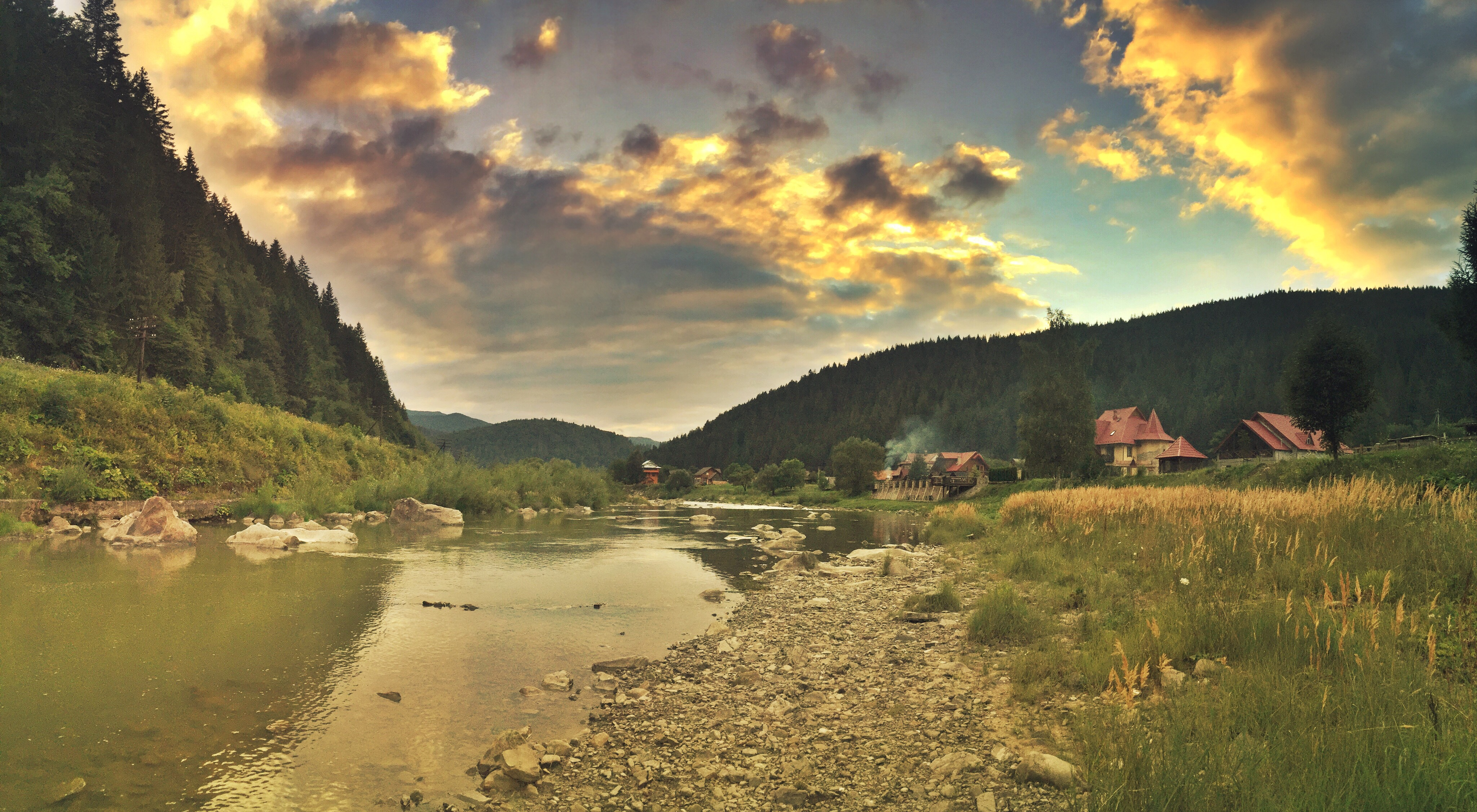
- Clockwise from top: Shops; Saint Elijah Church; Prut River; Tourist hotel in the Carpathian National Nature Park

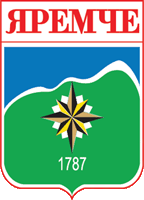
- Flag Coat of arms

- Location of Yaremche, Ukraine Yaremche (Ukraine)
- Coordinates: 48°27′37″N 24°33′31″E
- Country: Ukraine
- Oblast: Ivano-Frankivsk Oblast
- Raion: Nadvirna Raion
- Hromada: Yaremche urban hromada
- Established: 1787

Area
  - Total: 657 km^{2} (254 sq mi)
- Elevation: 585 m (1,919 ft)

Population (2022)
  - Total: 7,907
  - Density: 12.0/km^{2} (31.2/sq mi)
- Time zone: UTC+2 (EET)
  - Summer (DST): UTC+3 (EEST)
- Postal index: 78501
- Area code: +380-3434

Yaremche (Ukrainian: Яремче, IPA: [jɐˈrɛmtʃe]; Polish: Jaremcze or Jaremcza) is a town in Nadvirna Raion, Ivano-Frankivsk Oblast (province) of west Ukraine. The Town is located at the altitude of around 580 metres (1,900 ft) above mean sea level. Yaremche hosts the administration of Yaremche urban hromada, one of the hromadas of Ukraine. Population: 7,907 (2022 estimate).

Yaremche hosts the headquarters of the nearby Carpathian National Nature Park.

== History ==
Historical population
Year	Pop.	±%
2007	11,926	—
2008	11,956	+0.3%
2009	12,007	+0.4%
2010	12,091	+0.7%
2016	12,478	+3.2%
Note: Population of Vorokhta included 2010 data is valid thru October; Source: Regional Statistics Office

A possible root of the word "Yaremche" comes from the Turkish. In Turkic languages "yarım" means "half" and "yarımca" means "little half". It was founded in 1787, when the region formed part of Galicia in the Habsburg Monarchy, and received city status on 30 December 1977. In the interwar period (1918–1939) it belonged to Poland and was the most popular tourist center in eastern part of the Carpathian Mountains (in the late 1920s more than 6 000 guests came there yearly). Yaremche was growing year by year in importance and number of tourists. According to some, it had the chance to achieve same importance as other key Polish mountain spas, Zakopane and Krynica. However, in September 1939 it became a part of Soviet Union as part of the Ukrainian SSR under the Ribbentrop-Molotov partition plan for the division of Poland between Germany and the Soviets. During the World War II it was occupied by the Nazis as part of the Distrikt Galizien and most of its Jewish population was slaughtered by Nazi SS units along with a Ukrainian volunteer militia, and Hungarian Border Patrol troops. It was liberated by the Soviet forces in 1944. On 30 December 1977, the city of Yaremcha became a municipality within Ivano-Frankivsk Oblast. Since 1991 it has been a part of independent Ukraine.

There are a number of interesting houses with long sloping roofs. There is a wooden Orthodox church and an impressive rail viaduct, located over the Prut valley at the height of 30 meters (98 feet). Next to this there is a swinging pedestrian toll bridge.

On 14 December 2006, the Parliament of Ukraine, officially renamed the city from Yaremcha to Yaremche. The decision was based on the results of a city referendum, as well as the recommendations of City Council, and Ivano-Frankivsk Oblast Council.

Until 18 July 2020, Yaremche was incorporated as a city of oblast significance and was the center of Yaremche Municipality which also included the urban-type settlement of Vorokhta, a ski resort, and five other villages: Mykulychyn, Polianytsia, Tatariv, Voronenko, and Yablunytsia. The municipality was abolished in July 2020 as part of the administrative reform of Ukraine, which reduced the number of raions of Ivano-Frankivsk Oblast to six. The area of Yaremche Municipality was merged into Nadvirna Raion.

== Gallery ==
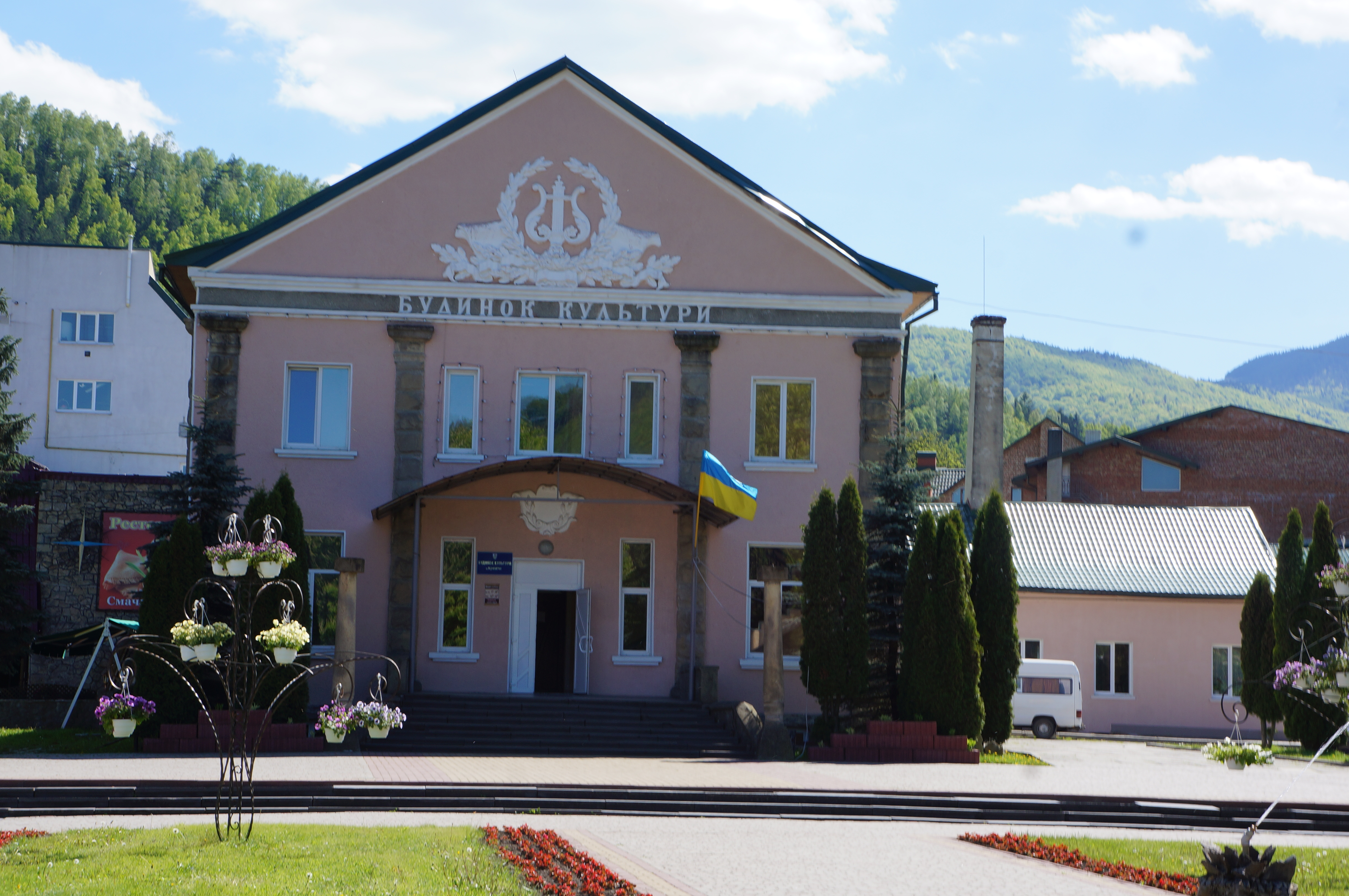
House of Culture

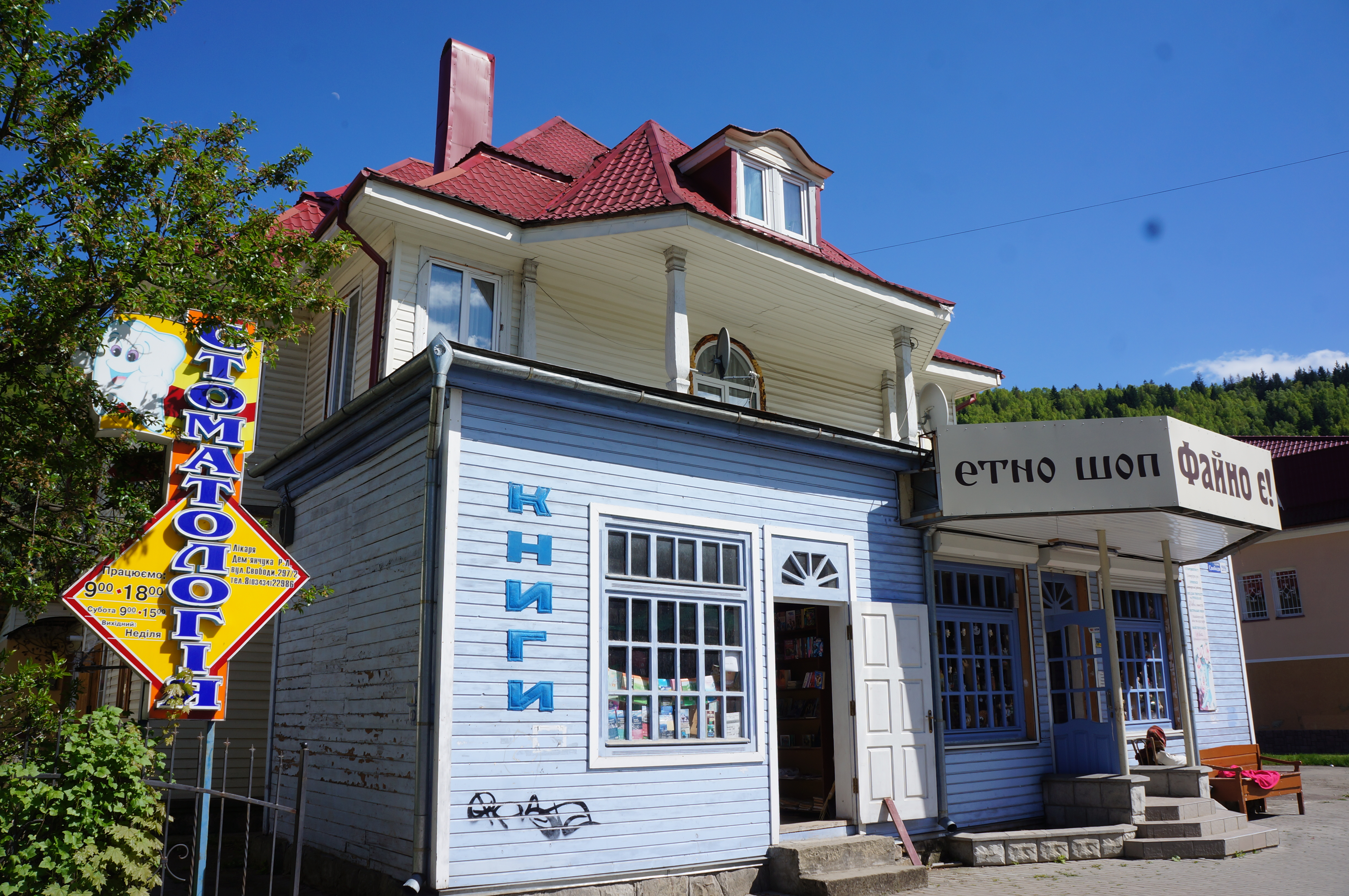
Shops

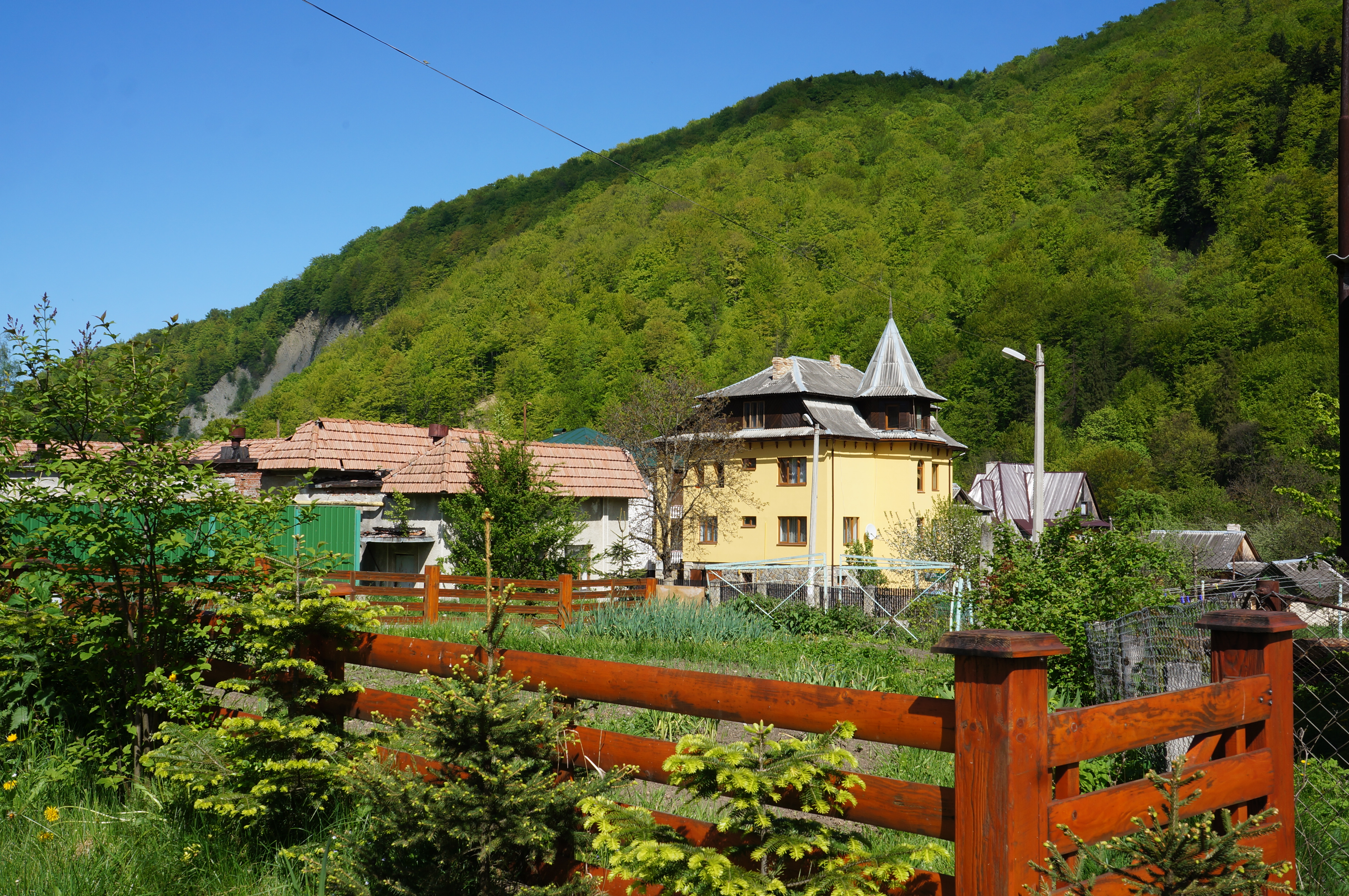
Residential houses

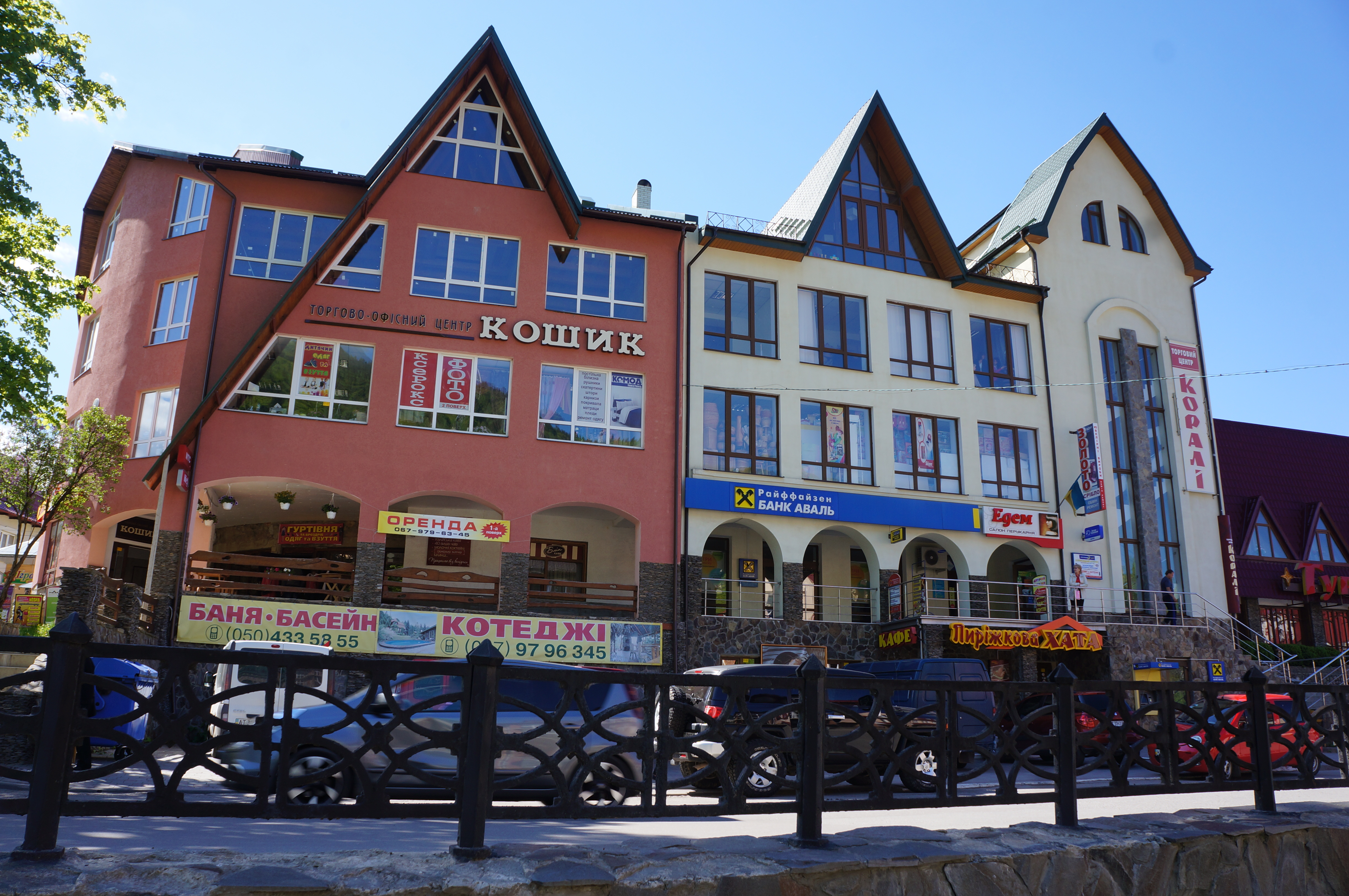
Shops and bank

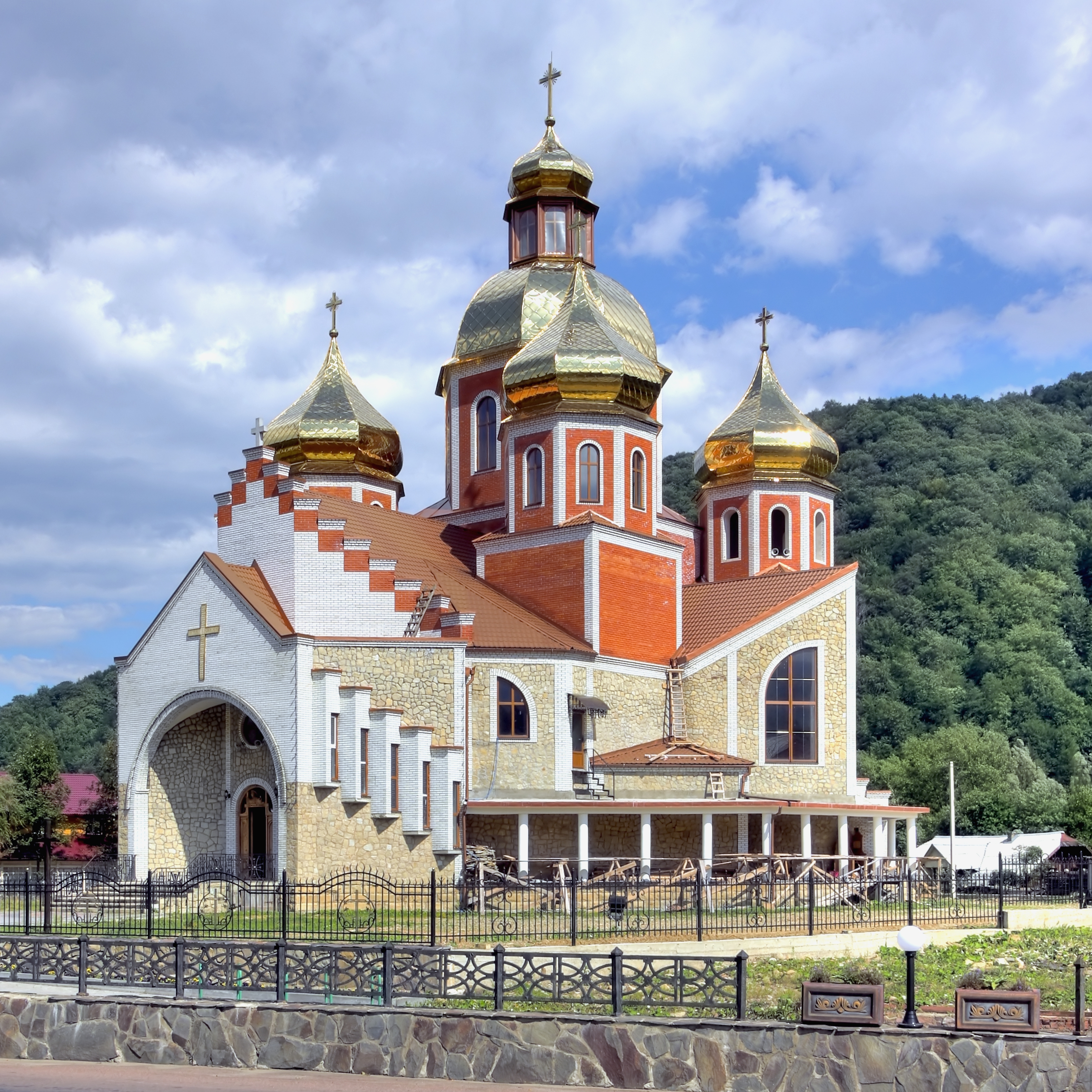
Greek Catholic church

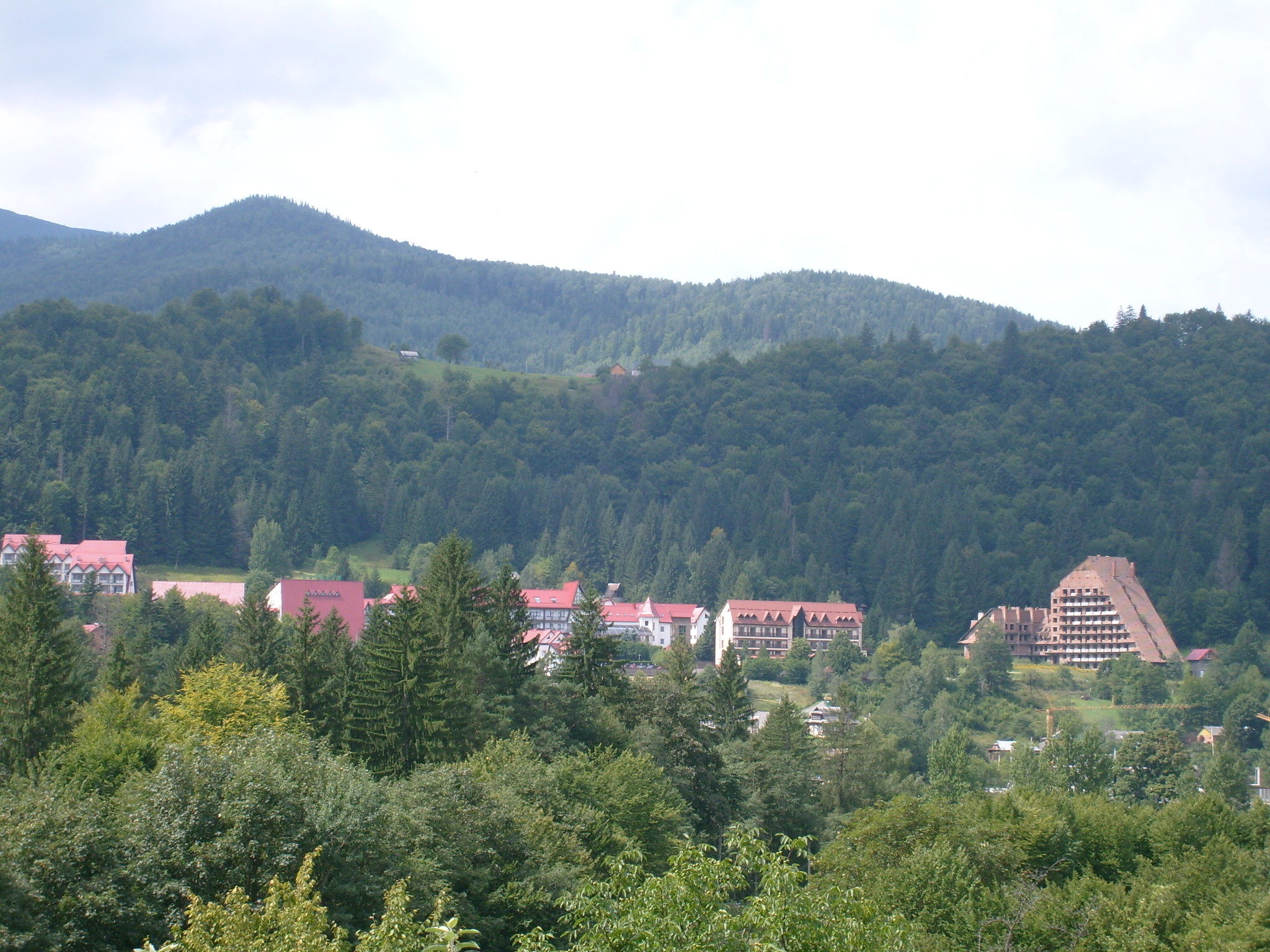
Panorama

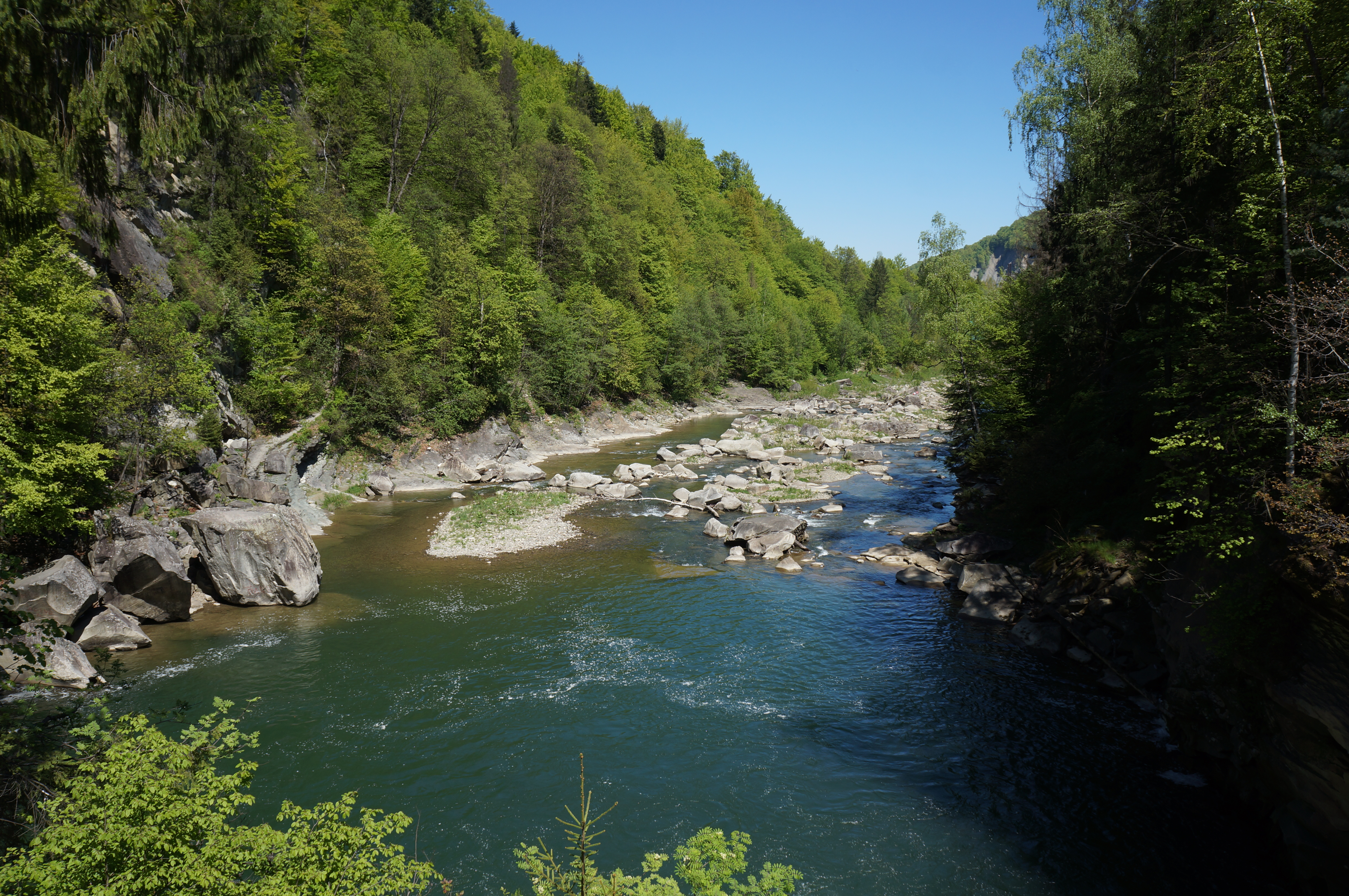
Prut river in Yaremche

== Geography ==
=== Location ===
Local orientation

Regional orientation
