= Romodanovo =

Romodanovo (Russian: Ромоданово) is the name of several rural localities in Russia:

- Romodanovo, Republic of Mordovia, a settlement in Romodanovsky District of the Republic of Mordovia
- Romodanovo, Rybnovsky District, Ryazan Oblast, a village in Poshchupovsky Rural Okrug of Rybnovsky District in Ryazan Oblast
- Romodanovo (khutor), Starozhilovsky District, Ryazan Oblast, a khutor under the administrative jurisdiction of Starozhilovo Work Settlement in Starozhilovsky District of Ryazan Oblast
- Romodanovo (selo), Starozhilovsky District, Ryazan Oblast, a selo under the administrative jurisdiction of Starozhilovo Work Settlement in Starozhilovsky District of Ryazan Oblast
- Romodanovo, Smolensk Oblast, a village in Romodanovskoye Rural Settlement of Glinkovsky District in Smolensk Oblast
