= Pyotr Lyapin =

Pyotr Ivanovich Lyapin
- Born: 25 June 1894; Romodanovo, Saransk Uyezd, Penza Governorate, Russian Empire
- Died: 12 January 1954 (aged 59); Rostov–on–Don, Russian Soviet Federative Socialist Republic, Soviet Union
- Military career
- Allegiance: Russian Empire; Soviet Union
- Branch: Infantry; Airborne Troops
- Service years: 1916–1918; 1918–1952
- Rank: Senior Non–Commissioned Officer; Lieutenant General
- Commands: 27th Rifle Regiment; 4th Army; 7th Airborne Corps; 2nd Guards Airborne Division
- Conflicts: World War I; Russian Civil War; World War II; Eastern Front
- Awards: Order of Lenin; Order of the Red Banner; Order of Kutuzov; Order of Suvorov; Order of the Cross of Grunwald Medals: Jubilee Medal "XX Years of the Workers' and Peasants' Red Army"; Medal "For the Defence of Leningrad"; Medal "For the Defence of Moscow"; Medal "For the Victory Over Germany in the Great Patriotic War of 1941–1945"; Jubilee Medal "30 Years of the Soviet Army and Navy"; Medal "Victory and Freedom"; Medal "For Oder, Nisa and Baltic"

Pyotr Ivanovich Lyapin (Russian: Пётр Иванович Ляпин; 25 June 1894 – 12 January 1954) was a Soviet military leader, Lieutenant General (2 November 1944).

== Early biography ==
Pyotr Ivanovich Lyapin was born on 25 June 1894, in the village of Romodanovo, Penza Governorate (now in the Romodanovsky District, Mordovia) into a peasant family.

== Military service ==
=== World War I and Civil War ===
In January 1916, he was drafted into the ranks of the Russian Imperial Army, after which he was sent as a private to the 101st Reserve Infantry Regiment in Saransk. In September of the same year, he graduated from the training detachment, promoted to junior non–commissioned officers. Since May 1917, as part of the 754th Tulchin Infantry Regiment, he fought on the Romanian Front, became a platoon commander at the front and rose to the rank of senior non–commissioned officer. In 1917, he was elected to the company and regimental soldiers' committees, in November – December 1917, he served as chairman of the regimental committee. In January 1918, he was demobilized with the rank of senior non–commissioned officer.

He returned to his homeland, was actively involved in public work and was elected a member of the volost committee. In the summer of 1918, he took part in the 5th All–Russian Congress of Soviets in Moscow. As part of a larger group of congress participants, he participated in the suppression of the Rebellion of the Left Socialist Revolutionaries in Moscow.

In August 1918, he joined the ranks of the Workers' and Peasants' Red Army. He served as a platoon instructor for General Education at the district military commissariat in Saransk. Then in December of the same year, he was sent to the Western Front, where he served as Commander of a Rifle Company of the 3rd Rifle Regiment of the Railway Defense, from May 1919 – Political Commissar of the 4th Rifle Regiment of Railway Defense, from October 1919 – Assistant Military Commissar of the 102nd Separate Rifle Battalion, from January 1920 – Military Commissar of the 107th Separate Rifle Battalion, from May 1920 – Commander of the 24th Separate Rifle Battalion.

=== Interwar period ===
In November 1920, Lyapin was appointed Battalion Commander of the 265th Rifle Regiment of the Internal Service (North Caucasian Military District), from April 1921 – to the post of Assistant Commander of the 289th Rifle Regiment (33rd Rifle Division), from May 1921 – for the post of Commander of the 577th Rifle Regiment (133rd Rifle Brigade), from June 1921 – for the post of Commander of the 337th Rifle Regiment (113th Rifle Brigade). In November 1921, he was appointed to the post of Assistant Commander of the Training and Personnel Regiment of the 28th Rifle Division, and in June 1922 – to the post of Battalion Commander of the 84th Rifle Regiment as part of the same division, since June 1923, he temporarily served as chief of the division schools, and from September 1924, he served as Assistant Commander of the 84th Rifle Regiment.

After completing the advanced training courses for the command personnel "Shot" in January 1925, he was sent to the 9th Rifle Division, where he served as Commander of the 27th Rifle Regiment, in October 1926, he was appointed to the post of Assistant Commander of the 25th Infantry Regiment for the economic part, and in January 1927 – for the post of Assistant Chief of the 4th Department of the Headquarters of the North Caucasian Military District.

In 1928, Lyapin was sent to study at the Mikhail Frunze Military Academy of the Workers' and Peasants' Red Army, after which in March 1931, he was appointed Chief of Staff of the 45th Rifle Division (Ukrainian Military District).

Since November 1932, he studied at the adjuncture of the Military Academy of the Workers' and Peasants' Red Army Named After Mikhail Frunze and in April 1934, he was appointed Senior Head of the Department of Mechanization and Motorization of the same academy, but in May of the same year, he was transferred to the post of Chief of Staff of the 15th Rifle Corps, in November 1938, he was appointed Senior Lecturer of the General Tactics Department of the Mikhail Frunze Military Academy, in October 1939 – to the position of Chief of Staff of the Odessa Military District, and in July 1940 – to the position of Chief of Staff of the 10th Army (Western Special Military District).

=== Great Patriotic War ===
With the beginning of the war, Lyapin was in his previous position and in June 1941, he was surrounded, but led a group of fighters and commanders of the 10th Army, which was fighting against superior German forces, and then withdrew from the encirclement. After leaving the encirclement in July, he was appointed Chief of Staff of the Reserve Front, in August – to the position of Chief of Staff of the 52nd, and in October – Chief of Staff of the 4th Armies, which was deployed on the right bank of the Volkhov River from the city of Kirishi to the populated point Gruzino (west of the city of Chudovo), covering the direction Budogosh – Tikhvin. General Lyapin took part in the development of plans for the Tikhvin Defensive and Offensive Operations.

In December 1941, he was appointed to the post of Assistant Commander of the Volkhov Front, in January 1942 – to the post of Assistant to the Commander of the 59th Army, and in February – to the post of Commander of the 4th Army, however, in June by the Military Council of the Volkhov Front, Lyapin was removed from the position held.

In August 1942, he was appointed Commander of the 7th Airborne Corps, and in December – the 2nd Airborne Division, formed from the corps after its disbandment. However, in March 1943, Major General Pyotr Lyapin was removed from his post and enlisted in the Reserve of the Military Council of the 1st Shock Army, then the Main Personnel Directorate of the People's Commissariat of Defense of the Soviet Union and the Military Council of the Western Front. In April of the same year, on the instructions of the Military Council of the Western Front, he worked on inspecting the defenses of the 11th Guards, 10th and 49th Armies.

In September 1943, he was appointed Chief of Staff of the 63rd Army, and from February 1944, he was at the disposal of the Main Personnel Directorate of the People's Commissariat of Defense and in June was appointed Chief of Staff of the 70th Army, which took part in the Lublin–Brest Offensive Operation, and in March 1945 – for the post of Chief of Staff of the 19th Army, which took part in the East Pomeranian Offensive Operation and the defeat of the enemy forces on the western coast of the Danzig Bay.

=== Post–war career ===
In July 1945, Lieutenant General Lyapin was appointed Chief of Staff of the Kazan Military District, and in June 1946 – Chief of Staff of the Volga Military District. Since October 1949, he was at the disposal of the Minister of Defense and in December of the same year, he was appointed to the post of Assistant Commander of the Don Military District.

Lieutenant General Pyotr Lyapin retired in August 1952. He died on 12 January 1954, in Rostov–on–Don. Buried at the Brethren Cemetery.

== Awards ==
- Two Orders of Lenin (2 March 1938, 21 February 1945);
- Four Orders of the Red Banner (28 October 1937, 3 November 1944, 29 May 1945, 20 June 1949);
- Order of Kutuzov, 1st (10 April 1945) and 2nd Class (3 June 1944);
- Order of Suvorov, 2nd Class (23 August 1944);
- Medals;
- Polish Awards.

== Military ranks ==
- Colonel (28 February 1936);
- Brigade Commander (17 February 1938);
- Division Commander (25 April 1940);
- Major General (4 June 1940);
- Lieutenant General (2 November 1944).

== Sources ==
- Command and Control Personnel of the Red Army in 1940–1941: Structure and Personnel of the Central Apparatus of the People's Commissariat of Defense of the Soviet Union, Military Districts and Combined–Arms Armies: Documents and Materials / Edited by V. N. Kuzelenkov – Moscow – Saint Petersburg: Summer Garden, 2005 – Page 221 – 1000 Copies – ISBN 5-94381-137-0
- A Team of Authors. The Great Patriotic War. Army Commanders. Military Biographical Dictionary / Edited by Mikhail Vozhakin – Moscow; Zhukovsky: Kuchkovo Field, 2005 – Pages 137–138 – ISBN 5-86090-113-5
- A Team of Authors. The Great Patriotic War: Corps Commanders. Military Biographical Dictionary / Edited by Mikhail Vozhakin – Moscow; Zhukovsky: Kuchkovo Field, 2006 – Volume 2 – Pages 28–30 – ISBN 5-901679-08-3
- Tsapayev, D.A.; et al. (2011). Великая Отечественная: Комдивы. Военный биографический словарь [The Great Patriotic War: Division Commanders. Military Biographical Dictionary] (in Russian). Vol. 1. Moscow: Kuchkovo Pole. ISBN 978-5-9950-0189-8.
- I Am Writing Solely From Memory ... Commanders of the Red Army About the Catastrophe of the First Days of the Great Patriotic War: In 2 Volumes. Volume 1 / Compiled, Author's Preface, Comments and Biographical Sketches by Sergey Chekunov – Moscow: Russian Foundation for the Promotion of Education and Science, 2017 – 560 Pages: Illustrations – ISBN 978-5-91244-208-7, 978-5-91244-209-4 (Volume 1) – Pages 436–515
- Denis Soloviev. All of Stalin's Generals. Volume 8 – Moscow, 2019 – Pages 5–7
