= 2nd Guards Airborne Division =

- Active: 1942–1945
- Country: Soviet Union
- Allegiance: Red Army
- Branch: Airborne
- Size: Division
- Engagements: Demyansk Pocket Battle of Kursk; Battle of the Dnieper; Battle of the Korsun–Cherkassy Pocket; Lvov–Sandomierz Offensive Battle of the Dukla Pass
- Decorations: Order of Suvorov 2nd class
- Battle honours: Proskurov

The 2nd Guards Airborne Division was a division of the Red Army during World War II.

== History ==
The 2nd Guards Airborne Division was formed from 7th Airborne Corps on 8 December 1942 in Zvenigorod. The division was fully equipped by January 1943 and concentrated in the area of Ostashkov. As a part of the 1st Shock Army, the division attacked the Demyansk Pocket on 26 February 1943. The division only advance 3 kilometers against the German forces and was replaced with the 250th Rifle Division after several days of heavy fighting. The division was transferred to the area of Slugin village. The division was now to take Lyahnovo village, which controlled a road out of the Demyansk Pocket. The 5th Guards Airborne Regiment crossed the Porus River and cut the road on 7 March. However, German counterattacks pushed the division out of Lyahnovo. The division was transferred to the rear afterwards.

The division then transferred to the 18th Guards Rifle Corps in the area of Kursk. They took positions in the second defensive line of the 13th Army, part of the Central Front. From 5 July to 23 August, the 2nd Guards Airborne fought in the Battle of Kursk. Between 26 August and 30 September, the division, now part of the 60th Army participated in the capture of Pryluky during the Chernigov-Pripyat Operation. On 2 October, the 7th Guards Airborne Regiment crossed the Dnieper, capturing a bridgehead near the village of Medwin in the Chernobyl Raion. On 18 November, it went to the village of Rakovic. It captured Radomyshl on 20 November as part of the 15th Rifle Corps. In January 1944, it fought in the Battle of the Korsun–Cherkassy Pocket. It captured Khmelnytskyi on 25 March during the Proskurov-Chernivtsi Offensive, for which it was given the title "Proskurov". On 29 March, it captured the villages of Berezhanka and Andriivka in Chemerivtsi Raion, in conjunection with the 62nd Guards Tank Brigade and the 64th Guards Tank Brigade. Between 13 July and 29 August, it fought in the Lvov–Sandomierz Offensive in Ivano-Frankivsk Oblast. As part of the 17th Guards Rifle Corps, it captured the villages of Akreshory and Prokurava on 12 September. With the aid of a Katyusha rocket launcher battery, the division captured the Haarde (mountain) in the Carpathian Mountains on 13 September. On 22 September, the division captured Vorokhta and Yablonitsky Pass. It entered the village of Tatarov on the next day. In October 1944, it fought in the Battle of the Dukla Pass. It captured Mukacheve on 26 October 1944. It captured Uzhhorod on the next day.

The division advanced into Czechoslovakia, capturing Michalovce on 26 November. In conjunction with the 5th Guards Tank Brigade, it captured Kráľovský Chlmec on 27 November. Between December 1944 and January 1945, it crossed the Hornád River and fought south of Košice. On 25 March 1945, it fought in the Moravska Ostrava Operation and seized a bridgehead on the Oder on 19 April. After advancing across Czechoslovakia, the division was disbanded in late June 1945. Its personnel and equipment were transferred to the 50th Rifle Division.

== Commanders ==
- Major General Pyotr Ivanovich Lyapin (8 December 1942 – 5 March 1943)
- Major General Ilya Fyodorovich Dudarev (5 March 1943 – 8 March 1944)
- Colonel Stepan Makarovich Chyorny (8 March 1944 – 27 June 1945)

== Composition ==
- 4th Guards Airborne Regiment "Mukacheve"
- 5th Guards Airborne Regiment "Mukacheve"
- 6th Guards Airborne Regiment
- 7th Guards Airborne Regiment 'Uzhgorod"
- 3rd Guards Airborne Artillery Regiment
