= Front of the Reserve Armies =

- Фронт резервных армий
- Emblem of the Armed Forces of the Soviet Union
- Active: July 14, 1941 – July 25, 1941
- Country: Soviet Union
- Allegiance: Commander
- Type: Front
- Size: Union
- Part of: Armed Forces of the Soviet Union
- Engagements: Great Patriotic War: Battle of Smolensk (1941)

Commanders
- Notable commanders: Ivan Bogdanov

The Front of the Reserve Armies was an operational–strategic formation, one of the fronts of the Workers' and Peasants' Red Army of the Armed Forces of the Soviet Union, during the Great Patriotic War.

== History ==
It was created in the Western (Moscow) Strategic Direction by decision of the Supreme High Command Headquarters on July 14, 1941 with the task of organizing early defense on the Staraya Russa – Ostashkov – Bely – Istomino – Yelnya – Bryansk line (the line is about 750 kilometers long).

== Composition ==
The front included management and 6 reserve armies transferred from the Reserve of the Supreme High Command Headquarters. In the 1st echelon of the front, the following were deployed:

- 29th Army;
- 30th Army;
- 24th Army;
- 28th Army.

The 31st and 32nd Armies remained in reserve.

== Combat action ==
The main areas in the defense of the Front of the Reserve Armies were the Kalinin, Vyazma and Tula. On July 20, 1941, 14 divisions from the armies of the 1st echelon of the front were allocated for counter–attacks in the Smolensk region.

On July 25, 1941, the Front of the Reserve Armies was abolished, its troops became part of the Western and Reserve Fronts.

== Command staff ==
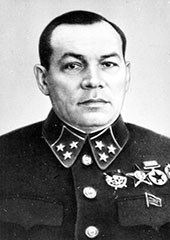
Ivan Bogdanov

- Commander – Lieutenant General Ivan Bogdanov.
- Members of the Military Council:
  - 3rd Rank State Security Commissioner Sergei Kruglov;
  - Secretary of the Smolensk Regional Committee of the All–Union Communist Party (Bolsheviks) Dmitry Popov.
- Chief of Staff – Major General Pyotr Lyapin.

== Sources ==
- Front of Reserve Armies // Great Patriotic War, 1941–1945: Encyclopedia / Edited By Mikhail Kozlov – Moscow: Soviet Encyclopedia, 1985 – Page 763 – 500,000 Copies
