= 144th Rifle Division =

144th Rifle Division (September 10, 1939 – July 25, 1956)
- Active: 1939–1956
- Country: Soviet Union
- Branch: Red Army (1939-46); Soviet Army (1946–56)
- Type: Infantry
- Size: Division
- Engagements: Operation Barbarossa; Battle of Smolensk (1941); Battle of Moscow; Mozhaysk-Vereya operation Battles of Rzhev; Smolensk operation Orsha offensives (1943); Operation Bagration; Vilnius offensive Kaunas offensive Gumbinnen-Goldap offensive Vistula–Oder offensive East Prussian offensive Samland offensive Soviet invasion of Manchuria; Harbin–Kirin Operation
- Decorations: Order of the Red Banner; Order of Suvorov; Order of Kutuzov; Order of Alexander Nevsky
- Battle honours: Vilnius

Commanders
- Notable commanders: Maj. Gen. Mikhail Andreevich Pronin; Col. Ivan Nikolaevich Pleshakov; Col. Fyodor Dmitrievich Yablokov; Col. Andrei Avvakumovich Kaplun; Col. Aleksandr Alekseevich Donets; Col. Nikolai Timofeevich Zorin

The 144th Rifle Division was formed as an infantry division of the Red Army in September 1939 in the Moscow Military District, based on the shtat (table of organization and equipment) of later that month. It remained in the same District until the beginning of the German invasion in June 1941, initially as part of 20th Army. It was railed to the front, significantly understrength, in the last days of June, rejoining its Army, and was almost immediately pocketed near Smolensk. It took part in a counterattack which briefly retook the town of Rudnya, but rapidly lost strength in this precarious position. In the first days of August the remnants of the division emerged from the pocket and took up defensive positions along the Dniepr River for rebuilding. During August and September it was involved in several abortive attempts to retake Dukhovshchina, and the associated losses put it in a poor state to resist when the German offensive on Moscow was renewed in the first days of October. Still holding near Smolensk it did not come under direct attack but was deeply encircled and had to withdraw over 100km without adequate communications or supplies and only several hundred men escaped. This was enough to allow another rebuilding in early November before it was assigned to 5th Army, where it served through the defense of Moscow. In the same Army it took part in the winter counteroffensive, during which it assisted in the liberation of Mozhaysk. It reached the vicinity of Gzhatsk as the offensive wound down and remained there through 1942, taking only a limited part in the fighting for the Rzhev salient. At the beginning of March 1943 the salient was evacuated and during the pursuit the 144th was one of the first units into Vyazma, before coming up against the Büffel-Stellung at the base of the salient that brought the front to a standstill. The division was soon transferred to 33rd Army, still in Western Front. Under this command it fought through the Smolensk region again during August and September before becoming involved in the long and frustrating battles around Vitebsk through the winter and early spring of 1943/44, after which it returned to 5th Army for the duration of the war. As part of 3rd Belorussian Front it took part in the summer offensive that destroyed Army Group Center, then advanced through Lithuania. In the course of this advance it won a battle honor as well as the Order of the Red Banner for crossing the Neman River near Kaunas, and several of its subunits also won honors. In October it took part in the abortive offensive near Goldap and Gumbinnen in East Prussia, gaining the Order of Suvorov in the process. The 144th helped lead the Army's renewed advance into East Prussia in January 1945, gaining further honors in the process, and while it was not involved directly in the battle for Königsberg it took part in clearing the Sambia Peninsula before loading aboard trains for Siberia and the far east. When the invasion of Manchuria began on August 9 the division played another leading role in the advance on Mudanjiang and the battle for that city, and in the process won its final distinctions. It had a lengthy career in the postwar Soviet Army, remaining in the far east facing China until July 1956 when it was disbanded.

== Formation ==
Kombrig Mikhail Andreevich Pronin was given command of the 144th on the day it began forming in Ivanovo Oblast of the Moscow Military District. He had previously led the 175th Rifle Regiment of the 1st Moscow Proletarian Rifle Division. His rank would be modernized to that of major general on June 4, 1940. At the start of the German invasion the division was still in Ivanovo Oblast, under 20th Army of the Reserve of the STAVKA High Command, in 61st Rifle Corps with 110th and 172nd Rifle Divisions. Its order of battle was as follows:

- 449th Rifle Regiment
- 612th Rifle Regiment
- 785th Rifle Regiment
- 308th Artillery Regiment
- 270th Antitank Battalion
- 158th Reconnaissance Company
- 226th Sapper Battalion (later 310th)
- 217th Signal Battalion (later 217th Signal Company)
- 205th Medical/Sanitation Battalion (later 50th)
- 86th Chemical Defense (Anti-gas) Company
- 155th Motor Transport Company (later 228th)
- 284th Field Bakery
- 193rd Divisional Veterinary Hospital
- 926th Field Postal Station
- 656th Field Office of the State Bank

As of July 1 the 144th was still in the Reserve, but now as part of the separate 20th Rifle Corps with the 160th Rifle Division. It was already moving west, where on July 2 it rejoined 20th Army as a separate division. The Army was now under command of Western Front. In a July 27 report by Lt. Gen. P. A. Kurochkin he described the state of some of his units as they arrived at the fighting front:

Army formations: 73rd RD, 5th MC, 57th TD, 229th RD, 144th RD, and a TD arrived in the army at considerably reduced strength... Army divisional strengths range from 4,000 to 6,500 men, and, to a considerable degree, these people were in rear service and supporting units... During this period [July 1 - 25] we received 1,600 reinforcements, while we needed 70.000 men and 9,000 horses.

The report further stated the Army's signal units had only 25-30 percent of their communications equipment and transport. On the same day the 144th rejoined the Army, it was struck by elements of German 4th Army.

=== Battle of Smolensk ===
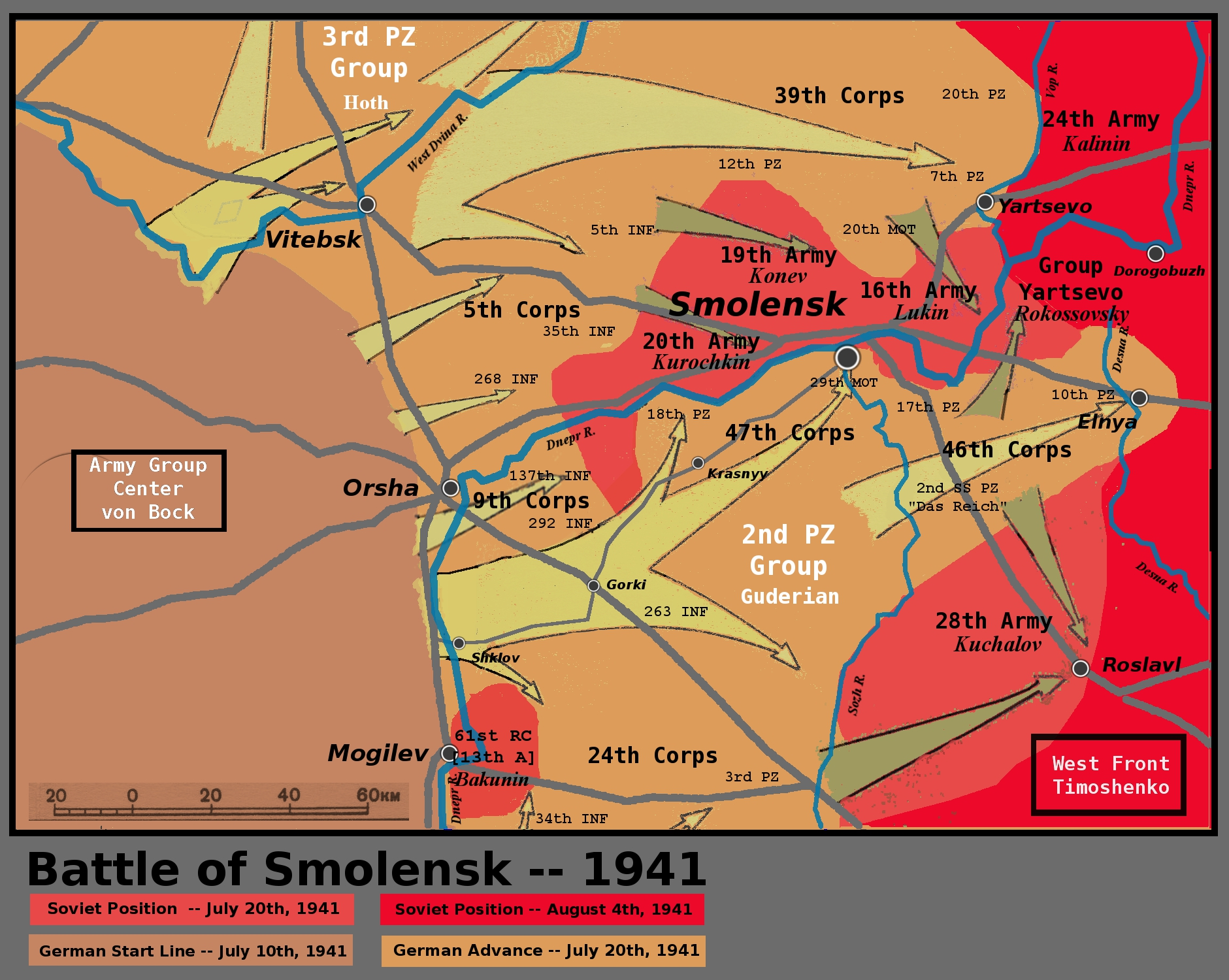
Map of the Battle of Smolensk 1941

20th Army was now part of the Group of Reserve Armies which had been assigned to Western Front and it had been ordered to prepare defenses along a sector on the approaches to Orsha. The Front was now under command of Marshal S. K. Timoshenko; he quickly assigned the 5th and 7th Mechanized Corps, with a total of over 1,500 tanks, to the support of the Army. At 0030 hours on July 5, as directed by Timoshenko, General Kurochkin ordered his Army to "prepare and conduct an attack against the flank and rear of the enemy grouping operating along the Polotsk axis." This counterblow effectively came to nothing apart heavy losses in tanks. By July 12 the 144th was attempting to hold crossings over the Dniepr River in the sector from Rossasna to Klimenki. Meanwhile Timoshenko was planning a massive counteroffensive scheduled to begin the next day in which 20th Army would destroy the German forces that had crossed the Dniepr near Astroŭna. Given the actual situation, no part of Timoshenko's plan was even remotely feasible. The next day the Marshal modified his directions to the Army; it was now to liquidate the penetrations in the Orsha and Shklow areas by the end of July 16 but this was no more realistic.

In heavy fighting on July 15 the 17th Panzer Division captured Orsha and, together with much of the rest of 2nd Panzer Group, drove the bulk of 20th and 19th Armies, including the 144th and up to 19 other divisions of various types, into an elongated pocket along and north of the Dniepr west of Smolensk. Despite this, Timoshenko was able to report on July 16 at 2000 hours that the division, now part of 69th Rifle Corps of 20th Army, had "seized Lyady from two companies of enemy infantry and 5-7 tanks" with an advanced battalion. In a further report two days later the stated, in part:

20th Army - fighting intensely with enemy panzer and mechanized forces but running short of ammunition, fuel and foodstuffs.
144th RD - attacking part of 12th PzD near Rudnya [65km west of Smolensk], but totally out of fuel.

Kurochkin was by now in command of all forces in the pocket and set about regrouping his units so as to keep in contact with Group Rokossovskii, which was holding open the line of communications to the east. Timoshenko's next report at 0800 hours on July 21 first asserted that Western Front's forces "continued to conduct sustained fighting with enemy units..." before specifically stating:

20th Army - concentrating along a new defensive line and counterattacking toward Rudnya.
144th RD - forced to abandon Rudnya at 2000 hours of 20 July by an enemy infantry division with artillery and tanks, with its right wing withdrawing to the Dvorishche and Batkovo line [20-25km northwest of Smolensk].

In a further report at 2000 hours on July 23, 20th Army was said to have regrouped to attack the German forces penetrating toward the city while also defending the north bank of the Dniepr, while the 144th had been hit by sustained ground and air attacks, after which it had withdrawn to a line from Molevo Boloto to Bolshaya Ploskaya Station by 1100 on July 22. It was at about this time that the 270th Antitank Battalion was removed from the division in order to help form a separate antitank regiment within the Army.

As the fighting continued Army Group Center was determined to disengage its panzer divisions to forestall further Red Army counterattacks from the east and to, hopefully, restore momentum to the drive on Moscow. Infantry corps had begun arriving in the area on July 18 and the panzers began moving on July 23, barely anticipating Timoshenko's new counteroffensive which would be led by 20 divisions of the Front of the Reserve Armies. It was crucial to the plan that the 16th, 19th, and 20th Armies in the pocket remain in the fight. Timoshenko directed that the 16th and 20th, both now under Kurochkin's overall command, retake Smolensk while also making local attacks on the perimeter to try to link up with the advancing groups of Reserve Front. The counterstroke began on a staggered fashion on July 23, with the full 20 divisions committed only two days later.

Timoshenko again reported to the STAVKA on July 24 in optimistic terms. 20th Army was said to be "repulsing attacks by up to 7 enemy divisions, defeated two German divisions, including 5th ID attacking toward Rudnya with three volleys of Katyushas..." At 2100 hours the next day Kurochkin stated that 20th Army was "defending and preventing an enemy penetration to Smolensk", and 69th Corps (now containing the 144th and 229th) was:

...taking over the Vydra, Debritsy, and Zybki sector from 153rd RD and 57th TD at 2400 hours on 25 July and occupying and defending the Vydra, Hill 213.7, Zybki, Rebiaki, and Kurino line by 0400 hours on 26 July, with a regiment in reserve in the Kholm region [20km northwest of Smolensk].

The headquarters of Western Front signaled at 0800 on July 26 that the 144th, 153rd, and 57th Tanks were engaged in day and night fighting with 5th Infantry. General Pronin received orders to withdraw his division into Army reserve overnight on July 26/27 to the Matyushino, Zamoshe, and Kozarevo area, 8-10km north-northeast of Smolensk, with the 153rd covering the move.

Despite these reports the pocket was shrinking, and by July 27 the counteroffensive was waning. The Front of the Reserve Armies was reorganized into Reserve Front on July 30, with Army Gen. G. K. Zhukov in command. On July 26 Kurochkin had prepared a strength return which stated the 144th had 30 artillery pieces remaining, roughly average for his Army's rifle divisions at that point. At the same time he recommended that his Army could prevent a German advance from north of the pocket with the 73rd, 153rd, and 144th while the remainder attacked the flank and rear of 7th Panzer Division at Dukhovshchina in an effort to keep the pocket open in cooperation with Group Rokossovskii.

As of August 1, 69th Corps had the 73rd, 144th and 233rd Rifle Divisions under command. 20th Army, however, was down to some 40,000 personnel, of which about one-third were "bayonets" (riflemen and sappers), facing double the number of German troops. In the previous days the 144th, 233rd and 1st Motorized had halted the 15th Infantry Division along the line they held. Despite the best efforts of 17th and 7th Panzers, Group Rokossovskii (now called Group Yartsevo) maintained a 10km-wide gap in the outer encirclement line from north of Ratchino on the Dniepr to Malinovka. It was now clear that 16th and 20th Armies would not survive unless reinforced or withdrawn. The pocket had shrunken in size to 20km east to west and 28km north to south and contained fewer than 100,000 men who were running out of all supplies.

Kurochkin ordered at 1930 hours on August 2 that 69th Corps (now the 144th and 153rd) was to defend the line of the Khmost River with part of its forces by 0400 on August 3 while also conducting a mobile defense along the Nadva and Orleya in an effort to reach the Dniepr crossings, then take up defenses along that river from Zabore to the mouth of the Ustrom by 0500 on August 4. Rear services were to precede this move. Kurochkin made clear to all his commanders:

You are personally responsible to the Motherland and government for taking all of your weapons with you during the withdrawal behind the Dniepr River...
During the crossings, give priority, first and foremost, to the wounded, to the artillery and tanks that lack ammunition and fuel, and to the army's rear services, and, later, to the army's troop formations and units.

The withdrawal began in earnest overnight on August 2/3, engaging outposts manned in company strength by forces of 20th Motorized Division. Those units that could not find the gap near Ratchino faced the riskier prospect of penetrating or infiltrating through this defensive cordon.

Timoshenko's operational summary of 2000 hours, August 3, stated in part that 20th and 16th Armies were "conducting rear guard actions" along the Khmost to the Dniepr at Malinovka and were being resupplied on the west bank of the latter. The retreating troops fended off pickets of 17th Panzer and were forced to run a gauntlet through the corridor, often under artillery fire and air strikes, fording the Dniepr wherever it was less than 60cm deep. The breakout lasted just over 48 hours, ending by dawn on August 5. 20th Army's forces were now ordered to pull back to the Dorogobuzh area for rest and refitting. At this time the 144th had just 440 "bayonets" remaining, although individuals and small groups would filter out of the pocket during the coming weeks. Rebuilding began immediately, still in 20th Army, and by August 15 the division had 559 officers, 626 NCOs, and 3,352 other ranks plus 1,000 new recruits. Armaments were as follow: 3,353 rifles; 46 sub-machine guns; 30 heavy machine guns; 53 light machine guns; one antiaircraft machine gun; one 45mm antitank gun plus four 12.7mm machine guns on the antitank role; three 76mm cannon; three 122mm howitzers; three 122mm cannon; five 50mm, 12 82mm, and two 120mm mortars.

=== Dukhovshchina Offensives ===
20th Army had come under command of Lt. Gen. M. F. Lukin on August 6. From August 9-15 the main forces of the Army were engaged in an offensive to tie down German forces on the west bank of the Dniepr. The 144th-

captured the Makeevo, Hill 165.9, and the woods to the south line from 9-12 August and approached Makeevo, Pnevo, and Mit'kovo, where it encountered heavy enemy resistance and dug in. Subsequent attempts to capture this line were unsuccessful.

At the end of this period the division was reported as being on a line from Korovniki to Osova, but still with two battalion-size detachments on the west bank of the Dniepr. Marshal Timoshenko was aiming to cut German communications between Dukhovshchina and Yelnya with 20th Army in support of 19th Army. At noon on August 15 he submitted a proposal to Stalin "to prevent the enemy from restoring order in his units, and also to destroy the enemy grouping in the Dukhovshchina region." 20th Army was to carry on its assigned missions while making preparations to exploit any gains made by 19th Army. The offensive was to begin on August 17. Lukin issued his orders at 1430 hours on August 16. The 144th was to defend the Dniepr from Solovevo south to a wood 2km east of Lagunovo, maintaining forward detachments at Makeevo, Pnevo, and Mitkovo, and also relieving the 153rd Division from the Dniepr bend to the wood overnight on August 17/18.

Western Front reported at 0800 hours on August 17 that "the offensive by 20th Army on the left wing is developing slowly against stubborn enemy resistance." At the same time it was still withdrawing artillery, vehicles, and equipment in small quantities across the Dniepr. At 1800 Timoshenko ordered Lukin to resume the attack, but this did not include the 144th, which was fortifying its scant holdings on the west bank. The orders for the next day again directed the division against Mitkovo. All this activity was a contingency to allow an advance on Dukhovshchina from the south in case of success by 19th Army. The 144th was reported as fighting with its forward units from south of Makeevo to a farm west of Marker 165.9 and to a ravine south of Mitkovo, with its main forces in combat on a sector from west of Korovniki to Marker 195.6, while taking "intense artillery fire from Makeevo, Pnevo, and Liakhovo." On August 19 the division made another attack which failed to take Mitkovo.

In an August 20 report on the fighting at Makeevo the 144th's opponent was identified as the 2nd SS Motorized Division Das Reich. This confrontation continued the following day. 20th Army was expected to attack again at 0900 hours on August 22 in an effort to reach the Khmost River, with the 144th now attacking Mitkovo again. At this point the 3rd Panzer Group was unleashed against 22nd Army on Western Front's right flank near Velikiye Luki, which would create a crisis forcing the end of the offensive on Dukhovshchina. 20th Army would attack again on August 23 with every intention of continuing on the next, although the division was now defending against German attacks from Solovevo. Its situation did not change on August 24.

The 144th was now to be transferred to 16th Army, which was given orders to go over to the defense until August 30; at this time the division was go on a general offensive with three other divisions. Prior to this shift, it remained in its previous positions with the 73rd Division, and on August 26 the 308th Artillery Regiment was said to have destroyed one machine gun emplacement and suppressed two German batteries near Skrushevo. The next day the two divisions continued to hold their ground, conduct reconnaissance, and exchange artillery fire. By August 28 the transfer was cancelled as Lukin was ordered to form a shock group of six divisions to begin a new offensive to envelop Smolensk from the south beginning on September 1. This was to kick off at 1000 hours, again with the initial objective of reaching the Khmost. The 144th would have the support of a battalion of the 592nd Gun Artillery Regiment, was first to take over part of the sector of the 153rd, and then:

... while attacking toward Skrushevo and Pnevo with one regiment to capture both points, attack toward Mit'kovo and Liakhovo with the remaining forces at 1000 hours on 1 September and capture the Mashkino and Fedurno line by day's end, while protecting the right flank of the army's shock group.

The Army's engineers were to construct two bridges over the Dniepr in the division's sector by 0300. Altogether the six divisions fielded some 25,000 men, but no tanks, while about 8,000 German troops defended.

When the offensive began 20th Army was facing the 8th Infantry Division of VIII Army Corps, while 2nd SS had been moved back to the reserve. At the outset the 144th ran into heavy fire from Pnevo and intense resistance at Lyakhovo which halted its advance and forced it to dig in 1,000m east of Skrushevo to 200m east of Pnevo and 1,000m northeast of Mitkovo and Lyakhovo. The next day the best the Army's shock group could do was to exchange fire and make minimal advances. For September 3 the division, less the 449th Rifle Regiment (protecting the Army's right flank), was to take Pnevo with two battalions, plus Mitkovo by attacking from the east and northeast with one regiment, and also prepare to attack Mashkino. During the day it, and the 153rd, pushed at Mitkovo repeatedly without success, which continued on September 4.

For September 6, Pronin received the following orders as the offensive ran down on this front:

144th RD (with one regiment from 153rd RD, 1st and 3rd Bns, 592nd [Gun Artillery Regiment], and two batteries of 872nd [Antitank Regiment] - after relieving 153rd RD by 0100 hours on 6 September, occupy defenses along the eastern bank of the Dnepr River from the mouth of the Vop' River to Ratchino, while paying special attention to defending the Solov'evo and Korovniki axis, and protect the army's boundary with 16th Army. Hold on to your positions on the Dnepr River's western bank with forward detachments occupying strongpoints and the high ground and fortify the gaps intervals between them with strong obstacles.

Overnight on September 7/8 the regiment of the 153rd was to be released so it could concentrate in the rear with the rest of its division. As of the beginning of September 9 the 144th was reported as defending between Buyanovo and Osova on the east bank of the Dniepr.

== Operation Typhoon ==
As the fighting shifted to other fronts later in September, and as Soviet mobilization hit its stride, the forces of Western Front were able to rebuild to the point that the average rifle division had 10,500 personnel on September 30, although this includes new divisions arriving from the east. At this time 20th Army, now under the leadership of Lt. Gen. F. A. Yershakov, had only four rifle divisions (229th, 73rd, 129th and 144th) under command.

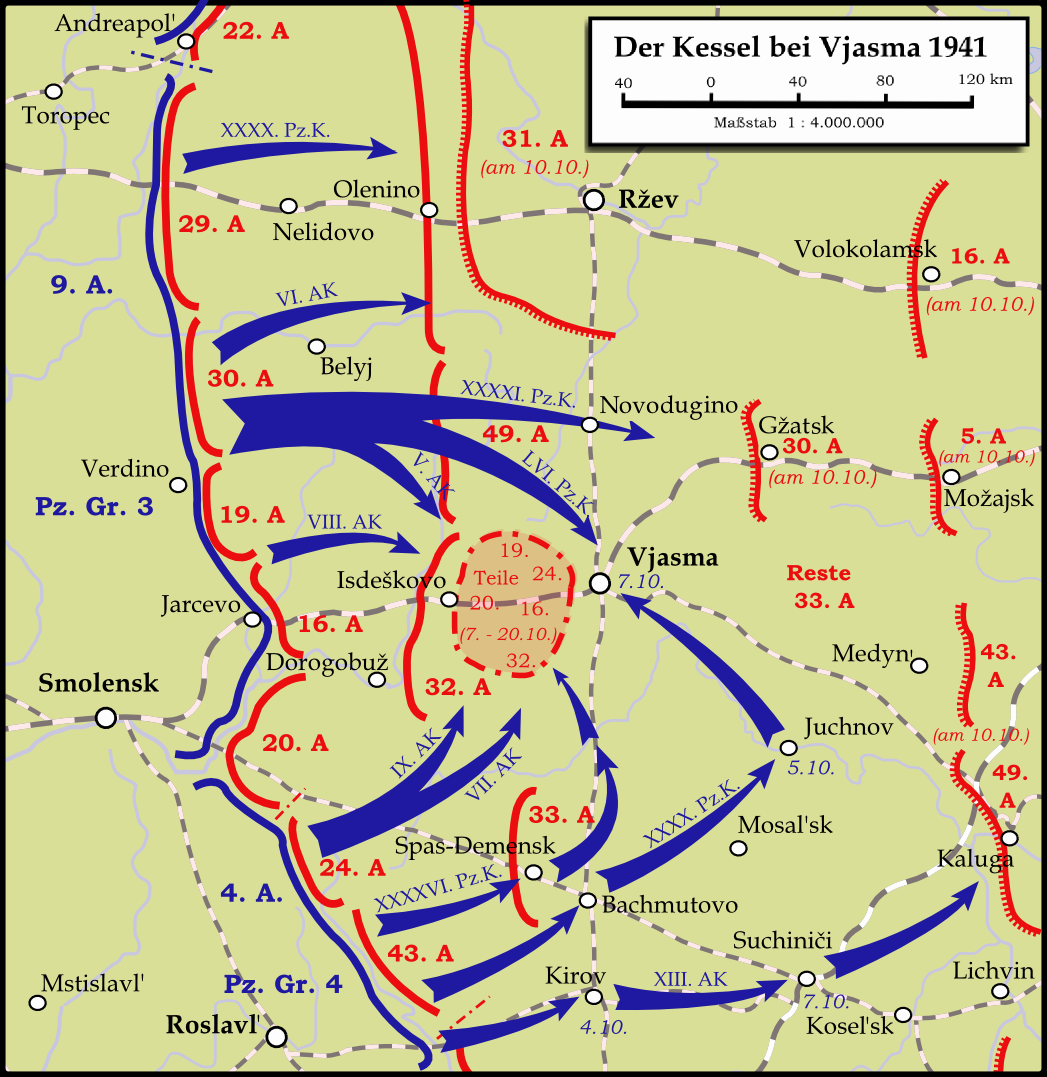
Operation Typhoon (northern sector). Note initial position of 20th Army.

The German offensive on Moscow began on this sector on October 2. The 144th and 73rd were still holding along the Dniepr while the 229th and 129th were echeloned to the southeast, facing elements of the XXVII and IX Army Corps. This placed the Army exactly midway between the thrusts of 3rd Panzer Group to the north and 4th Panzer Group to the south. By October 5 the Army's position was becoming increasingly precarious as the armored spearheads began to converge on Vyazma well to the rear. At 0750 hours the next day the new commander of Western Front, Col. Gen. I. S. Konev, sent out orders by radio for Western Front to commence a general retreat. By now the tips of the German pincers were separated by just 40-50km, while the 144th and 129th were 110-120km from Vyazma in a direct line.

With the transfer of 73rd and 229th Divisions to 16th Army, Yershakov now had the 144th and 129th, plus the 112th and 108th Rifle Divisions, under command. He was directed to withdraw the forces west of the Dniepr to the east bank and then both divisions along the Uzha River to Vederniki, and he set this in motion at 0500 hours on October 7, although it was utterly inadequate to the situation. The retreat was to be covered by separate regiments along three river lines, while he also kept a "strong reserve" on the left flank. For its part the 144th, with the attached 471st Rifle Regiment of the 73rd and the 302nd Howitzer Artillery Regiment, would travel through Korovniki, Mikhailovo, and Artyushkino. Once the withdrawal was complete the 129th would become the Army's reserve. Yershakov attempted to regulate the movement as best as possible:

... 8. All division commanders when planning the withdrawal must first anticipate the withdrawal of the artillery.
9. During the withdrawal of the covering units, all road structures, telephone and telegraph lines and similar objects... are to be destroyed.
10. Division and unit commanders are to arrange through local organs of authority and by administrative means the driving of cattle from the areas abandoned by the troops. All agricultural reserves from local resources, which cannot be evacuated, are to be destroyed.

For an army in contact with the enemy and about to be deeply encircled such directions were simply unrealistic. The new line of defense was designated as another section of the Dniepr some 50-55km to the rear. Konev failed to coordinate with Reserve Front to protect the junction of its 24th Army and his 20th.

Already at 1920 hours on October 6, Konev was adjusting his orders for the withdrawal, directing Yershakov to pull back overnight to a line from Grigorevo to Krasnoe. German forces detected the withdrawal and immediately set out to pursue, but were held up by rearguards, plus minefields near Yartsevo. However, 19th Army, which was farther east to begin with, pulled back at a faster pace leaving the 20th in a difficult position as German troops reached the Moscow–Minsk highway, which it was using, forcing it to shift to the south. The back roads and the old Smolensk highway were jammed with rear-area transport of 24th Army. However, the German pursuit lessened as XXVII Corps was more interested in pressing east along the highway. Far to the rear, on the morning of October 7 the panzer groups linked up just west of Vyazma, encircling four Soviet armies. At this time the 129th, 112th, and 144th were on a line from Chernovo to Usadishchi to Krasnoe to Kholmovaya.

According to Western Front's operational summary issued at 2000 hours on October 8 no report had been received from 20th Army during the day. Radio communications were intermittent throughout the Front, and a liaison officer sent to Yershakov had not returned. At 1745 several additional officers had been sent by U-2 aircraft with orders to speed up the withdrawal to Vyazma to take up a line from Shimonovo to Ugriumovo Station, 55km east of the city. In case German forces prevented this he was to fall back to a line south of Gzhatsk. That this would require moving at a pace of some 70km per day was overlooked, as was the fact that the encirclement had been completed. As desperation set in several headquarters began broadcasting in the clear; these messages were intercepted by German intelligence and gave away plans to break out in certain places.

Sometime between 1700 and 1900 the headquarters of 24th Army received an order from Yershakov that it was being subordinated to 20th Army in order to organize a breakout. His plan was to maintain an all-round defense as 20th Army broke out across a line from Vyazma to Volosta to Piatnitsa [20km in width]. By now discipline was breaking down, making any organized effort across such a wide front impossible. In addition, all three places were now firmly in German hands. General Zhukov now ordered all trapped forces: "In the course of 10 and 11 October, breach the enemy's line and at whatever cost escape the encirclement..." 20th and 24th Armies were to penetrate to the southeast, despite Konev's earlier orders to do so to the southwest. A radio link with Yershakov had been briefly established, over which he reported he planned to break out south of Vyazma.

By October 10 Army Group Center was becoming anxious to destroy the encircled armies so as to continue the advance on Moscow as the weather was already deteriorating. Over the next week individuals, small and larger groups managed to reach friendly lines. On October 18 General Pronin and a small cadre of the 144th escaped through the sector designated for 24th Army, near Dorokhovo, with the commander of that Army and some 460 of his troops following. Pronin still had enough of a cadre that the division escaped being disbanded. This cadre was rebuilt with the 25th and 185th Reserve Rifle Regiments. By the beginning of November the remnants had returned to the front, reassigned to 5th Army, still in Western Front. As the division recuperated its rifle regiments were temporarily redesignated, with a 438th from November 13 to November 23, a 457th from November 24 to December 20, and a 1310th from November 24 to December 23, after which all reverted to the original numbers.

== Battle of Moscow ==
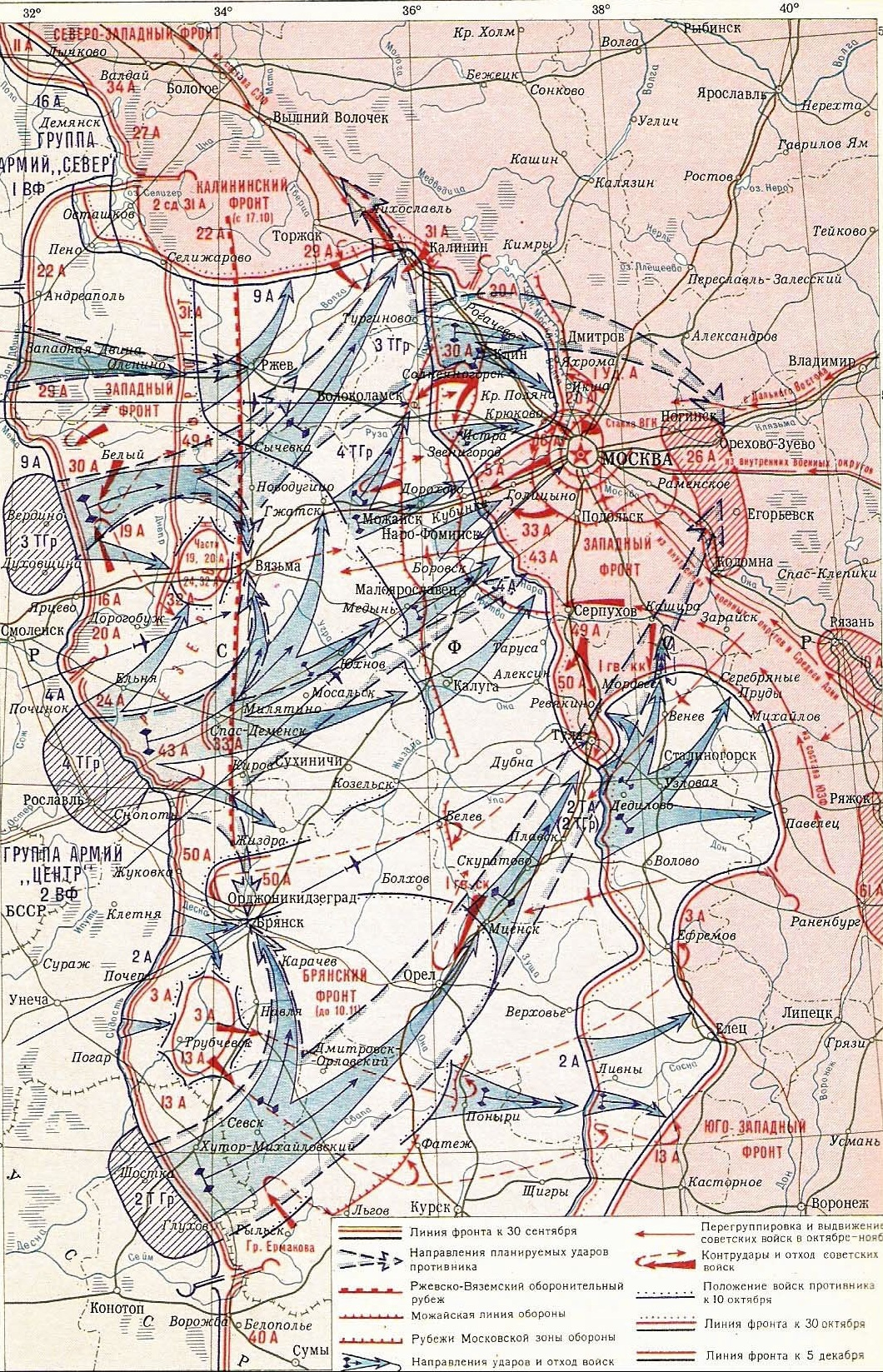
Battle of Moscow. Note position of 5th Army during late November and early December.

5th Army was under command of Lt. Gen. of Artillery L. A. Govorov, and as of November 16 was defending with part of his forces (the 144th, 32nd, and 50th Rifle Divisions, three tank brigades, 82nd Motorized Rifle Division, and 36th Motorcycle Regiment) on a line from Fomkino (17km northeast of Ruza) to Tuchkovo to Bolshye Semyonychi, with a division in reserve near Zvenigorod. This 50km-wide front bordered 33rd Army on the left at Kulakovo; the 144th was responsible for 20km of this. Govorov had roughly 31,000 personnel; 217 guns (76mm and larger); 85 antitank guns; 160 mortars (of all calibres); and 65 tanks. The STAVKA was expecting the German offensive to recommence at any time, and 30th Army had come under attack the previous day.

During November 16-17 5th Army continued the consolidation of its existing positions, receiving some artillery and mortar fire and minor ground attacks. This state of affairs continued through to November 18, as Govorov launched a series of pinning attacks. Over the next two days the 87th and 78th Infantry Divisions, aided by a few tanks, made a series of attacks of their own, taking Andreevskoe, Khaustovo, and Lokotnya, all within 15km of Zvenigorod. The Army's right flank fell back to a new defensive line Iglovo–Andriyankovo and farther south. This flank was fighting in close coordination with 16th Army as German units attempted to penetrate the boundary. The 5th was involved in very heavy fighting near Dyadenkovo (10km northwest of Zvenigorod), Sergievo, and Lokotnya and by the end of November 20 units of the 144th, 129th, and 50th had been pushed back, with the German divisions reaching a line from Toropenki to Dyadenkovo to Sergievo to Mikhailovskaya.

Given the seriousness of this situation the Western Front command moved up the 108th Division and 145th Tank Brigade to the line Kotovo–Boriskovo–Nasonovo. As well, a defensive line was organized for a pair of machine gun battalions. The most urgent object was to defend Istra; to this end the water level of the Istra River was raised 1-2m. The reinforcements fared poorly on November 21, being forced from four villages by the 87th Infantry before a counterattack retook part of Nasonovo. The remainder of 5th Army's units managed to consolidate and hold. On November 24 the 108th also gave ground just outside Istra, but regained its footing. From then until December 1 the positions of the main body the Army changed little as the German offensive concentrated on driving into Moscow from the northwest. During the first part of that day it was engaged again by the 87th and 78th and armor of 10th Panzer Division, again aiming for the boundary with 16th Army. The 108th and 144th, facing superior forces, were both forced from several strongpoints, and the 108th suffered heavy losses. The attack continued overnight in the direction of Aksinino, attempting to wedge in between the 144th and what remained of the 108th. By noon on December 2 up to a regiment of infantry with tanks took Savkovo, 9km northeast of Zvenigorod, and began advancing eastward. Pronin's men held their defensive line and defeated a German breakthrough group with the help of 20th Tank Brigade. By the end of the day the division was no longer under active attack.

Overnight, the right flank of 5th Army continued fighting stubborn holding actions along the front Anosino–Aksinino–Yagunino, all even closer to Zvenigorod, while also preparing for the upcoming counteroffensive. During the morning of December 3 5th Army launched an attack to assist the left flank of 16th Army, during which Anosino changed hands four times. Overall the situation was stalemated. Fighting continued the next day as the offensive ran out of steam and several infiltrating groups were liquidated. The 144th attacked to retake lost positions and gain better jumping-off positions. In a last gasp on December 4 the 87th and 252nd Infantry Divisions managed to push back units of the 108th and 144th and take Abushkovo and Pokrovskoe.

=== Counteroffensive to the Ruza ===
At dawn on December 5 the two Soviet divisions, supported by 40th Rifle Brigade, 20th Tank Brigade, and air support, went over to the attack and by day's end had retaken Gryazi, Zakharovo, Yurevo, Palitsy, and Abushkovo. German forces began to retreat from Padikovo and Pokrovskoe under cover of powerful artillery and mortar fire. The Red Army had now gained the initiative, and Army Group Center was left holding a huge bulge from the Moscow Sea to Dmitrov to Zvenigorod. By this time the strength of 5th Army had grown slightly to 35,000, and roughly the same proportion in artillery and armor. General Zhukov, now in command of Western Front, issued orders that called for 5th Army to defend initially as the Front's other armies on the right flank destroyed the German forces in the bulge.

5th Army joined the counteroffensive on December 10 and by the end of the next day the 144th, 108th, 19th and 329th Rifle Divisions had pierced the defenses of 252nd, 78th, 87th and 329th Infantry Divisions and reached the area of Lokotnya and Kolyubakovo. By now the German forces along the Nara River were near exhaustion and were vigorously digging into the frozen soil. On December 13 Western Front issued orders for a general offensive by the central sector armies (5th, 33rd, and 43rd). The primary objective was to pin the German forces to prevent them moving to the flanks, but the possibility of splitting the German front in half was a contingency. In previous days the right flank of 5th Army, in cooperation with 16th, was steadily moving to the west, forcing advanced German units to the rear and taking territory and equipment. Zhukov now reinforced Govorov with the 2nd Guards Cavalry Corps, giving it the task of operating in the German rear.

Five divisions of 5th Army, including the 144th, now intensified the counteroffensive with a series of quick blows against German strongpoints. Resistance was stubborn, based on defenses that had been prepared in the German rear. Anxious to avoid protracted fighting, late on December 13 the 2nd Guards Cavalry penetrated the German front between the 19th and 329th Divisions. During December 20-21 several divisions of 5th Army, aided by disorder caused by the cavalry, forced the Ruza River and retook Ruza itself. In fifteen days of fighting through deep snow the Army's right flank had made impressive gains but at considerable cost and now a new fortified line was found on the west bank of the Ruza. Strong counterattacks now forced the abandonment of several bridgeheads, as well as Ruza, and the counteroffensive had to be suspended.

=== Mozhaysk-Vereya Operation ===
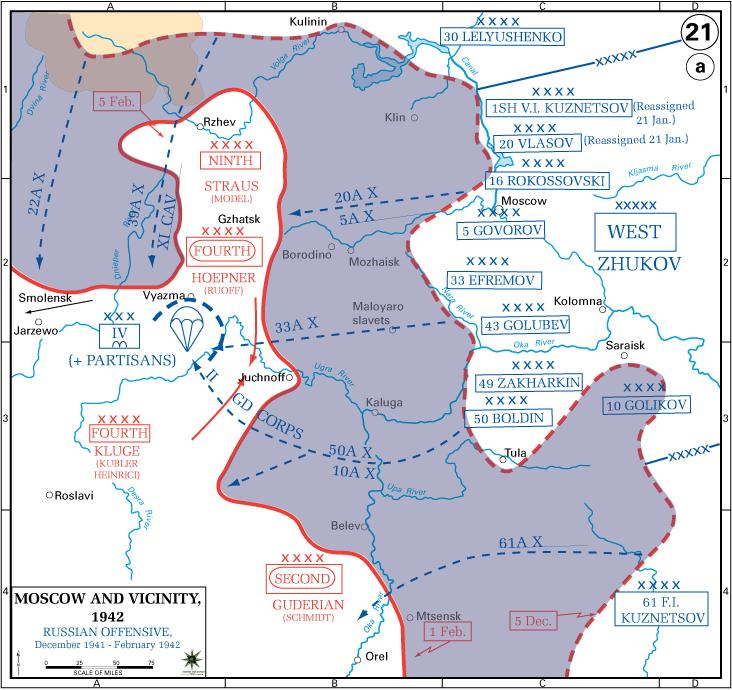
Moscow counteroffensive and formation of the Rzhev salient. Note advance of 5th Army.

The counteroffensive resumed on January 5, 1942, and on January 14 5th Army liberated Dorokhovo with its center and left wing forces. This, and the impending recapture of Ruza, opened the route to Mozhaysk, which had been turned into a major German stronghold. Zhukov now wrote a directive to the 5th and 33rd Armies:

The immediate objective of the center armies is to encircle and destroy the enemy's Mozhaysk-Gzhatsk group.
The objective: 1) the 5th Army, no later than January 16, is to capture Mozhaysk and then develop the blow toward Gzhatsk. The boundary on the left is the line Novo-Nikol'skoe–Yel'nya–Bol'shie Lomy.

Govorov, in turn, ordered his forces "to take Mozhaysk, enveloping it from the southeast and southwest." The axis of the main blow was to be on the left flank. The two Armies were facing the IX and VII Army Corps.

Following the capture of Dorokhovo the five center and left-flank divisions of the Army, including the 144th, continued their pursuit, reaching a line from Kostino to Zachate to Bugailovo on January 16. At the same time, 33rd Army reached Vereya. By the morning of the next day 5th Army's 50th Division had taken the village of Pervomaiskoe, the 82nd, 108th, and 32nd had made other gains, and German communications between Mozhaysk and Vereya had been cut. Overnight on January 16/17 Ruza had been abandoned, which freed up two rifle divisions and a tank brigade to join the attack on Mozhaysk, but completing its capture would be difficult until Vereya was taken, which finally happened early on January 19. By now the garrison of the former was in a serious situation. The 19th Division was battling for Natashino and other outskirt villages, trying to reach the line of the Moskva River; the 144th was fighting to reach a line from Prudnya to Pavlishchevo; the 108th was attempting to take Yazevo; and the 50th was consolidating along with the 20th Tank Brigade. By the morning of January 20 Mozhaysk was close to being completely encircled and the garrison began to pull out. The 82nd Division broke into the city at 1330 hours and quickly cleared it. 5th Army claimed 20 artillery pieces, 76 motor vehicles, three ammunition dumps and other stores. The defeated German forces retreated west toward Uvarovo, in part over the historic Borodino battlefield and set fire to the museum there. Uvarovo was taken on January 22, and the Mozhaysk operation came to an end.

By the third week of February the counteroffensive had run out of steam, but in spite of the facts on the ground the STAVKA demanded on March 20 that the push be renewed across the front, with 5th Army expected to take Gzhatsk by April 1. This failed, and under the terms of a STAVKA order of March 21 the 144th was to be withdrawn to Mozhaysk during April 25-30 for a brief rebuilding in the Reserve of the Supreme High Command, before returning to 5th Army. On June 24 General Pronin was moved to command of the 123rd Rifle Brigade, due to "blunders in defensive organization", and Col. Ivan Nikolaevich Pleshakov took over the 144th. Pronin would again be accused of misconduct, relieved of command and put on trial, but the case was dropped on November 20. He would go on to lead two other rifle divisions and the 65th Rifle Corps, and ended the war in command of the 16th Guards Rifle Division.

== Battles of Rzhev ==
The first Rzhev-Sychyovka offensive began on July 30 but did not immediately involve 5th Army. On August 5 the STAVKA directed its new commander, Lt. Gen. I. I. Fedyuninskii, to be prepared to attack on August 7 in order to link up with 20th Army at Sychyovka two days later. In the event the 20th did not get close to that objective, and 5th Army's attacks made few gains before going over to the defense on August 25, although isolated actions continued into late September. Despite its limited participation, from August 7 and September 15 the Army suffered 28,984 casualties while gaining 35-40km. On September 23 Colonel Pleshakov left the 144th, and was replaced by Col. Fyodor Dmitrievich Yablokov.

=== Operation Mars ===
A further offensive against German 9th Army in the Rzhev salient was being planned for November, and according to several documents, including a "Map-solution of the 33rd Army Commander for an offensive south of Gzhatsk" on November 14 that Army and the 5th would enter the offensive to "destroy the enemy's Gzhatsk grouping." This would be part of "Operation Jupiter", but was postponed until December 1 and never eventuated due to the failure of Mars.

=== Rzhev-Vyazma Offensive ===
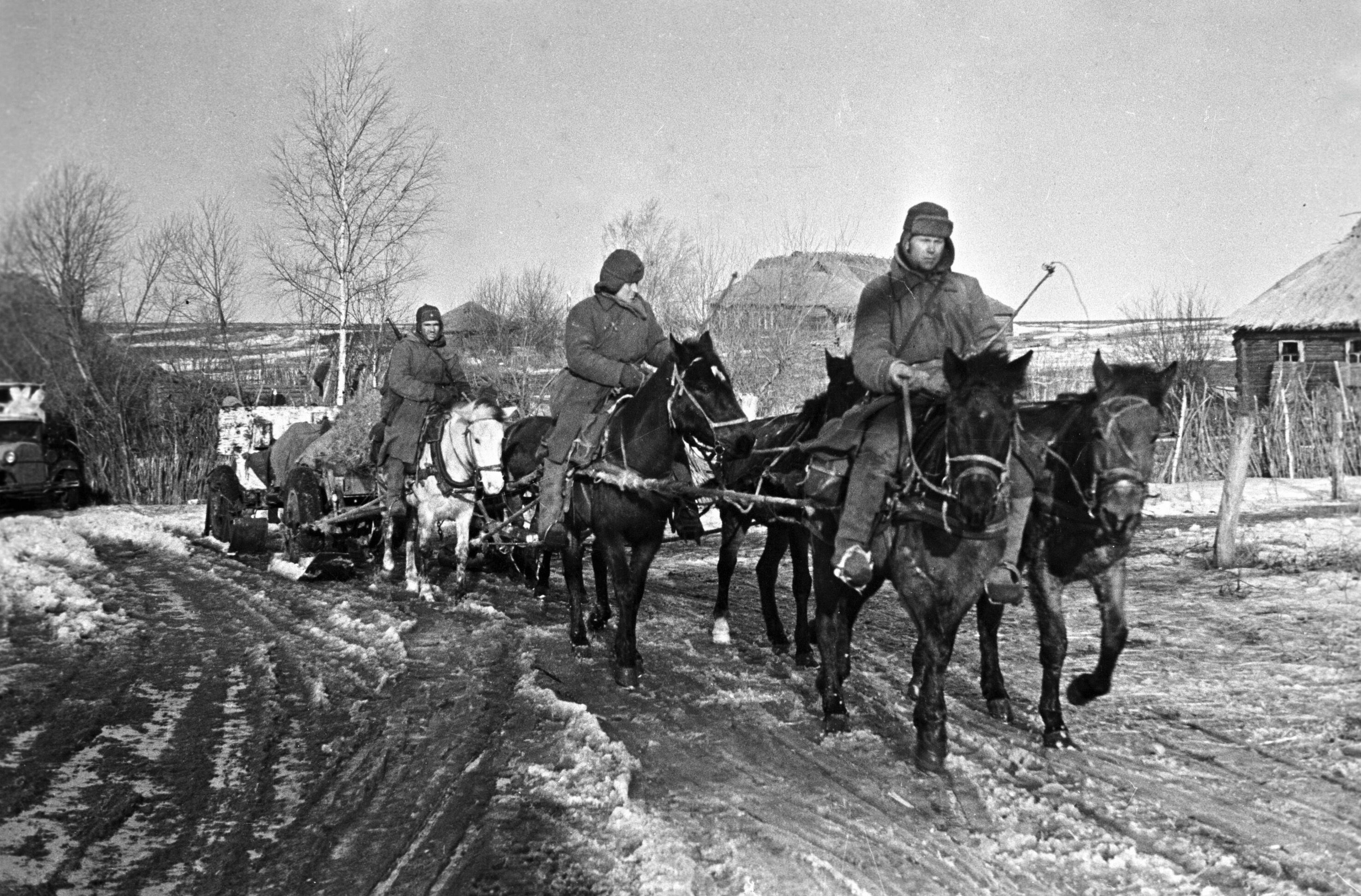
Gunners of the 144th with 76mm cannon and limber near Vyazma, March 1, 1943

By the beginning of February 1943 the 5th Army was a relatively weak force of four rifle divisions, although still strong in artillery. The strategic situation had changed significantly following the Soviet victory at Stalingrad and the subsequent exploitation on the southern half of the front. The current commander of Western Front, Col. Gen. I. S. Konev, was ordered to keep up pressure on Army Group Center to prevent its forces from being shifted to other sectors. 5th Army attacked with its 29th Guards Rifle and 352nd Rifle Divisions toward Gzhatsk on February 22 against 35th Infantry Division of German 4th Army and created a small breach in its front. An exploitation force of 153rd Tank Brigade and a ski brigade was committed which reached as far as Leskovo on February 26 before being encircled and largely destroyed. However, by now it was clear to the OKH that the Rzhev salient could no longer be held and, in fact, on February 6 Hitler had authorized a withdrawal that was to begin on March 1.

Operation Büffel started on schedule and 5th Army began its pursuit three days later using reconnaissance detachments formed from all its units probing along its entire front. Another mobile group was created from the 153rd Tanks, a ski battalion, plus the 70th and 40th Aerosan Battalions, which, along with the 153rd Rifle Brigade, finally took Gzhatsk on March 6. On March 12 a combined force of the 144th and the 3rd Guards Motorized Rifle Division, with 33rd Army's 110th Rifle Division, was first into Vyazma. Col. Gen. V. D. Sokolovskii, now commanding Western Front, ordered the pursuit to continue. According to the official history of 5th Army, "While pursuing the enemy, the 5th Army reached the Bykovo, Polibino, Teplianka, and Gorodok line by 23 March. Offensive action was halted along this line because of the spring rasputitsa. Both sides went over to the defense." While the weather played a role, extensive fortifications had been built across the base of the salient, and the withdrawal had freed up some 21 German divisions. By the beginning of April the 144th had been transferred to 33rd Army.

== Operation Suvorov ==
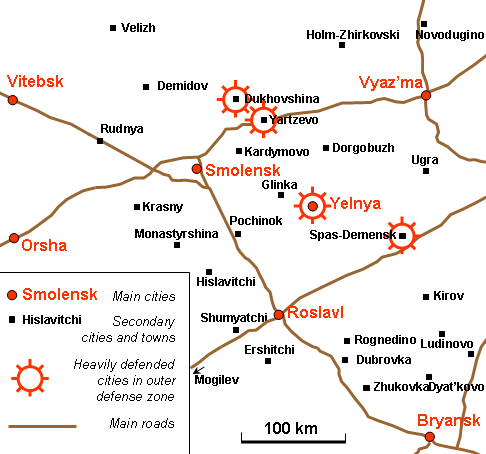
General layout of Smolensk region during the battle

The STAVKA chose to stand on the defensive in the Kursk region and absorb the attacks of 9th Army and 4th Panzer Army before going over to the counteroffensive. Western Front prepared for its own offensive in the direction of Smolensk and 33rd Army was substantially reinforced with armor and artillery by the beginning of August. Operation Suvorov began on August 7. 33rd Army was still facing the defenses of the Büffel-Stellung east of Spas-Demensk. At this time its divisions averaged 6,500 - 7,000 personnel each (70-75 percent of their authorized strength). Col. Gen. V. N. Gordov formed his main shock group from the 42nd, 164th and 160th Rifle Divisions and the 256th Tank Brigade but these ran into tough resistance from the 480th Grenadier Regiment of the 260th Infantry Division in the Kurkino sector. Only the 164th achieved a limited success, taking the village of Chotilovka at 2000 hours and threatening to drive a wedge between two German regiments. By early afternoon Sokolovskii was becoming frustrated about the inability of most his units to advance. The offensive resumed at 0730 hours on August 8 after a 30-minute artillery preparation, but with little more success.

Gordov continued attacking on August 9–10 with the shock group on a very narrow front but was stymied at Laski and Gubino; the intervention of an ersatz German battalion appears to have narrowly prevented a Soviet breakthrough. As both sides weakened the fighting continued into the morning of August 13 when the 42nd Division and the 256th Tanks were the first units of 33rd Army into Spas-Demensk. The 144th advanced into the void southwest of the town as German forces fell back to their next line of defense. Sokolovskii was forced to call a temporary halt on August 14 to replenish stocks, especially ammunition.

Sokolovskii's revised plan put his Front's main effort in the center with the 21st, 33rd, 68th and 10th Guards Armies attacking the German XII Army Corps all along its front until it shattered, then a push by mobile groups through the gaps to liberate Yelnya. Virtually all the units on both sides were now well below authorized strength and Suvorov was becoming an endurance contest. Ammunition and fuel were still short on the Soviet side given the competing demands of other fronts.

At 0800 hours on August 28 the Western Front began a 90-minute artillery preparation across a 25km-wide front southeast of Yelnya in the sectors of the 10th Guards, 21st and 33rd Armies. Instead of the obvious axis of advance straight up the railway to the city Sokolovskii decided to make his main effort in the 33rd Army sector near Novaya Berezovka. This assault struck the 20th Panzergrenadier Division directly, forcing it backward and away from its junction with the right flank of IX Army Corps. As soon as a gap was forced General Gordov committed the 5th Mechanized Corps at Koshelevo which began to shove wrecked German battlegroups out of its path. Overall the Army managed to advance as much as 8km during the day. On August 29 the 5th Mechanized completed its breakthrough and Gordov was able to add the 6th Guards Cavalry Corps to the exploitation force. By 1330 hours on August 30 it became clear to the German command that Yelnya could not be held and orders for its evacuation were issued within minutes; the city was in Red Army hands by 1900. From here it was only 75km to Smolensk. However, German 4th Army was able to establish a tenuous new front by September 3 and although Sokolovskii continued local attacks through the rest of the week his Front was again brought to a halt by logistical shortages. On September 2 a series of command changes began in the 144th as Colonel Yablokov left his command, being replaced on September 7 by Col. Andrei Avvakumovich Kaplun. This officer was in turn replaced on September 18 by Col. Ivan Fyodorovich Savinov, who was removed on October 7, but made deputy commander on October 18 under Kaplun, who had again taken command.

=== Liberation of Smolensk ===
The offensive was renewed at 0545 hours on September 15 with another 90-minute artillery preparation is support of the 68th, 10th Guards, 21st and 33rd Armies against the positions of IX Corps west of Yelnya. This Corps was attempting to hold a 40km-wide front with five decimated divisions. The 78th Assault Division buckled under the onslaught, but the Soviet armies gained 3km at the most, instead of a clear penetration. Nevertheless, at 1600 on September 16 the IX Corps was ordered to fall back to the next defense line. Sokolovskii now directed the 21st and 33rd Armies to pivot to the southwest to cut the Smolensk–Roslavl railway near Pochinok. On the morning of September 25 Smolensk was liberated. During the following days the 33rd Army pushed on toward Mogilev.

== Orsha Offensives ==
In late September the 144th had been assigned to 33rd Army's 65th Rifle Corps, along with the 58th Rifle Division. As of October 1 the Army was still facing the depleted 78th Assault and 252nd Infantry Divisions of IX Corps roughly halfway between the Sozh and Dniepr Rivers. For the new attack set for October 3 the 65th was initially deployed on the Army's left wing on the line of the Remistrianka River from Nikolskoe northward to Khodorovichy. Meanwhile the two German divisions had been reassigned to XX Army Corps, joining the 95th and 342nd Infantry Divisions. This provided a stronger defense than was faced by most of Western Front's armies, and the Army's assaults expired by October 9 without achieving any success.

Following a substantial regrouping which saw the Army moving north to positions near Lenino that had been occupied by 21st Army, Gordov deployed his 42nd and 290th Rifle and 1st Polish Infantry Divisions in first echelon, with 222nd and 164th Divisions in second echelon, to assault German positions across the Myareya River just north of Lenino. Three more divisions, including the 144th, plus 5th Mechanized and 6th Guards Cavalry, formed an exploitation force. The offensive began early on October 12 following an 85-minute artillery preparation which failed to take the defenders by surprise. In two days of fighting the Western Front armies were almost completely stymied; the Polish Division was able to carve out a wedge up to 3km deep west of Lenino at considerable cost, especially due to air attacks. When the offensive ended on October 18 it had cost the Poles nearly 3,000 casualties and 33rd Army's remaining divisions a further 1,700 personnel, although the 144th largely escaped the carnage as it was not actively engaged.

Sokolovskii planned for another offensive on Orsha to begin on November 14. Two shock groups were prepared, with the southern group consisting of elements of 5th and 33rd Armies south of the Dniepr on a 12km-wide sector. It would be supported with an artillery and air preparation of three-and-a-half hours duration as well as significant strength in armor. At this time the Front's rifle divisions averaged about 4,500 men each. 65th Rifle Corps was deployed between Volkolakovka and Rusany with the 144th in reserve. The 42nd and 222nd Divisions made limited progress in the direction of Guraki but the remainder of the Army's first echelon divisions faltered in the face of withering artillery and machine gun fire. The following day Gordov committed the 153rd and 164th Divisions in repeated attacks against the positions of 18th Panzergrenadier Division in Guraki, to no avail. Only by releasing the relatively fresh 144th to battle on November 17 was his Army able to secure a 10km-wide and 3-4km deep bridgehead on the west bank of the Rossasenka River by the end of the next day, at which point the offensive collapsed from exhaustion. The entire effort, which was most successful on 33rd Army's sector, cost Western Front's four attacking armies 38,756 casualties. In preparation for a fifth offensive on Orsha Gordov shifted additional forces into the Rossasenka bridgehead, and in the attack which began on November 30 his divisions, in cooperation with 5th Army, managed to force the defenders back roughly 4km before the lines stabilized. Sokolovskii ordered the Front over to the defense on December 5.

In the course of this fighting Cpt. Vladimir Alekseevich Saprykin distinguished himself sufficiently to be made a Hero of the Soviet Union. He was in command of the 2nd Battalion of the 612th Rifle Regiment near the village of Krasnaya Sloboda on December 1 where he and his men captured a line of German trenches on a hill. They were soon cut off from the regiment and held out for three days against tanks and infantry. With no orders to withdraw, only 30 soldiers remaining, and German troops just 20m away, he radioed for artillery fire to be directed on his own position. He was believed to have been killed, and was "posthumously" awarded the Gold Star on June 3, 1944. In fact, he had received a serious chest wound and had been taken prisoner while unconscious. He would recover in captivity, and was liberated by British forces in April 1945, with no idea of his award. He then considered that he had been encircled near Yelnya in October 1941, had managed to evade capture, but was then sent to a filtration camp and eventually sentenced to 10 years imprisonment and sent to a penal battalion. Being wounded after a month his sentence was commuted and he went back to regular service until his capture. Under the circumstances he chose to emigrate to Canada, where he worked in several jobs in Toronto. He attended university where he earned a degree in engineering and began working in quality control for Admiral appliances. Soviet authorities became aware that he was still living and in August 1977 his awards were revoked "due to error". He died in Toronto on April 24, 1990 and on December 4, 1991 his awards were restored. In July 1999 his remains were reburied in a mass grave near the site of his heroic stand.

=== Battles for Vitebsk ===
Shortly after this 33rd Army was directed to redeploy substantially to the north to reinforce the left wing of 1st Baltic Front as it attempted to encircle and liberate the city of Vitebsk. When the redeployment and regrouping were completed on December 22 the Army had 13 rifle divisions on strength, supported by one tank corps, four tank brigades, and ten tank and self-propelled artillery regiments, plus substantial artillery. The 144th and 164th had been reassigned to the re-created 69th Rifle Corps and were deployed east of Kovaleva with 2nd Guards Tank Brigade in support. The attack began the following day in cooperation with 39th Army. The shock groups forced the defenders back about 1,000 metres on the first day but the commitment of second echelon divisions on December 24 enlarged the penetration to a depth of 2-3km. Despite the arrival of a battlegroup of Feldherrnhalle Panzergrenadier Division on December 25 the entire 33rd Army burst forward from 2-7km, reaching to within 20km of Vitebsk's city center. 33rd Army suffered 33,500 personnel killed, wounded or missing, plus the loss of 34 mortars and 67 guns, in fighting that continued until January 6, 1944.

==== Third Vitebsk Offensive ====
The offensive was renewed on January 8. 36th Rifle Corps was the Army's main shock group while Gordov retained the 69th Corps, as his reserve. In the event 69th Corps was not committed. The attack made very little progress and the effort was suspended on January 14. By now the rifle divisions in 33rd Army numbered 2,500 to 3,500 men each, rifle regiments consisted of one or two battalions, battalions of one or two companies, and companies, 18 to 25 men each.

When the offensive was renewed again on February 3 the 69th Corps was part of the Army's shock group, assigned to continue the drive to encircle Vitebsk from the south, although now aiming for a far shallower envelopment. The Corps was deployed in the sector between Ugliane and Vaskova with the 144th and 222nd in first echelon and the 42nd Division behind, facing the 206th Infantry Division. The artillery preparation was again hindered by ammunition shortages but despite this the first echelon pierced the German forward defenses and pushed on 2km, capturing strongpoints at Novka, Bondary and Laputi. Gordov ordered his corps commanders to commit their second echelon divisions the next day, but the Luchesa River, only partly frozen and with deep, steep banks, proved a formidable obstacle. The 206th Infantry was reinforced by a battlegroup from the 246th Infantry and held the 69th Corps to meagre gains over the next three days of fighting, reaching north of Shapury but no farther. On February 5 Colonel Kaplun left the 144th and was replaced by Col. Aleksandr Alekseevich Donets, who had previously served as deputy commander and as chief of staff of 176th Rifle Division.

Sokolovskii and Gordov now desperately sought some weak spot in the defenses they could exploit and focused all their efforts on the Shapury sector which was their closest point to the center of Vitebsk. 69th Corps was assigned to a 4km-wide frontage from Ugliane to the Vitebsk–Orsha railway while 65th Corps took over its former sector. Five more days of heavy fighting began on February 8. The 222nd and 42nd Divisions drove a small wedge into the German lines along the railway only to again be halted by reinforcements from the 246th Infantry. The next day the 42nd and 144th Divisions, with additional tank support, pushed ahead another 2km before a battlegroup of 20th Panzer Division forced a halt. Again exhausted by heavy losses the Corps went over to the defense and while 65th and 81st Rifle Corps fought on for three more days all the assaults after February 13 proved futile. The STAVKA finally called a halt on February 16.

==== Fourth and Fifth Vitebsk Offensives ====
A renewed offensive was planned to begin on February 29 and in preparation the Corps was formed into a three-echelon formation to assault the German defenses from just north of Perevoz to Bukshtyny and force the Luchesa before advancing to Ostrovno. Before it could begin the commander of the 3rd Panzer Army, Col. Gen. G.-H. Reinhardt, disrupted the plan by shortening his defensive line around the city. The STAVKA took this as a preliminary to a full withdrawal from the Vitebsk salient, and ordered a pursuit. Almost immediately the 144th and the 199th Rifle Division of 65th Corps eliminated a German bridgehead over the Luchesa at Bukshtyny, and on March 1 the two divisions, with tank support forced their own crossing and created a bridgehead at Shuki. Gordov now concentrated his forces in an effort to enlarge this lodgement in hard fighting through the next two days. It soon became apparent that, instead of withdrawing, 3rd Panzer was preparing a defense that would guarantee another series of frontal assaults, and the offensive collapsed on March 5.

After several weeks for replenishment, and to wait for the spring rasputitsa to abate, Western Front prepared for yet another offensive against Vitebsk. By mid-March the 144th had returned to 65th Corps, again with the 164th Division. Sokolovskii returned to his strategy of mid-January, planning to expand the salient southeast of Vitebsk farther to the south, this time employing three rifle corps, not including the 65th, on a 12km-wide front, supported by two tank brigades. The 144th remained holding its positions near Perevoz on the west face of the salient. The assault began at dawn on March 21 and made gains of up to 4km by nightfall, but this proved to the extent of progress as German reserves arrived. Fighting continued until March 29 but by the 27th it was clear to both sides that the offensive had faltered. Furthermore, given losses of 20,630 men from March 21-30 there was nothing Sokolovskii could do to reinvigorate it. In the investigation that followed in April of the Front's operations over the winter it was reported that in several cases replacement troops had been committed to action prematurely:

During 33rd Army's operations from 3-16 February, 222nd, 164th, 144th, and 215th Rifle Divisions received 1,500 replacements each on the eve of the offensive and went over to the attack the next morning. The officer cadre, who arrived as replacements, took over their subunits in their jumping-off positions and, after several hours, led them in the offensive.
[In addition] During 33rd Army's offensive on 3 February, in a number of divisions, cooperation was not organized between the artillery and the infantry. Thus, for example, 144th Rifle Division attacked Pavliuchenko, and its supporting artillery conducted its fire west of Pavliuchenko.

In consequences of such failings and many more, on April 12 Sokolovskii was removed from Front command, joining Gordov, who had already been cashiered.

== Operation Bagration ==
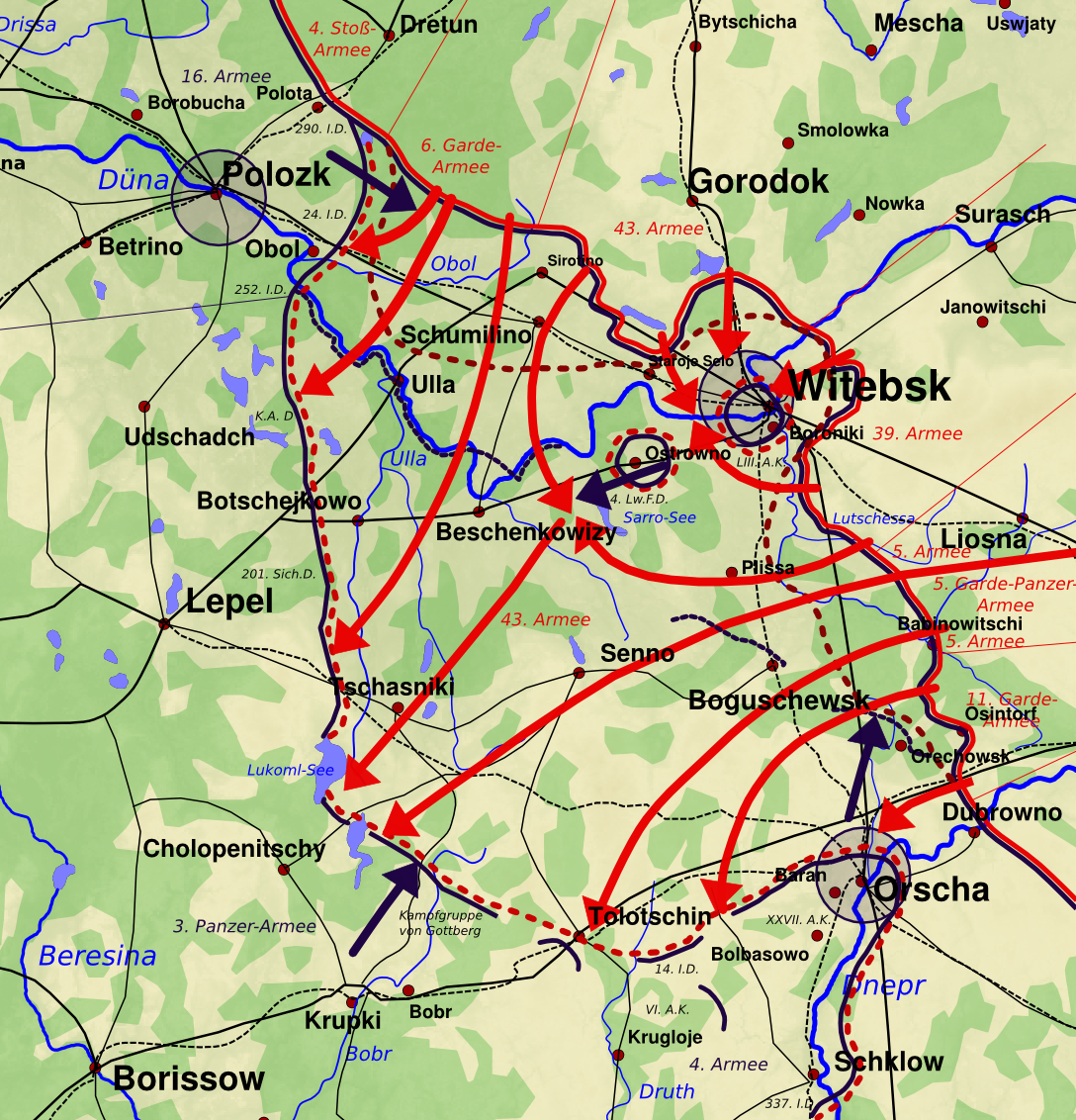
Vitebsk-Orsha Offensive. Note position of 5th Army.

In April the 144th, along with the rest of 65th Corps, returned to 5th Army, where it would remain well into the postwar. At the start of Operation Bagration the Corps consisted of the 97th, 144th, and 371st Divisions. The immediate objective of 5th Army was to encircle the forces of 3rd Panzer Army in Vitebsk from the south. The main attack on June 22 was preceded by a two-hour-and-twenty-minute artillery and air bombardment against the German 256th and 299th Infantry Divisions; when the attack went in the division was in the second echelon. This first echelon had the 2nd Guards Tank Brigade, plus the 395th Guards Heavy (ISU-152s) and the 343rd Guards (ISU-122s) Self-Propelled Artillery Regiments in support. Altogether the 65th and 72nd Rifle Corps hammered 18km of the German line on the Chernitsa River. 65th Corps faced two regiments of the 299th Division, and by the afternoon the 371st, flanked by the 97th, had gained 2.5km, driving through the center of the German VI Army Corps' position and reaching the second zone of defense. By day's end they had advanced as much as 4km and established bridgeheads across the Sukhodrovka River, which was bridged overnight.

The advance continued the next day, assisted by heavy artillery and air attacks. By 1300 hours, despite the arrival of German reinforcements, elements of 5th Army had crossed the rail line to Orsha. On June 24 the 371st and the 97th Divisions continued their attack and broke through the third German position, advancing a further 10km with 2nd Guards Tanks reinforced by the 144th. VI Corps was completely broken this day, with part of its remnants falling back to Bahushewsk, although that town was cleared by noon the next day in a combined arms action by 2nd Guards Tanks, the 144th and the 215th Divisions; during the day 5th Army advanced another 20km. Overnight on June 25/26 the Vitebsk salient was finally encircled, and the first Soviet troops crossed the Dvina and entered the city. By this time the 65th Corps was advancing well to the west in the direction of Chereya, with the 144th forming one of two forward detachments in the wake of Oslikovskii's Cavalry-Mechanized Group. By the morning of June 30 the advanced detachment of 65th Corps was across the Berezina River north of Barysaw and was pushing west without opposition. At this point the first phase of the offensive on this part of the front was suspended as the slower elements needed time to catch up.

=== Minsk Offensive ===
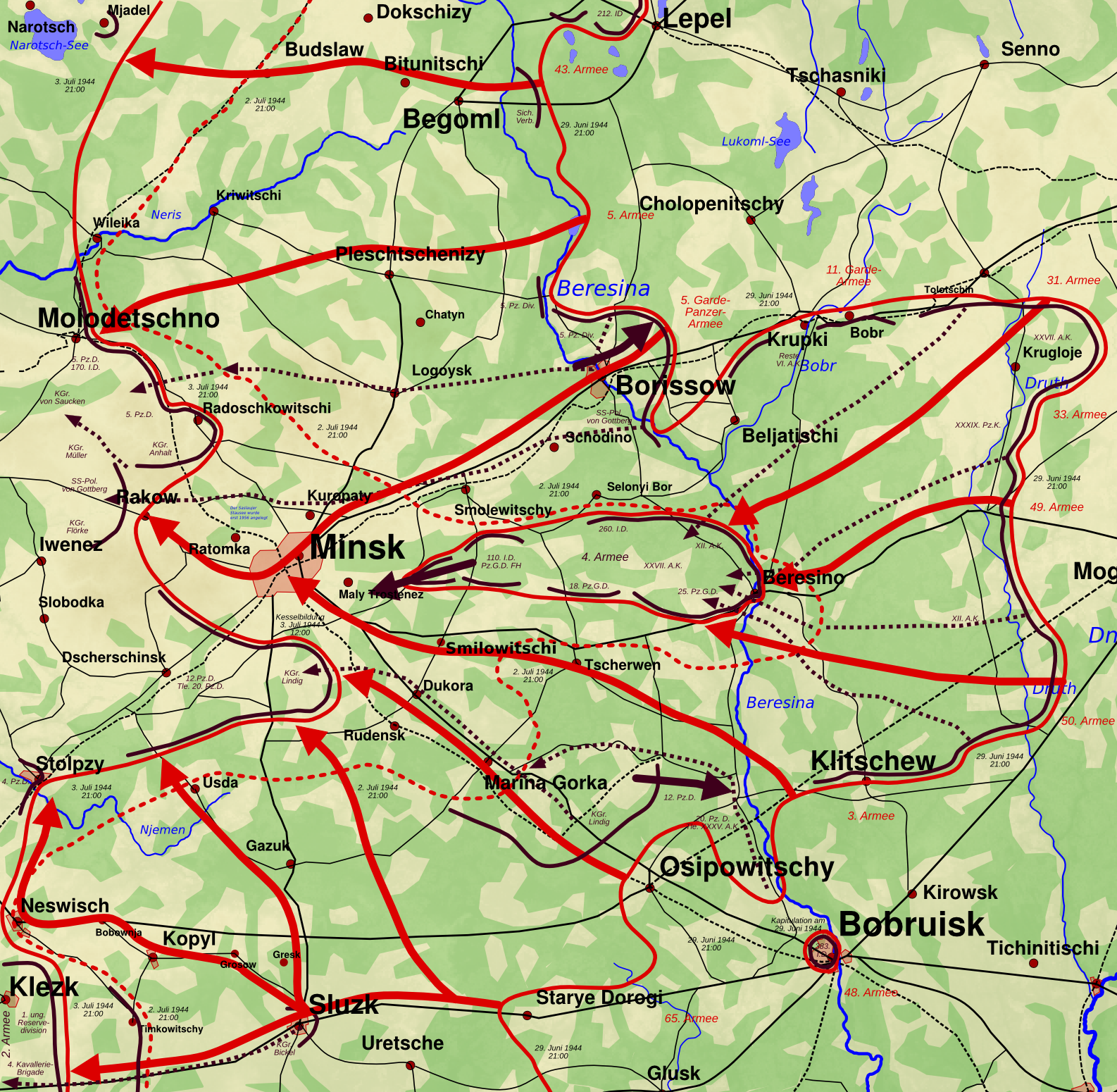
Minsk Offensive

During July 1 the 65th and 72nd Corps advanced roughly 10-14km. Minsk was largely liberated on July 3 as the 144th advanced with its Corps on the Maladzyechna axis. By July 6 the 5th Army had reached and forced the Viliya River from the march and ran up against the proposed German "East Wall" along the west bank of the Ashmyanka River. With few troops to defend it the position was soon overcome by the 3rd Guards Mechanized Corps, in close coordination with 65th Rifle Corps, in the Soly area along the Smarhonʹ–Vilnius railway and overnight the pursuit continued in the direction of the latter place. On July 8 the 65th, 72nd and 3rd Guards Mechanized Corps were all engaged in street fighting for the city. The elements of 5th Guards Tank Army involved turned their sector over to the 144th and moved out of the city at 1400 hours on July 9. The German garrison was completely isolated on July 10 and broken into two groups by the 65th and 3rd Guards Corps. In a desperate effort to rescue the garrison 600 men of the 2nd Parachute Division were dropped west of Vilnius but most of these were quickly defeated and rounded up. As a result of this fighting the division received a battle honor:

VILNIUS... 144th Rifle Division (Col. Donets, Aleksandr Alekseevich)... The troops who participated in the liberation of Vilnius, by the order of the Supreme High Command of 13 July 1944, and a commendation in Moscow, are given a salute of 24 artillery salvoes from 324 guns.

=== Kaunas Offensive ===
Division commander Colonel Donets at his command post during the fighting for Kaunas, 31 July 1944

Even as the battle for Vilnius went on the center and left wing forces of 3rd Belorussian Front advanced toward the Neman River and the border of East Prussia during July 9-13. German reserves began arriving to help 3rd Panzer Army mount a defense of Kaunas and the river line. South of this German 4th Army was responsible for the upper Neman and Grodno. By July 14 the Front began organizing operations to cross the river, beginning with elements of 11th Guards Army the same day. Units of 5th Army arrived and also began preparing. During July 15 the two Armies managed to seize a bridgehead 29km long and 2-6km deep. Grodno was cleared on July 16. The battle to expand the bridgehead continued through July 18-20, while units of 5th Army and 39th Army attacked in the direction of Kaunas with limited success. On the 20th, with the bridgehead now some 110km wide, the STAVKA ordered the Front to go over to a temporary defense while organizing the battle for the city. On August 12 the 144th would be awarded the Order of the Red Banner for its success in forcing the Neman during July 24-26, and two men were posthumously made Heroes of the Soviet Union.

Under STAVKA Directive No. 220160 of July 28 the commander of the Front, Army Gen. I. D. Chernyakhovskii, was ordered to capture Kaunas with 5th and 39th Armies no later than August 1-2 with converging attacks from north and south, and then to advance to the East Prussian border by August 10 to prepare to invade German territory. The general offensive by 5th, 33rd, and 11th Guards began at 0840 hours on July 29 after a 40-minute artillery preparation and air strikes, and by day's end the German defense had been penetrated up to 15km. 5th Army's left flank, with 33rd Army, advanced 5-7km out of the bridgehead. During the next day resistance along the Neman was crushed and the Front began a rapid advance on Vilkaviškis. This threatened the Kaunas garrison with encirclement and by dusk the 65th and 72nd Corps were on the near approaches to the city, coming up against stiff resistance from the Werthern Motorized Brigade. Overnight, 65th Corps broke into the city and, after breaking resistance based on the old fortifications, cleared most of it by 1900 on July 31, completing the job by 0700 on August 1. On the same day the 449th Rifle Regiment (Lt. Col. Baykov, Aleksander Ivanovich) received "Kaunas" and a battle honor, while the 612th Regiment received "Neman, and on August 12 the 785th Regiment was decorated with the Order of the Red Banner.

In mid-October the 5th and 11th Guards Armies led the rest of 3rd Belorussian Front in the abortive Goldap-Gumbinnen operation into East Prussia. Colonel Donets was promoted to the rank of major general on November 2. On November 14 the 144th was awarded the Order of Suvorov, 2nd Degree, for its part in this offensive.

== East Prussian Offensives ==
At the beginning of the new year the 65th Corps had the 144th, 97th, 371st, and 157th Rifle Divisions under command, but the 157th soon rejoined 45th Corps. At the start of the Vistula-Oder offensive on January 12, 5th Army was tasked with a vigorous attack in the direction of Mallwischken and Gross Skeisgirren, with the immediate task of breaking through the defense, then encircling and destroying the Tilsit group of forces in conjunction with the 39th Army. Progress proved slower than expected, with the German forces putting up fierce resistance. On the morning of January 14, 5th Army broke through the enemy's fourth trench line, and began to speed up the advance until the early afternoon, when heavy German counterattacks began. The 144th and 97th faced tank and infantry attacks from the 5th Panzer Division, which slowed, but did not halt, the advance. This sped up considerably on January 17 as 2nd Guards Tank Corps took up the running. 45th and 65th Corps had taken and consolidated the strongpoint of Radschen before advancing to a line from Mingschtimmen to Korellen, throwing the defenders out of the main positions of their Gumbinnen defense line. The last German reserves, including the 10th Motorized Brigade of nine assault gun companies, struck the boundary of the 45th and 72nd Corps before a fighting withdrawal to the west began.

Despite these breakthroughs a core group of German forces continued to hold out against 5th and 28th Armies in the Gumbinnen–Insterburg area. The new commander of 5th Army, Col. Gen. N. I. Krylov, moved part of his 72nd Corps forces northward to attack in the Girren area, but this did not prove effective. 45th Corps joined this effort and advanced slowly with the 72nd and by 2100 hours the joint force had taken the defense line along the Tilsit–Gumbinnen paved road, moving up to the line Kraupischken–Neudorf–Antballen. Meanwhile, 65th Corps struck the main Gumbinnen defense zone, taking the first line of trenches and closing on the strongpoint at Rudstannen. 5th Army was ordered early on January 20 to push on to reach the Angerapp and Pissa Rivers with its main forces by the end of the day. On January 21, the Army was directed to encircle and destroy the German grouping defending Insterburg in conjunction with 11th Guards Army on the following day; 65th Corps was to attack towards Didlakken. By 0600 hours on January 22 Insterburg had been completely cleared. During the following week the Army continued to attack in the direction of Zinten. On February 19 the 144th would receive the Order of Kutuzov, 2nd Degree, for breaking the East Prussian defenses. On the same date the 449th Rifle Regiment was decorated with the Order of Suvorov, 3rd Degree, and the 308th Artillery Regiment won the Order of Alexander Nevsky, both for their parts in taking Insterburg.

On January 27, 45th Corps, attacking along the Army's right flank, reached the area of Uderwangen and turned to the southwest toward Preußisch Eylau, with 72nd Corps following. By this time most German forces in East Prussia were falling back toward Königsberg and its fortifications. The following morning the 45th was unexpectedly counterattacked by elements of XXVI Army Corps coming from the south. The German force included up to 35 tanks and assault guns, but was thrown back with losses. Krylov exploited this success by committing 72nd Corps from behind the right flank toward Kreuzburg. On January 28 General Donets was seriously wounded and hospitalized. He would be released from hospital in December and served in various administrative posts until his retirement on March 3, 1960. He was replaced by Col. Grigorii Fyodorovich Perepich. The next day the 65th Corps turned its sector north of Friedland over to 28th Army and was moved to the left flank of 45th Corps before also beginning an attack to the south. The German forces continued to resist along the Heilsberg fortified line, and it was not until February 7 that 5th Army's forces were able to secure Kreuzburg. Colonel Perepich left the 144th on February 22 and was replaced by Col. Nikolai Timofeevich Zorin. This officer had previously served as deputy commander of the 215th Rifle Division and briefly as commander of the 63rd Rifle Division. He would remain in command for the duration of the war.

=== Samland Offensive ===
By the start of April the Soviet forces had been significantly regrouped. 5th Army was holding a sector from Spallwitten to Reessen, southwest of Königsberg. The Army was not part of the Zemland Group of Forces and was therefore not tasked with taking part in the assault on the city, which was set to begin on April 6. Instead, it would take part in the mopping up of the German forces isolated in the Sambia Peninsula, which began on April 13. The 5th and 39th Armies were assigned to make the main attack in the direction of Fischhausen, which would split XXVIII Army Corps in half east to west. Following this, the northern and southern pockets would be defeated in detail, with the assistance of 43rd and 2nd Guards Armies. The attack began with an hour-long artillery preparation before the infantry advanced at 0800 hours. 5th Army, on the right flank, moved on Norgau and Rotenen, advanced 5km, and took more than 1,000 prisoners. A further 3km were gained the next day against stubborn resistance. By April 17 the entire peninsula had been cleared, and 5th Army was already being pulled out of the fighting. While it moved back to the nearest railheads, the Army was assigned to the Reserve of the Supreme High Command on April 19 as it entrained for the far east.

== Soviet invasion of Manchuria ==
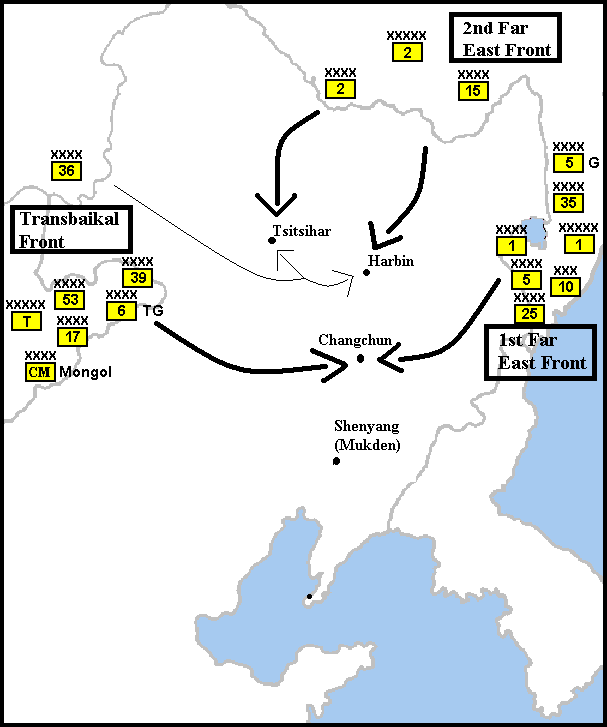
Invasion of Manchuria. Note route of 5th Army.

By the end of June the 144th, with the rest of 65th Corps, was in the Maritime Group of the Far Eastern Front, which became the 1st Far Eastern Front at the beginning of August. When the offensive began on August 9 the 5th Army was tasked with making the Front's main attack against one regiment of the Japanese 124th Infantry Division holding the Kuanyuehtai stronghold, with 65th Corps on the right flank. Special assault and reconnaissance detachments led at 0100 hours, disrupting the forward defenses in four hours of fighting. The first echelon regiments, backed by tanks and self-propelled guns, followed at 0830. By 1500 65th Corps had enveloped the northern part of Kuanyuehtai, and left cut-off Japanese units in the rear to be dealt with by the second echelon as it advanced to the northwest toward Machiacho Station, led by a tank brigade. By day's end the Army had torn a gap 35km wide in the Japanese lines and had advanced anything from 16-22km into the Japanese rear. Three of the Army's corps advanced deep into Japanese-held territory against the retreating 124th Infantry.

On August 11 advance elements of 65th and 72nd Corps reached the Muleng River, which had been planned for the eighth day. Mudanjiang was the next objective and Krylov formed a forward detachment of the 76th Tank Brigade, a self-propelled artillery regiment and two rifle battalions in an effort to take the place from the march. This was hit by heavy counterattacks by 135th Infantry Division on August 12 east of Taimakou, but the 144th and 97th arrived to reinforce. Following a 30-minute artillery preparation the combined Soviet force cut a swath some 4km deep through the Japanese positions and continued toward Mudanjiang.

During this advance Sen. Lt. Erenzen Lidzhievich Badmaev led his company of the 785th Regiment as tank riders. He and his troops had already defeated Japanese forces on Camel Heights north of Suifenhe on August 9, capturing two artillery pieces, five machine guns, and considerable other equipment. Badmaev would be seriously wounded in the fighting for Mudanjiang, but refused evacuation until the fighting finished. In recognition of his leadership he was nominated to be made a Hero of the Soviet Union in September, but probably due to his Kalmyk nationality this was reduced to the Order of the Red Banner. In the late 1980s the Soviet government was petitioned to have Badmaev re-nominated, and on May 5, 1990 he received the Gold Star and the Order of Lenin two years before his death at Elista on August 7, 1992.

The advance continued the next day, with the 144th and 63rd Divisions, each with a tank brigade as a vanguard, covering 30km along a 5-7km-wide corridor along the road and railway to Mudanjiang. Battered units of the 124th Infantry withdrew into the hills north of the highway, eventually surrendering on August 22 at Ningen, while the 135th and 126th Infantry Divisions pulled back to the city to create a defensive perimeter. As 5th Army units arrived at dusk the stage was set for one of the few large scale set-piece battles of the campaign, which would also involve elements of 1st Red Banner Army coming from the north. Mudanjiang was taken after a two-day battle on August 15-16, following which 5th Army pushed southwestward towards Ning'an, Tunghua and Kirin. On August 18 the Japanese capitulation was announced, and the Army deployed to accept and process the surrendering units.

== Postwar ==
In a final round of awards on September 19 the division as a whole received the Order of Alexander Nevsky, while the 612th Rifle Regiment got the same, the 308th Artillery Regiment was given the Order of the Red Banner, and the 785th Rifle Regiment won the Order of Kutuzov, 3rd Degree. By now the men and women of the division shared the full title of 144th Rifle, Vilnius, Order of the Red Banner, Orders of Suvorov, Kutuzov, and Alexander Nevsky Division. (Russian: 144-я стрелковая Виленская Краснознамённая орденов Суворова, Кутузова, Александра Невского дивизия.) 5th Army and 65th Corps remained in the far east in peacetime, and Colonel Zorin remained in command of the division until October 6, 1947, after which he attended the Frunze Military Academy and then served in the educational establishment. Col. Leonid Vasilevich Yakovlev took over in February 1948, remaining in this position until October 1951; he had led the 97th Division until it was disbanded.

As of March 1, 1953, 65th Corps had been transferred to 25th Army, still in the Primorsky Military District; it now consisted of the 63rd and 144th Rifle and 10th Mechanized Division. Early in 1955 the 144th was back in 5th Army, headquartered at Spassk-Dalny, with its rifle regiments now numbered as the 449th, 55th, and 93rd. By October 1 of that year it was back, with 65th Corps, in 25th Army. It was disbanded on July 25, 1956.
