= Vladimir Saprykin =

Soviet Red Army captain (1916–1990)

- Влади́мир Алексе́евич Сапры́кин
- Born: 24 August 1916; Sukhodol, Lebedyansky Uyezd, Tambov Governorate, Russian Empire
- Died: 24 April 1990 (aged 73); Toronto, Ontario, Canada
- Military career
- Allegiance: Soviet Union
- Branch: Red Army
- Service years: 1939–1945
- Rank: Captain
- Unit: 144th Rifle Division
- Conflicts: World War II; Battle of Moscow; Orsha Offensive
- Awards: Hero of the Soviet Union

Vladimir Alexeyevich Saprykin (Russian: Влади́мир Алексе́евич Сапры́кин; 24 August 1916 – 24 April 1990) was a Red Army captain and a Hero of the Soviet Union. Saprykin became a Red Army officer and was a regimental assistant chief of staff when he was caught in the Spas-Demensk pocket in October 1941. Saprykin escaped and reached Soviet lines. He was sent to an NKVD filtration camp, where it was decided that Saprykin had committed treason. He was sent to a penal battalion, where he was wounded. Saprykin became a company commander, regimental chief of staff, and battalion commander in the 144th Rifle Division.

During December 1943 in battles in eastern Belarus, Saprykin and a small group of soldiers from his battalion reportedly repulsed numerous counterattacks of superior German forces. After three days, he reportedly called down artillery on his own position and was believed killed. For his actions, Saprykin was posthumously awarded the title Hero of the Soviet Union. Saprykin was captured by the German troops and sent to a POW camp. After its liberation by British troops, Saprykin emigrated to Canada to avoid imprisonment if he returned to the Soviet Union. After Soviet authorities discovered his survival, Saprykin's Hero of the Soviet Union award was revoked. Saprykin died in Toronto on 24 April 1990. His Hero of the Soviet Union award was posthumously restored on 4 December 1991.

== Early life ==
Vladimir Saprykin was born on August 24, 1916, in Sukhodol, Tambov Governorate (now Krasninsky District), to a humble peasant family. He graduated from primary school, technical school, and the Voronezh Pedagogical Institute. He became a secondary school teacher in Olkhovatka in Voronezh Oblast. In November 1939, Saprykin was drafted into the Red Army. He graduated from the Grozny Infantry School in May 1941 and was sent to a unit in Belarus with the rank of lieutenant.

== World War II ==
Saprykin became a platoon commander, a company commander, and a battalion commander. By October 1941 he was assistant chief of staff of the 845th Rifle Regiment of the 303rd Rifle Division. South of Yelnya in early October, the regiment was surrounded. Saprykin broke out and reached Soviet lines in December. He was sent to an NKVD filtration camp. On 15 June 1942 he was sentenced by the military tribunal of the 16th Rifle Division under Article 193 of the RSFSR Criminal Code to ten years imprisonment. Saprykin's sentence was suspended and he was sent to the front with a penal battalion. After being wounded, he was transferred to the 612th Rifle Regiment of the 144th Rifle Division in a month. From 17 July 1942 he became a company commander, assistant chief of staff, and later led the regiment's 2nd Rifle Battalion.

On 8 March 1943, Saprykin fought in battles for the village of Krivopuskovo in Tumanovsky District of Smolensk Oblast. He reportedly conducted a personal reconnaissance despite a German firing position and decided to attack the village from the rear. With 35 soldiers, he reportedly eliminated German positions and upon signals from his battalion launched an attack. According to accounts at the time, he threw grenades to submachine gunners in a house and was among the first into the village. On 5 July he was awarded the Order of the Red Star. On 15 October, Saprykin was awarded the Order of Alexander Nevsky for his actions during the recapture of Vyazma, among others. On 1 December 1943, Saprykin's battalion attacked the village of Krasnaya Sloboda. The battalion captured a line of German trenches on a hill and defended the position for three days against repeated German counterattacks. The battalion was cut off by German attacks, and by the third morning, fewer than thirty soldiers remained. German infantry supported by fifteen tanks launched an attack on the position, reportedly advancing within twenty meters of the Soviet positions. Saprykin called artillery fire on his own position. He was believed killed and posthumously awarded the title Hero of the Soviet Union and the Order of Lenin on 3 June 1944.

Saprykin was severely wounded in the chest and was captured by German troops while unconscious. Saprykin was treated and sent to a prisoner of war camp. The camp was liberated by British troops at the end of the war.

== Postwar ==
Saprykin emigrated to Canada to avoid imprisonment if he returned to the Soviet Union. He worked as a longshoreman and then a taxi driver. Saprykin graduated from a university with an engineering degree and got a job in the Admiral company, becoming a quality control specialist. In August 1977 his Hero of the Soviet Union award was cancelled because of his survival. Saprykin was also reported to have served with collaborationist forces. Saprykin died on 24 April 1990 in Toronto and was buried at the Russian Cemetery in Toronto. On 4 December 1991 Saprykin's Hero of the Soviet Union award was restored. In July 1999 his ashes were moved to a mass grave in Krasnaya Sloboda.

== Legacy ==
The eight-year school in Sukhodol was named for Saprykin.

== Personal life ==
In 1938, Saprykin married Elena Konnova.
