= Yablunytsia Pass =

Carpathian mountain pass in Ukraine

Coordinates: 48°18′19″N 24°26′56″E

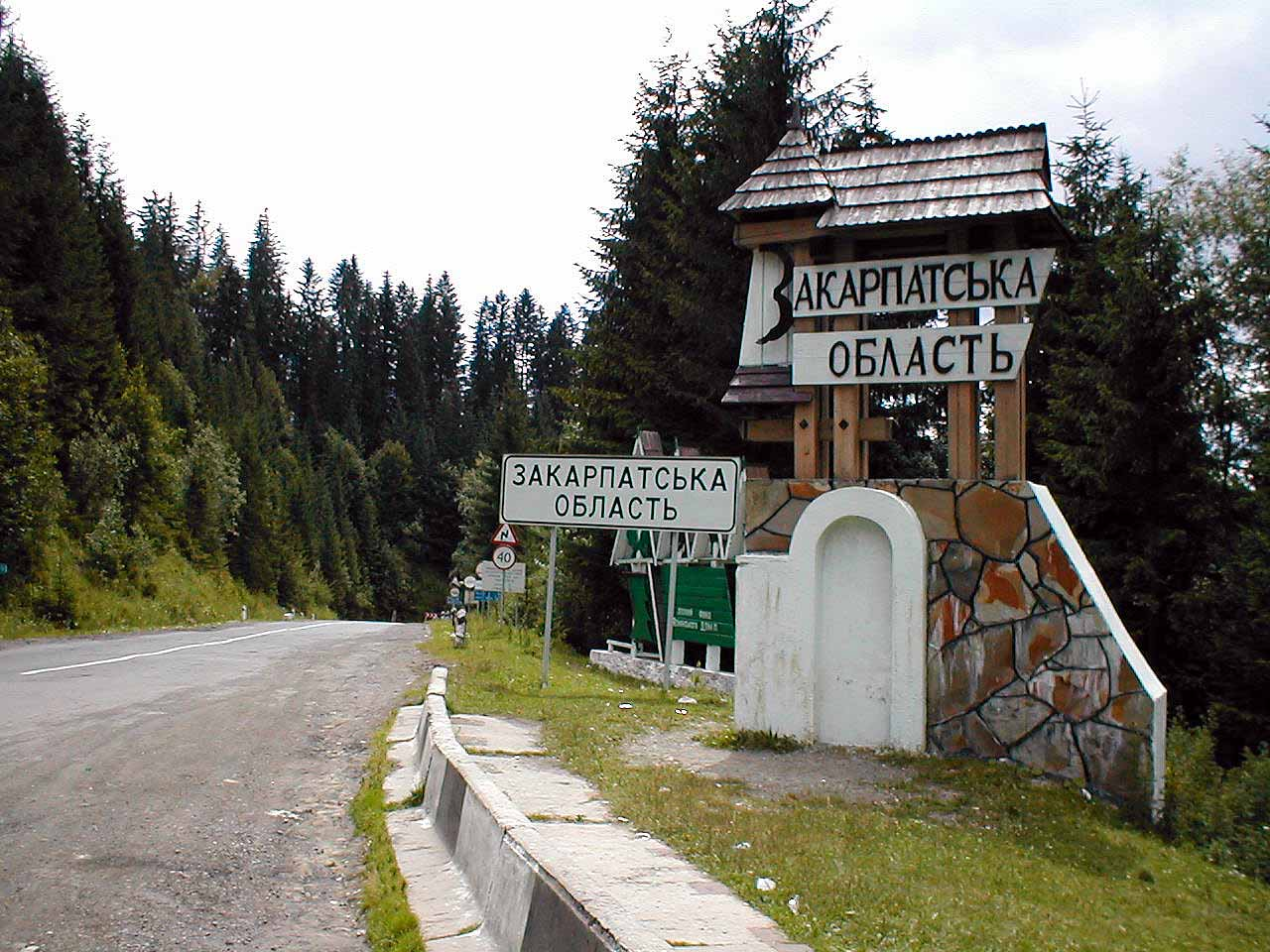
Yablunytskyj Pass

The Yablunytsia Pass is a pass through the Carpathian Mountains in Ukraine, located in the south-western part of Ivano-Frankivsk Oblast. It is one of several passes connecting Transcarpathia with the rest of the country. The headwaters of the Prut River are in the northern end of this pass, and its southern end is part of the Tisza River valley.

The pass used to be a state border several times in history. Until 1920 it was a border between Kingdom of Hungary and Poland, later Habsburg Empire. In the interwar period (1920–1939) it was a border between Czechoslovakia and Poland. Between 1939 and 1945 it was a border Hungary and Poland, later Generalgouverment.

== Gallery ==
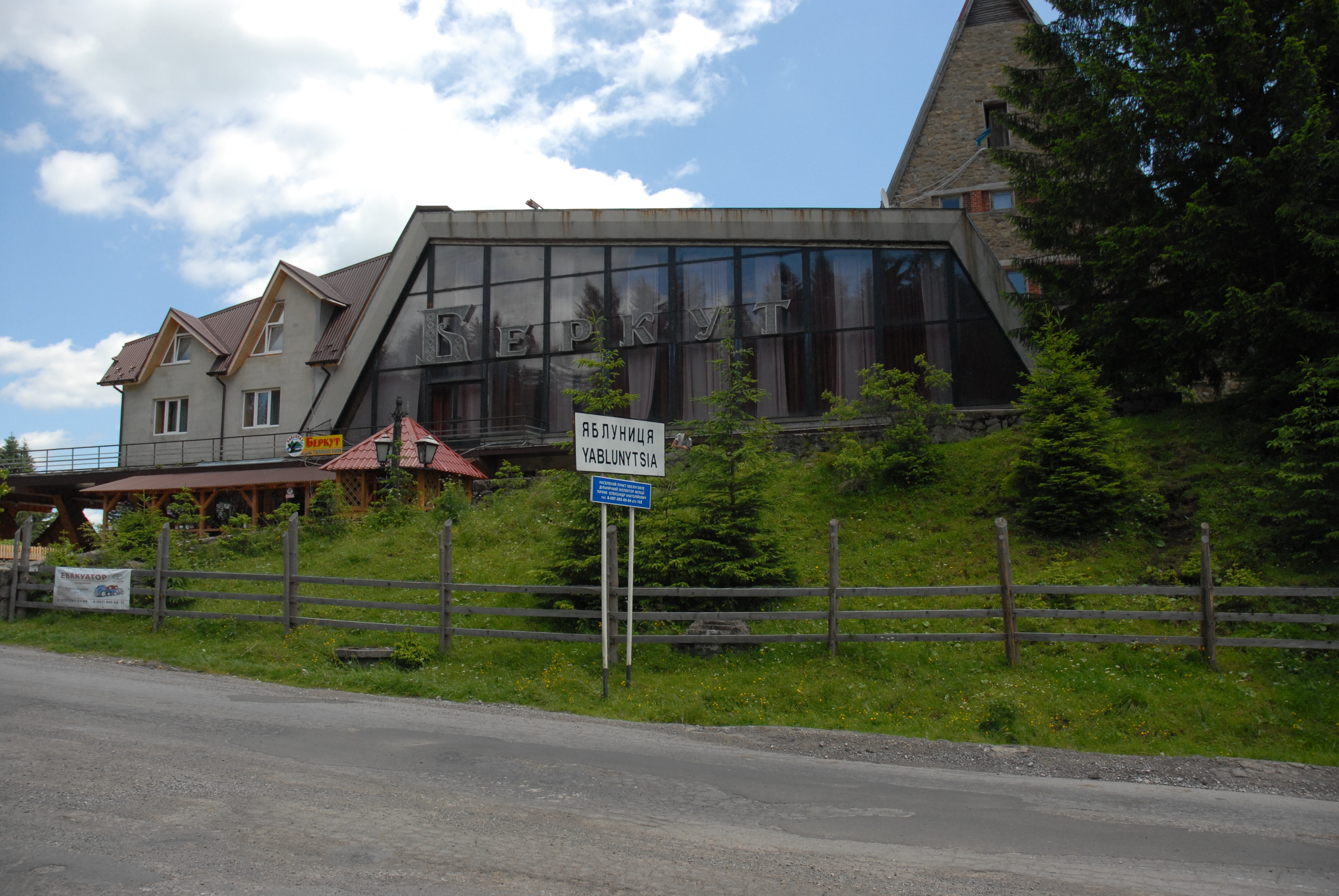
Entrance to Yablunytsia
