= Ivan Bogdanov =

Soviet general and military commander (1897–1942)

Ivan Aleksandrovich Bogdanov
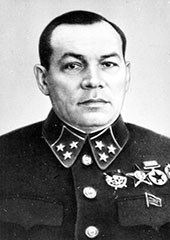
- Born: 6 November 1897; Yablonovka village, Tambovsky Uyezd, Tambov Governorate, Russian Empire
- Died: 22 July 1942 (aged 44) Kalinin, Russian SFSR, Soviet Union
- Allegiance: Russian Empire; Soviet Union
- Branch: Imperial Russian Army; Soviet Red Army
- Service years: 1916–1917 Russian Empire; 1918–1942
- Rank: Lieutenant general
- Commands: Reserve Front; 39th Army; 43rd Army
- Conflicts: World War I Russian Civil War; World War II
- Awards: Order of Lenin; Order of the Red Banner; Order of the Red Star

Ivan Aleksandrovich Bogdanov (Russian: Ива́н Алекса́ндрович Богда́нов; 6 November 1897 – 22 July 1942) was a Soviet lieutenant-general and army commander.

He fought in World War I in the Imperial Russian Army before going over to the Bolsheviks.

In World War II, he commanded the Reserve Front, 43rd Army and 39th Army. He was killed in action on 22 July 1942 at the head of the 39th Army, which was surrounded during Operation Seydlitz. He was seriously wounded in the area of the village of Krapivni Kalininsky region, when he organized and led an attempted breakout. He was rushed to the hospital in Kalinin, but died of his wounds in the hospital on the evening of July 22. He was buried in Kalinin in a mass grave in Lenin Square.

He was a recipient of the Order of Lenin, the Order of the Red Banner and the Order of the Red Star.

== Honours and awards ==
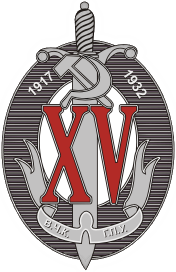
| Order of the Red Banner |
| Order of Lenin |
| Order of the Red Star |
| Jubilee Medal "XX Years of the Workers' and Peasants' Red Army" |
| Honorary worker of the Cheka-GPU (XV) |

== Bibliography ==
- Vozhakin, Mikhail Georgievich, ed. (2005). Великая Отечественная. Командармы. Военный биографический словарь [The Great Patriotic War: Army Commanders: Military Biographical Dictionary] (in Russian). Moscow: Kuchkovo Pole. pp. 28–29. ISBN 5860901135.

Military offices
| Preceded by Dmitry Seleznev | Commander of the 43rd Army; 2-5 September 1941 | Succeeded by Pyotr Sobennikov |
| Preceded by new office | Commander of the 39th Army; November–December 1941 | Succeeded by Ivan Maslennikov |
| Preceded by Ivan Maslennikov | Commander of the 39th Army; 18-22 July 1942 | Succeeded by Alexey Ivanovich Zygin |
