= Sukhodol, Fatezhsky District, Kursk Oblast =

Rural locality in Kursk Oblast, Russia

Sukhodol Суходол
- Village
- Interactive map of Sukhodol
- Location of Sukhodol Sukhodol (Kursk Oblast)
- Coordinates: 52°01′09″N 35°38′11″E
- Country: Russia
- Federal subject: Kursk Oblast
- Administrative district: Fatezhsky District
- SelsovietSelsoviet: Soldatsky
- Elevation: 191 m (627 ft)

Population (2010 Census)
  - Total: 37
  - Estimate (2010): 37 (0%)

Municipal status
  - Municipal district: Fatezhsky Municipal District
  - Rural settlement: Soldatsky Selsoviet Rural Settlement
- Time zone: UTC+3 (MSK)
- Postal code: 307105
- Dialing code: +7 47144
- OKTMO ID: 38644468261
- Website: мосолдатский.рф

Sukhodol (Russian: Суходол) is a rural locality (Russian: деревня, lit. 'village') in Soldatsky Selsoviet Rural Settlement, Fatezhsky District, Kursk Oblast, Russia. Population: 37 (2010 census); 70 (2002 census); 96 (1989 Soviet census).

== Geography ==
The village is located in the Khalchi River basin (a link tributary of the Usozha in the basin of the Svapa), 87 km from the Russia–Ukraine border, 49 km north-west of Kursk, 15.5 km south-west of the district center – the town Fatezh, 9 km from the selsoviet center – Soldatskoye.

Climate

Sukhodol has a warm-summer humid continental climate (Dfb in the Köppen climate classification).

== Transport ==
Sukhodol is located 14 km from the federal route M-2 Crimea Highway as part of the European route E105, 9 km from the road of regional importance 38K-038 (Fatezh – Dmitriyev), 4 km from the road of intermunicipal significance 38Н-679 (38K-038 – Soldatskoye – Shuklino), 0.5 km from the road 38Н-681 (38N-679 – Verkhniye Khalchi), 26.5 km from the nearest railway halt 552 km (railway line Navlya – Lgov-Kiyevsky).

The rural locality is situated 53 km from Kursk Vostochny Airport, 165 km from Belgorod International Airport and 248 km from Voronezh Peter the Great Airport.
