= Romodanovo, Republic of Mordovia =

Rural locality in Mordovia, Russia

Coordinates: 54°25′17″N 45°19′51″E

Romodanovo (Russian: Ромода́ново, Erzya: Ромоданово) is a rural locality (a settlement) and the administrative center of Romodanovsky District of the Republic of Mordovia, Russia. Population: 9,410 (2010 census); 9,871 (2002 census); 10,083 (1989 Soviet census).
