= Romodanovsky District =

Romodanovsky District Ромодановский район
- District

Other transcription(s)
  - Erzya: Рамаданбуе
  - Moksha: Ромодановань аймак
- Location of Romodanovsky District in the Republic of Mordovia
- Coordinates: 54°25′N 45°21′E
- Country: Russia
- Federal subject: Republic of Mordovia
- Established: 16 July 1928
- Administrative center: Romodanovo

Area
  - Total: 820.8 km^{2} (316.9 sq mi)

Population (2010 Census)
  - Total: 20,702
  - Density: 25.22/km^{2} (65.32/sq mi)
  - Urban: 45.5%
  - Rural: 54.5%

Administrative structure
  - Administrative divisions: 17 Selsoviets
  - Inhabited localities: 49 rural localities

Municipal structure
  - Municipally incorporated as: Romodanovsky Municipal District
  - Municipal divisions: 0 urban settlements, 17 rural settlements
- Time zone: UTC+3 (MSK)
- OKTMO ID: 89640000
- Website: http://romodanovo.e-mordovia.ru/

Population of Romodanovsky District
- 2010 Census: 20,702
- 2002 Census: 21,986
- 1989 Census: 23,433
- 1979 Census: 27,409

Romodanovsky District (Russian: Ромода́новский райо́н; Erzya: Рамаданбуе, Ramadanbuje; Moksha: Ромодановань аймак, Romodanovań ajmak) is an administrative and municipal district (raion), one of the twenty-two in the Republic of Mordovia, Russia. It is located in the eastern central part of the republic. The area of the district is 820.8 square kilometers (316.9 sq mi). Its administrative center is the rural locality (a settlement) of Romodanovo. As of the 2010 Census, the total population of the district was 20,702, with the population of Romodanovo accounting for 45.5% of that number.

== Administrative and municipal status ==
Within the framework of administrative divisions, Romodanovsky District is one of the twenty-two in the republic. The district is divided into seventeen selsoviets which comprise forty-nine rural localities. As a municipal division, the district is incorporated as Romodanovsky Municipal District. Its seventeen selsoviets are incorporated into seventeen rural settlements within the municipal district. The settlement of Romodanovo serves as the administrative center of both the administrative and municipal district.
