= Yaremche Municipality =

Former subdivision of Ivano-Frankivsk Oblast, Ukraine

Yaremche Municipality Яремчанська міська рада
- Raion
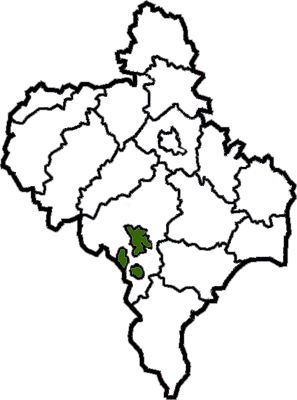
- Coordinates: 48°28′15″N 24°34′46″E
- Country: Ukraine
- Region: Ivano-Frankivsk Oblast
- Established: December 30, 1977
- Admin. center: Yaremche
- Subdivisions: List: 1 — city councils; 1 — settlement councils; 4 — rural councils; Number of localities: 1 — cities; 1 — urban-type settlements; 5 — villages; 0 — rural settlements

Government
  - Governor: Vasyl Onutchak

Area
  - Total: 657 km^{2} (254 sq mi)

Population (2020)
  - Total: 23,186
  - Density: 35.3/km^{2} (91.4/sq mi)
- Time zone: UTC+02:00 (EET)
  - Summer (DST): UTC+03:00 (EEST)
- Area code: +380-3434

Yaremche Municipality was an administrative subdivision of the Ivano-Frankivsk Oblast. Population: 23,186 (2020 est.). The municipality was created on December 30, 1977 out of the Nadvirna Raion. In 2006 the official name of it changed from Yaremcha to Yaremche. On December 14, 2006 the spelling of Yaremche officially has changed from Yaremcha. Most of the municipality is located within the Nadvirna Raion consisting of three non-adjacent territories (split by high mountains), one of which is bordering also Zakarpattia Oblast.

Administratively, until 2020, Yaremche was designated the city of oblast significance, and Yaremche Municipality was the territory subordinated to Yaremche City Council. On 18 July 2020, as part of the administrative reform of Ukraine, the number of raions of Ivano-Frankivsk Oblast was reduced to six, and Yaremche Municipality was abolished as an administrative subdivision and merged into Nadvirna Raion. The last estimate of the municipality population was 622,012 (2020 est.).

Historical population
Year	Pop.	±%
2007	21,765	—
2008	21,844	+0.4%
2009	21,975	+0.6%
2010	22,187	+1.0%
2013	22,604	+1.9%
2016	23,127	+2.3%
Note: 2010 data is valid thru October; Source: Regional Statistics Office

== Administrative division ==
At the time of disestablishment, the municipality consisted of three hromadas:

- Polianytsia rural hromada with the administration in the selo of Polianytsia;
- Vorokhta settlement hromada with the administration in the urban-type settlement of Vorokhta;
- Yaremche urban hromada with the administration in the city of Yaremche.

Urban municipalities

- Yaremche
- Vorokhta (urban-type settlement)

Rural municipalities (communes)

- Mykulychyn
- Polyanytsya
- Tatariv
- Yablunytsya (Voronenko)

== Geography ==
The Yaremche municipality is located on the northeastern slopes of the Carpathian Mountains. It possesses numerous ski resorts such as Bukovel, there are also several of them near Vorokhta as well.

The main body of water is Prut river.

== Infrastructure ==
=== Transportation ===
There is a railroad communication. The main railway terminal is located in Yaremche, however there is a rail station in Vorokhta as well. Through the municipality also run several automobile roads such as the national route H09 and the regional – P24 that starting at Tatariv and making some loop eventually heads to Ternopil Oblast. The closest airport is located in Ivano-Frankivsk.
