= Yablunytsia, Nadvirna Raion, Ivano-Frankivsk Oblast =

Rural locality and ski resort in Ivano-Frankivsk Oblast, Ukraine

Coordinates: 48.3°N 24.5°E

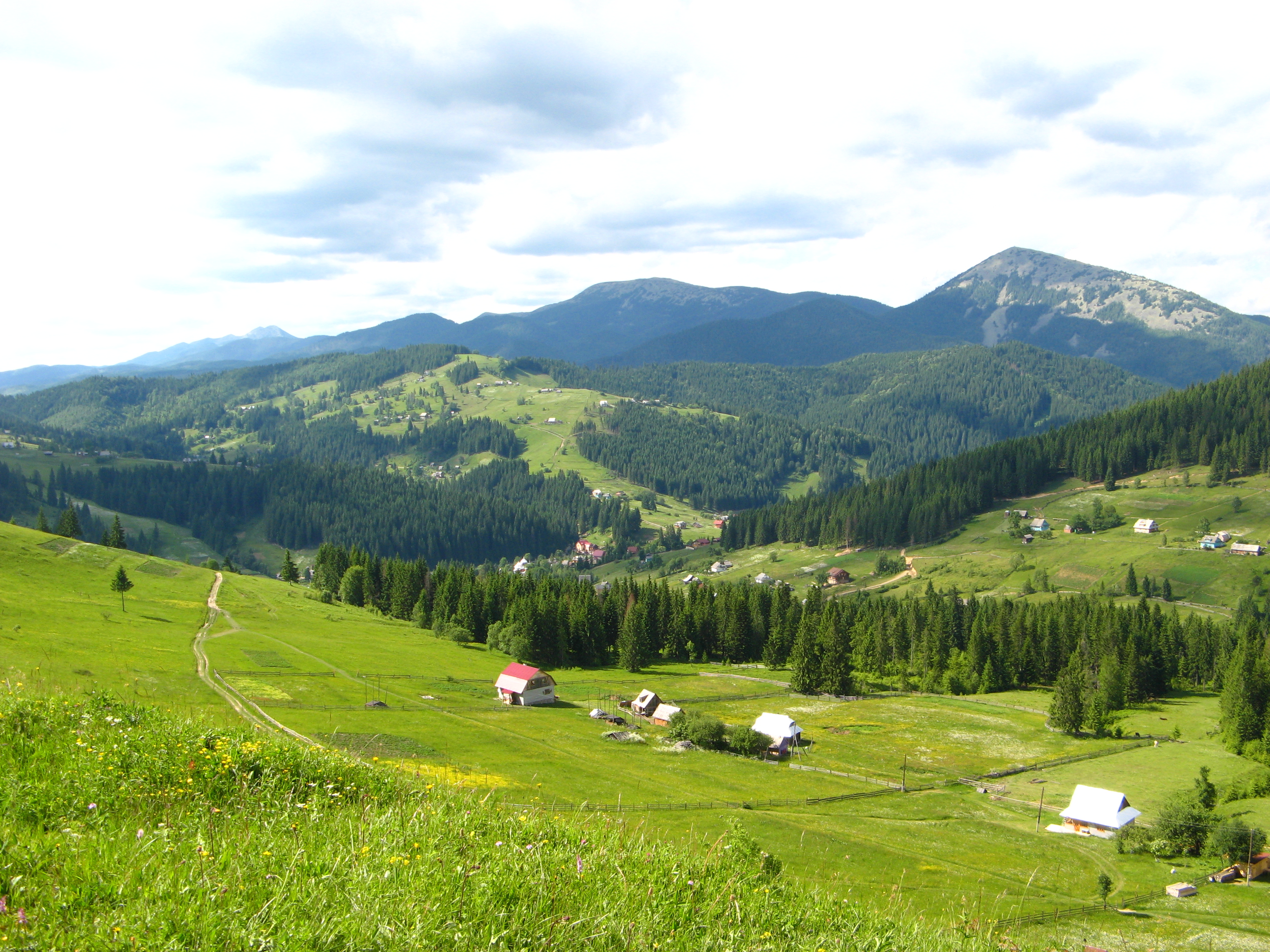
View of Yablunytsia

Yablunytsia (Ukrainian: Яблуниця) is a small village in Nadvirna Raion, Ivano-Frankivsk Oblast in Ukraine. It is a ski resort in the winter time. Yablunytsia belongs to Polianytsia rural hromada, one of the hromadas of Ukraine.

== History ==
During World War II, there was a border pass to Hungary which was guarded by a special German sub-branch of security police settled in Tatariv (Aussenstelle). Many Hungarian Jews were transported to and shot in Yablunytsya.

Until 18 July 2020, Yablunytsia belonged to Yaremche Municipality. The municipality was abolished in July 2020 as part of the administrative reform of Ukraine, which reduced the number of raions of Ivano-Frankivsk Oblast to six. The area of Yaremche Municipality was merged into Nadvirna Raion.
