= Avanhard =

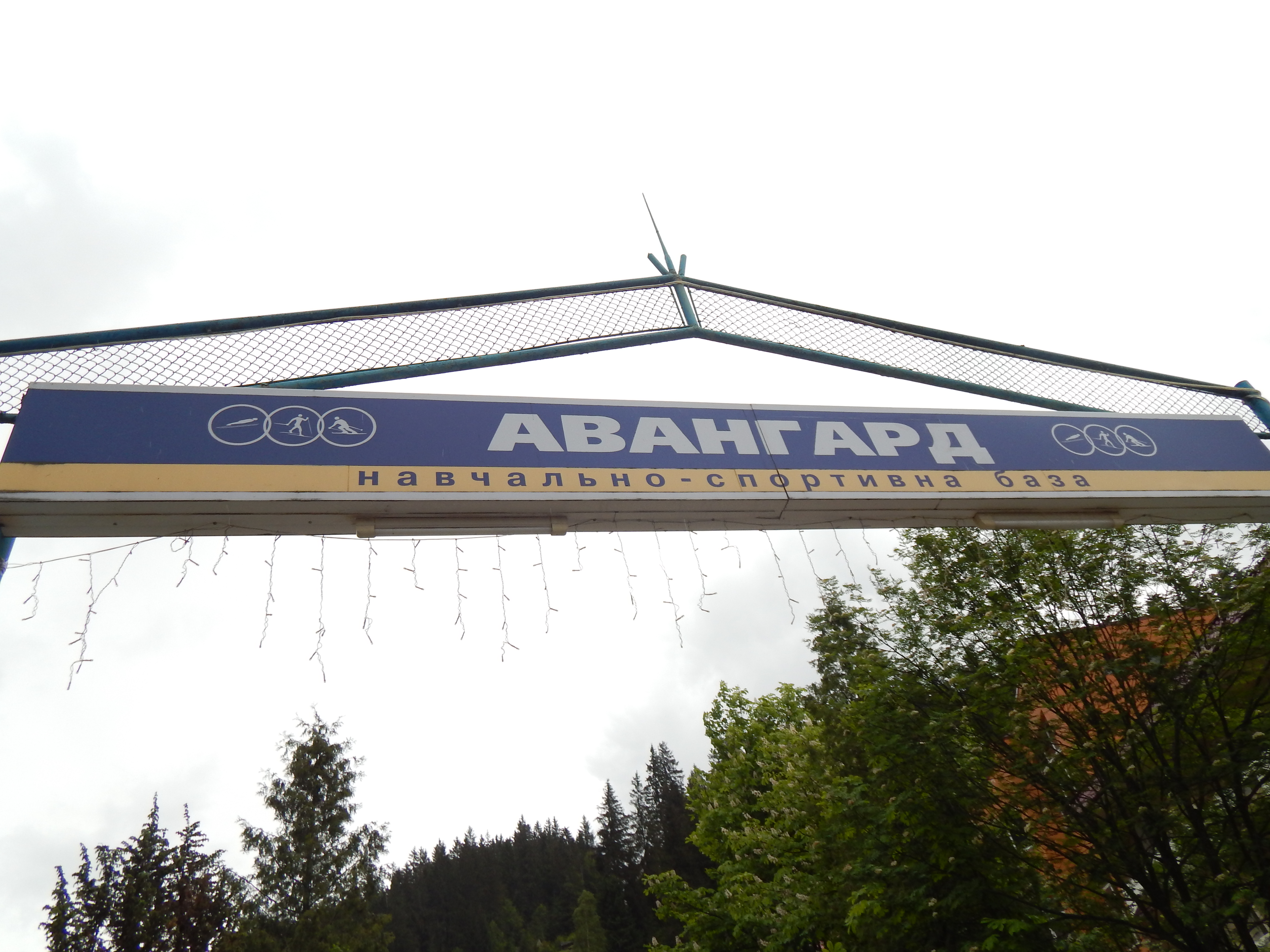

Avanhard (Ukrainian: Авангард) is a Ukrainian form of avant-garde. In Ukraine it is associated often with a sports society of the Soviet period (Avanhard).

It may refer to:

- Avanhard, Odesa Oblast, an urban locality in Odesa Oblast, Ukraine
- Avanhard (Vorokhta), a ski resort and sports base in the Vorokhta, Ukraine
- Avanhard (sports society), a trade unions sports society
- Avanhard Stadium (disambiguation)
