= Zarosliak =

- Location within Ivano-Frankivsk Oblast Location within Ukraine
- Location: Gorgany
- Nearest city: Vorokhta
- Coordinates: 48.164°N 24.538°E
- Base elevation: 1,330 m (4,360 ft)
- Website: Archive of the original Official website as of March 4, 2016 at web.archive.org

Zarosliak (Ukrainian: Навчально-спортивна база «Заросляк») is a high mountain sports training resort near town of Vorokhta (Yaremche city), Ukraine. It is located within the Carpathian National Nature Park at the foot of mount Hoverla. The resort is smaller than the nearly located Bukovel and more sports oriented.

== History ==
Since 1880 in place of a modern sports resort existed a tourist resort under the name "Heinrich Hoffbauer Tatra Polish Association". Heinrich Hoffbauer was known for creating the first tourist route over the Chornohora Ridge. During 1911-18 the resort suffered from fire and military conflicts of the World War I and was completely devastated. It was revived in 1923-27 and until the Soviet invasion was accepting 120-150 visitors a day. During the World War II it was destroyed once again and for some time became forgotten.

The modern resort traces its history from 1959. Since that time the resort was listed among the Olympic venues of the Ukrainian SSR and since 1991 - Ukraine. In 2004 here was built a 12-meter ski ramp for freestyle. Since a major renovations that took place in 2008, Zarosliak may accept up to 90 visitors a day.
