= Avanhard (Vorokhta) =

- Interactive map of Avanhard
- Location: Gorgany
- Nearest city: Vorokhta
- Coordinates: 48.299318°N 24.572863°E
- Base elevation: 790 m (2,590 ft)
- Skiable area: 5.5 ha (14 acres)
- Trails: 7 (including 5 ramps)
- Longest run: 500 m (1,600 ft)
- Lift system: 2 lifts

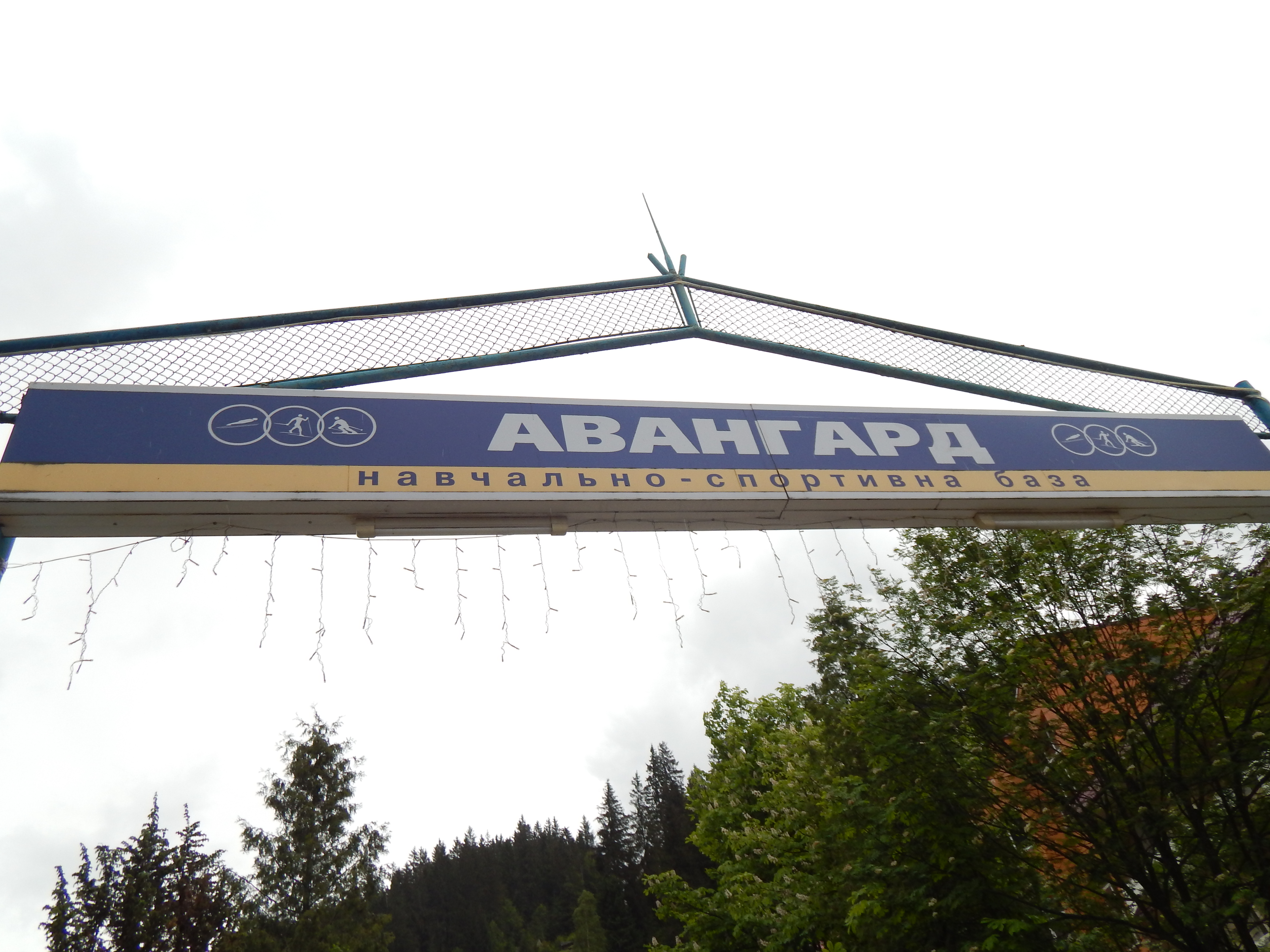
Entrance banner

Avanhard (Cyrillic: Авангард) is a ski resort and a main sports base for Olympic preparation in the town of Vorokhta, Ukraine. It is the biggest of five still operational ski jumping facilities in the country and one of three located in the Ivano-Frankivsk Oblast. Vorokhta is frequently associated with the resort and the resort is often referred to simply as Vorokhta or as the "Ramps of Vorokhta" (Ukrainian: Трампліни у Ворохті).

The resort is popular among both domestic and international athletes. During the times of the Soviet Union, and currently in Ukraine, Avanhard was and is considered to have the best complex of ski ramps.

== Brief description ==
The resort is best known for its ski ramps complex which consists of three ramps (48.298626°N 24.57414°E). The ski ramps are served by a chairlift. The smaller piste is served by a 200-meter-long bugel lift. There is also a training piste for beginners. Next to the resort hotel "Avanhard" another 500-meter-long piste and a speedy bugel lift are located. There is also a children's training track that stretches for 30 meters. The resort is fenced away from the adjacent highway and the Prut River.

The biggest 90-meter ramp (K-90) with artificial surface was built back in 1967. It was renovated only in 1990. Since 1986 Avanhard has been the location of the Cup of the Carpathians. In 1986-91 the competition acquired a FIS status and Avanhard was visited by such athletes as Jan Boklöv, Ari-Pekka Nikkola, and Jens Weißflog.

The first ski ramp in Vorokhta was built when the region was part of the Second Polish Republic in 1925 and the second in 1930. Besides the three main ramps there are two smaller ones located to the north. The complex has a children's sports school. In 2007-09 major renovations took place at the ski base. Since 2011 the resort has been a center for conducting "Halych Games" that are organized by the sports association "Ukraina" and sponsored by the Council of trade unions of Ukraine. In March 2013, the head of the Olympic committee in the Ivano-Frankivsk Oblast stated that ski ramps still require major renovations.

The resort's three-story hotel (Tramplin) provides lodging. Beside the resort hotel in a vicinity closer to a shorter and smaller ramp is located a cottage complex "Ruslana's huts" that consists of seven two-story cottages (48.30049°N 24.57462°E). Additional lodging space is provided by a bigger and newer sports-hotel complex "Kolos-Ukraina" which is located just to the south of the town. Both Avanhard and Kolos-Ukraina are available to the general public as well as athletes.

The Vorokhta rail station is located in the town southwest 1 km (0.62 mi) away from the Avanhard sports resort along the highway P24 (Vorokhta-Verkhovyna).

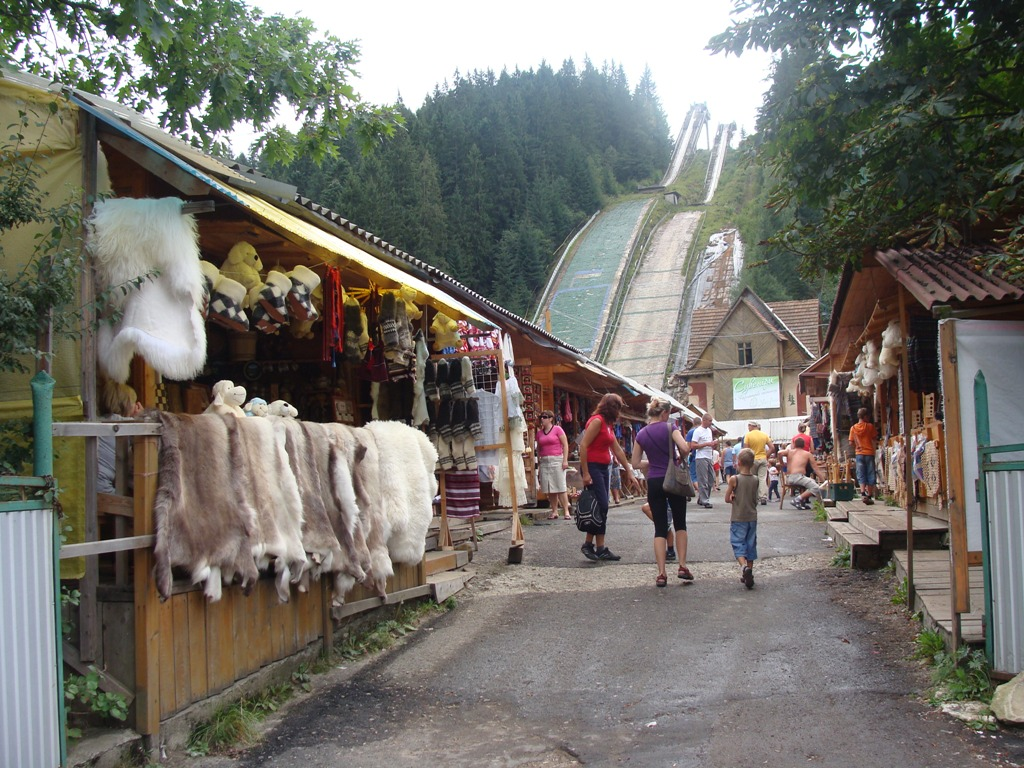
Souvenir market and ski ramps

== See also ==
- Avanhard (sports society)
- Ukraine (sports society)
