= Polianytsia rural hromada =

Rural hromada of Ivano-Frankivsk Oblast, Ukraine

Polianytsia rural hromada Поляницька сільська громада
- Hromada
- Interactive map of Polianytsia rural hromada
- Country: Ukraine
- Oblast: Ivano-Frankivsk
- Raion: Nadvirna

Area
  - Total: 342.9 km^{2} (132.4 sq mi)

Population (2023)
  - Total: 4,258
  - Density: 12.42/km^{2} (32.16/sq mi)
- Settlements: 7
- Villages: 7
- Website: polyanytsya.if.ua

Polianytsia rural territorial hromada (Ukrainian: Поляницька сільська територіальна громада, romanized: Polianytska silska terytorialna hromada) is one of Ukraine's hromadas, located in Nadvirna Raion, Ivano-Frankivsk Oblast. Its administrative centre is the village of Polianytsia.

The hromada has an area of 342.9 km^{2} (132.4 mi^{2}), as well as a total population of 4,258 (as of 2023).

A popular Ukrainian ski resort Bukovel is located on the territory of the hromada.

== Composition ==
The hromada includes seven villages:

- Bystrytsia
- Klympushi
- Polianytsia
- Prychil
- Voronenko
- Yablunytsia
- Zhary
