= Vorokhta =

Rural settlement in Ivano-Frankivsk Oblast, Ukraine

Vorokhta Ворохта
- Rural settlement
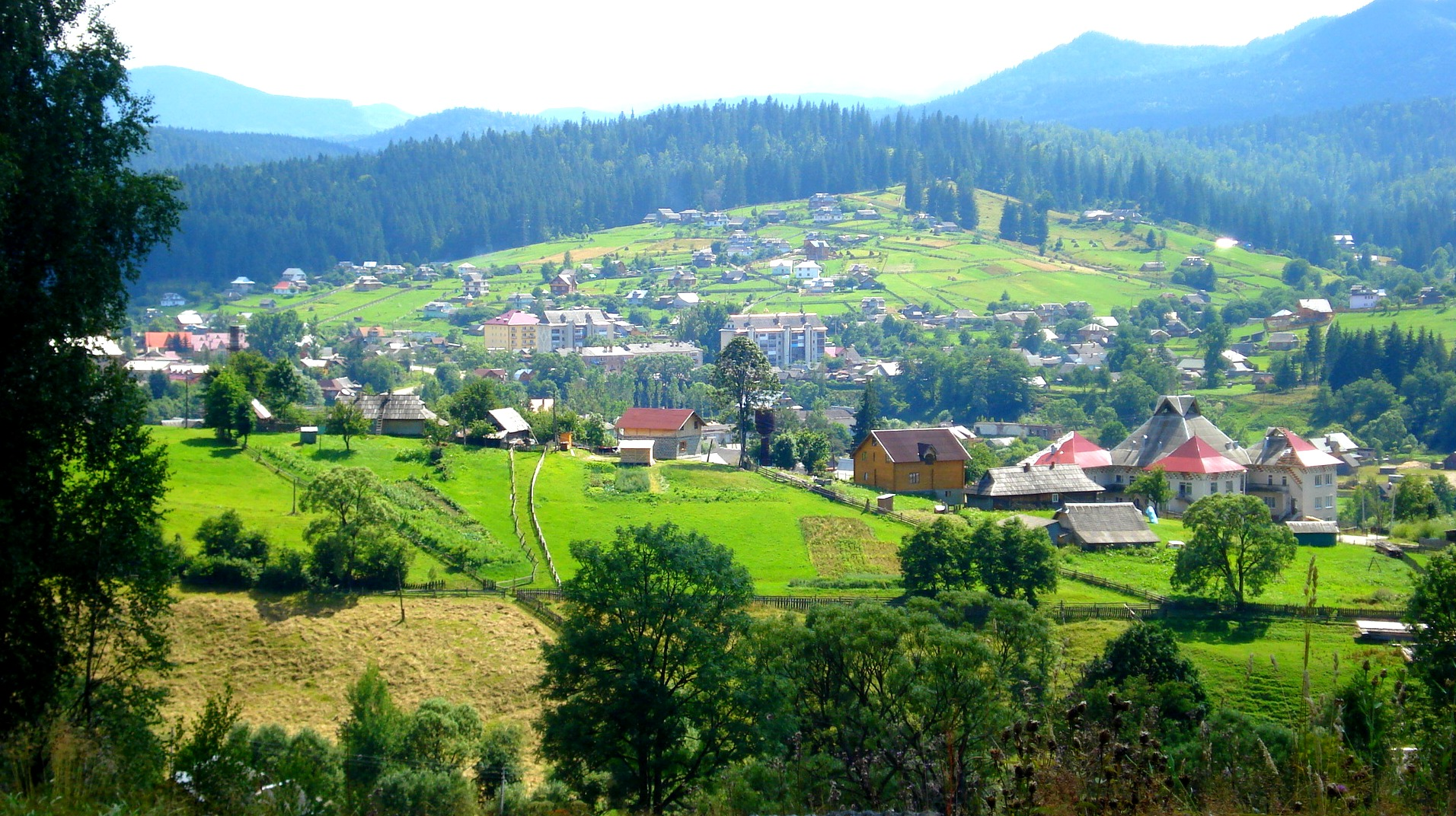
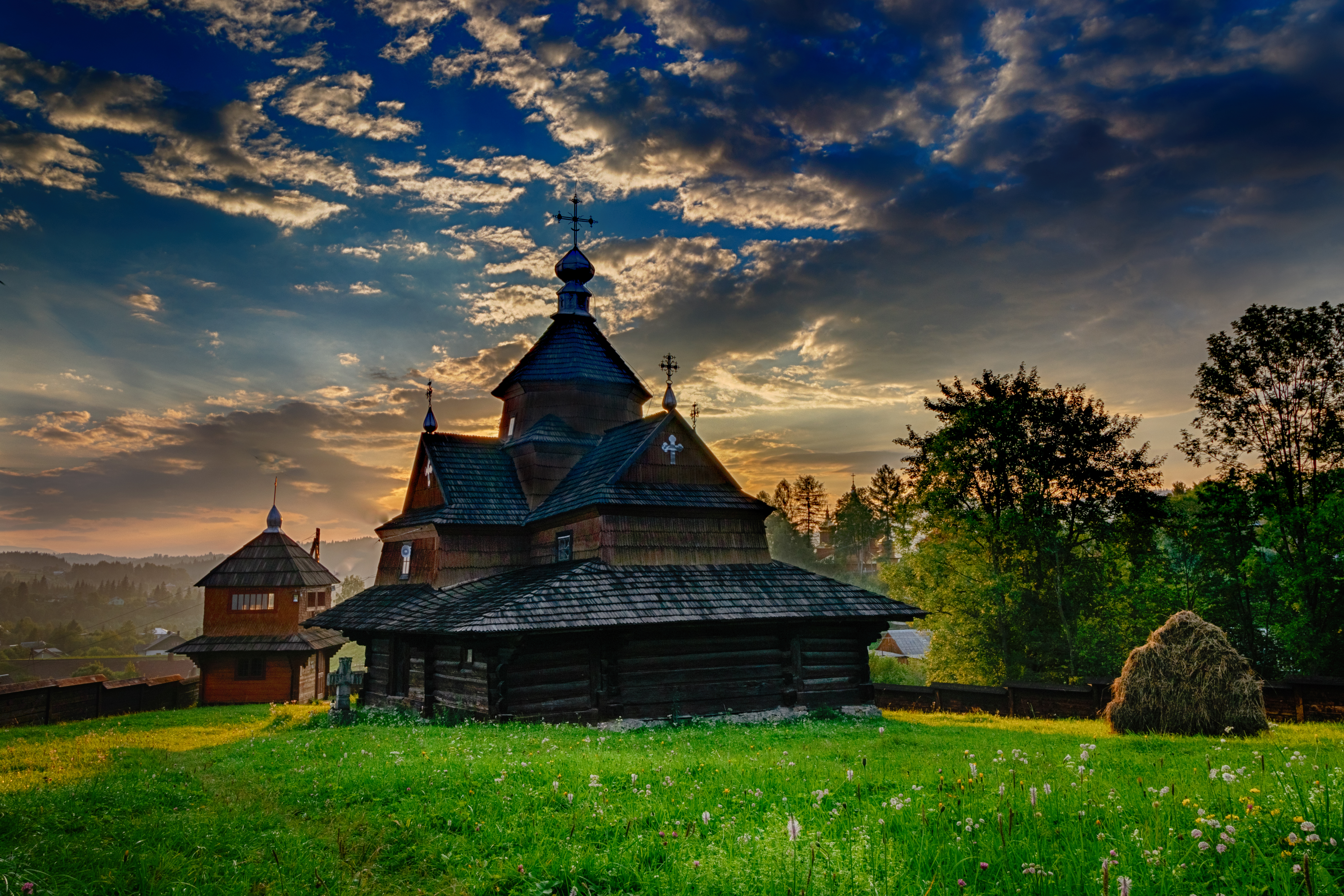
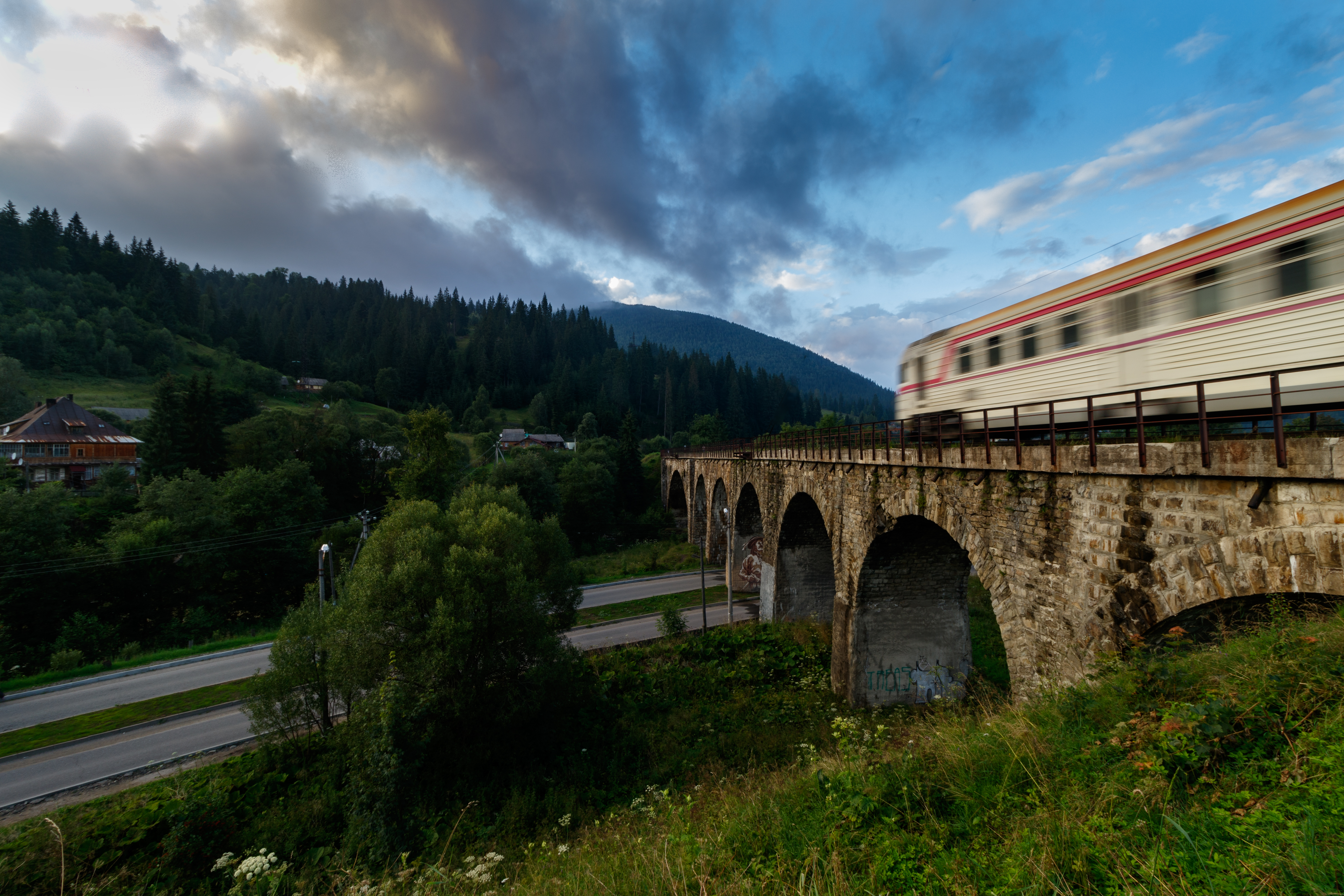
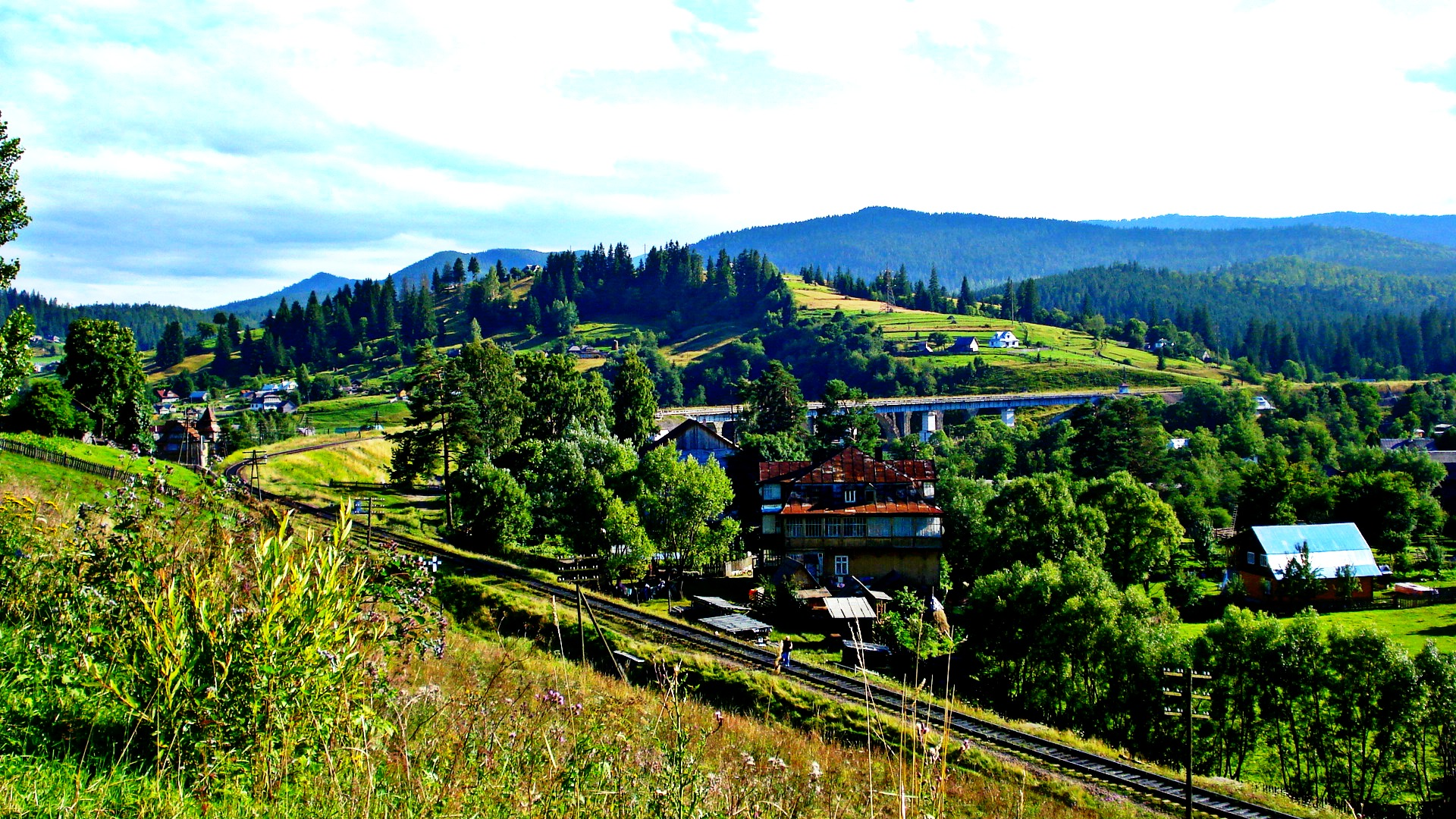
- Vorokhta landscape

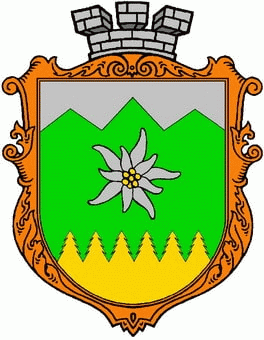
- Flag Coat of arms

- Vorokhta in Ivano-Frankivsk Oblast Vorokhta (Ukraine)
- Coordinates: 48°16′57″N 24°33′46″E
- Country: Ukraine
- Oblast: Ivano-Frankivsk Oblast
- Raion: Nadvirna Raion
- Hromada: Vorokhta settlement hromada
- First mentioned: 17th century

Government
  - Head of council: Petro Kermoshchuk

Area
  - Total: 15 km^{2} (5.8 sq mi)
- Elevation: 850 m (2,790 ft)

Population (2022)
  - Total: 4,207
  - Density: 280/km^{2} (730/sq mi)
- Website: http://vorokhtainfo.com

Vorokhta (Ukrainian: Ворохта; Polish: Worochta) is a rural settlement located in the Carpathian Mountains on the Prut River in Ukraine. It is part of Nadvirna Raion, Ivano-Frankivsk Oblast. Historically, it is a tourist spa town and later was also turned into a ski resort with several ski-jumping ramps (Avanhard). Vorokhta hosts the administration of Vorokhta settlement hromada, one of the hromadas of Ukraine. Population: 4,207 (2022 estimate); due to a constant flow of tourists, its population almost year-round is bigger.

Located at an elevation of 800 metres (2,600 ft) above sea level, it is known for its close ties to the Hutsuls – an ethno-cultural group of Ukrainians who live in the Carpathians, and is often regarded as a Hutsul capital.

== Geography ==
The town is located near the administrative border with Zakarpattia Oblast in the Verkhovyna-Putyla Mountains close to the Yablunytsia Pass and source of the Prut River. Vorokhta is surrounded by the Carpathian National Nature Park and the ethnographic area of Hutsuls. The town is surrounded by such mount peaks as Mahora, Makivka, and others.

== History ==
According to oral legends, Vorokhta was established in the 17th century. So claimed to be the Polish ethnographer Jan Falkowski. Supposedly near village Mykulychyn settled a run away from the army of Crown of Poland by name Vorokhta. The main population consisted of peasants who were engaged in growing livestock, land cultivation, handcraft industries. The local population actively supported the anti-Polish Opryshky uprising which was taking place in the vicinity until mid 19th century. Following the 1848 Spring of Nations, in Austria was abolished serfdom, yet big landowners remained in Vorokhta with one owning up to 800 morgen of polonyna.

Due to difficult economic situation many locals soon began finding places to earn money elsewhere immigrating to countries of the New World, Canada, Brazil, Argentina.

With construction of railway Stanislau–Worochta–Rachow over Carpathian ridge in 1894, there increased development of the town. In 1906–10 at times of Austria in Vorokhta was built a forest mill and started to grow population. In the beginning of the 20th century there also was activated socially political and cultural life and the town was visited by number of Ukrainian writers such as Marko Cheremshyna and Mykhailo Kotsiubynsky. In 1903 in Vorokhta was established a local branch of Galician-based Ukrainian educational organization of Prosvita.

Already during World War I, Vorokhta became a place of battle actions. During times of the restored Poland it became a popular mid-upland climatic resort and tourist attraction. In September 1939 Vorokhta became occupied by Soviet troops during the 1939 Soviet occupation of Poland and in November of the same year became part of Ukraine (at that time the Ukrainian SSR). In 1960 Vorokhta was granted status of urban-type settlement.

The area of Vorokhta was in the mid-14th century annexed by the Kingdom of Poland, and remained in Poland until 1772 (see Partitions of Poland). From 1772 to 1918, it belonged to Austrian Galicia, and after World War I, the town returned to Poland. In 1928, the government of the Second Polish Republic named it a spa. In the interwar period, Vorokhta/Worochta was part of Nadworna County, Stanisławów Voivodeship. Until July 1939, the town was a garrison of Worochta Battalion of the Border Protection Corps. At that time, Vorokhta was a popular tourist spa. Here, Polish Prime Minister Kazimierz Bartel had a villa, here stayed popular poet Jerzy Liebert, who suffered from tuberculosis.

Worochta was occupied by the Soviet army 1939-1941 and by Nazi German army 1941-1944. During world war II, Germans killed 653 Jewish inhabitants of Worochta. Worochta was captured by advancing Red Army on 29 September 1944. On New Year's Eve 1945, local partisans of the UPA carried out a massacre of Polish population of Worochta, killing 72.

Until 18 July 2020, Vorokhta belonged to Yaremche Municipality. The municipality was abolished in July 2020 as part of the administrative reform of Ukraine, which reduced the number of raions of Ivano-Frankivsk Oblast to six. The area of Yaremche Municipality was merged into Nadvirna Raion.

Until 26 January 2024, Vorokhta was designated urban-type settlement. On this day, a new law entered into force which abolished this status, and Vorokhta became a rural settlement.

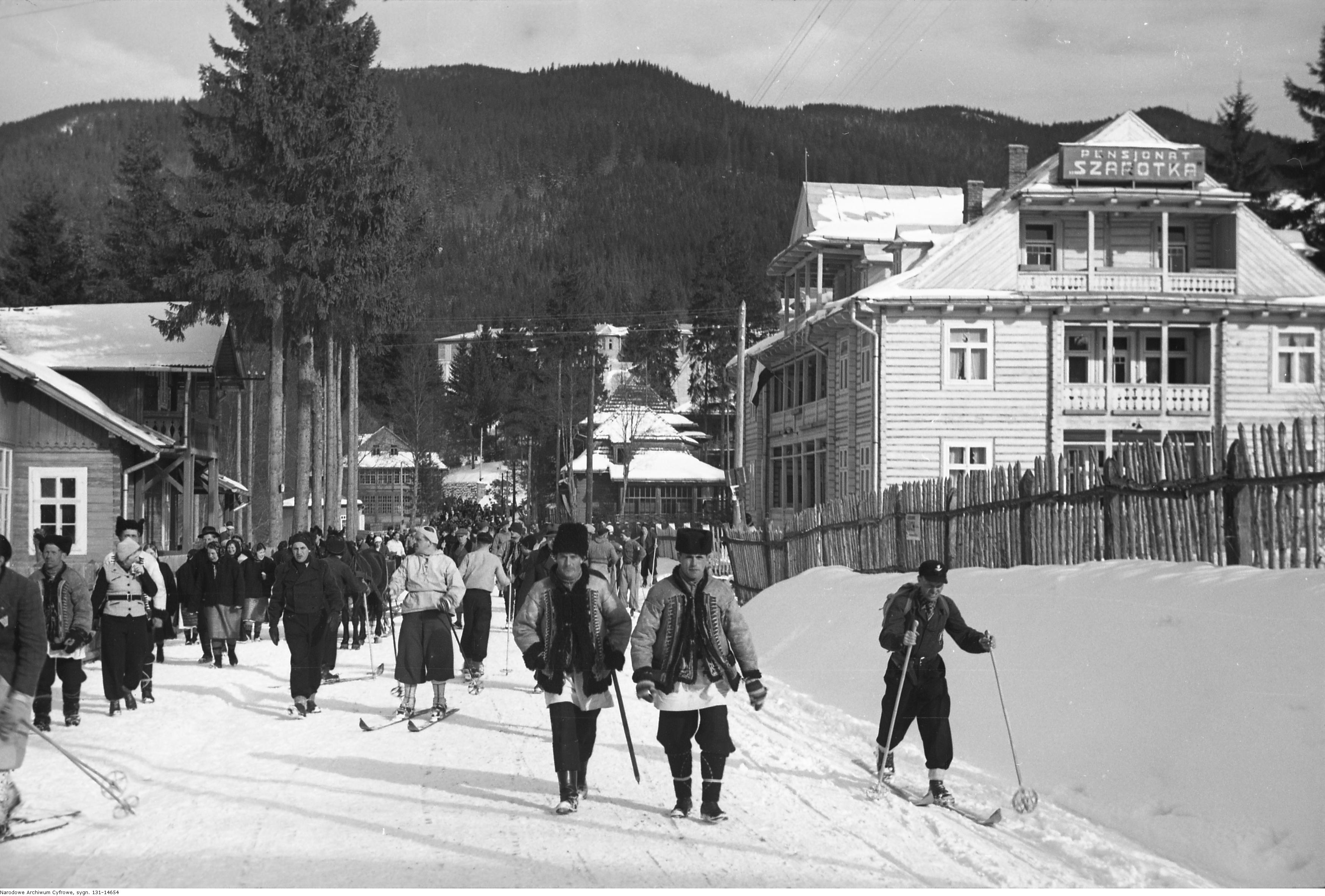
Vorokhta in 1938

== Infrastructure ==
The area became of great interest soon after installation of a railroad through the region in the 1880s. Since obtaining its independence after World War I, Poland has developed the eastern Carpathian region into a great vacation spot. Today, Vorokhta is the center of winter sports, with several ski-lifts. Beside its own ski resort Avanhard that carried the All-Union status in the Soviet Union, in close proximity and higher into mountains is located another sports resort Zarosliak. Number of hotels (cottage complexes) in area is relative low around 6-8 (small to medium size), however, there are several dozens of private houses that are available for rent.

The town is served by rail (see Vorokhta railway station). In the town there is a forest mill, health recovering sanatoriums for those who are ill on active form of tuberculosis and bone tuberculosis.

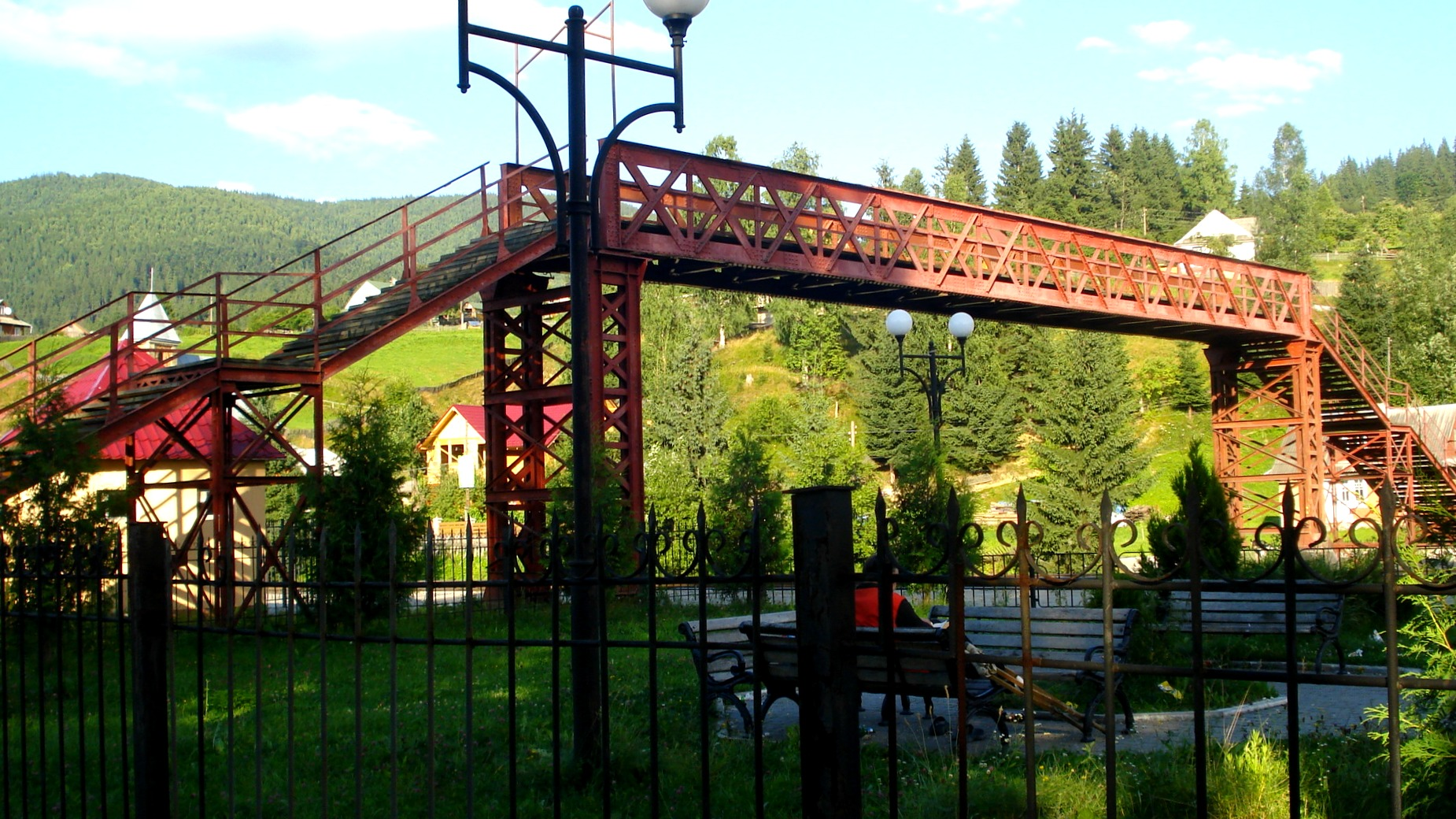
Pedestrian bridge over railways

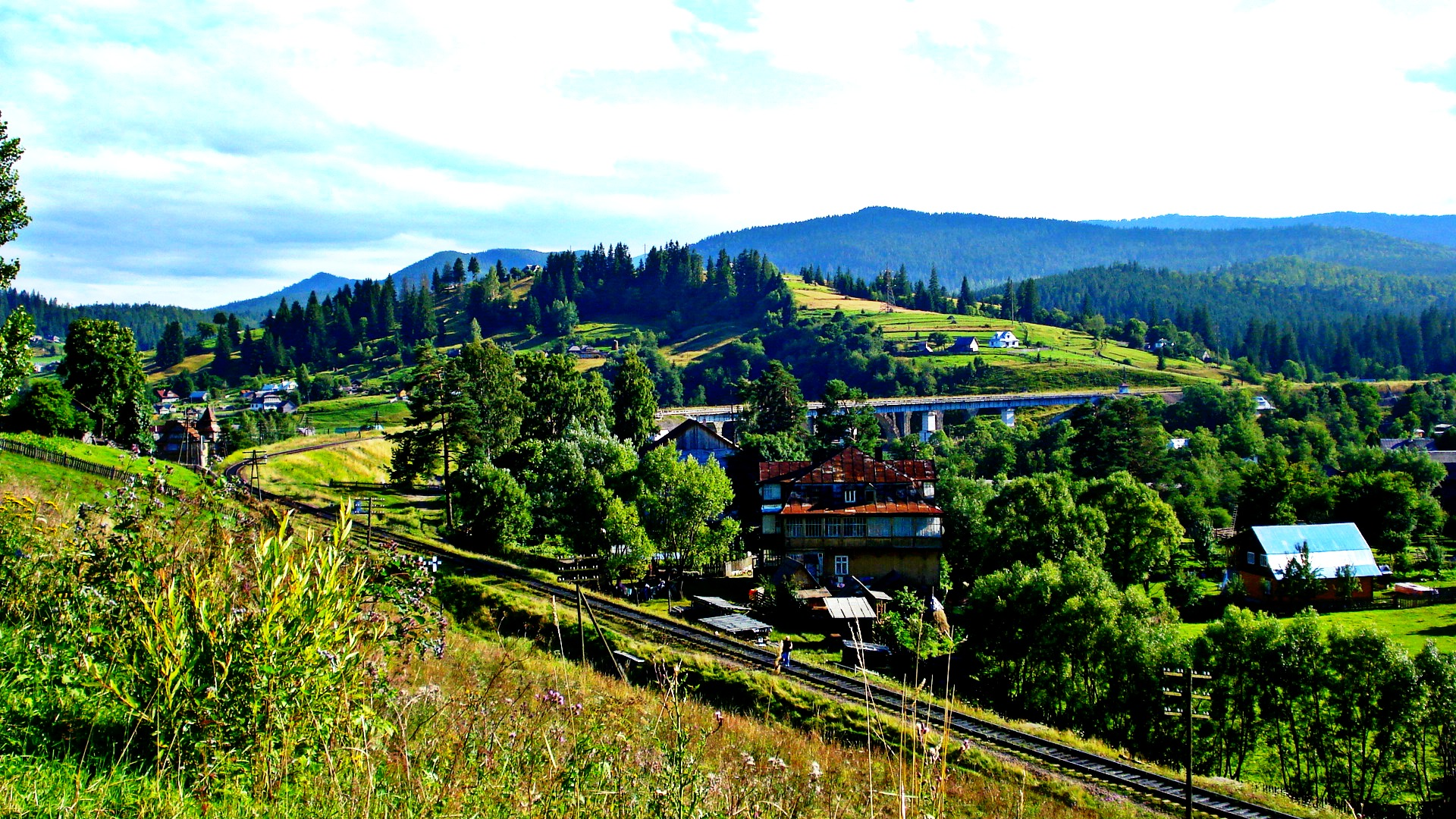
A railroad and a bridge (summer)

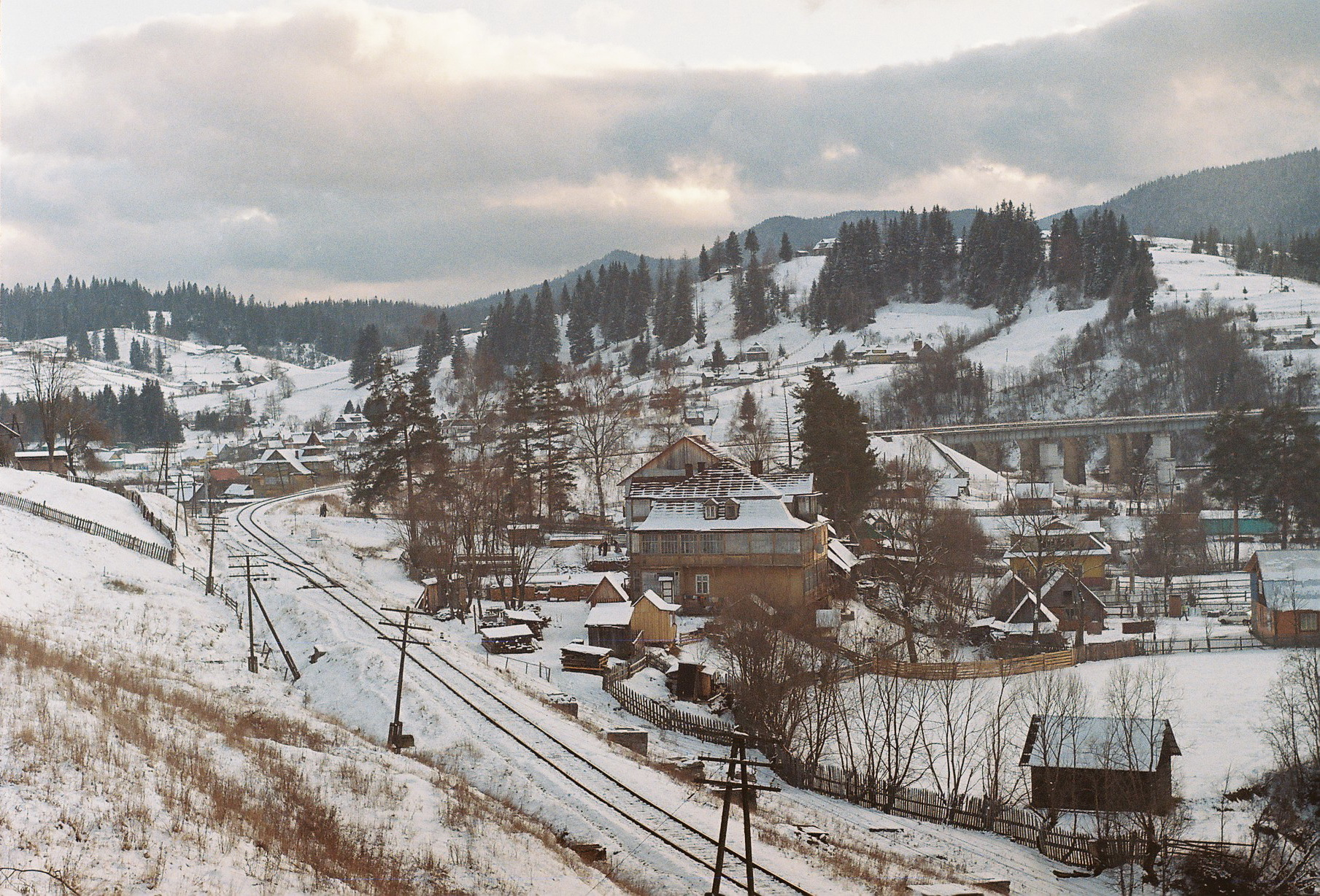
A railroad and a bridge (winter)

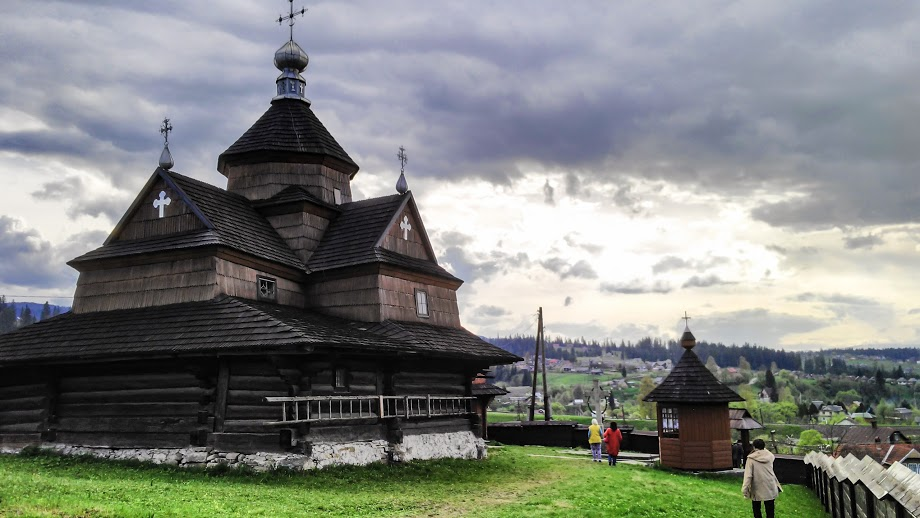
Church of the Nativity of the Virgin Mary

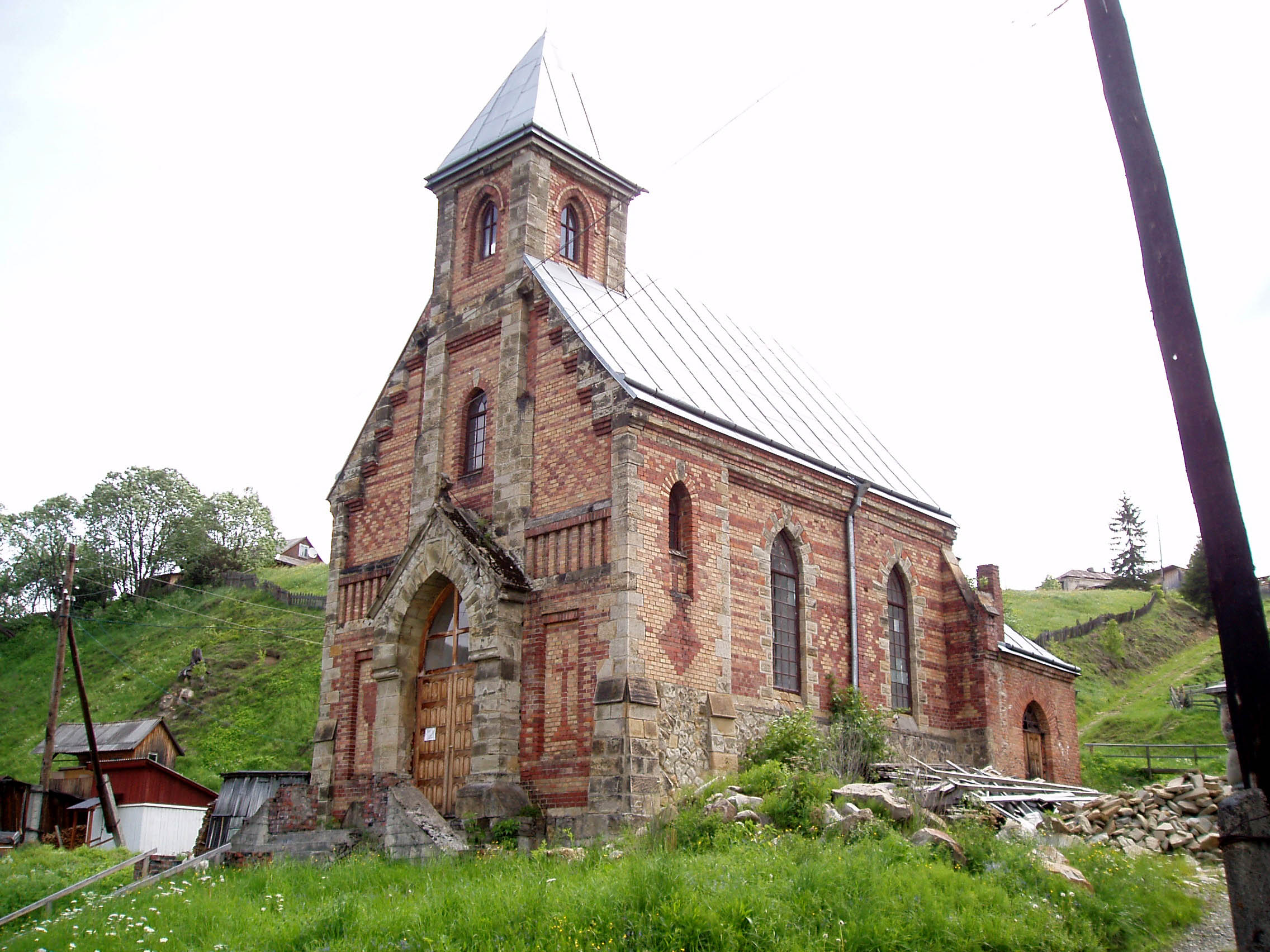
Church of the Assumption

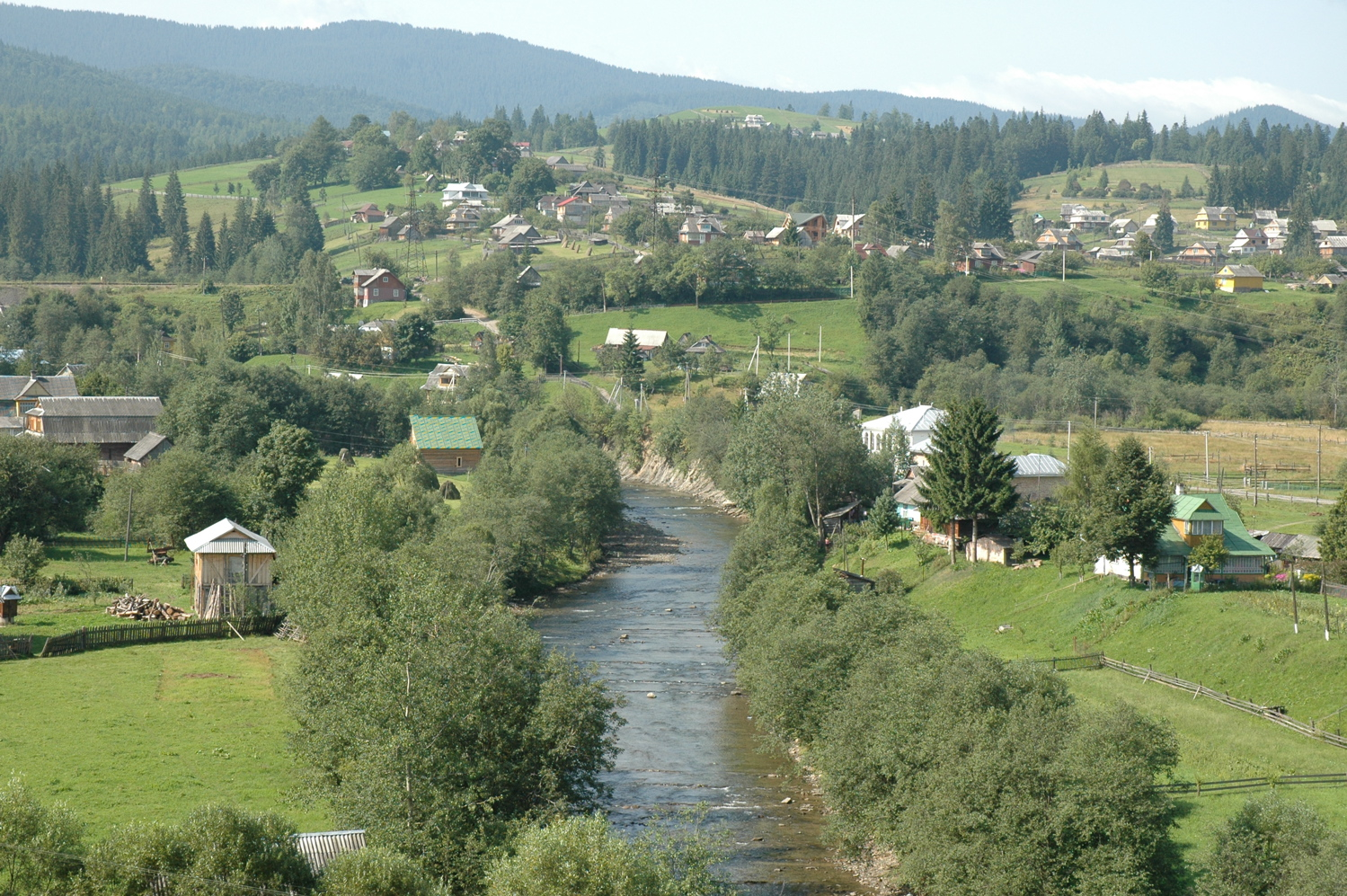
Prut River in Vorokhta

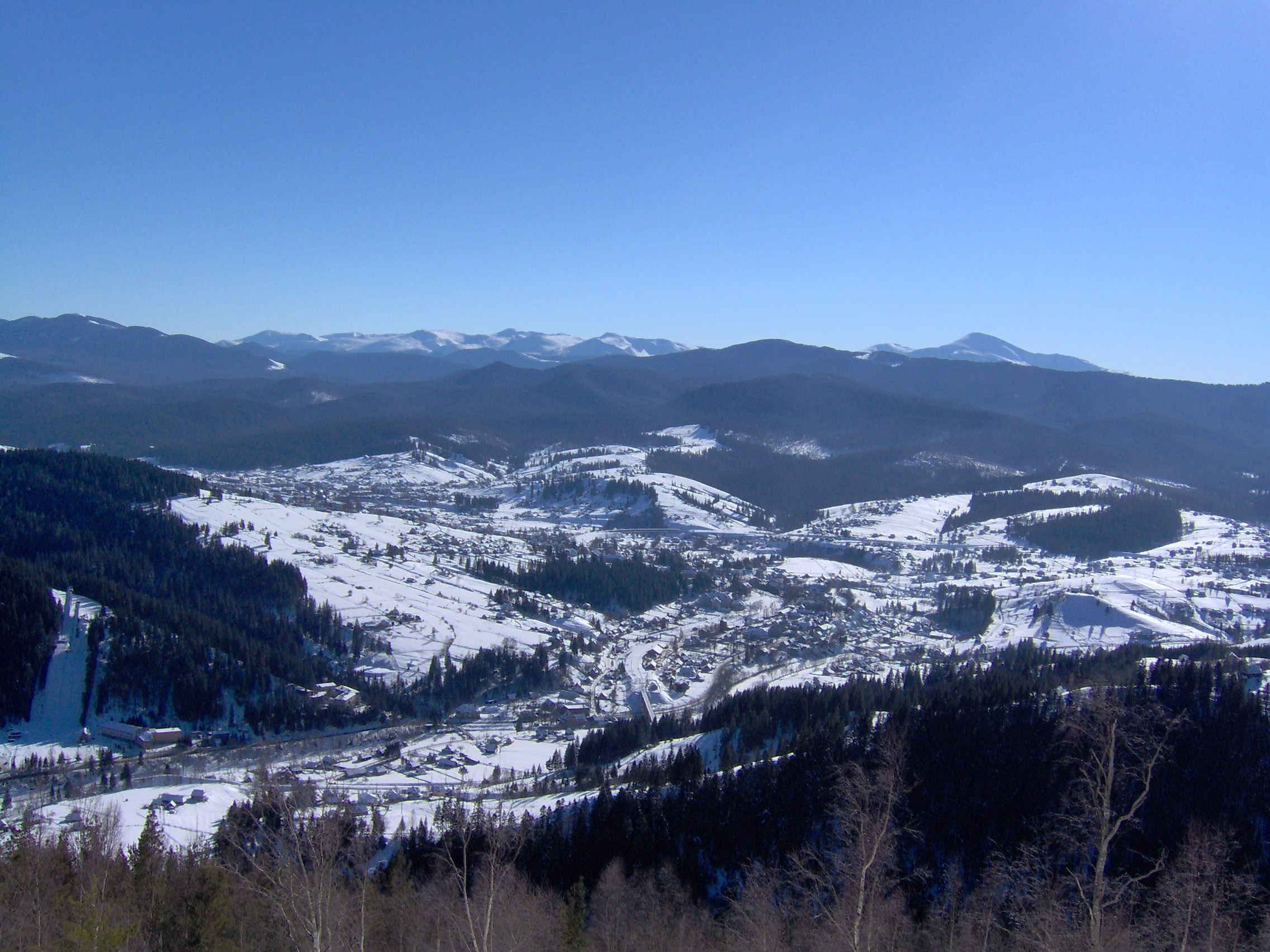
Vorokhta from Mahora mountain (winter, 2005)

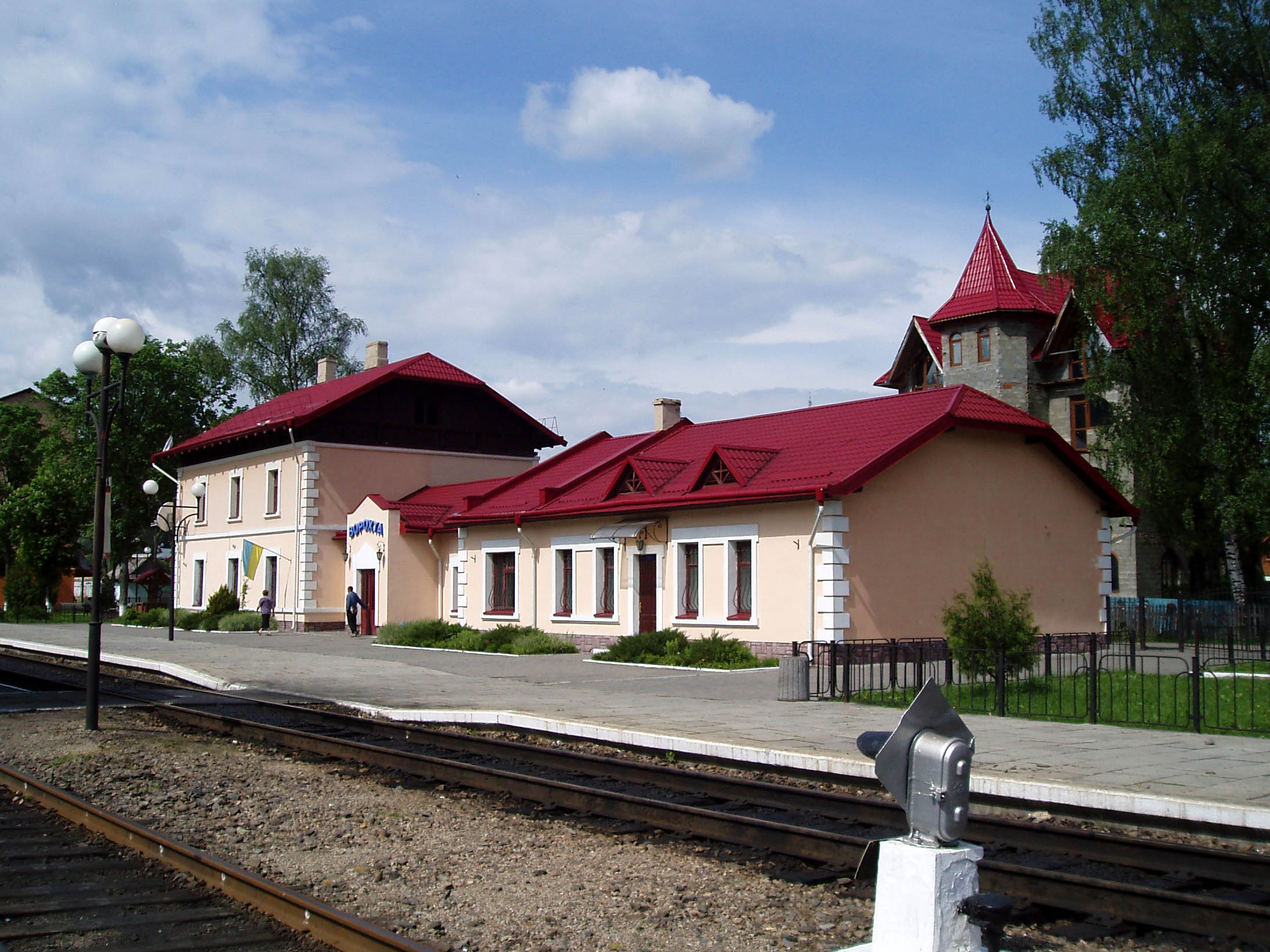
Vorokhta railway station

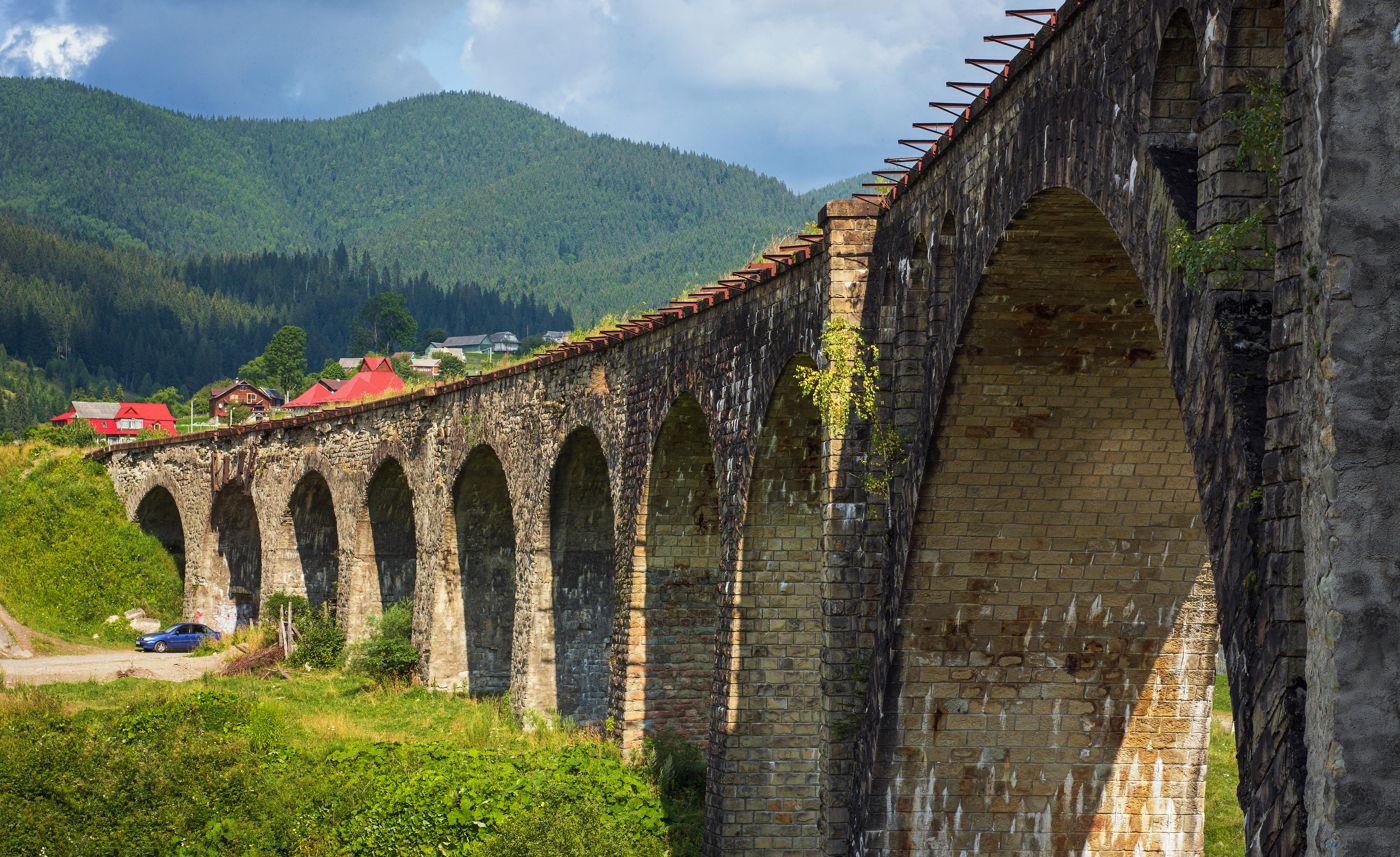
Railway viaduct
