= Voronenko =

Voronenko is a Ukrainian surname.

- Andrey Voronenko (born 1972), Russian mathematician
- Dmitry Voronenko, Kyrgyzstani-Ukrainian serial killer and rapist
