= Vorokhta settlement hromada =

Urban hromada of Ivano-Frankivsk Oblast, Ukraine

Vorokhta settlement hromada Ворохтянська селищна громада
- Hromada
- Interactive map of Vorokhta settlement hromada
- Country: Ukraine
- Oblast: Ivano-Frankivsk
- Raion: Nadvirna

Area
  - Total: 249.7 km^{2} (96.4 sq mi)

Population (2023)
  - Total: 5,616
  - Density: 22.49/km^{2} (58.25/sq mi)
- Settlements: 2
- Villages: 1
- Towns: 1
- Website: vorokhtianska-rada.gov.ua

Vorokhta settlement territorial hromada (Ukrainian: Ворохтянська селищна територіальна громада, romanized: Vorokhtianska selyshchna terytorialna hromada) is one of the hromadas of Ukraine, located within Ivano-Frankivsk Oblast's Nadvirna Raion. Its capital is the urban-type settlement of Vorokhta.

The hromada has a total population of 5,616 (as of 2023), as well as an area of 249.7 km^{2} (96.4 mi^{2}).

== Composition ==
In addition to one urban-type settlement, the hromada includes one village: Tatariv.
