= Polianytsia, Nadvirna Raion, Ivano-Frankivsk Oblast =

Village in Ivano-Frankivsk Oblast, Ukraine

Polianytsia Поляниця
- Village
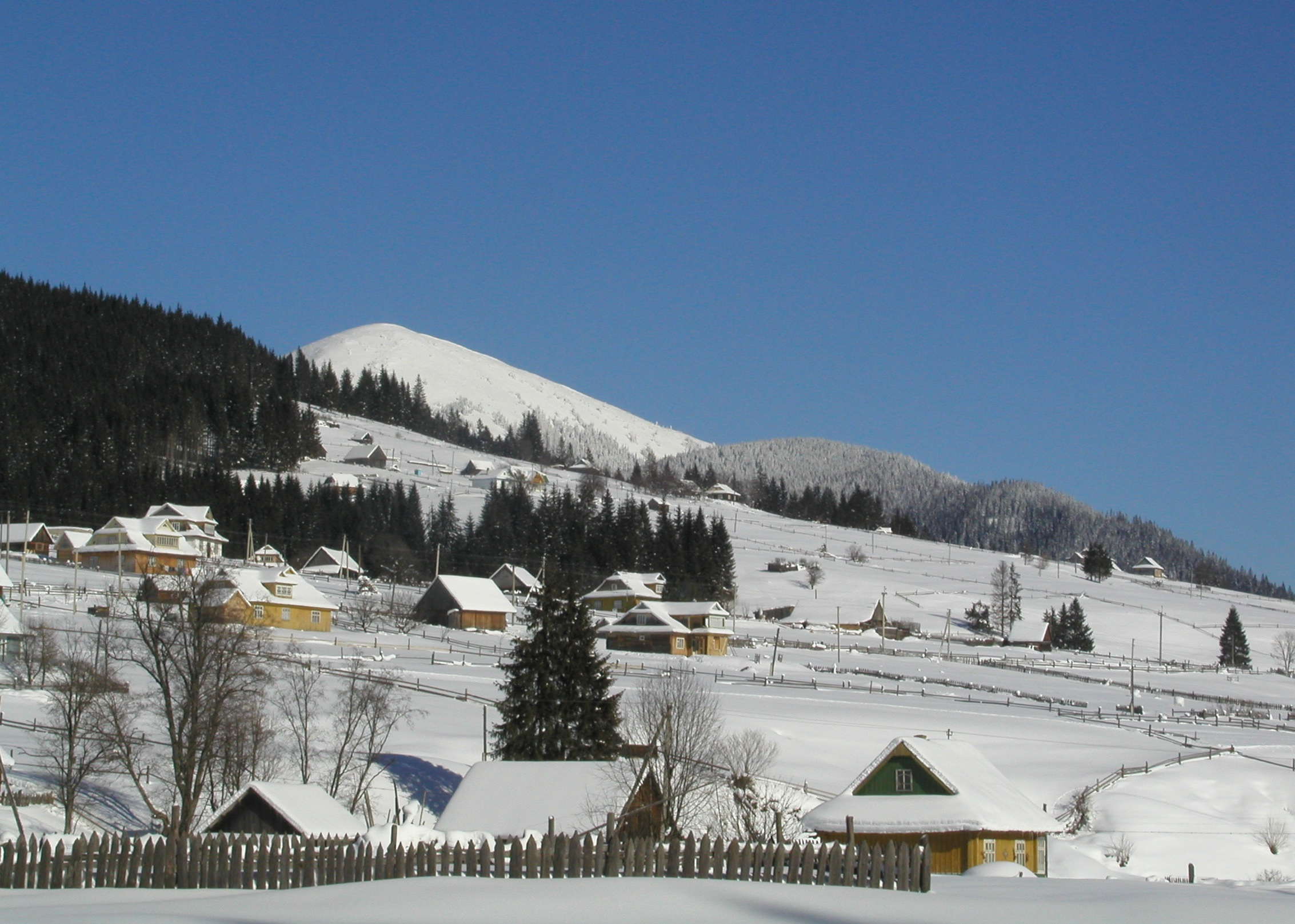

- Location of Polianytsia in Ivano-Frankivsk Oblast Location of Polianytsia in Ukraine
- Coordinates: 48°21′03″N 24°26′38″E
- Country: Ukraine
- Oblast: Ivano-Frankivsk Oblast
- Raion: Nadvirna Raion
- Hromada: Polianytsia rural hromada
- Established: 1943
- Elevation: 910 m (2,990 ft)

Population (2023)
  - Total: 615

Polianytsia (Note: Prior to 2002 known as Palianytsia (Ukrainian: Паляниця).) (Ukrainian: Поляниця; Polish: Polanica) is a village in Nadvirna Raion, Ivano-Frankivsk Oblast, Ukraine. It is the administrative centre of the Polianytsia rural hromada. Its population is 615 As of 2023.

== History ==
The village of Polianytsia was first mentioned in 1820. During the early 20th century, the village was developed at the behest of Johann II, Prince of Liechtenstein, who owned several properties within the village. A church was built under his supervision in 1912. During World War II, the church, along with the village's school, was destroyed by German forces, and 40 of the town's 300 pre-war residents remained in the village by the war's end. The village is inhabited by ethnic Hutsuls.

The village is home to the Bukovel ski resort.
