= Vorokhta railway station =

Railway station in Ukraine

Vorokhta Ворохта
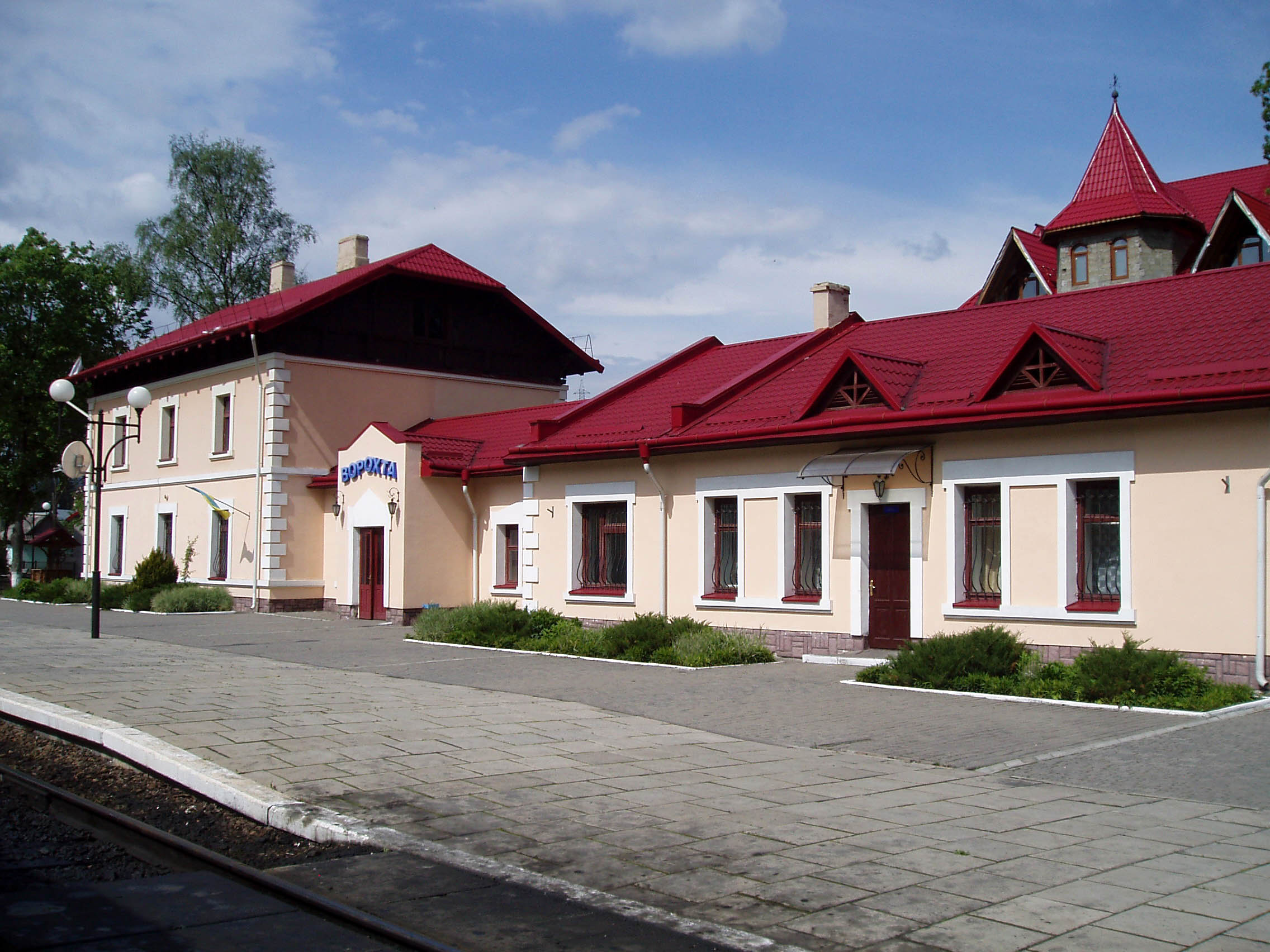
- Station building (June 2012)

General information
- Coordinates: 48.2933°N 24.5647°E
- Owner: Ukrzaliznytsia
- Operator: Lviv Railways
- Platforms: 1 (main platform), 1 (island platform)
- Tracks: 3

Construction
- Structure type: At-grade

Other information
- Station code: 386502
- Fare zone: Ivano-Frankivsk Administration

Services
Preceding station	Lviv Railways	Following station
Tatariv	Lviv Railways	Voronenka
Location

Vorokhta (Ukrainian: Ворохта) is a railway station that is located in town of Vorokhta, Ivano-Frankivsk Oblast in Ukraine. It is part of the Ivano-Frankivsk administration (Lviv Railways). The station is located next to the town's center and situated on a segment between Deliatyn and Dilove (Zakarpattia Oblast) which is next to the border with Romania.

== Overview ==
The station has two platforms (one island platform) allowing embarkment of passengers onto two trains simultaneously. Three tracks that stretch along the station leave extra room for easy passing. Among notable railroad infrastructure in the area are bridges, one over the Prut River and another pedestrian over rail tracks at the north end of the station. To south of the station towards Rakhiv, there is a railway crossing with barrier.

Among other major rail infrastructures in the area is an old stone railroad bridge that was built in 1884 when the railroad was first installed in the area. Stretching also over the Prut River right next to the newly installed bridge, it is in poor conditions and overgrown with vegetation (48.2813°N 24.5644°E).

The station is most often served by the D1 multiple unit. There is also a railbus Ivano-Frankivsk - Vorokhta that is served by a Polish manufactured train PESA. Among services provided at the station are embarkment and disembarkment of passengers and cargo for commuter and regional lines. Sale of tickets on all trains is available on site. There is also a ramp for loading and unloading of vehicles onto a train. The local wood processing factory has an access for loading and unloading. There is an abandoned and unused branching off onto a narrow gauge railroad.

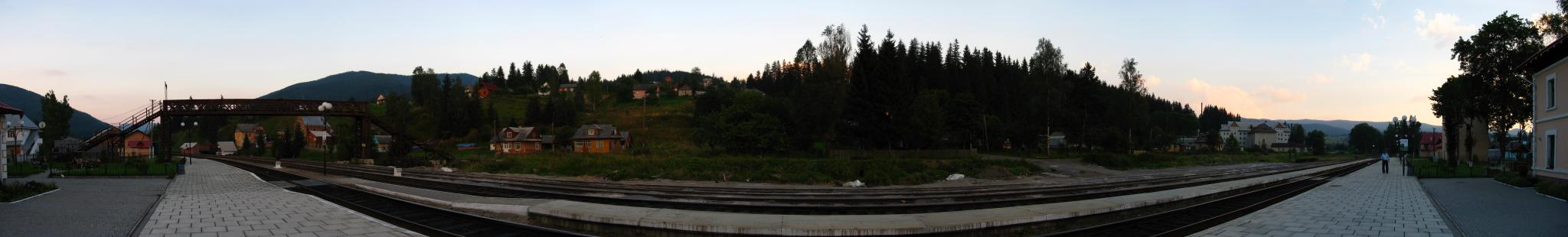
View from the main platform (October 2009)
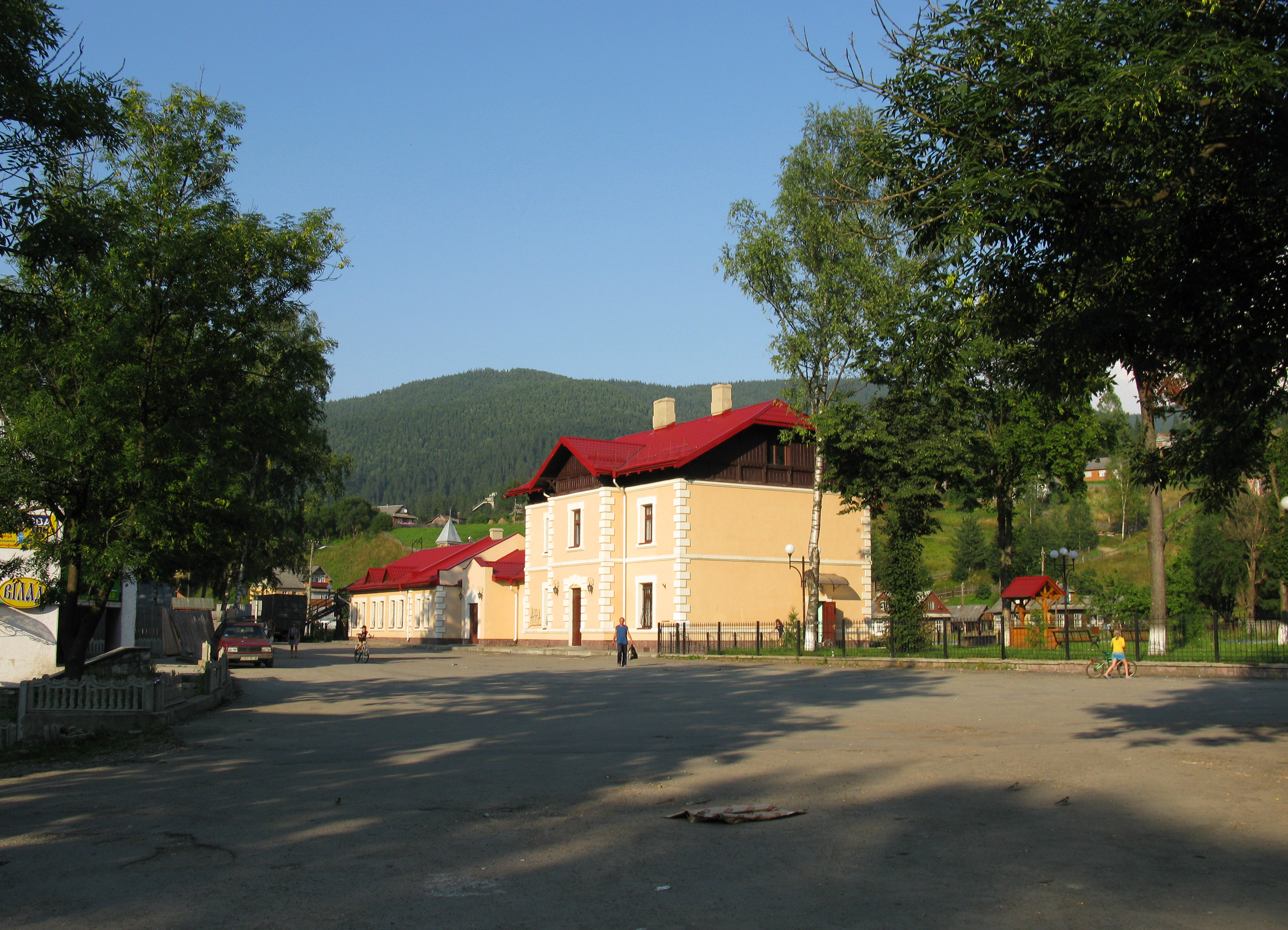
Station view from town (August 2008)

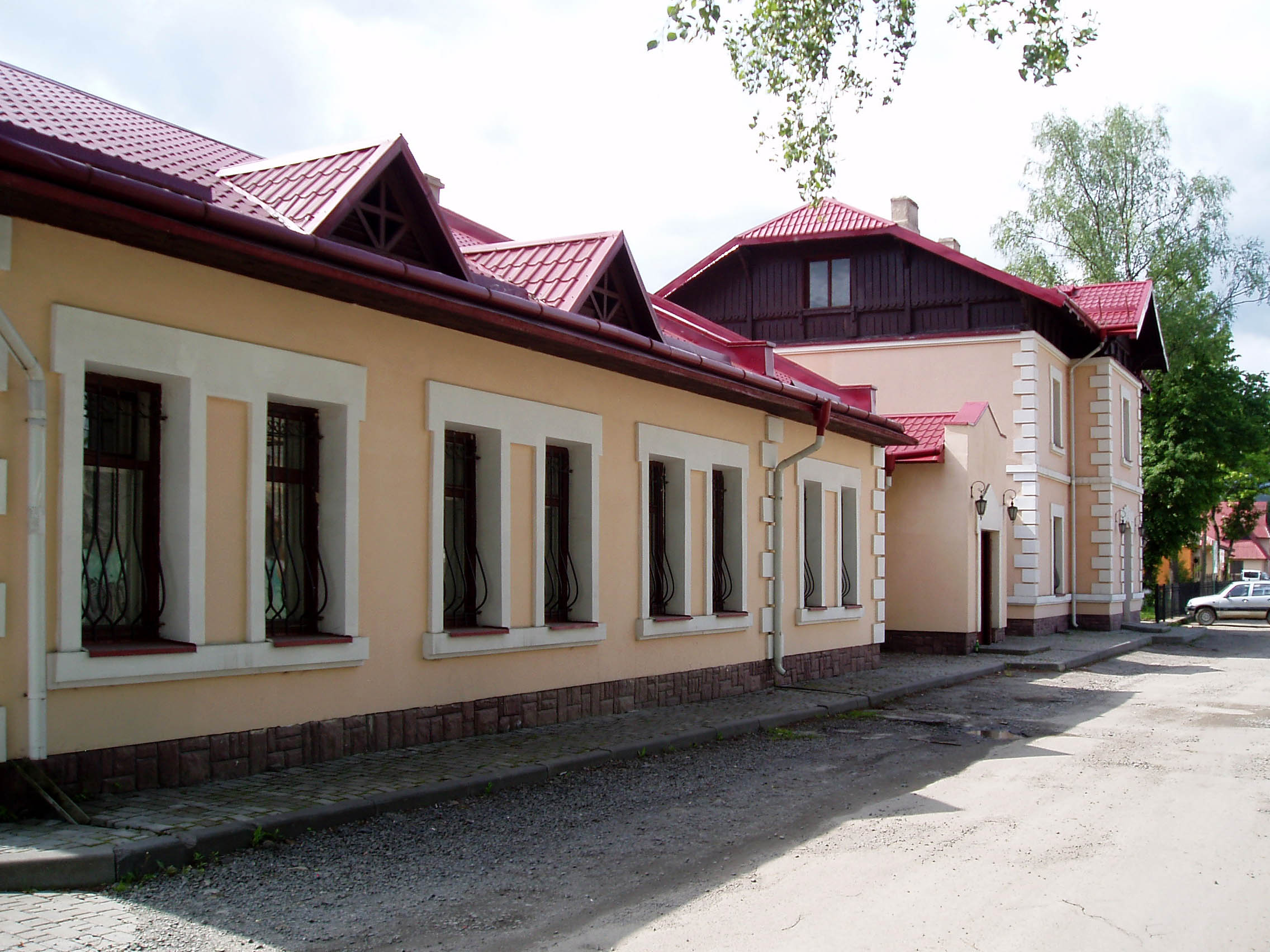
Station view from town (close up, June 2012)

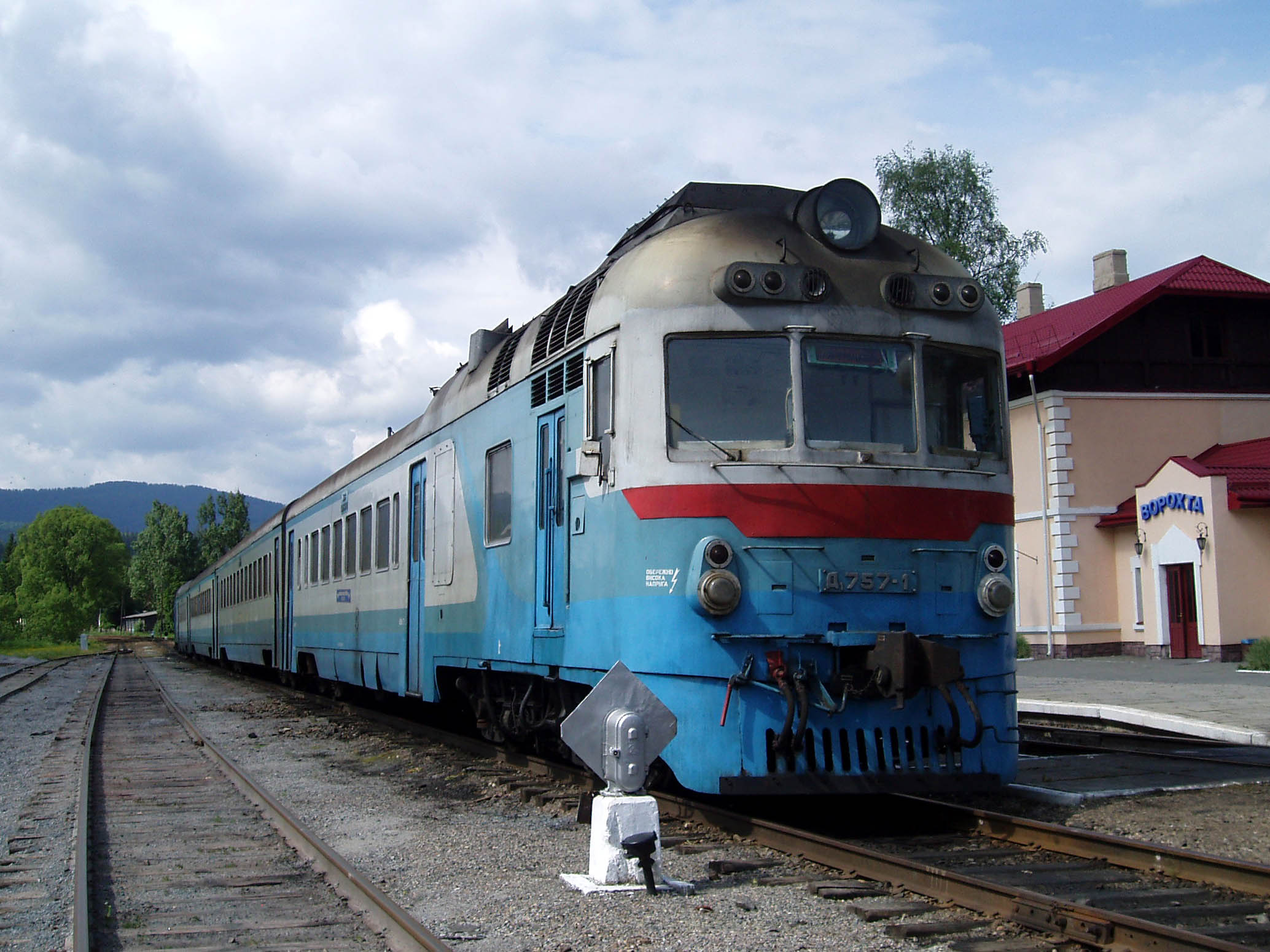
D1 DMU train at island platform (June 2012)
