= Leifer =

Leifer is a surname. Notable people with the surname include:

- Andrew Michael Leifer, ISEF awardee in 2003, after whom main-belt asteroid 18826 Leifer is named
- Avraham Abba Leifer (1918–1990), a rabbi in Pittsburgh, Pennsylvania
- Carol Leifer (born 1956), an American comedian
- Debbie Leifer, an American magician
- Elmer Leifer (1893–1948), a baseball player for the Chicago White Sox
- Michael Leifer (1933–2001), a British International Relations scholar
- Mordechai Yissachar Ber Leifer, a rabbi in Pittsburgh, Pennsylvania
- Neil Leifer (born 1942), an American photographer and filmmaker
- Teddy Leifer (Edward Leifer) film producer and founder of RISE Films
- Yosef Leifer (1891–1966), a rabbi in Pittsburgh, Pennsylvania
