= Meshulam Eliezer Leifer =

Israeli Rebbe

Meshulam Eliezer Leifer משולם אליעזר לייפער
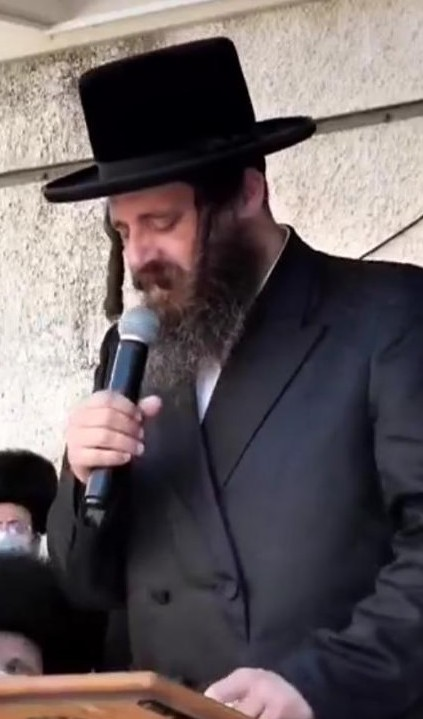
- Leifer in October 2020
- Title: Fourth Pittsburgher Rebbe

Personal life
- Born: Meshulam Eliezer Leifer; January 23, 1979 (age 47) United States
- Parents: Mordechai Yissachar Ber Leifer (father); Miriam Aviva Liebes (mother)
- Dynasty: Pittsburgh

Religious life
- Religion: Judaism

Jewish leader
- Predecessor: Mordechai Yissachar Ber Leifer
- Dynasty: Pittsburgh

Meshulam Eliezer Leifer (Hebrew: משולם אליעזר לייפער; born January 23, 1979) is the fourth Rebbe of the Pittsburgh Hasidic dynasty. He succeeded his father, Grand Rabbi Mordechai Yissachar Ber Leifer, upon the latter's death in October 2020.

== Early life, family, and education ==
Meshulam Eliezer Leifer was born on January 23, 1979, in the United States. He is the eldest of the three sons of the third Pittsburgher Rebbe, Grand Rabbi Mordechai Yissachar Ber Leifer, and his wife Miriam Aviva Leifer (née Liebes). He has five sisters. He was named after Rabbi Meshulam Yissachar Klieger of Kraków, the father-in-law of his maternal grandfather; the name Eliezer (after Rabbi Meshulam Yissachar's father-in-law, Rabbi Eliezer Pesil, a Dzhikover Hasid) was added since Rabbi Meshulam Yissachar had died young in the Holocaust.

Leifer is a direct descendant of Rabbi Mordechai of Nadvorna, the founder of the Nadvorna dynasty, who was the great-grandson of Grand Rabbi Meir the Great of Premishlan, a disciple of the Baal Shem Tov. His paternal great-grandfather, Grand Rabbi Yosef Leifer, established the Pittsburgh Hasidic dynasty in Pittsburgh, Pennsylvania, in the late 1920s, and his grandfather, Grand Rabbi Avraham Abba Leifer, moved the Hasidut to Ashdod, Israel, in 1970.

His family immigrated to Israel in the early 1980s. They first lived in Telzstone, where Leifer attended a Talmud Torah. After they moved to Ashdod to be near his grandfather in 1987, Leifer attended a Belz Talmud Torah in that city. Following his Bar Mitzvah, he advanced to the Chug Chasam Sofer yeshiva in Bnei Brak. His father acceded to the leadership of the Hasidut in 1990.

== Early career ==
Leifer was considered his father's "right-hand man" and confidant. He assisted his father in the management and funding of all the Pittsburgher institutions in Ashdod, which include schools, yeshivas, and charitable institutions. The Pittsburgher Hasidut numbers nearly 200 families in Ashdod, and also has followers in Jerusalem, Bnei Brak, Beit Hilkia, New York City, and California. In the 2010s, Leifer began working with young men who were weak in their faith, strengthening them and drawing them closer to Torah and Hasidut.

Leifer is considered a significant scholar of Torah and Hasidut, and is versed in mussar works as well. He has authored several books on Hasidut and the history of spiritual leaders throughout the generations. He also edited and proofread his father's writings before their publication.

== As Rebbe ==
Leifer was appointed to succeed his father as Pittsburger Rebbe at the latter's funeral on October 5, 2020.

== Personal life ==
Leifer is currently married to the daughter of the Kretshnif–Jerusalem Rebbe. His eldest son (from a previous marriage), Rabbi Yekusiel Yehudah Leifer, is the son-in-law of the Spinka Rebbe of Monsey, New York.
