= Mordechai Yissachar Ber Leifer =

American rabbi

Mordechai Yissachar Ber Leifer מרדכי יששכר בער לייפער
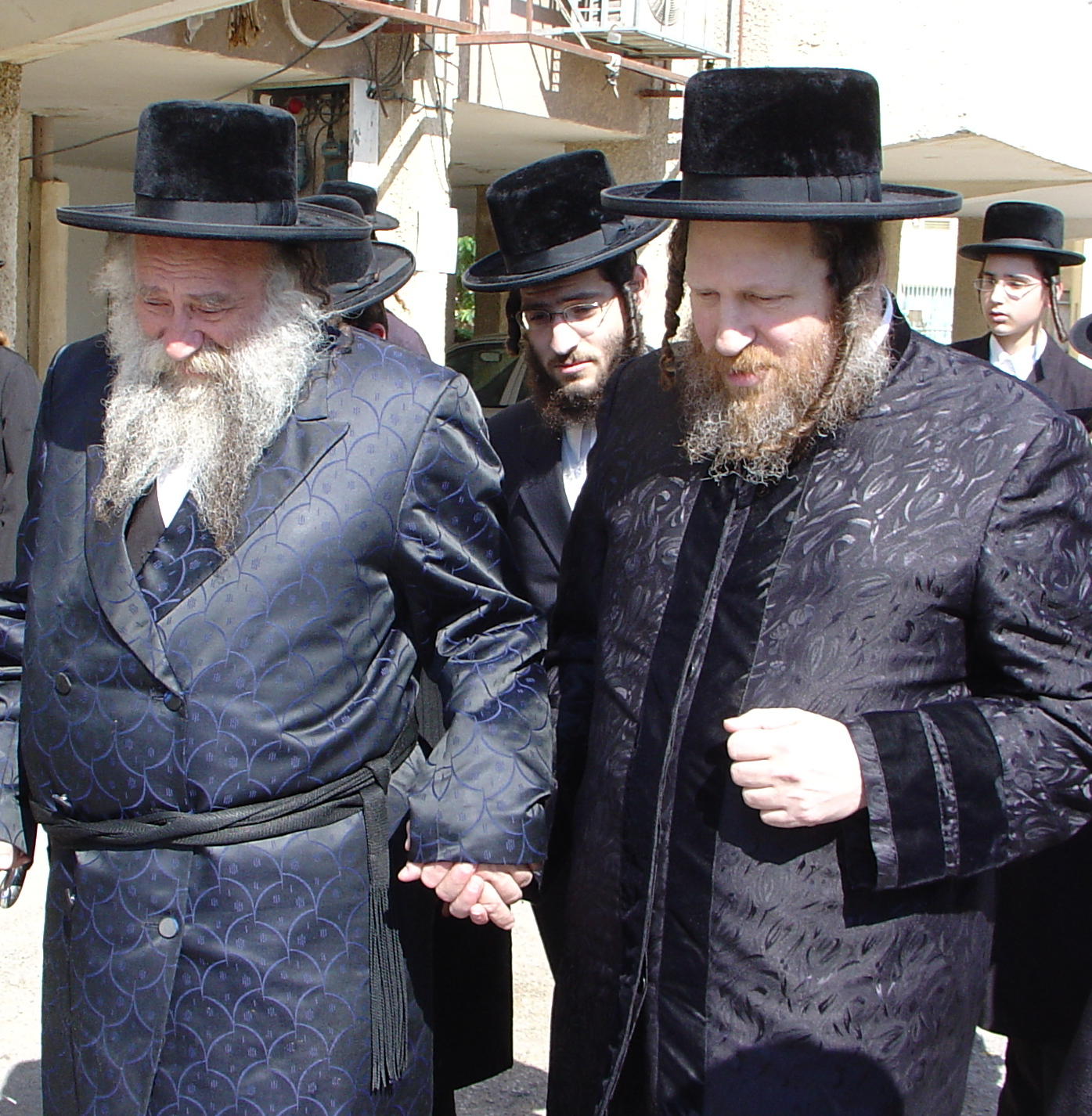
- Grand Rabbi Mordechai Yissachar Ber Leifer (right) with Grand Rabbi Shmuel Shmelke Leifer of Chust (US), 2006
- Title: Third Pittsburgher Rebbe

Personal life
- Born: Mordechai Yissachar Ber Leifer; 31 December, 1955 Newark, New Jersey, US
- Died: October 4, 2020 (aged 64) Netanya, Israel
- Buried: Ashdod, Israel
- Spouse: Miriam Aviva Liebes
- Parents: Avraham Abba Leifer (father); Rachel Rosenbaum (mother)
- Dynasty: Pittsburgh

Religious life
- Religion: Judaism

Jewish leader
- Predecessor: Avraham Abba Leifer
- Successor: Meshulam Eliezer Leifer
- Main work: Pisgamei Oraisa
- Yahrtzeit: 17 Tishrei 5781
- Dynasty: Pittsburgh

Mordechai Yissachar Ber Leifer (Hebrew: מרדכי יששכר בער לייפער; 31 December 1955 – 4 October 2020) was the third Rebbe of the Pittsburgh Hasidic dynasty. Born in the United States, he joined his father, Grand Rabbi Avraham Abba Leifer, in Ashdod, Israel, to serve as rosh yeshiva of a new Pittsburgher yeshiva in that city in 1981. After succeeding his father as Rebbe, he expanded the Hasidic presence in Ashdod with new schools and institutions, and increased the number of Pittsburgher families to nearly 200 in Ashdod. He also shepherded Pittsburgher Hasidim in Jerusalem, Bnei Brak, Beit Hilkia, New York City, and California. An accomplished Torah scholar and musical composer, he led the Hasidut for three decades until his death in 2020.

== Early life and family ==
Mordechai Yissachar Ber Leifer was born in Newark, New Jersey in 1955. He was the son of Grand Rabbi Avraham Abba Leifer and the grandson of Grand Rabbi Yosef Leifer, a scion of the Nadvorna Hasidic dynasty who founded the Hasidut in Pittsburgh, Pennsylvania, in 1924. His mother Rachel Rosenbaum was the daughter of Rabbi Itamar Rosenbaum, Admor of Nadvorna. Leifer traced his paternal ancestry to Rabbi Mordechai of Nadvorna, the founder of the Nadvorna dynasty, who was the great-grandson of Grand Rabbi Meir the Great of Premishlan, a disciple of the Baal Shem Tov.

At the time of his birth, his father was teaching Torah and Hasidut and eventually founded a Hasidic yeshiva in Newark.

In 1966, after the death of his grandfather, who served the Pittsburgh, Pennsylvania, religious community for more than four decades, Leifer's father accepted the invitation of the Pittsburgh congregation to succeed his father as Rebbe. In 1970, his father moved to Ashdod, Israel. Leifer studied in the Grodno yeshiva in Ashdod and the Tchebin yeshiva in Jerusalem. He also studied in the Telshe Yeshiva in Cleveland, Ohio. And in the Lakewood Yeshiva.

In 1981, his father opened a yeshiva in Ashdod and asked Leifer to come to Israel and serve as rosh yeshiva. When his father died on January 6, 1990 (10 Tevet 5750), Leifer acceded to the leadership of the Pittsburgher Hasidim. He was 34 years old when he accepted the mantle of leadership.

== Activities as Rebbe ==
Leifer presided over the Pittsburgh educational system which includes a cheder with over 300 students, two yeshivas with 90 students, and kollels for halakha, Gemara, early-morning learning, and a night kollel for married men. He also established charitable institutions in the city, which earned him a special commendation as "Worthy Citizen of Ashdod" from Mayor Yehiel Lasri.

By the time of his death, Leifer had increased the number of Pittsburgher families in Ashdod to nearly 200. The Hasidut attracted formerly non-observant Jews through Leifer's shiurim (classes), tishen and personal interaction.

Like his father before him, Leifer conducted exuberant tishen on Friday nights and after the Shabbat morning meal, as well as a Seudah Shlishit which goes late into the night accompanied by the Rebbe's words of mussar. The Hasidut is also famous for its heartfelt niggunim, many of which Leifer composed. He composed some of these niggunim during the tish itself, such as the melody for "She'yifkedunu b'rachamim" (Hebrew: שיפקדונו ברחמים, "He should remember us with mercy"). The niggunim are sung both within the Hasidut and at the tishen of other Rebbes, and have been recorded on musical albums. In total, Leifer composed more than 250 melodies, many of them pertinent to the synagogue prayer service, especially the Hallel on Rosh Chodesh and Yom Tov.

== Personal life and death ==
Leifer married Aviva Miriam Liebes, the daughter of Rabbi Yitzchak Eizik Liebes, av beis din of the Iggud HaRabbanim (Rabbinical Alliance) of America. The couple had three sons and six daughters; one of their daughters died at a young age.

For the first six months of the COVID-19 pandemic in Israel, Leifer stayed close to home and strictly adhered to Ministry of Health guidelines. He contracted the COVID-19 virus after leaving his home for the first time in August. He was admitted to Laniado Hospital in Netanya on August 15. He died on October 4, aged 64.

His funeral took place in Ashdod on October 5. The funeral was attended by an estimated 5,000 people, more than 10 times the number of participants that organizers had estimated for police who were sent to enforce compliance with Ministry of Health regulations during the coronavirus pandemic. Attempting to set up barricades to disperse the large crowd, police were videoed shoving and wrestling with mourners.

At the funeral, Leifer's eldest son Rabbi Meshulam Eliezer Leifer was announced as his successor. His son Rabbi Yaakov Leifer was appointed rosh yeshiva of the Hasidut's yeshiva network and his son Rabbi Yosef Leifer was named Rav of the Pittsburgher community in Bnei Brak.

== Published works ==
The Rebbe's Torah discourses have been published in two volumes, covering the years 1990 through 2010, under the title Pisgamei Oraisa–Shabbos (Hebrew: פתגמי אורייתא-שבת). This series also includes ten volumes of Leifer's discourses on the weekly Torah portion and Jewish holidays.

== Rebbes of Pittsburgh ==
1. Yosef Leifer (1924–1966)
2. Avraham Abba Leifer (1966–1990)
3. Mordechai Yissachar Ber Leifer (1990–2020)
4. Meshulam Eliezer Leifer (2020– )
