= Carei =

Carei Nagykároly
- Municipality
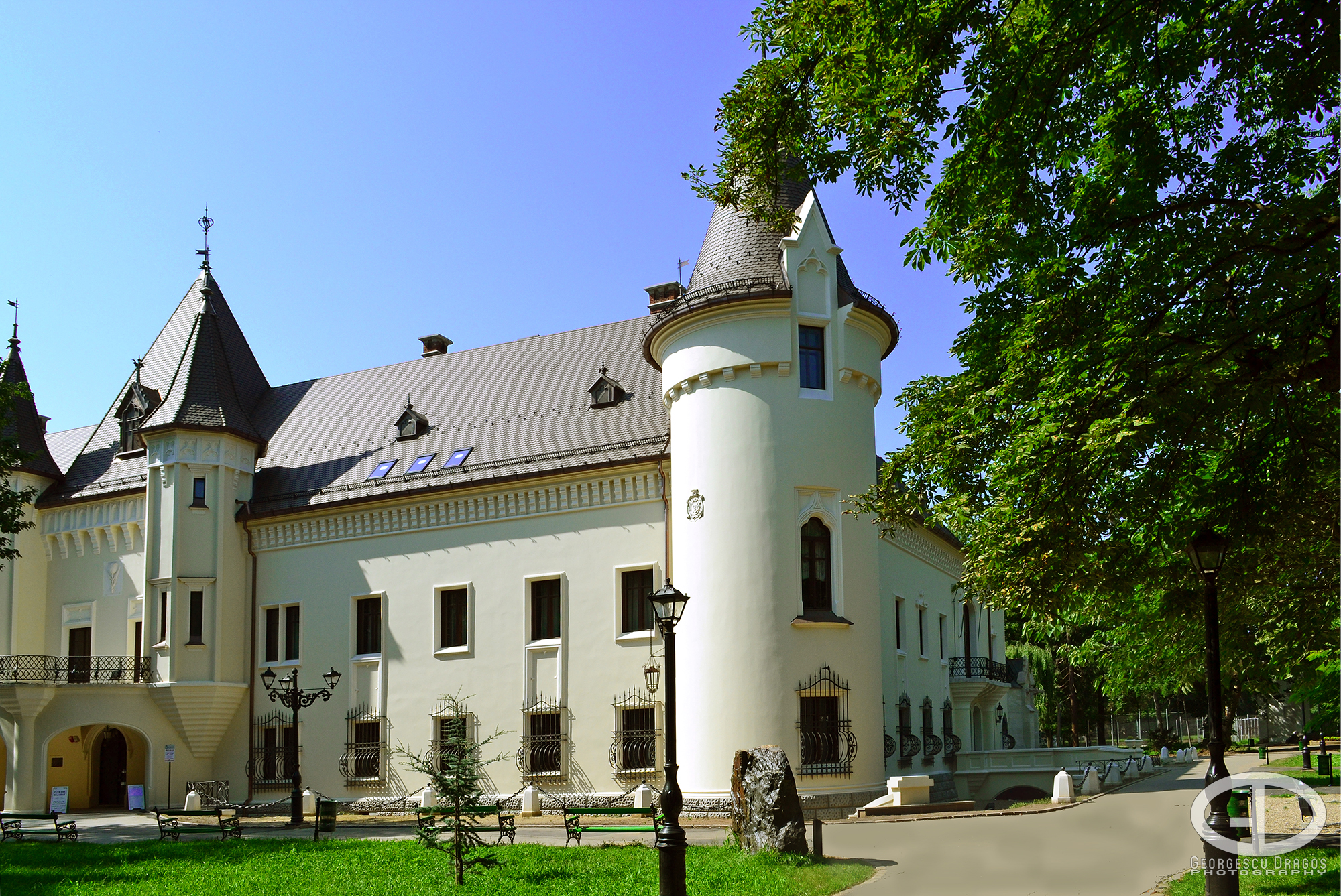
- The Károlyi Castle in Carei

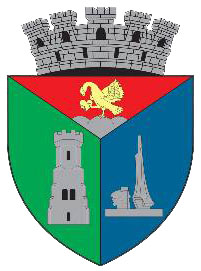
- Flag Coat of arms

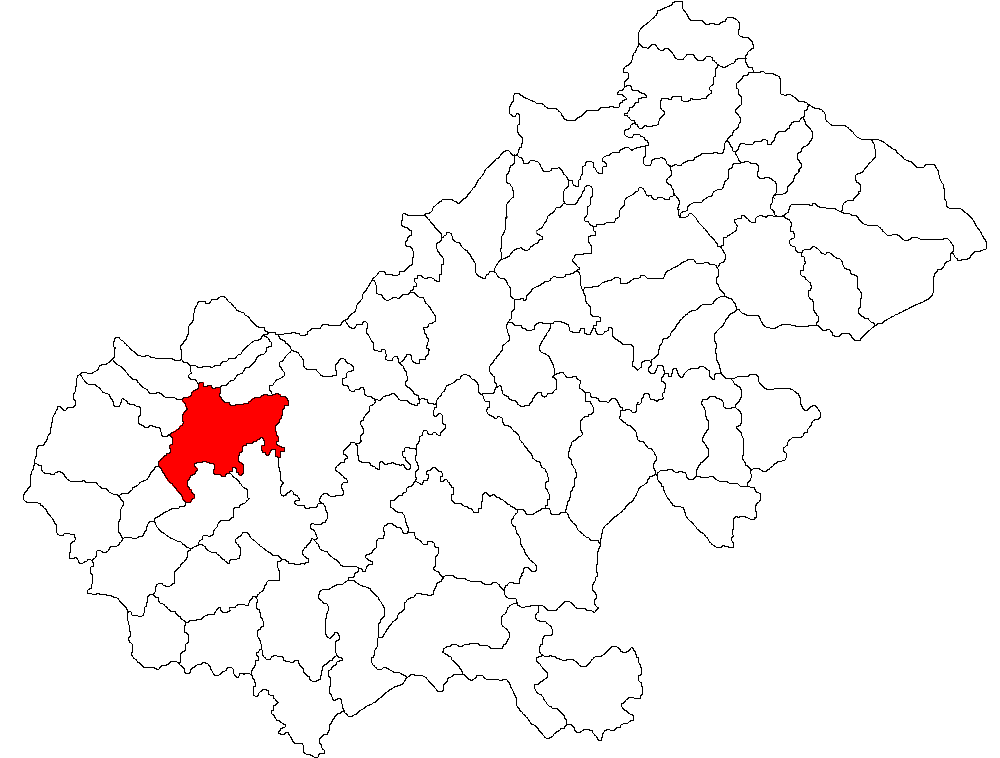
- Location in Satu Mare County

- Location in Romania
- Coordinates: 47°41′2″N 22°28′1″E
- Country: Romania
- County: Satu Mare
- Established: 1264; Incorporated: 1717

Government
  - Mayor (2024–2028): Monica-Silvia Giurgiu-Kovács (UDMR)
- Area: 102 km^{2} (39 sq mi)
- Elevation: 160 m (520 ft)
- Population (2021-12-01): 18,957
  - Density: 186/km^{2} (481/sq mi)
- Time zone: UTC+02:00 (EET)
  - Summer (DST): UTC+03:00 (EEST)
- Postal code: 445100
- Area code: +(40) 02 61
- Vehicle reg.: SM
- Website: www.municipiulcarei.ro

Carei (Romanian pronunciation: [kaˈrej]; Hungarian: Nagykároly, Hungarian pronunciation: [ˈnɒckaːroj]; German: Grosskarol/Großkarl, Yiddish: קראלי, pronounced [krʊlə]) is a city in Satu Mare County, northwestern Romania, near the border with Hungary. The city administers one village, Ianculești (Hungarian: Szentjánosmajor).

== Geography ==
The municipality of Carei is situated in the north-west of Romania, 99 km (62 mi) away from Oradea. Carei is situated in the south-western part of Satu-Mare County, in a plain region, and it is 35 km (22 mi) away from the county seat, Satu-Mare. Communes that are near Carei include Căpleni, Urziceni, Foieni, Sanislău, Petrești, Tiream, Căuaș, and Moftin.

== History ==
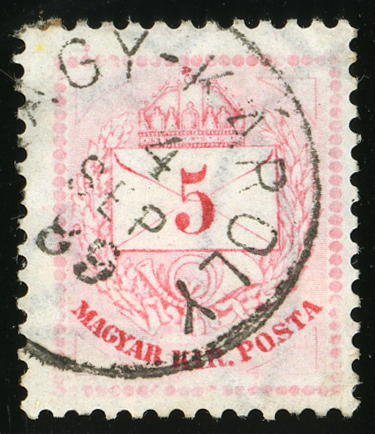
Kingdom of Hungary stamp, cancelled NAGY-KÁROLY in 1889

The first mention of the city under the name of "Karul" dates from 1320, and as "Károly" in 1325, however, the city is known to have existed since 1264, as it was the domain of the Kaplony clan and the center of the Károlyi family's personal domain that settled in the region shortly after the arrival of the Hungarians. The name of the city comes from the word "karul" (in modern Hungarian "karvaly"). The etymology of the word can be traced back to the ancient Turkish language, the word meaning Eurasian sparrowhawk. Another theory is that the city was named after the Károlyi family.

King Louis I of Hungary permitted the organization of weekly market gatherings on Saturdays in Carei in 1346, as a result of the military achievements of the Károlyi family. The development of regional trade in the region stimulated the development of the town, and in 1387, King Sigismund elevates the town to county center, while also granting it independent jurisdiction.

In 1482, Ladislaus Károlyi, with the permission of King Matthias, begins the construction of a stone residence. Over the course of the following decades, due to fears of an Ottoman attack, the residence will gradually get transformed into a fortification outfitted with a moat, four corner bastions and shooting niches for cannons.

After the Battle of Mohács in 1526, the town falls under the Eastern Hungarian Kingdom (after 1570 the Principality of Transylvania), a vassal state of the Ottoman Empire, and in the ensuing struggle between the Habsburg Ferdinand I and John Zápolya for the crown of Hungary, the Karolyi family initially sides with Zápolya, and Ferdinand confiscates their holdings in 1558, however, he reinstates them to power later. By 1554, the city was converted to Protestantism, and by 1567 it adhered to the Calvinist faith. In 1590, a synod takes place in the city, protesting the adoption of the Gregorian calendar in Hungary. Additional synods take place in 1591 and 1594, and the city is the birthplace of Gáspár Károli, who is the first person to translate the Bible into Hungarian in 1586.

In 1592, the baron, Mihály Károlyi, further expands the fortifications of the city, these being made out of predominantly dirt. However, after an Ottoman response, the city is forced to keep paying tribute. Thanks to its strategic position, the city becomes part of a series of fortifications built against the Ottomans, and to be able of repelling the eventual attacks, the fortifications are enlarged again between 1661 and 1666, as well as a German garrison with artillery being assigned. However, after a series of attacks, the city is burned and suffers grave damage, but is eventually rebuilt by the year 1678.

The city will once again come under fire during Francis II Rákóczi's uprising, and the city will be depopulated and left impoverished. The city will have a resurgence after Treaty of Szatmár is signed and the Károlyi family is elevated to the status of counts. Count Alexander Karolyi, shortly after the war, begins colonizing the region with Swabians, inviting 124 families from Württemberg. Eventually Slovaks, Jews, and Rusyns also get settled in the regions. The colonization efforts become more significant during Francis Károlyi tenure, an additional 132 families are settled in 1762, with the total number reaching an estimated 466 Swabian families, forming two districts in the town. Effects on cultural and social life began to show: in 1727 the Piarist Gymnasium was established, in 1754 the first typography was built, and in 1756 a pharmacy was opened.

In 1780, the city became the seat of Szatmár County, and in 1828 the population reached 11,000. The town was hit by an earthquake in 1834, and the majority of the city was destroyed the next year during a great fire, which destroyed 350 houses. The city was hit by a similar great fire on 6 May 1887, causing similar damage to the fire from 1835. The rebuilding of the houses and the organizing of the streets were done according to the planning regulations adopted by the town's council, and they still define the physiognomy of the city's center today. In 1871, the railway connecting Carei to Satu Mare and Debrecen was opened, and it was further expanded in 1887 with the line Tășnad-Sărmășag-Zalău, and in 1905 the railway towards Mátészalka was built. Over the course of the 19th century, the colonized families started adopting the Hungarian language but kept their religion, differentiating them from the reformed majority of the county.

In 1845, with help from count György Károlyi, a hospital was built and opened. With the new railway built in 1887, the light industry and the food industry in the city started blooming, and a new paper mill was also built. Between the years 1893 and 1896, at the behest of count Stephen Károlyi, the castle underwent change once more, according to the plans of the architect Arthur Meinig, and it reached its current form. In 1904, electricity was introduced in the city, and until 1914, multiple elementary and general schools were opened, the most renowned being the Piarist school, today known as Școală Gimnazială Vasile Lucaciu (the Vasile Lucaciu school). In 1910, the train station was built, and it still exists today.

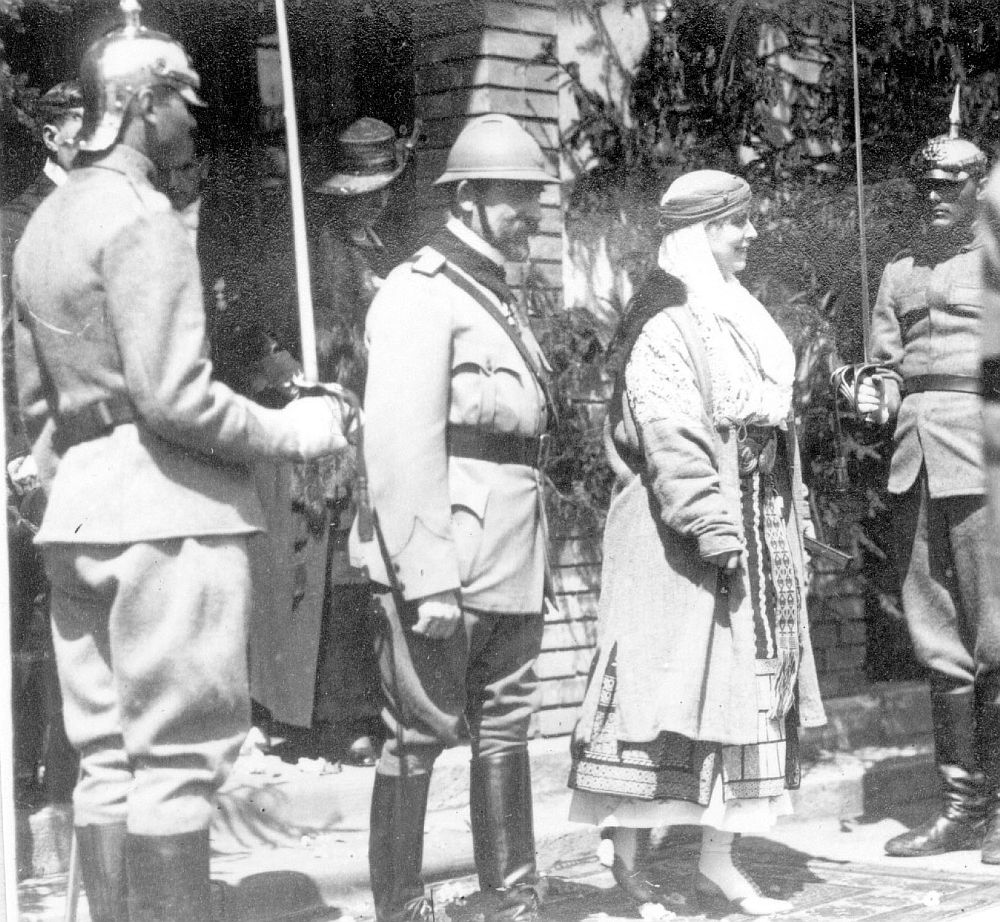
King Ferdinand I and Queen Marie of Romania departing Carei in 1919, during the Hungarian–Romanian War

After the collapse of Austria-Hungary at the end of World War I, and the declaration of the Union of Transylvania with Romania, the Romanian Army took control of Carei on 19 April 1919, during the Hungarian–Romanian War. The city officially became part of the territory ceded to the Kingdom of Romania in June 1920 under the terms of the Treaty of Trianon. In August 1940, under the auspices of Nazi Germany, which imposed the Second Vienna Award, Hungary retook the territory of Northern Transylvania (which included Carei) from Romania. Towards the end of World War II, however, the city was taken back from Hungarian and German troops by Romanian and Soviet forces on 25 October 1944, during the Battle of Carei. In memory of this battle, the "Monument of the Romanian Soldier" was erected in the center of Carei; inaugurated in 1964, it is the work of the sculptor Gheza Vida. 25 October has been celebrated since 1959 as the Day of the Romanian Armed Forces.

Although between 1760 and 1920 the town was the seat of Szatmár County, the industrial development was not significant and it basically preserved its agricultural specificity until about 1960. In 1926 Carei was attached to Sălaj County. After 1950, Carei was included in the Baia Mare Region, while after 1968, along with the administrative-territorial reorganization of the country, it returned to Satu Mare County.

Until World War II, the industry of the town consisted of mills, the oil factory Ardealul, a station for collecting and fermenting tobacco, and some small workshops. During the Communist period, Carei gradually turned into an industrial town.

== Tourism ==
=== The Károlyi Castle ===
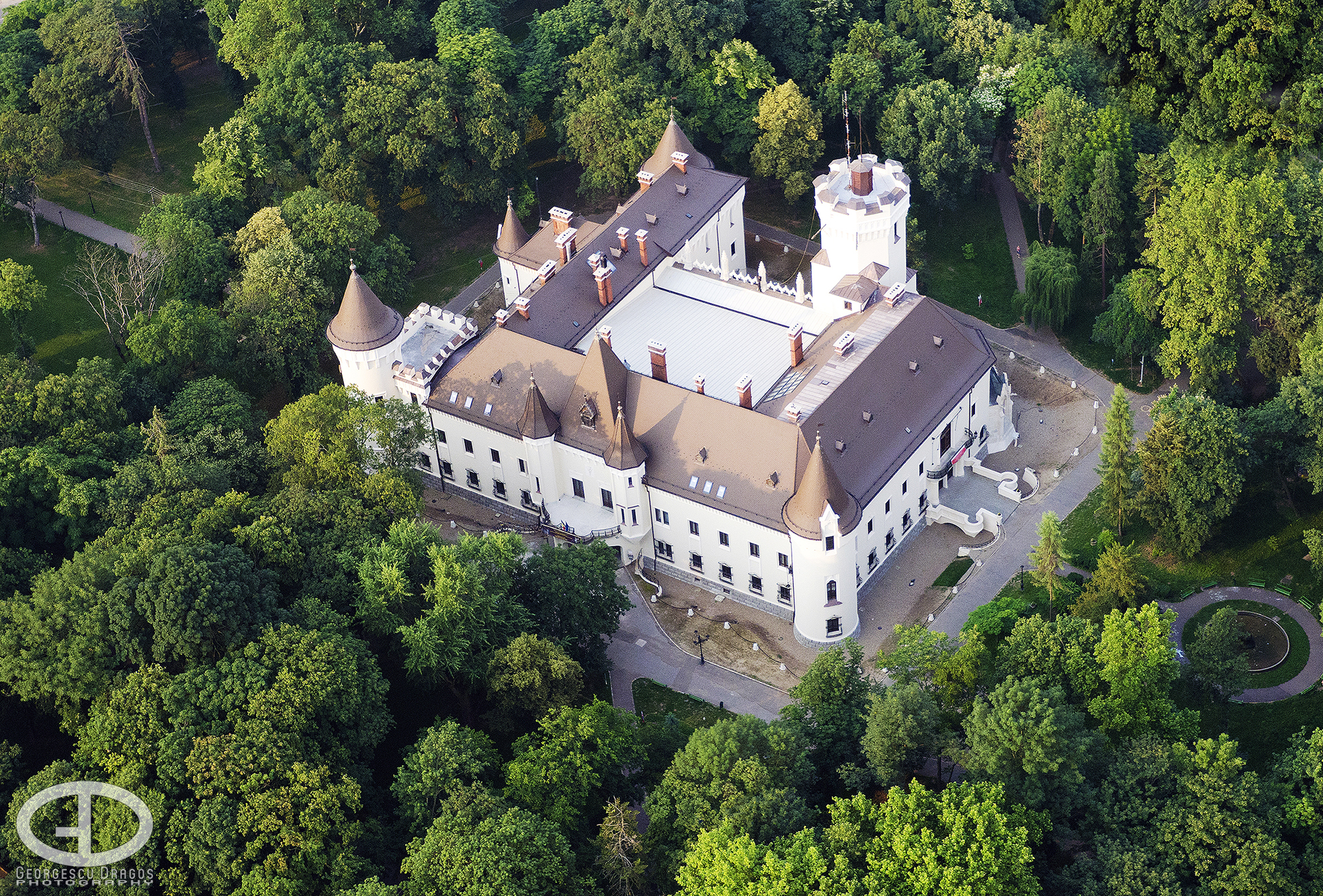
Aerial view of the Károlyi Castle

The most important historical building in the city is the Károlyi Castle. Built originally as a fortress around the 14th century, it was converted to a castle in 1794, undergoing further transformations during the 19th century. The manor is surrounded by an arboretum, covering a surface of about 30 acres (12 ha) and containing a great variety of species of trees and plants.

=== The Theater ===
Carei's theater was built in 1907 and was inspired by a project of architect György Kopeczek. The theater was first named after the writer József von Gaal, until the 1920s, when it was renamed Teatrul Carmen Sylva. After 1945 it was renamed again, to Teatrul Popular. In 1953, the theater received a complete overhaul and it was "modernized" both inside and outside.

=== The Vasile Lucaciu School ===
The "Vasile Lucaciu" school became a Romanian high-school in 1919. Prior to that, it was a Hungarian high-school. Nowadays it serves as a secondary school.

=== The Monument of the Romanian Soldier ===
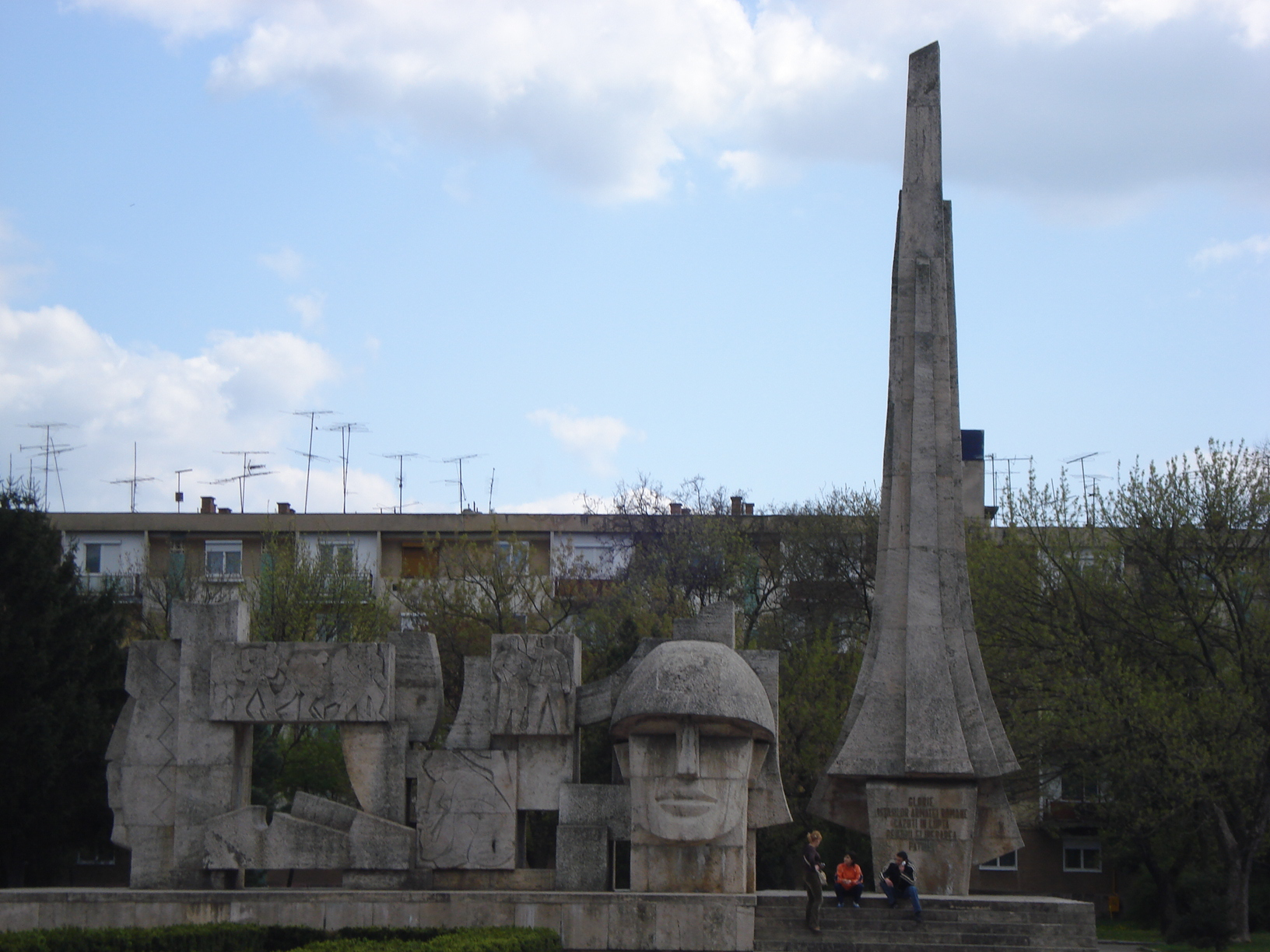
Monument of the Romanian Soldier, by Gheza Vida

The Monument of the Romanian Soldier, which commemorates the Battle of Carei of October 1944, is situated in the center of the city. The monument was built by the sculptor Gheza Vida and the architect Anton Dâmboianu. It was inaugurated in 1964, in the presence of the Defense Minister, Leontin Sălăjan. The monument was built with white stone and has impressive dimensions, with a frontal opening of 18 m (59 ft), a depth of 5 m (16 ft), and a height of 12 m (39 ft). The monument has the following inscription: "Glory to the soldiers of the Romanian Army, fallen in the struggles for the liberation of the homeland".

=== The Train Station ===
The first train station was built in 1871, when the Debrecen–Satu Mare railway was built. The Carei–Zalău railway was inaugurated on 23 December 1887. The building of today's train station was built between 1910 and 1912. During World War II the train station was heavily bombarded, but the damage it suffered was rapidly repaired.

== Demographics ==
Historical population
Year	Pop.	±%
1880	12,523	—
1890	13,475	+7.6%
1900	15,382	+14.2%
1910	16,078	+4.5%
1920	15,294	−4.9%
1930	16,042	+4.9%
1941	15,850	−1.2%
1956	16,780	+5.9%
1966	19,686	+17.3%
1977	24,050	+22.2%
1992	26,372	+9.7%
2002	22,781	−13.6%
2011	20,775	−8.8%
2021	18,957	−8.8%
Source (if not otherwise specified): Varga E. Árpád. 2021 data: INSSE

According to the 2021 census, Carei had a population of 18,957, marking a decrease from the figure recorded at the 2011 census (20,775 inhabitants).

Ethnic composition of Carei (2021)
1. Hungarians (52.1%)
2. Romanians (42.4%)
3. Romani (3.36%)
4. Germans (Sathmar Swabians) (1.91%)
5. Others (0.19%)
Religious composition of Carei (2021)
1. Roman Catholics (36.6%)
2. Romanian Orthodox (34.6%)
3. Reformed (20.3%)
4. Greek Catholics (5.57%)
5. Others (2.32%)
6. Irreligious, atheist and agnostic (0.59%)

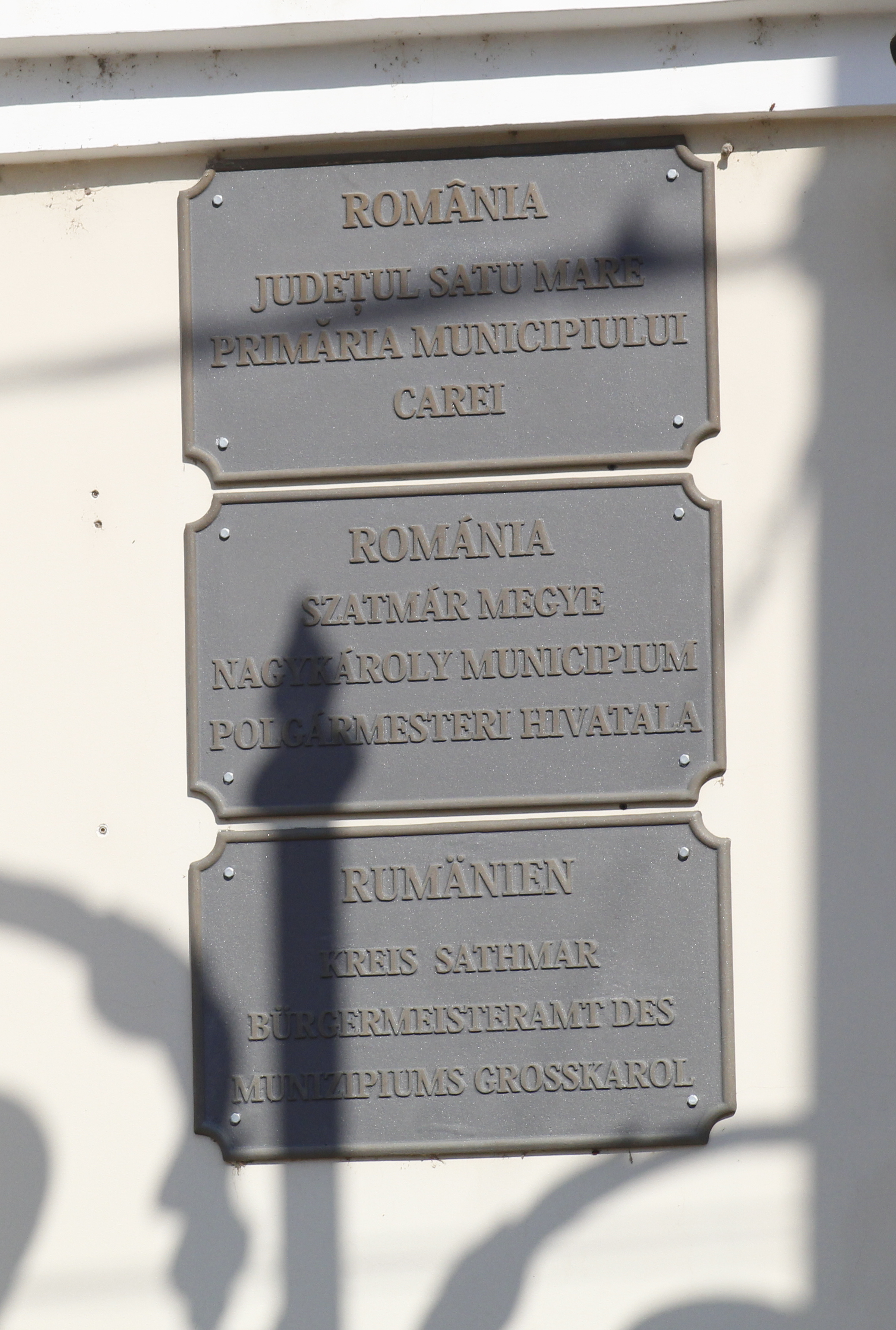
Multilingualism in Carei

== Notable residents ==
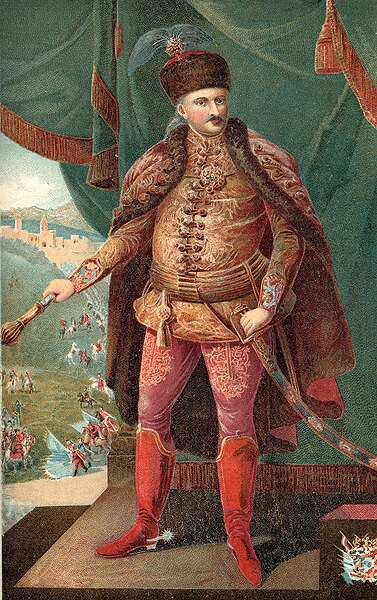
Count Sándor Károlyi de Nagykároly (1688–1743)

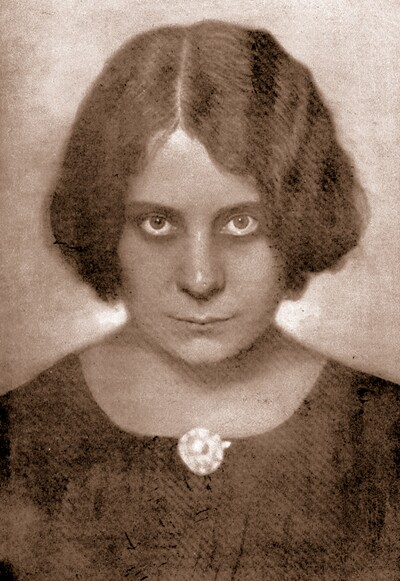
Margit Kaffka (1880–1918)

=== Politics ===
- Sándor Károlyi de Nagykároly (1668–1743), Hungarian aristocrat, statesman and Imperial Feldmarschall
- Salvator Cupcea (1908–1958), Romanian psychologist, physician, and political figure
- Oszkár Jászi (1875–1957), Hungarian Jewish social scientist, historian, and politician

=== Religion ===
- Gáspár Károli (1529–1591), Hungarian Calvinist pastor, translator (first translation of the Bible to Hungarian in 1586)
- Jenő Schönberger (1959–), Hungarian cleric, bishop of the Roman Catholic Diocese of Satu Mare
- Vasile Hossu (1919 – 1997), Romanian Greek Catholic hierarch
- Alexander Ratiu (1916–2002), Romanian-American priest of the Romanian Greek-Catholic Church
- Yosef Leifer (1891–1966), founder and first Rebbe of the Pittsburg Hasidic dynasty
- Avraham Abba Leifer (1918–1990), second Rebbe of the Pittsburg Hasidic dynasty
- Joel Teitelbaum (1887–1979), founder and first Grand Rebbe of the Satmar dynasty

=== Sports ===
- Miklós Bródy (1877–1949), Hungarian-Romanian chess master
- Eric Bicfalvi (1988–), Hungarian-Romanian footballer
- Adrian Sălăgeanu (1983–), Romanian footballer
- Dionisiu Bumb (1973–), Romanian footballer
- Szabolcs Perényi (1982–), Romanian-born Hungarian footballer
- Silviu Lung (1956–), Romanian footballer
- Florin Fabian (1974–), Romanian footballer
- Cornel Pavlovici (1942–2013), Romanian footballer
- István Kovács (1984 –), Hungarian-Romanian football referee
- Iosif Budahazi (1947–), Romanian fencer
- Tünde Vaszi (1972–), Hungarian-Romanian long jumper

=== Others ===
- Margit Kaffka (1880–1918), Hungarian female writer and poet
- Antal Ligeti (1823–1890), Hungarian landscape painter
- Ferdinánd Barna (1825–1895), Hungarian linguist, translator and librarian of the Hungarian Academy of Sciences

== Twin towns ==
Carei is twinned with:

- Dębica, Poland
- Orosháza, Hungary since 1991
- Mátészalka, Hungary
- Nyírbátor, Hungary since 2000

== Climate ==
Carei has a continental climate, characterized by hot warm and rainy summers, and cold and snowy winters. As the city is in the far north of the country, winter is colder than the national average. The average annual temperature is 9.6 °C (49 °F).

Climate data for Satu Mare
Month	Jan	Feb	Mar	Apr	May	Jun	Jul	Aug	Sep	Oct	Nov	Dec	Year
Mean daily maximum °C (°F)	0 (32)	3 (37)	10 (50)	15 (59)	20 (68)	22 (72)	25 (77)	25 (77)	21 (70)	15 (59)	7 (45)	2 (36)	13 (55)
Daily mean °C (°F)	−2 (28)	0 (32)	5 (41)	10 (50)	15 (59)	17 (63)	19 (66)	19 (66)	16 (61)	10 (50)	3 (37)	0 (32)	9 (48)
Mean daily minimum °C (°F)	−5 (23)	−3 (27)	1 (34)	5 (41)	9 (48)	12 (54)	13 (55)	13 (55)	10 (50)	5 (41)	0 (32)	−2 (28)	5 (41)
Average precipitation cm (inches)	2 (0.8)	2 (0.8)	2 (0.8)	4 (1.6)	7 (2.8)	8 (3.1)	8 (3.1)	7 (2.8)	4 (1.6)	4 (1.6)	3 (1.2)	2 (0.8)	59 (23)
Source: weatherbase.com

== Gallery ==
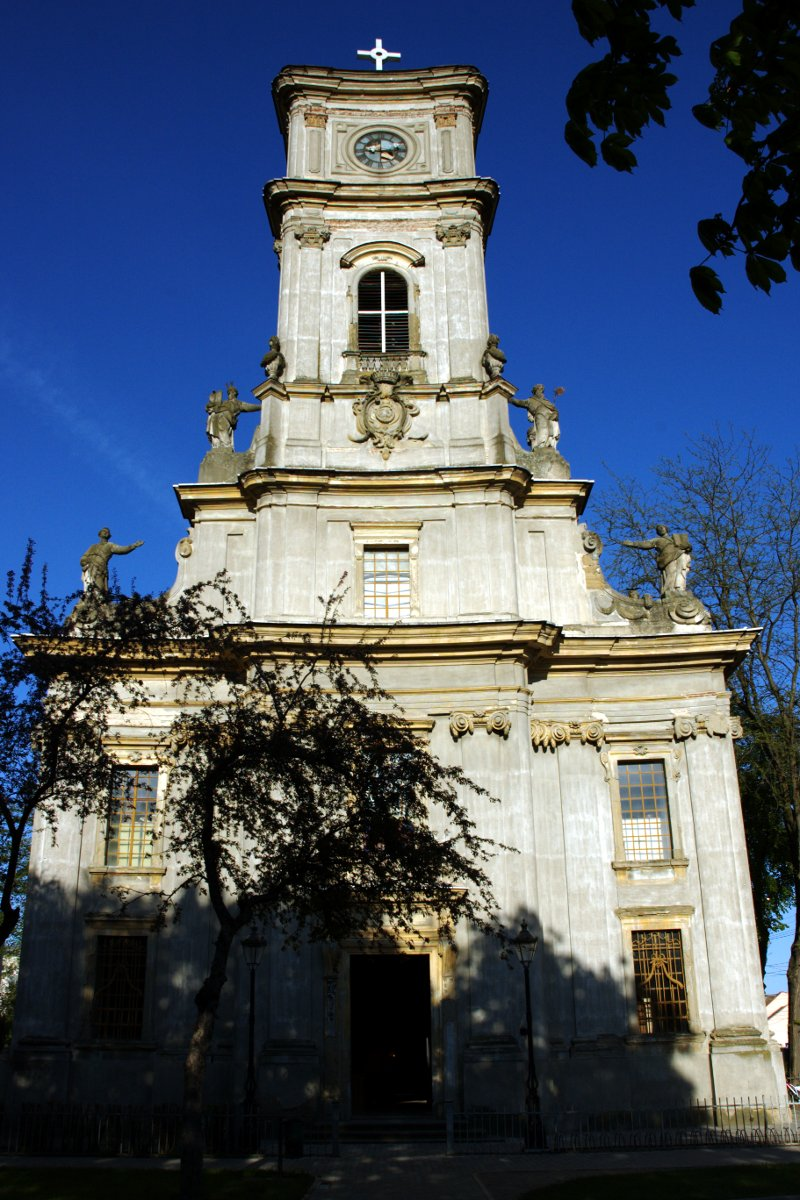
Saint Joseph Calasanctius Church

The Calvinist church

The synagogue

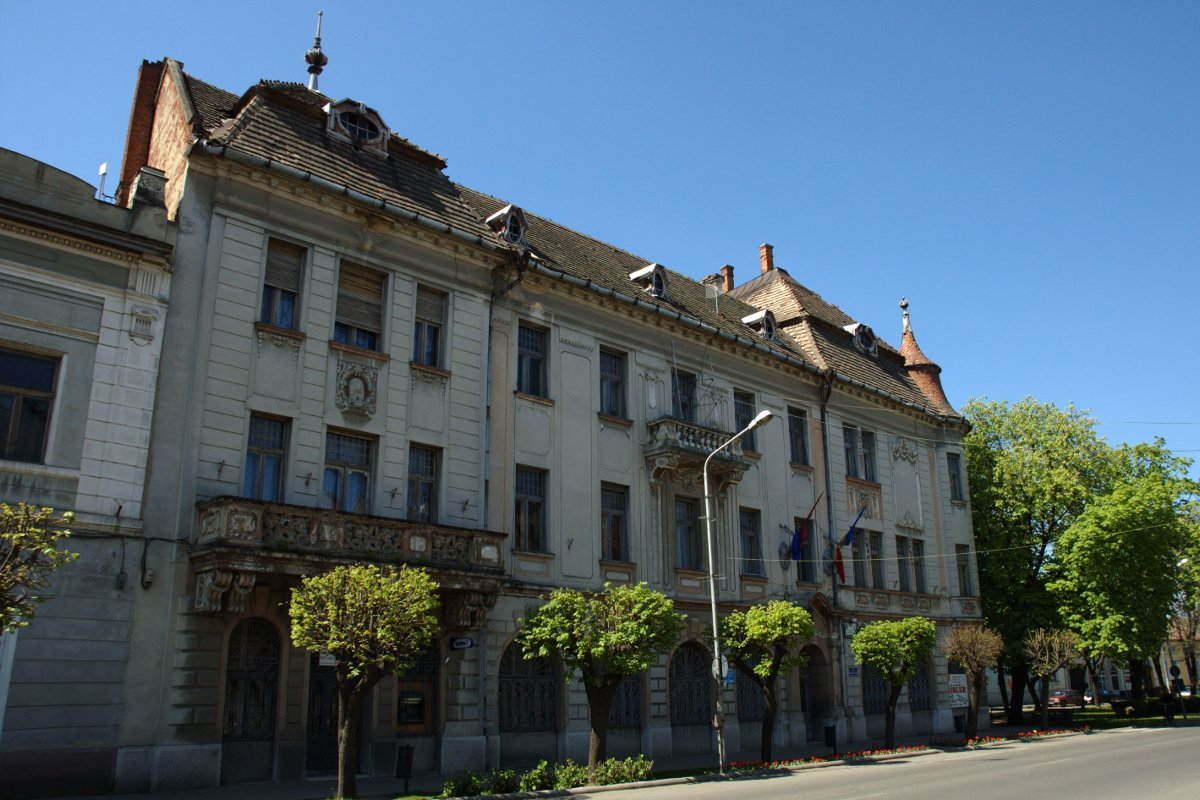
The Carei town hall

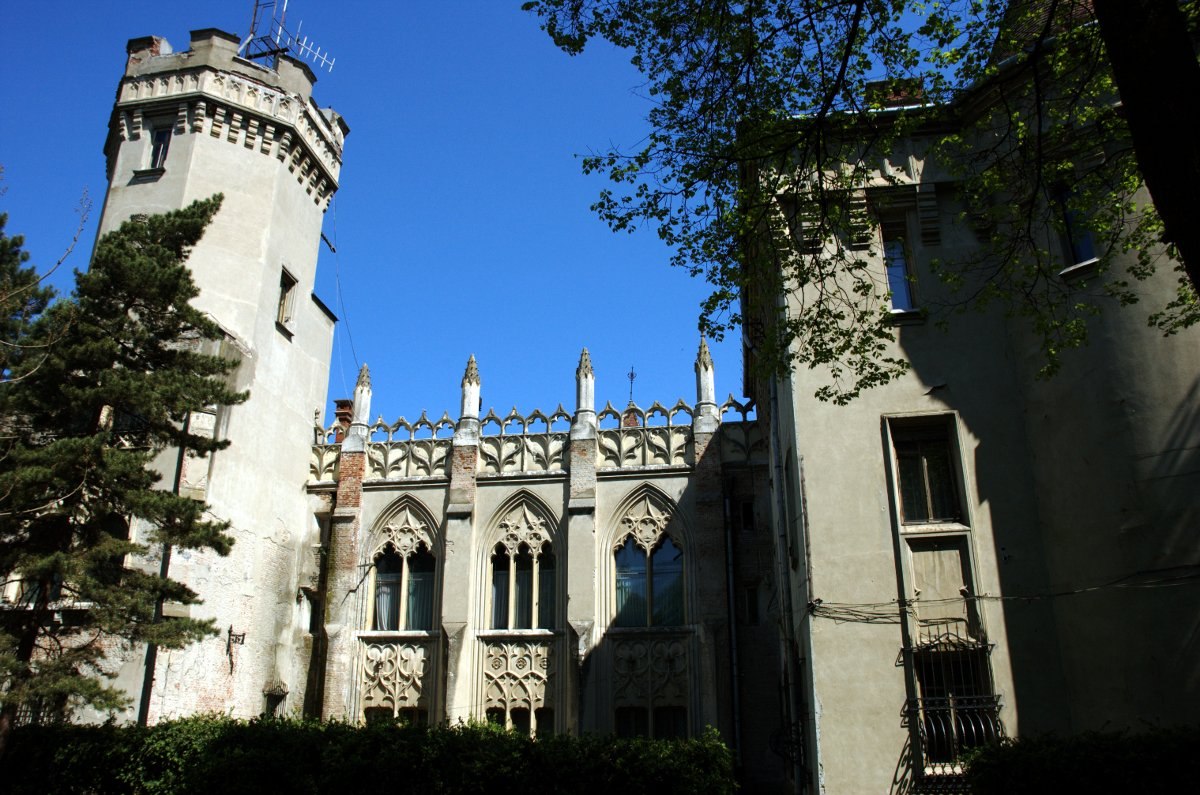
The Károlyi Castle

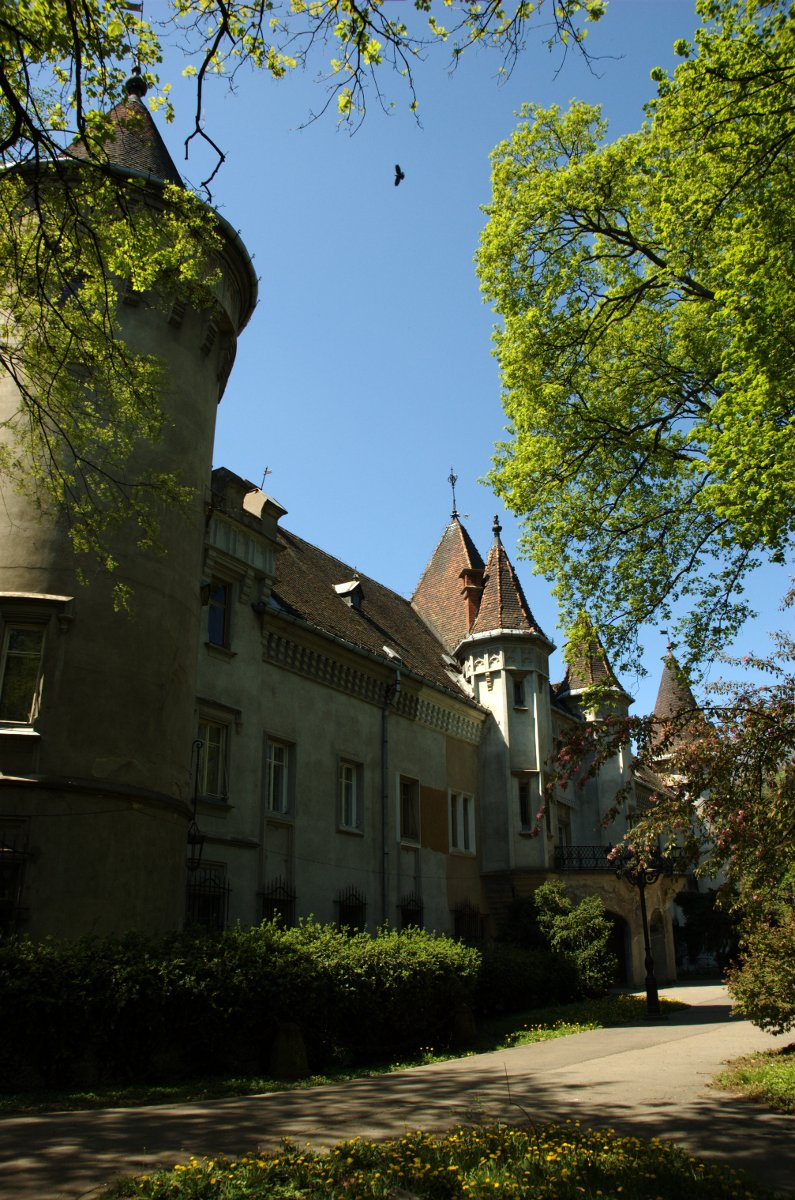
The Károlyi Castle

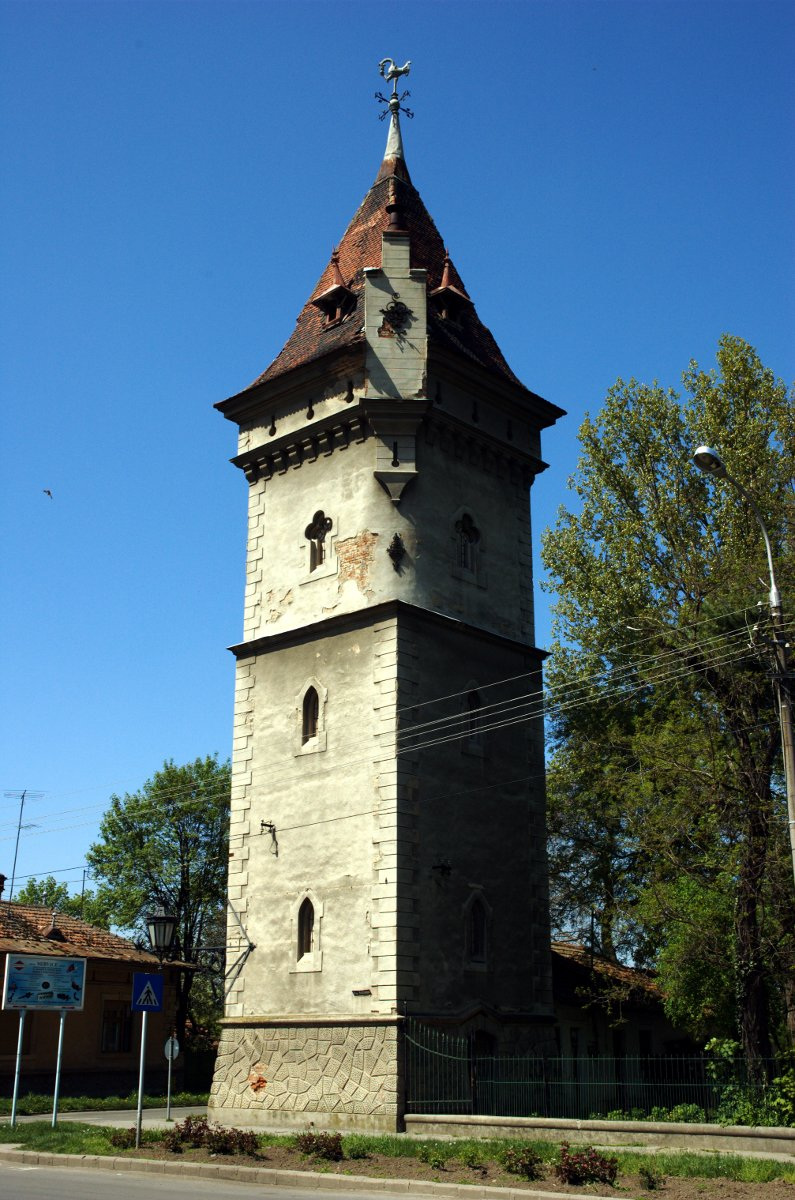
The castle's water tower

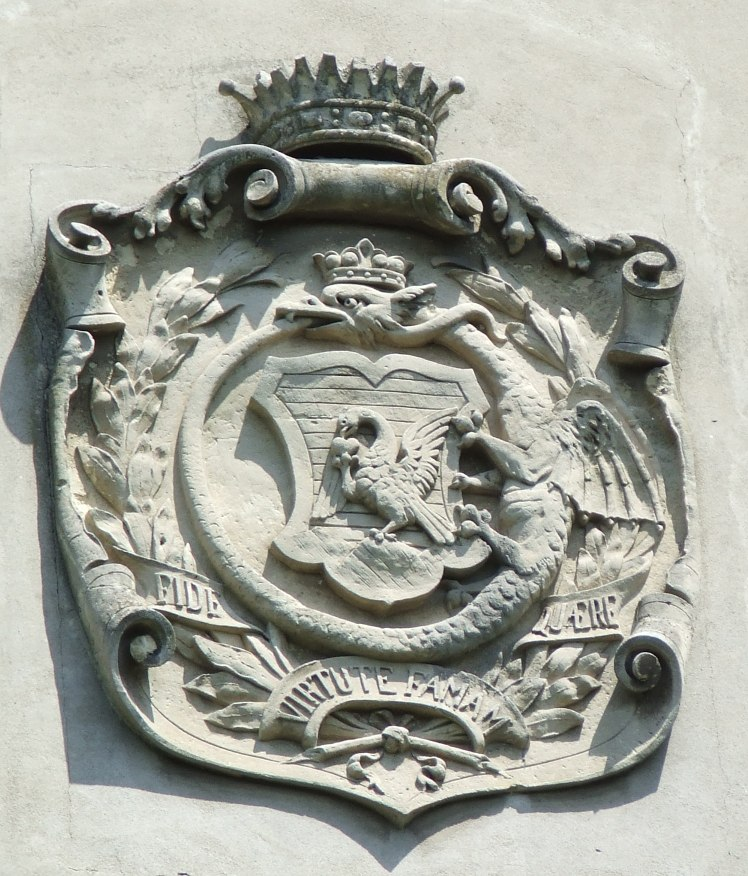
Coat of arms on the wall of the Károlyi Castle
