= Avraham Abba Leifer =

American rabbi (1918-1990)

- אברהם אבא לייפר
- Title: Second Pittsburgher Rebbe

Personal life
- Born: Avraham Abba Leifer; 1918 Nagykároly, Hungary (today Carei, Romania)
- Died: 7 January 1990 (aged 71–72) (10 Tevet 5750) Ashdod, Israel
- Buried: Har HaMenuchot, Jerusalem
- Spouse: Rachel Rosenbaum
- Children: 2
- Parent: Yosef Leifer (father)
- Dynasty: Pittsburgh

Religious life
- Religion: Judaism

Jewish leader
- Predecessor: Yosef Leifer
- Successor: Mordechai Yissachar Ber Leifer
- Began: 7 March 1966
- Ended: 7 January 1990
- Main work: Emunas Avraham
- Dynasty: Pittsburgh

Avraham Abba Leifer (Hebrew: אברהם אבא לייפר, Yiddish: אברהם אבא לייפער; 1918 – 7 January 1990) was the second Rebbe of the Pittsburgh Hasidic dynasty and the instigator for the relocation of the Hasidut from its original location in Pittsburgh, Pennsylvania to the Israeli coastal city of Ashdod. He was widely known for his yiras Shamayim (fear of Heaven).

== Early life ==
Avraham Abba Leifer was born in Nagykároly, Hungary (today Carei, Romania) to Rabbi Yosef Leifer, the grandson of Rabbi Mordechai of Nadvorna and a direct descendant of Grand Rabbi Meir the Great of Premishlan, a disciple of the Baal Shem Tov. He was the oldest of four brothers; the others were Yissachar Ber, Mordechai and Yitzchak Eisik. Yitzchak Eisik died at the age of 11.

Before the First World War, Rabbi Yosef Leifer traveled to America to raise money to marry off his orphaned nieces. When he came to the city of Pittsburgh, Pennsylvania, the local Hasidic community asked him to stay and serve as their spiritual leader. Rabbi Yosef agreed and brought over his entire family, naming himself the Pittsburger Rebbe. He served as Rebbe for more than four decades, until his death on 7 March 1966 (Shushan Purim 5726).

Though the family now lived in America, the Pittsburger Rebbe sent his three eldest sons to learn in yeshivas in Europe. He sent Avraham Abba to the yeshiva in Rachov right after his bar mitzvah in 1930. Avraham Abba received rabbinic ordination there at the age of 17, being fluent in the Shulchan Aruch and knowing the entire Shas by heart. He also learned in the yeshiva in Sekelheid, considered to be the crown of Hungarian yeshivas, where he excelled in his studies.

He married Rachel Rosenbaum, the daughter of Rabbi Isamar Rosenbaum, Admor of Nadvorna. Due to the political situation in Europe, his parents were unable to attend the wedding. He and his new wife were supported by her father for eight years in the city of Chernowitz.

== World War II ==
Of the three brothers learning in European yeshivas, only Avraham Abba survived the Holocaust. The Nazis who were in charge of Chernowitz ordered all Jews to sew a yellow badge on their coats and to shave their beards. Leifer did not shave his beard, and he once went outside to accompany a visitor home without remembering to put on his coat, on which the yellow badge was sewn. Nazi officials arrested him and brought him to a large courtyard where thousands of Jews had been rounded up for deportation. Though most of the captured Jews spoke bleakly about their fate, Leifer displayed strong emunah (faith in God) and immersed himself in heartfelt prayer. Two days later, when the men were being led into cattle cars, an SS officer instructed Leifer to stand to the side. After the transport left, the officer said to him, "You should know that in the past few days, I observed all of you, and I heard everyone talking with despair in their voices, except for you. You were busy praying to your God, so know that your God has heard your prayers and you are free to go." Leifer ran back to his father-in-law's house, where his family was already mourning his demise. He recounted this story of his personal redemption at every Passover Seder.

In 1947 Leifer and his wife succeeded in leaving Communist Romania and returning to America, where he reunited with his parents whom he had not seen in 17 years. In 1950 he moved to Newark, New Jersey to establish his Hasidic court, and established a yeshiva and Talmud Torah. Upon his father's death in 1966, Leifer accepted the invitation of the Pittsburger Hasidim to return to Pittsburgh and succeed his father as Rebbe.

== Move to Ashdod ==
In 1970, he decided to move to Israel. He chose the coastal city of Ashdod for his new base, though at the time the city had very few religious Jews and almost no Hasidim. He chose this city based on a dream which he had, in which a man who identified himself as Hasdai ibn Shaprut (the foreign minister of the caliph of Córdoba some 1000 years earlier) appeared to him and asked him to establish his court in Ashdod, promising him success. In Ashdod the Rebbe established Torah schools for children, bringing in teachers from other cities, and began monthly shiurim (classes) for adults. He also established a kollel for avreichim (married students) from Bnei Brak yeshivas and founded Yeshivas Tzidkas Yosef in memory of his father. During the last 20 years of his life, he brought thousands of Jews back to full Torah observance and drew countless families closer to the Hasidut.

The Rebbe became known throughout Israel for his great yiras Shamayim (fear of Heaven) and ahavas Yisrael (love for fellow Jews). His son, Rabbi Mordechai Yissachar Ber, testified that his father detached himself from worldly pleasures and did everything for the sake of fulfilling the mitzvos of the Torah. Yet he also displayed a genuine simcha shel mitzvah (joy in performing mitzvos), and would engage others with humorous vertlach (stories).

He was also quite humble. Unlike the custom of most Rebbes, who first partake of the food at a tish and then hand out shirayim to those in attendance, the Rebbe would distribute the food to the attendees and only afterward take for himself, saying that he wanted "to eat shirayim from the holy Jewish nation". He also waited for others to be served before he would partake at family meals.

== Death and legacy ==
The Rebbe died before dawn on Sunday, January 7, 1990 (10 Tevet 5750) at the age of 72. He was buried on Har HaMenuchot in Jerusalem. His son, Rabbi Mordechai Yissachar Ber, who succeeded him as Rebbe, built on his programs and expanded the Hasidut to its current total of nearly 200 families, each of whom has a personal relationship with the Rebbe.

The Rebbe left behind a large number of unpublished manuscripts and his published work, Emunas Avraham.

== Rebbes of Pittsburgh ==
1. Yosef Leifer (1924–1966)
2. Avraham Abba Leifer (1966–1990)
3. Mordechai Yissachar Ber Leifer (1990–2020)
4. Meshulam Eliezer Leifer (2020– )
