= Premishlan =

Premishlan can mean one of the following:

- Premishlan - a Yiddish name for the city of Peremyshlyany in Lviv province of western Ukraine
- Premishlan (Hasidic dynasty) - a Hassidic dynasty that originates from Peremyshlyany city
