= Pittsburgh (Hasidic dynasty) =

American Hasidic dynasty

Pittsburgh is a Hasidic dynasty founded in Pittsburgh, Pennsylvania in 1924 by Rabbi Yosef Leifer, a Hungarian rabbi and descendant of Rabbi Mordechai of Nadvorna. This is one of the few Hasidic dynasties named after an American city (others are Boston, Cleveland, Milwaukee and Philadelphia).

After flourishing in America for 46 years, the Hasidut was relocated to the Israeli coastal city of Ashdod under the leadership of Rabbi Yosef Leifer's son and successor, Rabbi Avraham Abba Leifer. The Hasidut was led by Rabbi Avraham Abba's son, Rabbi Mordechai Yissachar Ber Leifer, who died Chol Hamoed Succos 2020, presided over a nucleus of about 100 Pittsburgher families in Ashdod as well as families in Jerusalem, Bnei Brak, Beit Hilkia, New York City and California. Owing to the small size of the Hasidut, each member had a personal relationship with the Rebbe and Rebbetzin, who spoke English, Hebrew and Yiddish.

== Torah institutions ==
When Rabbi Avraham Abba Leifer moved the Hasidut to the Israeli city of Ashdod in 1970, the city had hardly any Orthodox residents and no Torah schools, aside from the Grodno Yeshiva for high-school-age boys. Thanks to the decades-long efforts of Rabbi Avraham Abba and his son and successor, Rabbi Mordechai Yissachar Ber, Pittsburgh now operates a cheder with over 300 students, two yeshivas with 90 students, and several kollels for married men. The Hasidut has also attracted formerly non-observant Jews through the Rebbe's shiurim (classes), tishen and personal interaction. Pittsburger families are concentrated in Rova Gimmel (the third quarter) of Ashdod.

== Niggunim ==
Pittsburgh is famous for its heartfelt niggunim, many of which were composed by the second and third Pittsburgher Rebbes. These melodies are known throughout the world and are even sung at the tishen of other Rebbes. One of the most famous is the tune for Ilan, Ilan, Bameh Avarechecha ("Tree, tree, with what can I bless you?"), which was written by the second Pittsburgher Rebbe and first sung by the Rebbe at a brit milah ceremony in Bnei Brak on Rosh Chodesh Nisan 1977 — the first day of the month in which Jews traditionally recite a blessing over fruit trees. A fascinating story in connection with the niggun and the baby at the bris was printed in the English Hamodia newspaper in 2006. The very popular tune known throughout the Jewish world, including in non-Orthodox synagogues, for "Yismechu HaShamayim" is also a Pittsburger niggun, composed by the first Pittsburgher Rebbe.

== Rebbes of Pittsburgh ==
1. Yosef Leifer, the Tzidkas Yosef (1891–1966)
2. Avraham Abba Leifer (1918–1990)
3. Mordechai Yissachar Ber (1955–2020)
4. Meshulam Eliezer Leifer (1979– )

== See also ==
- History of the Jews in Pittsburgh
