= Al-Mukhayzin =

Al-Mukhayzin المخيزن
- Etymology: Kh. el Mukheizin, the ruin of the storehouses
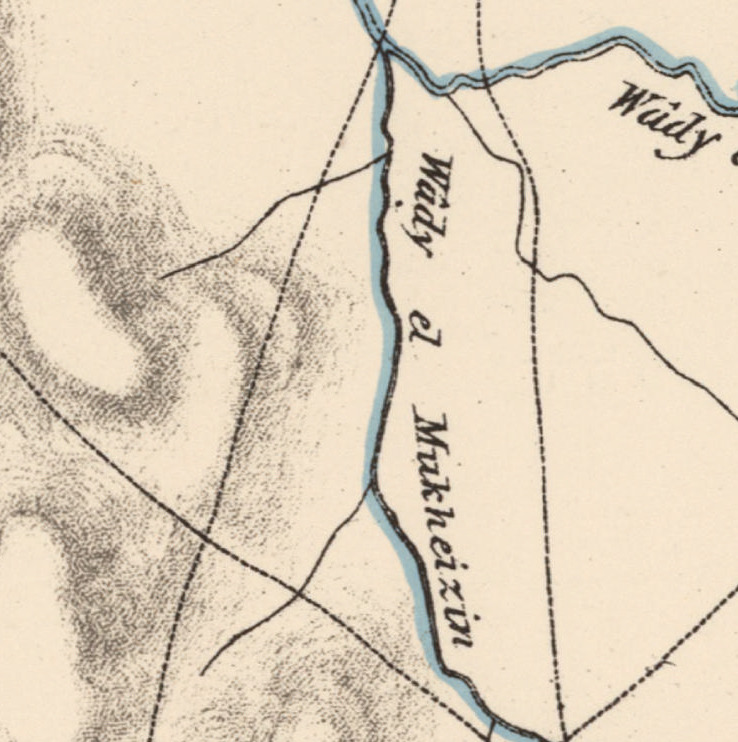
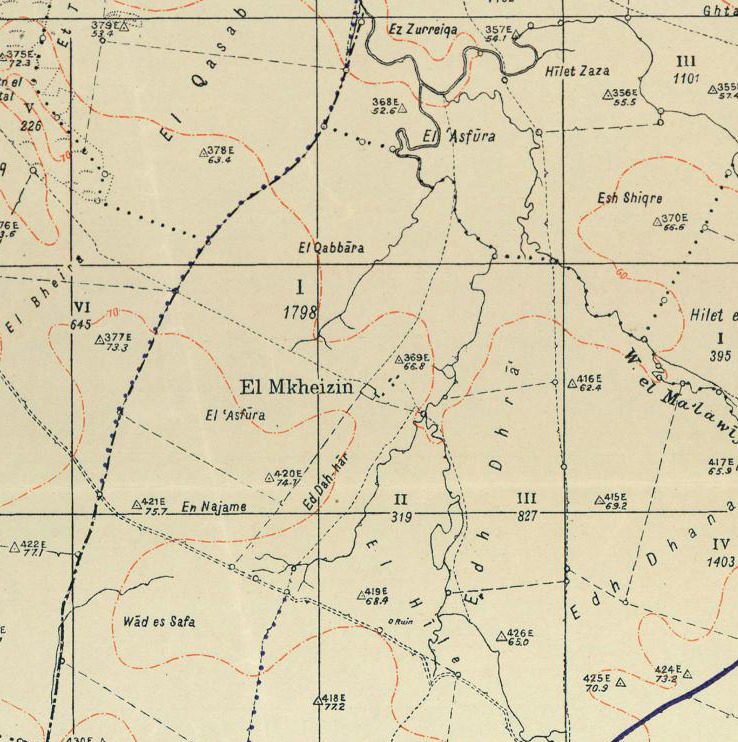
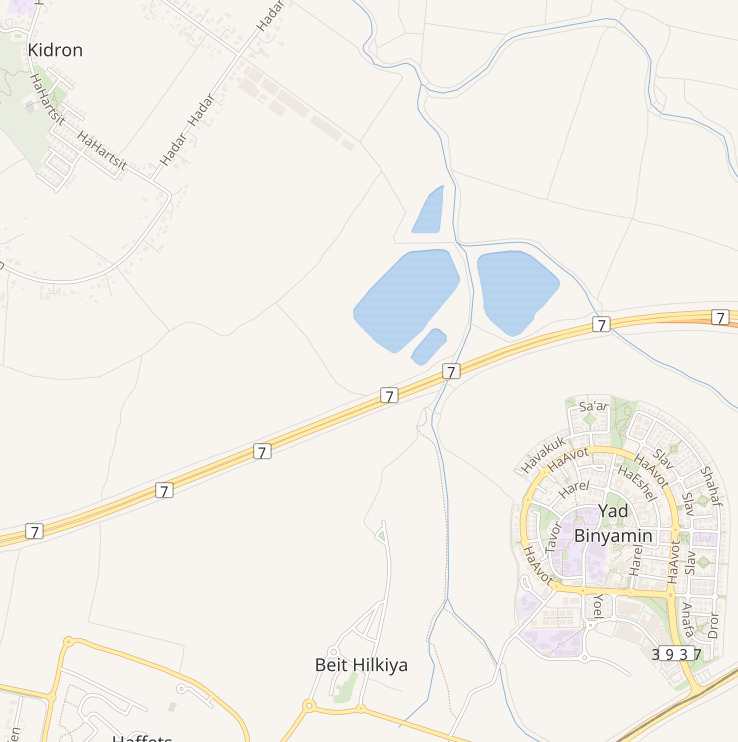
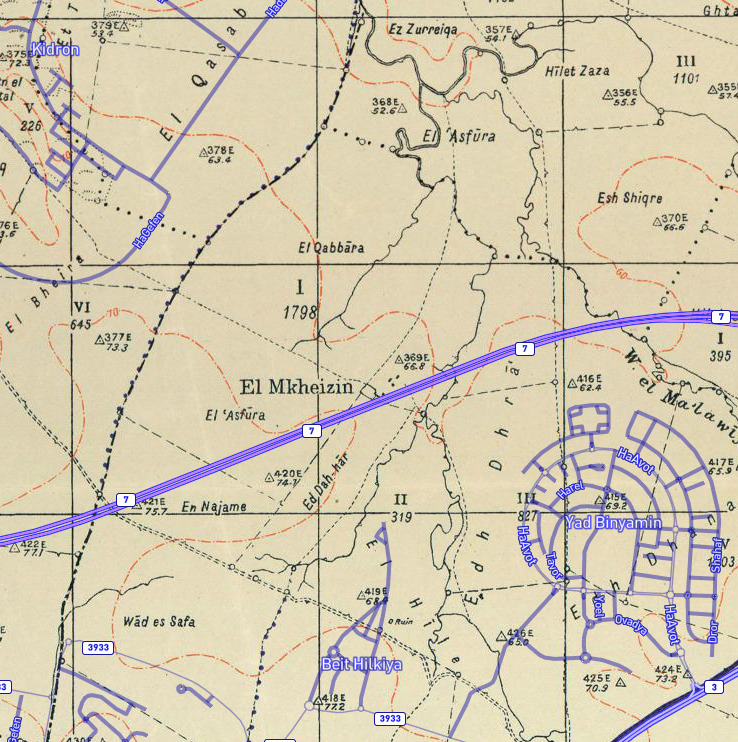
- 1870s map 1940s map modern map 1940s with modern overlay map A series of historical maps of the area around Al-Mukhayzin (click the buttons)

- Location within Mandatory Palestine
- Coordinates: 31°48′12″N 34°48′40″E
- Palestine grid: 132/134
- Geopolitical entity: Mandatory Palestine
- Subdistrict: Ramle
- Date of depopulation: April 20, 1948

Area
  - Total: 10,942 dunams (10.942 km^{2}; 4.225 sq mi)

Population (1945)
  - Total: 310
- Cause(s) of depopulation: Military assault by Yishuv forces
- Current Localities: Chafetz Chayyim, Revadim, Yad Binyamin, Beyt Chilqiyya

Al-Mukhayzin was a Palestinian village in the Ramle Subdistrict. It was ethnically cleansed during the Nakba on April 20, 1948, by the Givati Brigade of Operation Har'el. It was located 10 km (6.2 mi) southwest of Ramla.

== History ==
Al-Mukhayzin was a Bedouin settlement established in the 19th century.

During the Ottoman period, it was inhabited by the 'Arab al-Wahidat (عرب الوحيدات). These nomadic people depended on livestock, transportation, and basic agriculture for survival. Due to their transient lifestyle and modest material possessions, their presence has left only faint marks in the archaeological record.

In 1838, el-Mukhaizin was noted as a Muslim village in the Gaza district.

Al-Mukhayzin is mentioned as the southern limit reached by the displaced al-Wuḥaydī after mid-nineteenth-century pacification campaigns led by the fellāḥīn of Bani Malik and Abu Ghosh. These efforts marked the stabilization of the frontier west of Jerusalem and the reassertion of settled agriculture in the region.

In 1882, the PEF's Survey of Western Palestine noted at Khurbet el Mukheizin: "A large well and birkeh (=artificial pool), of masonry. Several ruined cisterns and a few scattered stones."

=== British Mandate era ===
In the 1931 census of Palestine, conducted by the British Mandate authorities, El Mukheizin had 79 Muslim inhabitants, in a total of 19 houses.

In 1944, Chafetz Chayyim was built on what traditionally was village land.

In 1945 statistics, the village had a population of 200 Muslims and 110 Jews, with a land area of 10,942 dunums. Of this, Palestinians used 10,936 dunums for cereals, while 6 dunams were classified as non-cultivable areas.

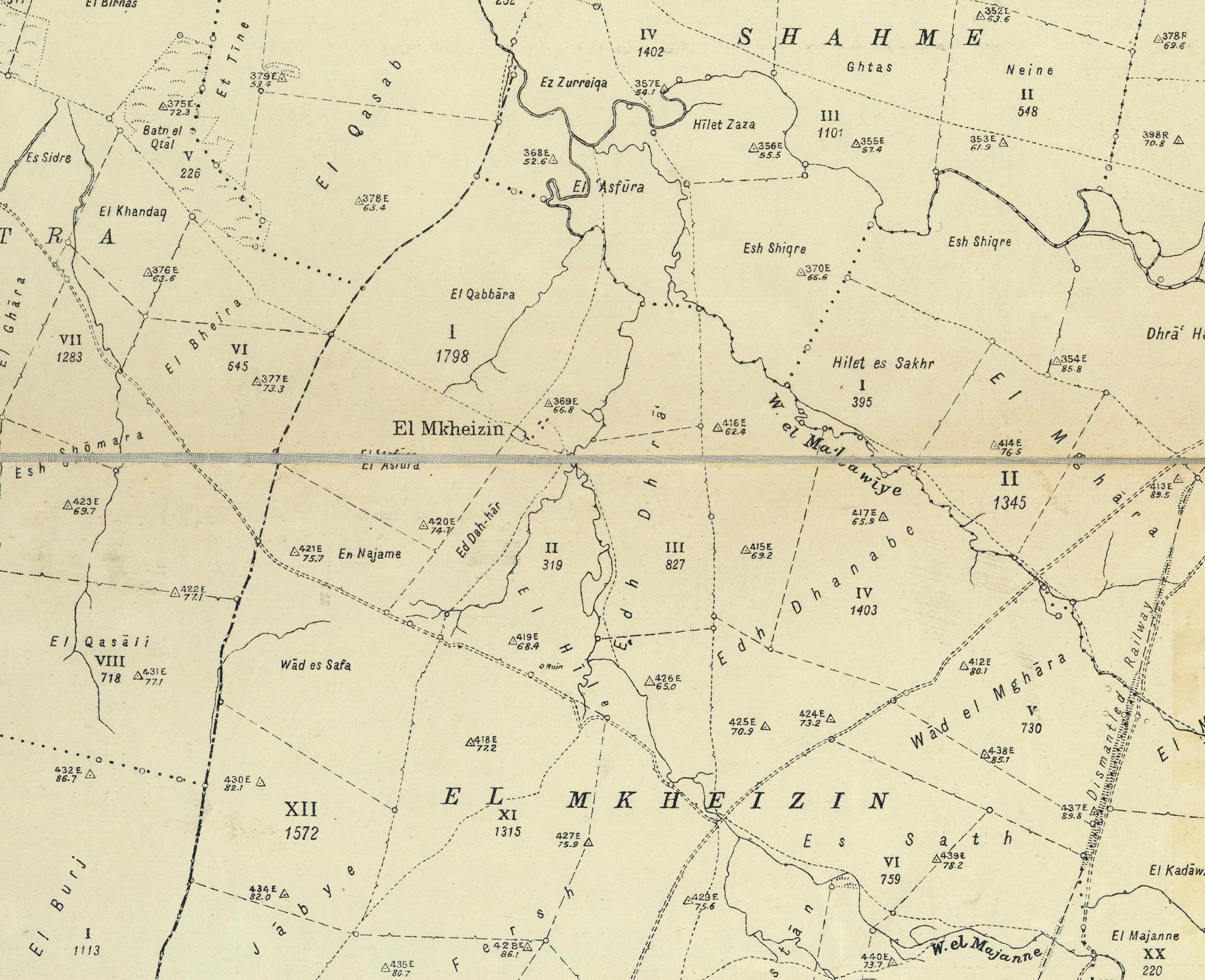
Al-Mukhayzin (El Mkheizin) 1930 1:20,000

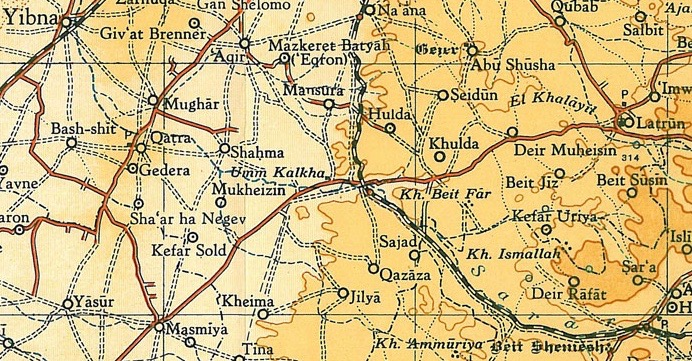
Al-Mukhayzin (Mukheiyzin) 1945 1:250,000

=== 1948, aftermath ===
Al-Mukhayzin was ethnically cleansed by an Israeli military assault on April 20, 1948.

Afterwards, Revadim, Yad Binyamin and Beyt Chilqiyya have all been built on village land.

In 1992 the village site was described: "The village has been completely leveled so that only flat, cultivated fields can be seen. There is a mound of stone and debris, about 2.5 m high, at the southern edge of the site. An orange grove has been planted next the mound, also at the southern edge."

== Bibliography ==
- Conder, C.R.; Kitchener, H.H. (1882). The Survey of Western Palestine: Memoirs of the Topography, Orography, Hydrography, and Archaeology. Vol. 2. London: Committee of the Palestine Exploration Fund.
- Department of Statistics (1945). Village Statistics, April, 1945. Government of Palestine.
- Hadawi, S. (1970). Village Statistics of 1945: A Classification of Land and Area ownership in Palestine. Palestine Liberation Organization Research Center. Archived from the original on 2018-12-08.
- Khalidi, W. (1992). All That Remains: The Palestinian Villages Occupied and Depopulated by Israel in 1948. Washington D.C.: Institute for Palestine Studies. ISBN 0-88728-224-5.
- Mills, E., ed. (1932). Census of Palestine 1931. Population of Villages, Towns and Administrative Areas. Jerusalem: Government of Palestine.
- Morris, B. (2004). The Birth of the Palestinian Refugee Problem Revisited. Cambridge University Press. ISBN 978-0-521-00967-6.
- Palmer, E.H. (1881). The Survey of Western Palestine: Arabic and English Name Lists Collected During the Survey by Lieutenants Conder and Kitchener, R. E. Transliterated and Explained by E.H. Palmer. Committee of the Palestine Exploration Fund.
- Robinson, E.; Smith, E. (1841). Biblical Researches in Palestine, Mount Sinai and Arabia Petraea: A Journal of Travels in the year 1838. Vol. 3. Boston: Crocker & Brewster.

== See also ==
- Welcome to al-Mukhayzin
- al-Mukhayzin, Zochrot
- Survey of Western Palestine, Map 16: IAA, Wikimedia commons
- al-Mukhayzin, from the Khalil Sakakini Cultural Center
