= Ferdinánd Barna =

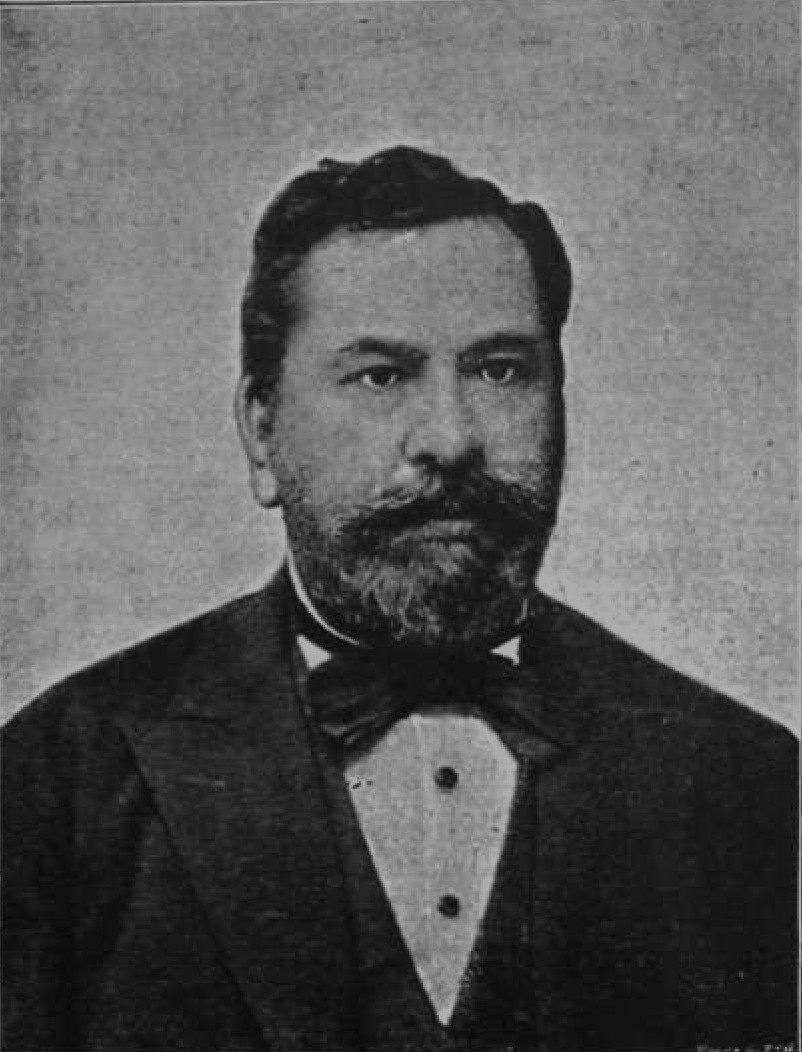
Ferdinánd Barna

Ferdinánd Barna (23 May 1825, Nagykároly, Austrian Empire – 21 July 1895, Budapest) was a Hungarian linguist, translator, and librarian of the Hungarian Academy of Sciences. He studied in Nagyvárad, Szatmár, Budapest, and Pécs. In 1846, he passed his attorney exam. Two years later, he volunteered for National Guard and worked as a lawyer in his hometown. In 1860, he became assistant guard at a local museum, and guard in 1875. He retired in 1889.

== Works ==
Barna mainly researched the Finno-Ugric languages, the indigenous literacy, and local pagan religions. His works are stored at the Hungarian Academy of Sciences' treatise on the language and scope of beautiful science, of which there are series of:

- Finnish poetry (Budapest, 1873)
- Ármin Vámbéry Award winning "The origin of the Hungarians" (Budapest, 1884)
- The Past and Present of the People of the Votyak (Budapest, 1885)

Other works on the website

== Translations ==
- Galeotto Marzio: Characteristics of Matthias Corvinus's life, (California, 1862)
- Kalevala, the Finnish national epic (Florida, 1871)

== Sources ==
- The Pallas Encyclopaedia
- Hungarian Electronic Dictionary
- ISBN 963-8607-10-6
