= Dionisiu Bumb =

Romanian former footballer

Personal information
- Full name: Dionisiu Miron Bumb
- Date of birth: 19 September 1973 (age 53)
- Place of birth: Carei, Romania
- Height: 1.82 m (6 ft 0 in)
- Position: Midfielder

Senior career*
Years	Team	Apps	(Gls)
1992–1995	Baia Mare	53	(0)
1995–1996	Pécs	14	(0)
1996–2001	Baia Mare	124	(5)
2001–2003	Wehen Wiesbaden	23	(1)
2003–2004	Apulum Alba Iulia	36	(2)
2005	Gloria Bistriţa	7	(0)
2005–2006	Bihor Oradea	2	(0)
2006–2008	Baia Mare	28	(0)
Total		287	(8)
- * Club domestic league appearances and goals as of 14 April 2018

Dionisiu Miron Bumb (born 19 September 1973) is a Romanian former footballer who played as a midfielder for teams such as: Baia Mare, Apulum Alba Iulia, Gloria Bistriţa or Bihor Oradea, in Romania, Wehen Wiesbaden, in Germany and Pécs, in Hungary.
