= Yosef Leifer =

American rabbi (1891-1966)

- Title: First Pittsburger Rebbe

Personal life
- Born: Yosef Leifer; 1891
- Died: 7 March 1966 (Shushan Purim 5726) (aged 74 or 75) Pittsburgh, Pennsylvania
- Buried: Har HaMenuchot, Jerusalem
- Children: 4
- Parent: Bertche (Yissachar Dov Ber) Leifer of Nadvorna-Satmar (father)
- Dynasty: Pittsburgh

Religious life
- Religion: Judaism

Jewish leader
- Successor: Avraham Abba Leifer
- Began: 1924
- Ended: 1966
- Main work: Tzidkas Yosef
- Dynasty: Pittsburgh

Yosef Leifer (1891 – 7 March 1966) was the founder and first Rebbe of the Pittsburg Hasidic dynasty in Pittsburgh, Pennsylvania, which he led for 42 years. Known as the Tzidkas Yosef after the name of his posthumously-published sefer, he was a scion of the Nadvorna dynasty.

== Early life ==
Rabbi Yosef was the son of Rabbi Yissachar Dov Ber (Bertche) Leifer of Navordna-Satmar, who was the son of Rabbi Mordechai of Nadvorna. His paternal ancestry goes back to Grand Rabbi Meir the Great of Premishlan, a disciple of the Baal Shem Tov. Rabbi Yosef's five brothers also became leaders of Hasiduts; they were: Rabbi Meir Leifer, first Grand Rabbi of Cleveland-New York, Rabbi Isamar Leifer, first Grand Rabbi of Bushtina, Rabbi David Leifer, Grand Rabbi of Bania, Rabbi Aharon Moshe Leifer of Grosswardein, and Rabbi Sholom Leifer, Grand Rabbi of Brighton Beach. He also had several sisters. His father died in 1906, when he was 15 years old.

He married in 1917 and lived in Krula, Hungary (now Carei, Romania) for the next 7 years. He had four sons. The eldest, Avraham Abba, was the only one who survived him and acceded to the position of Pittsburger Rebbe after his death. His youngest son, Yitzchak Eizik, died shortly after his marriage; two other sons, Yissachar Ber and Mordechai, were murdered by the Nazis in 1944.

== Move to America ==
Before the First World War, Rabbi Yosef Leifer traveled to America to raise money to marry off his orphaned nieces. When he came to the city of Pittsburgh, Pennsylvania, the local Hasidic community asked him to stay and serve as their spiritual leader. Rabbi Yosef agreed and brought over his entire family, naming himself the Pittsburger Rebbe. He served as Rebbe until his death in 1966. Two of his brothers, Rabbi Meir and Rabbi Sholom, followed him to America and founded their Hasiduts there as well.

Though the family now lived in America, Rabbi Yosef sent his three oldest sons to learn in yeshivas in Europe. Avraham Abba went to the yeshiva in Rachov after his bar mitzvah in 1930. He excelled in his studies and received rabbinic ordination there at the age of 17. He also learned in the yeshiva in Sekelheid. considered to be the crown of Hungarian yeshivas. He married the daughter of Rabbi Isamar Rosenbaum of Nadvorna. Due to the political situation in Europe, his parents were unable to attend the wedding.

While his two brothers were murdered by the Nazis, Rabbi Avraham Abba and his wife survived the war and returned to America in 1947. They settled in Newark, New Jersey, where Rabbi Avraham Abba eventually established a Hasidic yeshiva and Talmud Torah. Upon his father's death in 1966, he accepted the invitation of the Pittsburger Hasidim to succeed his father as Rebbe.

== Death and legacy ==
Rabbi Yosef died on 7 March 1966 (Shushan Purim 5726) in Denver, Colorado and was buried on Har HaMenuchot in Jerusalem.

In 1970, Rabbi Avraham Abba relocated the Pittsburg Hasidut to the Israeli coastal city of Ashdod. Here he founded Yeshivas Tzidkas Yosef, named in memory of his father, as well as established a Torah school for children and a kollel for married men. After Rabbi Avraham Abba's death in 1990, his son, Rabbi Mordechai Yissachar Ber Leifer, succeeded him as Rebbe and further built up the Hasidic presence in Ashdod with a cheder, yeshivas, and kollels. After Rabbi Mordche's death in october 2020 his son, Rabbi Meshulem Elizer Leifer, continued and further built up the Hasidic presence in Ashdod.

== Rebbes of Pittsburgh ==
1. Yosef Leifer (1924–1966)
2. Avraham Abba Leifer (1966–1990)
3. Mordechai Yissachar Ber Leifer (1990–2020)
4. Meshulam Eliezer Leifer (2020– )
