= Revadim =

Kibbutz in southern Israel

Revadim: רבדים (Hebrew); رفاديم (Arabic)
- Location within Ashkelon region of Israel Location within Israel
- Coordinates: 31°46′25″N 34°49′1″E
- Country: Israel
- District: Southern
- Subdistrict: Ashkelon
- Council: Yoav
- Affiliation: Kibbutz Movement
- Founded: 14 February 1947 (original); 28 November 1948 (current)
- Founder: Hashomer Hatzair members (original); Bulgarian Jews (current)
- Population (2024): 915
- Website: http://www.revadim.org.il

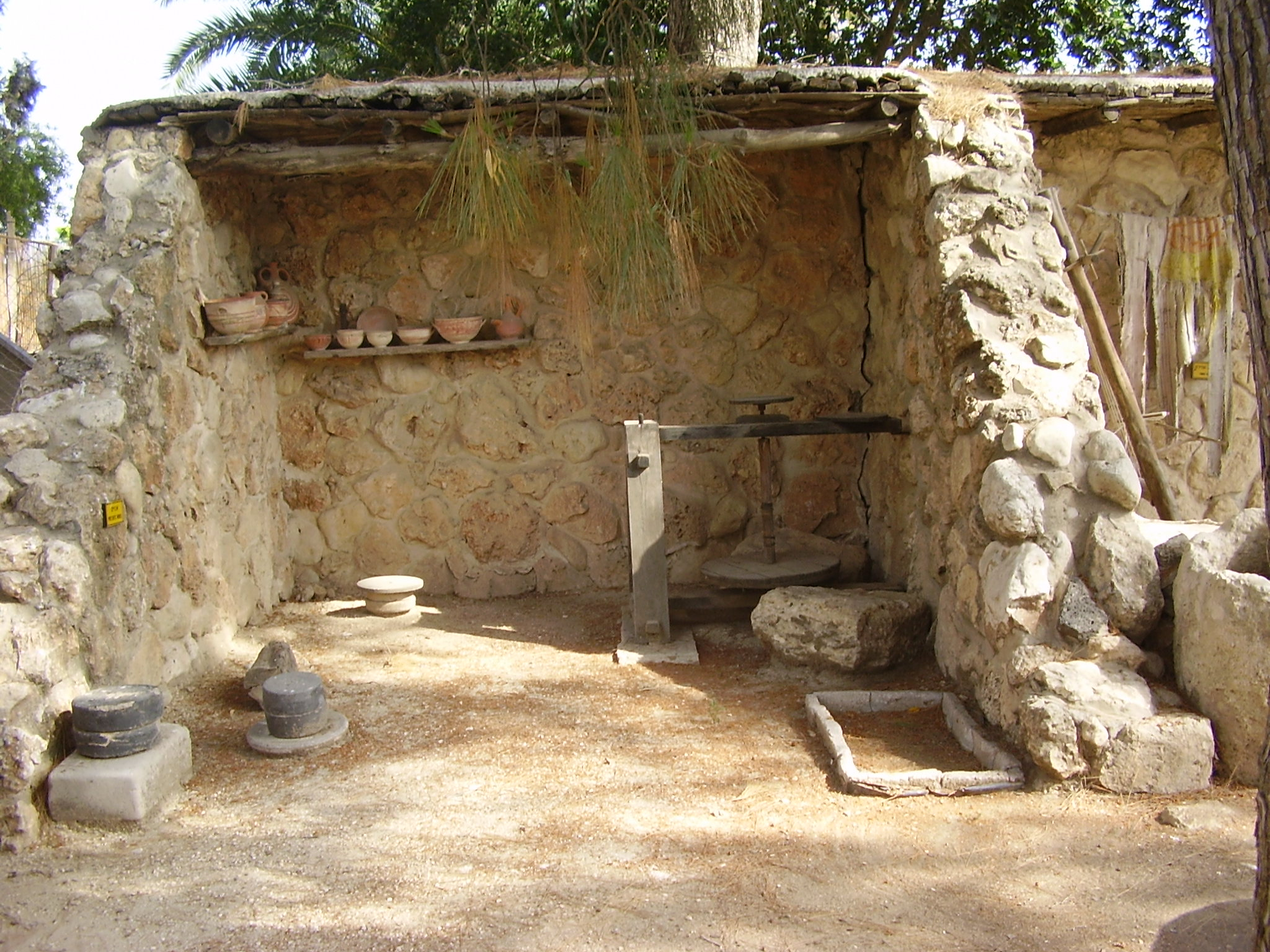
Reconstructed Philistine house

Revadim (Hebrew: רְבָדִים, lit. "terraces") is a kibbutz in southern Israel. Located in the southern Shephelah (Judean foothills) region, it falls under the jurisdiction of Yoav Regional Council. In 2024 it had a population of 915.

== History ==
Revadim was founded on 14 February 1947 as the fourth settlement of the Etzion Bloc in the Hebron Hills. It was established by the Tzabar pioneering group (distinct from the more recent Garin Tzabar) on tracts of land purchased by the Jewish National Fund in Ein Abu Zeid and Shuweika. While the land was being reclassified as musha'a [collectively owned land], the group cleared 100 dunams, 70 in Ein Abu Zeid and 30 in Wadi Abu Nofal, where the JNF owned a tract of mafruz [individually owned tracts]. Plans included the reclamation of 70 dunams in Wadi Abu Nofal and 150 in Dhahr al-Masatikh, which were acquired as part of a land exchange agreement.

After the Kfar Etzion massacre on 13 May 1948, the village was razed to the ground by the Arab Legion. Survivors from Revadim, along with those from Massu'ot Yitzhak and Ein Tzurim, surrendered through the Red Cross and 350 residents there were taken as Jordanian prisoners of war and held as captives until their release nine months later.

The kibbutz was re-established in a new location on 28 November 1948. The released POWs were joined by immigrants from Bulgaria and other countries. The new Revadim was located on the land of the newly depopulated Palestinian villages of Al-Mukhayzin and Al-Khayma.

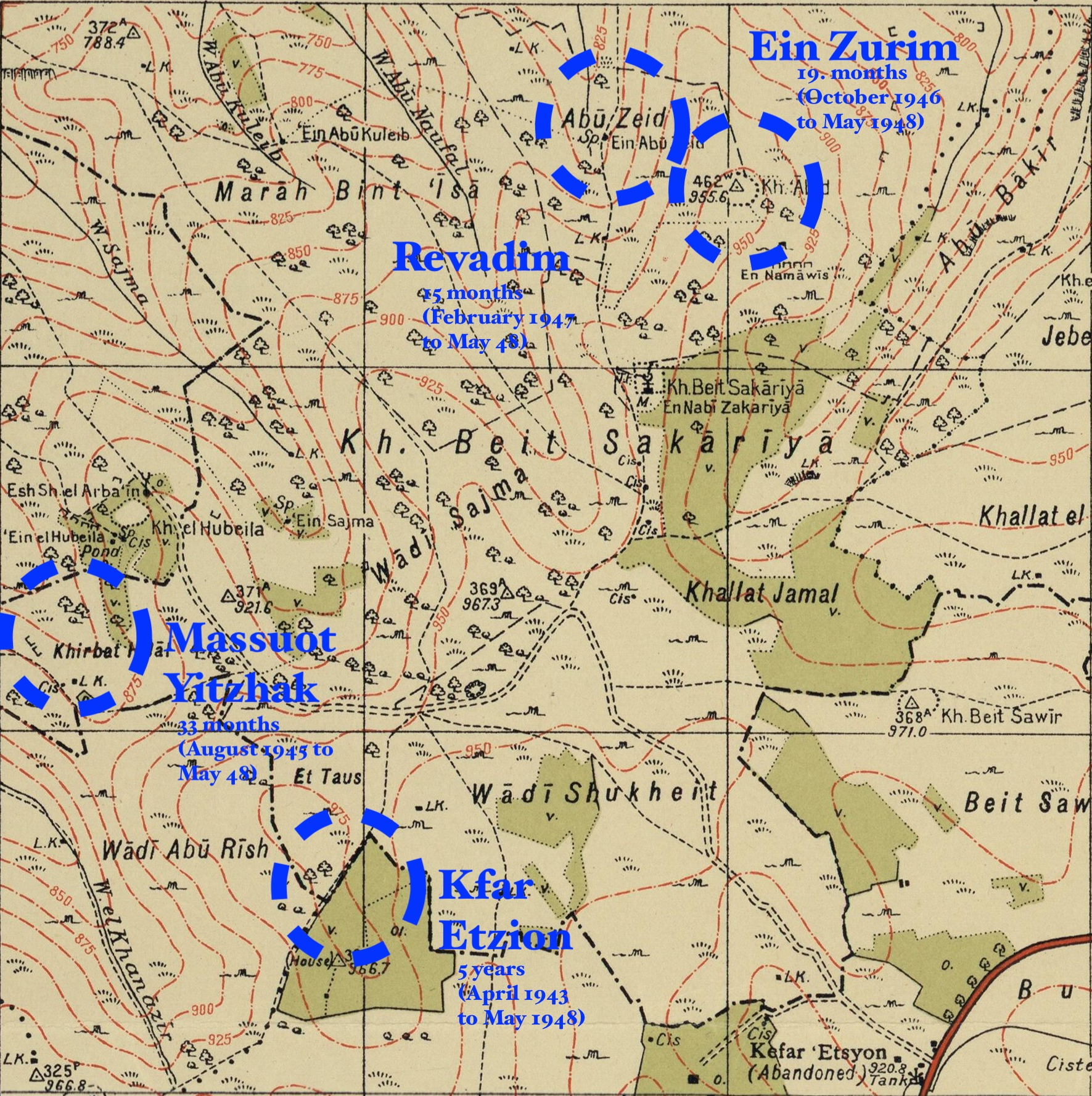
The four kibbutzes of the Gush Etzion at the time of the 1948 war (Kfar Etzion, Ein Zurim, Massuot Yitzhak, Revadim) overlaid on a 1943 Survey of Palestine map

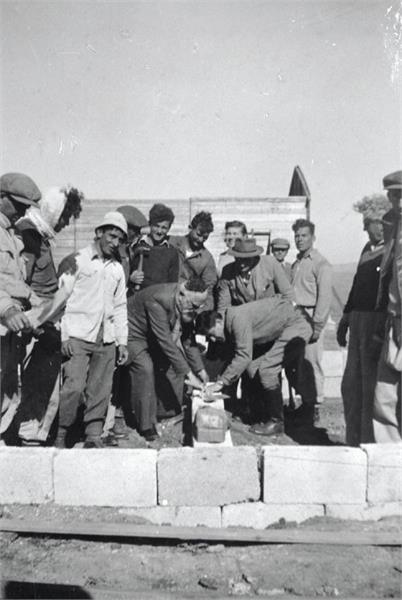
Revadim, 11 February 1947, Mr Pinchas Margalit lays foundation stone

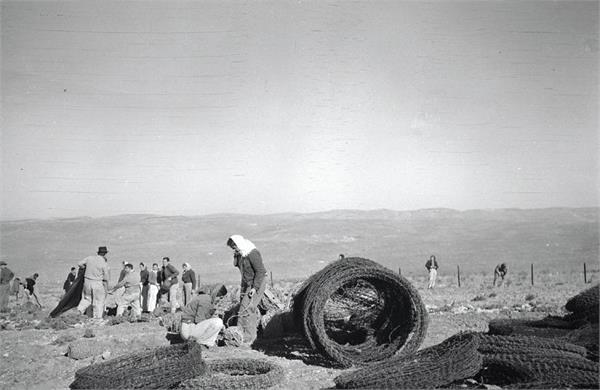
Revadim, February 1947, fencing

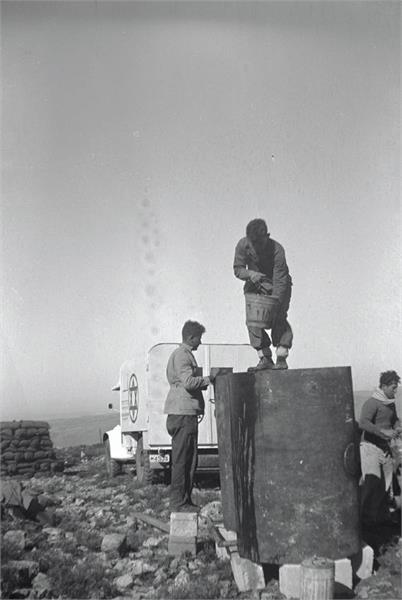
Revadim, February 1947, water tank, Magen David Adom ambulance in background

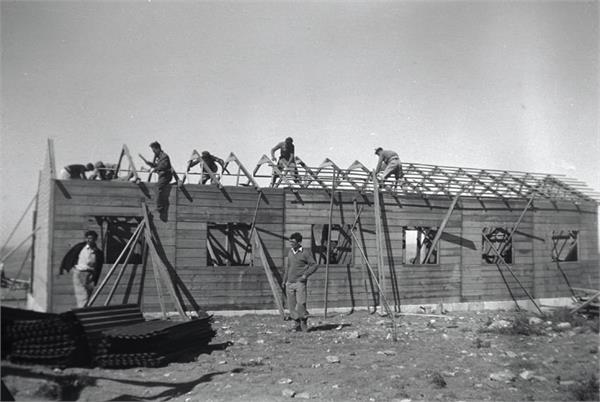
Revadim, February 1947, first building

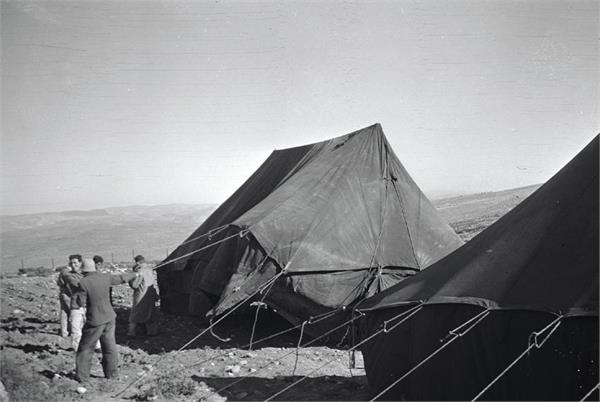
Revadim, February 1947, colonist's accommodation

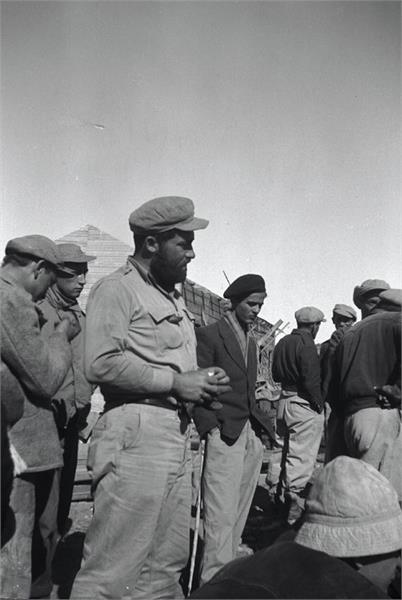
Revadim, February 1947, American students

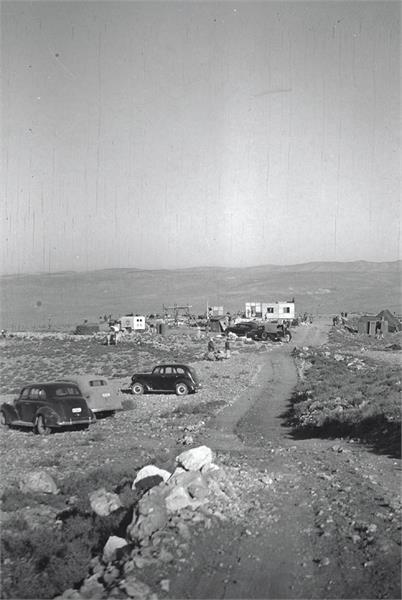
Revadim, 11 February 1947

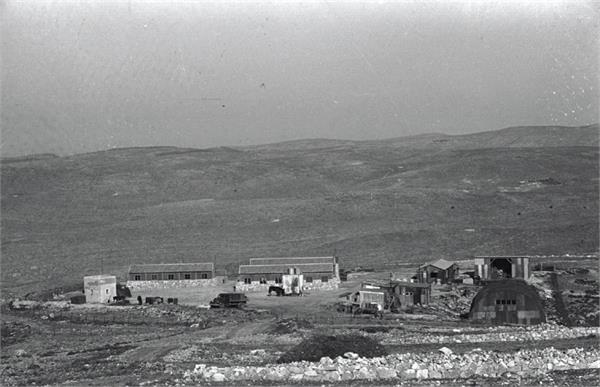
Revadim, 1 December 1947

== Economy ==
The economy is based on tourism and small industry. It operates a guest rooms and a museum of antiquities. The Roman Glass Co. designs original jewellery for a worldwide market.

== Landmarks ==
The kibbutz has a memorial for members who fell in the 1948 Arab–Israeli War. Tel Miqne-Ekron, an archaeological tell on the grounds of the kibbutz, is believed to be the site of the biblical city of Ekron. A reconstructed Philistine street is open to visitors. The kibbutz operates the Ekron Museum of the History of Philistine Culture which displays finds from the excavations.

== Archaeology ==
=== Prehistory ===
An archeological site in the Revadim region, other than Tel Miqne-Ekron, is at least 300 to 500 thousand years old (based on paleomagnetism analysis and uranium date series), and the archaeological finds there belong to the Late Acheulean. Numerous faunal remains were excavated at the site, as well as some flint tools with fat residue, suggesting that the bones (including those of straight-tusked elephant) belong to butchered game.

=== Tel Miqne, the Philistine city of Ekron ===
Tel Miqne-Ekron (Khirbat al-Muqanna') is one of the largest Iron Age (12th century–586 BCE) sites in Israel. Archaeologists have discovered over 100 7th-century BCE oil presses there, as well as the Ekron Inscription from that same century, which identifies the site as Philistine Ekron.

The tell shows signs of occupation in the Chalcolithic period (4500–3100 BCE) and throughout the Bronze Age (3100–1200 BCE), but only becomes an important city in the 12th century BCE with the arrival of the Philistines, one of the Sea Peoples. Once the Kingdom of Judah managed to take over the dominant position from the Philistines in the 10th century BCE, Ekron was reduced in importance and size (from 10 acres to 5 acres, with the abandonment of the Lower City). The Assyrian conquest of the 8th century BCE actually brought an economic revival, with a huge olive oil industry occupying 20% of the space within the city, and with a large number of loom weights found in the oil production rooms indicating that the population developed an active textile industry for the time outside the olive processing season. Ekron supplied Egypt and the Assyrian empire with 700 tons of olive oil a year, making it the largest olive oil industrial center in the ancient Middle East. After the Babylonian onslaught of the 6th century BCE, the Philistine culture and identity disappeared.

The reconstructed Philistine street in the kibbutz, which can be visited only by previous appointment, features an oil press, a potter's wheel and a loom.
