= Tish (Hasidic celebration) =

Hasidic celebration

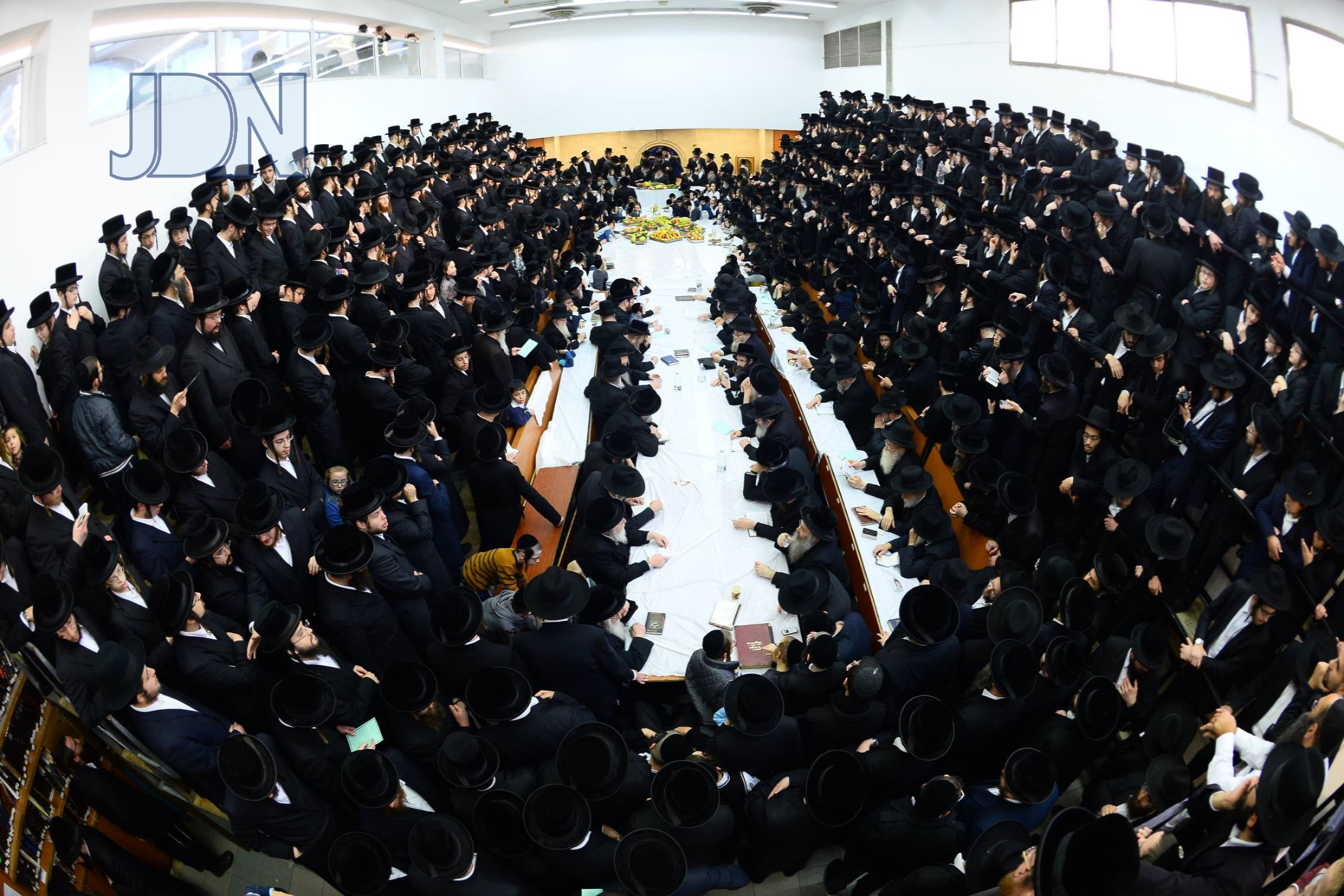
A tish in the court of Nadvorna

A tish, also tische (Yiddish: טיש, lit. 'table', pl. טישן, tischn) is a Shabbat or holiday gathering for Hasidic Jews around their rabbi or rebbe. In Chabad, a tische is called hitva'adut (התועדות). It may consist of speeches on Torah subjects, singing of melodies known as niggunim (singular niggun) and zemirot ("hymns"), with refreshments being served. Hasidim see it as a moment of great holiness.

Within Hasidic Judaism, a tische refers to any joyous public celebration or gathering or meal by Hasidim at a "table" of their rebbe. Such a gathering is staged around the blessing of Melchizedek-themed "setting of the table" and so is often referred to in Hebrew as Arichat HaShulchan (עריכת השולחן). Bread and wine are essential elements.

== Overview ==
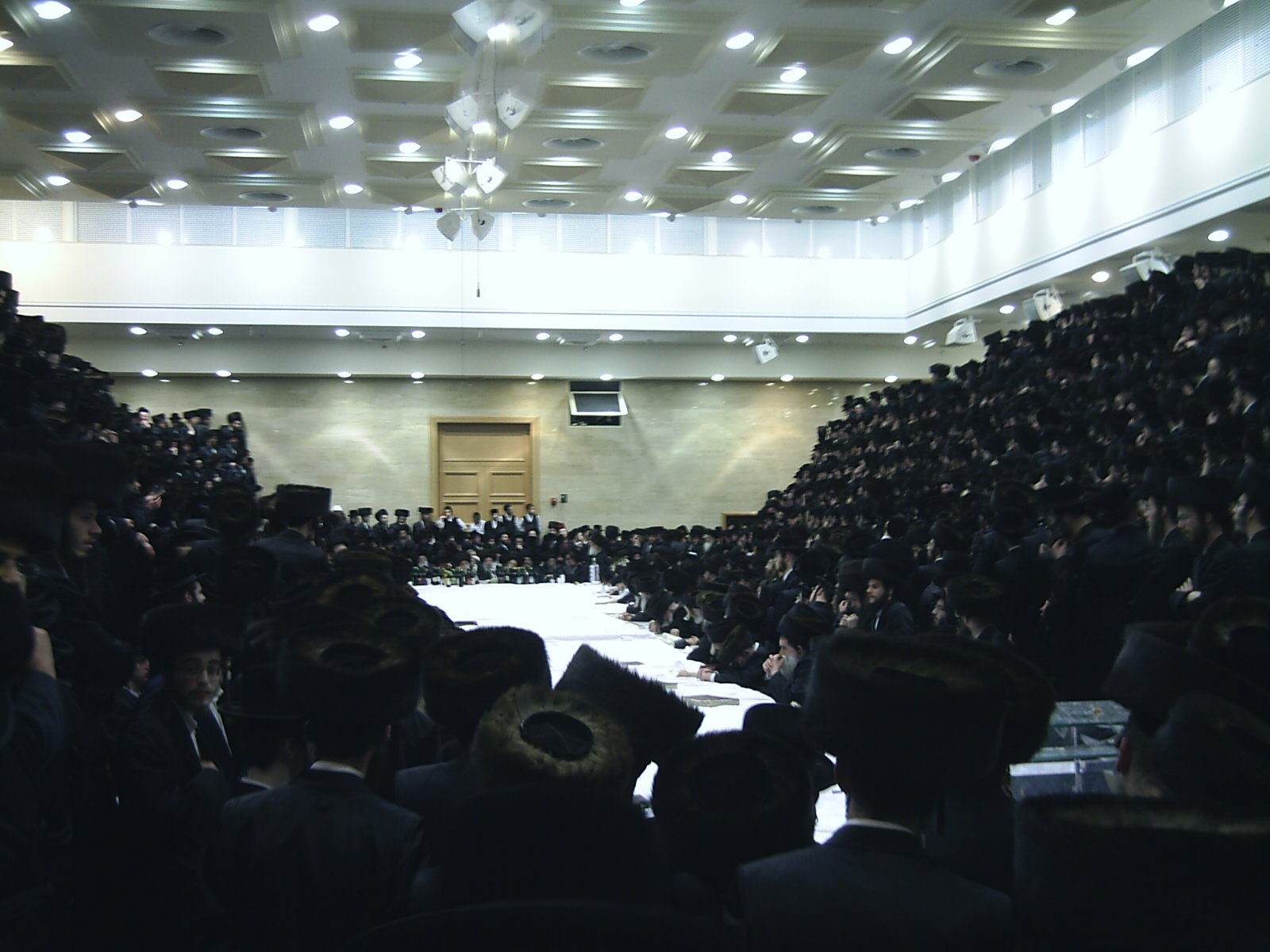
A Belzer tische, Purim 5766 (2006)

During a tische, the rebbe sits at the head of the table and the Hasidim gather around the table. In large Hasidic movements, only the rebbe and his immediate family, plus a few close disciples, partake of the actual meal, but small pieces of bread, fish, meat, poultry, farfel, beans, kugel, cake or fruit, as well as small cups of wine or other beverages, are distributed to all present as shirayim (שיריים, lit., remnants). In such large courts, there are often bleachers, known as parentches (פארענטשעס) in Yiddish, for observers of the tische to stand on. In smaller courts there is usually more food available for observers to partake. Often, in both large and small tischen, the rebbe will personally distribute shirayim food to individuals. Hasidim believe that the rebbe will have a personal blessing for each person who partakes of the food he gives them. Often the tische is accompanied by Niggunim, with speech not being the focus.

In some Hasidic movements, the rebbe only eats his Shabbat meals at the tische, often waiting many hours until the Hasidim have finished their meals to begin his meal with the recitation of the Kiddush prayer. In other courts, the rebbe begins his meal at home with his family, and then comes to join the Hasidim in the synagogue towards the end of the meal. In yet other courts, the entire tische is conducted after the meal has been finished at home. In such a case only dessert, usually consisting of kugel and fruit, is served, as well as soft drinks, usually seltzer-water. Such tisches are known as a Peiros Tische (פירות טיש) ("Fruit Tische").

The nature of the tische differs from group to group but during the tische, the Hasidim intently and silently watch the rebbe eating the meal and are extremely eager to receive shirayim ("leftovers"), cooked alongside the rebbe's courses, believing it to be a great merit (zechus) to eat something from the leftovers of a tzadik's meal. Many Hasidim claim that miracles can take place in merit of partaking of the shirayim, such as miraculous healing or blessings of wealth or piety.

Hasidic songs, or niggunim, are sung with great gusto. The songs may at times be either joyous or solemnly meditative. The rebbe may teach words of Torah, often mystical passages from the Midrash, Zohar, and the Kabbalah during the tische. He may also tell Hasidic stories, parables, and history. He may also give religious commentary on current events and politics.

Women do not sit with the men (because some communities of Orthodox Jews, especially Hasidim, are very strict about the gender separation) but they are often present to observe the tische from the ezras noshim ("women's section") in the main synagogue or hall where it is taking place. The women present do not sing aloud, and they usually do not receive the shirayim.

A tische can vary in size from a handful to thousands of people. Large tischen are usually held in special rooms in the main building of a Hasidic movement. Sometimes they are held in the main synagogue. Around the holidays, when thousands of Hasidim who live in other cities or countries come to pray and visit with their rebbe joining the Hasidim who live near the rebbe and things can get very crowded, they are sometimes held in a large temporary structure. Small tischen are often conducted in private homes, particularly when a Hasidic rebbe is visiting another community. As public events, non-Hasidic Jews and Hasidim of one rebbe may also visit the tische of another rebbe. Non-Jews sometimes visit a tische as well, particularly dignitaries and politicians, during a weekday tish such as on Chol HaMoed.

== Occasions ==
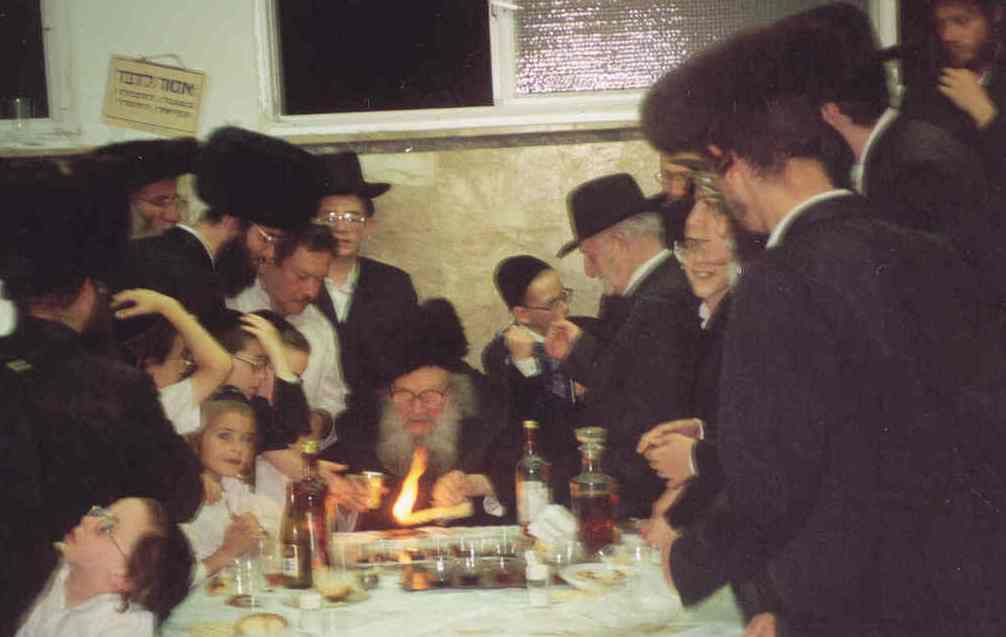
The yahrtzeit tische in Bnei Brak

A tische takes place at the meals in honor of the Shabbat, Jewish holidays, yahrzeit ("annual memorial") for previous rebbes of that dynasty, as a seudas hoda'ah (meal of thanksgiving) to God for past salvations (such as escape from prisons or from the Holocaust), or some other seudas mitzvah.

Some Hasidic movements hold a tische every Shabbat; others do so only on Jewish holidays. The time at which a tische can be held also differs. For example, Belzer Hasidim conduct their tische both late Friday night and on Saturday afternoon for Seudah Shlishit, while Gerrer Hasidim only have their tische on Saturday afternoon or early evening for Seudah Shlishit.

A tische is usually also held on minor holidays such as Lag BaOmer, Hanukkah, Purim, Tu Bishvat, on the minor days (Chol Hamoed) of major festivals Sukkos and Pesach, and before and after the fast of Yom Kippur.

== Related affairs ==
=== Botteh ===
Sometimes, a Hasidic gathering similar to a tische is conducted without the presence of a rebbe. This is called a botteh (באטע) in Yiddish or a shevet achim (שבת אחים) in Hebrew. It is often led by a rabbi who is not a rebbe, such as a Rosh Yeshivah, Mashgiach Ruchani, or a rebbe's son. Often, a botteh will be indistinguishable from a tische, for the respect that many Hasidim have for their rebbe's son is often very close to the reverence for the rebbe himself, as he is the assumed heir to the throne.

=== Farbrengen ===
Among Lubavitcher Hasidim, a gathering known as a farbrengen (Yiddish: פארברענגען, lit. 'gathering') is celebrated, similar to a tish. A farbrengen may be conducted with or without the presence of a rebbe, and even with the presence of only a few Hasidim. At a farbrengen, zemiros are generally not sung (with the exception of the zemiros of the Arizal for each Sabbath meal), but rather only niggunim.
