= Beit Hilkia =

Moshav in central Israel

Beit Hilkia: בֵּית חִלְקִיָּה (Hebrew)
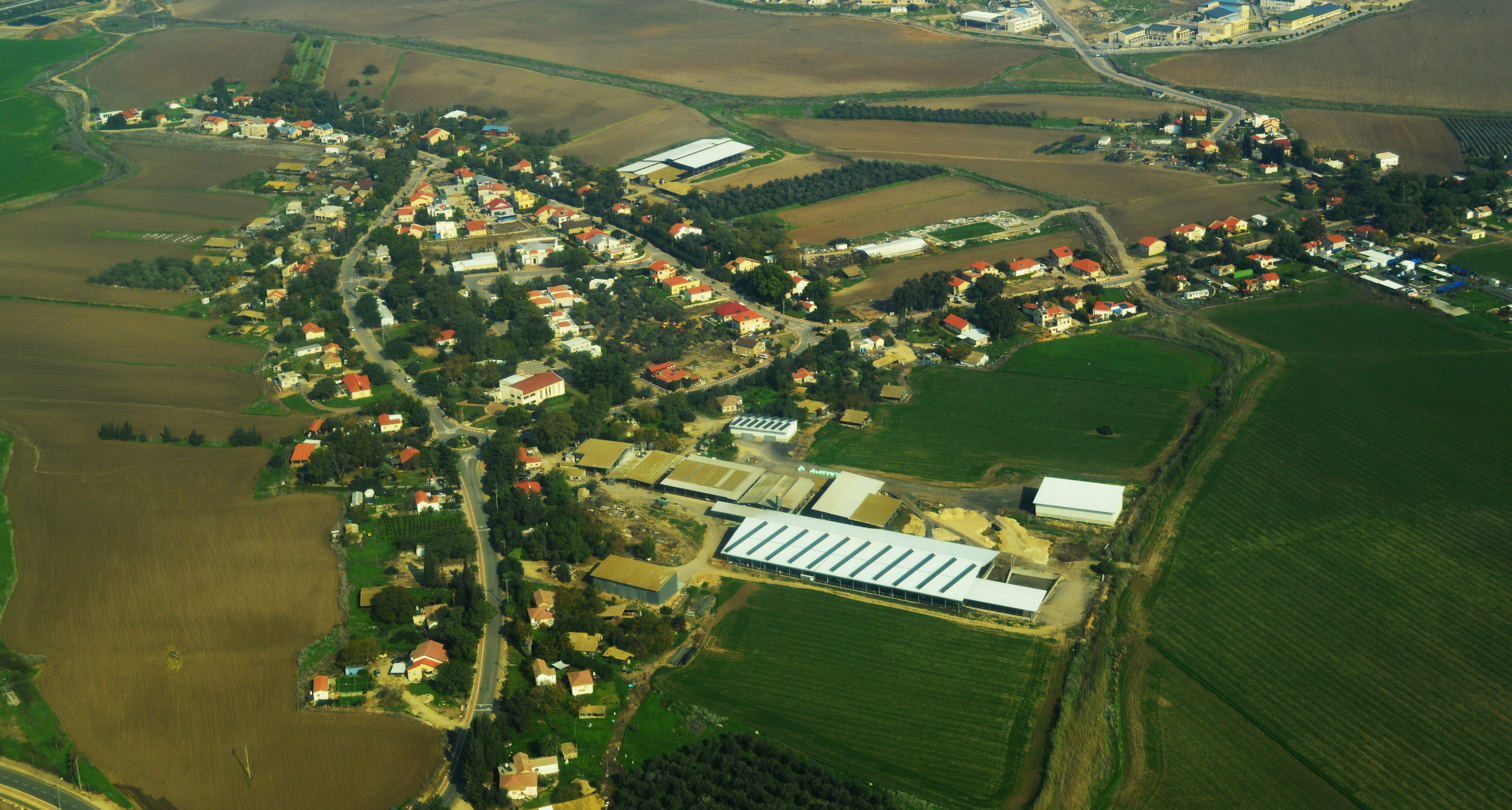

- Location within Central Israel Location within Israel
- Coordinates: 31°47′27″N 34°48′44″E
- Country: Israel
- District: Central
- Subdistrict: Rehovot
- Council: Nahal Sorek
- Affiliation: Poalei Agudat Yisrael
- Founded: 1953
- Founder: Former Jerusalem and ma'abarot residents
- Population (2024): 1,403

Beit Hilkia (Hebrew: בֵּית חִלְקִיָּה, lit. House of Hilkia) is a Haredi moshav in central Israel. Located in the Shephelah near Gedera, it falls under the jurisdiction of Nahal Sorek Regional Council. In 2024 it had a population of 1,403.

== History ==
The village was established in 1953 by former residents of Jerusalem and ma'abarot who wanted to combine a Haredi and agricultural lifestyle. It is named after Hilkia, the father of the prophet Jeremiah (Jeremiah 1:1).

It was established on land located near the depopulated Palestinian village of Al-Mukhayzin.

== Archaeology ==
In 2015, a salvage excavation brought to light a prehistoric site near Beit Hilkia and the Revivim quarry, with findings from the Pottery Neolithic (Yarmukian), Late Chalcolithic, and the Middle Bronze Age IIA–IIB. Somewhat surprising was the discovery of a typical Yarmukian-style fired clay figurine of a fertility goddess, the southernmost such finding. Of 163 found up to that date, the vast majority had been discovered in the main area known for its Yarmukian settlements, in and around the northern type-site of Sha'ar HaGolan, with just two exceptions further to the south. This new finding led to speculations that much of the Southern Levant might have been inhabited by a contiguous civilization during the time (c. 6400–6000 BCE), with differences in pottery types being more significant to today's archaeologists than to people living back then.
