= Premishlan (Hasidic dynasty) =

Ukrainian Hasidic dynasty

Premishlan is a Hasidic dynasty. It was founded by Grand Rabbi Meir Hagadol of Peremyshliany (Yiddish: פרעמישלאן, Premishlan)

== Dynasty ==
Grand Rabbi Israel Baal Shem Tov, founder of Hasidism

- The Great Grand Rabbi Meir Hagadol of Premishlan (1703–1773), a disciple of the Baal Shem Tov and a descendant of Hillel the Elder
  - Grand Rabbi Aharon Arye (Uren Leib) of Premishlan (died 1813), disciple of Rabbi Yechiel Michl of Zlotshov; son of Rabbi Meir the Great
    - Grand Rabbi Isaac of Kalish, son of Rabbi Uren Leib of Premishlan
    - Grand Rabbi Meir (Meirl) the Second of Premishlan (1783–1850), son of Rabbi Uren Leib, and the most famous rabbi of the dynasty. He was widely known as a 'miracle worker'.
      - Grand Rabbi Tzvi Frankel of Premishlan (son in law of Rabbi Meir the second)
        - Grand Rabbi Yisroel Aryeh Frankel of Premishlan, son of Rabbi Tzvi
          - Grand Rabbi Yisroal Arya Margulies of Pramishlan (Lviv-London); his father, Rabbi Efrayim Zalman was married to the daughter of Rabbi Yisroel Aryeh Frankel

== Current leadership ==
There are several Rebbes presently known as Premishlaner Rebbe; all from the Premishlan dynasty. Among these is Grand Rabbi Meir Rosenbaum of Premishlan, present Premishlaner Rebbe. His court is in Bnei Brak, Israel. He is the son of Grand Rabbi Dovid Moshe of Kretshnif Hasidic dynasty. There is also a Premishlaner synagogue in Lakewood, New Jersey led by Grand Rabbi Yisroel Arye Knopfler, a great-grandson of Rabbi Yisroel Arye Margulies.
