= Rosenbaum =

Rosenbaum is a surname of German origin, which translates as "rose tree" and which was given to people living in the proximity of rose bushes. The surname is common among Ashkenazi Jews, but is also associated with various non-Jews of German origin. Notable people with the surname include:

- Al Rosenbaum, American artist and cofounder of the Virginia Holocaust Museum
- Alexander Rosenbaum, Russian-Jewish bard from Saint Petersburg
- Alexis Rosenbaum, French essayist
- AnNa R., Andrea Neuenhofen, née Rosenbaum, German singer and songwriter
- Ayn Rand, born Alisa Zinov’yevna Rosenbaum, Russian-American writer and philosopher, founder of Objectivism
- Benjamin Rosenbaum, American science fiction writer
- Berta Rosenbaum Golahny, American painter
- Victor Borge, born Børge Rosenbaum, Danish comedian
- Bezalel Ronsburg, German rabbi also known as Daniel Rosenbaum
- Daniel Rosenbaum, American-Israeli basketball player
- Danny Rosenbaum, American baseball pitcher
- David Rosenbaum (journalist), American journalist
- David Rosenbaum (soccer), American soccer player
- Diane Rosenbaum, Oregon politician
- Edna Phillips, later Edna Phillips Rosenbaum, American harpist
- Edward Rosenbaum, American physician and author
- Eli Rosenbaum, director of the U.S. DOJ Office of Special Investigations
- Elyse Rosenbaum, American electrical engineer
- Enrico Rosenbaum, American songwriter
- Fred Rosenbaum, American author, historian
- Greg Rosenbaum, American merchant banker
- Helmut Rosenbaum, World War II German naval officer
- Isamar Rosenbaum, Hasidic rebbe
- Jacques Rosenbaum, Estonian architect
- James Rosenbaum, American sociology professor
- James M. Rosenbaum, American lawyer and judge
- James T. Rosenbaum American physician-scientist
- Joel Rosenbaum, American professor of cell biology
- John Rosenbaum, California artist
- Jonathan Rosenbaum, American film critic
- Jonathan Rosenbaum (scholar), American paleographer and college administrator
- Joseph Rosenbaum, fatally shot in the Kenosha unrest shooting in 2020
- Joseph Carl Rosenbaum, Austrian administrator
- Richard E. Hughes, born Leo Rosenbaum, American comic book author and editor
- Louise Rosskam, born Louise Rosenbaum, American photographer
- Marc Rosenbaum, American engineer
- Meyer Rosenbaum (I), Grand Rabbi of Kretchnif
- Meyer Rosenbaum (II), Chief Rabbi of Cuba
- Michael Rosenbaum, American actor
- Paul Rand, born Peretz Rosenbaum, American graphic designer
- Paul R. Rosenbaum, American statistician
- Polly Rosenbaum, American politician
- R. Robert Rosenbaum, television director for Bewitched
- Robert Abraham Rosenbaum (1915–2017) American mathematician, teacher and university administrator
- Robin S. Rosenbaum, American judge
- Ron Rosenbaum, American journalist and author
- Rosamund Bernier (née Rosamond Margaret Rosenbaum), lecturer and founder of the art magazine L'ŒIL
- Scott Rosenbaum, American screenwriter, producer and showrunner
- Simon Rosenbaum (statistician), British academic
- Simon Rosenbaum (baseball), American-Israeli baseball player
- Simon Rosenbaum (minister), Jewish activist
- Stephen Rosenbaum, American visual effects supervisor
- Steven Rosenbaum, American television producer
- Thane Rosenbaum, American novelist
- Therese Rosenbaum (1774–1837), Austrian opera singer
- Thomas Felix Rosenbaum, American physicist and president of the California Institute of Technology
- Tibor Rosenbaum, Hungarian-born Swiss rabbi and businessman
- Victor Rosenbaum, American pianist, conductor, and music educator
- Werner Rosenbaum, German hockey player
- Wilhelm Rosenbaum, German SS officer
- William Rosenbaum, American politician
- Yankel Rosenbaum, Australian Hasidic Jew murdered in the 1991 Crown Heights riot
- Zipora Rubin-Rosenbaum, Israeli paralympic athlete

== Fictional characters ==
- Mayor Rosenbaum, a character from Mona the Vampire
- Samuel Michelangelo Rosenbaum Yosemite Sam from Looney Tunes

== See also ==
- Rosenbaum House, a house built by Frank Lloyd Wright
- Rosenbaum Brothers Department Store, former American department store
- Willem Rooseboom, governor general of the Dutch East Indies
