= Meyer Rosenbaum =

Meyer Rosenbaum may refer to any of these three Hasidic rabbis:

- Grand Rabbi Meyer Rosenbaum (I) of Kretchnif, son of Rabbi Mordechai of Nadvorna
- Chief Rabbi Meyer Rosenbaum (II) Chief Rabbi of Cuba, son of Rabbi Issamar of Nadvorna
- See Kretshnif (Hasidic dynasty) for Grand Rabbi Meyer Rosenbaum (III), of Karakas, son of Rabbi Yitzchak Isaac of Zutshka
