= Strymba =

Rural locality in Ivano-Frankivsk Oblast, Ukraine

Strymba Стримба
- Village
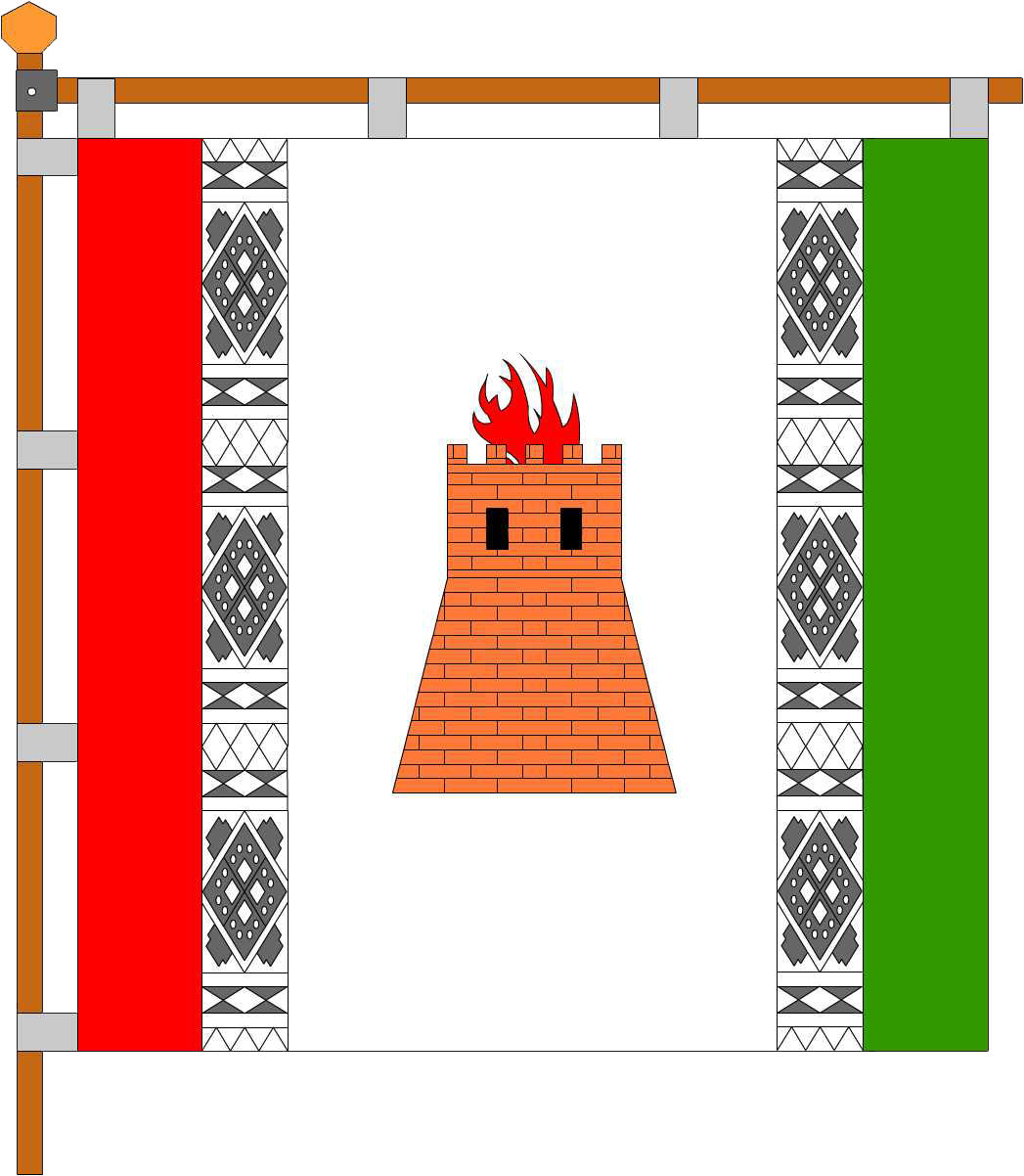
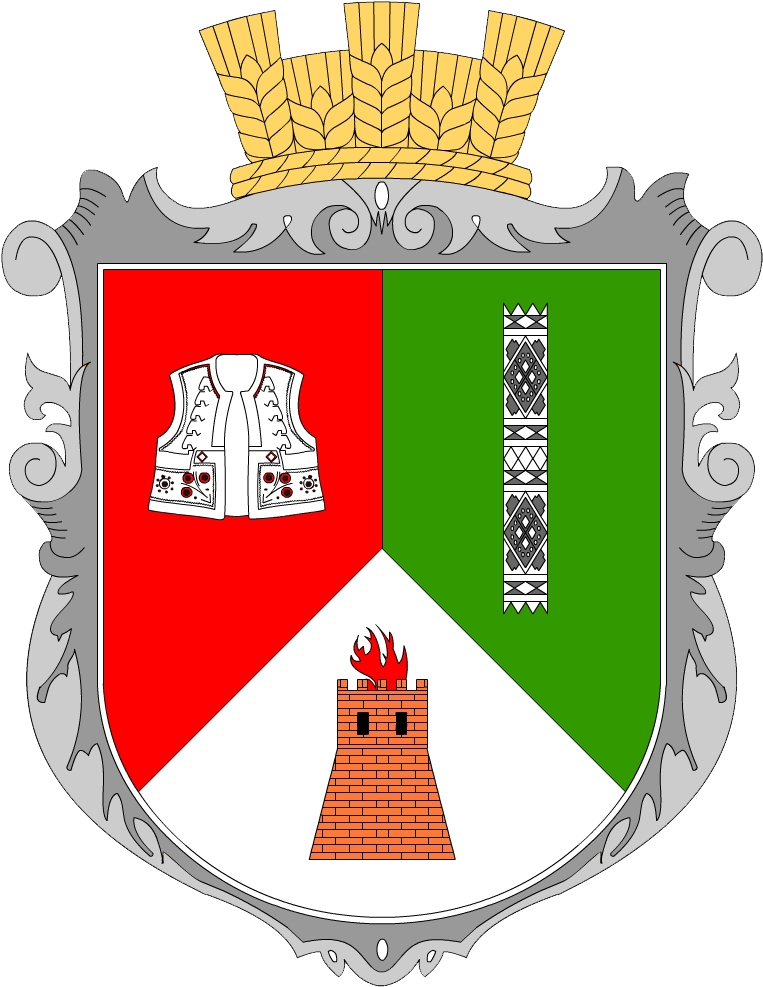
- Flag Coat of arms

- Location within Ivano-Frankivsk Oblast Location within Ukraine
- Coordinates: 48°35′53″N 24°34′41″E
- Country: Ukraine
- Oblast: Ivano-Frankivsk Oblast
- Raion: Nadvirna Raion
- Hromada: Nadvirna urban hromada
- Founded: 1596

Population
  - Total: 2,082

Strymba (Ukrainian: Стримба; Romanian: Strîmba) is a village located in Nadvirna Raion in Ivano-Frankivsk Oblast in western Ukraine. It belongs to Nadvirna urban hromada, one of the hromadas of Ukraine.

From the mid-14th century until 1772 (see Partitions of Poland) the village was part of the Kingdom of Poland. In 1772, it was annexed by the Habsburg Empire, and remained in the province of Galicia until late 1918. In the inter-war years, the borders changed and the town became part of the Second Polish Republic. Following the 1939 Invasion of Poland, it was annexed into the Ukrainian SSR (see also Molotov–Ribbentrop pact). The village was occupied by the Germans in 1941 during World War II. After the war it was once again absorbed into the Ukrainian SSR. Since its independence in 1991, the village has been part of Ukraine.

== See also ==
- Nadvorna (Hasidic dynasty)
