= Stanislov (Hasidic dynasty) =

Ukrainian Hasidic dynasty

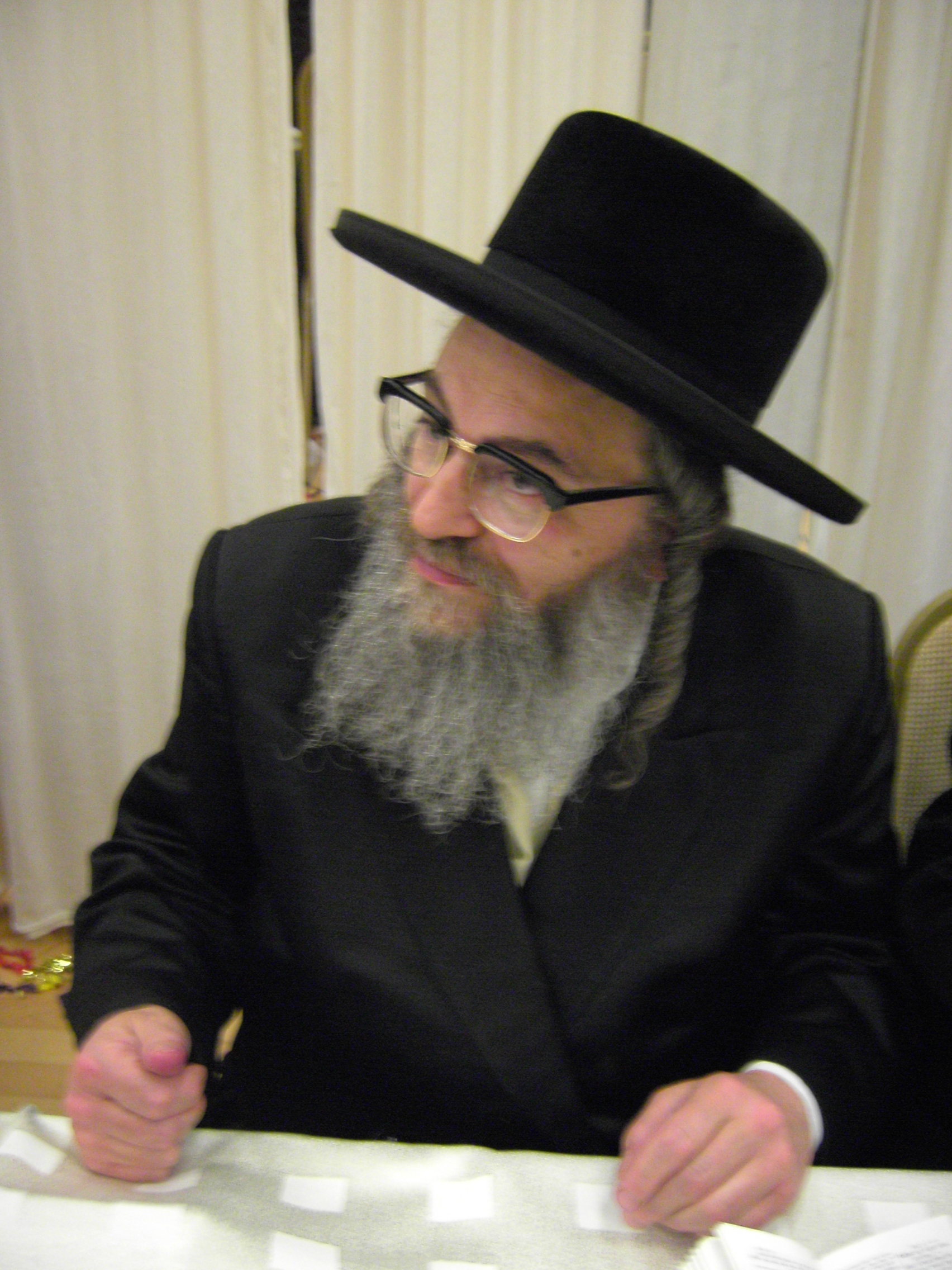
Rabbi Uri Ashkenasi, Stanislover Rebbe of London

The Stanislav hasidic dynasty was established in western Ukraine in a town now known as Ivano-Frankivsk. The town used to be called Stanisławów and is still known in Yiddish as Stanislav.

The dynasty's founders were the descendants of Rabbi Chanoch Henoch Dov Mayer, first Rebbe of Alesk, son-in-law of Rabbi Sholom Rokeach of Belz.

Arriving in London after surviving the Holocaust, Rabbi Meshulem Yisosschor Ashkenazi, born in 1905, became known as the Stanislav-Alesker Rebbe. He was a descendant of the Chacham Zvi.

After his death on 6 November 1994, his son, Rabbi Uri Ashkenazi, became the Stanislaver Rebbe of London. He was a well-known mohel and had a Beth midrash in Stamford Hill at 93 Lordship Park, London. He died on 26 March 2020 of coronavirus at the age of 76.

== Additional dynasty ==
There is an additional Hasidic dynasty known as the Stanislov dynasty of Monsey, New York. The previous Stanislover Rebbe of Monsey was Rabbi Yisroel Rosenbaum, (1931–2009), a scion of the Nadvorna dynasty.

Rabbi Yisroel Rosenbaum was asked by his grandfather, Rabbi Isomor of Nadvorna, to establish a beis medrash in memory of his brother-in-law (and Rabbi Yisroel's uncle), Rabbi Chaim Leifer of Stanislov, son of Rabbi Yitzchok Leifer of Stanislov, son of Rabbi Mordechai of Nadvorna.

=== Children of Rabbi Yisroel Rosenbaum ===
==== Sons ====
- Rabbi Eliezer Zvi, Linsker Rebbe
- Rabbi Yesochor Dov Berel, Stanislover Rav
- Rabbi Moshe, Stanislover Rebbe in Beitar Illit
- Rabbi Yehudah Rosenbaum

==== Daughters ====
- Rebbetzin Rosenbaum, married to Rabbi Yosef Shlomo Rosenbaum, Kretchnifer Rebbe of Monsey
- Rebbetzin Horonchik
- Rebbetzin Malky Goldstein, married to Rabbi Yaakov Leib Goldstein, son of Rabbi Rafael Goldstein, Skolya Rebbe
