= Nadvorna =

Nadvorna may refer to:

- Nadvirna (also spelled Nadvorna), a city located in the Ivano-Frankivsk Oblast in southwestern Ukraine
- Nadvorna (Hasidic dynasty), a Hasidic rabbinical dynasty within Orthodox Judaism
