= Joseph Robertson (OHSU) =

American ophthalmologist

Joseph E. Robertson, Jr.

4th President of Oregon Health & Science University
- Incumbent
- Assumed office 2006
- Preceded by: Peter O. Kohler

Personal details
- Born: Brownstown, Indiana
- Spouse: Patricia
- Children: 2
- Education: Yale University (BS); Indiana University (MD); University of Oregon (MBA)
- Profession: Ophthalmologist
- Salary: $811,252 (2009-10)

Joseph E. Robertson Jr. is an American ophthalmologist who was the president of Oregon Health & Science University in Portland, Oregon from September 2006 to July 2018.

== Education ==
Robertson received a Bachelor of Science degree in neuroscience at Yale University in 1974. He attended medical school at the Indiana University School of Medicine in Indianapolis, receiving an M.D. degree in 1978.

He completed his residency in ophthalmology at Oregon Health Sciences University (now Oregon Health & Science University). He completed a fellowship in vitreoretinal surgery at the combined program of Oregon Health Sciences University and Devers Eye Institute. In 1997, he received a master's degree in business administration from the University of Oregon's Executive M.B.A. Program. In addition to his academic career experience, he has one year of private practice experience.

== Career ==
Robertson has been on the OHSU faculty for his entire career except for one year in private practice. Later he became chairman of the Department of Ophthalmology and Director of the Casey Eye Institute, taking over from Frederick Fraunfelder.

During his tenure as Dean, the entering class size in the medical education program increased from 100 to 120 students. OHSU has partnered with the University of Oregon and the PeaceHealth System to expand medical education in Eugene and Springfield, and with other state universities to increase the number of physicians in Oregon and to address the issue of maldistribution of providers. Robertson became dean of the OHSU School of Medicine in 2003, and in September 2006 became the fourth president of Oregon Health & Science University.

Robertson specialises in vitreoretinal surgery, with research interests in ocular trauma, diabetic retinopathy, retinopathy of prematurity and other proliferative retinal diseases, and the development of new surgical techniques. His basic science research focused on the pathophysiology and cellular events related to vitreoretinopathy. He participated in numerous clinical trials, including acting as co-principal investigator of the fundus photography reading center for a major clinical trial investigating cryotherapy as a treatment for retinopathy of prematurity. He served as a treating or examining investigator in multiple trials funded by both the NEI and industry. Robertson's other professional interests include the development of healthcare delivery systems and the application of cost accounting principles to medical practice, with the goal of improving the cost-effectiveness of care. Robertson has written numerous peer-reviewed articles and book chapters.

During Robertson's tenure as the university President, the Portland Aerial Tram went into service. The tramway was built to connect the main OHSU campus with university land in the South Waterfront District near the Willamette River with the OHSU Center for Health & Healing and the land deeded to OHSU for further development for a second educational campus. The tramway was the proposed solution to link the two locations.

Construction began in 2011 on the Collaborative Life Sciences Building on the waterfront. The building will house shared programs for OHSU and several other Oregon University System schools.

Robertson is a member of the nine-member Oregon Health Policy Board (OHPB), the policy-making and oversight body for the Oregon Health Authority. OHPB was established through House Bill 2009, signed by the Governor in June 2009. Board members are nominated by the Governor and must be confirmed by the Senate. Board members serve a four-year term of office. The Board is responsible for implementing health care reform provisions.

Robertson's final salary prior to his 2017 retirement was US$1,563,517. Robertson, now retired, receives a monthly pension of $83,124.

== Family life ==
Robertson was born near a small town in the hills of Southern Indiana. He married Dr. Margaret Hewitt in 1976, after they met in medical school. They had two children, Katie and C.J., and were married until 1999. He now lives with his second wife, Patricia.
