= Cleveland (Hasidic dynasty) =

American and Israeli Hasidic dynasties

The residence and shul of the first Clevelander Rebbe on Massie Avenue.

The Matzeiva (gravestone) of first Clevelander Rebbe, Rabbi Meir Leifer.

Grand Rabbi Yehoshua Heshel Rosenbaum of Cleveland-New York Rebbe

There are two Hasidic Jewish dynasties known as Cleveland and both are considered to be a part of the Nadvorna dynasty.

== History of the Clevelander New York dynasty ==
The Cleveland Hasidic dynasty currently located in Williamsburg, New York, was founded by Grand Rabbi Meir Leifer, who died in Los Angeles, California, in 1941. The first Clevelander Rebbe was the author of Oros Hameirim, Likitei Amorim, and Hakufes Nadvorne. He was a scion of the Nadvorna Hasidic dynasty. He also was a disciple of Rabbi Moshe Greenwald of Chust, author of Arugas Habosem. He founded the current synagogue in Williamsburg in 1934 after he moved there from Cleveland, Ohio, making it currently the oldest Hasidic dynasty in Williamsburg. Reb Meir came to US in 1922, and settled in Cleveland, where he was the first rabbi of Congregation Bnei Yaakov Anshei Marmorish (currently known as the Green Road Synagogue Beis Ha Knesseth Shearis Hapleita Bnei Yaakov Kehilas Marmorsh), Glenville and later he founded the congregations Shomrei Shabbos, and Shomer Hadass Yisroel. Prior to living in the US, Reb Meir lived in Budapest, Hungary, where he led a large following.

Reb Meir was succeeded by his son-in-law, Grand Rabbi Usher Mordechai Rosenbaum, author of Sifsei Riem, and Amoirois Tehoirois. In 1962 Reb Usher Mordechai founded the Clevelander yeshiva under the name of Yeshivas Bnei Mordechai. In 1981 the yeshiva was renamed Yeshivas Bnei Yisachar Ber. Reb Usher Mordechai also founded a kollel under the name of Kollel Yad Issumer. Reb Usher Mordechai died in 1991; he was succeeded by his son, the present Clevelander Rebbe, Grand Rabbi Yehoshua Heshel Rosenbaum.

=== European lineage ===
- Grand Rabbi Meir the Great of Premishlan (1703–1773), disciple of the Baal Shem Tov
  - Grand Rabbi Uren Arye Leib of Premishlan (died 1813) disciple of Rabbi Yechiel Michl of Zlotshov; son of Rabbi Meir the Great,
    - Grand Rabbi Isaac of Kalish, son of Rabbi Uren Arye Leib of Premishlan
      - Grand Rabbi Yisachar Dov "Bertchi" Leifer of Nadvorna (died 1848), author of Sisrei Torah, son of Rabbi Isaac of Kalish; disciple of Rabbi Isaac of Radvill; son-in-law of Rabbi Avrohom Leib Bloch of Nadvorna
        - Grand Rabbi Mordechai Leifer of Nadvorna (1835–1894), author of Maamar Mordechai, son of Rabbi Bertchi
          - Grand Rabbi Yisachar Bertchi Leifer of Nadvorna-Satmar (died 1906), author of Likitei Yissachar, son of Rabbi Mordechai of Nadvorna

=== The Clevelander New York lineage ===
- Grand Rabbi Meyer Leifer of Cleveland, son of Rabbi Yisachar Bertchi of Nadvorna-Satmar, author of Oros Hameirim, son-in-law of Rabbi Alter Zev Horowitz of Stryzov
  - Grand Rabbi Usher Mordechai Rosenbaum, author of The Sifsei Riem, son-in-law of Rabbi Meyer Leifer of Cleveland, and son of Rabbi Yisachar Ber of Stroznhitz
    - Grand Rabbi Yehoshua Heshel Rosenbaum is the present Clevelander Rebbe of New York.

== History of the Clevelander Ra'anana Dynasty ==
The other is currently located in Ra'anana, Israel founded by Grand Rabbi Isaac Rosenbaum (d. 2020), Clevelander Rebbe, also a scion of the Nadvorna Hasidic dynasty

=== Origins of Clevelander Ra'anana Dynasty ===
- Grand Rabbi Meir the Great of Premishlan (1703–1773), disciple of the Baal Shem Tov
  - Grand Rabbi Uren Arye Leib of Premishlan (died 1813) disciple of Rabbi Yechiel Michl of Zlotshov; son of Rabbi Meir the Great,
    - Grand Rabbi Isaac of Kalish, son of Rabbi Uren Arye Leib of Premishlan
      - Grand Rabbi Yisachar Dov "Bertchi" Leifer of Nadvorna (died 1848), author of Sisrei Torah, son of Rabbi Isaac of Kalish; disciple of Rabbi Isaac of Radvill; son-in-law of Rabbi Avrohom Leib Bloch of Nadvorna
        - Grand Rabbi Mordechai Leifer of Nadvorna (1835–1894), author of Maamar Mordechai, son of Rabbi Bertchi
          - Grand Rabbi Meir Rosenbaum of Nadvorna-Kretshniff (died 1908), son of Rabbi Mordechai Leifer (changed last name to Rosenbaum), son in law of Rabbi Yechiel Michel Tirer of Drohey
            - Grand Rabbi Issamar Rosenbaum of Nadvorna Known as "Ha'admor Hazaken MiNadvorna" (1886–1973), son of Rabbi Meir of Kretshniff, son-in-law of Grand Rabbi Isaiah Rubin of Kolbosov
              - Grand Rabbi Yisachar Ber Rosenbaum of Stroznhitz, author of Divrei Yisachar (d. 1980), son of Rabbi Issamar Rosenbaum of Nadvorna, son-in-law of Rabbi Yisachar Bertchi Leifer of Nadvorna-Satmar
- Grand Rabbi Isaac Rosenbaum, of Cleveland Ra'anana the son Rabbi Yisachar Ber Rosenbaum of Stroznhitz (d. 2020)
  - Grand Rabbi Uri Leib HaKohen Rosebaum – adopted son of Rebbe Isaac – current Clevelander Rebbe
