= Simon Rosenbaum =

Simon Rosenbaum may refer to:

- Simon Rosenbaum (baseball) (born 1993), American-Israeli baseball first baseman
- Simon Rosenbaum (minister) (1860–1934), Jewish politician in the Russian Empire and Lithuania
- Simon Rosenbaum (statistician) (1877–?), British statistician
