= Legacy Devers Eye Institute =

Ophthalmology center in Portland, Oregon

- Type: not-for-profit healthcare, not-for-profit research
- Industry: Healthcare
- Founded: 1959
- Founder: Arthur Devers
- Headquarters: Portland, Oregon

The Legacy Devers Eye Institute in Portland, Oregon, is one of the few private, non-profit centers for ophthalmological care, research, and training in the United States. The institute is affiliated with Legacy Health, a network of seven hospitals in Portland and Southwest Washington. Legacy Devers includes the Thelma and Gilbert Schnitzer Comprehensive Glaucoma Center.

== Mission ==
The institute offers fee-for-service and charitable eye care. Part of its mission is to provide universal eye care in the Portland, Oregon, area.

The institute also trains post-graduate professionals and conducts research. Scientists from Devers have refined how to interpret visual field testing, a standard part of the assessment of glaucoma. They have also improved corneal transplantation through innovations in DLEK (deep lamellar endothelial keratoplasty) and DSEK (Descemet's stripping with endothelial keratoplasty).

== History and funding ==
The Devers Eye Institute was founded in 1959 thanks to a million-dollar bequest from Arthur Devers, a coffee merchant who suffered from retinal degeneration.

Good Samaritan Hospital hired Dr. Richard Chenoweth in 1972 as the first Chief of Ophthalmology. He was the first to publish on retinal toxicity secondary to gentamicin (a common antibiotic), acute placoid chorioretinitis from syphilis, and neuroretinopathy from intravenous contrast media. He helped develop ground-breaking treatments for diabetic retinopathy and retinal disease. He retired in 1990. He died in 2020.

The second Chief of Ophthalmology and first holder of the Chenoweth Chair was Dr. Edward Michael Van Buskirk, appointed in 1990. He helped understand the vascular effects of glaucoma medications and how decreased blood flow may relate to glaucoma. He was the President of the American Glaucoma Society and inaugural Editor-in-Chief of the Journal of Glaucoma. He helped to pioneer the understanding of laser trabeculoplasty, a common treatment for glaucoma today. In 2001 the Good Samaritan Foundation established the Edward Michael Van Buskirk chair for ocular research in his honor.

The third Chief of Ophthalmology and second holder of the Chenoweth Chair was George A. “Jack” Cioffi, M.D, appointed in 2004.

The fourth Chief of Ophthalmology was James T. Rosenbaum. He is now chief emeritus.

The current Chief and holder of the Chenoweth Chair is Steve Mansberger, M.D., M.P.H.

In 2007, the Schnitzer/Novack Foundation gave the Institute one million dollars to endow the Thelma and Gilbert Schnitzer Comprehensive Glaucoma Center.

The Institute's total endowment is now approximately twenty-five million dollars, held primarily by the Legacy Health Good Samaritan Foundation. Part of its research activity is supported through grants from the National Institutes of Health.

== Staff and alumni ==
The Devers Eye Institute staff includes fourteen ophthalmologists, four physician fellows, two clinical optometrists, and four additional senior scientists performing research. The Discoveries in Sight Research Laboratory is headed by Brad Fortune, OD, PhD who succeeds Claude Burgoyne, M.D., 2015 winner of the American Glaucoma Society Clinician Scientist Award. The clinics are directed by Steve Mansberger, M.D., M.P.H., epidemiology section editor for the American Journal of Ophthalmology. The cornea service is headed by Mike Straiko, M.D., who is the inaugural recipient of the Mark Terry Chair of Corneal Research. Dr. Mark Terry was the 2016 recipient of the Eye Bank Association of America R. Townley Paton Award.

Notable former staff and graduates of the training program include—

- Jack Cioffi, Edward S. Harkness Professor of Ophthalmology, Columbia University
- Roger A. Dailey, Lester Jones Professor of Oculoplastic and Reconstructive Surgery at Oregon Health & Science University and President emeritus of the American Society of Ophthalmic Plastic and Reconstructive Surgery
- J. Crawford Downs, Vice-Chair of Ophthalmology Research, University of Alabama at Birmingham
- Joseph Robertson, past president of the Oregon Health & Science University
- Ian A. Sigal, Assistant Professor, University of Pittsburgh
- J. Timothy Stout, Chief of Ophthalmology, Baylor College of Medicine
- Michael Straiko, innovative corneal transplant surgeon
- Peter Veldman, corneal transplant surgeon and Associate Professor of Ophthalmology and Visual Science at the University of Chicago.
- Ahmad M.Alshaarawy, a former cornea research fellow, now a practicing cornea surgeon at the Research Institute of Ophthalmology, Egypt, and Cornea Clinic; a private center.
