= James T. Rosenbaum =

American physician-scientist (born 1949)

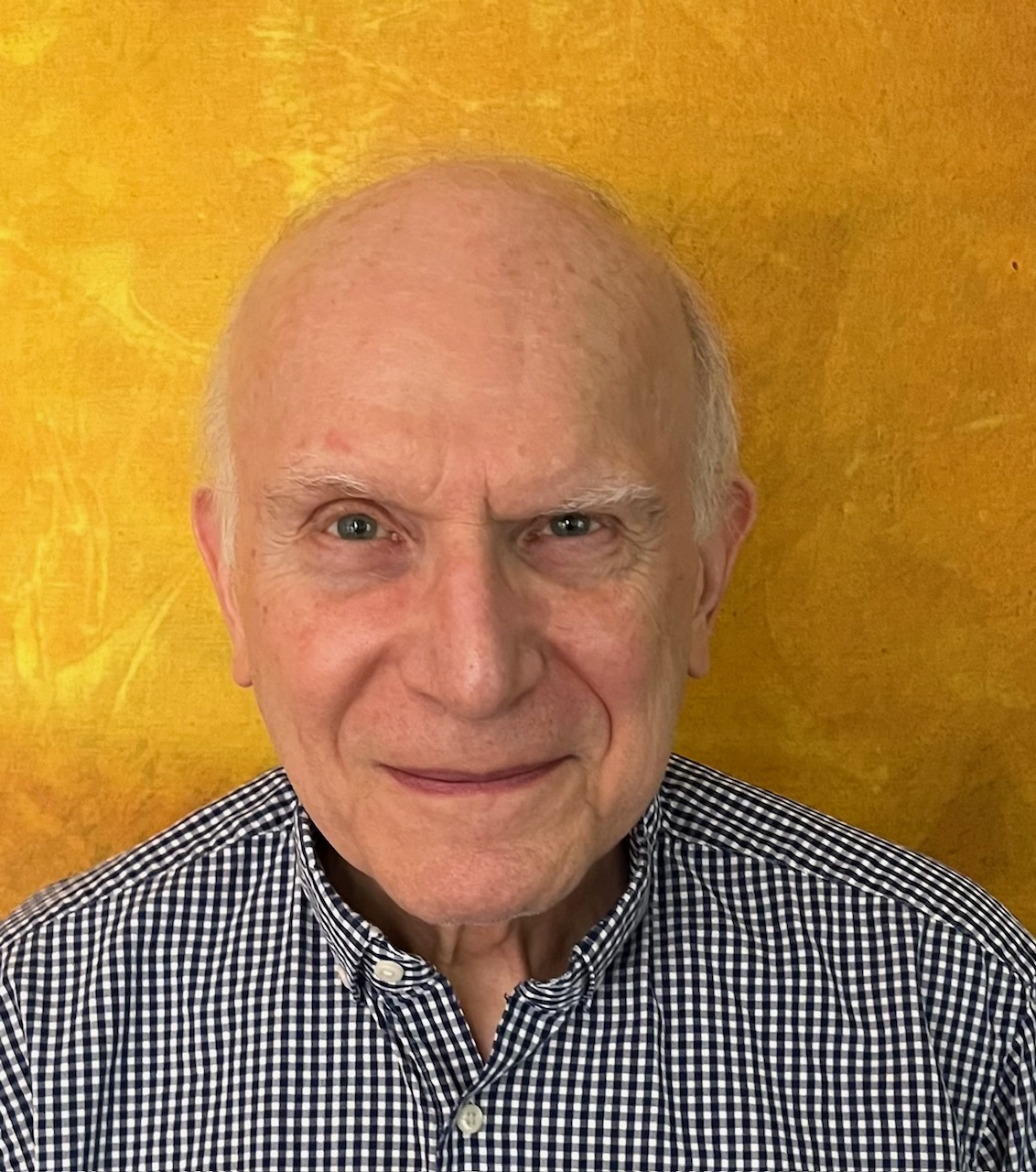
- Born: September 29, 1949 (age 77); Portland, Oregon, U.S.A.
- Education: Yale University (MD); Harvard University (AB)
- Occupations: Physician, scientist
- Known for: Research into inflammatory diseases of the eye
- Spouse(s): Sandra J. Lewis, MD
- Children: Lisa S. Rosenbaum, MD & Jennifer L. Rosenbaum, MD
- Father: Edward Rosenbaum, MD

James T. Rosenbaum (born September 29, 1949) is an American physician-scientist who is Chief of Ophthalmology emeritus at the Legacy Devers Eye Institute, Portland, Oregon, where he held the Richard Chenoweth Chair. Rosenbaum was the only practicing rheumatologist/non-ophthalmologist in the world to serve as a chief of ophthalmology.

He is recognized for his description of an animal model of uveitis (inflammation inside the eye) resulting from injection of bacterial endotoxin and for more than 600 scholarly publications, mostly related to the intersection between rheumatology and ophthalmology. He is a co-author of the book, "The Clinical Neurology of Rheumatic Diseases".

He is also the author of an illustrated children's book, Eleanor and Geraldine.

== Education ==
Rosenbaum is a National Merit Scholar who graduated from Harvard College in 1971, magna cum laude. He graduated from Yale Medical School with honors in 1975. He did an internship and residency in internal medicine at Stanford Medical Center from 1975 to 1978. He was a fellow of the Arthritis Foundation under the supervision of Hugh O. McDevitt at Stanford from 1978 to 1981.

== Career ==
From July 1981 to September 1983, he was on the faculty of the University of California San Francisco Medical School.

From September 1983 to August 1985, he was Director of the Kuzell Institute for Arthritis Research, California Pacific Medical Center, San Francisco.

From September 1985 through June 2022, he was on the faculty of the Oregon Health & Science University. He rose to become Chief of Arthritis and Rheumatic Diseases and held the Edward E Rosenbaum Professorship in Inflammation Research.

In September 2012 he concurrently became Chief of Ophthalmology at the Legacy Devers Eye Institute, taking emeritus status in August 2019.

From July 2022 until January 2025, he served as Senior Vice President for Research at Corvus Pharmaceuticals.

== Family ==
Rosenbaum is part of a notable family that includes eleven physicians including his father, Edward E Rosenbaum, author of "A Taste of My Own Medicine: When the Doctor Is the Patient". His maternal grandmother was Rose Naftalin.

== Honors ==
Rosenbaum is an elected member of the American Society of Clinical Investigation and the Association of American Physicians. He was given a lifetime achievement award from the American Academy of Ophthalmology. He was awarded the Friedenwald Award from the Association for Research in Vision and Ophthalmology in 2011, the Gold Medal from the International Uveitis Study Group Eye Foundation in 2012, the Cless Award from the University of Illinois, Chicago in 2012, and the American College of Rheumatology Distinguished Clinician Scholar Award in 2013.

He has twice won Innovative Research Awards from the Rheumatology Research Foundation (2017 and 2022). The Spondylitis Association of America named him volunteer physician of the year in 2021. The American College of Rheumatology gave him a Distinguished Service Award in 2022. The International Uveitis Study Group named him the inaugural winner of the Manfred Zeirhut Teaching Award in 2024.

His first-authored papers or essays have appeared in journals that include Science, Nature, the New England Journal of Medicine, JAMA, Annals of Internal Medicine, the Archives of Internal Medicine and the online source for physicians, UpToDate.
