= Nadvirna urban hromada =

Urban hromada in Ivano-Frankivsk Oblast, Ukraine

Nadvirna urban hromada Надвірнянська міська громада
- Hromada
- Seal
- Interactive map of Nadvirna urban hromada
- Country: Ukraine
- Oblast: Ivano-Frankivsk
- Raion: Nadvirna

Area
  - Total: 190.8 km^{2} (73.7 sq mi)

Population (2023)
  - Total: 43,065
  - Density: 225.7/km^{2} (584.6/sq mi)
- Settlements: 13
- Cities: 1
- Villages: 12
- Website: nadvirnamr.gov.ua (Archived)

Nadvirna urban territorial hromada (Ukrainian: Надвірнянська міськатериторіальна громада, romanized: Nadvirnianska miska terytorialna hromada) is a hromada in Ukraine, located within the western Ivano-Frankivsk Oblast's Nadvirna Raion. Its administrative centre is the city of Nadvirna.

The hromada has an area of 190.8 km^{2} (73.7 mi^{2}). It also has a population of 43,065 (as of 2023).

== Settlements ==
In addition to one city (Nadvirna), Nadvirna urban hromada contains 12 villages:

- Verkhnii Maidan
- Hvizd
- Krasna
- Lisna Velesnytsia
- Lisna Tarnovytsia
- Loieva
- Myrne
- Mlyny
- Molodkiv
- Nazavyziv
- Paryshche
- Strymba
