= Isamar Rosenbaum =

American rabbi

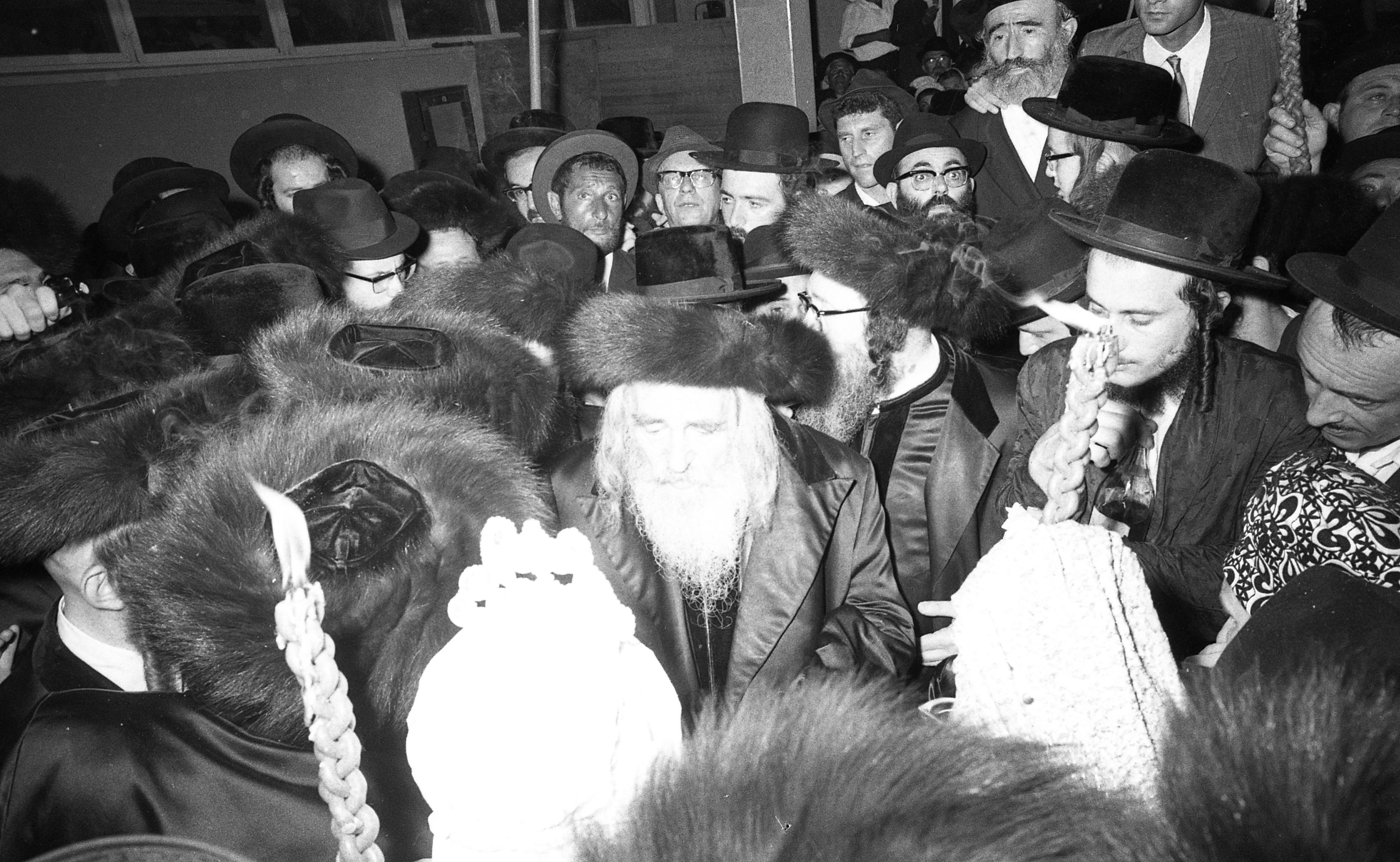
- Rosenbaum at his daughter's wedding
- Title: Nadvorna Rebbe

Personal life
- Born: Issamar Rosenbaum; 1886 Milișăuți, Duchy of Bukovina, Austria-Hungary
- Died: 1973 (aged 86–87)
- Buried: Mount of Olives
- Spouse: Malka Rubin
- Children: Rabbi Chaim Mordechai Rosenbaum (1903-1976) Yesochor Ber Rosenbaum (1905-1981) Rabbi Yitzchok Isaac Rosenbaum (1908-2000) Rabbi Meir Rosenbaum Rabbi Asher Yeshaya Rosenbaum Rebbetzin Isaacson (wife of Rabbi Meir Isaacson) Rebbetzin Leifer (wife of Rabbi Avrohom Aba Leifer) Rebbetzin Rachel Shapiro (1902 - June 30, 2007)
- Parent: Meyer Rosenbaum (father)
- Dynasty: Nadvorna

Religious life
- Religion: Judaism

Jewish leader
- Predecessor: Meyer Rosenbaum
- Began: 1902
- Ended: 1973
- Dynasty: Nadvorna

Isamar Rosenbaum (1886–1973) was a Hasidic rebbe of the Hasidic dynasties of Nadvorna and Kretshnif. He was the son of Rabbi Meyer Rosenbaum (1852 - June 29 1908) of Kretshniff, who in turn was a son of Rabbi Mordechai of Nadvorna (1824–1894).

Rosenbaum became a rebbe at the age of fifteen and, at his father's behest, moved to Czernowitz where he served as a chasidic rebbe. In the Nadvorna dynasty, all children of the rebbes open their own chasidic courts, even during their fathers' lifetime. His wife, Malka, was the daughter of Rebbe Usher Yeshaya Rubin of Kolbuszowa, Galicia.

His family was the only chasidic family of grand rabbis known to have all survived the Nazi camps with the whole family intact.

His wife died in 1969 and was buried in Tveria. In 1970, three years before his death, he moved from the Washington Heights neighborhood of Manhattan to Yad Eliyahu in Tel Aviv, Israel.

At the time of his death, he was one of the longest living chassidic rebbes in history; he was known as the Admor Hazaken miNadvorna, or "Elder Rebbe of Nadvorna".

He died at the age of 86 in 1973 and was buried on the Mount of Olives.

All his sons and sons-in-law, were chasidic rebbes, with the sole exception of his son Rabbi Meyer Rosenbaum, who was the Chief Rabbi of Cuba and Mexico, and a prolific author of scholarly works, including Torah LeOhr Hatekufah.

Preceded by Rabbi Meyer Rosenbaum of Kretchniff	Rebbe of Nadvorna; 1902–1973	Succeeded by Grand Rabbi Chaim Mordechai of Nadvorna; Grand Rabbi Yesochor Ber of Strozhnitz; Grand Rabbi Yitzchok Isaac of Zutshka; Grand Rabbi Asher Yeshaya of Nadvorna-Chadera
