= Nazavyziv =

Rural locality in Ivano-Frankivsk Oblast, Ukraine

Nazavyziv Назавизів
- Village
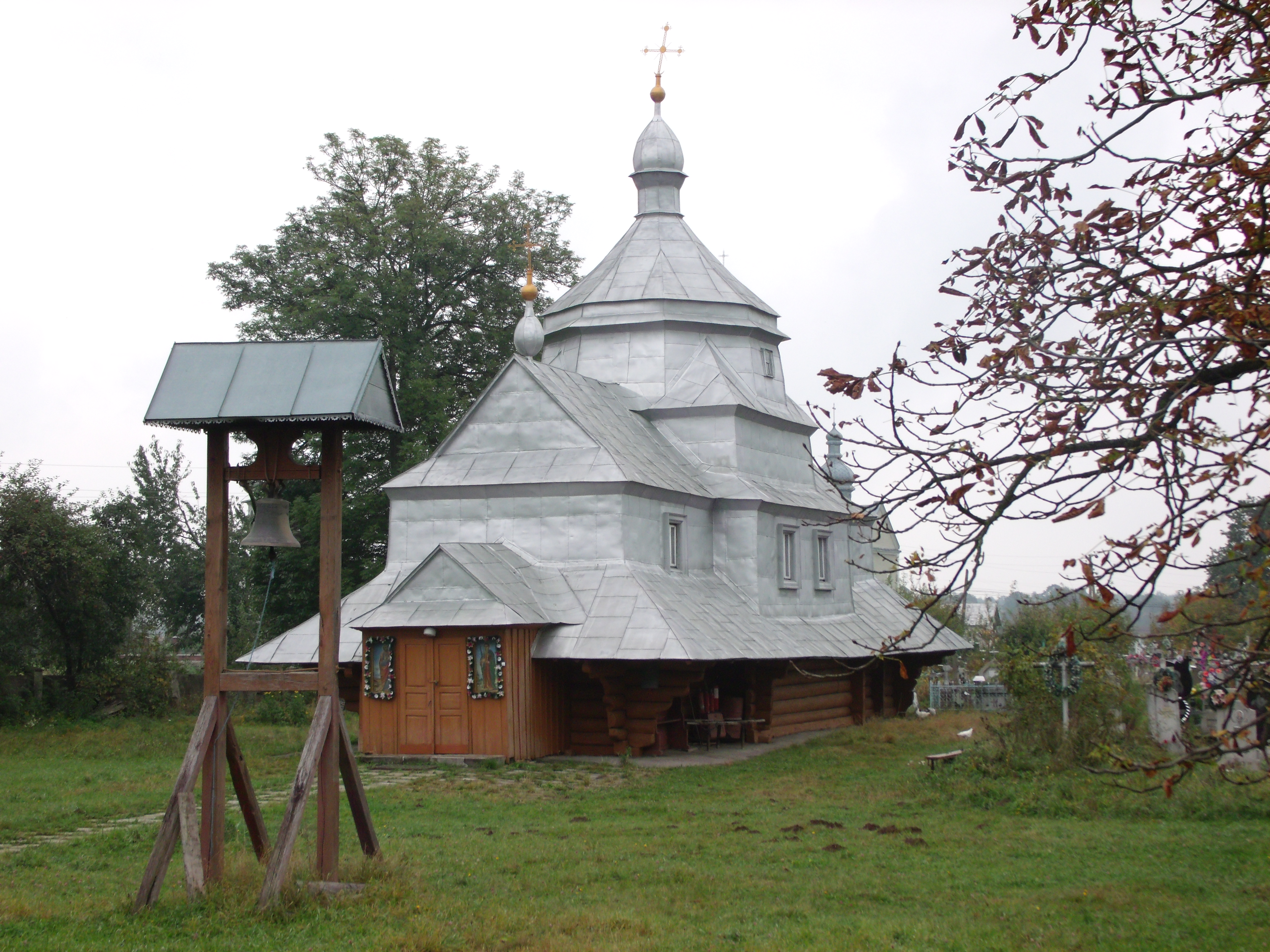
- Church of John the Baptist

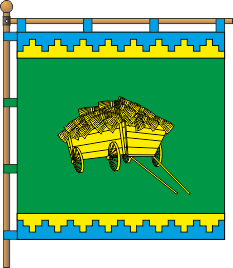
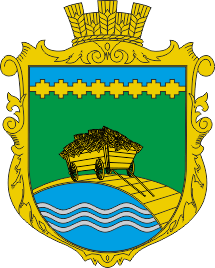
- Flag Coat of arms

- Location within Ivano-Frankivsk Oblast Location within Ukraine
- Coordinates: 48°40′11″N 24°35′48″E
- Country: Ukraine
- Oblast: Ivano-Frankivsk Oblast
- Raion: Nadvirna Raion
- Hromada: Nadvirna urban hromada
- Founded: 1479

Population
  - Total: 1,895

Nazavyziv (Ukrainian: Назавизів) is a village located in Nadvirna Raion in Ivano-Frankivsk Oblast in western Ukraine. It belongs to Nadvirna urban hromada, one of the hromadas of Ukraine. The population of the 2001 census was 1,895 people. Nazavyziv covers an area of 62.46 km². Zip code is 78425.

== History ==
The first written mention of the village dates back to 1479. The tax register of 1515 in the village documents a mill and 4 fields (about 100 hectares) of arable land.
