= Vitreoretinopathy =

Vitreoretinopathy may refer to:

- Autosomal dominant neovascular inflammatory vitreoretinopathy (ADNIV), a rare inherited autoimmune uveitis, first identified in 1990
- Familial exudative vitreoretinopathy, a genetic eye disorder
- Proliferative vitreoretinopathy, a disease that develops as a complication to rhegmatogenous retinal detachment
