= Edward Rosenbaum =

American Physician and Author

Edward E Rosenbaum
- Born: May 14, 1915; Omaha, Nebraska
- Died: May 31, 2009 (aged 94); Portland, Oregon
- Education: M.D.
- Alma mater: Creighton University, University of Nebraska
- Occupations: Physician and author
- Known for: Author of The Doctor

Edward E Rosenbaum (May 14, 1915 – May 31, 2009), was an American physician and author. He is best known for the autobiographical chronicle of his experience with throat cancer, The Doctor, (initially published as A Taste of My Own Medicine), which was the basis of the movie The Doctor, starring William Hurt as a physician modeled on Dr. Rosenbaum. He was also the founder of the Division of Arthritis and Rheumatic Diseases at the Oregon Health & Science University, where a chair of medicine is named in his honor.

== Early life ==
Rosenbaum was born in Omaha, Nebraska to Bessie Mittleman Rosenbaum and Sam Rosenbaum. He graduated from Omaha Central High School.

== Training ==
Rosenbaum attended Creighton University and, in 1934, transferred to a combined bachelor and medical degree program at the University of Nebraska College of Medicine, where he earned an M.D. in 1938. He interned at Jewish Hospital of St. Louis (1938–39), did a residency in metabolic disease at Michael Reese Hospital in Chicago (1939–40), and began a fellowship in internal medicine at the Mayo Clinic, Rochester (1940–41). After army service in World War II, he returned to the Mayo Clinic (1946–48) where he trained in rheumatology under future Nobel laureate Phillip Hench.

== Military service ==
While in medical training, Rosenbaum joined the US Army Reserve. In 1941, he was called to active duty. He was assigned to a mobile surgical unit that was deployed in the invasions of Africa, Sicily, and Normandy. In late 1944, Dr. Rosenbaum, who had suffered from burns, malaria, and hepatitis, was transferred back to the United States and then hospitalized for six months. He had been promoted to major and awarded the Bronze Star. He finished his Army service as chief of medical services for the Women’s Army Corps.

== Medical practice and teaching ==
Rosenbaum moved to Portland, Oregon in January, 1948 where he joined Dr. Isadore Brill to practice internal medicine and rheumatology. Rosenbaum was soon joined in practice by his brother William M. Rosenbaum, M.D. and, a few years later, by John Flanery. M.D. Over the years, a number of other physicians joined Rosenbaum's practice, including his nephew, Robert A. Rosenbaum, M.D., and his son, Richard B. Rosenbaum, M.D.

Edward Rosenbaum was on the volunteer faculty of the University of Oregon Medical School (now Oregon Health & Science University) where he established the Division of Arthritis and Rheumatic Diseases in 1950. He headed the division for thirty years. In 1979 he wrote a rheumatology text, Rheumatology: New Directions in Therapy. Rosennbaum retired from the practice of medicine in 1986.

== DMSO ==
In 1963, Rosenbaum began to collaborate with Dr. Stanley Jacob in research on medical uses of dimethyl sulfoxide (DMSO). The drug showed promise in the treatment of many conditions and the popular press brought the researchers briefly into the public limelight, but safety concerns ultimately limited the drug’s use.

== The Doctor ==
In 1985, Rosenbaum was diagnosed with throat cancer. He kept a diary of experiences as a cancer patient, which Random House published as A Taste of My Own Medicine. The book became the basis of the 1991 movie The Doctor and was issued as a paperback under that name. With the publicity from the movie, the paperback became a best-seller. Rosenbaum appears in a brief scene in the movie, playing a doctor in a hospital corridor.

The success of the book and movie led Rosenbaum to embark on a second career as a writer and speaker. He advocated for more humane practices in medicine. He was a columnist for New Choices magazine briefly, served as a medical advisor to the 1995 movie Roommates, and a collection of his essays was used in an English language instruction text for Japanese medical students.

== Personal life ==
Rosenbaum married Davida Naftalin, daughter of Rose Naftalin, in 1942. They had four sons and six grandchildren. He suffered from Parkinson's disease in his final years and his illness was chronicled in a book written by his eldest son. His granddaughter is Dr. Lisa Rosenbaum, a cardiologist and host of the Not Otherwise Specified podcast for the New England Journal of Medicine. Rosenbaum died in Portland, Oregon, on May 31, 2009, six weeks after the birth of his first great-grandchild.

== Honors and legacy ==
In 1992, Rosenbaum was the commencement speaker at the College of Osteopathic Medicine of the Pacific, which for a time presented an annual Edward E. Rosenbaum Humanism in Medicine award. A professorship at the Oregon Health and Science University is named after Rosenbaum. His son, James T. Rosenbaum, was the first to hold the position and for over twenty years was the director of the division that his father founded at the university. The Edward E. Rosenbaum Hospice Life Award from Gifted Wishes is also named after him.
