= Marc Rosenbaum =

- Occupation: Engineer
- Known for: Energy-efficient architecture

Marc Rosenbaum, P.E., is an American engineer notable for his work on the design of energy-efficient sustainable architecture.

Rosenbaum studied mechanical engineering at the Massachusetts Institute of Technology where he earned BS and MS degrees. He has been involved in the design of a number of notable sustainable energy projects.

Rosenbaum built his first superinsulated house in Meriden, New Hampshire in 1978. The design process of the Meriden house was, driven by the goal of heating the house with one cord of wood per year. This approach to designing a sustainable house remains uncommon yet effective.

In 1979, Rosenbaum cofounded Energysmiths with Daniel Ingold.

As of 2014, he was director of engineering at South Mountain Company on Martha's Vineyard in Massachusetts, and he also taught a course on designing net-zero energy buildings.
