= Rose Naftalin =

Chef

Rose G. Naftalin
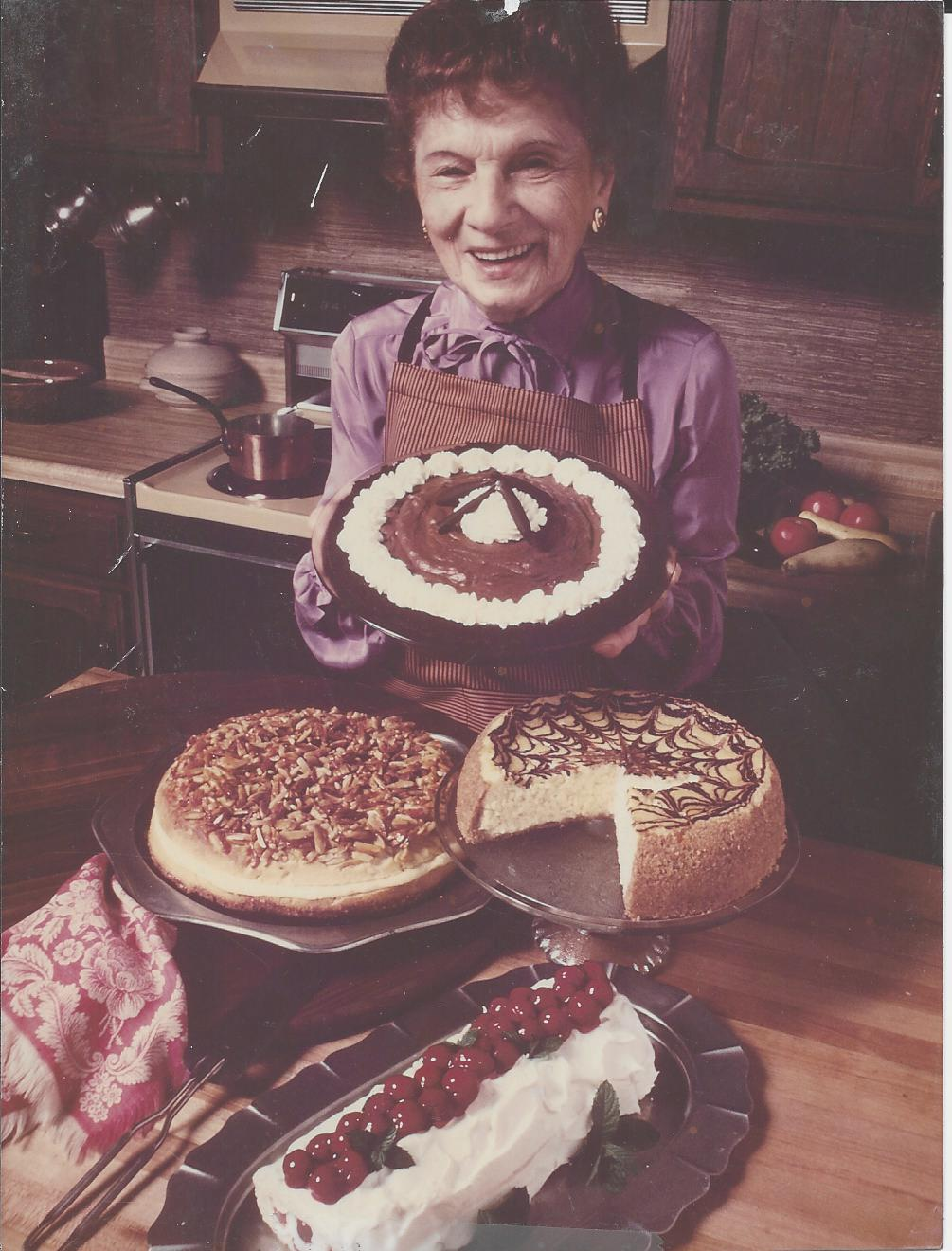
- Grandma Rose serves brunch 1992
- Born: March 18, 1896 or 1897; Białystok, Russian Empire (modern-day Poland)
- Died: April 16, 1998 (aged 101 or 102); Portland, Oregon, U.S.
- Occupations: restaurateur and cookbook author
- Known for: Author of "Grandma Rose's Book of Sinfully Delicious Cakes, Cookies, Pies, Cheese Cakes, Cake Rolls & Pastries" and "Grandma Rose's Book of Sinfully Delicious Snacks, Nibbles, Noshes & Other Delights"

Rose Naftalin (born Riwke Garbowitz; March 18, 1896 or 1897 – April 16, 1998) was an American chef, restaurateur, and cookbook author. She founded and ran popular restaurants in Toledo, Ohio, and Portland, Oregon. These were especially known for their baked goods, including cinnamon rolls, cheesecakes, and other pastries. After retiring from the restaurant business, she wrote two cookbooks and gained a national following as "Grandma Rose."

Short and pencil-thin, she rarely ate her own baking. To study the work of other bakers, she would examine, feel, and smell a piece of pastry and could then make her own version of it without tasting. She believed that outcomes in baking depend on the quality of ingredients, and she urged her cookbook readers to use the finest and freshest.

== Early life ==
She was born Riwke Garbowitz on March 18, 1896 or 1897, to Beril Garbowitz and Sarah (Sore) Raisen Garbowitz. The family, including her younger siblings Ben and Dorothy, emigrated from Bialystock and arrived at Ellis Island in 1904. They settled in Chicago and used the last name Garbow.

Beril, an ornamental stone carver, died in a construction accident about 1907 or 1908. Sarah had a fourth child, Carl, a few months later, and overwhelmed, placed all four children in a Jewish orphanage.

Rose left the orphanage at age fifteen or sixteen to work as a secretary and about age nineteen married Mandel Naftalin. They had two children, Davida, born in 1918, and Bernard (Bud) born in 1923.

== Restaurant career ==
Rose could not cook when she got married and learned how by using books, classes and correspondence schools. At a Chicago cooking school, she met Vienna-born Nanny Wolfe, who taught her Viennese-style baking.

The family moved to Toledo, Ohio. Rose baked avidly at home. She submitted a bundt kuchen to a local fair and won first prize, a dining room table and chairs. The next year her sixteen-layer chocolate cake won first place in a contest for bakers in Ohio and Michigan.

In 1927 Rose and Mandel opened a small delicatessen near their apartment. The delicatessen had only a one-burner stove, so Rose would cook in the apartment. "We worked in shifts until one in the morning when I would go home, set the yeast dough, and while it was rising, make cupcakes, ice a sheet cake, bake a batch of cookies, and roll the schnecken — cinnamon rolls — to let them rise again. I would stick another batch of cookies in the oven, and by that time the yeast dough would be ready to bake."

They moved their delicatessen to a larger space nearby at 2204 Ashland Avenue. Mandel died in the 1930s, and Rose managed and baked at Rose's Food Shoppe alone until 1955. The restaurant became a favorite Toledo meeting place. The comedian Joe E. Brown, who grew up in Toledo, came in often, and in his honor, Rose created the Joe E. Brown cookie, a delicate cigar-shaped shell made of butter, brown sugar, pecans, and flour rolled just long enough that Brown could put one sideways into his wide mouth.

In 1955 Rose closed her Toledo restaurant and moved to Portland, Oregon, where both her children lived. She did not enjoy retirement and in 1956 opened Rose's Restaurant and Delicatessen at 315 NW 23rd Street in Portland, next door to the office of her son-in-law Dr. Edward Rosenbaum; she resumed her old work schedule, cooking and baking 18 or more hours a day with a rare day off for holidays. She sold Rose's in 1969. Successors continued Rose's at the same location until January, 1994.

== Cookbooks and later life ==
She retired to her small apartment where she cooked continually, adapting her restaurant size recipes to home versions. With the help of her daughter-in-law Bonnie Naftalin, she wrote out her recipes for the first time. In 1975 Random House published her first cookbook, Grandma Rose's Book of Sinfully Delicious Cakes, Cookies, Pies, Cheese Cakes, Cake Rolls & Pastries, which sold about 100,000 copies. She traveled widely with her daughter Davida for book signing parties. They always brought along bountiful samples of her pastries, displayed beside the book. Many a taste was followed by the sale of an autographed copy.

In 1978, Random House published her second cookbook Grandma Rose's Book of Sinfully Delicious Snacks, Nibbles, Noshes & Other Delights. In his column fellow Portlander James Beard wrote: "For anyone interested in cooking, the book is a wonderful investment." The book placed behind Julia Child and Company by Julia Child for the RT French Best Cookbook Award of 1978.

Rose continued cooking, sharing food with family and friends until her late 90s. It took a broken hip to stop her. She died in 1998. Her obituary was accompanied by many testimonials to her passion for food, her energy, and her generosity.
