= Meyer Rosenbaum (I) =

Grand Rebbe Meyer Rosenbaum (1852–1908), Kretchnifer Rebbe, was the son of Rabbi Mordechai of Nadvorna (1824–1894) who was originally known as Rabbi Mordechai Leifer but is noted to have changed his last name to Rosenbaum.

Rosenbaum's scholarly work is called "Razah DeUvdah."

Rebbe Meyer Rosenbaum was the only person whom his father, the Nadvorna Rebbe, authorized to issue kameyos (written amulets) to chassidim, followers. Rosenbaum had two (2) sons: Grand Rabbi Eliezer Zev Rosenbaum Kretchnifer Rebbe, (who was killed in 1944 in the Holocaust), and Rabbi Issamar of Nadvorna.

Rosenbaum was the first rebbe of the Kretshnif dynasty, a Hasidic Jewish dynasty that is descended from the Nadvorna dynasty. It is named for the town of Kretshnif, Romania, where Grand Rabbi Meir Rosenbaum resided. His sons and successors included Rabbi Eliezer Zev in Kretshnif and Sighit, and Rebbe Issamar of Nadvorna (also known as Rebbe Meyer Rosenbaum II) in Chernowitz. Today, descendants of the Kretshnif dynasty can be found across the globe, particularly in Israel, New York City, England, and Canada.

Rosenbaum is buried in Kretchnif.
