= Simon Rosenbaum (statistician) =

British academic

Simon Rosenbaum B.Sc. (born 1877) was a British academic active in the early twentieth century, whose major field of study was statistics. He is perhaps best known today for an editing a collection of essays entitled Against Home Rule: The Case for Union, which was first published in 1912 at the height of the crisis over Irish Home Rule. Contributors to this work included Arthur Balfour, Austen Chamberlain, and Leo Amery.

== Partial bibliography ==
=== Books ===
- Against Home Rule: The Case for Union. Kennikat Press, 1912.

=== Journal articles ===
- "A Contribution to the Study of the Vital and Other Statistics of the Jews in the United Kingdom" in Journal of the Royal Statistical Society, Vol. 68, No. 3. (September, 1905), pp. 526–562.
- "Food Taxation in the United Kingdom, France, Germany, and the United States" in Journal of the Royal Statistical Society, Vol. 71, No. 2. (June, 1908), pp. 319–365.
- "The General Election of January, 1910, and the Bearing of the Results on Some Problems of Representation" in Journal of the Royal Statistical Society, Vol. 73, No. 5. (May, 1910), pp. 473–528.
- "The Trade of the British Empire" in Journal of the Royal Statistical Society, Vol. 76, No. 8. (July, 1913), pp. 739–774.
- "The Effects of the War on the Overseas Trade of the United Kingdom" in Journal of the Royal Statistical Society, Vol. 78, No. 4. (July, 1915), pp. 501–554.
