= Mordechai Leifer =

Ukrainian rabbi (1824–1894)

Mordechai Leifer (or Läufer) (1824–1894) was a rabbi in Nadvirna, Ukraine.

== Biography ==
Leifer was the son of Rabbi Yesochor Bertche Leifer (d. 1848), author of Sisrei Torah, and a great-great-grandson of Rabbi Meir "The Great" of Premishlan. He served as a Hasidic Rebbe of Nadvirna (Nadwórna). He was raised by his great uncle, Rebbe Meir'l of Premishlan. Hasidim from all over Hungary and Romania would come to receive his blessings. An extraordinarily large number of his descendants became Hasidic rebbes, including many around the world today. His teachings are collected in Gedulas Mordechai, Tiferes Mordechai, Aspaklarya Hameira, Maamar Mordechai and Oros Mordechai.

Leifer is buried in Bushtyno, Ukraine.

His wife, Chaya (d. 1891), was the daughter of Rabbi Shmuel Shmelka Taubes, Chief Rabbi of Yas, son of Rabbi Aaron Moses Taubes, author of the To'afos R-eim.

They were survived by six sons and one daughter:

- Rebbe Yitzchock Leifer of Stanislav
- Rebbe Yisaschar Bertzi Leifer of Satmar
- Rebbe Meir Rosenbaum of Kretchnif
- Rebbe Aharon Moshe Leifer of Żołynia-Łańcut
- Rebbe Yisroel Yaakov Leifer of Chust
- Rebbe Yoseph Leifer of Niredhaz
- Rebbitzen Leah Bina Igra of Zolynia (died childless)

Today, there are close to 100 Grand Rebbes who claim descent from Rebbe Mordechai of Nadvorna.

== See also ==
- Nadvorna (Hasidic dynasty)
