= Nadvorna (Hasidic dynasty) =

Ukrainian Hasidic dynasty

Nadvorna Hasidic Dynasty
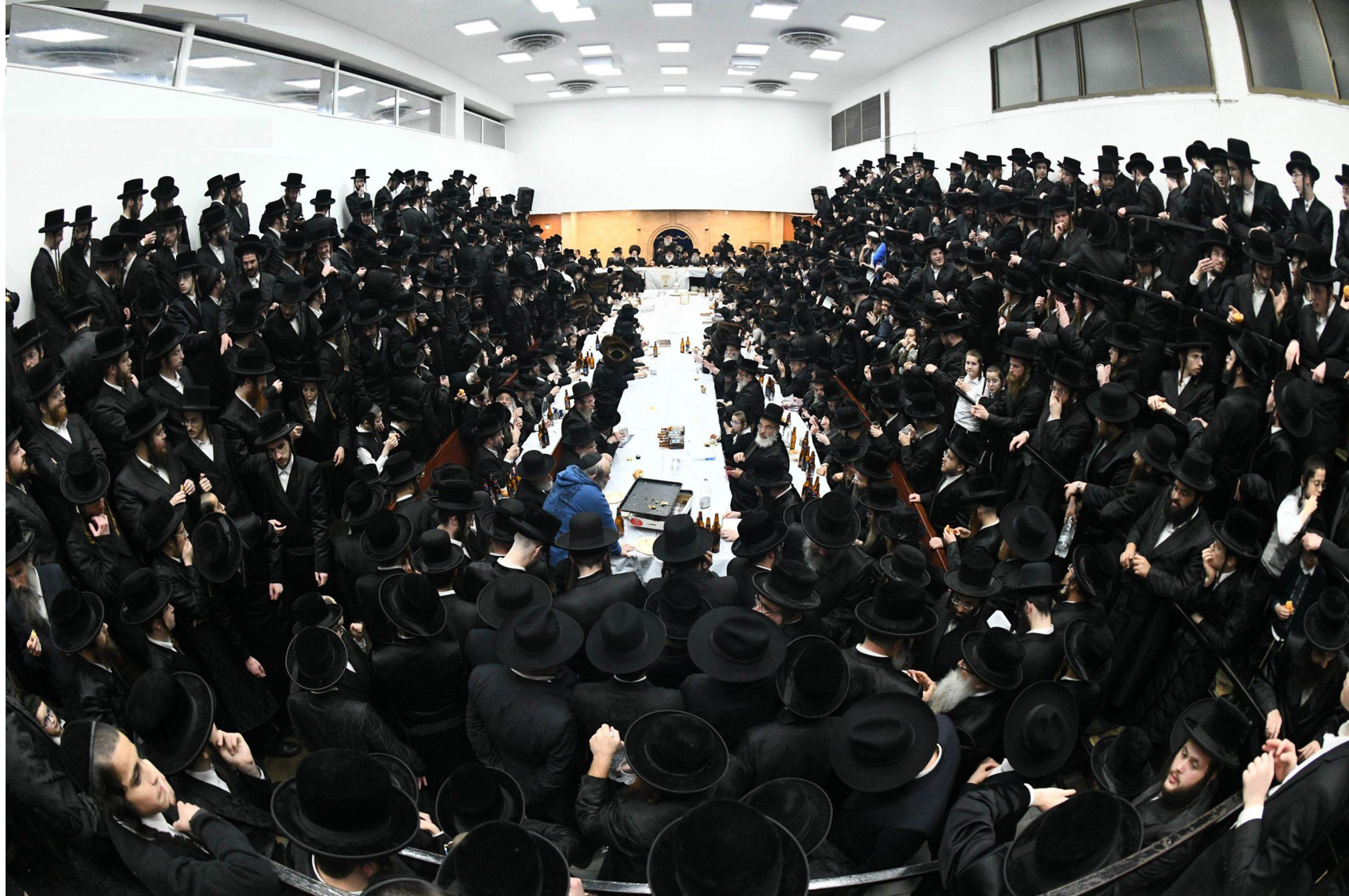
- Tish in Nadvorna

Total population
- Over 10,000 families (2022)

Founder
- Grand Rabbi Mordechai Leifer

Regions with significant populations
- Israel, Ukraine, United States, Europe

Religions
- Hasidic Judaism

Languages
- Hebrew, Yiddish
- Current headquarters in Bnei Brak, Israel

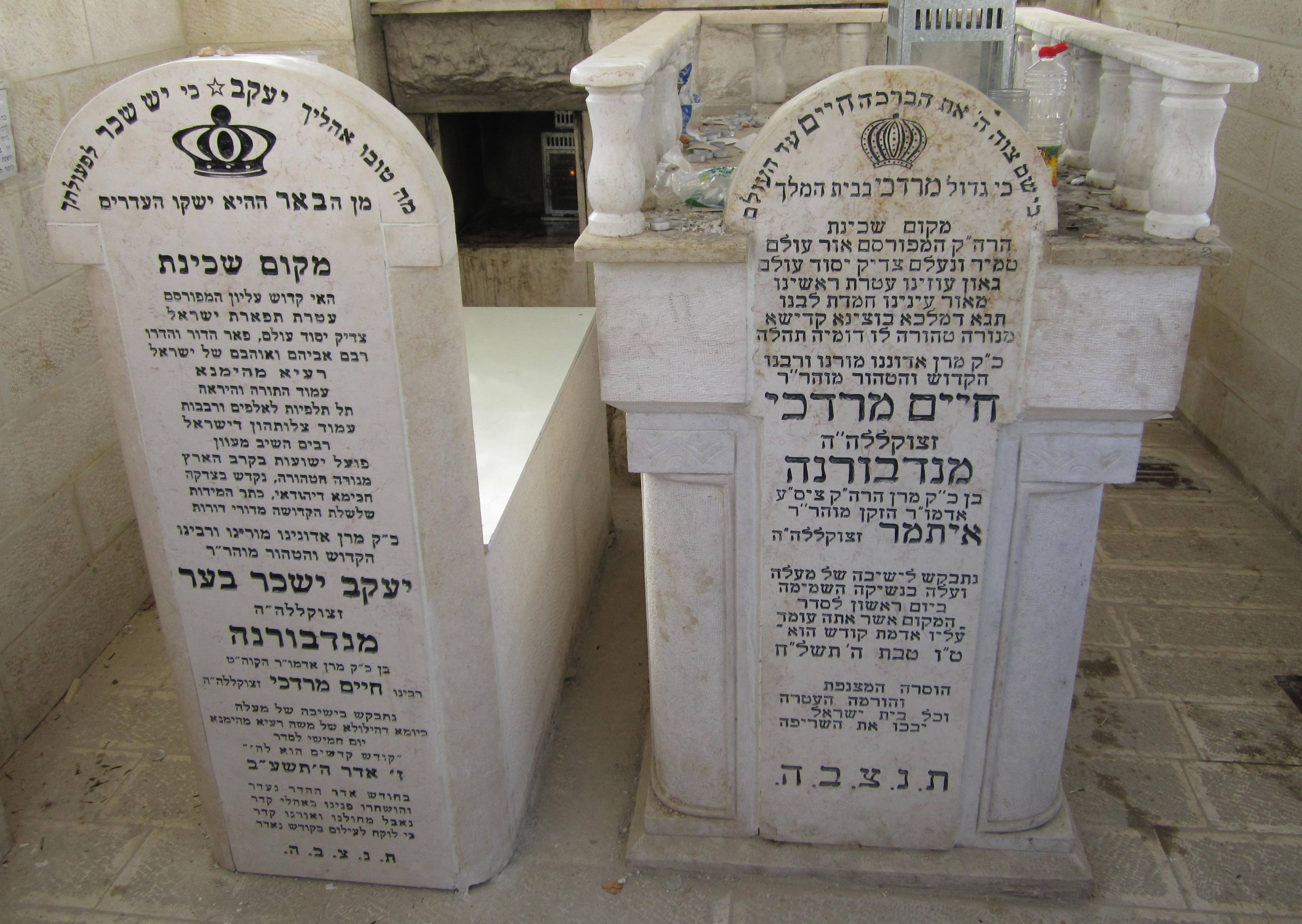
Graves of Nadvorna rebbes on the Mount of Olives

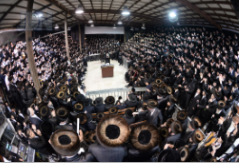
Nadvorna Hasidim at the inauguration of a Torah scroll

Nadvorna is a Hasidic rabbinical dynasty deriving its name from the town of Nadvorna, (Nadvirna), today in Ukraine.

The most famous rebbe of the dynasty was Mordechai Leifer of Nadvorna (the son of Rabbi Yissachar Dov Ber (Bertche) Leifer of Nadvorna), whose writings form the corpus of the group's Hasidic thought. He was raised by his great-uncle, Rebbe Meir II of Premishlan.

Yissachar Dov Ber (Bertche) Leifer of Nadvorna was a son of Rabbi Yitzchak of Kalish. Since many of the rebbes of the Nadvorna Dynasty (as in other rabbinic dynasties) married relatives, many of the rebbes in this list are sons-in-law of other rebbes on the list.

There are Nadvorna congregations in Israel, Brooklyn, London, and Bloomingburg, among others.

The mode of dress of Nadvorna rebbes is unique in that they typically wear a white gartel over a colorful bekishe, and a white crocheted Jerusalem-style kippah under their shtreimel.

Rebbes are known as "Admorim" (Hebrew אדמו"ר, which is the acronym for "אדוננו מורינו ורבינו", "Adoneinu Moreinu V'Rabeinu", "Our master, our teacher, and our rabbi").

== Outline of the History of the Nadvorna Dynasty ==
Grand Rabbi Israel Baal Shem Tov, founder of Hasidism

- Grand Rabbi Meir the Great of Premishlan (1703–1773), disciple of the Baal Shem Tov
  - Grand Rabbi Uren Arye Leib of Premishlan (died 1813) disciple of Rabbi Yechiel Michl of Zlotshov; son of Rabbi Meir the Great
    See also Premishlan (Hasidic dynasty)
    - Grand Rabbi Yitzchak of Kalish, son of Rabbi Uren Arye Leib of Premishlan
      - Grand Rabbi Yissachar Dov Ber (Bertche) Leifer of Nadvorna (died 1848), author of Sisrei Torah, son of Rabbi Yitzchak of Kalish; disciple of Rabbi Yitzchak of Radvill; son-in-law of Rabbi Avrohom Leib Bloch of Nadvorna
        - Grand Rabbi Aaron Leib Leifer of Nadvorna (1819–1897), was known as a great miracle worker and kabbalist, author of Yad Aharon, son of Rabbi Bertche
          - Grand Rabbi Moshe Leifer of Nadvorna, son of Rabbi Aaron Leib
          - Grand Rabbi Yitzchak Leifer of Hartz-Raman, son of Rabbi Aaron Leib
        - Grand Rabbi Mordechai Leifer of Nadvorna (1824-1894), author of Mamar Mordechai, son of Rabbi Bertche
    - Grand Rabbi Meir the Second of Premishlan (1783–1850), son of Rabbi Uren Arye Leib
  - Grand Rabbi David of Kalish, son of Rabbi Meir the Great

=== Descendants of Rabbi Mordechai of Nadvorna ===
- Grand Rabbi Yitzchak Leifer of Stanislaw, son of Rabbi Mordechai of Nadvorna
  - Grand Rabbi Chaim Leifer of Stanislaw (murdered together with his entire family in the Holocaust) son of Rabbi Yitzchak Leifer of Stanislaw, and son law of Rabbi Meir Rosenbaum of Nadvorna-Kretshnif
    - Grand Rabbi Yisachar Berel Leifer of Stanislaw, son of Rabbi Chaim Leifer of Stanislaw, and son in law of Rabbi Yissachar Dov Ber (Bertche) Leifer of Nadvorna-Satmar
- Grand Rabbi Yissachar Dov Ber (Bertche) Leifer of Nadvorna-Satmar (died 1906), Author of Likkutei Yissachar, son of Rabbi Mordechai of Nadvorna
  - Grand Rabbi Meir Leifer of Cleveland (died 1941), son of Rabbi Yissachar Dov Ber (Bertche) of Nadvorna-Satmar, Author of Oros Hameirim, son in law of Rabbi Alter Zev Horowitz of Stryzov
  - Grand Rabbi Isamar Leifer of Bushtina (d. 1944), son of Rabbi Yissachar Dov Ber (Bertche) of Nadvorna-Satmar, son in law of Rabbi Yisroel Chaim Freedman of Rachov
    - Grand Rabbi Mordechai Leifer of Bushtina, son of Rabbi Isamar of Bushtina
      - Grand Rabbi Chaim Baruch Leifer of Bushtina in Canada, son of Rabbi Mordechai Leifer of Bushtina
      - Grand Rabbi Isamar Leifer of Bushtina, son of Rabbi Mordechai Leifer of Bushtina
      - Grand Rabbi Yissachar Ber Leifer of Bushtina Petah Tikva, son of Rebbe Mordechai Leifer of Bushtina
  - Grand Rabbi David Leifer of Bania (d. 1944), author of Ohev Chesed, son of Rabbi Yissachar Dov Ber (Bertche) of Nadvorna-Satmar
    - Grand Rabbi Aaron Yechiel Leifer of Nadvorna-Safed, son of Rabbi David of Bania
      - Grand Rabbi Mordechai Yitzchok Leifer of Kalish in the neighborhood Har Nof in Jerusalem, son of Rabbi Aaron Yechiel Leifer of Nadvorna-Safed, son in law of Rabbi David Moshe Rosenbaum of Kretshnif
      - Grand Rabbi Yissachar Ber Pinchas Leifer of Nadvorna-Safed, son of Rabbi Aaron Yechiel
      - Grand Rabbi Chaim Alter David of Nadvorna-Haifa, son of Rabbi Aaron Yechiel
      - Grand Rabbi Moshe Meir Leifer of Yerushalayem, son of Rabbi Aaron Yechiel Leifer of Nadvorna-Safed
    - Grand Rabbi Mordechai Leifer of Bania, son of Rabbi David Leifer of Bania
      - Grand Rabbi Dovid Leifer of Bania in Monroe, son of Rabbi Mordechai Leifer of Bania
      - Grand Rabbi Meir Menasha Leifer of Bania-Monsey, son of Rabbi Mordechai Leifer of Bania
    - Grand Rabbi Yissachar Ber Leifer of Nadvorna-Hermanshtat in Boro Park, son of Rabbi David Leifer of Bania
      - Grand Rabbi Mordechai Leifer of Nadvorna-Hermanshtat in Boro Park, son of Rabbi Yissachar Ber Leifer of Hermanshtat
      - Grand Rabbi Meir Leifer of Lishensk, son of Rabbi Yissachar Ber Leifer of Hermanshtat
  - Grand Rabbi Yosef Leifer of Pittsburg (1891–1966), author of Tzidkas Yosef, son of Rabbi Yissachar Dov Ber (Bertche) of Nadvorna-Satmar
    - Grand Rabbi Avraham Abba Leifer (1916-1990) Pittsburger Rebbe of Newark and later Ashdod, author of Emunas Avraham, son of Rabbi Yosef, and son-in-law of Rabbi Isamar of Nadvorna
      - Grand Rabbi Mordechai Yissachar Ber Leifer of Pittsburg author of Pisgumei Oraysa, present Pittsburger Rebbe, son of Rabbi Avraham Abba
  - Grand Rabbi Aharon Moshe Leifer of Grusvardein (d. 1944), author of Vayakhel Moshe, son of Rabbi Yissachar Dov Ber (Bertche) of Nadvorna-Satmar
    - Grand Rabbi Yoseph Leifer of Verdan-Flatbush author of Divrei Torah, son of Rabbi Aharon Moshe Leifer of Grusvardein, son in law of Rabbi Isaac Rosenbaum of Zutshka
      - Grand Rabbi Shea Katz of Magrov Flatbush, son-in-law of Rabbi Yosef of Verdan
  - Grand Rabbi Shalom Leifer of Brighton Beach, son of Rabbi Yissachar Dov Ber (Bertche) of Nadvorna-Satmar
    - Grand Rabbi Shlomo Leifer of Nadvorna in Boro Park, son of Rabbi Shalom of Brighton Beach
      - Rabbi Berel Leifer, Nadvorna Rav of Lakewood, son of Rabbi Shlomo Leifer of Nadvorna
      - Rabbi Menashe Leifer, Nadvorna Rav of Williamsburg, son of Rabbi Shlomo Leifer of Nadvorna, son in law of Rabbi Yoseph Rosenbaum of Kalish
      - Grand Rabbi Avrohm Abish Shmidman of Krula-Flatbush, son of Rabbi Yitzchok Eizik Leifer, son of Rabbi Shalom Leifer of Brighton Beach
- Grand Rabbi Meyer Rosenbaum of Nadvorna-Kretshnif (1852 - June 29 1908) son of Rabbi Mordechai Leifer (changed last name to Rosenbaum), son-in-law of Rabbi Yechiel Michel Tirer of Dorohoi
  - Descendants of Grand Rabbi Meir Rosenbaum
- Grand Rabbi Aaron Moshe Leifer of Zalon-Lantzut, son of Rabbi Mordechai of Nadvorna, son in law of Rabbi Meir Reich of Reisha
  - Grand Rabbi Avraham Mendel Leifer of Kolymaya (fondly known as the Bucher Rebbe) (d. 1917), son of Rabbi Aaron Moshe Leifer of Zalon-Lantzut
- Grand Rabbi Yisroel Yaakov Leifer of Chust (b. 1857, d. 1929), youngest son and successor of Rabbi Mordechai of Nadvorna, son in law of Rabbi Reuven Frankel of Melitz
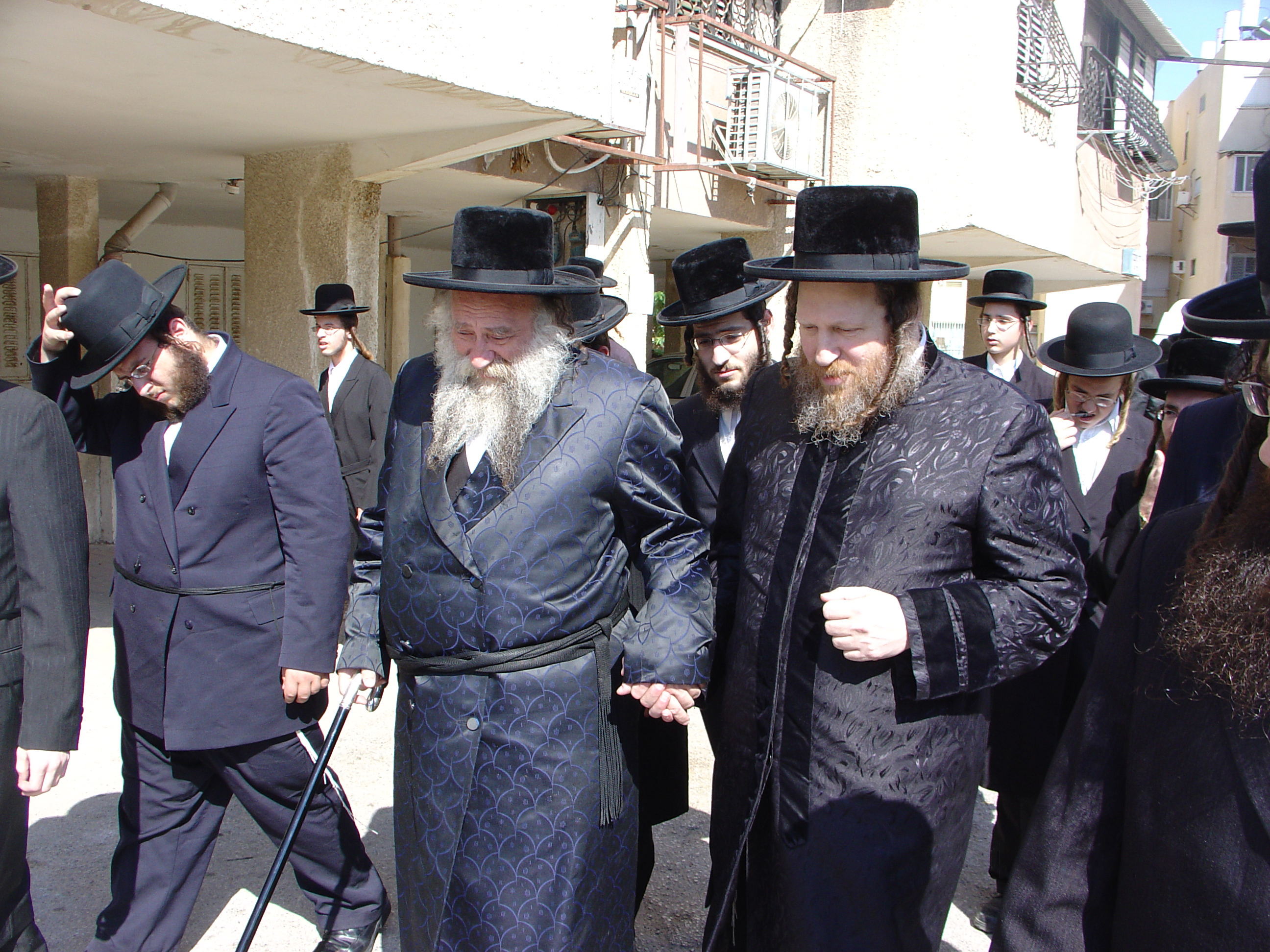
  Grand Rabbis Shmuel Shmelke Leifer of Chust (USA) and Mordechai Yissachar Ber Leifer of Pittsburgh (Ashdod)
  - Grand Rabbi Shmuel Shmelke Leifer of Chust (d. 1934), son of Rabbi Yisroel Yaakov
    - Grand Rabbi Aharon Moshe Leifer of Chust (b. 1905, d. 1991), son of Rabbi Shmuel Shmelke
      - Grand Rabbi Shmuel Shmelke Leifer of Chust, son of Rabbi Aharon Moshe of Chust (b. 1944, d. 2023)
      - Grand Rabbi Baruch Pinchos Leifer of Chust-Israel, son of Rabbi Aharon Moshe of Chust
      - Grand Rabbi Yisroel Yaakov Leifer of Chust, son of Rabbi Aharon Moshe of Chust, Son in law of Rabbi Yosef of Verdan
  - Grand Rabbi Dovid Leifer of Chust, son of Rabbi Yisroel Yaakov, and son in law of Rabbi Pinchas of Kechneye
  - Grand Rabbi Yisachar Ber Leifer of Chust, son of Rabbi Yisroel Yaakov Leifer of Chust, son in law of his brother Rabbi Shmuel Shmelke Leifer of Chust
  - Grand Rabbi Reuven Leifer of Grosvardein, son of Rabbi Yisroel Yaakov Leifer of Chust
  - Grand Rabbi Dovid Leifer of Grosvardein, son of Rabbi Yisroel Yaakov Leifer of Chust, son in law of Rabbi Pinchas Shapiro of Kechneya
  - Rabbi Sholom Ginzberg, Rabbi of Strozhnitz, son in law of Rabbi Yisroel Yaakov of Chust
    - Rabbi Mordechai Ginzberg, son of Rabbi Sholom Ginzberg, Rabbi of Strozhnitz, author of Sefer Tiferes Mordechai.
    - Rabbi Yitzchok Pinchas Ginsberg (1898–1994), son of Rabbi Sholom Ginzberg, Rabbi of Strozhnitz - founder of the Kehillas Yitzchok synagogue and beit midrash in Los Angeles.
      - Rabbi Sholom Ginsberg, current rebbe of Kehillas Yitzchok in Los Angeles.
  - Grand Rabbi Chaim Shlomie Sega"l Lowy of Chust-Tosh, son-in-law of Rabbi Yisroel Yaakov
      - Grand Rabbi Meshulam Feish Ginsburg of Chust, grandson of Rabbi Chaim Shlomie Sega"l Lowy of Chust-Tosh
      - Grand Rabbi Yehuda Halevi Tyrnauer of congregation Shomrei Shabbos, Boro Park, grandson of Rabbi of Chust
- Grand Rabbi Yoseph Leifer of Nirdhas, son of Rabbi Mordechai of Nadvorna, son in law of Rabbi Aryeh Leib Rubin of Ropshitz
  - Grand Rabbi Moshe Menachem of Debrecen, son of Rabbi Yoseph Leifer of Nirdhas
  - Grand Rabbi Yaakov Leifer of Nadvorna-Debrecen, son of Rabbi Yoseph Leifer of Nirdhas, son in law of Rabbi Aharon Moshe Zolynia-Lantzut
    - Grand Rabbi Yitzchak of Lapash, author of Tferes Maraham, and of Sefer Hadoros Hachadash son of Rabbi Yaakov Leifer of Nadvorna Debrecen
    - Grand Rabbi Yisachar Ber Leifer of Zolynia,(1920–2008) son Rabbi Yaakov Leifer of Debrecen, and son in law of Rabbi Issamar of Bushtina
      - Grand Rabbi Yaakov Leifer of Zolynia son of Rabbi Yisachar Ber Leifer of Zolynia, son in law of Rabbi Yozeph of Liska
      - Grand Rabbi Chaim Mordechai Aharon Moshe of Nadvorna-England son of Rabbi Yisachar Ber Leifer of Zolynia
  - Grand Rabbi Yitzchak Leifer of Bronx, son of Rabbi Yoseph Leifer of Nirdhas, son in law of Rabbi Yissachar Dov Ber (Bertche) of Nadvorna-Satmar
- Grand Rabbi Avraham Yoseph Igra of Zolynia author of Toldos Avraham Yoseph, son in law of Rabbi Mordechai of Nadvorna

=== Reb Yosef of Borsha ===
- Grand Rabbi Yoseph Leifer of Borsha, he knew the entire Zohar by heart, son of Rabbi Bertche, son-in-law of Rabbi Mordechai Kahane of Borsha
  - Grand Rabbi Yissachar Dov Ber (Bertche) Leifer of Ungvar, son of Rabbi Yoseph
  - Grand Rabbi Yechiel Leifer of Mihalowitz, son of Rabbi Yoseph
    - Grand Rabbi Levi Yitzchak Leifer of Nadvorna-Haifa (died 1961), son of Rabbi Yechiel
    - Grand Rabbi Aaron Aryeh Leifer of Nadvorna-Temashvar (died 1963), son of Rabbi Yechiel
      - Grand Rabbi Leifer of Nadvorna-Temashvar, son of Rabbi Aaron Aryeh
      - Grand Rabbi Yoseph Leifer of Nadvorna-Petah Tikva (1921–2002) son of Rabbi Aaron Aryeh
        - Grand Rabbi Yitzchok Leifer, oldest son of Rabbi Yoseph of Petah Tikva
        - Grand Rabbi Chaim Leifer, son of Rabbi Yoseph of Petah Tikva
        - Grand Rabbi Binyamin Leifer, son of Rabbi Yoseph of Petah Tikva
        - Grand Rabbi Yisachar Ber Leifer, son of Rabbi Yoseph of Petah Tikva
        - Grand Rabbi Meir Leifer, son of Rabbi Yoseph of Petah Tikva
        - Grand Rabbi Aaron Aryeh Leifer, son of Rabbi Yoseph of Petah Tikva

== Rabbi Meir of Kretshnif-Nadvorna ==
Descendants of Rabbi Meir

- Grand Rabbi Meir Rosenbaum of Nadvorna-Kretshnif (1852 - June 29 1908) son of Rabbi Mordechai Leifer (changed last name to Rosenbaum), son-in-law of Rabbi Yechiel Michel Tirer of Dorohoi
  - Grand Rabbi Shlomo Isaacson, Romaner Rebbe, son-in-law of Rabbi Meir of Kretshnif
    - Grand Rabbi Yisachar Ber Isaacson of Polyina, son of Rabbi Shlomo Isaacson the Romaner Rebbe, and son-in-law of Rabbi Yisroel Chaim Friedman of Rachov,
      - Grand Rabbi Yechiel Yehuda Isaacson Of Achuza, son of Rabbi Yisachar Ber Isaacson of Polyina, son-in-law of Rabbi Chaim Tzvi Teitelbaum of Sighet,
    - Grand Rabbi Yisroel (Isaacson) Leifer of Nirdhas, son of Rabbi Shlomo Isaacson, Romaner Rebbe, son-in-law of Rabbi Yoseph Leifer of Nirdhas,
    - Grand Rabbi Meir Isaacson, Romaner Rebbe of Philadelphia and later Staten Island, son of Rabbi Shlomo, and son-in-law of Rabbi Issamar of Nadvorna
      - Grand Rabbi Chaim Shulem Isaacson, son of Rabbi Meir of Roman, of Philadelphia
        - Grand Rabbi Shloime Isaacson of Philadelphia, son of Rabbi Chaim Shulem
      - Grand Rabbi Shlomo Isaacson of Passaic, New Jersey, son of Rabbi Meir Of Roman
      - Grand Rabbi Berel Isaacson of Staten Island, son of Rabbi Meir Isaacson of Roman
  - Grand Rabbi Yaakov Yisachar Ber Rosenbaum of Slotvina-Sighet, son of Rabbi Meir Rosenbaum of Nadvorna-Kretshnif and son-in-law of Rabbi Aaron Moshe Leifer of Zalon-Lantzut
    - Grand Rabbi Chaim Mordechai of Mishkoltz, son of Rabbi Yaakov Yisachar Ber Rosenbaum of Slotvina-Sighet
    - Grand Rabbi Meir of Reisha, son of Rabbi Yaakov Yisachar Ber Rosenbaum of Slotvina-Sighet
    - Grand Rabbi Yitzchak of Sighet, author of Minchas Yitzchak, and Bishilei Hapri, son of Rabbi Yaakov Yisachar Ber Rosenbaum of Slotvina Sighet, son-in-law of Rabbi Yaakov Leifer of Nadvorna-Debrecen
  - Grand Rabbi Issamar Rosenbaum of Nadvorna, known as "Ha’admor Hazaken MiNadvorna" (1886–1973), son of Rabbi Meir of Kretshnif, son-in-law of Grand Rabbi Isaiah Rubin of Kolbasov
    - Grand Rabbi Chaim Mordechai Rosenbaum of Nadvorna-Bnei Brak (1903–1976), son of Rabbi Issamar of Chernovitz-Nadvorna, son-in-law of Rabbi Elazar Zev of Kretshnif
      - Grand Rabbi Yaakov Yisachar Ber Rosenbaum of Nadvorna-Bnei Brak (died Thursday, March 1, 2012 at Beilinson Hospital), son of Rabbi Chaim Mordechai. On May 22, 2015 a 65-year-old woman gave birth to her first child. It has been reported that Rabbi Yaakov Yisachar Ber Rosenbaum prior to his death blessed the couple with a child.
    - Grand Rabbi Yesochor Ber Rosenbaum (1905-1981), Strozhnitzer Rebbe in Boro Park, author of Divrei Yissachar, son of Rabbi Issamar Rosenbaum of Nadvorna, son-in-law of Rabbi Yissachar Dov Ber (Bertche) Leifer of Nadvorna-Satmar
      - Grand Rabbi Usher Mordechai Rosenbaum of Cleveland-Strozhnitz (died 1991) author of Sifsei Reim, son of Rabbi Yesochor Ber, and son-in-law of Rabbi Meir Leifer of Cleveland
        - Grand Rabbi Meir Yoseph Rosenbaum of Strozhnitz, son of Rabbi Usher Mordechai Rosenbaum of Cleveland-Stroznitz
          Grand Rabbi Yehoshua Heshel Rosenbaum of Cleveland-New York Rebbe
        - Grand Rabbi Yehoshua Heschel Rosenbaum of Cleveland present Clevelander Rebbe of Williamsburg, Brooklyn, son of Rabbi Usher Mordechai Rosenbaum of Cleveland-Stroznitz
        - Rabbi Yitzchak Isaac Rosenbaum of Strozhnitz in Stamford Hill, London, son of Rabbi Usher Mordechai
        - Grand Rabbi Alter Zev Rosenbaum of Nadvorna-Williamsburg, son of Rabbi Usher Mordechai Rosenbaum of Cleveland-Stroznitz
      - Grand Rabbi Meir Rosenbaum of Mosholu, son of Rabbi Yisachar Ber of Stroznitz
        - Grand Rabbi Duvid Rosenbaum of Kolbosov, from Williamsburg, Brooklyn, son of Rabbi Meir of Mosholu
        - Grand Rabbi Usher Mordechai Rosenbaum of Mosholu, present Mosholu Rebbe of Boro Park, son of Rabbi Meir.
      - Grand Rabbi Yitzchak Rosenbaum of Cleveland-Raanana, (1932-2020) Clevelander Rebbe of Raanana, son of Rabbi Yisachar Ber of Strozhnitz
      - Grand Rabbi Yosef Rosenbaum of Kalish, Kalisher Rebbe of Flatbush, Brooklyn, son of Rabbi Yisachar Ber of Stroznitz (died 2019)
        - Grand Rabbi Yechiel Mechel Rosenbaum of Kalish, (Kalisher Rebbe) (Kalish Rebbe), Kalish is a Hasidic dynasty from Europe and is now the rabbi of a hasidic dynasty and shul named Ginzai Yosef Kalish located at 1305 Ave R Brooklyn ny 11229. He also runs Yeshiva Tiferes Mordechai Kalish on the name of his grandfather Grand Rabbi Mordechai Leifer of Nadvorna.he is a son of Rabbi Yosef Rosenbaum.
    - Grand Rabbi Yitzchok Isaac Rosenbaum (January 18, 1908 - July 20, 2000) of Zutshka (near Chernivtsi) and later Bnei Brak, son of Rabbi Issamar of Nadvorna and son-in-law of Rabbi Noson Dovid Hollander (d. 1838), Amasna Rav
      - Grand Rabbi Nathan David Rosenbaum of Zutshka, previous Zutshker Rebbe, son of Rabbi Yitzchok
      - Grand Rabbi Meir Rosenbaum of Caracas, son of Rabbi Isaac of Zutshka
        - Grand Rabbi Yaakov Rosenbaum, son of Rabbi Meir. Zutshka-Caracas Rebbe and Resident shochet in Kiryas Tosh
          - Grand Rabbi Zeide Yisrael Chaim Yoel Rosenbaum, son of Rabbi Yaakov. Nadvorna Rebbe of Bloomingburg, NY
        - Grand Rabbi Burech Rosenbaum of Nanash-Williamsburg, son of Rabbi Meir Rosenbaum of Caracas
      - Grand Rabbi Israel Rosenbaum of Stanislaw-Monsey (Shavuos 1931 - November 8, 2009), son of Rabbi Isaac of Zutshka and son-in-law of Rabbi Menachem Shlomo Taub (1901‑1978), Kaliver Rebbe and author of Chakal Tapuchin
    - Rabbi Meir Rosenbaum, Chief Rabbi of Cuba and Mexico, son of Rabbi Isamar of Nadvorna
    - Grand Rabbi Asher Yeshaya Rosenbaum of Nadvorna-Hadera, son of Rabbi Issamar of Nadvorna, son-in-law of his brother Rabbi Isaac Rosenbaum of Zutshka
      - Grand Rabbi Berel Rosenbaum of Linsk-Williamsburg, son of Rabbi Asher Yeshaya Rosenbaum of Nadvorna-Hadera
  - Grand Rabbi Eliezer Zev of Kretshnif (murdered at Auschwitz, 1944) author of Raza Dshabbos, son of Rabbi Meir of Kretshnif
    - Grand Rabbi Nissan Chaim Rosenbaum of Bradshin, son of Rabbi Eliezer Zev of Kretshnif
      - Grand Rabbi Tzvi Hirsch Rosenbaum of Kretshnif-Sighet (1920–2006) in Jerusalem, son of Rabbi Nissan Chaim of Bradshin, son-in-law of Rabbi Chaim Mordechai Rosenbaum of Nadvorna
        - Grand Rabbi Nissan Chaim Rosenbaum of Kretshnif-Israel, son of Rabbi Tzvi Hirsch Rosenbaum of Kretshnif-Sighet in Jerusalem,
        - Grand Rabbi Zeidel Rosenbaum of Kretshnif-New York, son of Rabbi Tzvi Hirsch Rosenbaum of Kretshnif-Sighet,
    - Grand Rabbi Shmuel Shmelke Rosenbaum of Bitschkov, son of Rabbi Eliezer Zev of Kretshnif, son-in-law of Rabbi Pinchas Shapiro of Kechneya
    - Grand Rabbi Mordechai Rosenbaum of Pest, son of Rabbi Eliezer Zev of Kretshnif, son-in-law of Rabbi Yaakov Leifer of Nadvorna-Debrecen
    - Grand Rabbi Meir Rosenbaum of Nadvorna-Satmar, son of Rabbi Eliezer Zev of Kretshnif, son in law of Rabbi Yissachar Dov Ber (Bertche) Leifer of Nadvorna-Satmar
    - Grand Rabbi David Moshe Rosenbaum of Kretshnif (died 1969), son of Rabbi Eliezer Zev, son-in-law of Rabbi Chaim Mordechai of Nadvorna
      - Grand Rabbi Menachem Elazar Zev Rosenbaum of Kretshnif-Rechovot, present Rebbe of Kretshnif-Rechovot, son of Rabbi David Moshe
      - Grand Rabbi Yisroel Nisan Rosenbaum of Kretshnif, present Rebbe of Kretshnif-Kiryat Gat, son of Rabbi David Moshe
      - Grand Rabbi Zeyda Shmuel Shmelke Rosenbaum of Bitschkov in Jaffa, son of Rabbi David Moshe
      - Grand Rabbi Meir Rosenbaum of Premishlan, present Premishlaner Rebbe, son of Rabbi David Moshe of Kretshnif
      - Grand Rabbi Yosef Shlomo Rosenbaum of Kretshnif-Monsey, son of Rabbi David Moshe of Kretshnif and son-in-law of Rabbi Israel Rosenbaum of Stanislaw
  - Grand Rabbi Mordechai Rosenbaum of Rachov (murdered at Auschwitz, 25 May 1944), son of Rabbi Meir Rosenbaum of Kretshnif
  - Grand Rabbi Yitzchak Rosenbaum of Rachov (murdered at Auschwitz, 25 May 1944) son of Rabbi Meir Rosenbaum of Kretshnif
    - Grand Rabbi Meir of Drubitch, son of Rabbi Yitzchak Rosenbaum of Rachov
    - Grand Rabbi Elazar Zev Rosenbaum of Rachov, son of Rabbi Yitzchak Rosenbaum of Rachov, son in law of Rabbi Chaim Mordechai Rosenbaum of 'Nadvorna'
  - Grand Rabbi Pinchas Shapiro of Kechneya (murdered at Auschwitz, 25 May 1944) author of Tzofnas Paneach, son-in-law of Rabbi Meir Rosenbaum of Kretshnif
    - Grand Rabbi Sholom Yesochor Dov Shapiro (1900-1957), Kechina Rebbe of Novisalitz, Romania, son of Rabbi Pinchas Shapiro of Kechneya, and son-in-law of Rabbi Issamar Rosenbaum of 'Nadvorna'
      - Rabbi Esriel Rubin of Dombrova scion of the Ropshitz Hasidic dynasty, son-in-law of Grand Rabbi Yisachar Ber Shapiro of Kechneya
        - Grand Rabbi Naftoli Tzvi Rubin of Dombrova, son of Rabbi Esriel Rubin and son-in law of Rabbi Meir Rosenbaum of Caracas
    - Grand Rabbi Isaac Taub of Kalov, son in law of Rabbi Pinchas Shapiro of Kechneya

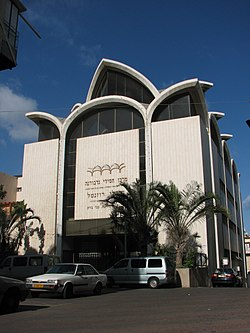
The building of the Nadvorna Hassidic institutions, located in the center of Kiryat Nadvorna.

== Kiryat Nadvorna ==
Kiryat Nadvorna is a neighborhood in southeastern Bnei Brak that serves as the world center of the Nadvorna Chassidus and the quarters of some of its Hasidim.

=== The Nadvorna Chassidic Center ===
The Nadvorna Chassidic Center is the official name of the Beit Midrash and the central synagogue and the institutions of Nadvorna Chassidut in Kiryat Nadvorna in Bnei Brak. One of the largest synagogues in Bnei Brak.

The Beit Midrash is visible from many places in the city. The Rebbe's house was built next to the Beit Midrash building. The synagogue is located between the Admor of Nadvorna, Chiddushei HaRim and Chazon Ish streets.

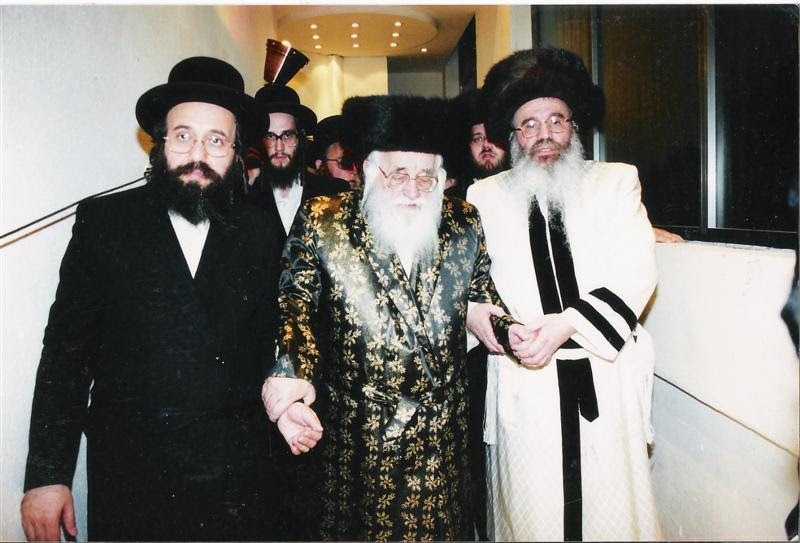
Rabbi Nathan David Rosenbaum, Rebbe of Zutschka

== Zutschka ==
Zutshka is a Hasidic court from the house of Nadvorna. The first Rebbe was Rabbi Yitzchak Isaac Rosenbaum.

=== Rabbi Yitzchak Isaac Rosenbaum ===
Rabbi Yitzchak Isaac Rosenbaum (18 January 1896 - July 20, 2000) was the Admor of Zutshka.

=== Rabbi Natan David Rosenbaum ===
Rabbi Natan David Rosenbaum (May 15, 1945 - February 2, 2019). He was the Admor of Zutshka.

== Other descendants ==
Descendants of Mordechai of Nadvorna who are not rebbes include:

- MK Rabbi Shmuel Halpert, of the Knesset in the State of Israel, who is a Grandson of Rebbe Shmuel Shmelka of Chust
- Yosef Reinman, a rabbinical scholar and author, a grandson (by marriage) of Rebbe Meir of Kretshnif.
- Rabbi Issamar Ginzberg, Nadvorna-Kechnia Rebbe
