= Kretshnif (Hasidic dynasty) =

Romanian Hasidic dynasty

Kretshnif Hasidic Dynasty
Founder
- Rabbi Meir Rosenbaum

Regions with significant populations
- Israel, United States, England, Canada

Religions
- Hasidic Judaism

Related ethnic groups
- Nadvorna

Kretshnif (Yiddish: קרעטשניף; also transliterated Kretshniv, Kretchinev, Kretchniv, or Kretshniff) is a dynasty in Hasidic Judaism that comes from the Nadvorna dynasty, named for Crăciunești in present-day Romania. The founding rebbe (hereditary rabbinical dynastic leader) was Meir Rosenbaum, a son of Mordechai, rebbe of Nadvorna. His sons and successors included Eliezer Zev in Kretshnif and Sighit, and Issamar of Nadvorna (d. 1973) in Chernowitz. The descendant rabbis of this dynasty are mainly in Israel, New York City, England, and Canada.

== Dynasty ==
- Grand Rabbi Meir Rosenbaum of Nadvorna-Kretshniff (d. 1908), son of Rabbi Mordechai Leifer (changed last name to Rosenbaum), son-in-law of Rabbi Yechiel Michel Tirer of Dorohoi
  - Grand Rabbi Eliezer Zev Rosenbaum of Kretshniff (d. 1944) author of Raza d'Shabbos, son of Rabbi Meir of Kretshniff
    - Grand Rabbi Nissan Chaim Rosenbaum, of Bradshin, son of Rabbi Eliezer Zev of Kretshniff
      - Grand Rabbi Tzvi Hirsch Rosenbaum of Kretshniff-Sighet (1920-2006) in Jerusalem, son of Rabbi Nissan Chaim of Bradshin, son in law of Rabbi Chaim Mordechai Rosenbaum of Nadvorna
        - Grand Rabbi Nissan Chaim Rosenbaum of Kretshniff-Jerusalem, son of Rabbi Tzvi Hirsch Rosenbaum of Kretchnif-Sighit in Jerusalem,
        - Grand Rabbi Zeidel Rosenbaum of Kretshniff-New York (1950-2025), son of Rabbi Tzvi Hirsch Rosenbaum of Kretchnif-Sighit in Jerusalem
          - Grand Rabbi mordechai Rosenbaum of Kretshniff kfar atta
    - Grand Rabbi David Moshe Rosenbaum of Kretshniff (d. 1969), son of Rabbi Eliezer Zev, son-in-law of Rabbi Chaim Mordechai of Nadvorna (Rehovot since 1950s)
      - Grand Rabbi Menachem Eliezer Zev Rosenbaum of Kretshnif-Rechovos, present Rebbe of Kretshnif-Rechovos (Rehovot), son of Rabbi David Moshe
      - Grand Rabbi Yisroel Nisan Rosenbaum of Kretshniff, present Rebbe of Kretshnif-Kiryath Gath, son of Rabbi David Moshe
      - Grand Rabbi Meir Rosenbaum of Premishlan, present Premishlaner Rebbe, son of Rabbi David Moshe
      - Grand Rabbi Zeyda Shmuel Shmelke Rosenbaum of Bitschkov in Yaffo, son of Rabbi David Moshe who passed and current Admor is Rabbi David
      - Grand Rabbi Yosef Shlomo Rosenbaum of Kretshnif-Monsey, son of Rabbi David Moshe of Kretshnif and son-in-law of Rabbi Israel Rosenbaum of Stanislov
    - Grand Rabbi Shmuel Shmelke Rosenbaum of Bitschkov, son of Rabbi Eliezer Zev of Kretshniff, son in law of Rabbi Pinchas Shapiro of Kechneya
    - Grand Rabbi Mordechai Rosenbaum of Pest son of Rabbi Eliezer Zev of Kretshniff, son in law of Rabbi Yaakov Leifer of Nadvorna-Debrecen
    - Grand Rabbi Meir Rosenbaum of Nadvorna-Satmar, son of Rabbi Eliezer Zev of Kretshniff, son in law of Rabbi Yisachar Bertchi Leifer of Nadvorna-Satmar
  - Grand Rabbi Mordechai Rosenbaum of Rachov, son of Rabbi Meir Rosenbaum of Kretshniff
  - Grand Rabbi Yitzchak Rosenbaum of Rachov son of Rabbi Meir Rosenbaum of Kretshniff
    - Grand Rabbi Mayer of Drubitch, son of Rabbi Yitzchak Rosenbaum of Rachov
    - Grand Rabbi Eliezer Zev Rosenbaum of Rachov, son of Rabbi Yitzchak Rosenbaum of Rachov, son in law of Rabbi Chaim Mordechai Rosenbaum of 'Nadvorna'
  - Grand Rabbi Pinchas Shapiro of Kechneya author of Tzofnas Paane'iach, son-in-law of Rabbi Meir of Kretshniff
    - Grand Rabbi Yisachar Ber Shapiro of Kechneya, son of Rabbi Pinchas Shapiro of Kechneya, son in law of Rabbi Issamar Rosenbaum of 'Nadvorna'
      - Rabbi Esriel Rubin of Dombrova scion of the Ropshitz Chassidic Dynasty, son in law of Grand Rabbi Yisachar Ber Shapiro of Kechneya
        - Grand Rabbi Naftoli Tzvi Rubin of Dombrova son of Rabbi Esriel Rubin and son-in law of Rabbi Meir Rosenbaum of Caracas
    - Grand Rabbi Isaac Taub of Kalov, son in law of Rabbi Pinchas Shapiro of Kechneya
  - Grand Rabbi Shlomo Isaacson, Romaner Rebbe, son in law of Rabbi Meir of Kretshniff
    - Grand Rabbi Yisachar Ber Isaacson of Polyina, son of Rabbi Shlomo Isaacson the Romaner Rebbe, and son in law of Rabbi Yisroel Chaim Friedman of Rachov
      - Grand Rabbi Yechiel Yehuda Isaacson of Achuza, son of Rabbi Yisachar Ber Isaacson of Polyina, son in law of Rabbi Chaim Tzvi Teitelbaum of Sighet
    - Grand Rabbi Yisroel (Isaacson) Leifer of Nirdhas, son of Rabbi Shlomo Isaacson, Romaner Rebbe, son in law of Rabbi Yoseph Leifer of Nirdhas
    - Grand Rabbi Meyer Isaacson, son of Rabbi Shlomo, Romaner Rebbe, son in law of Rabbi Issamar of Nadvorna
      - Grand Rabbi Chaim Shulem Isaacson, Son of Rabbi Meyer of Roman, of Philadelphia
      - Grand Rabbi Shlomo Isaacson of Passaic, son of Rabbi Meyer of Roman
      - Grand Rabbi Berel Isaacson of Staten Island, son of Rabbi Meyer of Roman
  - Grand Rabbi Yaakov Yisachar Ber Rosenbaum of Slotvina-Sighet, son of Rabbi Meir Rosenbaum of Nadvorna-Kretshniff, son in law of Rabbi Aaron Moshe Leifer of Zalon-Lantzut
    - Grand Rabbi Chaim Mordechai of Mishkoltz, son of Rabbi Yaakov Yisachar Ber Rosenbaum of Slotvina-Sighet
    - Grand Rabbi Meir of Reisha, son of Rabbi Yaakov Yisachar Ber Rosenbaum of Slotvina-Sighet
    - Grand Rabbi Yitzchak of Sighet, author of Minchas Yitzchak, and Bishilei Hapri, son of Rabbi Yaakov Yisachar Ber Rosenbaum of Slotvina-Sighet, son in law of Rabbi Yaakov Leifer of Nadvorna-Debrecen
  - Grand Rabbi Issamar Rosenbaum of Nadvorna, known as "Ha’admor Hazaken MiNadvorna" (1886-1973), son of Rabbi Meir of Kretshniff, son-in-law of Grand Rabbi Isaiah Rubin of Kolbosov
    - Grand Rabbi Chaim Mordechai Rosenbaum of Nadvorna (1904-1977), son of Rabbi Issamar of Chernovitz-Nadvorna, son in law of Rabbi Eliezer Zev of Kretshniff
      - Grand Rabbi Yaakov Yisachar Ber Rosenbaum of Nadvorna-Bnei Brak, present Nadvorna Rebbe of Bnei Brak, son of Rabbi Chaim Mordechai
    - Grand Rabbi Yisachar Ber Rosenbaum of Stroznhitz, author of Divrei Yisachar (d. 1980), son of Rabbi Issamar Rosenbaum of Nadvorna, son-in-law of Rabbi Yisachar Bertchi Leifer of Nadvorna-Satmar
      - Grand Rabbi Usher Mordechai Rosenbaum of Cleveland-Stroznitz (died 1991) author of Sifsei Reim, son of Rabbi Yisachar Ber, and son in law of Rabbi Meir Leifer of Cleveland
        - Grand Rabbi Meir Yoseph Rosenbaum of Stroznitz, son of Rabbi Usher Mordechai Rosenbaum of Cleveland-Stroznitz
        - Grand Rabbi Yehoshua Heschel Rosenbaum of Cleveland present Clevelander Rebbe of Williamsburg, son of Rabbi Usher Mordechai Rosenbaum of Cleveland-Stroznitz
        - Grand Rabbi Yitzchak Isaac Rosenbaum of Stroznitz in London, son of Rabbi Asher Mordechai
        - Grand Rabbi Alter Zev Rosenbaum of Nadvorna-Williamsburg, son of Rabbi Usher Mordechai Rosenbaum of Cleveland-Stroznitz
      - Grand Rabbi Meir Rosenbaum of Mosholu, son of Rabbi Yisachar Ber of Stroznitz
        - Grand Rabbi Duvid Rosenbaum of Kolbosov, from Williamsburg, Brooklyn, son of Rabbi Meir of Mosholu
        - Grand Rabbi Usher Mordechai Rosenbaum of Mosholu, present Mosholu Rebbe of Boro Park, son of Rabbi Meir
      - Grand Rabbi Isaac Rosenbaum of Cleveland Rannana, present Clevelander Rebbe of Raanana, son of Rabbi Yisachar Ber of Stroznitz
      - Grand Rabbi Yoseph Rosenbaum of Kalish-Flatbush, son of Rabbi Yisachar Ber of Stroznitz (d. 2019)
        - Grand Rabbi Yechiel Michel Rosenbaum of Kalish, present Kalisher Rebbe of Flatbush, son of Rabbi Yoseph
        - Grand Rabbi Yitzchok Rosenbaum of Stanislav-Monsey
    - Grand Rabbi Isaac Eisik Rosenbaum (1906-2000) of Zutshka, son of Rabbi Issamar of Nadvorna
      - Grand Rabbi Nathan David Rosenbaum of Zutshka, present Zutshka Rebbe, son of Rabbi Isaac
      - Grand Rabbi Meir Rosenbaum of Caracas, son of Rabbi Isaac of Zutshka
        - Grand Rabbi Burech Rosenbaum of Nanash-Williamsburg, son of Rabbi Meir Rosenbaum of Caracas
        - Rabbi Yaakov Rosenbaum, son of Rabbi Meir. Resident shochet in Kiryas Tosh
          - Grand Rabbi Zeide Yisrael Chaim Yoel Rosenbaum, son of Rabbi Yaakov. Nadvorna Rebbe of Bloomingburg, NY
      - Grand Rabbi Israel Rosenbaum of Stanislov, son of Rabbi Isaac of Zutshka
    - Grand Rabbi Asher Yeshayah Rosenbaum of Nadvorna-Hadera, son of Rabbi Issamar of Nadvorna, son in law of his brother Rabbi Isaac Rosenbaum of Zutshka
      - Grand Rabbi Berel Rosenbaum of Linsk-Williamsburg, son of Rabbi Asher Yeshayah Rosenbaum of Nadvorna-Hadera
    - Rabbi Meyer Rosenbaum, Chief Rabbi of Cuba, son of Rabbi Issamar of Nadvorna

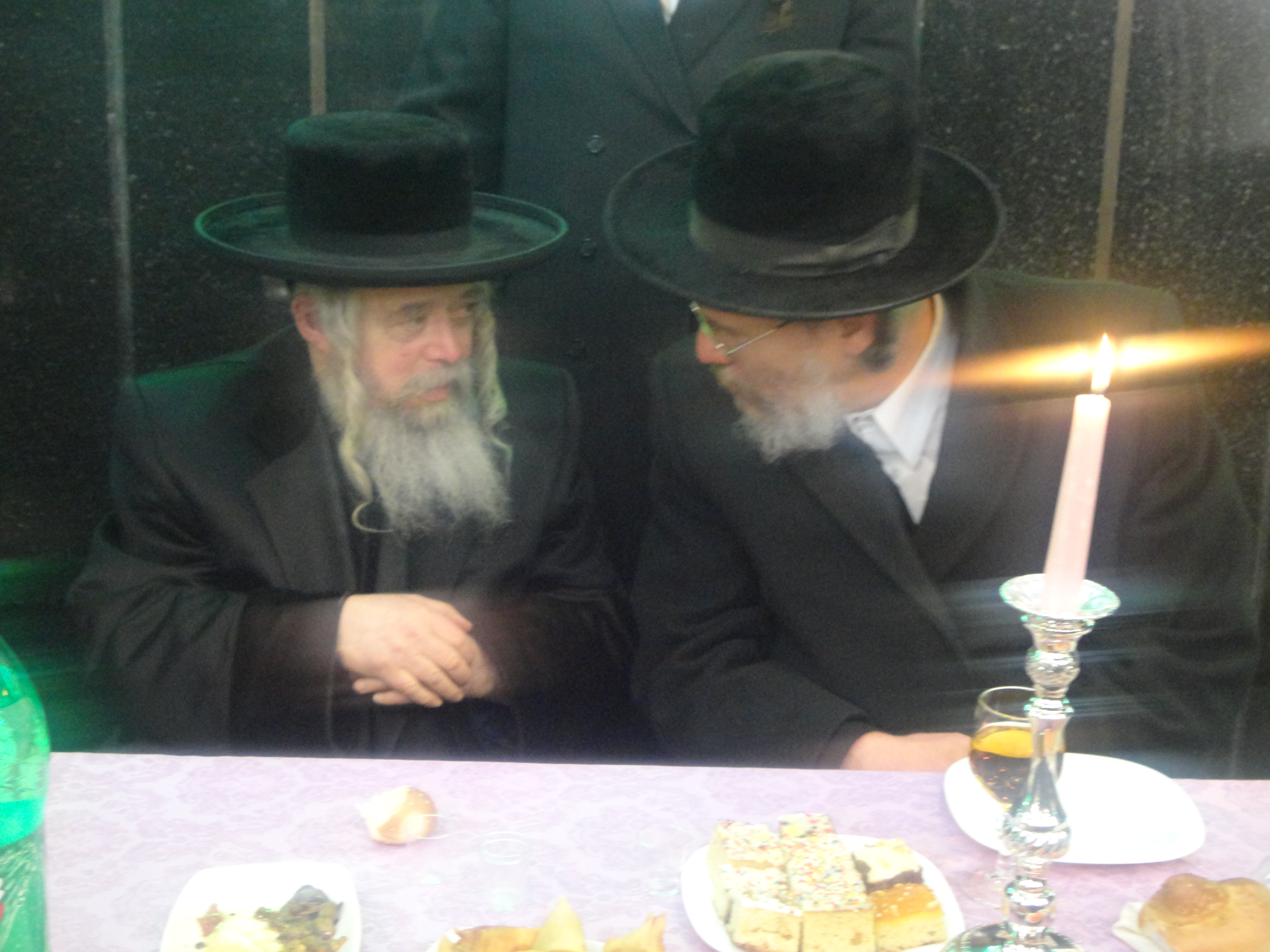
Rav Zeidel of Kretchnif-Siget with the Rebbe of Sochatchov

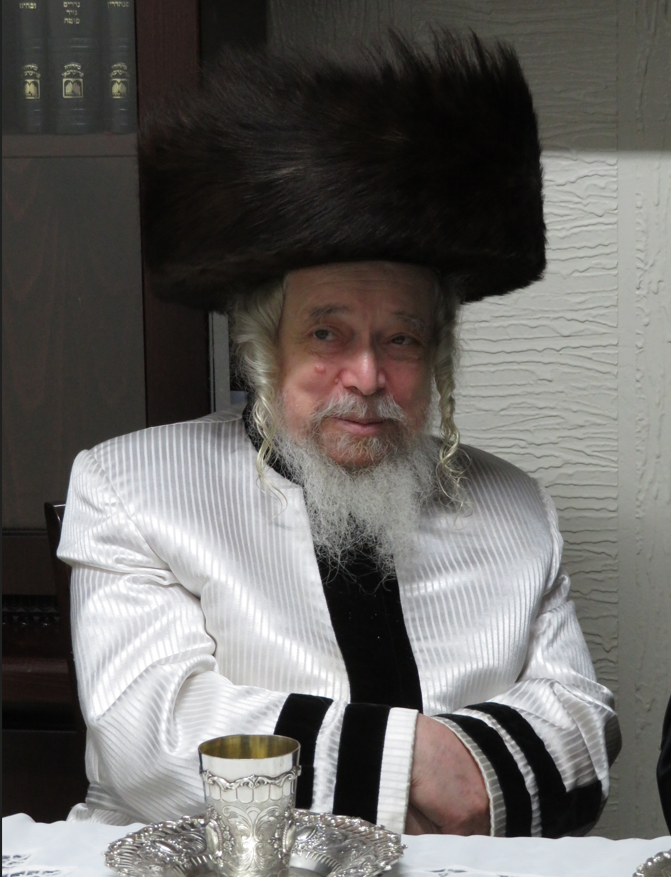
Rav Zeidel of Kretschnif-Sighet

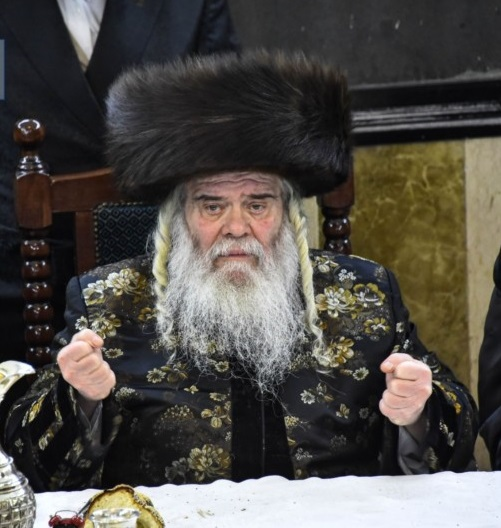
Rav Nissan Rosenbaum, the Rebbe of Kretshnif-Yerushalayim

    - Kretchnif Siget–Kfar Ata Rebbe
