= Meyer Rosenbaum (II) =

Cuban rabbi

Religious life
- Religion: Judaism

Meyer Rosenbaum (1910-2003) was the spiritual leader of the Kehilla Adath Israel and the self-proclaimed Chief Rabbi of Cuba from 1948 to 1958, when he left for Venezuela, then Guatemala, and New York.

== Biography ==
Rosenbaum was born on 12 August 1910 in Chernivtsi, Ukraine (previously Czernowitz, Austria-Hungary), as a son of Rebbe Isamar Rosenbaum. Rosenbaum left in 1933 for Eretz Israel, where he learned in Hebron Yeshiva (Jerusalem). He received his rabbinic ordination in 1936, making him Isamar's only son who did not become a Hasidic rabbi. In 1937, he moved to New York and in 1948 Rosenbaum arrived in Cuba on a charity collection mission for the Israeli Irgun. He soon became the Rabbi of Adath Israel-K’neseth Israel, then later rabbi of the Patronato.

Rosenbaum also was accomplished in the secular world. He attended the University of Vienna and New York University. In Cuba, he taught at the Universidad de la Habana.

When Rosenbaum was still associated with Kehilla Ahdut Israel (the combined Adath Israel and Kneseth Israel), he founded the orthodox Tahkemoni School on 20 October 1949. Tajkemoni was an Orthodox yeshiva-type school with an enrollment of about 80 Ashkenazi pupils. It constituted a threat to the Centro Israelita and its Colegio, and it was probably responsible for some of the decline in enrollment at the Colegio. The principal was Yosef Abrami, who was present at the founding meeting of the Patronato. Abrami previously had taught in the Centro Israelita. He also authored many scholarly works in Hebrew, Yiddish, and Spanish.

== See also ==
- History of the Jews in Cuba
- List of Latin American Jews
- List of Cubans
- Nadvorna
- Ashkenazi Jews
- Hasidic Judaism
- Chief Rabbi
